= 2024 KBS Drama Awards =

38th edition of award ceremony

- Official logo
- Date: Ceremony: December 31, 2024 Broadcast: January 11, 2025
- Site: KBS Hall, Yeouido, Seoul
- Hosted by: Jang Sung-kyu; Seohyun; Moon Sang-min
- Official website: KBS Drama Awards

Highlights
- Grand Prize (Daesang): Lee Soon-jae
- Most awards: 9 – Iron Family
- Most nominations: 21 – Iron Family

Television coverage
- Network: KBS2 (delay)
- Viewership: Ratings: 3.2%; Viewership: 641,000

The 2024 KBS Drama Awards, presented by Korean Broadcasting System (KBS), was held on December 31, 2024, from 19:50 (KST) at KBS Hall in Yeouido, Seoul. Jang Sung-kyu in his second consecutive year with Seohyun, a South Korean singer, actress, and songwriter and Moon Sang-min, a South Korean actor and model hosted the award show.

Due to the tragic crash of Jeju Air Flight 2216 on December 29, 2024, KBS2 decided to delay the live broadcast of the 2024 KBS Drama Awards on December 31. A special live broadcast to welcome the New Year that was to follow the awards ceremony was also cancelled.

Instead, the event was broadcast on January 11, 2025 at 21:20 (KST). The winners were announced on the same day. Lee Soon-jae won the Grand prize (Daesang) for Dog Knows Everything. At the age of 90, he is the oldest grand prize winner among the drama awards.

== Winners and nominees ==
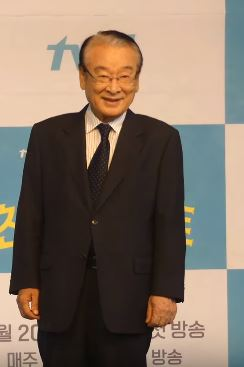
Lee Soon-jae

Winners of Grand Prize (Daesang)

Nominees for grand prize were announced on December 26, 2024.

Winners are listed first and denoted in bold.

Grand Prize (Daesang)
**Lee Soon-jae – Dog Knows Everything**; Park Ji-young – Iron Family; Kim Ha-neul – Nothing Uncovered; Ji Hyun-woo – Beauty and Mr. Romantic; Im Soo-hyang – Beauty and Mr. Romantic; Kim Jung-hyun – Iron Family
Top Excellence Award, Actor	Top Excellence Award, Actress
**Ji Hyun-woo – Beauty and Mr. Romantic**; **Kim Jung-hyun – Iron Family**; Baek Sung-hyun – Suji & Uri; Yeon Woo-jin – Nothing Uncovered; Lee Soon-jae – Dog Knows Everything	**Park Ji-young – Iron Family**; **Im Soo-hyang – Beauty and Mr. Romantic**; Kim Ha-neul – Nothing Uncovered; Park Ha-na – My Merry Marriage; Cha Hwa-yeon – Beauty and Mr. Romantic
Excellence Award, Actor in a Miniseries	Excellence Award, Actress in a Miniseries
**Park Ji-hoon – Love Song for Illusion**; Kim Myung-soo – Dare to Love Me; Kim Byung-chul – Perfect Family; Yeon Woo-jin – Nothing Uncovered; Lee Min-ki – Face Me; Lee Soon-jae – Dog Knows Everything; Jang Seung-jo – Nothing Uncovered	**Han Ji-hyun – Face Me**; **Yeonwoo – Dog Knows Everything**; Kim Ha-neul – Nothing Uncovered; Yoon Se-ah – Perfect Family; Lee Yoo-young – Dare to Love Me; Hong Ye-ji – Love Song for Illusion
Excellence Award, Actor in a Serial Drama	Excellence Award, Actress in a Serial Drama
**Shin Hyun-joon – Iron Family**; Kim Jung-hyun – Iron Family; Park Sang-won – Beauty and Mr. Romantic; Park In-hwan – Iron Family; Ji Hyun-woo – Beauty and Mr. Romantic	**Keum Sae-rok – Iron Family**; Kim Young-ok – Iron Family; Park Ji-young – Iron Family; Im Soo-hyang – Beauty and Mr. Romantic; Cha Hwa-yeon – Beauty and Mr. Romantic
Excellence Award, Actor in a Daily Drama	Excellence Award, Actress in a Daily Drama
**Baek Sung-hyun – Suji & Uri**; **Oh Chang-seok – The Two Sisters**; Kim Sa-kwon – My Merry Marriage; Jin Ju-hyung – Snow White's Revenge; Choi Woong – Snow White's Revenge; Choi Jae-sung – My Merry Marriage	**Park Ha-na – My Merry Marriage**; **Hahm Eun-jung – Suji & Uri**; Yang Mi-kyung – My Merry Marriage; Oh Hyun-kyung – Suji & Uri; Lee So-yeon – The Two Sisters; Han Bo-reum – Snow White's Revenge; Han Chae-young – Snow White's Revenge
Best Actor in Drama Special/TV Cinema	Best Actress in Drama Special/TV Cinema
**Nam Da-reum – "The History of Us"**; Kim Kang-min – "The Soles Are Hot"; Oh Seung-hoon – "Finding Handsome"; Tang Jun-sang – "The History of Us"; Jung Gun-joo – "The Road in Between"; Ha Jun – "The Two Women"	**Oh Ye-ju – "To My Lonely Sister"**; Choi Ri – "The Two Women"; Choi Hee-jin – "The Road in Between"; Kang Mi-na – "The Two Women"
Best Supporting Actor	Best Supporting Actress
**Kim Yong-gun – Dog Knows Everything**; **Choi Tae-joon – Iron Family**; Yoon Je-moon – Nothing Uncovered; Go Yoon – Beauty and Mr. Romantic; Yoon Da-hoon – Suji & Uri	**Yoon Yoo-sun – Beauty and Mr. Romantic**; Kim Hye-eun – Iron Family; Han Chae-ah – Nothing Uncovered; Ye Soo-jung – Dog Knows Everything; Kang Byul – Suji & Uri; Hwang Seok-jeong – Love Song for Illusion
Best New Actor	Best New Actress
**Park Sang-nam – My Merry Marriage**; **Seo Bum-june – Nothing Uncovered**; Kim Jong-hun – Suji & Uri; Kim Jin-woo – Snow White's Revenge; Kim Hyun-joon – Iron Family; Yang Dae-hyuk – Beauty and Mr. Romantic; Lee Sang-jun – Beauty and Mr. Romantic	**Hong Ye-ji – Love Song for Illusion**; **Han Soo-a – Beauty and Mr. Romantic**←; Song Ye-bin – Suji & Uri; Oh Young-joo – Snow White's Revenge; Yang Hye-ji – Iron Family; Ji Woo – Love Song for Illusion; Yoon Ga-i – Nothing Uncovered
Best Young Actor	Best Young Actress
**Moon Seong-hyun – Beauty and Mr. Romantic**; Kim Seo-ha – My Merry Marriage; Lee Si-on – Snow White's Revenge; Lee Joo-won – Love Song for Illusion; Han Soo-ho – Iron Family	**Lee Seol-ah – Beauty and Mr. Romantic**; Kang Hye-rin – My Merry Marriage; Kim Su-ha – Love Song for Illusion; Yoon Chae-na – Suji & Uri; Jung Seo-yeon – Iron Family; Jo Eun-sol – Snow White's Revenge
Popularity Award, Actor	Popularity Award, Actress
**Kim Myung-soo – Dare to Love Me**; Kim Byung-chul – Perfect Family; Kim Jung-hyun – Iron Family; Park Sang-nam – My Merry Marriage; Park Ji-hoon – Love Song for Illusion; Baek Sung-hyun – Suji & Uri; Yeon Woo-jin – Nothing Uncovered; Oh Chang-seok – The Two Sisters; Lee Min-ki – Face Me; Lee Soon-jae – Dog Knows Everything; Jang Seung-jo – Nothing Uncovered; Ji Hyun-woo – Beauty and Mr. Romantic; Jin Ju-hyung – Snow White's Revenge; Choi Woong – Snow White's Revenge	**Keum Sae-rok – Iron Family**; Kim Gyu-seon – Snow White's Revenge; Kim Ha-neul – Nothing Uncovered; Park Ju-hyun – Perfect Family; Park Ha-na – My Merry Marriage; Yeonwoo – Dog Knows Everything; Yoon Se-ah – Perfect Family; Lee So-yeon – The Two Sisters; Lee Yoo-young – Dare to Love Me; Im Soo-hyang – Beauty and Mr. Romantic; Han Bo-reum – Snow White's Revenge; Han Ji-hyun – Face Me; Han Chae-young – Snow White's Revenge; Hahm Eun-jung – Suji & Uri; Hong Ye-ji – Love Song for Illusion
Best Couple Award	Scriptwriter Award
**Ji Hyun-woo and Im Soo-hyang – Beauty and Mr. Romantic**; **Kim Jung-hyun and Keum Sae-rok – Iron Family**; **Baek Sung-hyun and Hahm Eun-jung – Suji & Uri**; **Park Ji-young, Shin Hyun-joon and Kim Hye-eun – Iron Family**; **Yeonwoo, Lee Soon-jae and Ari – Dog Knows Everything**	**Seo Sook-hyang – Iron Family**

== Presenters ==
Order	Presenter(s)	Award(s)	Ref.
1	Moon Woo-jin and Kim Si-eun	Best Young Actor/Actress	
2	Choo Young-woo and Seo Ji-hye	Best New Actor/Actress	
3	Lee Jae-won and Chae Won-bin	Best Actor/Actress in Drama Special	
4	Kim Young-jo (Note: Director of KBS Drama Center) and Oh Na-ra	Best Writer	
5	Kang Kyung-hun and Jo Han-chul	Best Supporting Actor/Actress	
6	Ahn Jae-wook and Uhm Ji-won	Excellence Award, Actor/Actress in a Daily Drama	
7	Lee Young-ae	Popularity Award	
8	Jang Sung-kyu	Best Couple Award	
9	Ha Jun and Ji Seung-hyun	Excellence Award, Actor/Actress in a Serial Drama	
10	Cho Yi-hyun and Seol In-ah	Excellence Award, Actor/Actress in a Miniseries	
11	Kim Dong-jun and Uee	Top Excellence Actor/Actress	
12	Choi Soo-jong and Park Jang-beom (Note: CEO of KBS)	Grand Prize (Daesang)	

== Performances ==
Artist	Act performed	Ref.
Kim Da-hyun	"A Happy Day" (Beauty and Mr. Romantic OST)	
Yook Joong-wan Band	"Everything in the World" (Iron Family OST)	

== See also ==
- 2024 MBC Drama Awards
- 2024 SBS Drama Awards
