= 2024 in South Korean television =

This is a non-comprehensive list of Television in South Korea related events from 2024.

== New series & returning shows ==
=== Drama ===
Title	Channel/Platform	First Aired	Last Aired	Status	Ref.
Marry My Husband	tvN	January 1	February 20	Ended	
Love Song for Illusion	KBS2	January 2	February 27	Ended	
Knight Flower	MBC TV	January 12	February 17	Ended	
A Shop for Killers	Disney+	January 17	February 7	Renewed	
The Bequeathed	Netflix	January 19		Ended	
LTNS	TVING	January 19	February 1	Ended	
Captivating the King	tvN	January 21	March 3	Ended	
The Two Sisters	KBS2	January 22	June 14	Ended	
Love for Love's Sake	Cinema Heaven	January 23	January 31	Ended	
Flex X Cop	SBS TV	January 26	March 23	Renewed	
Doctor Slump	JTBC	January 27	March 17	Ended	
Queen of Divorce	JTBC	January 31	March 7	Ended	
Branding in Seongsu	U+ Mobile TV	February 5	March 14	Ended	
Mina, You Changed Your Profile Picture Again	Watcha	February 7		Ended	
A Killer Paradox	Netflix	February 9		Ended	
Grand Shining Hotel	TVING/tvN	February 16		Ended	
Wedding Impossible	tvN	February 26	April 2	Ended	
The Impossible Heir	Disney+	February 28	April 3	Ended	
Pyramid Game	TVING	February 29	March 21	Ended	
Wonderful World	MBC TV	March 1	April 13	Ended	
Queen of Tears	tvN	March 9	April 28	Ended	
The Midnight Studio	Genie TV/ENA	March 11	May 6	Ended	
Chicken Nugget	Netflix	March 15		Ended	
The Destiny Changer	Watcha	March 15		Ended	
Nothing Uncovered	KBS2	March 18	May 7	Ended	
Beauty and Mr. Romantic	KBS2	March 23	September 22	Ended	
Hide	Coupang Play/JTBC	March 23	April 28	Ended	
Suji & Uri	KBS1	March 25	October 4	Ended	
Jazz for Two	Cinema Heaven	March 26	March 29	Ended	
The Escape of the Seven: Resurrection	SBS TV	March 29	May 18	Ended	
Love Is Like a Cat	Heavenly	April 1	May 6	Ended	
Parasyte: The Grey	Netflix	April 5		Ended	
Lovely Runner	tvN	April 8	May 28	Ended	
Reunion Counseling	KBS N	April 9	May 28	Ended	
Blood Free	Disney+	April 10	May 8	Ended	
Gray Shelter	Heavenly	April 11	April 25	Ended	
Under the Gun	Lifetime	April 12	April 26	Ended	
Missing Crown Prince	MBN	April 13	June 16	Ended	
Chief Detective 1958	MBC TV	April 19	May 18	Ended	
Boys Be Brave	Heavenly	April 25	May 16	Ended	
The Chairman Is Level 9	Wavve	April 29	June 3	Ended	
Goodbye Earth	Netflix	April 26		Ended	
Begins ≠ Youth	Xclusive	April 30	May 14	Ended	
Frankly Speaking	JTBC	May 1	June 6	Ended	
The Atypical Family	JTBC	May 4	June 9	Ended	
The Brave Yong Su-jeong	MBC TV	May 6	November 15	Ended	
The Midnight Romance in Hagwon	tvN	May 11	June 30	Ended	
Crash	ENA	May 13	June 18	Renewed	
Dare to Love Me	KBS2	May 13	July 2	Ended	
Uncle Samsik	Disney+	May 15	June 19	Ended	
Blossom Campus	Heavenly	May 16		Ended	
The 8 Show	Netflix	May 17		Ended	
Bitter Sweet Hell	MBC TV	May 24	June 29	Ended	
Connection	SBS TV	May 24	July 6	Ended	
High School Return of a Gangster	Lifetime	May 29	June 19	Ended	
Dreaming of a Freaking Fairy Tale	TVING	May 31	June 28	Ended	
The Player 2: Master of Swindlers	tvN	June 3	July 9	Ended	
My Military Valentine	Viki	June 6	July 12	Ended	
Hierarchy	Netflix	June 7		Ended	
My Sweet Mobster	JTBC	June 12	August 1	Ended	
Miss Night and Day	JTBC	June 15	August 4	Ended	
Snow White's Revenge	KBS2	June 17	November 29	Ended	
The Whirlwind	Netflix	June 28		Ended	
Red Swan	Disney+	July 3	July 31	Ended	
The Pork Cutlets	MBC TV	July 5	July 6	Ended	
The Auditors	tvN	July 6	August 11	Ended	
Good Partner	SBS TV	July 12	September 20	Renewed	
Tarot	U+ Mobile TV	July 15	August 5	Ended	
O'PENing 2024	tvN, OCN (Note: Only last act.)	July 15	October 20	Ended	
Sweet Home 3	Netflix	July 19		Ended	
Serendipity's Embrace	tvN	July 22	August 13	Ended	
No Way Out: The Roulette	U+ Mobile TV	July 31	August 21	Ended	
Bad Memory Eraser	MBN	August 2	September 21	Ended	
Love Andante	Lifetime	August 7	August 29	Ended	
Romance in the House	JTBC	August 10	September 15	Ended	
Your Honor	Genie TV/ENA	August 12	September 10	Ended	
The Tyrant	Disney+	August 14		Ended	
Perfect Family	KBS2	August 14	September 19	Ended	
Black Out	MBC TV	August 16	October 4	Ended	
DNA Lover	TV Chosun	August 17	October 6	Ended	
Love Next Door	tvN	August 17	October 6	Ended	
Pachinko 2	Apple TV+	August 23	October 11	Ended	
The Frog	Netflix	August 23		Ended	
Cinderella at 2 AM	Coupang Play/Channel A	August 24	September 22	Ended	
No Gain No Love	tvN/TVING	August 26	October 1	Ended	
Queen Woo	TVING	August 29	September 12	Ended	
Fragile	U+ Mobile TV	September 9	October 28	Ended	
Seoul Busters	Disney+	September 11	October 30	Ended	
The Time of Fever	Heavenly	September 12		Ended	
The Judge from Hell	SBS TV	September 21	November 2	Ended	
Dear Hyeri	Genie TV/ENA	September 23	October 29	Ended	
Dog Knows Everything	KBS2	September 25	October 31	Ended	
Gyeongseong Creature 2	Netflix	September 27		Ended	
What Comes After Love	Coupang Play	September 27	October 25	Ended	
Iron Family	KBS2	September 28	January 26, 2025	Ended	
Spice Up Our Love	TVING	October 3		Ended	
My Merry Marriage	KBS1	October 7	April 8, 2025	Ended	
Family by Choice	JTBC	October 9	November 27	Ended	
Eccentric Romance	Heavenly	October 10	November 14	Ended	
Dongjae, the Good or the Bastard	TVING/tvN	October 10	November 7	Ended	
Doubt	MBC TV	October 11	November 15	Ended	
Jeongnyeon: The Star Is Born	tvN	October 12	November 17	Ended	
A Virtuous Business	JTBC	October 12	November 17	Ended	
Let Free the Curse of Taekwondo	Heavenly	October 17	November 7	Ended	
Love in the Big City	TVING	October 21		Ended	
Hellbound 2	Netflix	October 25		Ended	
Brewing Love	ENA/Genie TV	November 4	December 10	Ended	
KBS Drama Special 2024	KBS2	November 5	December 10	Ended	
Face Me	KBS2	November 6	December 12	Ended	
Gangnam B-Side	Disney+	November 6	November 27	Ended	
Mr. Plankton	Netflix	November 8		Ended	
The Fiery Priest 2	SBS TV	November 8	December 27	Ended	
Social Savvy Class 101	Cinema Heaven	November 10	November 17	Ended	
Marry You	Channel A	November 16	December 15	Ended	
Desperate Mrs. Seonju	MBC TV	November 18	June 2, 2025	Ended	
Parole Examiner Lee	tvN	November 18	December 24	Ended	
When the Phone Rings	MBC TV	November 22	January 4, 2025	Ended	
Love Your Enemy	tvN	November 23	December 29	Ended	
The Trunk	Netflix	November 29		Ended	
Family Matters	Coupang Play	November 29	December 27	Renewed	
The Tale of Lady Ok	JTBC	November 30	January 26, 2025	Ended	
Cinderella Game	KBS2	December 2	April 25, 2025	Ended	
Light Shop	Disney+	December 4	December 18	Ended	
Sorry Not Sorry	KBS Joy	December 5	February 27, 2025	Ended	
Who Is She	KBS2	December 18	January 23, 2025	Ended	
Check-in Hanyang	Channel A	December 21	February 9, 2025	Ended	
Namib	Genie TV/ENA	December 23	January 28, 2025	Ended	
Squid Game 2	Netflix	December 26		Ended	

=== Animation ===
Title	Network	First Aired	Last Aired	Status	Ref.
The Haunted House: Ghost Ball ZERO Part 2	Tooniverse	November 30, 2023	March 14, 2024	Ended	

== Ending ==
End date	Title	Channel/Platform	First Aired	Ref.
January 5	Death's Game	TVING	December 15, 2023	
January 6	The Story of Park's Marriage Contract	MBC TV	November 24, 2023	
January 10	A Good Day to Be a Dog	MBC TV	October 11, 2023	
January 14	Maestra: Strings of Truth	tvN	December 9, 2023	
January 16	Tell Me That You Love Me	ENA	November 27, 2023	
January 19	The Elegant Empire	KBS2	August 7, 2023	
January 20	My Man Is Cupid	Amazon Prime Video	December 1, 2023	
January 20	My Demon	SBS TV	November 24, 2023	
January 21	Welcome to Samdal-ri	JTBC	December 2, 2023	
January 31	Like Flowers in Sand	ENA	December 20, 2023	
February 25	My Happy Ending	TV Chosun	December 30, 2023	
March 10	Korea–Khitan War	KBS2	November 11, 2023	
March 15	Between Him and Her	Channel A	December 26, 2023	
March 17	Live Your Own Life	KBS2	September 16, 2023	
March 22	Unpredictable Family	KBS1	September 18, 2023	
May 3	The Third Marriage	MBC TV	October 23, 2023	

== Scheduled award ceremonies ==
2024 award ceremonies
Date	Event	Host(s)	Location(s)	Ref.
May 7	60th Baeksang Arts Awards	Shin Dong-yup; Bae Suzy; Park Bo-gum	COEX, Seoul	
July 19	3rd Blue Dragon Series Awards	Jun Hyun-moo; Im Yoon-ah	Paradise City, Incheon	
September 25	19th Seoul International Drama Awards	Bae Sung-jae; Seol In-ah	KBS Hall, Seoul	
October 6	2024 Asia Contents Awards & Global OTT Awards	Kang Ki-young; Tiffany Young	BIFF Theater, Busan Cinema Center, Busan	
October 12	15th Korea Drama Awards	Lee Sang-min; Oh Jung-yeon	Grand Performance Hall, Gyeongnam Culture and Arts Center, Jinju	
December 21	2024 SBS Drama Awards	Shin Dong-yup; Kim Hye-yoon; Kim Ji-yeon	Sangam-dong, Mapo-gu, Seoul	
December 27	9th Asia Artist Awards	Jang Won-young; Sung Han-bin; Ryu Jun-yeol	Impact Challenger Hall, Muang Thong Thani, Bangkok, Thailand	
December 28	2024 APAN Star Awards	Kim Seung-woo; Park Sun-young	Dongdaemun Design Plaza Arthall 1 Jung-gu, Seoul	
December 31	2024 KBS Drama Awards	Jang Sung-kyu; Seohyun; Moon Sang-min	KBS Hall in Yeouido, Seoul	

== See also ==
- List of Korean dramas
- 2023–24 Canadian network television schedule
- 2023–24 United States network television schedule
