= The Love in Your Eyes (TV series) =

2022–23 South Korean television series

- Promotional poster
- Hangul: 내 눈에 콩깍지
- RR: Nae nune kongkkakji
- MR: Nae nune k'ongkkakchi
- Genre: Melodrama; Romance; Family
- Written by: Na Seung-hyun
- Directed by: Go Young-tak
- Starring: Baek Sung-hyun; Bae Noo-ri; Choi Yoon-ra; Jung Soo-hwan
- No. of episodes: 123

Original release
- Network: KBS1
- Release: October 3, 2022 – March 24, 2023

The Love in Your Eyes (Korean: 내 눈에 콩깍지) is a South Korean television series starring Baek Sung-hyun, Bae Noo-ri, Choi Yoon-ra, and Jung Soo-hwan. It aired on KBS1 from October 3, 2022, to March 24, 2023, every weekday at 20:30 (KST).

== Synopsis ==
Lee Young-yi, who lost her husband at a young age, moves on with her new one's family and works daily for her daughter. She dreams to go beyond working part-time at a convenience store and become a full-time employee at the head office. Meanwhile, Jang Kyung-joon, the eldest grandson of TS Retail, underwent a corneal transplant five years ago with a donation from Young-yi's late husband and gained a new vision and a new life. The series revolves around the romantic adventures of Young-yi and her second love, Kyung-joon, who has the eyes of her late husband.

== Cast ==
=== Main ===
- Baek Sung-hyun as Jang Kyung-joon
- Bae Noo-ri as Lee Young-yi
- Choi Yoon-ra as Kim Hae-mi
- Jung Soo-hwan as Jang Se-joon

=== Supporting ===
- Lee Ho-jae as Chairman Jang
- Jung Hye-sun as So Bok-hee
- Park Chul-ho as Kim Chang-il
- Park Soon-cheon as Oh Eun-seok
- Kim Seung-wook as Jang Yi-jae
- Kyung-sook as Cha Yoon-hee
- Choi Jin-ho as Kim Chang-yi
- Lee Ah-hyun as Seo Hwa-kyung

== Production and release ==
Director Go Young-tak collaborated with writer Na Seung-hyun, who has demonstrated her solid yet fast-paced writing skills in the drama Crazy Love (2013). On September 14, 2022, it was announced that Baek Sung-hyun, Bae Noo-ri, Choi Yoon-ra, Jung Soo-hwan, Lee Ho-jae, Jung Hye-sun, Park Cheol-ho, Park Soon-cheon, Kim Seung-wook, Kyung-sook, Choi Jin-ho, and Lee Ah-hyun worked together for the series. The series aired every weekday on KBS1 at 20:30 (KST).
