= Tears of Heaven (TV series) =

2014 South Korean television series

- Title card
- Hangul: 천국의 눈물
- Hanja: 天國의 눈물
- RR: Cheongugui nunmul
- MR: Ch'ŏn'gugŭi nunmul
- Genre: Romance; Family; Melodrama; Revenge
- Created by: MBN Production plan
- Written by: Kim Yoon-shin; Heo In-moo
- Directed by: Yoo Je-won
- Starring: Park Ji-young; Hong Ah-reum; Seo Jun-young; Jo Yun-seo
- Music by: Lim Ha-young
- Country of origin: South Korea
- Original language: Korean
- No. of episodes: 25

Production
- Executive producer: Hwang Hyuk
- Producers: Bae Jong-byung; Kim Ji-yeon; Kim Sung-min; Lee Hyang-bong
- Production location: Korea
- Running time: 70 minutes
- Production company: Neo Entertainment

Original release
- Network: Maeil Broadcasting Network
- Release: October 11, 2014 – January 3, 2015

Tears of Heaven (Korean: 천국의 눈물; RR: Cheongugui nunmul) is a 2014 South Korean television drama series starring Park Ji-young, Hong Ah-reum, Seo Jun-young and Jo Yun-seo. It aired on MBN from October 11, 2014, to January 3, 2015, for 25 episodes.

== Plot ==
Yoon Cha-young learns that her mother Yoo Sun-kyung abandoned her as a child because of selfish ambition, so she seeks her out to get her revenge

== Cast ==
=== Main characters ===
- Park Ji-young as Yoo Sun-kyung
  - Seo Yoon-ah as young Yoo Sun-kyung
- Hong Ah-reum as Yoon Cha-young
  - Jeon Min-seo as young Yoon Cha-young
- Seo Jun-young as Lee Ki-hyun / Cha Sung-tan
- Jo Yun-seo as Jin Je-in
  - Kim So-yeon as young Jin Je-in
- Lee Jong-won as Lee Do-yeob
- Yoon Da-hoon as Jin Hyun-tae
- Kim Yeo-jin as Pan Hye-jung
- In Gyo-jin as Jin Hyun-woong

=== Supporting characters ===
- Park Geun-hyung as Jin Man-bok
- Yoon Joo-sang as Lee Gook-hwan
- Park Jung-soo as Mrs. Jo
- Lee Yong-yi as Yoon Eun-ja
- Choi Hyun as Park Man-ki
- Yoon Sang-hoon as Secretary Cha
- Joo Min-ha as Go Jung-eun

=== Cameo appearances ===
- Lee Han-wi as Orphanage director
- Jin Kyung as Adoptive mother
- Lee Byung-wook as Adoptive father

== Remake ==
The drama was remade in Turkish language as Cennet'in Gözyaşları.
