= Suji & Uri =

2024 South Korean television series

- Promotional poster
- Hangul: 수지맞은 우리
- Lit.: We Are a Match Made In Heaven
- RR: Sujimajeun uri
- MR: Sujimajŭn uri
- Genre: Romance; Family
- Written by: Nam Sun-hye
- Directed by: Park Ki-hyun
- Starring: Hahm Eun-jung; Baek Sung-hyun; Oh Hyun-kyung; Kang Byul; Shin Jung-yoon
- Music by: Choi In-hee
- Country of origin: South Korea
- Original language: Korean
- No. of episodes: 128

Production
- Executive producer: Kim Young-joo
- Producers: Bae Eun-hye; Seok Shin-ho; Park Chun-ho; Ahn Je-hyun; Shin Sang-yoon
- Running time: 30–35 minutes
- Production companies: Monster Union; Samhwa Networks

Original release
- Network: KBS1
- Release: March 25 – October 4, 2024

Suji & Uri (Korean: 수지맞은 우리) is a 2024 South Korean television series starring Hahm Eun-jung, Baek Sung-hyun, Oh Hyun-kyung, Kang Byul, and Shin Jung-yoon. It premiered on KBS1 from March 25 to October 4, 2024, at 20:30 (KST).

== Synopsis ==
Suji & Uri tells the story of Jin Soo-ji, a celebrity psychiatrist who is a perfectionist. However, her life changed as accidents occurs constantly, and Chae Woo-ri – a novice doctor whom place the patient's health as the highest priority – often clashes with Soo-ji on opinions. As Soo-ji falls from her grace after several scandals, Woo-ri become concerned and started helping her.

== Cast and characters ==
=== Main ===
- Hahm Eun-jung as Jin Soo-ji
- Baek Sung-hyun as Chae Woo-ri
- Oh Hyun-kyung as Oh Seon-young, the owner and chef of Korean restaurant Madang House.
- Kang Byul as Jin Na-young, Soo-ji's sister who dreams of becoming a reporter.
- Shin Jung-yoon as Han Hyun-sung, head of management planning at Haedeul Hospital.

=== Supporting ===
==== People around Soo-ji and Na-young ====
- Yoon Da-hoon as Jin Jang-soo, Soo-ji and Na-young's father.
- Jo Mi-ryung as Jang Yoon-ja, Soo-ji's stepmother and Na-young's biological mother.
- Seo Kwon-soon as Park Bok-sun, Soo-ji's grandmother and Jang-soo's mother.
- Kim Jong-hun as Jin Do-young, Soo-ji's younger brother.

==== People around Seon-young ====
- Im Ho as Kang Woo-chang, Seon-young's husband and sous-chef at Madang House.
- Lee Sang-sook as Kang Jung-soon, Woo-chang's older sister and waitress at Madang House.
- Song Ye-bin as Chae Doo-ri, Seon-young's adopted daughter and Woo-ri's younger sister.
- Yoon Chae-na as Jo Ah-ra, a child adopted by Seon-young after abandoned by an employee at Madang House.

==== People around Hyun-sung ====
- Sunwoo Jae-duk as Han Jin-tae, a neurosurgeon at Haedeul Hospital.
- Kim Hee-jung as Kim Ma-ri, Jin-tae's wife who serves as chairwoman of Haedeul Hospital.

==== People at Haedeul Hospital ====
- Kim Gwang-young as Mo Young-su, head of Department of Psychiatry and Soo-ji's mentor.
- Lee Si-young as Yoon Ga-rim, a nurse at Department of Psychiatric and Soo-ji's friend.
- Kim Young-hoon as Ahn Soo-bin, assistant nurse at Department of Psychiatric.

=== Others ===
- Jung Tae-ryeong as Kim Joo-hee

== Original soundtrack ==
=== Part 1 ===
Released on March 25, 2024
No.	Title	Lyrics	Music	Artist	Length
1.	"Only You"	Invincible W; Ahn Sol-hee	Invincible W; Ahn Sol-hee; Jimin (Jak); Ham Ha-bin	Serin	3:52
2.	"Only You" (Inst.)		Invincible W; Ahn Sol-hee; Jimin (Jak); Ham Ha-bin		3:52
Total length:					7:44

=== Part 2 ===
Released on April 1, 2024
No.	Title	Lyrics	Music	Artist	Length
1.	"Cocktail Love" (칵테일 사랑)	Kim Seon-min	Kim Seon-min; Go Byung-sik; Lee Hyung-sung	Saera	3:35
2.	"Cocktail Love" (칵테일 사랑; Inst.)		Kim Seon-min; Go Byung-sik; Lee Hyung-sung		3:35
Total length:					7:10

=== Part 3 ===
Released on April 8, 2024
No.	Title	Lyrics	Music	Artist	Length
1.	"Really Like U"	Go Byung-sik	Go Byung-sik; Buzzer Beater	Soulcry	3:52
2.	"Really Like U" (Inst.)		Go Byung-sik; Buzzer Beater		3:52
Total length:					7:44

=== Part 4 ===
Released on April 15, 2024
No.	Title	Lyrics	Music	Artist	Length
1.	"Cocktail Love" (칵테일 사랑)	Kim Seon-min	Kim Seon-min; Go Byung-sik; Lee Hyung-sung	Saera; Lee Hanul	3:35
2.	"Cocktail Love" (칵테일 사랑; Inst.)		Kim Seon-min; Go Byung-sik; Lee Hyung-sung		3:35
Total length:					7:10

=== Part 5 ===
Released on April 22, 2024
No.	Title	Lyrics	Music	Artist	Length
1.	"Loving You"	Invincible W; Andy Joe	Invincible W; Andy Joe	1set	3:04
2.	"Loving You" (Inst.)		Invincible W; Andy Joe		3:04
Total length:					6:08

=== Part 6 ===
Released on April 29, 2024
No.	Title	Lyrics	Music	Artist	Length
1.	"One Step" (한걸음)	Invincible W; Ahn Sol-hee	Invincible W; Ahn Sol-hee; Lee Han	Welle	3:46
2.	"One Step" (한걸음; Inst.)		Invincible W; Ahn Sol-hee; Lee Han		3:46
Total length:					7:32

=== Part 7 ===
Released on May 6, 2024
No.	Title	Lyrics	Music	Artist	Length
1.	"A Good Lie" (착한 거짓말)	Invincible W; Lydia	Invincible W; Lydia; Jang Seok-won; Han Sang-hyun; Yoon Hye-young	Lydia	3:17
2.	"A Good Lie" (착한 거짓말; Inst.)		Invincible W; Lydia; Jang Seok-won; Han Sang-hyun; Yoon Hye-young		3:17
Total length:					6:34

=== Part 8 ===
Released on May 13, 2024
No.	Title	Lyrics	Music	Artist	Length
1.	"Monthly" (월차[月次])	Kingmaker; Invincible W; Jeon Jeong-hyeon	Kingmaker; Invincible W; Oee; Heather Sun	Song Pu-reum	3:46
2.	"Monthly" (월차[月次]; Inst.)		Kingmaker; Invincible W; Oee; Heather Sun		3:46
Total length:					7:32

== Viewership ==
Suji & Uri : South Korea viewers per episode (millions)

Episodes	Episode number																							
Episodes	1	2	3	4	5	6	7	8	9	10	11	12	13	14	15	16	17	18	19	20	21	22	23	24
1–24	2.120	1.841	1.920	1.913	1.613	1.929	1.795	1.945	1.873	1.637	1.959	1.722	1.786	1.645	1.972	1.743	1.763	1.775	1.597	1.825	1.795	1.908	1.917	1.680
25–48	1.962	1.808	1.905	1.962	1.611	2.121	2.038	1.821	1.942	1.797	2.006	1.919	2.216	2.045	1.785	1.885	2.006	1.963	1.936	1.922	2.060	2.070	2.010	2.130
49–72	1.846	2.063	2.018	1.910	1.902	1.741	2.013	1.911	2.031	2.023	2.001	2.059	2.078	2.111	2.183	2.179	2.075	2.159	2.215	2.040	2.206	2.373	2.145	2.226
73–96	2.118	2.206	2.298	2.185	2.144	2.156	2.098	2.332	2.333	2.346	2.399	2.207	2.419	2.290	2.323	2.513	2.292	2.204	2.329	2.223	2.417	2.298	2.504	2.385
97–120	2.411	2.288	2.457	2.473	2.380	2.581	2.345	2.431	2.287	2.326	2.326	2.241	2.423	2.319	2.434	2.409	2.413	2.099	1.790	2.049	2.441	2.271	2.437	2.588
121–128	2.480	2.573	2.280	2.501	2.512	2.272	2.605	2.304	TBD	TBD	–													

Source: Audience measurement performed nationwide by Nielsen Korea.

Average TV viewership ratings
Ep.	Original broadcast date	Average audience share	
Ep.	Original broadcast date	Nielsen Korea	
Ep.	Original broadcast date	Nationwide	Seoul
1	March 25, 2024	12.6% (1st)	10.8% (1st)
2	March 26, 2024	10.8% (2nd)	9.0% (3rd)
3	March 27, 2024	11.6% (1st)	10.3% (1st)
4	March 28, 2024	11.4% (1st)	9.7% (1st)
5	March 29, 2024	9.4% (2nd)	8.1% (2nd)
6	April 1, 2024	11.8% (1st)	10.4% (1st)
7	April 2, 2024	10.0% (1st)	8.4% (1st)
8	April 3, 2024	12.2% (1st)	10.9% (1st)
9	April 4, 2024	11.8% (1st)	10.1% (1st)
10	April 5, 2024	10.0% (2nd)	8.3% (2nd)
11	April 8, 2024	11.3% (1st)	9.5% (1st)
12	April 9, 2024	10.7% (1st)	9.6% (1st)
13	April 11, 2024	10.8% (1st)	9.1% (1st)
14	April 12, 2024	9.7% (2nd)	8.0% (3rd)
15	April 15, 2024	12.1% (1st)	10.3% (1st)
16	April 16, 2024	10.3% (1st)	8.8% (1st)
17	April 17, 2024	10.6% (1st)	8.8% (1st)
18	April 18, 2024	10.8% (1st)	9.2% (1st)
19	April 19, 2024	9.6% (2nd)	8.4% (2nd)
20	April 22, 2024	10.9% (1st)	8.9% (1st)
21	April 23, 2024	10.6% (1st)	9.0% (1st)
22	April 24, 2024	11.5% (1st)	10.2% (1st)
23	April 25, 2024	11.6% (1st)	10.0% (1st)
24	April 26, 2024	10.1% (2nd)	8.3% (3rd)
25	April 29, 2024	11.6% (1st)	9.5% (1st)
26	April 30, 2024	10.4% (1st)	8.7% (1st)
27	May 1, 2024	10.7% (1st)	9.2% (1st)
28	May 2, 2024	11.6% (1st)	9.7% (1st)
29	May 3, 2024	9.6% (1st)	8.0% (3rd)
30	May 6, 2024	12.2% (1st)	10.2% (1st)
31	May 7, 2024	11.8% (1st)	9.8% (1st)
32	May 8, 2024	11.1% (1st)	9.0% (1st)
33	May 9, 2024	11.6% (1st)	9.6% (1st)
34	May 10, 2024	10.8% (1st)	9.2% (2nd)
35	May 13, 2024	11.6% (1st)	9.8% (1st)
36	May 14, 2024	11.4% (1st)	10.3% (1st)
37	May 15, 2024	12.3% (1st)	10.7% (1st)
38	May 16, 2024	12.4% (1st)	10.6% (1st)
39	May 17, 2024	10.9% (1st)	9.2% (2nd)
40	May 20, 2024	11.4% (1st)	9.2% (1st)
41	May 21, 2024	12.0% (1st)	10.3% (1st)
42	May 22, 2024	11.6% (1st)	9.5% (1st)
43	May 23, 2024	11.4% (1st)	9.8% (1st)
44	May 24, 2024	11.1% (1st)	9.9% (1st)
45	May 27, 2024	12.3% (1st)	10.2% (1st)
46	May 28, 2024	11.8% (1st)	10.0% (1st)
47	May 29, 2024	12.2% (1st)	10.4% (1st)
48	May 30, 2024	12.9% (1st)	10.5% (1st)
49	May 31, 2024	11.1% (1st)	9.1% (1st)
50	June 3, 2024	12.3% (1st)	10.2% (1st)
51	June 4, 2024	11.8% (1st)	9.7% (1st)
52	June 5, 2024	12.1% (1st)	10.4% (1st)
53	June 6, 2024	11.9% (1st)	9.7% (2nd)
54	June 7, 2024	10.5% (1st)	8.1% (2nd)
55	June 10, 2024	12.3% (1st)	10.3% (1st)
56	June 11, 2024	11.8% (1st)	10.3% (1st)
57	June 12, 2024	12.4% (1st)	10.8% (1st)
58	June 13, 2024	12.7% (1st)	10.1% (1st)
59	June 14, 2024	11.6% (1st)	9.8% (1st)
60	June 17, 2024	12.7% (1st)	10.5% (1st)
61	June 18, 2024	12.3% (1st)	10.5% (1st)
62	June 19, 2024	13.1% (1st)	11.1% (1st)
63	June 20, 2024	13.4% (1st)	12.0% (1st)
64	June 21, 2024	11.5% (1st)	9.7% (1st)
65	June 24, 2024	12.6% (1st)	10.2% (1st)
66	June 25, 2024	12.4% (1st)	10.1% (1st)
67	June 26, 2024	13.0% (1st)	11.2% (1st)
68	June 27, 2024	13.2% (1st)	11.0% (1st)
69	June 28, 2024	11.9% (1st)	9.9% (2nd)
70	July 1, 2024	13.6% (1st)	11.8% (1st)
71	July 2, 2024	14.1% (1st)	12.5% (1st)
72	July 3, 2024	13.1% (1st)	12.0% (1st)
73	July 4, 2024	13.3% (1st)	12.0% (1st)
74	July 5, 2024	12.7% (1st)	11.3% (2nd)
75	July 8, 2024	14.1% (1st)	12.7% (1st)
76	July 9, 2024	13.2% (1st)	11.6% (1st)
77	July 10, 2024	13.4% (1st)	11.7% (1st)
78	July 11, 2024	12.5% (1st)	10.5% (1st)
79	July 12, 2024	12.4% (1st)	11.2% (1st)
80	July 15, 2024	13.9% (1st)	12.3% (1st)
81	July 16, 2024	14.1% (1st)	12.5% (1st)
82	July 17, 2024	13.6% (1st)	12.0% (1st)
83	July 18, 2024	14.1% (1st)	12.4% (1st)
84	July 19, 2024	12.7% (1st)	10.9% (1st)
85	July 22, 2024	14.3% (1st)	12.2% (1st)
86	July 23, 2024	13.5% (1st)	12.0% (1st)
87	July 24, 2024	13.5% (1st)	11.9% (1st)
88	July 25, 2024	14.4% (1st)	12.7% (1st)
89	July 26, 2024	13.4% (1st)	12.0% (2nd)
90	August 12, 2024	13.5% (1st)	11.7% (1st)
91	August 13, 2024	14.0% (1st)	12.7% (1st)
92	August 14, 2024	12.6% (1st)	11.0% (1st)
93	August 15, 2024	13.5% (1st)	11.8% (1st)
94	August 19, 2024	13.7% (1st)	11.8% (1st)
95	August 20, 2024	14.6% (1st)	12.2% (1st)
96	August 21, 2024	14.1% (1st)	12.4% (1st)
97	August 22, 2024	14.1% (1st)	11.9% (1st)
98	August 23, 2024	13.1% (2nd)	11.8% (2nd)
99	August 26, 2024	14.6% (1st)	12.8% (1st)
100	August 27, 2024	14.4% (1st)	12.9% (1st)
101	August 28, 2024	14.1% (1st)	12.2% (1st)
102	August 29, 2024	15.2% (1st)	13.5% (1st)
103	August 30, 2024	14.2% (2nd)	12.4% (2nd)
104	September 2, 2024	14.6% (1st)	13.0% (1st)
105	September 3, 2024	14.2% (1st)	12.3% (1st)
106	September 4, 2024	14.3% (1st)	12.4% (1st)
107	September 5, 2024	14.0% (1st)	12.5% (2nd)
108	September 6, 2024	13.3% (2nd)	12.4% (2nd)
109	September 9, 2024	14.8% (1st)	12.7% (1st)
110	September 10, 2024	14.1% (1st)	12.6% (1st)
111	September 11, 2024	14.5% (1st)	12.8% (1st)
112	September 12, 2024	14.8% (1st)	12.9% (1st)
113	September 13, 2024	14.4% (2nd)	13.0% (2nd)
114	September 16, 2024	12.1% (1st)	10.5% (1st)
115	September 17, 2024	10.5% (1st)	9.4% (1st)
116	September 18, 2024	12.9% (1st)	11.4% (1st)
117	September 19, 2024	15.0% (1st)	12.8% (1st)
118	September 20, 2024	13.7% (2nd)	12.2% (2nd)
119	September 23, 2024	14.3% (1st)	12.6% (1st)
120	September 24, 2024	15.6% (1st)	14.1% (1st)
121	September 25, 2024	14.8% (1st)	13.0% (1st)
122	September 26, 2024	15.7% (1st)	13.6% (1st)
123	September 27, 2024	14.1% (1st)	12.2% (2nd)
124	September 30, 2024	15.4% (1st)	13.6% (1st)
125	October 1, 2024	15.0% (1st)	13.9% (1st)
126	October 2, 2024	13.3% (1st)	12.5% (1st)
127	October 3, 2024	15.9% (1st)	14.1% (1st)
128	October 4, 2024	14.2% (1st)	12.8% (1st)
Average		12.6%	10.8%
In the table above, the blue numbers represent the lowest ratings and the red numbers represent the highest ratings.

== Awards and nominations ==
Award Ceremony	Year	Category	Recipient	Result	Ref.
Asia Star Entertainer Awards	2025	Best Leading Actor	Baek Sung-hyun	Nominated	
Asia Star Entertainer Awards	2025	Best Leading Actress	Hahm Eun-jung	Nominated	
KBS Drama Awards	2024	Popularity award ㅡ Actor	Baek Sung-hyun	Nominated	
KBS Drama Awards	2024	Popularity award – Actress	Hahm Eun-jung	Nominated	
KBS Drama Awards	2024	Drama of the Year – Daily Drama	Suji & Uri	Nominated	
KBS Drama Awards	2024	Top Excellence Award – Actor	Baek Sung-hyun	Nominated	
KBS Drama Awards	2024	Excellence Award – Actress in a Daily Drama	Hahm Eun-jung	Won	
KBS Drama Awards	2024	Excellence Award – Actress in a Daily Drama	Oh Hyun-kyung	Nominated	
KBS Drama Awards	2024	Excellence Award ㅡ Actor in a Daily Drama	Baek Sung-hyun	Won	
KBS Drama Awards	2024	Best Couple	Hahm Eun-jung and Baek Sung-hyun	Won	
KBS Drama Awards	2024	Best Supporting Actor	Yoon Da-hoon	Nominated	
KBS Drama Awards	2024	Best Supporting Actor	Kang Byul	Nominated	
KBS Drama Awards	2024	Best New Actor	Kim Jong-hun	Nominated	
KBS Drama Awards	2024	Best New Actor	Song Ye-bin	Nominated	
KBS Drama Awards	2024	Best Young Actress	Yoon Chae-na	Nominated	
APAN Star Awards	2024	Top Excellence Award ㅡ Actress in a Serial Drama	Hahm Eun-jung	Nominated	
APAN Star Awards	2024	Top Excellence Award ㅡ Actor in a Serial Drama	Baek Sung-hyun	Nominated	
APAN Star Awards	2024	Excellence Award ㅡ Actress in a Serial Drama	Oh Hyun-kyung	Won	
