= Yang Hye-ji =

South Korean actress (born 1996)

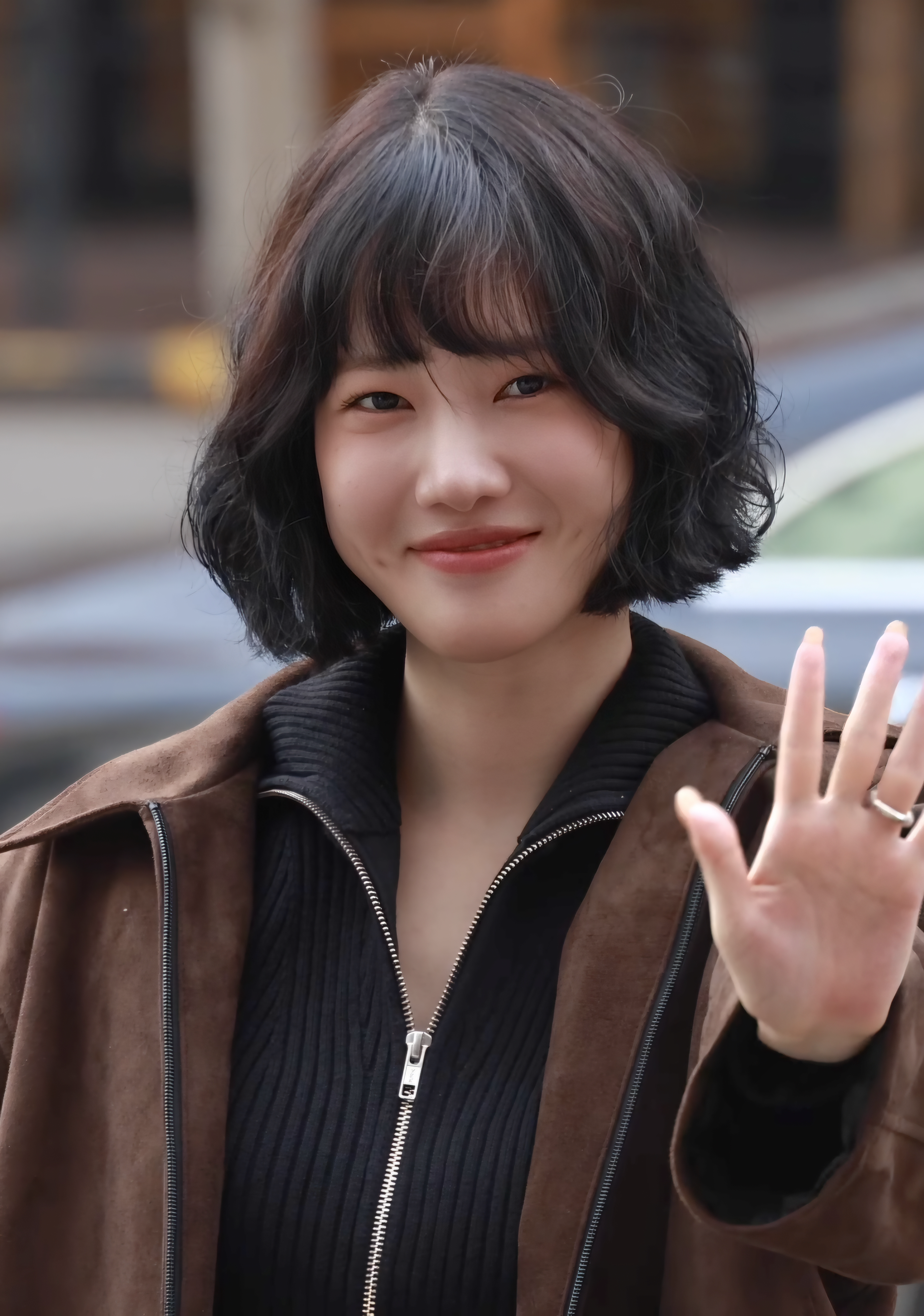
- Yang in January 2025
- Born: Yang Hye-ji; January 20, 1996 (age 30); South Korea
- Occupation: Actress
- Years active: 2016–present
- Agent: Awesome ENT
- Known for: Live On; Nevertheless; When the Weather Is Fine
- Relatives: Ahn Nae-sang (uncle)

Korean name
- Hangul: 양혜지
- RR: Yang Hyeji
- MR: Yang Hyeji

Yang Hye-ji (Korean: 양혜지; born January 20, 1996) is a South Korean actress. She is best known for her roles in dramas such as Live On, Nevertheless, When the Weather Is Fine, and The Rich Son.

== Early life and education ==
She is also related to actor Ahn Nae-sang, her uncle from the maternal side of the family.

== Filmography ==
=== Television series ===
Year	Title	Role	Ref.
2016	Secret Crushes 2	Yang Hye-ji	
2017	Secret Crushes 3	Yang Hye-ji	
2017	Secret Crushes: Special Edition	Yang Hye-ji	
2017	Drama Stage: The History of Walking Upright	Ja-yeon	
2018	The Rich Son	Park Seo-hee	
2018	Dear My Room	Sun-young	
2019	Failing in Love	Lee Si-won	
2019	Big Issue	Moon Bo-yeong	
2020	When the Weather Is Fine	Ji Eun-shil	
2020	Live On	Ji So-hyun	
2021	Nevertheless	Oh Bit-na	
2023	Revenant	Baek Se-mi	
2023	Sweet Home 2	Jung Ye-seul	
2024	Branding in Seongsu	Do Yu-mi	
2024	Wonderful World	Hong Su-jin	
2024	Bad Memory Eraser	Sae Yan	
2024	Iron Family	Lee Cha-rim	

=== Music video appearance ===
Year	Title	Artist	Ref.
2020	"Hello to You Today"	Lim Han-byul	

== Awards and nominations ==
Name of the award ceremony, year presented, category, nominee of the award, and the result of the nomination
Award ceremony	Year	Category	Nominee / Work	Result	Ref.
Korea Culture and Entertainment Awards	2018	Best New Actress in Drama	Yang Hye-ji	Won	
SBS Drama Awards	2023	Best New Actress	Revenant	Won	
