= Choi Woong =

South Korean actor

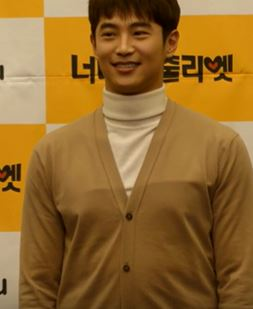
- Choi in February 2019
- Born: Choi Sun-woong; December 28, 1986 (age 39); Daegu, South Korea
- Education: Daekyeung University – Modeling
- Occupations: Actor; model
- Years active: 2011–present
- Agent: S-Entercom (에스엔터컴)
- Height: 183 cm (6 ft 0 in)

Korean name
- Hangul: 최선웅
- RR: Choe Seonung
- MR: Ch'oe Sŏnung

Stage name
- Hangul: 최웅
- RR: Choe Ung
- MR: Ch'oe Ung

Choi Woong (born Choi Sun-woong; December 28, 1986) is a South Korean actor and model. He starred in television series such as Secret Love (2013), and Descendants of the Sun (2016).

== Filmography ==
=== Film ===
Year	Title	Role	Notes/Ref.
2001	Sorum	Writer Lee's son	
2010	Republic of Korea 1%	3rd platoon 1st team	
2022	Days of Impression	Choi Cheol-gi	

=== Television series ===
Year	Title	Role	Notes
2012	Bridal Mask	Kagawa	
2013	Nine	Choi Jin-Cheol's secretary	
2013	Secret Love	Choi Kwang-soo	
2014	You're All Surrounded	Kim Shin-myung	Guest, episode 5–6
2014	Wonderful Days	Min Woo-Jin	
2015	Oh My Ghost	Joo Chang-gyu / Yoon Chang-sub	
2015	KBS Drama Special	Lee Joon-tae	Episode "Finding Argenta"
2016	Descendants of the Sun	Staff Sergeant Gong Cheol-ho (aka Harry Potter)	
2016	Weightlifting Fairy Kim Bok-joo	Kim Gi-seok	
2016	Guardian: The Lonely and Great God	Wang Yeo's junior grim reaper	
2017	Duel	Na Soo-ho	
2018	100 Days My Prince	Jung Sa-yeob	
2018	Clean with Passion for Now	Lee Do-jin	
2020	Money Game	Han Sang-min	
2020	No Matter What	Kang Dae-ro	
2024	Snow White's Revenge	Seo Jin-ho / Joo Woo-jin	

== Awards and nominations ==
Year	Award	Category	Nominated work	Result	Ref.
2016	Rookie Asia Awards	Rookie Award	Descendants of the Sun	Won	
