= Kim Gyu-seon =

South Korean actress (born 1988)

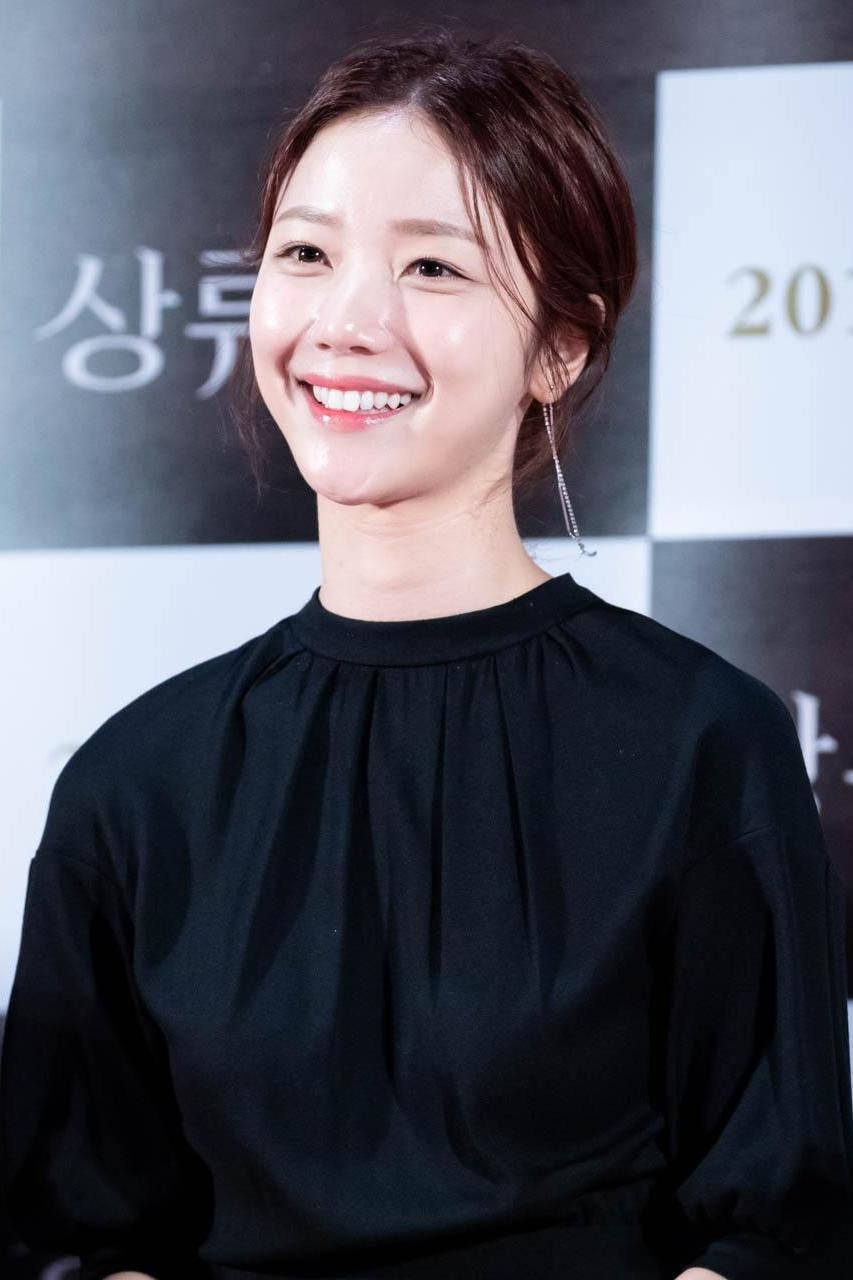
- Kim in 2018
- Born: July 26, 1988 (age 38); South Korea
- Education: Dongguk University
- Occupation: Actress
- Years active: 2010–present
- Agent: YK Media Plus

Korean name
- Hangul: 김규선
- RR: Gim Gyuseon
- MR: Kim Kyusŏn

Kim Gyu-seon (Korean: 김규선; born July 26, 1988) is a South Korean actress under YK Media Plus. She debuted as actress in The Woman Who Still Wants to Marry (2010).

== Early life ==
Kim was born on July 26, 1988, in South Korea. She was graduated from Dongguk University's Department of Theater and Film.

== Career ==
She debuted as an actress in the 2010 MBC drama The Woman Who Still Wants to Marry and has been actively working on both the big and small screens, appearing in films such as Fengshui, High Society, The King, and the SBS drama Big Issue. She has also appeared in The Eldest (2013), Hotel King (2014), Dr. Frost (2014), Enchanting Neighbor (2015), Splendid Politics (2015), Beautiful You (2015), and You Are Too Much (2017), which was spotlighted in the 2018 film High Society.

On March 13, 2020, YK Media Plus announced that they had recently signed an exclusive contract with her.

== Personal life ==
Kim married her boyfriend in a private wedding in Seoul on April 29, 2017.

== Filmography ==
=== Film ===
Year	Title	Role	Ref.
2018	High Society	Park Eun-ji	

=== Television series ===
Year	Title	Role	Ref.
2012	Salamander Guru and The Shadows		
2022–2023	Game of Witches	Jung Hye-soo	
2024	Snow White's Revenge	Min Joo-ryeon	
