= Moon Seong-hyun =

South Korean actor (born 2006)

- Born: June 2, 2006 (age 20); Seoul, South Korea
- Other name: Moon Sung-hyun
- Occupation: Actor
- Years active: 2021–present
- Agent: FNC Entertainment

Korean name
- Hangul: 문성현
- RR: Mun Seonghyeon
- MR: Mun Sŏnghyŏn

Moon Seong-hyun (Korean: 문성현; born June 2, 2006) is a South Korean actor.

== Filmography ==
=== Television series ===
Year	Title	Role	Ref.
2021	Hello, Me!	Chae Sung-woo / Chae Chi-soo	
2021	Vincenzo	young Jang Han-seok	
2021	Hometown Cha-Cha-Cha	Teenage Hong Du-sik	
2021	The One and Only	young Min Woo-cheon	
2022	Shooting Stars	young Gong Tae-seong	
2022	Alchemy of Souls	young Seo Yul	
2022	O'PENing - Stock of High School	Lee Ro-woon	
2022	Under the Queen's Umbrella	Prince Simso	
2022	Reborn Rich	young Jin Seung-jun	
2022–2023	The Interest of Love	young Ha Sang-soo	
2023	My Dearest	young Lee Jang-hyun	
2024	Queen of Tears	young Baek Hyun-woo	
2024	Beauty and Mr. Romantic	Go Dae-chung / young Go Pil-sung	

=== Web series ===
Year	Title	Role	Ref.
2022	The King of Pigs	young Kang Min	
2022	Stock Struck	teenage Im Ye-jun	
2024	The Chairman of Class 9	Na I-soo	

=== Hosting ===
Year	Title	Note(s)	Ref.
2024–present	Inkigayo	with Leeseo and Han Yu-jin	

== Awards and nominations ==
Name of the award ceremony, year presented, category, nominee of the award, and the result of the nomination
Award ceremony	Year	Category	Nominee / Work	Result	Ref.
APAN Star Awards	2024	Best Young Actor	Queen of Tears	Nominated	
KBS Drama Awards	2024	Best Young Actor	Beauty and Mr. Romantic	Won	
