= Yoon Da-hoon =

South Korean actor (born 1965)

- Born: Nam Kwang-woo; February 1, 1965 (age 61); Jongno-gu, Seoul, South Korea
- Education: Korea National Open University - Law
- Occupation: Actor
- Years active: 1980–present
- Agent: Vine Entertainment
- Spouse: Nam Eun-jeong (m. 2007)
- Children: Nam Kyung-min; Nam Ha-young

Korean name
- Hangul: 남광우
- Hanja: 南光祐
- RR: Nam Gwangu
- MR: Nam Kwangu

Stage name
- Hangul: 윤다훈
- Hanja: 尹多勳
- RR: Yun Dahun
- MR: Yun Tahun

Yoon Da-hoon (Korean: 윤다훈; born February 1, 1965), born Nam Kwang-woo, is a South Korean actor. He gained popularity with the sitcom Three Friends in 2000. Yoon has since starred in television dramas such as Guardian Angel (2001), Let's Get Married (2005), Don't Worry (2005), Hyena (2006), Please Come Back, Soon-ae (2006), and Three Men (2009), as well as the films Sky Doctor (1997), A Tearful Story (2000), and Family (2002). His daughter Nam Kyung-min is also an actress.

== Filmography ==
=== Television series ===
- TV's The Art of War (KBS2, 1987)
- The Winter of That Year Was Warm (KBS2, 1988)
- Tomorrow Love (KBS2, 1993) (guest, episodes 10-14)
- The Sorrow of the Survivor (KBS2, 1993)
- Han Myung-hoe (KBS2, 1994)
- Daughters of a Rich Family (KBS2, 1994)
- Men of the Bath House (KBS2, 1995)
- The Sweet Life (MBC, 1996)
- Color (KBS2, 1996) (episode: "Red")
- Project (KBS2, 1996)
- Propose (KBS1, 1997)
- Beautiful Her (SBS, 1997)
- Because I Love You (SBS, 1997)
- Bride's Room (KBS2, 1997)
- Wedding Dress (KBS2, 1997)
- Will Make You Happy (KBS2, 1998)
- Three Kim Generation (SBS, 1998)
- Now Is the Time to Love (SBS, 1999)
- The Boss (MBC, 1999)
- Three Friends (MBC, 2000)
- Guardian Angel (SBS, 2001)
- Lovers (MBC, 2001) (cameo)
- Who's My Love (KBS2, 2002)
- Detectives (SBS, 2003)
- Let's Get Married (MBC, 2005)
- Don't Worry (KBS2, 2005)
- Hyena (tvN, 2006)
- Please Come Back, Soon-ae (SBS, 2006)
- Aeja's Older Sister, Minja (SBS, 2008)
- Can Anyone Love (SBS, 2009)
- Three Men (tvN, 2009)
- Life Is Beautiful (SBS, 2010)
- Indomitable Daughters-in-Law (MBC, 2011)
- Gyebaek (MBC, 2011)
- Father Is Sorry (TV Chosun, 2012)
- Ji Woon-soo's Stroke of Luck (TV Chosun, 2012)
- Can't Live Without You (MBC, 2012)
- My Kids Give Me a Headache (jTBC, 2012)
- You Are the Best! (KBS2, 2013)
- Steal Heart (jtBC, 2014)
- Tears of Heaven (MBN, 2014)
- The Invincible Lady Cha (MBC, 2015)
- Persevere, Gu Hae-ra (Mnet, 2015)
- My Heart Twinkle Twinkle (SBS, 2015)
- Happy Home (MBC, 2016)
- The Promise (KBS2, 2016)
- Don't Dare to Dream (SBS, 2016)
- Saimdang, Memoir of Colors (SBS, 2017)
- The Miracle We Met (KBS, 2018)
- The Last Empress (SBS, 2018)
- My First First Love (Netflix, 2019)
- Vagabond (SBS, 2019)
- Love Twist (KBS2, 2021–2022)
- Suji & Uri (2024) as Jin Jang-soo

=== Film ===
- The Chameleon's Poem (1988)
- Flesh Market (1989)
- Korean Connection (1990)
- Marijuana (1990)
- Island Corn (1990)
- Seoul Evita (1991)
- Teenage Coup d'etat (1991)
- Coffee, Copy and a Bloody Nose (1994)
- My Father the Bodyguard (1995)
- Sky Doctor (1997)
- The Rules of a Gangster 3 (2000)
- Jakarta (2000)
- Tearful Story (2001)
- Out of Justice (2001)
- The Beauty in Dream (2002)
- Family (2002)
- Silver Knife (2003)
- Unstoppable Marriage (2007)
- The Outback (2012) (Korean dubbed)
- Awaiting (short film, 2014)
- It Will Work This (2021)

=== Variety show ===
- Live Today (SBS, 2012)
- Law of the Jungle in Kota Manado
- Mr. House Husband 2 (2021–present)

=== Radio program ===
- Radio Section with Yoon Da-hoon (MBC Standard FM, 2000-2002)

== Discography ==
Yoon and his costars from Three Friends, Park Sang-myun and Jung Woong-in, released the Christmas album Three Friends: Carol [bird] in 2000.
