= Baek Sung-hyun =

South Korean actor

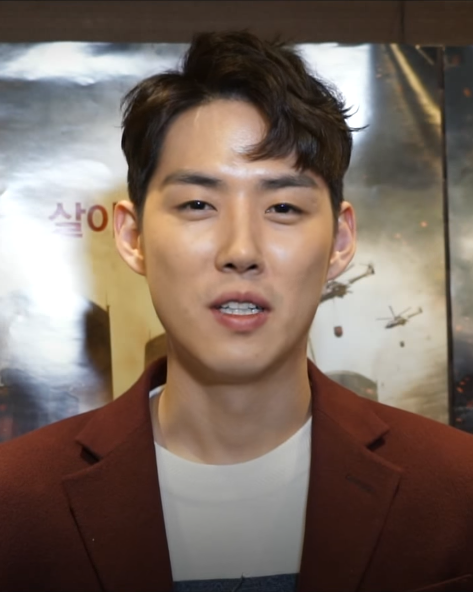
- Baek in December 2016
- Born: January 30, 1989 (age 37); Gwangmyeong, Gyeonggi-do, South Korea
- Education: Chung-Ang University - Media, Performing Arts, and Imaging Sciences
- Occupation: Actor
- Years active: 1994–present
- Agent: MUMW
- Spouse: Cho Da-bom (m. 2020)
- Children: 2

Korean name
- Hangul: 백성현
- Hanja: 白成鉉
- RR: Baek Seonghyeon
- MR: Paek Sŏnghyŏn

Baek Sung-hyun (Korean: 백성현; born January 30, 1989) is a South Korean actor.

== Career ==
Baek Sung-hyun made his acting debut in the 1994 film I Wish for What Is Forbidden to Me when he was five years old. The child actor practically grew up onscreen, playing the roles of an adorable son in several MBC series including See and See Again in 1998 and Ajumma (also known as Housewife's Rebellion) in 2000. As he entered his teenage years, he played the younger versions of male protagonists in dramas such as Damo (2003), Emperor of the Sea (2004) and Stairway to Heaven (2003) — the last his breakout role. Critics praised his acting that seemed more mature and romantic for his age.

Director Lee Joon-ik had previously wanted to cast Baek in his films King and the Clown and The Happy Life; he finally got to work with Lee in Blades of Blood (2010). Lee said he cast Baek as the character Gyun-ja who stands between the two main leads Hwang Jung-min and Cha Seung-won for he was "the only actor who can act as much as he can at such a young age," attesting to Baek's strong acting fundamentals.

He has since starred in a number of other films and TV series — sitcom Kokkiri (Elephant) (2008), high school comedy Our School's E.T. (2008), romantic comedy The Accidental Couple (2009), and period drama Insu, The Queen Mother (2011).

Of note is Baek's performance as a young marathoner in the four-episode Running, Gu (2010), his acting calm and gravitas in the eight-episode drama special White Christmas (2011), and his leading man turn in the youthful romance Melody of Love (2013).

On January 5, 2022, it was reported that Baek's contract with Sidus HQ has expired since December 2021. On January 25, 2022, Baek signed an exclusive contract with Weta Lab.

== Personal life ==
Baek enlisted on January 2, 2018, as a Marine Coast Guard to fulfil his mandatory military duties.

Baek married his girlfriend of four years on April 25, 2020. At the end of October 2020, Baek's wife gave birth to a daughter. Baek Sung-hyun and his daughter, Seo-yoon were cast members of the KBS2's variety show The Return of Superman. In February 2022, Baek announced that his wife was pregnant with their second child through the program The Return of Superman. Baek's wife gave birth to their second child, a son, at the end of July 2022.

== Filmography ==
=== Film ===
| Year | Title | Role | Notes/Ref. |
|---|---|---|---|
| 1994 | I Wish for What Is Forbidden to Me | Baek Joon | |
| 1998 | Scent of a Man | Kwon Hyuk-soo | |
| 2001 | Kiss Me Much | Lee Ji-oh | |
| 2005 | Marathon | Yun Jung-won | |
| 2007 | First Love | Joon-oh | |
| 2008 | Our School's E.T. | Baek Jung-goo | |
| 2009 | Sydney in Love | | short film |
| 2010 | Blades of Blood | Kyeon-ja | |
| 2012 | China Blue | Eun-hyuk | |
| 2013 | Iris II: The Movie | Kang Byung-jin | spin-off |
| 2013 | A Clear Night | Hong Kang-shik | |
| 2015 | Speed | Ma Goo-rim | |
| 2016 | Bittersweet Brew | Park Sung-du | |
| 2016 | Walking Street | Tae-sung | |
| 2017 | Father's War | Baek-hyeon | |
| 2020 | Iron Lady | | |
| 2024 | 1980: The Unforgettable Day | Chul-soo's Uncle | |

=== Television series ===
| Year | Title | Role | Notes | Ref. |
|---|---|---|---|---|
| 1995 | Blowing of the Wind | | | |
| 1996 | Lovers | Jung Jin-soo | | |
| 1998 | See and See Again | Seon-nam | | |
| 2000 | The Full Sun | Jang Ho-tae | | |
| 2000 | Ajumma | Jang Hoon | | |
| 2000 | Golden Era | Jo Sang-man | | |
| 2001 | Beautiful Days | Lee Min-chul (young) | | |
| 2001 | Sweet Bear | | | |
| 2002 | Five Brothers and Sisters | Han Woo-sik (young) | | |
| 2002 | Man of the Sun, Lee Je-ma | Lee Je-ma (young) | | |
| 2002 | Trio | Park Jun-ki (young) | | |
| 2003 | Damo | Hwangbo Yoon (young) | | |
| 2003 | Stairway to Heaven | Cha Song-joo (young) | | |
| 2004 | The Age of Heroes | Chun Tae-san (young) | | |
| 2004 | Emperor of the Sea | Jang Bogo (young) | | |
| 2007 | Kid Gang | Oh Han-pyo | | |
| 2008 | Elephant | Joo Sung-hyun | | |
| 2009 | The Accidental Couple | Han Sang-chul | | |
| 2010 | Running, Gu | Gu Dae-gu | | |
| 2011 | White Christmas | Park Mu-yeol | | |
| 2011 | Insu, the Queen Mother | Crown Prince Uigyeong / King Seongjong | | |
| 2012 | Big | Gil Choong-shik | | |
| 2013 | Iris II: New Generation | Kang Byung-jin | | |
| 2013 | Puberty Medley | Choi Jung-woo (adult) | | |
| 2013 | Melody of Love | Park Hyun-woo | | |
| 2014 | Cheo Yong | Jang Dae-seok | Episode 1, 9–10 | |
| 2015 | This Is My Love | Park Hyun-soo (27 years old) | | |
| 2015 | Splendid Politics | Crown Prince Sohyeon | | |
| 2015 | Live Shock | Eun-beom | one act-drama | |
| 2016 | The Doctors | Pi Yeong-gook | | |
| 2016 | Momin's Room | Hyun Woo | | |
| 2017 | Voice | Shim Dae-sik | | |
| 2017 | While You Were Sleeping | Do Hak-young | Episode 13–19 | |
| 2018 | A Poem a Day | Doctor | | |
| 2021 | Voice 4 | Shim Dae-sik | | |
| 2022–2023 | The Love in Your Eyes | Jang Kyung-joon | | |
| 2023–2024 | Korea–Khitan War | Mokjong of Goryeo | | |
| 2023 | Joseon Chefs | Kim Yeon | Drama Special, Season 14 | |
| 2023–2024 | Between Him and Her | Kim Jong-hyun | | |
| 2024 | Suji & Uri | Chae Woo-ri | Main role | |
| 2026 | Sword & Silence | Go Yeon-mu | | |

=== Web series ===
| Year | Title | Role | Notes | Ref. |
|---|---|---|---|---|
| 2014 | Love Cells | Chun Ji-woon | | |
| 2014 | Dreaming Executive | Oh Joong-gi | | |
| 2016 | Ready for Start | Kim Byung-chul | | |
| 2021 | The Magic | Kim Yeong-kwang | | |
| 2021 | Floor | | Audio drama | |

=== Variety show ===
| Year | Title | Notes | Ref. |
|---|---|---|---|
| 2010 | Star Donation Project: Baek Sung-hyun's Hope T-shirt | | |
| 2012 | Invincible Youth 2 | | |
| 2013 | World Challenge - Here We Go | | |
| 2013-2014 | Koica's Dream | | |
| 2016 | Neighbourhood's Private Life | | |
| 2022 | The Return of Superman | Regular Cast | |
| 2022 | Morning Worth Trying | Special MC | |

=== Music video appearances ===
| Year | Song title | Artist |
|---|---|---|
| 2004 | "Fool Who Cares About Only You" | Hero |
| 2007 | "Goodbye Sadness" | Goo Jung-hyun |
| 2009 | "Today's Horoscope" | Kim Hyung-joong |
| 2010 | "Sunflower" | SG Wannabe |
| 2012 | "Love Is All the Same" | Yangpa, Davichi and Hanna |

== Theatre/Musical ==
| Year | Title | Role |
|---|---|---|
| 2013 | Uncle Sooni | |
| 2016 | Procedure of Love | Jeong Juho |
| 2016 | Romantic Muscle | Kang Junsu |
| 2017 | Josee, The Tiger And The Fish | Tsuneo |

== Awards and nominations ==
| Award | Year | Category | Nominated work | Result | Ref. |
|---|---|---|---|---|---|
| APAN Star Awards | 2024 | Top Excellence Award ㅡ Actor in a Serial Drama | Suji & Uri | Nominated | |
| Asia Star Entertainer Awards | 2025 | Best Leading Actor | Suji & Uri | Nominated | |
| KBS Drama Awards | 2013 | Best New Actor | Melody of Love | Nominated | |
| KBS Drama Awards | 2013 | Netizen's Choice ㅡ Actor | Melody of Love | Nominated | |
| KBS Drama Awards | 2013 | Best Couple Award | Melody of Love | Nominated | |
| KBS Drama Awards | 2022 | Excellence Award ㅡ Actor in a Daily Drama | The Love in Your Eyes | Won | |
| KBS Drama Awards | 2024 | Popularity award ㅡ Actor | Suji & Uri | Nominated | |
| KBS Drama Awards | 2024 | Top Excellence Award ㅡ Actor | Suji & Uri | Nominated | |
| KBS Drama Awards | 2024 | Excellence Award ㅡ Actor in a Daily Drama | Suji & Uri | Won | |
| KBS Drama Awards | 2024 | Best Couple Award (with Hahm Eun-jung) | Suji & Uri | Won | |
| MAMA Awards | 2007 | Best Music Video Acting | Goodbye Sadness | Won | |
| Mnet 20's Choice Awards | 2008 | Hot Sitcom Star | Kokkiri | Won | |
