= Park Ji-young (actress) =

South Korean actress (born 1969)

- Born: January 25, 1969 (age 57); Jeonju, North Jeolla Province
- Occupation: Actress
- Years active: 1990–present

Korean name
- Hangul: 박지영
- Hanja: 朴志暎
- RR: Bak Jiyeong
- MR: Pak Chiyŏng

Park Ji-young (Korean: 박지영; born January 25, 1969) is a South Korean actress. She starred in TV series such as The Woman Who Still Wants to Marry (2010), Romance Town (2011), The Fugitive of Joseon (2013), Tears of Heaven (2014), Don't Dare to Dream (2016) Moon Lovers: Scarlet Heart Ryeo (2016), Save me (2017), The Red Sleeve (2021) and Love Next Door (2024).

== Filmography ==
=== Film ===
Year	Title	Role	Notes/Ref.
2007	The Show Must Go On	Mi-ryung	
2009	One Step More to the Sea	Yeon-hee	
2010	The Housemaid	Mi-hee	
2012	The Concubine	Queen mother	
2015	The Advocate: A Missing Body	Representative Joo	
2016	The Queen of Crime	Mi-kyung	
2019	Lingering	Kyung-sun	
2022	The Roundup	Kim In-suk	
2024	Hidden Face	Hye-yeon	

=== Television series ===
Year	Title	Network and Timeslot	Role	Notes/Ref.
1990	Two Diaries	MBC Saturday Drama	Hee-soo	One-act drama
1990	Rose of Betrayal	MBC Weekend Soap Opera		
1990	Dark Sky, Dark Bird	MBC Monday-Tuesday Drama		
1991	Chunsa Na Woon-gyu	MBC Wednesday-Thursday Drama		One-act drama
1991	Depend on Your Mind	SBS Wednesday-Thursday Drama	Hwa-young/Min Jin-nyeo	Lead role
1992	The Woman Who Walks on Water	SBS Monday-Tuesday Drama	Son Min-hee	Lead role
1992	Marigold	SBS Monday Drama	Im Moon-young	Lead role
1993	The Rooster Must Crow For Dawn to Come	SBS Saturday Drama		One-act drama
1993	Professor Oh's Family	SBS Weekend Sitcom	Oh Ji-young	Main role
1993	Our Hot Song	SBS Monday-Tuesday Drama	Ahn Young-mi	
1993	Love is Live	SBS Saturday Drama	Ji-young	
1993	When I Miss You	KBS1 Daily Soap Opera	Yoo Shin-hee	Lead role
1995	Chang Noksu	KBS2 Monday-Tuesday Drama	Chang Noksu	Lead role
1997	I Can't Forget	MBC Morning Soap Opera	Song Yoo-kyung	Lead role
1997	Three Guys and Three Girls	MBC Daily Sitcom		
1997	LA Arirang	SBS Sunday Sitcom		
1997	Sea of Desire	KBS2 Wednesday-Thursday Drama	Shin Eun-joo	Lead role
1997	River of Motherly Love	KBS1 TV Novel	Kim Hye-sook	Lead role
1998	As We Live Our Lives	KBS1 Daily Soap Opera	Choi Mal-ja	Main role
1998	Living With the Enemy: "I Wish You Would Die"	MBC Wednesday-Thursday Drama	Kyung-mi	One-act drama
1999	Invitation	KBS2 Monday-Tuesday Drama		
2000	Tough Guy's Love	KBS2 Weekend Soap Opera	Bae Sang-ran	Main role
2000	Daddy Fish	MBC Saturday Drama	Oh Young-joo	One-act drama
2001	Oriental Theater	KBS2 Weekend Soap Opera	Bae Ku-ja	Main role
2001	I Like Dong-seo	KBS2 Morning Soap Opera	Yoo Mi-young	Lead role
2002	Why Do I Have a Different Family Name From Dad?	MBC Wednesday-Thursday Drama	Seo Ji-yeon	One-act drama
2002	Girls' High School	KBS2 Morning Soap Opera	Jung Soon-joo	Lead role
2003	Perfect Love	SBS Weekend Drama	Park Yeon-woo	
2004	Woman on a Picnic	SBS Daily Soap Opera	Jin Hye-sook	Lead role
2004	Toji, the Land	SBS Weekend Soap Opera	Lee Im and Lee Hong's mother	
2006	MBC Best Theater: "Poisoning"	MBC Saturday Drama	Kang In-hae	One-act drama
2008	Who Are You?	MBC Wednesday-Thursday Drama	Kim Young-ae	
2010	The Woman Who Still Wants to Marry	MBC Wednesday-Thursday Drama	Choi Sang-mi	Main role
2011	Romance Town	KBS2 Wednesday-Thursday Drama	Oh Hyun-joo	Main role
2013	The Fugitive of Joseon	KBS2 Wednesday-Thursday Drama	Queen Munjeong	
2014	Tears of Heaven	MBN Weekend Drama	Yoo Soo-kyung	Lead role
2016	Don't Dare to Dream	SBS Wednesday-Thursday Drama	Bang Ja-young	Main role
2016	Moon Lovers: Scarlet Heart Ryeo	SBS Monday-Tuesday Drama	Queen Yoo	
2017	The Liar and His Lover	TVN Monday-Tuesday Drama	Yoo Hyun-jung	
2017	Save Me	OCN Weekend Drama	Kang Eun-shil	
2017	Distorted	SBS Monday-Tuesday Drama	Cha Yeon-soo	
2018	Wok of Love	SBS Monday-Tuesday Drama	Cha Seol-ja	
2019	Doctor Detective	SBS Wednesday-Thursday Drama	Gong Il-soon	
2019	VIP	SBS Monday-Tuesday Drama	Ha Tae-young	
2020	When I Was the Most Beautiful	MBC Wednesday-Thursday Drama	Kim Yeon-da	
2021	JTBC Drama Festa: "Off Route"	JTBC Monday-Tuesday Drama	Kang Kyung-ae	One act-drama
2021	Lost	JTBC Weekend Drama	Ah-ran	
2021	The Red Sleeve	MBC Friday-Saturday Drama	Head Court Lady Jo	
2022	It's Beautiful Now	KBS2 Weekend Soap Opera	Jin Su-jeong	Main role
2022	I Have Not Done My Best Yet	TVING/TVN Saturday Drama	Bong Yeon-ja	Main role
2022	Little Women	TVN Weekend Drama	Ahn Hee-yeon	Cameo
2023	Revenant	SBS Friday-Saturday Drama	Yoon Gyeong-moon	
2023	The Matchmakers	KBS2 Monday-Tuesday Drama	Park So-hyun	
2024	Love Next Door	TVN Weekend Drama	Na Mi-sook	Main role
2024	Iron Family	KBS2 Weekend Soap Opera	Go Bong-hee	Main role

=== Web series ===
Year	Title	Role	Ref.
2022	I Haven't Done My Best Yet	Bong Yeon-ja	

== Awards and nominations ==
Name of the award ceremony, year presented, category, nominee of the award, and the result of the nomination
Award ceremony	Year	Category	Nominee / Work	Result	Ref.
KBS Drama Awards	2022	Top Excellence Award, Actress	It's Beautiful Now	Nominated	
KBS Drama Awards	2022	Excellence Award, Actress in a Serial Drama	It's Beautiful Now	Won	
MBC Drama Awards	2021	Excellence Award, Actress in a Miniseries	The Red Sleeve	Nominated	
