= Han Bo-reum =

South Korean actress (born 1987)

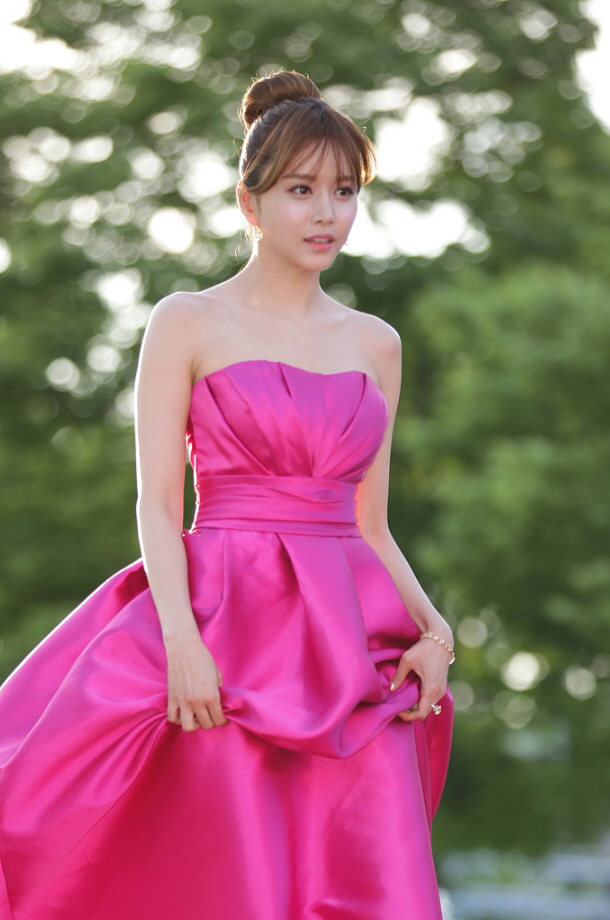
- Han in 2015
- Born: Kim Bo-reum; February 12, 1987 (age 39); South Korea
- Education: Myongji College – Theater and Visual Studies
- Occupation: Actress
- Years active: 2011–present
- Agent: Blitzway Entertainment

Korean name
- Hangul: 김보름
- RR: Gim Boreum
- MR: Kim Porŭm

Stage name
- Hangul: 한보름
- RR: Han Boreum
- MR: Han Porŭm

Kim Bo-reum (Korean: 김보름; born February 12, 1987), known professionally as Han Bo-reum, is a South Korean actress and model.

== Filmography ==
=== Film ===
| Year | Title | Role | Ref. |
|---|---|---|---|
| 2011 | Sunday Punch | Jin-ah | |
| 2013 | Queen of the Night | Jang-mi | |
| 2015 | Death Trip | | |
| 2015 | Chasing Hemingway | | |
| 2022 | Men of Plastic | | |

=== Television series ===
| Year | Title | Role | Ref. |
|---|---|---|---|
| 2011 | Dream High | Ha So-hyun | |
| 2013 | Pots of Gold | Lee Min-ah | |
| 2013 | Master's Sun | Hanna Brown/Cha Hee-joo | |
| 2013 | Drama Festival – "Principal Investigator - Save Wang Jo-hyun! " | Wang Yoo-mi/Wang Jo-hyun | |
| 2014 | Modern Farmer | Han Yoo-na | |
| 2015 | All is Well | Geum Jeongeun | |
| 2016 | Bring It On, Ghost | Miz (cameo) | |
| 2017 | Go Back | Yoon Bo-reum | |
| 2018 | Evergreen | Oh Ga-na's girlfriend (cameo) | |
| 2018 | Children of a Lesser God | Eom Yeon-hwa | |
| 2018 | Memories of the Alhambra | Ko Yoo-ra | |
| 2019 | Level Up | Sin Yeon-hwa | |
| 2020 | Homemade Love Story | Jang Seo-ah | |
| 2021 | High Class | So-Hee (Cameo Ep.7) | |
| 2022 | Insider | Annie Stephen | |
| 2023 | The Escape of the Seven | Noh Paeng-hee | |
| 2024 | Snow White's Revenge | Baek Seol-ah | |

=== Variety shows ===
| Year | Title | Role | Ref. |
|---|---|---|---|
| 2017 | King of Mask Singer | Contestant as Yoo Can Not Cry (Episode 133–134) | |
| 2018 | Law of the Jungle: Northern Mariana Islands | Cast member (Ep. 349–352) | |
| 2019 | Prison Life of Fools | Cast member (from episode 5) | |
| 2019 | Law of the Jungle in Myanmar | Cast member (Ep. 378–380, 382) | |
| 2019 | Craftsman | Cast member | |
| 2019 | Battle Trip | Cast member (Episode 169 & 170) | |
| 2022 | Hanbly | Host | |
| 2022 | Hole in Love | Host | |

=== Music video appearances ===
| Year | Song Title | Artist |
|---|---|---|
| 2010 | "Acquaintance" | Outsider |
| 2019 | "Untitled" (제목없음) | Hwang Chi-yeul |

== Awards and nominations ==
| Year | Award | Category | Nominated work | Result | Ref. |
|---|---|---|---|---|---|
| 2017 | 25th Korean Culture & Entertainment Awards | Best New Actress | Confession Couple | Won | |
| 2018 | Asia Model Awards | New Star Award | Han Bo-reum | Won | |
| 2019 | World Star Awards | Excellence Award | Han Bo-reum | Won | |
