= Dog Knows Everything =

2024 South Korean television series

- Also known as: Who Knows Your Secret
- Hangul: 개소리
- RR: Gaesori
- MR: Kaesori
- Genre: Comedy; Mystery; Fantasy
- Written by: Byeon Sook-kyeong
- Directed by: Kim Yoo-jin
- Starring: Lee Soon-jae; Kim Yong-gun; Ye Soo-jung; Im Chae-moo; Song Ok-sook
- Music by: Ha Geon-young
- Country of origin: South Korea
- Original language: Korean
- No. of episodes: 12

Production
- Executive producer: Kim Young-joo
- Producers: Kim Seok-hyeon; Choi Yun-seok; Lee Young-sook; Lee Sang-hyun
- Editor: Bae Young-joo
- Production company: iMTV

Original release
- Network: KBS2
- Release: September 25 – October 31, 2024

Dog Knows Everything (Korean: 개소리) is a 2024 South Korean television series starring Lee Soon-jae, Kim Yong-gun, Ye Soo-jung, Im Chae-moo and Song Ok-sook. It premiered on KBS2 on September 25, 2024, and aired every Wednesday and Thursday at 21:50 (KST).

== Synopsis ==
Soon-jae is shocked when he is forced to leave a drama he had been working on and even gets criticized by the public due to a misunderstanding that occurs during the process. In total despair, Soon-jae escapes to his house in Geoje-do. There, he meets Sophie the dog, and his life begins to change. Sophie was a police dog who had collected evidence for three years but retired due to an injury. One day, Sophie encounters Soon-jae, who can communicate with him. Sophie delivers clues to Soon-jae regarding the various mysteries that occur in the village. Soon-jae, who believed he was now useless, takes on a new challenge with Sophie.

== Cast and characters ==
- Lee Soon-jae as Lee Soon-jae
- Kim Yong-geon as Kim Yong-geon
- Ye Soo-jung as Ye Soo-jung
- Lim Chae-mu as Lim Chae-mu
- Song Ok-suk as Song Ok-suk
- Bae Jeong-nam as Sophie (voice)
- Park Sung-woong as Lee Ji-dong
- Yeonwoo as Hong Cho-won
- Lee Soo-kyung as Kim Si-kyung
- Tae Hang-ho as Yook Dung-joo

== Viewership ==
Dog Knows Everything : South Korea viewers per episode (thousands)

Season	Episode number											
Season	1	2	3	4	5	6	7	8	9	10	11	12
1	709	658	599	N/A	648	772	685	685	588	684	543	629

Source: Audience measurement performed nationwide by Nielsen Korea.

Average TV viewership ratings
Ep.	Original broadcast date	Average audience share (Nielsen Korea)	
Ep.	Original broadcast date	Nationwide	Seoul
1	September 25, 2024	4.2% (11th)	4.0% (11th)
2	September 26, 2024	4.1% (12th)	3.8% (12th)
3	October 2, 2024	3.5% (17th)	3.2% (17th)
4	October 3, 2024	3.7% (19th)	3.4% (17th)
5	October 9, 2024	4.0% (18th)	3.6% (15th)
6	October 10, 2024	4.6% (12th)	3.9% (13th)
7	October 16, 2024	3.9% (16th)	3.3% (17th)
8	October 17, 2024	4.3% (12th)	3.7% (14th)
9	October 23, 2024	3.8% (17th)	3.6% (16th)
10	October 24, 2024	4.4% (10th)	3.8% (14th)
11	October 30, 2024	3.3% (17th)	2.8% (17th)
12	October 31, 2024	3.6% (15th)	3.2% (19th)
Average		4.0%	3.5%
In the table above, the blue numbers represent the lowest ratings and the red numbers represent the highest ratings.
