= Beauty and Mr. Romantic =

2024 South Korean television series

- Teaser poster
- Hangul: 미녀와 순정남
- Hanja: 美女와 純情男
- Lit.: Beauty and the Devoted
- RR: Minyeowa sunjeongnam
- MR: Minyŏwa sunjŏngnam
- Genre: Romance; Coming-of-age
- Written by: Kim Sa-kyung
- Directed by: Hong Seok-gu
- Starring: Im Soo-hyang; Ji Hyun-woo
- Music by: Choi Chul-ho
- Country of origin: South Korea
- Original language: Korean
- No. of episodes: 50

Production
- Executive producer: Park Jeong-mi
- Producers: Kim Dong-rae; Yoon Hee-kyung; Seok shin-ho
- Editor: Kim Hayng-seok
- Running time: 70 minutes
- Production company: RaemongRaein
- Budget: ₩16 billion

Original release
- Network: KBS2
- Release: March 23 – September 22, 2024

Beauty and Mr. Romantic (Korean: 미녀와 순정남) is a 2024 South Korean television series starring Im Soo-hyang and Ji Hyun-woo. It aired on KBS2 from March 23, to September 9, 2024, every Saturday and Sunday at 19:55 (KST).

== Synopsis ==
Beauty and the Devoted tells the life-changing story of Park Do-ra, a top actress who falls to rock bottom overnight and Go Pil-sung, a novice drama producer who falls in love with her and brings her back up again.

== Cast and characters ==
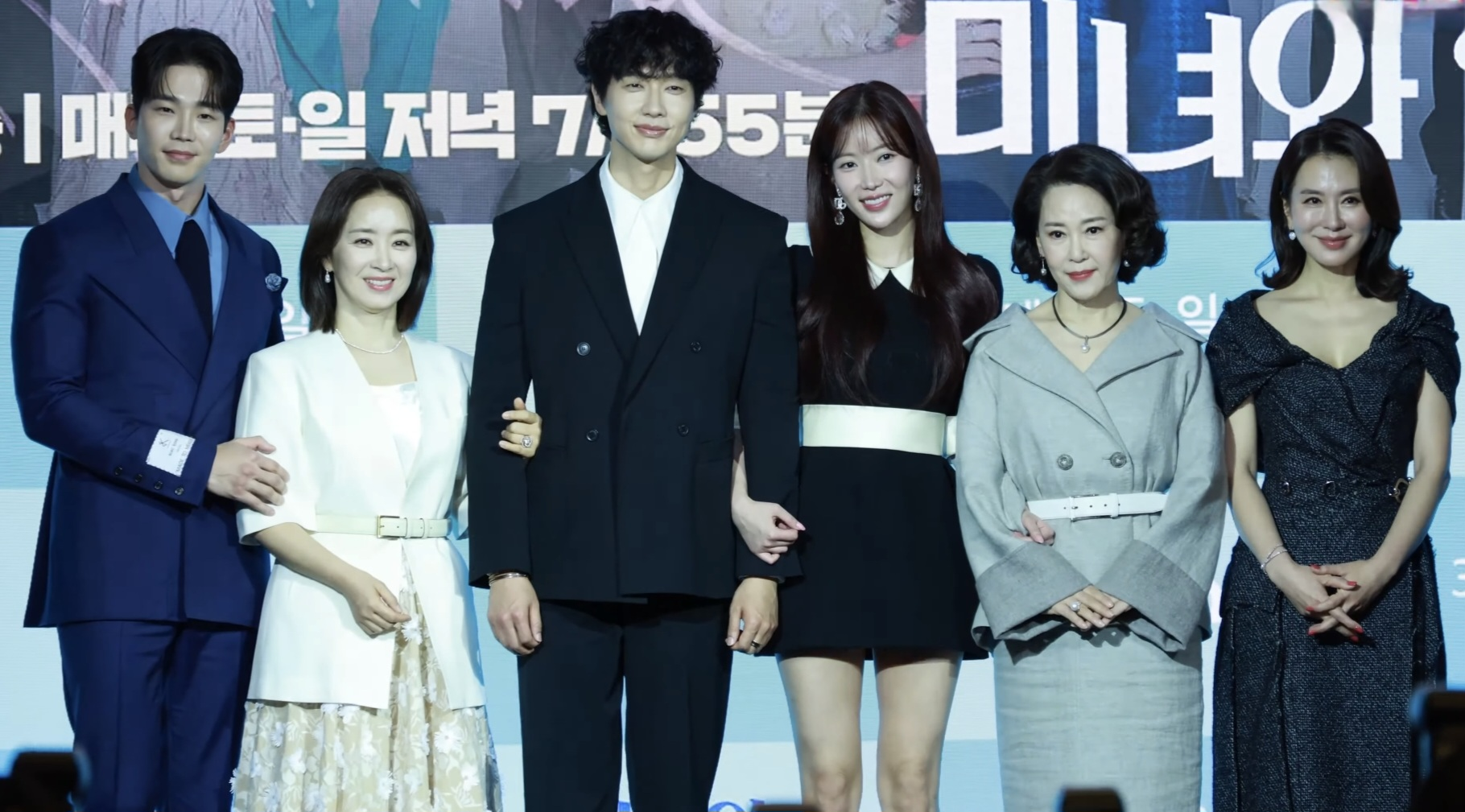
Beauty and Mr. Romantic cast at the press conference in March 2024

=== Main ===
- Im Soo-hyang as Park Do-ra / Kim Ji-young
  - Lee Seol-ah as young Park Do-ra
- Ji Hyun-woo as Go Pil-seung
  - Moon Seong-hyun as Go Dae-chung / young Go Pil-seung

=== Supporting ===
==== Do-ra's family ====
- Cha Hwa-yeon as Baek Mi-ja

Do-ra's mother.

- Yang Dae-hyuk as Park Do-sik

Do-ra's older brother.

- Lee Sang-jun as Park Do-jun

Do-ra's younger brother.

==== Pil-sung's family ====
- Yoon Yoo-sun as Kim Sun-young

Pil-sung's mother.

- Lee Doo-il as Go Hyun-cheol

Pil-sung's father.

- Im Ye-jin as So Geum-ja

Pil-sung's grandma.

- Lee Young-eun as Go Myeong-dong

Pil-sung's aunt who is a drama writer.

- Park Geun-hyung as Kim Joon-seop

Pil-sung's grandpa. Father of Sun-young.

==== Jin-taek's family ====
- Park Sang-won as Gong Jin-taek

Chairman of App Group.

- Lee Il-hwa as Jang Soo-yeon

Jin-taek's wife.

- Go Yoon as Gong Jin-dan

Jin-taek's half-brother.

- Kim Hye-sun as Hong Ae-kyo

Jin-dan's mother. Hidden mistress of Jin-taek's father.

- Jung Jae-soon as Gong Dae-sook

Jin-taek's aunt.

- Han Soo-ah as Gong Ma-ri

Only daughter of Jin-taek and Soo-yeon.

==== Others ====
- Heo Jin as Kim Kkot-bun
- Lee Seung-hyung as Hong Jin-gu

Pil-sung's senior and the director of the drama in which Do-ra appears.

- Kang Seong-min as Cha Bong-su

The male protagonist of the same drama as Do-ra.

- Won Yu-jin as Jo Bi-bi

A love-hate rivalry with Do-ra.

- Nam Jung-gyu as Lee Jae-dong

Do-ra's manager who cares for and follows Do-ra like her own older sister.

== Viewership ==
Beauty and Mr. Romantic : South Korea viewers per episode (millions)

| Episodes | Episode number | | | | | | | | | | | | | | | | | | | | | | | | |
| Episodes | 1 | 2 | 3 | 4 | 5 | 6 | 7 | 8 | 9 | 10 | 11 | 12 | 13 | 14 | 15 | 16 | 17 | 18 | 19 | 20 | 21 | 22 | 23 | 24 | 25 |
|---|---|---|---|---|---|---|---|---|---|---|---|---|---|---|---|---|---|---|---|---|---|---|---|---|---|
| 1–25 | 2.630 | 2.935 | 2.542 | 3.134 | 2.633 | 2.784 | 2.456 | 2.886 | 2.616 | 2.927 | 2.439 | 2.627 | 2.366 | 2.840 | 2.563 | 3.337 | 2.721 | 3.188 | 2.661 | 3.242 | 2.715 | 2.989 | 2.745 | 3.017 | 2.696 |
| 26–50 | 2.901 | 3.093 | 3.054 | 2.967 | 3.138 | 2.915 | 3.282 | 2.779 | 3.191 | 3.067 | 3.326 | 2.185 | 2.526 | 3.270 | 3.544 | 3.168 | 3.489 | 3.072 | 3.230 | 2.906 | 3.453 | 3.168 | 3.187 | 3.450 | 3.771 |

Source: Audience measurement performed nationwide by Nielsen Korea.

Average TV viewership ratings
| Ep. | Original broadcast date | Average audience share | |
| Ep. | Original broadcast date | Nielsen Korea | |
| Ep. | Original broadcast date | Nationwide | Seoul |
|---|---|---|---|
| 1 | March 23, 2024 | 15.3% (1st) | 14.1% (1st) |
| 2 | March 24, 2024 | 17.2% (1st) | 16.0% (1st) |
| 3 | March 30, 2024 | 14.9% (1st) | 13.9% (1st) |
| 4 | March 31, 2024 | 17.6% (1st) | 16.0% (1st) |
| 5 | April 6, 2024 | 15.0% (1st) | 14.2% (1st) |
| 6 | April 7, 2024 | 16.0% (1st) | 14.5% (1st) |
| 7 | April 13, 2024 | 14.4% (1st) | 13.5% (1st) |
| 8 | April 14, 2024 | 16.8% (1st) | 14.9% (1st) |
| 9 | April 20, 2024 | 14.8% (1st) | 13.1% (1st) |
| 10 | April 21, 2024 | 16.5% (1st) | 15.2% (1st) |
| 11 | April 27, 2024 | 14.1% (1st) | 13.1% (1st) |
| 12 | April 28, 2024 | 15.2% (1st) | 14.0% (1st) |
| 13 | May 4, 2024 | 13.0% (1st) | 11.8% (1st) |
| 14 | May 5, 2024 | 15.6% (1st) | 13.6% (2nd) |
| 15 | May 11, 2024 | 15.2% (1st) | 14.6% (1st) |
| 16 | May 12, 2024 | 18.3% (1st) | 17.1% (1st) |
| 17 | May 18, 2024 | 16.2% (1st) | 15.1% (1st) |
| 18 | May 19, 2024 | 18.4% (1st) | 17.1% (1st) |
| 19 | May 25, 2024 | 14.8% (1st) | 13.9% (1st) |
| 20 | May 26, 2024 | 18.1% (1st) | 16.8% (1st) |
| 21 | June 1, 2024 | 15.4% (1st) | 14.0% (1st) |
| 22 | June 2, 2024 | 17.2% (1st) | 15.7% (1st) |
| 23 | June 8, 2024 | 16.0% (1st) | 14.0% (1st) |
| 24 | June 9, 2024 | 17.0% (1st) | 16.1% (1st) |
| 25 | June 15, 2024 | 16.2% (1st) | 15.3% (1st) |
| 26 | June 16, 2024 | 17.2% (1st) | 16.4% (1st) |
| 27 | June 22, 2024 | 18.0% (1st) | 17.0% (1st) |
| 28 | June 23, 2024 | 17.9% (1st) | 17.0% (1st) |
| 29 | June 29, 2024 | 16.5% (1st) | 15.6% (1st) |
| 30 | June 30, 2024 | 18.3% (1st) | 17.2% (1st) |
| 31 | July 6, 2024 | 17.5% (1st) | 17.1% (1st) |
| 32 | July 7, 2024 | 18.6% (1st) | 17.8% (1st) |
| 33 | July 13, 2024 | 16.0% (1st) | 15.6% (1st) |
| 34 | July 14, 2024 | 17.9% (1st) | 17.2% (1st) |
| 35 | July 20, 2024 | 17.2% (1st) | 16.1% (1st) |
| 36 | July 21, 2024 | 19.2% (1st) | 18.2% (1st) |
| 37 | August 10, 2024 | 12.4% (1st) | 11.8% (1st) |
| 38 | August 11, 2024 | 14.0% (1st) | 14.0% (1st) |
| 39 | August 17, 2024 | 18.1% (1st) | 17.2% (1st) |
| 40 | August 18, 2024 | 19.5% (1st) | 17.4% (1st) |
| 41 | August 24, 2024 | 18.4% (1st) | 17.2% (2nd) |
| 42 | August 25, 2024 | 20.5% (1st) | 19.8% (1st) |
| 43 | August 31, 2024 | 18.3% (1st) | 17.4% (1st) |
| 44 | September 1, 2024 | 18.6% (1st) | 17.5% (1st) |
| 45 | September 7, 2024 | 16.6% (1st) | 15.3% (2nd) |
| 46 | September 8, 2024 | 19.8% (1st) | 18.7% (1st) |
| 47 | September 14, 2024 | 18.0% (1st) | 17.5% (1st) |
| 48 | September 15, 2024 | 18.0% (1st) | 16.5% (1st) |
| 49 | September 21, 2024 | 19.8% (1st) | 17.6% (1st) |
| 50 | September 22, 2024 | 21.4% (1st) | 20.4% (1st) |
| Average | | 16.9% | 15.8% |
In the table above, the blue numbers represent the lowest ratings and the red numbers represent the highest ratings.
