= Nothing Uncovered =

2024 South Korean television series

- Promotional poster
- Hangul: 멱살 한번 잡힙시다
- Lit.: Let's Get Grabbed By the Collar
- RR: Myeoksal hanbeon japhipsida
- MR: Myŏksal hanbŏn chaphipsida
- Genre: Melodrama; Thriller; Romance
- Based on: Let's Get Grabbed By the Collar by New Lucky
- Written by: Bae Soo-young
- Directed by: Lee Ho; Lee Hyun-kyung
- Starring: Kim Ha-neul; Yeon Woo-jin; Jang Seung-jo
- Music by: Choi In-hee
- Country of origin: South Korea
- Original language: Korean
- No. of episodes: 16

Production
- Executive producers: Ji Byeong-hyun (CP); Baek Hyun-ki; Choi Yoo-ri
- Producers: Park Chun-ho; Hwang Chang-woo; Jo Hye-rin; Woo Yeseu-ran
- Cinematography: Kim Gil-woong; Jo Tae-wook; Park Chan-joon; Ahn Deok-chul
- Editors: Son Yoon-kyung; Kim So-young
- Running time: 70 minutes
- Production companies: Monster Union; Production H

Original release
- Network: KBS2
- Release: March 18 – May 7, 2024

Nothing Uncovered (Korean: 멱살 한번 잡힙시다) is a 2024 South Korean melodrama thriller romance television series written by Bae Soo-young, co-directed by Lee Ho and Lee Hyun-kyung, and starring Kim Ha-neul, Yeon Woo-jin and Jang Seung-jo. Based on the Naver web novel of the same Korean name by New Lucky, it depicts the story of a reporter, who is suspected of being a murderer, and set to find out the truth to escape the problem. It aired on KBS2 from March 18, to May 7, 2024, every Monday and Tuesday at 22:10 (KST). It is also available for streaming on Coupang Play and Wavve in South Korea, on Kocowa in the Americas, and on Viu in selected regions.

== Synopsis ==
It is a melodrama chase thriller in which a reporter who catches bad guys by any means and a detective from the homicide team who handcuffs bad guys fall into a huge whirlpool while tracking down a series of murder cases together.

== Cast and characters ==
=== Main ===
- Kim Ha-neul as Seo Jung-won
  - Lee Su-jung as teen Seo Jung-won

A promising reporter who travels all over the scene and will do whatever it takes to get a scoop. She entangled in a love triangle with her ex-boyfriend Tae-heon and husband Woo-jae through a mysterious murder case.

- Yeon Woo-jin as Kim Tae-heon
  - Lee Seung-yeol as teen Kim Tae-heon

A detective and ace of the violent crime team He is also Jeung-won's ex-boyfriend and meets again through a murder case.

- Jang Seung-jo as Seol Woo-jae
  - Seong Tae as young Seol Woo-jae

A famous novelist, second-generation chaebol, and Jung-won's husband.

=== Supporting ===
- Jung Woong-in as Seol Pan-ho
  - Chairman of Mujin Group and Woo-jae's father.
- Yoon Je-moon as Mo Hyung-taek
  - A former prosecutor and National Assembly member who doesn't hesitate to cover up the truth. He is also in conflict with Jung-won.
- Han Chae-ah as Yu Yoon-young
  - Ha Sun-ho as young Yu Yoon-young

Director of You & Me Neuropsychiatry Hospital, who is also Jung-won's counselor.

==== People at Broadcasting Station ====
- Jung In-gi as Kang In-han

A news director of KBM Broadcasting Station and the first person to recognize Jung-won's star quality.

- Kim Min-jae as Ju Yeong-seok

A cameraman of "Nothing Uncovered" program. He often bickers with Jung-won, but an inseparable partner when they goes out reporting.

- Park Hyung-soo as No Ji-ho

A reporter at KBM Broadcasting Station and Jung-won's colleague. He is a person who's obsessed with an inferiority complex as he sees Jung-won always moving ahead of him.

- Kim Ji-sung as Yang Ae-na

The main writer of the program "Nothing Uncovered" and the oldest member of the exploration planning team. She is a good friend and strong supporter who gets along well with Jung-won.

- Seo Bum-june as Lee Ba-reun / Zeus
  - Hong Dong-yeong as young Lee Ba-reun
1. Lee Ba-reun: the youngest reporter covering on the program "Nothing Uncovered". An upright and pacifist person. He follows and likes Jung-won so much that he is called a Jung-won fanatic. He is also sincere, good at work, and has excellent information skills, so he is loved by his team's seniors.
2. Zeus: a mysterious person with no information is known and approached Jung-won directly and claimed to be an informant.

==== People at Police Station ====
- Yoon Jeong-hoon as Oh Myung-soo

Tae-heon's junior. He ran a soup restaurant and became a police officer after seeing his parents struggling with drunks, thugs, and gangsters. He and Tae-heon often argue but they care for each other as colleagues more than anyone else.

- Kim Yong-un as Team leader Jung

The warm-hearted eldest brother of violent crime team 1, who openly calls for complacency. He is always bothered by Tae-heon's recklessness, but he recognizes his unique ability and wants to support him.

==== Others ====
- Jung Ho-bin as Gong Joon-ho

Chairman Seol's secretary and his closest associate.

- Hong Ji-hee as Mo Soo-rin
  - Chu Ye-jin as young Mo Soo-rin

Owner of Soo Cafe and Hyung-taek's daughter.

- Han Ji-eun as Cha Eun-sae

An actress who is bold and outspoken.

- Yoon Ga-i as Chief Choi

A nurse at You & Me Neuropsychiatric Hospital.

- Go Geon-han as Cha Geum-sae

An attention-seeking YouTuber and gambling addict. He is also Eun-sae's younger brother that is like a parasite who lives by sucking money like blood.

- Kim Seung-hoon as Song Hyo-seong

An investigator who is loyal to Hyung-taek and knows a lot about him.

- Lee Seung-hun as Kim Min-chul

A management service company employee who is in charge of managing the Leaders Palace building.

=== Extended ===
- Lee Young-sook as Jin Myung-sook

Hyung-taek's housekeeper.

- Lee Da-yeon as Lee Na-ri

The victim of the Bongto Chemical Factory fire incident that occurred in Mueon City.

- Sung Ki-yoon as Seo Sang-gyeon

Jung-won's father who was a reporter.

=== Special appearance ===
- Danny Ahn as detective Cha

== Production ==
=== Development ===
The series is based on Naver web novel of the same name by New Lucky, which won the Grand Prize in the web novel mystery category at the 2020 Naver Webtoon & Web Novel World's Largest Contest (2020 네이버웹툰&웹소설 지상최대공모전). Writer Bae Soo-young, and directors by Lee Ho and Lee Hyun-kyung team up for the series. Monster Union and Production H managed the production.

=== Casting ===
Kim Ha-neul, Yeon Woo-jin, and Jang Seung-jo were cast for the main roles of the series and it was officially confirmed on January 10, 2024.

On January 12, 2024, Jung Woong-in, Yoon Je-moon, Han Chae-ah, Jung In-gi, and Kim Min-jae were confirmed to play various roles for the series.

=== Filming ===
Principal photography began in the second half of 2023.

== Release ==
KBS announced that the series would premiere on March 18, 2024, on KBS2 Monday–Tuesday lineup at 22:50 (KST). It is also available to stream on OTT platforms such as Coupang Play, Wavve, Kocowa, and Viu.

== Viewership ==
Nothing Uncovered : South Korea viewers per episode (thousands)

Season	Episode number															
Season	1	2	3	4	5	6	7	8	9	10	11	12	13	14	15	16
1	473	430	N/A	N/A	N/A	496	461	560	N/A	529	N/A	610	N/A	525	N/A	561

Source: Audience measurement performed nationwide by Nielsen Korea.

Average TV viewership ratings
Ep.	Original broadcast date	Average audience share (Nielsen Korea)	
Ep.	Original broadcast date	Nationwide	Seoul
1	March 18, 2024	2.8% (21st)	2.8% (18th)
2	March 19, 2024	2.7% (18th)	2.8% (18th)
3	March 25, 2024	2.8% (22nd)	2.9% (19th)
4	March 25, 2024	2.3% (27th)	N/A
5	April 1, 2024	2.9% (21st)	3.0% (19th)
6	April 2, 2024	3.2% (15th)	3.2% (14th)
7	April 8, 2024	2.9% (19th)	2.8% (17th)
8	April 9, 2024	3.8% (11th)	4.1% (10th)
9	April 15, 2024	2.3% (27th)	N/A
10	April 16, 2024	3.4% (12th)	3.4% (13th)
11	April 22, 2024	2.6% (22nd)	N/A
12	April 23, 2024	3.8% (12th)	3.8% (13th)
13	April 29, 2024	2.4% (23rd)	N/A
14	April 30, 2024	3.1% (15th)	3.8% (12th)
15	May 6, 2024	2.7% (23rd)	N/A
16	May 7, 2024	3.8% (13th)	4.0% (10th)
Average		3.0%	— (Note: Due to multiple unpublished ratings, the exact average rating is unknown.)
In the table above, the blue numbers represent the lowest ratings and the red numbers represent the highest ratings.; N/A denotes ratings that were not published.
