= Snow White's Revenge =

2024 South Korean television series

- Promotional poster
- Hangul: 스캔들
- Lit.: Scandal
- RR: Seukaendeul
- MR: Sŭk'aendŭl
- Genre: Melodrama; Romance; Revenge; Mystery
- Written by: Hwang Soon-young
- Directed by: Choi Ji-young
- Starring: Han Chae-young; Han Bo-reum; Choi Woong
- Music by: Lee Ji-yong
- Country of origin: South Korea
- Original language: Korean
- No. of episodes: 102

Production
- Executive producers: Park Ki-ho (CP); Hwang Jun-young
- Producers: Son Ok-Hyeon; Kim Han-seul; Bae Seong-su
- Running time: 30–35 minutes
- Production company: OH Story

Original release
- Network: KBS2
- Release: June 17 – November 29, 2024

Snow White's Revenge (Korean: 스캔들) is a 2024 South Korean television series starring Han Chae-young, Han Bo-reum and Choi Woong. The series unfolds as a woman who becomes a writer and joins her enemy's company to seek revenge by writing a script about her enemy, who killed her father. It aired on KBS2 from June 17, to November 29, 2024, every Monday to Friday at 19:50 (KST).

== Synopsis ==
Snow White's Revenge depicts the story of a woman who wants to own the world and another woman who risks everything for revenge.

== Cast and characters ==
=== Main ===
- Han Chae-young as Moon Jeong-in / Moon Gyeong-sook

The 54-year-old CEO of Jeongin Entertainment, born in 1970 as Moon Gyeong-sook. In 1999, she married a kind-hearted doctor, only to strangle him to death, steal his money to start her agency and scare his daughter into running away. After changing her name to Moon Jeong-in, she marries her older lover Min Tae-chang, but blames him for her misery as she dallies with politicians to gain power in the entertainment industry.

- Han Bo-reum as Baek Seol-ah/Park Jin-gyeong

A new drama writer. She lost her father and her wealth to her stepmother, Moon Gyeong-sook. Growing up in the care of her former nanny, she was about to marry her long-time boyfriend Seo Jin-ho, only to lose him too to the woman now known as Moon Jeong-in. She takes on the pen name Park Jin-gyeong and decides to use her popular drama Pokerface, produced unwittingly by Moon Jeong-in, to take revenge on her tormentors by making her life story public.

- Choi Woong as Seo Jin-ho / Joo Woo-jin

A passionate aspiring actor who loathes his life of juggling part-time jobs. When he was about to marry his childhood friend Baek Seol-ah, he loses his memory and begins to live as an actor to be groomed by Moon Jeong-in.

=== Supporting ===
- Kim Gyu-seon as Min Joo-ryeon

The daughter of Moon Jeong-in and the head of Jeong-in entertainment.

- Jeon Seung-bin as Na Hyun-woo

A star director.

- Jin Ju-hyung as Kim Seok-gi

A college senior of Min Joo-ryeon and head of Jeongin Entertainment's planning department.

- Oh Young-joo as Go Eun-byeol

The director of Skin Experience Research Institute.

- Kim Yu-i as Park Ji-yeon

A stylist.

- Kim Jin-woo as Na Seung-woo

Na Hyun-woo's younger brother. He is also an assistant director at a broadcasting company.

- Lee Byung-joon as Min Tae-chang

The husband of Moon Jeong-in and the chairman of Mind Trading company.

- Lee Sook as Nanda Park

The aunt of Park Il-joong.

- Jo Hyang-gi as Choi Mi-seon

The aunt of Baek Seol-ah and Il-joong's wife.

- Hwang Dong-joo as Park Il-joong

The uncle of Seol-ah and the husband of Choi Mi-soon.

- Lee Si-eun as Lee Seon-ae

The mother of Na Hyun-woo and Na Seung-woo.

- Choi Ryeong as Baek Dong-ho

The father of Baek Seol-ah.

=== Special appearance ===
- Moon Ji-hoo as Kang Eun-jae, the waiter (Ep. 1)

== Production ==
=== Development ===
On May 13, 2024, the video of the script reading session was revealed. Three days later, the first still cuts were released. This series is script writer Hwang Soon-young's 4th daily drama for KBS2, after Ruby Ring, Two Mothers and Red Shoes.

=== Casting ===
Han Chae-young and Han Bo-reum's casting was announced in April 2024. In May, the main leads' casting was confirmed. This marks Han Chae-young's comeback two years after starring in the cable drama Sponsor in 2022, as well as her first-ever regular appearance in a daily soap opera since she began acting in 2000. Speaking about her role as a 54-year-old evil stepmother, the 44-year-old Han Chae-young said: "I was very worried when I received the offer, but the character and script were very sparkly, and various complex stories were interesting... I wanted to try a long-breathing drama."

== Viewership ==
Snow White's Revenge : South Korea viewers per episode (millions)

Episodes	Episode number																									
Episodes	1	2	3	4	5	6	7	8	9	10	11	12	13	14	15	16	17	18	19	20	21	22	23	24	25	26
1–26	1.238	1.050	1.119	1.190	1.156	1.148	1.170	1.154	1.188	1.059	1.104	1.228	1.194	1.063	1.158	1.330	1.294	1.146	1.101	1.235	1.248	1.345	1.240	1.196	1.315	1.283
27–52	1.380	1.293	1.249	1.381	1.206	1.312	1.250	1.429	1.430	1.371	1.472	1.406	1.480	1.429	1.468	1.399	1.443	1.449	1.478	1.468	1.374	1.348	1.369	1.432	1.390	1.444
53–78	1.479	1.448	1.586	1.397	1.543	1.380	1.440	1.380	1.374	1.377	1.269	1.464	1.441	1.352	1.423	1.462	1.523	1.433	1.403	1.450	1.367	1.181	1.294	1.360	1.439	1.087
79–102	1.387	1.459	1.322	1.381	1.353	1.418	1.350	1.330	1.517	1.354	1.454	1.330	1.406	1.374	1.385	1.460	1.457	1.439	1.405	1.362	1.505	1.463	1.546	1.542	–	

Source: Audience measurement performed nationwide by Nielsen Korea.

Average TV viewership ratings
Ep.	Original broadcast date	Average audience share	
Ep.	Original broadcast date	Nielsen Korea	
Ep.	Original broadcast date	Nationwide	Seoul
1	June 17, 2024	7.2% (4th)	6.3% (2nd)
2	June 18, 2024	6.2% (5th)	5.4% (6th)
3	June 19, 2024	7.1% (3rd)	6.2% (2nd)
4	June 20, 2024	7.5% (2nd)	6.9% (2nd)
5	June 21, 2024	6.7% (6th)	5.7% (5th)
6	June 24, 2024	7.0% (4th)	6.1% (4th)
7	June 25, 2024	6.7% (4th)	5.8% (4th)
8	June 26, 2024	7.1% (3rd)	6.3% (2nd)
9	June 27, 2024	7.5% (3rd)	6.6% (2nd)
10	June 28, 2024	6.6% (5th)	5.7% (4th)
11	July 1, 2024	7.1% (4th)	6.5% (3rd)
12	July 2, 2024	7.9% (3rd)	6.6% (4th)
13	July 3, 2024	7.4% (3rd)	6.5% (3rd)
14	July 4, 2024	6.8% (4th)	6.2% (3rd)
15	July 5, 2024	7.2% (5th)	6.3% (4th)
16	July 8, 2024	8.5% (3rd)	7.8% (2nd)
17	July 9, 2024	8.0% (3rd)	6.8% (2nd)
18	July 10, 2024	7.5% (5th)	6.7% (3rd)
19	July 11, 2024	6.8% (4th)	6.0% (3rd)
20	July 12, 2024	7.6% (4th)	7.1% (3rd)
21	July 15, 2024	7.7% (4th)	7.2% (3rd)
22	July 16, 2024	8.4% (3rd)	7.1% (2nd)
23	July 17, 2024	8.0% (2nd)	7.3% (2nd)
24	July 18, 2024	7.6% (3rd)	6.8% (3rd)
25	July 19, 2024	7.6% (5th)	6.3% (6th)
26	July 22, 2024	8.2% (3rd)	7.4% (3rd)
27	July 23, 2024	8.0% (2nd)	7.3% (2nd)
28	July 24, 2024	8.1% (2nd)	6.9% (2nd)
29	July 25, 2024	7.4% (3rd)	6.4% (3rd)
30	July 26, 2024	7.8% (3rd)	6.7% (4th)
31	August 12, 2024	7.6% (4th)	6.3% (5th)
32	August 13, 2024	8.1% (3rd)	7.2% (3rd)
33	August 14, 2024	7.7% (3rd)	6.6% (3rd)
34	August 15, 2024	8.2% (2nd)	7.4% (2nd)
35	August 16, 2024	8.1% (3rd)	6.3% (4th)
36	August 19, 2024	8.2% (4th)	6.8% (3rd)
37	August 20, 2024	8.7% (4th)	7.1% (4th)
38	August 21, 2024	8.5% (4th)	7.2% (4th)
39	August 22, 2024	8.5% (3rd)	6.7% (4th)
40	August 23, 2024	8.3% (3rd)	7.0% (4th)
41	August 26, 2024	8.9% (2nd)	8.0% (2nd)
42	August 27, 2024	8.0% (3rd)	6.9% (3rd)
43	August 28, 2024	8.8% (3rd)	7.6% (2nd)
44	August 29, 2024	8.7% (3rd)	7.4% (3rd)
45	August 30, 2024	8.9% (2nd)	7.5% (6th)
46	September 2, 2024	8.9% (2nd)	7.8% (2nd)
47	September 3, 2024	8.6% (2nd)	7.8% (2nd)
48	September 4, 2024	8.3% (2nd)	7.4% (2nd)
49	September 5, 2024	8.2% (4th)	7.0% (3rd)
50	September 6, 2024	8.6% (3rd)	7.3% (4th)
51	September 9, 2024	8.3% (3rd)	7.2% (2nd)
52	September 10, 2024	8.5% (3rd)	7.2% (4th)
53	September 11, 2024	8.9% (2nd)	7.7% (2nd)
54	September 12, 2024	8.7% (3rd)	7.7% (2nd)
55	September 13, 2024	9.4% (3rd)	8.6% (3rd)
56	September 19, 2024	8.3% (3rd)	6.6% (3rd)
57	September 20, 2024	8.8% (3rd)	7.5% (4th)
58	September 23, 2024	8.4% (2nd)	6.9% (3rd)
59	September 24, 2024	8.8% (2nd)	7.0% (3rd)
60	September 25, 2024	8.3% (3rd)	7.3% (3rd)
61	September 26, 2024	8.3% (2nd)	6.9% (3rd)
62	September 27, 2024	8.7% (2nd)	7.2% (4th)
63	September 30, 2024	8.1% (4th)	6.9% (4th)
64	October 1, 2024	8.8% (2nd)	7.6% (2nd)
65	October 3, 2024	8.8% (2nd)	7.5% (2nd)
66	October 4, 2024	8.4% (5th)	7.4% (4th)
67	October 7, 2024	8.7% (2nd)	7.6% (2nd)
68	October 9, 2024	8.7% (2nd)	7.3% (3rd)
69	October 10, 2024	9.6% (3rd)	8.0% (3rd)
70	October 11, 2024	8.8% (3rd)	7.6% (4th)
71	October 14, 2024	8.8% (2nd)	7.6% (2nd)
72	October 16, 2024	9.0% (2nd)	7.5% (2nd)
73	October 17, 2024	8.4% (2nd)	7.4% (3rd)
74	October 18, 2024	7.6% (3rd)	5.9% (6th)
75	October 21, 2024	7.9% (4th)	6.4% (5th)
76	October 22, 2024	8.7% (2nd)	7.2% (3rd)
77	October 24, 2024	8.8% (2nd)	7.4% (2nd)
78	October 25, 2024	7.1% (5th)	5.8% (9th)
79	October 29, 2024	8.8% (2nd)	7.1% (2nd)
80	October 30, 2024	9.1% (2nd)	7.9% (2nd)
81	October 31, 2024	8.2% (2nd)	6.7% (3rd)
82	November 1, 2024	8.6% (4th)	7.6% (3rd)
83	November 4, 2024	8.3% (2nd)	6.9% (4th)
84	November 5, 2024	8.4% (2nd)	6.6% (3rd)
85	November 6, 2024	8.7% (2nd)	7.3% (2nd)
86	November 7, 2024	8.0% (2nd)	6.8% (3rd)
87	November 8, 2024	9.4% (3rd)	7.8% (3rd)
88	November 11, 2024	8.9% (2nd)	8.2% (2nd)
89	November 12, 2024	8.7% (2nd)	7.2% (3rd)
90	November 13, 2024	8.6% (2nd)	7.5% (2nd)
91	November 14, 2024	9.2% (3rd)	7.7% (3rd)
92	November 15, 2024	9.0% (4th)	7.4% (5th)
93	November 18, 2024	8.9% (2nd)	7.6% (2nd)
94	November 19, 2024	8.9% (3rd)	7.2% (3rd)
95	November 20, 2024	8.4% (2nd)	7.4% (2nd)
96	November 21, 2024	8.9% (2nd)	7.6% (2nd)
97	November 22, 2024	8.8% (3rd)	7.4% (4th)
98	November 25, 2024	8.8% (2nd)	7.5% (3rd)
99	November 26, 2024	9.1% (2nd)	7.4% (3rd)
100	November 27, 2024	8.9% (2nd)	7.7% (3rd)
101	November 28, 2024	9.6% (2nd)	8.2% (2nd)
102	November 29, 2024	9.5% (3rd)	7.9% (3rd)
Average		8.3%	7.1%
In the table above, the blue numbers represent the lowest ratings and the red numbers represent the highest ratings.
