= Iron Family =

2024–2025 South Korean television series

- Promotional poster
- Hangul: 다리미 패밀리
- RR: Darimi paemilli
- MR: Tarimi p'aemilli
- Genre: Black comedy; Romantic; Family
- Written by: Seo Sook-hyang
- Directed by: Seong Jun-hae; Seo Yong-soo
- Starring: Kim Jung-hyun; Keum Sae-rok; Choi Tae-joon; Yang Hye-ji
- Music by: Choi In-hee
- Opening theme: "Ironing Family" by: Choi In-hee; Oh Hye-joo
- Country of origin: South Korea
- Original language: Korean
- No. of episodes: 36

Production
- Executive producer: Kim Hyung-seok
- Producers: Han Sang-woo; Kim Chang-min; Park Sung-hye; Jo Ji-hoon
- Running time: 70 minutes
- Production companies: KeyEast; Monster Union; Iron Family SPC
- Budget: ₩13 billion

Original release
- Network: KBS2
- Release: September 28, 2024 – January 26, 2025

Iron Family (Korean: 다리미 패밀리) is a 2024–2025 South Korean television series starring Kim Jung-hyun, Keum Sae-rok, Choi Tae-joon, and Yang Hye-ji. It aired on KBS2 from September 28, 2024, to January 26, 2025, every Saturday and Sunday at 19:55 (KST).

== Synopsis ==
Iron Family follows the story of Da-rim's family, who secretly stashed away ten million dollars they found at Mount Euak. However, the money belongs to Gang-ju's mother, who's been searching for it. As the story unfolds, Da-rim and Gang-ju fall in love and become a couple.

== Cast ==
=== Main ===
- Kim Jung-hyun as Seo Gang-ju

An executive director of Jiseung Group.

- Keum Sae-rok as Lee Da-rim

The youngest daughter of a laundry shop who is visually impaired.

- Choi Tae-joon as Cha Tae-woong

A part-time worker at a clean laundry shop who becomes a part of Da-rim's family.

- Yang Hye-ji as Lee Cha-rim

The second daughter of a clean laundry shop.

=== Supporting ===
==== People around Gang-ju ====
- Shin Hyun-joon as Ji Seung-don

The chairman of Jiseung Group who is Ji-yeon's husband and Gang-ju's stepfather.

- Kim Hye-eun as Baek Ji-yeon

Gang-ju's mother and Seung-don's wife.

==== People around Da-rim and Cha-rim ====
- Park Ji-young as Go Bong-hee

A mother who runs a dry cleaning laundry shop.

- Kim Young-ok as Ahn Gil-rye

Bong-hee's mother in-law and Da-rim's grandmother.

- Park In-hwan as Lee Man-deuk

Gil-rye's husband.

- Wang Ji-hye as Lee Mi-yeon

The daughter of Gil-rye and Man-deuk and the aunt of the three siblings of the Clean Laundry.

- Kim Hyun-joon as Lee Moo-rim

The eldest son of the Clean Laundry and the Cheongryeom Police Station sergeant.

==== People around Ki-dong ====
- Jo Bok-rae as Nam Ki-dong

A restaurant owner and widower.

- Byun Yoon-jung as Bok Mi-kyung

A person who runs Cheongryeom Real Estate.

- Oh Young-sil as Bae Hae-ja

Ki-dong's mother in-law.

==== People around Soo-ji ====
- Ha Seo-yoon as Song Soo-ji

Mi-ok's daughter and Moo-rim's fiancé.

- Kim Sun-kyung as Yoon Mi-ok

Soo-ji's mother and the chief of the Cheongryeom Police Station.

- Lee Sung-yeol as Choi Hyung-cheol

An inspector and Soo-ji's partner.

==== Other ====
- Kang Deok-joong as Ji Seung-don's chauffeur.

== Production ==
=== Development ===
The series was written by Seo Sook-hyang, co-directed by Seong Jun-hae and Seo Yong-soo, and produced by KeyEast and Monster Union.

In June 2024, the series was reportedly to reduced the number of episodes from producing 50 episodes to 36.

== Viewership ==
Iron Family : South Korea viewers per episode (millions)

Episodes	Episode number																	
Episodes	1	2	3	4	5	6	7	8	9	10	11	12	13	14	15	16	17	18
1–18	2.393	2.504	2.325	2.644	2.490	2.803	2.505	2.829	2.416	2.999	2.567	2.925	2.614	2.878	2.761	3.046	2.524	3.017
19–36	2.775	2.916	2.489	2.887	2.580	2.872	2.629	3.148	2.599	2.720	3.222	3.511	3.270	3.565	3.108	3.484	3.364	3.709

Source: Audience measurement performed nationwide by Nielsen Korea.

Average TV viewership ratings
Ep.	Original broadcast date	Average audience share (Nielsen Korea)	
Ep.	Original broadcast date	Nationwide	Seoul
1	September 28, 2024	14.1% (1st)	12.6% (1st)
2	September 29, 2024	14.5% (2nd)	12.8% (2nd)
3	October 5, 2024	14.4% (1st)	12.3% (2nd)
4	October 6, 2024	15.4% (1st)	14.3% (1st)
5	October 12, 2024	14.7% (1st)	13.5% (2nd)
6	October 13, 2024	16.0% (1st)	15.1% (1st)
7	October 19, 2024	15.3% (1st)	13.3% (1st)
8	October 20, 2024	16.2% (1st)	15.0% (1st)
9	October 26, 2024	14.6% (1st)	13.5% (1st)
10	October 27, 2024	17.6% (1st)	16.5% (1st)
11	November 2, 2024	15.2% (1st)	13.1% (1st)
12	November 3, 2024	17.1% (1st)	16.3% (1st)
13	November 9, 2024	15.1% (1st)	14.2% (1st)
14	November 10, 2024	16.7% (1st)	15.1% (1st)
15	November 16, 2024	16.1% (1st)	14.7% (1st)
16	November 17, 2024	17.8% (1st)	16.3% (1st)
17	November 23, 2024	15.6% (1st)	14.4% (1st)
18	November 24, 2024	17.2% (1st)	15.6% (1st)
19	November 30, 2024	16.2% (1st)	14.7% (1st)
20	December 1, 2024	17.1% (1st)	15.7% (1st)
21	December 7, 2024	14.1% (1st)	13.4% (1st)
22	December 8, 2024	16.2% (1st)	15.2% (1st)
23	December 14, 2024	14.5% (1st)	12.8% (1st)
24	December 15, 2024	16.8% (1st)	16.0% (1st)
25	December 21, 2024	16.0% (1st)	14.4% (1st)
26	December 22, 2024	17.2% (1st)	15.9% (1st)
27	December 28, 2024	15.4% (1st)	13.8% (1st)
28	December 29, 2024	15.6% (1st)	14.1% (1st)
29	January 4, 2025	17.4% (1st)	16.1% (1st)
30	January 5, 2025	18.9% (1st)	18.2% (1st)
31	January 11, 2025	17.8% (1st)	16.4% (1st)
32	January 12, 2025	19.6% (1st)	18.5% (1st)
33	January 18, 2025	17.4% (1st)	16.4% (1st)
34	January 19, 2025	19.0% (1st)	17.6% (1st)
35	January 25, 2025	18.3% (1st)	16.4% (1st)
36	January 26, 2025	19.7% (1st)	18.2% (1st)
Average		16.4%	15.1%
In the table above, the blue numbers represent the lowest ratings and the red numbers represent the highest ratings.
