= Face Me =

2024 South Korean television series

- Promotional poster
- Hangul: 페이스 미
- RR: Peiseu mi
- MR: P'eisŭ mi
- Genre: Medical drama; Melodrama; Mystery; Thriller
- Written by: Hwang Ye-jin
- Directed by: Jo Rok-hwan
- Starring: Lee Min-ki; Han Ji-hyun; Lee Yi-kyung; Jeon Bae-soo
- Music by: Won Ho-kyung
- Country of origin: South Korea
- Original language: Korean
- No. of episodes: 12

Production
- Running time: 65 minutes
- Production company: Westworld Story

Original release
- Network: KBS2
- Release: November 6 – December 12, 2024

Face Me (Korean: 페이스 미) is a 2024 South Korean medical drama television series starring Lee Min-ki, Han Ji-hyun, Lee Yi-kyung, and Jeon Bae-soo. It aired on KBS2 from November 6, to December 12, 2024, every Wednesday and Thursday at 21:50 (KST). It is also available for streaming on Viki in selected regions.

== Cast and characters ==
- Lee Min-ki as Cha Jung-woo

- Han Ji-hyun as Lee Min-hyung

- Lee Yi-kyung as Han Woo-jin

Jung-woo's childhood friend.

- Jeon Bae-soo as Kim Seok-hoon

Jung-woo's warm mentor.

- Ha Young as Yoon Hye-jin

A dancer, Jeong-woo's ex-girlfriend.

- Kang Da-hyun as Park Chae-gyeong

A lawyer.

== Production ==
=== Development ===
Director Jo Rok-hwan, who directed Voice 2 (2018), and writer Hwang Ye-jin, who wrote Secret Mother (2018), are teaming up.

=== Casting ===
According to Star News on February 3, 2023, Han Ji-hyun had been confirmed to appear in the series.

On September 26, 2024, it was reported that Lee Min-ki, Han, Lee Yi-kyung, and Jeon Bae-soo are teaming up for the series.

=== Filming ===
Principal photography begin in March 2023. It was originally set to began filming in February 2023.

== Viewership ==
Face Me : South Korea viewers per episode (thousands)

Season	Episode number											
Season	1	2	3	4	5	6	7	8	9	10	11	12
1	587	563	416	529	N/A	561	N/A	522	N/A	N/A	454	N/A

Source: Audience measurement performed nationwide by Nielsen Korea.

Average TV viewership ratings
Ep.	Original broadcast date	Average audience share (Nielsen Korea)	
Ep.	Original broadcast date	Nationwide	Seoul
1	November 6, 2024	3.3% (16th)	3.2% (16th)
2	November 7, 2024	3.1% (18th)	N/A
3	November 13, 2024	2.3% (25th)	N/A
4	November 14, 2024	3.1% (19th)	2.9% (19th)
5	November 20, 2024	2.0% (26th)	N/A
6	November 21, 2024	3.2% (17th)	3.0% (18th)
7	November 27, 2024	2.5% (23rd)	N/A
8	November 28, 2024	3.2% (19th)	3.3% (18th)
9	December 4, 2024	2.8% (23rd)	N/A
10	December 5, 2024	2.9% (22nd)	N/A
11	December 11, 2024	2.6% (20th)	N/A
12	December 12, 2024	2.9% (22nd)	2.8% (20th)
Average		2.8%	— (Note: Due to multiple unpublished ratings, the exact average rating is unknown.)
In the table above, the blue numbers represent the lowest ratings and the red numbers represent the highest ratings.; N/A denotes ratings that were not published.
