= My Merry Marriage =

2024 South Korean television series

- Promotional poster
- Hangul: 결혼하자 맹꽁아!
- Lit.: Let's Get Married, You Silly Goose!
- RR: Gyeolhonhaja maengkkonga!
- MR: Kyŏrhonhaja maengkkonga!
- Genre: Family; Romantic comedy
- Written by: Song Jung-rim
- Directed by: Kim Sung-geun
- Starring: Park Ha-na; Park Sang-nam; Kim Sa-kwon; Lee Yeon-doo; Park Tam-hee; Lee Eun-hyung
- Music by: Lee Chang-hee
- Country of origin: South Korea
- Original language: Korean
- No. of episodes: 125 + 3 Special

Production
- Executive producer: Park Young-joo
- Producers: Jeong Gwang-su; Bae Seong-su; Kim Dong-gu
- Running time: 30 minutes
- Production companies: DK E&M; Monster Union

Original release
- Network: KBS1
- Release: October 7, 2024 – April 8, 2025

My Merry Marriage (Korean: 결혼하자 맹꽁아!) is a 2024–2025 South Korean television series starring Park Ha-na, Park Sang-nam, Kim Sa-kwon, Lee Yeon-doo, Park Tam-hee, and Lee Eun-hyung. It aired on KBS1 from October 7, 2024, to April 8, 2025, every Monday to Friday at 20:30 (KST).

== Cast ==
=== Main ===
- Park Ha-na as Maeng Gong-hee, a contract designer at Jayce Fashion.
- Park Sang-nam as Goo Dan-soo, Fashion chairman's grandson.
- Kim Sa-kwon as Seo Min-ki, Jayce Fashion's head of the marketing team.
- Lee Yeon-doo as Kang Ji-na
- Park Tam-hee as Eom Hong-dan
- Lee Eun-hyung as Maeng Gong-bu

=== Supporting ===
==== People around Gong-hee and Gong-bu ====
- Yang Mi-kyung as Kang Myung-ja, Gong-hee and Gong-bu's mother.
- Choi Jae-sung as Maeng Kyung-tae, Gong-hee and Gong-bu's father.
- Ban Hyo-jung as Im Soon-yi, Myung-ja's biological mother.
- Yoon Bok-in as Maeng Gyeong-bok, Kyung-tae's younger sister.

==== Others ====
- Yang Hee-kyung as Hwang Ik-seon, president of Jayce Fashion and the grandmother of Dan-soo.
- Jeon Soo-kyeong as Jeong Joo-ri, Min-ki's mother.
- Choi Su-rin as Audrey

=== Special appearances ===
- Kim Hyuk
- Kim Jun-bae

== Production ==
The KBS1 family drama My Merry Marriage was written by Song Jung-rim, directed by Kim Sung-geun, and produced by DK E&M and Monster Union.

On August 27, 2024, Park Ha-na, Park Sang-nam, Kim Sa-kwon, Lee Yeon-doo, Park Tam-hee, and Lee Eun-hyung had confirmed their appearances for the series.

== Viewership ==
My Merry Marriage : South Korea viewers per episode (millions)

Episodes	Episode number																								
Episodes	1	2	3	4	5	6	7	8	9	10	11	12	13	14	15	16	17	18	19	20	21	22	23	24	25
1–25	2.135	1.838	1.952	2.044	1.693	1.907	1.555	1.838	1.873	1.667	1.722	1.874	1.778	2.034	1.590	1.679	1.822	1.756	1.835	1.872	2.007	1.898	1.840	1.908	1.757
26–50	1.988	1.888	1.807	2.072	1.859	1.960	1.861	1.901	1.879	1.792	1.925	1.931	1.854	1.971	1.867	2.049	2.037	1.720	1.737	1.891	1.933	1.650	1.953	1.944	1.981
51–75	2.038	1.962	2.164	1.860	2.079	2.254	1.964	1.937	1.910	2.275	2.394	2.393	2.505	2.361	2.397	2.461	2.382	2.458	2.343	2.600	2.351	2.496	2.294	2.286	2.557
76–100	2.386	2.360	1.881	1.886	2.428	2.427	2.585	2.476	2.433	2.539	2.596	2.404	2.249	2.388	2.265	2.368	2.560	2.398	2.471	2.718	2.372	2.500	2.441	2.412	2.474
101–125	2.506	2.812	2.598	2.668	2.632	2.542	2.491	2.494	2.540	2.635	2.395	2.595	2.238	2.342	2.433	2.549	2.484	2.233	2.397	2.576	2.443	2.419	2.423	2.474	2.349

Source: Audience measurement performed nationwide by Nielsen Korea.

Average TV viewership ratings
Ep.	Original broadcast date	Average audience share	
Ep.	Original broadcast date	Nielsen Korea	
Ep.	Original broadcast date	Nationwide	Seoul
1	October 7, 2024	13.2% (1st)	11.6% (1st)
2	October 8, 2024	11.1% (1st)	9.6% (1st)
3	October 9, 2024	11.1% (1st)	9.5% (1st)
4	October 10, 2024	12.6% (1st)	11.0% (2nd)
5	October 11, 2024	10.3% (2nd)	9.0% (2nd)
6	October 14, 2024	11.4% (1st)	10.1% (1st)
7	October 15, 2024	8.9% (2nd)	7.8% (2nd)
8	October 16, 2024	11.8% (1st)	10.3% (1st)
9	October 17, 2024	11.8% (1st)	10.3% (1st)
10	October 18, 2024	10.7% (2nd)	8.8% (2nd)
11	October 21, 2024	10.7% (1st)	9.5% (1st)
12	October 22, 2024	10.2% (1st)	10.3% (1st)
13	October 23, 2024	10.6% (1st)	9.4% (1st)
14	October 24, 2024	12.2% (1st)	10.1% (1st)
15	October 25, 2024	10.3% (2nd)	8.4% (2nd)
16	October 28, 2024	10.8% (2nd)	9.0% (2nd)
17	October 29, 2024	11.5% (1st)	10.0% (1st)
18	October 30, 2024	11.1% (1st)	9.9% (1st)
19	October 31, 2024	11.2% (1st)	9.6% (1st)
20	November 1, 2024	11.0% (2nd)	9.6% (2nd)
21	November 4, 2024	12.2% (1st)	10.9% (1st)
22	November 5, 2024	11.4% (1st)	9.9% (1st)
23	November 6, 2024	11.8% (1st)	10.3% (1st)
24	November 7, 2024	11.6% (1st)	9.9% (1st)
25	November 8, 2024	11.2% (2nd)	10.0% (2nd)
26	November 11, 2024	12.1% (1st)	10.2% (1st)
27	November 12, 2024	11.6% (1st)	9.9% (1st)
28	November 13, 2024	11.4% (1st)	9.7% (1st)
29	November 14, 2024	12.5% (1st)	11.4% (1st)
30	November 15, 2024	11.9% (1st)	10.3% (2nd)
31	November 18, 2024	12.0% (1st)	10.7% (1st)
32	November 19, 2024	11.3% (1st)	9.1% (2nd)
33	November 20, 2024	11.5% (1st)	10.0% (1st)
34	November 21, 2024	11.6% (1st)	9.8% (1st)
35	November 22, 2024	10.9% (2nd)	9.5% (2nd)
36	November 25, 2024	11.8% (1st)	10.5% (1st)
37	November 26, 2024	11.6% (1st)	9.9% (1st)
38	November 27, 2024	11.3% (1st)	9.6% (1st)
39	November 28, 2024	12.3% (1st)	10.7% (1st)
40	November 29, 2024	11.8% (1st)	10.0% (2nd)
41	December 2, 2024	12.6% (1st)	10.3% (1st)
42	December 3, 2024	12.3% (1st)	10.1% (1st)
43	December 4, 2024	10.5% (1st)	8.4% (1st)
44	December 5, 2024	11.0% (1st)	9.3% (2nd)
45	December 9, 2024	11.5% (1st)	9.8% (2nd)
46	December 10, 2024	11.7% (1st)	9.8% (2nd)
47	December 13, 2024	9.7% (3rd)	8.2% (3rd)
48	December 16, 2024	11.8% (1st)	9.6% (2nd)
49	December 17, 2024	11.7% (1st)	9.6% (1st)
50	December 18, 2024	12.0% (1st)	10.3% (1st)
51	December 19, 2024	12.5% (1st)	10.5% (1st)
52	December 20, 2024	11.9% (1st)	10.3% (2nd)
53	December 23, 2024	12.7% (1st)	11.1% (1st)
54	December 24, 2024	11.5% (1st)	10.0% (1st)
55	December 25, 2024	12.5% (1st)	10.3% (2nd)
56	December 26, 2024	13.2% (1st)	11.4% (1st)
57	December 27, 2024	11.9% (1st)	10.4% (2nd)
58	December 30, 2024	11.7% (1st)	9.7% (1st)
59	December 31, 2024	11.4% (1st)	9.8% (1st)
60	January 1, 2024	12.8% (1st)	11.4% (1st)
61	January 2, 2024	13.2% (1st)	11.7% (1st)
62	January 3, 2024	13.3% (1st)	12.2% (1st)
63	January 6, 2025	13.7% (1st)	12.3% (1st)
64	January 7, 2025	13.3% (1st)	11.8% (1st)
65	January 8, 2025	13.5% (1st)	11.8% (1st)
66	January 9, 2025	13.5% (1st)	11.7% (1st)
67	January 10, 2025	13.2% (1st)	12.0% (1st)
68	January 13, 2025	14.0% (1st)	12.4% (1st)
69	January 14, 2025	13.3% (1st)	12.2% (1st)
70	January 16, 2025	14.6% (1st)	13.3% (1st)
71	January 17, 2025	13.6% (1st)	12.4% (1st)
72	January 20, 2025	14.4% (1st)	12.5% (1st)
73	January 21, 2025	13.4% (1st)	12.2% (1st)
74	January 22, 2025	13.3% (1st)	12.4% (1st)
75	January 23, 2025	14.7% (1st)	13.3% (1st)
76	January 24, 2025	13.8% (1st)	12.5% (1st)
77	January 27, 2025	13.1% (1st)	11.6% (1st)
78	January 28, 2025	9.9% (1st)	8.5% (1st)
79	January 29, 2025	9.6% (1st)	8.4% (1st)
80	January 30, 2025	13.4% (1st)	12.5% (1st)
81	January 31, 2025	13.9% (1st)	13.0% (1st)
82	February 3, 2025	14.6% (1st)	12.4% (1st)
83	February 4, 2025	13.9% (1st)	12.0% (1st)
84	February 5, 2025	13.9% (1st)	12.6% (1st)
85	February 6, 2025	14.7% (1st)	12.9% (1st)
86	February 7, 2025	14.5% (1st)	12.9% (1st)
87	February 10, 2025	13.7% (1st)	11.3% (1st)
88	February 11, 2025	13.1% (1st)	10.8% (1st)
89	February 12, 2025	13.2% (1st)	11.5% (1st)
90	February 13, 2025	13.4% (1st)	11.4% (1st)
91	February 14, 2025	13.7% (1st)	11.5% (1st)
92	February 17, 2025	14.4% (1st)	12.2% (1st)
93	February 18, 2025	13.7% (1st)	12.0% (1st)
94	February 19, 2025	14.1% (1st)	12.3% (1st)
95	February 20, 2025	15.1% (1st)	13.1% (1st)
96	February 21, 2025	13.6% (1st)	12.0% (1st)
97	February 24, 2025	14.2% (1st)	12.3% (1st)
98	February 25, 2025	14.1% (1st)	11.8% (1st)
99	February 26, 2025	13.9% (1st)	11.9% (1st)
100	February 27, 2025	14.4% (1st)	12.4% (1st)
101	February 28, 2025	14.4% (1st)	12.1% (1st)
102	March 3, 2025	16.0% (1st)	14.2% (1st)
103	March 4, 2025	14.8% (1st)	13.0% (1st)
104	March 5, 2025	15.1% (1st)	13.3% (1st)
105	March 6, 2025	15.0% (1st)	13.6% (1st)
106	March 7, 2025	14.6% (1st)	12.4% (1st)
107	March 10, 2025	14.5% (1st)	12.4% (1st)
108	March 11, 2025	14.3% (1st)	12.6% (1st)
109	March 12, 2025	14.4% (1st)	12.8% (1st)
110	March 13, 2025	14.7% (1st)	12.8% (1st)
111	March 14, 2025	13.6% (1st)	12.0% (1st)
112	March 17, 2025	14.3% (1st)	12.4% (1st)
113	March 18, 2025	12.7% (1st)	10.9% (1st)
114	March 19, 2025	13.4% (1st)	11.1% (1st)
115	March 20, 2025	13.7% (1st)	12.4% (1st)
116	March 21, 2025	14.3% (1st)	12.7% (1st)
117	March 24, 2025	14.3% (1st)	12.2% (1st)
118	March 25, 2025	12.9% (1st)	10.9% (2nd)
119	March 28, 2025	13.2% (1st)	11.1% (2nd)
120	March 31, 2025	14.3% (1st)	12.6% (1st)
121	April 1, 2025	13.9% (1st)	11.9% (1st)
122	April 2, 2025	13.7% (1st)	11.9% (1st)
123	April 3, 2025	13.6% (1st)	11.9% (1st)
124	April 7, 2025	14.1% (1st)	11.7% (1st)
125	April 8, 2025	13.4% (1st)	11.5% (1st)
Average		—	—
In the table above, the blue numbers represent the lowest ratings and the red numbers represent the highest ratings.
