= 2023 MBC Drama Awards =

42nd edition of award ceremony

- Official poster
- Date: December 30, 2023
- Site: MBC Media Center Public Hall, Sangam-dong, Mapo-gu, Seoul
- Hosted by: Kim Sung-joo; Park Gyu-young
- Official website: MBC Drama Awards

Highlights
- Grand Prize (Daesang): Namkoong Min
- Most awards: My Dearest (9)
- Most nominations: My Dearest (15)

Television coverage
- Network: MBC; Naver Now; YouTube
- Ratings: 5.1%

The 2023 MBC Drama Awards, presented by Munhwa Broadcasting Corporation (MBC) took place at MBC Media Center Public Hall in Sangam-dong, Mapo-gu, Seoul on December 30, 2023. Kim Sung-joo hosted the award ceremony fourth year in succession, along with Park Gyu-young, in her first hosting assignment since her debut. The award ceremony will be broadcast live on MBC, Naver Now and YouTube.

== Winners and nominees ==
Nominations for the best couple award were revealed on December 18, 2023.

Winners are listed first and denoted in bold.

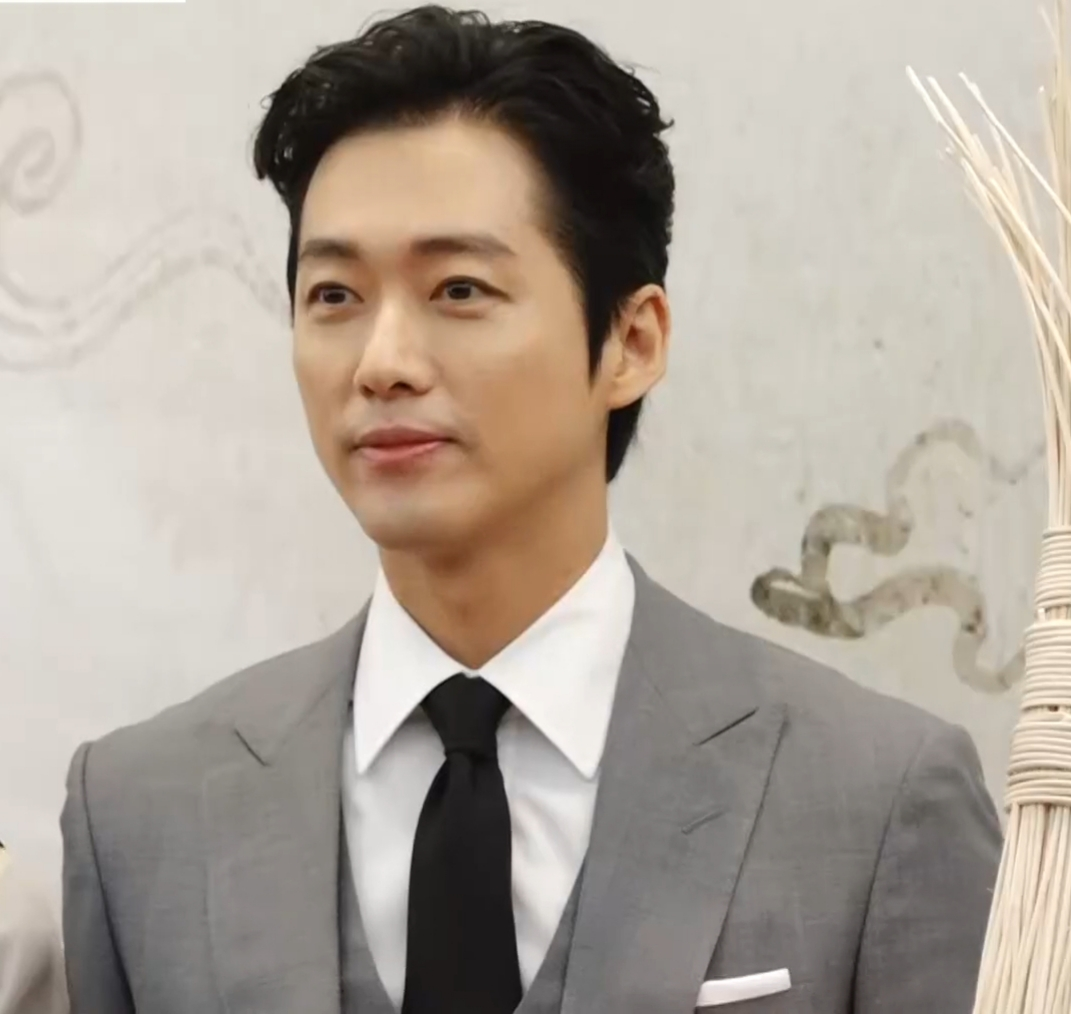
Namkoong Min, winner of Grand Prize (Daesang).

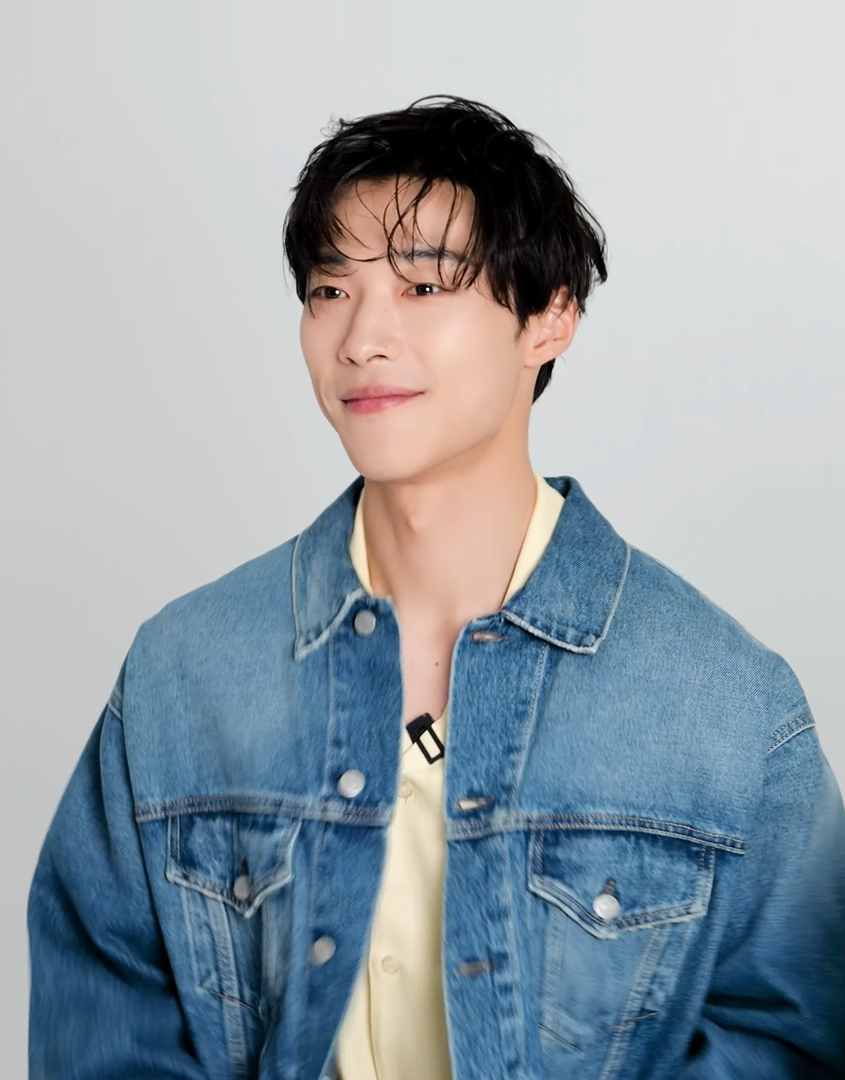
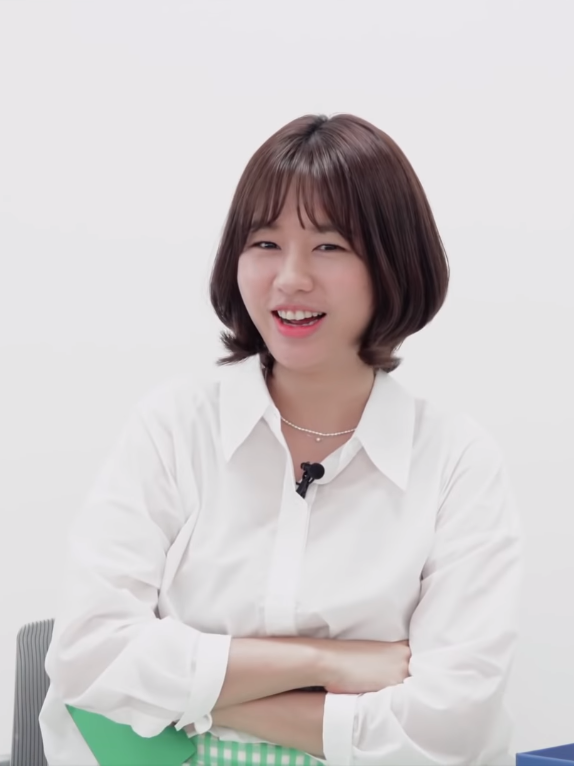
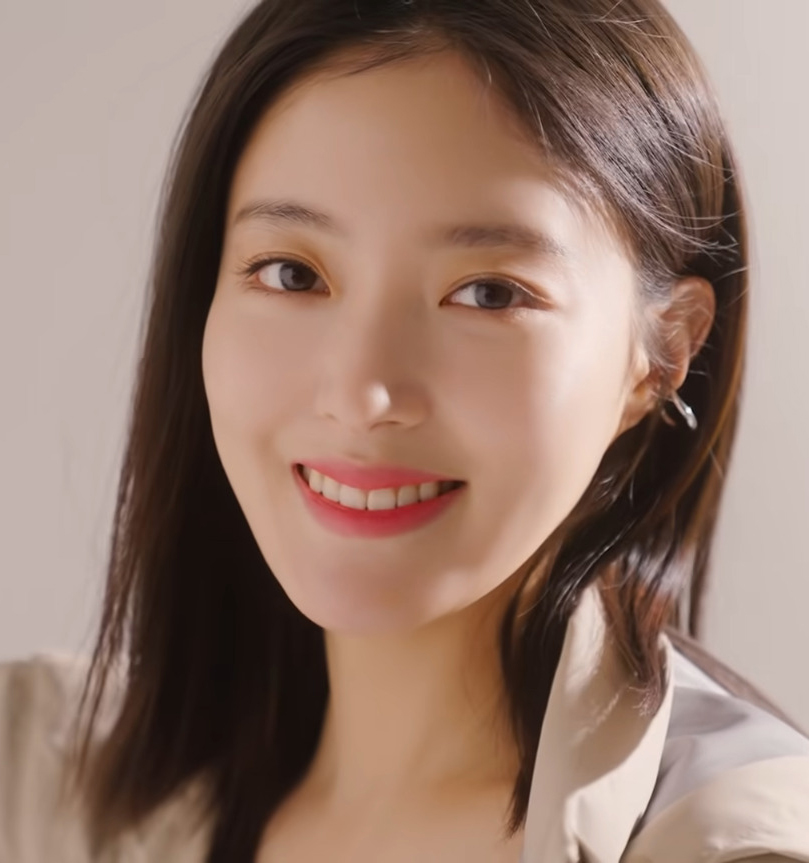
Woo Do-hwan (left), Ahn Eun-jin (middle), and Lee Se-young (right), winners of Top Excellence Award, Actor and Actresses in a Miniseries.
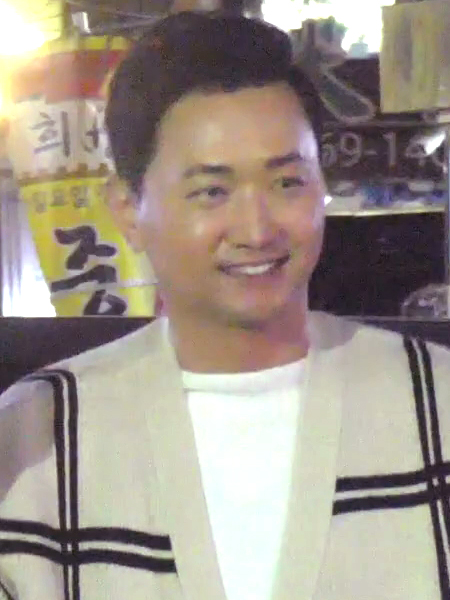
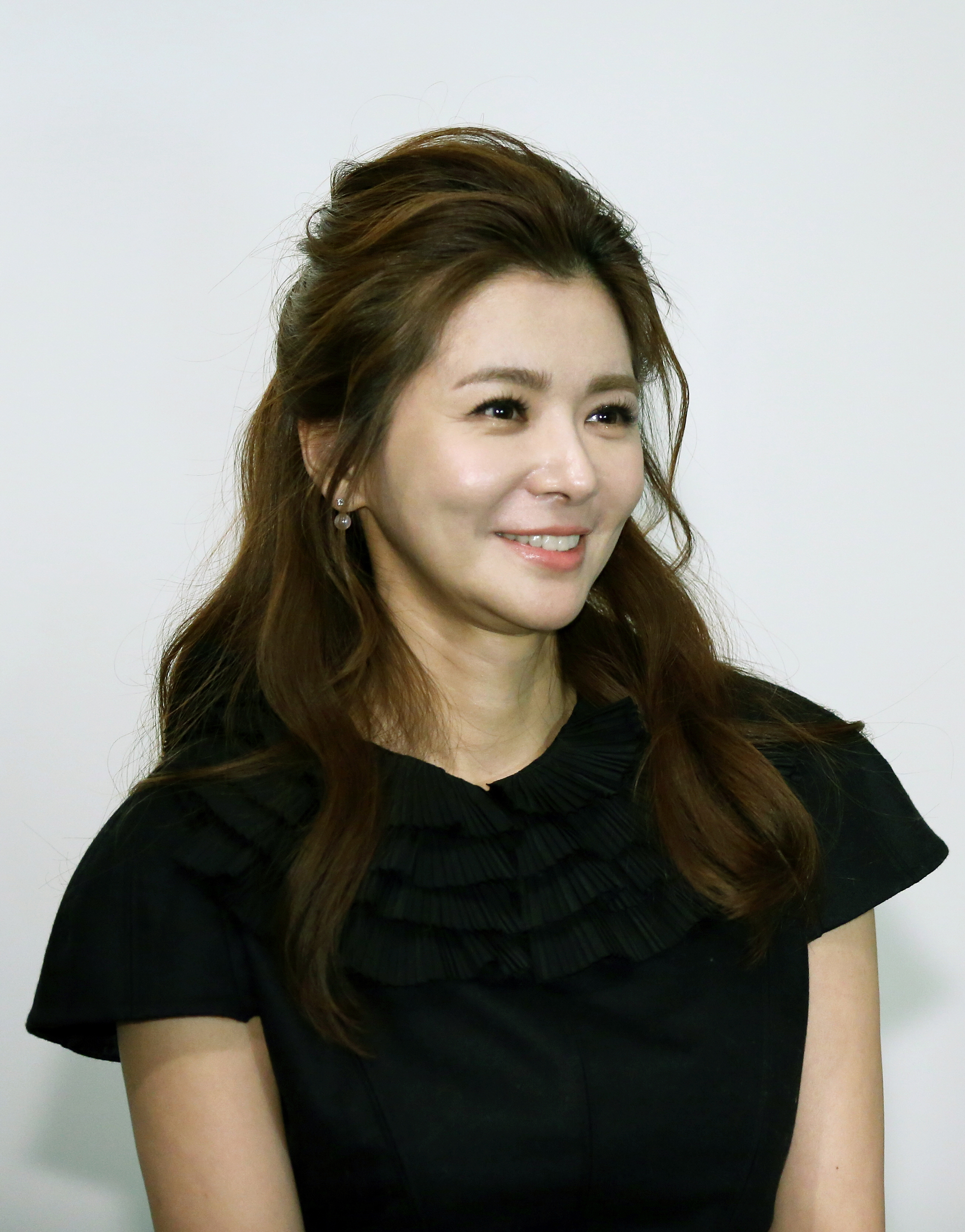
Kim Yoo-seok (left) and Jang Seo-hee (right), winners Top Excellence Award, Actor and Actress in a Daily Drama.

Grand Prize (Daesang)	Drama of the Year
**Namkoong Min – My Dearest**	**My Dearest**; Joseon Attorney; The Story of Park's Marriage Contract
Top Excellence Award, Actor in a Miniseries	Top Excellence Award, Actress in a Miniseries
**Woo Do-hwan – Joseon Attorney**; Cha Eun-woo – A Good Day to Be a Dog; Kim Myung-soo – Numbers; Namkoong Min – My Dearest	**Ahn Eun-jin – My Dearest**; **Lee Se-young – The Story of Park's Marriage Contract**; Im Soo-hyang – Kokdu: Season of Deity; Lee Chung-ah – My Dearest
Top Excellence Award, Actor in a Daily Drama	Top Excellence Award, Actress in a Daily Drama
**Kim Yu-seok – Meant to Be**; Byun Woo-min – Meant to Be; Oh Chang-seok – Game of Witches	**Jang Seo-hee – Game of Witches**; Jung Woo-yeon – Meant to Be; Ko Eun-mi – Meant to Be
Excellence Award, Actor in a Miniseries	Excellence Award, Actress in a Miniseries
**Bae In-hyuk – The Story of Park's Marriage Contract**; Cha Hak-yeon – Joseon Attorney; Lee Hak-joo – My Dearest; Lee Hyun-woo – A Good Day to Be a Dog	**Park Gyu-young – A Good Day to Be a Dog**; Kim Ji-yeon – Joseon Attorney; Lee Da-in – My Dearest; Yeonwoo – Numbers
Excellence Award, Actor in a Daily Drama	Excellence Award, Actress in a Daily Drama
**Lee Hyun-seok – Game of Witches**; Jin Ju-hyung – Meant to Be; Seo Han-gyeol – Meant to Be	**Jeon Hye-yeon – Meant to Be**; Han Ji-wan – Game of Witches; Kim Kyu-seon – Game of Witches
Best Supporting Actor	Best Supporting Actress
**Choi Young-woo – My Dearest**; Jo Bok-rae – The Story of Park's Marriage Contract; Lee Kyu-sung – Joseon Attorney; Park Kang-sub – My Dearest	**Cha Chung-hwa – Kokdu: Season of Deity**; Bae Hae-sun – Numbers; Jin Kyung – The Story of Park's Marriage Contract; Kwon So-hyun – My Dearest
Best New Actor	Best New Actress
**Kim Mu-jun – My Dearest**; **Kim Yoon-woo – My Dearest**; Yoo Seon-ho – The Story of Park's Marriage Contract; Yoon Hyun-soo – A Good Day to Be a Dog	**Joo Hyun-young – The Story of Park's Marriage Contract**; **Park Jung-yeon – My Dearest**; Do Yeon-jin – Numbers; Jeon Hye-won – My Dearest
Best Couple Award	Best Character Award
**Namkoong Min and Ahn Eun-jin – My Dearest**; Bae In-hyuk and Lee Se-young – The Story of Park's Marriage Contract; Cha Eun-woo and Park Gyu-young – A Good Day to Be a Dog; Woo Do-hwan and Kim Ji-yeon – Joseon Attorney	**Kim Jong-tae – My Dearest**; Choi Min-soo – Numbers; Choi Moo-sung – My Dearest; Chun Ho-jin – The Story of Park's Marriage Contract

== See also ==
- 2023 SBS Drama Awards
- 2023 KBS Drama Awards
