= Song Shi =

Song Shi may refer to:

- History of Song (book), a 14th-century Chinese history book on the Song dynasty
- Litigation master, a type of legal practitioner in traditional Chinese law
- Song poetry, Classical Chinese poetry from the Song dynasty
- Song Shi (skier) (born 1958), Chinese cross-country skier

== See also ==
- History of the Song dynasty (960–1276)
