= Attorneys in Japan =

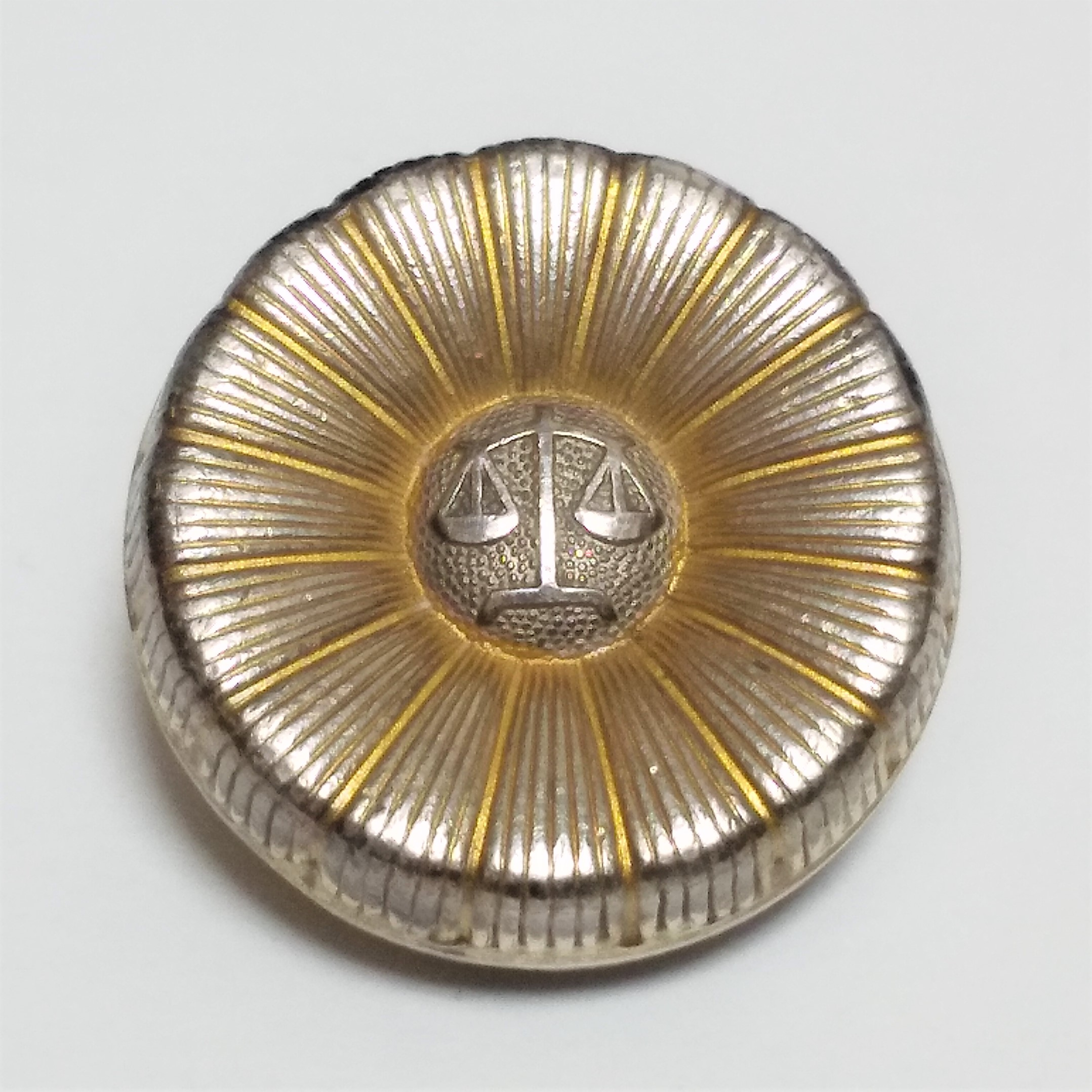
The sunflower lapel pin of qualified bengoshi

In Japan, attorneys at law (弁護士, bengoshi; lit. "advocate") form the base of the country's legal community.

== History ==
=== Pre-Meiji restoration ===
Historically, Japanese customs instituted an avoidance of legal involvement, based upon Confucian doctrines, and Japanese principles of harmony; anyone brought before a court for a criminal or civil matter suffered public and private humiliation, since they disrupted harmony.

Nevertheless, by the 18th century, innkeepers in Edo began offering simple legal services for guests. They were known as Kujishi. By the 19th century, references began to appear in Japanese literature on the role of "European-style" lawyers.

Officially recognized legal representatives in civil trials, known as daigennin, began to appear by the mid-19th century. No legal training was required to be a daigennin.

=== Meiji restoration ===
Regulation of legal professionals began during the Meiji Restoration. In 1890, the Criminal Code was amended, which recognized the right to legal representation during a criminal trial. The state's representative at the trial, known as a Procurator, was given the prestige of being a government official. By association, it unofficially granted a modicum of official status to the daigennin.

The government also required the establishment of bar associations at each district court, and by 1893, the Lawyer's Law was promulgated, officially regulating the legal profession by setting standards for, as well as legitimatizing, attorneys at law.

=== Post-World War II ===
The Attorney Act (弁護士法, bengoshihō) was promulgated in 1949, which officially laid down the mission of an attorney at law, as well as establishing other requirements for those in the profession.

== The legal industry ==
The legal profession in Japan (hōsō) comprises judges, prosecutors, and attorneys. In Japan, judges are not selected from experienced lawyers, but instead are selected after the one-year of mandatory "Legal Training Research Institute".

More than 100 universities have an undergraduate law faculty, which means that many people study law at the undergraduate level and go work for companies in a role that is unrelated to law.

As of August 2014, there are 35,031 attorneys registered with bar associations in Japan, which is up from 22,049 in April 2005.

Due to cultural traditions, Japanese have rarely used lawsuits as a means to settle disputes. With the rise of patent-disputes and international mergers, however, Japan is facing a shortage of lawyers, and the government has allowed universities to offer graduate courses on law, in order to ease the shortage. The push to produce lawyers has also been reflected in the demographics of the legal community, where 25.3% of the lawyers surveyed in 2008 had only been admitted to the bar for less than 5 years.

Starting salaries for Japanese attorneys are typically around 10 million yen (US$63,000) in established law firms, and about half as much in Japanese companies. In-house counsel are still relatively rare in Japan, with only 770 of the 32,000 registered bengoshi working in corporate law departments as of January 2013.

Foreign law firms have been permitted to hire Japanese attorneys since 2005, and such firms as Clifford Chance, Morrison & Foerster and White & Case have built large Japanese law practices that handle domestic matters for domestic clients. Some foreign firms that built bengoshi practices under this system, such as Linklaters and Allen & Overy, have since downsized or eliminated their bengoshi teams, while others such as Herbert Smith Freehills elected to rely on referral relationships with the Big Four law firms rather than competing with them by employing bengoshi within the firm.

== Qualification ==
With several minor exceptions, attorneys at law are required to pass a national bar examination (司法試験, shihō shiken; lit. "legal examination") followed by one year of internship, supervised by the Legal Research and Training Institute (司法研修所, Shihō Kenshūjo) of the Supreme Court of Japan.

Candidates who complete the qualification process are bengoshi, and are permitted to wear a lapel pin of a balance surrounded by a sunflower, respectively symbolizing justice/liberty (sunflower) and fairness/equality (balance).

There were 72 law schools as of July 2013 in Japan. Applications to law schools in Japan have been declining sharply, from approximately 70,000 applicants in 2004 to approximately 20,000 in 2015. This is due to the high tuition, difficulty of finding employment, and the increased enrollment in pre-examination.

The types of quasi-lawyers are patent agents (benrishi), tax agents (zerishi), judicial scriveners (shiho shoshi), and administrative scriveners (gyosei shoshi).

=== Bar examination ===
Before 2006, the bar examination consisted of three stages. The first stage, held in May, consisted of 60 multiple choice questions regarding constitutional law, civil law and criminal law. The second stage, held over two days in July, consisted of twelve essay questions regarding constitutional law, civil law, criminal law, commercial law, civil procedure law and criminal procedure law. The final stage, held in October, was an oral examination regarding constitutional law, civil law, criminal law, civil procedure law and criminal procedure law. Final results were published in mid-November. On average, 40,000–50,000 people took the first stage, 7,000–8,000 qualified for the second stage, and only 1,500 qualified for the oral examination each year.

In 2006, a new bar examination was instituted with only two stages. The first stage is a one-day short-answer examination concerning the six laws as well as administrative law. The second stage is a three-day essay examination concerning public law, civil law and criminal law, as well as subjects that can be selected by the examinee (including labor law, environmental law, public international law, and private international law). In addition, a law school requirement was introduced. All bar examination participants must complete a two or three-year graduate law program, and are limited to taking the examination within five years after graduation.

Those who have not graduated from law school may take the bar examination after passing a preliminary qualifying examination ("Yobi-Shiken"). But passing a preliminary exam is still a minor path and most people are from law school. In 2015, the pass rate for the pre-examination was 3%. This path allows to skip law school and thus avoid paying high tuition.

The Japanese Bar exam is known as one of the most difficult exams in the world. Although the bar pass rates are getting higher after the structural reform in 2006, only around 20% of the law school graduates pass the bar. Therefore, the top law schools in Japan are competing with each other by achieving higher bar pass rate. Students can attempt to pass the bar only five times, after which they are disqualified. Until 2013, they could attempt the bar examination only three times. Most students study at independent private schools in order to pass the bar examination, in addition to law school. The average age of those passing the bar examination is 28–29 years old.

=== Legal Training and Research Institute of Supreme Court ===
Those who have passed the bar examination participate in a one-year training process for studying practical skills (the skills for judges, prosecutors, and lawyers) in the LTRI. The training at the LTRI consists of (1) collective training (classes in the classroom); and (2) field training (e.g., apprentices to judges, prosecutors, law offices, etc.). The LTRI focuses on teaching the litigation skills. When the students pass the final examination (nikai shiken) at the LTRI, they become lawyers, prosecutors, or judges. Prosecutors and judges are handpicked by the LTRI.

== Bar association membership ==
In addition to passing the bar exam, an attorney must also be a member of the bar association (弁護士会, bengoshikai) for the prefecture where the law office is located. According to a 2008 survey by the Japanese Federation of Bar Associations (JFBA), 39.4% of all lawyers belong to the three Tokyo bar associations (Tokyo Bar Association, First Tokyo Bar Association, and Second Tokyo Bar Association).

=== Female attorneys ===
In 2024, there were 9,200 female attorneys in Japan, comprising about 20% of Japanese lawyers.

=== Membership for foreign attorneys ===
A total of 412 foreign-law attorneys were registered as of April 1, 2018.

Before World War II, attorneys qualified in foreign countries could join a Japanese bar with special permission from the Supreme Court. These individuals were referred to as quasi-members (準会員, junkaiin) of the bar. None remain in practice today.

The quasi-membership was abolished by judicial reforms in 1955, and was replaced by the attorney at foreign law (外国法事務弁護士, gaikokuhō jimu bengoshi) membership in 1986.

Attorneys in Okinawa who had been admitted as U.S. attorneys before the repatriation in 1972 were admitted as Japanese attorneys. They are classified by the Japanese Federation of Bar Associations (JFBA) as "Special members in Okinawa", and nine of them are still in practice as of August 2014.

=== Corporate membership ===
Large law firms have been organized in Tokyo, Osaka and other major cities, and have grown dramatically in recent years. Since 2002, these law firms can also join as members in their own right. They are classified by the JFBA as Legal Profession Corporation (弁護士法人, bengoshi hōjin), and there are 775 law firms who joined the bar in this capacity as of August 2014.

== See also ==
- List of law firms of Japan
- Judicial system of Japan
- Phoenix Wright
