= My Dearest =

2023 South Korean television series

- Promotional poster
- Hangul: 연인
- Hanja: 戀人
- Lit.: Lover
- RR: Yeonin
- MR: Yŏnin
- Genre: Historical drama; Melodrama; Romance
- Inspired by: Gone with the Wind by Margaret Mitchell
- Developed by: MBC
- Written by: Hwang Jin-young
- Directed by: Kim Seong-yong; Lee Han-jun; Cheon Soo-jin
- Starring: Namkoong Min; Ahn Eun-jin; Lee Hak-joo; Lee Da-in; Kim Yoon-woo; Lee Chung-ah
- Music by: Kim Soo-han
- Country of origin: South Korea
- Original language: Korean
- No. of episodes: 21

Production
- Executive producer: Hong Seok-woo (CP)
- Producers: Kim Jae-bok; Yoon Kwon-su; Kim Ji-ha
- Running time: 60–90 minutes
- Production companies: MBC; 9ato Entertainment

Original release
- Network: MBC TV
- Release: August 4 – November 18, 2023

My Dearest (Korean: 연인) is a 2023 South Korean television series starring Namkoong Min, Ahn Eun-jin, Lee Hak-joo, Lee Da-in, Kim Yoon-woo, and Lee Chung-ah. According to writer Hwang Jin-young, it is inspired by the 1936 novel Gone with the Wind. It aired on MBC TV from August 4 to November 18, 2023, every Friday and Saturday at 21:50 (KST). It is also available for streaming on Wavve in South Korea, and on Viki in selected regions.

The series was divided into two parts: Part 1 aired from August 4 to September 2, 2023, for ten episodes, while Part 2 aired from October 13 to November 18, 2023, for eleven episodes.

== Synopsis ==
Set during the Qing invasion of Joseon in the 1630s, the series follows the love story of Lee Jang-hyun, an enigmatic nobleman, and Yoo Gil-chae, the daughter of a noble family, whose lives are upended by the war.

== Cast ==
=== Main ===
- Namkoong Min as Lee Jang-hyun: an enigmatic nobleman who does not give his sincerity to anything, but after getting to know a woman, he opens the door to his unexpected fate.
  - Moon Seong-hyun as young Lee Jang-hyun
- Ahn Eun-jin as Yoo Gil-chae: the daughter of a noble family who gets entangled with Jang-hyun.
- Lee Hak-joo as Nam Yeon-joon: a promising Confucian student at Sungkyunkwan.
- Lee Da-in as Kyung Eun-ae: Yeon-joon's fiancée and Gil-chae's closest friend.
- Kim Yoon-woo as Ryang-eum: Jang-hyun's close friend who is the best pansori singer in Joseon.
- Lee Chung-ah as Gak-hwa: Hong Taiji's daughter and princess of Qing dynasty.

=== Supporting ===
==== People around Gil-chae ====
- Ji Seung-hyun as Gu Won-moo: a military officer.
- Park Jung-yeon as Jong Jong-yi: Gil-chae's maid.
- Kwon So-hyun as Bang Du-ne: Eun-ae's maid.

==== People around Jang-hyun ====
- Park Kang-seop as Gu-jam: Jang-hyun's servant.
- Choi Moo-sung as Yang-cheon: a gangster.

==== Joseon royal family and subjects ====
- Kim Jong-tae as King Injo: the sixteenth ruler of Joseon.
- Kim Mu-jun as Crown Prince Sohyeon: King Injo's eldest son.
- Jeon Hye-won as Crown Princess Kang: Crown Prince Sohyeon's wife.
- So Yoo-jin as Royal Consort So-yong Jo: King Injo's favorite concubine.
- Yang Hyun-min as Pyo Eon-gyeom: Crown Prince Sohyeon's loyal eunuch.
- Kim Tae-hoon as Choe Myeong-gil: a pragmatist who does not bend his decisions and prioritizes the national interests.
- Choi Jong-hwan as Kim Sang-heon: a loyal subject.
- Ha Kyung as Shin I-rip
- Jung Byung-cheol as Bong-si: King Injo's eunuch.

==== People from Qing dynasty ====
- Choi Young-woo as Yonggoldae: a military officer.
- Kim Jun-won as Hong Taiji: the emperor of Qing dynasty.
- Kang Gil-woo as Jung Myung-soo: an interpreter.

==== People in Neunggun-ri ====
- Oh Man-seok as Yoo Gyo-yeon: Gil-chae's father.
- Jo Seung-yeon as Kyung Geun-jik: Eun-ae's father.
- Park Jong-wook as Gong Sun-yak: the only son of the village head.
- Park Eun-woo as Yoo Young-chae: Gil-chae's younger sister.
- Jung Han-yong as Song-chu: a clerk at Neunggun-ri seowon.
- Nam Gi-ae as Yi-rang: Song-chu's wife.
- Park Jin-woo as Park Dae: Du-ne's husband and Gil-chae's helper.
- Jin Geon-woo as Dae-oh: a Confucian scholar.
- Kim Ga-hee as Yoo-hwa
- Kim Eun-soo as Jun-jeol: a Confucian scholar.
- Ha Gyu-rim as Im-chun: a lady who has bright and cheerful personality.
- Nam Tae-hoon as Tae-seong: a Confucian scholar.
- Choi Su-gyeon as Jung-yeon

==== Others ====
- Moon Sung-keun as Jang-cheol: spiritual leader of Confucian scholars.
- Min Ji-ah as In-ok: a captive woman taken by barbarians.

=== Extended ===
- Kim Seo-an as Young-rang: a young kisaeng.
- Jeon Guk-hyang as Ae-bok
- Kim Eun-woo as a general of the Qing dynasty
- Lee Young-seok as Deok-chul: a blacksmith worker.
- Lee Nam-hee as Lee Young-ik
- Jeon Jin-oh as Maeng-tan
- Yoo Ji-yeon as Hwa-yu
- Kim Jung-ho as Yoon Chin-wang

=== Special appearances ===
- Lee Soo-min as So-ya
- Yoo Jae-suk as a farmer
- Haha as a farmer
- Joo Woo-jae as a farmer
- Park Jin-joo as a farmer
- Lee Yi-kyung as a farmer
- Lee Mi-joo as a farmer
- Lee Mi-do as Yang-sseu

== Production ==
The script reading of the cast was held in December 2022.

In May 2023, the mother of two sisters who died following a 2004 sexual assault case involving a background actress alleged that one of the men accused in the case was recruiting background actors for My Dearest. MBC confirmed that the individual, who worked for an external background-actor management company, had visited some filming sites; the network barred him from the set and terminated its contract with the company.

On November 9, 2023, it was announced that the series would be extended by one episode due to its popularity, and would end with 21 episodes. The final episode aired on November 18.

== Reception ==
=== Viewership ===
My Dearest : South Korea viewers per episode (millions)

Part	Episode number											Average
Part	1	2	3	4	5	6	7	8	9	10	11	Average
1	1.011	0.728	0.991	0.976	1.441	1.752	1.955	1.843	1.883	2.269	–	1.485
2	1.441	1.812	1.835	2.231	2.020	2.099	2.018	1.911	2.229	2.301	2.388	2.026

Source: Audience measurement performed nationwide by Nielsen Korea.

Average TV viewership ratings
Ep.	Original broadcast date	Average audience share		
Ep.	Original broadcast date	Nielsen Korea		TNmS
Ep.	Original broadcast date	Nationwide	Seoul	Nationwide
Part 1
1	August 4, 2023	5.4% (9th)	5.4% (6th)	N/A
2	August 5, 2023	4.3% (8th)	4.4% (6th)	N/A
3	August 11, 2023	5.5% (11th)	5.3% (11th)	4.3% (18th)
4	August 12, 2023	5.2% (4th)	5.0% (4th)	4.4% (12th)
5	August 18, 2023	8.4% (3rd)	8.3% (3rd)	6.5% (7th)
6	August 19, 2023	8.8% (2nd)	8.3% (2nd)	N/A
7	August 25, 2023	10.6% (2nd)	10.1% (2nd)	8.0% (5th)
8	August 26, 2023	10.3% (2nd)	9.9% (2nd)	N/A
9	September 1, 2023	10.6% (2nd)	9.8% (2nd)	9.0% (4th)
10	September 2, 2023	12.2% (2nd)	11.5% (2nd)	N/A
Part 2
11	October 13, 2023	7.7% (4th)	7.5% (2nd)	6.6% (6th)
12	October 14, 2023	9.3% (2nd)	9.5% (2nd)	6.9% (2nd)
13	October 20, 2023	10.3% (1st)	9.9% (1st)	7.9% (5th)
14	October 21, 2023	11.7% (2nd)	10.9% (2nd)	N/A
15	October 27, 2023	11.8% (1st)	11.2% (1st)	9.5% (3rd)
16	October 28, 2023	12.0% (2nd)	11.3% (2nd)	N/A
17	November 4, 2023	11.4% (2nd)	11.3% (2nd)	N/A
18	November 10, 2023	10.8% (1st)	10.3% (1st)	7.6% (4th)
19	November 11, 2023	11.6% (2nd)	11.3% (2nd)	N/A
20	November 17, 2023	12.4% (1st)	12.5% (1st)	N/A
21	November 18, 2023	12.9% (2nd)	12.7% (2nd)	N/A
Average		9.7%	9.4%	— (Note: Due to multiple unpublished ratings, the exact average rating is unknown.)
Special	September 8, 2023 (Note: A special episode of the series titled "My Dearest Part 1 Rewind Film" aired on September 8, 2023, with narration by (G)I-dle's Miyeon.)	3.4% (18th)	3.5% (15th)	N/A
In the table above, the blue numbers represent the lowest ratings and the red numbers represent the highest ratings.; N/A denotes ratings that were not published.

=== Accolades ===
Name of the award ceremony, year presented, category, nominee(s) of the award, and the result of the nomination
Award ceremony	Year	Category	Nominee / Work	Result	Ref.
Baeksang Arts Awards	2024	Best Actor	Namkoong Min	Won	
Baeksang Arts Awards	2024	Best Drama	My Dearest	Won	
Baeksang Arts Awards	2024	Best Actress	Ahn Eun-jin	Nominated	
Grimae Awards	2023	Best Actor	Namkoong Min	Won	
Grimae Awards	2023	Best Actress	Ahn Eun-jin	Won	
Grimae Awards	2023	Directing Award	Kim Seong-yong and Cheon Soo-jin	Won	
Grimae Awards	2023	Grand Prize (Daesang)	My Dearest	Won	
Grimae Awards	2023	Lighting Award	Kwon Min-gu	Won	
MBC Drama Awards	2023	Best Character Award	Kim Jong-tae	Won	
MBC Drama Awards	2023	Best Couple Award	Namkoong Min and Ahn Eun-jin	Won	
MBC Drama Awards	2023	Best New Actor	Kim Mu-jun	Won	
MBC Drama Awards	2023	Best New Actor	Kim Yoon-woo	Won	
MBC Drama Awards	2023	Best New Actress	Park Jung-yeon	Won	
MBC Drama Awards	2023	Best Supporting Actor	Choi Young-woo	Won	
MBC Drama Awards	2023	Drama of the Year	My Dearest	Won	
MBC Drama Awards	2023	Grand Prize (Daesang)	Namkoong Min	Won	
MBC Drama Awards	2023	Top Excellence Award, Actress in a Miniseries	Ahn Eun-jin	Won	
MBC Drama Awards	2023	Top Excellence Award, Actress in a Miniseries	Lee Chung-ah	Nominated	
MBC Drama Awards	2023	Best Character Award	Choi Moo-sung	Nominated	
MBC Drama Awards	2023	Best New Actress	Jeon Hye-won	Nominated	
MBC Drama Awards	2023	Best Supporting Actress	Kwon So-hyun	Nominated	
MBC Drama Awards	2023	Excellence Award, Actor in a Miniseries	Lee Hak-joo	Nominated	
MBC Drama Awards	2023	Excellence Award, Actress in a Miniseries	Lee Da-in	Nominated	
MBC Drama Awards	2023	Top Excellence Award, Actor in a Miniseries	Namkoong Min	Nominated	
Seoul International Drama Awards	2024	Outstanding Korean Drama	My Dearest	Nominated	

=== Listicles ===
Name of publisher, year listed, name of listicle, recipient and placement
Publisher	Year	Listicle	Recipient	Placement	Ref.
Gallup Korea	2024	Best Television Couple of the Past 10 Years	Namkoong Min and Ahn Eun-jin	9th	
