= Oejibu =

Legal occupation in Joseon dynasty

A oejibu (Korean: 외지부; Hanja: 外知部; Korean pronunciation: [we̞d͡ʑibu]), sometimes translated as litigation helper or proxy handler, was a person who assisted private citizens in litigation in the early Joseon dynasty of Korea. Although the oejibu played a role that was similar in some ways to modern lawyers, they were not recognized or authorized by the state, and did not engage in courtroom debate. They were roughly analogous to the Chinese litigation masters. They were banned in the later half of the 15th century, and there are few references to them in historical records after the early 17th century, although they may have continued to practice in secret.

The name oejibu literally means "a jibu on the outside". The name originates from the Jangnyewon, a government office that adjudicated disputes over the ownership of slaves. The public officials who decided disputes in the Jangnyewon were known in Goryeo dynasty times as the dogwan jibu (도관지부; 都官知部), dogwan referring to the government office and jibu to their rank. The name oejibu thus referred to unofficial practitioners of such litigation, and by extension other litigation.

== Practice ==
The practice of the oejibu consisted largely of assisting people with composing petitions for submission to a state official, most commonly a local magistrate (suryeong). Litigation, consisting of adversarial petitions brought before a magistrate, was extremely common in the Joseon dynasty. Litigation over gravesite rights was especially frequent. Although there were no separate courts of law, the management of litigation was among the "seven fundamental affairs" of local magistrates as established in the Gyeongguk daejeon, as it had been among the "five fundamental affairs" under the preceding Goryeo dynasty.

Petitions under Joseon dynasty law had extensive formal requirements that were difficult for anyone without experience to comply with, and oejibu were sought out for this purpose. In early Joseon times oejibu also engaged in proxy litigation, appearing on others' behalf before the magistrate, although this practice was banned after 1478. Oejibu practiced largely in the Seoul area.

== Prohibition ==
Practicing as a oejibu was outlawed by royal decree in 1475, under the reign of King Seongjong, as Neo-Confucianism became established. The oejibu's work was seen as stirring up discord and contrary to the Confucian value of non-litigation (musong). Oejibu who were caught were subject to being banished to the border regions along with their entire household (jeon-ga sabyeon), a Korean punishment not found in the Five Punishments of traditional Chinese law.

There are few references to oejibu in historical records after the early 17th century. The last reference to them in the Veritable Records of the Joseon Dynasty was made in 1603, when a public official was convicted of acting as a oejibu. The ban on assisting others in litigation continued until 1905 under the Korean Empire, when a Western-style system of legal advocacy was adopted.

Despite the prohibition, the need of common people for assistance in preparing their petitions and rebuttals continued, and the activities of oejibu likely continued in secret. The Admonitions on Governing the People of Chŏng Yagyong in 1821, for example, mentioned commoners "borrowing the brushes" of others in order to get assistance in preparing complaints that would meet the magistrates' standards.

== Legacy ==
The role of the oejibu first came to modern attention through the scholarship of Korean legal historian Pak Pyŏng-ho in 1972.

A oejibu was the protagonist of the 2023 Korean historical drama Joseon Attorney.
