= Joseon Attorney =

2023 South Korean television series

- Promotional poster
- Also known as: Joseon Attorney: A Morality
- Hangul: 조선변호사
- Hanja: 朝鮮辯護士
- Lit.: Joseon Lawyer
- RR: Joseon byeonhosa
- MR: Chosŏn pyŏnhosa
- Genre: Period drama; Revenge; Action; Legal; Romance
- Based on: Joseon Attorney by Jung Ho Rak and Shim Jae Yong
- Developed by: Kim Ho-jun (planning)
- Written by: Choi Jin-young
- Directed by: Kim Seung-ho; Lee Han-joon
- Starring: Woo Do-hwan; Bona; Cha Hak-yeon
- Music by: Lim Ha-young
- Country of origin: South Korea
- Original language: Korean
- No. of episodes: 16

Production
- Executive producers: Lee Bo-young; Son Beom-seok
- Producers: Jeong Chan-hee; Park Tae-young
- Running time: 70 minutes
- Production companies: People Story Company; Won Contents

Original release
- Network: MBC TV
- Release: March 31 – May 20, 2023

Joseon Attorney (Korean: 조선변호사) is a 2023 South Korean television series starring Woo Do-hwan, Bona, and Cha Hak-yeon. It is based on webtoon with the same name by writer Jung Ho Rak and illustrator Shim Jae Yong, which was serialized on Bomtoon. It aired from March 31 to May 5, 2023 on MBC TV's Fridays and Saturdays at 21:50 (KST). It is also available for streaming on Wavve in South Korea, and on Kocowa and Viki in selected regions.

== Synopsis ==
The series is about a oejibu (attorney) who takes revenge on the enemy who killed his parents through trial.

== Cast ==
=== Main ===
- Woo Do-hwan as Kang Han-soo: a oejibu (attorney) with demonic charm.
- Bona as Lee Yeon-joo: a princess who sincerely cares about the country and its people. She is a woman of misfortune who faces an unattainable love while hiding her identity.
  - Lee Go-eun as young Lee Yeon-joo
- Cha Hak-yeon as Yoo Ji-sun: Yeon-joo's fiancé, who is a judge of Hanseongbu and the third generation of leaders from the most prestigious family in Joseon.

=== Supporting ===
==== People in the Palace ====
- Song Geon-hee as Seongjong of Joseon / Lee Hyul (personal name): The king of Joseon who dreams of strengthening his royal authority and establishing a state of law.
- Kim Ae-ran as Grand Queen Dowager Jaseong: Lee Hyul's grandmother.
- Han Sang-jo as Eunuch Go: Lee Hyul's right-hand man.

==== Ministers of Government ====
- Chun Ho-jin as Minister of Military Taxation Yoo Je-se: Ji-sun's father who has absolute power who monopolizes wealth and power.
- Choi Moo-sung as Choo Young-woo: the Right Chamchan who was responsible for the murders of Kang Han-soo's parents.
- Lee Jae-woon as Won Dae-han: the Left Chamchan
- Choi Byung-mo as Im Sang-ho: the Right State Councilor
- Nam Kyung-eup as Choi Soo-yong: the Left State Councilor

==== People around Kang Han-soo ====
- Lee Kyu-sung as Dong-chi: Han-soo's best friend and colleague, who has crush on Kang Eun-soo for a long time.
- Joo Ah as O-wol: a new gisaeng at Wolharu.
- Yoo Ye-bin as Jong-hyang: a gisaeng at Wolharu.
- Noh Haeng-ha as Myung-wol: a gisaeng at Wolharu.
- Han So-eun as Kang Eun-soo: Han-soo's younger sister.
- Kim Jong-tae as Kang Eon-jik: Han-soo's father.
- Min Ji-ah as Mrs. Lee: Han-soo's mother.

==== People around Lee Yeon-joo ====
- Shin Dong-mi as Lady Hong: Yeon-joo's nanny and the owner of Sowongak guesthouse.
- Lee Si-hoo as Choi Yoon: Lady Hong's nephew.
- Kim Do-yeon as Chef Baek: current chef in Sowongak.
- Han Min as the former king: Yeon-joo's father and Lee Hyul's uncle.

==== People around Yoo Ji-sun ====
- Kang Hyun-oh as Kim Ji-ho: Ji-sun's bodyguard.

==== Others ====
- Lee Jun-hyeok as Master Jang: a former police officer.
- Hong Wan-pyo as Jo Cheol-joo: Dae-bang's loyal limbs.
- Lee Chan-jong as Chu-sal: Dae-bang's limbs.

=== Extended ===
- Lee Tae-gum as Mr. Lee: a public officer.
- Hwang Man-ik as Heo Pan-yoon: the highest official of Hanseongbu.
- Jung Ah-mi as Park Yeo-in: an old woman with a suspicious secret.
- Jo Hee-bong as Park Je-soo: a pottery maker during the Joseon Dynasty who held power.

=== Special appearances ===
- Bae Hae-sun as Lady Yeon
- Kwon Ah-reum as Young-sil
- Byung Hun as Young-sil's husband (ep. 5 and 6)

== Difference from the original ==
In the original, Kang Han-soo appears as an only child, but in the drama, a younger sister character named Kang Eun-soo was added. The relationship between King Seongjong and Yeonju Lee, the current king, was changed to a cousin.

== Viewership ==
Joseon Attorney : South Korea viewers per episode (thousands)

Season	Episode number															
Season	1	2	3	4	5	6	7	8	9	10	11	12	13	14	15	16
1	520	531	531	N/A	N/A	N/A	700	798	N/A	N/A	N/A	N/A	456	N/A	N/A	N/A

Source: Audience measurement performed nationwide by Nielsen Korea.

Average TV viewership ratings
Ep.	Original broadcast date	Average audience share (Nielsen Korea)	
Ep.	Original broadcast date	Nationwide	Seoul
1	March 31, 2023	2.8% (21st)	2.8% (18th)
2	April 1, 2023	2.9% (21st)	N/A
3	April 7, 2023	2.9% (21st)	3.0% (18th)
4	April 8, 2023	2.7% (24th)	N/A
5	April 14, 2023	2.5% (25th)	N/A
6	April 15, 2023	2.2% (28th)	N/A
7	April 21, 2023	3.8% (14th)	3.5% (13th)
8	April 22, 2023	4.4% (15th)	4.5% (9th)
9	April 28, 2023	2.9% (20th)	N/A
10	April 29, 2023	2.8% (24th)	N/A
11	May 5, 2023	3.6% (21st)	3.6% (17th)
12	May 6, 2023	3.2% (20th)	3.3% (19th)
13	May 12, 2023	2.6% (21st)	N/A
14	May 13, 2023	2.3% (25th)	N/A
15	May 19, 2023	3.0% (20th)	2.5% (20th)
16	May 20, 2023	2.9% (20th)	3.0% (16th)
Average		3.0%	— (Note: Due to some ratings not recorded, the exact average rating is unknown.)
Special	March 24, 2023	1.8% (NR)	N/A
In the table above, the blue numbers represent the lowest ratings and the red numbers represent the highest ratings.; N/A denotes ratings that were not published.

== Awards and nominations ==
Name of the award ceremony, year presented, category, nominee(s) of the award, and the result of the nomination
Award ceremony	Year	Category	Nominee / Work	Result	Ref.
MBC Drama Awards	2023	Top Excellence Award, Actor in a Miniseries	Woo Do-hwan	Won	
MBC Drama Awards	2023	Best Character Award	Chun Ho-jin	Nominated	
MBC Drama Awards	2023	Best Couple Award	Woo Do-hwan and Kim Ji-yeon	Nominated	
MBC Drama Awards	2023	Best Supporting Actor	Lee Kyu-sung	Nominated	
MBC Drama Awards	2023	Drama of the Year	Joseon Attorney	Nominated	
MBC Drama Awards	2023	Excellence Award, Actor in a Miniseries	Cha Hak-yeon	Nominated	
MBC Drama Awards	2023	Excellence Award, Actress in a Miniseries	Kim Ji-yeon	Nominated	
