= Kim Yu-seok =

South Korean actor (born 1966)

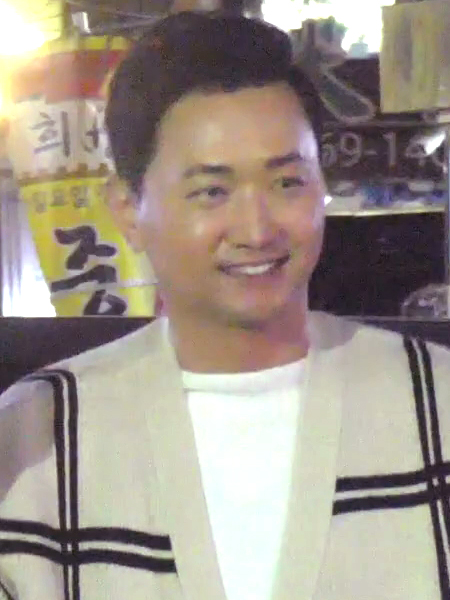
- Born: 22 September 1966 (age 60); South Korea
- Education: Dongguk University - Theater and Film; M.S. Schepkin Higher Theatre School - Master of Arts; Boris Shchukin Theatre Institute - Master of Arts
- Occupation: Actor
- Years active: 1986–present
- Agent: DMCC Entertainment

Korean name
- Hangul: 김유석
- Hanja: 金庾石
- RR: Gim Yuseok
- MR: Kim Yusŏk

Kim Yu-seok (Korean: 김유석; born 22 September 1966) is a South Korean actor. He starred in the films The Power of Kangwon Province (1998), The Isle (2000), Possible Changes (2005), Long and Winding Road (2006), and Family Matters (2006), as well as the television series Reservation for Love (2002), Thank You, My Life (2006), My Lovely Fool (2006), White Lie (2008) and Dream of the Emperor (2012).

== Filmography ==
=== Film ===
Year	Title	Role
1988	Youth's Punch	bit part
1998	The Power of Kangwon Province	Police officer
1998	Whispering Corridors	Art teacher
1999	Mayonnaise	Ah-jung's husband Kim Young-chul
2000	The Isle	Hyun-shik
2001	The Rhapsody	Yoo Sung-joon
2003	Scent of Love	Kang Seong-ho
2005	Possible Changes	Jong-kyu
2005	Long and Winding Road	Second son
2005	Love Is a Crazy Thing	(cameo)
2006	Family Matters	Sang-hoon
2009	Handphone	Han Joon-soo (cameo)

=== Television series ===
Year	Title	Role	Notes/Ref.
1998	MBC Best Theater – "Hippo"	Jin-soo	
1999	Sunday Best – "The Wind Blows in Yeouido"	Young-ho	one act-drama
2001	MBC Best Theater – "An Incomplete Love"	Young-joon	one act-drama
2001	MBC Best Theater – "Cigarette Store Girl"	Byung-gu	one act-drama
2001	Fox and Cotton Candy	Oh Kyu-tae	
2001	Picnic	Jong-ryul	
2002	MBC Best Theater – "Three Bonds and Pink Lady"	Park Jung-hoon	one act-drama
2002	Reservation for Love	Kim Sang-hyun	
2002	Gari-bong Elegy	Park Joon-ki	
2002	Confession	Kim Byung-ho	
2002	MBC Best Theater – "Lost Umbrella"	Park Min-ho	
2002	MBC Best Theater – "U-Turn in Sinchon"	Myung-seok	one act-drama
2003	Mittens	Hyun-kyu	
2003	Drama City – "Captured"	Ki-chan	
2003	Near to You	Lee Kyung-sik	
2003	The King's Woman	Prince Imhae	
2004	A Second Proposal	Seok Tae-woo	
2004	Toji, the Land	Kim Hwan/Gu-cheon	
2004	MBC Best Theater – "Dreaming of Romance"	Kim Young-ho	one act-drama
2005	Be Strong, Geum-soon!	Noh Si-hwan	
2006	Thank You, My Life	Lee In-seok	
2006	My Lovely Fool	Lee Ho-tae	
2007	Salt Doll	Kang Ji-seok	
2007	That Woman Is Scary	Baek Jung-jin	
2008	White Lie	Kang Jung-woo	
2010	Dong Yi	Jang Hee-jae	
2010	Smile Again	Lee Pil-jae	
2011	Gyebaek	Heung-soo	
2012	Syndrome	Min Sung-joon	
2012	Rooftop Prince	King, Prince Lee Gak's father	Cameo
2012	Dream of the Emperor	Kim Yu-sin	
2013	Your Neighbor's Wife	Ahn Seon-kyu	
2015	Blood	Jung Ji-tae	
2015	A Bird That Doesn't Sing	Oh Nam-gyu	
2019	The Golden Garden	Choi Dae-seong	
2020	No Matter What	Sin Joong-han	
2021	Red Shoes	Kwon Seok-hwan	
2023	Meant To Be	Kang Chi-hwan	

== Awards and nominations ==
Year	Award	Category	Nominated work	Result
2010	MBC Drama Awards	Golden Acting Award, Supporting Actor	Dong Yi	Won
2020	KBS Drama Awards	Excellence Award, Actor in a Daily Drama	No Matter What	Won
2023	MBC Drama Awards	Top Excellence Award, Actor in a Daily Drama	Meant to Be	Won
