= Kim Yoon-woo =

South Korean actor (born 2000)

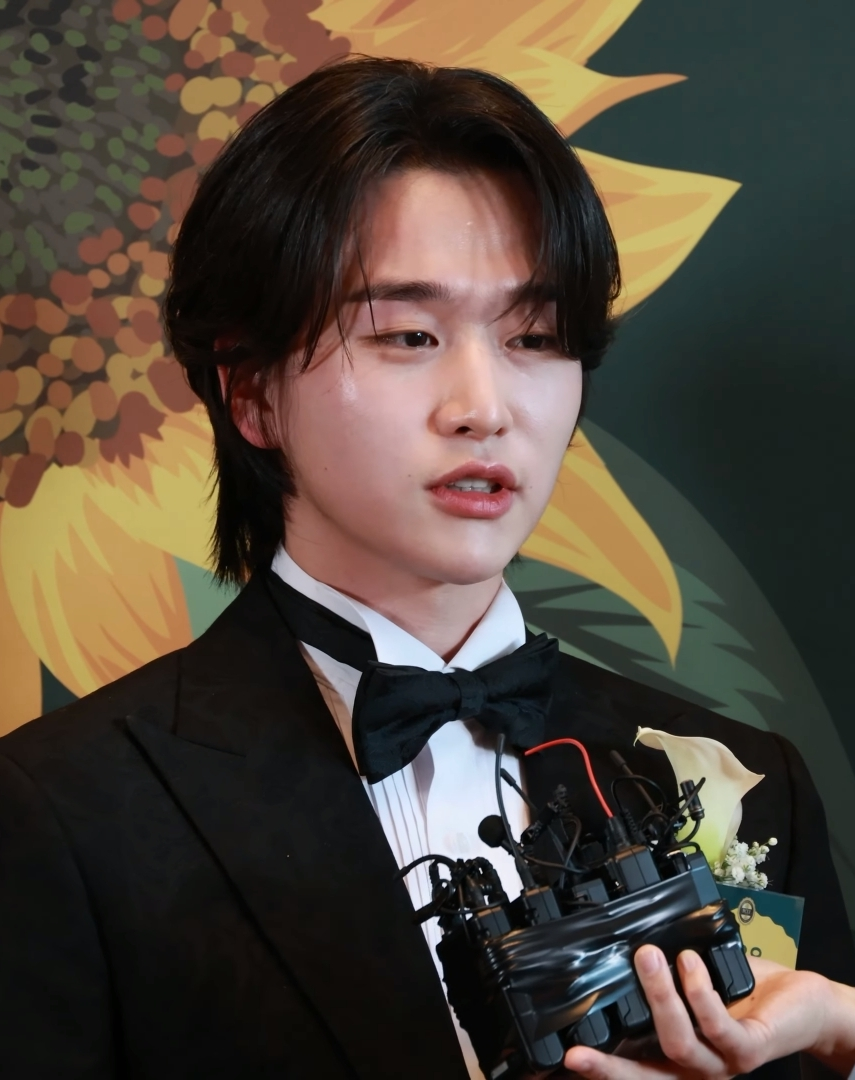
- Kim in May 2024
- Born: December 28, 2000 (age 25); South Korea
- Occupation: Actor
- Years active: 2021–present
- Agent: Wells Entertainment

Korean name
- Hangul: 김윤우
- RR: Gim Yunu
- MR: Kim Yunu

Kim Yoon-woo (Korean: 김윤우; born December 28, 2000) is a South Korean actor under Wells Entertainment. He made his acting debut in the 2021 Netflix film Sweet & Sour. He is best known in My Dearest (2023) and Begins ≠ Youth (2024).

== Career ==
Kim made his acting debut in the 2021 Netflix film Sweet & Sour.

== Filmography ==
=== Films ===
Year	Title	Role	Note(s)	Ref.
2021	Sweet & Sour	Team member 9		

=== Television series ===
Year	Title	Role	Note(s)	Ref.
2023	Delightfully Deceitful	Han Mu-yeong (young)		
2023	My Dearest	Ryang Eum		
2024	Gyeongseong Creature	Choi Gun		
2024	Begins ≠ Youth	Park Ha-ru		
2026	Doctor on the Edge	Yong Ju-cheon		

=== Web series ===
Year	Title	Role	Ref.
2022	Mimicus	Ji Soo-bin	

== Awards and nominations ==
Name of the award ceremony, year presented, award category, nominee(s) of the award, and the result of the nomination
Award ceremony	Year	Category	Nominee(s) / Work(s)	Result	Ref.
Brand Customer Loyalty Awards	2024	Best New Actor	Kim Yoon-woo	Won	
MBC Drama Awards	2023	Best New Actor	My Dearest	Won	
