= Oh My Baby =

2020 South Korean TV series

- Promotional poster
- Hangul: 오 마이 베이비
- RR: O mai beibi
- MR: O mai peibi
- Genre: Romantic comedy
- Written by: No Sun-jae
- Directed by: Nam Ki-hoon
- Starring: Jang Na-ra; Go Jun; Park Byung-eun; Jung Gun-joo
- Country of origin: South Korea
- Original language: Korean
- No. of episodes: 16

Production
- Running time: 63-70 minutes
- Production companies: Studio&NEW; Studio Dragon

Original release
- Network: TVN
- Release: May 13 – July 2, 2020

Oh My Baby (Korean: 오 마이 베이비) is a 2020 South Korean television series starring Jang Na-ra, Go Jun, Park Byung-eun and Jung Gun-joo. It premiered on tvN on May 13, 2020. The series is available for streaming starting from July 3, 2022, on Netflix in the United States.

== Synopsis ==
Jang Ha-ri (Jang Na-ra) is a 39-year-old single woman and a workaholic who has not been in a relationship for over 10 years but wants to have a baby of her own. Just when she has given up on love and marriage, three men appear in front of her.

== Cast ==
=== Main ===
- Jang Na-ra as Jang Ha-ri, a devoted manager who works for a magazine The Baby. She is in a race against time to have a child, even if it means skipping marriage. Now 39, she has three suitable prospects lining up to win her over.
- Ko Jun as Han I-sang, a narcissistic photographer who's always in high demand. He suffered heartbreak when his fiancée broke off their engagement, which was the reason for him to lose interest in relationships, and rejected Ha-ri on their first meeting.
- Park Byung-eun as Yoon Jae-young, a recently divorced pediatrician who has a daughter Do-a and is good friends with Ha-ri. He turns up to stay with Ha-ri at her mom's house on Ha-ri's mom's persuasion.
- Jung Gun-joo as Choi Kang-eu-tteum, a junior at Ha-ri's workplace who initially made her embarrassed by calling her Auntie

=== Supporting ===
- Kim Jae-hwa as Shim Jung-hwa
- Baek Seung-hee as Park Yeon-ho
- Park Soo-ah as Choi Hyo-joo
- Jung Sun-kyung as Lee So-yoon
- Kim Hye-ok as Lee Ok-ran, Ha-ri's mother who raised her single-handedly.
- Lee Mi-do as Kim Eun-yeong
- Jo Hee-bong as Nam Soo-cheol
- Yoon Jung-hoon as Yoon Seung-ho
- Kim Jung-hwa as Jung In-ah
- Wang Ji-hye as Seo Jung-won
- Kim Ye-ryeong as Lee Ok-hee
- Baek Seung-hee as Park Yeon-ho
- Lee Han-wi as Park Jae-han
- Yoo Seung-mok as Kim Cheol-joong, department head.

=== Special appearances ===
- Jang Gwang as President Jo (chairman) (Ep.4)
- Lee Dong-gun
- Yeo Hoe-hyun
- Jeon Hye-bin

== Viewership ==
Oh My Baby : South Korea viewers per episode (thousands)

Season	Episode number																Average
Season	1	2	3	4	5	6	7	8	9	10	11	12	13	14	15	16	Average
1	494	686	382	693	389	655	415	443	368	524	390	392	363	404	358	419	461

Source: Audience measurement performed nationwide by Nielsen Korea.

Average TV viewership ratings
Ep.	Original broadcast date	Average audience share	
Ep.	Original broadcast date	Nielsen Korea	
Ep.	Original broadcast date	Nationwide	Seoul
1	May 13, 2020	2.039%	2.401%
2	May 14, 2020	2.950%	3.647%
3	May 20, 2020	1.690%	1.873%
4	May 21, 2020	2.827%	3.039%
5	May 27, 2020	1.724%	1.800%
6	May 28, 2020	2.369%	2.312%
7	June 3, 2020	1.850%	1.934%
8	June 4, 2020	1.747%	1.801%
9	June 10, 2020	1.577%	1.512%
10	June 11, 2020	2.004%	2.235%
11	June 17, 2020	1.674%	1.591%
12	June 18, 2020	1.772%	1.498%
13	June 24, 2020	1.642%	1.418%
14	June 25, 2020	1.844%	1.832%
15	July 1, 2020	1.570%	1.370%
16	July 2, 2020	1.968%	1.854%
Average		1.953%	2.007%
In the table above, the blue numbers represent the lowest ratings and the red numbers represent the highest ratings.; This drama aired on a cable channel/pay TV which normally has a relatively smaller audience compared to free-to-air TV/public broadcasters (KBS, SBS, MBC and EBS).
