= Begins ≠ Youth =

2024 South Korean television series

- Promotional poster
- Hangul: 비긴즈유스
- RR: Biginjeuyuseu
- MR: Piginjŭyusŭ
- Genre: Drama
- Written by: Kim Soo-jin; Choi Woo-joo
- Directed by: Kim Jae-hong
- Starring: Seo Ji-hoon; Noh Jong-hyun; Ahn Ji-ho; Seo Young-joo; Kim Yoon-woo; Jung Woo-jin; Jeon Jin-seo
- Country of origin: South Korea
- Original language: Korean
- No. of episodes: 12

Production
- Executive producer: Kim Jung-mi
- Producers: Seo Jang-won; Kang Bo-ah
- Cinematography: Lee Hyo-jae; Im Chang-wook
- Editor: Kim Hyang-sook
- Production companies: Hybe Corporation; Chorokbaem Media
- Budget: ₩40 billion

Original release
- Network: Xclusive (Note: An NFT marketplace-based streaming service owned by FingerLabs, a subsidiary of Hyper Corporation.)
- Release: April 30 – May 14, 2024

Begins ≠ Youth (Korean: 비긴즈유스) is a 2024 South Korean drama television series based on the BTS Universe, starring Seo Ji-hoon, Noh Jong-hyun, Ahn Ji-ho, Seo Young-joo, Kim Yoon-woo, Jung Woo-jin, and Jeon Jin-seo. It was released on Xclusive from April 30, to May 14, 2024, every Tuesday at 16:00 (KST).

== Synopsis ==
Begins ≠ Youth expands on the storyline fans have seen throughout BTS' music videos and Save Me webtoon. The story begins with Kim Hwan meeting the other six boys. He learns that everyone is dealing with their own struggles, and together, they learn to overcome their greatest difficulties.

== Cast and characters ==
=== Main ===
- Seo Ji-hoon as Kim Hwan
- Seo Young-joo as Kim Do-geon
- Jeon Jin-seo as Jeon Je-ha
- Jung Woo-jin as Kim Joo-an
- Noh Jong-hyun as Min Ce-in
- Kim Yoon-woo as Park Ha-ru
- Ahn Ji-ho as Jeong Ho-su

=== Supporting ===
- Jung Sung-il as Kim Chang-jun
- Kim Nam-hee as Song Jun-ho
- Nam Myeong-ryeol as Koo Hyun-bok
- Woo Hee-jin as Hwang Seo-yun
- Sung Ji-ru as a disciplinarian
- Kim Young-woong as Kim Seong-hun
- Lee Hang-na as Shim Seon-mi
- Yoo Se-hyung as Choi Ji-han

=== Others ===
- Park Ah-sung as Kim Do-hyun, Do-geon's brother
- Lee Si-hoo as Thug

== Production ==
=== Development ===
On August 21, 2019, Big Hit Entertainment's co-CEO Bang Si-hyuk announced that a drama based on the debut days of BTS was in the early stages of production to be released in the second half of 2020 as part of the BTS Universe. The series is co-produced by Chorokbaem Media. Originally titled Blue Sky (Korean: 푸른 하늘; RR: Pureun haneul), the series' name was later changed to Youth.

=== Casting ===
On June 17, 2020, it was reported that the production companies were in the process of casting the main and supporting actors, and that the main cast would only consist of rookie actors. On October 19, it was announced that Seo Ji-hoon, Noh Jong-hyun, Ahn Ji-ho, Seo Young-joo, Kim Yoon-woo, Jung Woo-jin and Jeon Jin-seo would star in the series.

=== Filming ===
Filming was halted in late October 2020 following concerns raised by fans about the characters' names being the same as the group members' names. Originally scheduled to resume in early December, filming was eventually pushed back to January 2021. On April 7, 2021, it was announced that the main characters' names would be changed, and some scenes reshot.

=== Post-Production ===
Chorokbaem Media announced the end of production in late November and began post-production to enhance the "quality" of the series.

== Release ==
Chorokbaem Media also noted that the series will soon begin discussions with an unnamed "global OTT platform" for its distribution and broadcasting.

The series was originally slated to premiere in 2021, but it was delayed due to post-production improvements.

On May 14, 2023, the first teaser was released at Korea Expo in Paris, France, making the series the first paradigm of content distribution with Web 3.0 technology in the world. On July 31, Chorokbaem Media and Hybe announced that the series was acquired by the NFT marketplace-based streaming service Xclusive, owned by Hyper Corporation's subsidiary FingerLabs. Begins ≠ Youth was the service's first original content.

On March 27, 2024, Chorokbaem Media announced that they would begin pre-sales of viewing rights starting April. It consists of a total of 12 episodes, divided into three parts of four episodes each. Pre-sales of viewing rights for the entire drama would take place for a month starting from the first week of April, and the actual sale of viewing rights would begin from the first week of May.

The series was released on Xclusive on April 30, 2024.
