= Samsaengi =

South Korean television series

- Promotional poster
- Hangul: 삼생이
- RR: Samsaengi
- MR: Samsaengi
- Genre: Period drama Romance; Medical drama
- Written by: Lee Eun-joo
- Directed by: Kim Won-yong
- Starring: Hong Ah-reum; Son Sung-yoon; Cha Do-jin; Ji Il-joo
- Country of origin: South Korea
- Original language: Korean
- No. of episodes: 120

Production
- Producer: Kim Sung-geun
- Production location: Korea
- Running time: 35 minutes Mondays through Fridays at 09:00 (KST)

Original release
- Network: Korean Broadcasting System
- Release: January 7 – June 21, 2013

Samsaengi (Korean: 삼생이) is a 2013 South Korean television series starring Hong Ah-reum, Son Sung-yoon, Cha Do-jin, and Ji Il-joo. It aired on KBS2 from January 7 to June 21, 2013, on Mondays to Fridays at 9:00 a.m. for 120 episodes.

== Plot ==
Samsaengi is set in the 70's in Seoul and tells the story of a woman (played by Hong Ah-reum) who becomes a promising oriental herbal doctor after going through many ups and downs in her life. It is also about innocent, yet desperate love of four different people who have different ways of love.

== Cast ==
=== Main characters ===
- Hong Ah-reum - Seok Sam-saeng
  - Kwak Ji-hye - young Seok Sam-saeng
  - Jung Ji-so - teen Seok Sam-saeng
- Son Seong-yoon - Bong Geum-ok
  - Jang Seo-hee - young Bong Geum-ok
  - Kim Ji-min - teen Bong Geum-ok
- Cha Do-jin - Park Dong-woo
  - Kim Ji-hoon - teen Park Dong-woo
- Ji Il-joo - Oh Ji-sung
  - Jung Yoo-geun - young Oh Ji-sung
  - Kim Seung-chan - teen Oh Ji-sung

=== Supporting characters ===
Seok Bong-chool's family

- Lee Dol-hyung - Seok Bong-chool
- Lee Ah-hyun - Ko Mak-rye
- Shin Hyun-tak - Seok Chang-sik
  - Jung Seung-won - teen Seok Chang-sik
- Lee Soo-bin - Seok Chang-hee

Bong Moo-ryong's family

- Dokgo Young-jae - Bong Moo-ryong
- Yoo Tae-woong - Sa Ki-jin
- Lee Yeon-soo - Hae-joo
- Ban Hyo-jung - Bong Moo-ryong's mother

Oh Pil-soon's family

- Kim Na-woon - Oh Pil-soon
- Ko Do-young - Jung Yoon-hee
  - Lee Jae-in - young Jung Yoon-hee
  - Kim Hye-yoon - teen Jung Yoon-hee

Oh In-soo's family

- Kim Seung-wook - Oh In-soo
- Kim Do-yeon - Park Kyung-ja

Extended cast

- Ha Soo-ho - Young-bae

== Awards and nominations ==
Year	Award	Category	Recipient	Result
2013	KBS Drama Awards	Best Drama	Samsaengi	Nominated
2013	KBS Drama Awards	Excellence Award, Actor in a Daily Drama	Yoo Tae-woong	Nominated
2013	KBS Drama Awards	Excellence Award, Actress in a Daily Drama	Hong Ah-reum	Nominated
2013	KBS Drama Awards	Best Young Actor	Kim Ji-hoon	Nominated
2013	KBS Drama Awards	Best Young Actress	Jung Ji-so	Nominated

== See also ==
- Korean Broadcasting System
