= Attorney at foreign law =

Attorneys at foreign law (外国法事務弁護士, gaikokuhō jimu bengoshi), or gaiben (外弁) for short, are lawyers from foreign countries licensed to practice law in Japan.

The term gaiben is composed of the characters for 外 (gai), defined as "outside, without" and 弁 (ben)", defined as speech, tongue". Two authoritative translations of the term are Registered Foreign Lawyers (RFL), or Foreign Special Members. The colloquial term "gaiben" is often used by individuals, but is not determinative.

== Qualification ==
Before becoming a gaiben, a lawyer must:

- be admitted to the bar in a foreign jurisdiction,
- have at least three years of experience practicing law in that jurisdiction (one year of which may be spent working in Japan), and
- show that reciprocity exists with their home jurisdiction—i.e., that a Japanese attorney could become similarly qualified to practice there (this condition is waived for lawyers admitted in WTO member states).

A 13-member screening committee of the Japan Federation of Bar Associations reviews each application, a process which usually takes several months. Upon approval, the lawyer's official title becomes "Attorney at Foreign Law for [state]," with their home jurisdiction filled in.

== Occupation ==
By law, gaiben can only give advice pertaining to the law of their home jurisdiction, and cannot draft legal documents or represent Japanese clients in intrastate matters or probate matters without the assistance of a qualified bengoshi (attorney at law). They are also prohibited from representing clients in courtroom litigation, although they may represent clients in private arbitration. As a result, they are generally involved in intermediating between foreign clients and Japanese lawyers, intermediating between foreign and Japanese clients, or assisting Japanese clients with foreign legal matters.

Several thousand foreign-qualified lawyers, many of them Japanese nationals, work in Japan as employees of law firms or corporate legal departments without being admitted as gaiben. Nonetheless, there are several legal benefits to qualifying as a gaiben:

- They may open their own offices (外国法事務弁護士事務所, gaikokuhō jimu bengoshi jimusho; sometimes abbreviated "GJBJ").
- They may become partners in Japanese law firms. Gaiben offices may also enter joint ventures with Japanese law firms; several major U.S. and British law firms have structured their Tokyo operations in this manner, notably Baker & McKenzie and White & Case.
- They may enter Japan on special "attorney" visas, which permit them to sponsor the visas of others. Non-gaiben attorneys must enter Japan as general professionals sponsored by a law firm or company.

The main drawback to qualifying as a gaiben is the cost of Japanese bar association membership (such as Ichiben, Daini, etc.), which is often between ¥25,000 and ¥60,000 per month.

As of June 2013 there were 363 gaiben registered in Japan, almost all of whom were registered with one of the three Tokyo bar associations. The main jurisdictions of admission were New York (102), England and Wales (60), California (45), the People's Republic of China (29), New South Wales (16) and Hawaii (14). As of 2025, there are approximately 550 gaiben registered in Japan.

== History ==
Foreign lawyers were allowed to practice with varying restrictions in Japan from 1876 until 1955. Prior to 1949, their practice was limited to cases involving foreigners or international matters. From 1949 until 1955, foreign lawyers were allowed to practice both Japanese and foreign law by registering with the Supreme Court of Japan, and were even allowed to litigate in cases involving foreign aliens. Although this system ended in 1955, lawyers already registered under the system, known as junkaiin or "quasi-members" of the bar, were allowed to continue practicing. The junkaiin played a major role in Japan's international trade during the following decades, and trained many Japanese lawyers in the area of international business transactions. It was also common for foreign lawyers to serve as "trainees" in Japanese law firms, effectively practicing foreign law under the supervision of a Japanese-qualified attorney.

In 1977, Milbank, Tweed, Hadley & McCloy became the first foreign law firm to establish an office in Tokyo under its own name, amid opposition from both the Ministry of Justice and Japan Federation of Bar Associations, who viewed it as illegal for foreign lawyers to practice in Japan. Despite these protests, Milbank's office remained open through the early 1980s, and along with the office of a Hong Kong-based firm, was the only office of a foreign law firm in Japan during that time. The United States government began to view the restrictions on foreign lawyers as a trade barrier during the early 1980s, and in 1984, the Japan Federation of Bar Associations exchanged proposals with the American Bar Association regarding a new foreign lawyer registration system.

The initial Special Measures Law Concerning the Handling of Legal Business by Foreign Lawyers, or gaiben law, effective in 1987, allowed foreign lawyers with requisite work experience to practice foreign law in Japan, but prohibited employment of, or partnership with, Japanese attorneys, and also prohibited the use of any firm name other than the foreign lawyer's own name. A revised law enacted in 1994 made it possible to establish fee-sharing (but not profit-sharing) "joint enterprises" between gaiben and local lawyers. Further revisions in 2003 removed the prohibitions on employment of Japanese attorneys and allowed profit-sharing joint ventures between foreign and Japanese attorneys.

The interpretation of the licensing requirements has varied between firms over time, and not all foreign lawyers in Japan are registered. In 2005, the Japan Federation of Bar Associations circulated a letter requesting that all foreign partners in law firms in Japan register as gaiben. This was followed in 2009 by a similar letter requesting that all foreign attorneys providing legal services in Japan be registered as gaiben, regardless of their title within their firm; the JFBA later clarified that this was not intended to impose new requirements but rather to remind firms of existing requirements.

== See also ==
- Foreign Legal Consultant
