= Baek Seung-hee =

South Korean actress (born 1986)

- Born: 12 September 1986 (age 40); Busan, South Korea
- Other name: Baek Seung-hui
- Occupation: Actress
- Years active: 2003–present
- Agent: Steit Entertainment
- Known for: Oh My Baby; Remarriage & Desires; Blind

Korean name
- Hangul: 백승희
- RR: Baek Seunghui
- MR: Paek Sŭnghŭi

Baek Seung-hee (Korean: 백승희; born 12 September 1986) is a South Korean actress. She is known for her roles in dramas such as A Bird That Doesn't Sing, Secret Garden, Oh My Baby, Remarriage & Desires and Blind.

== Filmography ==
=== Television series ===
Year	Title	Role	Ref.
2007	Likeable or Not	Lee Soo-jung	
2009	Empress Cheonchu	Queen Mundeok	
2009	High Kick Through the Roof	Baek Seung-hee	
2010	Secret Garden	Park Chae-rin	
2011	Detectives in Trouble	Shin Yoo-mi	
2011	Me Too, Flower!	Lee Yeong-hee	
2012	I Do, I Do	Uhm Yoo-jin	
2012	May Queen	Jo Min-gyeong	
2014	KBS TV Novel – "Land of Gold"	Han Jin-kyung	
2014	One Sunny Day	Couple girl	
2015	A Bird That Doesn't Sing	Oh Yoo-mi	
2016	The Unusual Family	Heo Soon-shim	
2017	A Korean Odyssey	Wooden doll ghost's bride	
2018	Sunny Again Tomorrow	Lee Han-na	
2019	The Golden Garden	Seo Hye-yeong	
2020	Oh My Baby	Park Yeon-ho	
2020	Get Revenge	Song Seon-mi	
2021	Revolutionary Sisters	Bae Seul-cheo	
2022	Kiss Sixth Sense	Eun-jung	
2022	Remarriage & Desires	Han Jung-ok	
2022	Blind	Yeom Hye-jin	
2023	Destined With You	Concubine Jung	
2026	The Judge Returns	Yu Ha-na	

=== Film ===
Year	Title	Role	Ref.
2019	Scent of a Ghost	Milk Lady	

=== Music video appearances ===
Year	Title	Artist	Length	Ref.
2008	I'm Sorry Oppa	Elvis	4:00	
2009	Wedding Dress	Taeyang	4:03	
2010	Over Time	Baek Ji-young	4:30	

== Awards and nominations ==
Name of the award ceremony, year presented, category, nominee of the award, and the result of the nomination
Award ceremony	Year	Category	Result	Ref.
World Best Model Contest Folk Costume Award	2003	Asia Award Special Award	Won	
Winner of the World Best Model Contest	2003	Best Model Award	Won	
