= Kim Mu-jun =

South Korean actor (born 1998)

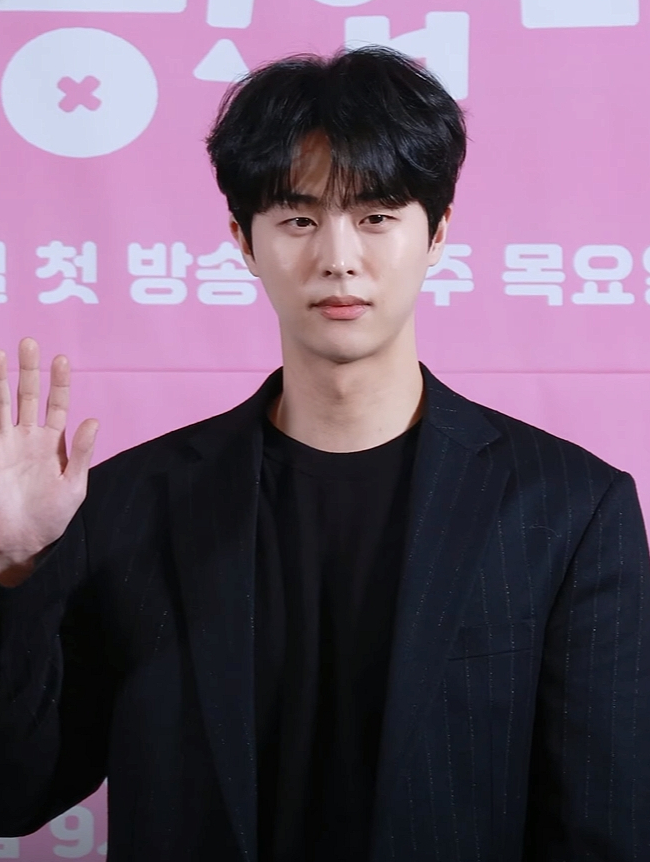
- Kim in December 2024
- Born: May 24, 1998 (age 28); Busan, South Korea
- Occupation: Actor
- Years active: 2020–present
- Agent: 9Ato Entertainment

Korean name
- Hangul: 김무준
- RR: Gim Mujun
- MR: Kim Mujun

Kim Mu-jun (Korean: 김무준; born May 24, 1998) is a South Korean actor under 9Ato Entertainment. He made his acting debut in the 2020 web series New Learn.

== Filmography ==
=== Television series ===
Year	Title	Role	Notes	Ref.
2021	Nevertheless	Yoo Se-hoon		
2022	Love All Play	Yook Jung-hwan		
2022	My Dearest	Crown Prince Sohyeon		
2024	Sorry Not Sorry	Kim Ian		
2024	Black Forceps	Park Min-jae	Japanese series	
2025	Genie, Make a Wish	Ko Yeong-hyeon		
2025	Dynamite Kiss	Kim Sun-woo		

=== Web series ===
Year	Title	Role	Notes	Ref.
2020	New Learn	Oh Beop	Debut acting	
2020	It's Okay to Be Sensitive	Ha Hae-joon	Season 3	

== Awards and nominations ==
Name of the award ceremony, year presented, award category, nominee(s) of the award, and the result of the nomination
Award ceremony	Year	Category	Nominee(s) / Work(s)	Result	Ref.
MBC Drama Awards	2023	Best New Actor	My Dearest	Won	
SBS Drama Awards	2025	Best New Actor	Dynamite Kiss	Won	
