= Sunny Again Tomorrow =

2018 South Korean television series

- Promotional poster
- Also known as: Tomorrow Is Sunny as Well; Clear Tomorrow
- Hangul: 내일도 맑음
- RR: Naeildo malgeum
- MR: Naeildo malgŭm
- Genre: Family; Melodrama
- Written by: Kim Min-Joo
- Directed by: Eo Soo-Sun
- Starring: Seol In-ah; Jin Ju-hyung; Ha Seung-ri; Lee Jae-baek
- Country of origin: South Korea
- Original language: Korean
- No. of episodes: 121 (Note: Originally scheduled to air for 120 episodes, the series was extended by one episode in lieu of nine pre-empts.)

Production
- Executive producer: Bae Kyung-soo
- Running time: 35 minutes
- Production company: KBS Drama Production

Original release
- Network: KBS1
- Release: May 7 – November 2, 2018

Sunny Again Tomorrow (Korean: 내일도 맑음) is a 2018 South Korean television series starring Seol In-ah, Jin Ju-hyung, Ha Seung-ri, and Lee Chang-wook. The series aired daily on KBS1 from 8:25 p.m. to 9:00 p.m. (KST) starting from May 7, 2018.

== Cast ==
=== Main ===
- Seol In-ah as Kang Ha-nee
- Jin Ju-hyung as Lee Han-kyul
- Ha Seung-ri as Hwang Ji-eun
- Lee Chang-wook as Park Do-kyung

=== Supporting ===
==== People around Ha-nee ====
- Yoon Bok-in as Lim Eun-ae
- Yoo Hyun-joo as Kang Sa-rang

==== People around Ji-eun ====
- Nam Leung-mi as Madam Moon
- Shim Hye-jin as Yoon Jin-hee
- Ji Soo Won as Yoon Seon-hee
- Kim Myung-soo as Hwang Dong-seok
- Kim Tae-min as Hwang Ji-hoo

==== People around Han-kyul ====
- Seo Hyun-chul as Lee Sang-hoon
- Choi Wan-jung as Kim So-hyun
- Baek Seung-hee as Lee Han-na
- Robin Deiana as Leo

==== People around Do-kyung ====
- Choi Jae-sung as Park Jin-guk

=== Cameo ===
- Hong Ah-reum as fake Han Soo-jung/Choi Yoo-ra
- Lee Yong-yi as Hwang Dong-seok's mother

== Original soundtrack ==
Sunny Again Tomorrow OST

Soundtrack album by Various artists
- Genre: Soundtrack
- Languages: Korean; English
- Labels: Danal Entertainment; Plus Media

=== Part 1 ===
Released on May 11, 2018
No.	Title	Artist	Length
1.	"Sunny Again Tomorrow" (내일도 맑음)	Keumjo (Nine Muses)	3:18
2.	"Sunny Again Tomorrow" (Inst.)		3:18
Total length:			6:36

=== Part 2 ===
Released on May 18, 2018
No.	Title	Artist	Length
1.	"Now, We" (지금, 우리)	Acousweet	4:30
2.	"Now, We" (Inst.)		4:30
Total length:			9:00

=== Part 3 ===
Released on May 26, 2018
No.	Title	Artist	Length
1.	"I Want To See It" (보고싶게 하나요)	Han Kyung-il	4:28
2.	"I Want To See It" (Inst.)		4:28
Total length:			8:56

=== Part 4 ===
Released on May 26, 2018
No.	Title	Artist	Length
1.	"You To Me, Me To You" (너에게 난 나에게 넌)	Song Ha-ye
2.	"You To Me, Me To You" (Inst.)

=== Part 5 ===
Released on June 6, 2018
No.	Title	Artist	Length
1.	"Life is Like That" (사는게 그렇지 뭐)	Project No. 406	3:17
2.	"Life is Like That" (Inst.)		3:17
Total length:			6:34

=== Part 6 ===
Released on June 17, 2018
No.	Title	Artist	Length
1.	"Come to My Heart (Duet Ver.)" (내 맘에 놀러와 (Duet Ver.))	Coda Bridge	3:25
2.	"Come to My Heart (Duet Ver.)" (Inst.)		3:25
Total length:			6:50

=== Part 7 ===
Released on June 24, 2018
No.	Title	Artist	Length
1.	"My Only Love Is You" (나만의 사랑, 너야)	Jatanpoong	3:32
2.	"My Only Love Is You" (Inst.)		3:32
Total length:			7:04

=== Part 8 ===
Released on July 1, 2018
No.	Title	Artist	Length
1.	"Memory with You" (너와의 기억)	Woo Eun-mi	3.46
2.	"Memory with You" (Inst.)		3.46
Total length:			6.92

=== Part 9 ===
Released on July 17, 2018
No.	Title	Artist	Length
1.	"Can you hear my heart" (내 마음이 들리나요)	With You	3.13
2.	"Can you hear my heart" (Inst.)		3.13
Total length:			6.26

=== Part 10 ===
Released on July 15, 2018
No.	Title	Artist	Length
1.	"You Are My Star"	Kim Hye Rim	4.07
2.	"You Are My Star" (Inst.)		4.07
Total length:			8.14

=== Part 11 ===
Released on July 20, 2018
No.	Title	Artist	Length
1.	"No Special Day" (특별하지 않은 날)	Jo Moon Geun	4.00
2.	"No Special Day" (Inst.)		4.00
Total length:			8.00

=== Part 12 ===
Released on July 25, 2018
No.	Title	Artist	Length
1.	"After The Rain" (이 비가 그치면)	Hansalchae	3.29
2.	"After The Rain" (Inst.)		3.29
Total length:			6.58

=== Part 13 ===
Released on July 28, 2018
No.	Title	Artist	Length
1.	"It's You" (그대입니다)	Park Kang Soo	4.07
2.	"It's You" (Inst.)		4.07
Total length:			8.14

=== Part 14 ===
Released on August 4, 2018
No.	Title	Artist	Length
1.	"A Shy Confession" (수줍은 고백)	Joo Won Tak	4.00
2.	"A Shy Confession" (Inst.)		4.00
Total length:			8.00

=== Part 15 ===
Released on August 11, 2018
No.	Title	Artist	Length
1.	"Maybe It's Love" (아무래도 사랑인가봐)	Soya	3.47
2.	"아무래도 사랑인가봐" (Inst.)		3.47
Total length:			7.34

=== Part 16 ===
Released on August 18, 2018
No.	Title	Artist	Length
1.	"I'm Happy"	Marmalade Kitchen	3.49
2.	"I'm Happy" (Inst.)		3.49
Total length:			7.38

=== Part 17 ===
Released on August 25, 2018
No.	Title	Artist	Length
1.	"Cool Love (Freshing!!)" (Cool Love (시원해!!))	Song Ha Ye, Lee Do Hoon	3.32
2.	"Cool Love (Freshing!!)" (Inst.)		3.32
Total length:			7.04

=== Part 18 ===
Released on September 1, 2018
No.	Title	Artist	Length
1.	"Don't Know Love" (사랑을 모르겠어)	The Daisy	4.11
2.	"Don't Know Love" (Inst.)		4.11
Total length:			8.22

=== Part 19 ===
Released on September 5, 2018
No.	Title	Artist	Length
1.	"You Liked It" (좋았었잖아)	BB Ahn	4.09
2.	"You Liked It" (Inst.)		4.09
Total length:			8.18

=== Part 20 ===
Released on September 13, 2018
No.	Title	Artist	Length
1.	"Hurtful" (아프고 아프고 아프다)	Lydia	3.28
2.	"Hurtful" (Inst.)		3.28
Total length:			6.56

=== Part 21 ===
Released on September 21, 2018
No.	Title	Artist	Length
1.	"Love You But, I Love You But" (사랑하지만 널 사랑하지만)	Morning Coffee	2.57
2.	"Love You But, I Love You But" (Inst.)		2.57
Total length:			5.54

=== Part 22 ===
Released on September 24, 2018
No.	Title	Artist	Length
1.	"Why" (왜일까)	Ahn Ye Seul	4.10
2.	"Why" (Inst.)		4.09
Total length:			8.19

=== Part 23 ===
Released on September 27, 2018
No.	Title	Artist	Length
1.	"Parting Need A Time" (이별도 시간이 필요하다)	Taesabiae	3.55
2.	"Parting Need A Time" (Inst.)		3.55
Total length:			7.50

=== Part 24 ===
Released on September 30, 2018
No.	Title	Artist	Length
1.	"Don't Worry" (놀라지마요)	Hwang Si Yeon	3.59
2.	"Don't Worry" (Inst.)		3.59
Total length:			7.58

=== Part 25 ===
Released on October 3, 2018
No.	Title	Artist	Length
1.	"Close Your Eyes"	Kim Eun Bi	3.45
2.	"Close Your Eyes" (Inst.)		3.45
Total length:			7.30

=== Part 26 ===
Released on October 14, 2018
No.	Title	Artist	Length
1.	"Finally Now"	Arie Band	4.45
2.	"Finally Now" (Inst.)		4.45
Total length:			9.30

=== Part 27 ===
Released on October 18, 2018
No.	Title	Artist	Length
1.	"I Do"	Street. 75	3.57
2.	"Finally Now" (Inst.)		3.57
Total length:			7.54

=== Part 28 ===
Released on October 24, 2018
No.	Title	Artist	Length
1.	"누군가를 그리워하는 것"	Kim Chae Ran	4.12
2.	"누군가를 그리워하는 것" (Inst.)		4.12
Total length:			8.24

=== Part 29 ===
Released on October 30, 2018
No.	Title	Artist	Length
1.	"Wishing For Your Happiness"	Lee Dong Yoon	4.22
2.	"Wishing For Your Happiness" (Inst.)		4.22
Total length:			8.44

=== Part 30 ===
Released on November 2, 2018
No.	Title	Artist	Length
1.	"Home"	Lee Do Hoon	3.15
2.	"Home" (Inst.)		3.15
Total length:			6.30

== Viewership ==
- In this table, the blue numbers represent the lowest ratings and the red numbers represent the highest ratings.
- N/A denotes that the rating is not known.
- TNmS stop publishing their report from June 2018.

Ep.	Original broadcast date	Average audience share			
Ep.	Original broadcast date	TNmS Ratings		AGB Nielsen	
Ep.	Original broadcast date	Nationwide	Seoul National Capital Area	Nationwide	Seoul National Capital Area
1	May 7, 2018	18.9% (1st)	14.8%	16.5% (1st)	15.4% (1st)
2	May 8, 2018	16.9% (1st)	13.4%	14.8% (1st)	13.3% (1st)
3	May 9, 2018	18.3% (1st)	14.9%	15.6% (1st)	14.2% (1st)
4	May 10, 2018	17.2% (1st)	13.5%	14.8% (1st)	13.1% (1st)
5	May 11, 2018	17.3% (1st)	13.8%	13.9% (2nd)	12.4% (2nd)
6	May 14, 2018	19.7% (1st)	16.1%	16.6% (1st)	15.0% (1st)
7	May 15, 2018	18.0% (1st)	14.8%	14.5% (1st)	13.3% (2nd)
8	May 16, 2018	18.8% (1st)	14.9%	15.0% (2nd)	14.2% (1st)
9	May 17, 2018	20.7% (1st)	16.4%	16.9% (1st)	15.6% (1st)
10	May 18, 2018	18.1% (1st)	14.0%	14.6% (1st)	12.5% (2nd)
11	May 21, 2018	19.7% (1st)	15.4%	16.5% (1st)	15.2% (1st)
12	May 22, 2018	15.9% (1st)	11.3%	16.2% (1st)	14.6% (1st)
13	May 23, 2018	19.8% (1st)	15.7%	15.2% (1st)	14.2% (1st)
14	May 24, 2018	20.7% (1st)	16.3%	16.4% (1st)	15.0% (1st)
15	May 25, 2018	18.3% (1st)	14.0%	14.2% (1st)	13.1% (2nd)
16	May 28, 2018	15.8% (1st)	11.7%	13.3% (1st)	12.2% (2nd)
17	May 29, 2018	19.1% (1st)	15.6%	16.3% (1st)	14.8% (1st)
18	May 30, 2018	18.2% (1st)	13.9%	15.3% (1st)	14.0% (1st)
19	May 31, 2018	19.6% (1st)	15.0%	15.6% (1st)	15.1% (1st)
20	June 1, 2018	15.4%	11.6%	13.3% (1st)	12.5% (2nd)
21	June 4, 2018	19.5%	14.9%	16.1% (1st)	14.6% (1st)
22	June 5, 2018	17.9%	13.5%	14.6% (1st)	13.3% (1st)
23	June 6, 2018	17.9%	13.6%	16.0% (1st)	14.7% (1st)
24	June 7, 2018	18.9%	14.2%	16.5% (1st)	15.8% (1st)
25	June 8, 2018	18.5%	13.9%	15.8% (1st)	14.4% (1st)
26	June 11, 2018	18.7%	14.1%	16.7% (1st)	15.0% (1st)
27	June 14, 2018 (Note: No episodes were aired on June 12 due to news coverage of the USA-North Korean Summit in Singapore, and on June 13 due to election day news coverage.)	17.0%	13.2%	16.7% (1st)	15.8% (1st)
28	June 15, 2018	17.2%	13.4%	14.5% (1st)	12.7% (1st)
29	June 18, 2018	13.4%	9.6%	12.0% (3rd)	11.2% (4th)
30	June 19, 2018	18.7%	14.5%	16.1% (1st)	14.9% (1st)
31	June 20, 2018	16.6%	12.3%	15.4% (1st)	14.1% (1st)
32	June 21, 2018	18.4%	14.0%	15.3% (1st)	13.9% (1st)
33	June 22, 2018	17.6%	13.2%	15.5% (1st)	14.4% (1st)
34	June 25, 2018	18.8%	15.0%	15.5% (1st)	13.7% (2nd)
35	June 26, 2018	19.7%	15.5%	17.4% (1st)	16.2% (1st)
36	June 27, 2018	17.4%	13.6%	16.1% (1st)	15.2% (2nd)
37	June 28, 2018	19.4%	15.1%	16.4% (1st)	15.2% (1st)
38	June 29, 2018	17.7%	13.8%	14.9% (2nd)	13.6% (2nd)
39	July 2, 2018	18.2%	14.3%	16.9% (1st)	15.0% (1st)
40	July 3, 2018	18.0%	14.1%	16.4% (1st)	14.7% (1st)
41	July 4, 2018	16.9%	13.4%	15.2% (1st)	13.7% (1st)
42	July 5, 2018	18.4%	14.9%	16.6% (1st)	15.1% (1st)
43	July 6, 2018	16.4%	12.6%	15.3% (1st)	13.5% (1st)
44	July 9, 2018	19.2%	15.4%	17.5% (1st)	15.8% (1st)
45	July 10, 2018	18.1%	14.7%	16.3% (1st)	14.9% (1st)
46	July 11, 2018	18.0%	14.2%	15.0% (1st)	13.1% (1st)
47	July 12, 2018	18.4%	14.5%	16.0% (1st)	14.1% (1st)
48	July 13, 2018	16.9%	12.6%	15.7% (1st)	14.4% (1st)
49	July 16, 2018	18.9%	15.2%	16.4% (1st)	15.7% (1st)
50	July 17, 2018	17.2%	13.1%	16.6% (1st)	15.6% (1st)
51	July 18, 2018	17.4%	13.3%	15.8% (1st)	14.8% (1st)
52	July 19, 2018	17.8%	13.6%	16.0% (1st)	14.8% (1st)
53	July 20, 2018	15.9%	11.8%	14.7% (1st)	13.7% (1st)
54	July 23, 2018	18.8%	15.3%	15.9% (2nd)	14.4% (2nd)
55	July 24, 2018	15.4%	11.5%	14.6% (1st)	13.7% (2nd)
56	July 25, 2018	16.9%	13.1%	15.6% (1st)	14.8% (1st)
57	July 26, 2018	18.0%	14.3%	16.1% (1st)	15.2% (1st)
58	July 27, 2018	16.2%	12.7%	14.3% (1st)	12.8% (1st)
59	July 30, 2018	18.2%	14.6%	15.5% (1st)	14.1% (1st)
60	July 31, 2018	15.5%	11.1%	14.7% (1st)	14.3% (1st)
61	August 1, 2018	16.4%	12.0%	15.4% (1st)	14.1% (1st)
62	August 2, 2018	16.6%	12.2%	14.6% (1st)	13.3% (1st)
63	August 3, 2018	16.1%	11.8%	15.4% (1st)	14.1% (1st)
64	August 6, 2018	17.0%	13.2%	17.3% (1st)	16.5% (1st)
65	August 7, 2018	17.1%	13.5%	15.9% (1st)	14.3% (1st)
66	August 8, 2018	16.5%	12.7%	15.9% (1st)	15.1% (1st)
67	August 9, 2018	18.7%	15.2%	16.7% (1st)	15.3% (1st)
68	August 10, 2018	16.6%	13.0%	15.7% (1st)	14.1% (1st)
69	August 13, 2018	17.8%	14.3%	16.4% (1st)	15.0% (1st)
70	August 14, 2018	17.0%	13.7%	15.2% (1st)	13.9% (1st)
71	August 15, 2018	16.3%	12.1%	16.2% (1st)	15.0% (1st)
72	August 16, 2018	18.5%	14.8%	16.2% (1st)	14.5% (1st)
73	August 17, 2018	17.6%	13.3%	16.0% (1st)	14.7% (1st)
74	August 21, 2018 (Note: No episodes were aired on August 20, 22, 23, and 31 due to coverage of the 2018 Asian Games.)	14.7%	10.9%	14.6% (2nd)	13.8% (2nd)
75	August 24, 2018	13.8%	10.0%	13.6% (2nd)	12.4% (3rd)
76	August 27, 2018	12.1%	8.3%	11.9% (3rd)	10.7% (3rd)
77	August 28, 2018	17.4%	13.0%	16.3% (1st)	14.9% (1st)
78	August 29, 2018	15.2%	11.5%	14.3% (2nd)	13.6% (3rd)
79	August 30, 2018	17.8%	13.4%	16.6% (1st)	15.1% (1st)
80	September 3, 2018	20.3%	—N/a	17.6% (1st)	15.9% (1st)
81	September 4, 2018	18.8%	—N/a	17.6% (1st)	16.1% (1st)
82	September 5, 2018	18.2%	—N/a	17.4% (1st)	16.0% (1st)
83	September 6, 2018	19.3%	—N/a	18.3% (1st)	16.4% (1st)
84	September 7, 2018	17.7%	—N/a	15.9% (1st)	13.4% (3rd)
85	September 10, 2018	17.8%	—N/a	18.3% (1st)	16.8% (1st)
86	September 11, 2018	15.7%	—N/a	14.8% (2nd)	13.0% (2nd)
87	September 12, 2018	—N/a	—N/a	18.0% (1st)	16.2% (1st)
88	September 13, 2018	18.8%	—N/a	17.6% (1st)	15.2% (1st)
89	September 14, 2018	—N/a	—N/a	18.1% (1st)	16.6% (1st)
90	September 17, 2018	20.5%	—N/a	18.6% (1st)	16.4% (1st)
91	September 20, 2018 (Note: No episodes were aired on September 18 and 19 due to news coverage of the 3rd Inter-Korean Summit.)	16.7%	—N/a	15.5% (1st)	13.9% (1st)
92	September 21, 2018	18.4%	—N/a	18.0% (1st)	16.2% (1st)
93	September 24, 2018	14.1%	—N/a	13.6% (1st)	12.5% (1st)
94	September 25, 2018	15.9%	—N/a	15.1% (1st)	13.3% (1st)
95	September 26, 2018	20.8%	—N/a	19.3% (1st)	18.1% (1st)
96	September 27, 2018	20.8%	—N/a	19.4% (1st)	17.6% (1st)
97	September 28, 2018	19.1%	—N/a	18.3% (1st)	17.6% (1st)
98	October 2, 2018 (Note: No episode was aired on October 1 due to the broadcast of an Armed Forces Day special.)	20.2%	—N/a	18.6% (1st)	16.5% (1st)
99	October 3, 2018	—N/a	—N/a	19.5% (1st)	17.4% (1st)
100	October 4, 2018	—N/a	—N/a	19.1% (1st)	16.9% (1st)
101	October 5, 2018	—N/a	—N/a	20.1% (1st)	17.7% (1st)
102	October 8, 2018	21.7%	—N/a	19.6% (1st)	17.8% (1st)
103	October 9, 2018	21.9%	—N/a	19.3% (1st)	17.1% (1st)
104	October 10, 2018	21.3%	—N/a	19.4% (1st)	17.5% (1st)
105	October 11, 2018	22.5%	—N/a	19.5% (1st)	17.3% (1st)
106	October 12, 2018	19.9%	—N/a	18.0% (1st)	16.0% (1st)
107	October 15, 2018	22.7%	—N/a	19.9% (1st)	17.5% (1st)
108	October 16, 2018	20.6%	—N/a	19.2% (1st)	17.0% (1st)
109	October 17, 2018	22.0%	—N/a	19.1% (1st)	17.5% (1st)
110	October 18, 2018	22.5%	—N/a	21.0% (1st)	19.5% (1st)
111	October 19, 2018	21.5%	—N/a	19.2% (1st)	17.4% (1st)
112	October 22, 2018	23.8%	—N/a	20.7% (1st)	19.1% (1st)
113	October 23, 2018	23.8%	—N/a	21.6% (1st)	20.3% (1st)
114	October 24, 2018	23.3%	—N/a	21.9% (1st)	20.3% (1st)
115	October 25, 2018	25.9%	—N/a	22.5% (1st)	20.7% (1st)
116	October 26, 2018	24.1%	—N/a	22.1% (1st)	20.6% (1st)
117	October 29, 2018	25.2%	—N/a	23.3% (1st)	21.1% (1st)
118	October 30, 2018	24.1%	—N/a	22.2% (1st)	20.2% (1st)
119	October 31, 2018	23.3%	—N/a	21.8% (1st)	20.4% (1st)
120	November 1, 2018	25.5%	—N/a	24.1% (1st)	22.3% (1st)
121	November 2, 2018	23.2%	—N/a	22.0% (1st)	21.2% (1st)
Average		-	-	16.8%	15.4%

== Awards and nominations ==
Year	Award	Category	Recipient	Result	Ref.
2018	2018 KBS Drama Awards	Best Supporting Actress	Ji Soo-won	Nominated	
2018	2018 KBS Drama Awards	Best New Actor	Jin Ju-hyung	Nominated	
2018	2018 KBS Drama Awards	Best New Actress	Seol In-ah	Won	
2019	55th Baeksang Arts Awards	Best New Actress	Seol In-ah	Nominated	
