= Foreign Legal Consultant =

Foreign Legal Consultants (Korean: 외국법자문사; Japanese, Chinese: 外国法事務弁護士) are lawyers from foreign countries licensed to practice law in South Korea.

== Qualification ==
Before becoming a Foreign Legal Consultant, a lawyer must:

- be admitted to the bar in a foreign jurisdiction,
- have at least three years of experience practicing law in that jurisdiction (one year of which may be spent working in South Korea), and
- show that reciprocity exists with their home jurisdiction, i.e. that a Japanese attorney could become similarly qualified to practice there (this condition is waived for lawyers admitted in WTO member states).

== See also ==
- Attorney at foreign law
