= Lee Si-hoo =

South Korean actor

- Born: 6 December 1992 (age 33); Gyeonggi, South Korea
- Other name: Lee Shi-hoo
- Education: Dankook University (Department of Theater and Cinema)
- Occupations: Actor; model
- Years active: 2007–present
- Agent: Gilstory ENT
- Known for: Through the Waves; Left-Handed Wife; Joseon Attorney

Lee Si-hoo is a South Korean actor and model. He is known for his roles in dramas such as Hi! School: Love On, Through the Waves, Lair Game, Left-Handed Wife and Joseon Attorney.

== Filmography ==
=== Television series ===
Year	Title	Role	Ref.
2007	The King and I	Eunuch	
2013	I Can Hear Your Voice	Student	
2014	Hi! School: Love On	Go Cheon-shik	
2014	Lair Game	Choi Sung-jeon	
2015	The Family is Coming	Choi Jong-tae	
2015	Shine or Go Crazy	Si-hoo	
2018	Through the Waves	Oh Jung-woo	
2018	When Time Stopped	Choi In-sup	
2018	The Third Charm	Baek Joo-ran's blind date	
2019	Left-Handed Wife	Bong Sun-dal	
2023	Joseon Attorney	Choi Yoon	

=== Web series ===
Year	Title	Role	Ref.
2019	Love Playlist Season 4	Si-hoo	
2024	Begins ≠ Youth	Thug	

=== Film ===
Year	Title	Role	Ref.
2013	Stalker	Si-hoo	
2014	I'm Horny Now!	Choon-gil	
2017	Don't Worry	Hyeon-joon	
2022	King of Prison	Newcomer	

=== Music video appearances ===
Year	Title	Artist	Length	Ref.
2018	"Fine"	Min Se-young	3:00	
2023	"What You Want to See Is Natural"	Shin Ye-young	4:00	
