= Milbank =

International corporate law firm

Milbank LLP
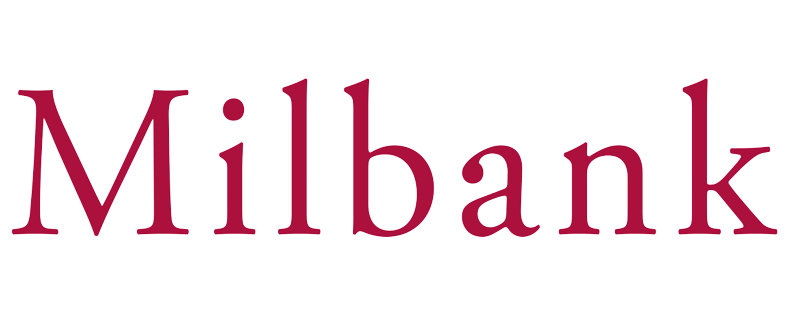
- Headquarters: 55 Hudson Yards; New York City
- No. of offices: 11
- No. of attorneys: 912 (2024)
- Major practice areas: General practice
- Key people: Scott A. Edelman; Chairman
- Revenue: US$1.2 billion (2020)
- Date founded: 1866
- Company type: Limited liability partnership
- Website: Official website

Milbank LLP is an American multinational, white-shoe law firm headquartered in New York City. It also has offices in Washington, D.C., Los Angeles, London, Frankfurt, Munich, Tokyo, Hong Kong, São Paulo, Seoul, and Singapore.

== History ==
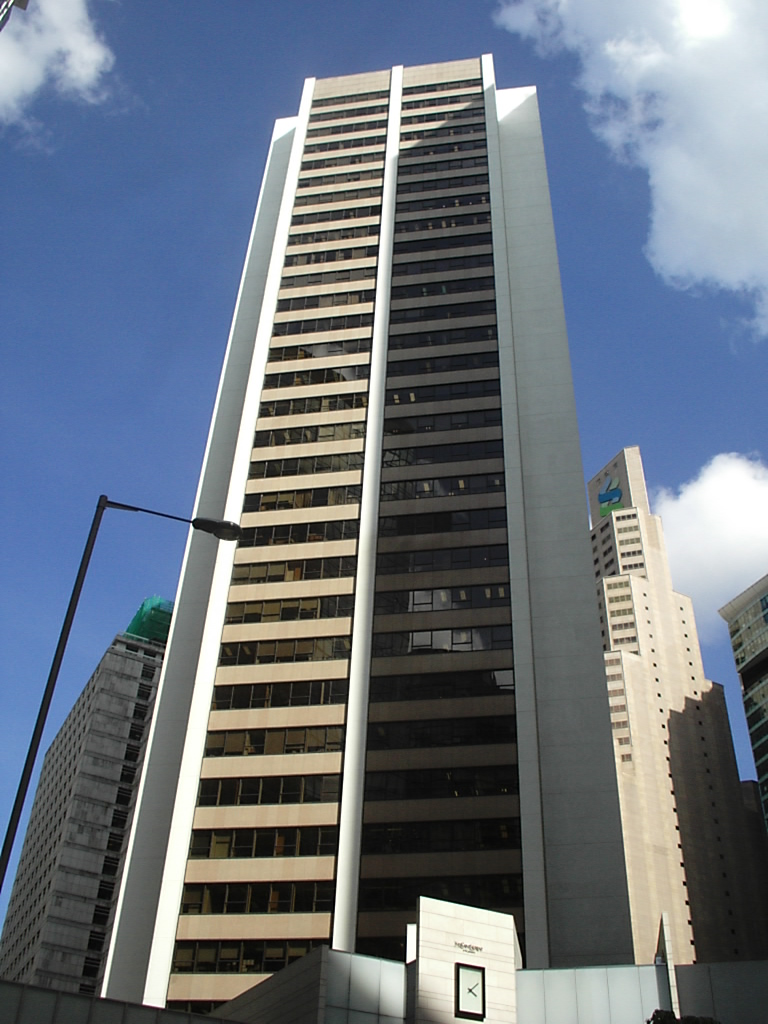
30/F, Alexandra House, Hong Kong

Milbank's origins trace back to 1866, with the inception of the original firm, Anderson, Adams & Young. In April 1929, Murray & Aldrich merged with Webb, Patterson & Hadley to form Murray, Aldrich & Webb. In 1931, the firm merged with Masten & Nichols to become Milbank, Tweed, Hope & Webb. The name was changed in 1962 to Milbank, Tweed, Hadley & McCloy. For decades, the firm's main clients were the Rockefeller family and the Chase Manhattan Bank.

The firm was responsible for the legal work on the building of Rockefeller Center and, up until 2018, had offices located at One Chase Manhattan Plaza (28 Liberty, since 2015). After World War II the firm advised new commercial and industrial developments.

Milbank formed hedge funds and other investment vehicles for financial clients in the 1960s, 1970s and 1980s, and capitalized on the growth of international business, finance, and technology transactions in the 1990s. In the 21st century, Milbank has offices in financial centers, including London, Frankfurt, Munich, São Paulo, Seoul, Tokyo, Singapore, Hong Kong and Beijing, and in Los Angeles and Washington, D.C.

In 1977, Milbank became the first U.S. law firm to establish an office in Tokyo under its own name, amid opposition from both the Ministry of Justice and Japan Federation of Bar Associations, which viewed it as illegal for foreign lawyers to practice in Japan at that time. Despite these protests, Milbank's office remained open through the early 1980s, as then the only office of an American law firm in Japan. Restrictions on foreign law firms in Japan were later eased, with the introduction of the Special Measures Law Concerning the Handling of Legal Business by Foreign Lawyers in 1987.

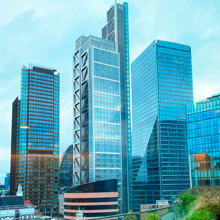
Milbank's London office, located at 100 Liverpool Street, City of London

In 1998, Milbank Partner John Gellene was convicted for knowingly and fraudulently making false declarations under penalty of perjury during the 1994 bankruptcy case of Bucyrus-Erie. Gellene was sentenced to prison time and Milbank was required to disgorge $1.8 million in related fees.

In early 2015, Milbank opened a Foreign Legal Consultant Office (FLCO) in Seoul.

On February 19, 2019, Milbank changed its name from Milbank, Tweed, Hadley & McCloy LLP to Milbank LLP.

In November 2023, wave of protests calling for a ceasefire in the Gaza war at elite U.S. law schools, Milbank was among a group of major law firms who sent a letter to top law school deans warning them that an escalation in incidents targeting Jewish students would have corporate hiring consequences.

Two months after the firm was joined by former acting U.S. solicitor general Neal Katyal, a critical legal opponent of Donald Trump; in April 2025, amid the Donald Trump administration's campaign of retaliation against law firms that provided services to his political opponents, Milbank agreed to contribute $100 million of pro bono legal services to causes endorsed by the Second Trump administration, in exchange for not being among the targets of Trump's executive orders. In July 2026, the Department of Justice subpoenaed Milbank in an investigation of the deal.

In early 2026, firm partner Katyal, successfully argued against tariffs in the second Trump administration as co-counsel in Learning Resources, Inc. v. Trump, in which the U.S. Supreme Court ruled that the 1977 International Emergency Economic Powers Act (IEEPA) did not grant the president the power to set tariffs, in its landmark decision. That February 26, Katyal announced a new legal task force on behalf of affected companies seeking tariff refunds.

== See also ==
- List of largest law firms by profits per partner
