= Hong Ah-reum =

South Korean actress (born 1989)

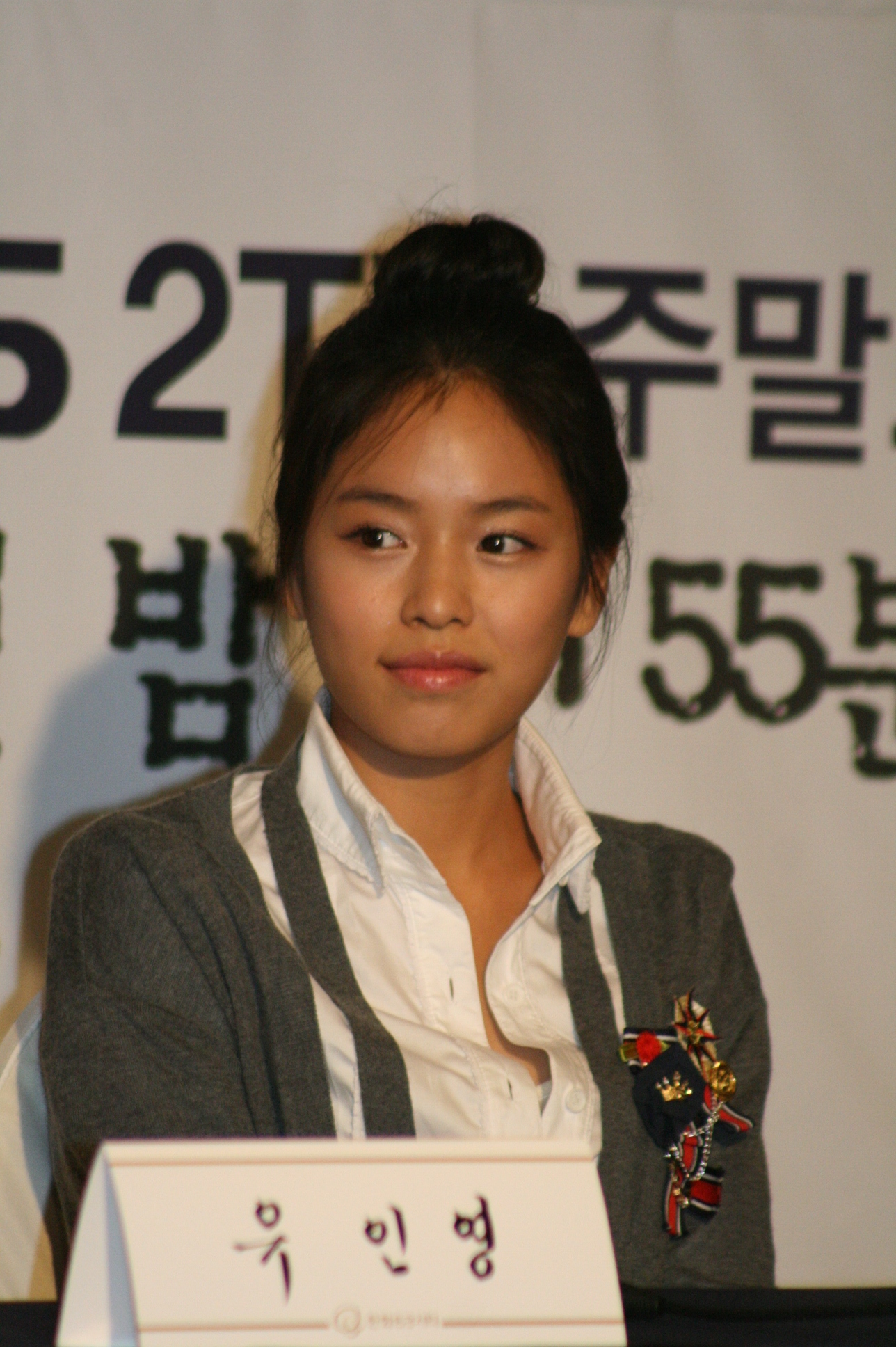
- Hong in 2008
- Born: March 28, 1989 (age 37); Seoul, South Korea
- Education: Seoul Institute of the Arts - Broadcasting and Entertainment
- Occupation: Actress
- Years active: 2006–present
- Agent: Urban Hills Company (어반힐스컴퍼니)

Korean name
- Hangul: 홍아름
- RR: Hong Areum
- MR: Hong Arŭm

Hong Ah-reum (Korean: 홍아름; born March 28, 1989) is a South Korean actress. Hong made her entertainment debut in 2006 through a MapleStory commercial, then launched her acting career. She has made herself known as one of the most familiar faces in Korean telenovela by headlining several titles of the genre such as A Bird That Doesn't Sing, and two of KBS TV Novel series Samsaengi and Dal Soon's Spring.

== Filmography ==
=== Television series ===
Year	Title	Role	Network
2007	In-soon Is Pretty	young Park In-soon	KBS2
2008	My Precious You	Kim Bo-ri	KBS2
2009	Dream	Song Yu-ri	SBS
2009	Reversal of Fate	Gong Young-hee/Gong Bok-soon	KBS2
2010	KBS Drama Special: "Rock, Rock, Rock"	Hyun-joo	KBS2
2012	God of War	Wol-ah/An-shim	MBC
2013	KBS TV Novel: "Samsaengi"	Seok Sam-saeng	KBS2
2013	Stranger	Yoon-hee	SBS
2014	Into the Flames	Ha Cheo-soon	TV Chosun
2014	Tears of Heaven	Yoon Cha-young	MBN
2014	4 Legendary Witches	Eun Bo-kyung	MBC
2015	A Bird That Doesn't Sing	Oh Ha-nui	tvN
2016	The Royal Gambler	Yeon-hwa	SBS
2017	KBS TV Novel – "Dal Soon's Spring"	Go Dal-soon / Han Eun-sol	KBS2
2018	Sunny Again Tomorrow	fake Han Soo-jung (character's real name Choi Yoo Ra)	KBS

=== Film ===
Year	Title	Role
2008	A Light Sleep	Soo-jin
2015	Makgeolli Girls / Moonshine Girls	Cho-rong
2016	Daddy's Back	Ae-sook
2017	One Step	Ji-won

=== Music video appearances ===
Year	Song title	Artist
2007	"Until You Come Back"	F.T. Island
2008	"Goodbye to Romance"	MC the Max
2014	"I Wish"	Gavy NJ

== Awards and nominations ==
Year	Award	Category	Nominated work	Result
2007	KBS Drama Awards	Best Young Actress	In-soon Is Pretty	Nominated
2008	KBS Drama Awards	Best New Actress	My Precious You	Nominated
2009	45th Baeksang Arts Awards	Best New Actress (TV)	My Precious You	Nominated
2012	MBC Drama Awards	Excellence Award, Actress in a Serial Drama	God of War	Nominated
2013	KBS Drama Awards	Excellence Award, Actress in a Daily Drama	Samsaengi	Nominated
2015	52nd Grand Bell Awards	Best New Actress	Makgeolli Girls / Moonshine Girls	Nominated
