= A Bird That Doesn't Sing =

2015 South Korean television series

- Promotional poster
- Hangul: 울지 않는 새
- RR: Ulji anneun sae
- MR: Ulji annŭn sae
- Genre: Revenge; Melodrama; Soap opera
- Created by: Jinnie Choi; Park Ji-young
- Written by: Yeo Jung-mi
- Directed by: Kim Pyung-jung
- Starring: Oh Hyun-kyung; Hong Ah-reum; Kang Ji-sub; Kim Yu-seok; Baek Seung-hee; Ahn Jae-min
- Composer: Yang Young-hak
- Country of origin: South Korea
- Original language: Korean
- No. of episodes: 100

Production
- Executive producers: Goo Bon-geun; Kim Yang; Lee Chan-ho
- Producers: Seo Yong-il; So Jae-hyun
- Production location: South Korea
- Running time: 40 minutes
- Production company: Story Plant (Note: Now Mega Monster, a joint venture of kakao M and Studio Dragon)

Original release
- Network: tvN
- Release: May 4, 2015 – January 1, 2016

A Bird That Doesn't Sing (Korean: 울지 않는 새; lit. 'Birds Don't Cry') is a 2015 South Korean television series starring Oh Hyun-kyung, Hong Ah-reum, Kang Ji-sub, Kim Yu-seok, Baek Seung-hee, and Ahn Jae-min. It aired on tvN, premiering on May 4, 2015 on Mondays to Thursdays at 21:40 (KST).

== Synopsis ==
A 10 billion won insurance murder case causes Oh Ha-nui (Hong Ah-reum) to lose everything. She sets out to take revenge upon Chun Mi-ja (Oh Hyun-kyung) who caused her misfortune.

== Cast ==
=== Main ===
- Oh Hyun-kyung as Chun Mi-ja
- Hong Ah-reum as Oh Ha-ni
- Kang Ji-sub as Park Sung-soo
- Kim Yu-seok as Oh Nam-kyu
- Baek Seung-hee as Oh Yoo-mi
- Ahn Jae-min as Lee Tae-hyun

=== Supporting ===
- Baek Seung-hoon as Chun Soo-chang
- Jang Do-yoon as Oh Min-ki
  - Jung Yoon-seok as young Oh Min-ki (special appearance)
- Han Seo-jin as Oh Min-ji
- Kang Kyung-hun as Jo Dal-yun
- Lee Kyung-shim as Hong Soo-yun
- Park Hye-jin as Han Yeo-sa
- Han Ga-rim as Seo Bong-sook
- Choi Sang-hoon as Park Eui-won
- Chang Hee-soo as Jo Hye-won
- Joo Min-ha as Park Sung-hee
- Kim Gye-sun as Woong-yi's mother
- Choi Su-rin as Min Ha-kyung
- Cha Seung-yun as Min Hae-kyung
- Lee Jung-hoon as Ha-ni's father
- Jang Hee-soo
- Lee Jong-goo
