= Kim Seo-an =

South Korean actress (born 1998)

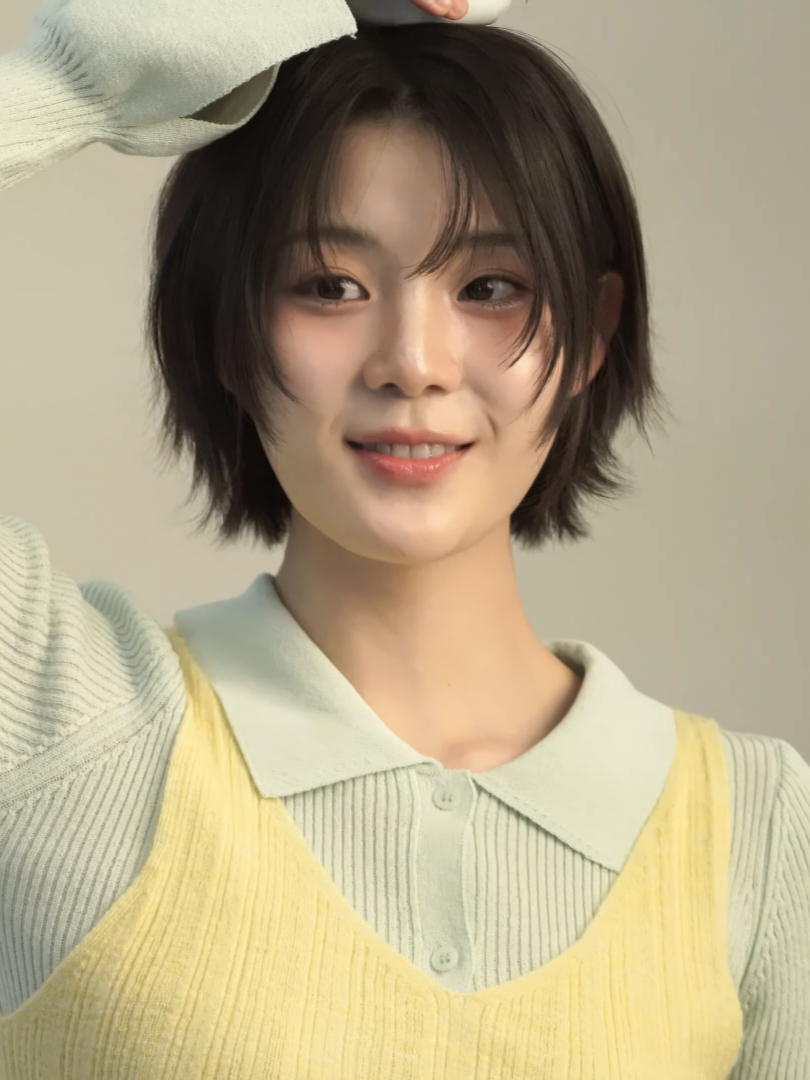
- Kim in June 2026
- Born: Kim Min-ah; July 12, 1998 (age 28); Seoul, South Korea
- Other name: Kim Min-ah
- Education: Sungshin Women's University (Department of Media and Visual Acting)
- Occupation: Actress
- Years active: 2018–present
- Agent: Vast Entertainment

Kim Seo-an (Korean: 김서안) is a South Korean actress. She is best known for her roles in dramas such as Miss Independent Ji-eun 2, Ending Again and The World of My 17.

== Filmography ==
=== Television series ===
| Year | Title | Role | Ref. |
|---|---|---|---|
| 2019 | Love Vlog | Jeong Mi-so | |
| 2019 | Ghost VRos | Seo-an | |
| 2019 | Miss Independent Ji-eun 2 | Mina | |
| 2020 | Ending Again | So Hye-go | |
| 2020 | The World of My 17 | Kim Soo-bin | |
| 2020 | Someway | Hyun Jae-hee | |
| 2021 | Bossam: Steal the Fate | Princess Jeongmyeong | |
| 2021 | Me and My Grantopia | Da-hye | |
| 2022 | Life of a Former Bully | Min Chae-rin | |
| 2022 | A Film About Grooming | Min Chae-rin | |
| 2023 | My Dearest | Young-rang | |
| 2023 | My Dearest Part 2 | Young-rang | |
| 2024 | Chief Detective 1958 | Geum-ok | |

=== Film ===
| Year | Title | Role | Ref. |
|---|---|---|---|
| 2021 | Hangsang, Gakkeum | Ji-an | |
