= Jin Ju-hyung =

South Korean actor

- Born: November 24, 1994 (age 31); Seoul, South Korea
- Occupation: Actor
- Years active: 2013–present
- Agent: EL Park

Korean name
- Hangul: 진주형
- RR: Jin Juhyeong
- MR: Chin Chuhyŏng

Jin Ju-hyung (born Kim Jin-tae on November 24, 1994) is a South Korean actor. He rose to fame playing the leading role of Lee Han-kyul in the drama series Sunny Again Tomorrow (2018), and has roles in Suspicious Partner (2017).

== Career ==
=== 2013–2016: Beginnings ===
Jin started acting in 2013 where he played as Detective Goo in Scandal: A Shocking and Wrongful Incident. His second role came in 2014 in blade man and several roles in 2016.

=== 2018–present: First lead role ===
Jin got his first lead role playing as Lee Han-kyul in 2018 Sunny Again Tomorrow.

== Filmography ==
=== Film ===
Year	Title	Role	Notes
2017	You With Me	Rintaro	A Korean-Filipino Film

=== Television series ===
Year	Title	Role	Notes/Ref.
2013	The Scandal	Detective Goo	
2014	Blade Man	Jung Joon	
2016	Cinderella with Four Knights	Jun-su	
2016	Hwarang: The Poet Warrior Youth	Jang Hyun	
2017	Suspicious Partner	Go Chan-ho	
2017	Live Up to Your Name		
2018	Sunny Again Tomorrow	Lee Han-kyul	Lead Role
2023	Meant To Be	Moon Do-hyun	
2024	Snow White's Revenge	Kim Seok-gi	

=== Music video appearances ===
Year	Song title	Artist	Ref.
2018	"Mời Anh Vào Team (❤️) Em"	Chi Pu	

== Awards and nominations ==
Year	Award	Category	Nominated work	Result	Ref.
2018	3rd Asia Artist Awards	Focus Award	—N/a	Won	
2018	KBS Drama Awards	Best New Actor	Sunny Again Tomorrow	Nominated	
2023	MBC Drama Awards	Excellence Award, Actor in a Daily Drama	Meant To Be	Nominated	
