= Sorry Not Sorry (TV series) =

2024–2025 South Korean television series

- Promotional poster
- Hangul: 오늘도 지송합니다
- Lit.: Sorry For Today As Well
- RR: Oneuldo jisonghamnida
- MR: Onŭldo chisonghamnida
- Genre: Romantic comedy
- Written by: Choi Ryung; Jo Yoo-jin; Min Ji-young
- Directed by: Min Ji-young
- Starring: Jeon So-min; Gong Min-jeung; Jang Hee-ryung; Choi Daniel; Kim Mu-jun
- Music by: Jeong Seung-hyeon
- Country of origin: South Korea
- Original language: Korean
- No. of episodes: 12

Production
- Executive producer: Kim Mi-kyun
- Producer: Shim So-hee
- Running time: 60 minutes
- Production company: Whynot Media

Original release
- Network: KBS Joy
- Release: December 5, 2024 – February 27, 2025

Sorry Not Sorry (Korean: 오늘도 지송합니다) is a 2024 South Korean romantic comedy television series, starring Jeon So-min, Gong Min-jeung, Jang Hee-ryung, Choi Daniel, and Kim Mu-jun. It aired on KBS Joy from December 5, 2024, to February 27, 2025, every Thursday at 21:00 (KST).

== Synopsis ==
Ji Song-yi finds her life taking a drastic turn following a broken engagement. She works many part-time jobs while attempting to adjust to life in a new place while struggling to pay off the mortgage on her newlywed house.

== Cast ==
Main

- Jeon So-min as Ji Song-yi
- Gong Min-jeung as Choi Ha-na
- Jang Hee-ryung as Ahn Chan-yang
- Choi Daniel as Cha Hyun-woo
- Kim Mu-jun as Kim Yi-an

Supporting

- Kwon Hyuk as Seok Jin-ho
- Joo Ah-reum as Ji Eun-gyoo
- Yoon Ye-hee as Park Mi-ran
- Woo Kang-min as Bae Seong-tae
- Lee Yoon-gun as Ji Pal-wook
- Yeom Ji-young
- Soy

== Ratings ==
Average TV viewership ratings
Ep.	Original broadcast date	Average audience share (Nielsen Korea)
Ep.	Original broadcast date	Nationwide
1	December 5, 2024	0.3% (86th)
2	December 12, 2024	0.4% (81st)
3	December 19, 2024	0.4% (63rd)
4	December 26, 2024	0.3% (105th)
5	January 9, 2025	0.5% (81st)
6	January 16, 2025	0.3% (104th)
7	January 23, 2025	0.3% (74th)
8	January 30, 2025	0.5% (79th)
9	February 6, 2025	0.3% (83rd)
10	February 13, 2025	0.3% (81st)
11	February 20, 2025	0.4% (47th)
12	February 27, 2025	0.4% (58th)
Average		0.37%
In the table above, the blue numbers represent the lowest ratings and the red numbers represent the highest ratings.; This series aired on a cable channel/pay TV which normally has a relatively smaller audience compared to free-to-air TV/public broadcasters (KBS, SBS, MBC and EBS).
