= Litigation master =

Legal occupation in pre-modern China

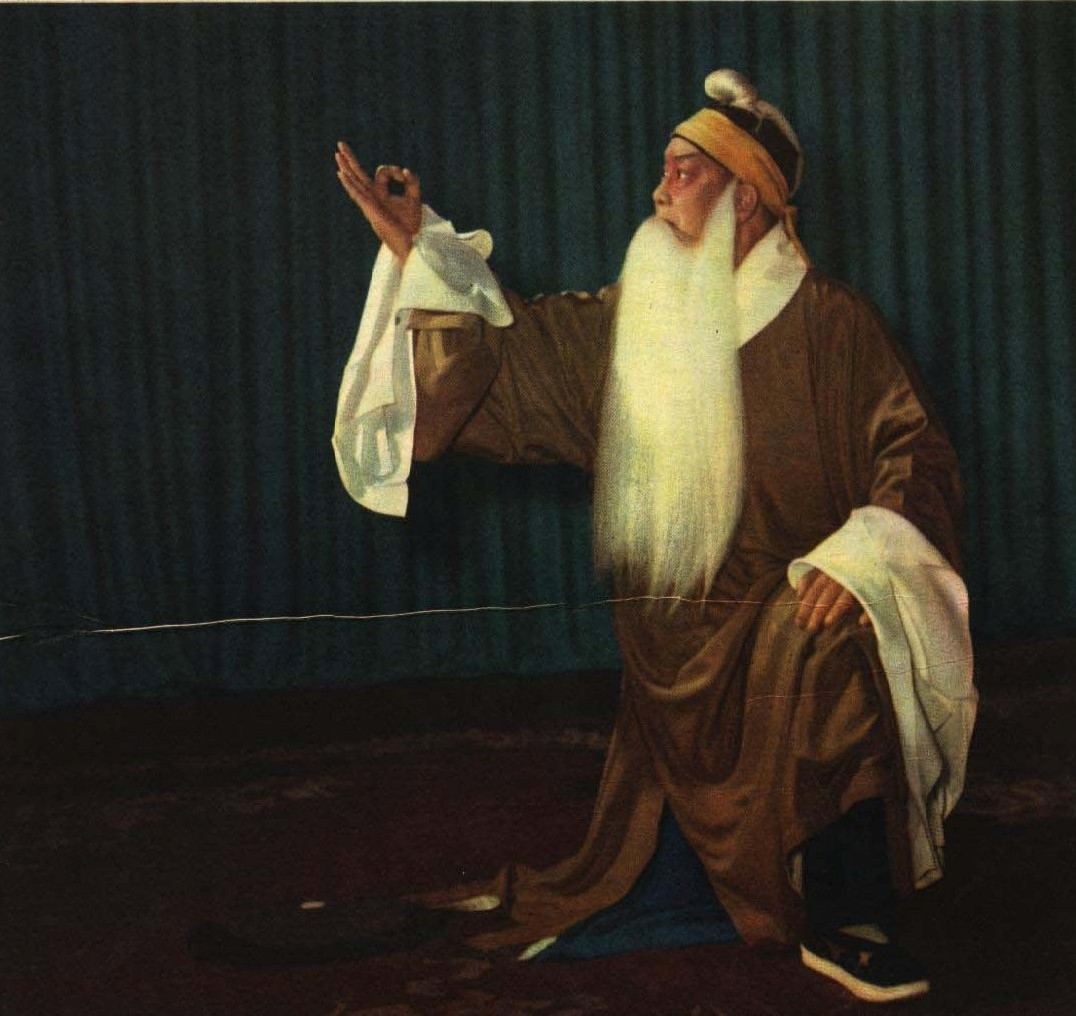
Zhou Xinfang as the litigation master Song Shijie in the opera Four Scholars.

A litigation master or sòngshī (訟師) was a person who supported lawsuits by common people in pre-modern China. Litigation masters did not engage in courtroom advocacy. Instead, they made a living by writing legal documents for ordinary people with low literacy skills, as well as by receiving settlement money from the other party. Unlike modern lawyers, their profession was not recognized by the state. Litigation masters were frequently blamed for inciting litigation and the practice of the profession was at times outlawed.

In popular literature litigation masters were often portrayed as defenders of the wronged and vulnerable. Some leaders of rebellions were also litigation masters.

== Names ==
Litigation masters were known by various terms that have been translated into English in various ways. The "litigation master" title is also sometimes translated as "shyster", "pettifogger", or "cunning specialist in litigation". They were also sometimes referred to by government officials as "litigation hooligans" or "litigation tricksters" (sònggùn). Because much of their work involved preparing complaints and rebuttals, another term used was "plaint master" (zhuàngshī).

== History ==
The practice of litigation mastery is sometimes traced to Deng Xi of the state of Zheng in the 6th century BCE, who charged fees for legal advice and provided training on litigation strategy. However, "litigation masters" by that name first emerge in historical records during the Song dynasty and continuing into the 20th century Republic of China.

Attitudes toward litigation masters by the state varied through history. In the Song period they were viewed with contempt, while attitudes relaxed somewhat under the Yuan dynasty. In the early Ming dynasty they were heavily repressed, but a 1503 statute provided that while false accusations were subject to punishment, the act of helping common people with their complaints was not.

Litigation masters were again heavily repressed under the Qing dynasty. Substatutes criminalizing the act of preparing a complaint for another were promulgated in 1725 and 1764. However, the practice continued, and the numbers of practicing litigation masters at any given time in the 18th and 19th centuries in China has been estimated at between 1,700 and 2,000, or roughly one per yamen on average.

Litigation masters were one of several groups of legal specialists in Qing dynasty China, along with judicial officials and private legal advisors to local magistrates. The existence of these groups of legal professionals helped to pave the way for the introduction of modern lawyers in the 19th and 20th centuries.

== Practice ==
The core of the litigation masters' practice was the preparation of complaints and rebuttals to present before local magistrates. Litigation masters also often acted as fixers, bribing yamen clerks and runners. Bribery was a fixture of litigation in Ming and Qing dynasty China, and was required at every step of the litigation process.

Because the profession was stigmatized and at times forbidden by the government, litigation masters had few opportunities for training. Typically they learned the trade by studying outlawed handbooks for litigation masters, known as songshi miben or "secret pettifogger handbooks". These handbooks were outlawed under the Qing dynasty in the 1740s but nonetheless circulated widely. The possession of such handbooks, along with case documents for use as templates, was often cited as evidence against those charged with habitually practicing as a litigation master.

Many of the people who became litigation masters were intellectuals who had failed in the imperial examinations or were unable to complete their studies.

== In art and literature ==
Although many portrayals cast them in a negative light, litigation masters are also often portrayed in literature as Robin Hood-like characters defending vulnerable people against the wealthy and powerful.

Litigation masters appear in various works of classical Chinese literature. In the classic 18th-century novel Dream of the Red Chamber, the family hires a litigation master to obtain a reduced sentence for Xue Pan after he commits murder. The novel Four Famous Litigation Masters in the Qing Dynasty follows four litigation masters who all end up badly due to seeking to profit from the grievances of others, but does not cast them in an entirely negative light. The opera Four Scholars depicts a group of Ming dynasty litigation masters.

In the 21st century, litigation masters have appeared in Chinese historical dramas such as Under the Microscope. A litigation master was also the protagonist of the 1992 comedy film Justice, My Foot!

== See also ==
- Oejibu, corresponding occupation in Joseon Korea
- Kujishi, corresponding occupation in Edo Japan
- Traditional Chinese law
