= Lee Kyu-sung =

South Korean actor

- Born: 16 February 1992 (age 34); South Korea
- Other name: Lee Gyoo-seong
- Occupation: Actor
- Years active: 2010–present
- Agent: Prain Global
- Known for: When the Camellia Blooms; Touch Your Heart; Joseon Attorney

Lee Kyu-sung is a South Korean actor. He is known for his roles in dramas such as When the Camellia Blooms, Touch Your Heart, Youth of May, and Joseon Attorney.

== Filmography ==
=== Film ===
Year	Title	Role	Ref.
2010	Hahaha	Beggar	
2014	Thuy	Wan-soo	
2017	Midnight Runners	Police Academy Student	
2018	The Wrath	Buddhist Monk	
2018	Swing Kids	Man-cheol	
2021	Nobleman Ryu's Wedding	Moderator	
2021	Not Out	Min-cheol	
2021	Ground Zero	New Janitor	
2021	On the Line	Youngest of Voice	

=== Television series ===
Key
†	Denotes television productions that have not yet been released

Year	Title	Role	Ref.
2017	Strongest Deliveryman	Dan-ah's younger brother	
2018	Something in the Rain	Joon-hee's friend	
2018	Sketch	Ahn Kyung-tae	
2018	Life	Kyu-sung	
2019	Touch Your Heart	Kim Pil-gi	
2019	Loss Time Life	Min-hyung	
2019	When the Camellia Blooms	Park Heung-shik	
2020	It's Okay to Not Be Okay	Moon Sang-tae	
2020	The School Nurse Files	Student	
2020	School Strange Stories: 8th Anniversary	Ki Chul-min	
2021	Nobleman Ryu's Wedding	Moderator	
2021	My Roommate Is a Gumiho	Mountain Spirit Transformation	
2021	Youth of May	Jung Hye-gun	
2022	Hope or Dope	Heo Jung Tae	
2022	Why Her	So Hyeong-chil	
2023	Joseon Attorney	Dong-chi	
2023–2024	Gyeongseong Creature	Mori	
2024	The Midnight Romance in Hagwon	Park Ki-sung	
2024	Cinderella at 2 AM	Bae Jang-hee	
2026	Between Steps	Eom Tae-ho	
