= Kujishi =

A kujishi (公事師), sometimes translated as suit solicitor, was a person who assisted private citizens in litigation in Japan during the Edo period. The kujishi were also known as deirishi or kujikai ("lawsuit buyers").

The kujishi bore some similarities to modern lawyers, but unlike lawyers, they were not authorized by the state, received no standard training, and did not represent their clients in court. Their role was closer to that of a fixer or a litigation master of pre-modern China. They were frequently accused of bribery and swindling and were generally held in low social esteem. Their portrayal in popular literature was overwhelmingly negative.

== Background ==
The sale of legal advice in Japan dates to at least the Kamakura period, but the rise of the Tokugawa shogunate led to both increased demand for such services and increased efforts by the state to control or curtail them. The role of the kujishi was closely related to that of the kujiyado ("litigation inns"), which emerged in the 1600s and provided lodgings for litigants in the major government centers. The kujiyado were had an authorized monopoly that required litigants to stay at them and register their location with the magistrate. In 1699, kujiyado in Tokyo, Osaka, and Kyoto organized a guild that obtained a partial, heritable monopoly; by the 18th century there were four such guilds. The number of such inns in Tokyo alone was approximately 100.

The relationship between the authorized kujiyado and unauthorized kujishi is not entirely clear; some authorities treat them as synonymous. The staff of the kujiyado were permitted to appear to assist their clients at hearings before the magistrate, while the kujishi were not; however, it is likely that many kujishi did in fact appear at hearings in the guise of village officials.

== Practice ==
Some kujishi only provided the services of a scrivener, such as instructing a litigant on the necessary procedural methods and litigation techniques, or preparing necessary documents on a litigant's behalf. However, some kujishi also acted as mediators for settlement or facilitating bribes of officials. The shogunate prohibited the kujishi's activities, and on one occasion they were driven out of Tokyo by a mob, although this had little effect on their numbers.

== Legacy ==
When legal representation was finally allowed under the daigennin (代言人) system of the 1870s following the Meiji Restoration, the daigennin were sometimes perceived as simply kujishi by another name. The negative perception of the kujishi has sometimes been credited with delaying popular acceptance of a Western-style system of legal representation in Japan.

The relationship of kujishi to modern lawyers has been disputed. Many 20th-century historians averred that pre-modern Japan had no lawyers at all, and that the kujishi were not analogous to lawyers. They accordingly received little attention from international scholarship; until the 1950s, the only non-Japanese source discussing the kujishi was John Henry Wigmore's Panorama of the World's Legal Systems.
