= Meant to Be (South Korean TV series) =

2023 South Korean television series

- Promotional poster
- Hangul: 하늘의 인연
- RR: Haneurui inyeon
- MR: Hanŭrŭi inyŏn
- Genre: Melodrama; Revenge; Family; Romance
- Developed by: Jang Jae-hoon
- Written by: Yeo Yeong-mi
- Directed by: Kim Jin-hyung
- Starring: Kim Yu-seok; Jong Hye-yeon; Seo Han-gyeol; Jung Woo-seon; Jin Joo-hyung; Ko Eun-mi
- Music by: Ma Sang-woo
- Country of origin: South Korea
- Original language: Korean
- No. of episodes: 120

Production
- Producers: Baek Ho-min; Kim Seo-gon
- Running time: 30–35 minutes
- Production company: MBC C&I

Original release
- Network: MBC TV
- Release: April 17 – October 20, 2023

Meant to Be (Korean: 하늘의 인연) is a 2023 South Korean television series starring Kim Yu-seok, Jong Hye-yeon, Seo Han-gyeol, Jung Woo-yeon, Jin Joo-hyung and Go Eun-mi. It premiered on MBC TV on April 17, 2023, and aired every Monday to Friday at 19:05 (KST).

== Cast ==
=== Main ===
- Kim Yu-seok as Kang Chi-hwan

Hae-in's and Se-na's father.

- Jong Hye-yeon as Lee Hae-in / Yoon Sol

Soon-young and Chi-hwan's daughter.

- Seo Han-gyeol as Han Jin-woo

Yun-mo's son

- Jung Woo-yeon as Kang Se-na

Mi-kang's daughter.

- Jin Joo-hyung as Moon Do-hyeon

Hwa-sun's son.

=== Supporting ===
- Ko Eun-mi as Jeon Mi-kang
- Jo Eun-sook as Na Jeong-im
- Lee Hoon as Yoon I-chang
- Byeon Woo-min as Ha Yun-mo
- Jo Mi-ryeong as Chae Young-eun
- Shim Yi-young as Lee Soon-young

=== Special appearances ===
- Seo Ha-joon as Detective Lee
