= Hahm Eun-jung filmography =

Ham Eun-jung filmography
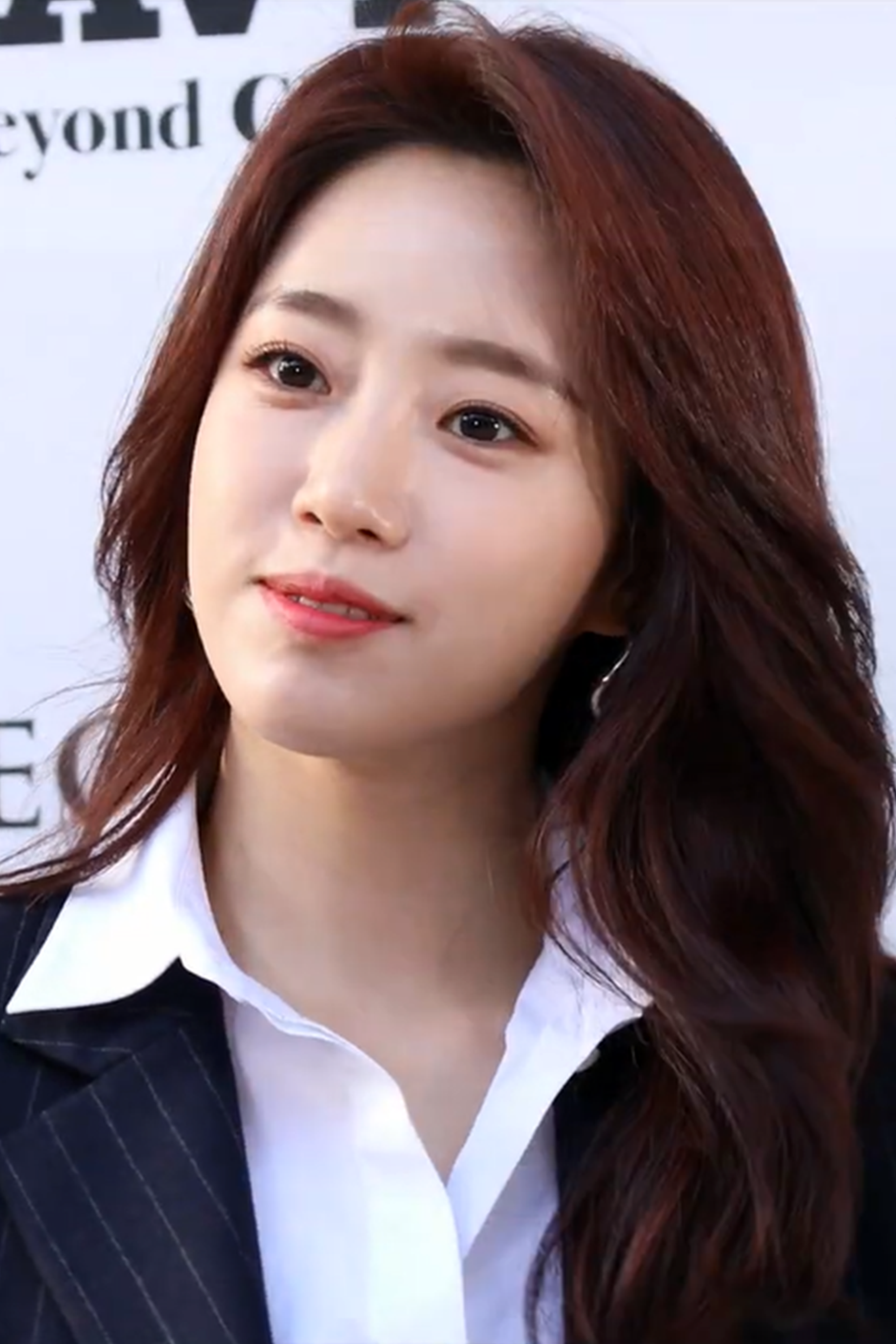
- Hahm in 2019
- Film: 17
- Television series: 33
- Web series: 4
- Television show: 34
- Web show: 3
- Hosting: 19
- Music videos: 20
- Advertising: 24

Hahm Eun-jung (known mononymously as Eunjung), is a South Korean singer and actress. She is a member of girl group T-ara and its subgroup T-ara N4. She began her career at the age of seven as an entertainer in 1995, when she won the Little Miss Korea competition and debuted as a child actress in the same year in a television drama A New Generation of Adults (1995). In 2012, Eun-jung became the first idol star to host the Korean remake of hit TV show Saturday Night Live. The episode drew a record-breaking nationwide rating of 1.444%, the show's all-time highest rating at the time. In 2017, Hahm became the first female idol to star in a Thai movie with Micro Love. In 2019, she made her first appearance in a Vietnamese reality show Bistro K as a guest.

Hahm has received numerous awards for her acting, including the Child Actor Award for her role in "Drama of The Year" multi-winner Land at the 2004 SBS Drama Awards. She was also nominated and won awards for comedies Coffee House (2010) and Dream High (2011), reality show We Got Married (2011–12), family drama Be My Dream Family (2021), daily soap opera Love Twist (2021–22), romance drama Suji & Uri (2024), and the thriller Queen's House (2025). (Note: KBS Drama Award for Excellence, Actor in a Daily Drama)

== Film ==
Year	Title	Role	Notes	Ref.
1999	A-rong's Big Expedition	Song-i		
2001	Dodge Go! Go!	Min Sang-mi	Japanese film	
2002	Madeleine	Sung-hae (young)		
2005	The Beast and the Beauty	Hae-mi		
2006	Ice Bar	Mi-sook		
2006	World of Silence	Min-hee		
2008	Death Bell	Kim Ji-won		
2009	Dating On Earth	Yun Yi-soo	Filmed in 2007	
2011	White: The Melody of the Curse	Choi Eun-joo		
2011	Ghastly	Extra	Cameo	
2017	Micro Love	Kim Min-jee	Thailand film	
2017	Missing 2	Sun-young		
2020	Nameless Sea	Eun-Jung	Short film	
2021	I Will Song	Mool Kyul	Independent film	
2023	Behind The Shadows	Cho Hee	TV Cinema Project	
2026	Ne Zha 2 (Korean Version)	Crana	Voice role	

== Television series ==
Year	Title	Role	Notes	Ref.
1995	A New Generation of Adults	Jessica	Main role; 1 episode	
2003	Sharp	Ye-rim's friend	Cameo	
2003	Long Live Affection	Student	Cameo	
2003	Youth Literature – "The Reason I Dropped Anchor"	Hyun-i	Television film	
2004	Little Women	Hyun-deuk (young)	Cameo	
2004	Age of Heroes	Layla	Cameo	
2004	Toji, the Land	Bong-soon (young)	Supporting role	
2005	Lovers in Prague	Yuri Choi	Cameo	
2005	Nonstop 6	Eun-jung	Cameo	
2005	Cute or Crazy		Cameo	
2005	Love Generation 5			
2005	Hello My Teacher	Hye-ju	Episode 16	
2006	Princess Hours	Eun-jeong	Episode 1	
2006	My Love	Jang Mi-ran (young)		
2006	Summer at Leica	Eul-hwa	Television film	
2007–2008	The King & I	Gil-nyeo	Cameo	
2010	Master of Study	Bad student	2 episodes	
2010	Coffee House	Kang Seung-yeon	Main role	
2011	Dream High	Yoon Baek-hee	Main role	
2011	The King of Legend	Jin Ah-yi	Supporting role	
2012	Insu, the Queen Mother	In-soo (young)	Main role	
2014	Endless Love	Tae Cho-ae	Supporting role	
2015	Love on a Rooftop	Min Chae-won	Supporting role	
2017	Sisters-in-Law	Hwang Eun-byul	Main role	
2018	Lovely Horribly	Shin Yoon-ah	Main role	
2021	Case Cell Division	An Do-na	Main role; Mini-series	
2021	Be My Dream Family	Han Da-bal	Supporting role	
2021–2022	Love Twist	Oh So-ri	Main role	
2022	Bloody Heart	Yoon Jung-jeon	Episode 1	
2023	Behind The Shadows	Cho Hee	Television film	
2024	Suji & Uri	Jin Soo-ji	Main role	
2025	Queen's House	Kang Jae-In	Main role	
2025–2026	The First Man	Oh Jang-mi / Ma Seo-rin	Main role / Protagonist / Antagonist	

== Web series ==
Year	Title	Role	Notes	Ref.
2010	Bubi Bubi	Eun-jung	Main role; miniseries	
2015	Sweet Temptation	Eun-jin	Main role; miniseries	
2019	I Hate You, Juliet!	Min Jae	Episode 12	
2024	Tarot	Eun-mi	Episode 7: "Couple Manager"	

== Television shows ==
Year	Title	Role	Notes	Ref.
2009	M!Countdown	Special host	K-Chart announcer	
2009–10	Star King	Recurring guest		
2010	M!Countdown	Special Host		
2010	Big Star X-Files	Main cast	Lunar New Year special program	
2011–12	We Got Married	Main cast	with Lee Jang-woo, 55 episodes	
2011	M!Countdown	Special Host	with Soyeon	
2011	Dream High Special Concert	Performer	Dream High special program	
2011	Star Couple Strongest Match	Main Cast	Chuseok special program	
2012	SNL Korea Season 2	Host	With Bada and Horan, EP.7	
2012	Music Bank	Special Host	With Lee Jang-woo	
2012	Hidden Singer	Judge	EP.16–17	
2013	Show Champion	Host	With Amber, 30 episodes	
2013	Immortal Songs	Contestant	With Hyomin, EP.133	
2013	Hidden Singer 2	Judge	EP.3	
2014	Show Champion	Special Host	EP.100	
2014	The Show	Special Host	February 8, 2014	
2014	Immortal Songs	Contestant	With Hyomin, EP. 137–138	
2014	Hidden Singer 3		EP.10	
2015	100 People, 100 Songs	Contestant		
2015	2015 Quiz On Korea (Note: Annual Quiz Show)	Host		
2015	M Countdown	Special Host		
2015	The Show	Host	May 12 to June 2	
2015	I'm Supermodel	Special Judge		
2016	Master of Driving Straight	Main cast	With Hyomin; 6 episodes	
2016	What Should I Do? (Note: Thai show)	Main cast		
2016	Idol Chef King (Note: Chuseok special program)	Main cast	2 episodes	
2017	Enchanted Lesson Birdie Birdie	Main cast		
2018	King of Mask Singer	Contestant	EP.137–138	
2019	Bistro K (Note: Korean - Vietnamese show)	Recurring guest	With Hari Won; EP. 5	
2020	Law of the Jungle	Cast member	EP.407–410	
2020	Love Intervention 3	Special Host	EP.49	
2021	Thanks Golf	Main cast		
2022	Crazy Season 3	Host		
2022	What's In My Bag? 4	Host	Episode 4	
2023	Differential Class	Main cast		
2023	Style Me 9	Host		
2023	Stars' Top Recipe at Fun-Staurant	Special Host	With Hanhae, 3 episodes	
2023	Music in The Trip	Main cast		
2023	Golf Star 3	Main cast		

== Web shows ==
Year	Title	Role	Notes	Ref.
2020	Jeju Island in Summer	Host	on HeyStars	
2020	Beauty & View	Host	on YouTube	
2025–Present	Hahm Eun-jung	Host	on YouTube	

== Hosting ==
Year	Title	Country	Notes	Ref.
2010	5th Seoul International Drama Awards	South Korea	With Kim Ji-Hoon	
2010	37th Korea Broadcasting Awards	South Korea	With Kim Kap-soo	
2011	46th MBC Music Festival	South Korea	With Gain, Jo Kwon and Nichkhun	
2011	6th Seoul International Drama Awards	South Korea	With Son Hyun-joo	
2012	Ulsan Summer Festival	South Korea		
2013	10th Jecheon International Music & Film Festival	South Korea	With Ju Ji-hoon	
2014	18th SBS Awards Festival	South Korea	With Jiyeon	
2014	Mnet Super Concert	South Korea		
2015	21st Dream Concert	South Korea	With Dasom and Hara	
2015	42nd Korea Broadcasting Awards	South Korea	With Kim Byung-man	
2016	M Countdown special concert	China	With Jiyeon	
2017	1st Seoul Awards	South Korea		
2018	2nd Soribada K-Music Awards	South Korea		
2018	Japan K-Girls Festival	Japan	With Yuji Kondo	
2020	56th Grand Bell Awards	South Korea		
2020	31th Chunsa International Film Festival Awards	South Korea		
2023	37th KBS Drama Awards	South Korea	With Baek Sung-hyun	
2025	Starry Night In Busan Concert	South Korea	Bando Cultural Foundation's 6th Anniversary	
2025	39th KBS Drama Awards	South Korea	With Baek Sung-hyun	
2026	11th Ulsan Ulju World Mountain Film Festival	South Korea		

== Music videos and appearances ==
Year	Song title	Artist	Ref.
As singer
2011	"Crazy4s"	Eunjung & Kim Soo Hyun	
2015	"I'm Good"	Eunjung	
2015	"I'm Good" (Original Ver.)	Eunjung	
2015	"Goodbye"	Eunjung	
2015	"Goodbye" (CHN Ver.)	Eunjung	
2019	"Desire" (JPN)	Eunjung	
2025	"Arigato" (JPN)	Eunjung	
As guest actress
2007	"Hatred"	SeeYa	
2007	"Prick"	SG Wannabe, KCM	
2007	"Love Sick"	FT Island	
2007	"Only One"	FT Island	
2010	"Time, Please Stop"	Davichi	
2010	"Page One"	SG Wannabe, Ok Joo Hyun	
2010	"I Want to Know Goodbye"	Hwang Ji Hyun	
2010	"Bbiribbom Bberibbom"	Coed School	
2011	"The Way I Am"	Xia	
2012	"I Know"	Yangpa, Soyeon, Park Boram	
2015	"Missing You"	Koh Na Young	
2015	"Missing You" (Chinese Ver.)	Koh Na Young	
2015	"My destiny"	ISU	

== Advertisements ==
Brand	Year	Promoting	Region	Notes	Ref.
Stepping Stone	2002	Didimdol Net School	South Korea		
Ivy Club	2002	Ivy Club Uniforms	South Korea	With Shinhwa	
SK Telecom	2002	Nate Edu Motti	South Korea		
Jjolbyeong Snack	2003	Jjolbyeong Snack	South Korea	With Ji Sang-ryeol	
Jon jeonni	2003	Jon jeonni	South Korea		
Ministry of Culture, Sports and Tourism	2003	Government Information Agency	South Korea		
SK Telecom	2003	011 Ting	South Korea	With BoA, Jang Keun-suk, and Kim Sung-soo	
Cuckoo	2004	Cuckoo Electronics	South Korea	With Kim Hee-ae	
Morning Sunshine	2004	Morning Sunshine	South Korea		
Onion Rings	2004	Onion Rings	South Korea	With Oh Yeon-seo and Lee Hyun-jin	
Samyang Ramen	2004	Samyang Ramen	South Korea		
Color Splitz	2005	Color Pleats crayons	South Korea		
Hyundai	2005	Hyundai Sonata	Japan	With Bae Yong-joon, Ki-bum	
Ministry of Agriculture, Food and Rural Affairs	2005	Government Educational Video	South Korea	With Kang Soo-jung	
SK Telecom	2006	Happy Lunchbox	South Korea		
Look Optical	2011	"Eunjung's Glasses"	South Korea	With 2PM	
Heva Clonia	2011	New release	South Korea		
SPRIS	2011	Youth apparel	South Korea	With Kim Soo-hyun	
Tony Moly	2011	Floria Serum	South Korea		
Tony Moly	2011	Floria Serum	South Korea	With Song Joong-ki	
Mirae Asset Securities	2012	KDB Daewoo Securities	South Korea	Exclusive model	
Mirae Asset Securities	2012	KDB Daewoo Securities	South Korea	Exclusive model	
ELLE Golf	2017	KPGA Tour line	South Korea	With Choi Yeo-jin	
White Nine (W9)	2022	White Nine Celebrity Mask	Global	Exclusive model 2019–2023	
Lumiderm	2025	Eunjung's Pick	Global	Exclusive model 2023–2026	
