= List of Hahm Eun-jung live performances =

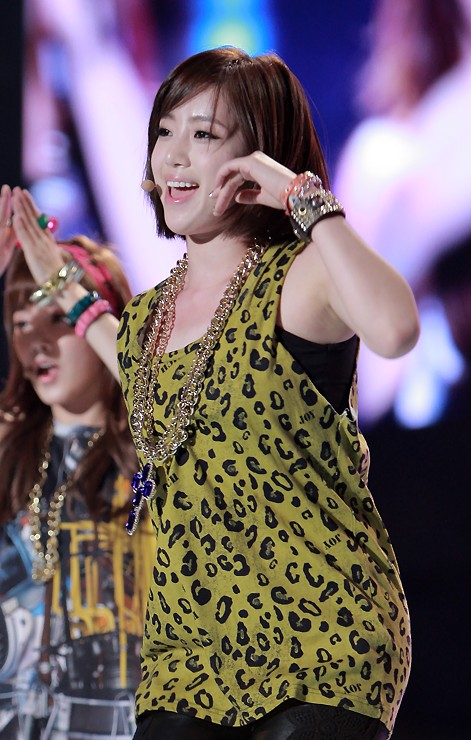
- Eun-jung at K-Collection Event, Seoul, March 2012
- Concert Tours: 1
- One-off Concerts: 1
- Fan meetings: 11
- Festivals: 2
- Joint Concerts & Tours: 7
- TV Shows & Specials: 26
- Awards shows: 1
- Radio: 1

Hahm Eun-jung (known professionally as Eunjung) is a South Korean singer and actress. Hahm began her singing career being featured on Black Pearl's single "Blue Moon", released in 2008 (featuring Davichi & Seeya). During her pre-debut, she was featured in multiple singles and collaborations until she officially debuted as a member of girl-group T-ara in 2009.

Hahm officially debuted as a solo artist in 2015 under the alias Elsie with her first mini-album I'm Good, and officially debuted as a solo artist in Japan with the mini album Desire in 2019.

== Promotional tours ==
=== Desire Mini-Live Tour ===
Dates	Associated album	Country	City	Venue	Ref.
June 12, 2019	Desire	Japan	Osaka	Banana Hall	
June 13, 2019	Desire	Japan	Osaka	Kuzuha Hall	
June 14, 2019	Desire	Japan	Nagoya	Legend Hall	
June 15, 2019	Desire	Japan	Yokohama	Ario Hashimoto	
June 16, 2019	Desire	Japan	Tokyo	Seven Park	
June 17, 2019	Desire	Japan	Tokyo	Tiat Sky Hall	

== One-off concerts ==
Year	Date	Title	Country	City	Venue	Ref.
2011	March 1, 2011	Dream High Concert	South Korea	Seoul	Aram-nuri Grand Theater	

== Fan meetings ==
Year	Date	Title	Country	City	Venue	Ref.
2016	March 3, 2016	"What Should I Do?"	Thailand	Bangkok	Aksra Theatre	
2018	July 7, 2018	"Summer Something" First Private Fan Meet	South Korea	Seoul	Seoul Indoor Gymnasium	
2018	October 14, 2018	"Global Fan meeting" Second Private Fan Meet	South Korea	Seoul	Gwang-hwamun Art	
2018	December 15, 2018	"I LOV 'e' YOU" First Birthday Fan Meet	South Korea	Seoul	Unknown	
2019	May 11, 2019	"Spring Trip" Third private Fan Meet	South Korea	Seoul	Unknown	
2019	July 13, 2019	"Summer Fantasia"	Macau	Macau	Broadway Macau Theatre	
2019	October 29, 2019	"Horror Night Party"	Japan	Tokyo	Tokyo Kinema Club	
2022	December 11, 2022	"Eun-Jung B-Day Party"	South Korea	Seoul	Banana Hall	
2023	September 22, 2023	"Love! Punch?"	Japan	Tokyo	Shibuya TakeOff7	
2023	December 10, 2023	HALZION~Special B-day event	Japan	Tokyo	Ginza DisGOONieS	
2024	December 14, 2024	"Winter Memory" Hahm Eunjung B-Day Party	China	Qingdao	Qingdao Westin Hotel	
2026	October 25, 2026	Hahm Eun Jung Beijing Fan Meeting	China	Beijing	TBA	

=== Cancelled ===
Year	Date	Title	Country	City	Reason
2020	February 11, 2020	"EUN JUNG Valentine's TOUR"	Japan	Seoul	COVID-19 pandemic
2020	December 13, 2020	"A Lovely Day"	South Korea	Tokyo	COVID-19 pandemic

== Festivals ==
Year	Date	Title	City	Country	Performed Song(s)	Ref.
2013	August 14, 2013	Jecheon International Music & Film Festival (Opening Ceremony)	Jecheon	South Korea	"Falling Slowly" (Note: Glen Hansard cover)	
2022	August 31, 2022	Korea-Japan Friendship Music Festival	Tokyo	Japan		

== Award Shows ==
Year	Date	Title	Country	Performed Song(s)	City
2004	December 31, 2004	SBS Drama Awards	South Korea	Unknown	Seoul

== Joint Concerts & Tours ==
Year	Date	Title	City	Country	Performed Song(s)
2008	November 11, 2008	MTV Korea Live Stage	Seoul	South Korea	"Gani" (Note: special appearance, with SeeYa)
2008	November 23, 2008	Open Concert	Seoul	South Korea	"Gani"
2015	May 30, 2015	Guerilla Live	Seoul	South Korea	"I'm Good"
2015	May 31, 2015	Guerilla Live	Seoul	South Korea	"I'm Good"
2015	August 31, 2015	21st Dream Concert	Seoul	South Korea	"I'm Good"
2023	September 26, 2023	Adex Super Concert	Ho Chi Minh City	Vietnam	"I'm Good"; "Shout Out To The Sky" (Note: My Secret Terrius OST); "Throbbing, Sometimes Beating" (Note: Apple of My Eye OST); "Bo peep Bo Peep"; "Lovey Dovey"; "Roly Poly"; "Can You Wait For Me?" (Note: Mỹ Tâm cover)
2025	October 25, 2025	Starry Night In Busan Concert	Busan	South Korea	"Goodbye"; "Bo peep Bo Peep"
2026	September 12, 2026	I Like It. Korea Milk	Almaty	Kazakhstan	"Roly Poly"; "Lovey Dovey"

== TV shows and specials ==
Year	Date	Show	Performed Song(s)	Ref.
2008	Unknown	Show! Music Core	"Gani" (Note: special appearance, with SeeYa)	
2009	August 27, 2009	M Countdown	"How Come" (Note: Collaboration stage with Brown Eyed Girls)	
2010	March 26, 2010	You Hee-yeol's Sketchbook	"Wait A Minute" (Note: The Pussycat Dolls cover)	
2011	March 3, 2011	M Countdown	"It's You" (Note: Special appearance, with F-ve Dolls)	
2011	March 4, 2011	Music Bank	"It's You"	
2011	March 5, 2011	Music Core	"It's You"	
2011	March 18, 2011	Music Bank	"It's You"	
2013	January 1, 2013	Show Champion	"Champion" (Note: MC special)	
2013	December 28, 2013	Immortal Songs 2: Singing the Legend	"Not Anyone Can Love" (Note: Tae Jin-ah cover)	
2014	January 25, 2014	Immortal Songs 2: Singing the Legend	"Faraway Home" (Note: Na Hoon-a cover)	
2014	January 25, 2014	Music Travel Yesterday	"Still You" (Note: Cover)	
2015	February 2, 2015	M Countdown	"Don't Forget Me"	
2015	May 7, 2015	M Countdown	"I'm Good"	
2015	May 8, 2015	Music Bank	"I'm Good"	
2015	May 12, 2015	100 People, 100 Songs	"Beginning" (Note: Park Ki-young cover); "To Heaven" (Note: Jo Sung-mo cover)	
2015	May 14, 2015	The Show	"I'm Good"; "Tears Drop"	
2015	May 16, 2015	Show! Music Core	"I'm Good"	
2015	May 22, 2015	Music Bank	"I'm Good"	
2015	May 23, 2015	Show! Music Core	"I'm Good"	
2018	January 21, 2018	King of Masked Singer	"I'm Different" (Note: Cover)	
2018	January 28, 2018	King of Masked Singer	"R.P.G" (Note: W & Whale cover)	
2022	September 12, 2022	Mystery Duet	"Your Shampoo Scent In The Flowers" (Note: Be Melodramatic OST cover)	
2023	August 31, 2023	Music In The Trip	"Dream" (Note: cover)	
2023	October 19, 2023	Music In The Trip	"Love" (Note: Lyn cover)	
2023	November 18, 2023	Music In The Trip	"I Believe"	
2023	November 23, 2023	Music In The Trip	"City Drive"	

== Radio shows ==
Year	Date	Show	Songs performed
2009	August 25, 2009	Yoon Gun's Dreamy Radio	"Baby Bye Bye" (Note: Yoon Mi-rae cover))
