= Seo Jun-young =

South Korean actor (born 1987)

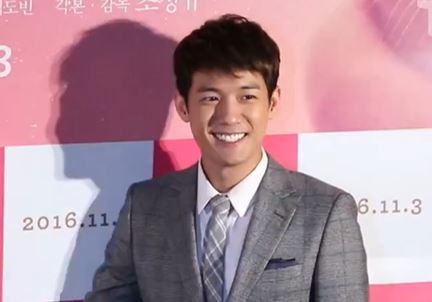
- Seo in October 2016
- Born: Kim Sang-gu; April 24, 1987 (age 39); Yeongcheon, Gyeongsangbuk-do, South Korea
- Other name: Suh Joon-yeong
- Education: Inha University; Theater and Film
- Occupation: Actor
- Years active: 2004–present
- Agent(s): T&I Cultures

Korean name
- Hangul: 김상구
- Hanja: 金尚久
- RR: Gim Sanggu
- MR: Kim Sanggu

Stage name
- Hangul: 서준영
- Hanja: 徐俊英
- RR: Seo Junyeong
- MR: Sŏ Chunyŏng

Seo Jun-young (Korean: 서준영; April 24, 1987), born Kim Sang-gu (김상구), is a South Korean actor. He is best known for his roles in award-winning indie Bleak Night, period drama Deep Rooted Tree, coming-of-age film Eighteen (also known as Whirlwind), and comedy series Super Daddy Yeol.

== Filmography ==
=== Film ===
Year	Title	Role	Notes	Ref.
2000	Winter Sonata	Yong-ki		
2006	Bewitching Attraction	young Suk-gyu		
2009	Eighteen	Kim Tae-hoon		
2011	Bleak Night	Dong-yoon		
2012	My Back Page	Umeyama	Barrier Free version - Korean dubbed	
2014	Broken	Park Hyeon-soo		
2015	Kwon Bob: Chinatown	Ko Jeong-hyeok		
2015	Speed	Lee Choo-won		
2020	For the New Emperor	Sin Hwang-je		
2021	Camellia	Hwang Gwi-tae		
2021	A Long Day	film director		

=== Television movies ===
Year	Title	Role	Ref.
2015	I'm After You	Yoo Min-woo	

=== Television series ===
Year	Title	Role	Notes	Ref.
2005	Hello My Teacher	Park Jae-in		
2005	Marrying a Millionaire	Kim Tae-hoon		
2006	Sharp 3	Park Yi-joon		
2007	Heaven & Earth	Song Ji-min		
2007	Lucifer	young Kang Oh-soo		
2007	War of Money – Bonus Round	Kim Byul		
2007	Kimcheed Radish Cubes	Jung Dong-min		
2007	Yeon Gaesomun	Yeon Heonseong		
2008	The Great King, Sejong	Grand Prince Suyang		
2008	My Pitiful Sister	young Lee Deok-san		
2009	A Goose's Dream	Min Seung-gi		
2009	Again, My Love	young Lee Jung-hoon		
2009	He Who Can't Marry	Tae-yeol, Yoo-jin's ex-boyfriend		
2009	Soul	young Shin Ryu		
2010	KBS Drama Special: "The Scary One, The Ghost and I"	young Kim Yong-soo		
2010	Grudge: The Revolt of Gumiho	Chun-woo		
2010	Smile, Mom	Lee Kang-so		
2011	Deep Rooted Tree	Grand Prince Gwangpyeong		
2011	My One and Only	Ki Woon-chan		
2012	To the Beautiful You	Ha Seung-ri		
2013	KBS Drama Special: "Sirius"	Eun-chang / Shin-woo		
2013	Unemployed Romance	Song Wan-ha		
2013	Wang's Family	Gwang-bak's primary school classmate	Cameo (episode 18)	
2014	KBS Drama Special: "The Dirge Singer"	Yoon Soo		
2014	Secret Door	Shin Heung-bok	Cameo (episode 1–2)	
2014	Tears of Heaven	Lee Ki-hyun / Cha Sung-tan		
2015	Super Daddy Yeol	Shin Woo-hyuk		
2016	The Promise	Kang Taejun		
2016	Another Miss Oh	Hae-young (gold)'s blind date	Caemo (episode 15)	
2016	A Beautiful Mind	Lee Sang Joon	Cameo (episodes 2 and 9)	
2023	Apple of My Eye	Keum Kang-san		
2024	The Brave Yong Su-jeong	Yeo Eui-joo		
2025	Queen's House	Kim Do-yoon		

=== Web series ===
Year	Title	Role	Notes	Ref.
2015	Sweet Temptation	Sang-min	miniseries	
2022	Goyang Makgeolli Shooting Battle	Park Kyung-seok		

=== Music video appearances ===
Year	Song title	Artist	Ref.
2004	"Let's Break Up"	Yoon Gun	
2005	"As We Live"	SG Wannabe	
2005	"Sin and Punishment"	SG Wannabe	
2007	"Be Burnt Completely Black"	M To M	
2008	"Lalala"	SG Wannabe	
2010	"Good"	Daybreak	

== Awards and nominations ==
Award	Year	Category	Nominated work	Result	Ref.
APAN Star Awards	2024	Excellence Award ㅡ Actor in a Serial Drama	The Brave Yong Su-jeong	Nominated	
APAN Star Awards	2025	Top Excellence Award ㅡ Actor in Serial Drama	Queen's House	Nominated	
Blue Dragon Film Awards	2011	Best New Actor	Bleak Night	Nominated	
Buil Film Awards	2011	Best New Actor	Eighteen	Nominated	
Buil Film Awards	2011	Best New Actor	Bleak Night	Nominated	
KBS Drama Awards	2013	Best Actor ㅡ One Act/Special Drama	Sirius	Nominated	
KBS Drama Awards	2014	Best Actor ㅡ One-Act/Special Drama	The Dirge Singer	Nominated	
KBS Drama Awards	2025	Popularity Award ㅡ Actor	Queen's House	Nominated	
Korean Culture and Entertainment Awards	2011	Best New Actor	Bleak Night	Won	
MBC Drama Awards	2024	Top Excellence Award ㅡ Actor in a Daily/Short Drama	The Brave Yong Su-jeong	Won	
Seoul Independent Film Festival	2009	Independent Star Award	Eighteen	Won	
