= The Brave Yong Su-jeong =

2024 South Korean television series

- Promotional poster
- Hangul: 용감무쌍 용수정
- Hanja: 勇敢無雙 龍秀炡
- RR: Yonggammussang Yong Sujeong
- MR: Yonggammussang Yong Sujŏng
- Genre: Romance; Revenge
- Created by: Jang Jae-hoon
- Written by: Choi Yeon-geol
- Directed by: Kim Mi-sook; Lee Min-soo
- Starring: Uhm Hyun-kyung; Seo Jun-young; Lim Ju-eun; Kwon Hwa-woon
- Music by: Ma Sang-woo
- Country of origin: South Korea
- Original language: Korean
- No. of episodes: 124

Production
- Executive producer: Lee Hyeong-seon
- Producer: Kim Seo-gon
- Running time: 30 minutes
- Production company: MBC C&I

Original release
- Network: MBC TV
- Release: May 6 – November 15, 2024

The Brave Yong Su-jeong (Korean: 용감무쌍 용수정) is a 2024 South Korean television series starring Uhm Hyun-kyung in the title role, along with Seo Jun-young, Lim Ju-eun, and Kwon Hwa-woon. It aired on MBC TV from May 6, to November 15, 2024, every Monday to Friday at 19:05 (KST).

== Synopsis ==
The Brave Yong Su-jeong tells the story of Yong Su-jeong, an outspoken and popular home shopping host who dreams of becoming a modern-day magnate.

== Cast and characters ==
=== Main ===
- Uhm Hyun-kyung as Yong Su-jeong
- Seo Jun-young as Yeo Eui-joo / Joo Eui-joo
- Lim Ju-eun as Choi Hye-ra
- Kwon Hwa-woon as Joo Woo-jin

=== Supporting ===
==== People around Su-jeong ====
- Park Chul-min as Yong Jang-won

Su-jeong's adoptive father.

- Choi Su-rin as Lee Jae-in

Su-jeong's mother.

- Yang Jung-a as Lee Young-ae

Eui-joo's mother.

- Lee Hwa-jung as Ki Mi-yeon

Su-jeong's close friend. Producing director of MS Home Shopping.

==== People around Eui-joo ====
- Lee Soo-yong as Kook Jin-soo

A senior at Eui-joo's school.

==== People around Hye-ra ====
- Ji Soo-won as Geum Han-yang

Hye-ra's mother and former lover of Jang Myung-cheol.

==== People around Woo-jin ====
- Kim Yong-rim as Hwang Jae-rim

Masung Group's chairwoman.

- Lee Seung-yeon as Min Kyung-hwa

Hwang Jae-rim's daughter-in-law and Woo-jin's mother.

- Gong Jung-hwan as Jang Myung-cheol

Driver for Kyung-hwa's husband.

- Kim Tae-yeon as Joo Ha-min

Woo-jin's daughter.

== Viewership ==
The Brave Yong Su-jeong : South Korea viewers per episode (thousands)

Episodes	Episode number																								
Episodes	1	2	3	4	5	6	7	8	9	10	11	12	13	14	15	16	17	18	19	20	21	22	23	24	25
1–25	1017	743	601	780	712	750	706	812	647	719	904	791	694	719	633	779	724	722	775	692	872	701	726	664	807
26–50	741	790	738	736	694	782	652	720	743	776	685	649	746	704	668	769	893	837	745	740	769	861	633	696	652
51–75	871	821	824	805	831	944	941	724	895	790	961	831	862	977	948	992	894	853	927	898	1009	972	863	793	879
76–100	972	825	875	962	910	881	899	805	957	964	914	1002	1005	879	803	996	911	897	990	1023	1189	1044	1036	1029	1087
101–124	1009	891	1093	1055	1045	893	986	876	1064	890	932	955	906	1027	1047	1019	931	1002	1063	1000	1107	1011	984	1066	–

Source: Audience measurement performed nationwide by Nielsen Korea.

Average TV viewership ratings
Ep.	Original broadcast date	Average audience share	
Ep.	Original broadcast date	Nielsen Korea	
Ep.	Original broadcast date	Nationwide	Seoul
1	May 6, 2024	5.9% (8th)	5.8% (6th)
2	May 7, 2024	4.6% (10th)	4.0% (10th)
3	May 8, 2024	3.8% (12th)	3.4% (14th)
4	May 9, 2024	4.5% (10th)	4.0% (10th)
5	May 10, 2024	4.1% (12th)	3.9% (10th)
6	May 13, 2024	4.6% (12th)	4.3% (9th)
7	May 14, 2024	4.1% (10th)	3.9% (8th)
8	May 15, 2024	4.7% (10th)	4.3% (11th)
9	May 16, 2024	4.4% (10th)	4.0% (10th)
10	May 17, 2024	4.4% (10th)	4.2% (11th)
11	May 20, 2024	5.5% (6th)	4.9% (6th)
12	May 21, 2024	4.7% (8th)	4.1% (9th)
13	May 22, 2024	4.5% (9th)	4.1% (9th)
14	May 23, 2024	4.2% (10th)	3.4% (12th)
15	May 24, 2024	3.8% (13th)	3.7% (12th)
16	May 27, 2024	4.8% (11th)	4.3% (10th)
17	May 28, 2024	4.3% (10th)	3.5% (12th)
18	May 29, 2024	4.2% (12th)	3.8% (13th)
19	May 30, 2024	5.0% (8th)	4.5% (8th)
20	May 31, 2024	4.3% (13th)	4.0% (13th)
21	June 3, 2024	5.3% (7th)	4.9% (7th)
22	June 4, 2024	4.4% (10th)	4.0% (11th)
23	June 5, 2024	4.4% (9th)	3.9% (10th)
24	June 6, 2024	3.9% (15th)	3.5% (13th)
25	June 7, 2024	4.7% (12th)	4.5% (10th)
26	June 10, 2024	4.8% (10th)	4.5% (8th)
27	June 11, 2024	4.6% (8th)	4.3% (5th)
28	June 12, 2024	4.8% (11th)	4.5% (10th)
29	June 13, 2024	4.9% (7th)	4.3% (6th)
30	June 14, 2024	4.2% (12th)	4.0% (10th)
31	June 17, 2024	5.1% (9th)	4.6% (7th)
32	June 18, 2024	4.2% (10th)	3.5% (10th)
33	June 19, 2024	4.5% (9th)	4.4% (8th)
34	June 20, 2024	4.8% (7th)	4.2% (6th)
35	June 21, 2024	4.4% (11th)	4.1% (11th)
36	June 24, 2024	4.4% (11th)	4.1% (11th)
37	June 25, 2024	4.3% (10th)	4.0% (7th)
38	June 26, 2024	4.6% (9th)	4.0% (10th)
39	June 27, 2024	4.6% (10th)	4.1% (8th)
40	June 28, 2024	4.1% (12th)	3.4% (12th)
41	July 1, 2024	5.1% (12th)	4.7% (13th)
42	July 2, 2024	5.8% (8th)	5.4% (9th)
43	July 3, 2024	5.0% (7th)	4.4% (8th)
44	July 4, 2024	5.0% (10th)	4.5% (8th)
45	July 5, 2024	4.9% (10th)	4.7% (10th)
46	July 8, 2024	5.1% (12th)	4.7% (13th)
47	July 9, 2024	5.9% (7th)	5.5% (8th)
48	July 10, 2024	4.4% (13th)	3.8% (13th)
49	July 11, 2024	4.4% (8th)	4.0% (10th)
50	July 12, 2024	4.3% (11th)	4.2% (10th)
51	July 15, 2024	5.4% (9th)	4.7% (9th)
52	July 16, 2024	5.7% (10th)	5.0% (9th)
53	July 17, 2024	5.2% (11th)	5.2% (10th)
54	July 18, 2024	5.1% (10th)	4.9% (8th)
55	July 19, 2024	4.9% (9th)	4.2% (11th)
56	July 22, 2024	5.8% (7th)	5.4% (8th)
57	July 23, 2024	5.4% (6th)	5.2% (7th)
58	July 24, 2024	4.6% (10th)	3.9% (11th)
59	July 25, 2024	5.3% (7th)	4.8% (6th)
60	July 26, 2024	4.9% (9th)	4.2% (11th)
61	August 12, 2024	5.8% (9th)	5.6% (8th)
62	August 13, 2024	5.3% (7th)	5.0% (8th)
63	August 14, 2024	5.3% (8th)	4.9% (8th)
64	August 15, 2024	5.7% (7th)	5.5% (5th)
65	August 16, 2024	5.9% (7th)	5.6% (9th)
66	August 19, 2024	6.2% (6th)	5.9% (7th)
67	August 20, 2024	5.9% (6th)	5.7% (7th)
68	August 21, 2024	5.8% (7th)	5.4% (8th)
69	August 22, 2024	5.8% (6th)	5.3% (7th)
70	August 23, 2024	5.7% (8th)	5.6% (9th)
71	August 26, 2024	6.3% (6th)	6.3% (5th)
72	August 27, 2024	6.0% (5th)	5.9% (5th)
73	August 28, 2024	5.8% (6th)	5.6% (6th)
74	August 29, 2024	5.4% (6th)	5.2% (7th)
75	August 30, 2024	5.5% (9th)	5.0% (10th)
76	September 2, 2024	6.5% (5th)	6.4% (5th)
77	September 3, 2024	5.5% (7th)	5.3% (6th)
78	September 4, 2024	5.7% (6th)	5.2% (7th)
79	September 5, 2024	6.1% (6th)	5.8% (5th)
80	September 6, 2024	5.9% (8th)	5.6% (10th)
81	September 9, 2024	6.0% (6th)	5.8% (6th)
82	September 10, 2024	5.8% (7th)	5.3% (8th)
83	September 11, 2024	5.5% (7th)	5.2% (8th)
84	September 12, 2024	6.3% (5th)	6.1% (4th)
85	September 13, 2024	5.7% (11th)	5.9% (9th)
86	September 19, 2024	6.2% (5th)	5.9% (6th)
87	September 20, 2024	5.7% (11th)	5.3% (11th)
88	September 23, 2024	6.5% (5th)	6.2% (6th)
89	September 24, 2024	5.6% (7th)	5.4% (6th)
90	September 25, 2024	5.2% (7th)	4.9% (8th)
91	September 26, 2024	6.6% (6th)	6.2% (4th)
92	September 27, 2024	6.0% (9th)	5.4% (10th)
93	September 30, 2024	6.1% (5th)	5.5% (6th)
94	October 1, 2024	6.2% (8th)	5.8% (8th)
95	October 2, 2024	6.1% (5th)	5.8% (6th)
96	October 3, 2024	7.2% (5th)	6.6% (6th)
97	October 4, 2024	6.7% (8th)	6.3% (8th)
98	October 7, 2024	6.7% (5th)	6.1% (6th)
99	October 8, 2024	6.9% (3rd)	6.4% (3rd)
100	October 9, 2024	6.5% (8th)	5.9% (7th)
101	October 10, 2024	6.7% (6th)	6.3% (6th)
102	October 11, 2024	6.0% (7th)	6.1% (7th)
103	October 14, 2024	6.7% (5th)	5.9% (6th)
104	October 15, 2024	6.9% (4th)	5.8% (5th)
105	October 16, 2024	6.7% (7th)	5.9% (7th)
106	October 18, 2024	6.1% (9th)	5.5% (8th)
107	October 22, 2024	6.4% (9th)	5.7% (8th)
108	October 23, 2024	5.5% (7th)	4.9% (8th)
109	October 24, 2024	6.3% (5th)	5.5% (6th)
110	October 28, 2024	6.1% (6th)	5.4% (6th)
111	October 29, 2024	6.3% (6th)	5.6% (6th)
112	October 30, 2024	6.3% (6th)	5.6% (7th)
113	October 31, 2024	5.9% (5th)	5.2% (6th)
114	November 1, 2024	6.6% (8th)	6.0% (8th)
115	November 4, 2024	6.5% (6th)	5.7% (6th)
116	November 5, 2024	6.3% (6th)	5.4% (7th)
117	November 6, 2024	5.9% (7th)	5.1% (7th)
118	November 7, 2024	6.2% (6th)	5.6% (6th)
119	November 8, 2024	6.8% (7th)	6.0% (8th)
120	November 11, 2024	6.2% (6th)	5.1% (7th)
121	November 12, 2024	6.9% (5th)	6.0% (5th)
122	November 13, 2024	6.3% (8th)	5.2% (9th)
123	November 14, 2024	6.6% (7th)	5.9% (5th)
124	November 15, 2024	7.1% (6th)	6.7% (7th)
Average		5.5%	5.0%
In the table above, the blue numbers represent the lowest ratings and the red numbers represent the highest ratings.
