= Park Geon-il =

South Korean actor

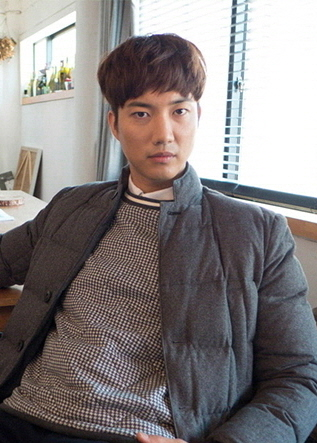
- Park in 2014
- Born: Park Geon-il; 5 November 1987 (age 38); Seoul, South Korea
- Other names: Park Gun-il, Geon-il, Gun-il, Park Keon-il
- Education: Dongguk University (Department of Theater and Visual Science)
- Occupations: Actor; model; singer
- Years active: 2000–present
- Agent: Huayi Brothers Korea
- Known for: Jang Bo-ri Is Here! Lovers of Haeundae; The King of Legend

Park Geon-il (born November 5, 1987) is a South Korean actor, singer and model. He is the lead vocalist of Supernova. He is known for his lead roles in Koisuru Maison: Rainbow Rose, One Fine Week and Lonely Enough To Love.

== Career ==
Park signed a contract with Marro Entertainment in 2000. He made his debut as an actor in 2002 in television series Honest Living. In 2003 he played a student role in television series Sang Doo! Let's Go to School and the next year he appeared in the television series Love is All Around which gained him some attention. In 2007, he joined the boy group Supernova as its lead vocalist.

He then appeared in a number of films and dramas, including Soul as Jung Shi-woo, The King of Legend and Jang Bo-ri Is Here!. He also had a main role in drama Koisuru Maison: Rainbow Rose which was praised and gained attention him attention. In 2018, he left Marro Entertainment and signed a contract with Huayi Brothers Korea.

In 2019, Park starred in his eight acting appearance as Yoo Ji-han in the television series One Fine Week which made him noted by the audience.

In 2020 he got his first major acting role as the second male lead in the MBC television series Lonely Enough to Love as Kang Hyun-jin starring opposite of Kim So-eun and Ji Hyun-woo.

== Filmography ==
=== Television ===
Year	Title	Role	Ref.
2002	Honest Living	Han Bong-joo	
2003	Sang Doo! Let's Go to School	Baek Seung-yoon	
2004	Love is All Around	Keon-il	
2009	Soul	Jung Shi-woo	
2010	The King of Legend	Geung Woo-soo	
2011	Sign	Seo Yoon-hyung	
2012	Koisuru Maison: Rainbow Rose	Yuichi	
2012	Drama Special Series: Amore Mio	Lee Jin-gook	
2012	Lovers of Haeundae	Lee Dong-baek	
2014	Jang Bo-ri Is Here!	Kang Yoo-cheon	
2019	Stranger Kim	Ji	
2019	One Fine Week	Yoo Ji-han	
2020	Kkindae	Lee Joon-won	
2020	Lonely Enough To Love	Kang Hyun-jin	
2020	One Fine Week 2	Yoo Ji-han	
2020	Kkindae	Lee Joon-woo	
2021	Case Cell Division	Lee Sun-jae	
2021	Start Up the Engine	Geon-il	
2021	Red Shoes	Kim Jin-ho	
2021	Mr. Lee	Mr. Lee	
2025–2026	First Man	Kang Jun-ho	
2026	The Judge Returns	Kwak Sun-won	

=== Web series ===
Year	Title	Role	Ref.
2021	Mr. LEE	Mr. Lee	

=== Film ===
Year	Title	Role	Language	Ref.
2005	Mr.Housewife	Han Sang-min	Korean	
2006	Ssunday Seoul	Student	Korean	
2010	A Love Song For You	Park Jeon-shik	Korean	
2010	The Quiz Show Scandal	Kim	Korean	
2012	Our after school	Himself	Korean	
2022	Cafe Midnight	Kim Kyung-jang	Korean	

== Awards and nominations ==
Name of the award ceremony, year presented, category, nominee of the award, and the result of the nomination
Award ceremony	Year	Category	Nominee / Work	Result	Ref.
Asia Artist Awards	2021	AAA Focus (Actor)	Park Geon-il	Won	
