= The First Man (TV series) =

2025 South Korean television series

- Promotional poster
- Hangul: 첫 번째 남자
- RR: Cheot beonjjae namja
- MR: Ch'ŏt pŏntchae namja
- Genre: Romance; Revenge; Crime
- Written by: Seo Hyun-joo; Ahn Jin-young
- Directed by: Kang Tae-heum
- Starring: Hahm Eun-jung; Oh Hyun-kyung; Yoon Sun-woo; Park Geon-il; Kim Min-seol
- Music by: Choi In-hee
- Ending theme: "Dear My Sun" by Son Tae-jin
- Country of origin: South Korea
- Original language: Korean
- No. of episodes: 140

Production
- Producers: Lee Hyeong-seon; Kim Dong-gu
- Running time: 30 minutes
- Production companies: MBC C&I; DK Entertainment

Original release
- Network: MBC TV
- Release: December 15, 2025 – July 2, 2026

The First Man (Korean: 첫 번째 남자) is a 2025-26 South Korean television series written by Seo Hyun-joo and Ahn Jin-young, directed by Kang Tae-heum, and starring Hahm Eun-jung, Oh Hyun-kyung, Yoon Sun-woo, Park Geon-il, and Kim Min-seol. The series follows the intertwined lives of two women driven by deadly desires, one seeking vengeance, and the other fueled by selfish ambition. It aired on MBC TV on December 15, 2025, to July 2, 2026, every Monday to Friday at 19:05 (KST).

== Synopsis ==
In 1995, twin sisters Oh Jang-mi and Ma Seo-rin were born. One of them was forcibly taken by Chae Hwa-young from their birth mother, Jeong Suk-hee. The child was later brought into Chairman Ma's house, where Hwa-young claimed her as her own child with Dong-seok. Ultimately, she joined the Chairman Ma's family and fulfilled her desire to enter the Dream Group. As the twins grow up, they lead vastly different lives, one is the spirited and righteous, and the other is a spoiled heiress. One day, when the twin sisters finally meet, they later decide to switch identities to uncover the hidden truth. Ma Seo-rin, who took on Oh Jang-mi's identity, was in a coma after an accident orchestrated by Chae Hwa-young, intended for Jang-mi. Jang-mi later assumed Seo-rin's identity to gather evidence against Chae Hwa-young, to crush and bring down the evil woman. As Kang Baek-ho and Kang Jun-ho, two brothers, become entwined with Jang-mi, romance, rivalry, and secrets slowly unfold.

== Cast and characters ==
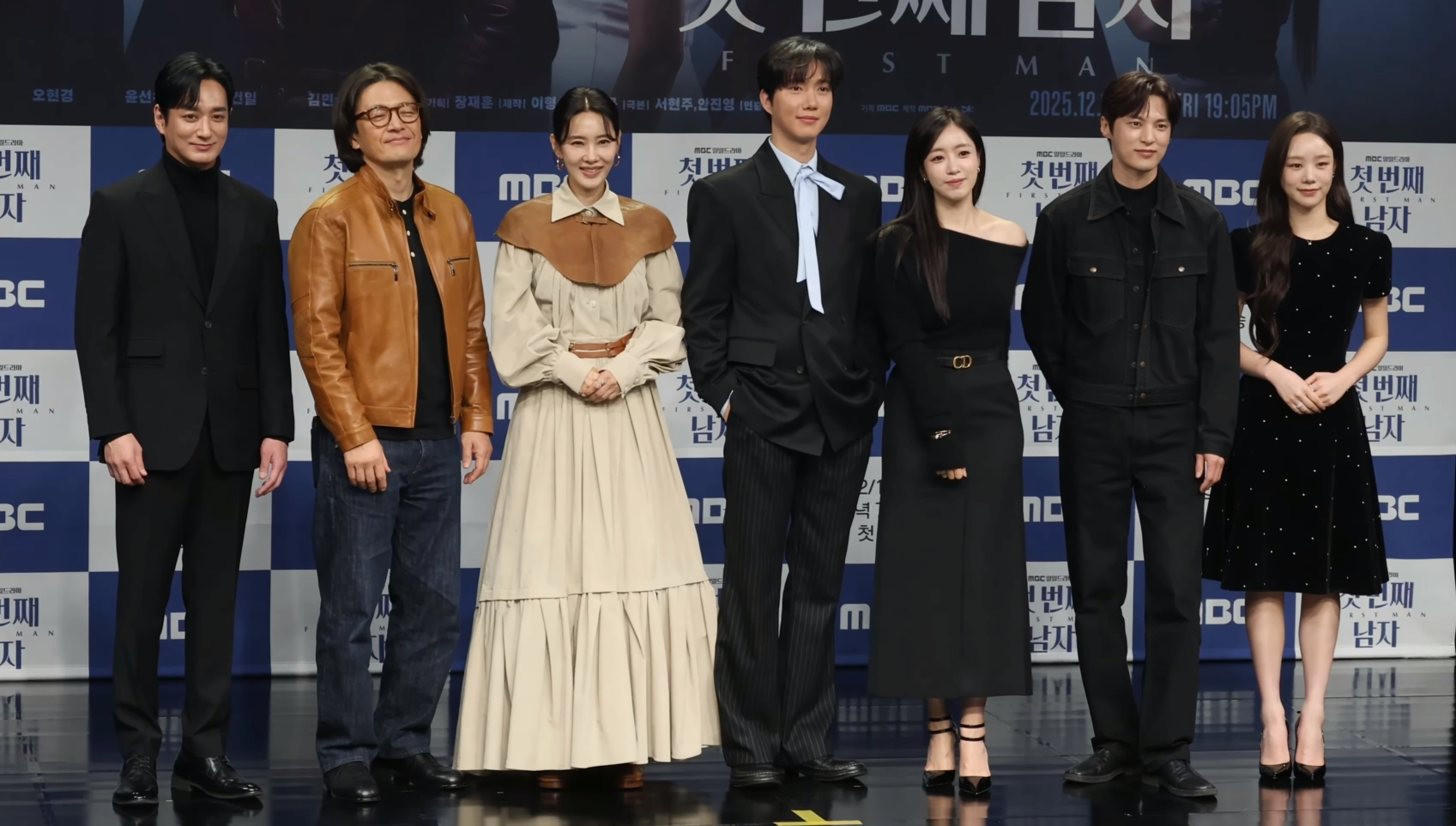
The cast of The First Man at the press conference in December 2025. From left to right: Lee Jae-hwang, Jung Chan, Oh Hyun-kyung, Park Geon-il, Hahm Eun-jung, Yoon Sun-woo, and Kim Min-seol

=== Main ===
- Hahm Eun-jung as Oh Jang-mi / Ma Seo-rin
1. Oh Jang-mi: The older of the twins who is a warm-hearted and principled young woman with a culinary dream, working hard to open her own restaurant. She inherited her mother's culinary skills. Her dream is to meet Chef Kang Jun-ho and become his apprentice, and she even got an interview to work with him, but in the end she couldn't make it. One day, Jang-mi's world is turned upside down when she discovers that Chae Hwa-young, someone she once admired, is actually her arch-enemy. After uncovering the truth, a burning desire for justice consumes her, and Jang-mi sets out to punish Hwa-young for her heinous actions.
2. Ma Seo-rin: The younger of the twins, who grew up as the spoiled and troublesome granddaughter of the Dream Group, is a reckless woman who fears nothing in life and has everything she wants. Separated from her birth mother and twin at birth by Chae Hwa-young, she was raised as her own, unaware of the hidden truth. Her goal is to win Kang Jun-ho's heart and make him her man. After being mistaken for Jang-mi, she's driven by curiosity to find her, and unexpectedly becomes the first to discover that she has a twin, leading her to dig into Hwa-young, who isn't biologically related to her.
- Oh Hyun-kyung as Chae Hwa-young

A former top star who hides her tough ambition and strong will behind a beautiful smile. She is the daughter-in-law and CEO of the Dream Group, and Seo-rin's mother, who's ruining another woman's life to achieve her ambition of taking over the Dream Group. Fueled by her cruelness, she'll stop at nothing to keep Jang-mi from the Chairman and Seo-rin, even if it means silencing her forever.

- Yoon Sun-woo as Kang Baek-ho

A lawyer at Law Firm Leeho. His strong sense of justice compels him to help those in need. He is always kept girls at a distance, but Jang-mi is the one who gets him to open his heart. When Hwa-young's orchestrated accident almost kills Jang-mi, he's the first to rescue her. Baek-ho is her constant ally in the pursuit of justice, truth, and revenge.

- Park Geon-il as Kang Jun-ho

The head chef of Chang Restaurant at Dream Hotel, who is Baek-ho's older brother. He is a former three-star Michelin chef, known for being cold and unfeeling. But Jang-mi's presence brings out emotions he's never experienced before. He is Hwa-young's biological son, whom she desperately tried to find for many years, after leaving him in the orphanage to pursue a career and success. Seo-rin's obsession makes him uncomfortable, and his focus remains firmly on his work, with little regard for his love life, until the other twin enters the picture.

- Kim Min-seol as Jin Hong-ju

The assistant manager, who later becomes team leader at the Dream Hotel, is a ruthless and ambitious woman with deep feelings for Baek-ho. She is Jun-ho's classmate at a culinary school in the US. She hates both of the twin sisters, one for always mocking and treating her like a servant, and the other for stealing her love.

=== Supporting ===
==== Jang-mi's family ====
- Jung So-young as Jeong Suk-hee

Jang-mi and Seo-rin's biological mother. She was once a bright and intelligent woman, but Hwa-young ruined her life. To protect the other twin, she took a risk and suffered a tragic accident that left her with the mental capacity of a five-year-old.

- Kim Hak-seon as Oh Bok-gil

Jang-mi's adoptive father. He grew up with Suk-hee in an orphanage. After a tragic accident happened to her, he took care of her and her child and loves them like they're his own family.

- Lee Ki-chang as Oh Tae-pyeong

Jang-mi's adoptive older brother and the son of Bok-gil. He loves singing and chases his dreams, but repeatedly gets scammed and loses hope. He is Baek-ho's best friend.

- Jeon A-reum as Oh Tae-sook

Bok-gil's daughter, who is Tae-pyeong's older sister, and Jang-mi's adoptive sister.

- Kim Ra-hee as Yeon Bo-ra

Tae-sook's daughter.

==== Chairman Ma's family ====
- Lee Hyo-jung as Ma Dae-chang

The chairman of the Dream Group.

- Kim Young-pil as Ma Dong-seok

Jang-mi and Seo-rin's biological father, and Suk-hee's lover, who is the heir of the Dream Group, has gone missing for many years.

- Lee Jae-hwang as Lee Kang-hyuk

Hwa-young's trusted secretary.

- Ahn Joo-in as Yang Geom-sun

Chairman Ma's housekeeper.

==== Baek-ho's family ====
- Jung Chan as Kang Nam-bong

Baek-ho's father. While working on the Dream Hotel’s reconstruction, he happened to meet Chae Hwa-young and eventually started an affair with her.

- Choi Ji-yeon as Han Young-ja

Baek-ho's mother.

==== Hong-ju's family ====
- Kim Seon-hye as Yeom San-wol

Hong-ju's mother, who successfully seduces Chairman Ma and becomes his second wife. She is Hwa-young's elementary school classmate and her former assistant.

== Production ==
=== Development ===
The First Man is directed by Kang Tae-heum, who previously helmed Desperate Mrs. Seonju (2024–2025), and Seo Hyun-joo of The Second Husband (2021–2022), and Ahn Ji-young co-wrote the screenplay. Produced by MBC C&I and DK Entertainment and planned by Jang Jae-hoon, the series revolves around a woman driven by desire, who devastates another woman's life to attain her goal, while the other woman seeks revenge by choosing a new path. Director Kang stated that the title 'First Man' could also be called 'First Love'. He aimed to convey that love can help overcome any obstacle or hardship through this series.

On April 24, 2026, the series was extended by 20 episodes, from 120 to 140 episodes.

=== Casting ===
In October 2025, Hahm Eun-jung, Oh Hyun-kyung, Yoon Sun-woo, Park Geon-il, and Kim Min-seol were officially confirmed to star. Additionally, Hahm previously led the KBS2 daily drama Queen's House (2025), and Kim Min-seol, a participant from Single's Inferno season 4, made her leading role debut in the series. The next month, it was announced that Lee Hyo-jung, Jung So-young, Jung Chan, and Lee Jae-hwang had joined the cast.

== Release ==
The First Man was set to premiere on MBC TV in the second half of 2025 and air in an MBC Monday–Friday timeslot. The series was originally scheduled to premiere on December 1, 2025, but was postponed. In November 2025, a script reading was revealed, and it was officially confirmed to premiere on December 15.

== Original soundtrack ==
=== Part 1 ===
Released on December 22, 2025
No.	Title	Lyrics	Music	Artist	Length
1.	"Dear My Sun"	HAP; Silver G	HAP; Silver G	Son Tae-jin	3:57
2.	"Dear My Sun" (Inst.)		HAP; Silver G		3:57
Total length:					7:54

=== Part 2 ===
Released on February 10, 2026
No.	Title	Lyrics	Music	Artist	Length
1.	"Like a Wave" (그저 난 파도처럼)	HAP; Silver G	HAP; Silver G	Sondia	4:04
2.	"Like a Wave" (그저 난 파도처럼; Inst.)		HAP; Silver G		4:04
Total length:					8:08

== Viewership ==
The First Man : South Korea viewers per episode (thousands)

Episodes	Episode number																								
Episodes	1	2	3	4	5	6	7	8	9	10	11	12	13	14	15	16	17	18	19	20	21	22	23	24	25
1–25	879	806	866	911	916	967	980	844	996	928	873	914	829	968	948	834	1002	838	936	892	970	895	893	893	882
26–50	968	900	982	856	911	963	897	916	888	983	959	995	983	936	990	895	949	920	867	655	813	1035	1066	931	1065
51–75	1048	939	950	997	1092	1034	1006	1043	1048	977	1019	894	992	1023	887	940	673	1031	1032	900	958	1007	1040	994	958
76–100	937	977	1026	992	881	1017	928	1024	997	880	954	957	1034	960	932	1023	904	1110	1044	883	1042	947	863	942	885
101–120	828	827	1042	898	798	954	915	928	909	1006	968	848	1086	974	1015	997	915	988	971	939	–				
121–140	862	997	1016	1012	1020	989	1044	960	956	950	1014	1125	1030	988	1020	1107	1006	1127	1026	1064	–				

Source: Audience measurement performed nationwide by Nielsen Korea.

Average TV viewership ratings
Ep.	Original broadcast date	Average audience share	
Ep.	Original broadcast date	Nielsen Korea	
Ep.	Original broadcast date	Nationwide	Seoul
1	December 15, 2025	4.9% (8th)	4.6% (7th)
2	December 16, 2025	4.5% (8th)	4.3% (7th)
3	December 17, 2025	5.1% (9th)	5.1% (8th)
4	December 18, 2025	5.3% (8th)	5.2% (8th)
5	December 19, 2025	5.2% (10th)	5.4% (7th)
6	December 22, 2025	5.2% (9th)	5.2% (6th)
7	December 23, 2025	5.5% (8th)	5.1% (7th)
8	December 24, 2025	4.7% (8th)	5.0% (6th)
9	December 25, 2025	5.6% (7th)	5.6% (6th)
10	December 26, 2025	5.1% (10th)	5.4% (8th)
11	December 29, 2025	5.0% (9th)	4.7% (9th)
12	December 30, 2025	5.5% (7th)	5.5% (5th)
13	December 31, 2025	4.6% (10th)	4.6% (8th)
14	January 1, 2026	5.0% (10th)	4.9% (9th)
15	January 2, 2026	5.0% (10th)	5.0% (9th)
16	January 5, 2026	5.0% (9th)	4.7% (6th)
17	January 6, 2026	5.6% (8th)	5.2% (6th)
18	January 7, 2026	5.0% (8th)	4.6% (7th)
19	January 8, 2026	5.1% (8th)	4.6% (6th)
20	January 9, 2026	5.0% (10th)	4.6% (10th)
21	January 12, 2026	5.5% (9th)	5.2% (7th)
22	January 13, 2026	4.9% (8th)	4.7% (7th)
23	January 14, 2026	5.0% (8th)	4.8% (7th)
24	January 15, 2026	5.1% (7th)	4.7% (7th)
25	January 16, 2026	5.1% (8th)	4.7% (10th)
26	January 19, 2026	5.4% (9th)	5.5% (6th)
27	January 20, 2026	5.3% (8th)	5.2% (7th)
28	January 22, 2026	5.4% (8th)	5.0% (7th)
29	January 23, 2026	4.8% (10th)	4.9% (9th)
30	January 26, 2026	5.2% (9th)	5.0% (7th)
31	January 27, 2026	5.3% (7th)	5.0% (6th)
32	January 28, 2026	5.1% (8th)	4.5% (9th)
33	January 29, 2026	5.1% (8th)	4.8% (7th)
34	January 30, 2026	5.0% (10th)	4.8% (8th)
35	February 2, 2026	5.2% (9th)	4.9% (9th)
36	February 3, 2026	5.1% (8th)	4.8% (8th)
37	February 4, 2026	5.3% (8th)	4.8% (7th)
38	February 5, 2026	5.4% (8th)	4.9% (6th)
39	February 6, 2026	5.1% (10th)	5.0% (8th)
40	February 9, 2026	5.2% (8th)	4.7% (7th)
41	February 10, 2026	4.9% (8th)	4.5% (8th)
42	February 11, 2026	5.1% (7th)	4.7% (7th)
43	February 12, 2026	5.1% (8th)	4.7% (7th)
44	February 13, 2026	4.8% (10th)	4.8% (9th)
45	February 16, 2026	3.5% (10th)	3.6% (9th)
46	February 17, 2026	4.2% (10th)	4.1% (8th)
47	February 18, 2026	5.5% (7th)	5.9% (4th)
48	February 19, 2026	5.9% (6th)	5.5% (5th)
49	February 20, 2026	5.2% (8th)	5.2% (6th)
50	February 23, 2026	5.6% (7th)	5.4% (6th)
51	February 24, 2026	5.9% (6th)	5.2% (6th)
52	February 25, 2026	5.2% (7th)	4.7% (7th)
53	February 26, 2026	5.4% (7th)	5.4% (6th)
54	February 27, 2026	5.4% (8th)	5.0% (7th)
55	March 2, 2026	5.7% (7th)	5.5% (5th)
56	March 3, 2026	5.5% (7th)	5.1% (6th)
57	March 4, 2026	5.9% (7th)	5.5% (7th)
58	March 6, 2026	5.8% (6th)	5.8% (5th)
59	March 10, 2026	5.9% (6th)	5.5% (6th)
60	March 11, 2026	5.4% (7th)	5.0% (7th)
61	March 12, 2026	5.4% (7th)	4.7% (6th)
62	March 13, 2026	4.8% (9th)	4.6% (9th)
63	March 16, 2026	5.6% (6th)	5.3% (6th)
64	March 17, 2026	5.4% (6th)	5.1% (6th)
65	March 18, 2026	4.9% (7th)	4.1% (8th)
66	March 19, 2026	5.3% (6th)	5.0% (6th)
67	March 20, 2026	3.6% (13th)	3.4% (13th)
68	March 23, 2026	5.7% (6th)	5.1% (6th)
69	March 24, 2026	5.6% (6th)	5.3% (6th)
70	March 25, 2026	4.9% (7th)	4.4% (7th)
71	March 26, 2026	5.3% (6th)	5.1% (6th)
72	March 27, 2026	5.2% (7th)	4.9% (7th)
73	March 30, 2026	5.7% (8th)	4.9% (6th)
74	March 31, 2026	5.6% (7th)	5.0% (6th)
75	April 1, 2026	5.4% (7th)	5.0% (7th)
76	April 2, 2026	5.3% (6th)	5.0% (6th)
77	April 3, 2026	5.4% (6th)	5.2% (6th)
78	April 6, 2026	5.9% (6th)	5.5% (6th)
79	April 7, 2026	5.4% (8th)	4.9% (6th)
80	April 8, 2026	4.8% (8th)	4.7% (6th)
81	April 9, 2026	5.7% (7th)	5.5% (5th)
82	April 10, 2026	5.2% (9th)	5.0% (8th)
83	April 13, 2026	5.7% (7th)	5.3% (6th)
84	April 14, 2026	5.5% (6th)	5.2% (5th)
85	April 15, 2026	5.0% (8th)	4.7% (6th)
86	April 16, 2026	5.3% (6th)	5.3% (5th)
87	April 17, 2026	5.3% (7th)	4.8% (8th)
88	April 20, 2026	5.8% (6th)	5.5% (5th)
89	April 21, 2026	5.4% (7th)	5.5% (5th)
90	April 22, 2026	5.2% (7th)	4.7% (7th)
91	April 23, 2026	5.4% (6th)	5.2% (5th)
92	April 24, 2026	4.9% (9th)	4.5% (9th)
93	April 27, 2026	6.0% (6th)	5.8% (5th)
94	April 28, 2026	5.6% (7th)	5.7% (5th)
95	April 29, 2026	4.9% (8th)	4.7% (7th)
96	April 30, 2026	5.5% (5th)	5.1% (5th)
97	May 1, 2026	4.8% (8th)	5.0% (7th)
98	May 4, 2026	4.8% (10th)	4.5% (9th)
99	May 5, 2026	5.1% (7th)	4.6% (6th)
100	May 6, 2026	4.8% (8th)	4.4% (7th)
101	May 7, 2026	4.9% (7th)	4.7% (6th)
102	May 8, 2026	4.5% (7th)	4.3% (8th)
103	May 11, 2026	5.6% (6th)	5.7% (6th)
104	May 12, 2026	4.9% (8th)	4.2% (7th)
105	May 13, 2026	4.4% (8th)	4.0% (7th)
106	May 14, 2026	5.1% (5th)	4.7% (5th)
107	May 15, 2026	4.9% (8th)	4.2% (9th)
108	May 18, 2026	5.1% (7th)	4.5% (6th)
109	May 19, 2026	5.0% (6th)	4.8% (5th)
110	May 20, 2026	5.5% (7th)	5.3% (5th)
111	May 21, 2026	5.2% (6th)	4.6% (6th)
112	May 22, 2026	4.5% (8th)	4.4% (8th)
113	May 25, 2026	5.5% (7th)	5.3% (5th)
114	May 26, 2026	5.2% (8th)	4.9% (6th)
115	May 27, 2026	5.6% (7th)	5.2% (5th)
116	May 28, 2026	5.4% (6th)	5.5% (4th)
117	May 29, 2026	5.1% (7th)	5.0% (8th)
118	June 1, 2026	5.6% (6th)	5.2% (5th)
119	June 2, 2026	5.4% (6th)	5.1% (5th)
120	June 4, 2026	5.4% (5th)	5.4% (4th)
121	June 5, 2026	4.8% (6th)	4.3% (8th)
122	June 8, 2026	5.4% (6th)	4.9% (5th)
123	June 9, 2026	5.5% (5th)	4.6% (5th)
124	June 10, 2026	5.4% (6th)	4.7% (5th)
125	June 11, 2026	5.5% (5th)	4.7% (5th)
126	June 12, 2026	5.3% (8th)	5.2% (8th)
127	June 15, 2026	5.7% (5th)	5.4% (4th)
128	June 16, 2026	5.2% (5th)	4.8% (5th)
129	June 17, 2026	5.2% (6th)	4.6% (6th)
130	June 18, 2026	5.1% (6th)	4.8% (6th)
131	June 19, 2026	6.0% (5th)	5.5% (6th)
132	June 22, 2026	6.1% (5th)	5.4% (4th)
133	June 23, 2026	5.6% (5th)	5.0% (5th)
134	June 24, 2026	5.4% (5th)	5.1% (4th)
135	June 25, 2026	5.5% (6th)	5.3% (6th)
136	June 26, 2026	6.0% (4th)	5.7% (6th)
137	June 29, 2026	5.8% (5th)	5.6% (6th)
138	June 30, 2026	6.3% (5th)	6.1% (3rd)
139	July 1, 2026	5.9% (6th)	5.4% (4th)
140	July 2, 2026	6.0% (5th)	5.4% (4th)
Average		5.3%	5.0%
In the table above, the blue numbers represent the lowest ratings and the red numbers represent the highest ratings.
