= White: Melody of Death =

2011 South Korean horror film

White: The Melody Of The Curse
- Film poster
- Hangul: 화이트: 저주의 멜로디
- RR: Hwaiteu: jeojuui mellodi
- MR: Hwait'ŭ: chŏjuŭi mellodi
- Directed by: Kim Gok; Kim Sun
- Written by: Kim Gok; Kim Sun
- Starring: Hahm Eun-jung; Hwang Woo-seul-hye; May Doni Kim; Choi Ah-ra; Jin Se-yeon
- Production company: DOO Entertainment
- Distributed by: CJ Entertainment
- Release date: June 7, 2011
- Running time: 106 minutes
- Country: South Korea
- Language: Korean
- Box office: US$5,299,831

White: Melody of Death (Korean: 화이트: 저주의 멜로디; RR: Hwaiteu: jeojuui mellodi, lit. White: The Melody of the Curse) is a 2011 South Korean horror film directed by Kim Gok and Kim Sun.

The film was pre-sold in Malaysia and Singapore with the teaser trailer and poster released at the Hong Kong Film Mart. The movie was a commercial success grossing US$5,3 Million and ending up being the highest-grossing horror movie and among Top 30 highest-grossing movies in South Korea in 2011.

== Plot ==
The girl group Pink Dolls, which consists of members Je-ni, A-rang, Shin-ji, and Eun-ju, makes their stage debut but fails to achieve popularity. They and the record company relocate to a renovated studio that had been burned in a fire 15 years prior. Eun-ju's sponsor, Mr. Choi, who funds an idol or group on the condition that they perform sexual favors, is credited for the move and subsequent renovations. Eun-ju is bullied by the other three members for her involvement with Mr. Choi, her past as a backup dancer, and her age, and she considers quitting. Her vocal trainer and best friend, Soon-ye, encourages her to remain in the group as she believes they will find success and gain attention with their new song. While cleaning up in the dance rehearsal room, Eun-ju finds a VHS tape titled "WHITE", containing unfinished music video footage. When Eun-ju plays the video in her dorm room, she is discovered by the group's manager, who demands that the group be permitted to remake the song as their next single.

The Pink Dolls become overnight sensations with a live performance of "White," with Soon-ye doubling as a singer for Je-ni's high notes. The song goes viral across the country. Their manager announces that the group will re-record the song and give it a music video, with one of the girls as the "main" focus. Tensions quickly rise between Je-ni, A-rang, and Shin-ji, who become jealous and hostile toward each other as they fight over the "main" spot. Je-ni is initially chosen for the "main" role but is forced to overdose on her medication, after which she is mysteriously strangled with microphone cords during a vocal session. A-rang is chosen to take her spot, only to be poisoned by her cosmetics and then attacked by a hostile white-haired ghost during filming for the music video, causing her to fall and be hospitalized alongside Je-ni. Shin-ji is then chosen, but during filming for a survival reality show, the same apparition attacks her, which incites a riot among the spectators of the show that results in Shin-ji being caught and crushed in the camera equipment. She joins the others in the hospital.

Fearing the song is cursed and that she will be the next victim, Eun-ju accompanies Soon-ye and her record producer, Tae-Yong, to examine hidden images within the video. They come to believe that a trainee named Jang Ye-bin, who died before the studio caught fire, wrote the song. Eun-ju questions Mr. Choi, who informs her that Ye-bin committed suicide. After despondently leaving and returning to the rehearsal room, Eun-ju is menaced by the white-haired ghost and faints. When she awakens the next morning, she finds a suicide note beside power sockets that may have started the fire. Eun-ju and Soon-ye take a priest to Ye-bin's grave, blessing it and asking her to move on. As they leave, however, they do not notice that the glass in a memorial photo of Ye-bin shatters ominously.

After feeling confident that the curse has been broken, Eun-ju takes credit for the song and plans to reinvent her image as a solo artist by dying her hair, dressing in white, and using the stage name "White". However, she becomes arrogant and insists that she is the only one responsible for "White"'s success, which alienates her from Soon-ye. Eun-ju prepares for her live debut as a solo act while the other members are relegated to being hosts of a tacky music show. A frustrated Soon-ye starts destroying the documents they had found regarding "White", only to realize that there is something wrong with the video.

She takes the video to Tae-Yong, and the two examine subliminal messages within the song. They deduce that Ye-bin is not the actual singer of the song and that there is another figure in the video that they had not noticed. At the same time, they receive an emergency phone call from the television producer of the music show, who frantically tells them Je-ni, A-rang, and Shin-ji have gone into a trance while hosting, muttering about being "hot" before drinking bleach and dying live on air. Soon-ye attempts to call Eun-ju, who is on the way to a venue to perform "White," to warn her that the curse is not over, but Eun-ju begrudgingly ignores her. Tae-Yong and Soon-ye investigate further and discover that the true writer of the song is not Ye-bin but a backup dancer who had been bullied by Ye-bin. Ye-bin had disfigured the girl with acid, causing the girl to commit suicide by drinking bleach; her spirit, however, remains as a vengeful ghost. It is also revealed that the ghost's first victim was Ye-bin herself, who was killed by the ghost while she was trying to burn evidence that the girl had written the song. This resulted in the fire burning down the entire studio.

Realizing the truth, Soon-ye rushes to the venue to rescue Eun-ju, but she cannot enter as the doors are locked. During Eun-ju's performance, all of the stage lights go out, and the electricity in the venue begins to malfunction. Eun-ju's manager and Mr. Choi try to get her off the stage, but they are both killed by stage equipment, and the white-haired ghost attempts to attack her. Afterward, the doors all open, and the panicking crowd starts to rush out of the building. Soon-ye enters the venue, and she and Eun-ju attempt to reunite, but Eun-ju trips in the crowd and is trampled to death. The electrical malfunction eventually sets the venue on fire. After the incident, Soon-ye mourns Eun-ju's death while destroying all of the remaining evidence of the song in the studio's karaoke room. As she burns the evidence, however, Soon-ye is horrified to see the karaoke machine announce that the next song is "White."

== Cast ==
- Hahm Eun-jung as Eun-ju, the de facto leader of the Pink Dolls who is a former backup dancer
- Hwang Woo-seul-hye as Soon-ye, a vocal trainer and Eun-ju's best friend
- Jin Se-yeon as Je-ni, a lead singer who is insecure about hitting high notes
- Choi Ah-ra as A-rang, a visual/singer who is addicted to plastic surgery
- May Doni Kim as Shin-ji, a rapper/dancer who cannot sing but is talented at dancing
- After School as Pure
- Byun Jung-soo as Talent Agent
- Kim Young-min as Lee Tae-Yong, a record producer who helps Soon-ye investigate the curse of "White"
- Kim Ki-bang as Manager
- Yoo Mo-ri as Jang Ye-bin
- Kim Soo-Hyun as White
- Lee Jun-ho as Music Fever host
- Seo Hyun-woo

== Soundtrack ==
The soundtrack was released on May 5, 2011 and contain Pink Dolls' version of the song "White", performed by Hahm Eun-jung, May Doni Kim, Choi Ah-ra, and Jin Se-yeon. While the original version (the one featured on the VHS tape) and the solo version by Eun-ju (Hahm Eun-jung) were included in the film, they were not released as a part of the soundtrack album.

== Reception ==
=== Box office ===
The film grossed US$1,265,702 its opening weekend landing at the fifth position of the box office chart. In total the film grossed US$5,299,831 by the end of its theatrical run. The film received a total of 791,133 admissions nationwide.

=== Accolades ===
Year	Award	Category	Recipients	Result	Ref
2011	The 30th Vancouver International Film Festival	—N/a	White: The Melody of the Curse	Nominated	
2012	16th Fantasia International Film Festival	Feature film	White: The Melody of the Curse	Nominated	
2013	The 6th FILM LIVE: KT&G Music Film Festival	—N/a	White: The Melody of the Curse	Nominated	
2016	14th Florence Korean Film Festival	—N/a	White: The Melody of the Curse	Nominated	

=== Listicles ===
Publisher	Year	List	Recipient	Rank	Ref
SlashFilm	2018	The Best South Korean Horror Movies You've Never Seen	White: The Melody of the Curse	Placed	
India Times	2020	Best Korean Horror Films	White: The Melody of the Curse	Placed	
OTAKUKART	2021	Top Ten Horror Korean Movies of All Time	White: The Melody of the Curse	5th	
Rolling Stone India	2022	15 Creepy Korean Horror Films You Must See	White: The Melody of the Curse	Placed	
Scoop Whoop	2022	8 Best Korean Horror Films To Watch	White: The Melody of the Curse	4th	
WION	2023	15 spine-chilling Korean movies	White: The Melody of the Curse	15th	
Creepy Catalog	2023	The 30 Best Korean Horror Movies	White: The Melody of the Curse	Placed	
OTAKUKART	2023	50 Best South Korean Horror Movies of All Time	White: The Melody of the Curse	Placed	

== Release ==
White was released on DVD in Japan on March 2, 2012, by NBC Universal. A re-issue was released in the same country on July 21, 2017.
