= Coffee House (TV series) =

2010 South Korean television series

- Promotional poster
- Hangul: 커피하우스
- RR: Keopi hauseu
- MR: K'ŏp'i hausŭ
- Created by: Seoul Broadcasting System
- Written by: Song Jae-jeong
- Directed by: Pyo Min-soo
- Starring: Kang Ji-hwan; Park Si-yeon; Hahm Eun-jung; Jung Woong-in
- Country of origin: South Korea
- No. of episodes: 18

Production
- Running time: Mondays and Tuesdays at 20:45 (KST)
- Production company: Mnet Media Corp.

Original release
- Network: SBS
- Release: 17 May – 27 July 2010

Coffee House (Korean: 커피하우스) is a 2010 South Korean television series starring Kang Ji-hwan, Park Si-yeon, Hahm Eun-jung, and Jung Woong-in. It aired on SBS from May 17 to July 27, 2010 on Mondays and Tuesdays at 20:45 for 18 episodes.

The early working title was Page One (페이지원).

== Plot ==
Lee Jin-soo made it big after writing several thriller novels and establishing himself as a talented novelist. He works for Seo Eun-young, the owner of the biggest publishing company in Korea, and has a long-time friendship with her. Jin-soo has many fans, especially female, and he seems to be the perfect match for any woman... but what no one knows is that he is actually a bit weird and sarcastic, has many strange habits, and holds a dark secret. His secretary, Kang Seung-yeon, has to cope with him and his habits. She begged him for this job to become a pro instead of the below-average girl that she really is. On top of that, there is also the return of Han Ji-won, Eun-young's ex-fiancé, whom she despises. Ji-won tries to win Eun-young back, but she has her eyes set on Jin-soo.

== Cast ==
- Kang Ji-hwan as Lee Jin-soo
- Park Si-yeon as Seo Eun-young
- Hahm Eun-jung as Kang Seung-yeon
- Jung Woong-in as Han Ji-won
- Park Jae-jung as Kim Dong-wook
- Jung Soo-young as Oh Hyun-joo
- Jung Ji-ah as Go Yoon-joo
- Jin Sung as Park Young-chul
- Heo Tae-hee as Dong-min
- Ahn Gil-kang as Kang Jin-man (Seung-yeon's father)
- Kim Ji-young as Hong Bong-nyeo (Seung-yeon's grandmother)
- Kim Min-sang as Kang Seung-chul (Seung-yeon's brother)
- Lee Soon-jae as Eun-young's grandfather
- Kim Hye-eun as Eun-young's friend
- Won Ki-joon as Hyun-seok
- Jung Joon-ho (cameo, ep. 1-2)

== Reception ==
Coffee House is one of the most watched South Korean dramas on Chinese video streaming platform Youku with over 10,000,000 views and an average of 500,000 views per episode (As of November 2015).

== Ratings ==
Ep.	Original broadcast date	Average audience share	
Ep.	Original broadcast date	AGB Nielsen	
Ep.	Original broadcast date	Nationwide	Seoul
1	May 17, 2010	8.8% (16th)	8.7% (16th)
2	May 8, 2010	8.7% (NR)	8.9% (NR)
3	May 24, 2010	8.5% (NR)	8.9% (NR)
4	May 25, 2010	7.8% (19th)	8.2% (15th)
5	May 31, 2010	9.7% (15th)	9.7% (12th)
6	June 1, 2010	9.3% (12th)	9.4% (12th)
7	June 7, 2010	8.5% (19th)	8.7% (18th)
8	June 8, 2010	8.7% (16th)	9.4% (14th)
9	June 28, 2010	8.1% (NR)	7.6% (NR)
10	June 29, 2010	8.3% (NR)	7.7% (NR)
11	July 5, 2010	8.4% (19th)	8.7% (14th)
12	July 6, 2010	8.0% (17th)	8.2% (17th)
13	July 12, 2010	8.8% (NR)	9.1% (20th)
14	July 13, 2010	10.1% (12th)	10.6% (11th)
15	July 19, 2010	8.9% (17th)	9.4% (16th)
16	July 20, 2010	9.7% (12th)	10.4% (13th)
17	July 26, 2010	8.5% (19th)	9.0% (16th)
18	July 27, 2010	8.3% (19th)	8.6% (17th)
Average		8.7%	9.9%
In this table, the blue numbers represent the lowest ratings and the red numbers represent the highest ratings.

Source: TNS Media Korea

== Original soundtrack ==
Album Tracklist
No.	Title	Artist	Length
1.	"Page One (Part 1)" (페이지원)	SG Wannabe & Ock Joo-hyun	3:46
2.	"웃을께"	Jo Sung-mo	3:37
3.	"난 이별을 모를래요"	Hwang Ji-hyeon	4:07
4.	"Page One (Part 2)" (페이지원)	Soyeon (T-ara) & Ock Joo-hyun	3:54
5.	"Coffee House" (커피하우스)	Eunjung (T-ara)	3:00
6.	"Coffee House (Guitar Ver.)" (커피하우스)		3:34
7.	"웃을께 (Inst.)"		4:19
8.	"Page One (Part 1) (Inst.)" (페이지원)		3:16
Total length:			43:46

== Awards and nominations ==
Year	Award	Category	Recipient	Result	Ref.
2010	17th SBS Drama Awards	Excellence Award - Actor (Special Planning Drama)	Kang Ji-hwan	Nominated	
2010	17th SBS Drama Awards	Excellence Award - Actress (Special Planning Drama)	Park Si-yeon	Nominated	
2010	17th SBS Drama Awards	Best Supporting Actor (Special Planning Drama)	Jung Woong-in	Nominated	
2010	17th SBS Drama Awards	New Star Award	Hahm Eun-jung	Won	
2010	17th SBS Drama Awards	Netizen's drama of the year	Coffee House	Nominated	
2010	6th Innolife Entertainment Japan Awards	Best Drama	Coffee House	Won	
2010	6th Innolife Entertainment Japan Awards	Best Actor	Kang Ji-hwan	Won	
2010	DramaBeans Awards	Favourite Drama of 2010	Coffee House	Nominated	
2010	DramaBeans Awards	Favourite Comedic Drama	Coffee House	Nominated	
2010	DramaBeans Awards	Favourite Lead Couple	Coffee House	Nominated	
2010	DramaBeans Awards	Best Kiss	Kang Ji-hwan & Park Si-yeon	Nominated	
2010	DramaBeans Awards	Favourite Alternate Pairing	Kang Ji-hwan & Hahm Eun-jung	Nominated	
2010	DramaBeans Awards	Underrated Drama of The Year	Coffee House	Nominated	
2010	DramaBeans Awards	Best Use of an Idol Star	Hahm Eun-jung	Nominated	
2010	Bugs Music Awards	Best Drama OST	"Page One"	Nominated	
2011	6th Seoul International Drama Awards	Outstanding Korean Actor	Kang Ji-hwan	Nominated	

== International broadcast ==
Premiere	Network	Region	Name	Notes	Ref
October 25, 2010	TVB J2	Hong Kong	茶煲老细		
January 12, 2011	Satellite TV	Taiwan	咖啡情缘 (Coffee Love)		
September 6, 2011	Modernine TV	Thailand	Coffee House		
February 4, 2013	TVB J2	Hong Kong	茶煲老细	Re-run	
July 12, 2013	FOX TV	Taiwan	咖啡情缘 (Coffee Love)		
October 5, 2014	Voice TV	Thailand	Coffee House		

== Media release ==
The series was made into 2 DVD Box sets and released in Japan on January 19 and February 16, 2011 under Pony Canyon.
