= I'm Good (Hahm Eun-jung EP) =

EP by Elsie (Eunjung)
- Released: May 7, 2015; October 30, 2015 (Re-issue Edition)
- Recorded: 2015
- Genre: K-pop; R&B; ballad
- Length: 18:12; 36:52 (Re-issue edition)
- Label: MBK; Kakao M; Interpark INT
- Producer: Duble Sidekick

Elsie (Eunjung) chronology
I'm Good (2015)	Desire (2019)

Re-issue edition cover

Singles from I'm Good
- 1. "I'm Good (featuring K.Will)" Released: May 1, 2015; 2. "Goodbye" Released: October 13, 2015

I'm Good is the debut extended play by South Korean singer, Elsie (also known as Eunjung), a member of T-ara. The EP was released on May 7, 2015, by MBK Entertainment with the title track I'm Good, featuring popular singer K.Will.

On October 30, 2015, the EP was re-released under the title Goodbye with the title track as the same name.

== Release ==
On May 7, 2015, Elsie released her debut extended play "I'm Good", featuring popular singer K.Will. Elsie also released the Korean and Chinese version of the title track "I'm Good" on May 26, 2015. The music video was starred by her labelmate KI-O (former SPEED's member). He also featured in her live performances.

On October 13, 2015, Elsie released the soundtrack for T-ara web drama Sweet Temptation titled "Goodbye", along with two music videos for the Korean and Chinese versions. Elsie later re-released the EP as a limited edition album, with the title track "Goodbye" on October 30.

== Commercial performance ==
The Korean music video for "Goodbye" reached at #1 for weekly chart and #3 for monthly chart on China's YinYueTai V Chart. It was also included in the list of "Best songs to listen to in October 2015" by TV Report.

== Track listing ==
No.	Title	Lyrics	Music	Arrangement	Length
1.	"I'm Good" (featuring K.Will)	이단옆차기, 데이데이(Dayday), Long Candy	이단옆차기, 황금두현, 머스탱	황금두현, 머스탱	3:50
2.	"Tearsdrop" (눈물비)	e.one	e.one, EJ Show	e.one, EJ Show	3:57
3.	"Love Effect"	Monster Factory, 양승욱	Monster Factory, 양승욱	Monster Factory, 양승욱	3:26
4.	"I'm Good" (Solo Version)	이단옆차기, 데이데이(Dayday), Long Candy	이단옆차기, 황금두현, 머스탱	황금두현, 머스탱	3:09
5.	"I'm Good" (Instrumental)		이단옆차기, 황금두현, 머스탱	황금두현, 머스탱	3:50
Total length:					18:12

Goodbye - Re-issue edition
No.	Title	Lyrics	Music	Arrangement	Length
1.	"Goodbye"	로코, 안영민	안영민	로코, 안영민	3:05
2.	"Goodbye" (Chinese Version)	로코, 안영민	안영민	로코, 안영민	3:06
3.	"I'm Good" (featuring K.Will)	이단옆차기, 데이데이(Dayday), Long Candy	이단옆차기, 황금두현, 머스탱	황금두현, 머스탱	3:50
4.	"I'm Good" (Solo Version)	이단옆차기, 데이데이(Dayday), Long Candy	이단옆차기, 황금두현, 머스탱	황금두현, 머스탱	3:09
5.	"I'm Good" (Chinese Version)	이단옆차기, 데이데이(Dayday), Long Candy	이단옆차기, 황금두현, 머스탱	황금두현, 머스탱	3:09
6.	"Tearsdrop" (눈물비)	e.one	e.one, EJ Show	e.one, EJ Show	3:57
7.	"Love Effect"	Monster Factory, 양승욱	Monster Factory, 양승욱	Monster Factory, 양승욱	3:26
8.	"Goodbye" (Instrumental)		안영민	로코, 안영민	3:05
9.	"Goodbye" (Chinese Version) (Instrumental)		안영민	로코, 안영민	3:06
10.	"I'm Good" (Instrumental)		이단옆차기, 황금두현, 머스탱	황금두현, 머스탱	3:50
11.	"I'm Good" (Solo Version) (Instrumental)		이단옆차기, 황금두현, 머스탱	황금두현, 머스탱	3:09
Total length:					36:52

== Chart performance ==
Chart	Peak position
Gaon Weekly albums chart	6
Gaon Monthly albums chart	14

== Accolades ==
=== Awards and nominations ===
Award ceremony	Year	Category	Nominee / Work	Result	Ref.
V Chart Awards	2016	Favorite Female Artist – Korea	I'm Good	Won	
V Chart Awards	2016	Favourite Artist of the Year	I'm Good	Nominated	

=== Listicles ===
Year	Publisher	List	Nominee / Work	Rank	Ref.
2015	Billboard	K-Pop's Best 2015 Solo Debuts	"I'm Good"	9th	

== Release history ==
Edition	Date	Region	Format	Label
I'm Good	May 7, 2015	South Korea	CD, digital download	MBK Entertainment; LOEN Entertainment; Interpark
I'm Good	May 7, 2015	Worldwide	Digital download	MBK Entertainment; LOEN Entertainment
Goodbye	October 30, 2015	South Korea	CD, digital download	MBK Entertainment; LOEN Entertainment; Interpark
Goodbye	October 13, 2015	Worldwide	Digital download	MBK Entertainment; LOEN Entertainment
