= Queen's House (TV series) =

2025 South Korean television series

- promotional poster
- Hangul: 여왕의 집
- RR: Yeowangui jip
- MR: Yŏwangŭi chip
- Genre: Melodrama; Revenge; Romance; Thriller
- Written by: Kim Minjoo
- Directed by: Hong Seok-gu; Hong Eun-mi
- Starring: Hahm Eun-jung; Seo Jun-young; Park Yoon-jae; Lee Ga-ryeong
- Music by: Choi Cheol-ho
- Country of origin: South Korea
- Original language: Korean
- No. of episodes: 100

Production
- Executive producers: Lee Jeong-mi (CP); Kang jin; Im Jang-hyun
- Producers: Seok Shin-ho; Park Sung-jin; Yoo Je-il; Han Seung-il; Jeon Hye-jun
- Running time: 30 minutes
- Production companies: Flying Entertainment; Ascendio
- Budget: ₩3.35 billion

Original release
- Network: KBS2
- Release: April 28 – September 19, 2025

Queen's House (Korean: 여왕의 집) is a 2025 South Korean television series starring Hahm Eun-jung, Seo Jun-young, Park Yoon-jae, and Lee Ga-ryeong. It aired on KBS2 from April 28, to September 19, 2025, every Monday to Friday at 19:50 (KST).

== Synopsis ==
Kang Jae-in's life hits rock bottom after discovering her husband Hwang Ki-chan's affair with her best friend Kang Se-ri. Not only that, but she's also reeling from the loss of her father and the tragic death of her son, who was mistakenly killed in a premeditated attack meant for her, leaving her world turned upside down. Driven by betrayal and a thirst for justice, she wants to expose the truth behind her loved ones' deaths, which she believes were orchestrated by the cheating couple, Ki-chan and Se-ri. She starts seeking revenge against them by gathering evidence and is determined to reclaim her rightful inheritance.

== Cast ==
=== Main ===
- Ham Eun-jung as Kang Jae-in

The youngest design team leader at YL Group.

- Seo Jun-young as Kim Do-yoon

A thoracic surgeon. After losing a loved one in an accident, he seeks revenge.

- Park Yoon-jae as Hwang Ki-chan

Jae-in's ex-husband, who stole her father's company, became a director of YL Group's strategic planning team.

- Lee Ga-ryeong as Kang Se-ri

Jae-in's ex-best friend who destroyed her marriage and family. She's a designer at YL Group.

=== Supporting ===
- Nam Keong-eup as Kang Gyu-cheol (Ep1~16)
- Lee Sang-sook as Choi Ja-young

Jae-in's mother.

- Kim Si-woo as Hwang Eun-ho

Hwang Ki-chan's and Kang Jae-in's son.

- Lee Bo-hee as No Seok-ja

Hwang Ki-chan's mother.

- Park Chan-hwan as Do Min-joon
- Kang Kyung-heon as Kang Mi-ran
- Kim Ae-ran as Jeong Yoon-hee
- Kim Hyun-gyun as Jeong Oh-seong
- Kang Sung-min as Hwang Ki-man
- Cha Min-ji as Do Yu-kyung
- Choi Seol-ah as Kim Bo-ram (Ep2~100)
- Kwon Yul as Hwang Ji-ho

== Production ==
Queen's House is written by Kim Min-ji, who wrote Sunny Again Tomorrow (2018) and Gold Mask (2022), and co-directed by Hong Seok-gu and Hong Eun-mi. It is produced by Flying Entertainment and Ascendio.

== Viewership ==
Queen's House : South Korea viewers per episode (millions)

Episodes	Episode number																								
Episodes	1	2	3	4	5	6	7	8	9	10	11	12	13	14	15	16	17	18	19	20	21	22	23	24	25
1–25	1.506	1.426	1.424	1.477	1.533	1.296	1.543	1.505	1.398	1.486	1.451	1.396	1.414	1.420	1.529	1.422	1.546	1.447	1.435	1.403	1.482	1.573	1.602	1.512	1.609
26–50	1.692	1.324	1.564	1.609	1.217	1.680	1.529	1.492	1.535	1.650	1.771	1.530	1.586	1.523	1.684	1.559	1.736	1.773	1.541	1.621	1.582	1.946	1.728	1.709	1.920
51–75	1.679	1.713	1.780	1.685	1.605	1.921	1.679	1.810	1.892	1.764	1.827	1.762	1.804	1.922	1.699	1.747	1.838	1.822	1.846	1.923	1.868	1.836	1.809	1.801	1.862
76–100	1.917	1.847	N/A	1.905	1.864	1.907	1.906	1.855	1.936	1.940	1.963	1.829	1.941	1.830	1.878	1.855	2.010	1.837	1.886	1.972	1.895	2.103	1.841	2.037	2.102

Source: Audience measurement performed nationwide by Nielsen Korea.

Average TV viewership ratings
Ep.	Original broadcast date	Average audience share	
Ep.	Original broadcast date	Nielsen Korea	
Ep.	Original broadcast date	Nationwide	Seoul
1	April 28, 2025	8.6% (2nd)	7.4% (3rd)
2	April 29, 2025	7.8% (2nd)	6.4% (3rd)
3	April 30, 2025	7.7% (2nd)	6.5% (4th)
4	May 1, 2025	8.2% (2nd)	6.5% (4th)
5	May 2, 2025	8.1% (3rd)	6.7% (3rd)
6	May 5, 2025	7.4% (2nd)	6.3% (3rd)
7	May 6, 2025	8.3% (2nd)	6.6% (4th)
8	May 7, 2025	8.1% (2nd)	6.6% (3rd)
9	May 8, 2025	7.6% (4th)	6.5% (4th)
10	May 9, 2025	8.2% (4th)	6.6% (5th)
11	May 12, 2025	8.3% (2nd)	7.1% (2nd)
12	May 13, 2025	7.9% (3rd)	6.4% (3rd)
13	May 14, 2025	8.0% (3rd)	6.3% (4th)
14	May 15, 2025	8.2% (2nd)	7.2% (3rd)
15	May 16, 2025	8.6% (3rd)	6.9% (5th)
16	May 19, 2025	8.3% (2nd)	7.1% (5th)
17	May 20, 2025	8.8% (2nd)	7.1% (2nd)
18	May 21, 2025	8.6% (2nd)	7.3% (3rd)
19	May 22, 2025	8.4% (2nd)	6.7% (6th)
20	May 23, 2025	8.0% (3rd)	6.9% (3rd)
21	May 26, 2025	8.3% (2nd)	7.1% (3rd)
22	May 27, 2025	8.7% (1st)	7.9% (1st)
23	May 28, 2025	9.2% (2nd)	7.3% (3rd)
24	May 29, 2025	8.7% (2nd)	7.6% (2nd)
25	May 30, 2025	9.2% (3rd)	8.0% (3rd)
26	June 2, 2025	9.6% (2nd)	8.3% (2nd)
27	June 3, 2025	7.4% (6th)	6.3% (6th)
28	June 4, 2025	8.9% (2nd)	7.7% (3rd)
29	June 5, 2025	9.0% (2nd)	8.0% (3rd)
30	June 6, 2025	7.1% (4th)	5.2% (7th)
31	June 9, 2025	9.7% (2nd)	8.5% (3rd)
32	June 10, 2025	9.1% (3rd)	7.6% (3rd)
33	June 11, 2025	8.9% (2nd)	7.4% (3rd)
34	June 12, 2025	8.8% (2nd)	7.3% (4th)
35	June 13, 2025	9.6% (2nd)	8.0% (2nd)
36	June 16, 2025	9.6% (2nd)	7.9% (2nd)
37	June 17, 2025	9.0% (2nd)	7.7% (2nd)
38	June 18, 2025	9.3% (2nd)	7.7% (3rd)
39	June 19, 2025	8.8% (2nd)	7.3% (4th)
40	June 20, 2025	9.5% (2nd)	7.5% (3rd)
41	June 23, 2025	8.8% (2nd)	7.7% (3rd)
42	June 24, 2025	9.8% (2nd)	8.5% (2nd)
43	June 25, 2025	9.7% (2nd)	8.6% (2nd)
44	June 26, 2025	8.6% (2nd)	7.8% (2nd)
45	June 27, 2025	9.1% (2nd)	7.8% (2nd)
46	June 30, 2025	9.1% (2nd)	8.0% (2nd)
47	July 1, 2025	10.5% (2nd)	9.1% (2nd)
48	July 2, 2025	9.7% (2nd)	8.3% (2nd)
49	July 3, 2025	9.5% (2nd)	8.4% (2nd)
50	July 4, 2025	10.3% (2nd)	8.9% (2nd)
51	July 7, 2025	9.6% (2nd)	8.4% (2nd)
52	July 8, 2025	10.1% (2nd)	8.5% (2nd)
53	July 9, 2025	10.0% (2nd)	8.4% (2nd)
54	July 10, 2025	9.5% (2nd)	8.1% (2nd)
55	July 11, 2025	9.4% (2nd)	8.1% (2nd)
56	July 14, 2025	10.5% (2nd)	9.2% (2nd)
57	July 15, 2025	10.0% (2nd)	8.2% (2nd)
58	July 16, 2025	10.3% (2nd)	8.6% (2nd)
59	July 17, 2025	10.4% (2nd)	8.6% (3rd)
60	July 18, 2025	9.8% (2nd)	8.3% (2nd)
61	July 21, 2025	10.3% (2nd)	9.2% (2nd)
62	July 22, 2025	10.3% (2nd)	8.5% (2nd)
63	July 23, 2025	9.8% (2nd)	8.2% (2nd)
64	July 24, 2025	10.4% (2nd)	9.0% (2nd)
65	July 25, 2025	9.7% (2nd)	8.3% (2nd)
66	July 28, 2025	9.8% (2nd)	8.6% (2nd)
67	July 29, 2025	10.2% (1st)	8.9% (1st)
68	July 30, 2025	10.5% (1st)	9.0% (1st)
69	July 31, 2025	10.4% (1st)	9.1% (1st)
70	August 1, 2025	10.7% (1st)	8.9% (1st)
71	August 4, 2025	10.2% (2nd)	8.5% (2nd)
72	August 6, 2025	10.3% (1st)	8.7% (1st)
73	August 7, 2025	10.1% (2nd)	9.0% (2nd)
74	August 8, 2025	9.8% (1st)	8.3% (2nd)
75	August 11, 2025	10.4% (2nd)	8.3% (2nd)
76	August 13, 2025	10.6% (2nd)	9.0% (2nd)
77	August 14, 2025	10.2% (2nd)	8.9% (2nd)
78	August 18, 2025	11.1% (1st)	—N/a
79	August 20, 2025	10.7% (2nd)	8.7% (2nd)
80	August 21, 2025	10.1% (2nd)	8.1% (2nd)
81	August 22, 2025	10.3% (2nd)	8.9% (2nd)
82	August 25, 2025	10.5% (2nd)	9.2% (2nd)
83	August 27, 2025	10.6% (2nd)	9.1% (2nd)
84	August 28, 2025	10.8% (2nd)	9.6% (2nd)
85	August 29, 2025	10.4% (1st)	8.5% (2nd)
86	September 1, 2025	10.6% (2nd)	8.9% (2nd)
87	September 2, 2025	10.2% (2nd)	8.7% (2nd)
88	September 3, 2025	10.9% (2nd)	9.1% (2nd)
89	September 4, 2025	10.4% (2nd)	8.9% (2nd)
90	September 5, 2025	10.3% (2nd)	8.8% (2nd)
91	September 8, 2025	10.7% (2nd)	8.7% (2nd)
92	September 9, 2025	11.1% (2nd)	9.5% (2nd)
93	September 10, 2025	10.6% (2nd)	8.9% (2nd)
94	September 11, 2025	10.9% (2nd)	9.6% (2nd)
95	September 12, 2025	10.9% (2nd)	9.6% (2nd)
96	September 15, 2025	10.7% (2nd)	9.3% (2nd)
97	September 16, 2025	11.9%% (1st)	9.8% (2nd)
98	September 17, 2025	10.8% (2nd)	9.2% (2nd)
99	September 18, 2025	11.8% (2nd)	10.4%% (1st)
100	September 19, 2025	11.7% (1st)	10.4%% (2nd)
Average		—	—
In the table above, the blue numbers represent the lowest ratings and the red numbers represent the highest ratings.

== Awards and nominations ==
Award Ceremony	Year	Category	Recipient	Result	Ref.
APAN Star Awards	2025	Top Excellence Award ㅡ Actress in a Serial Drama	Hahm Eun-jung	Nominated	
APAN Star Awards	2025	Top Excellence Award ㅡ Actor in a Serial Drama	Seo Jun-young	Nominated	
Asia Star Entertainer Awards	2026	Best Leading Actress	Hahm Eun-jung	Nominated	
KBS Drama Awards	2025	Drama of the Year ㅡ Daily Drama	Queen's House	Nominated	
KBS Drama Awards	2025	Popularity award ㅡ Actress	Hahm Eun-jung	Nominated	
KBS Drama Awards	2025	Popularity award ㅡ Actor	Seo Jun-young	Nominated	
KBS Drama Awards	2025	Top Excellence Award ㅡ Actress	Hahm Eun-jung	Nominated	
KBS Drama Awards	2025	Excellence Award ㅡ Actress in a Daily Drama	Hahm Eun-jung	Won	
KBS Drama Awards	2025	Excellence Award ㅡ Actor in a Daily Drama	Park Yoon-jae	Won	
KBS Drama Awards	2025	Best Young Actor	Kwon Yul	Nominated	
KBS Drama Awards	2025	Best Young Actress	Choi Seol-ah	Nominated	
