= 100 People, 100 Songs =

- Promotional poster
- Also known as: Sing to the End; Going to the End; The Last Song
- Genre: Music, Entertainment
- Presented by: Kim Sung-joo; Jang Yoon-jeong; Moon Hee-joon
- Country of origin: South Korea
- Original language: Korean
- No. of episodes: 44

Production
- Executive producer: Kim Hyung-jung
- Producers: Lee Chang-woo; Kang Miso; Sin Young-gwang
- Production location: South Korea
- Running time: 60-109 minutes
- Production company: JTBC

Original release
- Network: JTBC
- Release: October 31, 2014 – September 27, 2015

100 People, 100 Songs (Korean: 백인백곡 끝까지 간다) is a 2014 South Korean singing competition program presented by Kim Sung-joo, Jang Yun-jeong and Moon Hee-joon. It aired on JTBC from October 31, 2014 to September 27, 2015.

== Format ==
There are a total of 100 people in the audience as there are a total of 100 songs that are each given a number. When a contestant chooses a number, she/he has to sing the song associated with that number. The song starts off with a selected member of the audience singing the beginning of the song before the contestant continues singing the song with the lyrics jumbled up on the screen. If the contestant manages to sing the song correctly and clears the screen, the screen shows "CLEAR" and they win that round. When competing as a duo, the person who gets the song incorrectly ("FAIL") will eliminate his/her partner from competing, then the remaining member must pass the one-chance revival test before continuing on.

== Notable contestants ==
- N (VIXX)
- Ken (VIXX)
- Wendy (Red Velvet)
- Seulgi (Red Velvet)
- Sandeul (B1A4)
- Solji (EXID)
- Hani (EXID)
- Minah (Girl's Day)
- K.Will
- Lee Tae-il (Block B)
- Huh Gak
- Kim Seul-gi
- Min Kyung-hoon (Buzz)
- Jang Yoon-jeong
- Soyou (Sistar)
- Changmin (2AM)
- Jinwoon (2AM)
- Kyuhyun (Super Junior)
- Kim Tae-woo
- Park Ji-min (15&)
- Min (Miss A)
- Kim Yeon-ji
- Son Seung-yeon
- Choa (AOA)
- Baek A-yeon
- Kim Feel
- DIA
- Wheein (Mamamoo)
- Hwasa (Mamamoo)
- Chunji (Teen Top)
- Lizzy (After School)
- Raina (After School)

== Broadcast History ==
| Broadcast Dates | Airtime |
|---|---|
| October 31, 2014 – December 5, 2014 | Friday 21:30 |
| December 14, 2014 – January 1, 2015 | Sunday 23:00 |
| January 20, 2015 20 – August 25, 2015 | Tuesday 21:40 |
| September 6, 2015 – September 27, 2015 | Sunday 20:30 |
