= Hahm Eun-jung =

South Korean singer and actress (born 1988)

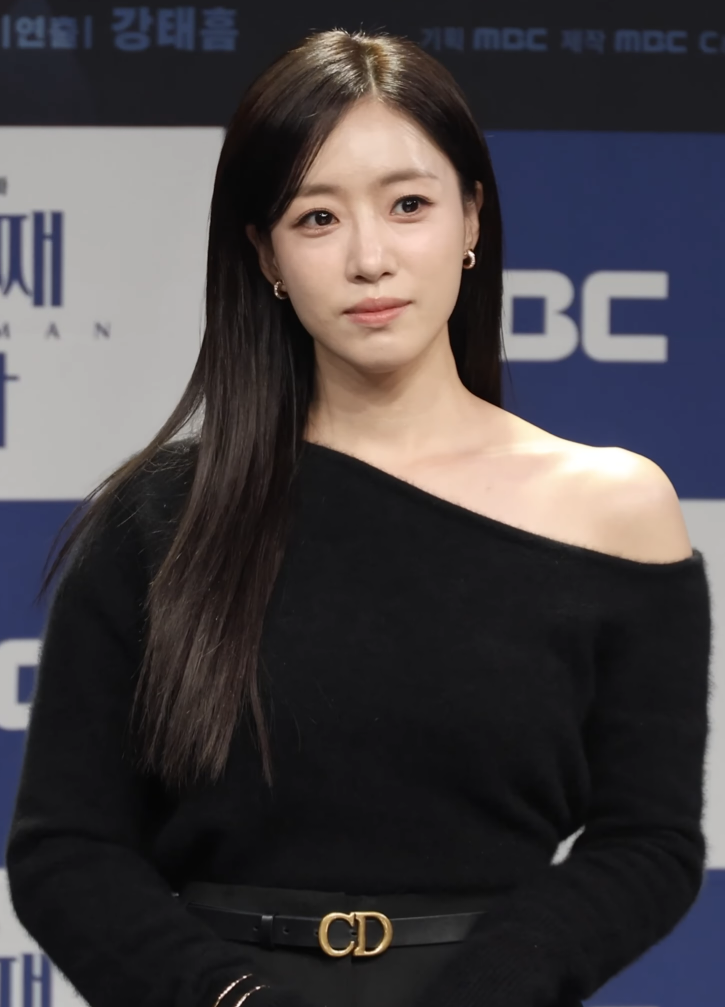
- Hahm in December 2025
- Born: December 12, 1988 (age 37); Seoul, South Korea
- Other names: Elsie; Elle
- Occupations: Singer; actress; model; host; entertainer; lyricist
- Years active: 1995–present
- Agent: Mask Studio
- Spouse: Kim Byung-woo (m. 2025)
- Musical career
- Genres: K-pop; R&B
- Instrument: Vocals
- Years active: 2009–present
- Labels: MBK; EMI Japan; Banana Culture; Likey Japan
- Member of: T-ara; T-ara N4

Korean name
- Hangul: 함은정
- RR: Ham Eunjeong
- MR: Ham Ŭnjŏng

Signature
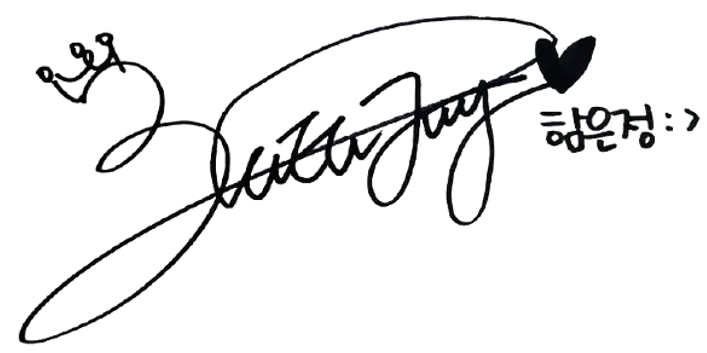

Hahm Eun-jung (Korean: 함은정; born December 12, 1988), known professionally as Eunjung and also Elsie, is a South Korean singer, actress, model, host, entertainer, and lyricist. She began her career at the age of seven as an entertainer in 1995, when she won the Little Miss Korea competition and debuted as a child actress in the same year in a television drama A New Generation of Adults (1995). Since then, she has taken on several roles in movies, television series and also being cast in various commercial films. After three years of training, she debuted as a member of South Korean girl group T-ara in July 2009 (and later its subgroup T-ara N4).

She has won the Child Actor Award for her role in "Drama of The Year" multi-winner Land at the 2004 SBS Drama Awards. She was also nominated and won awards for comedies Coffee House (2010) and Dream High (2011), reality show We Got Married (2011–12), family drama Be My Dream Family (2021), daily soap opera Love Twist (2021–22), romance drama Suji & Uri (2024), and the thriller Queen's House (2025). (Note: KBS Drama Award for Excellence, Actor in a Daily Drama)

She debuted as a solo artist by the name Elsie with her EP, I'm Good, on May 7, 2015, which went on to win her The Best Female Artist at V Chart Awards, China's largest video-sharing platform. Hahm's career extends beyond music and cinema—she has forayed into modeling, hosting, and TV. She has hosted over 15 events from the Dream Concert to the Grand Bell Awards and Jecheon International Music & Film Festival. In 2012, she hosted an episode of Saturday Night Live Korea along with S.E.S.'s Bada and Horan, which drew a rating of 1.444%.

== Early life and education ==
Hahm was born in Sanggye-dong, Nowon District, Seoul, South Korea. Her mother, a graduate of Ewha Womans University, was a former piano teacher who worked as Hahm's agent. While attending seventh grade, Hahm started Taekwondo lessons and won three different competitions. Her mother made the decision to quit teaching and manage her career upon her high school graduation in 2007. Later that year, Hahm enrolled in Dongguk University where she took performance courses.

She is an only child and has been quoted as explaining, "My mother had me 10 years after she was married to my father, which seems more hurtful. Upon watching several famous performers in the past, she wanted to become an actress. Now that I have, she is very pleased I have acting as a priority. She believes her original prayers were answered." Hahm's late mother was a piano instructor who later became her agent, while her father owns a small raw fish restaurant in Gangwon Province.

== Career ==
=== 1995–2008: Career beginnings ===
In 1995, when Hahm was seven years old, she participated in the "Little Miss Korea" pageant and won. That same year, she appeared in the youth drama A New Generation of Adults, which aired on KBS. Afterwards, she had several minor roles in movies and dramas, along with being cast in several commercial films.

In 2007, Hahm made appearances in a number of music videos. Namely, eighteen-year-old Hahm is featured in SG Wannabe's music video "Gasiri" from Story In New York. Later that year, she would also be seen in F.T. Island's music videos: "Thunder"; "Only One Person", and "A Man's First Love Follow Him To The Grave". She also appeared in the 2008 horror film Death Bell, where she plays a student who was murdered by her teacher. Eunjung self-taught herself Pansori, a traditional Korean singing style, by practicing with old tapes to qualify for her first major role in Land.

=== 2009–2012: Rising popularity ===
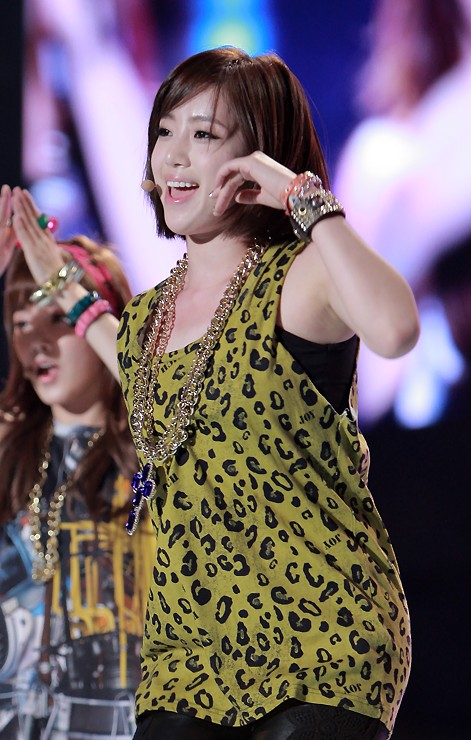
Hahm performing in 2012

Hahm originally trained to be an actress, and later debuted as a member of T-ara in July 2009. She was the first leader of the group, until September 2010. Hahm featured in Davichi's music video "Time, Please Stop" which was released on May 6, 2010. Her first major acting role since joining T-ara was in SBS drama Coffee House, which aired from May 17 to July 17, 2010. That same year, she was cast in the horror film White: Melody of Death.

Hahm's popularity began to rise in 2011 when she starred in the teen drama Dream High. The drama was a success and brought high domestic viewership ratings. It also gained popularity in other countries and won several international awards. From 2011 to 2012, she joined MBC's variety program We Got Married, pairing up with actor Lee Jang-woo. She won the Best Newcomer Award at the MBC Entertainment Awards. Hahm was then cast in historical dramas The King of Legend and Insu, The Queen Mother.

In June 2012, Hahm was confirmed to star in the drama Five Fingers. However, on August 22, it was revealed that she had been dropped from the drama. The Korean Actors Labor Union demanded that Hahm be issued an apology by the producer and crew. In February 2013, Yein E&M issued a formal apology for firing Hahm without notice. In October 2013, MBK Entertainment revealed that Eun-jung participated in the arrangement of T-ara's upcoming track "I Know The Feeling" from their newest EP Again. Deoksang Park, the composer of the song proposed the collaboration.

=== 2014–2017: Return to acting and solo debut ===
Hahm made her return to acting in 2014, with SBS' weekend period drama Endless Love. In 2015, it was announced that Hahm was offered the lead role in the Thai romantic comedy Micro Love, making her the first female idol to star in a Thai film. In May, Hahm made her solo debut under the stage name Elsie. She released her first mini album I'm Good, with the lead single of the same name featuring K.Will. The Chinese version of her music video peaked at number two on YinYueTai's music video charts. On October 14, Hahm released the song Goodbye, as the soundtrack of T-ara's web-drama Sweet Temptation. The song was also included in her repackaged mini album, Goodbye, released on October 30. In 2016, Hahm was cast in Flowers of Evil, a thriller directed by Cho Sung-kyu. In 2017, Hahm was cast in MBC's daily drama, Sisters-in-Law, which premiered in April that year.

=== 2018–present: New agency and solo career ===
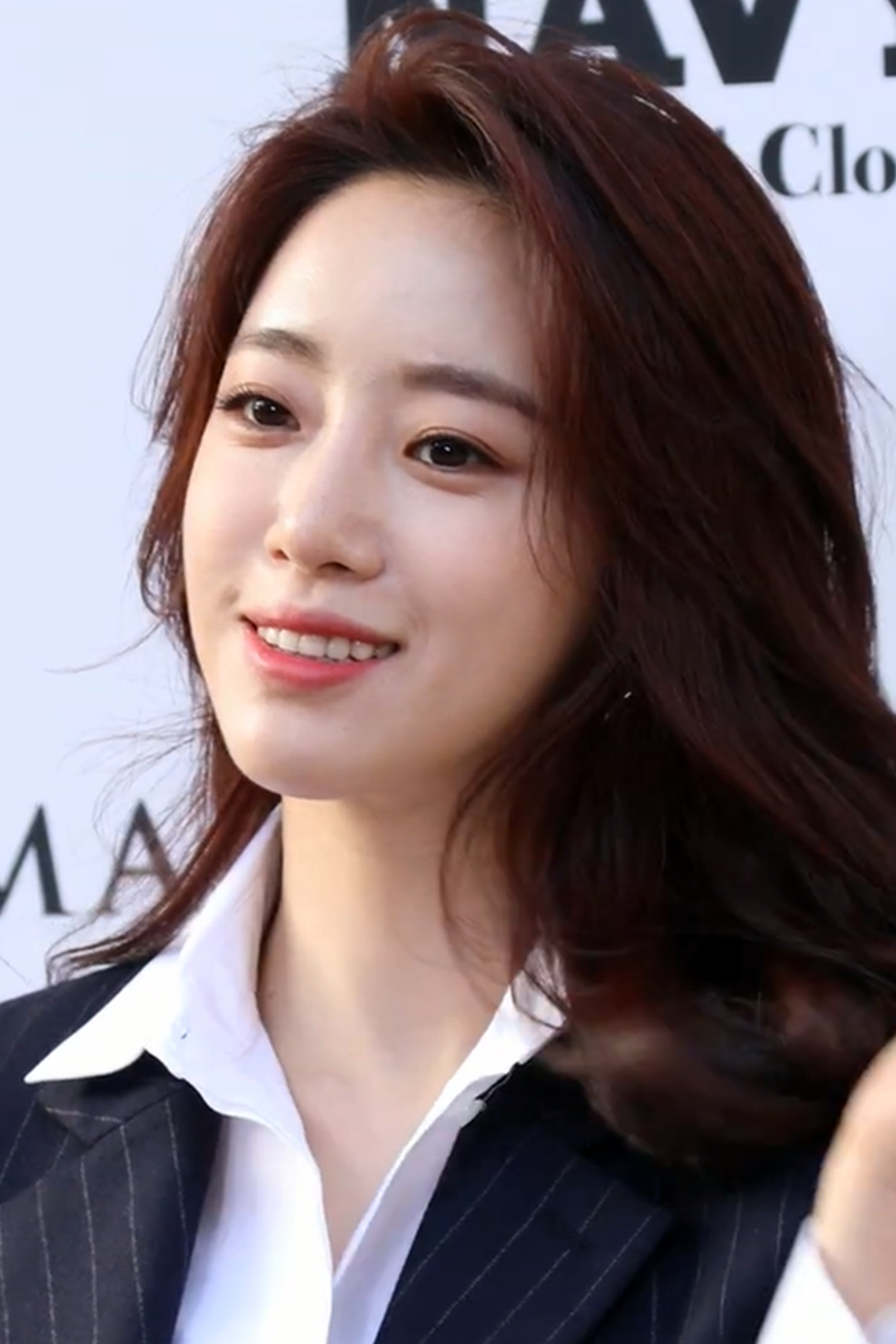
Hahm in 2019

In January 2018, Hahm confirmed her departure from MBK after her contract expired. In February, Hahm signed an exclusive management contract with UFO Production, making her the company's first-ever artist. UFO Production, a subsidiary of technology company Pobis TNC, is more known for producing the MBC TV weekend drama Money Flower. On May 24, it was confirmed that Hahm was cast in KBS's romantic comedy-drama Lovely Horribly, starring Park Si-hoo and Song Ji-hyo. On February 26, 2019, it was announced that Hahm would be the narrator for the Korea-Vietnam co-production documentary named The Muse Story, which will be broadcast on KBS World. On October 14, 2020, her label announced that Hahm would be starring in an upcoming film called "I Will, Song" as Moon-kyul, a singer who can no longer sing.

Hahm was cast in the leading role of the TV drama Be My Dream Family, which aired on KBS1 every weekday from March 29, 2021, to October 1. The drama was well-received for its heartwarming portrayal of family dynamics. On July 15, Hahm left Cabin 74 after her contract expired. On September 27, Hahm signed a new exclusive contract with Management Koo. In 2021, along with Supernova's Gonil, Eun-jung took the lead role in short original drama Cell Division which was released on DramaX. The drama was also sold in Japan to multiple broadcasters—this includes streaming services like Amazon's Prime Video, Yahoo Japan's GYAO, music.Jp and Fuji TV's FOD. It premiered on KNTV Japan on May 26.

On February 15, 2023, Hahm was confirmed to be part of the main cast of JTBC's variety program Differential Class for its new season which premieres on March 5. Differential Class is an informative variety show that first aired in 2017, achieving a peak rating of 5%. The show has also garnered over 500,000 followers and more than 200 million views on YouTube. Later in the year, Eun-jung was cast in Kunio Shimizu's "Dressing Room" portraying the character "D". The play was well-received and its run was extended until May 28, 2023, for encore performances. According to FN News, the play received an Interpark rating of 9.8 and a high rate of repeat attendance, earning the nickname "acting power show" for its cast of professional actors.

On February 19, 2024, Hahm signed an exclusive contract with Mask Studio. In September 2024, Eun-jung was appointed as a judge for the 4th Geumcheon Fashion Film Festival which will be held in Geumcheon District from September 6 to September 9.

In 2025, Hahm starred as the female lead in two revenge dramas, Queen's House, which aired from April to September, and The First Man, which premiered in December. For her portrayal as Kang Jae-in in Queen's House, Hahm won the Excellence Award for Actress in a Daily Drama at the 2025 KBS Drama Awards for the second year in a row. In January 2026, Hahm joined the Korean dub cast of Ne Zha 2, which has become the fifth-highest-grossing film of all time.

== Artistry ==
Hahm cited Jeon Do-yeon, Ha Ji-won, and Lee Mi-sook as her role-models in acting. She said their authenticity and versatility inspired her to pursue acting. She considers acting and singing very similar, often combining them while using different methods of expression, adding that actors feel refreshed and creative on stage. Commentators have also noted her confidence when performing alongside veteran actors despite beginning her career as an idol singer.

Hahm has spoken about approaching roles with a focus on clear character motivation, stating that she prefers portraying characters whose actions feel logical and grounded rather than arbitrary. She emphasizes preparation and discipline on set, often arriving early seeking deeper emotional engagement with characters. She noted that she focuses on staying faithful to the character and working closely with directors and co-actors rather than being discouraged by criticism. Eun-jung has also expressed interest in exploring a wide range of roles, aiming to push herself beyond comfort, and reflects on her own artistic tastes and style to bring authenticity to each role.

== Public image and impact ==
=== Acting ===
Hahm, who debuted as a child actress and model, has significantly diversified her career over the years. She has frequently been recognized as one of the best idol-actors throughout her three-decade acting career. In 2011, NewsWire wrote that she "has proven herself to be the best acting idol of her time", while Cine21 hailed her the next-generation "horror queen" due to her standout roles in horror movies White: Melody of Death and Death Bell, —a genre rarely explored by idols. That same year, a Sports Seoul survey ranked her as the third-best acting idol, as voted by over 80 idols, making her the only female idol in the Top 5. Her reputation as a skilled actress was further cemented in 2012 when she again secured third place in a critics' survey conducted by Nate. Alongside her T-ara groupmates Park Ji-yeon and Hyomin, they are collectively referred to as "T-ara's Three acting idols". In September 2024, Eun-jung was appointed as a judge for the 4th Geumcheon Fashion Film Festival, held in Geumcheon District from September 6 to September 9. In 2011, South Korean producer Kim Kwang-soo stated that Hahm and Park were the most outstanding idol actors. He praised Hahm's continuous growth and versatility as an actress, particularly highlighting her performance in Coffee House. A role that helped secure her the lead role in Dream High, her biggest project at the time, and led to several additional offers, which she ultimately declined due to her demanding schedule. Her performances have also received praise from senior actors, including Chae Shi-ra, who commended Hahm's natural acting and said her expressive delivery and tone suited the bold character she portrayed in Queen Insoo.

Hahm has starred in numerous acclaimed projects, including Land (2004), Coffee House (2010), Dream High (2011), Queen Insu (2011), and more recently Love Twist (2021–2022), and Suji & Uri (2024), which have achieved strong ratings and received widespread praise both commercially and critically. Hahm's performances have earned her several prestigious nominations, including multiple nods for Excellence Awards at the MBC Drama Awards and KBS Drama Awards, as well as a nomination for the Top Excellence Award at the APAN Star Awards, both one of the highest honors in South Korea's acting industry. In 2024, her role in Suji & Uri earned her the Excellence Award at the KBS Drama Awards.

=== Cultural impact ===
Hahm rose to prominence not only through her acting but also through her widespread popularity on Cyworld pages, an early social media platform, where she frequently topped the most-visited and popular pages with hundreds of thousands of weekly views. Hahm's successful musical and acting career secured her numerous brand endorsements across South Korea.

In addition to her commercial success, Hahm served as an ambassador for various organizations in South Korea and abroad. At 17, she was appointed by the Ministry Of Agriculture, Food and Rural Affairs as a public relations ambassador. Her international representation includes attending the "Korea-Brunei 30th year Relations Ceremony", where she met with government officials and dined formally with the country's Prime Minister.

In 2022, Hahm was awarded the Korea-China Culture Exchange Award Grand Prize at the 2022 World Creators Awards for her channel on Bilibili, one of the major Chinese streaming platforms, which garnered nearly 200,000 subscribers and 10 million views.

=== Fashion ===
In 2010, T-ara was selected as the first exclusive models for Look Optical. The following year, Hahm starred in individual commercials and promotional campaigns, sparking a surge in demand for the eyewear she wore, later dubbed "Eunjung's Glasses", with 10,000 units sold. The flagship Look Optical store achieved an average monthly revenue exceeding 300 million won, while the other 44 outlets averaged 70 million won per month. This remarkable success became a case study for business scholars, highlighting how leveraging idols’ images could redefine public perceptions of eyeglasses and drive market expansion.

== Other ventures ==
=== Endorsements and promotions ===
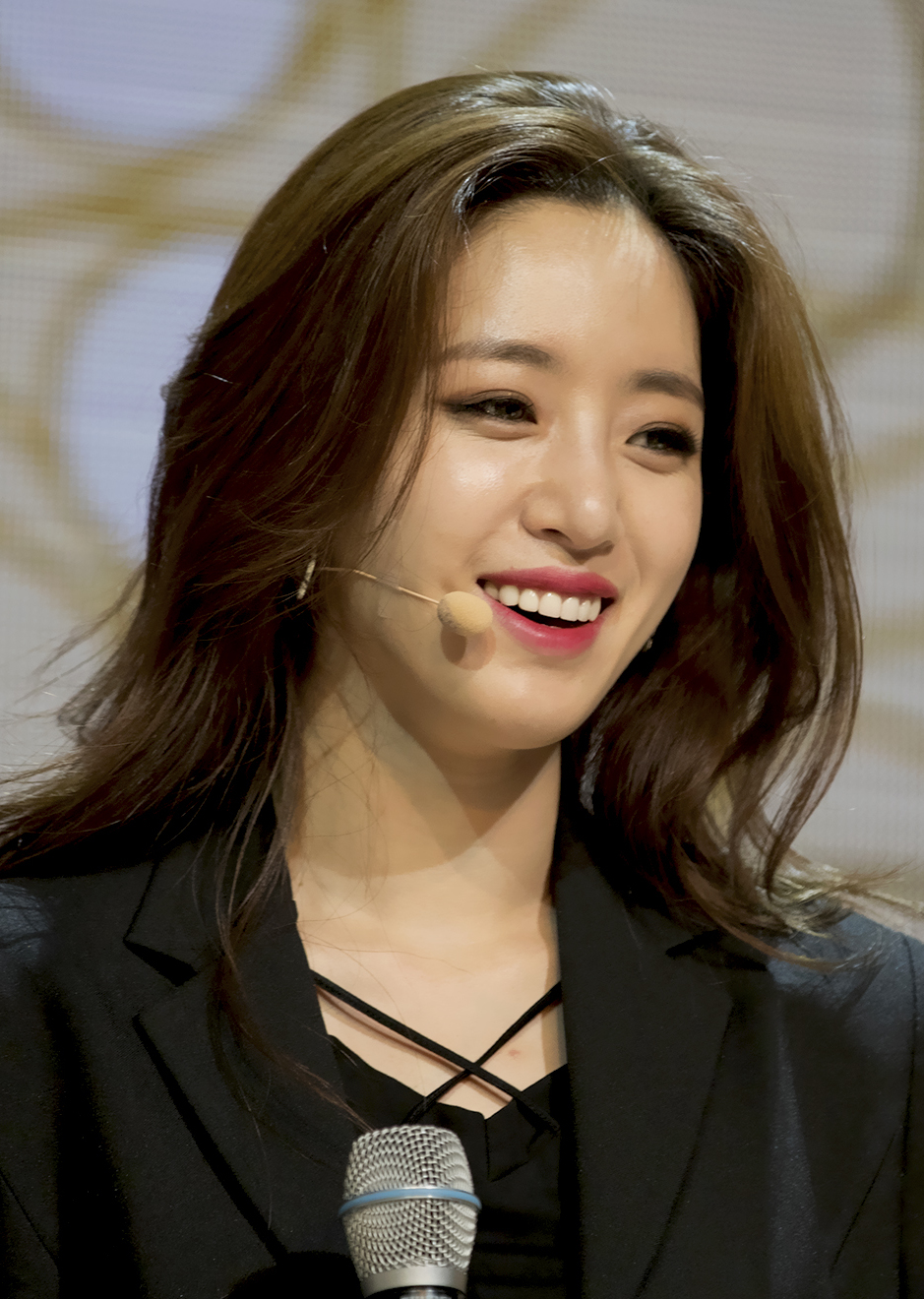
Hahm in 2017

Hahm has modeled for several brands since before her debut as a singer. Her first advertisement was a print ad for Korea's leading mineral water, Jeju Samdasoo, in 1998. In February 2011, she was selected as an exclusive model for the clothing brand SPRIS, alongside actor Kim Soo-hyun. Known as one of the most popular fashion brands among young people, SPRIS previously featured notable figures such as Lee Joon-gi, Kim Beom, and 2PM. The campaign included multiple TV commercials and a 3-minute music-drama video featuring a newly recorded song by Hahm and Kim, titled "Crazy4s". However, the track was never officially released. In 2012, Hahm became KDB Daewoo Securities' first female idol public representative. As part of the collaboration, she appeared in the company's promotional materials and opened her first account there to manage her finances and assets.

In 2015, Hahm became the face of Burger King Korea, following fellow group members Hyomin and Park Ji-yeon, who had endorsed the brand the previous year. Her promotional posters were displayed nationwide. The following year, she was chosen as a model for Coca-Cola alongside Kim Yu-bin and Yoon Park. She actively participated in various promotional events for the brand for two years, including its 130th-anniversary exhibition. In 2023, Hahm modeled for Korean skin care brand Lumiderm and was officially chosen as the brand's spokesperson in January 2025.

In 2012, The Voice of the People Newspaper, reported that each of T-ara's member's individual advertising fee is around 400 million won, one of the highest in the industry.

=== Ambassadorships ===
Hahm has been appointed as an ambassador for numerous institutions and events across various countries since her debut in 1995. In 2005, she was named an ambassador for South Korea's Ministry of Agriculture, Food and Rural Affairs. In 2011, she was appointed as the Public Relations and Goodwill Ambassador for the National Police Agency, receiving an ambassador award from police Commissioner Cho Hyun-oh at the National Warfare Guard Festival on March 8. That same year, she became an ambassador for ETN's audition show Global Super Idol in Thailand, where she also served as a mentor and judge.

Her ambassadorships extend to the luxury sector as well. She was named an ambassador for Gold Elite Paris in Thailand, in 2016. That same year, she was appointed as a Public Relations ambassador for Dongguk University, receiving her appointment certification from the university's president on October 17.

In 2017, as the Public Relations ambassador for the 9th Gangneung Coffee Festival, she attended the opening ceremony and received the Talent Ambassador plaque from the mayor of Gangneung. She has also supported cultural and philanthropic initiatives, serving as an honorary ambassador and participant in Hattung's Aesop Fable Donation in 2020 and acting as an ambassador for the Chunsa Film & Arts Awards Festival the same year. In 2026, Hahm was appointed as the ambassador for the 11th Ulsan Ulju World Mountain Film Festival, South Korea's premier international mountain and nature film festival. She was given the title "UMFFinist", the official title given to the promotional ambassador. Eun-jung's acting range and ability to communicate with the public were listed as the reason for the choice.

Internationally, Hahm represented South Korea in Brunei at the Korea-Brunei 30th Year Relations Ceremony in 2014, participating in the signing ceremony of a 500 billion won joint project between the two nations.

=== Smile (book) ===
In 2016, Hahm published her first pocket-book, Smile, inspired by her experiences while filming the reality show What Should I Do? in Thailand. In the book, she shares her thoughts and emotions from her time traveling and working in the country. The title reflects her impression of the Thai people's constant warmth and smiles.

The book was a limited release and published in three languages—English, Korean, and Thai. Beyond writing, Hahm was also involved in the creative process, designing the cover and accompanying merchandise.

== Philanthropy and activism ==
Hahm is an advocate for pet protection. In July 2016, Hahm participated in the 'Protect Us' campaign. Hosted by premium pet magazine Life & Dogue and Thank You Studio, It aimed to revise the animal protection act in South Korea and prevent animal abuse. A year later, she participated in G9's abandoned animal campaign. The singer donated several fashion items through TV Report. All donations collected were donated to the animal protection civic group 'KARA' and used for abandoned animal rescue.

In 2016, Hahm traveled to Thailand to volunteer to distribute food at Sanam Luang. In 2018, to celebrate her 30th birthday, Hahm held a charity event in Vietnam during which she met up with her fans, visited a nursing home and provided meals to 300 homeless people. She also gave gifts to 150 of her fans including bottles, photos, key chains and slogans that she made herself. She explained that her Vietnamese fans celebrated her last birthday which warmed her heart and inspired her to organize the event.

In August 2024, Hahm participated in "Daehan is Alive" campaign to celebrate the National Liberation Day of Korea. As a holder of a level 2 certificate in Korean history, she released a multi-lingual video introducing independence activist and poet Lee Yuk-sa in collaboration with Professor Seo Kyung-deok on August 14.

== Personal life ==
In 2010, Hahm revealed that she holds a 3rd-degree black belt in Taekwondo. She frequently showcased her martial arts skills on live television programs such as Haha Mong Show, Three Wheels, and Let's Go Dream Team in Vietnam. Her expertise in Taekwondo also proved beneficial in her acting career, particularly in historical dramas that required action sequences. In addition to Taekwondo, Eunjung trained in ballet and rhythmic gymnastics as a child.

On October 16, 2025, it was confirmed that Hahm would marry film director Kim Byung-woo in November. The couple married on November 30.

== Discography ==
=== Korean extended plays ===
Title	Album details	Peak chart positions	Sales
Title	Album details	KOR	Sales
I'm Good	Released: May 7, 2015 (KOR); Re-released: October 30, 2015 (Goodbye); Label: MBK, LOEN; Format: CD, digital download	6	KOR: 9,000
I'm Good	Released: May 7, 2015 (KOR); Re-released: October 30, 2015 (Goodbye); Label: MBK, LOEN; Format: CD, digital download	8	KOR: 9,000
"/" denotes a that recording was not released in that territory.

=== Japanese extended plays ===
Title	Album details	Peak chart positions	
Title	Album details	JPN	
Title	Album details	Oricon	Billboard
Desire	Released: June 12, 2019 (JPN); Label: Akatsuki; Format: CD, digital download	176	82
"/" denotes a that recording was not released in that territory.

=== Singles ===
Title	Year	Peak chart positions		Sales	Album
Title	Year	KOR	KOR Hot	Sales	Album
As lead artist
"Wonder Woman" (with Hyomin, Seeya and Davichi)	2010	6	—	KOR: 2,300,000	Non-album single
"I'm Good" (feat. K.Will)	2015	66	—	KOR: 56,972	I'm Good
"Goodbye"	2015	— (Note: "Goodbye" did not chart on Gaon's Digital chart, but peaked at number 40 on the BGM chart.)	—	KOR: 4,511	Goodbye
As featured artist
"Blue Moon" (SeeYa, Davichi and Black Pearl feat. Hyomin & Eunjung)	2008	—	—		Non-album singles
"N-Time" (Hwang Jung-eum feat. Hyomin & Eunjung)	2009	—	—		Non-album singles
"I Love You! Always Happy! " (BGH To feat. Eunjung)	2011	69	58	KOR: 172,335	Non-album singles
"Cotton Candy" (BGH To feat. Eunjung)	2011	69	42	KOR: 291,580	Non-album singles
"Cotton Candy" (Note: Special remake) (Sunny Hill feat. Eunjung)	2024	—	—		Non-album singles
Promotional singles
"Don't Forget Me" (Note: With Soyeon; Minkyung of The SeeYa; Jongkook, Sejun, and KI-O of Speed; and Cho Seung-hee)	2015	— (Note: "Don't Forget Me" didn't chart on Gaon's Digital chart, but peaked at number 54 and 70 on the Bell and BGM chart respectively.)	—	KOR: 15,441	Non-album singles
"*" denotes charts which did not exist at the time of release.

=== Japanese singles ===
Title	Year	Peak chart positions	Album
Title	Year	JP Hot	Album
"Desire"	2019	—	Desire
Promotional singles
"Sweet Snow"	2019	—	Non-album single
"White Destiny"	2022	—	Non-album single
"Arigato"	2025	—	Non-album single
"*" denotes charts which did not exist at the time of release.

=== Soundtrack appearances ===
Title	Year	Peak chart positions			Album
Title	Year	Bell	Ring	BGM	Album
"Coffee House" (Note: The song was never released as a stand-alone single like most OSTs)	2010	—	—	—	Coffee House OST (Director's Cut)
"White"	2011	43	53	28	White: The Melody Of The Curse OST
"Dragon Heart War" (Note: Recorded for Chinese anime "Seisen Cerberus".)	2016	—	—	—	Seisen Cerberus OST (iQIYI)
"Shout To The Sky"	2018	19	76	75	My Secret Terrius OST Part.4
"You Are My Star"	2019	—	—	13	I Hate You! Juliet OST Part.3
"Coincidence" with (Basick)	2021	—	—	—	Recipe For Youth OST Part.1
"Throbbing Sometimes Beating"	2023	—	—	—	Apple of My Eye OST Part 1
"*" denotes charts which did not exist at the time of release.

=== Compilation appearances and covers ===
Song	Year	Album	Notes
"Not Everyone Can Love" (Live) (with Hyomin)	2013	Immortal Song: Singing a Legend	Original song by Tae Jin Ah
"Faraway Home" (Live) (with Hyomin)	2014	Immortal Song: Singing a Legend (Lunar New Year Special)	Original song by Na Hoon-a
"Still Have You" (Live) (with Hyomin)	2014	Music Trip Yesterday Episode 1 (College Song Festival)	Original song by YB
"I Believe"	2023	Music In the Trip	Original by Shin Seung-hun
"City Drive"	2023	Music In the Trip	

=== Other appearances ===
Song	Year	Artist	Album
"Dangerous" (with Hyomin & Jiyeon)	2013	T-ara	"Bunny Style!"
"Two As One"	2013	T-ara	"Bunny Style!"
"Real Love"	2017	T-ara	What's My Name?

=== Songwriting credits ===
In October 2013, MBK Entertainment revealed that Eun-jung participated in the arrangement of T-ara's upcoming track "I Know The Feeling" from their newest EP Again. Deoksang Park, the composer of the song proposed the collaboration. However, Eun-jung hasn't been credited for the song yet.

Year	Artist	Song	Album	Lyricist		Notes
Year	Artist	Song	Album	Credited	With	Notes
2023	Eun-jung	"City Drive"	Music in the Trip OST Part.4	Yes	—N/a	Song recorded for reality show Music in the Trip

== Theatre ==
Year	Title	Role	Date	Venue	City	Country	Ref.
2020	Les Misérables	Cosette	August 7, 2020 ㅡ August 16, 2020	Daegu Kei-myung Art Center	Daegu	South Korea	
2023	Dressing Room	D	March 4, 2023 ㅡ May 28, 2023	Interpark Seo Kyung Square	Seoul	South Korea	
2025	Dressing Room	D	June 24, 2025 ㅡ June 29, 2025	Hakuhinkan Theater	Tokyo	Japan	

== Narration ==
Year	Title	Country	Ref.
2013	UN World Peace Festival	South Korea	
2019	The Muse Story	Vietnam	

== Accolades ==
=== Awards and nominations ===
Name of the award ceremony, year presented, category, nominee of the award, and the result of the nomination
Award ceremony	Year	Category	Nominee / Work	Result	Ref.
APAN Star Awards	2024	Top Excellence Award ㅡ Actress in Serial Drama	Suji & Uri	Nominated	
APAN Star Awards	2025	Top Excellence Award ㅡ Actress in Serial Drama	Queen's House	Nominated	
Asia Star Entertainer Awards	2025	Best Leading Actress	Suji & Uri	Nominated	
Asia Star Entertainer Awards	2026	Best Leading Actress	Queen's House	Nominated	
Baeksang Arts Awards	2011	Most Popular Actress ㅡ TV	Dream High	Nominated	
China Film Art Festival Awards	2017	Popularity Award ㅡ Commercial Films	Hahm Eun-jung	Won	
DramaBeans Awards	2010	Favourite Alternate Couple (With Kang Ji-hwan)	Coffee House	Nominated	
DramaBeans Awards	2010	Best Use of an Idol Star	Coffee House	Nominated	
DramaBeans Awards	2011	Best Use of an Idol Star	Dream High	Nominated	
DramaBeans Awards	2011	Best Posse (With Suzy)	Dream High	Nominated	
Gangneung Coffee Festival	2017	Talent Ambassador	Hahm Eun-jung	Won	
Gaon Chart Music Awards	2010	Best Selling Ringtone	"Wonder Woman"	Won	
Gaon Chart Music Awards	2015	Weibo Star Award	Hahm Eun-jung	Nominated	
INNOLIFE Japan Awards	2011	Next Generation Female Star	Dream High	Won	
Instyle Korea Awards	2014	Star Beauty Award	Hahm Eun-jung	Won	
Instyle Korea Awards	2016	Star Beauty Award	Hahm Eun-jung	Won	
KBS Drama Awards	2021	Best Supporting Actress	Be My Dream Family	Won	
KBS Drama Awards	2022	Popularity Award	Love Twist	Nominated	
KBS Drama Awards	2022	Excellence Award ㅡ Actress in a Daily Drama	Love Twist	Nominated	
KBS Drama Awards	2024	Popularity award ㅡ Actress	Suji & Uri	Nominated	
KBS Drama Awards	2024	Excellence Award ㅡ Actress in a Daily Drama	Suji & Uri	Won	
KBS Drama Awards	2024	Best Couple (with Baek Sung-hyun)	Suji & Uri	Won	
KBS Drama Awards	2025	Popularity award ㅡ Actress	Queen's House	Nominated	
KBS Drama Awards	2025	Excellence Award ㅡ Actress in a Daily Drama	Queen's House	Won	
KBS Drama Awards	2025	Top Excellence Award ㅡ Actress	Queen's House	Nominated	
Korea National Police Agency	2011	Goodwill ambassador Award	Hahm Eun-jung	Won	
National Mugunghwa Children’s Excellence Pageant	1995	Little Miss Korea	Hahm Eun-jung	Won	
MBC Drama Awards	2017	Excellence Award ㅡ Actress in Soap Opera	Sisters-in-Law	Nominated	
MBC Drama Awards	2017	Best New Actress	Sisters-in-Law	Nominated	
MBC Entertainment Awards	2011	Best Newcomer ㅡ Variety	We Got Married	Won	
MBC Entertainment Awards	2011	Best Couple (with Lee Jang-woo)	We Got Married	Nominated	
SBS Drama Awards	2004	Child Actor Award	Toji, the Land	Won	
SBS Drama Awards	2010	New Star Award	Coffee House	Won	
V Chart Awards	2016	Best Female Artist	I'm Good	Won	
V Chart Awards	2016	Artist of the Year	I'm Good	Nominated	
World Creators Awards	2022	Korea-China Culture Exchange Award – Grand Prize	Hahm Eun-jung channel – Bilibili	Won	
Yahoo Asia Buzz Awards	2010	Asia's Buzz Artist – Female	Hahm Eun-jung	Nominated	

=== Listicles ===
Publisher	Year	List	Rank	Ref.
Sports Seoul	2011	Best Acting-Idols Picked By Stars	3rd	
The Kukmin Daily	2012	Best Acting-Idols According To Critics	3rd	
TV Report	2013	Best Acting-Idols Selected By Drama Producers	4th	
Forbes China	2017	Global Idol Chinese Popularity Ranking	44th	
