= My Sweet Mobster =

2024 South Korean television series

- Promotional poster
- Hangul: 놀아주는 여자
- Hanja: 놀아주는 女子
- Lit.: The Woman Who Plays
- RR: Norajuneun yeoja
- MR: Norajunŭn yŏja
- Genre: Romantic comedy
- Based on: The Woman Who Plays by Bangulmama (Park Soo-jung)
- Written by: Na-kyung
- Directed by: Kim Young-hwan; Kim Woo-hyun
- Starring: Um Tae-goo; Han Sun-hwa; Kwon Yul
- Music by: Moon Seung-nam
- Country of origin: South Korea
- Original language: Korean
- No. of episodes: 16

Production
- Running time: 60 minutes
- Production companies: Base Story; SLL; IOK Company

Original release
- Network: JTBC
- Release: June 12 – August 1, 2024

My Sweet Mobster (Korean: 놀아주는 여자) is a 2024 South Korean television series based on a Naver web novel of the same title by Bangulmama. Starring Um Tae-goo, Han Sun-hwa, and Kwon Yul, it aired on JTBC from June 12, to August 1, 2024, every Wednesday and Thursday at 20:50 (KST). The show is available on Viki and Viu in selected regions.

== Synopsis ==
My Sweet Mobster tells the story of a romance drama full of twists and turns between Seo Ji-hwan, who has come to terms with his dark past, and Go Eun-ha, who plays a woman that creates web videos inspiring children.

== Cast and characters ==
=== Main ===
- Um Tae-goo as Seo Ji-hwan / Yoon Hyeon-woo
  - Jung Yoo-geun as teenage Yoon Hyeon-woo
  - Lee Joo-won as child Yoon Hyeon-woo

A former gangster and current CEO of Thirsty Deer, a food company that hires ex-convicts to offer a fresh start.

- Han Sun-hwa as Go Eun-ha
  - Kwon Dan-ah as child Go Eun-ha

A web channel content creator who uses the pseudonym "Mini Unnie", also known as "Sister Mini", and creates kid-friendly content that is somewhat inspired by her childhood friend, Hyeon-woo, without including product placements, much to the chagrin of her CEO.

- Kwon Yul as Jang Hyeon-woo

A prosecutor who maintains a terrible relationship with Ji-hwan.

=== Supporting ===
==== Thirsty Deers ====
- Kim Hyun-jin as Joo Il-young, General Manager.
- Yang Hyun-min as Kwak Jae-soo, Customer Management Team leader.
- Lee Yoo-joon as Jung Man-ho, Product Development Team Leader.
- Moon Dong-hyeok as Yang Hong-ki, Marketing Team Leader.
- Park Jae-chan as Seo Dong-hee, Management Support and Executive Assistant.

==== Mi-ho and family ====
- Moon Ji-in as Gumiho
- Lee Byung-joon as Mi-ho's father,
- Yoon Jin-sung as Mi-ho's mother

==== Macaron soft ====
- Song Seo-rin as Kang Ye-na
- Yeon Je-ok as CEO Ma
- Jo Hyun-sik as PD Lee

==== Kitty company ====
- Im Chul-soo as Go Yang-hee
- Kim Hyun-joon as Lee Gang-gil
- Kim Roi-ha as Seo Tae-pyeong

==== Seoul Central District Prosecutors' Office ====
- Park Chul-min as Section Chief Oh
- Shin Su-hyun as Officer Song

=== Other ===
- Kim Tae-woo

=== Special appearances ===
- Kim Young-ok as the owner of Hyeon-woo's dumpling restaurant.
- Seo Nam-yong as Yoon Hyeon-woo, a civil service exam student who has been preparing for the civil service exam for 10 years.
- Sung Dong-il as Ho Taek
- Wang Ji-won as Ji-won

== Production ==
=== Casting ===
In October 2022, Um Tae-goo and Han Sun-hwa were reported to star as the leads of the series, marking their reunion after previously appearing together in the 2019 OCN drama Save Me 2. The series marked their second portrayal of love interests and their first time co-leading a series together.

=== Broadcast ===
My Sweet Mobster was included in JTBC's 2023 drama lineup announced in November 2022. However, its broadcast was postponed and it premiered on June 12, 2024, and aired for 16 episodes until August 1, 2024.

The series continued its scheduled Wednesday–Thursday broadcast on JTBC during the 2024 Summer Olympics period, while terrestrial broadcasters suspended several programs, including dramas, for Olympic coverage.

== Reception ==
=== Viewership ===
My Sweet Mobster : South Korea viewers per episode (thousands)

Season	Episode number																Average
Season	1	2	3	4	5	6	7	8	9	10	11	12	13	14	15	16	Average
1	502	474	449	N/A	520	534	476	579	523	635	614	557	505	480	575	680	N/A

Source: Audience measurement performed nationwide by Nielsen Korea.

Average TV viewership ratings
Ep.	Original broadcast date	Average audience share (Nielsen Korea)	
Ep.	Original broadcast date	Nationwide	Seoul
1	June 12, 2024	2.297% (9th)	2.208% (3rd)
2	June 13, 2024	2.185% (10th)	1.875% (10th)
3	June 19, 2024	1.852% (13th)	N/A
4	June 20, 2024	2.284% (9th)	2.040% (9th)
5	June 26, 2024	2.351% (7th)	2.176% (7th)
6	June 27, 2024	2.626% (5th)	2.503% (5th)
7	July 3, 2024	2.488% (5th)	2.442% (2nd)
8	July 4, 2024	2.759% (4th)	2.801% (3rd)
9	July 10, 2024	2.625% (3rd)	2.542% (4th)
10	July 11, 2024	3.003% (5th)	2.699% (4th)
11	July 17, 2024	2.863% (5th)	2.916% (2nd)
12	July 18, 2024	2.710% (7th)	2.552% (6th)
13	July 24, 2024	2.640% (8th)	2.730% (3rd)
14	July 25, 2024	2.322% (11th)	N/A
15	July 31, 2024	2.813% (4th)	2.416% (5th)
16	August 1, 2024	2.939% (4th)	2.366% (7th)
Average		2.547%	— (Note: Due to multiple unpublished ratings, the exact average rating is unknown.)
In the table above, the blue numbers represent the lowest ratings and the red numbers represent the highest ratings.; N/A denotes that the ratings were not published.; This drama aired on a cable channel/pay TV which normally has a relatively smaller audience compared to free-to-air TV/public broadcasters (KBS, SBS, MBC and EBS).

=== Domestic topicality ===
The pairing of Um Tae-goo and Han Sun-hwa, noted for their on-screen chemistry, was nicknamed the “Penguin Couple” by viewers following their penguin-huddling scene in the series.

Throughout its broadcast, My Sweet Mobster maintained high topicality rankings, culminating in a No. 5 ranking in Good Data Corporation's Top 20 television drama buzzworthiness rankings for the first half of 2024, published in mid-August 2024, as the only JTBC drama among the top five.

=== International reception ===
During its sixth week of release, My Sweet Mobster ranked No. 1 by viewership on Rakuten Viki in more than 110 countries. It remained No. 1 in 59 countries, including the United States, Brazil, and the United Kingdom, for six consecutive weeks.

== Home media ==
My Sweet Mobster was released on Blu-ray on March 26, 2025, in a five-disc edition containing couple and group commentaries featuring Um Tae-goo and Han Sun-hwa, interviews, and other bonus content.

== Accolades ==
Name of the award ceremony, year presented, category, nominee of the award, and the result of the nomination
Award ceremony	Year	Category	Nominee	Result	Ref.
APAN Star Awards	2024	Best Child Actor	Lee Joo-won	Won	
Asia Artist Awards	2024	Popularity Award – Actor	Um Tae-goo	Nominated	
Asia Artist Awards	2024	Popularity Award – Actress	Han Sun-hwa	Nominated	
Asia Model Awards	2024	Asia Star Award (Actor)	Um Tae-goo	Won	
Asia Model Awards	2024	Rising Star Award (Actor)	Kim Hyun-jin	Won	
Fundex Awards	2024	Best Actor – TV Drama	Um Tae-goo	Nominated	
Seoul Global Movie Awards	2024	Special Jury Award	Um Tae-goo	Won	
