= Um Tae-goo =

South Korean actor

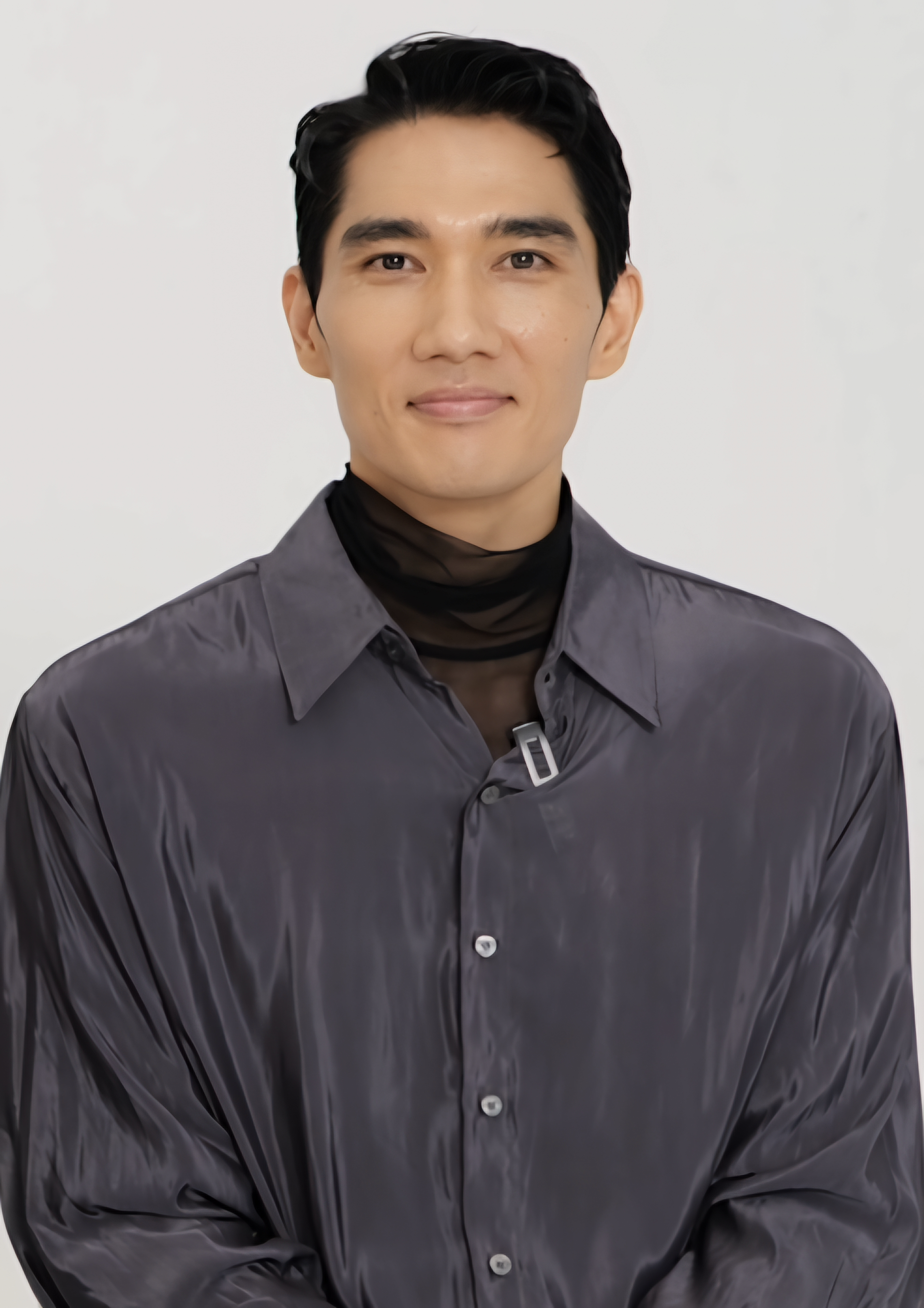
- Um in September 2021
- Born: November 9, 1983 (age 42); Seoul, South Korea
- Education: Konkuk University (Department of Film Arts)
- Occupation: Actor
- Years active: 2007–present
- Agent: TEAMHOPE
- Relatives: Um Tae-hwa (brother)

Korean name
- Hangul: 엄태구
- Hanja: 嚴泰九
- RR: Eom Taegu
- MR: Ŏm T'aegu

Um Tae-goo (Korean: 엄태구; born November 9, 1983) is a South Korean actor known for his supporting roles in critically acclaimed films such as Coin Locker Girl (2015) and The Age of Shadows (2016). He rose to prominence for his roles in the film Night in Paradise (2020) and the romantic comedy drama My Sweet Mobster (2024).

Um has frequently collaborated with his older brother, film director Um Tae-hwa. He made appearances as an actor on several of his brother's films, including Heart Vibrator, The Forest, Sookja, Ingtoogi: The Battle Internet Trolls, Vanishing Time: A Boy Who Returned, and Concrete Utopia.

== Early life and education ==
Um Tae-goo was born on November 9, 1983. He attended Jinju Air Force Aviation Science High School but left during his second year after realizing he could not fulfill the seven years of mandatory military service required post-graduation. He started acting at the recommendation of a friend from church. His parents supported his decision to pursue acting and helped him find an academy. Despite initial doubts about his potential success as actor, he worked hard and eventually gained admission to Konkuk University's film department after three attempts.

As first-year student in the Department of Film at Konkuk University, starred in and directed two short films during his college years. Among them, To Father, a story about a visually impaired person, won an award at the Cyworld Film Festival. He learned a lot through directing, but after realizing that acting was his calling, he decided to focus on acting. He graduated with a Bachelor's Degree in Film Arts.

== Career ==
=== Beginning ===
Um Tae-goo's career began with the public release of his first short film, Season's End (2003). His early minor roles in Lady Vengeance (2005) and Epitaph (2007) came in projects where his older brother, film director Um Tae-hwa, served as an assistant director and encouraged him to audition. Prior to Um Tae-goo's full-time acting career, his brother had already established himself by directing short films such as Cactus and Fill the Hole in My Wisdom Tooth, and by working on various commercial films.

The film Epitaph (2007) marked Um's official acting debut, in which he secured a role as a Japanese soldier. Despite diligently memorizing his lines, nervousness—due to this being his first role with dialogue—caused him to forget them, leading to filming delays. He remained on the mountain set, wearing his costume and repeatedly practicing his lines while skipping meals, which led a hiker to mistake him for a real armed guerrilla.

From 2007 to 2010, Um primarily took on bit roles. In 2010, he collaborated with his brother for the third time in the short film Home Sweet Home (Yusukja), where he was cast as a homeless man after another actor dropped out due to the need for a shaved head.

In 2011, Um had small roles in several films, including Insadong Scandal, The Servant, I Saw the Devil, Oki's Movie, and Spellbound. He also played supporting roles in director Park Hyun-seo's KBS Drama Special Perfect Spy. That same year, he starred in his first lead role in the independent film Choked, the debut feature film of director Kim Joong-hyun. The film depicts a family falling apart due to the mother's (Gil Hae-yeon) involvement in a pyramid scheme, with Um portraying Youn-ho, a son grappling with debt and a broken engagement.

In 2012, Um collaborated again with his brother on the short film Forest, where he played the lead role and received an acting award at the 13th Daegu Independent Short Film Festival. The film also won the grand prize at the Mise-en-scène Short Film Festival. That year, director Park Hyun-seok cast Um in his first leading role in a television series, playing Director Jun opposite actress Kim Ye-won in the KBS Drama Special Art. As his career progressed, he began to secure more significant supporting roles in films such as Horror Stories, Secretly, Greatly, and Commitment.

In 2013, Um starred in Um Tae-hwa's first full-length independent film, INGtoogi: The Battle of Internet Trolls, alongside Ryu Hye-young and Kwon Yul. This film, a graduation project for the Korean Academy of Film Arts (KAFA), received support from director Park Chan-wook. Um played Tae-sik, an introverted, unemployed man who is cyberbullied by a user named Man Boobs, seeking revenge by challenging him to a martial arts match with the help of friends.

In 2014, Um gained wider recognition for his portrayal of the villain Dok-ku in the 2014 drama Inspiring Generation. He also worked for the third time with director Park Hyun-seo in the KBS Drama Special Youth.

Um had two releases in 2015. His first appearance was in a supporting role in the JTBC period series More than Maid. He then took on a supporting role in Han Jun-hee's female-led noir film Coin Locker Girl, playing Woo-gon, one of Ma Woo-hee's (played by Kim Hye-soo) adopted children. As the group's "big brother," Woo-gon is responsible for collecting debts, creating fraudulent documents, and using force against those who defy his criminal family. The film was selected to screen in the Critics' Week section of the 2015 Cannes Film Festival.

=== Breakthrough ===
In 2016, Um Tae-goo starred opposite Song Kang-ho as Japanese police officer Hashimoto Kim Jee-woon's period film The Age of Shadows. Um considered Song the most imposing actor whom he had appeared, and he felt that acting with veteran performer profoundly improved his own acting. His performance was praised for its charisma, earning him his first nomination for Best Supporting Actor at the 37th Blue Dragon Film Awards. He went on to win the Best Supporting Actor award at the 53rd Grand Bell Awards.

In the same year, Indie Story held the Wednesday Short Film Theater Indie Story Short Film Showcase titled "3 Men 3 Colors: Koo Kyo-hwan, Nam Yeon-woo, Um Tae-gu" at Seoul Art Cinema, on April 19. Um starred as supporting role in Um Tae-hwa's fantasy film Vanishing Time: A Boy Who Returned, Um plays the adult version of Tae-shik, one of the boys who, along with the main character Sung-min (Gang Dong-won), experiences a "vanishing time" phenomenon after encountering a mysterious glowing egg in a cave.

In 2017, Um reunited with Song Kang-ho in Jang Hoon's historical film A Taxi Driver (2017) making a special appearance as Sergeant Park. Despite his brief four-minute screen time, his powerful performance left a lasting impression. Song Kang-ho recommended Um for the role to the director, based on their previous collaboration.

Um had two film releases in 2018. His first appearance was as the estranged uncle of Lee Jae-in's character in Kim In-sun's full feature directorial debut film Adulthood. Hwang Jae-min took 80 million won in insurance money left to his niece Kyung-eon, and under the pretext of paying it back, he drags his niece into a plan to con the local pharmacist. Director Kim In-sun later recalled that Um, who does not normally drink alcohol, drank a can of beer before filming a karaoke scene because he felt embarrassed singing, and praised his dedication during filming. He then appeared in Kim Kwang-sik's historical action film The Great Battle, playing the cavalry captain Pa-so.

=== Transition to leading roles ===
In 2019, Um starred as Kim Min-cheol in the OCN drama Save Me 2 directed by Lee Kwon. His portrayal of a complex character, balancing roughness with a strong moral compass, was noted as a key factor in the drama's success. He also appeared in Jung Hyuk-ki's film My Punch-drunk Boxer alongside Lee Hye-ri and Kim Hee-won. The movie tells the story of Byung-gu, a retired boxer suffering from dementia pugilistica, who strives to perfect his "Pansori Boxing" technique with the assistance of a new gym member, Min-ji. The film premiered at the Fantasia International Film Festival in 2020, and Um won Best Actor at the 7th Wildflower Film Awards for his role as Byung-gu.

In 2021, Um landed his first leading role in Park Hoon-jung's noir film Night in Paradise as Park Tae-goo, a member of a criminal gang seeking revenge for the murder of his sister and niece. Tae-goo brutally kills Chairman Doh and his men from the Bukseong gang. While on Jeju Island, he meets Jae-yeon (played by Jeon Yeo-been), a terminally ill woman. Director Ma (played by Cha Seung-won) of the Bukseong gang relentlessly pursues Tae-goo for revenge, while Mr. Yang (played by Park Ho-san) ultimately betrays Tae-goo to save himself. Night in Paradise premiered on September 3, 2020, at the 77th Venice International Film Festival in the "Out of Competition" category. The film was released on Netflix on April 9, 2021, quickly rising to the number one spot on Netflix's Top 10 most popular content list.

That same year, Um starred in the tvN mystery thriller drama Hometown alongside Yoo Jae-myung and Han Ye-ri. He played the role of Jo Kyung-ho, a convicted terrorist sentenced to life in prison for a gas attack at the town's train station in 1989.

In 2023, Um made a brief but impactful cameo in Um Tae-hwa's disaster film Concrete Utopia, based on the webtoon Pleasant Outcast by Kim Soongnyung. The screenplay was co-written by Um Tae-hwa and Lee Shin-ji. Um is credited as "homeless person 1" and was selected for his strong presence, which influences the film's flow. Concrete Utopia was released in theaters on August 9, 2023, and screened at the 2023 Toronto International Film Festival in the Gala section on September 9 for the press and September 10 for the public. He also played King Yeomra in the 2023 short film Karma, the directorial debut of Choi Soo-hyuk.

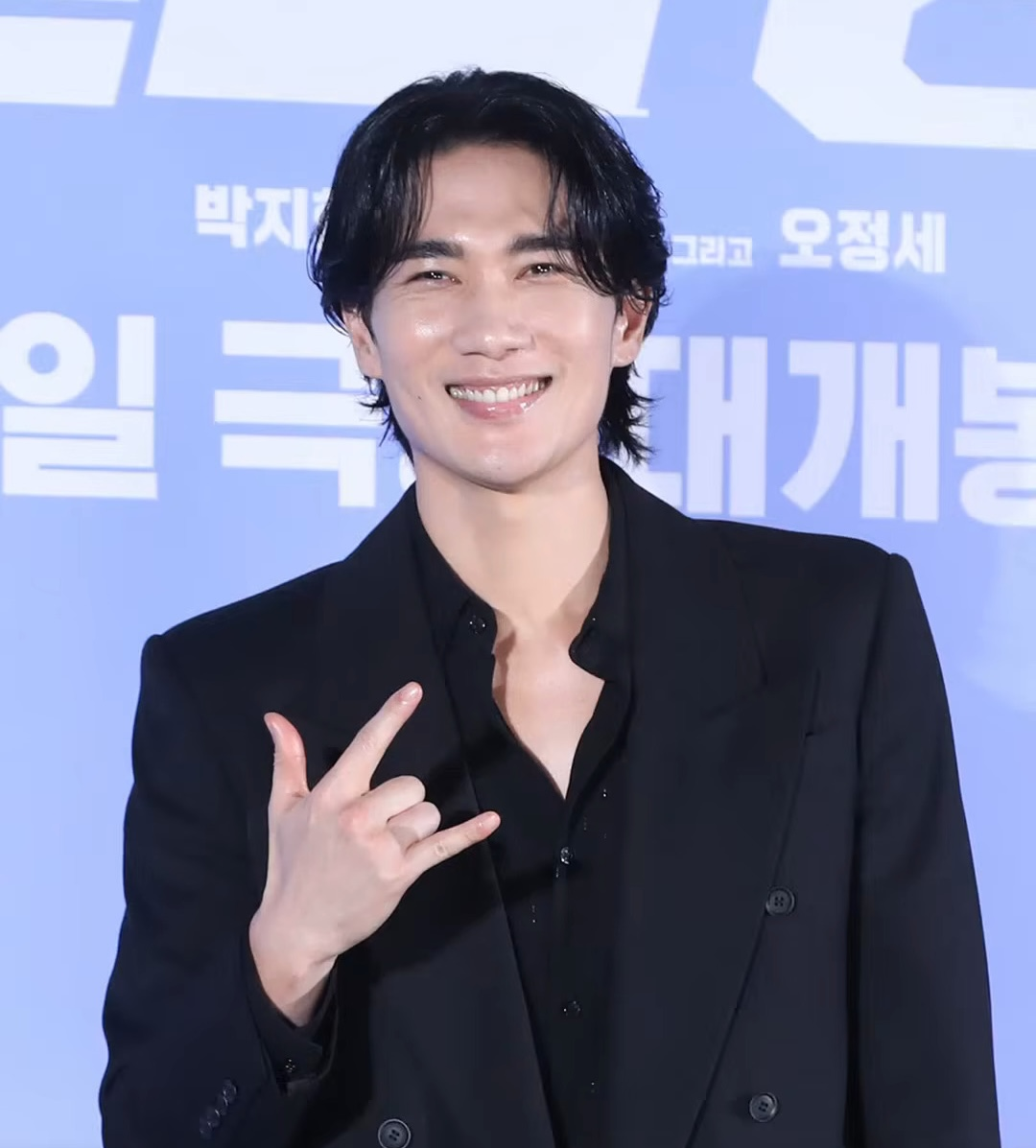
Um at an event for the film Wild Sing in 2026

In 2024, Um reunited with Han Sun-hwa in his first romantic comedy drama, My Sweet Mobster, a project he had committed to two years earlier. The two had previously worked together in his first leading drama, Save Me 2, where they also portrayed each other's love interests. The romantic comedy features a love triangle involving Go Eun-ha, a children's content creator played by Han Sun-hwa, and Seo Ji-hwan, played by Um, a former gangster turned CEO of a meat processing company called Thirsty Deer, with Kwon Yul appearing as Jang Hyeon-woo, a prosecutor. The series was well-received, with Um's portrayal of a lovable character marking a departure from his previous rougher roles. According to Good Data Corporation, Um ranked first for five consecutive weeks in the topicality category for all performer in dramas and non-dramas. He also topped the July actor brand reputation rankings announced by the Korea Enterprise Reputation Research Institute.

In 2026, Um underwent another on-screen transformation, portraying a rapper named Gu Sang-gu in the film Wild Sing.

== Personal life ==
Um is a devout Christian who regularly attends dawn prayers and practices biblical pronunciation. His given name, Tae-goo, is derived from a biblical concept, signifying the nine fruits of the Holy Spirit. Um resides with his dog, Umji, and is a non-drinker, citing his low alcohol tolerance and dislike of alcohol's taste; he enjoys vanilla lattes instead. Although usually a non-drinker, Um has consumed alcohol during filming in isolated instances before scenes he found embarrassing or difficult to approach. He drinks only when he considers it necessary.

== Filmography ==
=== Film ===
Key
| † | Denotes films that have not yet been released |

Film
| Year | Title | Role | Notes | Ref. |
|---|---|---|---|---|
| 2007 | Epitaph | Japanese soldier | | |
| 2008 | Strange Voyage | Jung Chang | Short film | |
| 2008 | I Am Happy | Bar employee | | |
| 2009 | Oh! My God 2 | Tow truck driver | | |
| 2009 | Insadong Scandal | Room salon manager | | |
| 2009 | No Charge Airline Ticket | Dong-hwan | Short film | |
| 2009 | Secret | Man in hat | | |
| 2009 | Anyang, Paradise City | Staff 3 | Short film | |
| 2010 | The Servant | Man next to Mong-ryong | | |
| 2010 | I Saw the Devil | Detective | | |
| 2010 | Oki's Movie | Classmate | Segment "King of Kisses" | |
| 2010 | Midnight FM | Detective Um | | |
| 2010 | Dance for Night | | Short film | |
| 2011 | Nice Shorts! 2011 | Man-shik | Segment "Home Sweet Home" | |
| 2011 | S.I.U. | Skinny Ong-bak | | |
| 2011 | Spellbound | Magic show producer | | |
| 2011 | Keep Quiet | Dong-woo | | |
| 2011 | Heart Vibrator | Tae-goo | | |
| 2012 | Choked | Kwon Yoon-ho | | |
| 2012 | Beast Is My Middle Name | | Short film | |
| 2012 | Horror Stories | Delivery man / gunman | Segment "Sun and Moon" | |
| 2012 | Forest | Tae-shik | Short film | |
| 2013 | Azooma | Officer at police substation | | |
| 2013 | Incomplete Life: Prequel | Hwan-young | | |
| 2013 | Secretly, Greatly | Hwang Jae-oh | | |
| 2013 | Commitment | Bully | | |
| 2013 | Ingtoogi: The Battle of Internet Trolls | Tae-shik | | |
| 2014 | Obsessed | Warrant officer Kim | | |
| 2015 | Barracks | Dong-woo | | |
| 2015 | Coin Locker Girl | Woo Gon | | |
| 2015 | Minority Opinion | Lee Seung-joon | | |
| 2015 | Veteran | Jo Tae-oh's bodyguard | | |
| 2016 | The Age of Shadows | Hashimoto | | |
| 2016 | Vanishing Time: A Boy Who Returned | Tae-shik | | |
| 2017 | Chae's Movie Theater | Master | | |
| 2017 | Trivial Matters | Do-hwan | Short film | |
| 2017 | A Taxi Driver | Sergeant first class Park | | |
| 2018 | Adulthood | Hwang Jae-min | | |
| 2018 | The Great Battle | Pa-so | | |
| 2019 | My Punch-Drunk Boxer | Lee Byung-goo | | |
| 2020 | Night in Paradise | Park Tae-goo | | |
| 2022 | The Witch: Part 2. The Other One | Mart customers | Cameo | |
| 2023 | Faith | C | Short film | |
| 2023 | Concrete Utopia | Homeless man | Cameo | |
| 2023 | Cobweb | Handsome star | Cameo | |
| 2023 | Karma | King Yeomra | Short film | |
| 2026 | Wild Sing | Gu Sang-gu | | |

=== Television series ===
Key
| † | Denotes television productions that have not yet been released |

Series acting credit of Um
| Year | Title | Role | Notes | Ref. |
|---|---|---|---|---|
| 2008 | Love Marriage | Flower secretary | | |
| 2008 | Detective Mr. Lee | | | |
| 2009 | Tamra, the Island | Jeon Chi-yong (young) | | |
| 2010 | Bad Guy | Hong Tae-ra's bodyguard | | |
| 2011 | Drama Special Series: "Perfect Spy" | Uhm Tae-goo | | |
| 2012 | KBS Drama Special: "Art" | Associate director | | |
| 2013 | KBS Drama Special: "The Devil Rider" | Kyung-chool | | |
| 2014 | Inspiring Generation | Do-goo | | |
| 2014 | KBS Drama Special: "Youth" | Jong-bum | | |
| 2015 | More Than a Maid | Chi-bok | | |
| 2019 | Save Me 2 | Kim Min-cheol | First television leading role | |
| 2021 | Hometown | Jo Kyung-ho | | |
| 2021 | Dr. Brain | Lee Tae-goo | Special appearance | |
| 2024 | My Sweet Mobster | Seo Ji-hwan / Yoon Hyeon-woo | First romantic comedy | |
| 2024 | Light Shop | Kim Hyun-min | | |
| 2025 | Tempest | Kim Han-sang | Special appearance | |
| 2027 | Born Guilty † | Ssaengdak | | |

=== Music video appearances ===
| Year | Title | Artist | Role | Ref. |
|---|---|---|---|---|
| 2024 | "그리워 (Monologue)" | Jukjae | Main character | |
| 2025 | "Me+You" | Twice | Next door neighbor | |

== Accolades ==
=== Awards and nominations ===
Name of the award ceremony, year presented, category, nominated work and the result of the nomination
| Award | Year | Category | Nominated work | Result | Ref. |
|---|---|---|---|---|---|
| Asia Artist Awards | 2024 | Popularity Award – Actor | My Sweet Mobster | Nominated | |
| Asia Model Awards | 2024 | Asia Star Award (Actor) | My Sweet Mobster | Won | |
| Baeksang Arts Awards | 2016 | Best Supporting Actor | Coin Locker Girl | Nominated | |
| Baeksang Arts Awards | 2017 | Best Supporting Actor | The Age of Shadows | Nominated | |
| Blue Dragon Film Awards | 2016 | Best Supporting Actor | The Age of Shadows | Nominated | |
| Buil Film Awards | 2015 | Best Supporting Actor | Coin Locker Girl | Nominated | |
| Buil Film Awards | 2017 | Best Supporting Actor | The Age of Shadows | Nominated | |
| Buil Film Awards | 2021 | Best Actor | Night in Paradise | Nominated | |
| Chunsa Film Art Awards | 2019 | Special Popularity Award | The Great Battle | Won | |
| Daegu Independent Short Film Festival | 2012 | Acting Award | Forest | Won | |
| Fundex Awards | 2024 | Best Actor – TV Drama | My Sweet Mobster | Nominated | |
| Golden Cinematography Awards | 2017 | Best Supporting Actor | The Age of Shadows | Won | |
| Grand Bell Awards | 2016 | Best Supporting Actor | The Age of Shadows | Won | |
| KAFA Feature Film Program 10th Anniversary Awards | 2016 | KAFA's 10 Guards Award (Note: Award presented to 10 actors for their contributions to and for bringing recognition to films produced through the Korean Academy of Film Arts (KAFA) Feature Film Program.) | Ingtoogi: The Battle of Internet Trolls | Won | |
| Seoul Global Movie Awards | 2024 | Special Jury Award | My Sweet Mobster | Won | |
| Star Night - Korea Top Star Awards Ceremony | 2016 | Special Jury Award | The Age of Shadows | Won | |
| Wildflower Film Awards | 2014 | Best Actor | Ingtoogi: The Battle of Internet Trolls | Nominated | |
| Wildflower Film Awards | 2020 | Best Actor | My Punch-Drunk Boxer | Won | |

=== Listicles ===
Name of publisher, year listed, name of listicle, and placement
| Publisher | Year | Listicle | Placement | Ref. |
|---|---|---|---|---|
| Korean Film Council | 2021 | Korean Actors 200 (Note: Introduces 200 actors that best represent the present and future of Korean cinema to the people in the film industry all over the world.) | Included | |
