= My Ordinary Love Story =

- Theatrical poster
- Directed by: Lee Kwon
- Written by: Lee Kwon
- Produced by: Lee Seo-jeong
- Starring: Kang Ye-won; Song Sae-byeok
- Cinematography: Back Yoon-seuk
- Edited by: Kyung Min-ho; Choi Kyung-yoon
- Music by: Jang Young-gyu; Dalpalan
- Release dates: July 25, 2014 (PiFan); August 20, 2014 (South Korea)
- Running time: 93 minutes
- Country: South Korea
- Language: Korean

My Ordinary Love Story (Korean: 내 연애의 기억; RR: Nae yeonaeui gieok; lit. 'The Memory of My Romance') is a 2014 South Korean romantic comedy thriller starring Kang Ye-won and Song Sae-byeok. It was the closing film of the 18th Bucheon International Fantastic Film Festival.

== Plot ==
Eun-jin struggles to make her seventh relationship work after six failed ones. But she begins to suspect that her new boyfriend, bumbling but sweet Hyun-suk, may be hiding something.

== Cast ==
- Kang Ye-won as Park Eun-jin
- Song Sae-byeok as Hyun-suk
- Greena Park as So-young
- Kim Hyun-joon as Park Eun-kyul
- Woo Hye-jin as Girl in cafe
