= SM Pictures =

South Korean company

SM Pictures Co., Ltd.
- Native name: 에스엠픽쳐스
- Formerly: Bitwin
- Company type: Public
- Traded as: KRX: 066410
- Founded: February 5, 1999; 26 years ago
- Defunct: June 2008
- Fate: Acquired by Premiere Entertainment
- Successor: PRE
- Headquarters: 4–5F, Dongshin Building, 600-2, Sinsa-dong, Gangnam, Seoul, South Korea
- Key people: Han Se-min (CEO)
- Services: Production; Distribution
- Owner: SM Entertainment (33.94%)

SM Pictures (Korean: 에스엠픽쳐스) was a South Korean DVD distribution and film import company under SM Entertainment. It was founded on February 5, 1999, as Bitwin under Arcom Studio and was later acquired by SM before its company renaming. The company consequently closed down after losses, and by June 13, 2008, SM had transferred its remaining stake to Premier Entertainment (later PRE-GM and Candle Media).

== History ==
=== 1999–2007: Establishment and acquisition by SM Entertainment ===
Arcom Studio commenced on February 5, 1999, under the name Bitwin, with the company carrying out its name in the industry by producing DVDs for Korean movies for the first time in Korea. The DVDs produced at the time were Whispering Corridors (1998), Shiri (1999), and The Spy (1999). The company then drew investments from Samsung Venture, Dongyang Investment Bank, and Kibo Capital, succeeding in being a listed company on the KOSDAQ in 2003. On March 16, 2007, Bitwin held a shareholders' meeting and announced that it would change its name to SM Pictures after being acquired by SM Entertainment and foster its "global" video business. The DVD production and distribution company appointed Han Se-min, then general director of SM Entertainment's IR and global business and co-representative of Bitwin, as its sole chief executive officer (CEO).

SM Pictures have planned to partake in the production and investment of video products such as movies and dramas, as well as its existing DVD production and distribution business, which would lead to a more "functioning" video business. The company has also intended to produce movies and dramas through self-production and co-production, making "high-quality" video content by securing "top-notch" professionals and developing its business areas throughout the local and international film industry exports and imports. SM would independently or jointly produce video content through the company and supply it through different platforms. Additionally, it had prepared to develop into the international distribution business of movies and dramas by securing major distribution channels in the Americas, Japan, China, and Pan-Asia through overseas partners. On May 15, 2007, KTH announced that it had signed a copyright contract with the company for video content to be delivered through new media and online channels, with secured internet copyrights for the theater drama Vacation (2006) and the movie The Painted Veil (2006), owned by SM Pictures. The company had also signed a full-licensing contract with 20th Century Fox in Korea and had scheduled to release 17 titles.

In November 2007, SM Pictures announced that it would carry out a paid-in capital increase of 16.9 billion won to acquire childhood education company Kinder Schule, which resulted in the company's stock price hitting the upper limit. By December 4, it has decided to cancel and withdraw the decision to raise capital for the educational project through third-party allocation. The company revealed that the two involved companies had "disagreements that could not be narrowed down," which failed acquisition negotiations. Moreover, the KOSDAQ Market Headquarters of the Stock Exchange allocated a preliminary notice of designation as an unfaithful disclosure corporation for SM Pictures, which inverted its disclosure on the same day. Eventually, Kinder Schule was acquired by SH Tech.

=== 2008–2009: Closure and acquisition by Premiere Entertainment ===
SM Pictures' first film, Attack on the Pin-Up Boys (2007), mobilized only about 102,600 viewers; however, with a net production cost of 850 million won, excluding printing and marketing costs, about 240,000 moviegoers had to see the movie to avoid losses. Still, less than half of that audience watched the film and suffered a defeat at the box office. The company closed down after failing to achieve [satisfactory] results for its film. On June 13, 2008, SM Entertainment then transferred its 33.94% stake in SM Pictures to Premier Entertainment to reorganize its business structures. SM has transferred 5.15 million shares of the company to Premier for 15.24 billion won to recover investment funds. Lee Soo-man also sold his 5.6% share in the company to Premier for 2.5 million US dollars, giving Premiere control of over 40% of the company and changing SM Pictures's name to PRE.

== Production works ==
List of production works showing the year, title, and associated production
Year	Title	Associated production	Ref.
2007	Attack on the Pin-Up Boys	Pollux Pictures	
