= Lee Joo-won =

South Korean child actor (born 2011)

- Born: May 3, 2011 (age 15); Seoul, South Korea
- Education: Balsan Middle School
- Occupation: Actor
- Years active: 2017–present

Korean name
- Hangul: 이주원
- RR: I Juwon
- MR: I Chuwŏn

Lee Joo-won (Korean: 이주원; born May 3, 2011), is a South Korean child actor. He made his acting debut in the 2017 drama Dal Soon's Spring. He is best known for his role as Yi Seok-cheol in the 2022 film The Night Owl. He is also known for his portrayal of young Dan Hwal in the drama Bulgasal: Immortal Souls (2021).

== Filmography ==
=== Film ===
Year	Title	Role	Notes	Ref.
2017	Survival Guide		Short film	
2018	Deja Vu	young Cha In-tae		
2019	My First Client	Kim Min-joon		
2019	Beautiful Voice	Bit part		
2019	A Boy and Sungreen	Bit part		
2021	Mission: Possible	Do Doo-ho		
2022	Stellar: A Magical Ride	young Yeong Bae		
2022	Land Mine			
2022	The Night Owl	Yi Seok-cheol		

=== Television series ===
Year	Title	Role	Notes	Ref.
2017	Dal Soon's Spring	Bok Nam		
2017	Voice	Hwang Ji-wook	Cameo	
2018	Mother	Tae Hoon		
2018	Children of a Lesser God	Child of the church		
2018	Your Honor	Han Kang-ho / Han Su-ho (child)		
2018	Voice Season 2	Hwang Ji-wook	Cameo (Ep. 2–3)	
2018	My Secret Terrius	Jo Seung-hyun		
2019	Best Chicken		Cameo	
2019	The Crowned Clown	Lee Yul	Cameo	
2019	The Secret Life of My Secretary	young Ki Dae-ju		
2019	Golden Garden	young Cha Pil-seung		
2019	Catch the Ghost	Choi Ji-hwan	Cameo (Ep. 3–4)	
2020	Born Again	Sung Ho	Cameo (Ep. 2)	
2020	Graceful Friends	Ji-wook		
2020	Tale of the Nine Tailed	young Lee Rang		
2021	Sisyphus: The Myth	young Seo Won-ju		
2021	You Are My Spring	Choi Jung-min / Ian Chase (child)		
2021	Chimera	young Lee Tae-young		
2021	The Red Sleeve	young Yi San		
2021	Bulgasal: Immortal Souls	young Dan Hwal		
2021	Moonshine	Shim Heon (child)		
2022	Juvenile Justice	Yun Ji-hu	Cameo (Ep. 1–2)	
2022	If You Wish Upon Me	Yoon Kyeo-re (child)		
2022	Stock Struck	Im Ye-jun		
2023	Joseon Attorney	Lee Bong-sam's son	Cameo (Ep. 7–8)	
2023	Meant to Be	Ha Jin-woo (child)		
2023	Live Your Own Life	Lee Philip		
2023	Song of the Bandits	young Lee Yoon		
2023	Vigilante	young Kim Ji-yong		
2024	Love Song for Illusion	young Sajo Hyun		
2024	Queen of Tears	young Yoon Eun-seong		
2024	My Sweet Mobster	child Yoon Hyeon-woo		
2026	If Wishes Could Kill	young Kang Ha-joon		

== Awards and nominations ==
Name of the award ceremony, year presented, category, nominee of the award, and the result of the nomination
Award ceremony	Year	Category	Nominee / Work	Result	Ref.
APAN Star Awards	2024	Best Child Actor	Queen of Tears, My Sweet Mobster	Won	
KBS Drama Awards	2023	Best Young Actor	Live Your Own Life	Nominated	
KBS Drama Awards	2024	Best Young Actor	Love Song for Illusion	Nominated	
