= Hometown (South Korean TV series) =

2021 South Korean television series

- Promotional poster
- Hangul: 홈타운
- RR: Homtaun
- MR: Homt'aun
- Genre: Mystery; Thriller
- Written by: Joo Jin (Note: Joo Jin is the pen name of director Cho Hyun-hoon, who was pointed out as one of the perpetrators of the Me Too movement in 2018.)
- Directed by: Park Hyun-seok
- Starring: Yoo Jae-myung; Han Ye-ri; Uhm Tae-goo
- Composer: Choi Seong-kwon
- Country of origin: South Korea
- Original language: Korean
- No. of episodes: 12

Production
- Executive producer: Kim Geon-hong
- Producers: Kwon Byung-wook; Baek Chang-joo
- Running time: 60 minutes
- Production companies: Studio Dragon; C-JeS Entertainment

Original release
- Network: tvN
- Release: September 22 – October 28, 2021

Hometown (Korean: 홈타운; RR: Homtaun) is a 2021 South Korean television series starring Yoo Jae-myung, Han Ye-ri and Uhm Tae-goo. It aired on tvN from September 22 to October 28, 2021.

== Synopsis ==
Set in 1999, Hometown tells about a bizarre murder in a small town. It finds the truth of a recording tape containing mysterious serial killings.

== Plot ==
The series follows Jung-hyun, a young woman living in the town of Saju in 1999 with her adoptive mother and her niece Jae-yeong. She is the younger sister of Kyung-ho, a notorious hypnotist responsible for a nerve gas terrorist attack at a train station in 1987 that killed more than 200 people. Because of her connection to him, Jung-hyun and her family live under constant suspicion and hostility from the townspeople.

Detective Choi, whose wife died in the 1987 attack, remains deeply traumatized by the tragedy. His life becomes entangled with Jung-hyun’s when a high school student murders her mother after encountering a mysterious woman who appears to command her to do so. Around the same time, Jae-yeong and her classmates receive a strange audio tape containing distorted sounds and static, which begins to circulate among students.

As Detective Choi investigates the murder and Jung-hyun searches for her missing niece, the story alternates between 1999 and events in 1987. During their high school years, Jung-hyun and her classmates had explored abandoned buildings marked with strange symbols and ritual tables connected to a secretive organization known as the Yongjin cult. The group worships a mysterious figure called the “Guru” and distributes unusual tapes and candies linked to drugs imported from Japan.

Gradually, the present-day investigation reveals that many of the people connected to those earlier events have forgotten what happened in 1987. When some of Jung-hyun’s former classmates begin receiving the mysterious tapes again, they experience vivid hallucinations and disturbing dreams about the woman they once encountered. Several individuals connected to the past soon die under unexplained circumstances, deepening the mystery surrounding the cult and its influence in the town.

Detective Choi’s investigation uncovers connections between the Yongjin cult, organized crime, and powerful political figures, including his former father-in-law, the influential politician Im In-gwan. At the same time, Jung-hyun learns that her niece Jae-yeong may have been chosen by the cult as a successor connected to her brother Kyung-ho.

The investigation ultimately leads Jung-hyun and Choi to an abandoned factory where the cult gathers for a ritual involving the mysterious tape. As members prepare for what appears to be a mass suicide, Jung-hyun and Choi attempt to stop the event. However, Im In-gwan intervenes and releases nerve gas into the facility, killing most of the cult members.

In the aftermath, Jung-hyun confronts Kyung-ho in prison, where further revelations emerge about the past and the true origins of the cult’s influence. Detective Choi also learns that his late wife had secretly been involved in Kyung-ho’s plans, forcing him to reconsider everything he believed about the tragedy that shaped his life.

Following Kyung-ho’s death and the collapse of the Yongjin cult, the truth behind the mysterious tapes, the hallucinations, and the events of 1987 remains only partially understood. Jung-hyun and Jae-yeong attempt to move forward with their lives, while Detective Choi is left confronting the unresolved questions and psychological scars left behind by the case.

== Cast ==
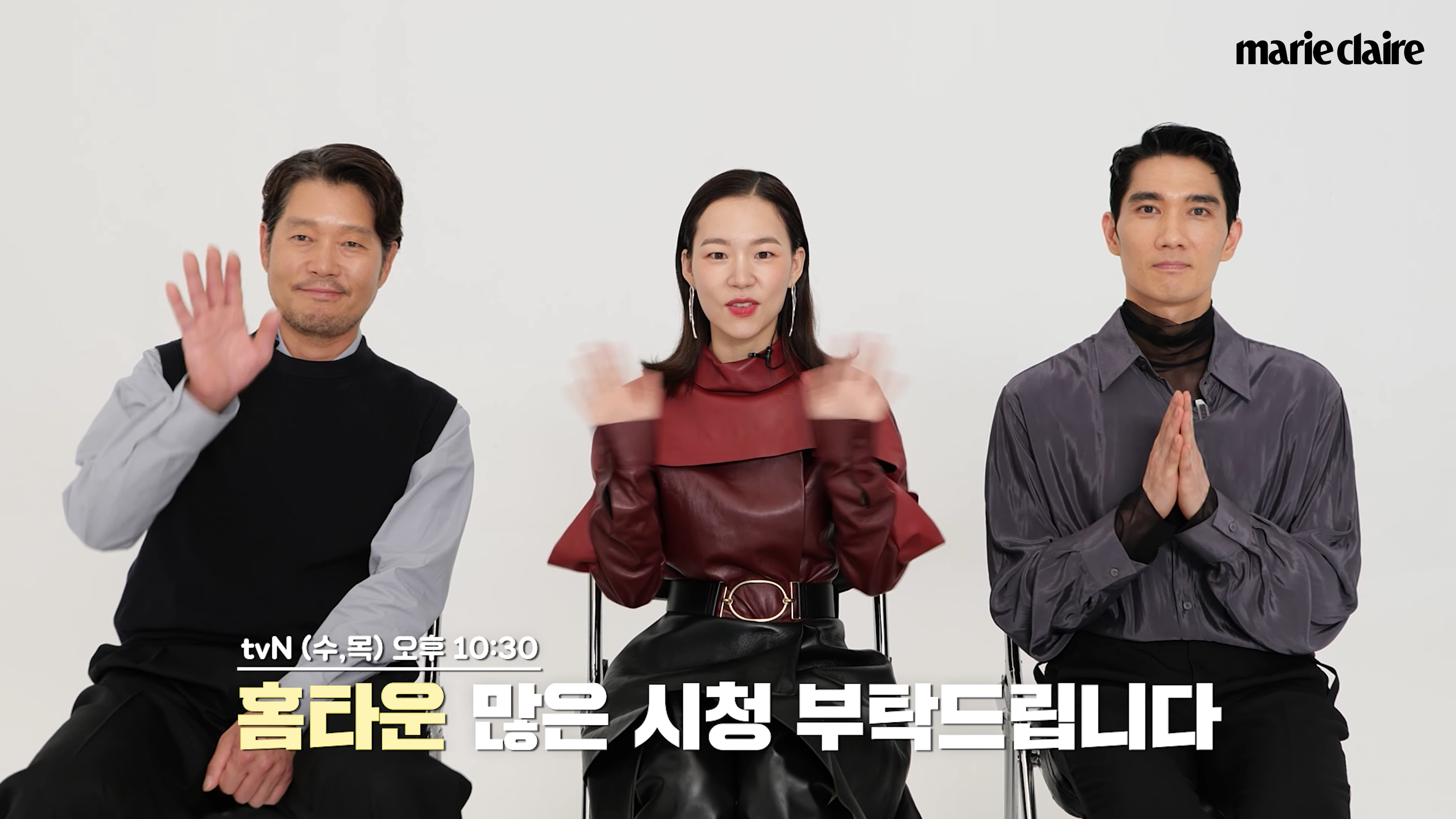
Main cast (L to R: Yoo Jae-myung, Han Ye-ri, Uhm Tae-goo) promoting the series on Marie Claire Korea in September 2021

=== Main ===
- Yoo Jae-myung as Choi Hyung-in, a veteran violent crime detective with fifteen years of experience who is living in misery after losing his wife to a horrific terrorist crime.
- Han Ye-ri as Jo Jung-hyun, Kyung-ho's sister who lives with the social stigma of being a terrorist's family. Ironically, her life was destroyed by her brother's crime, but was reconstructed through his daughter.
  - Song Ji-hyun as young Jo Jung-hyun
- Uhm Tae-goo as Jo Kyung-ho, a convicted terrorist who is sentenced to life in prison for committing a gas attack in the town's train station in 1989.

=== Supporting ===
==== People around Hyung-in ====
- Kim Sae-byuk as Im Se-yoon, Hyung-in's wife.
- Choi Kwang-il as Im In-gwan, Hyung-in's father-in-law.
- Song Young-chang as Yang Won-taek, Hyung-in's boss.
- Jo Bok-rae as Lee Si-jeong, a passionate detective with four years of experience.
- Tae In-ho as Son Ji-seung, a prosecutor.

==== People around Jung-hyun ====
- Lee Re as Jo Jae-young, Kyung-ho's daughter who is a middle school student. She is living with her aunt Jung-hyun, but suddenly disappears.
- Park Mi-hyeon as Kim Kyung-sook, Kyung-ho's mother and Jae-young's grandmother.
- Lee Hae-woon as Jung Young-seop, Jung-hyun's classmate and head of the editorial department of Gyeongcheon High School.
- Kim Jung as Jung Min-jae, Jung-hyun's classmate and member of the editorial department of Gyeongcheon High School.
- Cha Rae-hyung as Kang Yong-tak, Jung-hyun's classmate and member of the editorial department of Gyeongcheon High School.
- Kim Ye-eun as Choi Kyung-joo, Jung-hyun's best friend since high school.

==== Gyeongcheon Girls' Middle School students ====
- Heo Jung-eun as Moon Sook, Jae-young's best friend.
- Park Si-yeon as Production Director Jung
- Park Seo-jin as DJ Han
- Kim Ji-an as Lee Kyung-jin

==== Others ====
- Kim Shin-bi as Kim Hwan-gyu, a Chinese restaurant employee who lives an honest life after leaving a bad past behind.
- Yoo Seong-ju as Pastor Woo
- Kim Soo-jin as Jung Min-sil

== Production ==
Hometown was first announced to be aired on OCN. It was also included in OCN's promotional video for its 2021 line-up. However, in July 2021, it was confirmed that the series aired on tvN instead.

== Viewership ==
Hometown : South Korea viewers per episode (thousands)

Season	Episode number											
Season	1	2	3	4	5	6	7	8	9	10	11	12
1	674	693	515	386	466	372	287	N/A	N/A	N/A	N/A	295

Source: Audience measurement performed nationwide by Nielsen Korea.

Average TV viewership ratings
Ep.	Original broadcast date	Average audience share (Nielsen Korea)	
Ep.	Original broadcast date	Nationwide	Seoul
1	September 22, 2021	2.827% (2nd)	3.090% (2nd)
2	September 23, 2021	3.307% (2nd)	4.303% (2nd)
3	September 29, 2021	2.582% (2nd)	2.781% (2nd)
4	September 30, 2021	2.043% (2nd)	2.376% (2nd)
5	October 6, 2021	1.970% (3rd)	2.246% (2nd)
6	October 7, 2021	1.644% (3rd)	1.845% (2nd)
7	October 13, 2021	1.326% (N/A)	1.245% (9th)
8	October 14, 2021	1.277% (8th)	1.330% (7th)
9	October 20, 2021	1.055% (N/A)	1.142% (N/A)
10	October 21, 2021	1.074% (N/A)	1.030% (N/A)
11	October 27, 2021	1.163% (N/A)	1.242% (N/A)
12	October 28, 2021	1.520% (6th)	1.494% (7th)
In the table above, the blue numbers represent the lowest ratings and the red numbers represent the highest ratings.; N/A denotes that the rating/ranking is not known.; This series aired on a cable channel/pay TV which normally has a relatively smaller audience compared to free-to-air TV/public broadcasters (KBS, SBS, MBC and EBS).
