= Attack on the Pin-Up Boys =

2007 South Korean high school mystery/comedy film by Lee Kwon

- Theatrical release poster
- Hangul: 꽃미남 연쇄 테러사건
- RR: Kkonminam yeonswae tereo sageon
- MR: Kkonminam yŏnswae t'erŏ sakŏn
- Directed by: Lee Kwon
- Screenplay by: Park Yeon-seon
- Starring: Super Junior
- Narrated by: Kim Ki-bum
- Cinematography: Lee Young-hoon
- Edited by: Song Soo-a; Na Dong-joo
- Music by: Choi Dong-hoon
- Production companies: SM Pictures; Pollux Pictures
- Distributed by: Chungeorahm; M&FC
- Release date: 26 July 2007
- Running time: 81 minutes
- Country: South Korea
- Language: Korean
- Budget: ₩850 million
- Box office: US$631,034

Attack on the Pin-Up Boys, also known as Flower Boys' Series of Terror Events or simply Flower Boys (Korean: 꽃미남 연쇄 테러사건), is a 2007 South Korean high school mystery comedy film, and is the first film produced by SM Pictures, a subsidiary of SM Entertainment. It is also the first full-length film directed by Lee Kwon. The film stars all members of the boy band Super Junior, with the exception of Kyuhyun who was injured and still recovering from a car accident on 19 April 2007.

The story centres around a series of attacks on popular high school students or commonly called flower boys that occurred on the 14th of each month, which started on Valentine's Day. Some students — Kibum (played by Kim Ki-bum) and Donghae (played by Lee Dong-hae) — decide to investigate the incidents and find the culprit, while some targeted students; Heechul (played by Kim Hee-chul) and Kangin (played by Kim Young-woon) try to bait the culprit into attacking them so as to raise their popularity.

The film premiered on 16 July 2007 at Megabox Sinchon in Seoul and was released theatrically on 26 July 2007 in South Korea. It received seven nominations at the 2007 Korea Movie Star Awards.

== Plot ==
Two Neulparan High School students, Kibum and Donghae, were talking about the recent attacks on the flower boys who attended neighbouring high schools. On Valentine's Day, which fell on 14 February, Lee Sungmin from Garam High School, who is popular because of his looks, was attacked upon returning from school. He had a bag of faeces being thrown at his face. On 14 March, Hangeng, a basketball star player from Geosang High School was attacked in the same manner. The most recent incident, which occurred on 14 April, had Kim Yesung, vocalist of a rock band from Nadam High School, as its victim.

Kibum concluded that the next victim would be a student from their school. He decided to run an investigation on the case, since his reporting on the incidents had brought popularity to his blog. He wrote on his blog that he predicted the next victim would be either Choi Siwon, the president of the student body council, Heechul, the stylish president of the dance club, or Kangin, the captain of the judo team who became a school champion by only mastering one move, ippon seoi nage.

Mainstream media finally picked up on reporting the cases, and dubbed the case as Attack on the Pin-up Boys, which caused the victims' popularity to skyrocket. Sungmin became a model and signed a three-year contract with a modelling agency. Yesung became a signed artist and released a successful solo album. Seeing this, both Heechul and Kangin try to increase their popularity by uploading attractive pictures on their blogs, in hopes that the perpetrator would choose them as the next victim.

On 14 May, all students were anticipating the attacks. Kibum and his classmate, Donghae, were stuck in an extra class as their class had received the lowest score among other classes. Donghae managed to sneak out in the middle of the class to carry out the investigation. The next morning, Kibum received news that Siwon claimed that he was attacked the day before. After investigating the claim, Kibum concluded that the attack was faked by Siwon himself, as the attack was carried out differently. Heechul and Kangin continued with their campaigns to be the next victim.

Donghae, who was also a member of the dance club, told Heechul that he had figured out that the perpetrator will attack the victim near the garbage dumping ground between 9 and 10 pm. When Heechul went to said location, he came across Kangin. It turned out that they both had the same idea. Meanwhile, Donghae, who was tailing Kibum, called out to him and accused Kibum of being the culprit. Donghae deduced that the reason that there was no attack being carried out on 14 May is because they were held back by extra classes. Kibum admitted his fault but instead of exposing him, Donghae proposed an alternative plan.

The next day, Donghae received much attention from the school students, as he had become the newest and the final victim of the serial attacks. The interest toward the case finally faded after a few months went by without a new incident. Donghae asked Kibum where he got the faeces from but Kibum refused to answer.

== Cast ==
The cast are as follows: (Note: Members of Super Junior are credited by their birth names instead of their stage names.)

- Kim Ki-bum of Super Junior as Kibum, a student of Neulparan High School, the narrator and an amateur detective
- Choi Si-won of Super Junior as Siwon, the president of the student body council
- Kim Young-woon of Super Junior as Kangin, the captain of the judo team
- Kim Hee-chul of Super Junior as Heechul, the president of the dance club; the Ultra Junior
- Lee Donghae of Super Junior as Donghae, a member of the dance club, and Kibum's best friend
- Kim Ryeo-wook of Super Junior as Kim Ryeowook, the vice president of the student body council
- Lee Hyuk-jae of Super Junior as Eunhyuk, a member of the judo team
- Shin Dong-hee of Super Junior as Shindong, a member of the dance club
- Park Jeong-su of Super Junior as the School Panda mascot
- Lee Sung-min of Super Junior as Sungmin, a student from Garam High School
- Han Geng of Super Junior as Hangeng, a student from Geosang High School and a basketball player
- Kim Jong-woon of Super Junior as Kim Yesung, a student from Nadam High School and a rock band vocalist
- Kwon Byung-gil as the school principal
- Jung In-gi as the coach of the judo team
- Kim Mi-ya as a female teacher
- Kim Seok-joo as a betting teacher
- Jo Mun-ui as a doctor
- Choi In-sook as narrator
- Kwon Yu-ri of Girls' Generation as a ballerina

=== Cameo appearances ===
- Suho of EXO as a member of Yesung's band
- Henry Lau of Super Junior-M – sleepy boy, background dancer during "Wonder Boy"
- Key of Shinee – background dancer during "Wonder Boy"

== Production ==
=== Development and pre-production ===
The film was planned as early as 2005 by the CEO of the entertainment company, SM Entertainment; Lee Soo-man. In 2007, SM Entertainment acquired Bitwin, a South Korean DVD production and distribution company. After becoming a subsidiary of SM Entertainment, the company changed its name to SM Pictures after a shareholder meeting on 16 March 2007. On 11 May 2007, SM Pictures announced that it will venture into film production by producing its first film, Attack on the Pin-Up Boys, with Pollux Pictures as its co-producer. On 29 June 2007, it was revealed that Cheongarahm, a film production company which had produced hit-movies such as The Host will be distributing the film.

The new production company also revealed that the film will be directed by Lee Kwon, with members of the boy band Super Junior as the main cast. Park Jeong-su of Super Junior, or his stage name, Leeteuk, was originally cast as the president of the school dance club, but since he was involved in a car accident on 19 April 2007, that left him and band-mate Kyuhyun injured, his place was taken by band-mate Kim Hee-chul. Kim Hee-chul's original role as the first victim of the serial attacks in the film was replaced by band-mate Lee Sung-min. Kyuhyun who received the most injury from the accident; right rib fracture, pneumothorax pulmonary hemorrhage, pelvic bone fracture, hemoperitoneum, and foot fracture, ultimately did not participate in the filming to focus on recovering. Kyuhyun's original role as the basketball player from Geosang High School was taken by band-mate, Han Geng.

Principal photography started in April 2007 and was completed in fifty days, with the film being set to hit the cinema during school's summer vacation. The estimated cost of the film's production is between ₩850 million to ₩900 million, which was about one third of the average cost of other Korean movies.

=== Theme ===
CEO of SM Entertainment, Lee Soo-man stated that the film is not an idol film; a film that are geared towards the fans of the idol who acted in the film, such as H.O.T.'s Age of Peace or Sechs Kies' Seventeen, but a children's film that can be enjoyed by everyone. Star News, a Korean entertainment news website, noted that the film is full of references to the youth culture, such as obsession with blog views and being popular.

The film is officially a high school mystery-comedy film, but the marketing team used the term "high school mystery comic" to describe the film's genre. However, some of the audience interpreted Attack on the Pin-Up Boys as a "comic fantasy sci-fi action" film, as there is a scene where Siwon shot a laser beam towards Ryeowook using his hand.

=== Soundtrack ===
The soundtrack of the film, "Wonder Boy" was sung by Super Junior and its music video was released on 10 July 2007, ahead of the film's premiere. The soundtrack album was released on 26 July 2007 and contain ten tracks altogether. Other songs that were released in the soundtrack album are "Show and Prove" sung by Dead'P, "Are You Ready?" sung by Yesung and "Rock the Floor" sung by Marco. The film's score was composed by a new composer, Choi Dong-hoon, and it was his first experience in producing a film score.

== Release ==
=== Marketing ===
The film's poster was revealed on 28 June 2007. The poster depicted all twelve main cast, making a record of having the most protagonist being depicted on a Korean movie poster at that time. The poster received criticism and was accused of plagiarizing the cover of Beastie Boys Video Anthology, a video clips compilation DVD of an American hip hop group, Beastie Boys. However, both images were noted to share similarities with the poster of the American historical film, Ben-Hur.

Poster of Attack on the Pin-Up Boys

Cover of Beastie Boys Video Anthology

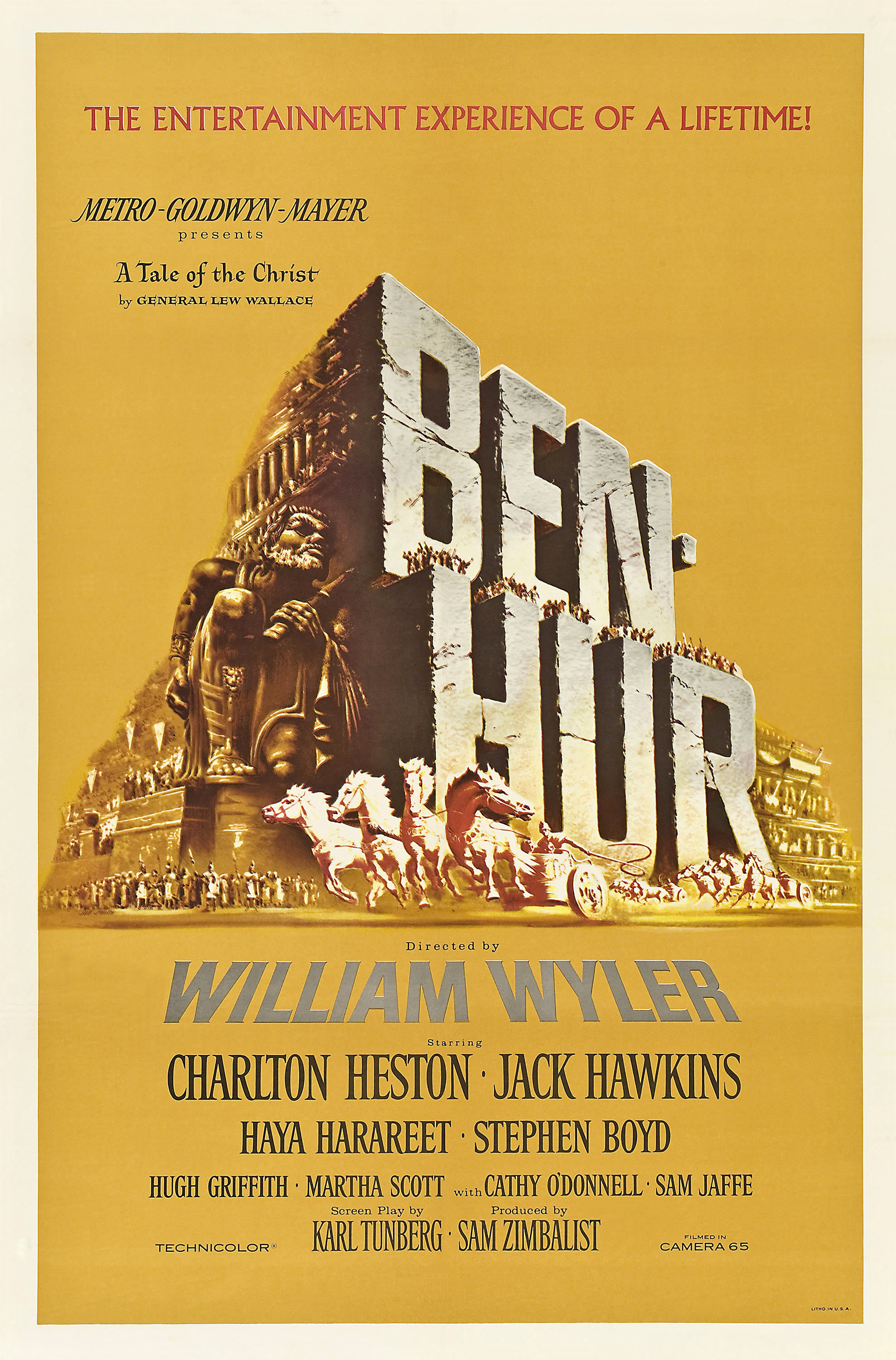
Poster of Ben-Hur

The film's trailer was revealed at the SM Town Summer Concert which was held at Olympic Gymnastics Arena on 30 June and 1 July 2007. As soon as the trailer was released, it quickly rose to number one search term ranking in Korean web search engine.

The main cast; members of the boy band Super Junior, held many stage greetings to promote their film, and became the largest event of its kind. Unlike other Korean films which held stage greetings only on its premiere, the cast targeted to go to at least a hundred theaters in eleven days to greet the audience. Because of the time constraint and tight schedule, the actors use a strategy that roughly translated to "being all over the place like Hong Gil-dong" and went to multiple greetings in smaller groups, with three to four actors in a group. As of 2 August 2007, the cast had come to 86 movie theaters and carried out about 190 stage greetings.

=== Premiere and theatrical release ===
Attack on the Pin-Up Boys held its premiere on the evening of 16 July 2007 at Sinchon Megabox in Seoul, South Korea. The event was held for media person and general public, and was attended by about a hundred journalist and fans. The film also received an invitation from the 2007 Bucheon International Fantastic Film Festival and was screened there on 20 July 2007, ahead of its theatrical release. It was released theatrically in South Korea on 26 July 2007, alongside May 18, Evan Almighty and The Hitcher. It was rated for 12 years old and above on its release. The film was aired in a small scale, only airing on a total of 95 screens in South Korea, compared to May 18, which was aired on 551 screens.

In 2013, six years after the film's release, it received an invitation for a screening at the 6th KT&G Sangsangmadang Cinema Music Film Festival in idol category.

=== Home media ===
The film was released on DVD format on 20 September 2007. It features bonus clips; the making-of documentaries and the film's soundtrack, "Wonder Boy" music video. It also came with posters and photocards of the actors, with their autographs written on the back of the cards. Subtitles in both Korean and English are provided in the home release.

== Reception ==
=== Box office and home release ===
Attack on the Pin-Up Boys grossed a total of US$631,034 in South Korea. It did better than expected in box office sales on its premiere week. The pre-sales of the online tickets surpassed expectation and reached 41.19% purchase rate, thus taking the first place in ticket pre-sales of its opening weekend. Despite the unexpected success in the box office of the film's premiere week, the film has failed to attract no more than 102,600 viewers at the end of August 2007. Throughout the rest of its screening, the film failed to attract more viewers, only recording a total of 110,905 nationwide admittance, thus resulting the film to become a big loss for SM Pictures. SM Pictures were later closed without any success. However, the film's home media released in DVD format became a best seller and was sold-out in both Korea and oversea markets, selling 14,000 units as of March 2008.

=== Critical response ===
The film received mixed reviews from critics. Kukmin Ilbo, a South Korean newspaper said that despite the film being directed by a new director and cast new actors, it praised the film's simple plot, commenting it as light-hearted. The newspaper also praised the casts' performance, saying it was "flawless". However, Kukmin Ilbo also criticised the amount of swear words used in the film, and stated that it might not be enjoyable to be watched by everyone. Ilgan Sports praised the performance of Kim Ryeo-wook as a new actor. The newspaper also said that the manhwa-like characters and experimental production brought the film to life but it has an awkward ending, saying "The intention was to point out the evils of the internet, but it was too hard to relate".

Edaily, a Korean news website, concluded that the film is "fun" and praised the good actings of the cast. The website further said that the film highlighted the reality in Korean educational institution where only students who excel in their study were recognised but students who excel in other co-curricular activities were sidelined.

== Accolades ==
Korea Movie Star Awards
Year	Category	Recipient	Result
2007
2007	Best Production	Attack on the Pin-Up Boys	Nominated
2007	Best Director	Lee Kwon	Nominated
2007	Best Actor	Kangin	Nominated
2007	Best Supporting Actor	Ryeowook	Nominated
2007	Best New Actor	Kangin	Nominated
2007	Best Action Performance	Kangin	Nominated
2007	Best Comedic Performance	Ryeowook	Nominated
