= Oh Gi-gwang =

South Korean actor (born 1995)

- Born: October 26, 1995 (age 30); South Korea
- Other name: Yoon Jong-bin
- Occupation: Actor
- Years active: 2019–present
- Agent: AIMC
- Height: 1.86 m (6 ft 1 in)
- Website: aimc.kr

Oh Gi-gwang (Korean: 오기광; born October 26, 1995), known by his stage name Yoon Jong-bin (윤종빈) is a South Korean actor. He made his debut in 2019 in the SBS series Haechi. He is best known for his role as Jo Jang-soo in TVING's original series Duty After School (2023).

== Career ==
In 2020, Oh signed an exclusive contract with Artist Company.

In 2023, Oh signed an exclusive contract with AIMC.

In 2025, Oh began using his real name for his acting activities, having previously promoted under the stage name Yoon Jong-bin.

== Filmography ==
=== Television series ===
Year	Title	Role	Notes	Ref.
2019	Haechi	Inspector		
2019	Save Me 2	Yoo Hwan-hee		
2019	Extraordinary You	Lee Yang-sam		
2020	Do Do Sol Sol La La Sol	Lee Seung-gi		
2023	O'PENing 2023 – "Summer, Love Machine, Blues"	Ahn Su-chan	One-act drama	
2025	I Dol I	Youngest detective		
2025	Taxi Driver 3		Ep 13–14	

=== Web series ===
Year	Title	Role	Notes	Ref.
2023	Duty After School	Jo Jang-soo		
2025	Weak Hero Class 2	Do Seong-mok		
