= Door Lock (film) =

2018 South Korean film by Lee Kwon

- Theatrical release poster
- Hangul: 도어락
- RR: Doeorak
- MR: Toŏrak
- Directed by: Lee Kwon
- Written by: Lee Kwon; Park Jung-hee
- Produced by: Kim Sung-ryung; Lee Jae-min
- Starring: Gong Hyo-jin; Kim Ye-won; Kim Sung-oh
- Cinematography: Park Jung-hoon
- Production company: Fiona Films
- Distributed by: Megabox Plus M
- Release date: December 5, 2018
- Running time: 102 minutes
- Country: South Korea
- Language: Korean
- Box office: US$11.5 million

Door Lock (Korean: 도어락) is a 2018 South Korean psychological horror-thriller film directed by Lee Kwon. The film stars Gong Hyo-jin, Kim Ye-won and Kim Sung-oh. It was released on December 5, 2018. The movie is based on the 2011 Spanish movie Sleep Tight. While the original tells the story from the perpetrator's perspective, this adaption is from the victims point of view.

== Premise ==
Kyung-min lives alone in a one-room apartment. One day, she found a trace of a stranger breaking into her room and soon a mysterious murder case begins to unravel.

== Cast ==
- Gong Hyo-jin as Cho Kyung-min
- Kim Ye-won as Oh Hyo-joo
- Kim Sung-oh as Detective Lee
- Jo Bok-rae
- Lee Ga-sub as Han Dong-hoon
- Lee Chun-hee
- Lee Hong-nae as a police officer
- Han Ji-eun as Kang Seung-hye

== Production ==
Principal photography began on January 7, 2018, and wrapped on March 14, 2018.
