= Kim Hyun-joon (actor) =

South Korean actor (born 1991)

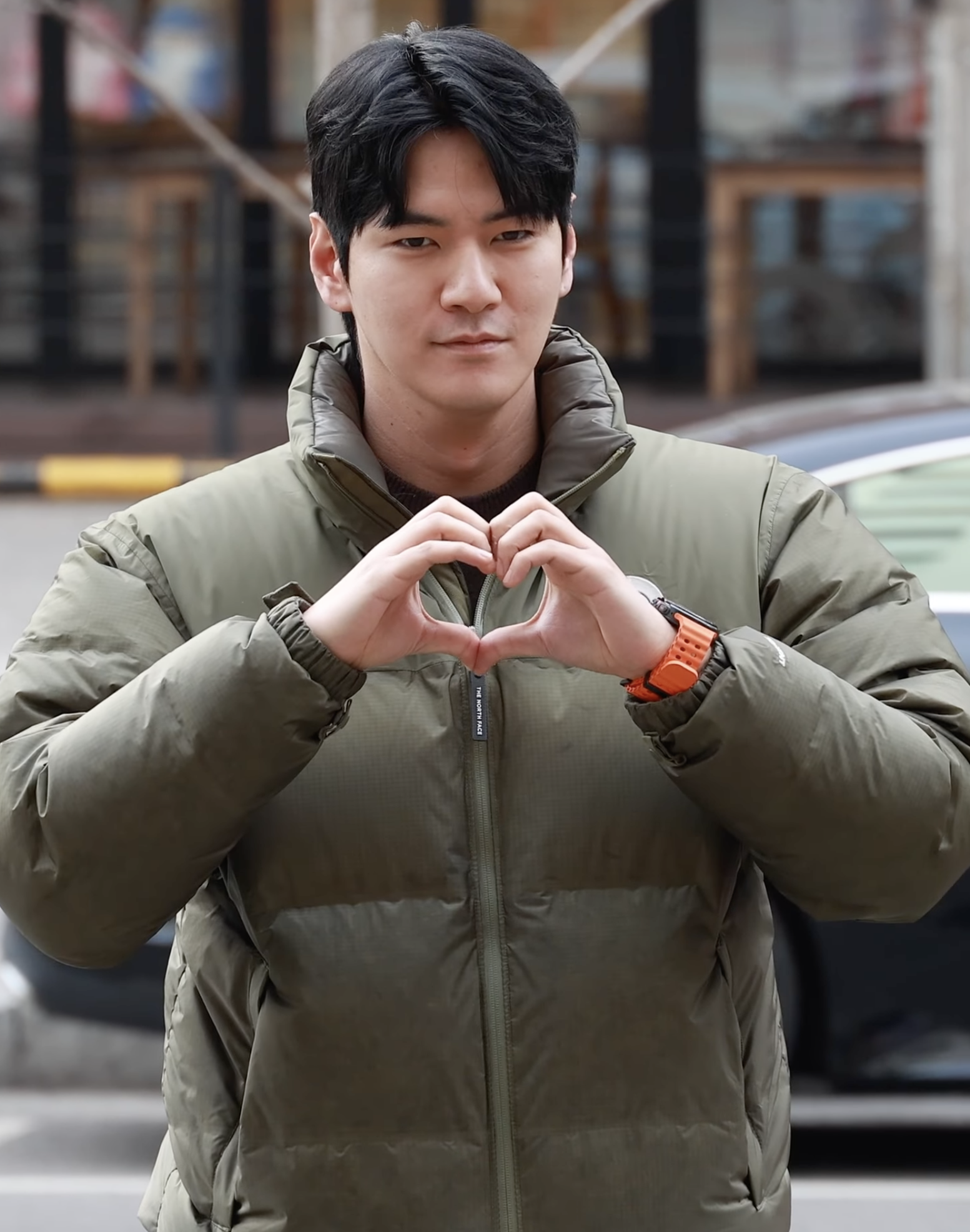
- Kim in January 2025
- Born: Kim Hyun-joon; April 19, 1991 (age 35); Seoul, South Korea
- Other name: Kim Hyun-jun
- Education: Chung-Ang University (Department of Theater and Film)
- Occupations: Actor; model
- Years active: 2006–present
- Agent: Frain Global

Kim Hyun-joon (Korean: 김현준; born April 19, 1991) is a South Korean actor and model. He is known for his roles in dramas such as Hwarang: The Poet Warrior Youth, Black Knight: The Man Who Guards Me, Secret Royal Inspector & Joy, My Sweet Mobster and Iron Family. He also appeared in films including My Son, Han Gong-ju, My Ordinary Love Story and Illang: The Wolf Brigade.

== Filmography ==
=== Television series ===
Year	Title	Role	Ref.
2012	Flower Band	Park Pyo-joo	
2013	Can't Stand Anymore	Hong Bok-gyu	
2014	Into the Flames	Takeda	
2014	KBS Drama Special: The Reason I Get Drunk	Joon-ho	
2014	Plus Nine Boys	Park Jae-bum	
2015	Hogu's Love	Noh Kyung-woo	
2015	This Is My Love	Secretary Kim	
2015	Cheo Yong 2	Oh Chang-won	
2015	Imaginary Cat	Park Jin-sung	
2016	Hwarang: The Poet Warrior Youth	Seok Dan-se	
2017	Black Knight: The Man Who Guards Me	Choi Ji-hoon	
2018	Wok of Love	Kwang Dong-sik	
2018	Dae Jang Geum Is Watching	Han Jeong-sik	
2021	Secret Royal Inspector & Joy	Ji Maeng-soo	
2024	My Sweet Mobster	Lee Gang-gil	
2024	Iron Family	Lee Moo-rim	

=== Film ===
Year	Title	Role	Ref.
2007	My Son	Correction Officer	
2013	Han Gong-ju	Min-ho	
2014	My Ordinary Love Story	Park Eun-gyeol	
2015	Gi Hwa	Gi-hwa	
2018	Duck Town	Yeong-mok	
2018	Illang: The Wolf Brigade	Illang	
2025	Wow Bring It On	Levis	
