= Save Me 2 =

2019 South Korean television series

- Promotional poster
- Also known as: Save Me II
- Hangul: 구해줘 2
- RR: Guhaejwo 2
- MR: Kuhaejwŏ 2
- Genre: Thriller; Mystery
- Created by: Studio Dragon
- Written by: Seo Joo-yeon
- Directed by: Lee Kwon
- Starring: Um Tae-goo; Chun Ho-jin; Esom; Kim Young-min
- Country of origin: South Korea
- Original language: Korean
- No. of episodes: 16

Production
- Producer: Lee Jae-moon
- Camera setup: Single-camera
- Running time: 60 minutes
- Production company: Hidden Sequence

Original release
- Network: OCN
- Release: May 8 – June 27, 2019

Related
- The Fake (2013)

Save Me 2 (Korean: 구해줘 2; RR: Guhaejwo 2) is a 2019 South Korean television series starring Um Tae-goo, Chun Ho-jin, Esom and Kim Young-min. It is the sequel to the 2017 series Save Me and is based on the 2013 animation movie The Fake. The series aired on OCN's Wednesdays and Thursdays at 23:00 KST from May 8 to June 27, 2019.

== Synopsis ==
Set in the rural village of Wolchoori, which is designated as a submerged area due to an upcoming dam construction project, the series centers on the psychological and social turmoil that unfolds among its residents. As anxiety over compensation payments grows, a cunning con man named Choi Kyung-suk (Chun Ho-jin) arrives and poses as a devout church elder, manipulating the naive local pastor, Sung Chul-woo (Kim Young-min). Exploiting the villagers' financial desperation, grief, and vulnerabilities, Kyung-suk gradually leads the community into blind faith, transforming it into a cult.

After being released from prison, Kim Min-chul (Um Tae-goo), a cynical and abrasive ex-convict, returns to his hometown. Recognizing Kyung-suk as a fraud, Min-chul attempts to warn the villagers, including Wolchoori police chief Shin Pil-goo (Jo Jae-yoon), village head Park Duk-ho (Im Ha-ryong), and his estranged younger sister Kim Young-sun (Esom), whom Kyung-suk seeks to sexually exploit, but his criminal past and their unwavering devotion to the false leaders lead them to reject his warnings. With the help of Go Eun-ah (Han Sun-hwa), his former girlfriend who still has feelings for him, and his younger acquaintances, Jung Su-dal (Baek Su-jang) and Yoo Hwan-hee (Yoon Jong-bin), Min-chul wages a relentless fight against the pseudo-religious group to expose the truth and save the village.

== Cast ==
=== Main ===
- Um Tae-goo as Kim Min-chul
- Chun Ho-jin as Choi Kyung-suk
- Esom as Kim Young-sun
- Kim Young-min as Sung Chul-woo

=== Supporting ===
- Jo Jae-yoon as Shin Pil-goo
- Han Sun-hwa as Go Eun-ah
- Im Ha-ryong as Park Duk-ho
- Sung Hyuk as Jung Byung-ryul
- Woo Hyun as Boongeo
- Oh Yeon-ah as Jin-sook
- Jang Won-young as Chil-sung
- Baek Su-jang as Jung Su-dal
- Kim Soo-jin as Chil-sung's wife
- Jeon Ji-hoo as Choi Ji Woong
- Seo Woo-jin as Seo-joon
- Yoon Jong-bin as Yoo Hwan-hee

== Production ==
The first script reading took place in February 2019 in Sangam, Seoul, South Korea.

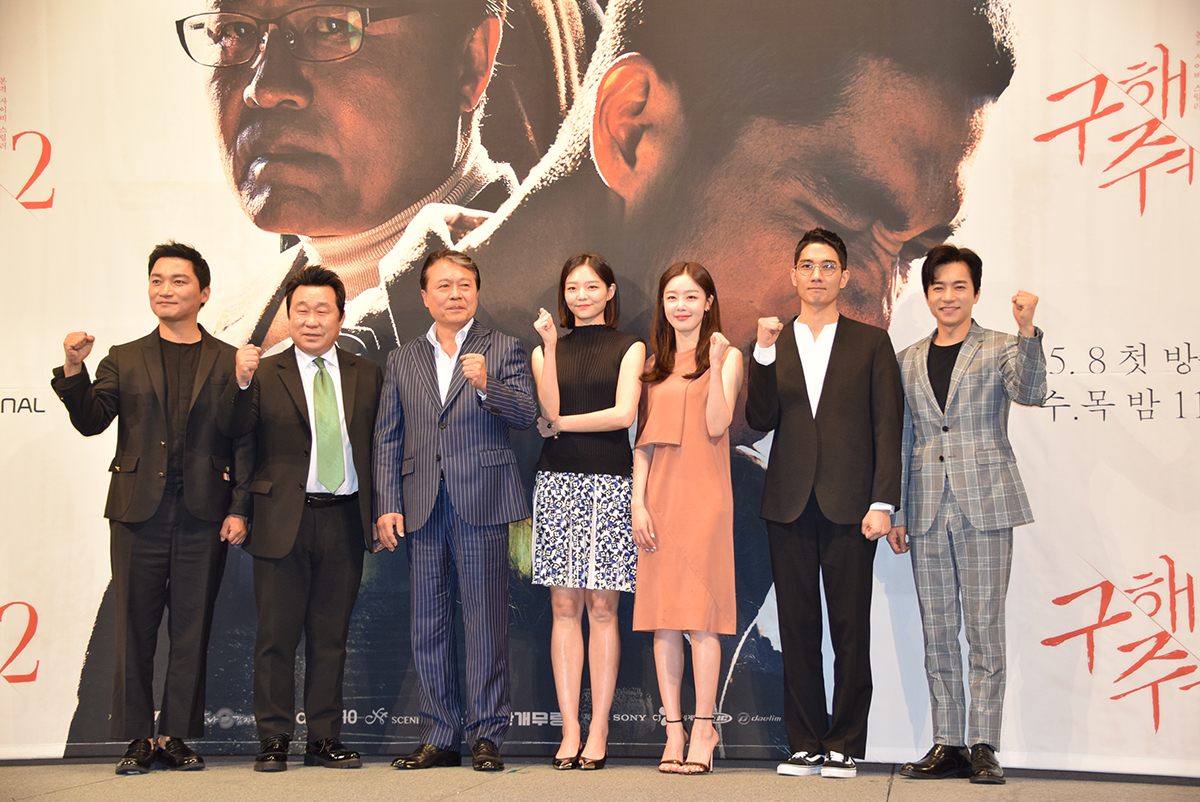
The cast at the press conference on April 30, 2019. From left to right: Jo Jae-yoon, Im Ha-ryong, Chun Ho-jin, Esom, Han Sun-hwa, Um Tae-goo, and Kim Young-min.

The press conference for the series was held on April 30, 2019, at the Imperial Palace Hotel in Seoul, attended by director Lee Kwon and the principal cast ahead of the series' premiere.

== Ratings ==
Save Me 2 : South Korea viewers per episode (thousands)

Season	Episode number																Average
Season	1	2	3	4	5	6	7	8	9	10	11	12	13	14	15	16	Average
1	374	402	338	474	405	381	433	446	458	469	502	570	639	691	695	803	505

Source: Audience measurement performed nationwide by Nielsen Media Research.

Average TV viewership ratings
Ep.	Original broadcast date	Average audience share	
Ep.	Original broadcast date	AGB Nielsen	
Ep.	Original broadcast date	Nationwide	Seoul
1	May 8, 2019	1.414%	1.924%
2	May 9, 2019	1.395%	1.804%
3	May 15, 2019	1.332%	1.763%
4	May 16, 2019	1.932%	2.274%
5	May 22, 2019	1.672%	2.023%
6	May 23, 2019	1.647%	2.009%
7	May 29, 2019	1.738%	2.122%
8	May 30, 2019	1.934%	2.330%
9	June 5, 2019	2.243%	2.621%
10	June 6, 2019	1.967%	2.306%
11	June 12, 2019	2.234%	2.718%
12	June 13, 2019	2.586%	2.916%
13	June 19, 2019	2.704%	3.274%
14	June 20, 2019	2.881%	3.238%
15	June 26, 2019	2.978%	3.370%
16	June 27, 2019	3.560%	4.043%
Average		2.139%	2.546%
In the table above, the blue numbers represent the lowest ratings and the red numbers represent the highest ratings.; This drama aired on a cable channel/pay TV which normally has a relatively smaller audience compared to free-to-air TV/public broadcasters (KBS, SBS, MBC and EBS).
