= Lee Kwon =

South Korean film and TV director (born 1974)

- Born: 25 February 1974 (age 52); South Korea
- Occupations: Film director, TV director
- Spouse: Lee Eon-hee

Korean name
- Hangul: 이권
- RR: I Gwon
- MR: I Kwŏn

Lee Kwon (Korean: 이권; born 25 February 1974) is a South Korean film and TV director.

== Filmography ==
=== As film director ===
- Cowardly Vicious (short film, 2002)
- Attack on the Pin-Up Boys (2007)
- My Ordinary Love Story (2014)
- Door Lock (2018)

=== As screenwriter ===
- My Ordinary Love Story (2014)
- Timing (animated film, 2015)
- Door Lock (2018)

=== As TV director ===
- Flower Band (2012)
- Exo Next Door (2015)
- Save Me 2 (2019)

=== As storyboard artist ===
- Memento Mori (1999) - directing dept
- Take Care of My Cat (2001) - trailer
- Surprise Party (2002)
- Attack on the Pin-Up Boys (2007)

=== Music video ===
- Interview (2000)

=== Title design ===
- Love Exposure (2007)
