= The Elegant Empire =

2023–2024 South Korean television series

- Promotional poster
- Hangul: 우아한 제국
- RR: Uahan jeguk
- MR: Uahan cheguk
- Written by: Han Jeong-mi
- Directed by: Park Ki-ho
- Music by: Son Da-won; Yu-bi
- Country of origin: South Korea
- Original language: Korean
- No. of episodes: 105

Production
- Running time: 35 minutes
- Production companies: UBICULTURE; May Queen Pictures

Original release
- Network: KBS2
- Release: August 7, 2023 – January 19, 2024

The Elegant Empire (Korean: 우아한 제국) is a South Korean television series starring by Han Ji-wan, Lee Si-kang, Kang Yul, Son Seong-yoon, Kim Jin-woo and Lee Sang-bo. It aired on KBS2 from August 7, 2023, to January 19, 2024, every Monday to Friday at 19:50 (KST).

== Synopsis ==
The Elegant Empire is the story of a man and a woman seeking justice against overwhelming power, unearthing hidden truths in their desperate quest for revenge and the recovery of their lost lives.

== Cast ==
=== Main ===
- Kim Jin-woo (ep. 1-32)→ Lee Si-kang (ep. 33–105) as Jang Ki-yoon
- Han Ji-wan as Shin Joo-kyung/Seo Hee-jae
- Kang Yul as Jung Woo-hyeok
- Son Seong-yoon as Jacqueline Taylor/Choi Min-ha
- Lee Sang-bo as Na Seung-pil

=== Supporting ===
- Nam Kyung-eup as Jang Chang-seong: Founder of Elegant Empire Entertainment. Ki-yoon's stepfather.
- Kim Seo-ra as Hong Hye-rim: Chang-seong's wife and Ki-yoon's mother.
- Yoon Chae-na as Jang Su-ah: The daughter of Ju-kyung and Ki-yoon.
- Kim Mi-ra as Jung Joon-Hee: Woo-hyeok's mother.
- Kang Seong-hoon as Jeong Su-ho: Woo-hyeok's uncle.
- Lee Mi-young as Woo Yeong-ran: Hee-chan's wife and Seong-il's ex-wife.
- Kim Sol-bi as Yang Bit-na: The daughter of Yeong-ran and Hee-chan, also a dancer.

== Original soundtrack ==
=== Part 1 ===
Released on September 1, 2023
No.	Title	Artist	Length
1.	"Blossom"	Rovn	2:03
2.	"Blossom" (Inst.)		2:03
Total length:			4:06

=== Part 2 ===
Released on September 25, 2023
No.	Title	Artist	Length
1.	"Poor Love"	Leein	4:03
2.	"Poor Love" (Inst.)		4:03
Total length:			8:06

=== Part 3 ===
Released on September 25, 2023
No.	Title	Artist	Length
1.	"Elegance"	Lee Da-young	3:07
2.	"Elegance" (Inst.)		3:07
Total length:			6:15

=== Part 4 ===
Released on November 1, 2023
No.	Title	Artist	Length
1.	"Just think of you"	Raminu	4:03
2.	"Just think of you" (Inst.)		4:03
Total length:			6:50

=== Part 5 ===
Released on December 7, 2023
No.	Title	Artist	Length
1.	"One Person"	Mean	3:57
2.	"One Person" (Inst.)		3:57
Total length:			7:14

=== Part 6 ===
Released on December 19, 2023
No.	Title	Artist	Length
1.	"That love"	Leein	4:02
2.	"That love" (Inst.)		4:02
Total length:			8:04

=== Part 7 ===
Released on December 25, 2023
No.	Title	Artist	Length
1.	"Snowflake"	Kim Mul-gyeol	4:00
2.	"Snowflake" (Inst.)		4:00
Total length:			8:00

=== Part 8 ===
Released on December 25, 2023
No.	Title	Artist	Length
1.	"My Love"	Leein	4:23
2.	"My Love" (Inst.)		4:23
Total length:			8:46
