= Rugal =

Rugal may refer to:

- Rugal folds, ridges produced by folding of the wall of an organ
- Rugal Bernstein, a video game character created by SNK
- Rugal (TV series), a 2020 South Korean television series
- Rugal, a fictional character from the short film "The Bandits of Golak" in the second season of the 2021 animated anthology Star Wars: Visions
