= About Family =

2024 South Korean film by Yang Woo-suk

- Theatrical release poster
- Hangul: 대가족
- Hanja: 大家族
- Lit.: Big Family
- RR: Daegajok
- MR: Taegajok
- Directed by: Yang Woo-suk
- Written by: Yang Woo-suk
- Produced by: Yang Woo-suk
- Starring: Kim Yoon-seok; Lee Seung-gi; Kim Sung-ryung; Kang Han-na; Park Soo-young; Kim Si-woo; Yoon Chae-na
- Cinematography: Son Won-ho
- Edited by: Kim Sun-min
- Music by: Kim Tae-seong
- Production company: Studio Genius
- Distributed by: Lotte Entertainment
- Release date: December 11, 2024
- Running time: 107 minutes
- Country: South Korea
- Language: Korean
- Box office: US$2.1 million

About Family (Korean: 대가족) is a 2024 South Korean comedy-drama film written and directed by Yang Woo-suk, starring Kim Yoon-seok, Lee Seung-gi, Kim Sung-ryung, Kang Han-na, Park Soo-young, Kim Si-woo, and Yoon Chae-na. The film follows the owner of a dumpling restaurant whose life takes an unexpected turn when two children claiming to be his grandchildren appear, despite his estranged son having become a Buddhist monk. It was released theatrically on December 11, 2024.

== Plot ==
Mu-ok, the owner of Pyeongmanok, a dumpling restaurant renowned for its food since before the advent of social media, worries that his family line will end with him, as his only son, Mun-seok, became a Buddhist monk instead of continuing the family business. One day, however, two young siblings arrive at the restaurant, claiming that Mun-seok is their biological father. Overjoyed at the prospect of having grandchildren to carry on the family line, Mu-ok showers the children, Min-guk and Min-seon, with affection.

Before becoming a monk, Mun-seok had agreed to donate sperm on several occasions to maintain his relationship with his girlfriend, Ga-yeon, at the request of her father, Director Han. The donations resulted in the births of Min-guk and Min-seon, who were subsequently raised by adoptive parents. After both parents die in a car accident, the children's uncle, their only remaining relative, refuses to raise them because they are not biologically related to him. He places them in an orphanage and arranges for their adoption in Denmark. Unwilling to be separated from his younger sister, Min-guk visits the hospital where he was born and discovers Mun-seok's identity. Meanwhile, Mu-ok grows close to the children, who come to regard him as their grandfather. However, he must establish their biological relationship to obtain custody of them.

As Mu-ok spends more time with the siblings, he makes various efforts to bond with them, including attempting to dye his partly white, partly black hair entirely black, only to end up with red hair. He also takes them on an outing to Lotte World with the nuns and other children from their orphanage. Hoping to establish their biological relationship, Mu-ok secretly collects hair samples from Min-guk and Min-seon and submits them for DNA testing. He is devastated when the testing agency informs him that Min-guk is not Mun-seok's biological son. It is revealed that Mun-seok had arranged for a Chinese restaurant delivery worker to donate sperm in his place approximately ten times, resulting in the children being conceived using another man's sperm despite being registered as Mun-seok's biological offspring.

Fearing that he and his sister will be sent abroad for adoption if the truth comes to light, Min-guk flees into the mountains with Min-seon. Mu-ok eventually decides to adopt the siblings regardless of their biological ties to his family, recognizing the bond they have formed. With Mun-seok coming to understand his father's true feelings, the two help rescue the children.

Decades later, Mun-seok, now an elderly monk, attends a memorial service for Mu-ok alongside the grown-up Min-guk and Min-seon and their families. The gathering also includes the families of the sixteen children whom Mu-ok adopted over the years, including Mun-seok's biological children.

== Cast ==
- Kim Yoon-seok as Ham Mu-ok
- Lee Seung-gi as Ham Mun-seok
- Kim Sung-ryung as Bang Jeong-hwa
- Kang Han-na as Han Ga-yeon
- Park Soo-young as Venerable Inhaeng
- Kim Si-woo as Hong Min-guk
- Yoon Chae-na as Hong Min-seon
- Shim Hee-sub as Moon-seok's friend
- Lee Soon-jae as The Great Monk
- Seo Bum-june as Kyung-rae
- Gil Hae-yeon as Mother superior
- Lee Joong-hyun as Grandfather
- Lee Song-kyung as Nurse
- Lee Jae-yong as Venerable Jeokjeong
- Choi Moo-sung as Director Han

== Production ==
=== Casting ===
O Yeong-su, best known internationally for his role in Squid Game, was originally cast as the head monk and had completed filming all of his scenes. However, following his indictment in November 2022 on charges of sexual misconduct and subsequent conviction, the production company announced that his role would be recast. The decision led to a complete re-shoot of his scenes with actor Lee Soon-jae.

=== Filming ===
Principal photography started in October 2022 and concluded in January 2023, with filming taking place at the Buddhist Broadcasting System studio in Mapo District.

== Release ==
About Family premiered in South Korean theaters on 11 December 2024, distributed by Lotte Entertainment.

=== Box office ===
The film was released on December 11, 2024 on 939 screens. It opened in third place at the South Korean box office with 35,078 admissions.

As of April 5, 2025, the film has grossed US$1.9 million from 339,772 admissions.
