= Song Yoo-hyun =

South Korean actress (born 1983)

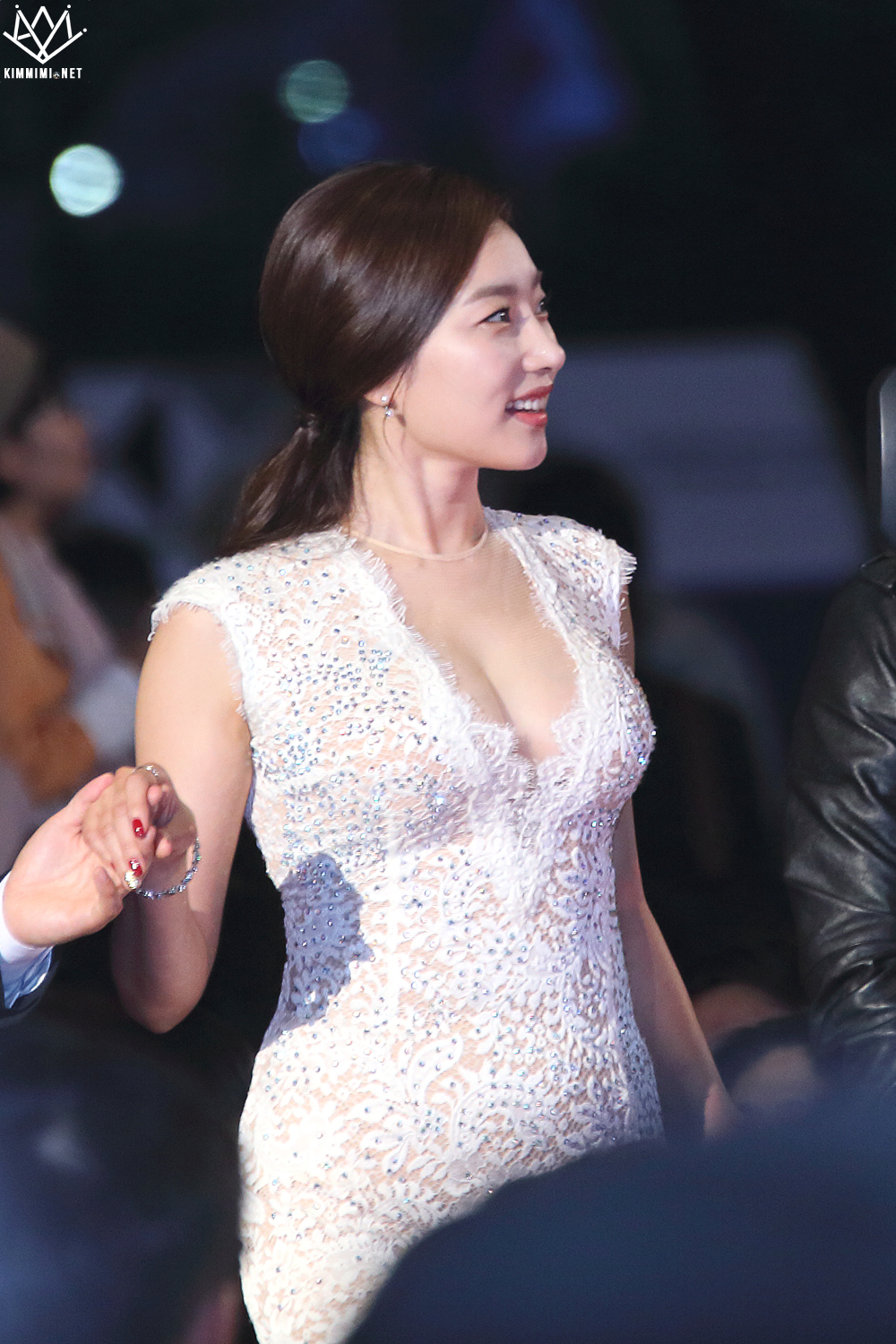
- Song in 2015
- Born: 8 January 1983 (age 43)
- Other name: Song Yoo-hyeon
- Education: Korea National University of Arts – Bachelor of Arts in Acting
- Occupations: Actress; theater actor
- Years active: 2001–present
- Agent: WS Entertainment

Korean name
- Hangul: 송유현
- RR: Song Yuhyeon
- MR: Song Yuhyŏn

Song Yoo-hyun (Korean: 송유현; born Song Jin-young on 8 January 1983) is a South Korean actress. She is an alumna of Korea National University of Arts, Department of Acting. She made her acting debut in 2001; since then, she has appeared in a number of films and television series. She is known for her role as Han Go-eun, a cynical boss in Hell Is Other People (2019), and 18 Again (2020). She has acted in films such as Mate (2019) and Midnight (2021). She also appeared in TV series such as Born Again (2020) and Now, We Are Breaking Up (2021).

== Career ==
Song Yoo-hyun has a Bachelor of Arts in Acting from Korea National University of Arts. She made her theater debut in the play The Shape in 2008. She appeared in films such as Confession (2014) and Alone (2015). Her TV series appearances include Signal (2016), The Good Wife (2016), Mother (2018), Confession (2019), Designated Survivor: 60 Days (2019), and Welcome 2 Life (2019). She is affiliated to WS Entertainment since October 2019.

In 2020, Song appeared in 18 Again and Born Again. In 2021, she appeared in the SBS TV series Now, We Are Breaking Up as Oh In-ah.

== Filmography ==
=== Films ===
| Year | Title | Role | Notes | Ref. |
|---|---|---|---|---|
| 2013 | Kisses | Jessica | | |
| 2014 | Confession | Waiting room girl 2 | | |
| 2016 | Alone | Ji-yeon | | |
| 2019 | Mate | Ji-seon | | |
| 2020 | Secret Zoo | Overseas Korean woman | | |
| 2020 | Deliver Us from Evil | Korean married couple wife | | |
| 2021 | Plus Nine Romance | Entertainment company representative | Cameo | |
| 2021 | Midnight | Section chief | | |
| 2024 | Handsome Guys | Nun | | |

=== Television series ===
| Year | Title | Role | Notes | Ref. |
|---|---|---|---|---|
| 2009 | My Too Perfect Sons | Nurse | | |
| 2011 | Paradise Ranch | Yoo Song-yi | | |
| 2013 | She Is Wow | | | |
| 2014 | Emergency Couple | | | |
| 2016 | The Good Wife | | | |
| 2016 | Signal | Kang Se-yeong | | |
| 2016 | On the Way to the Airport | Choi Kyung-sook | | |
| 2017 | School 2017 | College Academic Counselor | | |
| 2017–18 | Love Returns | Goo Jong-hee | | |
| 2018 | Mother | Song Ye-eun | | |
| 2019 | Designated Survivor: 60 Days | Kim Eun-joo | | |
| 2019 | Welcome 2 Life | Yoo Jin-hee | | |
| 2019 | Confession | Cho Gyeong-seon | | |
| 2019 | Hell Is Other People | Han Go-eun | | |
| 2020 | Born Again | Lim Hwa-young | | |
| 2020 | Team Bulldog: Off-Duty Investigation | Producer Hong | | |
| 2020 | 18 Again | Mi-yeon | | |
| 2021 | Now, We Are Breaking Up | Oh In-ah | | |

=== Theater ===
| Year | Title | Role | Ref. |
|---|---|---|---|
| 2008 | The Shape | Ji-eun | |
| 2008 | Soft Store | Mi-Joon | |
| 2009 | Dear Teacher Elena | Lalya | |
| 2010 | Bookmark | Jaekyung | |
| 2010 | Love Play | Kyoko Izumikawa | |
| 2011 | I Loved Him | Mi-Young | |
| 2012 | Seoul Note | | |
| 2012 | Wedding Scandal | Elsa | |
| 2012 | Heotang | Prisoner 3 | |
| 2013 | Clumsy People | Yoo Hwa-i | |
| 2014 | Three Generations | | |
| 2015 | Chuncheon There | Sejin | |
| 2015 | Hobby Room | Mika | |
| 2016 | Alcohol, Tears and Jekyll and Hyde | Eve Danvers | |
| 2016 | Closer | Anna | |
