= Lee Seo-el =

South Korean actress (born 1991)

- Born: Lee Seo-el; 15 October 1991 (age 35); South Korea
- Other names: Seoel Lee, Lee Seoel
- Occupations: Actress; model
- Years active: 2019–present
- Agent: Onnuri Media Entertainment
- Known for: Rugal; Born Again

Lee Seo-el (Korean: 이서엘; born 15 October 1991) is a South Korean actress and model. She is best known for her roles in dramas such as Rugal and Born Again.

== Career ==
Lee Seo-el is a South Korean model and actress. She was a model then she made her first acting debut in 2020 when she took on her first role in the television drama Rugal which attracted attention to her role as Yeo-jin and in the same year she was cast in drama Born Again as Baek Sang-ah.

== Filmography ==
=== Television series ===
Year	Title	Role	Ref.
2020	Rugal	Yeo-jin	
2020	Born Again	Baek Sang-ah	
2023	A Good Day to Be a Dog	Yoon Chae-ah	
