= Yoon Chae-na =

South Korean child actress (born 2016)

- Born: April 27, 2016 (age 10); South Korea
- Occupation: Actress
- Years active: 2021–present
- Awards: Best Youth Actress Award at the 2022 KBS Drama Awards

Korean name
- Hangul: 윤채나
- RR: Yun Chaena
- MR: Yun Ch'aena

Yoon Chae-na (Korean: 윤채나; born April 27, 2016) is a South Korean child actress. She debuted through television series Love Twist (2021) and is best known for her roles in television series The Love in Your Eyes (2022) and The Elegant Empire (2023).

== Life and career ==
Chae-na was born on April 27, 2016, in Seoul, South Korea. She started acting by participating in KBS's evening daily soap drama Love Twist (2021) and The Love in Your Eyes (2022), for which she was awarded the Best Young Actress in the 2022 KBS Drama Awards for her acting in both dramas.

She also joined the cast of television drama The Elegant Empire (2023) and started her movie debut in film Dog Days (2024).

== Filmography ==
=== Film ===
Year	Title	Role	Ref.
2024	Dog Days	Ji-yu	
2024	About Family	Min-sun	

=== Television series ===
Year	Title	Role	Ref.
2021	Love Twist	Park Saet-byeol / Kim Saet-byeol	
2022	The Love in Your Eyes	Kim Mirinae	
2023	Revenant	A girl crying for doll (episode 2)	
2023	Not Others	Kim Jin-hee (child)	
2023	The Elegant Empire	Jang Soo-a	
2023	Play, Plii	Song Han-joo (young)	
2024	Doctor Slump	Elementary school classmate (episode 7)	
2024	Suji & Uri	Jo Ah-ra	
2024	A Virtuous Business	Han Jeong-suk (child)	
2025	The First Night with the Duke	Jo Eun-ae (child)	

== Awards and nominations ==
Award Ceremony	Year	Category	Nominee(s) / Work(s)	Result	Ref.
KBS Drama Awards	2022	Best Young Actress	Love Twist and The Love in Your Eyes	Won	
