= Mate (2019 film) =

2019 film by Jung Dae-gun

- Directed by: Jung Dae-gun
- Written by: Jung Dae-gun
- Starring: Shim Hee-sub; Jung Hye-sung; Kil Hae-yeon
- Release dates: May 2018 (Jeonju); January 17, 2019
- Running time: 92 minutes
- Country: South Korea
- Language: Korean

Mate (Korean: 메이트) is a South Korean film released on January 17, 2019. The drama/romance film stars Shim Hee-sub, Jung Hye-sung, and Kil Hae-yeon, and it is both directed and written by Jung Dae-gun. Although the film only drew in 1,392 box office admissions during its opening week, it was one of the ten films selected as finalists to participate in the 19th Jeonju International Film Festival 2018.

== Plot ==
Joon-ho (Shim Hee-Sub) first met Eun-ji (Jung Hye-sung) through a dating application and spent a night together. They later had another encounter when Joon-ho applies for a part-time photographing job at a magazine. The two developed feelings for each other, but they remained in an open relationship between friends and lovers. The term "mates" was coined because of their avoidance of commitment in the relationship.

== Cast ==
- Shim Hee-sub as Joon-ho
- Jung Hye-sung as Eun-ji
- Gil Hae-yeon as Geum-hee
- Jeon Shin-hwan-I as Jin-soo
- Yoon So-mi as Da-hee
- Song Yoo-hyun as Ji-seon
- Han Sa-myung as Sang-won
- Heo Jin as Kelly writer
- Park Sae-byeol as Reanimation nurse
- Kim Chang-hwan as Byeong-joo (cameo)
- Kang Sook as Herb shop owner (special appearance)
