= Han Ji-wan =

South Korean actress (born 1987)

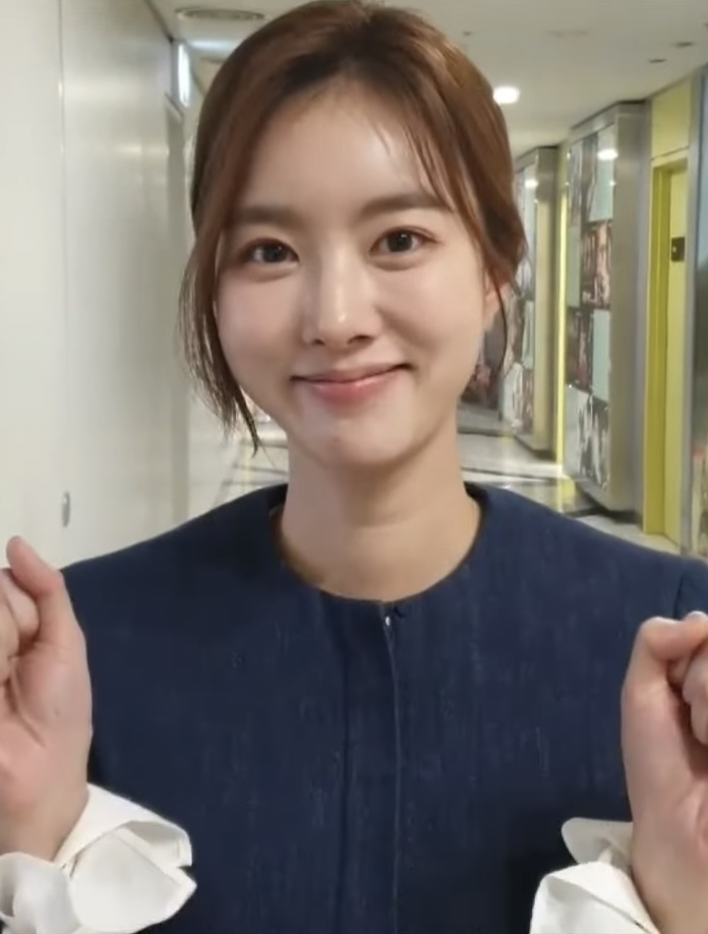
- Han in December 2022
- Born: August 14, 1987 (age 39); Seoul, South Korea
- Education: Chung-Ang University (Department of Theater and Film)
- Occupation: Actress
- Years active: 2010–present
- Agent: Kenneth Company

Korean name
- Hangul: 한지완
- RR: Han Jiwan
- MR: Han Chiwan

Han Ji-wan (Korean: 한지완; born August 14, 1987) is a South Korean actress. She is known for her drama roles in Rugal, Search: WWW and I Do, I Do.

== Early life ==
She was born on August 14, 1987, in Sangam-dong, Mapo District, Seoul, South Korea. She attended Chung-Ang University to study acting and theater. After completing her studies, she signed with Gtree Creative Agency and made her acting debut in 2010 film The Most Beautiful Picnic in The World.

== Career ==
She has appeared in numerous television dramas, including I Do, I Do, Search: WWW and My Unfamiliar Family. She was praised for her role as villainess heiress in drama Rugal as Choi Ye-won. The very same she also appeared in drama Lonely Enough to Love as Choi Kyung-won starring with Kim So-eun, Park Geon-il and Ji Hyun-woo. Recently, she played another villainess heiress in Games of Witches as the arrogant fake Joo Se-young.

== Filmography ==
=== Film ===
Year	Title	Role	Ref.
2010	The Most Beautiful Picnic in The World	Park-soo	

=== Television series ===
Year	Title	Role	Ref.
2011	Cool Guys, Hot Ramen	Joo Ya-soo	
2012	I Do, I Do	Yoo Da-in	
2013	Drama Festival 2013: "Swine Escape"	Wol-hyang	
2015	The Jingbirok: A Memoir of Imjin War	Han Seol-hee	
2017	Smashing on Your Back	Lee Ja-young	
2018	Quiz of God 5: Reboot	Hong Na-yeo	
2019	Search: WWW	Jung Da-in	
2020	Rugal	Choi Ye-won	
2020	My Unfamiliar Family	Hye-soo	
2020	Love is Annoying, but I Hate Being Lonely!	Choi Kyung-won	
2021	Revolutionary Sisters	Min Deul-re	
2021	Chimera	Ryu Sung-hee	
2022	Three Bold Siblings	The person who threw an egg at Tae-joo	
2022	Game of Witches	Joo Se-yeong	
2023	Brain Works	Han Yeon-hee	
2023	The Elegant Empire	Seo Hee-jae	

== Awards and nominations ==
Name of the award ceremony, year presented, category, nominee of the award, and the result of the nomination
Award ceremony	Year	Category	Nominee / Work	Result	Ref.
KBS Drama Awards	2023	Excellence Award, Actress in a Daily Drama	Elegant Empire	Nominated	
