= Born Again (TV series) =

2020 South Korean television series

- Promotional poster
- Hangul: 본 어게인
- RR: Bon eogein
- MR: Pon ŏgein
- Genre: Mystery; Melodrama
- Created by: KBS Drama Production
- Written by: Jung Soo-mi
- Directed by: Jin Hyung-wook
- Starring: Jang Ki-yong; Jin Se-yeon; Lee Soo-hyuk
- Music by: Gaemi
- Country of origin: South Korea
- Original language: Korean
- No. of episodes: 32 (Note: In order to circumvent Korean laws that prevent commercial breaks in the middle of an episode, what would previously have been aired as single 70 minute episodes are now being repackaged as two 35 minute episodes, with two episodes being shown each night with a commercial break between the two.)

Production
- Executive producer: Kim Sang-hwi (KBS)
- Producers: Dog Nam goong Jeong Hae-ryong
- Camera setup: Single-camera
- Running time: 35 minutes
- Production companies: UFO Production; Monster Union

Original release
- Network: KBS2
- Release: April 20 – June 9, 2020

Born Again (Korean: 본 어게인; RR: Bon eogein) is a 2020 South Korean television series starring Jang Ki-yong, Jin Se-yeon, and Lee Soo-hyuk. It tells the story of two men and one woman who become involved in the 1980s and again in the present day through reincarnation and fate. The series aired on KBS2 from April 20 to June 9, 2020 on Mondays and Tuesdays at 22:00 (KST).

== Synopsis ==
Born Again tells the story of three reincarnated souls that have been intertwined together by fate.

In the 1980s, Gong Ji-chul (Jang Ki-yong) was a lone wolf who defied his evil father. He is an elite medical student in the present.

In the 1980s, Jung Ha-eun (Jin Se-yeon) was the owner of a used bookstore called "Old Future". Unfortunately, she was suffering from congenital cardiomyopathy and could die at any moment. In the present, she is a forensic medical examiner working in the NFS, who uncovers the skeletal remains of the nameless, and restores their stories to them.

In the 1980s, Cha Hyung-bin (Lee Soo-hyuk) was a detective who loved only one person. In the present, he is a prosecutor who believes in a "criminal gene".

The three become involved in a passionate love triangle that endures beyond death and time.

== Cast ==
=== Main ===
- Jang Ki-yong as Gong Ji-chul / Cheon Jong-bum
- Jin Se-yeon as Jung Ha-eun / Jung Sa-bin
- Lee Soo-hyuk as Cha Hyung-bin / Kim Soo-hyuk

=== Supporting ===
==== 1980s ====
- Jung In-gum as Gong In-woo
- Cho Deok-hoo as Cheon Suk-tae
- Wi Ji-yeon as Jang Hye-mi
- Jang Hee-song as Jung Sung-eun

==== Present ====
- Choi Kwang-il as Cheon Suk-tae
- Kim Jung-young as Heo Jin-kyung
- Park Sang-hoon as Cheon Jong-woo
- Kim Jung-nan as Jang Hye-mi
- Lee Seo-el as Baek Sang-ah
- Park Chul-ho as Jung Sung-eun
- Lee Myung-ho as bar owner
- Kim Jun-bae as bar chef
- Jang Won-young as Joo In-do
- Kim Min-sun as Goo Joo-hye
- Kim Joong-don as Gu Hyul-ki
- Han Hae-rim as Yoo Seo-young
- Cha Min-ji as Jay
- Choi Dae-chul as Seo Tae-ha
- Kim Do-kyung as Jang Ma-chul
- Park Young-soo as Chang-soon

Special appearance

- Song Yoo-hyun as Lim Hwa-young

== Original soundtrack ==
Part	Artist	Title	Release date
Part 1	Kim Yong-jin	못다핀 꽃 한송이	April 27, 2020
Part 2	Sondia	꿈에	May 4, 2020
Part 3	JeA	보고 싶은 그대니까요	May 11, 2020
Part 4	길구봉구	내게 올 수 없는 너	May 18, 2020
Part 5	Lee Chan-sol	Fate	May 25, 2020
Part 6	Kim Bo-hyung	별과 달처럼	June 1, 2020
Special album	Various artists	Special album	June 8, 2020

== Viewership ==
In this table, the blue numbers represent the lowest ratings and the red numbers represent the highest ratings.

Ep.	Original broadcast date	Average audience share
Ep.	Original broadcast date	Nielsen Korea
Ep.	Original broadcast date	Nationwide
1	April 20, 2020	3.7%
2	April 20, 2020	4.1%
3	April 21, 2020	2.4%
4	April 21, 2020	2.8%
5	April 27, 2020	2.8%
6	April 27, 2020	3.5%
7	April 28, 2020	3.0%
8	April 28, 2020	3.0%
9	May 4, 2020	2.3%
10	May 4, 2020	3.3%
11	May 5, 2020	2.4%
12	May 5, 2020	2.9%
13	May 11, 2020	2.0%
14	May 11, 2020	2.3%
15	May 12, 2020	1.7%
16	May 12, 2020	2.3%
17	May 18, 2020	2.4%
18	May 18, 2020	2.9%
19	May 19, 2020	1.5%
20	May 19, 2020	2.0%
21	May 25, 2020	1.3%
22	May 25, 2020	2.9%
23	May 26, 2020	1.3%
24	May 26, 2020	1.6%
25	June 1, 2020	1.4%
26	June 1, 2020	2.3%
27	June 2, 2020	1.5%
28	June 2, 2020	2.1%
29	June 8, 2020	2.2%
30	June 8, 2020	2.4%
31	June 9, 2020	1.7%
32	June 9, 2020	2.4%
Average		2.3%
