= The Wrath =

2018 film directed by Yoo Young-sun

- Theatrical release poster
- Hangul: 여곡성
- Hanja: 女哭聲
- RR: Yeogokseong
- MR: Yŏgoksŏng
- Directed by: Yoo Young-sun
- Written by: Park Jae-beom; Yoo Young-sun
- Produced by: Choi Moon-seok
- Starring: Seo Young-hee; Son Na-eun
- Cinematography: Kwak Sang-hoon
- Edited by: Jung Jin-hee
- Distributed by: Smile Entertainment
- Release date: November 8, 2018
- Running time: 94 minutes
- Country: South Korea
- Language: Korean
- Box office: US$470,685

The Wrath (Korean: 여곡성) is a 2018 South Korean horror mystery film directed by Yoo Young-sun, starring Seo Young-hee and Son Na-eun. It is a remake of the 1986 Korean horror film Woman's Wail. The film was released on November 8, 2018.

== Premise ==
Set during the Joseon Era, the story follows two Joseon women against each other when a tragedy befalls a family of three sons who all die on their wedding day.

== Cast ==
- Seo Young-hee as Lady Shin
- Son Na-eun as Ok-bun
- Park Min-ji as Wol-ah
- Lee Tae-ri
- Son Seong-yoon as Kyung-ran
- Park Min-jung as Mrs. Han
- Lee Kyu-sung as Buddhish Monk
- Lee Jae-ah as Young-sook
- Choi Hong-il
- Kim Hee-sang

== Production ==
Principal photography began on December 20, 2017, and wrapped up in early 2018. Actress Park Jin-hee was first offered to play lead female role Lady Shin, but declined later.

== Release ==
The film has been sold to 20 countries as of October 30, 2018.

- Singapore: December 6, 2018
- Vietnam: January 25, 2019
- Thailand: November 29, 2018
