= Love Twist =

2021 South Korean television daily drama

- Promotional poster
- Also known as: Twists of Love
- Hangul: 사랑의 꽈배기
- Lit.: Twisted Doughnut of Love
- RR: Sarangui kkwabaegi
- MR: Sarangŭi kkwabaegi
- Genre: Melodrama; Family drama
- Created by: Kim Sang-hwi; Ki Min-soo; KBS Drama Division
- Written by: Lee Eun-joo
- Directed by: Kim Won-yong
- Starring: Hahm Eun-jung; Kim Jin-yeop; Son Seong-yoon
- Music by: Lee Chang-hee
- Country of origin: South Korea
- Original language: Korean
- No. of episodes: 103

Production
- Executive producer: Park Ki-ho (KBS)
- Camera setup: Single-camera
- Running time: 40 minutes
- Production companies: Neo Entertainment Co., Ltd.

Original release
- Network: KBS2
- Release: December 13, 2021 – May 20, 2022

Love Twist (Korean: 사랑의 꽈배기; RR: Sarangui kkwabaegi) is a South Korean television series starring Hahm Eun-jung, Kim Jin-yeop and Son Seong-yoon. The series, directed by Kim Won-yong and written by Lee Eun-joo, tells the story of a family whose love and life are totally twisted because of a lie. The daily drama premiered on KBS2 on December 13, 2021 and aired every weekday at 19:50 (KST) till May 20, 2022.

== Synopsis ==
Love Twist is a story of three families, giving insight into the meaning of family and love.

== Cast and characters ==
=== Main ===
- Hahm Eun-jung as Oh So-ri, the CEO of the online shopping mall 'Kkwabaegi'
- Kim Jin-yeop as Park Ha-ru, a warm and friendly tsundere style
- Hwang Shin-hye as Park Hee-ok, the best friend of Maeng Ok-hee
- Yoon Da-hoon as Oh Gwang-nam, 39-year-old, Ok-hee's husband, CEO of Dongbang Group
- Shim Hye-jin as Maeng Ok-hee, 35 years old, Oh Gwang-nam's wife
- Son Seong-yoon as Kang Yoon-ah, a high school classmate of So-ri and a persistent love affair with Park Ha-ru
- Yoon Chae-na as Saet-byeol, daughter of Ha-ru and Yoon-ah.
- Jang Se-hyeon as Jo Kyung-joon, a man who is jobless

=== Supporting ===
- Park Hye-jin as Kim Soon-bun, Oh Gwang-nam's mother and So-ri's grandmother
- Yoo Tae-woong as Jang Dong-man, husband of Mi-ja and longtime friend of Gwang-nam.
- Oh Young-shil as Hwang Mi-ja, Kyung-joon's mother
- Kim Ju-ri as Shin Do-hee, she was working as a nursing assistant in the VIP ward of a university hospital
- Lee Su-yong as Kim Chul-gu, Ha-ru's high school senior
- Lee Dal-hyung as Gangnam Chun, Yoona's father, farmer
- Park Chul-ho as Park Ki-tae, an ex-convict for fraud, violence, theft, and rape
- Kim Sung-kyum
- Nam Kyung-eup
- Na Young-hee
- Yoon In-jo

== Production ==
Director Kin Won-yong and writer Lee Eun-joo are working together in their 6th series. They worked in dramas: The Return of Simcheon, KBS2 TV 2009 morning daily drama I'll Give You Everything, KBS2 2013 series Samsaengi, KBS1 TV 2014 daily drama My Dear Cat, and KBS2 TV 2019 daily drama A Place in the Sun. On September 29, Hahm Eun-jung's agency, Management Gu, informed that she has received offer to appear in the series. Shim Hye-jin is appearing in a KBS drama after a hiatus of 3 years, she last appeared in the KBS1 TV daily series Sunny Again Tomorrow. Son Seong-yoon confirmed to join the cast of series in October. Script reading site was revealed on November 11, with release of photos.

== Release ==
The series was released on December 13, 2021 on KBS2.

== Original soundtrack ==
Love Twist

Soundtrack album by Various
- Released: 2021
- Genre: Soundtrack
- Languages: Korean; English
- Labels: Warner Music; Coca

=== Part 1 ===
Released on December 13, 2021
No.	Title	Lyrics	Music	Artist	Length
1.	"Leaving You Who I Loved" (사랑했던 너를 떠나고)	Invincible Victory, Sok Sok-hee, ALMOND	Invincible Victory, Sok Sok-hee, Lee Ju-yong	Hong Joo-hyun	3:36
2.	"Leaving You Who I Loved" (inst.)				3:36

=== Part 2 ===
Released on December 21, 2021
No.	Title	Lyrics	Music	Artist	Length
1.	"Pretzel of Love" (사랑의 꽈배기)	Palgu Sound, Solshine	Palgu Sound, Solshine	Cho Seung-goo	3:00
2.	"Pretzel of Love" (inst.)				3:00

=== Part 3 ===
Released on December 30, 2021
No.	Title	Lyrics	Music	Artist	Length
1.	"Have You Ever Been in Love"	Seeso	Seeso, BUDI	Seeso	2:58

=== Part 4 ===
Released on January 4, 2022
No.	Title	Lyrics	Music	Artist	Length
1.	"Is It Like My Heart" (내 마음과 같을까)	Absolute Victory, ALMOND	Absolute Victory, Juyong Lee	Sang-hyeon (Mr. Mr.)	3:37
2.	"Is It Like My Heart"		Absolute Victory, Juyong Lee	(Inst.)	3:37

=== Part 5 ===
Released on January 10, 2022
No.	Title	Lyrics	Music	Artist	Length
1.	"Lavender (Please answer)" (라벤더(대답해주세요))	Seeso	Seeso, Pieper Beats	Seeso	4:13

=== Part 6 ===
Released on January 17, 2022
No.	Title	Lyrics	Music	Artist	Length
1.	"Because Love Is So Hard" (사랑이 참 어려워서)	Immortal, Jamie, ALMOND	Immortal, Jamie, Lee Ju-yong	Seo J	3:49
2.	"Because Love Is So Hard" (Inst.)				3:49

=== Part 7 ===
Released on January 24, 2022
No.	Title	Lyrics	Music	Artist	Length
1.	"Don't Know My Heart" (내 맘을 몰라)	Undefeated Defeat, Sok Sok-hee, ALMOND	Undefeated Defeat, Sok Sok-hee, Lee Ju-yong	Naeun Seol	3:14
2.	"Don't Know My Heart" (Inst.)				3:14

=== Part 8 ===
Released on January 31, 2022
No.	Title	Lyrics	Music	Artist	Length
1.	"Shine" (빛나요)	Undefeated, Jamie, ALMOND	Undefeated, Jamie, Lee Ju-yong	Yoon Tae-Hwa	3:57
2.	"Shine" (Inst.)				3:57

=== Part 9 ===
Released on February 7, 2022
No.	Title	Lyrics	Music	Artist	Length
1.	"Only One"	Absolute Victory, Hwang Seong-jin	Absolute Victory, Lee Ju-yong	Rokhyun	3:17
2.	"Only One" (Inst.)				3:17

=== Part 10 ===
Released on February 14, 2022
No.	Title	Lyrics	Music	Artist	Length
1.	"We're in love, but why do we get sick" (사랑을 하는데 우리 왜 아픈가요)	Absolutely Invincible, Lydia	Absolutely Invincible, Juyong Lee	Lydia	3:35
2.	"We're in love, but why do we get sick" (Inst.)				3:35

=== Part 11 ===
Released on February 21, 2022
No.	Title	Artist	Length
1.	"Wonderful Day" (아름다운 날이야)	Dear Ming	3:52
2.	"Wonderful Day" (Inst.)		3:52

=== Part 12 ===
Released on February 28, 2022
No.	Title	Lyrics	Music	Artist	Length
1.	"I only see you" (너만 보여)	Undefeated, Almond	Undefeated	Moon Song-hee	3:20
2.	"I only see you" (Inst.)				3:20

=== Part 13 ===
Released on March 7, 2022
No.	Title	Lyrics	Music	Artist	Length
1.	"I Really Hate You" (내가 참 미워)	Invincible, Sok Sang-hee, Damu	Invincible, Sok Sang-hee, Lee Ju-yong, Damu	Damu	3:11
2.	"I Really Hate You" (Inst.)				3:11

=== Part 14 ===
Released on March 14, 2022
No.	Title	Lyrics	Music	Artist	Length
1.	"It's You" (그대라 그래요)	Hwang Seong-jin, Lee Joo-yong	Undefeated, Lee Joo-yong	Yeo Dong Saeng	3:17
2.	"It's You" (Inst.)				3:17

=== Part 15 ===
Released on March 28, 2022
No.	Title	Lyrics	Music	Artist	Length
1.	"Still You" (아직은 널)	Undefeated, Sok Sok, Almond	Undefeated, Sok Sok, Lee Ju-yong	Morning Coffee	3:41
2.	"Still You" (Inst.)				3:41

=== Part 16 ===
Released on April 4, 2022
No.	Title	Lyrics	Music	Artist	Length
1.	"Bad"	Invincible, Almond	Invincible, LACONIC	Rose (JANG MI)	3:12
2.	"Bad" (Inst.)				3:12

=== Part 17 ===
Released on April 11, 2022
No.	Title	Lyrics	Music	Artist	Length
1.	"The moment we were happy together" (우리 함께 행복했던 순간이)	Undefeated, Jamie	Undefeated, Jamie, Lee Ju-yong	Gabin Han	3:43
2.	"The moment we were happy together" (Inst.)				3:43

=== Part 18 ===
Released on April 18, 2022
No.	Title	Lyrics	Music	Artist	Length
1.	"Let It All Go" (모두 다 놓으리라)	Sok Suk-hee	Sok Suk-hee	Cheon Ga-yeon	3:15
2.	"Let It All Go" (Inst.)				3:15

=== Part 19 ===
Released on April 25, 2022
No.	Title	Music	Artist	Length
1.	"How Much You" (내가 얼마나 널)	Pil Seung-indefeat, Yook Sung-hee, Lee Ju-yong	Han U	3:05
2.	"How Much You" (Inst.)			3:05

=== Part 20 ===
Released on May 2, 2022
No.	Title	Lyrics	Music	Artist	Length
1.	"It's You" (너라서 그런거야)	Jung Yun-kyung	Undefeated	The Daisy	3:39
2.	"It's You" (Inst.)				3:39

=== Part 21 ===
Released on May 9, 2022
No.	Title	Lyrics	Artist	Length
1.	"I'll Be the Light" (빛이 되어줄게)	Jun Nu-ri	Ha Jin-woo	3:38
2.	"I'll Be the Light" (Inst.)			3:38

=== Part 22 ===
Released on May 16, 2022
No.	Title	Lyrics	Music	Artist	Length
1.	"Parting" (이별중)	Jeon Nuri	Undefeated	Panini Brunch	3:37
2.	"Parting" (Inst.)				3:37

== Viewership ==
Audience response

Love Twist : South Korea viewers per episode (millions)

Episodes	Episode number																			
Episodes	1	2	3	4	5	6	7	8	9	10	11	12	13	14	15	16	17	18	19	20
Ep. 1–20	2.192	1.917	1.844	1.886	1.769	1.977	2.143	1.979	1.905	1.794	2.050	2.289	2.062	2.034	2.114	2.018	2.319	2.053	2.146	2.268
Ep. 21–40	2.199	2.261	2.137	2.197	2.142	2.223	2.430	2.066	2.268	2.316	2.435	2.379	2.462	2.392	2.371	2.329	2.104	2.490	2.269	2.451
Ep. 41–60	2.540	2.368	2.267	2.383	2.377	2.195	2.383	2.429	2.416	2.421	1.849	2.367	2.420	2.487	2.553	2.524	2.655	2.583	2.549	2.618
Ep. 61–80	2.502	2.586	2.467	2.597	2.614	2.566	2.708	2.523	2.485	2.541	2.427	2.459	2.489	2.490	2.575	2.625	2.530	2.327	2.613	2.587
Ep. 81–100	2.450	2.529	2.495	2.608	2.585	2.458	2.452	2.446	2.458	2.612	2.167	2.312	2.151	2.480	2.508	2.566	2.501	2.378	2.326	2.475
Ep. 101–103	2.271	2.430	2.209	–																

Source: Audience measurement performed nationwide by Nielsen Korea.

Ep.	Broadcast date	Average audience share		
Ep.	Broadcast date	Nielsen Korea		TNmS
Ep.	Broadcast date	Nationwide	Seoul	Nationwide
1	December 13, 2021	13.9% (2nd)	11.9% (2nd)	12.1% (2nd)
2	December 14, 2021	12.2% (2nd)	10.7% (3rd)	13.6% (2nd)
3	December 15, 2021	11.2% (3rd)	9.3% (4th)	12.4% (2nd)
4	December 16, 2021	12.1% (3rd)	10.9% (3rd)	12.7% (2nd)
5	December 17, 2021	11.6% (3rd)	9.8% (4th)	13.8% (2nd)
6	December 20, 2021	13.0% (2nd)	11.4% (2nd)	12.9% (2nd)
7	December 21, 2021	13.1% (2nd)	11.4% (2nd)	13.9% (2nd)
8	December 22, 2021	12.4% (2nd)	10.8% (3rd)	12.8% (2nd)
9	December 23, 2021	12.5% (3rd)	10.6% (3rd)	13.3% (2nd)
10	December 24, 2021	11.0% (4th)	10.0% (4th)	13.5% (2nd)
11	December 27, 2021	12.8% (2nd)	11.8% (2nd)	13.1% (2nd)
12	December 28, 2021	14.3% (2nd)	12.5% (2nd)	14.3% (2nd)
13	December 29, 2021	12.9% (2nd)	10.8% (2nd)	13.6% (2nd)
14	December 30, 2021	13.7% (2nd)	11.8% (2nd)	14.5% (2nd)
15	December 31, 2021	12.5% (2nd)	10.8% (2nd)	13.3% (2nd)
16	January 3, 2022	12.8% (2nd)	11.0% (3rd)	12.5% (2nd)
17	January 4, 2022	13.9% (2nd)	12.1% (2nd)	12.6% (2nd)
18	January 5, 2022	12.9% (2nd)	10.6% (2nd)	11.7% (2nd)
19	January 6, 2022	14.1% (2nd)	12.8% (2nd)	12.1% (2nd)
20	January 7, 2022	14.0% (2nd)	12.0% (2nd)	11.0% (2nd)
21	January 10, 2022	14.2% (2nd)	12.4% (2nd)	12.5% (2nd)
22	January 11, 2022	13.7% (2nd)	11.4% (2nd)	12.8% (2nd)
23	January 12, 2022	13.0% (3rd)	11.2% (3rd)	—N/a
24	January 13, 2022	13.3% (3rd)	11.9% (3rd)	12.2% (2nd)
25	January 14, 2022	13.3% (2nd)	—N/a	12.3% (2nd)
26	January 17, 2022	13.9% (2nd)	12.1% (2nd)	12.3% (2nd)
27	January 18, 2022	14.4% (2nd)	12.7% (2nd)	12.6% (2nd)
28	January 19, 2022	12.7% (2nd)	11.1% (2nd)	13.0% (2nd)
29	January 20, 2022	14.0% (2nd)	12.2% (2nd)	14.1% (2nd)
30	January 21, 2022	13.2% (2nd)	11.2% (2nd)	13.1% (2nd)
31	January 24, 2022	14.3% (2nd)	12.8% (2nd)	13.4% (2nd)
32	January 25, 2022	13.8% (2nd)	12.0% (2nd)	15.2% (2nd)
33	January 26, 2022	14.5% (2nd)	12.6% (2nd)	13.9% (2nd)
34	January 27, 2022	14.4% (2nd)	13.2% (2nd)	12.7% (2nd)
35	January 28, 2022	14.2% (2nd)	12.7% (2nd)	13.3% (2nd)
36	February 2, 2022 (Note: The 36th episode was cancelled for February 1, due to telecast of episode of the pilot entertainment program Capitalism School.)	13.3% (2nd)	11.6% (3rd)	12.1% (2nd)
37	February 3, 2022	12.4% (2nd)	10.3% (4th)	—N/a
38	February 4, 2022	14.8% (1st)	12.4% (1st)	13.7% (1st)
39	February 21, 2022 (Note: 39th episode will be aired on February 2q due to telecast of 2022 Beijing Winter Olympics for 2 weeks.)	13.5% (1st)	12.0% (1st)	14.4% (1st)
40	February 22, 2022	14.8% (2nd)	13.1% (2nd)	14.4% (2nd)
41	February 23, 2022	14.6% (2nd)	12.9% (2nd)	15.3% (2nd)
42	February 24, 2022	14.3% (2nd)	12.0% (3rd)	14.3% (2nd)
43	February 25, 2022	13.5% (1st)	11.9% (1st)	13.6% (1st)
44	February 28, 2022	14.6% (2nd)	13.3% (2nd)	14.5% (2nd)
45	March 1, 2022	14.1% (2nd)	12.0% (3rd)	15.7% (2nd)
46	March 2, 2022	13.2% (1st)	12.0% (1st)	13.4% (1st)
47	March 3, 2022	14.8% (2nd)	13.4% (2nd)	13.4% (2nd)
48	March 4, 2022	14.6% (1st)	13.0% (1st)	13.8% (1st)
49	March 7, 2022	14.6% (2nd)	12.7% (2nd)	14.2% (2nd)
50	March 8, 2022	14.5% (2nd)	12.6% (2nd)	16.2% (2nd)
51	March 9, 2022	10.6% (4th)	9.5% (5th)	—N/a
52	March 10, 2022	14.5% (2nd)	12.5% (2nd)	14.8% (2nd)
53	March 11, 2022	14.7% (2nd)	12.2% (2nd)	15.8% (2nd)
54	March 14, 2022	14.9% (2nd)	12.5% (2nd)	15.6% (2nd)
55	March 15, 2022	15.5% (2nd)	13.5% (2nd)	14.8% (2nd)
56	March 16, 2022	14.7% (2nd)	12.5% (2nd)	15.4% (2nd)
57	March 17, 2022	15.6% (2nd)	14.1% (2nd)	15.2% (2nd)
58	March 18, 2022	15.4% (2nd)	13.9% (2nd)	14.7% (2nd)
59	March 21, 2022	15.5% (2nd)	13.5% (2nd)	15.0% (2nd)
60	March 22, 2022	15.2% (2nd)	12.9% (2nd)	15.7% (2nd)
61	March 23, 2022	15.1% (2nd)	13.0% (2nd)	15.0% (2nd)
62	March 24, 2022	15.6% (2nd)	14.1% (2nd)	15.8% (2nd)
63	March 25, 2022	14.7% (2nd)	12.6% (2nd)	13.2% (2nd)
64	March 28, 2022	16.0% (2nd)	14.2% (2nd)	15.0% (2nd)
65	March 29, 2022	16.0% (2nd)	13.7% (2nd)	15.3% (2nd)
66	March 30, 2022	16.0% (2nd)	14.6% (2nd)	17.0% (2nd)
67	March 31, 2022	16.2% (2nd)	14.2% (2nd)	16.3% (2nd)
68	April 1, 2022	15.3% (2nd)	13.1% (2nd)	14.9% (2nd)
69	April 4, 2022	15.5% (2nd)	14.0% (2nd)	15.1% (2nd)
70	April 5, 2022	15.4% (2nd)	13.5% (2nd)	15.0% (2nd)
71	April 6, 2022	14.8% (2nd)	12.8% (2nd)	15.0% (2nd)
72	April 7, 2022	15.4% (2nd)	13.6% (2nd)	—N/a
73	April 8, 2022	14.8% (2nd)	12.6% (2nd)	—N/a
74	April 11, 2022	15.5% (2nd)	13.2% (2nd)	—N/a
75	April 12, 2022	15.7% (1st)	14.0% (1st)	15.0% (1st)
76	April 13, 2022	15.3% (1st)	13.3% (1st)	15.2% (2nd)
77	April 14, 2022	15.0% (2nd)	12.6% (2nd)	16.0% (2nd)
78	April 15, 2022	14.4% (2nd)	12.6% (2nd)	13.8% (2nd)
79	April 18, 2022	16.0% (2nd)	14.4% (2nd)	16.4% (2nd)
80	April 19, 2022	15.8% (1st)	14.0% (2nd)	15.2% (2nd)
81	April 20, 2022	15.3% (2nd)	13.2% (2nd)	15.7% (2nd)
82	April 21, 2022	15.3% (2nd)	13.7% (2nd)	16.6% (2nd)
83	April 22, 2022	15.6% (2nd)	14.2% (2nd)	13.7% (2nd)
84	April 25, 2022	16.2% (2nd)	13.5% (2nd)	15.3% (2nd)
85	April 26, 2022	16.0% (2nd)	13.9% (2nd)	15.5% (2nd)
86	April 27, 2022	14.0% (2nd)	12.4% (2nd)	14.6% (2nd)
87	April 28, 2022	15.7% (2nd)	13.8% (2nd)	14.9% (2nd)
88	April 29, 2022	15.1% (2nd)	12.9% (2nd)	14.6% (2nd)
89	May 2, 2022	15.3% (2nd)	13.3% (2nd)	15.2% (2nd)
90	May 3, 2022	16.3% (2nd)	14.3% (2nd)	14.8% (2nd)
91	May 4, 2022	14.1% (2nd)	12.6% (2nd)	15.3% (2nd)
92	May 5, 2022	14.2% (2nd)	12.6% (2nd)	14.6% (2nd)
93	May 6, 2022	13.3% (2nd)	11.9% (2nd)	13.2% (2nd)
94	May 9, 2022	15.7% (2nd)	14.0% (2nd)	15.1% (2nd)
95	May 10, 2022	15.4% (2nd)	13.2% (2nd)	14.8% (1st)
96	May 11, 2022	15.7% (1st)	14.1% (1st)	14.5% (1st)
97	May 12, 2022	16.0% (1st)	13.7% (1st)	15.2% (1st)
98	May 13, 2022	14.6% (1st)	12.5% (1st)	15.3% (1st)
99	May 16, 2022	14.8% (2nd)	12.7% (2nd)	14.7% (2nd)
100	May 17, 2022	15.2% (1st)	12.9% (2nd)	14.5% (2nd)
101	May 18, 2022	13.8% (2nd)	11.7% (2nd)	15.2% (2nd)
102	May 19, 2022	14.9% (2nd)	12.7% (2nd)	14.5% (2nd)
103	May 20, 2022	13.7% (2nd)	12.1% (2nd)	12.8% (2nd)
Average		%	%	%
In the table above, the blue numbers represent the lowest ratings and the red numbers represent the highest ratings.; NR denotes that the series did not rank in the top 20 daily programs on that date.; N/A denotes that the rating is not known.

== Accolades ==
=== Awards and nominations ===
Award ceremony	Year	Category	Nominee		Ref.
KBS Drama Awards	2022	Popularity Award - Female	Hahm Eun-jung	Nominated	
KBS Drama Awards	2022	Popularity Award - Male	Kim Jin-yeop	Nominated	
KBS Drama Awards	2022	Daily Drama of the Year	Love Twist	Nominated	
KBS Drama Awards	2022	Best Young Actress	Yoon Chae-na	Won	
KBS Drama Awards	2022	Female Excellence Award	Hahm Eun-jung	Nominated	
KBS Drama Awards	2022	Male Excellence Award	Kim Jin-yeop	Nominated	

=== Listicles ===
Year	Publication	List	Rank	Ref.
2021	Cosmopolitan Taiwan	December Korean drama recommendation	Placed	
