= Son Seong-yoon =

South Korean actress (born 1984)

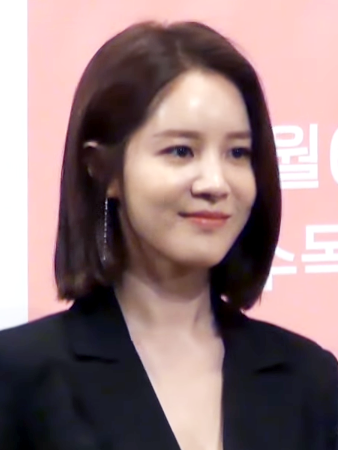
- Son in 2019
- Born: August 24, 1984 (age 42); Seoul, South Korea
- Other name: Son Sung-yoon
- Education: Kyonggi University – Department of Multimedia and Imaging
- Occupation: Actress
- Years active: 2005–present
- Agent: Woongbin ENS

Korean name
- Hangul: 손성윤
- RR: Son Seongyun
- MR: Son Sŏngyun

Son Seong-yoon (Korean: 손성윤; born August 24, 1984) is a South Korean actress. She is best known for her roles in the film The Wrath (2018), and The Prisoner (2020), and in the television series Touch Your Heart (2019), Once Again (2020), Bossam: Steal the Fate (2021), Love Twist (2021–2022), and Elegant Empire (2023).

== Career ==
Son debuted in TV series with 2006 KBS historical drama Hwang Jini.

Son appeared in tvN's Ugly Miss Young-ae Season 5 (2009), MBC's Pasta (2010). In 2011 she was cast in My Princess, Scent of a Woman and Bravo, My Love!

In 2015 she appeared in Divorce Lawyer in Love and KBS Drama Special season 6, episode 4 "Funny Woman". Later She appeared in TV series such as: Because This Is My First Life (2017) and What's Wrong with Secretary Kim (2018). In 2019 she appeared in Touch Your Heart as public prosecutor. In 2020, she played the role of Yoo Bo-young in KBS2 TV weekend drama Once Again, the Yoon Gyu-jin's (Lee Sang-yeob) first love.

On August 4, 2020, she signed an exclusive contract with Woongbin ENS.

In 2021, Son appeared in Bossam: Steal the Fate, My Roommate Is a Gumiho and KBS daily drama Love Twist as Kang Yoon-ah, one of the main cast.

== Filmography ==
=== Films ===
Year	Title	Role	Ref.
2018	The Wrath	Kyung-ran	
2020	The Prisoner	Tae-hee	

=== Television series ===
Year	Title	Role	Notes	Ref.
2006	Hwang Jini	Gisaeng		
2008	General Hospital 2	Son Maria		
2009	Ugly Miss Young-ae	Son Sung Yoon	Season 5	
2010	Pasta	Park Chan-hee		
2011	My Princess	Shin Mi-so		
2011	Scent of a Woman	Nam Na-ri		
2011	Bravo, My Love!	Kim Joo-hee		
2012	12 Signs of Love	Jang Min-joo		
2013	Samsaengi	Bong Geum-ok	Main antagonist	
2014	Mama	Kang Rae-yeon		
2015	Divorce Lawyer in Love	Cha Yoo-ran		
2015	KBS Drama Special: "Funny Woman"	Nam Ah-yeong	Season 6 Episode 4	
2016	Hwarang: The Poet Warrior Youth	Joon-jeong		
2017	Because This Is My First Life		Special appearance	
2018	What's Wrong with Secretary Kim	Kidnapper	Episode 11–12	
2019	Touch Your Heart	Yoo Yeo-reum		
2019	A Place in the Sun	Young Jang Jeong-hee		
2020	Once Again	Yoo Bo-young		
2021	Bossam: Steal the Fate	Hoo-nam		
2021	My Roommate Is a Gumiho	Seo Young-joo		
2021–2022	Love Twist	Kang Yoon-ah	Main antagonist	
2023–2024	Elegant Empire	Jacqueline Taylor	Main antagonist	
