= Rugal (TV series) =

2020 South Korean sci-fi television series

- Promotional poster
- Hangul: 루갈
- Lit.: Dry Tears
- RR: Rugal
- MR: Rugal
- Genre: Action; Science fiction
- Based on: Rugal by Rel.mae
- Developed by: OCN; Studio Dragon
- Written by: Do Hyun
- Directed by: Kang Cheol-woo; Lee Jung-soo
- Starring: Choi Jin-hyuk; Park Sung-woong; Jo Dong-hyuk; Jung Hye-in; Kim Min-sang; Han Ji-wan; Park Sun-ho
- Music by: Park Se-joon
- Country of origin: South Korea
- Original language: Korean
- No. of episodes: 16

Production
- Executive producer: Song Jin-sun
- Producer: Noh Ji-yeon
- Running time: 60–76 minutes
- Production company: LIAN Entertainment

Original release
- Network: OCN
- Release: March 28 – May 17, 2020

Rugal (Korean: 루갈) is a 2020 South Korean television series starring Choi Jin-hyuk, Park Sung-woong, Jo Dong-hyuk, Jung Hye-in, Kim Min-sang, Han Ji-wan and Park Sun-ho. Based on the webtoon of the same name by Rel.mae, it aired on OCN in South Korea and on Netflix worldwide from March 28 to May 17, 2020.

== Synopsis ==
Rugal tells the story of Kang Gi-beom (Choi Jin-hyuk), an elite police officer attempting to bring down one of South Korea's largest criminal organizations, Argos. In retaliation for his efforts, Kang's wife is killed by hitmen sent by Argos, and Kang is blinded and framed for the murder. Kang is later recruited by the NIS to join a special task force known as "Rugal", whose members are equipped with biotechnology, giving them superhuman abilities. After receiving two artificial eyeballs to regain and enhance his sight, Kang sets off to clear his name and bring those responsible for his wife's death to justice.

== Cast ==
=== Main ===
- Choi Jin-hyuk as Kang Gi-beom
- Park Sung-woong as Hwang Deuk-gu
- Jo Dong-hyuk as Han Tae-kwoong
- Jung Hye-in as Song Mi-na
- Kim Min-sang as Choi Geun-cheol
- Park Sun-ho as Lee Gwang-cheol
- Lee Sang-bo as Yang Moon-bok
- Han Ji-wan as Choi Ye-won

=== Supporting ===
- Jang In-sub as Bradley
- Jang Seo-kyung as Susan
- Park Choong-sun as Dr. Oh
- Yoo Sang-hoon as Min Dal-ho
- Park Jung-hak as Go Yong-duk
- Kim In-woo as Choi-yong
- Yoo Ji-yun as Jang Mi-joo
- Ji Dae-han as Bong Man-chul
- Kim Da-hyun as Seol Min-joon
- Han Gi-yoon as Kim Dae-shik
- Lee Seo-el as Kim Yeo-jin
- Dong Hyun-bae as Lee Jae-han

== Production ==
The first script reading took place in October 2019 at Donga Digital Media Center in Sangam-dong, Seoul, South Korea.

== Ratings ==
Rugal : South Korea viewers per episode (thousands)

Season	Episode number																Average
Season	1	2	3	4	5	6	7	8	9	10	11	12	13	14	15	16	Average
1	760	943	791	810	500	679	679	676	442	601	N/A	682	N/A	522	N/A	516	N/A

Source: Audience measurement performed nationwide by Nielsen Korea.

Average TV viewership ratings
Ep.	Original broadcast date	Average audience share	
Ep.	Original broadcast date	Nielsen Korea	
Ep.	Original broadcast date	Nationwide	Seoul
1	March 28, 2020	2.612%	2.781%
2	March 29, 2020	3.884%	4.075%
3	April 4, 2020	2.874%	3.206%
4	April 5, 2020	3.119%	3.879%
5	April 11, 2020	2.002%	—N/a
6	April 12, 2020	2.804%	3.437%
7	April 18, 2020	1.464%	—N/a
8	April 19, 2020	2.574%	2.921%
9	April 25, 2020	1.579%	—N/a
10	April 26, 2020	2.066%	2.318%
11	May 2, 2020	1.429%	—N/a
12	May 3, 2020	2.676%	3.407%
13	May 9, 2020	1.255%	—N/a
14	May 10, 2020	1.892%	2.072%
15	May 16, 2020	1.113%	—N/a
16	May 17, 2020	2.305%	2.472%
Average		2.228%	— (Note: Due to some ratings not recorded, the exact average rating is unknown.)
In the table above, the blue numbers represent the lowest ratings and the red numbers represent the highest ratings.; N/A denotes that the rating is not known.; This drama aired on a cable channel/pay TV which normally has a relatively smaller audience compared to free-to-air TV/public broadcasters (KBS, SBS, MBC and EBS).
