= Buddhist Broadcasting System =

South Korean radio and TV broadcaster

- BBS headquarters in Mapo
- Type: Radio network (1989–present); Television network (2002–present)
- Country: South Korea
- Founded: March 2, 1989; 37 years ago
- Headquarters: Mapo District, Seoul
- Broadcast area: South Korea
- Launch date: Radio: May 1, 1990; 36 years ago; Television: December 2, 2008; 17 years ago
- Official website: bbsi.co.kr

Korean name
- Hangul: 불교방송
- Hanja: 佛敎放送
- RR: Bulgyo bangsong
- MR: Pulgyo pangsong

The Buddhist Broadcasting System (BBS) is a South Korean religious radio and television network. It commenced broadcasts in 1990 as the first Buddhist religious network in the country. It airs both religious and non-religious programming.

== History ==
Before the Buddhist Broadcasting System went on air in 1990, the only religious radio stations in South Korea were Christian. Movements to improve access to Buddhist media and culture sprouted in response, leading to the creation of Buddhist newspapers in the 1980s and 1990s.

In late 1988, a steering committee for the establishment of the Buddhist Broadcasting System was created. After receiving an official license from the Ministry of Posts and Telecommunications in November the following year, the BBS commenced test broadcasts in March 1990, and formally launched services on May 1. At the time of its launching, it was the first completely Buddhist radio station in the world.

Initially, the station broadcast exclusively to the Seoul area on 101.9 MHz in the FM band. Later, broadcasts extended to other key cities. The BBS solicited eleven licenses to the government to build its national network, with Busan (89.9MHz; February 1, 1995) and Gwangju (89.7MHz; March 1, 1995) becoming the first regions with an affiliate station. Daegu (94.5MHz; November 11, 1996) and Cheongju (96.7Mhz; April 25, 1997) followed suit. When Jo Hae-hyung was appointed president of BBS in 1996, there were plans to expand the network to smaller cities, besides the five cities where it already had stations.

Starting from 2006, BBS began eyeing the production of video content, but its implementation was slow. In March 2008 the broadcaster attempted to acquire the existing Buddhist cable network BTN. If approved, BBS would use 4 to 5 billion won (out of a total budget of 8 billion) to integrate its operations and, post-merger, strengthen BBS's position in the Buddhist media sector in Korea. BBS registered for a television license on August 2, 2008, and started television broadcasts on subscription television operators on December 2, 2008, starting with KT's IPTV operator. The service was later extended to LG's U+ on January 1, 2009, and SK's IPTV service on April 1, 2009. The broadcaster opted for IPTV rather than conventional cable and satellite at first. BBS TV started broadcasting on cable networks in the 2012–2013 period, as well as the satellite television operator Skylife.

During its early years of service, the BBS had been the target of anti-Buddhist incidents, during the first of which a letter was sent to the station threatening them to close services, with the writer labeling the broadcast "the sound of the devil". However, no arrests were made. In May 1990, two men assaulted the station's facilities, threw the bronze Buddha statue away from its facilities, and damaged US$100,000 worth of equipment, rendering it inoperable for a few months.
