= 2023 KBS Drama Awards =

37th edition of award ceremony

- Official logo
- Date: December 31, 2023
- Site: KBS Hall, Yeouido, Seoul
- Hosted by: Jang Sung-kyu; Rowoon; Seol In-ah
- Official website: KBS Drama Awards

Highlights
- Grand Prize (Daesang): Choi Soo-jong – Korea–Khitan War

Television coverage
- Network: KBS2

The 2023 KBS Drama Awards, presented by Korean Broadcasting System (KBS), was held on December 31, 2023, from 21:25 (KST) at KBS Hall in Yeouido, Seoul. It was hosted by Jang Sung-kyu, Rowoon and Seol In-ah.

== Winners and nominees ==
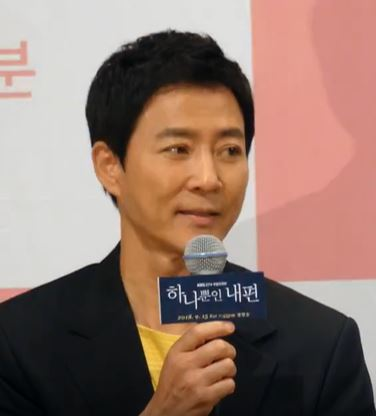
Choi Soo-jong

Winners of Grand Prize (Daesang)

Winners are listed first and denoted in bold.

Grand Prize (Daesang)
**Choi Soo-jong – Korea–Khitan War**
Top Excellence Award, Actor	Top Excellence Award, Actress
**Kim Dong-jun – Korea–Khitan War**; **Rowoon – The Matchmakers**; Choi Soo-jong – Korea–Khitan War; Jang Dong-yoon – Oasis; Kim Dong-wook – My Perfect Stranger	**Uee – Live Your Own Life**; Cho Yi-hyun – The Matchmakers; Baek Jin-hee – The Real Has Come!; Jin Ki-joo – My Perfect Stranger; Seol In-ah – Oasis
Excellence Award, Actor in a Miniseries	Excellence Award, Actress in a Miniseries
**Jang Dong-yoon – Oasis**; Choo Young-woo – Oasis; Kim Dong-wook – My Perfect Stranger; Jung Yong-hwa – Brain Works; Lee Sang-yeob – My Lovely Boxer; Ok Taec-yeon – Heartbeat; Rowoon – The Matchmakers	**Cho Yi-hyun – The Matchmakers**; **Seol In-ah – Oasis**; Jin Ki-joo – My Perfect Stranger; Kim So-hye – My Lovely Boxer; Kwak Sun-young – Brain Works; Won Ji-an – Heartbeat
Excellence Award, Actor in a Serial Drama	Excellence Award, Actress in a Serial Drama
**Ha Jun – Live Your Own Life**; **Ji Seung-hyun – Korea–Khitan War**; Ahn Jae-hyun – The Real Has Come!; Choi Soo-jong – Korea–Khitan War; Go Joo-won – Live Your Own Life; Kim Dong-jun – Korea–Khitan War; Kim Joon-bae – Korea–Khitan War	**Baek Jin-hee – The Real Has Come!**; Kang Boo-ja – The Real Has Come!; Lee Si-a – Korea–Khitan War; Uee – Live Your Own Life; Yoon Mi-ra – Live Your Own Life
Excellence Award, Actor in a Daily Drama	Excellence Award, Actress in a Daily Drama
**Seo Jun-young – Apple of My Eye**; **Lee Si-gang – The Elegant Empire**; Han Ki-woong – Woman in a Veil; Lee Eun-hyung – Woman in a Veil; Lee Jong-won – Unpredictable Family	**Choi Yoon-young – Woman in a Veil**; **Nam Sang-ji – Unpredictable Family**; Han Ji-wan – The Elegant Empire; Lee Chae-young – Woman in a Veil; Son Seong-yoon – The Elegant Empire; Yoon Da-young – Apple of My Eye
Best Actor in Drama Special/TV Cinema	Best Actress in Drama Special/TV Cinema
**Lee Jae-won – "No Path Back"**; Choi Min-gi – "Behind the Shadows"; Kim Do-hoon – "Love Attack"; Kim Dong-hwi – "Overlap Knife, Knife"; Kim Joo-hun – "The True Love of Madam"; Lee Min-jae – "Anyone Anywhere"; Yoon San-ha – "Joseon Chefs"	**Chae Won-bin – "Love Attack"**; **Hong Seung-hee – "Behind the Shadows"**; Jo Ah-ram – "Overlap Knife, Knife"; Kim Hyun-soo – "Anyone Anywhere"; Lee Yeon – "Shoot For Love"; Park Ha-sun – "The True Love of Madam"
Best Supporting Actor	Best Supporting Actress
**Jo Han-chul – The Matchmakers**; **Kim Myung-soo – Oasis**; **Lee Won-jong – Korea–Khitan War**; Choi Young-woo – My Perfect Stranger; Kim Hyuk – Korea–Khitan War; Kim Jong-soo – My Perfect Stranger; Park Ji-hwan – My Lovely Boxer	**Kang Kyung-hun – "Behind the Shadows" and Oasis**; Cha Joo-young – The Real Has Come!; Hong Na-hyun – My Perfect Stranger; Kim Hye-ok – The Real Has Come!; Nam Bo-ra – Live Your Own Life; Park Ji-young – The Matchmakers; Ye Ji-won – Brain Works; Yoon So-hee – Heartbeat
Best New Actor	Best New Actress
**Lee Won-jung – My Perfect Stranger**; **Choo Young-woo – Oasis**; Heo Nam-jun – The Matchmakers; Jung Eui-jae – The Real Has Come!; Kim Do-yeon – Live Your Own Life; Park Kang-hyun – Heartbeat	**Seo Ji-hye – My Perfect Stranger**; Chae Won-bin – My Lovely Boxer, "Love Attack"; Jung Bo-min – The Matchmakers; Kim Vi-ju – Oasis, Live Your Own Life; Lee Si-a – Korea–Khitan War; Won Ji-an – Heartbeat
Best Young Actor	Best Young Actress
**Moon Woo-jin – "Dog Days of Summer"**; Hong Dong-young – The Matchmakers; Hong Jae-min – Korea–Khitan War; Jung Min-joon – Unpredictable Family; Kim Si-woo – The Matchmakers; Lee Joo-won – Live Your Own Life; Song Seung-hwan – My Perfect Stranger	**Kim Si-eun – Apple of My Eye**; Jung Seo-yeon – The Real Has Come!; Kim Kyu-na – "Shoot For Love"; Kim Si-woo – "Half Lies"; Kim Yu-ha – Live Your Own Life; Lee Ga-yeon – Live Your Own Life; Lee Ye-joo – The Matchmakers; Park Seo-kyung – "Dog Days of Summer"
Popularity Award, Actor	Popularity Award, Actress
**Ahn Jae-hyun – The Real Has Come!**; **Ji Seung-hyun – Korea–Khitan War**; **Lee Sang-yeob – My Lovely Boxer**; **Rowoon – The Matchmakers**	**Cho Yi-hyun – The Matchmakers**; **Seol In-ah – Oasis**; **Uee – Live Your Own Life**
Best Couple Award	Scriptwriter Award
**Ahn Jae-hyun and Baek Jin-hee – The Real Has Come!**; **Ha Jun and Uee – Live Your Own Life**; **Jang Dong-yoon and Seol In-ah – Oasis**; **Choi Soo-jong and Kim Dong-jun – Korea–Khitan War**; **Rowoon and Cho Yi-hyun – The Matchmakers**	**Lee Jung-woo – Korea–Khitan War**

== Presenters ==
Presenter(s)	Award(s)	Ref.
Choi Soo-jong	Scriptwriter Award	
Krystal Jung	Popularity Award	
Lee Yu-jin and Kang Mi-na	Best New Actor/Actress	
Ji Hyun-woo	Top Excellence Award, Actor/Actress	
Cha Hak-yeon and Shin Eun-soo	Best Actor/Actress in Drama Special/TV Cinema	
Yoon Chae-na and Jung Min-joon	Best Young Actor/Actress	
Heo Sung-tae and Park Ji-yeon	Best Supporting Actor/Actress	
Baek Sung-hyun and Hahm Eun-jung	Excellence Award, Actor/Actress in a Daily Drama	
Jang Sung-kyu, Rowoon, and Seol In-ah	Best Couple Award	
Kim Joon-bae and Kim Hyuk	Excellence Award, Actor/Actress in a Serial Drama	
Lee Joon and Lee Yoo-young	Excellence Award, Actor/Actress in a Miniseries	
Joo Sang-wook and Im Dong-jin	Grand Prize (Daesang)	

== Performances ==
Order	Artist	Act performed	Ref.
1	Harmonize	KBS OST medley choir	
2	Golden Girls	"One Last Time"	
3	Young Tak and Kim Yu-ha	"FORM" by Young Tak	

== See also ==
- 2023 SBS Drama Awards
- 2023 MBC Drama Awards
