= Oasis (South Korean TV series) =

2023 South Korean television series

- Promotional poster
- Hangul: 오아시스
- RR: Oasiseu
- MR: Oasisŭ
- Genre: Melodrama; Period drama; Romance; Coming-of-age
- Written by: Jung Hyung-soo
- Directed by: Han Hee
- Starring: Jang Dong-yoon; Seol In-ah; Choo Young-woo
- Music by: Yoon Sang
- Country of origin: South Korea
- Original language: Korean
- No. of episodes: 16

Production
- Executive producer: Kim Sang-hui (KBS)
- Producers: Lim Sung-kyun; Kim Dong-rae
- Cinematography: Park Min-woo
- Running time: 75 minutes
- Production companies: Say On Media; RaemongRaein
- Budget: ₩14 billion

Original release
- Network: KBS2
- Release: March 6 – April 25, 2023

Oasis (Korean: 오아시스) is a 2023 South Korean television series starring Jang Dong-yoon, Seol In-ah, and Choo Young-woo. It aired on KBS2 from March 6 to April 25, 2023, every Monday and Tuesday at 21:50 (KST). It is also available for streaming on Wavve in South Korea, and on Viki in selected regions.

== Synopsis ==
Set against the turbulent backdrop of South Korea from the 1980s to the 1990s, the series depicts the story of three young people who fight fiercely to protect their dreams, friendship, and their one and only first love.

== Cast ==
=== Main ===
- Jang Dong-yoon as Lee Doo-hak: the son of a farmer in a quiet and small village in Yeosu. He is forced into the life of crime due to circumstances.
- Seol In-ah as Oh Jung-shin: an honest and confident woman who knows how to fight against injustice.
- Choo Young-woo as Choi Chul-woong: A prosecutor and Doo-hak's childhood friend-turned-rival who is an intelligent and competitive man. He is also secretly Doo-hak's biological younger brother by the name Lee Chul Woong and also Jung-ok's older brother

=== Supporting ===
==== People around Doo-hak ====
- Kim Myung-soo as Lee Jung-ho: Doo-hak, Chul-woong and Jung-ok's father who is a farmer with a slave mentality.
- So Hee-jung as Jeom Am-daek: Doo-hak's, Chul-woong's and Jung-ok's mother.
- Shin Yun-ha as Lee Jung-ok: Doo-hak's and Chul-woong's younger sister.
- Do Sang-woo as Kim Hyung-joo: a young man who meets Doo-hak by chance and then unites with him in loyalty to confront the chaotic era.
- Song Tae-yoon as Kim Gil-soo: Doo-hak's right-hand man.
- Ahn Dong-yeop as Jo Seon-woo: a high school boxer.
- Han Jae-young as Yeom Gwang-tak: Mugyo-dong Tak-ipa boss who operates nightclubs, tourist hotels, and liquor wholesalers.
- Jang Young-hyun as Yoo Young-pil: Tak-ipa's action leader.
- Lee Han-wi as Go Pung-ho: a former criminal in real estate fraud, whom Doo-hak met in prison.
- Jung Ji-soon as Jang Jang-deuk: a member of Pung-ho's real estate fraud organization called Joseobang.
- Lee Gyo-yeop as Son Su-gong: a document counterfeiter.
- Jang Da-kyung as Ma Cheong-ja: a member of Pung-ho's real estate fraud organization called Joseobang.
- Im Seung-jun as Wolf: a member of Tak-ipa.
- Jo Dong-woo as Rotary: a member of Tak-ipa.

==== People around Jung-shin ====
- Kang Ji-eun as Cha Geum-ok: an exclusive distributor and producer of films in Gwangju and Jeonnam, who is also Jung-shin's mentor.
- Seunghee as Ham Yang-ja: Jung-shin's best friend.
- Ahn Jung-hoon as Go Moon-geun: Geum-ok's butler.

==== People around Chul-woong ====
- Kang Kyung-hun as Kang Yeo-jin: Chul-woong's adoptive mother.
- Jeon No-min as Hwang Chung-seong: a former brigadier general of the security forces and the current deputy director of the Agency for National Security Planning.
- Jin Yi-han as Oh Man-ok: Chung-seong's right-hand man.
- Park Won-sang as Choi Young-sik: Chul-woong's adoptive father and a rich millowner and former politician who represents the poors.
- Ha Hye-seung as Gyeong-ja: a maid who works at Chul-woong's house.

==== Others ====
- Bae Seul-ki as Song Yeon-ju: a successful actress in both movies and dramas.
- Kang Pil-seon as Moon Dong-su: a night school teacher and leader of the Guro Industrial Complex union.
- Ahn Da-bi as Gil-ja: Jung-ok's hometown sister.
- Jang Young-jun as Ki Young-tak: a student from another school who bullies Chul-woong.

=== Extended ===
- Jung Bo-min as Geum Yeon-hee: CEO of Changsung Fashion.
- Kim Bi-joo as Chae Ha-yeon: a clever strategist who is good at numbers and plans to play an active role as an assistant to help Doo-hak's revenge.

=== Special appearance ===
- Kim Hyo-jin as Oh Tae-ja: Jung-shin's aunt.

== Production ==
Filming began in September 2022.

== Viewership ==
Oasis : South Korea viewers per episode (millions)

Season	Episode number																Average
Season	1	2	3	4	5	6	7	8	9	10	11	12	13	14	15	16	Average
1	1.099	0.939	1.178	1.156	1.145	1.133	1.112	1.261	1.010	1.133	1.109	1.239	1.191	1.255	1.331	1.637	1.183

Source: Audience measurement performed nationwide by Nielsen Korea.

Average TV viewership ratings
Ep.	Original broadcast date	Average audience share		
Ep.	Original broadcast date	Nielsen Korea		TNmS
Ep.	Original broadcast date	Nationwide	Seoul	Nationwide
1	March 6, 2023	6.3% (9th)	6.2% (6th)	5.1% (15th)
2	March 7, 2023	5.2% (10th)	4.8% (9th)	4.7% (13th)
3	March 13, 2023	6.6% (6th)	6.5% (4th)	5.3% (10th)
4	March 14, 2023	6.4% (6th)	6.2% (4th)	5.7% (11th)
5	March 20, 2023	6.5% (5th)	5.9% (6th)	4.5% (14th)
6	March 21, 2023	6.7% (5th)	6.3% (4th)	5.3% (11th)
7	March 27, 2023	6.4% (7th)	6.2% (5th)	4.9% (12th)
8	March 28, 2023	7.4% (4th)	7.6% (3rd)	5.6% (10th)
9	April 3, 2023	6.2% (6th)	6.2% (4th)	4.6% (14th)
10	April 4, 2023	6.8% (5th)	6.6% (4th)	5.7% (12th)
11	April 10, 2023	6.9% (5th)	6.7% (4th)	5.1% (13th)
12	April 11, 2023	7.1% (5th)	6.7% (4th)	5.8% (10th)
13	April 17, 2023	6.8% (5th)	6.4% (4th)	6.2% (10th)
14	April 18, 2023	7.7% (5th)	7.4% (3rd)	5.9% (8th)
15	April 24, 2023	8.0% (5th)	8.2% (3rd)	5.5% (12th)
16	April 25, 2023	9.7% (3rd)	9.6% (3rd)	7.2% (7th)
Average		6.9%	6.7%	5.4%
In the table above, the blue numbers represent the lowest ratings and the red numbers represent the highest ratings.
