= Jo Han-chul =

South Korean actor (born 1973)

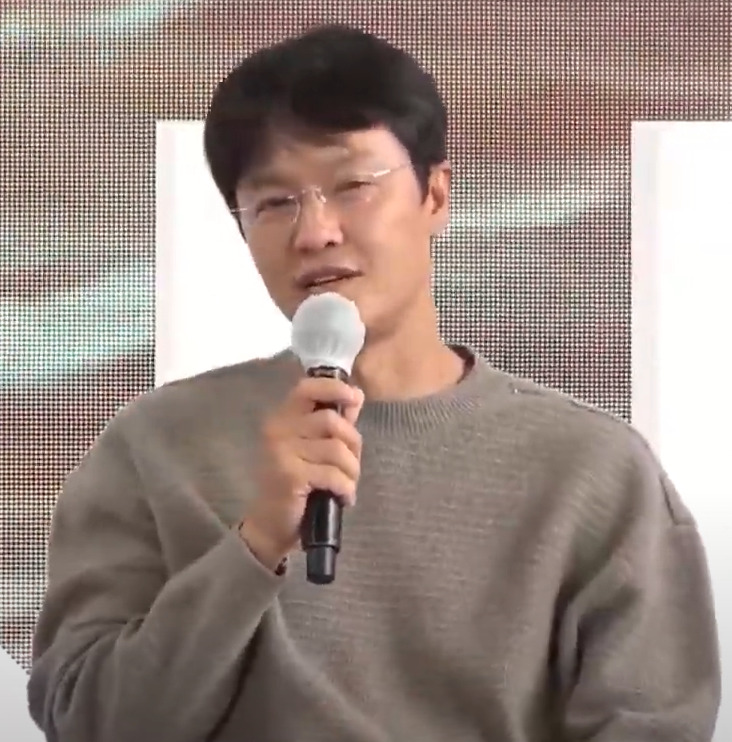
- Jo at the 26th Busan International Film Festival in 2021
- Born: June 13, 1973 (age 53); Cheongdam-dong, Gangnam District, Seoul, South Korea
- Education: Cheongju University (Department of Theater and Film); Korea National University of Arts (Department of Acting)
- Occupation: Actor
- Years active: 1998–present
- Agent: Noon Company
- Spouse: Kang Ki-jeong (m. 2000)
- Children: 2

Korean name
- Hangul: 조한철
- RR: Jo Hancheol
- MR: Cho Hanch'ŏl

Jo Han-chul (Korean: 조한철; born June 13, 1973) is a South Korean actor. After two decades in the industry, his breakthrough came in 2018 with a role as an afterlife prosecutor in Kim Yong-hwa's ten-million-viewer film Along with the Gods: The Last 49 Days, and in the historical drama 100 Days My Prince.

Jo Han-chul debuted in the play One Room in 1998 and was active in theater for a long time. Subsequently, he moved between television dramas and films, primarily playing supporting roles. He is also known for his supporting roles in numerous high-rated television dramas, including Vincenzo (2021), Hometown Cha-Cha-Cha (2021), Jirisan (2021), Reborn Rich (2022), Gyeongseong Creature (2024) and Love Next Door (2024).

== Early life and education ==
Jo Han-cheol first aspired to become an actor during his third year of middle school after attending a theatrical production in Daehangno. He later attended Cheongju University, where he earned an undergraduate degree in Film Directing from the Department of Theatre and Film. He continued his academic studies at the Korea National University of Arts, receiving a master's degree in acting. His graduation thesis, titled "Research on Film Acting in relation to the unique characteristics of media in films, with a critical examination of American method acting," focused on the intersection of media-specific performance and traditional acting techniques.

== Career ==
Jo debuted as a theater actor in 1998 in the play One Room. A year later, he made his first appearance in a movie with a small role in Peppermint Candy. He has appeared in various other films, including Theatrical Exhibition, Ask the One Who Can, The Most Beautiful Breakup in the World, Moby Dick, Yeonga City, Scary Story, Feng Shui, 48 Meters, Wonderful Woman, Scandal: A Very Shocking and Immoral Incident, Hide and Seek, and The Five.

In 2008, Jo joined the encore performance of Park Su-jin's play Applause for Juliet, directed by Min Bok-ki. The play, which originally premiered in 2004, received acclaim for its vibrant dialogue and imaginative storytelling. Jo portrayed Seok-dong (Hamlet), alongside Lee Jin-hee as Seon-jeong (Ophelia), Min-ho as Romeo, and Bok-soon as Juliet. The play explores a complex web of conflicting love in a contemporary setting that combines elements of Hamlet and Romeo and Juliet.

After two decades in the industry, Jo's breakthrough came with his portrayal of an afterlife prosecutor in the box office hit Along with the Gods: The Last 49 Days. He was not the first choice for this role, having replaced Oh Dal-su, who withdrew from the film. That same year, Jo also achieved a significant breakthrough in television dramas by playing the role of a king in 100 Days My Prince. He was cast as a replacement for Yoon Tae-young. The 2018 tvN historical drama is ranked among the highest-rated Korean dramas on cable television.

Jo had a role in the romance film Even If This Love Disappears From the World Tonight directed by Kim Hye-young, based on the novel of the same name. It was released theatrically on Christmas Eve 2025, and is also available to stream on Netflix since February 2026.

== Other activities ==
He served as an instructor in applied acting classes at the Department of Theatre and Film at Dankook University. He was also an acting teacher and previously worked as an instructor at SM Entertainment.

== Personal life ==
In 2015, Jo announced that he and his wife were celebrating their 15th wedding anniversary. At the time of the announcement, the couple has two children: a son, who was in his first year of middle school and a daughter, then in the fifth grade of elementary school. Jo's wife, Kang Ki-jeong, is one year his junior and was a childhood acquaintance from the same neighborhood. The two reunited at age 28 and married after a three month courtship. Jo has stated that their frequent interactions provided a sense of comfort that influenced his decision to marry. While Jo focused on his acting career, Kang transitioned from fashion design to the creation of stage costumes for theatrical and musical productions. She remains an active figure in the Daehangno theater district.

== Filmography ==
=== Film ===
Year	Title	Role	Notes	Ref.
1999	Peppermint Candy			
2005	Tale of Cinema	Sang Won's older brother		
2006	Sundays in August	Tae Jin		
2007	Milky Way Liberation Front			
2007	Off Road	Sang-Hoon		
2010	Read My Lips	Pastor Jo		
2010	Finding Mr. Destiny	Yun-Chool		
2011	The Last Blossom	Chief Director of Jungchul Hospital		
2011	Moby Dick	Park Jeong Gil		
2012	Deranged	Researcher		
2012	Horror Stories	Army doctor		
2012	Romance Joe	Director Lee		
2012	All About My Wife	Public officer at divorce court		
2013	48m	Jo Han-Cheol		
2013	Hide and Seek	Jung-Nam		
2013	Red Family	Loan shark		
2013	The Five	Kim Sung Il		
2013	Steel Cold Winter	Doctor		
2014	Remarkable Woman	Cafe employee		
2014	Sookhee	Professor Yun		
2014	Super Virgin			
2015	The Treacherous	Park Won-jong		
2016	The Wailing	Detective 1		
2016	Horror Stories III	Survival Earth Armed Forces		
2016	Luck Key	Il-Sung		
2016	Pandora	President of Shimwon E&C		
2016	Papa Zombie	Gong Han-cheol		
2017	The Mayor	Yang Jin-joo's campaign manager		
2017	Heart Blackened	Jung Seung-Gil		
2018	The Pension	Choo-Ho		
2018	Along with the Gods: The Last 49 Days	Prosecutor		
2018	Default	Lee Dae-Hwan		
2019	Romang	Jo Jin-soo		
2019	Juror 8	Choi Yeong-jae		
2019	Cheer Up, Mr. Lee	Duk Goo		
2019	Black Money	Kim Nam-gyu		
2019	Ashfall	Colonel		
2020	Honest Candidate	Nam Yong-Sung		
2020	The Day I Died: Unclosed Case	Lawyer Oh		
2021	Three Sisters	Dong-Wook		
2021	New Year Blues	CEO Yoon		
2021	Sweet & Sour	Patient	Netflix film	
2021	The Cursed: Dead Man's Prey	Park Yong-Ho		
2021	Heaven: To the Land of Happiness			
2023	The Moon	Minister of Science and Technology		
2024	My Name Is Loh Kiwan	Yoon-seong	Netflix film	
2026	The Ultimate Duo	Min-ho		

=== Television series ===
Year	Title	Role	Notes	Ref.
2007	New Heart	Cleveland clinic surgeon		
2009	Iris	Captain Jung		
2012–2013	The Great Seer	Moo-Young		
2013	She is Wow!	Hyeon Sang-Beom		
2013	The Scandal	Shin Kang-Ho		
2014	High School King of Savvy	Kim Chang-Soo		
2014–2015	Healer	Yoon Dong-Won		
2015	Flower of Queen	Kim Do-Shin		
2015	The Producers	Secretary Kim		
2015	My Beautiful Bride	Park Tae-Gyu		
2015	Oh My Ghost	Doctor Hong	Cameo (Episode 5)	
2015	The Village: Achiara's Secret	Detective Choi		
2016	My Lawyer, Mr. Jo	Kim Tae-Jung		
2017	Tomorrow, with You	Doo-Sik		
2017	Criminal Minds	Jang Ki-Tae		
2018	Mother	Chang-Geun		
2018	100 Days My Prince	King		
2018	Feel Good to Die	Yoon Dong-Chan		
2019	Romance Is a Bonus Book'	Bong Ji-hong		
2019	Kill It	Ko Hyun-Woo		
2019	Perfume	Kim Tae-Joon		
2020	Nobody Knows	Yoon Hee-seob		
2020	Memorist	Jin Jae-Gyu		
2020	Kkondae Intern	Ramen shop man	Cameo (Episode 7, 11, 18)	
2020	Once Again	Jo Won-Chul	Cameo	
2021	Hello, Me!	Store manager	Cameo (Episode 1–2)	
2021	Vincenzo	Han Seung-Hyeok		
2021	Hometown Cha-Cha-Cha	Oh Chun-jae		
2021	Jirisan	Park Il-hae		
2022	Love All Play	Lee Tae-sang		
2022	The Law Cafe	Lee Pyun-woong		
2022	Reborn Rich	Jin Dong-ki		
2023	Stealer: The Treasure Keeper	Jang Tae-in		
2023	The Matchmakers	The King		
2024	The Auditors	Pyeon In-Ho (ep.5-6)		
2024	Love Next Door	Bae Geun-sik		
2025	Spring of Youth	Jo Sang-heon		
2025	S Line	Kim Byeong-cheol	Special appearance (Episode 3)	
2025	Heroes Next Door	Kim Seok-jun		

=== Web series ===
Year	Title	Role	Notes	Ref.
2014	Prominent Woman	Cafe employee		
2014	Flirty Boy and Girl	Workaholic / Man #1	Main Role	
2018	Top Management	President Baek	Cameo	
2020	Kingdom	Won Yu	Season 2	
2022	The Sound of Magic	Yoon Ah-yi's father		
2022	Weak Hero Class 1	Beom-seok's father	Special Appearance	
2022	Big Bet	Kim Gye-jang	Special Appearance	
2023	Race	Song Seon-tae		
2023–2024	Gyeongseong Creature	Yoon Joong-won	Season 1–2	
2024	Queen Woo	Woo Do		
2025	Mercy for None	Seong-cheol		

=== Television show ===
Year	Title		Role	Ref.
Year	English	Korean	Role	Ref.
2007	Actors' Association	배우반상회	Cast member	

=== Music video appearances ===
Music video appearances
Year	Title	Artist(s)	Ref.
2004	"Misty Moon"	Lim Hyung-joo	

== Stage ==
=== Theater ===
Theater performances
Year	Title		Role	Theater	Date	Ref.
Year	English	Korean	Role	Theater	Date	Ref.
1998	One Room	원룸	—N/a			
1999	Mount Obong is on Fire	오봉산 불지르다	Hwang Geochang's son, male	Egg and Nucleus Small Theater	April 20 – May 9	
2001	Barbarian Woman Ongnyeo	오랑캐 여자 옹녀	Gangsoe	Korea National University of Arts Arts Theater	May 17–19	
2002	Korean Wooturi	우리나라 우투리	pampas grass mower, people moving Mt. Jirisan, servant	Seoul Arts Center free small theater	August 23 – September 1	
2004	Between Coolness and Passion	냉정과 열정사이	Jun-sei	Daehakro Installation Theater Jeongmiso	Mar 11 – May 9	
2005	(2005) Asian Theater Directors Workshop; person who comes to mind	(2005) 아시아연극연출가워크샵; 생각나는 사람	Jo Han-chul	Polymedia Theater	April 13–15	
2005	Assassin Fever	밀크우드	Western man, Jo Mal, Beongi, Jinwang Yeong-jeong, Sasha, gentleman, Minister of Defense	Arko Arts Theater Small Theater	Oct 4–7	
2006	Joseon Coalition Scandal Hoya	조선 연정 스캔들 호야	King	Miryang Theater Village	July 21 – Aug 1	
2006	Milkwood	자객열전	pampas grass mower, people moving Mt. Jirisan, servant	Cultural Arts Promotion Agency Arts Theater	February 11–27	
2007	The Cockscomb Flower	맨드라미꽃	Joo-hye	Daehangno Black Box Theater	Jan 12–28	
2007	The Crucible	시련	Pastor John Hale	Seoul Arts Center CJ Towol Theater	April 11–29	
2007	Melodrama	멜로드라마	Kim Chan-il	Daehak-ro T.O.M. Hall 2	Sep 6 – Dec 31	
2008	Applause for Julie	줄리에게 박수를	Hamlet (Seokdong)	Doosan Art Center Space111	March 8 – May 5	
2008	Melodrama	멜로드라마	Kim Chan-il	Daehak-ro T.O.M. Hall 2	Sep 5 – Nov 2	
2008	Joseon Coalition Scandal Hoya	조선 연정 스캔들 호야	Man	Daehakro Theater	Nov 14–30	
2010	Hoya	호야(好夜)	King	Namsan Arts Center	Jan 23–31	
2010	Tournament	토너먼트	Im Jin-taek (second son)	LG Art Center	April 20–25	
2017	His and Her Thursday	그와 그녀의 목요일	Jung-min	Daehak-ro Dream Art Center Building 2	July 22 – Aug 20	

=== Musical ===
List of musical work(s)
Year	Title		Role	Theater	Date	Ref.
Year	English	Korean	Role	Theater	Date	Ref.
2006	March! Waikiki Brothers	행진! 와이키키 브라더스	Byeon Gang-su	National Theater Haeoreum Theater	March 3 – April 9	
2007	Hard Rock Cafe - Lost In Paradise	하드락 카페 - Lost In Paradise	Hwang Sajang	the National Museum of Korea	Jan 6 – Feb 16	
2008	New March, Waikiki!	新행진, 와이키키!	Byeon Gang-su	National Theater Haeoreum Theater	June 7–15	
2008	New March, Waikiki!	新행진, 와이키키!	Byeon Gang-su	Daejeon Arts Center Art Hall	June 27–29	
2008	New March, Waikiki!	新행진, 와이키키!	Byeon Gang-su	Seongnam Art Center Opera House	July 4–6	
2009	New March, Waikiki!	新행진, 와이키키!	Byeon Gang-su	National Theater Haeoreum Theater	Feb 8 – March 11	
2009	Hero	영웅	Man	LG Art Center	Oct 26 – Dec 31	

== Discography ==
=== Soundtrack appearances ===
Title	Year	Album	Notes	Ref.
"Exercise at the Moonlit Night" (달밤에 체조)	2021	Hometown Cha-Cha-Cha OST Disc 1	As Oh Yoon, a singer, his role in the drama.	
"The Beginning of the End" (끝과 시작)	2021	Hometown Cha-Cha-Cha OST Disc 1	As Oh Yoon, a singer, his role in the drama.	

== Awards and nominations ==
Name of the award ceremony, year presented, category, nominee of the award, and the result of the nomination
Award ceremony	Year	Category	Nominee / Work	Result	Ref.
APAN Star Awards	2023	Excellence Award, Actor in a Miniseries	Reborn Rich, Stealer: The Treasure Keeper	Won	
KBS Drama Awards	2022	Best Supporting Actor	Love All Play, The Law Cafe	Nominated	
KBS Drama Awards	2023	Best Supporting Actor	The Matchmakers	Won	
