= Live Your Own Life =

2023–2024 South Korean television series

- Promotional poster
- Also known as: Hyo-shim's Independent Life
- Hangul: 효심이네 각자도생
- RR: Hyosimine gakjadosaeng
- MR: Hyosimine kakchadosaeng
- Genre: Family drama; Romance
- Developed by: KBS Drama Division
- Written by: Jo Jeong-seon
- Directed by: Kim Hyeong-il
- Starring: Uee; Ha Jun; Go Joo-won
- Music by: Choi In-hee; Oh Hye-joo
- Country of origin: South Korea
- Original language: Korean
- No. of episodes: 51

Production
- Executive producer: Kim Sang-hui (KBS)
- Producers: Ahn Chang-hyun; Park Dan-bi; Woo Yes-ran
- Camera setup: Single-camera
- Running time: 80 minutes
- Production company: Arc Media

Original release
- Network: KBS2
- Release: September 16, 2023 – March 17, 2024

Live Your Own Life (Korean: 효심이네 각자도생) is a South Korean television series starring Uee, Ha Jun, and Go Joo-won. The series is about a daughter who devoted her whole life to her family, but now has to break away because of the difficulties they cause, and live an independent life. It premiered on KBS2 on September 16, 2023, and aired every Saturday and Sunday at 20:05 (KST).

== Cast and characters ==
=== Main ===
- Uee as Lee Hyo-sim, third sibling, trainer from TS Fitness
- Ha Jun as Kang Tae-ho
- Go Joo-won as Kang Tae-min, heir to Taesan Group

=== Supporting ===
==== Hyo-sim's family ====
- Yoon Mi-ra as Lee Seon-soon, Hyo-sim's mother
- Nam Sung-jin as Lee Hyo-seong, Hyo-sim's older brother
- Lim Ji-eun as Yang Hee-joo, Hyo-seong's wife
- Seo Seol-hwan as Lee Hyo-jun, Hyo-sim's second brother who is preparing for the law exam
- Kim Do-yeon as Lee Hyo-do, Hyo-sim's younger brother
- Lee Ga-yeon as Ruby, Hyo-seong and Hee-joo's eldest daughter
- Lee Joo-won as Lee Phillip, the youngest son of Hyo-seong and Hee-joo

==== Tae-ho's family ====
- Jeong Young-sook as Choi Myung-hee, Tae-ho's grandmother
- Lee Hwi-hyang as Jang Sook-hyang, Jin-beom's wife and Tae-hee's mother
- Noh Yeong-guk (Ep. 1~7) - Kim Kyu-chul (Ep. 8~50) as Kang Jin-beom, the current chairman of Taesan Group, and Sook-hyang's husband
- Lee Kwang-ki as Yeo Jin-su, executive director of Taesan Group
- Kim Bi-joo as Kang Tae-hee, the precious daughter of Taesan Group, and Jang Sook-hyang's daughter

==== Uicheon Villa ====
- Jeon Won-ju as Bang Geun-soon, Uicheon Villa building owner whose children and grandchildren immigrated to the United States
- Park Geun-soo as Park Woo-joo, a golf instructor
- Kim Yu-ha as Park Ga-on, the cutie of Uicheon Villa, and an elementary school student

==== TS Fitness ====
- Kang Shin-jo as Yang Jeon-min
- Rho Sang-bo as Hwang Chi, a dumb trainer
- Lee Ye-sol as Min Ga-young, a trainer
- Jin Tae-hyun as Jang Seon-woo, a trainer
- Yoon Ye-in as a talkative old lady who always comes in first at 6 a.m.
- Choo Eun-kyung as Kang Jeong-suk
- Lee Chun-sik as Hwang No-sik, a grandfather who likes to talk about politics
- Park Ki-sun as Choi In-soo, a current orthopedic surgeon
- Kim Jong-hoon as Choi Mi-nam, a trainer who causes a commotion at TS Fitness because he couldn't distinguish between public and private affairs

==== Others ====
- Nam Bo-ra as Jeong Mi-rim, an aspiring celebrity
- Lim Ju-eun as Choi Sook-yung, daughter of the president and anchor of Korea's best full-length TV live
- Lee Seung-cheol as Chairman Choi, president of TV Live
- Ahn Hong-jin as Park Jong-min, a private loan man
- Lee Ho-jae as Kang Geun-man, Tae-ho's grandfather, and the first chairman of Taesan Group
- Park Hyung-joon as Kang Joon-beom, Tae-ho's father who was so capable during his lifetime that he was likely to be the successor to Taesan, but died in an accident at Daegwallyeong Pass.

=== Extended ===
- Park Yeo-reum as Han So-ra, a nurse
- Kim Mi-ra as Madame Seo, the concubine of Taesan Group's first chairman, Kang Geun-man.

== Production ==
Uee was confirmed as the main lead of the series in April 2023. This is her comeback in a weekend drama of KBS2, as she last appeared five years ago in the 2018 television series My Only One. Go Joo-won also makes a comeback in the series as he last appeared in the 2019 TV series Haechi. The stills from the script-reading site were revealed on September 2, 2023. The supporting cast of the series includes Yoon Mi-ra, Jeong Young-sook, Lee Hwi-hyang, Jeon Won-ju, Noh Yeong-guk, Lee Kwang-ki, Nam Seong-hwan, Seol Seol-hwan, Kim Do-yeon, Nam Bo-ra, and Kim Bi-jo.

=== Music ===
Choi In-hee and Oh Hye-joo composed the music for the series. OST Part.1 of Live Your Own Life, "My Song", sung by Lim Jeong-hee, was released on September 17.

== Original soundtrack ==
Live Your Own Life

Soundtrack album by Various
- Released: 2023
- Genre: Soundtrack
- Languages: Korean; English
- Labels: 2%Entertainment; Daebak Planning

=== Part 1 ===
Released on September 17, 2023
No.	Title	Lyrics	Music	Artist	Length
1.	"My Song" (나의 노래)	Jeong Yu-shin, GRACE H	Seo Jae-ha	Lim Jeong-hee	3:50
2.	"My Song" (나의 노래; Inst.)		Seo Jae-ha		3:50
Total length:					7:40

=== Part 2 ===
Released on September 24, 2023
No.	Title	Lyrics	Music	Artist	Length
1.	"Go Your Own Way" (각자도생)	Young Tak, Ji Kwang-min	Young Tak, Ji Kwang-min	Young Tak	2:55
2.	"Go Your Own Way" (각자도생; Inst.)		Young Tak, Ji Kwang-min		2:55
Total length:					5:50

=== Part 3 ===
Released on December 3, 2023
No.	Title	Lyrics	Music	Artist	Length
1.	"Like a Shining Star Over There" (저기 빛나는 별처럼)	Kim Su-bin (AIMING), Jo Se-hee	Kim Chang-rak (AIMING), Kim Su-bin (AIMING)	Kim Bo-kyung (NEON)	4:16
2.	"Like a Shining Star Over There" (저기 빛나는 별처럼; Inst.)		Kim Chang-rak (AIMING), Kim Su-bin (AIMING)		4:16
Total length:					8:32

=== Part 4 ===
Released on December 17, 2023
No.	Title	Lyrics	Music	Artist	Length
1.	"Like Last Night's Dream" (지난밤의 꿈처럼)	Hanjun	Seo Jae-ha	DK (December)	3:53
2.	"Like Last Night's Dream" (지난밤의 꿈처럼; Inst.)		Seo Jae-ha		3:53
Total length:					7:46

=== Part 5 ===
Released on January 28, 2024
No.	Title	Lyrics	Music	Artist	Length
1.	"I loved you every single day" (너를 하루도 빠짐없이 사랑했었어)	Yanghan tree	Yang Hangru, Tetri Song	Hanbin (4Men)	4:16
2.	"I loved you every single day" (너를 하루도 빠짐없이 사랑했었어; Inst.)		Yang Hangru, Tetri Song		4:16
Total length:					8:32

== Viewership ==
Live Your Own Life : South Korea viewers per episode (millions)

Episodes	Episode number									
Episodes	1	2	3	4	5	6	7	8	9	10
1–10	2.714	3.200	2.739	1.885	2.291	2.402	2.689	2.539	2.978	2.454
11–20	2.560	2.498	2.803	2.583	2.767	2.552	2.696	2.715	2.879	2.765
21–30	2.973	2.746	3.115	2.787	N/A	N/A	N/A	N/A	N/A	3.100
31–40	3.349	3.140	3.763	2.923	3.632	3.252	3.583	3.514	3.710	2.946
41–50	3.443	3.338	3.597	3.105	3.581	3.216	3.811	3.241	3.884	3.408
51	3.862	–								

Source: Audience measurement performed nationwide by Nielsen Korea.

Average TV viewership ratings
Ep.	Original broadcast date	Average audience share		
Ep.	Original broadcast date	Nielsen Korea		TNmS
Ep.	Original broadcast date	Nationwide	Seoul	Nationwide
1	September 16, 2023	16.5% (1st)	14.3% (1st)	14.7% (1st)
2	September 17, 2023	18.4% (1st)	16.7% (1st)	15.9% (1st)
3	September 23, 2023	15.7% (1st)	14.1% (1st)	13.8% (1st)
4	September 30, 2023 (Note: The 4th episode was cancelled for September 24, due to the broadcast of Hangzhou Asian Games.)	11.1% (1st)	10.0% (1st)	8.8% (1st)
5	October 8, 2023 (Note: The 5th episode was cancelled for October 1, and 7 due to the broadcast of Hangzhou Asian Games.)	13.7% (1st)	12.6% (1st)	12.2% (1st)
6	October 14, 2023	14.3% (1st)	12.9% (1st)	12.1% (1st)
7	October 15, 2023	16.8% (1st)	15.7% (1st)	12.4% (1st)
8	October 21, 2023	15.3% (1st)	14.2% (1st)	N/A
9	October 22, 2023	17.0% (1st)	15.7% (1st)	13.3% (1st)
10	October 28, 2023	14.7% (1st)	13.3% (1st)	N/A
11	October 29, 2023	15.4% (1st)	13.7% (1st)	13.6% (1st)
12	November 4, 2023	14.9% (1st)	13.6% (1st)	N/A
13	November 5, 2023	16.8% (1st)	15.5% (1st)	13.8% (1st)
14	November 11, 2023	15.5% (1st)	14.1% (1st)	N/A
15	November 12, 2023	16.6% (1st)	14.6% (1st)	14.2% (1st)
16	November 18, 2023	14.5% (1st)	13.0% (1st)	N/A
17	November 19, 2023	15.5% (1st)	13.9% (1st)	13.4% (1st)
18	November 25, 2023	15.6% (1st)	14.0% (1st)	13.0% (1st)
19	November 26, 2023	17.7% (1st)	16.1% (1st)	13.9% (1st)
20	December 2, 2023	16.6% (1st)	15.1% (1st)	12.3% (1st)
21	December 3, 2023	17.4% (1st)	15.8% (1st)	13.8% (1st)
22	December 9, 2023	16.7% (1st)	15.6% (1st)	N/A
23	December 10, 2023	17.8% (1st)	16.5% (1st)	14.1% (1st)
24	December 16, 2023	16.7% (1st)	14.9% (1st)	N/A
25	December 17, 2023	18.8% (1st)	N/A	16.5% (1st)
26	December 23, 2023	15.8% (1st)	N/A	N/A
27	December 23, 2023	17.5% (1st)	N/A	N/A
28	December 30, 2023	17.6% (1st)	N/A	N/A
29	December 31, 2023	16.2% (1st)	N/A	N/A
30	January 6, 2024	17.5% (1st)	16.3% (1st)	N/A
31	January 7, 2024	19.0% (1st)	17.1% (1st)	N/A
32	January 13, 2024	18.3% (1st)	16.6% (1st)	N/A
33	January 14, 2024	20.9% (1st)	19.3% (1st)	N/A
34	January 20, 2024	17.6% (1st)	16.1% (1st)	N/A
35	January 21, 2024	21.4% (1st)	19.8% (1st)	N/A
36	January 27, 2024	18.6% (1st)	17.5% (1st)	N/A
37	January 28, 2024	20.8% (1st)	18.6% (1st)	N/A
38	February 3, 2024	20.6% (1st)	18.4% (1st)	N/A
39	February 4, 2024	22.1% (1st)	20.3% (1st)	N/A
40	February 10, 2024	16.2% (1st)	14.6% (1st)	N/A
41	February 11, 2024	18.3% (1st)	16.2% (1st)	N/A
42	February 17, 2024	19.3% (1st)	17.8% (2nd)	N/A
43	February 18, 2024	21.1% (1st)	18.6% (1st)	N/A
44	February 24, 2024	18.8% (1st)	16.7% (1st)	N/A
45	February 25, 2024	21.0% (1st)	18.2% (1st)	N/A
46	March 2, 2024	18.8% (1st)	17.0% (1st)	N/A
47	March 3, 2024	22.1% (1st)	20.2% (1st)	N/A
48	March 9, 2024	19.3% (1st)	16.9% (1st)	N/A
49	March 10, 2024	22.1% (1st)	19.9% (1st)	N/A
50	March 16, 2024	19.7% (1st)	17.8% (1st)	N/A
51	March 17, 2024	22.0% (1st)	20.0% (1st)	N/A
Average		17.698%	— (Note: Due to multiple unpublished ratings, the exact average rating is unknown.)	—
In the table above, the blue numbers represent the lowest ratings and the red numbers represent the highest ratings.; N/A denotes rating that was not released.

== Accolades ==
Award ceremony	Year	Category	Nominee	Result	Ref.
APAN Star Awards	2023	Top Excellence Award, Actress in a Serial Drama	Uee	Nominated	
APAN Star Awards	2023	Best Original Soundtrack	Young Tak	Won	
KBS Drama Awards	2023	Top Excellence Award, Actress in a Serial Drama	Uee	Won	
KBS Drama Awards	2023	Excellence Award, Actor in a Serial Drama	Ha Jun	Won	
KBS Drama Awards	2023	Best Couple Award	Ha Jun and Uee	Won	
KBS Drama Awards	2023	Popularity Award, Actor	Uee	Won	
