= Ha Jun =

South Korean actor (born 1987)

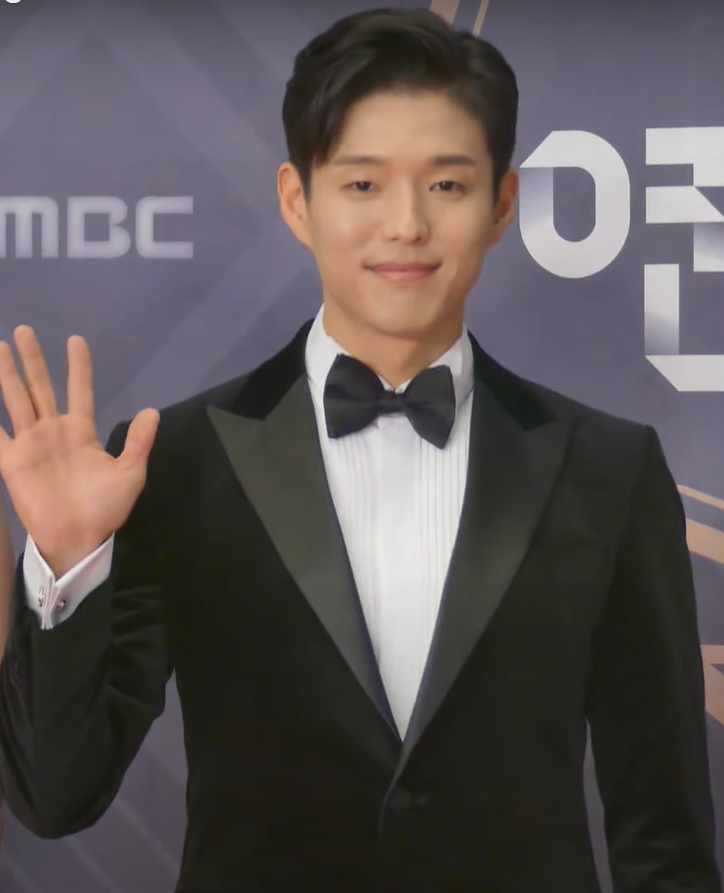
- Ha at 2018 MBC Drama Awards
- Born: April 3, 1987 (age 39); Changwon, South Gyeongsang, South Korea
- Education: Seoul Institute of the Arts – Theater
- Occupation: Actor
- Years active: 2012–present
- Agent: Ace Factory

Korean name
- Hangul: 송준철
- RR: Song Juncheol
- MR: Song Chunch'ŏl

Stage name
- Hangul: 하준
- RR: Ha Jun
- MR: Ha Chun

Ha Jun (born Song Joon-Chul on 3 April 1987), also known by his ex-stage name Song Ha-jun, is a South Korean actor.

== Filmography ==
=== Film ===
Year	Title	Role
2016	The Boys Who Cried Wolf	Kwang-suk
2017	The Outlaws	Kang Hong-seok
2018	On Your Wedding Day	Hwan Seung-hee's groom
2019	Girls' Stories	Han-nam
2020	Festival	Kyung-man
2022	The Roundup	Kang Hong-seok

=== Television series ===
Year	Title	Role	Ref.
2013	Who Are You?	Lee Woo-seok	
2014	Three Days	Presidential guard	
2014	Gap-dong	Na Do-hyung	
2014	Cheongdam-dong Scandal	Dong-bin	
2015	Six Flying Dragons	Ryoo Moon-sang	
2018	Radio Romance	Kim Jun-woo	
2018	Bad Papa	Lee Min-woo	
2019	Arthdal Chronicles	Ta Choo-gan	
2019	Black Dog: Being A Teacher	Do Yeon-woo	
2020	SF8	Tutelar deity (Episode: "Blink")	
2020–2023	Missing: The Other Side	Shin Joon-ho	
2021	High Class	Danny Oh / Oh Soon-sang	
2022	Crazy Love	Oh Se-gi	
2022	Bad Prosecutor	Oh Do-hwan	
2023	Destined With You	Kwon Jae-kyung	
2023–2024	Live Your Own Life	Kang Tae-ho	
2026	Our Universe	Seon Woo-jin (Special appearances)	

== Theater ==
Year	Title	Role	Ref.
2012	Fantasy Couple		

== Accolades ==
=== Awards and nominations ===
Year	Award	Category	Nominated work	Result	Ref.
2018	37th MBC Drama Awards	Excellence Award, Actor in a Monday-Tuesday Miniseries	Bad Papa	Nominated	
2018	37th MBC Drama Awards	Best New Actor	Bad Papa	Nominated	
2021	8th Wildflower Film Awards	Best New Actor	Festival	Nominated	
2021	30th Buil Film Awards	Best New Actor	Festival	Won	
2021	42nd Blue Dragon Film Awards	Best New Actor	Festival	Nominated	
2023	KBS Drama Awards	Excellence Award, Actor in a Serial Drama	Live Your Own Life	Won	
2023	KBS Drama Awards	Popularity Award, Actor	Live Your Own Life	Nominated	
2023	KBS Drama Awards	Best Couple Award with Uee	Live Your Own Life	Won	

=== Listicles ===
Name of publisher, year listed, name of listicle, and placement
Publisher	Year	Listicle	Placement	Ref.
Sports Dong-a	2018	The Star that Will Shine in 2018 (Actor)	Placed (Note: Shortlisted with Dong-ha, Kim Seon-ho, Seo Eun-soo, and Won Jin-ah)	
