= The Tale of Nokdu =

2019 South Korean television series

- Promotional poster
- Also known as: Joseon Rom-com: Mung Bean Chronicles
- Hangul: 조선로코-녹두전
- Hanja: 朝鮮로코-綠豆傳
- Lit.: Joseon Rom-com: Tale of Nok-du
- RR: Joseon roko-Nokdujeon
- MR: Chosŏn rok'o-Noktujŏn
- Genre: Period drama; Romantic comedy
- Based on: Joseon Love Story: The Tale of Nokdu by Hye Jin-yang
- Written by: Baek So-yeon; Lim Ye-jin
- Directed by: Kim Dong-hwi
- Starring: Jang Dong-yoon; Kim So-hyun; Kang Tae-oh; Jung Joon-ho
- Opening theme: "Miracle" by Woozi (Seventeen)
- Ending theme: "I'll Be The Light" by Younha
- Country of origin: South Korea
- Original language: Korean
- No. of episodes: 32

Production
- Camera setup: Single-camera
- Running time: 35 minutes
- Production companies: The Tale of Nokdu Production Partners; Production H; Monster Union
- Budget: ₩10 billion

Original release
- Network: KBS2
- Release: September 30 – November 25, 2019

The Tale of Nokdu (Korean: 조선로코-녹두전) is a 2019 South Korean television series starring Jang Dong-yoon, Kim So-hyun, Kang Tae-oh, and Jung Joon-ho. It is based on the webtoon by Hye Jin-yang which was published in 2014 on Naver Webtoon. It aired on KBS2 from September 30 to November 25, 2019. It is also available for streaming on Viki, Kocowa, Viu, and Netflix in selected regions.

== Synopsis ==
Set in the Joseon period, the series is about a man who disguises as a woman to enter a mysterious women-only village in search of the truth about his birth; and a young woman who does not want to become a kisaeng in pursuit of revenge for her family.

== Cast ==
=== Main ===
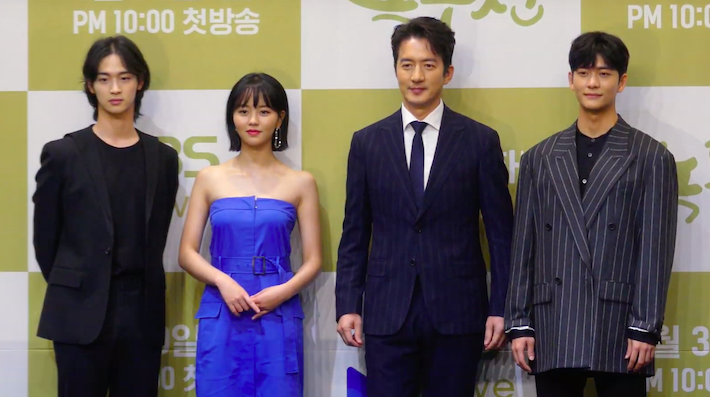
Leads Jang, Kim, Jung and Kang at The Tale of Nokdu's press conference in September 2019.

- Jang Dong-yoon as Jeon Nok-du / Lady Kim Nok-soon / Yeon Soo
  - Kim Ji-woo as young Jeon Nok-du

A smart and athletic man who, due to an incident, enters an all-women village where men are strictly forbidden. To do so, he dresses himself as a woman in the guise of the widowed Lady Kim Nok-soon.

- Kim So-hyun as Dong Dong-joo / Yoo Eun-seo
  - Jo Ye-rin as young Dong Dong-joo / Yoo Eun-seo

A clumsy and hot-tempered kisaeng trainee who has no skills in performing arts, but is an artisan. Wanting to take revenge on the man who wronged her family, she uses her skills in developing a concealed weapon.

- Kang Tae-oh as Prince Neungyang / Cha Yool-moo
  - Jeon Jin-seo as young Prince Neungyang / Cha Yool-moo

The king's nephew who seemingly lives a simple life. He is a man known for his looks and talent in cooking. He cherishes Dong-joo, having been betrothed to her before her family's disgrace. He stages a coup and becomes the next king of Joseon.

- Jung Joon-ho as King Gwanghae

Upon the death of his father and after finding out that he was not the intended successor, he orders the execution of the supporters of his father's will. He jealously guards the throne against possible contenders.

=== Supporting ===
==== People around Jeon Nok-du ====
- Lee Seung-joon as Jung Yoon-jeo, Nok-du and Hwang-tae's father.
- Song Geon-hee as Jeon Hwang-tae / Jung Yi-hyun, Nok-du's older brother.
- Lee Moon-sik as Hwang Jang-gun, a martial art master and soon to be father-in-law of Nokdu.
- Go Geon-han as Yeon Geun, a rich man who manages the widow village and is entangled with Nok-du.
- Park Da-yeon as Hwang Aeng-du, 7 years old daughter of Hwang Jang-gun. She is convinced that her father promised to marry her with Nokdu, so she called Nokdu "honey".

==== People around Cha Yool-moo ====
- Hwang In-youp as Park Dan-ho, Cha Yool-moo's escort warrior with an excellent sword skill. He is ambitious in sword-fighting and very loyal to Yool-moo, willing to even lay down his life if needed to protect him.
- Kim Yi-kyung as Ok-ran, a kisaeng who is jealous of Yool-moo's one-sided devotion towards Dong-joo.

==== People around King Gwanghae ====
- Kim Tae-woo as Heo Yoon, King Gwanghae's most beloved friend and subject.
- Lee Eun-hyung as officer Baek Jong, a man who is silently guarding the king.
- Park Min-jung as Deposed Queen Yu, King Gwanghae's queen consort.
- Oh Ha-nee as Queen Inmok, King Gwanghae's young stepmother or King Seonjo's wife.

==== Kisaengs ====
- Yoon Yoo-sun as Cheon Hae-soo, the head and guardian of the village to protect the kisaeng and the widow village.
- Lee Joo-bin as Mae Hwa-soo, a friend of Dong-joo and the most popular kisaeng with her talent and natural dancing ability.

==== Member of the Virtuous Women Corps (Yeollyeodan) ====
- Yoon Sa-bong as Kang Soon-nyeo
- Hwang Mi-young as Park Bok-nyeo
- Yoon Geum Sun Ah as Lee Mal-nyeon

==== Member of the Muwol Corps (Muwoldan) ====
- Cho Soo-hyang as Kim Ssook, a calm and cautious widow who has impressive sword skills.
- Song Chae-yoon as Min Deul-re, a mysterious person who is following Nokdu and the dandelion.
- Han Ga-rim as No Yeon-boon
- Yang So-min as Ahn Jeong-sook

==== Others ====
- Han Da-sol as Hang-ah, a court lady who falls in love with Nokdu at first sight.
- Kwon Hyuk

=== Special appearances ===
- Park Chul-min as the father-in-law of the escaper and the holder of elephant treasure statue of Ming Dynasty (Ep. 1, 8).
- Lee Ho-jae as the father who threw the stone at the king (Ep .1)
- Jung Yi-rang as the inn owner (Ep.1)

== Production ==
- The first script reading was held in June 2019 at KBS Annex Broadcasting Station in Yeouido, Seoul, South Korea.
- Yeonwoo of Momoland was offered the role of Mae Hwa-soo, but declined due to health concerns.
- The series was filmed in Dongmakgol, Pyeongchang County, Gangwon Province, South Korea from June 1 to August 31, 2019.
- The series suspended its production on July 4, 2019, in wake of actress Jeon Mi-seon's death. She was cast as Cheon Hae-soo.
- On July 18, 2019, it was revealed that lead actress Kim So-hyun suffered a minor injury when she fell off a horse while filming. Filming was canceled and rescheduled after her recovery.
- On August 26, 2019, The Tale of Nokdu, Naver Music and National Gugak Center announced the opening of K-Drama Music Competition Season 3 to select ten songs for the series' original soundtrack. The winner's song will be released as an official soundtrack on various music portals with the prize money of ₩2 million.
- It is the first series produced by Wavve and aired simultaneously on KBS2 and Wavve starting September 30.

== Original soundtrack ==
The Tale of Nokdu OST Special Album

Soundtrack album by Various artists
- Released: November 26, 2019
- Genre: Soundtrack
- Language: Korean
- Labels: NHN Bugs, MOSTCONTENTS

=== Part 1 ===
Released on October 1, 2019
No.	Title	Lyrics	Music	Artist	Length
1.	"Baby Only You"	Park Beom-geun	Park Beom-geun	NCT U (Doyoung, Mark)	3:17
2.	"Baby Only You" (Inst.)		Park Beom-geun		3:17
Total length:					6:34

=== Part 2 ===
Released on October 8, 2019
No.	Title	Lyrics	Music	Artist	Length
1.	"I'll Be The Light" (빛이 되어줄게)	Honey Jar	Honey Jar	Younha	4:11
2.	"I'll Be The Light" (Inst.)		Honey Jar		4:11
Total length:					8:22

=== Part 3 ===
Released on October 15, 2019
No.	Title	Lyrics	Music	Artist	Length
1.	"Miracle"	Zigzag Note, Moon Sang-seon, moonc	Zigzag Note, Moon Sang-seon, moonc	Woozi (Seventeen)	3:39
2.	"Miracle" (Inst.)		Zigzag Note, Moon Sang-seon, moonc		3:39
Total length:					7:18

=== Part 4 ===
Released on October 21, 2019
No.	Title	Lyrics	Music	Artist	Length
1.	"Most Beautiful Days" (가장 완벽한 날들)	Yang Jae-seon, Gaemi	Gaemi	Gummy	4:45
2.	"Most Beautiful Days" (Inst.)		Gaemi		4:45
Total length:					9:30

=== Part 5 ===
Released on October 22, 2019
No.	Title	Lyrics	Music	Artist	Length
1.	"Going Round And Round Inside Me" (내 안에 맴돌아)	Heo Sung-jin, Gaemi	Kim Se-jin	Sandeul (B1A4)	3:36
2.	"Going Round And Round Inside Me" (Inst.)		Kim Se-jin		3:36
Total length:					7:12

=== Part 6 ===
Released on October 29, 2019
No.	Title	Lyrics	Music	Artist	Length
1.	"It Hurts" (아프고 아파서)	Jin Hyo-jeong	Jin Hyo-jeong, Ecobridge	Min Seo	3:34
2.	"It Hurts" (Inst.)		Jin Hyo-jeong, Ecobridge		3:34
Total length:					7:08

=== Part 7 ===
Released on November 5, 2019
No.	Title	Lyrics	Music	Artist	Length
1.	"Scar" (흉터)	GA EUN	Gaemi	Kim Yeon-ji	4:01
2.	"Scar" (Inst.)		Gaemi		4:01
Total length:					8:02

=== Part 8 ===
Released on November 9, 2019
No.	Title	Lyrics	Music	Artist	Length
1.	"Your Warmth" (너의 온기)	Kim Seong-yeon	Jin Min-ho	Huh Gak	4:04
2.	"Your Warmth" (Inst.)		Jin Min-ho		4:04
Total length:					8:08

=== Part 9 ===
Released on November 11, 2019
No.	Title	Lyrics	Music	Artist	Length
1.	"Sunshine Wind Starlight" (햇살 바람 별빛 그대)	Lee Da-hee	Lee Da-hee	Parc Jae Jung	4:01
2.	"Sunshine Wind Starlight" (Inst.)		Lee Da-hee		4:01
Total length:					8:02

=== Part 10 ===
Released on November 11, 2019
No.	Title	Lyrics	Music	Artist	Length
1.	"The Never Ending Melody" (끝나지 않은 이 멜로디)	Rael, Naomi	개미, Ra.L	Kim Na-yeon	3:26
2.	"The Never Ending Melody" (Inst.)		개미, Ra.L		3:26
Total length:					6:52

Disc 2:
No.	Title	Artist	Length
1.	"The Fate From Scars" (흉터로 만든 운명)	개미	1:30
2.	"Escape"	Yoo Min-ho	1:50
3.	"Destined To Be King" (왕이 될 운명)	Park Yun-seo	2:02
4.	"Hardship"	Lee Seong-gu	1:57
5.	"Conspiracy" (역모)	Park Mi-sun	1:32
6.	"Twisted Choice" (엇갈린 선택)	Park Ji-hwan	2:01
7.	"Grey Wind" (잿바람)	Junghwan Park	1:07
8.	"The Day When The Sky Opened" (하늘이 열리는 날)	개미	2:27
9.	"Fate" (운명)	개미	3:08
10.	"Withstand"	Lee Seong-gu	2:00
11.	"Attack" (습격)	Park Mi-sun	1:56
12.	"Swing" (그네터)	Park Mi-sun	3:01
13.	"The Day of the Battle" (결전의 날)	Park Ji-hwan	1:50
14.	"Avoid the Rain" (비를 긋다)	Park Yun-seo	2:48
15.	"Far Away" (멀어진 길)	Park Ji-hwan	2:06
16.	"Sweet Dream" (단꿈)	Lee Geon-yeong	4:14
17.	"Dark Shadow" (검은 그림자)	Park Ji-hwan	2:42
18.	"Perfect Days" (완벽한 날들)	개미	4:19
19.	"Shoes with Flowers" (꽃신)	Park Yun-seo	4:16
20.	"First Love"	Yoo Min-ho	2:26
21.	"Light Tread" (가벼운 발걸음)	Lee Seong-gu	2:45
22.	"Flower Shaped Rice Cake" (꽃전)	Park Mi-sun	1:47
23.	"Village of Widows" (과부촌)	Yoo Min-ho	1:47
24.	"Fairytale"	Lee Geon-yeong	2:38
25.	"Widow Kim" (김과부)	Yoo Min-ho	2:05
26.	"A Widow Need Lots of Hand" (손이 많이 가는 과부님)	Park Mi-sun	2:27
27.	"The Flower's Way" (꽃길)	Dear Island	2:45

== Reception ==
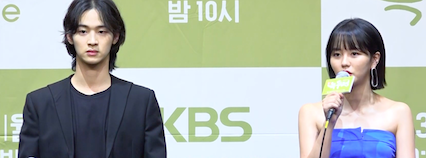
Jang Dong-yoon & Kim So-hyun at The Tale of Nokdu's conference.

The series had a strong opening week for KBS2's Monday-Tuesday 22:00 time slot with ratings ranging from 6-8% that was last achieved by Sweet Stranger and Me back in 2016. It was announced on October 2 that due to "The Tale of Nokdu effect", Wavve has increased 4.5 times in paid subscribers daily and peak-time traffic rose more than 30% due to service reorganization, wave marketing and monopoly contents after launching a month before the drama aired. In addition, the drama reached 8.8% of the total viewing time of domestic dramas provided by Wavve considering it provides both latest and old series.

Jang Dong-yoon saddled to a difficult task in transforming himself into a woman by growing out his hair and going on a severe diet to be able to pass as a woman in hanbok received praises from the viewers. He and Kim So-hyun were donned the nickname "Manhwa tearing" chemistry by the viewers for capturing everything from laughter to excitement and adding their own colors to the original characters.

According to the Content Power Index, The Tale of Nokdu was ranked second in both drama and non-drama and first in the drama category. In addition, according to the Good Data Corporation survey, the series was ranked third place in online video consumption of currently airing and upcoming dramas, and Jang Dong-yoon and Kim So-hyun were ranked third and fifth respectively in the list of top 10 most talked about actors and actresses in South Korea. As of 4th Week of November, the drama ended topped on the list of top 10 most talked about dramas.

SeoulBeats gave the drama a positive review, saying: "...cannot be defined by a single genre. The ability of the drama to experiment with various genres at once is due in large part to the complex character motives, desires, and relationships that drive the plot." Although mild, The Tale of Nokdu indirectly demonstrates the great abilities of women from special bodyguards, female assassins to a community of widows. Moon Soo-yeon of The Fact praised Jang dong-yoon, Kim So-hyun and Kang Tae-oh's acting performance to the ever-changing atmosphere in a work where the elements of comic, melo, action, and traditional historical drama were properly harmonized. Sarah Kim, SVP of content and partnerships at Rakuten Viki stated that "It was good to have a cross-dressing drama, which has not been produced since Coffee Prince."

The Tale of Nokdu ranked 15th on 2019 Wavve Chart. According to a survey conducted by SBS, the series ranked 5th among the Korean dramas in 2019.

== Viewership ==
The Tale of Nokdu : South Korea viewers per episode (thousands)

Episodes	Episode number															
Episodes	1	2	3	4	5	6	7	8	9	10	11	12	13	14	15	16
1–16	946	1165	1018	1308	860	1153	981	1174	859	1109	835	1081	928	979	924	1328
17–32	1128	1424	899	1172	917	1144	1041	1312	1014	1349	1098	1295	1222	1423	1095	1300

Source: Audience measurement performed nationwide by Nielsen Korea.

Ep.	Original broadcast date	Average audience share		
Ep.	Original broadcast date	Nielsen Korea		TNmS
Ep.	Original broadcast date	Nationwide	Seoul	Nationwide
1	September 30, 2019	5.6% (14th)	5.0% (17th)	6.2% (15th)
2	September 30, 2019	7.1% (8th)	6.3% (9th)	8.0% (10th)
3	October 1, 2019	6.5% (11th)	6.4% (11th)	6.1% (14th)
4	October 1, 2019	8.3% (5th)	8.2% (5th)	7.3% (11th)
5	October 7, 2019	5.4% (17th)	5.3% (19th)	5.8% (15th)
6	October 7, 2019	7.1% (10th)	6.9% (10th)	7.3% (13th)
7	October 8, 2019	5.8% 16th)	5.5% 16th)	5.0% (20th)
8	October 8, 2019	6.7% (11th)	6.5% (12th)	6.3% (12th)
9	October 15, 2019 (Note: On October 14, regular broadcasting of the drama was cancelled due to the delay of 2019 KBO League season Play-Off Game Kiwoom Heroes vs SK Wyverns.)	5.0% (17th)	N/A	
10	October 15, 2019	6.6% (12th)	6.5% (11th)	5.4% (14th)
11	October 21, 2019	4.3% (NR)	N/A	
12	October 21, 2019	5.9% (14th)	5.6% (16th)	5.5% (19th)
13	October 22, 2019 (Note: On October 22, regular broadcasting of the drama began broadcasting 40 minutes later than usual after 2019 KBO League season Kiwoom Heroes vs Doosan Bears.)	6.0% (15th)	6.1% (15th)	N/A
14	October 22, 2019	6.2% (13th)	6.3% (12th)	5.7% (15th)
15	October 28, 2019	4.9% (NR)	N/A	4.7% (NR)
16	October 28, 2019	7.3% (11th)	6.9% (13th)	5.9% (19th)
17	October 29, 2019	6.0% (16th)	5.7% (16th)	N/A
18	October 29, 2019	7.4% (8th)	7.4% (8th)	6.3% (15th)
19	November 4, 2019	4.6% (NR)	N/A	
20	November 4, 2019	6.4% (14th)	6.3% (16th)	6.2% (16th)
21	November 5, 2019	4.7% (NR)	N/A	
22	November 5, 2019	6.2% (12th)	6.0% (15th)	5.5% (17th)
23	November 11, 2019	5.1% (18th)	5.1% (19th)	5.5% (17th)
24	November 11, 2019	6.9% (11th)	7.0% (12th)	6.4% (14th)
25	November 12, 2019	5.4% (15th)	5.2% (15th)	5.7% (15th)
26	November 12, 2019	7.7% (6th)	7.4% (5th)	7.0% (10th)
27	November 18, 2019	5.6% (20th)	5.9% (19th)	N/A
28	November 18, 2019	6.5% (14th)	6.5% (13th)	6.3% (16th)
29	November 19, 2019	6.3% (12th)	6.2% (14th)	5.9% (18th)
30	November 19, 2019	7.8% (9th)	8.0% (7th)	6.9% (13th)
31	November 25, 2019	6.0% (17th)	N/A	
32	November 25, 2019	7.3% (11th)	6.4% (15th)	6.5% (16th)
Average		6.2%	— (Note: Due to some unpublished ratings, the exact average rating is unknown.)	—
In the table above, the blue numbers represent the lowest ratings and the red numbers represent the highest ratings.; NR denotes that the drama did not rank in the top 20 daily programs on that date.; N/A denotes that the rating is not known.

== Awards and nominations ==
Year	Award	Category	Recipient	Result	Ref.
2019	KBS Drama Awards	Excellence Award, Actor in a Miniseries	Jang Dong-yoon	Won	
2019	KBS Drama Awards	Excellence Award, Actress in a Miniseries	Kim So-hyun	Won	
2019	KBS Drama Awards	Best Supporting Actor	Jung Joon-ho	Nominated	
2019	KBS Drama Awards	Best Young Actress	Park Da-Yeon	Won	
2019	KBS Drama Awards	Best New Actor	Kang Tae-oh	Won	
2019	KBS Drama Awards	Netizen Award	Jang Dong-yoon	Nominated	
2019	KBS Drama Awards	Netizen Award	Kang Tae-oh	Nominated	
2019	KBS Drama Awards	Netizen Award	Kim So-hyun	Nominated	
2019	KBS Drama Awards	Best Couple	Jang Dong-yoon and Kim So-hyun	Won	
2019	KBS Drama Awards	Best Couple	Jang Dong-yoon and Kang Tae-oh	Nominated	
2020	7th APAN Star Awards	Popular Star Award, Actor	Jang Dong-yoon	Nominated	
2020	7th APAN Star Awards	Best New Actor	Jang Dong-yoon	Won	
