= My Man Is Cupid =

2023–2024 South Korean web series

- Promotional poster
- Hangul: 내 남자는 큐피드
- RR: Nae namjaneun Kyupideu
- MR: Nae namjanŭn K'yup'idŭ
- Genre: Fantasy; Romantic comedy
- Written by: Heo Sung-hee
- Directed by: Nam Tae-jin
- Starring: Jang Dong-yoon; Nana; Park Ki-woong
- Country of origin: South Korea
- Original language: Korean
- No. of episodes: 16

Production
- Producer: Moon Bo-mi
- Running time: 60 minutes
- Production company: HB Entertainment

Original release
- Network: Amazon Prime Video
- Release: December 1, 2023 – January 20, 2024

My Man Is Cupid (Korean: 내 남자는 큐피드) is a South Korean television series written by Heo Sung-hee, directed by Nam Tae-jin, produced by Moon Bo-mi under HB Entertainment, and starring Jang Dong-yoon, Nana, and Park Ki-woong. It is an Amazon Prime Video Original and premiered new episodes from December 1, 2023, to January 20, 2024, every Friday and Saturday.

== Cast ==
=== Main ===
- Jang Dong-yoon as Cheon Sang-hyuk
- Nana as Oh Baek-ryun
- Park Ki-woong as Seo Jae-hee

=== Supporting ===
- Moon Ji-hoo as Dong-chil
- Eom Se-ung as Dong-pal
- Park Myung-hoon as Dong-gu
- Gong Min-jeung as An Do-ra
- Moon Ye-jin as Yoon Si-ah
- Kwon Ah-reum as So-hee
- Kim Do-ah as Jeong-ah
- Nam Mi-jung as Ham Yeon-ja
- Han So-hyun as Mi-ja
- Seo Woo-jin as Elementary school student

== Production ==
The series was announced by Amazon Prime Video consisting of sixteen episodes. The principal photography of the series commenced in 2022, with Jang Dong-yoon and Nana joining the cast. The trailer of the series was released on November 22, 2023, on YouTube.

== Viewership ==
Based on Flixpatrol data, the series collected the highest score of 198 points and entered Top 7 Worldwide in Amazon Prime on January 21, 2024. It also ranked at number 9 worldwide with 192 points on Dec 31, 2023.
