= Seol In-ah =

South Korean actress (born 1996)

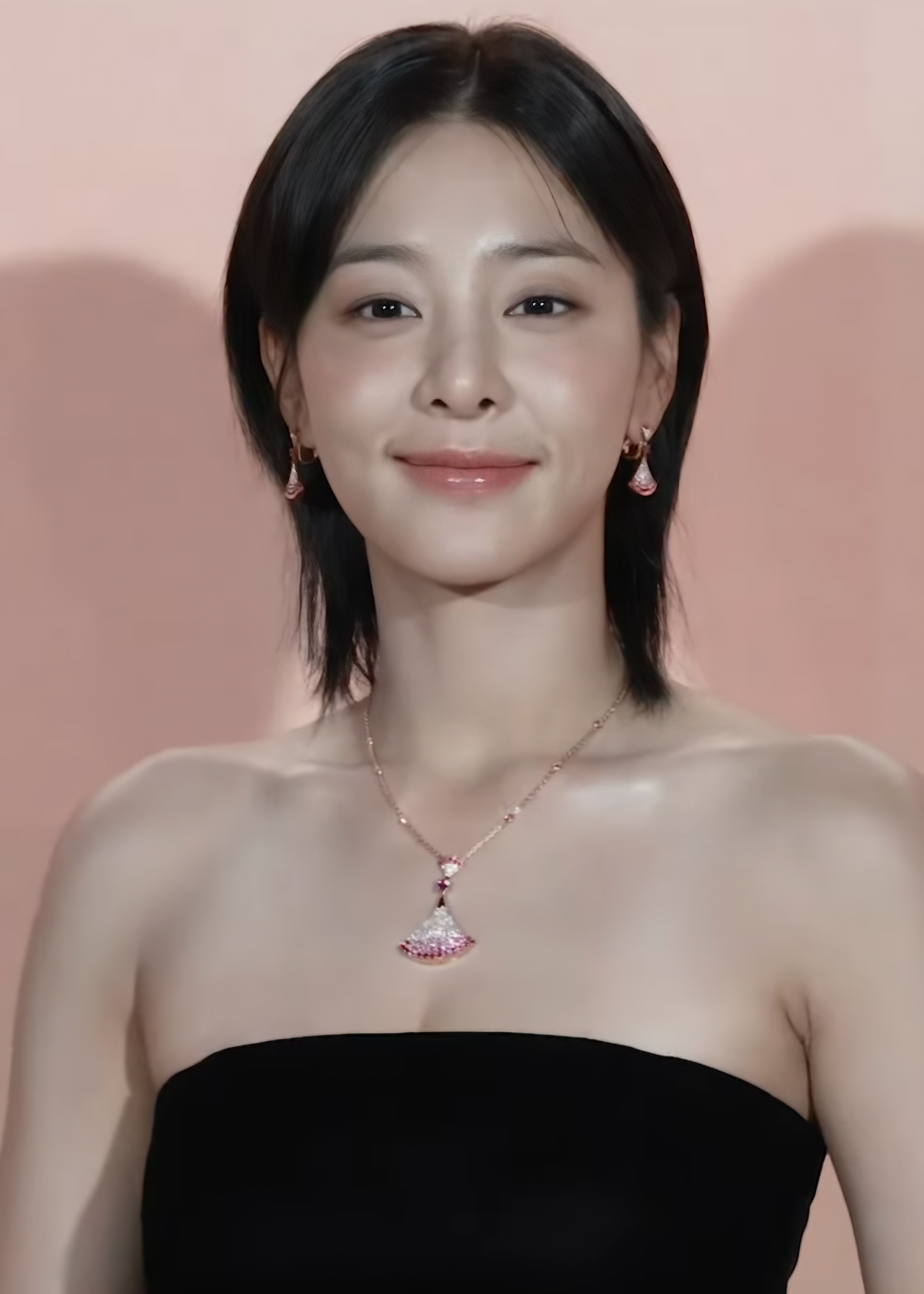
- Seol in September 2024
- Born: Bang Ye-rin; January 3, 1996 (age 30); Suwon, South Korea
- Other name: Seorina
- Education: Seoul Institute of the Arts
- Occupation: Actress
- Years active: 2015–present
- Agent: Goldmedalist

Korean name
- Hangul: 방예린
- RR: Bang Yerin
- MR: Pang Yerin

Stage name
- Hangul: 설인아
- RR: Seol Ina
- MR: Sŏl Ina
- Website: goldmedalist.com

Signature
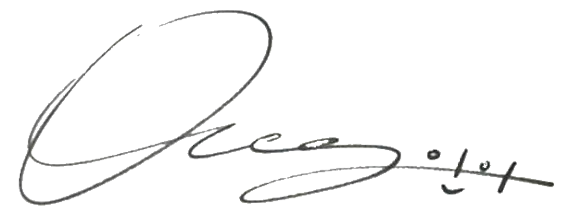

Bang Ye-rin (Korean: 방예린; born January 3, 1996), better known by the stage name Seol In-ah (설인아), is a South Korean actress. Seol is best known for her leading roles in television series Sunny Again Tomorrow (2018), Beautiful Love, Wonderful Life (2019), Business Proposal (2022), and Twinkling Watermelon (2023) and for her supporting roles in Strong Girl Bong-soon (2017), School 2017 (2017), and Mr. Queen (2020–2021).

== Early life and education ==
Seol was born in Suwon, South Korea. Seol attended Seoul Institute of the Arts where she majored in acting.

== Career ==
=== 2015–2016: Early career ===
Seol made her acting debut in 2015, where she played a minor role in The Producers and Flowers of the Prison in 2016.

=== 2017–present: Rising popularity and leading role ===
She first gained recognition for playing the supporting role in JTBC's drama, Strong Girl Bong-soon and KBS2' drama School 2017. She also made her film debut in a web film titled, Closed Eyes. She was also a host of MBC's Section TV from 2017 to 2019.

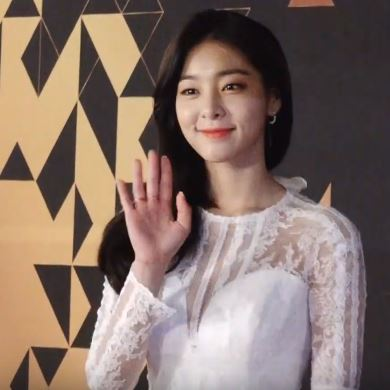
Seol in 2018

In 2018, Seol took on her first lead role in Sunny Again Tomorrow, which earned her the Best New Actress Award at the 2018 KBS Drama Awards. Her second full variety show came soon after, as a fixed cast member of Law of the Jungle in Mexico. She also played a supporting character in the drama Special Labor Inspector in 2019.

Seol played Kim Cheong-Ah in her second leading role in the weekend drama Beautiful Love, Wonderful Life, which ran from September 2019 to March 2020. She received the Excellence Award for Actress in a Serial Drama at the 2019 KBS Drama Awards for her role in the drama.

In 2020, Seol made a special appearance in the tvN drama Record of Youth. Later the same year, she played Jo Hwa-jin (Royal Noble Consort Ui) in historical drama Mr. Queen.

In 2022, Seol starred in the SBS romantic comedy drama Business Proposal as Jin Young-seo. In April 2022, it was reported that her contract with Oui has expired and she decided not to renew it. Later, she signed with Gold Medalist. She released her first ever solo single, "Pure Love", in collaboration with the vegan brand Marhen J. The single accompanied with the music video was released on July 8. In August, Seol made her big screen debut in the film Emergency Declaration as Tae Eun, a flight attendant.

== Filmography ==
=== Film ===
| Year | Title | Role | Notes | Ref. |
|---|---|---|---|---|
| 2017 | Closed Eyes | Park Mi-rim | Web film | |
| 2022 | Emergency Declaration | Tae-eun | | |
| 2023 | Love My Scent | A-ra | | |

=== Television series ===
| Year | Title | Role | Notes | Ref. |
|---|---|---|---|---|
| 2015 | The Producers | Cindy's anti-fan | Cameo (Episode 10) | |
| 2016 | Flowers of the Prison | Court Lady Han | Cameo | |
| 2017 | Strong Girl Bong-soon | Jo Hee-ji | | |
| 2017 | School 2017 | Hong Nam-joo | | |
| 2018 | Sunny Again Tomorrow | Kang Ha-nui / Han Soo-jeong | | |
| 2019 | Special Labor Inspector | Go Mal-sook | | |
| 2019–2020 | Beautiful Love, Wonderful Life | Kim Cheong-ah | | |
| 2020 | Record of Youth | Jung Ji-ah | Cameo (Episode 4, 7–15) | |
| 2020–2021 | Mr. Queen | Jo Hwa-jin | | |
| 2022 | Business Proposal | Jin Young-seo | | |
| 2023 | Oasis | Oh Jung-shin | | |
| 2023 | Twinkling Watermelon | Choi Se-gyeong / On Eun-yoo | | |
| 2023 | Celebrity | Song Yeon-woo | Cameo (Ep. 4) | |
| 2025 | Oh My Ghost Clients | Na Hee-joo | | |
| 2026 | Love in Disguise | Kang Jae-hee | | |

=== Television shows ===
| Year | Title | Role | Notes | Ref. |
|---|---|---|---|---|
| 2015 | A Look at Myself | Hidden Camera Agent | | |
| 2017–2019 | Section TV | Host | | |
| 2018 | Law of the Jungle in Mexico | Cast member | Episodes 314–320 | |
| 2019 | Paik's Mysterious Kitchen | Challenger | Episode 1 | |
| 2021 | Law of the Jungle – Pent Island: Island of Desire | Cast member | Episodes 451–452 | |
| 2022 | Hope TV | Host | episode 5–6 | |
| 2024–2026 | Iron Girls | Cast member | Season 1–3 | |

=== Hosting ===
| Year | Title | Notes | Ref. |
|---|---|---|---|
| 2017 | Seoul Music Awards | with MC Ding Dong (Red carpet) | |
| 2017 | The Seoul Awards | with Yang Se-chan (Red carpet) | |
| 2018 | Dream Concert | with Yoon Shi-yoon and Cha Eun-woo | |
| 2022 | 2022 KBS Entertainment Awards | with Moon Se-yoon and Kang Chan-hee | |
| 2023 | 2023 KBS Drama Awards | with Jang Sung-kyu and Rowoon | |

== Discography ==
=== Singles ===
| Title | Year | Album | Ref. |
|---|---|---|---|
| "Pure Love" (예쁘니까) | 2022 | Commercial Song | |
| "You Don't Have to Say Anything" (말하지 않아도 알아요 설인아) | 2023 | Umbrella | |
| "Lady in the Rainy Night" (여우야) (with The Classic) | 2024 | Non-album single | |
| "A Race" (달리기) (with Cha Hak-yeon) | 2025 | Oh My Ghost Clients OST Part 4 | |

== Awards and nominations ==
Name of the award ceremony, year presented, category, nominee of the award, and the result of the nomination
| Award ceremony | Year | Category | Nominee / Work | Result | Ref. |
|---|---|---|---|---|---|
| APAN Star Awards | 2021 | Excellence Award, Actress in Serial Drama | Beautiful Love, Wonderful Life | Nominated | |
| Baeksang Arts Awards | 2019 | Best New Actress – Television | Sunny Again Tomorrow | Nominated | |
| Baeksang Arts Awards | 2026 | Best Female Variety Performer | Seol In-ah | Nominated | |
| Brand of the Year Awards | 2022 | Rising Star Actress | Seol In-ah | Won | |
| KBS Drama Awards | 2018 | Best New Actress | Sunny Again Tomorrow | Won | |
| KBS Drama Awards | 2019 | Excellence Award, Actress in a Serial Drama | Beautiful Love, Wonderful Life | Won | |
| KBS Drama Awards | 2019 | Netizen Award, Actress | Beautiful Love, Wonderful Life | Nominated | |
| KBS Drama Awards | 2019 | Best Couple Award | Seol In-ah (with Kim Jae-young); Beautiful Love, Wonderful Life | Nominated | |
| KBS Drama Awards | 2023 | Excellence Award, Actress in a Miniseries | Oasis | Won | |
| KBS Drama Awards | 2023 | Popularity Award, Actress | Oasis | Won | |
| KBS Drama Awards | 2023 | Best Couple Award | Seol In-ah (with Jang Dong-yoon); Oasis | Won | |
| Korea First Brand Awards | 2026 | Female Multi-entertainer | Seol In-ah | Won | |
| MBC Drama Awards | 2019 | Best Supporting Cast in Monday-Tuesday Miniseries | Special Labor Inspector | Nominated | |
| MBC Entertainment Awards | 2017 | Female Rookie Award in Show/Sitcom Category | Section TV | Won | |
| SBS Drama Awards | 2022 | Best Couple | Seol In-ah (with Kim Min-kyu); Business Proposal | Won | |
| SBS Drama Awards | 2022 | Excellence Award, Actress in a Miniseries Romance/Comedy Drama | Business Proposal | Nominated | |
