= If We Were a Season =

- KBS Drama Special episode
- Episode no.: Season 8 Episode 1
- Directed by: Kang Su-yeon
- Written by: Lim Ye-jin
- Original air date: September 3, 2017
- Running time: 77 minutes

Episode chronology
← Previous "Pinocchio's Nose"	Next → "Let Us Meet"

"If We Were a Season" (Korean: 우리가 계절이라면) is the first episode of the eighth season of the South Korean anthology series KBS Drama Special. Starring Chae Soo-bin, Jang Dong-yoon and Jinyoung, it aired on KBS2 on September 3, 2017.

== Synopsis ==
The special focuses on two High School seniors, who are next door neighbors and who have been friends since birth. Their relationship is very close but becomes strained and distant due to a variety of changes (a new student gets between them, unrequited feelings, difficult relationships with their parents) as they try to prepare for the next chapter of their lives.

== Cast ==
- Chae Soo-bin as Yoon Hae-rim
- Jang Dong-yoon as Uhm Gi-seok
- Jung Jin-young as Oh Dong-kyeong
- Lee Jun-hyeok as Lee Joon-hyeok
- Jung In-gi as Yoon Gi-hyeon
- Go Geon-han as Lee Jung-ho
- Ahn Seung-gyun as Seo Min-joon
- Nam Gi-ae as Kim Mi-hee
