= Love My Scent =

2023 South Korean romantic comedy film

- Promotional poster
- Hangul: 우리 사랑이 향기로 남을 때
- RR: Uri sarangi hyanggiro nameul ttae
- MR: Uri sarangi hyanggiro namŭl ttae
- Directed by: Lim Sung-yong
- Starring: Yoon Shi-yoon; Seol In-ah
- Cinematography: Mun Yong-sik
- Music by: Park Seok-won
- Production companies: Goblin Media; Contents Zone
- Distributed by: Contents Zone; DaseinSoft
- Release date: February 8, 2023
- Running time: 108 minutes
- Country: South Korea
- Language: Korean
- Box office: est. US$88,296

Love My Scent (Korean: 우리 사랑이 향기로 남을 때) is a 2023 South Korean romantic comedy film written and directed by Lim Sung-yong. Starring Yoon Shi-yoon and Seol In-ah, the film depicts the romance of a man who does not like work or dating, and a woman, who has everything but a relationship. A magical romance begins when a scent of a perfume made them fall in love. It was released theatrically in South Korea on February 8, 2023.

== Cast ==
- Yoon Shi-yoon as Chang-soo
- Seol In-ah as A-ra
- Noh Sang-hyun as James
- Kim Young-woong as Na Jeom-jang
- Kim Soo-mi

== Production ==
Yoon Shi-yoon and Seol In-ah were cast in the film in September 2021. They are working together for the first time under director Lim Seong-yong.

Principal photography began in September 2021.

== Release and reception ==
The film was released theatrically on 173 screens on February 8, 2023.

As of February 23, 2023, with gross of US$88,296 and 12,252 admissions, it is at the 16th place among Korean films released in 2023.
