= Project Wolf Hunting =

2022 South Korean film

- Theatrical release poster
- Hangul: 늑대사냥
- Lit.: Project Wolf Hunt
- RR: Neukdae sanyang
- MR: Nŭktae sanyang
- Directed by: Kim Hong-seon
- Screenplay by: Kim Hong-seon
- Starring: Seo In-guk; Jang Dong-yoon; Choi Gwi-hwa; Park Ho-san; Jung So-min; Ko Chang-seok; Jang Young-nam; Sung Dong-il
- Cinematography: Yoon Ju-hwan
- Edited by: Shin Min-kyung; Lee Ga-ram
- Music by: Kim Jun-sung; Jo Ran
- Production companies: Contents G Cheum Film
- Distributed by: The Contents ON
- Release dates: September 16, 2022 (Toronto); September 21, 2022 (South Korea)
- Running time: 112 minutes
- Country: South Korea
- Language: Korean
- Budget: ₩12 billion; (est. $9.1 million)
- Box office: $3.9 million

Project Wolf Hunting (Korean: 늑대사냥; RR: Neukdae sanyang; lit. 'Wolf Hunt') is a 2022 South Korean science fiction action horror film directed by Kim Hong-sun, starring Seo In-guk and Jang Dong-yoon. The film takes place on a cargo ship used to transport dangerous criminals from Manila, Philippines to Busan, South Korea. It premiered in the Midnight Madness section at the 47th Toronto International Film Festival on September 16, 2022, and was released in South Korean theaters on September 21, 2022.

== Synopsis ==
The film opens in 2017 with the extraction of 47 Korean criminals from the Philippines, which turns chaotic when an elderly man detonates a bomb, killing seven officers and wounding about 30 travelers. Five years later, a similar group of criminals is transported via cargo ship to Korea to prevent a repeat of the previous incident.

After the detectives walk the prisoners onto the ship, the Busan VTS (Vessel Tracking Services) has been given orders to track the ship while it makes its trip to South Korea.

Onboard the ship, law enforcement led by Lee Seok-woo confronts the criminals. A confrontation with Lee Do-il (Tattoo), a tattooed criminal, escalates into violence, triggering a brutal beating. Meanwhile, Lee Seok-woo (Doctor) aboard the ship loads a bag full of syringes and other medical equipment under the guise of food. He makes his way down into the ship, where two men monitor vitals and guard a man in a prison jumpsuit with a breathing apparatus. The doctor hands the medical equipment over and administers the sedative to the prisoner.

Chaos ensues as the ship sets sail. Shady and his men, under Tattoo's control, launch a violent spree, while Tattoo's gang picks the locks to their handcuffs to set themselves free.

A series of brutal killings reveals the presence of Alpha, a superhuman with extraordinary strength and resilience. Alpha's origin is linked to disturbing experiments during World War II. Tattoo's gang tries to escape Alpha's wrath but faces annihilation.

Alpha goes on a relentless rampage, confronting Park Jong-doo and his team. A fierce battle ensues, resulting in Cop Leader's demise.

The film delves into Alpha's history, revealing his transformation due to inhumane experiments. Alpha pursues Lee Da-yeon and Go Kun-bae in a tense showdown.

In the climax, Kyung-ho (Commander) arrives, revealing his superhuman strength and history with Lee. A battle between Lee and Kyung-ho ensues. Alpha confronts super soldiers brought by Commander. A final confrontation unfolds between Lee and Commander, with a shocking revelation about Commander's past actions that cost the life of Lee's wife and child. Turns out Lee was a gangster taking down in a gang war only to be saved and experimented on, by Kyung-ho, with other members, which no one survives except for a few exceptions, including Lee. Meanwhile, the doctor attempts to escape to only being killed by one of Kyung-ho's team members.

The film concludes with Lee's victory over Commander, washing up in Korea. It is later shown that Kyung-ho did not kill Lee's child because the superhuman gene had shown to be passed down.

== Cast ==
- Seo In-guk as Park Jong-doo (Hepburn: Park Jongdod)
- Jang Dong-yoon as Lee Do-il
- Choi Gwi-hwa as Alpha
- Sung Dong-il as Oh Dae-woong
- Park Ho-san as Lee Seok-woo
- Jung So-min as Lee Da-yeon
- Ko Chang-seok as Go Kun-bae
- Jang Young-nam as Choi Myeong-ju
- Son Jong-hak as Soo-cheol
- Lee Sung-wook as Kyung-ho
- Hong Ji-yoon as Song Ji-eun
- Jung Moon-sung as Kyu-tae
- Lim Ju-hwan as Representative director
- Kwon Soo-hyun as Jin Kang-woo
- Jung Sung-il as Detective Jung Pil-sung
- Kim Kang-hoon as Lee Do-il's son
- Lee Hong-nae as Piercing
- Shin Seung-hwan as Mantis

== Production ==
On April 14, 2022, it was reported that the filming had ended.

== Release ==
The film had its world premiere in the Midnight Madness section at the 47th Toronto International Film Festival on September 16, 2022. It was released in South Korean theaters on September 21, 2022 by The Contents On, and had a limited release in North America by Well Go USA Entertainment on October 7. Finecut acquired international distribution rights for the film. The film's rights were sold in 41 countries. It was released on VOD by Well Go USA Video on May 31, 2023.

== Reception ==
=== Box office ===
Project Wolf Hunting grossed $20,541 in North America, and $3.8 million in other territories for a worldwide total of $3.9 million, against a production budget of about $9.1 million.

=== Critical response ===
On Rotten Tomatoes, the film has an approval rating of 88% based on 49 reviews and an average rating of 7/10. The site's critical consensus reads, "Project Wolf Hunting's slight story takes a back seat to all the action -- and for fans of all-out cinematic mayhem, that's exactly as it should be." Metacritic, which uses a weighted average, assigned a score of 53 out of 100 based on 8 critics, indicating "mixed or average reviews".

== Accolades ==
Award	Year	Category	Recipient(s)	Result	Ref.
Baeksang Arts Awards	2023	Best New Actor	Seo In-guk	Nominated	
Sitges International Fantastic Film Festival	2022	Special Jury Award	Kim Hong-sun	Won	
Sitges International Fantastic Film Festival	2022	Best special, visual or makeup effects	Project Wolf Hunting	Won	
The 6th Canary Islands Fantastic Film Festival Ciudad de La Laguna, Isla Calavera	2022	Best Feature Film	Project Wolf Hunting	Won	
