= Joseon Exorcist =

2021 South Korean historical-supernatural TV series

- Promotional poster
- Hangul: 조선구마사
- Hanja: 朝鮮驅魔師
- RR: Joseon gumasa
- MR: Chosŏn kumasa
- Genre: Alternate History; Supernatural
- Created by: StudioS (SBS)
- Written by: Park Gye-ok
- Directed by: Shin Kyung-soo
- Starring: Jang Dong-yoon; Park Sung-hoon; Kam Woo-sung
- Country of origin: South Korea
- Original language: Korean
- No. of episodes: 2 (cancelled)

Production
- Executive producer: Hong Sung-chang (SBS)
- Running time: 60 minutes
- Production companies: Crave Works; YG Studioplex; Lotte Cultureworks

Original release
- Network: SBS TV
- Release: March 22 – March 23, 2021

Joseon Exorcist (Korean: 조선구마사) is a South Korean historical-supernatural horror television series. The series, directed by Shin Kyung-soo and written by Park Gye-ok, stars Jang Dong-yoon, Park Sung-hoon and Kam Woo-sung. The series follows the fight of the royal family to protect people from the evil spirits, who use human frailties to demolish Joseon. The first two episodes aired on SBS TV on March 22 and 23, 2021, at 22:00 (KST) before being canceled due to historical inaccuracies and Chinese props present in the series that resulted in backlash from many Korean viewers.

== Synopsis ==
The series follows the story of King Taejong and his two sons, Prince Chungnyung and Prince Yangnyeong, how they fight the evil spirits who came alive and must be exorcised to save Joseon. The founding rulers of Joseon have taken help of the demons and the monsters to overthrow Goryeo. Later the undead return to target the royal family.

== Cast ==
=== Main ===
- Jang Dong-yoon as Prince Chungnyung
- Park Sung-hoon as Prince Yangnyeong
  - Hong Dong-young as young Prince Yangnyeong
- Kam Woo-sung as King Taejong
- Kim Dong-jun as Byeo Ri
- Jung Hye-sung as Moo Hwa, a shaman
- Lee Yu-bi as Eo-ri, a woman who's loved by the crown prince
- Keum Sae-rok as Hye-yoom, Byeo-ri's co-worker
- Seo Young-hee as Queen Wongyeong

=== Supporting ===
- Min Jin-woong as Ing-choon, a rope walker who works with Byeo-ri and Hye-yoom
- Min Sung-wook as Park Seo-bang
- Moon Woo-jin as Grand Prince Kang-nyeong
- Hong Woo-jin as Hong Seok-joong, guardian of King Taejong
- Han Kyu-won as Hong Min-je
- Oh Eui-shik as Ji Gyeom
- Noh Haeng-ha as Yeon-ha
- Baek Eun-hye as Minister Ha's daughter-in-law
- Seo Dong-won as Marco, an interpreter
- Jeon Seung-hun
- Park Seo-yeon as Chae Yi
- Darcy Paquet as Father John (Yohan)
- David Lee McInnis as Father Nicholas

=== Special appearances ===
- Park Hyuk-kwon
- Choi Moo-sung as Mak-chi
- Joo Suk-Tae
- Kim Beop-Rae as Wang Yoo

== Production ==
=== Casting ===
In April 2020, it was announced that Jang Dong-yoon would star in the series. In September 2020, he was joined by Park Sung-hoon, Kim Dong-jun, Jung Hye-sung, and Lee Yu-bi. In November 2020, Kam Woo-sung officially joined the main cast. The final lineup was confirmed the same month.

=== Filming ===
On November 23, 2020, filming was halted after it was reported that a member of the cast tested positive for COVID-19. Leading actors self-isolated for precaution. Jang Dong-yoon was injured after falling off a horse while filming on December 29. On February 26, 2021 it was reported that Lee Yu-bi injured her ligament while shooting for the drama.

=== Controversy and cancellation ===
After the airing of the first two episodes, many viewers criticized the content of the series for historical inaccuracies. Korean and Chinese viewers were angered over the usage of Chinese-style props for a show set during the Joseon dynasty. A scene in the first episode depicted King Taejong slaughtering innocent villagers after having a hallucination of his deceased father, King Taejo. There was no historical basis for such an incident. And Prince Chungnyung (Sejong the Great) is treated like a servant by an interpreter (with father John) from China. The Jeonju Lee Royal Family Association, made up of descendants of Joseon's royal family, criticized the series for its depiction of King Taejong, Prince Yangnyeong, and Prince Chungnyeong, and called for immediate cancellation of the show. Over 216,000 people also petitioned the Blue House to cancel the show. More than 3,900 complaints were sent to the Korea Communications Standards Commission concerning the television show. On March 24, 2021, the production company and the broadcaster SBS apologized for the historical inaccuracies. They promised to remove the controversial portions and initially said that they would take a break for one week to change the content. Due to the public backlash, corporate sponsors, such as Samsung Electronics and LG Household & Health Care, pulled their ads and cut their ties with the show. Local governments also withdrew their support for the production. On March 26, 2021, SBS announced that the show was canceled after the first two episodes due to the intense public backlash and the withdrawal of support from corporate sponsors and local governments.

=== Petition to bring the series to online streaming platforms ===
It was reported that the international fans of the drama are petitioning for Joseon Exorcist to be broadcast on online streaming platforms like Netflix, iQIYI and Viu.

== Viewership ==
Joseon Exorcist : South Korea viewers per episode (millions)

Season	Episode number		Average
Season	1	2	Average
1	1.751	1.294	1.523

Source: Audience measurement performed nationwide by Nielsen Korea.

Ep.	Part	Original broadcast date	Average audience share		
Ep.	Part	Original broadcast date	AGB Nielsen		TNmS
Ep.	Part	Original broadcast date	Nationwide	Seoul	Nationwide
1	1	March 22, 2021	5.7% (16th)	6.5% (13th)	6.1% (16th)
1	2	March 22, 2021	8.9% (5th)	9.9% (4th)	9.2% (5th)
2	1	March 23, 2021	4.5% (NR)	N/A	5.6% (16th)
2	2	March 23, 2021	6.9% (9th)	7.4% (7th)	7.5% (10th)
Average			6.5%	—	7.1%
In this table, the blue numbers represent the lowest ratings and the red numbers represent the highest ratings.; N/A denotes that the rating is not known.
