= Jang Dong-yoon =

South Korean actor (born 1992)

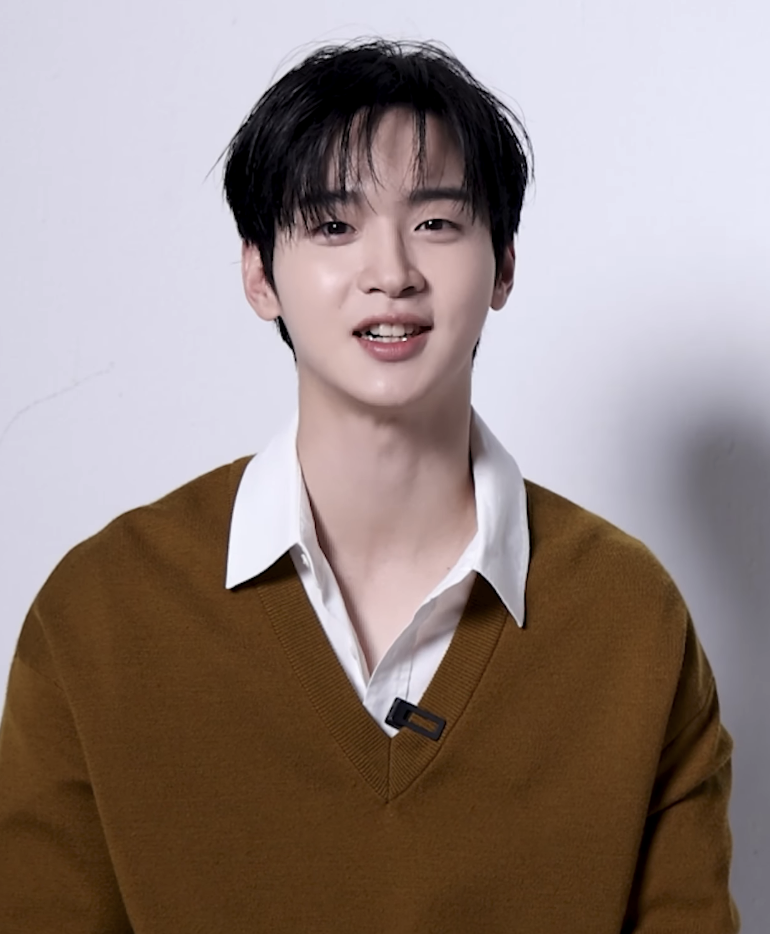
- Jang in 2024
- Born: July 12, 1992 (age 34); Daegu, South Korea
- Education: Hanyang University (Economics & Finance)
- Occupation: Actor
- Years active: 2016–present
- Agents: Dongyi Company; BH Entertainment
- Spouse: Kim Seung-yun (m. 2026)

Korean name
- Hangul: 장동윤
- RR: Jang Dongyun
- MR: Chang Tongyun

Signature
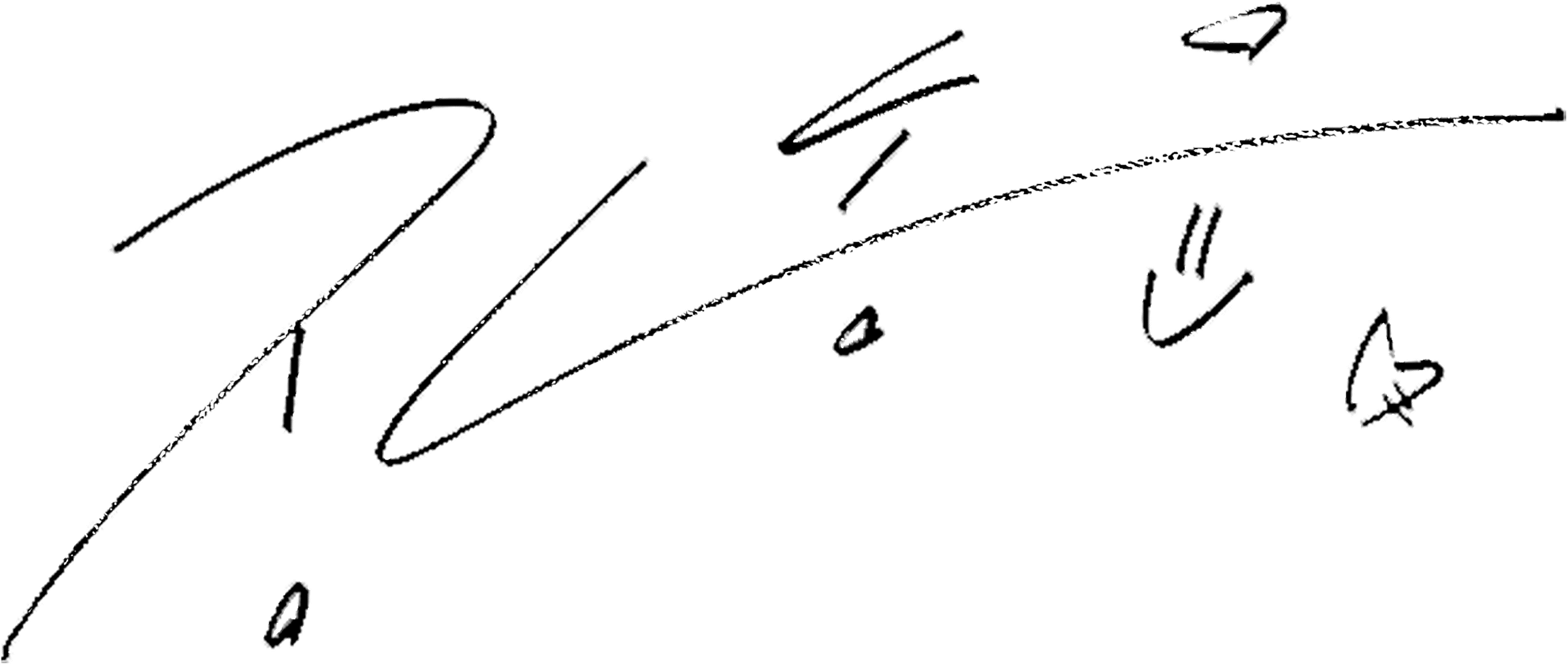

Jang Dong-yoon (Korean: 장동윤; born July 12, 1992) is a South Korean actor. He is best known for his leading roles in the popular television series School 2017 (2017), The Tale of Nokdu (2019), Search (2020), Daily Dose of Sunshine (2023), Like Flowers in Sand (2023–2024), and My Man is Cupid (2023–2024).

== Early life and education ==
After finishing high school, Jang began his mandatory military service in May 2012 and was discharged in February 2014. In 2015, while studying at Hanyang University, Jang was reported in the media for his bravery. It was reported that he had come across a robber with a lethal weapon threatening a convenience store clerk in Seoul's Gwanak District, and that he devised a quick plan to have the culprit arrested. He was recognized with a commendation from the Seoul Metropolitan Police Agency for this act of heroism. This popularity later led to him receiving many casting offers.

== Career ==
=== 2016–2018: Acting debut ===
In 2016, Jang debuted as an actor with the Naver web drama, Women at a Game Company. Later that year he was cast in the teen-mystery drama Solomon's Perjury.

In 2017, he joined as one of the main casts of the KBS teen-romance drama School 2017. The same year, he starred in the KBS Drama Special, If We Were a Season.

In 2018, he was cast in the leading role for tvN's medical drama A Poem a Day. The same year, he played a supporting role in the historical drama Mr. Sunshine. He also made his silver screen debut with the indie film Beautiful Days which opened the 23rd Busan International Film Festival, where he played as Lee Na-young's son. In December, he starred in the youth drama Just Dance for which he won the Best Actor in a One Act/Special/Short Drama – Excellence Award during the 2018 KBS Drama Awards.

=== 2019–present: Rising popularity ===
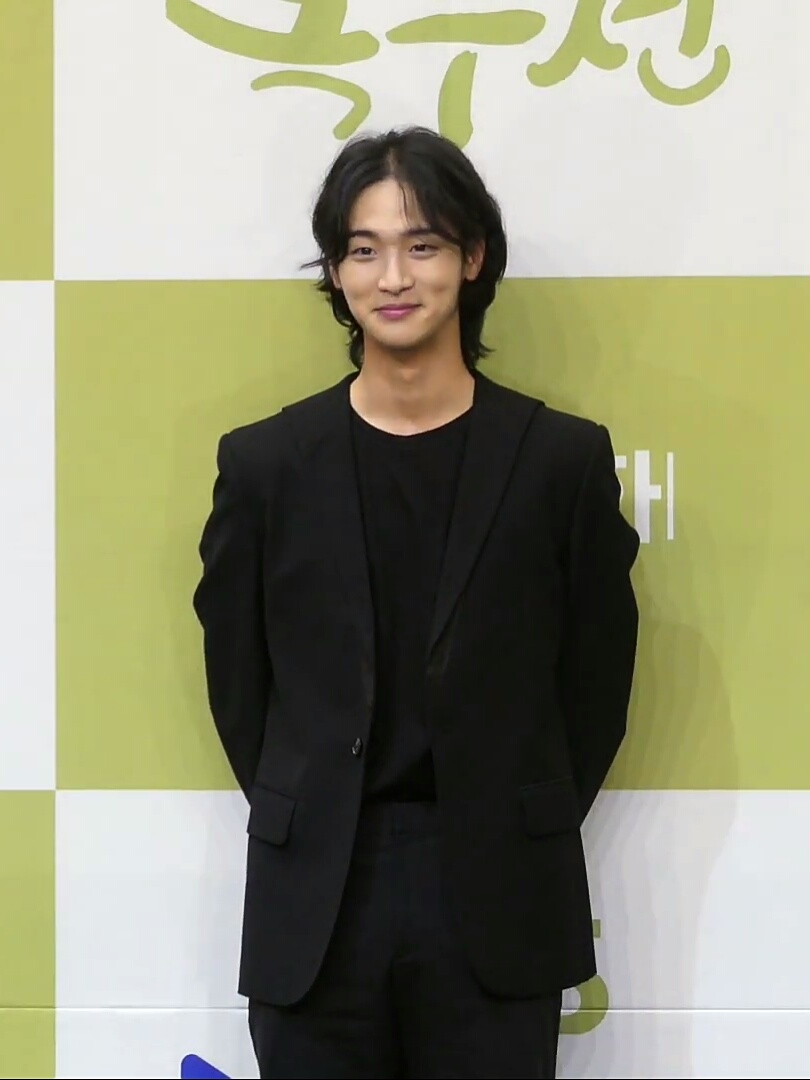
Jang in 2019

In 2019, Jang starred in the historical romantic comedy drama titled The Tale of Nokdu along with actress Kim So-hyun. He gained recognition and increased popularity for his role as the cross-dressing protagonist. He won the Excellence Award - Actor in a Miniseries at the 2019 KBS Drama Awards and Best New Actor award at the 7th APAN Star Awards.

In 2020, he was cast in another indie film, Run Boy Run by director Oh Won-jae. He also starred in South Korea's first military thriller drama set in the demilitarized zone, Search as a military dog handler.

In 2021, Joseon Exorcist, a show where Jang Dong-yoon was one of the leading stars, was cancelled after airing two episodes during the controversy over historical inaccuracies, such as incorrect use of Chinese traditional props. Actors began to delete drama-related SNS posts and Jang Dong-yoon was the first among the actors to post his position and apology. Later in October 2021, it was announced that the animated film Tae-il featuring Jang's voice will be released in December 2021.

In 2022, Jang returned to the big screen with the film Project Wolf Hunting followed by a return to the small screen with a role in Kim Bo Tong's The King of the Desert.

In 2023, he headlined the KBS Monday-Tuesday drama, Oasis. Jang won the Excellence Award at the 2023 KBS Drama Awards. He also acted in his first villain role in the film Devils where he played as a psychopath serial killer. Other notable works within the year were Daily Dose of Sunshine, Like Flowers in Sand, and My Man Is Cupid.

In March 2024, Jang signed with BH Entertainment.

== Personal life ==
On August 25, 2026, Jang announced his marriage to actress Kim Seung-yun in October. Jang and Kim had worked together on Jang's directed short film Please Be My Ear and film The Yeast.

Following Jang's marriage announcement, the crowdfunding campaign for his directorial film Nuruk was revisited. Some fans criticized the campaign, arguing that they had contributed to a film starring Jang's romantic partner without knowing about their relationship. They also questioned the use of Jang's autograph session and a Nuruk GV invitation as rewards targeting his fanbase. Some fans said they would not have contributed had they known about the relationship, describing the situation as deceptive to fans.

== Philanthropy ==
On August 30, 2022, Jang donated 6 million won in scholarship money to his father's retirement ceremony.

== Filmography ==
=== Film ===
Year	Title	Role	Notes	Ref.
2018	Beautiful Days	Zhen Chen		
2020	Run Boy Run	Do-won		
2021	Chun Tae-il: A Flame That Lives On	Jeon Tae-il (voice)	Animated film	
2022	Coda	Narrator	Barrier-free version	
2022	Project Wolf Hunting	Do-il		
2023	Pamir	Se-jun	Independent film	
2023	Long Distance	Do Ha		
2023	Please Be My Ear	Director / Writer / Actor	Short film	
2023	The Devils	Cha Jin-hyuk		

=== Television series ===
Year	Title	Role	Notes	Ref.
2016	Solomon's Perjury	Han Ji-hoon		
2017	School 2017	Song Dae-hwi		
2017	Drama Special	Uhm Gi-seok	Episode: "If We Were a Season"	
2017	Drama Stage	Julian (cameo)	Episode 1: "Assistant Manager Park's; Private Life"	
2018	A Poem a Day	Shin Min-ho		
2018	Mr. Sunshine	Lee Joon-young	Episode 16–24	
2018	Drama Special	Cameo	Episode: "The Tuna and the Dolphin"	
2018	Just Dance	Kwon Seung-chan		
2019	The Tale of Nokdu	Jeon Nok-du / Lady Kim		
2020	Search	Yong Dong-jin		
2021	Joseon Exorcist	Prince Chungnyeong		
2023	Oasis	Lee Doo-hak		
2023–2024	Like Flowers in Sand	Kim Baek-doo		
2025	Queen Mantis	Cha Soo-yeol / Kim Jeong-ho		

=== Web series ===
Year	Title	Role	Notes	Ref.
2016	Game Development Girls	Gom Gae-bal		
2017	Green Fever	Baek Seung-chan / Jang Dong-yoon	Cameo (Ep. 2, 3, 7, 8, 10, 11)	
2018	Top Management	Dong-yoon	Cameo (Ep. 16)	
2022	The King of the Desert	Cheon-woong		
2023	Daily Dose of Sunshine	Song Yoo-chan		
2023	My Man Is Cupid	Cheon Sang-hyuk		

=== Television shows ===
Year	Title	Role	Notes	Ref.
2018	Law of the Jungle in Sabah	Cast member	Episode 330–333	
2019	I Miss Korea	Cast member	Episode 1–3, 6–8	
2019	The Gashinas	Cast member	Episode 1–4	
2019	Radio Star	Special MC	Episode 649	

=== Hosting ===
Year	Title	Notes	Ref.
2019	2019 KBS Entertainment Awards	with Jun Hyun-moo and Son Dam-bi	
2020	2020 Korean Popular Culture and Arts Awards	with Jang Ye-won	
2023	2023 Korean Popular Culture and Arts Awards	with Jang Ye-won	

=== Music videos appearances ===
Year	Song title	Artist	Ref.
2016	"Galaxy" (우주를 줄게)	Bolbbalgan4	
2016	"That 5 Minutes" (길어야 5분)	10cm	
2017	"Emptiness in Memory" (기억의 빈자리)	Naul	

== Discography ==
=== Soundtrack appearance ===
List of soundtrack appearances, showing year released, and name of the album
Title	Year	Album
"Nobody Knows" (체념) (with Joo Ha-yoon)	2023	Oasis OST Part 2

== Ambassadorship ==
- Ambassador for 2022 Unobstructed Films (2021)
- Public Relations Ambassador for Asian Development Bank (ADB) Annual General Meeting (2023)
- Ambassador for Korea International Rescue (2023)

== Awards and nominations ==
Name of the award ceremony, year presented, category, nominee of the award, and the result of the nomination
Award ceremony	Year	Category	Nominee(s) / Work(s)	Result	Ref.
APAN Star Awards	2021	Best New Actor	The Tale of Nokdu	Won	
APAN Star Awards	2021	Popular Star Award, Actor	The Tale of Nokdu	Nominated	
Asia Artist Awards	2020	Popularity Award (Actor)	Jang Dong-yoon	Nominated	
Chunsa Film Art Awards	2019	Best New Actor	Beautiful Days	Nominated	
Grand Bell Awards	2020	Best New Actor	Beautiful Days	Nominated	
KBS Drama Awards	2017	Best Actor in a One Act/Special/Short Drama	Drama Special – If We Were a Season	Nominated	
KBS Drama Awards	2018	Best Actor in a One Act/Special/Short Drama	Just Dance	Won	
KBS Drama Awards	2019	Excellence Award, Actor in a Miniseries	The Tale of Nokdu	Won	
KBS Drama Awards	2019	Netizen Award, Actor	The Tale of Nokdu	Nominated	
KBS Drama Awards	2019	Best Couple Award	Jang Dong-yoon (with Kim So-hyun); The Tale of Nokdu	Won	
KBS Drama Awards	2019	Best Couple Award	Jang Dong-yoon (with Kang Tae-oh); The Tale of Nokdu	Nominated	
KBS Drama Awards	2023	Top Excellence Award, Actor	Oasis	Nominated	
KBS Drama Awards	2023	Popularity Award, Actor	Oasis	Nominated	
KBS Drama Awards	2023	Excellence Award, Actor in a Miniseries	Oasis	Won	
KBS Drama Awards	2023	Best Couple Award	Jang Dong-yoon (with Seol In-ah); Oasis	Won	
Korea First Brand Awards	2019	Rising Star Award, Actor	Jang Dong-yoon	Won	
SBS Drama Awards	2025	Excellence Award, Actor in a Miniseries Genre/Action Drama	Queen Mantis	Won	
