= Doctor Lawyer =

2022 South Korean television series

- Promotional poster
- Also known as: Dr. Lawyer
- Hangul: 닥터 로이어
- RR: Dakteo roieo
- MR: Takt'ŏ roiŏ
- Genre: Medical; Legal
- Developed by: Kim Ho-jun (planning)
- Written by: Jang Hong-cheol
- Directed by: Lee Yong-seok; Lee Dong-hyun
- Starring: So Ji-sub; Shin Sung-rok; Im Soo-hyang
- Country of origin: South Korea
- Original language: Korean
- No. of episodes: 16

Production
- Executive producers: Jo Na-yoon; Jeong Dae-woong; Jun Hyung-man
- Producers: Park Jae-sam; Yoo Byung-sul; Lee Seung-hee
- Running time: 70 minutes
- Production companies: Celltrion Entertainment; Mongjakso

Original release
- Network: MBC TV
- Release: June 3 – July 23, 2022

Doctor Lawyer (Korean: 닥터 로이어) is a 2022 South Korean television series starring So Ji-sub, Shin Sung-rok, and Im Soo-hyang. It premiered on MBC TV on June 3, 2022, and aired every Friday and Saturday at 21:50 (KST) for 16 episodes. It is also available for streaming on Disney+ in selected regions.

== Synopsis ==
A genius surgeon who became a lawyer specializing in medical litigation after losing everything through a rigged operation, and a prosecutor in charge of medical crimes who lost her only family (younger brother) and lover due to that operation, work together to punish people who believe that wealth and power can rank above life, and comfort the victims of medical negligence.

== Cast ==
=== Main ===
- So Ji-sub as Han Yi-han
  - Yoo Seon-ho as young Han Yi-han

Once a genius double-board surgeon specialized in general surgery and cardiothoracic surgery, but now a lawyer specializing in medical litigation.

- Shin Sung-rok as Jayden Lee

Asian branch manager of Honors Hand, a company that specializes in lobbying and investment.

- Im Soo-hyang as Geum Seok-yeong
  - Shin Soo-yeon as young Geum Seok-yeong

A prosecutor in the medical crime division of the Seoul Central District Prosecutors' Office.

=== Supporting ===
==== Banseok Foundation and Hospital ====
- Lee Geung-young as Gu Jin-gi

Chairman of Banseok Foundation and Director of Banseok Hospital. He is a candidate for Minister of Health and Welfare.

- Lee Joo-bin as Lim Yu-na

Director of Banseok R&D Center.

- Lee Dong-ha as Gu Hyun-seong

Director of Banseok Hospital and Gu Jin-gi's only son.

- Woo Hyun-joo as Pyo Eun-sil

An ace attorney and the team leader of Banseok Foundation's Legal Team.

- Choi Deok-moon as Lee Do-hyeong

Former Director of Anesthesia Department at Banseok Hospital, currently serving as Assistant Director of Banseok Hospital.

- Kim Hyung-mook as Park Ki-tae

A thoracic surgeon at Banseok Hospital.

- Lee Seung-woo as Choi Yo-sub

A 3rd year fellow at the Thoracic Surgery Department of Banseok Hospital.

- Lee Gyu-bok as Director Cheon

Gu Jin-gi's bodyguard and assistant.

- Shin Su-jeong as Yoo Ga-yeon

Head of the management office at Banseok Hospital.

- Kim Ho-jung as Cho Jung-hyun

Head of Nursing at Banseok Hospital and also served as a Clinical Professor in the Department of Nursing at Banseok University.

- Moon Hee-kyung as Jang Jeong-ok

Gu Jin-gi's wife.

==== New Hope Attorney's Office ====
- Jung Min-ah as Jo Da-rom

Special Investigator at New Hope.

- Seo Yoon-ah as Ban Soo-hee

Jo Da-rom's college senior and ace medical journalist.

- Jo Hyun-sik as Kang Dae-woong

A nurse from Banseok Hospital who followed Han Yi-han to New Hope.

==== Medical Crime Division ====
- Choi Jae-woong as Baek Kang-ho

Chief Prosecutor at the Medical Crimes Division at Seoul Central District Prosecutor's Office.

- Noh Young-hak as Jung Hee-kyung

A Level 8 investigator in the Medical Crimes Division teaming up with Geum Seok-young.

- Lee Sang-hoon as Park Gye-jang

A veteran investigator with 25 years of experience.

==== Others ====
- Nam Myeong-ryeol as Lim Tae-moon

Former Foreign Minister, Ambassador to the U.S., current Korean Party presidential candidate.

- Kang Kyung-hun as Yoon Mi-sun

A 4th term member of the National Assembly and the leader of the ruling Daehan Party.

- Kim Tae-gyeom as Michael Young

Strategy Team Leader of Honors Hand Asia.

- Park Joon-hyuk as Kwon Yun-seok

Yoon Mi-sun aide and legal assistance.

- Lee Kyung-jin as Jayden's mother

She is a kind woman and mother of Jayden.

==== Extended ====
- Han Seung-bin as Geum Seok-ju

Geum Seok-young's younger brother who suffers from a heart disease.

- Lim Cheol-hyung as Nam Hyuk-cheol

A death row inmate who was once a reputed medical device businessman, Cho Jung-hyun's ex-husband.

- Kim Yoon-seo as Jung Yun-jeong

An elite autopsy surgeon from the National Forensic Service.

- Nam Gi-ae as Han Yi-han's mother
- Hwang Hyun-bin as Mongolian housekeeper
- Jang Seo-yeon as Gil Seo-yeon

An idol who lost her voice due to the side effects of a surgery.

- Park Seon-hye as Gil Seo-yeon's mother
- Park Min-sang as Nam Jun-hwan

The son of Nam Hyuk-cheol and Jo Jung-hyun. A patient with hypertrophic cardiomyopathy.

- Jung Bo-min as Yang Seon-ae

Yoon Mi-sun's daughter.

- Kim Dae-geon as Do Jin-woo

Yang Seon-ae's boyfriend.

- Seo Jin-won as Ho Jun-bu

== Production ==
On April 27, 2022, photos from the script reading site were released.

== Original soundtrack ==
=== Part 1 ===
Released on June 10, 2022
No.	Title	Lyrics	Music	Artist	Length
1.	"Freedom"	Kang Dana; Quokka (Stupid Squad)	Kang Dana; Quokka (Stupid Squad); Oh Hyung-seok (Stupid Squad)	Lee Chang-sub	3:47
2.	"Freedom" (Inst.)		Kang Dana; Quokka (Stupid Squad); Oh Hyung-seok (Stupid Squad)		3:47
Total length:					7:34

=== Part 2 ===
Released on June 17, 2022
No.	Title	Lyrics	Music	Artist	Length
1.	"An Unfamiliar Day" (낯선 하루)	Ha Geun-young; Noh Sung-eun (Chansline); Kim Shi-won (Chansline); Kim Sung-min (Chansline)	Noh Sung-eun (Chansline); Kim Shi-won (Chansline); Kim Sung-min (Chansline)	Chen (Exo)	4:04
2.	"An Unfamiliar Day" (낯선 하루; Inst.)		Noh Sung-eun (Chansline); Kim Shi-won (Chansline); Kim Sung-min (Chansline)		4:04
Total length:					8:08

=== Part 3 ===
Released on June 25, 2022
No.	Title	Lyrics	Music	Artist	Length
1.	"Fight On"	Park Sang-yoo	Sang Yoon; MLC; Louis; Fascinador	Yoo Hwe-seung (N.Flying)	3:21
2.	"Fight On" (Inst.)		Sang Yoon; MLC; Louis; Fascinador		3:21
Total length:					6:42

=== Part 4 ===
Released on July 1, 2022
No.	Title	Lyrics	Music	Artist	Length
1.	"My Shadow"	Ha Geun-young; Lee Soo-yeon	Ha Geun-young; Lee Soo-yeon	Yi Ra-on	3:39
2.	"My Shadow" (Inst.)		Ha Geun-young; Lee Soo-yeon		3:39
Total length:					7:18

== Viewership ==
Doctor Lawyer : South Korea viewers per episode (thousands)

Season	Episode number																Average
Season	1	2	3	4	5	6	7	8	9	10	11	12	13	14	15	16	Average
1	1006	806	1162	852	997	1285	1117	1076	1064	1077	1285	1168	1188	1100	1294	1294	1111

Source: Audience measurement performed nationwide by Nielsen Korea.

Average TV viewership ratings
Ep.	Original broadcast date	Average audience share		
Ep.	Original broadcast date	Nielsen Korea		TNmS
Ep.	Original broadcast date	Nationwide	Seoul	Nationwide
1	June 3, 2022	5.2% (10th)	5.7% (8th)	5.3% (11th)
2	June 4, 2022	4.2% (16th)	4.6% (11th)	3.7% (18th)
3	June 10, 2022	6.5% (9th)	6.4% (6th)	6.8% (9th)
4	June 11, 2022	4.9% (13th)	5.1% (9th)	5.1% (10th)
5	June 17, 2022	5.7% (9th)	5.4% (9th)	5.3% (13th)
6	June 18, 2022	6.9% (4th)	6.7% (4th)	6.3% (4th)
7	June 24, 2022	6.4% (9th)	6.5% (7th)	6.5% (9th)
8	June 25, 2022	5.4% (12th)	5.2% (11th)	N/A
9	July 1, 2022	6.3% (10th)	6.0% (9th)	5.9% (11th)
10	July 2, 2022	6.2% (6th)	6.3% (5th)	6.4% (3rd)
11	July 8, 2022	7.2% (6th)	7.1% (7th)	N/A
12	July 9, 2022	6.1% (5th)	6.2% (4th)	6.5% (5th)
13	July 15, 2022	6.5% (8th)	6.3% (7th)	6.4% (11th)
14	July 16, 2022	6.2% (5th)	6.2% (6th)	6.2% (5th)
15	July 22, 2022	7.1% (7th)	7.3% (6th)	6.4% (11th)
16	July 23, 2022	7.0% (5th)	7.2% (5th)	6.4% (4th)
Average		6.11%	6.14%	— (Note: Due to some ratings not released, the exact average rating is unknown.)
In the table above, the blue numbers represent the lowest ratings and the red numbers represent the highest ratings.; N/A denotes that ratings were not released.
