= Beautiful Days (2018 film) =

- Main poster
- Hangul: 뷰티풀 데이즈
- RR: Byutipul deijeu
- MR: Pyut'ip'ul teijŭ
- Directed by: Jéro Yun
- Written by: Jéro Yun
- Produced by: Kim Hyun-woo
- Starring: Lee Na-young; Jang Dong-yoon
- Cinematography: Kim Jong-sun
- Edited by: Jéro Yun
- Music by: Mathieu Regnault
- Production companies: Peppermint & Company
- Distributed by: Smile Entertainment; Contents Panda
- Release dates: October 4, 2018 (BIFF); November 21, 2018 (South Korea)
- Running time: 104 minutes
- Countries: South Korea; France
- Language: Korean
- Box office: US$45,395

Beautiful Days (Korean: 뷰티풀 데이즈) is a 2018 South Korean drama film starring Lee Na-young, Jang Dong-yoon and Oh Kwang-rok. The film premiered as the opening film of the 23rd edition of the Busan International Film Festival on October 4, 2018. It was released in theaters on November 21, 2018.

== Plot ==
The film follows the life of a North Korean defector who gives birth to a son at a young age and abandons her husband and child for a better life abroad. The hidden past is revealed after fourteen years when the grown-up son visits her.

== Cast ==
- Lee Na-young as Mother
- Jang Dong-yoon as Zhen Chen
- Oh Kwang-rok as Zhen Chen's father
- Lee Yoo-jun as Pimp
- Seo Hyun-woo
- Lee Jung-joon

== Production ==
Beautiful Days is director Jéro Yun's debut feature film and lead actress Lee Na-young's first film in 5 years.

The film began production on October 31, 2017. Filming wrapped on November 26, 2017.

== Reception ==
In Variety, Peter Debruge says, "Lee Na-young impresses as a North Korean woman tracked down by her long-since-abandoned son". Reviewing it for Screendaily, Wendy Ide noted the film as being structurally a little over-complicated, but still is an impressive drama which feels convincingly rooted in real lives and stories.

Clarence Tsui of The Hollywood Reporter writes, "Beautiful Days certainly lives up to its title with its mesmerizing imagery and very polished production values. But it is weighed down by a clichéd narrative and simplistic moral binaries".
