= Kang Kyung-hun =

South Korean actress (born 1975)

- Born: 14 March 1975 (age 51); South Korea
- Other name: Kang Kyung-heon
- Education: Dankook University (Department of Theater and Film)
- Occupation: Actress
- Years active: 1995–present
- Agent: Mask Studio
- Known for: Alchemy of Souls; Oasis; Doctor Lawyer
- Website: maskstudio.kr/KANGKYUNGHUN

Kang Kyung-hun is a South Korean actress. She is known for her roles in dramas such as Vagabond, Doctor Lawyer, Alchemy of Souls, and Oasis. She also appeared in movies Spider Forest, A Lonely Island in the Distant Sea, Empire of Lust, A Cruel Attendance and Hunt.

== Filmography ==
=== Television series ===
Year	Title	Role	Ref.
2003	South of the Sun	Hong Se-young	
2004	Proposal	Se-ryon	
2007	Blue Fish	Yoo Jin-hee	
2007	Landscape in My Heart	Jo Hye-rin	
2008	The Great King, Sejong	Cho Koong-jang	
2011	Midas	Bae Jung-ja	
2011	Indomitable Daughters-in-Law	Han Hye-won	
2012	Drama Special Series: "Assembly"	Mi-sook	
2012	The Great Seer	Bong-choon	
2013	The Heirs	Dong-wook's lover	
2013	Basketball	Hong-ki's mother	
2014	Birth of a Beauty	Lee Jin-young	
2015	A Bird That Doesn't Sing	Jo Dal-yeon	
2016	Local Hero	Kang Ri-soo	
2017	Save Me	Lee Ji-hee	
2017	Witch at Court	Sun Hye-young	
2018	Priest	Cha Sun-young	
2018	Should We Kiss First?	Bong Jae-soon	
2019	Vagabond	Oh Sang-mi	
2021	The Road: The Tragedy of One	Bae Kyung-sook	
2022	Alchemy of Souls	Seo Ha-sun	
2022	Doctor Lawyer	Yoon Mi-sun	
2023	Oasis	Kang Yeo-jin	
2023	KBS Drama Special	Yoon-ho's mother	
2023	KBS Drama Special: Behind the Shadows	Yoon-ho's mother	
2024	Cinderella at 2 AM	Yeong-soo's mother	
2026	Mission: Mompossible	Jeon Jin-hee	

=== Film ===
Year	Title	Role	Ref.
2004	Spider Forest	Hwang Soo-young	
2006	Magicians	Ha-young	
2006	A Cruel Attendance	Dong-cheol's wife	
2015	Empire of Lust	Lady Jeong	
2021	A Lonely Island in the Distant Sea	Heo Young-ji	
2022	Hunt	Kim Jeong-do's wife	
2022	Decibel	Superintendent	
2024	Fragment	Mom	
2025	Secret: Untold Melody	Yeon-seo	

== Awards and nominations ==
Name of the award ceremony, year presented, category, nominee of the award, and the result of the nomination
Award ceremony	Year	Category	Nominee / Work	Result	Ref.
KBS Drama Awards	2023	Best Supporting Actress	Behind the Shadows	Won	
KBS Drama Awards	2023	Best Supporting Actress	Oasis	Won	
KBS Super Talent	1996	Photogenic Award	—N/a	Won	
SBS Entertainment Awards	2018	Best New Actress	Burning Youth	Won	
