= Choo Young-woo =

South Korean actor (born 1999)

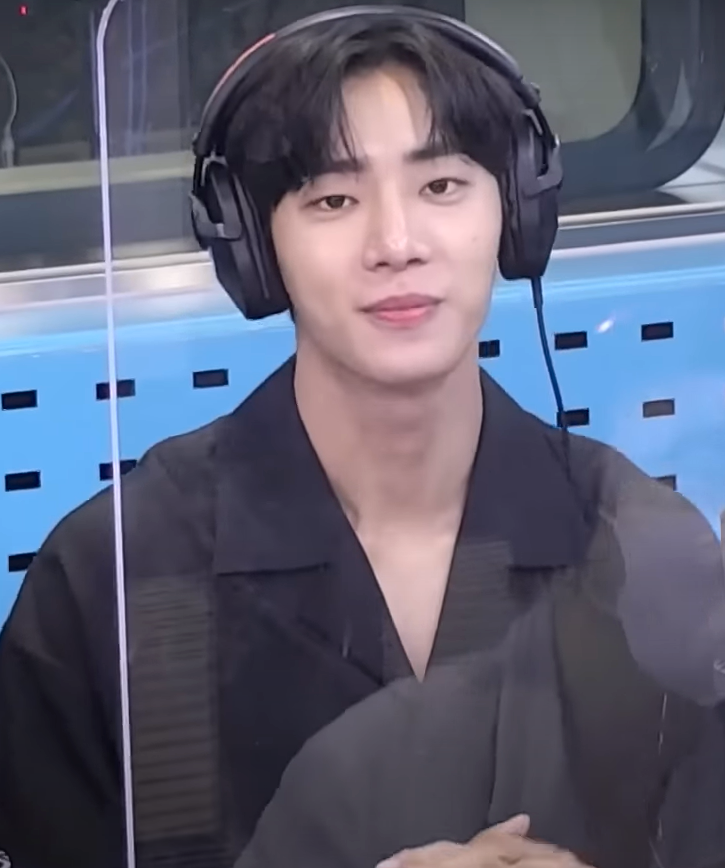
- Choo in September 2022
- Born: June 5, 1999 (age 27); South Korea
- Occupation: Actor
- Years active: 2021–present
- Agent(s): J,Wide-Company
- Relatives: Choo Jung-woo (brother)

Korean name
- Hangul: 추영우
- RR: Chu Yeongu
- MR: Ch'u Yŏngu

Choo Young-woo (Korean: 추영우; born June 5, 1999) is a South Korean actor. He is known for his roles in the television series The Tale of Lady Ok (2024–2025), The Trauma Code: Heroes on Call (2025), and Head Over Heels (2025).

== Career ==
In 2025, Choo made his film debut with the romance film Even If This Love Disappears From the World Tonight directed by Kim Hye-young, based on the novel of the same name. It was released theatrically on Christmas Eve 2025, and is also available to stream on Netflix since February 2026.

== Filmography ==
=== Film ===
Key
†	Denotes films that have not yet been released

Year	Title	Role	Ref.
2025	Even if This Love Disappears from the World Tonight	Kim Jae-won	

=== Television series ===
Key
†	Denotes television productions that have not yet been released

Year	Title	Role	Notes	Ref.
2021	Police University	Park Min-kyu		
2021–2022	School 2021	Jung Young-joo		
2022	Drama Stage – Babel Syndrome	Jang Ha-neul	Season 5; One-act drama	
2022	Once Upon a Small Town	Han Ji-yul		
2023	Oasis	Choi Chul-woong		
2024–2025	The Tale of Lady Ok	Cheon Seung-hwi/Song Seo-in/Sung Yoon-gyeom		
2025	The Trauma Code: Heroes on Call	Yang Jae-won		
2025	Mercy for None	Lee Geum-son		
2025	Head Over Heels	Bae Gyeon-woo		
2026	Between Steps	Park Min-jae		
TBA	Long Vacation †	Demon 3375		

=== Web series ===
Year	Title	Role	Ref.
2021	You Make Me Dance	Song Si-on	

== Accolades ==
=== Awards and nominations ===
Name of the award ceremony, year presented, category, nominee of the award, and the result of the nomination
Award ceremony	Year	Category	Nominee / Work	Result	Ref.
APAN Star Awards	2023	Best New Actor	Oasis	Nominated	
APAN Star Awards	2023	Excellence Award, Actor in a Webseries	Once Upon a Small Town	Won	
APAN Star Awards	2025	Excellence Award, Actor in a Miniseries	The Trauma Code: Heroes on Call; Head over Heels	Nominated	
Asia Artist Awards	2025	Best Actor – Male	Choo Young-woo	Won	
Asia Artist Awards	2025	Icon Award – Actor	Choo Young-woo	Won	
Asia Star Entertainer Awards	2025	Best Artist (Actor) – Male	Choo Young-woo	Won	
Asia Star Entertainer Awards	2025	Global Rising Actor	Choo Young-woo	Won	
Baeksang Arts Awards	2025	Best New Actor	The Tale of Lady Ok	Won	
Blue Dragon Series Awards	2025	Best New Actor	The Trauma Code: Heroes on Call	Won	
Brand Customer Loyalty Awards	2025	Male Actor (Rising Star)	Choo Young-woo	Won	
Cine21 Film Awards	2025	New Actor of the Year	The Trauma Code: Heroes on Call	Won	
Global OTT Awards	2025	Best Newcomer Actor	The Trauma Code: Heroes on Call	Nominated	
KBS Drama Awards	2021	Best New Actor	Police University; School 2021	Nominated	
KBS Drama Awards	2023	Best New Actor	Oasis	Won	
KBS Drama Awards	2023	Excellence Award, Actor in a Miniseries	Oasis	Nominated	
KBS Drama Awards	2023	Popularity Award, Actor	Oasis	Nominated	
Korea Drama Awards	2025	Best New Actor	The Tale of Lady Ok; Head over Heels	Won	

=== State and cultural honors ===
Name of country or organization, year given, and name of honor
Country or organization	Year	Honor	Ref.
Korean Popular Culture and Arts Awards (Note: Honors are given at the Korean Popular Culture and Arts Awards, arranged by the Korea Creative Content Agency and hosted by the Ministry of Culture, Sports and Tourism. They are awarded to those who have contributed to the arts and South Korea's pop culture.)	2025	Minister of Culture, Sports and Tourism Commendation	
Newsis K-Expo Cultural Awards (Note: Co-sponsored by Korea's Ministry of Culture, Sports and Tourism, Ministry of Trade, Industry, and Energy, Korea Communications Commission, and Korea Creative Content Agency, it awards cultural icons and businesses that promote the sustainability of the Korean Wave and boost the industry's competitiveness.)	2025	Seoul Tourism Foundation CEO Award	

=== Listicles ===
Name of publisher, year listed, name of listicle, and placement
Publisher	Year	Listicle	Placement	Ref.
Forbes Korea	2025	30 Under 30 (Entertainment)	Included	
