= The Matchmakers (TV series) =

2023 South Korean television series

- Promotional poster
- Hangul: 혼례대첩
- Hanja: 婚禮大捷
- Lit.: Wedding Battle
- RR: Hollye daecheop
- MR: Hollye taech'ŏp
- Genre: Period drama; Romantic comedy
- Written by: Ha Soo-jin
- Directed by: Hwang Seung-gi; Kim Soo-jin
- Starring: Rowoon; Cho Yi-hyun
- Music by: Park Seung-jin
- Country of origin: South Korea
- Original language: Korean
- No. of episodes: 16

Production
- Executive producer: Yoon Jae-hyuk (KBS)
- Producers: Seok Shin-ho; Kwon Yong-han; Eom Joo-young
- Production companies: FNC Story; Cine Zoo
- Budget: ₩17.2 billion

Original release
- Network: KBS2
- Release: October 30 – December 25, 2023

The Matchmakers (Korean: 혼례대첩) is a 2023 South Korean television series starring Rowoon and Cho Yi-hyun. It aired on KBS2 from October 30 to December 25, 2023, every Monday and Tuesday at 21:45 (KST) for 16 episodes. It is also available for streaming on Wavve in South Korea and, on Viki and Viu in selected regions.

== Synopsis ==
The series tells the story about a young widower, named Shim Jung-woo, and a young widow, named Jung Soon-deok, joining forces to marry off three unmarried women who represent the problem of "old maids" in Joseon.

== Cast ==
=== Main ===
- Rowoon as Shim Jung-woo

A Confucian scholar who becomes the youngest person to pass the state civil service examination.

- Cho Yi-hyun as Jung Soon-deok

A widow and the second daughter-in-law of the Left State Councilor, she secretly works as Yeoju-daek, the best matchmaker and bangmul seller in Hanyang.

=== Supporting ===
==== People around Shim Jung-woo ====
- Kim Hyun-mok as Kim Oh-bong

Jung-woo's butler.

- Kim Geon-ho as Yoo Eui-won

Jung-woo's doctor. He is a member of the State Council.

- Kim Yeon-woo as Shim Myung-woo

Jung-woo's older brother.

- Lee Sang-gu as Shim Jin-ho

Jung-woo's father.

==== People around Jung Soon-deok ====
- Heo Nam-jun as Jung Soon-gu

Soon-deok's older brother. He works as a government inspector.

- Bang Eun-jung as Gae Dong-yi

Soon-deok's maid who supports her double life.

The Left State Councilor's family

- Park Ji-young as Lady Park So-hyeon

Soon-deok's mother-in-law.

- Lee Hae-young as Jo Yeong-bae

Soon-deok's father-in-law who is the Left State Councilor.

- Lee Soon-won as Park Bok-ki

Lady Park's younger brother who is a Minister of Military Affairs.

- Oh Ye-ju as Jo Ye-jin

The famous daughter of the Jo family and Soon-deok's sister-in-law. She is considered Hanyang's best bride material with a lot of talent.

- Kim Si-woo as Jo Geun-seok

The son of Soon-deok's deceased elder brother-in-law and the eldest grandson of the Jo family. Currently registered as Soon-deok's son.

- Park Seong-jin as Jo In-hyeon

The deceased eldest son of the Left State Councilor.

- Yoon Yeo-won as Jo In-guk

Soon-deok's deceased husband.

- Kim Ga-young as Sam-wol's mother

The family maid and Lady Park's right-hand woman.

==== People in the palace ====
- Jo Han-chul as the King

King of Joseon and Jung-woo's father-in-law.

- Jin Hee-kyung as the Queen

The crown prince's mother.

- Hong Dong-young as Lee Jae

The crown prince.

- Seo Jin-won as Do Seung-ji

The king's closest right-hand man.

- Park Hyun-jung as Royal Noble Consort Sukbin Park

Prince Jin-seong's mother and a concubine who was favored by the King.

- Kim Da-heein as Kim Moon-gun

A minister.

- Hwiyoung as Lee Jwa-rang

Park Bok-ki's close aide who is good at literary and martial arts.

- Park Chae-young as Princess Hyojeong

Jung-woo's deceased wife.

==== The Maeng family ====
- Choi Hee-jin as Lady Cho

Mother of the three Maeng sisters and a former matchmaker.

- Jung Shin-hye as Maeng Ha-na

The eldest daughter of the Maeng sisters.

- Park Ji-won as Maeng Doo-ri

The second daughter of the Maeng sisters who is known as Mak De-nyeo (a woman with a harsh tongue) due to her foul mouth.

- Jung Bo-min as Maeng Sam-soon

The third daughter of Maeng sisters who is a novelist. She disguises herself as a man using the pen name "Hwa Rok".

==== Groom candidates ====
- Son Sang-yeon as Lee Si-yeol

A Sungkyunkwan Confucian student and the eldest grandson of the Sungkyunkwan Daeseong family. He is considered the best groom material in Hanyang.

- Choi Kyung-hoon as Yoon Bu-gyeom

Jo Ye-jin's first love. He is an only son and orphan who farms with his grandparents.

- Bin Chan-wook as Heo Sook-hyun

A scholar who dreams of becoming a colonel.

- Jung Woo-jae as Kim Jip

A romanticist traveling around the eight provinces in search of a woman who will truly love him rather than his family.

- Cho Chang-hee as Jang Chun-bae

He is using his wealth to find a young bride.

- Go Deok-won as Han Jong-bok

He has been preparing for the civil service exam for 10 years. He is looking for a bride who can support him well.

==== People in the Hongwol Gaekju ====
- Park Hwan-hee as Yeoju-daek

A merchant who makes and sells makeup. She lives in Hanyang with her daughter.

- Jeong Seung-gil as Hong Cheon-soo

The owner of Hongwol Gaekju, who sets the trend for Hanyang noble ladies.

- Jeong Yeon as Mrs. Lee

A member of the Bangmul Merchants.

- Jeong Ji-an as Masan-daek

A member of the Bangmul Merchants.

- Park Bo-bae as Jonju-daek

A member of the Bangmul Merchants.

- Lee So-e as Gaeseong-daek

The youngest member of the Bangmul Merchants.

- Lee Ye-ju as Bok-hee

Yeoju-daek's daughter.

==== Others ====
- Kim Dong-ho as Ahn Dong-gun

A former sergeant, but nowadays he is a laborer who hunts down runaway slaves.

- Woo Hyun-joo as Lady Jung

Lee Si-yeol's mother.

- Lee Chang-min as Mae Gol-seung

A monk at Seonhwasa Temple.

- Jang Hye-jin as Lady Song
- Yang A-reum as Lee Cho-ok

Maeng Ha-na's friend who supposedly committed suicide. Jung Soon-gu is investigating her death.

== Production ==
=== Casting ===
On July 5, 2023, Rowoon and Cho Yi-hyun confirmed their appearances in the series.

== Reception ==
=== Viewership ===
The Matchmakers : South Korea viewers per episode (thousands)

Season	Episode number															
Season	1	2	3	4	5	6	7	8	9	10	11	12	13	14	15	16
1	733	593	696	657	611	633	N/A	664	728	591	755	739	797	N/A	N/A	N/A

Source: Audience measurement performed nationwide by Nielsen Korea.

Average TV viewership ratings
Ep.	Original broadcast date	Average audience share (Nielsen Korea)	
Ep.	Original broadcast date	Nationwide	Seoul
1	October 30, 2023	4.5% (13th)	4.2% (12th)
2	October 31, 2023	3.6% (14th)	3.4% (13th)
3	November 6, 2023	4.0% (17th)	4.0% (15th)
4	November 7, 2023	3.9% (12th)	3.7% (13th)
5	November 13, 2023	3.5% (18th)	3.5% (16th)
6	November 14, 2023	3.7% (13th)	3.4% (12th)
7	November 20, 2023	3.3% (21st)	3.6% (16th)
8	November 27, 2023	3.9% (16th)	4.1% (12th)
9	November 28, 2023	4.1% (12th)	4.0% (10th)
10	December 4, 2023	3.4% (18th)	3.4% (16th)
11	December 5, 2023	4.3% (13th)	4.2% (9th)
12	December 11, 2023	4.3% (16th)	4.3% (13th)
13	December 12, 2023	4.4% (10th)	4.6% (9th)
14	December 18, 2023	5% (12th)	N/A
15	December 19, 2023	5% (10th)	N/A
16	December 25, 2023	5.8% (9th)	N/A
Average		4.2%	— (Note: Due to multiple unpublished ratings, the exact average rating is unknown.)
In the table above, the blue numbers represent the lowest ratings and the red numbers represent the highest ratings.; N/A denotes ratings that were not published.

=== Accolades ===
Name of the award ceremony, year presented, category, nominee of the award, and the result of the nomination
Award ceremony	Year	Category	Nominee / Work	Result	Ref.
Baeksang Arts Awards	2024	Technical Award	Ha Ji-hee (Art direction)	Nominated	
