= Jung Bo-min =

South Korean actress (born 1997)

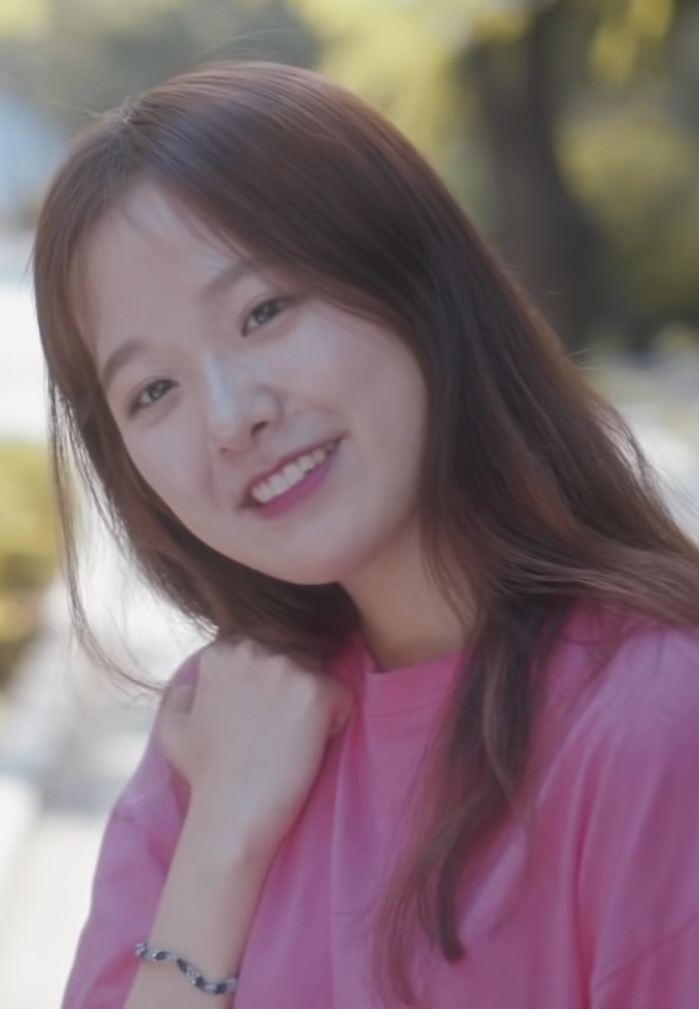
- Jung in 2017
- Born: June 17, 1997 (age 29); South Korea
- Education: Dongduk Women's University
- Occupation: Actress
- Years active: 2019–present
- Agent: Outer Korea

Korean name
- Hangul: 정보민
- RR: Jeong Bomin
- MR: Chŏng Pomin

Jung Bo-min (Korean: 정보민; born June 17, 1997) is a South Korean actress.

== Filmography ==
=== Television series ===
List of television series appearances
Year	Title	Role	Notes	Ref.
2021	The All-Round Wife	Han Seul-ah		
2022	Doctor Lawyer	Yang Seon-ae	Cameo (Episode 10)	
2022–2023	The Forbidden Marriage	Hae Young		
2023	The Matchmakers	Maeng Sam-soon		

=== Web series ===
List of web series appearances
Year	Title	Role	Notes	Ref.
2019	Freshman	Yu Rim		
2019	Triple Fling	Lee Se-hee	Season 1–2	
2020	The Mermaid Prince: The Beginning	Maria		
2021	Be My Boyfriend	Joo Min-ji		
