= Kim Soo-jin (actress) =

South Korean actress (born 1974)

- Born: 29 September 1974 (age 52); South Korea
- Education: Hanyang University - Department of Theater and Film
- Occupation: Actress
- Years active: 2001–present
- Agent: Will Entertainment
- Height: 168 cm (5 ft 6 in)

Korean name
- Hangul: 김수진
- RR: Gim Sujin
- MR: Kim Sujin

Kim Soo-jin (Korean: 김수진; born 29 September 1974) is a South Korean actress. She made her big screen debut in 2001, when she appeared in Wanee & Junah. She appeared in a number of hit dramas including School 2017 (2017), Misty (2018), and Watcher (2019).

== Filmography ==
=== Film ===
Year	Title	Role	Notes/Ref.
2001	Wanee & Junah	Young-sook	
2002	Jungle Juice	Reporter	
2004	A Smile	Min-soo's wife	
2006	Good Girl		Short film
2012	Helpless	Jong-geun's wife	
2012	The Tower	Yeong-gi's wife	
2015	The Priests	Father Kim's younger sister	
2016	The Great Actor	Hye-won	
2016	The Tunnel	Public hearing attendee B	
2016	A Break Alone	Gang-jae's wife	
2016	Asura: The City of Madness	Female councilor	
2016	Misbehavior	Female teacher 1	
2016	A Single Rider	Widow	
2017	Heart Blackened	Presiding judge	
2017	1987: When the Day Comes	Yeon-hee's mother	
2018	Unstoppable	Lawyer	
2019	Birthday	Woo-chan's mother	
2020	Secret Zoo	Lawyer Seo	
2020	The Closet	Myung-Jin's mother	
2022	Open the Door		Premiere at 27th BIFF

=== Television series ===
Year	Title	Role	Notes/Ref.
2015	All About My Mom		
2016	Signal	Kim Yoon-Jung's mother	
2016	The Doctors		
2016	The Good Wife		
2016	Don't Dare to Dream	Newsroom staff	
2016	The Legend of the Blue Sea		
2016	Dr. Romantic	Patient's wife	
2017	Naked Fireman		
2017	Suspicious Partner		
2017	School 2017	Oh Sa-rang's mother	
2017	Prison Playbook	Park Joon-young's mother	
2018	Misty	Yoon Song-yi	
2018	Familiar Wife	Jang Man-ok	
2018	Drama Special: "The Tuna and the Dolphin"	Yoon Hwa-jung	
2019	The Crowned Clown	Court Lady Park	
2019	Touch Your Heart	Lee Se-jin	
2019	Save Me 2	Chil-sung's wife	
2019	One Spring Night	Librarian	
2019	Watcher	Yeom Dong-sook	
2019–2020	Hot Stove League	Im Mi-sun	
2020	A Piece of Your Mind	Song Jin-sun	
2020	Sweet Munchies	Cha Joo-hee	
2020	My Unfamiliar Family	Writer	
2020	Tale of the Nine Tailed	Snail Bride / Bok Hye-ja	
2020–2021	Hospital Playlist	Song Su-bin	Season 1–2
2020–2021	Cheat on Me If You Can	Yang Jin-seon	
2021	Undercover	Min Sang-ah	
2021	Navillera	Shim Sung-suk	
2021–2022	School 2021	Jo Yong-mi	
2022	Hunted	Chae-jeong	
2022	Today's Webtoon	Kang Kyung-ja	
2023	Brain Works	Shin Ji-hyung	
2023	Agency	Choi Jung-min	
2023	Tale of the Nine Tailed 1938	Snail Bride / Bok Hye-ja	

=== Web series ===
Year	Title	Role	Ref.
2020	My Holo Love	Nan-do's mother	
2022	Anna	Chief Kim	

== Theater ==
Year	Title
2010	Eleemosynary
2011	Titus
2011	마호로바
2011	Oedipus
2016	The Winter's Tale

== Awards and nominations ==
Name of the award ceremony, year presented, category, nominee of the award, and the result of the nomination
Award ceremony	Year	Category	Nominee / Work	Result	Ref.
MBC Drama Awards	2022	Excellence Award, Actress in a Daily/One-Act Drama	Hunted	Nominated	
SBS Drama Awards	2020	Best Supporting Team (Note: with Ha Do-kwon, Yoon Sun-woo, Kim Soo-jin, Cha-yeop, Lee Jun-hyeok and Jo Han-sun)	Hot Stove League	Won	
