= Sunshine Love =

- Film poster
- Hangul: 썬샤인 러브
- RR: Sseonsyain reobeu
- MR: Ssŏnsyain rŏbŭ
- Directed by: Jo Eun-sung
- Written by: Jo Eun-sung
- Produced by: Lee Jong-ho; Lee Jae-seok
- Starring: Oh Jung-se; Jo Eun-ji
- Cinematography: Jeong Seong-uk
- Edited by: Kim Jeong-hun
- Music by: White Tone
- Production company: Prain Global
- Release dates: July 20, 2013 (Puchon); September 17, 2015 (South Korea)
- Running time: 79 minutes
- Country: South Korea
- Language: Korean

Sunshine Love (Korean: 썬샤인 러브) is a 2013 South Korean romantic comedy film written and directed by Jo Eun-sung, starring Oh Jung-se and Jo Eun-ji.

== Plot ==
Han Gil-ho wants to become a public servant, but so far has failed the civil service exam. His real interest is writing a kung-fu comic book which he has titled I'm a Public Official, featuring a crime-fighting bureaucrat and his two nerdy friends (based on himself and his slacker friends Min-gu and Park). Gil-ho then meets Kim Jung-sook, when he tags along to a meeting where she berates Min-gu into taking responsibility for her pregnant best friend Seung-hee. Gil-ho and Jung-sook realize that they knew each other years ago in college, when she was geeky and similarly hot-tempered and Gil-ho couldn't stand her. After unexpectedly sleeping together after a party, the two begin dating and eventually move in together, with Jung-sook having a regular job as a manager at a water-purifying company. Gil-ho gets an offer from a comic book publisher, but his lack of ambition and inability to commit to anything start to take their toll on their relationship.

== Cast ==
- Oh Jung-se as Han Gil-ho
- Jo Eun-ji as Kim Jung-sook
- Song Sam-dong as Min-gu
- Park Jae-cheol as Park
- Lee Mi-do as Sung-hee
- Kim Geun-ah as Jung-sook's mother

== Critical reception ==
Derek Elley of Film Business Asia gave the film a grade of 7 out of 10, calling it an "unobtrusive, indie-style rom-com" with "two good leads and a likeable tone."
