= Lee Jun-hyeok (actor, born 1972) =

South Korean actor

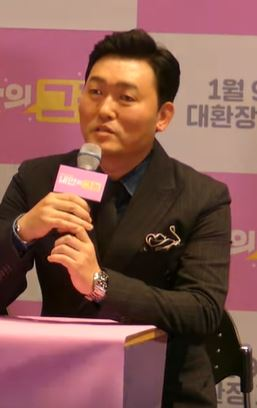
- Lee in 2018
- Born: March 19, 1972 (age 54); Jung District, Seoul, South Korea
- Other name: Lee Joon-hyuk
- Occupation: Actor
- Years active: 1991–present
- Agent: Chang Company
- Spouse: Ji Young-an
- Children: 3

Korean name
- Hangul: 이준혁
- Hanja: 李準赫
- RR: I Junhyeok
- MR: I Chunhyŏk

Lee Jun-hyeok (born March 19, 1972), also known as Lee Joon-hyuk, is a South Korean actor. He is known for his role in the popular television series Love in the Moonlight (2016) for which he won Best Supporting Actor at the 30th KBS Drama Awards.

== Filmography ==
=== Film ===
Year	Title	Role	Notes/Ref.
1991	Mother, Your Son		
2000	A Masterpiece in My Life		
2002	Chow Yun-fat Boy Meets Brownie Girl		
2008	Sunny	Parting soldier 3	
2008	Scandal Makers	Photographer	
2010	Harmony	Doctor in emergency room	
2010	Twilight Gangsters	Industry company owner	
2010	Secret Love	Unfamiliar man	
2010	My Dear Desperado	Final interviewer	
2010	Troubleshooter	DNA team agent	
2010	The Yellow Sea	Dog seller 2	
2011	I Am Alone		Short film
2011	Late Blossom	Photographer	
2011	Animal Town	Oh Seong-cheol	
2011	Sunny	Owner of private detective agency	
2011	Dance Town		
2012	Love Fiction	Professor Jeong	
2012	The Weight	Man in motorcycle helmet	
2012	A Werewolf Boy	Policeman	
2012	Masquerade	Hyeon-gam	
2012	Ghost Sweepers	Killer	
2012	Mai Ratima	Sang-pil	
2012	House With a Good View	Handsome customer	
2012	Grecoroman		Short film
2013	South Bound	Fight teacher 1	
2013	From Seoul to Varanasi		
2013	The Gifted Hands	Yang-soo	
2013	Born to Sing	Job opportunity man	
2013	Montage	Chief detective Shin	
2013	Mr. Go	Leiting/Zeroz	
2013	Hide and Seek	Sang-man	
2013	Jit (Act)		Cameo
2013	Top Star	Sang-chul	
2013	Hwayi: A Monster Boy	Police officer	
2013	The Five	Detective Park	
2013	Friend: The Great Legacy	Jjam-bo	
2014	Tabloid Truth	Nam-soo	
2014	Guardian	Jin-soo	
2014	The Fatal Encounter		
2014	Tazza: The Hidden Card	Benjie	
2014	Slow Video	Team leader Bae	
2014	My Dictator	Gi-cheol	
2014	Men and Women		
2015	Shoot Me in the Heart	Street musician	
2015	Salut d'Amour	Ok Bok-sung	
2015	Enemies In-Law	Delivery man colleague 2	Cameo
2015	The Chronicles of Evil	Lee Myeong-cheon	
2015	The Classified File	Mae Seok-hwan	
2015	Alice in Earnestland	Hyung-suk	
2015	Wonderful Nightmare	Section chief Choi	
2015	Fatal Intuition	Myeong-gyu	
2015	The Advocate: A Missing Body	Gil-dong	
2016	Remember You	Shin Hyun-ho	
2016	A Melody to Remember	Superior Jo	
2016	Phantom Detective	Real estate agency owner	
2016	Seondal: The Man Who Sells the River	Receiver	
2016	A Break Alone	Yeong-chan	
2017	Miss Butcher	Choi Joong-gi	
2017	Lucid Dream	Joo Noh-geun	Cameo
2017	Midnight Runners	Professor Ha	Special appearance
2017	The Mimic	Middle-aged man	
2017	Oh! My God Returns	Loan shark	
2017	Notebook from My Mother		
2017	Bean Sprouts	Deputy Kim	
2018	Golden Slumber	Plastic surgeon	Cameo
2018	Be with You	Instructor Choi	
2018	Notebook from My Mother	Jung-ho	
2018	Along with the Gods: The Last 49 Days	Judge	
2019	Rosebud	Chief Oh	
2019	The Dude In Me	Man Chul	
2019	Underdog	Hunter	
2019	Innocent Witness	Yoon-jae	Special appearance
2019	Trade Your Love	Wedding studio photographer	
2020	Hitman: Agent Jun	Foreman	
2022	6/45	Yoon Jong-goo	
2022	Come Back Home	Pil-sung	
2022	Hansan: Rising Dragon	Hwang Park	
2022	Birth	Ministry of Justice official	
2022	Reverse		Cameo; sound film
2023	Rebound	Lee Soon-saeng	
2024	Idiot Girls and School Ghost: School Anniversary	School Nurse	Cameo
TBA	Mismatch	Sang-yeong	

=== Television series ===
Year	Title	Role	Notes
2011	Vampire Prosecutor	Gambler	Cameo, episode 8
2011	KBS Drama Special	I.T. guy	Episode "Strawberry Ice Cream"
2011	Quiz of God 2	Go Jong-do	Cameo
2012	Queen and I	Taxi Driver	Cameo, episode 13
2013	Nine	Sang-beom	
2013	The Queen of Office	Han Jung-soo	
2013	Blue Tower 2	Lee Jun-hyeok	
2013	Marry Him If You Dare		
2014	Angel Eyes	Suicidal Man	Cameo, episode 4
2014	Hi! School: Love On	Ha Dong-geun	
2014	Golden Tower	Lee Joon-hyuk	
2014	The Three Musketeers		
2014	Plus Nine Boys		
2014	Misaeng: Incomplete Life	Team 3	Cameo, episode 1
2014	Liar Game	Criminal	
2014	Dr. Frost		Cameo, episode 1
2015	Hyde Jekyll, Me	Detective Na	
2015	Divorce Lawyer in Love	Nam Gye-jin	
2015	Six Flying Dragons	Hong Dae-hong	
2016	Puck!	Im Wan-yong	
2016	Mrs. Cop 2	Bae Dae-hoon	
2016	The Doctors	Boss' subordinate	Cameo, episode 1,3-5
2016	Come Back Mister	Customer at the department store	Cameo, episode 6
2016	Love in the Moonlight	Eunuch Jang	
2016	Wanted		Cameo
2016	Justice Team	Real Estate Agent	Cameo; Web drama
2017	The Rebel	Hong Yong-gae	
2017	Voice	Pimp	
2017	Man to Man	Director Lee Hyuk-joon	
2017	KBS Drama Special	Lee Joon-hyeok	Episode "If We Were a Season"
2017	KBS Drama Special	Kim Jung-kuk	Episode "Bad Families"
2017	My Father Is Strange	Na Young-shik	
2017	Mad Dog	Jo Han-woo	
2018	Misty	Jung Ki-chan	
2018	100 Days My Prince	Park Bok-eun	
2018	Big Forest	Judge	
2018	Bad Papa	Kim Pil-doo	
2018	My Secret Terrius	Kang Do-ryung	
2019	Touch Your Heart	Yoon Jeon-seok	
2019	Welcome to Waikiki 2	Director with amnesia	Cameo, episode 1
2019	Doctor Prisoner	Go Young-cheol	
2019	The Wind Blows	Choi Hang-seo	
2019	Nokdu Flower	Hong Dae-hong	Cameo, episode 13-14
2019	Class of Lies	CEO trying to steal a yongdoli mask patent	Cameo, episode 1
2019	The Lies Within	Yoo Dae-yong	
2019	Catch the Ghost	Chief Gong	
2019	Hot Stove League	Go Se-hyeok	
2020	Itaewon Class	Park Joon-gi	Cameo, episode 11-13
2020	Mystic Pop-up Bar	Chief Yeom	
2020	My Dangerous Wife	Seo Ji-tae	
2020	SF8	Chief	Episode "Blink"
2020	Birthcare Center	Yang Joon-seok	Cameo, episode 2
2021	Bossam: Steal the Fate	Chun-bae	
2021	The Veil	Chairman Shin Su-yong	
2021	Racket Boys	Banjang Yu	Cameo, episode 6
2021	My Roommate Is a Gumiho	Professor Park Bo-gum	Cameo, episode 14
2021	Happiness	Kim Jung-kook	
2022	Good Job	Chief Hong Man-soo	
2022	Alchemy of Souls: Light and Shadow	A merchant	
2023	The Secret Romantic Guesthouse	Noh Seong-gil	Cameo, episode 1
2023	Call It Love	Kang Nam-il	
2023	Joseon Attorney	Master Jang	
2023	Moon in the Day	Go Kyung-se	
2023–2024	The Story of Park's Marriage Contract	Hwang Myeong-su	

=== Television shows ===
Year	Title	Role	Notes	Ref.
2021	The Villager Lover	Cast Member		

== Awards and nominations ==
Year	Award	Category	Nominated work	Result	Ref.
2016	KBS Drama Awards	Best Supporting Actor	Love in the Moonlight	Won	
2020	SBS Drama Awards	Best Supporting Team (Note: with Ha Do-kwon, Yoon Sun-woo, Kim Soo-jin, Cha-yeop, Lee Jun-hyeok and Jo Han-sun)	Hot Stove League	Won	
