= Oh Jung-se =

South Korean actor (born 1977)

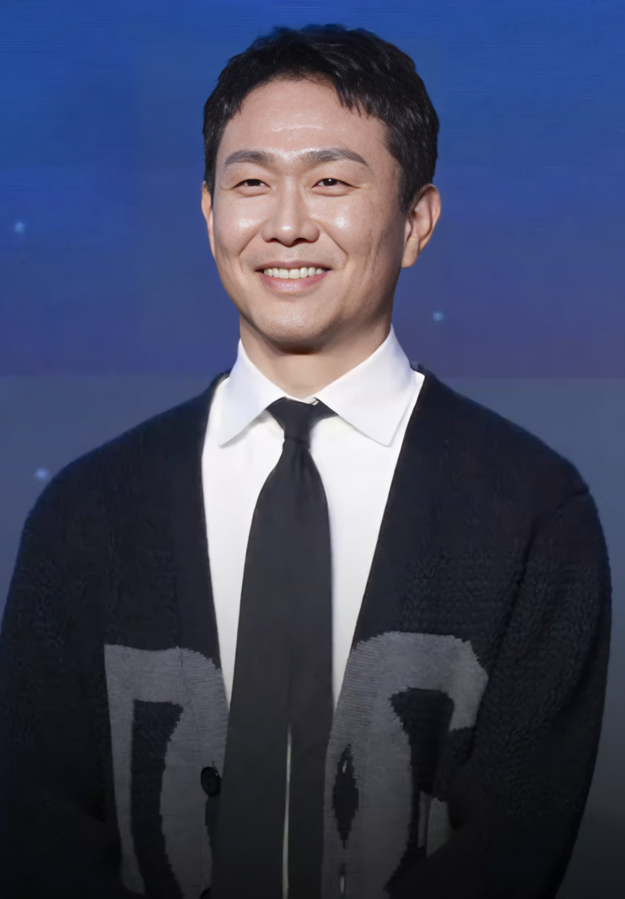
- Oh in November 2024
- Born: February 26, 1977 (age 49); Uiryeong County, South Gyeongsang Province, South Korea
- Education: Sun Moon University (Mass Communications)
- Occupation: Actor
- Years active: 1997–present
- Agent: Prain TPC
- Spouse: Ahn Hee-seon (m. 2006)
- Children: 2

Korean name
- Hangul: 오정세
- RR: O Jeongse
- MR: O Chŏngse

Oh Jung-se (Korean: 오정세; born February 26, 1977) is a South Korean actor. He is best known for his lead roles in the television series It's Okay to Not Be Okay (2020), Uncle (2021), Revenant (2023), Mr. Plankton (2024), and Good Boy (2025), as well as the film Swing Kids (2018) and Hi-Five (2025). He won Best Supporting Actor – Television at the Baeksang Arts Awards for two consecutive years in 2020 and 2021.

== Life and career ==
=== 1997–2014: Beginnings ===
Oh Jung-se was born on February 26, 1977. He has been active in the entertainment industry since his debut in the 1997 film Father. He has appeared in various works, including plays, movies, dramas, and music videos. Despite mostly playing minor and supporting roles, he has gained popularity as a "scene stealer" in movies such as Introducing My Girlfriend, Ghosts Live, You Are My Destiny, Love, That Unbearable Lightness, Our Happy Time, Mudori, Dungfly, Bangjajeon, and Cheap Romance.

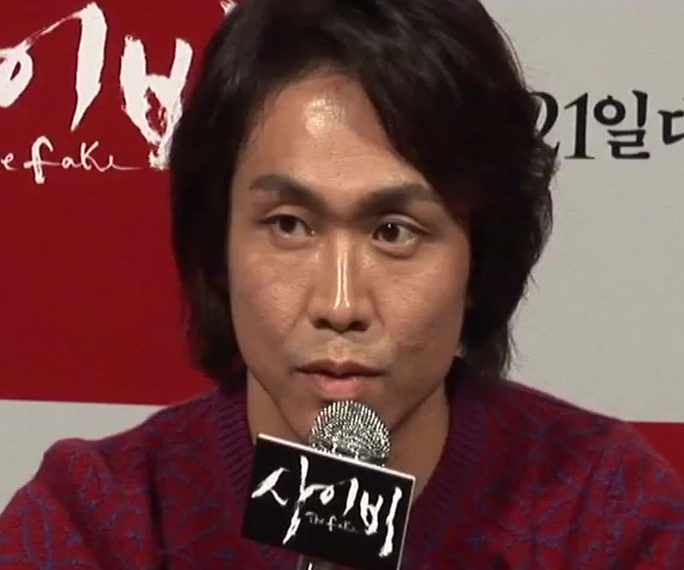
Oh in 2013

He appeared in the 2010 film Unjust, directed by Ryoo Seung-wan, where he played a corrupt reporter who accepts entertainment and bribes from prosecutors and writes articles to suit his taste. In 2012, Oh gained popularity portraying the character of Lee Seung-jae, a Hallyu top star, in the film Man's Manual alongside Lee Si-young. Two years later, he appeared in the 2014 film Tazza: God's Hand, where he played the cold villain Chief Seo.

=== 2017–present: Rising popularity and acclaim ===
In 2017, Oh became popular and gained critical praise for his portrayal of Min Cheon-sang, a lawyer on the brink of madness in the film Fabricated City. In 2019, Oh gained critical praise for his portrayal of Ted Chiang, the leader of a drug organization, in the film Extreme Job. That year, Oh also appeared in the television series When the Camellia Blooms as Noh Gyu-tae and Hot Stove League as Kwon Kyung-min. For the roles, he won the 2019 KBS Drama Awards for Best Supporting Actor and Best Couple in the mid-length drama category, the 2020 Baeksang Arts Award for Male Supporting Actor in the television category, and the Best Character Award at the SBS Drama Awards.

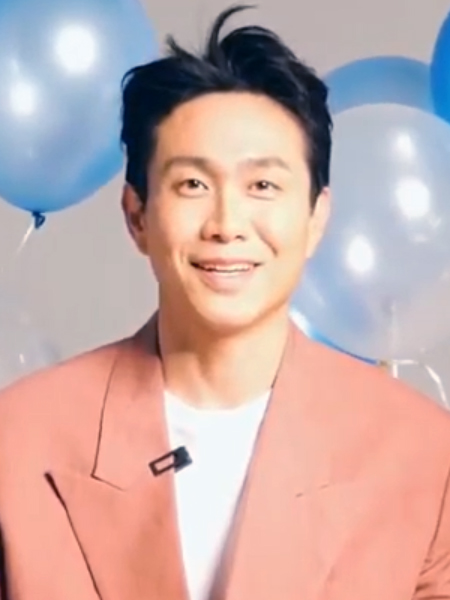
Oh in 2020

Oh played the character of Moon Sang-tae, an artistic genius with autism, in the tvN television series It's Okay to Not be Okay. His portrayal earned him favorable reviews from the audience and the Baeksang Arts Award for Male Supporting Actor in the television category.

In 2023, Oh Jung-se demonstrated his versatility by playing two contrasting roles. Oh starred alongside Kim Tae-ri and Hong Kyung in the SBS occult thriller Revenant, where he portrayed Yeom Hae-sang, a stoic folklore professor gifted with the supernatural ability. He also starred in Kim Jee-woon's film Cobweb as Kang Ho-se, a flamboyant and popular playboy actor serving as the movie Cobweb male protagonist. For the latter, Oh received a best supporting actor nominations at the 44th Blue Dragon Film Awards and won at the 59th Grand Bell Awards.

In Netflix original series Mr. Plankton, Oh acted as Eo Heungo, the son of the 500-year-old ancient Eo clan's main family.

In 2025, Oh starred in one film and four dramas. He made a special appearance in Lim Sang-choon's drama When Life Gives You Tangerines, as Yeom Byeong-chul, Ae-soon's stepfather. In May 2025, Oh starred in the Shim Na-yeon-directed action-comedy series Good Boy alongside Park Bo-gum.

== Personal life ==
=== Marriage and family ===
His wife met in elementary school and married after 19 years of dating. They have two children.

=== Health ===
In 2020, Oh revealed in a television show that he suffers of prosopagnosia.

== Filmography ==
Key
†	Denotes films that have not yet been released

=== Film ===
Year	Title	Role	Notes	Ref.
1997	Father			
2001	Address Unknown			
2003	Here I Am!		Short film	
2003	Into the Mirror			
2003	Oh! Brothers			
2004	Windstruck	Police corporal Jo / Prince		
2004	Face	Min-ho		
2004	Ghost House			
2005	Red Eye			
2005	Short Time			
2005	You Are My Sunshine			
2005	Diary of June	Pickpocket		
2005	Always Behind You			
2006	One Shining Day			
2006	Between Love and Hate	Tae-gu		
2006	Maundy Thursday	Teacher Kim		
2006	Moodori	Wild goose		
2006	Sundays in August			
2006	Solace	Mi-ran's lover		
2006	The World of Silence	Change-bae		
2007	Carnival		Short film	
2007	Herb	Street stall owner		
2007	Beautiful Sunday	Yoo Chang-won		
2007	The Show Must Go On	Manager		
2007	Paradise Murdered	Detective Lee		
2007	The Railroad	Broadcasting station PD		
2008	Radio Dayz	Man-chul		
2008	My Mighty Princess	Police officer Kim		
2008	My Wife Got Married	Byeong-soo		
2008	Love Is Protein	Hong-chan	Animated short film	
2008	The Dream of Cortazar		Short film	
2009	Breathless	Black noodle man		
2009	Insadong Scandal	Keun-bok		
2009	Secret	Kyeong-ho		
2010	Mirror, Mirror		Short film	
2010	Bestseller	Middle-aged man 3		
2010	The Servant	City official Ho-bang		
2010	The Unjust	Journalist Kim		
2010	Petty Romance	Hae-ryong		
2011	Quick	Park Dal-yong		
2011	Couples	Bok-nam		
2011	The King of Pigs	adult Hwang Kyung-min	Animated (voice)	
2011	Perfect Game	Sports commentator		
2012	Over My Dead Body	Myung-kwan		
2012	As One	Doo-man		
2012	A Millionaire On the Run	Kang Pil-soo		
2012	Waiting for Jang Joon-hwan	Jung-se	Short film	
2013	How to Use Guys with Secret Tips	Lee Seung-jae		
2013	Behind the Camera	Himself		
2013	Running Man	Jang Do-sik		
2013	Do You Remember Me?		3D short film	
2013	The Hero	Joo-yeon/Thunder Man		
2013	The Fake	Sung Chul-woo	Animated (voice)	
2014	Broken	Voice on the radio	Cameo	
2014	Man on High Heels	Heo-gon		
2014	Tazza: The Hidden Card	Director Seo		
2014	Red Carpet	Jo Jin-hwan		
2015	Sunshine Love	Han Gil-ho		
2016	Life Risking Romance	Heo Jong-goo		
2017	Fabricated City	Min Chun-sang		
2018	Snatch Up	Parcel delivery man		
2018	Swing Kids	Kang Byung-sam		
2019	Rosebud	Soon-cheol		
2019	Extreme Job	Ted Chang		
2020	The Call	Sung-ho		
2021	Dispatch; I Don’t Fire Myself	Seo Choong-sik		
2021	Perhaps Love	Nam Jin	Special appearance	
2022	Seoul Vibe	Ahn Pyung-wook	Netflix film	
2023	Switch	Jo Yoon		
2023	Killing Romance		Special appearance	
2023	Cobweb	Kang Ho-se		
2023	Honey Sweet	Mo Seol-nam		
2025	Hi-Five	Park Jong-min		
2026	Wild Sing	Sung-gon		
2027	Typhoon †	Sang-hyuk		

=== Television series ===
Year	Title	Role	Notes	Ref.
2006	Someday	Seo Jung-joon		
2008	Tazza	Kwang-tae		
2010	Blossom Sisters	Jae-hoon		
2011	The Musical	Goo-jak		
2012	Missing You	Joo Jung-myung		
2013	March: A Story of Friends	Himself		
2013	Waiting for Love	Philip		
2013	Marry Him If You Dare	Na Joo-hyun		
2013	Miss Korea	Kim Heung-sam		
2014	KBS Drama Special – "I'm Dying Soon"	Woo-jin		
2014	A New Leaf	Park Sang-tae		
2014	Plus Nine Boys	Gu Kwang-soo		
2014	Misaeng: Incomplete Life	Husband of Chungsol's CEO	Cameo (episode 20)	
2015	The Lover	Oh Do-si		
2016	The Vampire Detective	Yong Goo-Hyung		
2016	Entertainer	Prosecutor	Cameo (episode 7, 9)	
2016	A Beautiful Mind	Kang Hyun Joon		
2016	Night Light			
2017	Missing 9	Jung Gi-joon		
2017	Distorted	Han Chul-ho		
2018	Mistress	Kim Young-dae		
2019	Touch Your Heart	Yeon Joon-kyu		
2019	Flower Crew: Joseon Marriage Agency	Kang Cheon-joo	Cameo	
2019	When the Camellia Blooms	No Gyu-tae		
2019–2020	Hot Stove League	Kwon Kyung-min		
2020	It's Okay to Not Be Okay	Moon Sang-tae		
2020–2022	The Good Detective	Oh Jong-tae	Main role (season 1); Guest (season 2)	
2021	My Roommate Is a Gumiho	Do Jae-jin's elder brother	Cameo (episode 15)	
2021	Jirisan	Jeong Gu-young		
2021–2022	Uncle	Wang Jun-hyeok		
2022	Little Women	Director Shin / Shin Hyun-min	Cameo (episode 1–3, 6)	
2023	Revenant	Yeom Hae-sang		
2023–2024	Sweet Home	Dr. Lim	Season 2–3	
2023–2024	Death's Game	Ahn Ji-hyung	Cameo	
2024	Queen of Tears	Lee Min-woo	Cameo	
2024	Mr. Plankton	Eo Heung		
2025	When the Stars Gossip	Kang Kang-su		
2025	When Life Gives You Tangerines	Yeom Byeong-cheol	Cameo	
2025	Good Boy	Min Ju-young		
2025	Tempest	Jang Jun-sang		
2026	Climax	Kwon Jong-wook		
2026	We Are All Trying Here	Park Gyeong-se		
2026	Fifties Professionals	Bong Je-soon		

=== Music video appearances ===
Year	Title	Artist	Ref.
2011	"Lucky Guy"	Kim Hyun-joong	

== Theater ==
Year	Title	Role
2002-2004	Barber Park Bong-gu	Detective/Deok-soo/Chairman/Guest
2005-2006	One Shot Liar	Stanley

== Discography ==
=== Soundtrack appearances ===
Year	Song title	Notes
2011	"Our Love Shines" (빛나라 우리 사랑아) (sung with Gong Hyung-jin, Kim Joo-hyuk, Lee Si-young, Lee Yoon-ji)	track from Couples OST

== Accolades ==
=== Awards and nominations ===
Name of the award ceremony, year presented, category, nominee of the award, and the result of the nomination
Award ceremony	Year	Category	Nominee / Work	Result	Ref.
APAN Star Awards	2021	Best Supporting Actor	It's Okay to Not Be Okay, Hot Stove League	Won	
Baeksang Arts Awards	2020	Best Supporting Actor – Television	When the Camellia Blooms	Won	
Baeksang Arts Awards	2021	Best Supporting Actor – Television	It's Okay to Not Be Okay	Won	
Blue Dragon Film Awards	2023	Best Supporting Actor	Cobweb	Nominated	
Blue Dragon Film Awards	2026	Best Supporting Actor	Wild Sing	Pending	
Buil Film Awards	2026	Best Supporting Actor	Wild Sing	Nominated	
Daejeon Special Effects Film Festival (DFX OTT Awards)	2026	Excellence Award in Acting	We Are All Trying Here	Won	
Global OTT Awards	2025	Best Supporting Actor	Good Boy	Won	
Grand Bell Awards	2023	Best Supporting Actor	Cobweb	Won	
KBS Drama Awards	2019	Best Supporting Actor	When the Camellia Blooms	Won	
KBS Drama Awards	2019	Netizen Award, Actor	When the Camellia Blooms	Nominated	
KBS Drama Awards	2019	Best Couple Award	Oh Jung-se (with Yeom Hye-ran); When the Camellia Blooms	Won	
Korea Drama Awards	2023	Top Excellence Award, Actor	Revenant	Won	
Korea Drama Awards	2025	Villain Award	Good Boy	Won	
Korea First Brand Awards	2026	Actor – Scene Stealer	Oh Jung-se	Won	
Korean Association of Film Critics Awards	2026	Best Supporting Actor	Wild Sing	Won	
Korean Film Producers Association Award	2019	Best Supporting Actor	Swing Kids	Won	
MBC Drama Awards	2017	Golden Acting Award, Actor in a Miniseries	Missing 9	Won	
SBS Drama Awards	2020	Excellence Award, Actor in a Miniseries Action Drama	Hot Stove League	Nominated	
SBS Drama Awards	2020	Best Character Award, Actor	Hot Stove League	Won	
SBS Drama Awards	2023	Top Excellence Award, Actor in a Miniseries Genre/Action Drama	Revenant	Nominated	
Wildflower Film Awards	2021	Best Actor	Dispatch; I Don’t Fire Myself	Nominated	

=== State honors ===
Name of country, year given, and name of honor
Country	Year	Honor	Ref.
South Korea (Note: Honors are given at the Korean Popular Culture and Arts Awards, arranged by the Korea Creative Content Agency and hosted by the Ministry of Culture, Sports and Tourism. They are awarded to those who have contributed to the arts and South Korea's pop culture.)	2021	Minister of Culture, Sports and Tourism Commendation	

=== Listicles ===
Name of publisher, year listed, name of listicle, and placement
Publisher	Year	Listicle	Placement	Ref.
Korean Film Council	2021	Korean Actors 200 (Note: Introduces 200 actors that best represent the present and future of Korean cinema to the people in the film industry all over the world.)	Included	
