= Good Casting =

2020 South Korean television series

- Promotional poster
- Hangul: 굿캐스팅
- RR: Gutkaeseuting
- MR: Kutk'aesŭt'ing
- Genre: Action; Comedy
- Created by: SBS Drama Headquarters
- Written by: Park Ji-ha
- Directed by: Choi Young-hoon
- Starring: Choi Kang-hee; Yoo In-young; Kim Ji-young; Lee Sang-yeob; Lee Jun-young; Lee Jong-hyuk
- Country of origin: South Korea
- Original language: Korean
- No. of episodes: 16

Production
- Producer: Park Hae-sun
- Running time: 60 minutes
- Production company: Box Media Corporation

Original release
- Network: SBS TV
- Release: April 27 – June 16, 2020

Good Casting (Korean: 굿캐스팅) is a 2020 South Korean television series starring Choi Kang-hee, Yoo In-young, Kim Ji-young, Lee Sang-yeob, Lee Jun-young and Lee Jong-hyuk. It aired on SBS TV from April 27 to June 16, 2020.

== Synopsis ==
Legendary espionage agents give girl power a whole new meaning in this thrilling action comedy. Once part of South Korea's top secret National Intelligence Service, a group of talented female agents are reassigned to go undercover in a case involving corruption and leaked trade secrets at the country's largest conglomerate. After several mistakes during important missions, Baek Chan Mi (Choi Kang Hee) was reassigned to the cybersecurity team, but dreams of returning to her former role. Hwang Mi Soon has left agent life behind and became a full-time homemaker. Meanwhile, Lim Ye Eun, a smart single mom and desk agent dreams of being promoted to an undercover spymaster working in the field. Their lives collide when Don Kwan Soo, a longtime director in the NIS, recruits all three for a do or die mission.

== Cast ==
=== Main ===
- Choi Kang-hee as Baek Chan-mi / Baek Jang-mi
- Yoo In-young as Im Ye-eun / Im Jung-eun
- Kim Ji-young as Hwang Mi-soon / Gi Mi-sun
- Lee Sang-yeob as Yoon Seok-ho
- Lee Jun-young as Kang Woo-won
- Lee Jong-hyuk as Dong Kwan-soo

=== Supporting ===
==== National Intelligence Service ====
- Jung In-gi as Seo Gook-hwan
- Park Kyung-soon as Bae Moo-hyuk
- Hwang Bo-mi as Gan Tae-hee
- Kim Jin-ho as Geum Dong-seok

==== Il Kwang Hitech ====
- Woo Hyun as Myung Gye-chul
- Lee Sang-hoon as Tak Sang-gi
- Kim Yong-hee as Ok Chul
- as Byun Woo-seok
- Han Soo-jin as Assistant Goo
- Jo Young-hoon as Seol Young-hoon
- Kim Kyung-sook as Park Kyung-sook

==== Main's entourage ====
- Cha Soo-yeon as Shim Hwa-ran
- Lee Seung-hyung as Nam Bong-man
- Yoon Sa-bong as Prison boss
- Kim Bo-yoon as Nam Joo-yeon
- Bae Jin-woong as Pi Chul-woong
- Sung Hyuk as Kwon Min-seok
- Noh Ha-yeon as Kwon So-hee

== Production ==
=== Development ===
The series is based on a screenplay which was one of the winners of the 2016 2H MBC Drama Screenplay Competition (miniseries category), alongside the 2019–20 SBS television series Hot Stove League.

Early working title of the series is Miscasting (Korean: 미스캐스팅; RR: Miseukaeseuting). Director Choi Young-hoon first wanted to name the series that way because the characters are miscasted for the operation, but he changed it to Good Casting as all three actresses showed good team work.

=== Filming ===
The series is entirely pre-produced. Filming ended on February 7, 2020.

== Original soundtrack ==
Good Casting OST

Soundtrack album by Various Artists
- Released: 2020
- Genre: Soundtrack
- Languages: Korean; English
- Labels: SBS Content Hub; Vlending Co., Ltd.

=== Part 1 ===
Released on May 4, 2020
No.	Title	Lyrics	Music	Artist	Length
1.	"Feel It!"	Kim Min-jae; Yoon Kyung-won	Kim Chang-rak; Kim Soo-bin; Cho Se-hee	Cheetah	2:39
2.	"Feel It!" (Inst.)		Kim Chang-rak; Kim Soo-bin; Cho Se-hee		2:39
Total length:					5:18

=== Part 2 ===
Released on May 11, 2020
No.	Title	Lyrics	Music	Artist	Length
1.	"The Day" (그날)	Zigzag Note; Moonc	Zigzag Note; Moon Sang-sun	Lee Min-hyuk	4:34
2.	"The Day" (Inst.)		Zigzag Note; Moon Sang-sun		4:34
Total length:					9:08

=== Part 3 ===
Released on May 18, 2020
No.	Title	Lyrics	Music	Artist	Length
1.	"Let's Make Love" (사랑하자)	Major League	Major League	Lee Jun-young; Soyeon (Laboum)	3:45
2.	"Let's Make Love" (Inst.)		Major League		3:45
Total length:					7:30

=== Part 4 ===
Released on May 25, 2020
No.	Title	Lyrics	Music	Artist	Length
1.	"Red Bag" (빨간 책가방)	Park Ji-ha; Choi Young-hoon	Zinhadi	Lee Sang-yeob	2:49
2.	"Red Bag" (Inst.)		Zinhadi		2:49
Total length:					5:38

=== Part 5 ===
Released on June 15, 2020
No.	Title	Lyrics	Music	Artist	Length
1.	"Maybe Love"	ZigZag Note; Lee Shin-sung	ZigZag Note; Kim Sun-woong	Lee Shin-sung	3:31
2.	"Maybe Love" (Inst.)		ZigZag Note; Kim Sun-woong		3:31
Total length:					7:03

== Viewership ==
Good Casting : South Korea viewers per episode (millions)

Season	Episode number																Average
Season	1	2	3	4	5	6	7	8	9	10	11	12	13	14	15	16	Average
1	2.183	1.986	1.780	2.186	1.993	1.746	1.660	1.648	1.515	1.606	1.529	1.505	1.585	1.615	1.566	1.782	1.743

Source: Audience measurement performed nationwide by Nielsen Korea.

Average TV viewership ratings
Ep.	Part	Original broadcast date	Average audience share		
Ep.	Part	Original broadcast date	Nielsen Korea		TNmS
Ep.	Part	Original broadcast date	Nationwide	Seoul	Nationwide
1	1	April 27, 2020	9.5% (7th)	10.5% (5th)	8.5% (11th)
1	2	April 27, 2020	12.3% (4th)	13.2% (3rd)	9.5% (8th)
2	1	April 28, 2020	9.8% (5th)	10.9% (5th)	9.5% (8th)
2	2	April 28, 2020	10.8% (4th)	11.8% (4th)	9.8% (7th)
3	1	May 4, 2020	8.5% (8th)	9.4% (5th)	7.7% (11th)
3	2	May 4, 2020	9.8% (5th)	10.8% (4th)	9.2% (7th)
4	1	May 5, 2020	8.7% (8th)	9.9% (6th)	8.7% (9th)
4	2	May 5, 2020	11.1% (5th)	12.8% (3rd)	10.5% (6th)
5	1	May 11, 2020	8.6% (7th)	9.3% (5th)	7.9% (10th)
5	2	May 11, 2020	10.3% (4th)	11.1% (4th)	9.3% (8th)
6	1	May 12, 2020	8.4% (7th)	9.2% (5th)	8.5% (10th)
6	2	May 12, 2020	9.2% (5th)	10.0% (4th)	9.3% (6th)
7	1	May 18, 2020	7.6% (11th)	8.3% (8th)	7.8% (11th)
7	2	May 18, 2020	9.1% (5th)	9.9% (4th)	9.1% (8th)
8	1	May 19, 2020	7.4% (9th)	8.8% (7th)	7.5% (10th)
8	2	May 19, 2020	8.5% (6th)	10.0% (5th)	8.6% (9th)
9	1	May 25, 2020	6.9% (9th)	7.5% (9th)	6.7% (13th)
9	2	May 25, 2020	8.5% (7th)	9.4% (6th)	8.2% (8th)
10	1	May 26, 2020	7.1% (7th)	7.6% (6th)	7.0% (12th)
10	2	May 26, 2020	8.7% (5th)	9.4% (4th)	8.2% (7th)
11	1	June 1, 2020	6.5% (13th)	6.9% (11th)	6.8% (11th)
11	2	June 1, 2020	8.0% (6th)	8.2% (6th)	7.7% (9th)
12	1	June 2, 2020	7.1% (9th)	7.8% (7th)	6.6% (10th)
12	2	June 2, 2020	8.3% (5th)	9.0% (5th)	7.9% (7th)
13	1	June 8, 2020	6.1% (12th)	6.8% (8th)	5.7% (13th)
13	2	June 8, 2020	8.4% (6th)	9.4% (5th)	7.8% (7th)
14	1	June 9, 2020	6.7% (8th)	7.3% (7th)	6.1% (12th)
14	2	June 9, 2020	8.5% (6th)	9.3% (5th)	7.9% (8th)
15	1	June 15, 2020	6.6% (8th)	7.3% (8th)	6.3% (12th)
15	2	June 15, 2020	8.1% (7th)	8.9% (6th)	7.6% (9th)
16	1	June 16, 2020	7.9% (6th)	8.6% (6th)	6.5% (12th)
16	2	June 16, 2020	9.8% (4th)	11.0% (3rd)	8.2% (7th)
Average			8.5%	9.4%	8.0%
In the table above, the blue numbers represent the lowest ratings and the red numbers represent the highest ratings.

== Awards and nominations ==
Name of the award ceremony, year presented, category, nominee of the award, and the result of the nomination
Award ceremony	Year	Category	Nominee / Work	Result	Ref.
SBS Drama Awards	2020	Top Excellence Award, Actor in a Miniseries Genre/Action Drama	Lee Sang-yeob	Nominated	
SBS Drama Awards	2020	Top Excellence Award, Actress in a Miniseries Genre/Action Drama	Choi Kang-hee	Nominated	
SBS Drama Awards	2020	Excellence Award, Actor in a Miniseries Genre/Action Drama	Lee Jong-hyuk	Nominated	
SBS Drama Awards	2020	Excellence Award, Actress in a Miniseries Genre/Action Drama	Kim Ji-young	Nominated	
SBS Drama Awards	2020	Best Character Award, Actress	Choi Kang-hee	Won	
SBS Drama Awards	2020	Best New Actor	Lee Jun-young	Nominated	
