= Jo Eun-ji =

South Korean actress (born 1981)

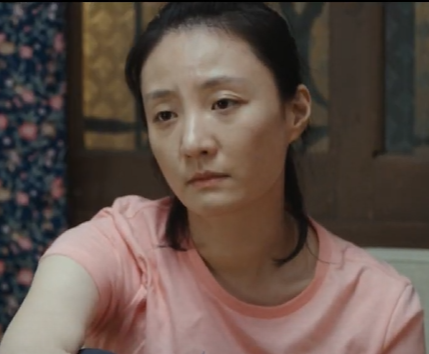
- Jo in 2019
- Born: February 10, 1981 (age 45); South Korea
- Other name: Cho Eun-ji
- Occupation: Actress
- Years active: 2000–present
- Agent: Prain TPC
- Spouse: Park Jung-min (m. 2014)

Korean name
- Hangul: 조은지
- Hanja: 趙恩智
- RR: Jo Eunji
- MR: Cho Ŭnji

Jo Eun-ji (Korean: 조은지; born February 10, 1981) is a South Korean actress. She debuted in the gritty Im Sang-soo film Tears, and has since become better known for her supporting roles on film and television, such as in The President's Last Bang, My Scary Girl, Forever the Moment, The Concubine, and The Villainess. She was also the leading actress in the indies Driving with My Wife's Lover, and Sunshine Love.

== Personal life ==
Jo Eun-ji married Park Jung-min, CEO of talent agency Prain TPC, on May 24, 2014. They met in 2006 when Park became Jo's manager, and they began dating in 2009.

== Filmography ==
=== Film ===
Year	Title	Role	Notes/Ref.
2001	Tears	Ran	
2002	A.F.R.I.K.A.	Young-mi	
2002	Who R. U.?	Choi Bo-young / ID: "Porn Queen"	
2002	A Bizarre Love Triangle	Bae Eun-hee	
2004	The Hotel Venus	Soda	
2005	The President's Last Bang	Banquet guest	
2005	Mr. Housewife	Beautician	Cameo
2006	My Scary Girl	Baek Jang-mi	
2007	Driving with My Wife's Lover	So-ok, Joong-shik's wife	
2007	Femme Fatal	Eun-ji	Cameo
2008	Forever the Moment	Oh Soo-hee	
2009	Why Did You Come to Our House?	Fellow homeless woman	Cameo
2009	Yoga	In-soon	
2009	Short! Short! Short! 2009: Show Me the Money	Park Eun-shil	segment: "Hundred Nails and a Deer Antler"
2009	Fish Boy	Ji-hyun	
2009	Fly, Penguin	Art teacher	Cameo
2009	Girlfriends	Hyun-joo	
2010	Petty Romance	Awards ceremony secretary	Cameo
2012	The Concubine	Geum-ok	
2012	정지우x김무열x조은지 Project		Short film
2012	Confession of Murder	Choi Kang-sook	
2013	Running Man	Park Sun-young	
2014	The Target	Park Soo-jin	
2014	How to Steal a Dog	Chae-rang's mother	
2015	Sunshine Love	Kim Jung-sook	
2017	The Villainess	Kim Sun	
2017	True Fiction	Ji-eun	Special appearance
2021	Perhaps Love	Debut as director	
2022	Day and the Moon	Mag-ha	

=== Television series ===
Year	Title	Role	Network
2003	The Bean Chaff of My Life	Seo Kyung-sun	MBC
2004	More Beautiful Than a Flower	Je-in	KBS2
2004	Lovers in Paris	Lee Yang-mi	SBS
2005	18 vs. 29	Yoo Hye-won	KBS2
2007	Two Outs in the Ninth Inning	Kim Choon-hee	MBC
2010	Personal Taste	Lee Young-sun	MBC
2014	The Greatest Marriage	Park Seon-nyeo	TV Chosun
2015	Beating Again	Na Ok-hyun	JTBC
2015	Let's Eat 2	Hong In-ah	tvN
2015	Oh My Venus	Lee Hyun-Woo	KBS2
2016	Entertainer	Site manager (Guest appearance, Ep. 10)	SBS
2016	Madame Antoine	Yoo-seon / Emma (Special appearance)	JTBC
2021	Lost	Sun-gyu	JTBC
2023	Strangers Again	Kang Bi-chwi	ENA

== Discography ==
Year	Song title	Artist	Notes
2002	"Bed's End" (Original Version)	Jo Eun-ji and Gong Hyo-jin	Track from A Bizarre Love Triangle OST
2009	"Milkyway"	HybRefine feat. Jo Eun-ji	Single

== Awards and nominations ==
Year	Award	Category	Nominated work	Result	Ref.
2001	22nd Blue Dragon Film Awards	Best New Actress	Tears	Nominated	
2007	6th Korean Film Awards	Best Supporting Actress	Driving with My Wife's Lover	Nominated	
2008	16th Chunsa Film Art Awards	Best New Actress	Forever the Moment	Won	
2008	7th Korean Film Awards	Best Supporting Actress	Forever the Moment	Nominated	
2013	49th Baeksang Arts Awards	Best Supporting Actress	The Concubine	Won	
2022	58th Baeksang Arts Awards	Best New Director	Perhaps Love	Won	
2022	Chunsa Film Art Awards 2022	Best New Director	Perhaps Love	Nominated	
2022	31st Buil Film Awards	Best New Director	Perhaps Love	Nominated	
2022	Beautiful Artist Awards (Shin Young-kyun Arts and Culture Foundation)	New Artist Award	Perhaps Love	Won	
2022	58th Grand Bell Awards	Best New Director	Perhaps Love	Nominated	
2022	43rd Blue Dragon Film Awards	Best New Director	Perhaps Love	Nominated	
2022	9th Korean Film Producers Association Award	Best New Director	Perhaps Love	Won	
