= Yoon Sun-woo =

South Korean actor (born 1985)

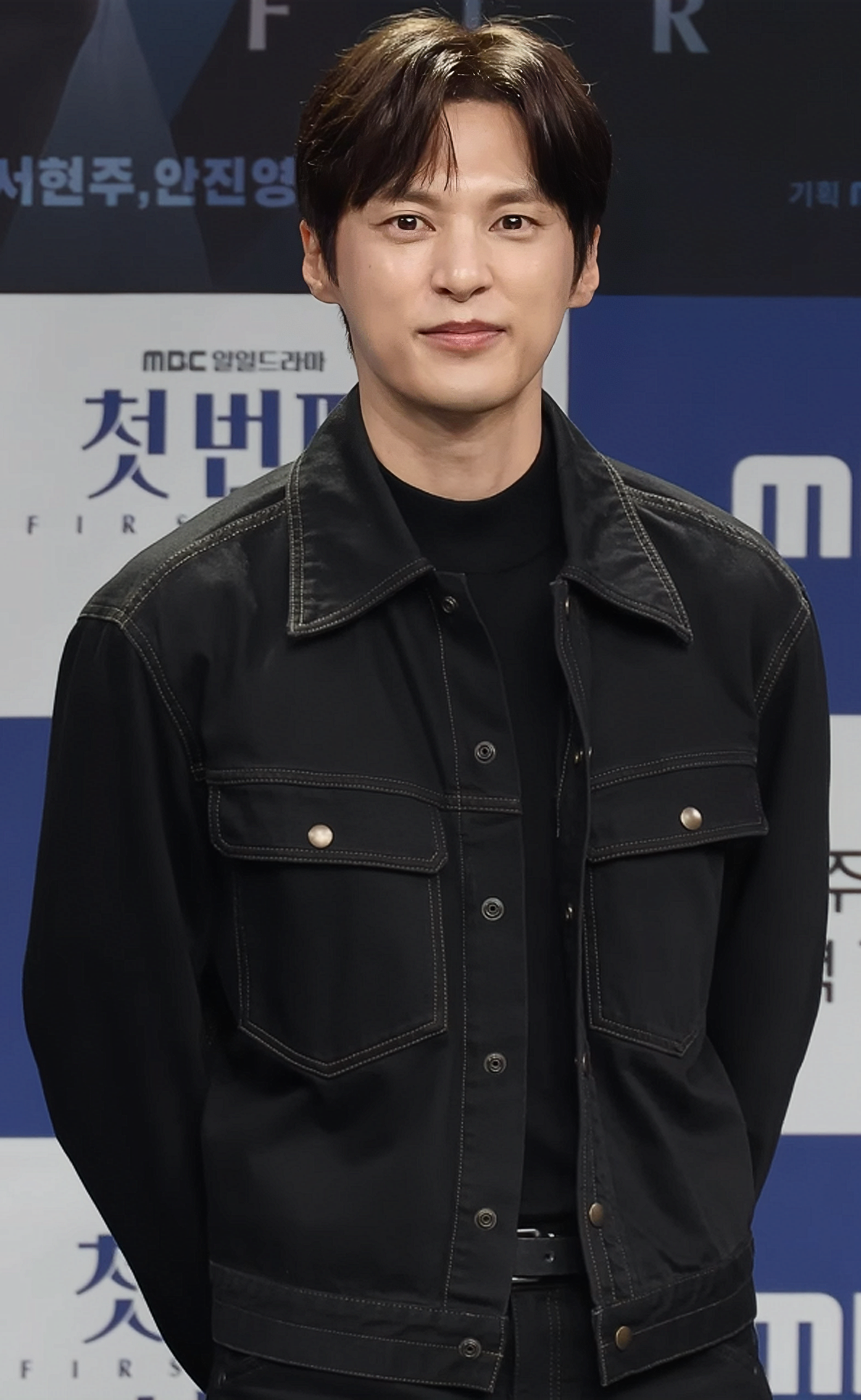
- Yoon in 2025
- Born: Yoon Min-soo; 7 September 1985 (age 41); Seoul, South Korea
- Other name: Yoon Seon-woo
- Education: Kyonggi University
- Occupation: Actor
- Years active: 2003–present
- Agent: 935 Entertainment
- Height: 1.83 m (6 ft 0 in)
- Spouse: Kim Ga-eun (m. 2025)

Korean name
- Hangul: 윤민수
- RR: Yun Minsu
- MR: Yun Minsu

Stage name
- Hangul: 윤선우
- Hanja: 尹善友
- RR: Yun Seonu
- MR: Yun Sŏnu

Yoon Min-soo (Korean: 윤민수; born 7 September 1985), known professionally as Yoon Sun-woo, is a South Korean actor. He is best known for his roles in the television series Moon Lovers: Scarlet Heart Ryeo (2016), Still 17 (2018), Home for Summer (2019) and Hot Stove League (2019–2020).

== Personal life ==
On July 1, 2025, it was reported that Yoon would marry actress Kim Ga-eun after 10 years of dating. The couple married on October 26, 2025, in Seoul. On October 25, 2026, Yoon's wife announced that she is expecting their first child.

== Filmography ==
=== Film ===
Year	Title	Role
2003	The Circle	
2010	Bang!	
2013	Miracle in Cell No. 7	Prosecutor
2016	Upstanding Man	Min-gyoo

=== Television series ===
Year	Title	Role	Notes	Ref.
2003	Environment Sentai Genta Force			
2010	Quiz of God			
2011	Detectives in Trouble			
2013	Shining Romance			
2014	KBS Drama Special: "You're Pretty, Oh Man-bok"	Joon		
2014	Single-minded Dandelion	Shin Tae-oh		
2016	Moon Lovers: Scarlet Heart Ryeo	9th Prince Wang Won		
2017	Reunited Worlds	Sung Young-joon		
2018	Still 17	Kim Hyung-tae		
2019	Liver or Die	Yoo Heung-man		
2019	Home for Summer	Joo Sang-Won		
2019	Hot Stove League	Baek Yeong-soo		
2020	The World of the Married	College student	Cameo (Ep. 16)	
2020	Men Are Men	Seo Hyun-ju's ex-boyfriend	Cameo (Ep. 1, 2)	
2020–21	Awaken	Moon Jae-woong		
2022	Good Job	Kang Tae-joon		
2023–2024	The Third Marriage	Wang Yo-han		
2025–2026	First Man	Kang Baek-ho		

== Awards and nominations ==
Name of the award ceremony, year presented, category, nominee of the award, and the result of the nomination
Award ceremony	Year	Category	Nominee / Work	Result	Ref.
KBS Drama Awards	2019	Excellence Award, Actor in a Daily Drama	Home for Summer	Nominated	
SBS Drama Awards	2020	Best Supporting Team	Hot Stove League (Note: with Ha Do-kwon, Yoon Sun-woo, Kim Soo-jin, Cha-yeop, Lee Jun-hyeok and Jo Han-sun)	Won	
