= Jo Han-sun =

South Korean actor (born 1981)

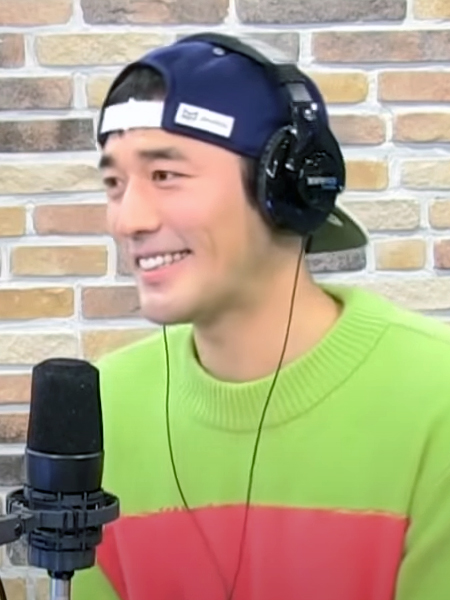
- Jo in February 2020
- Born: June 17, 1981 (age 45); Seoul, South Korea
- Education: Hongik University – Sports Industry
- Occupation: Actor
- Years active: 2001–present
- Agent: Mystic Story
- Spouse: Jung Hye-jung (m. 2010)
- Children: 2

Korean name
- Hangul: 조한선
- Hanja: 趙漢善
- RR: Jo Hanseon
- MR: Cho Hansŏn

Jo Han-sun (Korean: 조한선; born June 17, 1981) is a South Korean actor.

== Early life and career ==
Jo was born into a family with financial difficulties. A Hongik University graduate with a degree in Sports Industry Studies, he played football as a goalkeeper through his youth and university years. He was drafted by Bucheon SK, but ultimately switched to acting due to a back injury. He made his debut in an OB commercial in 2001, then became a household name through the sitcom Nonstop 3 (2002) and the television dramas April Kiss (2004) and Hot Stove League (2019). He is best known for the films Temptation of Wolves (2004), Cruel Winter Blues (2006), A Better Tomorrow, the 2010 remake of the Hong Kong classic, and Blue Busking (2016).

== Personal life ==
His father died in 2005 following a prolonged hospital stay after a traffic accident. In the same year, Jo caused a multi-vehicle collision while driving intoxicated in Gangnam, Seoul, resulting in one injury. He was booked and fined without being physically detained, and his driver's license was revoked. In 2010, Jo married Jung Hye-jung. The couple has two children.

== Filmography ==
=== Film ===
Year	Title	Role
2004	Temptation of Wolves	Ban Hae-won
2006	Now and Forever	Lee Min-su
2006	Cruel Winter Blues	Moon Chi-guk
2008	My New Partner	Kang Young-joon
2008	Sweet Lie	Park Dong-sik
2009	City of Damnation	Man on motorcycle (cameo)
2009	Where Are You Going?	Il-nam
2010	Attack the Gas Station 2	High Kick
2010	A Better Tomorrow	Jung Tae-min
2015	The Outsider: Mean Streets	Un-cheol
2015	Deep Trap	Kwon Jun-sik
2015	Malice	Boss Kim (cameo)
2016	Blue Busking	Ho-bin
2018	Brothers in Heaven	Tae-joo
2021	Tiger Mask	Ge On-pyeong
2023	I'm Here	Jeon-su
2025	My Daughter is a Zombie	Lee Mung-gi

=== Television series ===
Year	Title	Role	Notes
2002	Nonstop 3	Jo Han-sun	
2003	Good Person	Kang Tae-pyung	
2004	April Kiss	Kang Jae-sup	
2010	The Woman Who Still Wants to Marry	Lee Shin-young's ex-fiancé	(cameo)
2013–2014	Thrice Married Woman	Ahn Kwang-mo	
2015	Mask	Kim Jung-tae	
2016	Yeah, That's How It Is	Yoo Se-Hyun	
2019	Possessed	Hong Seo-jung	
2019–2020	Hot Stove League	Lim Dong-gyu	
2020	She Knows Everything	In Ho-chul	
2021	KBS Drama Special	Jeong Seok-yeong	Episode "The Break of Memories"

=== Web series ===
Year	Title	Role	Notes/Ref.
2024–2026	A Shop for Killers	Be-il	

=== Variety shows ===
Year	Title	Notes
2015	Law of the Jungle in Nicaragua	Cast member
2022	2 Days & 1 Night	Guest; S4 ep. 141-143

=== Music video appearances ===
Year	Song title	Artist
2003	"Is It True"	Jang Na-ra
2006	"Twelfth Night"	As One
2007	"Goodbye"	KCM
2008	"Women Always Want Love"	Wax
2009	"Message from the Heart"	Freestyle
2010	"Ghost"	Hwayobi and Go Yoo-jin
2013	"Walking Along"	Cho Yong-pil
2021	"Again"	Monni

== Awards and nominations ==
Year	Award	Category	Nominated work	Result
2004	3rd Korean Film Awards	Best New Actor	Temptation of Wolves	Nominated
2005	42nd Grand Bell Awards	Best New Actor	Temptation of Wolves	Nominated
2007	15th Chunsa Film Art Awards	Best Supporting Actor	Cruel Winter Blues	Won
2007	28th Blue Dragon Film Awards	Best Supporting Actor	Cruel Winter Blues	Nominated
2007	6th Korean Film Awards	Best Supporting Actor	Cruel Winter Blues	Nominated
2020	MBC Drama Awards	Top Excellence Award, Actor in a Monday-Tuesday Miniseries / Short Drama	She Knows Everything	Nominated
2020	SBS Drama Awards	Best Supporting Actor	Hot Stove League	Nominated
2020	SBS Drama Awards	Best Supporting Team (Note: with Ha Do-kwon, Yoon Sun-woo, Kim Soo-jin, Cha-yeop, Lee Jun-hyeok and Jo Han-sun)	Hot Stove League	Won
2021	KBS Drama Awards	Best Actor in Drama Special/TV Cinema	Drama Special – Abyss	Nominated
