= Petty Romance =

2010 film by Kim Jeong-hoon

- Film poster
- Hangul: 쩨쩨한 로맨스
- RR: Jjejjehan romaenseu
- MR: Tchetchehan romaensŭ
- Directed by: Kim Jung-hoon
- Written by: Kim Jung-hoon
- Produced by: Baek Kyung-sook
- Starring: Choi Kang-hee; Lee Sun-kyun
- Cinematography: Choi Young-hwan
- Edited by: Nam Na-yeong
- Music by: Jung Jae-hyung
- Release date: December 2, 2010
- Running time: 118 minutes
- Country: South Korea
- Language: Korean
- Box office: US$14,244,325

Petty Romance (Korean: 쩨쩨한 로맨스; RR: Jjejjehan romaenseu) is a 2010 South Korean 18-rated romantic comedy film about the fiery relationship between an adult cartoonist and a former sex columnist. The film was a moderate hit, selling 2,048,296 tickets nationwide.

Lead actors Lee Sun-kyun and Choi Kang-hee had previously starred together in the 2008 SBS TV series My Sweet Seoul.

== Plot ==
Seoul, the present day. In need of money to redeem a treasured family portrait, struggling manhwa artist Jeong Bae takes part in a publishing company's competition for an adult manga with a prize of ₩130 million (US$100,000). Advised that his big weakness is his story-writing, Jeong Bae advertises for a professional writer and ends up hiring the self-important Han Da-rim, with whom he agrees to split the prize money 50-50 if they win. Unknown to Jeong Bae, Da-rim recently lost her job as a sex columnist at magazine Hot Girl — edited by her friend Ma Kyung-sun — where she compensated for her lack of experience with men by copying material from the Kama Sutra to the Kinsey Reports. For the manhwa competition, Da-rim comes up with the idea of a female assassin, Ma Mi-so, who keeps her male victims captive for erotic kicks; without telling Jeong Bae, she models the victim on her twin brother, womanising Han Jong-soo, who shares a flat with her and cannot wait for her to move out. She finally does, which leads Jeong Bae's friend (and fellow competitor) Hae-ryong, who has secretly bugged his flat, to believe they're having an affair. However, from her unrealistic sex scenes, Jeong Bae gradually comes to suspect that Da-rim has never actually "done it", and then realizes she's developed a crush on him.

== Cast ==
- Choi Kang-hee as Han Da-rim
- Lee Sun-kyun as Jeong Bae
- Ryu Hyun-kyung as Ma Kyung-sun
- Song Yoo-ha as Han Jong-soo
- Oh Jung-se as Hae-ryong
- Baek Do-bin as Min-ho
- Lee Won-jong as Lee Se-young
- Park Sung-il as Byung-doo
- Jung Min-sung as Team Leader Park
- Ryu Ji-hye as sexy woman
- Yoon Jin-soo as glamorous woman
- Yeo Moo-young as Min-ho's father
- Park No-shik as unemployed man
- Hwang Bo-ra as Bol-mae's older sister (cameo)
- Jo Eun-ji as female employee at award ceremony (cameo)
