= Sweet Buns =

- Promotional poster
- Also known as: Red Bean Bread
- Genre: Romance; Comedy; Drama
- Written by: Lee Sook-jin
- Directed by: Lee Jae-dong
- Starring: Choi Kang-hee; Park Gwang-hyun; Jung Chan; Jung So-young
- Country of origin: South Korea
- Original language: Korean
- No. of episodes: 26

Production
- Producer: Jung In
- Running time: 60 minutes

Original release
- Network: Munhwa Broadcasting Corporation
- Release: July 4, 2004 – January 16, 2005

Sweet Buns (Korean: 단팥빵; RR: Danpatppang) is a South Korean television series starring Choi Kang-hee, Park Gwang-hyun, Jung Chan and Jung So-young. It aired on MBC from July 4, 2004 to January 16, 2005 every Sunday at 8:55 a.m. for 26 episodes.

== Plot ==
Ga-ran and Nam-joon were classmates in elementary school. Ga-ran is a tomboy who prefers trousers to skirts, and loves taekwondo more than her piano lessons. Nam-joon on the other hand is Mr. Perfect who's got good looks, a fine brain, and is the most popular guy in school, especially among the girls. One day, Ga-ran sees Nam-joon giving away the sweet bun which Ga-ran's friend gave him, to another girl. Ga-ran throws herself at Nam-joon and beats him up, and their rivalry lasts throughout high school. A few years after college, Ga-ran and Nam-joon meet again as adults, both recovering from recent break-ups. Despite their constant bickering, they gradually realize that they're meant to be.

== Cast ==
- Choi Kang-hee as Han Ga-ran
  - Shim Eun-kyung as young Ga-ran
- Park Gwang-hyun as Ahn Nam-joon
  - Kang Sung-hyun as young Nam-joon
- Jung Chan as Yoo Kwan-ha
- Jung So-young as Hong Hye-jan
- Ryu Hyun-kyung as Kim Sun-hee, Ga-ran's housemate
- Kim Han as Lee Deok-jin
- Kim Na-woon as Ahn Nam-hee, Nam-joon's older sister
- Park Kwang-jung as Choi Jung-hoon, Nam-hee's husband
- Jung Kyung-ho as Lee Ki-dong
- Lee Bom as Soo-hee
- Song Jae-ho as Jeon Young-il, Ga-ran's school principal
- Jung Han-heon as Hwang Jung-gu
- Kim Ji-wan as Lee Shin-hyuk
  - Yoo Seung-ho as young Shin-hyuk
- Kim Sung-joo as interviewer
- Kim Nam-gil as Hye-jan's boyfriend
- MC Mong (cameo)
