= Running Man (2013 film) =

- Hangul: 런닝맨
- RR: Reonningmaen
- MR: Rŏnningmaen
- Directed by: Jo Dong-oh
- Written by: Jo Dong-oh
- Produced by: Jeong Jong-hun
- Starring: Shin Ha-kyun
- Cinematography: Jo Sang-yuen
- Edited by: Nam Na-yeong
- Music by: Kim Jun-seok
- Production companies: Fox International Productions; Cree Pictures; Korean Film Council
- Distributed by: 20th Century Fox
- Release date: April 4, 2013
- Running time: 127 minutes
- Country: South Korea
- Language: Korean
- Box office: US$9.2 million

Running Man (Korean: 런닝맨) is a 2013 South Korean action film starring Shin Ha-kyun as an ordinary man who begins to be chased and watched by the entire nation after he is falsely accused in a homicide case.

Running Man was the first ever Korean movie to have 100% of its investment come from a Hollywood studio, 20th Century Fox, which also produced it along with CreaPictures. Distributed by Fox both domestically and worldwide, it was released in theaters on April 4, 2013.

== Plot ==
Jong-Woo (Shin Ha-kyun) went to prison four times for petty crimes like burglary and car theft, but he now works as an auto mechanic. He has a 17-year-old son named Gi-Hyuk (Lee Min-ho), which he raises by himself. Gi-Hyuk is a smart kid, but troubled. The father and the son also do not get along. Although Jong-Woo might appear like an irresponsible father, he tries his best and even works at night as a private taxi service.

One evening, Jong-Woo drops off a couple at a ritzy hotel. Suddenly, another man hops into Jong-Woo's car and tells him to drive off. Once the man pulls out a large stash of cash, Jong-Woo is happy to drive the man wherever he wants. The man asks Jong-Woo to drive him to a delivery company.

Jong-Woo walks into the delivery company and asks for directions to the bathroom. He then notices the man mailing off a small electronic device. The man then comes up to Jong-Woo and offers him $1,000 if he will drive him to an apartment and then to the airport. Jong-Woo happily agrees, but he first grabs the man's cellphone and calls his own cellphone.

Once they get into the parking garage of the apartment complex, Jong-Woo's life turned completely upside down. He runs out of the garage on foot and becomes the prime suspect in a murder case.

Meanwhile, Gi-Hyuk is shocked and confused that his father is now a murder suspect. Gi-Hyuk attempts to uncover the truth.

== Cast ==
- Shin Ha-kyun - Cha Jong-woo, auto mechanic
- Lee Tae-ri - Cha Gi-hyuk, Jong-woo's son (credit as Lee Min-ho)
- Kim Sang-ho - Ahn Sang-ki, detective
- Jo Eun-ji - Park Sun-young, reporter
- Oh Jung-se - Jang Do-sik, computer geek
- Joo Hyun - Pastor Moon
- Kim Eui-sung - Director Kim
- Jung Suk-yong - Chief of police
- Nam Kyung-eup - Richard Ma
- Won Woong-jae - Detective Choi
- Jung Mi-seong - Reporter Choi
- Kwon Beom-taek - Dr. Hong Seung-hoon
- Park Sang-wook - Beard
- Yeom Dong-heon - Drunk

== Release ==
Running Man was released in South Korea on April 4, 2013. It opened at number one at the South Korean box office, grossing a total of US$3,317,529 in its first week. The film fell to third place in its second week, behind the premieres of Fists of Legend and Oblivion. The film has grossed a total of US$8,873,200.

== Critical reception ==
Film Business Asia gave the film a three out of ten rating, referring to it as an "over-played and under-written action marathon quickly wears out its welcome."
