= A Superior Day =

2022 South Korean television series

- Promotional Poster
- Hangul: 우월한 하루
- RR: Uwolhan haru
- MR: Uwŏrhan haru
- Genre: Drama; Thriller
- Created by: Studio Dragon
- Based on: Superior Day by Team Getname
- Written by: Lee Ji-hyun
- Directed by: Jo Nam-hyeong
- Starring: Jin Goo; Ha Do-kwon; Lee Won-keun
- Country of origin: South Korea
- Original language: Korean
- No. of episodes: 8

Production
- Producer: Yu Bum-sang
- Running time: 60 minutes
- Production company: IWill Media

Original release
- Network: OCN
- Release: March 13 – May 1, 2022

A Superior Day (Korean: 우월한 하루; RR: Uwolhan haru) is a 2022 South Korean television series directed by Jo Nam-hyeong and starring Jin Goo, Ha Do-kwon, and Lee Won-keun. Based on webtoon by Team Getname, this series depicts 24-hour runaway thriller in which only the most superior survives, in which the most ordinary man must kill the serial killer who lives next door to save his kidnapped daughter. It premiered on OCN on March 13, 2022, and aired every Sunday at 22:30 (KST).

== Cast ==
=== Main ===
- Jin Goo as Lee Ho-cheol
- Ha Do-kwon as Bae Tae-jin
- Lee Won-keun as Kwon Si-woo

=== Supporting ===
- Kim Do-hyun as Seo Dong-ju, a private security guard in Parisville who helps Ho-cheol in search of a murderer.
- Lee Seo-joon as Detective Oh.
- Lim Hwa-young as Choi Jeong-hye, Ho-cheol's wife and a police officer.
- Gyeol-hwi as Jeong-min.
- Jo Yu-ha as Lee Su-a, the kidnapped daughter of Lee Ho-chul.
- Park Min-jung as Detective Chu, fiercely pursues a series of murder cases and faces a new challenge.
- Na Cheol as Min-gi, What kind of relationship does he have with Bae Tae-jin?

== Production ==
=== Filming ===
Filming began at Heungdeok District, Cheongju in November 2021 after finalizing complete cast.

On March 11, 2022, it was confirmed that actor Ha Do-kwon contracted COVID-19 on the afternoon of the 10th and all filming schedules have been cancelled.

== Ratings ==
Average TV viewership ratings (nationwide)
Ep.	Original broadcast date	Average audience share (Nielsen Korea)
1	March 13, 2022	1.045% (39th)
2	March 20, 2022	1.178% (33rd)
3	March 27, 2022	0.912% (44th)
4	April 3, 2022	0.848% (44th)
5	April 10, 2022	0.952% (39th)
6	April 17, 2022	0.936% (42nd)
7	April 24, 2022	0.8% (50th)
8	May 1, 2022	0.884% (42nd)
Average		0.944%
In the table above, the blue numbers represent the lowest ratings and the red numbers represent the highest ratings.
