= Jo Byeong-kyu =

South Korean actor (born 1996)

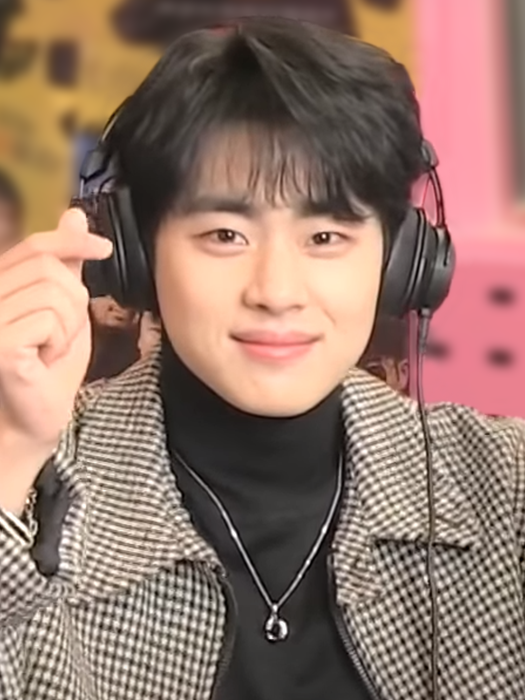
- Jo in February 2021
- Born: April 23, 1996 (age 30); Seoul, South Korea
- Education: Anyang Arts High School
- Occupation: Actor
- Years active: 2015–present
- Agent: HB Entertainment
- Height: 171 cm (5 ft 7 in)

Korean name
- Hangul: 조병규
- RR: Jo Byeonggyu
- MR: Cho Pyŏnggyu
- Website: hbenter.com

Jo Byeong-kyu (Korean: 조병규; born April 23, 1996) is a South Korean actor. He is notable for his roles in the television series Sky Castle (2018–2019), Hot Stove League (2019–2020), and The Uncanny Counter Season 1 & 2 (2020–2023).

== Personal life ==
=== Bullying allegations and investigation ===
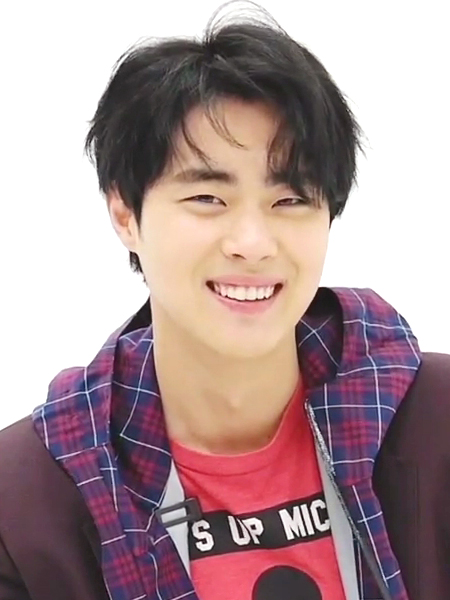
Jo for Marie Claire Korea in April 2020

In February 2021, Jo Byeong-kyu was accused of being a former bully back in his school days, which led to a suspension of his career and investigations being made on the veracity of these allegations. In July 2021, police investigations had concluded that the allegations were fabricated and the accuser had apologised to Jo, who was set to recover his career and in talks to star in a new drama series.

=== Military service ===
Jo was judged to be a 4th-grade supplementary service (social service agent) in his first physical examination by the Military Manpower Administration. Jo had been diagnosed with scoliosis, but decided to apply for a re-examination. The exact timing of Cho's enlistment has not been determined, but he is expected to enlist in the second half of 2024.

== Filmography ==
=== Film ===
Year	Title	Role	Notes	Ref.
2016	Life Risking Romance	Seol Rok-hwan (teen)		
2016	Secret	Park Ji-soo	independent film	
2016	School Battle	Park Ji-soo	independent film	
2016	Interchange	Lee Jun-seok	independent film	
2016	Shooting Star	Moo-joo	independent film	
2016	Train to Chuncheon	Kim Tae-soo	independent film	
2016	Agape	Song Tae-woo	independent film	
2016	Cinema Game "Some"	Sang Sik	independent film	
2017	Let's Go	himself	independent film	
2017	Knock, Knock, Knock	Yeon-woo	independent film	
2017	I Had No Other Choice	Song Kwang	independent film	
2018	Fantasy of the Girls	Go Woo-cheol		
2018	Kim Hee-sun	Choi Dong-hun	independent film	
2019	Idol	Goo Yo-han		
2019	Miss & Mrs. Cops	Kang Han-sol		
2020	Special Ending	Jeon Su-won	independent film	
2021	There Is an Alien Here	Do Geon-tae		
2021	Hardcore Romance	Kim Haeng-nam	independent film	
2021	Is Hikikomori Doing Well?	Ki-woo	independent film	
2021	Killing Kim Gong-joo	Byeong-kyu	independent film	
2022	School Caste	Shin Je-ah	TVING Short Film	
2022	Millennial Killer	Jeong-sik	independent film	
2024	Again 1997	Jeon Woo-seok		
2025	Boy	Rohan		

=== Television series ===
Year	Title	Role	Notes	Ref.
2015	Who Are You: School 2015	Byeong-kyu		
2015	Riders: Catch Tomorrow	Kim Min-joong		
2016	Yeah, That's How It Is	the patient	Episode 28	
2016	A Beautiful Mind	Gye Jin-sung's brother		
2016	The K2	the part-timer	Episode 8	
2017	Queen for Seven Days	Baek Suk-hee (young)		
2017	Money Flower	Kang Pil-joo (young)		
2017	Hello, My Twenties! 2	Jo Chung-han		
2017	Girls' Generation 1979	Lee Bong-soo		
2018	Radio Romance	Go Hoon-jung		
2018	The Time	Kim Bok-kyu		
2018–2019	Sky Castle	Cha Ki-joon		
2019	He Is Psychometric	Kang Seong-mo (young)		
2019	Arthdal Chronicles	Sateunik		
2019–2020	Hot Stove League	Han Jae-hee		
2020–2023	The Uncanny Counter	So Mun	Season 1–2	
2025	History of Scruffiness	Seo Min-ki		
TBA	Paradise	Kang Jin Hyuk		
TBA	Kopino		Philippine TV series	

=== Web series ===
Year	Title	Role	Ref.
2018	Dokgo Rewind	Kim Jong-il	

=== Television shows ===
Year	Title	Role	Notes	Ref.
2019–2020	Naturally	Cast member	Episode 1–6, 8–12, 20, 26, 36–43	
2021	Long Live Independence	Cast member	Episode 2	
2024	Rap Cup	Main MC		

== Discography ==
=== Singles ===
Title	Year	Album
"Pieces Of My Life" (with Choi Hui-seung, UK)	2024	Again 1997 OST
"Don't Cry"	2024	Non-album single

== Awards and nominations ==
Name of the award ceremony, year presented, category, nominee of the award, and the result of the nomination
Award ceremony	Year	Category	Nominee / Work	Result	Ref.
Asia Model Awards	2021	Rising Star Award	The Uncanny Counter	Won	
SBS Drama Awards	2020	Best New Actor	Hot Stove League	Won	
