= Choi Kang-hee (actress) =

South Korean actress and radio DJ (born 1977)

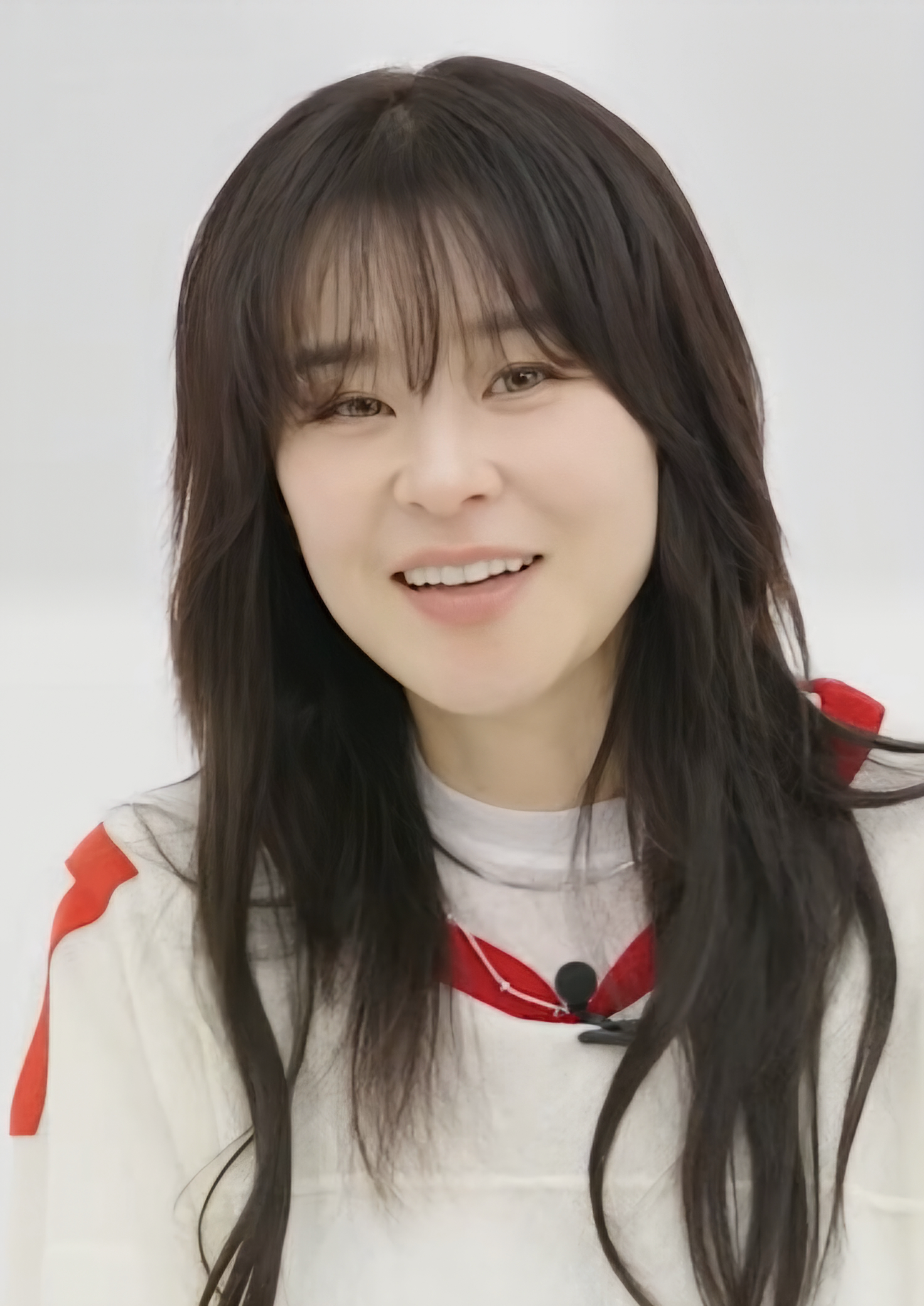
- Choi in May 2024
- Born: May 5, 1977 (age 49); Eunpyeong District, Seoul, South Korea
- Occupations: Actress; radio DJ
- Years active: 1995–present
- Agent: Media Lab Seesaw

Korean name
- Hangul: 최강희
- Hanja: 崔江姬
- RR: Choe Ganghui
- MR: Ch'oe Kanghŭi

Choi Kang-hee (born May 5, 1977) is a South Korean actress and radio DJ. She launched her career by starring in two classic film and television series franchises, Whispering Corridors and School.

== Career ==
Choi Kang-hee made her acting debut in 1995 with a high school drama The New Generation Report: Adults Don't Know. She then went on to appear in the first installment of famed film and series franchises, horror film Whispering Corridors (1998) and television series School (1999), followed by Sweet Buns (2004) and Our Stance on How to Treat a Break-up (also known as Rules of Love, 2005).

In 2006, Choi starred in the low-budget black/romantic comedy film My Scary Girl, which became a critically-praised sleeper hit.

In 2007, Choi participated in Humming Urban Stereo's album Baby Love, recording narrated parts.

Choi released two popular films in consecutive years, a 2009 dramedy Goodbye Mom and the 2010 romantic comedy Petty Romance, which earned her three Popularity Awards from major film awards: 46th Baeksang Arts Awards and 30th-32nd Blue Dragon Film Awards.

In 2011 Choi starred in the romantic comedy series Protect the Boss. The drama became one of major winners at the SBS Drama Awards. Her next TV dramas were 2013's action romantic comedy 7th Grade Civil Servant and 2015's medical romantic comedy Heart to Heart.

Choi acted in a melodrama for the first time in some years with the 2015 series Glamorous Temptation. She then acted in a two season series with the 2017–2018 procedural comedy Queen of Mystery and its sequel. She signed with Management Gil.

In 2020 Choi led the espionage comedy drama Good Casting, In 2021, Choi appeared in the fantasy romantic comedy Hello, Me! opposite Kim Young-kwang.

In 2024, Choi signed an exclusive contract with Media Lab Seesaw.

== Other activities ==
In addition to acting, Choi is a radio DJ on KBS Cool FM. She also has her own clothing brand, Nowhere333.

In October 2006, Choi was awarded a silver medal by the Korea National Red Cross in recognition of her frequent blood donations. A year later, she became the first Korean celebrity to donate bone marrow, having pledged as a donor in 1999.

== Filmography ==
=== Film ===
Year	Title	Role	Notes	Ref.
1998	Whispering Corridors	Yoon Jae-yi	credited as Choi Se-yeon	
2000	The Happy Funeral Director	So-hwa		
2001	Wanee & Junah	So-young		
2002	Yellow Flower	Woman (story 4)	credited as Choi Se-yeon	
2004	Sweet Buns	Han Ga Ran		
2006	My Scary Girl	Lee Mi-na		
2007	Attack on the Pin-Up Boys	Movie scene	Cameo	
2007	My Love	Joo-won		
2009	Goodbye Mom	Park Ae-ja		
2010	Bestseller	Whispers	Cameo	
2010	Petty Romance	Han Da-rim		
2013	Happiness for Sale	Kang Mi-na		
2015	He Who Loves the World		Documentary narrator	
2019	Tune in for Love		voice	

=== Television series ===
Year	Title	Role	Notes	Ref.
1995	The New Generation Report: "Adults Don't Know"			
1996	Drama Game: "Sons and Lovers"			
1996	Icing			
1997	I			
1998	MBC Best Theater: "Village Bus"			
1998	Sunday Best: "That Light Green Color That Won't Be Erased"	Nan-joo		
1998	To The Woman: My Wife Susie			
1998	Hometown of Legends: "A Ghost Faced Breeze"			
1998	Theme Game			
1998	The King and the Queen	Royal consort Sugeun-bi		
1998	Paper Crane	Eun-seo		
1998	Sunflower	Lee Eun-joo		
1999	School 1	Lee Min-jae		
1999	Ad Madness	Yoon Sung-yeon		
1999	Sunday Best: "Beautiful Gift"			
2000	Feels Good	Mi-soo		
2000	March			
2000	2000 Romeo and Juliet			
2001	School 3		Cameo (Episode 38) / Episode :Like the First Time	
2001	Medical Center	Attempted suicide patient	Cameo (Episode 20)	
2001	Open Drama Man and Woman: "Fatherhood"			
2001	MBC Best Theater: "The Scent of Limes"			
2001	Legend	Jeon Mi-sun		
2001	This Is Love	Oh Young-ah		
2002	Open Drama Man and Woman: "To Reverse the Clock"			
2002	The Maengs' Golden Era	Maeng Eun-ja		
2003	Land of Wine	Song Ae-ryung		
2003	New Gyun-woo and Jik-nyu	Ri Yeon-jung		
2004	Sweet Buns	Han Ka-ran		
2005	Drama City: "Home Improvement Work Log"	Kang Do-kyung		
2005	Beating Heart	Oh Soo-kyung	Cameo (Episode 7–8) / Episode: Hope	
2005	Our Stance on How to Treat a Break-up	Kim Geun-young		
2007	Thank You	Cha Ji-min	Cameo	
2008	My Sweet Seoul	Oh Eun-soo		
2011	Protect the Boss	Noh Eun-seol		
2013	7th Grade Civil Servant	Kim Seo-won/Kim Kyung-ja		
2015	Heart to Heart	Cha Hong-do		
2015–2016	Glamorous Temptation	Shin Eun-soo		
2017	Queen of Mystery	Yoo Seol-ok		
2018	Queen of Mystery 2	Yoo Seol-ok		
2018	KBS Drama Special: "A Very Midday Romance"	Yang-hee		
2020	Good Casting	Baek Chan-mi / Baek Jang-mi		
2021	Hello, Me!	Ban Ha-ni		

=== Television show ===
Year	Title	Role	Notes	Ref.
2008	Kang-hee's Six Addictions			
2009	Living Beauty: Kang-hee's Colored Fantasy			

=== Music video appearances ===
Song title	Artist
"If You Can"	Adam
"Because I Love You"	Son Sung-hoon
"Go"	K
"For The First Time"	K
"Flirt"	3Boys
"Olla Olla"	Uptown

=== Radio shows ===
Year	Title	Role	Note	Ref.
2004–2006	Volume Up	DJ	October 18, 2004 – October 8, 2006	
2011	Volume Up	DJ	January 1, 2011 – October 30, 2011	
2011–2012	Night Flight	DJ	November 7, 2011 – November 4, 2012	
2017	Volume Up	DJ	June 19, 2017 – July 2, 2017	

== Bibliography ==
Year	Title	Publisher	ISBN
2009	Choi Kang-hee, A Little Child's; Little Happiness (photo-essays)	Book Nomad	ISBN 978-895-460-885-5

== Awards and nominations ==
Name of the award ceremony, year presented, category, nominee of the award, and the result of the nomination
Award ceremony	Year	Category	Nominee / Work	Result	Ref.
APAN Star Awards	2016	Top Excellence Award, Actress in a Serial Drama	Glamorous Temptation	Nominated	
Baeksang Arts Awards	2010	Best Actress – Film	Goodbye Mom	Nominated	
Baeksang Arts Awards	2010	Most Popular Actress	Goodbye Mom	Won	
Blue Dragon Film Awards	2001	Best Supporting Actress	Wanee & Junah	Nominated	
Blue Dragon Film Awards	2006	Best Actress	My Scary Girl	Nominated	
Blue Dragon Film Awards	2009	Best Actress	Goodbye Mom	Nominated	
Blue Dragon Film Awards	2009	Popular Star Award	Goodbye Mom	Won	
Blue Dragon Film Awards	2011	Best Actress	Petty Romance	Nominated	
Blue Dragon Film Awards	2011	Popular Star Award	Petty Romance	Won	
Brand Academy	2008	Best Female Advertising Model	Choi Kang-hee	Won	
Buil Film Awards	2009	Best Actress	Goodbye Mom	Nominated	
Buil Film Awards	2011	Best Actress	Petty Romance	Nominated	
Dior Timeless Beauty Awards	2006	Recipient	Choi Kang-hee	Won	
Grand Bell Awards	2009	Best Actress	Goodbye Mom	Nominated	
Grand Bell Awards	2011	Best Actress	Petty Romance	Nominated	
Johnson & Johnson	1995	Best Clean Face	Choi Kang-hee	Won	
KBS Drama Awards	1999	Best New Actress	School, Ad Madness	Won	
KBS Drama Awards	2017	Top Excellence Award, Actress	Queen of Mystery	Nominated	
KBS Drama Awards	2017	Excellence Award, Actress in a Miniseries	Queen of Mystery	Nominated	
KBS Drama Awards	2018	Top Excellence Award, Actress	Queen of Mystery 2	Nominated	
KBS Drama Awards	2018	Excellence Award, Actress in a Miniseries	Queen of Mystery 2	Nominated	
KBS Drama Awards	2018	Best Actress in a One-Act/Special/Short Drama	Too Bright for Romance	Nominated	
KBS Drama Awards	2021	Excellence Award, Actress in a Miniseries	Hello, Me!	Nominated	
Korean Entertainment Awards	2006	Best Radio Host	Pump Up the Volume	Won	
Max Movie Awards	2011	Best Actress	Petty Romance	Won	
MBC Drama Awards	1996	Special Award, Best Young Actress		Won	
MBC Drama Awards	2004	Excellence Award, Actress	Sweet Buns	Nominated	
MBC Drama Awards	2013	Top Excellence Award, Actress in a Miniseries	7th Grade Civil Servant	Nominated	
MBC Drama Awards	2015	Top Excellence Award, Actress in a Special Project Drama	Glamorous Temptation	Nominated	
MBC Entertainment Awards	2024	Rookie Award (Variety) – Female	Omniscient Interfering View	Won	
Miss Ramona	1995	Most Refreshing	Choi Kang-hee	Won	
SBS Drama Awards	2008	Excellence Award, Actress in a Drama Special	My Sweet Seoul	Won	
SBS Drama Awards	2011	Top Excellence Award, Actress in a Drama Special	Protect the Boss	Won	
SBS Drama Awards	2011	Netizen Popularity Award	Protect the Boss	Won	
SBS Drama Awards	2011	Top 10 Stars	Protect the Boss	Won	
SBS Drama Awards	2011	Best Couple Award	Choi Kang-hee with Ji Sung; Protect the Boss	Won	
SBS Drama Awards	2020	Top Excellence Award, Actress in a Miniseries Action Drama	Good Casting	Nominated	
SBS Drama Awards	2020	Best Character Award, Actress	Good Casting	Won	
Seoul Social Work Conference	2008	Social Welfare Award	Choi Kang-hee	Won	
Sharing People of the Month	2011	Minister's Award	Choi Kang-hee	Won	
