= Lee Sang-yeob =

South Korean actor (born 1983)

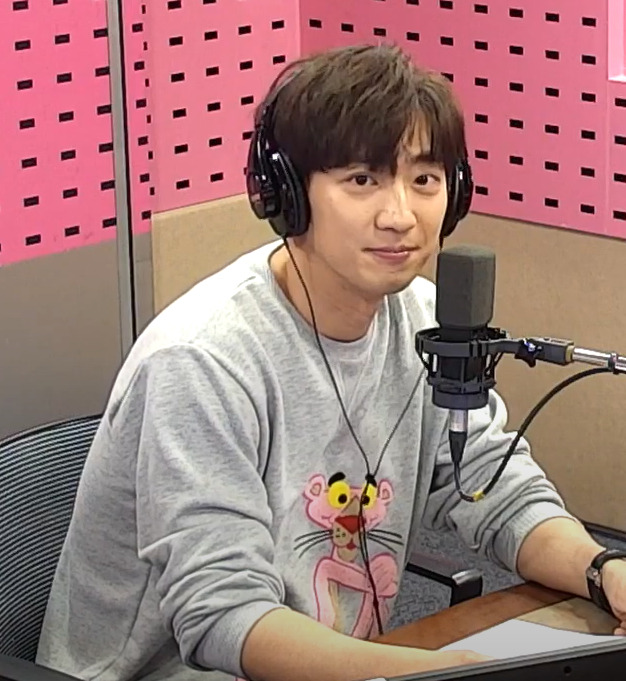
- Lee in April 2020
- Born: May 8, 1983 (age 43); Seoul, South Korea
- Education: Hanyang University (Theater and Film)
- Occupation: Actor
- Years active: 2007–present
- Agent: Ungbin ENS
- Spouse: Unknown (m. 2024)

Korean name
- Hangul: 이상엽
- Hanja: 李相燁
- RR: I Sangyeop
- MR: I Sangyŏp

Lee Sang-yeob (Korean: 이상엽; born May 8, 1983) is a South Korean actor. He is best known for starring in the sitcom Living Among the Rich (2011–2012), the melodrama The Innocent Man (2012), the period drama Jang Ok-jung, Living by Love (2013), and the fantasy drama While You Were Sleeping (2017). He recently gained immense recognition for portraying the role of Yoon Gyu-jin in the weekend drama Once Again (2020).

== Career ==
In 2013, Lee was cast in his first leading role in the weekend drama A Little Love Never Hurts (2013).

== Personal life ==
Lee is the only grandson of the late businessman Kim Jong-jin, who served in executive positions at POSCO and Dongkuk Steel.

=== Marriage ===
On September 25, 2023, Lee's agency confirmed that Lee will marry his girlfriend in March 2024. The couple married on March 24, 2024, at a hotel in Seoul.

== Filmography ==
=== Film ===
Year	Title	Role	Notes	Ref.
2008	A Man Who Was Superman	Soo-jung's boyfriend		
2008	Lovers of Six Years	Yoon-seok		
2011	Penny Pinchers	Yang Gwan-woo		
2012	The Nutcracker in 3D	N.C., the Nutcracker	voice, Korean dubbed	
2013	The Flu	Byung-woo		
2014	Ex-Files	Park Eun-ho		
2018	The Villagers	Ji-sung		
2020	The Day I Died	Hyung-joon		

=== Television series ===
Year	Title	Role	Notes	Ref.
2007	A Happy Woman			
2008	The Great King, Sejong	Crown Prince Hyang		
2008	Kokkiri (Elephant)	Joo Sang-yeob		
2008	The Art of Seduction	Sung-il		
2008	Here He Comes			
2009	Her Style	Yoon Seok-woo		
2011	Midas	Han Jang-seok		
2011	Miss Ripley	Ha Cheol-jin		
2011	Can't Lose	Yeon Hyung-joo	Cameo (Episode 9)	
2011	Living Among the Rich	Lee Sang-yeob		
2012	Koisuru Maison ~Rainbow Rose~	Han Sae-woo	Japan series	
2012	The Innocent Man	Park Joon-ha		
2013	Jang Ok-jung, Living by Love	Prince Dongpyeong		
2013	The Greatest Thing in the World	John Harrison		
2013	A Little Love Never Hurts	Jung Jae-min		
2015	House of Bluebird	Jang Hyun-do		
2016	Signal	Kim Jin-woo	Cameo (Episodes 9–11)	
2016	The Master of Revenge	Park Tae-ha		
2016	The Doctors	Kim Woo-jin	Cameo (Episodes 15–16, 18, 20)	
2016	KBS Drama Special – Home Sweet Home	Kang Sung-min	one act-drama	
2016	Listen to Love	Ahn Joon-young		
2017	While You Were Sleeping	Lee Yoo-bum		
2017	KBS Drama Special – You're Closer Than I Think	Choi Woo-jin	one act-drama	
2018	The Hymn of Death	Kim Hong-ki		
2018	Top Star U-back	Choi Ma-dol		
2019	Love Affairs in the Afternoon	Yoon Jung-woo		
2020	Once Again	Yoon Gyu-jin		
2020	Good Casting	Yoon Seok-ho		
2020	KBS Drama Special – Traces of Love	Jung Ji-sub	one act-drama	
2021	On the Verge of Insanity	Han Se-kwon		
2022	Shooting Stars	Do Ji-hyuk	Cameo (Episode 11)	
2022	Eve	Seo Eun-pyeong		
2023	My Lovely Boxer	Kim Tae-young		

=== Web series ===
Year	Title	Role	Notes	Ref.
2021	Nara's Marvelous Days	Ex-boyfriend	Cameo	
2025	A Stormy Marriage	Kim Hyun-woo		

=== Television show ===
Year	Title	Role	Notes	Ref.
2015	Law of the Jungle in Samoa	Cast member	Episodes 192–194	
2018	Reckless but Happy	Host		
2019	My Little Old Boy	Special Host	Episode 158	
2019	Prison Life of Fools	Cast member		
2019	Trans-Siberian Pathfinders	Cast member		
2020	Three Idiots	Cast member	with Yang Se-chan, Hwang kwang-hee	
2021	National Bang Bang Cook Cook	Cast member		
2021	New Life for Children	Co-host	with Kim Hee-ae	
2021–2022	Sixth Sense	Cast Member	Season 2–3	
2022	Artistock Game	Host		

=== Web shows ===
Year	Title	Role	Notes	Ref.
2022	Saturday Night Live Korea	Host	Episode 16 – Season 2	

=== Hosting ===
Year	Title	Role	Notes	Ref.
2020	2020 KBS Drama Awards	Host	with Do Kyung-wan and Jo Bo-ah (part 2)	

== Discography ==
=== Soundtrack appearances ===
Title	Year	Album
"Red Bag" (빨간 책가방)	2020	Good Casting OST Part 4

== Ambassadorship ==
- Ambassador of Public Relations for the Anti-Conflict of Interest Act (2022)

== Awards and nominations ==
Name of the award ceremony, year presented, category, nominee of the award, and the result of the nomination
Award ceremony	Year	Category	Nominee / Work	Result	Ref.
APAN Star Awards	2013	Best New Actor	Jang Ok-jung, Living by Love	Nominated	
APAN Star Awards	2021	Top Excellence Award, Actor in a Serial Drama	Once Again	Won	
KBS Drama Awards	2012	Best Supporting Actor	The Innocent Man	Nominated	
KBS Drama Awards	2015	Best Couple Award	Lee Sang-yeob with Chae Soo-bin; House of Bluebird	Nominated	
KBS Drama Awards	2020	Excellence Award, Actor in a Mid-length Drama	Once Again	Won	
KBS Drama Awards	2020	Netizen Award, Actor	Once Again	Won	
KBS Drama Awards	2020	Best Couple Award	Lee Sang-yeob with Lee Min-jung; Once Again	Won	
KBS Drama Awards	2020	Best Actor in a One-Act/Special/Short Drama	Drama Special – Traces of Love	Nominated	
Korea Best Star Awards	2019	Best Drama Star	Love Affairs in the Afternoon	Won	
Korea Cultural Entertainment Awards	2019	Best Actor (TV)	Love Affairs in the Afternoon	Won	
MBC Drama Awards	2013	Best New Actor	A Little Love Never Hurts	Won	
MBC Drama Awards	2021	Excellence Award, Actor in a Miniseries	On the Verge of Insanity	Won	
SBS Drama Awards	2017	Excellence Award, Actor in Wednesday - Thursday Drama	While You Were Sleeping	Won	
SBS Drama Awards	2017	Character of the Year	While You Were Sleeping	Nominated	
SBS Drama Awards	2020	Top Excellence Award, Actor in a Miniseries Action Drama	Good Casting	Nominated	
