= Ryu Hyun-kyung =

South Korean actress (born 1983)

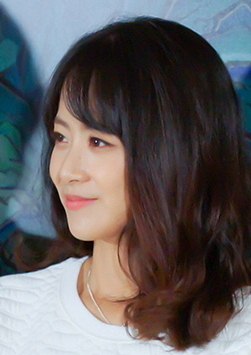
- Ryu in 2014
- Born: March 10, 1983 (age 43); Masan, South Gyeongsang, South Korea
- Education: Hanyang University (Theater and Film)
- Occupations: Actress; film director; music video director
- Years active: 1996–present
- Agent: Alien Company

Korean name
- Hangul: 류현경
- Hanja: 柳賢慶
- RR: Ryu Hyeongyeong
- MR: Ryu Hyŏn'gyŏng

Ryu Hyun-kyung (Korean: 류현경; born March 10, 1983) is a South Korean actress. She made her acting debut in 1996 at age 12 as the younger counterpart of the protagonist in the SBS TV series Oxtail Soup. In 2010, Ryu drew attention with her supporting roles in the erotic period drama The Servant and the romantic comedies Cyrano Agency and Petty Romance. Leading roles followed in Mama (2011), Two Weddings and a Funeral (2012), and Miss Cherry's Love Puzzle (2013).

Ryu also directed the short films Kwang-tae's Basic Story (2009) and Heart Robber (2010), as well as two music videos for the singer Jung-in.

== Filmography ==
=== Film ===
==== As actress ====
Year	Title	Role	Notes/Ref.
2025	No Parking	Oh Yeonhui	
2022	Fairy	Young-ran	premier 26th BIFF
2022	Life Is Beautiful		
2021	Perhaps Love	Hye-jin	special appearance
2019	Pray	Lee Jeong-In	premier BIFF, target release 2019H1
2018	A Tiger in Winter	Hyeon-ji	
2017	The Romantic		
2017	The Artist: Reborn	Giselle	
2015	You Call It Passion	Chae-Eun	
2015	Three Summer Nights	Ji-Young	
2015	Office	Hong Ji-Sun	
2015	Intimate Enemies	Jung-Sook	
2014	Whistle Blower	Kim Mi-Hyun	
2014	The Road Called Life	wife (voice)	animated movie
2014	Manshin: Ten Thousand Spirits	Kim Geum-Hwa (young)	
2013	Miss Cherry's Love Puzzle	Aeng-Doo	
2013	Born to Sing	Mi-Ae	
2013	How to Use Guys with Secret Tips	(cameo)	
2012	Two Weddings and a Funeral	Hyo-Jin	
2011	Departure		short film
2011	Smile Bus	Yun-A	short film
2011	Boy	Jin-Sook	
2011	Mama	Eun-Sung	
2010	Heart Robber	Soo-Yeon	short film
2010	Petty Romance	Kyung-Sun	
2010	Cyrano Agency	Seon-Ah	
2010	The Servant	Hyang Dan-yi	
2010	The First Love Series (segment: "Come On Just Once, Maybe Next Time)	Yoo Bong-joo	
2009	Thirsty, Thirsty	Kwak Seon-Ju	
2008	The Divine Weapon	Bang-Ok	
2006	Slow Food, Fast Food		short film
2003	North Korean Guys	Han Na-Ra	
2003	My Wife Is a Gangster 2	Yoon Ji-Hyun	
2003	Righteous Battle		
2003	Through the Night		
2002	Marriage Is a Crazy Thing	female student part-time worker	
2002	Pencase Freefall Test		short film
2000	Bichunmoo		
2000	Truth Game		
1999	Mayonnaise		
1998	City of the Rising Sun		
1997	Deep Blue		

==== As director ====
Year	Title	Notes
2013	Asiana International Short Film Festival	Trailer
2013	Those Obvious Words (Jung-in)	Music video
2011	Rainy Season (Jung-in)	Music video
2010	Heart Robber	Short film (also credited as screenwriter)
2009	Kwang-tae's Basic Story	Short film

=== Television series ===
Year	Title	Role	Notes/Ref.
2022	Behind Every Star	Ye Min-soo	
2022	Cheer Up	Shin Ji-young	
2022	Trolley	Jin Seung-hee	
2022	O'PENing: "Find the 1st Prize"	Kang Mi-ran	
2021	Taxi Driver	Baek Kyung-mi	Cameo
2019	Doctor Detective	Choi Min	
2018	Feel Good to Die	Choi Min-joo	
2017	Children of the 20th Century	Han A-Reum	
2016	The Master of Revenge	Kim Seon-joo	(cameo)
2015	Oh My Ghost	Policewoman Kang	(cameo, ep 13–14)
2015	The Lover	Ryoo Doo-Ri	
2015	Run Towards Tomorrow	Han Yoo-Jung	
2013	Empress Ki	Princess Kyunghwa	cameo
2013	KBS Drama Special: "Outlasting Happiness"	Sun-Joo	
2012	Tasty Life	Jang Jung-Hyun	
2012	Salamander Guru and The Shadows	Detective Kyung-Ja	
2011	Midnight Hospital	Hong Na-Kyung	
2008	Terroir	Gook Yook-Gong	
2008	Their Romance Encyclopedia		
2006	Just Run!	Song Ji-Hyun	
2006	MBC Best Theater: "Miss Kim's Boomerang"		
2006	Drama City: "Fog Street"		
2005	Drama City: "Don't Go Home Tonight"		
2005	Pharmacist Kim's Daughters	Kim Yong-Ok	
2004	Sweet Buns	Kim Sun-Hee	
2003	Age of Warriors		
2000	Because of You		
1999	The Boss		
1999	School 2		(guest, ep 22)
1996	Oxtail Soup		

=== Web series ===
Year	Title	Role	Notes	Ref.
2021	Shall We Have a Cup of Coffee		Cameo	
2022	Big Bet	Kang Min-jung		

== Theater ==
Theater play performances
Year	Title		Role	Venue	Date	Ref.
Year	English	Korean	Role	Venue	Date	Ref.
2014	Everything About My Wife	내 아내의 모든 것	Jeong-in	Yes24 Stage 2	May 5 – June 29	
2016	Almost, Maine	올모스트 메인	Glory, Waitress, Gayle, Marci	Sangmyung Art Hall 1	January 8 – July 3, 2016	
2016	Almost, Maine	올모스트 메인	Glory, Waitress, Gayle, Marci	Namdong Sorae Art Hall Grand Performance Hall	November 18–19	
2021	Lungs	렁스	Yeo-ja	Art One Theater 2	June 26 – September 5	
2023	3 Days of Rain	3일간의 비	Nan / Laina	Dongguk University Lee Haerang Arts Theater	July 25 – October 1	

== Awards and nominations ==
Name of the award ceremony, year presented, category, nominee of the award, and the result of the nomination
Award ceremony	Year	Category	Nominee / Work	Result	Ref.
SBS Drama Awards	2022	Best Supporting Team	Cheer Up	Won	
SBS Drama Awards	2023	Best Supporting Actress in a Miniseries Romance/Comedy Drama	Trolley	Nominated	
Scene Stealer Festival	2016	Bonsang (Main Prize)	The Lovers	Won	
Scene Stealer Festival	2023	Bonsang (Main Prize)	Trolley	Won	
University Film Festival of Korea	2010	Best Supporting Actress	The Servant	Won	
