= Ha Do-kwon =

South Korean actor (born 1977)

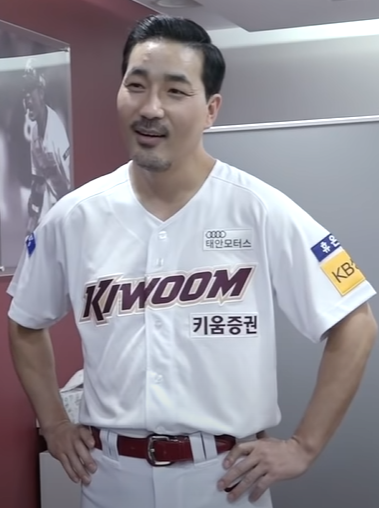
- Ha in May 2020
- Born: Kim Yong-goo; March 3, 1977 (age 49); South Korea
- Education: Seoul National University (Vocal Music)
- Occupation: Actor
- Years active: 2016–present
- Agent: Andmarq
- Spouse: Yeo Min-jeong (m. 2004)
- Children: 2

Korean name
- Hangul: 김용구
- RR: Gim Yonggu
- MR: Kim Yonggu

Stage name
- Hangul: 하도권
- RR: Ha Dogwon
- MR: Ha Togwŏn
- Website: andmarq.com

Kim Yong-goo (Korean: 김용구; born March 3, 1977), commonly known as Ha Do-kwon (하도권), is a South Korean actor. He is mainly known for his roles in Hot Stove League (2019–2020) and The Penthouse: War in Life (2020–2021).

== Education ==
Ha graduated from Seoul National University in 2004, majoring in vocal music.

== Personal life ==
On an episode of Same Bed, Different Dreams 2 aired on March 24, 2020, Ha revealed that he has been married to Yeo Min-jeong for 16 years.

== Filmography ==
=== Film ===
Year	Title	Role	Ref.
2016	The Map Against the World	Loan shark	
2017	Roman Holiday	Detective Lee	
2019	Vertigo	Malcom	

=== Television series ===
Year	Title	Role	Notes	Ref.
2016	Gogh, The Starry Night	Producer Kim Yoo-chan		
2017	Saimdang, Memoir of Colors	Butler		
2018	Still 17	Team coach for rowing club		
2018–2019	The Last Empress	Chu Ki-jung		
2019	Doctor John	Joo Hyung-woo	Cameo (Episode 3–4)	
2019–2020	Hot Stove League	Kang Doo-gi		
2020	Memorist	Gongryeong gang member	Cameo (Episode 1)	
2020	Zombie Detective	No Poong-sik		
2020–2021	The Penthouse: War in Life	Ma Du-ki	Season 1–3	
2021	Nevertheless	Yoon Seol-ah's brother	Cameo (Episode 4–5)	
2021	The Witch's Diner	CEO Oh / Lee Young-sook		
2021	Work Later, Drink Now		Cameo	
2022	Through the Darkness	Shin Ki-ho	Cameo	
2022	A Superior Day	Bae Tae-jin		
2022	Shooting Stars	Choi Ji-hoon		
2022	Bloody Heart	Jung Eui-kyun		
2022	Today's Webtoon	Heo Kwan-young		
2023	Tale of the Nine Tailed 1938	Ryuhei Kato		
2024	Marry My Husband	Lee Suk-Joon		
2026	Dive into You	Yoon Chang-sik		

=== Television show ===
Year	Title	Role	Note	Ref.
2020	King of Mask Singer	Contestant	As "Minyo" (Episode 251–252)	
2021	Law of the Jungle – Pent Island: Island of Desire	Cast member	Episodes 451–452	

== Awards and nominations ==
Name of the award ceremony, year presented, category, nominee of the award, and the result of the nomination
Award ceremony	Year	Category	Nominee / work	Result	Ref.
SBS Drama Awards	2020	Best Supporting Team (Note: with Ha Do-kwon, Yoon Sun-woo, Kim Soo-jin, Cha-yeop, Lee Jun-hyeok and Jo Han-sun)	Hot Stove League	Won	
SBS Drama Awards	2020	Best New Actor	Hot Stove League & The Penthouse: War in Life	Nominated	
