= My Scary Girl =

- Hangul: 달콤, 살벌한 연인
- Hanja: 달콤, 殺伐한 戀人
- RR: Dalkom, salbeolhan yeonin
- MR: Talk'om, salbŏrhan yŏnin
- Directed by: Son Jae-gon
- Written by: Son Jae-gon
- Produced by: Kim Kwon-tae; Kim Jeong-ho; Kim Nam-won
- Starring: Park Yong-woo; Choi Kang-hee
- Cinematography: Ha Jae-young
- Edited by: Shin Min-kyung
- Music by: Na Ha-na
- Production companies: Sidus Pictures; MBC Production
- Distributed by: CJ Entertainment
- Release date: April 6, 2006
- Running time: 110 minutes
- Country: South Korea
- Language: Korean
- Budget: US$800,000
- Box office: US$13,500,403

My Scary Girl (Korean: 달콤, 살벌한 연인; lit. "Sweet, Bloodthirsty Lover") is a 2006 South Korean black/romantic comedy film written and directed by Son Jae-gon.

With a relatively low budget and lead actors who were not particularly famous at the time, My Scary Girl became a sleeper hit and the tenth top-selling domestic film of the year with 2,286,745 tickets sold.

== Plot ==
29-year-old Hwang Dae-woo (Park Yong-woo) is a successful university lecturer of English, yet due to his awkward and shy nature around women, has yet to engage in any romantic relationship. When art major student Lee Mi-na (Choi Kang-hee) suddenly moves into his apartment complex, Dae-woo asks her out, and finds himself in an almost-too-good-to-be-true relationship. Yet, Mi-na seems to be hiding something sinister, and Dae-woo encounters a rather interesting twist to his fairy-tale-like first love.

== Cast ==
- Park Yong-woo as Hwang Dae-woo
- Choi Kang-hee as Lee Mi-na
- Jo Eun-ji as Baek Jang-mi
- Jung Kyung-ho as Kye-dong
- Jo Young-gyu as Sung-shik
- Lee Hee-do as Attorney Min
- Sunwoo Sun as Jung-hwa
- Jeon Se-hong as female employee's friend
- Kwak Min-seok as psychiatrist
- Kim Ki-cheon as truck driver
- Jo Seok-hyeon as neighborhood scamp
- Oh Yoo-jin as secretary

== Awards and nominations ==
2006 Busan Film Critics Awards

- Best Screenplay: Son Jae-gon

2006 Blue Dragon Film Awards

- Nomination - Best Actress: Choi Kang-hee
- Nomination - Best Screenplay: Son Jae-gon
- Nomination - Best New Director: Son Jae-gon

2006 Korean Film Awards

- Best Screenplay: Son Jae-gon

2006 Director's Cut Awards

- Best New Director: Son Jae-gon

2007 Asian Film Awards

- Nomination - Best Screenwriter: Son Jae-gon

2007 Baeksang Arts Awards

- Nomination - Best Screenplay: Son Jae-gon
- Nomination - Best New Director: Son Jae-gon

== Musical theatre adaptation ==
A musical based on My Scary Girl was selected for the second Daegu International Music Festival. Its book and lyrics were written by Kang Kyoung-ae, and music composed by Will Aronson. The show received funding for further development and was performed publicly at the Daegu Bongsan Culture Center from July 5 to 6, 2008. A full production ran in Seoul in 2009, starring Shin Sung-rok. The show was designated Best Original Musical in the small theater category at the 2009 Korea Musical Awards.

An American version of the musical was selected by the Barrington Stage Company for the 2008 Musical Theater Lab. This workshop production was performed from July 10 to 26, 2008. This version had a book written by Kang Kyoung-ae and Mark St. Germain, music composed by Will Aronson, lyrics written by Kang Kyoung-ae, and additional lyrics contributed by William Finn.

As part of an international exchange program with the Daegu International Musical Festival, the New York Musical Theatre Festival presented the Korean version of My Scary Girl on October 1 to 4, 2009 at the Acorn Theater in New York City. My Scary Girl was selected as the Outstanding New Musical in the festival. In addition, Bang Jin-ui won an award for Outstanding Individual Performance, and Honorable Mention citations were earned by Will Aronson for Excellence in Writing: Music, Kang Kyoung-ae for Excellence in Writing: Book, Byun Jung-joo for Excellence in Direction, and the cast for Outstanding Ensemble Performance.
