= Hot Stove League =

2019 South Korean television series

- Promotional poster
- Hangul: 스토브리그
- Lit.: Stove League
- RR: Seutobeu rigeu
- MR: Sŭt'obŭ rigŭ
- Genre: Sports drama
- Developed by: Han Jung-hwan
- Written by: Lee Shin-hwa
- Directed by: Jung Dong-yoon
- Starring: Namkoong Min; Park Eun-bin; Oh Jung-se; Jo Byeong-kyu
- Music by: Park Se-joon
- Opening theme: "Cue Sign" by Lee Won-suk
- Country of origin: South Korea
- Original language: Korean
- No. of episodes: 16

Production
- Executive producers: Hong Sung-chang; Park Min-yeop
- Producer: Jo Eun-jung
- Production locations: Incheon; Hawaii
- Running time: 59–63 minutes
- Production company: Gill Pictures

Original release
- Network: SBS TV
- Release: December 13, 2019 – February 14, 2020

Hot Stove League (Korean: 스토브리그) is a South Korean television series that aired on SBS TV from December 13, 2019, to February 14, 2020. The series stars Namkoong Min, Park Eun-bin, Oh Jung-se, and Jo Byeong-kyu. It revolves around a baseball team named Dreams, which has been the worst in the league for four consecutive years.

Hot Stove League received critical acclaim and several awards, including Best Drama at the 56th Baeksang Arts Awards. Namkoong won his first Grand Prize (Daesang) at the 28th SBS Drama Awards.

== Synopsis ==
The Dreams are a Korean professional baseball team that have placed last in the league for the past four seasons. When their general manager steps down, the team hires Baek Seung-soo, who has managed several championship winning sports teams, as his replacement, despite Seung-soo having zero experience with managing a baseball team. Facing shrinking budgets, infighting between the coaching staff and a team deeply set in their ways, Seung-soo uses his outsider's insight and the help of operations manager Se-young and Jae-hee to upend the Dreams' culture in a bid to create a championship winning team, despite the looming fact that every team he has managed before has folded after winning the championship.

== Cast ==
=== Main ===
- Namkoong Min as Baek Seung-soo

The new general manager of the Dreams who was hired despite having zero experience managing a baseball team. He has a "golden resume", leading wrestling, ice hockey and handball teams to championships, but they all end up folding afterwards due to circumstances outside his control. He doesn't have a particularly nice personality but he is determined to make the team the best in the league.

- Park Eun-bin as Lee Se-young

The Dreams' operations manager. She is the only female manager in the league and is very passionate about her team despite their poor fortunes. Though she has been working in this field for ten years, she never gives up.

- Oh Jung-se as Kwon Kyeong-min

The president of the team and a junior managing director with Jaesong Group, which owns the Dreams, and the nephew of its chairman. He plans to shut down the Dreams as it is unprofitable, and hires Baek Seung-soo to help him do so, but soon comes into conflict with him when Seung-soo puts real effort into making the team successful.

- Jo Byeong-kyu as Han Jae-hee

Se-young's co-worker at the operations team. He got the job through his connections, but as time goes by he shows his passion for the team and works hard. It is suggested that the reason for his change in attitude is because he likes Se-young.

=== Supporting ===
==== Dreams office ====
- Son Jong-hak as Go Kang-seon, CEO of the Dreams team.
- Lee Jun-hyeok as Go Se-hyeok, scout team leader.
- Yoon Byung-hee as Yang Won-seop, scout team member.
- Kim Do-hyun as Yoo Kyeong-taek, analysis team leader.
- Kim Soo-jin as Lim Mi-seon, head of marketing team.
- Park Jin-woo as Byeon Chi-hoon, marketing team leader.
- Kim Ki-moo as Jang Woo-seok, scout team deputy head.

==== Dreams players ====
- Hong Ki-joon as Jang Jin-woo, the oldest pitcher.
- Chae Jong-hyeop as Yoo Min-ho, a rising pitcher.
- Jo Han-sun as Lim Dong-gyu, a cleanup hitter.
- Cha Yup as Seo Yeong-joo, the chief catcher.
- Kim Dong-won as Kwak Han-young, an infielder.

==== Dreams coaching staff ====
- Lee Eol as Yoon Seong-bok, the head coach.
- Son Kwang-up as Choi Yong-goo, the pitching coach.
- Kim Min-sang as Lee Cheol-min, the bench coach.
- Seo Ho-chul as Min Tae-seong, the batting coach.

==== Baseball officials ====
- Lee Dae-yeon as Kim Jong-moo, general manager of the Vikings.
- Song Young-kyu as Oh Sang-hoon, general manager of the Pelicans.
- Park So-jin as Kim Yeong-chae, a sports announcer.
- Ha Do-kwon as Kang Doo-gi, the national team's ace pitcher.
- Kim Kang-min as Lee Chang-kwon, Vikings player.

==== Others ====
- Kim Jung-hwa as Yoo Jeong-in, Seung-soo's ex-wife.
- Yoon Sun-woo as Baek Yeong-soo, Seung-soo's little brother. An expert in sabermetrics, he uses a wheelchair due to a baseball injury as a teenager.
- Yoon Bok-in as Jeong Mi-sook, Se-yeong's mother.
- Jun Gook-hwan as Kwon Il-do, Jaesong Group chairman.
- Lee Kyu-ho as Cheon Heung-man, a former wrestler who knows Seung-soo.
- Lee Yong-woo as Gil Chang-joo / Robert Gil, a translator and a disgraced former pitcher.
- Moon Won-joo as Kim Ki-beom, retired dreams player

=== Special appearances ===
- Lee Je-hoon as Lee Je-hoon, CEO of PF Soft (Ep. 16)
- Pengsoo as Pengsoo (Ep. 16)

== Production ==
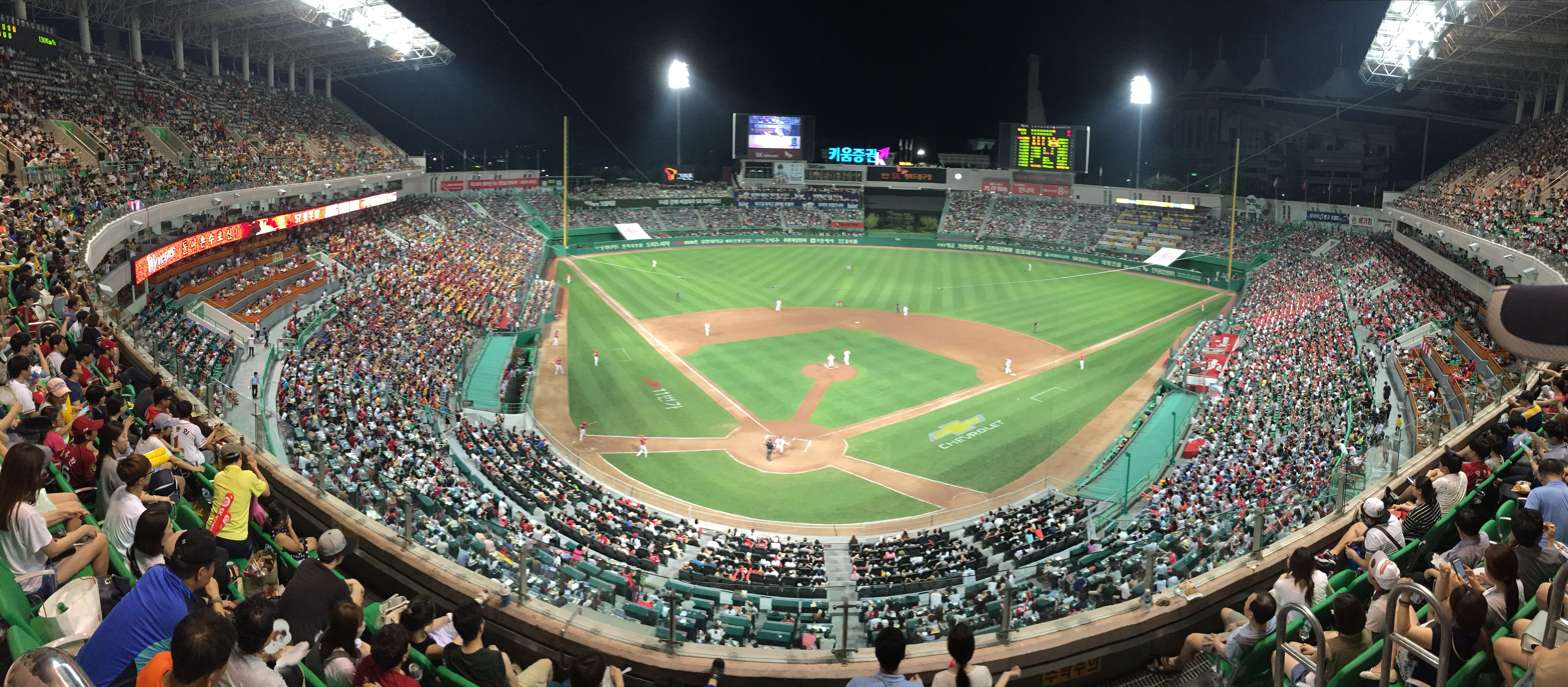
Picture of Munhak Baseball Stadium (Incheon, South Korea) where filming took place.

The series is based on Lee Shin-hwa's screenplay, which was one of the winners in the 2H 2016 MBC Drama Screenplay Contest (Miniseries Category).

Namkoong Min and Park Eun-bin previously worked together as second leads in Hur Jun, The Original Story (2013).

Munhak Baseball Stadium, home stadium of the South Korean professional baseball team SK Wyverns who gave their support to the series, served as a filming location and was used in one teaser poster. Scenes taking place in California were filmed in Hawaii.

After episodes 10 and 11 were divided into three parts instead of two, viewers expressed their discontent concerning the advertisements on the program's website.

Following the success of the drama, the cast and crew went on a four-day reward vacation to Saipan on February 17, 2020.

== Original soundtrack ==
Hot Stove League OST

Soundtrack album by Various artists
- Released: 20 December 2019–31 January 2020
- Genre: Soundtrack
- Languages: Korean; English
- Labels: Blending Co., Ltd. SBS Content Hub Co., Ltd.

=== Part 1 ===
Released on December 20, 2019
No.	Title	Lyrics	Music	Artist	Length
1.	"Cue Sign" (큐사인)	Park Se-joon; Woo Ji-hoon	Park Se-joon; Woo Ji-hoon	Lee Won-suk (Daybreak)	4:51
2.	"Cue Sign" (Inst.)		Park Se-joon; Woo Ji-hoon		4:51
Total length:					9:42

=== Part 2 ===
Released on January 3, 2020
No.	Title	Lyrics	Music	Artist	Length
1.	"Mind"	OneTop	OneTop	Kevin Oh	4:01
2.	"Mind" (Inst.)		OneTop		4:01
Total length:					8:02

=== Part 3 ===
Released on January 10, 2020
No.	Title	Lyrics	Music	Artist	Length
1.	"As The Cold Wind Passes" (찬바람이 스쳐가며)	Han Joon; Park Se-joon	Lee Yu-jin; Park Se-joon	Oliver	3:30
2.	"As The Cold Wind Passes" (Inst.)		Lee Yu-jin; Park Se-joon		3:30
Total length:					7:00

=== Part 4 ===
Released on January 17, 2020
No.	Title	Lyrics	Music	Artist	Length
1.	"Another Day Is Passing" (하루가 저물어간다)	Jung Sung-min; Shin Ji-hoo	Jung Sung-min; Shin Ji-hoo	Kim Tae-hyun (DickPunks)	3:46
2.	"Another Day Is Passing" (Inst.)		Jung Sung-min; Shin Ji-hoo		3:46
Total length:					7:32

=== Part 5 ===
Released on January 31, 2020
No.	Title	Lyrics	Music	Artist	Length
1.	"Down"	U.je	ZigZag Note; U.je	Savina & Drones	3:23
2.	"Down" (Inst.)		ZigZag Note; U.je		3:23
Total length:					6:46

== Viewership ==
Hot Stove League : South Korea viewers per episode (millions)

Season	Episode number																Average
Season	1	2	3	4	5	6	7	8	9	10	11	12	13	14	15	16	Average
1	0.943	1.502	1.811	2.244	2.219	2.729	2.769	2.862	3.277	3.260	3.333	3.016	3.256	3.274	3.528	3.921	2.747

Source: Audience measurement performed nationwide by Nielsen Media Research.

Average TV viewership ratings
Ep.	Part	Original broadcast date	Title	Average audience share (AGB Nielsen)	
Ep.	Part	Original broadcast date	Title	Nationwide	Seoul
1	1	December 13, 2019	My Name Is Baek Seung-soo And I'm the General Manager (단장 백승수입니다)	3.3% (NR)	—N/a
1	2	December 13, 2019	My Name Is Baek Seung-soo And I'm the General Manager (단장 백승수입니다)	5.5% (16th)	5.8% (13th)
2	1	December 14, 2019	I am Going to Trade Lim Dong-gyu (임동규 선수를 트레이드하겠습니다)	5.5% (NR)	—N/a
2	2	December 14, 2019	I am Going to Trade Lim Dong-gyu (임동규 선수를 트레이드하겠습니다)	7.8% (11th)	8.3% (7th)
3	1	December 20, 2019	It's a Team That's Bad at Baseball and Also Without a Future (야구는 제일 못하는데, 미래도 없는 팀)	7.3% (14th)	8.3% (10th)
3	2	December 20, 2019	It's a Team That's Bad at Baseball and Also Without a Future (야구는 제일 못하는데, 미래도 없는 팀)	9.6% (6th)	10.3% (4th)
4	1	December 21, 2019	I'd Say It's an Unprecedented Scouting Scandal of a Professional Team (전례 없는 프로팀 스카우트 비리가 아닐까 싶습니다)	8.2% (10th)	8.5% (9th)
4	2	December 21, 2019	I'd Say It's an Unprecedented Scouting Scandal of a Professional Team (전례 없는 프로팀 스카우트 비리가 아닐까 싶습니다)	11.4% (3rd)	11.9% (3rd)
5	1	December 27, 2019	Do You Want to Make a Bet? Let's See Who Is Laughing When We Arrive In Korea (내기하실까요, 귀국길에 웃는 게 누군지?)	9.6% (6th)	10.1% (4th)
5	2	December 27, 2019	Do You Want to Make a Bet? Let's See Who Is Laughing When We Arrive In Korea (내기하실까요, 귀국길에 웃는 게 누군지?)	12.4% (2nd)	12.9% (2nd)
6	1	January 3, 2020 (Note: Broadcast is delayed due to the 2019 SBS Entertainment Awards broadcast.)	Did You Bring Someone Problematic From America? (미국에서 뭐 문제 있는 애 데리고 왔어?)	11.6% (6th)	13.1% (4th)
6	2	January 3, 2020	Did You Bring Someone Problematic From America? (미국에서 뭐 문제 있는 애 데리고 왔어?)	14.1% (2nd)	15.4% (2nd)
7	1	January 4, 2020	Cut a Little Bit Larger (삭감 폭이 좀 큽니다)	11.3% (4th)	12.5% (4th)
7	2	January 4, 2020	Cut a Little Bit Larger (삭감 폭이 좀 큽니다)	13.8% (3rd)	15.1% (3rd)
8	1	January 10, 2020	How Much Do You Want? (얼마를 받아야 되는 겁니까)	12.2% (6th)	13.7% (4th)
8	2	January 10, 2020	How Much Do You Want? (얼마를 받아야 되는 겁니까)	14.9% (2nd)	16.3% (2nd)
9	1	January 11, 2020	Thank You For Letting Me Dream For A Brief Moment, Baek Seung-soo (잠시나마 꿈을 꾸게 해줘서 감사합니다, 백승수씨)	11.8% (4th)	13.2% (4th)
9	2	January 11, 2020	Thank You For Letting Me Dream For A Brief Moment, Baek Seung-soo (잠시나마 꿈을 꾸게 해줘서 감사합니다, 백승수씨)	15.5% (3rd)	17.0% (3rd)
10	1	January 17, 2020	Are We Evil? (우리가 적폐입니까?)	12.9% (5th)	14.1% (4th)
10	2	January 17, 2020	Are We Evil? (우리가 적폐입니까?)	15.5% (3rd)	16.6% (2nd)
10	3	January 17, 2020	Are We Evil? (우리가 적폐입니까?)	17.0% (2nd)	18.4% (1st)
11	1	January 18, 2020	What Difference Does It Make If I Bring Them In? (얘네들 데려오면 뭐가 달라져?)	10.7% (6th)	11.6% (5th)
11	2	January 18, 2020	What Difference Does It Make If I Bring Them In? (얘네들 데려오면 뭐가 달라져?)	13.5% (4th)	14.5% (4th)
11	3	January 18, 2020	What Difference Does It Make If I Bring Them In? (얘네들 데려오면 뭐가 달라져?)	16.5% (3rd)	18.1% (3rd)
12	1	January 31, 2020 (Note: Broadcast is delayed due to the 2020 Lunar New Year special broadcast.)	Lim Dong-gyu VS Kang Doo-gi (임동규 대 강두기)	12.0% (6th)	13.0% (4th)
12	2	January 31, 2020	Lim Dong-gyu VS Kang Doo-gi (임동규 대 강두기)	14.4% (3rd)	15.2% (3rd)
12	3	January 31, 2020	Lim Dong-gyu VS Kang Doo-gi (임동규 대 강두기)	15.3% (2nd)	15.5% (2nd)
13	1	February 1, 2020	I Trust Him, I'm Going to Check Whether the Rumors are True or Not (믿지만 확인은 할 겁니다)	10.1% (6th)	11.2% (5th)
13	2	February 1, 2020	I Trust Him, I'm Going to Check Whether the Rumors are True or Not (믿지만 확인은 할 겁니다)	11.9% (4th)	12.9% (4th)
13	3	February 1, 2020	I Trust Him, I'm Going to Check Whether the Rumors are True or Not (믿지만 확인은 할 겁니다)	16.0% (3rd)	17.4% (3rd)
14	1	February 7, 2020	The Reason Why We Must Bring Back Lim Dong-gyu (임동규를 다시 데려와야 하는 이유)	13.2% (6th)	14.4% (4th)
14	2	February 7, 2020	The Reason Why We Must Bring Back Lim Dong-gyu (임동규를 다시 데려와야 하는 이유)	15.1% (3rd)	15.8% (3rd)
14	3	February 7, 2020	The Reason Why We Must Bring Back Lim Dong-gyu (임동규를 다시 데려와야 하는 이유)	16.6% (2nd)	17.2% (2nd)
15	1	February 8, 2020	I'm Trying To Protect The Dreams At All Costs (어떻게든 드림즈를 지키려고 합니다)	10.6% (6th)	11.6% (5th)
15	2	February 8, 2020	I'm Trying To Protect The Dreams At All Costs (어떻게든 드림즈를 지키려고 합니다)	13.6% (4th)	14.6% (4th)
15	3	February 8, 2020	I'm Trying To Protect The Dreams At All Costs (어떻게든 드림즈를 지키려고 합니다)	16.8% (3rd)	18.2% (3rd)
16	1	February 14, 2020	The Best Is For Sale (최선은 매각입니다)	14.8% (5th)	15.8% (4th)
16	2	February 14, 2020	The Best Is For Sale (최선은 매각입니다)	17.2% (3rd)	18.3% (3rd)
16	3	February 14, 2020	The Best Is For Sale (최선은 매각입니다)	19.1% (2nd)	20.8% (1st)
Average				12.5%	— (Note: Due to some ratings not recorded, the exact average rating is unknown.)
Special		December 7, 2019	Hot Stove League Scout Report (스토브리그 스카우트 리포트)	2.6% (NR)	—N/a
Special		February 15, 2020	Hot Stove League Final Report (스토브리그 파이널 리포트)	3.9% (NR)	—N/a
Special		February 15, 2020	Hot Stove League Final Report (스토브리그 파이널 리포트)	5.8% (NR)	—N/a
In the table above, the blue numbers represent the lowest ratings and the red numbers represent the highest ratings.; NR denotes that the drama did not rank in the top 20 daily programs on that date.; N/A denotes that the rating is not known.

== Awards and nominations ==
Year	Award	Category	Recipient	Result	Ref.
2020	The 241st PD Award of the Month	PD of the Month	Jeong Dong-yoon	Won	
2020	The 241st PD Award of the Month	PD of the Month	Lee Shin-hwa	Won	
2020	56th Baeksang Arts Awards	Best Drama	Stove League	Won	
2020	56th Baeksang Arts Awards	Best Director (TV)	Jeong Dong-yoon	Nominated	
2020	56th Baeksang Arts Awards	Best Actor (TV)	Namkoong Min	Nominated	
2020	56th Baeksang Arts Awards	Best Screenplay (TV)	Lee Shin-hwa	Nominated	
2020	47th Korean Broadcasting Awards	Best Drama TV	Stove League	Nominated	
2020	47th Korean Broadcasting Awards	Best Art	Lee Yong-tak	Won	
2020	15th Seoul International Drama Awards	Best Mini-Series	Stove League	Nominated	
2020	15th Seoul International Drama Awards	Outstanding Korean Drama	Stove League	Won	
2020	15th Seoul International Drama Awards	Best Director	Jeong Dong-yoon	Nominated	
2020	33rd Grimae Awards	Best Picture (Drama)	Stove League	Won	
2020	33rd Grimae Awards	Best Actor	Namkoong Min	Won	
2020	33rd Grimae Awards	Best Actress	Park Eun-bin	Won	
2020	33rd Grimae Awards	Best Lighting	Choi Jong-geun	Won	
2020	14th Media Awards	Excellence Award in a Terrestrial Content Drama	Stove League	Won	
2020	SBS Drama Awards	Grand Prize (Daesang)	Namkoong Min	Won	
2020	SBS Drama Awards	Top Excellence Award, Actor in a Miniseries Genre/Action Drama	Namkoong Min	Nominated	
2020	SBS Drama Awards	Excellence Award, Actor in a Miniseries Genre/Action Drama	Oh Jung-se	Nominated	
2020	SBS Drama Awards	Excellence Award, Actress in a Miniseries Genre/Action Drama	Park Eun-bin	Nominated	
2020	SBS Drama Awards	Best Character Award, Actor	Oh Jung-se	Won	
2020	SBS Drama Awards	Best Supporting Actor	Jo Han-sun	Nominated	
2020	SBS Drama Awards	Best Supporting Team	Stove League	Won	
2020	SBS Drama Awards	Best New Actor	Jo Byung-gyu	Won	
2020	SBS Drama Awards	Best New Actor	Ha Do-kwon	Nominated	
2021	25th Asian Television Awards	Best Drama Series	Stove League	Nominated	
2021	7th APAN Star Awards	Top Excellent Actor in a Miniseries	Namkoong Min	Nominated	
2021	7th APAN Star Awards	Excellent Actress in a Miniseries	Park Eun-bin	Nominated	
2021	7th APAN Star Awards	Best Supporting Actor	Oh Jung-se	Won	
2021	7th APAN Star Awards	Best Writer	Lee Shin Hwa	Won	
2021	SBS Commendation	Audience satisfaction target	Stove League	Won	
2021	33rd Korea PD Awards	Best word for drama	Stove League	Won	
2021	33rd Korea PD Awards	Talented actor	Namkoong Min	Won	
2021	WorldFest-Houston International Film Festival	Platinum Remi for TV series	Stove League	Won	

== See also ==
- Ted Lasso, American comedy series about an American football coach recruited by an English soccer team despite having no experience with the sport
