= 2020 SBS Drama Awards =

28th edition of award ceremony

- Title card
- Date: 31 December 2020
- Site: SBS Prism Tower, Sangam-dong, Mapo-gu, Seoul
- Hosted by: Shin Dong-yup; Kim Yoo-jung
- Preshow hosts: Park Eun-bin; Jo Byung-gyu
- Directed by: Jang Seok-jin; Park Miyeon
- Official website: 2020 SBS Drama

Highlights
- Grand Prize (Daesang): Namgoong Min
- Most awards: The Penthouse: War in Life

Television coverage
- Network: SBS
- Viewership: 1.48 million people

The 2020 SBS Drama Awards, presented by Seoul Broadcasting System (SBS), was held on 31 December 2020 at 21.00 (KST) at SBS Prism Tower, Sangam-dong, Mapo-gu, Seoul. This year being the 30th anniversary of the founding of SBS, the awards ceremony was announced by Park Eun-bin and Jo Byung-gyu in a teaser on 17 December 2020. The show was hosted by Shin Dong-yup and Kim Yoo-jung. In order to observe COVID-19 pandemic safety protocols, the awards presentation was held without an on-site audience.

== Winners and nominees ==
- (Winners denoted in **bold**)
  - (Nominees)

| Grand Prize (Daesang) | Producer Award |
|---|---|
| **Namgoong Min – Hot Stove League**; Han Suk-kyu – Dr. Romantic 2; Joo Won – Alice; Ju Ji-hoon – Hyena; Kim Hee-sun – Alice; Kim Hye-soo – Hyena; Kim So-yeon – The Penthouse: War in Life | **Joo Won – Alice** |
| Top Excellence Award, Actor in a Miniseries Fantasy/Romance Drama | Top Excellence Award, Actress in a Miniseries Fantasy/Romance Drama |
| **Lee Min-ho – The King: Eternal Monarch**; Joo Won – Alice; Ji Chang-wook – Backstreet Rookie | **Park Eun-bin – Do You Like Brahms?**; Kim Go-eun – The King: Eternal Monarch; Kim Hee-sun – Alice |
| Top Excellence Award, Actor in a Miniseries Genre/Action Drama | Top Excellence Award, Actress in a Miniseries Genre/Action Drama |
| **Ju Ji-hoon – Hyena**; Namgoong Min – Hot Stove League; Ryu Deok-hwan – Nobody Knows; Lee Sang-yeob – Good Casting; Han Suk-kyu – Dr. Romantic 2 | **Kim Seo-hyung – Nobody Knows**; Kim Hye-soo – Hyena; Choi Kang-hee – Good Casting |
| Top Excellence Award, Actor in a Mid/Long-length Drama | Top Excellence Award, Actress in a Mid/Long-length Drama |
| **Uhm Ki-joon – The Penthouse: War in Life**; Kwon Sang-woo – Delayed Justice; Lee Jae-woo – Phoenix 2020 | **Kim So-yeon, Eugene, and Lee Ji-ah – The Penthouse: War in Life**; Hong Soo-ah – Phoenix 2020 |
| Excellence Award, Actor in a Miniseries Fantasy/Romance Drama | Excellence Award, Actress in a Miniseries Fantasy/Romance Drama |
| **Kim Min-jae – Do You Like Brahms?**; Kwak Si-yang – Alice; Woo Do-hwan – The King: Eternal Monarch; Lee Jung-jin – The King: Eternal Monarch | **Kim Yoo-jung – Backstreet Rookie**; Lee Da-in – Alice; Jung Eun-chae – The King: Eternal Monarch; Han Sun-hwa – Backstreet Rookie |
| Excellence Award, Actor in a Miniseries Genre/Action Drama | Excellence Award, Actress in a Miniseries Genre/Action Drama |
| **Ahn Hyo-seop – Dr. Romantic 2**; Park Hoon – Nobody Knows; Oh Jung-se – Hot Stove League; Lee Jong-hyeok – Good Casting | **Lee Sung-kyung – Dr. Romantic 2**; Kim Ji-young – Good Casting; Park Eun-bin – Hot Stove League; Jang Young-nam – Nobody Knows |
| Excellence Award, Actor in a Mid/Long-length Drama | Excellence Award, Actress in a Mid/Long-length Drama |
| **Bong Tae-gyu and Yoon Jong-hoon – The Penthouse: War in Life**; Seo Ha-jun – Phoenix 2020; Jung Woong-in – Delayed Justice | **Shin Eun-kyung – The Penthouse: War in Life**; Kim Ju-hyeon – Delayed Justice; Hyun Jyu-ni – Mom Has an Affair |
| Best Supporting Actor | Best Supporting Actress |
| **Kim Joo-hun – Dr. Romantic 2**; **Park Eun-seok – The Penthouse: War in Life**; Jo Han-sun – Hot Stove League; Kim Sang-ho – Alice | **Jin Kyung – Dr. Romantic 2**; Yoon Joo-hee – The Penthouse: War in Life; Kim Yong-ji – The King: Eternal Monarch; Oh Kyung-hwa – Hyena |
| Best Character Award, Actor | Best Character Award, Actress |
| **Oh Jung-se – Hot Stove League** | **Choi Kang-hee – Good Casting** |
| Best Supporting Team | Best Couple Award |
| **Hot Stove League**; Dr. Romantic 2; Penthouse; Hyena | **Park Eun-bin and Kim Min-jae – Do You Like Brahms?**; Kim Yoo-jung and Ji Chang-wook – Backstreet Rookie; Kim Go-eun and Lee Min-ho – The King: Eternal Monarch; Kim Hye-soo and Ju Ji-hoon – Hyena; Lee Sung-kyung and Ahn Hyo-seop – Dr. Romantic 2 |
| Best Young Actor | Best Young Actress |
| **Ahn Ji-ho – Nobody Knows** | **Kim Hyun-soo – The Penthouse: War in Life** |
| Best New Actor | Best New Actress |
| **Cho Byeong-kyu – Hot Stove League**; Ha Do-kwon – Hot Stove League, The Penthouse: War in Life; Kim Sung-cheol – Do You Like Brahms?; Kim Young-dae – The Penthouse: War in Life; Lee Jun-young – Good Casting | **So Joo-yeon – Dr. Romantic 2**; Jo Soo-min – The Penthouse: War in Life; Park Ji-hyun – Do You Like Brahms?; Seo Ye-hwa – Backstreet Rookie |

== Special performances ==
| Order | Artist | Song/Spectacle | Ref. |
|---|---|---|---|
| 1 | Kim Min-jae | Piano performance "Träumerei" | |
| 2 | Ha Do-kwon, Ko So-hyun | I believe | |
| 3 | Kang Sung | "Nighty Age" | |
| 4 | Baek Ji-young | "That Woman" | |

== See also ==
- 2020 KBS Drama Awards
- 2020 MBC Drama Awards
- 7th APAN Star Awards
