= Prain Global =

South Korean public relations company

Prain Global Inc.
- Native name: 주식회사 프레인 글로벌
- Type: Private company
- Industry: Public relations (core)
- Founded: Seoul, South Korea (July 2000)
- Founder: Yeo Jun-Young
- Headquarters: Jongno District, Seoul, South Korea
- Area served: South Korea
- Key people: Yeo Jun-young (founder and CEO)
- Services: public relations advertising artist management film distribution
- Subsidiaries: See the list
- Website: Prain.com/ PCG.kr/

Prain Global Inc. (Hangul:주식회사 프레인 글로벌) is a South Korean public relations company, founded by Jun-young Yeo in July 2000. It is the parent company of Prain Consulting Group (PCG).

In 2021, Prain Global was ranked 73rd on the Global Top 250 PR Agency Ranking.

== Prain Consulting Group ==
The Prain Consulting Group is the group of companies under Prain Global.

- Prain Global - Public relations(Site)
- Prain IMC - integrated marketing communications
- Prain TPC - artist management (Facebook) (@PrainTPC on Twitter)
- Prain Movie - film distribution (Facebook)
- Prain Sports - sports marketing
- Prain & Rhee - research, consulting
- Prain F&B - food and baking franchisee
  - Purearena (Blogger Korea)
- TREY - hybrid public relations (Tistory)
- Markers BX - branding (Tistory)
- Markers UX - digital agency (Tistory)
- PCG Academy - educational institution
- PCG HQ - business incubator
- Sticky Monster Lab - animation studio (Facebook) (Vimeo)

== Clients (as of 2022) ==
=== Government & public sector ===
- The National Institute of Korean Language
- Ministry of Economy and Finance
- Ministry of Culture, Sports and Tourism
- Ministry of Government Legislation
- Ministry of Health and Welfare
- Seoul City Hall
- Child Rights Security Agency
- Ministry of Foreign Affairs
- United Nations World Food Programme
- Incheon International Airport Corporation
- Statistics Korea

=== Consumer products & retail ===
- Gong Cha
- Kia
- Nu Skin Korea
- Danone Nutricia
- Dr.jart+
- Dongsuh Foods
- Monami
- Michelin Korea
- Volvo Cars
- SKIN1004
- Simmons
- Aromatica
- APR
- Yuhan-Kimberly
- Dr.Chung’s Food
- Zero to Seven
- Zespri Korea
- Cardoc
- Pernod Ricard Korea
- POSCO
- PLEATS MAMA
- K CAR
- FromBIO
- 11Street

=== Corporate ===
- Neovalue
- Digital Daesung
- Ssangyong C&E
- Alibaba
- UBASE
- Electronic Arts Korea
- DL
- DTR
- SK Group

=== Technology & digital ===
- Riot Games
- Roborock Korea
- Samsung
- Sejong Telecom
- Onestore
- Keywe
- Thinkware
- Plus-ex
- KIES
- Fujifilm
- KIAST
- E-pit
- SK Telecom
- TESSA

=== Healthcare ===
- Daewoong
- Korean Association of Interpreters and Presidents
- Korean Society for Lung Arterial Research
- Dongkook
- Mundipharma
- Sanofi Aventis
- Sanofi Pasteur
- Smail Pharm
- Takeda
- Roche
- AbbVie
- HANALL Biopharma
- MSD
- Novartis
- GSK

=== Travel, leisure & sports ===
- Expedia
- Fairmont Ambassador Seoul
- Finnair

=== Media & entertainment ===
- TikTok
- FLO
- LYCHEE&FRIENDS

=== Financial services & others ===
- JT Chinae Bank
- Forestry and Fisheries Food Education and Culture Information Service
- Solt
- ESG

== Honors ==
2017

- 2017 The Holmes Report - ‘North Asia Consultancy of the year’-The Holmes Report
- 2017 Asia Pacific SABRE Awards - Gold Award in ‘Public Affairs’ (Ministry of Health and Welfare, ‘Ga Na Da campaign, to promote and raise awareness for low fertility compared to an aging society)
- The Korean Advertising & PR Practitioners Society - ‘2017 PR Agency of the Year’
- Award of Excellence in Advertising and Public Service Campaign, Korea Communications Grand Prize (Ministry of Culture, Sports and Tourism, Hello Policy Project – Online viral video on communication)

2016

- Korean Academic Society for Public Relations Excellence Award -’Best PR Practice Award 2016’ by the (Grevin Seoul)
- 2016 PR Week Asia Silver Winner of the Southeast Asia PR Campaign of the Year in 2016 (Crossing Cultural Borders: Promoting Korean Halal Foods in Indonesia of Korea Agro-Fisheries&Food Trade Corporation)
- 6th Korea Social Network Service Award - Grand Prize winner in Manufacturer category by (Posco)
- 2016 Korea PR Association Award - Grand Prize winner (Ministry of Health and Welfare’s Aging Society and Population Policy campaign, ‘Ga, Na, Da campaign’)
- 2016 Korea PR Association Award - ‘PR Agency of the Year’

2015

- Award of Excellence in PR-Event Sector Outstanding Performance, Korea Communications Grand Prize (MSD Rotateq)
- Best Company in Promotion Opportunity & Possibility Sector, Fortune & Jobplanet

2014

- This Year’s Best PR Agency by Korean University Students’ PR Association
- Grand Prize, in 2014 Korea PR Association Awards (Campaign of Ministry of Employment and Labor)
- Sungbong Lee, Vice-chairman of Prain, selected as ‘The 50 Most Influential People in PR’ by PR Week
- Korean Consultancy of the Year by Asia Pacific SABRE Awards
