= 2025 MBC Drama Awards =

44th edition of award ceremony

- Official poster
- Date: December 30, 2025
- Site: MBC Media Center Public Hall, Sangam-dong, Mapo-gu, Seoul
- Hosted by: Kim Sung-joo; Lee Sun-bin
- Official website: MBC Drama Awards

Highlights
- Grand Prize (Daesang): Seo Kang-joon – Undercover High School

Television coverage
- Network: MBC; Naver Now; YouTube
- Viewership: Ratings: 2.9%; Viewership: 485,000

The 2025 MBC Drama Awards, presented by Munhwa Broadcasting Corporation (MBC) took place at MBC Media Center Public Hall in Sangam-dong, Mapo-gu, Seoul on December 30, 2025. Kim Sung-joo hosted the award ceremony seventh year in succession along with actress and singer Lee Sun-bin, who returned to the awards after eight years.

Jaurim appeared at the award ceremony to present a congratulatory stage performance.

== Winners and nominees ==
Nominations for the best couple award were revealed on December 15, 2025.

Winners are listed first and denoted in bold.

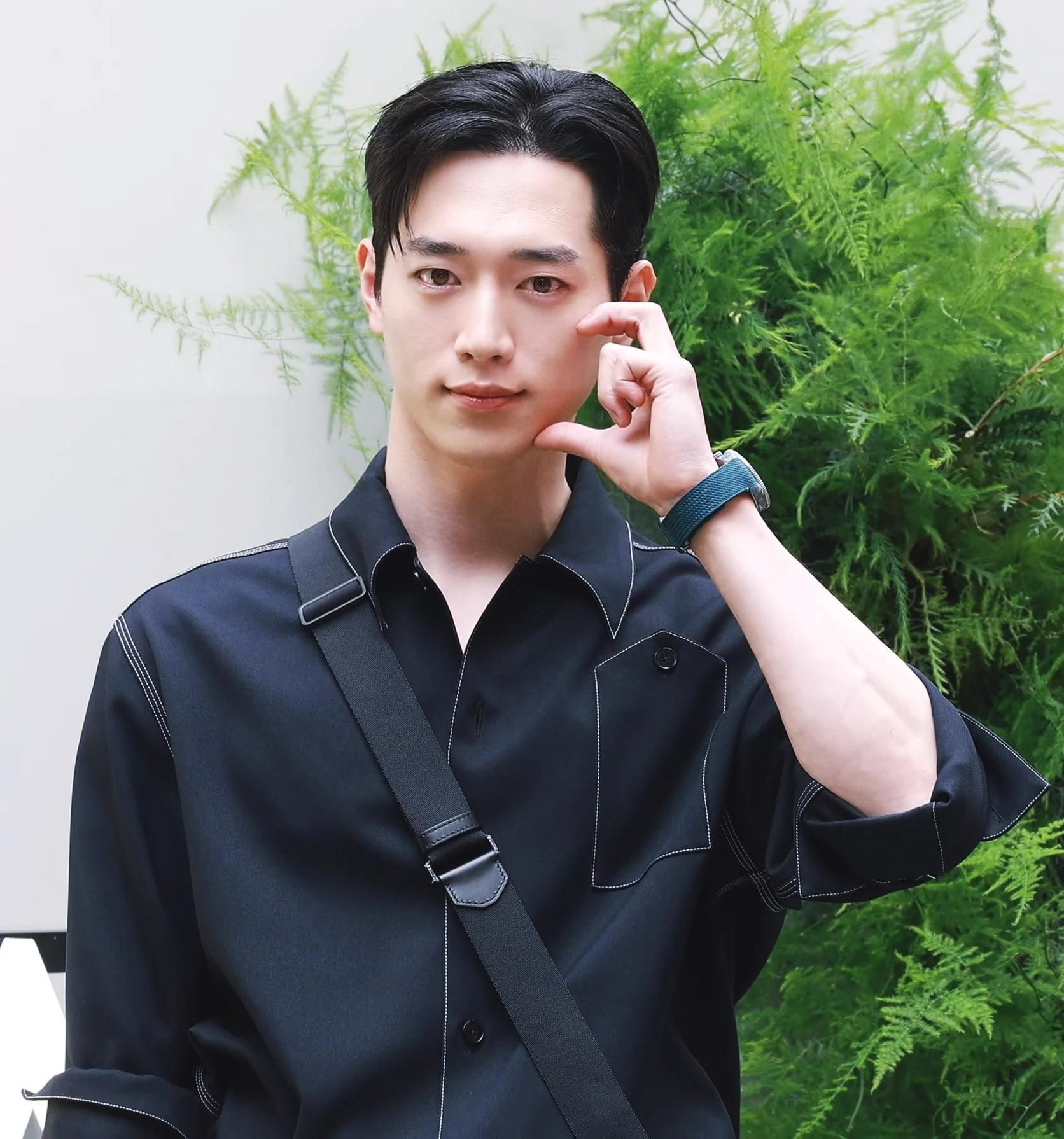
Seo Kang-joon, winner of Grand Prize (Daesang)

| Grand Prize (Daesang) | Drama of the Year |
|---|---|
| **Seo Kang-joon** – **Undercover High School**; Jung Kyung-ho – Oh My Ghost Clients; Kang Tae-oh – Moon River; Kim Se-jeong – Moon River; Lee Se-young – Motel California | **Undercover High School**; Moon River; Motel California; Oh My Ghost Clients |
| Top Excellence Award, Actor in a Miniseries | Top Excellence Award, Actress in a Miniseries |
| **Kang Tae-oh** – **Moon River**; Jung Kyung-ho – Oh My Ghost Clients; Lee Min-ki – Mary Kills People; Seo Kang-joon – Undercover High School | **Jin Ki-joo** – **Undercover High School**; **Kim Se-jeong** – **Moon River**; Lee Bo-young – Mary Kills People; Lee Se-young – Motel California |
| Top Excellence Award, Actor in a Daily/Short Drama | Top Excellence Award, Actress in a Daily/Short Drama |
| **Song Chang-eui** – **Desperate Mrs. Seonju**; Park Sung-woong – A Head Coach's Turnover; Seo Ha-joon – The Woman Who Swallowed the Sun | **Jang Shin-young** – **The Woman Who Swallowed the Sun**; Choi Jung-yoon – Desperate Mrs. Seonju; Shim Yi-young – Desperate Mrs. Seonju |
| Best Actor Award | Best Actress Award |
| **Jung Kyung-ho** – **Oh My Ghost Clients** | **Lee Se-young** – **Motel California** |
| Excellence Award, Actor in a Miniseries | Excellence Award, Actress in a Miniseries |
| **Na In-woo** – **Motel California**; Cha Hak-yeon – Oh My Ghost Clients; Jin Goo – Moon River; Kim Young-dae – To the Moon | **Lee Sun-bin** – **To the Moon**; Ra Mi-ran – To the Moon; Roh Jeong-eui – Crushology 101; Seol In-ah – Oh My Ghost Clients |
| Excellence Award, Actor in a Daily/Short Drama | Excellence Award, Actress in a Daily/Short Drama |
| **Oh Chang-seok** – **The Woman Who Swallowed the Sun** | **Yoon A-jung** – **The Woman Who Swallowed the Sun** |
| Best Supporting Actor | Best Supporting Actress |
| **Kim Nam-hee – Moon River**; Baek Hyun-jin – Mary Kills People; Eum Moon-suk – To the Moon; Jeon Bae-soo – Undercover High School | **Kim Shin-rok – Undercover High School**; Park Ah-in – Moon River; Woo Mi-hwa – Motel California; Yoon Ga-i – Undercover High School, Mary Kills People; Jun Gook-hyang – Oh My Ghost Clients |
| Best New Actor | Best New Actress |
| **Lee Chae-min – Crushology 101**; **Lee Shin-young – Moon River**; Cho Jun-young – Crushology 101; Shin Jun-hang – Undercover High School | **Jo Aram – To the Moon**; **Hong Su-zu – Moon River**; Choi Hee-jin – Motel California; Hong Seung-hee – To the Moon |
| Best Character Award | Best Couple Award |
| **Jin Goo** – **Moon River** | **Kang Tae-oh and Kim Se-jeong** – **Moon River**; Lee Se-young and Na In-woo – Motel California; Seo Kang-joon and Jin Ki-joo – Undercover High School; Roh Jeong-eui and Lee Chae-min – Crushology 101; Lee Sun-bin and Kim Young-dae – To the Moon |
Lifetime Award
**Lee Soon-jae** (Posthumous award)

== Presenters ==
On December 22, the names of the award presenters were announced as follows:

- Lee Sung-kyung
- Chae Jong-hyeop
- IU
- Byeon Woo-seok
- Shin Ha-kyun
- Heo Sung-tae

== See also ==
- 2025 SBS Drama Awards
- 2025 KBS Drama Awards
