= Kim So-hye =

South Korean actress (born 1999)

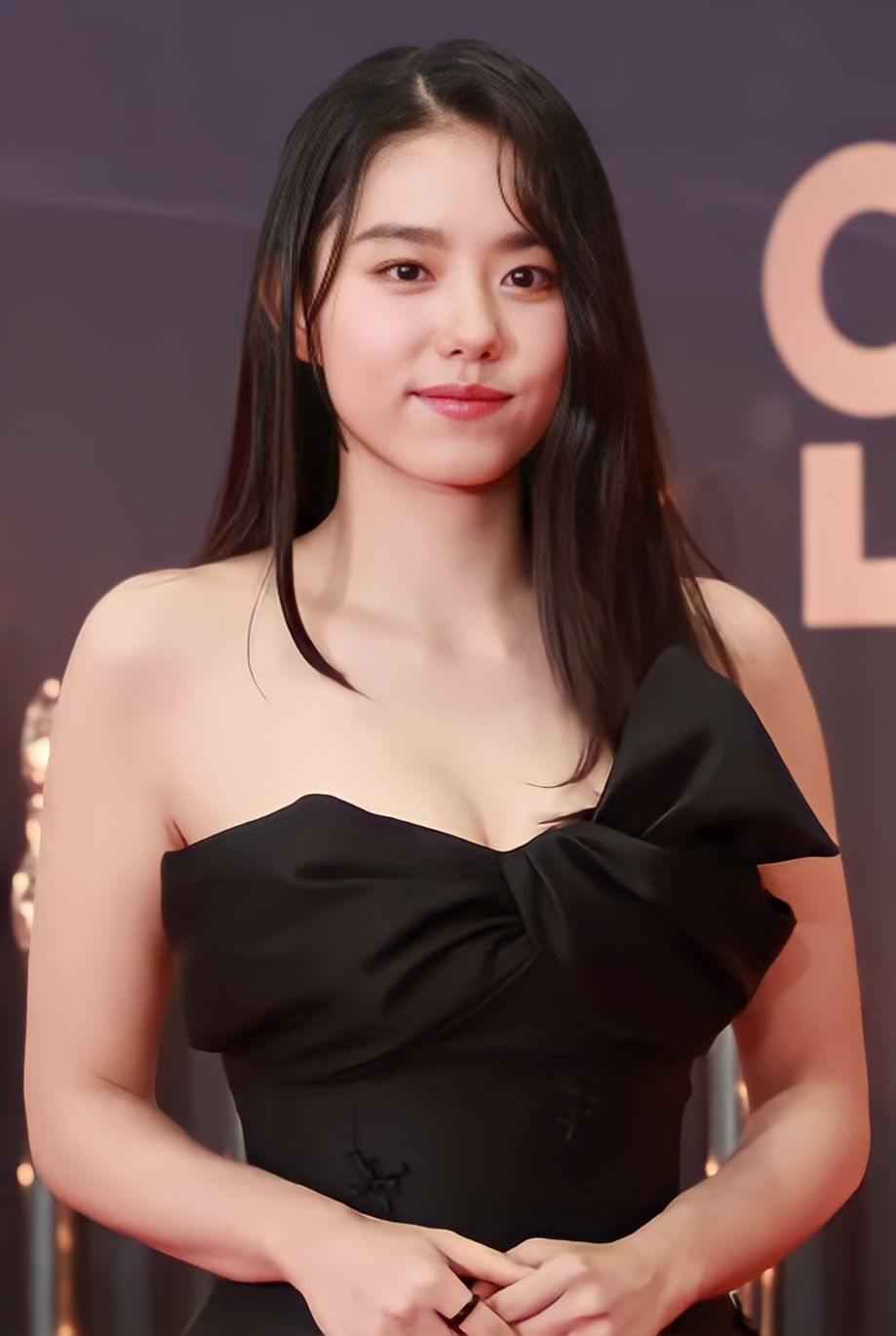
- Kim at the KBS Drama Awards in December 2023
- Born: July 19, 1999 (age 26); Seoul, South Korea
- Education: Sejong University – Film and Arts Department
- Occupations: Actress; singer; businesswoman
- Years active: 2015–present
- Organization(s): S&P Entertainment
- Agent: Noon Company
- Awards: Full list
- Musical career
- Genres: K-pop
- Instrument: Vocals
- Years active: 2016–present
- Labels: RedLine; YMC (Note: As a member of I.O.I only.); Swing; Studio Blu
- Formerly of: I.O.I; I.O.I sub-unit

Korean name
- Hangul: 김소혜
- Hanja: 金素慧
- RR: Gim Sohye
- MR: Kim Sohye

Kim So-hye (Korean: 김소혜; born July 19, 1999), known mononymously as Sohye, is a South Korean actress and singer under S&P Entertainment. She is a former member of the girl musical group I.O.I, finishing fifth on Mnet's survival show Produce 101. She is best known on her acting roles in Poetry Story (2017), Kang Deok-soon's Love History (2017), Best Chicken (2019), and My Lovely Boxer (2023).

== Early life and education ==
Born in Seoul, Kim So-hye was a volleyball player in junior high, and won the National Junior High title as a libero. Kim graduated from the Gyeonggi Girls' High School. Kim is currently attending Sejong University for a degree in Film and Arts Major.

== Career ==
=== 2016: Produce 101 and I.O.I ===
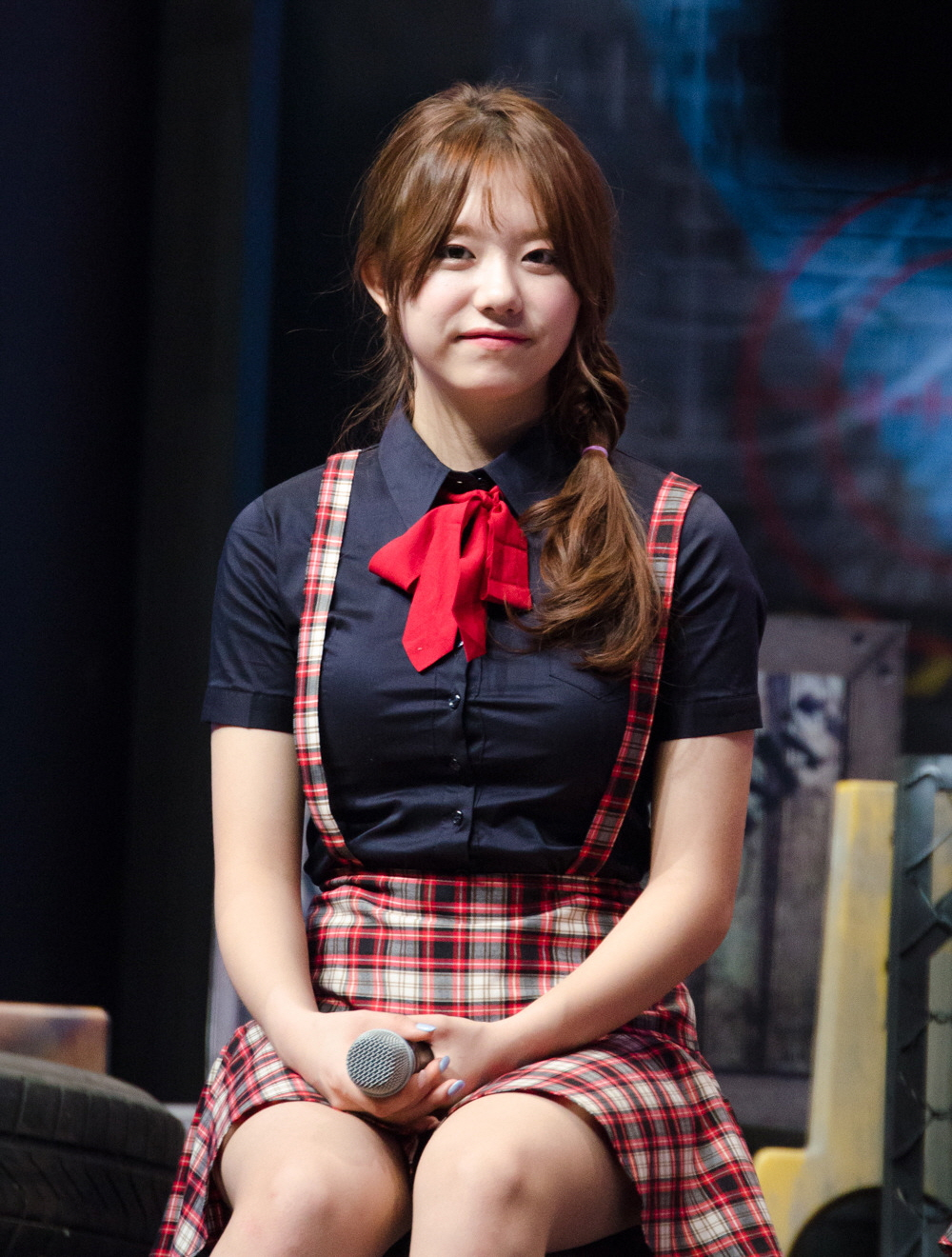
Kim in 2016

Coming from an acting production company, Kim was training to become an actress and had no experience in singing and dancing before joining Produce 101. She finished in fifth place out of the 101 girls competing and became a member of I.O.I. Her company, Redline Entertainment, maintained that she would continue her acting training once she finished promoting with the group.

Aside from participating in activities as part of I.O.I, Kim was a regular host on MBC Every1's Star Show 360 and SBS' Game Show.

=== 2017–present: Acting activities ===
In 2017, Kim made her acting debut in the web drama Poetry Story. The same year, she was cast as the female lead in her first television drama, Kang Deok-soon's Love History.

In 2018, Kim was cast in the youth drama Best Chicken as the female lead.

In 2019, Kim was confirmed to make her big-screen debut in the melodrama film Moonlit Winter. Film critic, film magazine expert, and reporter named her as one of 7 Best Korean Actress 2019, and Moonlit Winter as one of the Best Korean Movie of 2019 (alongside with Gong Hyo-jin and Park Ji-hoo). Kim was featured in Olltii's "Press Start" for his album 8BEAT released on September 9, 2019. Kim starred in the KBS romance drama How to Buy a Friend alongside Lee Shin-young in 2020.

On May 4, 2021, Kim and the members of I.O.I celebrated their 5th debut anniversary with a reunion live stream show called "Yes, I Love It!".

In August 2024, Kim signed with new agency Noon Company.

== Other ventures ==
In June 2016, Kim created her own agency, S&P (Shark & Penguin) Entertainment. She also opened a coffee shop, Penguin's Café, in Seocho District to provide a space where she and her agency could connect with her fans.

== Discography ==
=== Singles ===
Title	Year	Peak chart position	Sales	Album
Title	Year	Gaon	Sales	Album
As featured artist
"Press Start" (Olltii feat. Kim Sohye)	2019	—	—N/a	8BEAT
Soundtrack appearances
"In My Hands: Orlaya Theme"	2021	—	—N/a	Idle Princess OST Part 1
"Close To You"	2021	—	—N/a	Her Bucket List OST Part 2
"—" denotes releases that did not chart or were not released in that region.

== Filmography ==
=== Film ===
Year	Title	Role	Notes	Ref.
2019	Moonlit Winter	Sae-bom		
2019	Bank of Seoul	Ji Hyun-soo	Short film	
2021	Guimoon: The Lightless Door	Hye-young		
2021	Her Bucket List	Cha Ra-ri	Kakao Film	

=== Television series ===
Year	Title	Role	Notes	Ref.
2017	Queen of the Ring	Park Se-gun's ex-girlfriend	Cameo (Episode 1)	
2017	KBS Drama Special – "Kang Deok-soon's Love History"	Kang Deok-soon	One act-drama	
2019	Best Chicken	Seo Bo-ah		
2019	Hello, Today	Jung Si-woo	Television film	
2020	How to Buy a Friend	Uhm Se-yoon		
2020	Strange School Tales: The Child Who Would Not Come	Jung Soo-ah		
2023	My Lovely Boxer	Lee Kwon-suk		
2024	O'PENing 2024 – "Our Beautiful Summer"	Na-ra	Cameo	

=== Web series ===
Year	Title	Role	Notes	Ref.
2015	The Flatterer	High school student	Cameo	
2017	Poetry Story	Lee Ah-chim (Morning)		
2017	Unexpected Heroes	Lee Yoon-ji		
2018	Society Obsessed with Love	Han Sa-rang		
2018	Ambergris	Han Seul		
2021	Ask Ms Shin	Ms Shin		

=== Television shows ===
Year	Title	Role	Notes	Ref.
2016	Star Show 360	Regular host		
2016	Produce 101	Contestant	Survival show that determined I.O.I members Finished 5th	
2016–2018	Game Show Yoo Hee Nak Rak	Regular host		
2017	English Lecture Program	MC		
2017	Follow Me 8S	MC		
2019	Wanna Play? GG	Cast member		
2019	A Man Who Feeds The Dog	Cast member	Season 4	
2019	Go Together Travel Alone	Cast member		
2020	Fly Shoot Dori — New Beginning	Coach		

== Theater ==
Year	Title		Role	Notes	Ref.
Year	English	Korean	Role	Notes	Ref.
2022	Over There	저기요..	Lee Chae In	Theatrical debut	

== Awards and nominations ==
Name of the award ceremony, year presented, category, nominee of the award, and the result of the nomination
Award ceremony	Year	Category	Nominee / Work	Result	Ref.
Asia Model Awards	2019	New Star Award (Actress)	Best Chicken	Won	
Baeksang Arts Awards	2020	Best New Actress – Film	Moonlit Winter	Nominated	
Blue Dragon Film Awards	2021 (Note: Delayed until 2021 due to COVID-19.)	Best New Actress	Moonlit Winter	Nominated	
Buil Film Awards	2020	Best New Actress	Moonlit Winter	Nominated	
Busan Film Critics Awards	2020	Best New Actress	Moonlit Winter	Won	
Chunsa Film Art Awards	2020	Best New Actress	Moonlit Winter	Nominated	
Director's Cut Awards	2022	Best New Actress in Film	Moonlit Winter	Nominated	
Golden Cinema Film Festival	2021	Best New Actress	Moonlit Winter	Won	
KBS Drama Awards	2017	Best Actress in a One-Act/Special/Short Drama	Drama Special: Kang Deok-soon's Love History	Nominated	
KBS Drama Awards	2020	Best New Actress	How to Buy a Friend	Nominated	
