= Guimoon: The Lightless Door =

2021 South Korean horror film

- Official release poster
- Hangul: 귀문
- RR: Gwimun
- MR: Kwimun
- Directed by: Sim Deok-Geun
- Produced by: Joo Seong-ho
- Starring: Kim Kang-woo; Kim So-hye; Lee Jung-hyung
- Cinematography: Yoon Jong-ho
- Production companies: Jupiter Film; Ghost Pictures Co., Ltd.
- Distributed by: CJ Entertainment
- Release date: August 25, 2021
- Running time: 85 minutes
- Country: South Korea
- Language: Korean
- Box office: est. US$676,659

Guimoon: The Lightless Door (Korean: 귀문) is a 2021 South Korean horror film, directed by Sim Deok-Geun and starring Kim Kang-woo, Kim So-hye and Lee Jung-hyung. The film is simultaneously produced in 2D, ScreenX and 4DX versions. This is a first time in any Korean film that audience can feel the horror of the characters with screens extended to both walls, and 4DX equipped with motion chairs and special environmental equipment. The film depicts the story of the director of a psychic research institute and college students. It was released in theatres in 2D, ScreenX, and 4DX on August 25, 2021.

== Synopsis ==
The film depicts a bizarre horror situation in an abandoned training center in Guisari. A building manager in 1990 murdered some guests then committed suicide. It became an annual happening, then the training center was closed. It became a ghost house as rumours begin to circulate.

Do-jin (Kim Kang-woo), the director of the Psychic Research Institute, in an attempt to unveil the secrets of his mother's death enter the training centre. Three college students Hye-young (Kim So-hye), Tae-hoon, and Won-jae also enter the training center to shoot a video for competition. And they meet a chilling horror situation as they open the lightless door.

== Cast ==
- Kim Kang-woo as Do-jin, director of the Psychic Research Institute
- Kim So-hye as Hye-young, leader of college students
- Lee Jung-hyung as Tae-hoon, a college student who became a reporter for a horror video contest
- Hong Jin-ki as Won-jae
- Jang Jae-ho as Kim Seok-ho

== Production ==
The film was shot in an abandoned building in Pocheon to bring out horror in the film.

== Release ==
The film was released on August 25, 2021 on 692 screens in usual 2D version as well as 4DX format (it moves the actual seats according to the movie scene and creates various environmental effects such as wind, light, and fragrance), and Screen X (it uses three sides as screens, not only the front, but also the left and right walls).

== Reception ==
As per the Korean Film Promotion Council (Kofic), the film ranks 4th on the Korean box office on the first day of its release.

As of December 12, 2021, it grossed US$676,659 from 93,657 admissions.
