= Oh Hee-joon =

South Korean actor

- Born: February 25, 1988 (age 38); Cheongju-si, South Korea
- Other names: O Hui-jun, Oh Hee-jun
- Education: Jungbu University (Department of Theater and Film)
- Occupation: Actor
- Years active: 2005–present
- Agent: Management District
- Known for: How to Buy a Friend; 365: Repeat the Year; All of Us Are Dead

Korean name
- Hangul: 오희준
- RR: O Huijun
- MR: O Hŭijun

Oh Hee-joon (Korean: 오희준) is a South Korean actor. He is known for his roles in dramas such as Gangnam Beauty, How to Buy a Friend, 365: Repeat the Year, Cheese in the Trap and All of Us Are Dead. He also appeared in movies The Accidental Detective 2: In Action, The Gangster, the Cop, the Devil, Vanishing Time: A Boy Who Returned and My Brilliant Life.

== Filmography ==
=== Television series ===
Year	Title	Role	Ref.
2009	You're Beautiful	Ko Mi-nam	
2011	High Kick: Revenge of the Short Legged	Han Gyeo-re	
2011	Protect the Boss	Office worker	
2011	Living in Style	Sa Daek-yook	
2011	Vampire Prosecutor	Lee Seung-hak	
2011	Heaven's Garden	Hyun Nam-sub	
2011	Vampire Idol	Kwang-hee's manager	
2011	Special Affairs Team TEN	Young cop	
2012	I Need a Fairy	Park Chang-soo	
2012	The Innocent Man	Han Jae-shik	
2012	Drama Special Series: "Just an Ordinary Love Story"	Assistant boy	
2013	Don't Look Back: The Legend of Orpheus	Kim Dong-soo	
2013	Who Are You?	Seung-ha	
2013	Case Number 113	Kim Kyung-deuk	
2013	Drama Special Series: "Puberty Medley"	Bully	
2014	Cheo Yong	Ghost hunter cameraman	
2014	Plus Nine Boys	Nam Chang-hee	
2014	More Than a Maid	Hui-ju	
2015	Unkind Ladies	Instructor Kim	
2015	Who Are You: School 2015	Food delivery man	
2015	Oh My Ghost	Dormitory occupant	
2015	Reply 1988	Soccer Teammate	
2016	Cheese in the Trap	Ha Jae-woo	
2016	The Vampire Detective	Yoo Goo-hyung	
2016	As if This is Your First Love	Oh Man-su	
2016	KBS Drama Special: "Disqualify Laughter"	Newcomer at National Weather Service	
2016	Wanted	Pierrot	
2016	W	Motel receptionist	
2017	Man to Man	Yang Sang-shik	
2017	Last Minute Romance	Yang-cha	
2018	My Strange Hero	Kim Jae-yoon	
2018	Gangnam Beauty	Kim Chan-woo	
2018	Something in the Rain	Joon-hee's friend	
2018	Are You Human?	Jo In-tae	
2019	Welcome to Waikiki 2	Pervert	
2019	Rookie Historian Goo Hae-ryung	Ahn Hong-ik	
2019	Catch the Ghost	Serial pervert	
2020	365: Repeat the Year	Goo Seung-min	
2020	How to Buy a Friend	Oh Gyung-pyo	
2020	Was It Love?	Do Gwang-soo	
2020	More Than Friends	Min Sang-shik	
2021	Imitation	Koo Dae-kwon	
2022	Through the Darkness	Kang Yoo-min	
2022	All of Us Are Dead	Son Myung-hwan	
2022	Green Mothers' Club	Detective Dong-shik	
2023	Our Blooming Youth	Kim naegwan (Crown Prince's eunuch)	
2023	Moving	Song Gi-yul	
2024	Flex X Cop	O Byeon-su	
2024	Red Swan	Hwang Se-joon	
2024	The Auditors	Moon Sang-ha	
2024	Good Partner	Jung Jin-ho	
2024	Light Shop	Detective Song	

=== Film ===
Year	Title		Role
Year	English	Korean	Role
2005	Antarctic Journal	남극일기	Person
2011	Glove	글러브	Bully
2011	In Love and War	적과의 동침	Machine gun soldier
2011	Punch	완득이	Wan Deuk group student
2011	S.I.U.	특수본	Messenger
2011	Stateless Things	줄탁동시	Delivery man
2012	Mirage	밀월도 가는 길	Jong-hyeok's group
2012	Almost Che	강철대오: 구국의 철가방	Riot police
2012	Love Clinique	음치 클리닉	Senior
2013	The Gifted Hands	사이코메트리	Poor student
2013	South Bound	남쪽으로 튀어	Internet cafe member
2013	Neverdie Butterfly	네버다이 버터플라이	Min-shik's group member
2013	Steel Cold Winter	소녀	Hyung-joon
2013	Ingtoogi: The Battle of Internet Trolls	잉투기	Woo-jin
2014	Han Gong-ju	한공주	Min-ho's gang
2014	Obsessed	인간중독	Soldier on duty
2014	18 - Eighteen Noir	18 : 우리들의 성장 느와르	Bucheon High School student
2014	My Brilliant Life	두근두근 내 인생	Mi-ra's older brother
2015	Socialphobia	소셜포비아	Soldier
2015	Fatal Intuition	그놈이다	High school student
2016	Two Rooms, Two Nights	두 개의 연애	Servant's quarters man
2016	Canola	계춘할망	Gye-choon's house member
2016	Vanishing Time: A Boy Who Returned	가려진 시간	Search police
2017	Baby Beside Me	아기와 나	Jung-ok
2017	The Chase	반드시 잡는다	Gangster
2017	Along with the Gods: The Two Worlds	신과함께: 죄와 벌	Interpreter soldier
2018	Never Ever Rush	너는 결코 서둘지 말라	Chul-woong
2018	The Accidental Detective 2: In Action	탐정: 리턴즈	Kim Jae-min
2018	Along with the Gods: The Last 49 Days	신과함께-인과 연	Translator soldier of Goryeo
2018	Ordinary People	동네사람들; 곰탱이	Kim Dong-soo
2019
2019	Mal-Mo-E: The Secret Mission	말모이	Mail man
2019	Scent of a Ghost	귀신의 향기	High school student
2019	Exit	엑시트	Older brother
2019	Money	돈	Stock company unemployed man
2019	Maggie	메기	Mummy
2019	The Gangster, the Cop, the Devil	악인전	Kim Dong-chul
2019	Jo Pil-ho: The Dawning Rage	악질경찰	Drug addict
2019	Forbidden Dream	천문: 하늘에 묻는다	Young eunuch
2020	Diva	디바	Reporter at Hospital
2022	Broker	브로커	Detective Choi's subordinate
2022	Men of Plastic	압꾸정	Valet
2023	Concrete Utopia	콘크리트 유토피아	Homeless man

== Awards and nominations ==
Year	Award	Category	Result	Ref.
2017	Mise-en-scène Short Film Festival Awards	Special Jury Prize for Acting	Won	
2018	Great Short Film Festival Awards	Great Actor Award	Won	
