= My Lovely Boxer =

2023 South Korean television series

- Promotional poster
- Hangul: 순정복서
- Lit.: Pure Boxer
- RR: Sunjeongbokseo
- MR: Sunjŏngboksŏ
- Genre: Sports drama; Romance
- Based on: Pure Boxer by Chu Jong-nam
- Written by: Kim Min-joo
- Directed by: Choi Sang-yeol; Hong Eun-mi
- Starring: Lee Sang-yeob; Kim So-hye; Park Ji-hwan; Kim Hyung-mook; Kim Jin-woo; Ha Seung-ri; Chae Won-bin
- Music by: Kenzie; Lee Na-il
- Country of origin: South Korea
- Original language: Korean
- No. of episodes: 12

Production
- Executive producer: Lee Jung-mi (KBS)
- Producers: Kim Chang-min; Oh Hyung-il
- Running time: 70 minutes
- Production companies: Acemaker Movieworks; Cornerstone; Hello I Am Newtopia

Original release
- Network: KBS2
- Release: August 21 – October 2, 2023

My Lovely Boxer (Korean: 순정복서) is a 2023 South Korean television series starring Lee Sang-yeob, Kim So-hye, Park Ji-hwan, Kim Hyung-mook, Kim Jin-woo, Ha Seung-ri, and Chae Won-bin. It premiered on KBS2 on August 21, 2023, and aired every Monday and Tuesday at 21:45 (KST).

== Synopsis ==
The series follows the story of a female boxing star who disappeared three years ago to live a new life and faces a new turning point in life upon meeting a cold-blooded agent who treats sports success and athletes with match-fixing for money.

== Cast ==
=== Main ===
- Lee Sang-yeob as Kim Tae-young: an S&P Sports Agent who attracts talented players and retires them in a short period of time.
- Kim So-hye as Lee Kwon-sook: a genius boxer who emerged as a boxing star at the age of 17.
- Park Ji-hwan as Kim Oh-bok: a professional match-fixer.
- Kim Hyung-mook as Lee Chul-yong: Kwon-sook's father who is a former WBA lightweight champion.
- Kim Jin-woo as Han Jae-min: Kwon-sook's first love.
- Ha Seung-ri as Jeong Su-yeon: About Sports's team leader.
- Chae Won-bin as Han Ah-reum: Korea's best bantamweight boxing champion who has won the world's top 3 championships.

=== Supporting ===
==== Tae-young's athletes ====
- Choi Jae-woong as Kim Hee-won: Tae-young's long-time athlete who was closer than his own brother.
- Kim Hee-chan as Choi Ho-joong: Tae-young's junior and Kwon-sook's training partner who is a former WBO lightweight champion.

==== S&P people ====
- Yoon In-jo as Lee Young-ae
- Kim Sang-woo as Go Seon-jae: a junior employee at S&P Sports Agent.

==== People in Boxing ====
- Sung No-jin as Trainer Song: The best trainer in Korea who discovered Ah-reum and raised her to become a world champion.
- Lim Young-joo as Park Hyejin: a senior boxer who gets along with Ah-reum like sister.
- Han Da-sol as Jo A-ra: Kwon-sook's opponent.

==== Kindergarten People ====
- Song Ye-bin as Eun-sol: a teacher of Hanok Kindergarten.
- Kim Seon-ki as senior teacher: a teacher of Hanok Kindergarten.
- Lee Song-yi as junior teacher: a teacher of Hanok Kindergarten.

==== Sports Industry Figures ====
- Kim Sang-bo as Park Kyung-soo: a star reporter for a sports magazine.
- Nam Tae-woo as Yang Man-hee: Hee-won's manager of HH Cheetahs.

==== Others ====
- Moon Jung-hee as Min Kyung-ok: Tae-young's mother.
- Shin Seo-woo as Ye-jun: Hee-won's daughter.
- Lee Eun-jo as Ye-jun's mother: Hee-won's wife.

== Ratings ==
Average TV viewership ratings (nationwide)
Ep.	Original broadcast date	Average audience share (Nielsen Korea)
1	August 21, 2023	2.0% (31st)
2	August 22, 2023	1.8% (30th)
3	August 28, 2023	1.8% (33rd)
4	August 29, 2023	1.6% (36th)
5	September 4, 2023	1.4% (39th)
6	September 5, 2023	1.4% (36th)
7	September 11, 2023	1.1% (42nd)
8	September 12, 2023	1.1% (41st)
9	September 18, 2023	1.5% (38th)
10	September 25, 2023	0.9% (38th)
11	September 26, 2023	0.9% (44th)
12	October 2, 2023	2.2% (26th)
Average		1.5%
In the table above, the blue numbers represent the lowest ratings and the red numbers represent the highest ratings.
