= Best Chicken =

2019 South Korean television series

- Promotional poster
- Hangul: 최고의 치킨
- RR: Choegoui chikin
- MR: Ch'oegoŭi ch'ik'in
- Genre: Romantic comedy
- Written by: Jo Ah-young; Park Chan-young
- Directed by: Lee Seung-hoon
- Starring: Park Sun-ho; Kim So-hye; Joo Woo-jae
- Country of origin: South Korea
- Original language: Korean
- No. of episodes: 12

Production
- Camera setup: Single-camera
- Production companies: iHQ; May Queen Pictures

Original release
- Network: MBN; Dramax
- Release: January 2 – February 7, 2019

Best Chicken (Korean: 최고의 치킨; RR: Choegoui chikin) is a 2019 South Korean television series starring Park Sun-ho, Kim So-hye and Joo Woo-jae. It aired on MBN and Dramax from January 2 to February 7, 2019, every Wednesday and Thursday at 23:00 (KST).

== Plot ==
Park Choi-go quits from his office table job to open a chicken restaurant in a middle-income neighborhood of Seoul. Renting a plot of land where a sauna stands from the landlord, Seo Myung-dong, he has to face Myung-dong's temperamental granddaughter and the sauna's owner, Bo-ah. For the past five years, Bo-ah, a failing webtoon artist, has been holing up in the sauna after a conflict with a popular webtoon artist over ownership rights led to her being shunned from the community. Myung-dong asks Choi-go to admit Bo-ah as a part-timer in his restaurant in exchange for a lower rent fee, hoping that she can regain her spirit.

Bo-ah is hostile at Choi-go for disturbing her peace and regards him as simply a rich bourgeoisie who wanted to experience the life of a commoner. Helped by her childhood friends: Hwang Min-ah, Oh Yeong-ho, and Kim Kyu-man, they try to sabotage the joint through various means, such as handing out scathing flyers, which backfires when it turns viral and therefore garners attention. However, Choi-go's seriousness at his job and unfailing kindness to Bo-ah cause her to begin questioning her first impression. Since Choi-go never studied cooking, the restaurant operates at a loss until he hires Andrew Kang, a bum with a tremor who used to work at a three-star Michelin restaurant.

Around the time when Bo-ah softens and falls in love with Choi-go, two adversaries come into the scene. The first is Choi-go's ex-girlfriend, Moon So-dam, who works at a food TV program and wants to reconnect with Choi-go by doing a free publicity of the joint. During the broadcast, Min-ah, Yeong-ho, and Kyu-man successfully do a sabotage, causing its suspension for two months. So-dam becomes suspicious of Bo-ah, who did not participate in the plan, tries to warn Choi-go, who refuses to believe her, and attempts to catch the trio off-guard when they try another sabotage. However, Andrew bails them at the last minute and makes them promise not to do it again. The second adversary is Choi-go's domineering mother, So Oh-sook, who is angry at him for quitting his previous job and attempts to reduce his chance of winning big by opening a chicken joint down the street after tricking Bo-ah into giving her his recipe.

Feeling guilty, Bo-ah admits her previous actions to Choi-go and considers resigning. While upset, Choi-go comes to realize that he has grown to love her and confesses, begging her to stay. Min-ah, Yeong-ho, and Kyu-man are initially livid at Bo-ah for not telling them to stop harassing Choi-go sooner, but quickly make amends when a tragedy strikes her: the death of Myung-dong. During the funeral, Bo-ah's deadbeat father, Gong-cheol suddenly appears to take his legal inheritance, despite the fact that his father had left all his possessions to Bo-ah, and redevelop the neighborhood, which would raze the chicken joint to the ground. Assisted by her friends, Bo-ah manages to convince the neighborhood not to sell their land.

Several months later, Choi-go's chicken joint is growing popular. Oh-sook chooses to stop bothering Choi-go and sell her joint. So-dam has moved on and is dating Choi-go's brother, Joon-hyuk, with whom she grew closer while investigating Bo-ah and her friends. Thinking that he has nothing more to offer to Choi-go, Andrew resigns and opens a restaurant nearby. Bo-ah, meanwhile, finally decides to draw webtoon again, having made a promise to Myung-dong to live her life to the fullest.

== Cast ==
=== Main ===
- Park Sun-ho as Park Choi-go (28 years old)

An employee of a large corporation who quits his job to open his own chicken restaurant, which he considers a dream project. He is a very optimistic and idealistic man, sometimes outrageously so.

- Kim So-hye as Seo Bo-ah (25 years old)

The owner of a public bathhouse that her grandfather rented out without her consent who dreams of becoming a webtoon artist. She has a negative view of the world after her work was rejected five years ago because of a feud with another webtoon artist, regarding everyone new to her as a nuisance.

- Joo Woo-jae as Andrew Kang (33 years old)

A once promising chef who is currently homeless. A serious person at all times, Andrew has a bad case of tremor which discourages him from doing physical work for a long time. A running gag in the series is characters mispronouncing his Western name, such as Edward or Alexander.

=== Supporting ===
- Lee Seung-hyub as Park Joon-hyuk

Choi-go's older brother who is an Oriental Medicine doctor. He excels in academic studies, but is bad at table waiting, as the chicken joint find out when he substitutes for Bo-ah while she is on vacation.

- Son Min-ji as Hwang Min-ah

Bo-ah's friend who is smart and does all the planning. She works as a secretary at the neighborhood's real estate firm.

- Jeon Seong-hwan as Oh Yeong-ho

Bo-ah's friend who likes to fool around. He runs the neighborhood grocery store.

- Yoo Moon-chi as Kim Kyu-man

Bo-ah's friend who runs the neighborhood butcher shop. He has an identical younger cousin who is still a high school student.

- Myung Kye-nam as Seo Myung-dong

Bo-ah's paternal grandfather and the landlord of the neighborhood. Though appearing grumpy, he is very caring to Bo-ah, having raised her by himself since young after her mother died and her father left.

- Hong Soon-chang as the real estate manager and Min-ah's grandfather.
- Ahn Young-chae as Kwon-hyuk

A legendarily fast delivery man from the neighborhood who speaks very little. Near the end of the series, he is hired by Choi-go to become the chicken joint's delivery man.

- Na In-woo as Lee Jin-sang

A popular webtoon artist whose feud with Bo-ah over ownership rights led to her being excluded from the community.

- Sora Jung as So Oh-sook

Choi-go's and Joon-hyuk's overbearing mother and a retired restaurant manager. When her husband was unable to find a job, she became the family's sole breadwinner, which the brothers speak of positively, but it also caused her to develop a view that only she knows what is best for them.

- Ah Young as Moon So-dam

Choi-go's ex-girlfriend who works at a TV station specializing in food programs.

- Hongseok as Bae Ki-bum

A part-timer at Choi-go's restaurant. He is hired by the chicken joint as additional manpower when So-dam's TV crew is about to shoot.

- Choi Sung-kook as Seo Gong-cheol

Bo-ah's father. He abandoned the family when she was young and only reappears in her life after Myung-dong's death.

== Production ==
Filming began in September 2018.

== Original soundtrack ==
Best Chicken OST

Soundtrack album by Various artists
- Recorded: 2018
- Genre: Soundtrack
- Languages: Korean; English
- Labels: Warner Music, Forest Media

=== Part 1 ===
Released on January 2, 2019
| No. | Title | Lyrics | Music | Artist | Length |
|---|---|---|---|---|---|
| 1. | "Sweet Stranger" | Kim Yoo-kyung | Oh Joon-sung | Kim Eun-bi (EB) | 3:28 |
| 2. | "Sweet Stranger" (Inst.) | | Oh Joon-sung | | 3:28 |
| Total length: | | | | | 6:56 |

=== Part 2 ===
Released on January 9, 2019
| No. | Title | Lyrics | Music | Artist | Length |
|---|---|---|---|---|---|
| 1. | "Dr. Dream" | Kim Jin-ah | Oh Joon-sung | Sohee (Elris) | 4:04 |
| 2. | "Dr. Dream" (Inst.) | | Oh Joon-sung | | 4:04 |
| Total length: | | | | | 8:08 |

=== Part 3 ===
Released on January 10, 2019
| No. | Title | Lyrics | Music | Artist | Length |
|---|---|---|---|---|---|
| 1. | "Chicken Song" (치킨송) | Oh Joon-sung | Oh Joon-sung | Chick Choir | 2:35 |
| 2. | "Chicken Song" (Inst.) | | Oh Joon-sung | | 2:35 |
| Total length: | | | | | 5:10 |

=== Part 4 ===
Released on January 16, 2019
| No. | Title | Lyrics | Music | Artist | Length |
|---|---|---|---|---|---|
| 1. | "Heaven" | Kim Yoo-kyung | Oh Joon-sung | Seven O'Clock | 3:58 |
| 2. | "Heaven" (Inst.) | | Oh Joon-sung | | 3:58 |
| Total length: | | | | | 7:56 |

=== Part 5 ===
Released on January 17, 2019
| No. | Title | Lyrics | Music | Artist | Length |
|---|---|---|---|---|---|
| 1. | "Lucky" | Oh Joon-sung, Eun Jong-tae | Oh Joon-sung | J. Mee | 4:07 |
| 2. | "Lucky" (Inst.) | | Oh Joon-sung | | 4:07 |
| Total length: | | | | | 8:14 |

== Ratings ==
Average TV viewership ratings (nationwide)
| Ep. | Original broadcast date | Nielsen Korea |
|---|---|---|
| 1 | January 2, 2019 | 1.267% |
| 2 | January 3, 2019 | 0.927% |
| 3 | January 9, 2019 | 1.207% |
| 4 | January 10, 2019 | 0.939% |
| 5 | January 16, 2019 | 0.995% |
| 6 | January 17, 2019 | 0.941% |
| 7 | January 23, 2019 | 1.270% |
| 8 | January 24, 2019 | 0.781% |
| 9 | January 30, 2019 | 1.249% |
| 10 | January 31, 2019 | 0.714% |
| 11 | February 6, 2019 | 1.000% |
| 12 | February 7, 2019 | 0.710% |
| Average | | 1.000% |
In the table above, the blue numbers represent the lowest ratings and the red numbers represent the highest ratings.; This series aired on a cable channel/pay TV which normally has a relatively smaller audience compared to free-to-air TV/public broadcasters (KBS, SBS, MBC and EBS).
