= Ham Sung-min =

South Korean actor

- Born: March 14, 1998 (age 28); South Korea
- Other name: Ham Seong-min
- Education: Bucheon Buheung Middle School
- Occupation: Actor
- Years active: 2005–present
- Agent: Origin Entertainment
- Known for: Sweet Revenge; Gangnam Beauty; All of Us Are Dead

Ham Sung-min is a South Korean actor. He is known for his roles in dramas such as Sweet Revenge, Save the Family, Gangnam Beauty, Tunnel and All of Us Are Dead. He also appeared in movies such as Psychokinesis, The Sound of a Flower, Confession, The Battleship Island and Missing.

== Filmography ==
=== Television series ===
Year	Title	Role	Ref.
2005	Golden Apple	Child	
2008	Aquarius	young child	
2011	Six-fingered Boy	Hyun-jin	
2013	Basketball	Sung-min	
2013	Pure Love	Student	
2013	Don't Look Back: The Legend of Orpheus	Lee-yu	
2013	Golden Rainbow	Jeong-woo	
2015	Unkind Ladies	Student	
2015	Save the Family	Lee Jung-su	
2016	Pied Piper	PC cafe customer	
2016	Nightmare Teacher	Ahn Byung-jin	
2016	Memory	Kwon Myung-soo	
2016	Blow Breeze	Kim Deok-cheon	
2016	Guardian: The Lonely and Great God	North Korean soldier	
2017	Tunnel	Jung Ho-yeong	
2017	Sweet Revenge	Lee Kang-min	
2018	Gangnam Beauty	Jung Dong-won	
2018	Clean with Passion for Now	Action Figure collector	
2019	Voice 3	Pyo Hyun-soo	
2019	Doctor John	Yoon Sung-gyu	
2019	Birthday Letter	Joo Geung-kae	
2019	Love Alarm	Bullied student	
2020	Nobody Knows	Lee Young-shik's friend	
2020	Sweet Home	Park Ju-yeong	
2022	All of Us Are Dead	Han Gyeong-su	
2023	Revenant	Yeom Hae-sang	
2025	Spirit Fingers	Oh Dae-oh	

=== Film ===
Year	Title		Role
Year	English	Korean	Role
2007	Two Faces of My Girlfriend	두 얼굴의 여친	Young boy
2008	The ESP Couple	초감각 커플	Young Su-min
2008	A Frozen Flower	쌍화점	Seong-min
2009	Secret	시크릿	Boy
2013	South Bound	남쪽으로 튀어	Hyuk-yi
2014	Confession	좋은 친구들	Min-soo
2014	Ocean Calls	오션 콜	Joon-seok
2014	End of Deadline	마감일의 끝	Min-soo
2014	The Tunnel	터널 3D	Small boy
2015	The Piper	손님	Dong-chun
2015	The Sound of a Flower	도리화가	Dongrijeong Temple disciple
2016	Great Patrioteers	우리 손자 베스트	Favored grandchild
2016	Missing	미씽: 사라진 여자	Boy in school uniform
2016	Queen of Walking	걷기왕	Class student
2016	Proof of Innocence	특별수사: 사형수의 편지	Jeong-ho
2016	A Melody To Remember	오빠 생각	Jin-wook
2017	The Battleship Island	군함도	Bok-jin's group
2018	Psychokinesis	염력	Small worker
2019	Sunkist Family	썬키스트 패밀리	Kim Chi-gon
