= Tokyo Sun Shower =

- Also known as: Tokyo Shower
- Genre: Romance
- Written by: Kim Jin-hee
- Directed by: Lee Joon-hyung
- Starring: Kim Sa-rang; Kim Tae-woo
- Country of origin: South Korea
- Original language: Korean
- No. of seasons: 1
- No. of episodes: 4

Production
- Running time: Mondays and Tuesdays at 21:55 (KST)

Original release
- Network: Seoul Broadcasting System
- Release: June 2 – June 10, 2008

Tokyo Sun Shower (Korean: 도쿄 여우비; RR: Dokyo yeoubi) is a 2008 South Korean television series starring Kim Sa-rang and Kim Tae-woo. This drama is a joint Korea-Japan production.

== Plot ==
A young actress, Soo-jin, runs away while filming a commercial shoot in Tokyo. She meets and falls in love with Hyun-soo, a sushi chef from Korea living in Japan. Seven years later and now a famous actress, she still cannot forget him.

== Cast ==
- Kim Sa-rang as Lee Soo-jin
- Kim Tae-woo as Jung Hyun-soo
- Jin Goo as Park Sang-gil
- Ivy as Eun-bi
- Erika Okuda as Megumi
- Lee Ki-young as Chun Man-hee
- Ryohei Otani as Yuseuke

== Episode ratings ==
Date	Episode	Nationwide	Seoul
2008-06-02	1	6.3%	(<8.4)
2008-06-03	2	4.0%	(<8.2)
2008-06-09	3	4.8%	(<7.8)
2008-06-10	4	6.8%	(<7.9)
Average		5.5%	-

Source: TNS Media Korea
