= Jin Goo =

South Korean actor

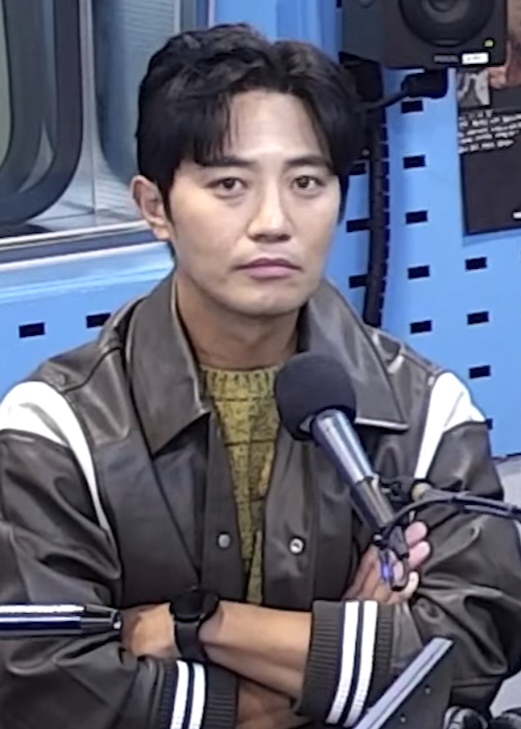
- Jin in October 2022
- Born: July 20, 1980 (age 46); Hwigyeong-dong, Dongdaemun-gu, Seoul, South Korea
- Education: Sahmyook University - Advertising
- Occupation: Actor
- Years active: 2003–present
- Agent: Varo Entertainment
- Spouse: Unknown (m. 2014)
- Children: 2

Korean name
- Hangul: 진구
- Hanja: 晋久
- RR: Jin Gu
- MR: Chin Ku

Jin Goo (Korean: 진구; born July 20, 1980) is a South Korean actor. He won Best Supporting Actor at the Grand Bell Awards and Blue Dragon Film Awards for his role in Bong Joon-ho's 2009 noir thriller Mother. He is also known for his role in the critically and commercially successful series Descendants of the Sun.

== Career ==
=== 2003–2008: Beginnings ===
Jin Goo made his television debut in the 2003 gambling drama All In, as the younger version of the protagonist character played by Lee Byung-hun. They reunited onscreen in Kim Jee-woon's film noir A Bittersweet Life, and Jin would later join Lee when he established his own management agency, BH Entertainment.

In 2005, Jin starred in the one-episode drama Saya, Saya ("Bird, Bird"), adapted from the novel written by Shin Kyung-sook about a mother and son who are both deaf. It won the top award in the TV movie/miniseries category of Prix Italia, and the jury praised it as "a magical, moving and poetic story about the power of love with high quality performances."

After a guest appearance as a Korean language teacher on the webisodes of Japanese drama Joshi Deka!, Jin returned to Korean television in 2008's Spotlight, a glimpse into the lives of broadcast news reporters covering the city beat. To prepare for his role, Jin followed a cub reporter for a day, and realized they didn't have time to bathe or even wash their faces.

Though he appeared in little-seen mystery romance The ESP Couple, Jin would become known for playing strong moody characters, such as a low-ranking thug in Yoo Ha's A Dirty Carnival, and a serial killer in Truck. For his portrayal of a secretive doctor in arthouse horror film Epitaph, Jin received a Best New Actor trophy from the Golden Cinematography Awards.

=== 2009–2015: Breakthrough and continued acting ===
Jin's breakthrough would be his critically acclaimed supporting turn in 2009's Mother. His performance in the Bong Joon-ho thriller earned him recognition from the Grand Bell Awards, the University Film Festival of Korea, and the Blue Dragon Film Awards.

In 2010, Jin shed his hardboiled image to play a down-to-earth, aspiring chef in Le Grand Chef 2: Kimchi Battle. He said the film was a great pleasure to make since cooking is a hobby of his, though emulating a professional chef meant undergoing "200 hours of chopping radishes" in order to perfect the motion. He added that after the filming, he was able to make kimchi with his mother, which proved to be a memorable experience.

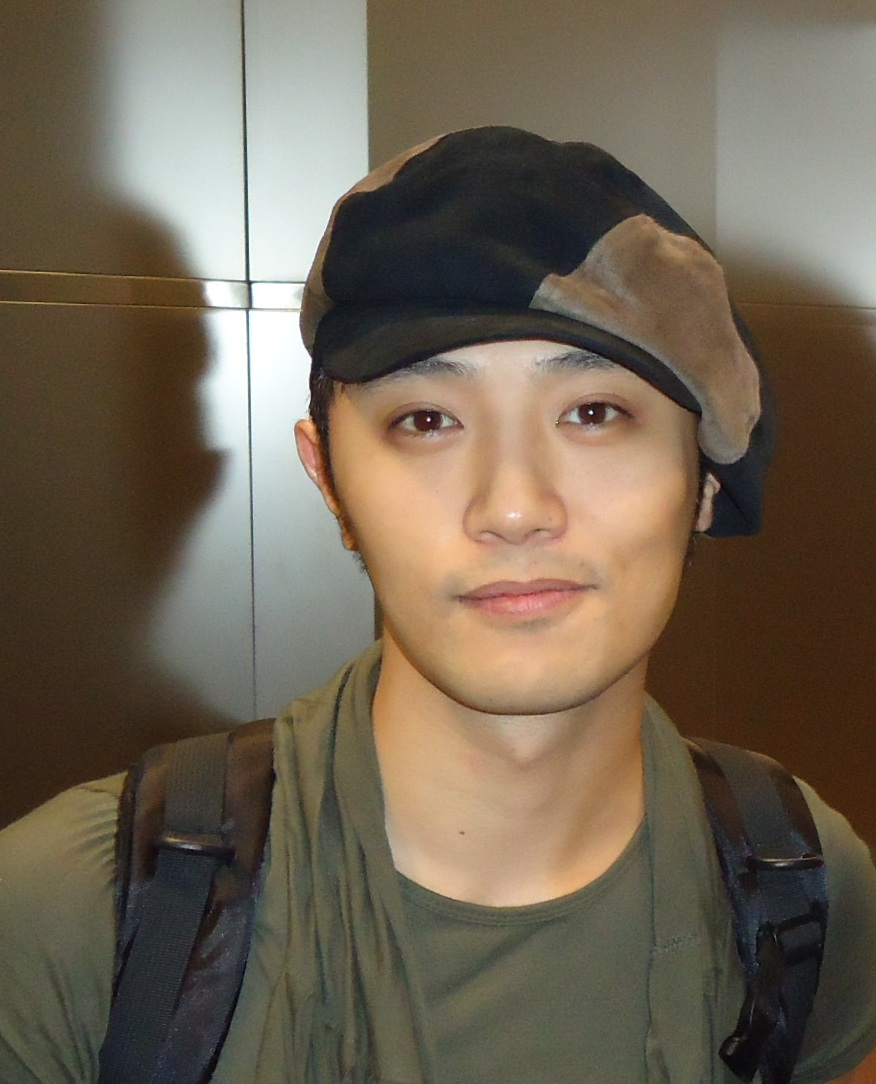
Jin for the Guys and Dolls musical in 2011

2011 was a busy year for Jin. Besides appearing in conspiracy thriller Moby Dick, he had a starring role as one of three desperate Joseon soldiers in The Showdown. He also made his stage debut as Nathan in a Korean production of the musical Guys and Dolls.

He next starred in 26 Years, based on Kang Full's manhwa about a plot to assassinate the man responsible for the Gwangju Massacre. Jin had been attached to the project since pre-production began in 2008, but investors backed out due to the politically controversial content. Online donations from thousands of private individuals enabled filming to resume in 2012. Jin was the only holdover from the original cast; initially cast as the young policeman, he now played the more central role of the gangster.

In 2013, he played the titular character in TV series Ad Genius Lee Tae-baek, a success story about a man who comes up to Seoul from the countryside armed with nothing but a high school diploma and a gift for drawing, and through sheer hard work, fights his way to become the best ad man and art director in the business.

Supporting roles followed in thriller The Target, period blockbuster The Admiral: Roaring Currents, and nostalgic musical drama C'est Si Bon. In 2015, Jin starred in Northern Limit Line, a naval thriller about the Second Battle of Yeonpyeong.

=== 2016–present: Rising popularity ===
2016 was a remarkable year for Jin Goo. He was cast as an elite special forces soldier in Descendants of the Sun, a romantic melodrama written by Kim Eun-sook. The drama was a critical and commercial success in Asia, and led to a surge in popularity for Jin. Later in the year, Jin starred in MBC's melodrama Night Light.

In 2017, Jin starred in the action film One Line, where he played a legendary swindler who joins with a student (Yim Si-wan) to rob a bank. He then starred in JTBC's action melodrama Untouchable.

In 2019, Jin starred in the legal drama Legal High, a remake of the Japanese television series of the same name.

In December 2020, Jin signed with new agency Varo Entertainment.

== Personal life ==
=== Marriage and family ===
Jin married his girlfriend on September 21, 2014. The couple welcomed a baby boy in June 2015. They welcomed their second child, a baby girl, in November 2016.

=== Military service ===
Jin completed his mandatory military service in the Republic of Korea Navy military police.

== Filmography ==
Key
†	Denotes films that have not yet been released

=== Film ===
Year	Title	Role	Notes/Ref.
2003	Romantic Assassins	Assassin	
2003	1+1=6		Short film
2005	A Bittersweet Life	Min-gi	
2006	A Dirty Carnival	Jong-soo	
2006	Ice Bar	In-baek	
2006	Love Me Not	Mickey / Tae-ho	
2007	Epitaph	Park Jung-nam	
2008	Truck	Kim Young-ho	
2008	The ESP Couple	Su-min	
2009	Mother	Jin-tae	
2010	Le Grand Chef 2: Kimchi Battle	Seong-chan	
2011	The Showdown	Do-young	
2011	Moby Dick	Yoon Hyuk	
2011	Always	Pottery store owner	Cameo
2012	26 Years	Kwak Jin-bae	
2014	The Target	Baek Sung-hoon	
2014	The Admiral: Roaring Currents	Lim Jun-young	
2014	Late Spring		cameo
2015	C'est Si Bon	Lee Jang-hee (20s)	
2015	Northern Limit Line	Han Sang-gook	
2017	One Line	Suk-goo	
2018	Heung-boo: The Revolutionist	Nolbu	Special appearance
2021	You're Precious to Me (My Lovely Angel)	Park Jae-shik	
2022	The Witch: Part 2. The Other One	Yong-du	

=== Television series ===
Year	Title	Role	Notes/Ref.
2003	All In	young Kim In-ha	
2004	MBC Best Theater	Jin-ho	Episode "Where Are Arrows We Shoot?"
2004	Nonstop 5	Jin Goo	
2004	MBC Best Theater	Bae Sang-woo	Episode "Oshio Ddeokbokki"
2005	HDTV Literature	Little Brother	Episode "Saya, Saya (Bird, Bird)"
2007	Joshi Deka!	Korean language teacher	guest, episode 10 and webisode
2008	Spotlight	Lee Seon-chul	
2008	Tokyo Sun Shower	Park Sang-gil	
2009	Swallow the Sun	young Kim Il-hwan	Cameo
2010	Athena: Goddess of War	Black agent Jang Hyuk-joon	Cameo, episode 7
2013	Ad Genius Lee Tae-baek	Lee Tae-baek	
2015	Beating Again	Ma Dong-wook	Guest
2016	Descendants of the Sun	Seo Dae-young	
2016	Entourage	Himself	Cameo, episode 4
2016	Night Light	Park Gun-woo	
2017	Untouchable	Jang Joon-seo	
2018	Mr. Sunshine	Go Sang-wan	Cameo
2019	Legal High	Go Tae-rim	
2022	A Superior Day	Lee Ho-cheol	
2022	Shadow Detective	Guk Jin-han	Season 1
2024	The Auditors	Hwang Dae-woong	
2025	Moon River	Kim Han Chul	
2026	The Legend of Kitchen Soldier	Ha Byung-dae	Cameo, episode 5
2026	Reborn Rookie	Kang Jae-sung	

=== Web series ===
Year	Title	Role	Notes	Ref.
2022	The King of the Desert	Chairman		

=== Music video appearances ===
Year	Song title	Artist
2007	"Sonata of Temptation"	Ivy
2009	"Shout to the Heart"	Monday Kiz ft. Rhymer
2009	"Scar"	Monday Kiz
2009	"Stupid"	Yoon Seo-jin
2013	"V"	Lee Jung-hyun

== Musical theatre ==
Year	Title	Role
2011	Guys and Dolls	Nathan Detroit

== Awards and nominations ==
Name of the award ceremony, year presented, nominated work, category and the result of the nomination
Award ceremony	Year	Category	Nominated work	Result	Ref.
APAN Star Awards	2016	Best Supporting Actor	Descendants of the Sun	Won	
APAN Star Awards	2016	Best Couple Award (with Kim Ji-won)	Descendants of the Sun	Nominated	
Asia Artist Awards	2016	Best Celebrity Award, Actor	Descendants of the Sun	Won	
Asia Model Festival	2016	Popular Star Award	Descendants of the Sun	Won	
Baeksang Arts Awards	2007	Best New Actor – Film	A Dirty Carnival	Nominated	
Blue Dragon Film Awards	2006	Best New Actor	A Dirty Carnival	Nominated	
Blue Dragon Film Awards	2009	Best Supporting Actor	Mother	Won	
Buil Film Awards	2013	Best Actor	26 Years	Nominated	
Golden Cinematography Awards	2008	Best New Actor	Epitaph	Won	
Golden Cinematography Awards	2014	Special Jury Prize	26 Years	Won	
Grand Bell Awards	2009	Best Supporting Actor	Mother	Won	
Grand Bell Awards	2015	Best Supporting Actor	C'est Si Bon	Nominated	
Indonesian Television Awards	2016	Special Award	Descendants of the Sun	Won	
KBS Drama Awards	2005	Best Actor in a One-Act / Special / Short Drama	Saya, Saya (Bird, Bird)	Nominated	
KBS Drama Awards	2016	Excellence Award, Actor in a Miniseries	Descendants of the Sun	Nominated	
KBS Drama Awards	2016	Best Couple (with Kim Ji-won)	Descendants of the Sun	Won	
KBS 감동대상	2011	Hope Award	Jin Goo	Won	
Korean Culture & Entertainment Awards	2009	Excellence Award, Movie Actor Category	Mother	Won	
Korean Culture & Entertainment Awards	2022	Best Actor Award	The Witch: Part 2. The Other One	Won	
Korean Film Awards	2006	Best Supporting Actor	A Dirty Carnival	Nominated	
Korea Junior Star Awards	2009	Special Award	Truck	Won	
Max Movie Awards	2010	Best Supporting Actor	Mother	Nominated	
MBC Drama Awards	2025	Best Character Award	Moon River	Won	
SBS Drama Awards	2008	Best Supporting Actor in a Special Planning Drama	Tokyo Sun Shower	Nominated	
University Film Festival of Korea	2009	Best Supporting Actor	Mother	Won	
