= How to Buy a Friend =

2020 South Korean television series

- Promotional poster
- Hangul: 계약우정
- Hanja: 契約友情
- Lit.: Friendship Contract
- RR: Gyeyagujeong
- MR: Kyeyagujŏng
- Genre: Romantic comedy; Coming of age; Melodrama
- Based on: Friendship Contract by Laad Kwon
- Developed by: KBS Drama Production
- Written by: Kim Joo-man
- Directed by: Yoo Young-eun
- Starring: Lee Shin-young; Shin Seung-ho; Kim So-hye; Oh Hee-joon; Min Do-hee; Cho Yi-hyun
- Music by: Choi In-hee
- Country of origin: South Korea
- Original language: Korean
- No. of episodes: 8 (Note: In order to circumvent Korean laws that prevent commercial breaks in the middle of an episode, what would previously have been aired as single 70 minute episodes are now being repackaged as two 35 minute episodes, with two episodes being shown each night with a commercial break between the two.)

Production
- Executive producers: Kim Yong-jin; Sohn Jae-sung; Moon Joon-ha
- Producer: Lee Hyun-kyung
- Camera setup: Single-camera
- Running time: 35 minutes
- Production company: Mega Monster

Original release
- Network: KBS2
- Release: April 6 – April 14, 2020

How to Buy a Friend (Korean: 계약우정) is a 2020 South Korean television series starring Lee Shin-young, Shin Seung-ho, Kim So-hye, Oh Hee-joon, Min Do-hee, and Cho Yi-hyun. Based on the Daum webtoon Friendship Contract by Laad Kwon, it aired on KBS2 from April 6 to 14, 2020.

== Synopsis ==
Two teenagers begin a contractual relationship — Heo Don-hyuk promises to protect Park Chan-hong from his bully if the latter helps him uncover the truth behind the suicide of his girlfriend.

== Cast ==
=== Main ===
- Lee Shin-young as Park Chan-hong

Also known as Ninja among his schoolmates, he is an ordinary high school student who has a talent for writing. He has a crush on Uhm Se-yoon.

- Shin Seung-ho as Heo Don-hyuk

Also known as Iron Man, he is notoriously known for his fists and has fought 10 men at one shot. He landed in juvenile detention and came to the school that Chan-hong, Se-yoon and Kyung-pyo attend.

- Kim So-hye as Uhm Se-yoon

The prettiest and most popular girl in school.

- Oh Hee-joon as Oh Kyung-pyo

Chan-hong's best friend.

- Min Do-hee as Choi Mi-ra

Se-yoon's best friend. She was also close to Seo-jung in arts class.

- Cho Yi-hyun as Shin Seo-jung

A senior who committed suicide at school, she was an art student who was close to Se-yoon and Mi-ra when she was alive.

=== Supporting ===
==== Chan-hong's family ====
- Kim Won-hae as Park Choong-chae
- Baek Ji-won as Oh Jung-hee

==== Pyung-seop's people ====
- Jang Hye-jin as Jo Pyung-seop
- Kim Do-wan as Kwak Sang-pil

==== Jeil High people ====
- Kim In-kwon as Woo Tae-jung
- Kim So-ra as Choi Jung-won
- Lee Jung-hyun as Kim Dae-yong
- Yoo Se-hyung as Ahn Seong-do

== Production ==
The first script reading took place in January 2020 at KBS Annex Broadcasting Station in Yeouido, Seoul, South Korea.

== Original soundtrack ==
How to Buy a Friend

Soundtrack album by Various Artists
- Released: 2020
- Genre: Soundtrack
- Languages: Korean; English
- Label: Danal Entertainment

=== Part 1 ===
Released on April 6, 2020
No.	Title	Lyrics	Music	Artist	Length
1.	"It Was Spring" (그때가 봄이었더라)	Major League	Major League	Joo Ye-in	3:48
2.	"It Was Spring" (Inst.)		Major League		3:48
Total length:					7:36

=== Part 2 ===
Released on April 7, 2020
No.	Title	Lyrics	Music	Artist	Length
1.	"My Friend"	Nafla	Kim Tae-san; Nafla	Nafla	3:07
2.	"My Friend" (Inst.)		Kim Tae-san; Nafla		3:07
Total length:					6:14

=== Part 3 ===
Released on April 12, 2020
No.	Title	Lyrics	Music	Artist	Length
1.	"One & Only"	Ha Sun-ho	Han Seung-soo; Ha Sun-ho	Ha Sun-ho	2:42
2.	"One & Only" (Inst.)		Han Seung-soo; Ha Sun-ho		2:42
Total length:					5:24

=== Part 4 ===
Released on April 13, 2020
No.	Title	Lyrics	Music	Artist	Length
1.	"I Saw You in My Dream" (꿈에서 널 봤어)	Kangaroo; Rhinoceros	Crazy Park	Lee Min-hyuk	3:48
2.	"I Saw You in My Dream" (Inst.)		Crazy Park		3:48
Total length:					7:36

=== Part 5 ===
Released on April 14, 2020
No.	Title	Lyrics	Music	Artist	Length
1.	"Still Love"	Major League; Kim Dong-ha	Major League; Buzzer Beater	A.C.E (Note: Performed by A.C.E members Kim Byeongkwan and Chan.)	3:29
2.	"Still Love" (Inst.)		Major League; Buzzer Beater		3:29
Total length:					6:58

== Awards and nominations ==
Year	Award	Category	Recipient	Result
2020	34th KBS Drama Awards	Best Supporting Actress	Baek Ji-won	Nominated
2020	34th KBS Drama Awards	Best Supporting Actress	Jang Hye-jin	Nominated
2020	34th KBS Drama Awards	Best Actor in a One-Act/Special/Short Drama	Lee Shin-young	Won
2020	34th KBS Drama Awards	Best Actor in a One-Act/Special/Short Drama	Shin Seung-ho	Nominated
2020	34th KBS Drama Awards	Best New Actress	Kim So-hye	Nominated

== Ratings ==
In this table, the blue numbers represent the lowest ratings and the red numbers represent the highest ratings.

Ep.	Broadcast date	Title	
Ep.	Broadcast date	Title	Average audience share (Nielsen Korea)
1	April 6, 2020	What Could You Possibly Do With a Poem? (시따위로 뭘 할 수 있겠어?)	2.3%
2	April 6, 2020	What Could You Possibly Do With a Poem? (시따위로 뭘 할 수 있겠어?)	2.7%
3	April 7, 2020	The Limits of Poetic License (시적허용의 범위)	1.4%
4	April 7, 2020	The Limits of Poetic License (시적허용의 범위)	1.6%
5	April 13, 2020	What Rhythm Has Taught Me (운율이 내게 가르쳐 준 것)	2.6%
6	April 13, 2020	What Rhythm Has Taught Me (운율이 내게 가르쳐 준 것)	2.4%
7	April 14, 2020	—N/a (Note: Episodes 7 and 8 were not given any title.)	1.4%
8	April 14, 2020	—N/a	1.8%
Average			2.0%
