= Gangnam Beauty =

2018 South Korean television series

- Promotional poster
- Also known as: ID: Gangnam Beauty
- Hangul: 내 아이디는 강남미인
- Hanja: 내 아이디는 江南美人
- Lit.: My ID Is Gangnam Beauty
- RR: Nae aidineun Gangnammiin
- MR: Nae aidinŭn Kangnammiin
- Genre: Coming of age; Romance comedy; Drama
- Based on: My ID Is Gangnam Beauty by Gi Maeng-gi
- Written by: Choi Soo-young
- Directed by: Choi Sung-bum
- Starring: Im Soo-hyang; Cha Eun-woo; Jo Woo-ri; Kwak Dong-yeon
- Country of origin: South Korea
- Original language: Korean
- No. of episodes: 16

Production
- Executive producers: Hwang In-roe; Jo Jun-hyung; Kim Dong-hyun
- Producers: Choi Young-joong; Jang Ji-yeon; Kim Kyung-tae; Yang Se-jin
- Camera setup: Single camera
- Running time: 60 minutes
- Production companies: Art & Culture (Note: A subsidiary of Creative Leaders Group Eight)

Original release
- Network: JTBC
- Release: July 27 – September 15, 2018

Related
- Beauty Newbie (2024, Thailand remake)

Gangnam Beauty (Korean: 내 아이디는 강남미인) is a 2018 South Korean television series starring Im Soo-hyang, Cha Eun-woo, Jo Woo-ri and Kwak Dong-yeon. Based on the webtoon of the same name published in 2016 by Naver, it centers on the life of a college student who had cosmetic surgery to evade ongoing derision from her bullies. However, her decision seems to backfire as her peers ridicule her artificial look. The title of the webtoon and of the TV series alludes to the Korean word gangnammiin (Gangnam beauty), a derogatory term in South Korea for people who are attractive but look as if they went through a number of plastic surgeries for a pretty face, a hot body or both.

The series aired on JTBC from July 27 to September 15, 2018, every Friday and Saturday at 23:00 (KST). It garnered praise for its portrayal of issues affecting South Korean society, particularly on its superficial beauty standards and discrimination on the basis of physical appearance.

== Synopsis ==
Kang Mi-rae decides to get plastic surgery after years of being bullied because of her looks. Her "rebirth" seems successful at first, but as her life at the university unfolds, her plan starts to backfire. The pressure of being a "pretty girl" begins to get to her and, worse, those who can see through her surgery ridicule her and tag her as the "Gangnam plastic surgery monster". Mi-rae tries to recover her self-esteem as she gets to know her former middle school classmate Do Kyung-seok who is quite cold to others but very affectionate towards his sister Do Kyung-hee.

== Cast ==
=== Main ===
- Im Soo-hyang as Kang Mi-rae
  - Jeon Min-seo as young Kang Mi-rae

A timid and insecure girl who has low self-esteem due to her "ugly" appearance. She desires to live a "normal" life and does not like standing out. After being bullied throughout her middle school and high school, she finally decides to undergo cosmetic surgery prior to starting college. As she enters the university, she starts to feel the pressure of being "beautiful" and "popular" among her peers. She aspires to be a perfumer. A student of Chemistry Department of Korea University Class of 2018.

- Cha Eun-woo as Do Kyung-seok
  - Shin Jun-seop as young Do Kyung-seok
  - Moon Woo-jin as child Do Kyung-seok

A handsome college student who possesses both intelligence and wealth, but secretly harbors emotional scars from his unhappy home environment. He is indifferent about what others think, thus appearing cold and distant; however, he does have a caring side within him. In particular, he does not care about beauty or physical appearances despite being praised for his good looks. A student of Chemistry Department of Korea University Class of 2018.

- Jo Woo-ri as Hyun Soo-ah
  - Lee Chae-yun as young Hyun Soo-ah

The most popular girl in the chemistry department for her extraordinary natural beauty. She appears pure and kind, but the underlying motives of her actions eventually prove otherwise. She craves attention and adoration, attempting to attain it (or, at times, steal it) with her gentle and innocent persona as she cannot accept the potential for anyone to love other girls more than they admire her. A student of Chemistry Department of Korea University Class of 2018.

- Kwak Dong-yeon as Yeon Woo-young

A chemistry graduate and teaching assistant in the chemistry department. He is also Do Kyung-seok's housemate later on. He is popular among the students for his handsome appearance and also his friendly and polite persona. He falls for Kang Mi-rae for her looks but grows to love her personality as they both share their expertise in perfumes.

=== Supporting ===
==== People around Kang Mi-rae ====
- Woo Hyun as Kang Tae-sik

Kang Mi-rae's father and a taxi driver. He is initially against Mi-rae's surgery, but later learns to accept all forms of her.

- Kim Sun-hwa as Na Eun-sim

Kang Mi-rae's mother and an insurance planner. She assists Mi-rae in receiving cosmetic surgery without the knowledge of her father.

- Min Do-hee as Oh Hyun-jung

A childhood friend of Kang Mi-rae. A first-year psychology student in Korea University who dreams of being a hip-hop musician. She has a crush on Yeon Woo-young.

==== People around Do Kyung-seok ====
- Park Joo-mi as Na Hye-sung

Do Kyung-seok's mother and CEO of a perfume company. Due to a traumatic fight, she loses her sense of smell and later gets divorce from the abusive marriage, she has been separated from her children for years, until she met her son again through Kang Mi-rae.

- Park Sung-geun as Do Sang-won

Do Kyung-seok's father as well as a congressman running for mayor. A self-centered and career-oriented who gets things done because of money and power.

- Kim Ji-min as Do Kyung-hee

Do Kyung-seok's 17-year-old sister and an internet broadcasting jockey.

- Lee Tae-sun as Woo-jin

Do Kyung-seok's childhood friend and a bar owner.

==== Chemistry students ====
- Park Yoo-na as Yoo Eun

The freshmen (Class of 2018) representative. Her chic personality makes her popular among the students. She has an innate sense of fairness and takes no sides in any conflict. She encounters Soo-ah in her neighborhood and starts questioning her actual family background.

- Jung Seung-hye as Choi Jung-boon

A freshman. A cheerful girl from Busan with a strong accent. She has a crush on Woo-jin.

- Jung Hye-rin as Lee Ji-hyo

A freshman who is close friends with Soo-ah. Considered as the prettiest in her class after Soo-ah and Mi-rae. She is self-conscious about her physical appearance and what people think of her.

- Kim Doh-yon as Jang Won-ho

A freshman. He has a crush on Soo-ah, and treats Kyung-seok as his biggest rival.

- Kim Eun-soo as Kim Sung-woon

A freshman and Jung Won-ho's best friend.

- Oh Hee-joon as Kim Chan-woo

A student from Class of 2013. He is in his third year of repeat studies. He is known as "Master Dog" due to his crude personality. He bullies Mi-rae after she rejected his confession, and develops a crush on Soo-ah. He later gets beat up by Kyung-seok for bullying Mi-rae while Woo-young threatens to ruin his future if he ever does it again.

- Ryu Ki-san as Goo Tae-young

A second-year student. President of the student council. He has an indecisive personality and wavers in his decision to date Tae-hee.

- Baek Soo-min as Go Ye-na

A sophomore. A student council member in charge of student affairs. She used to be the most popular girl of the Chemistry Department till Soo-ah came along. She has a crush on Kyung-seok, but later develops feelings for Jung-ho.

- Bae Da-bin as Kwon Yoon-byul

The representative of the sophomores (Class of 2017). Vice president of the student council. She is decisive and responsible, with an honest and blunt personality. Because of her boyish looks, she is popular among women. She later develops a crush on Woo-young, but is rejected.

- Lee Ye-rim as Kim Tae-hee

A sophomore. She is the secretary of the student council. She feels insecure due to her plump body. She likes Tae-young.

- Choi Sung-won as Song Jung-ho

A sophomore. He is a mood maker. He has a crush on Ye-na since the first year. He joins the army after his sophomore year.

- Seo Ji-hye as Noh Min-a

A sophomore who likes to gossip.

- Kim Il-rin as Yeo-woo

The representative of the third year students (Class of 2016). A superficial person who only cares about physical appearances.

- Ham Sung-min as Jung Dong-won

A freshman. He is a motae solo and otaku with a huge presence on the Internet community. He is deluded that Soo-ah likes him.

- Kim Min-ha as Sun-mi

A second-year student. She has a great relationship with the juniors.

==== Others ====
- Jung Myung-hoon as Young-mo

Chief of the National Assembly and Do Sang-won's assistant.

- Ji Sang-hyuk as Lee Soo-hyun

Business director of the cosmetics company operated by Nae-seong.

- Ha Kyung as Yong Chul

Mi-rae's middle school crush who brutally rejected her, mostly due to her physical appearance.

- Yoo In-soo as Park Rae-sun
- Cha Bo-sung as Ye Joon, a freshman (Ep. 2-3)

=== Special appearances ===
- Lee Young-ae
- Um Hong-gil
- Ahn Sang-tae as Taxi passenger
- Junoflo
- Jeon Jin-ki as Priest
- Yoon Bo-ra
- Tiger JK
- Bizzy
- Han Hyun-min
- Abhishek Gupta

== Production ==
- The series is written by Choi Soo-young (Cunning Single Lady, 2014).
- The first script reading took place on May 30, 2018 at JTBC building in Sangam-dong, Seoul, South Korea.
- On December 26, 2024, the show will have a Japanese adaptation titled I'm a Cosmetic Surgery Beauty, with the leads portrayed by Kyoya Honda and Anna Ishii.

== Reception ==
The series garnered much praise for its cryptic portrayal of the main character's childhood. Viewers applauded director Choi for his thoughtful representation of the characters.

The series was a commercial success and garnered critical praise for asking questions about the emphasis that society places on appearances and about the true meaning of happiness and beauty.

The cast and staff of the drama went on a reward vacation to Cebu, Philippines for 4 nights and 5 days on October 19, 2018.

== Original soundtrack ==
Gangnam Beauty OST

Soundtrack album by Various artists
- Released: 2018
- Genre: Soundtrack
- Languages: Korean; English
- Labels: Warner Music Group, withHC

=== Part 1 ===
Released on August 3, 2018
No.	Title	Lyrics	Music	Artist	Length
1.	"Love Diamond"	Mathi, Park Geun-chul, Jung Su-min	Park Geun-chul, Jung Su-min	Weki Meki (Note: Credited as a song by Weki Meki, sung by members Ji Su-yeon and Elly)	02:55
2.	"True"	Runy, Park Geun-chul, Jung Su-min	Park Geun-chul, Jung Su-min	Runy	03:17
3.	"Love Diamond" (Inst.)		Park Geun-chul, Jung Su-min		02:55
4.	"True" (Inst.)		Park Geun-chul, Jung Su-min		03:17
Total length:					12:24

=== Part 2 ===
Released on August 10, 2018
No.	Title	Lyrics	Music	Artist	Length
1.	"You Are My..." (향수)	Mathi, Park Geun-chul, Jung Su-min	Park Geun-chul, Jung Su-min	Celine	04:40
2.	"You Are My..." (Inst.)		Park Geun-chul, Jung Su-min		04:40
Total length:					09:20

=== Part 3 ===
Released on August 11, 2018
No.	Title	Lyrics	Music	Artist	Length
1.	"No No"	Mathi, Park Geun-chul	Runy, Iver	Owol	03:25
2.	"No No" (Inst.)		Runy, Iver		03:25
Total length:					06:50

=== Part 4 ===
Released on August 17, 2018
No.	Title	Lyrics	Music	Artist	Length
1.	"Something"	Kang Hye-in, Mathi, Park Geun-chul	Ryu Young-min, Park Geun-chul, Jung Su-min	George, Kang Hye-in	03:51
2.	"Something" (Inst.)		Ryu Young-min, Park Geun-chul, Jung Su-min		03:51
Total length:					07:42

=== Part 5 ===
Released on August 24, 2018
No.	Title	Lyrics	Music	Artist	Length
1.	"D-Day"	Mathi, Park Geun-chul	Park Geun-chul, Runy, Iver	Junggigo	03:31
2.	"D-Day" (Inst.)		Park Geun-chul, Runy, Iver		03:31
Total length:					07:02

=== Part 6 ===
Released on August 25, 2018
No.	Title	Lyrics	Music	Artist	Length
1.	"Always You"	Mathi, Jung Su-min, Park Geun-chul	Mathi, Jung Su-min, Park Geun-chul	Jin Min-ho	04:21
2.	"Always You" (Inst.)		Mathi, Jung Su-min, Park Geun-chul		04:21
Total length:					08:42

=== Part 7 ===
Released on August 31, 2018
No.	Title	Lyrics	Music	Artist	Length
1.	"Rainbow Falling"	Mathi, Park Geun-chul, HowL, Jung Su-min	Jung Su-min, Park Geun-chul, Mathi, HowL	Cha Eun-woo (Astro)	04:00
2.	"Rainbow Falling" (Inst.)		Jung Su-min, Park Geun-chul, Mathi, HowL		04:00
Total length:					08:00

=== Part 8 ===
Released on September 7, 2018
No.	Title	Lyrics	Music	Artist	Length
1.	"Let's Go"	HowL, DL, Kim Bo-sung	Hong Joon-seok, Francisco Iovino	A-yeon, Cha-hee (Melody Day)	03:16
2.	"Let's Go" (Inst.)		Hong Joon-seok, Francisco Iovino		03:16
Total length:					06:32

=== Part 9 ===
Released on September 15, 2018
No.	Title	Lyrics	Music	Artist	Length
1.	"Holiday"	Hoteudogeu, Kim Bo-sung	HowL, Kim Bo-sung	Yeoeun (Melody Day)	03:51
2.	"Holiday" (Inst.)		HowL, Kim Bo-sung		03:51
Total length:					07:42

Disc 2:
No.	Title	Artist	Length
1.	"My ID (Opening Title)"	Various Artists	1:22
2.	"My ID (Mother theme)"	Various Artists	2:29
3.	"My ID Doo Bae Doo Bae"	Various Artists	1:58
4.	"First Love Waltz"	Various Artists	2:19
5.	"First Love Waltz (Vocal Version)"	Various Artists	2:01
6.	"Amazing"	Various Artists	1:50
7.	"The Moment I Fell in Love"	Various Artists	2:29
8.	"Love Letter I"	Various Artists	1:48
9.	"Witch Comic (Slow Version)"	Various Artists	2:35
10.	"Too Lost"	Various Artists	3:00
11.	"Rainy Day Date"	Various Artists	2:29
12.	"The Way to Her Heart"	Various Artists	2:28
13.	"Something in Your Eyes"	Various Artists	1:59

== Viewership ==
Gangnam Beauty : South Korea viewers per episode (millions)

Season	Episode number																Average
Season	1	2	3	4	5	6	7	8	9	10	11	12	13	14	15	16	Average
1	0.754	0.878	0.916	1.197	0.944	1.075	1.076	1.296	1.242	1.385	1.127	1.620	1.261	1.572	1.485	1.643	1.217

Source: Audience measurement performed nationwide by Nielsen Media Research.

Average TV viewership ratings
Ep.	Original broadcast date	Title	Average audience share	
Ep.	Original broadcast date	Title	Nielsen Korea	
Ep.	Original broadcast date	Title	Nationwide	Seoul
1	July 27, 2018	I'm Pretty Starting Today (오늘부터 예뻐요)	2.885%	3.049%
2	July 28, 2018	You Have To Be Pretty From The Start (원래부터 예뻐야죠)	3.302%	3.509%
3	August 3, 2018	You Don't Even Know (알지도 못하면서)	3.066%	3.355%
4	August 4, 2018	You'll Meet Anyone Destined For You To Meet (만날 사람은 만나게 된다)	4.027%	4.061%
5	August 10, 2018	The Genius Face's Counterattack 1 (얼굴천재의 역습 1)	3.326%	3.837%
6	August 11, 2018	The Genius Face's Counterattack 2 (얼굴천재의 역습 2)	3.612%	3.415%
7	August 17, 2018	A Male Friend (남자사람친구)	3.963%	4.784%
8	August 18, 2018	Basic Instincts (원초적 본능)	4.392%	4.542%
9	August 24, 2018	A Twenty-Year-Old's Survival Story (스무살의 생존기)	4.391%	5.046%
10	August 25, 2018	I Can Be Your Boyfriend (남자친구여도 괜찮잖아)	5.022%	5.549%
11	August 31, 2018	Your ID is Gangnam Beauty (너의 아이디는 강남미인)	4.492%	4.598%
12	September 1, 2018	Don't You Have Feelings For Me? (너 나 안 좋아하냐?)	5.436%	5.825%
13	September 7, 2018	It's My First Love (첫사랑이다)	4.768%	5.513%
14	September 8, 2018	Start Secretly (시작은 비밀스럽게)	5.033%	5.265%
15	September 14, 2018	My Boyfriend is Do Kyung-seok (내 남자친구는 도경석)	4.832%	5.783%
16	September 15, 2018	Even Though We Don't Know Much About Life Yet (아직 인생은 모르지만)	5.753%	6.186%
Average			4.269%	4.645%
In the table above, the blue numbers represent the lowest ratings and the red numbers represent the highest ratings.; This drama aired on a cable channel/pay TV which normally has a relatively smaller audience compared to free-to-air TV/public broadcasters (KBS, SBS, MBC and EBS).

== Awards and nominations ==
Year	Award	Category	Recipient	Result	Ref.
2018	11th Korea Drama Awards	Best New Actor	Cha Eun-woo	Won	
2018	11th Korea Drama Awards	Hallyu Star Award	Cha Eun-woo	Won	
2018	11th Korea Drama Awards	Star of the Year Award	Jo Woo-ri	Won	
2018	26th Korea Culture and Entertainment Awards	Top Excellence Award, Actress in a Drama	Im Soo-hyang	Won	
2019	14th Annual Soompi Awards	Breakout Actor	Cha Eun-woo	Won	
2019	14th Annual Soompi Awards	Best Idol Actor	Cha Eun-woo	Nominated	
2019	14th Annual Soompi Awards	Best Couple	Cha Eun-woo and Im Soo-hyang	Nominated	
2019	1st iQiyi Entertainment Awards	Most Charming Actor	Cha Eun-woo	Won	
