= The ESP Couple =

- Theatrical poster
- Hangul: 초감각 커플
- RR: Chogamgak keopeul
- MR: Ch'ogamgak k'ŏp'ŭl
- Directed by: Kim Hyung-joo
- Written by: Kim Hyung-joo
- Produced by: Jang Sung-yeun
- Starring: Jin Goo; Park Bo-young
- Production company: Cross Film
- Distributed by: Cross Film
- Release date: November 27, 2008
- Running time: 85 minutes
- Country: South Korea
- Language: Korean
- Box office: US$22,031

The ESP Couple (Korean: 초감각 커플; RR: Chogamgak keopeul) is a 2008 South Korean supernatural romance film starring Jin Goo and Park Bo-young. The film marks editor Kim Hyung-joo's debut as a director.

== Synopsis ==
Su-min (Jin Goo) is a college student who keeps his psychic powers a secret, living a quiet, lonely life. One day at an art gallery he is accosted by a strange girl called Hyun-jin (Park Bo-young) who insists on following him around. After an incident in the park involving an undercover police attempt to arrest a kidnapper gives her a display of his abilities, she attaches herself to him, determined to find out exactly what he is capable of. His feelings for her gradually change from annoyance to romantic yearning, though she herself appears to be hiding a secret of her own.

== Cast ==
- Jin Goo as Su-min
  - Ham Sung-min as young Su-min
- Park Bo-young as Hyun-jin
- Jo Yeon-ho
- Lee Sang-hong
- Min Ji-min
- Han Gap-soo
