= Jo Woo-ri =

South Korean actress (born 1992)

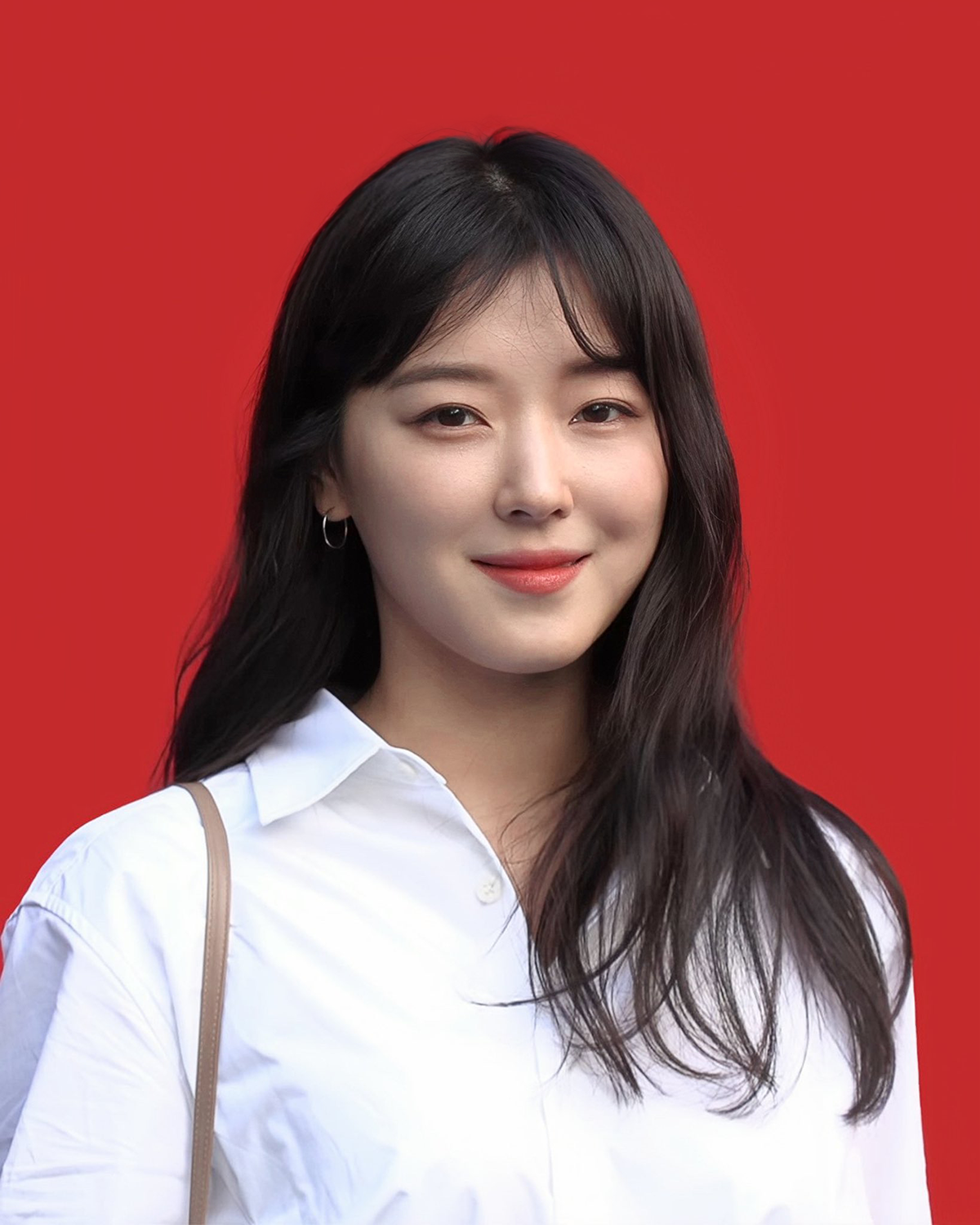
- Jo in 2018
- Born: March 29, 1992 (age 34); Seoul, South Korea
- Occupation: Actress
- Years active: 2011–present
- Agent: FN Entertainment

Korean name
- Hangul: 조우리
- Hanja: 趙友利
- RR: Jo Uri
- MR: Cho Uri

Jo Woo-ri (Korean: 조우리; born March 29, 1992) is a South Korean actress. She starred in television series such as Medical Top Team (2013), Modern Farmer (2014), A Daughter Just Like You (2015), Descendants of the Sun (2016) and Gangnam Beauty (2018).

== Career ==
In April 2022, Jo signed an exclusive contract with Namoo Actors.

In June 2025, Jo signed an exclusive contract with FN Entertainment.

== Filmography ==
Key
†	Denotes television productions that have not yet been released

=== Television series ===
Year	Title	Role	Notes	Ref.
2011	Dimo	Seo Kyung-jong		
2012	Dura and Dimo	Friend of Se-yeon	KBS Drama Special	
2012	Can Love Become Money	Young Yoon Da-ran		
2012	Friendly Criminal	Young Yeong-hwa	Drama Special	
2012	Jeon Woo-chi	Sol-mi	Drama Special	
2013	Sirius	So-ri		
2013	Pure Love	Go Da-bi		
2013	Medical Top Team	Yeo Min-Ji		
2014	Modern Farmer	Hwang I-ji		
2015	A Daughter Just Like You	So Jeong-i		
2016	Descendants of the Sun	Jang Hee-eun		
2017	Witch at Court	Jin Yeon-hee		
2017	Two Cops	Min-ah		
2018	Queen of Mystery 2	Yoon Mi-joo		
2018	Welcome to Waikiki	Kim Seon-woo	Cameo	
2018	Gangnam Beauty	Hyun Soo-ah		
2018	Life on Mars	Jung-hee	Cameo	
2019–2020	Beautiful Love, Wonderful Life	Moon Hae-rang		
2020	Men Are Men	Han Seo-yoon		
2026	Sold Out on You	Moon Ae-ra		

=== Web series ===
Year	Title	Role	Notes	Ref.
2019	Will Be Okay, Never Die	Oh Min-joo	Studio DIA channel	

== Awards and nominations ==
Name of the award ceremony, year presented, category, nominee of the award, and the result of the nomination
Award ceremony	Year	Category	Nominee / Work	Result	Ref.
KBS Drama Awards	2018	Best New Actress	Queen of Mystery 2	Nominated	
Korea Drama Awards	2018	Star of the Year Award	Gangnam Beauty	Won	
Korea First Brand Awards	2018	Actress Award	Jo Woo-ri	Won	
