= Yeonsung University =

South Korean college in Anyang, Gyeonggi

- Hangul: 연성대학교
- Hanja: 硏成大學校
- RR: Yeonseong daehakgyo
- MR: Yŏnsŏng taehakkyo

Yeonsung University is a college in Manan-gu, Anyang City, Gyeonggi province, South Korea. It opened on March 15, 1977, as Anyang Industrial Technical School. It was officially designated a technical junior college in 1979. The school includes scientific faculties of electronic communications, computer information, industrial design, technology management, environmental engineering, interior construction; domestic faculties of hotel culinary management and fashion design; social service faculties of early childhood education, physical education, social welfare, English, tourism Chinese, and liberal arts. The campus covers 202,000 m^{2}, and also hosts a library and research institutes of industrial design, construction technology, Surface Mount Technology automation, and sports science. On September 1, 2010, Anyang Technical College was permitted to change the school's English name to Anyang Science University. Following this change, on May 23, 2012, Anyang Science University was officially renamed Yeonsung University.

== Notable people ==
- Oh Ji-ho, actor
- Shin Jung-geun, actor
- Hong Su-zu, model, actress

== See also ==
- Education in South Korea
- List of colleges and universities in South Korea
