= The Impossible Heir =

2024 South Korean series

- Promotional poster
- Hangul: 로얄로더
- Lit.: Royal Loader
- RR: Royal rodeo
- MR: Royal rodŏ
- Genre: Revenge drama; Workplace; Thriller
- Developed by: The Walt Disney Company Korea
- Written by: Choi Won
- Directed by: Min Yeon-hong; Lee Hyang-bong
- Starring: Lee Jae-wook; Lee Jun-young; Hong Su-zu
- Music by: Park Sung-il
- Country of origin: South Korea
- Original language: Korean
- No. of episodes: 12

Production
- Executive producers: Jung Yeon-ji; Kim Min; Cho Young-jae
- Producers: Kang Bo-young; Ahn Chang-ho; Lee Hyang-bong; Bae In-hyuk
- Cinematography: Jung Jin-ho; Kim Young-kwang
- Editors: Choi Joong-won; Choi So-hee
- Running time: 51–65 minutes
- Production companies: Slingshot Studio Co., Ltd; Neo Entertainment Co., Ltd.
- Budget: ₩20 billion

Original release
- Network: Disney+
- Release: February 28 – April 3, 2024

The Impossible Heir (Korean: 로얄로더) is a 2024 South Korean revenge drama workplace thriller television series written by Choi Won, directed by Min Yeon-hong, and starring Lee Jae-wook, Lee Jun-young, and Hong Su-zu. It is about a story of minor leaguers trying to take the throne of South Korea's largest conglomerate. It was released worldwide on Disney+ from February 28, to April 3, 2024, every Wednesday.

== Synopsis ==
Kang In-ha, who leaves his life of poverty behind after learning that he is an illegitimate son of a conglomerate owner. Shunned by the members of his new family, In-ha enlists the help of his childhood friend Han Tae-oh to come up with a plan to take over the company and seize their spots at the top of society.

== Cast and characters ==
=== Main ===
- Lee Jae-wook as Han Tae-oh

Son of a murderer father. He has a cold-blooded personality.

- Lee Jun-young as Kang In-ha

An illegitimate son of Kangoh Group.

- Hong Su-zu as Na Hye-won

Daughter of a debt collector.

=== Supporting ===
- Han Sang-jin as Kang In-joo

The first son of Kangoh Group and chairman of Kangoh Resort.

- Choi Jin-ho as Kang Jung-mo

In-joo's father who is chairman of Kangoh Group.

- Kim Ho-jung as Jang Geum-seok

In-joo's stepmother and Jung-mo's wife.

- Lee Ji-hoon as Kang Seong-ju

The second son of Kangoh Group.

- Kim Young-joo as Yoon Hyang-mi

Hye-won's mother.

- Ko Chang-seok as Chae Dong-wook

Tae-oh's teacher when he was a university professor and becomes the director of the Co-Prosperity Cooperation Center.

- Choi Hee-jin as Kang Hui-ju

Jung-mo's youngest daughter who falls in love with Tae-oh.

- Heo Nam-jun as Ha Myeong-jin
- Kwon Hyuk as In-ju's assistant
- Jang Hyuk-jin as Chu Hyuk-jin: Jung-mo's secretary.
- Choi Byung-mo as Han Kil-su: Tae-oh's stepfather.
- Woo Hyun as village chief

== Production ==
Filming began in 2023, and the series reportedly cost ₩20 billion (US$14.92 million).
