= Jang Ye-won =

South Korean television presenter

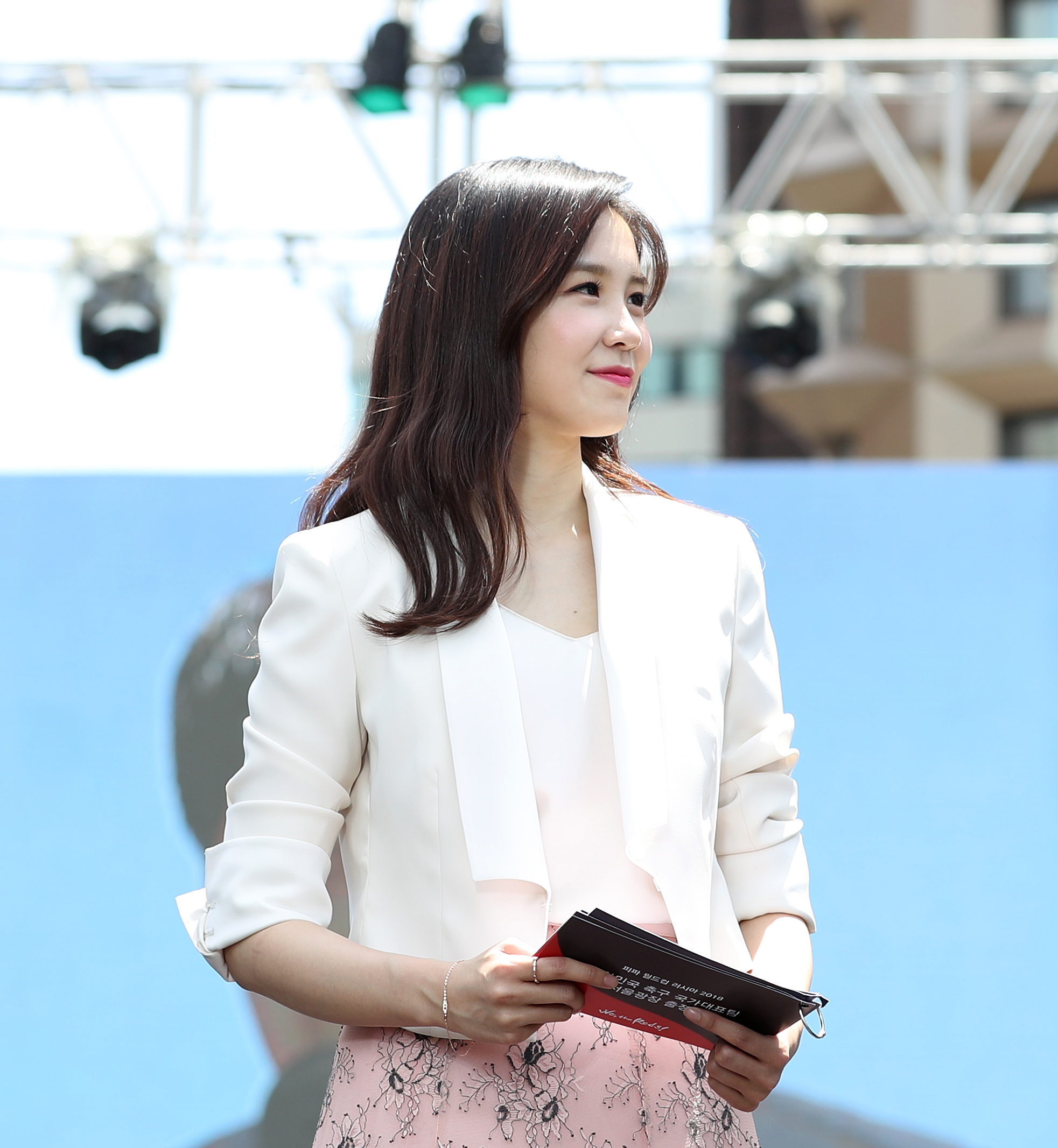
- Jang in 2014
- Born: July 14, 1990 (age 36); Seoul, South Korea
- Education: Sookmyung Women's University
- Occupations: Broadcast personality, host
- Years active: 2012–present
- Agent: SM C&C
- Relatives: Jang Ye-in (sister)

Korean name
- Hangul: 장예원
- Hanja: 張叡元
- RR: Jang Yewon
- MR: Chang Yewŏn

Jang Ye-won (Korean: 장예원; born July 14, 1990) is a South Korean television personality and host. She was an announcer under SBS from October 2012, when she was known as the youngest announcer in the history of SBS. Jang officially announced her departure from SBS in September 2020.

Jang signed with SM Culture & Contents on December 9, 2020.

== Filmography ==
=== Television shows ===
Year	Title	Role	Ref.
2014–2020	TV Animal Farm	Host	
2014–2016	Football Magazine Goal!	Host	
2016–2018	Game Show Yoo Hee Nak Rak	Host	
2020	Three Idiots (season 2)	Host	
2020–2021	Cap-Teen	Host	
2021	Bride X Club	Cheering squad	
2022	Can't Cheat Blood	Main Host	
2022	Naked Korean History	Cast Member	

=== Web show ===
Year	Title	Role	Ref.
2021	Jang Street	Host	

== Radio Show ==
Year	Title	Role	Ref.
2014–2017	Jang Ye-won's Tonight Like The Same Night	DJ	
2020	Jang Ye-won's Cinetown	DJ	
2022	This is Ahn Young-mi, the date muse at two o'clock	Special DJ	

== Awards and nominations ==
Name of the award ceremony, year presented, category, nominee of the award, and the result of the nomination
Award ceremony	Year	Category	Nominee / Work	Result	Ref.
SBS Entertainment Awards	2015	Radio DJ Newcomer Award	Jang Ye-won	Won	
Sports Marketing Awards	2018	Sports Announcer/Commentator Special Award	Jang Ye-won	Won	
