= Hong Su-zu =

South Korean actress (born 1994)

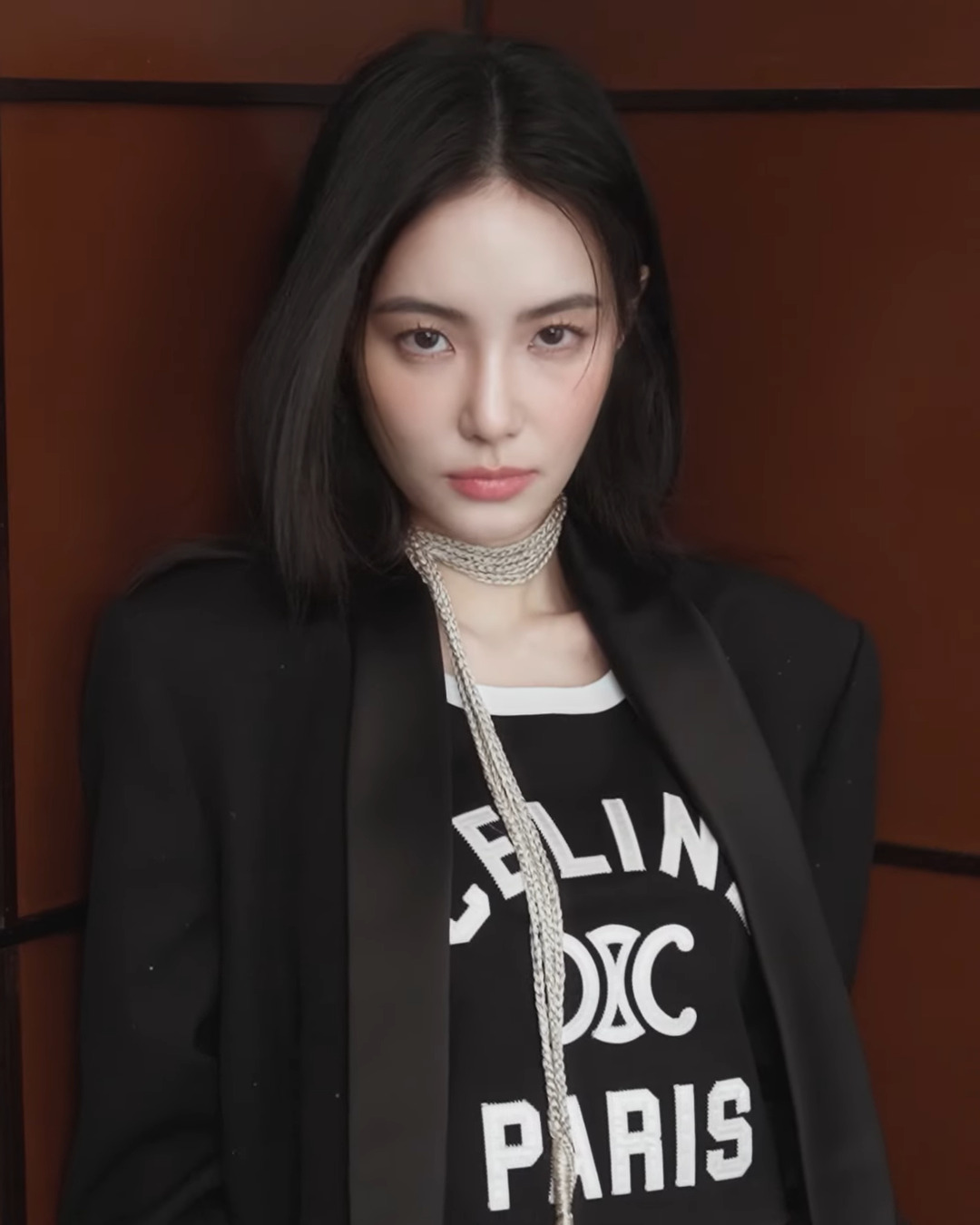
- Hong in 2023
- Born: February 12, 1994 (age 32)
- Education: Yeonsung University
- Occupation: Actress
- Years active: 2019–present
- Agent: MAA
- Website: maa.co.kr

Hong Su-zu (Korean: 홍수주; born February 12, 1994) is a South Korean model and actress. She made her debuted in Music Video Loss by Colde in 2019. She is known for her role as Na Hye-won in The Impossible Heir (2024).

== Early life and education ==
Hong graduated from the Department of Airline Service at Yeonsung University.

She used to work as a part-time fitting model before joining her current agency, MAA, where she began her career as a commercial model and actress.

== Filmography ==
=== Television series ===
Year	Title	Role	Notes	Ref.
2021	KBS Drama Special— Be;twin	Hong Chung	Episode 6, One-act drama	
2025	Moon River	Kim Woo-hee		

=== Web series ===
Year	Title	Role	Notes	Ref.
2020	Lovestruck in the City	Hae-na		
2023–2024	Sweet Home	Jin-A	Season 2–3	
2024	The Impossible Heir	Na Hye-won		
2026	The East Palace	the favored court lady		

=== Music video appearances ===
Year	Song title	Artist	Ref.
2019	"Loss" (상실)	Colde	
2019	"SSFW" (봄 여름 가을 겨울)	Chanyeol of EXO	
2019	"I LUV U"	Henry	
2023	"Alley" (골목길)	Lee Hi feat. Sung Si-kyung	
2024	"My Beloved" (그대가 해준 말)	Lee Hi	
2024	"Pineapple Slice"	Baekhyun	

== Awards and nominations ==
Name of the award ceremony, year presented, category, nominee of the award, and the result of the nomination
Award ceremony	Year	Category	Nominee / Work	Result	Ref.
MBC Drama Awards	2025	Best New Actress	Moon River	Won	
