= Game Show Yoo Hee Nak Rak =

- Promotional poster
- Genre: Game show
- Starring: Kim Hee-chul; Hong Jin-ho; Lee Jin-ho; Kim So-hye; Lee Dawon; Bae Sung-jae; Jang Ye-won
- Country of origin: South Korea
- Original language: Korean
- No. of episodes: 50

Production
- Running time: 60 minutes

Original release
- Network: SBS TV, SBS funE
- Release: December 20, 2016 – January 12, 2018

Game Show Yoo Hee Nak Rak (Korean: 게임쇼유희낙락) is a 2016 South Korean television program starring Kim Hee-chul, Bae Sung-jae, and Jang Ye-won about video games.

== Broadcast time ==
Broadcast channel	Broadcast period	Airtime	Broadcast
SBS TV
SBS TV	December 20, 2016 – December 27, 2016	Every Tuesday 01:00 – 02:00	60 minutes
SBS TV	January 6, 2017 – April 28, 2017	Every Friday 12:50 – 01:50	60 minutes
SBS TV	May 5, 2017 – January 12, 2018	Every Friday 12:40 – 01:40	60 minutes

== Format ==
A video game variety show with celebrity hosts that aims to create a healthy gaming culture. Kim Heechul and other celebrity show hosts introduce and play a variety of video games as they demonstrate how video games can become a tool for improving creativity as well as a hobby.

== Cast ==
- Main Host
  - Kim Hee-chul (Super Junior)
- Host
  - Hong Jin-ho
  - Bae Sung-jae
  - Lee Jin-ho
  - Jang Ye-won
  - Kim So-hye
  - Lee Dawon (SF9)
  - Shindong (Super Junior)
  - Oh Ha-young (Apink)
  - Ellin

== List of episodes and ratings ==
In the table below, the blue numbers represent the lowest ratings and the red numbers represent the highest ratings each year.

List of ratings (episode 1–50)

Episode #	Air Date	AGB Nielsen ratings (increase / decrease)
2016
1	December 20, 2016	0.7%
2	December 27, 2016	0.4% (-0.3)
2017
3	January 6, 2017	1.5% (+1.1)
4	January 13, 2017	1.5% (0)
5	January 20, 2017	1.6% (+0.1)
6	February 3, 2017	2.0% (+0.4)
7	February 10, 2017	2.3% (+0.3)
8	February 17, 2017	1.2% (-1.1)
9	February 24, 2017	1.8% (+0.6)
10	March 3, 2017	1.8% (0)
11	March 17, 2017	1.6% (-0.2)
12	March 24, 2017	1.8% (+0.2)
13	March 31, 2017	1.4% (-0.4)
14	April 7, 2017	1.9% (+0.5)
15	April 14, 2017	1.1% (-0.8)
16	April 21, 2017	0.7% (-0.4)
17	April 28, 2017	1.4% (+0.7)
17	April 28, 2017	1.0% (-0.4)
18	May 5, 2017	1.0% (0)
19	May 12, 2017	0.8% (-0.2)
20	May 19, 2017	1.0% (+0.2)
21	May 26, 2017	1.3% (+0.3)
22	June 2, 2017	1.4% (+0.1)
23	June 16, 2017	0.8% (-0.6)
24	June 23, 2017	0.9% (+0.4)
25	June 30, 2017	0.9% (0)
26	July 7, 2017	0.9% (0)
27	July 14, 2017	0.9% (0)
28	July 21, 2017	1.4% (+0.5)
29	July 28, 2017	1.6% (+0.2)
30	August 4, 2017	1.0% (-0.6)
31	August 11, 2017	1.0% (0)
32	August 18, 2017	0.9% (-0.1)
33	August 25, 2017	1.2% (+0.3)
34	September 1, 2017	0.8% (-0.4)
35	September 8, 2017	1.5% (+0.7)
36	September 15, 2017	0.7% (-0.8)
37	September 22, 2017	0.7% (0)
38	October 13, 2017	1.0% (+0.3)
39	October 20, 2017	0.3% (-0.7)
40	October 27, 2017	1.0% (+0.7)
41	November 3, 2017	1.0% (0)
42	November 10, 2017	1.2% (+0.2)
43	November 17, 2017	0.5% (-0.7)
44	November 24, 2017	0.6% (+0.1)
45	December 8, 2017	0.8% (+0.2)
46	December 15, 2017	0.4% (-0.4)
47	December 22, 2017	0.7% (+0.3)
48	December 29, 2017	0.6% (-0.1)
2018
49	January 5, 2018	0.8% (+0.2)
50	January 12, 2018	0.6% (-0.2)

Note: This show airs on a cable channel/pay TV which normally has a relatively smaller audience compared to free-to-air TV/public broadcasters (KBS, SBS, MBC & EBS).
