= Oh My Ghost Clients =

2025 South Korean television series

- Promotional poster
- Also known as: Labor Attorney Noh Moo-jin
- Hangul: 노무사 노무진
- RR: Nomusa No Mujin
- MR: Nomusa No Mujin
- Genre: Fantasy; Action comedy
- Written by: Kim Bo-tong; Yoo Seung-hee
- Directed by: Yim Soon-rye
- Starring: Jung Kyung-ho; Seol In-ah; Cha Hak-yeon
- Country of origin: South Korea
- Original language: Korean
- No. of episodes: 10

Production
- Executive producers: Yoo Eun-jeong; Lee Kyung-hwan
- Producers: Kim Hyung-ok; Yoo Hyeon-jong; Kim Ji-ha
- Running time: 70 minutes
- Production company: Broccoli Pictures

Original release
- Network: MBC TV
- Release: May 30 – June 28, 2025

Oh My Ghost Clients (Korean: 노무사 노무진) is a 2025 South Korean fantasy action comedy television series starring Jung Kyung-ho, Seol In-ah, and Cha Hak-yeon. It aired on MBC TV from May 30, to June 28, 2025, every Friday and Saturday at 21:50 (KST). It is also streaming on Viu simultaneously in selected regions.

== Synopsis ==
The series follows the story of Noh Moo-jin, a labor attorney who is unexpectedly approached by ghosts and requested to solve their labor problems.

== Cast and characters ==
=== Main ===
- Jung Kyung-ho as Noh Moo-jin (a labor attorney who can see spirits)
- Seol In-ah as Na Hee-joo (the sister-in-law of Moo-jin)
- Cha Hak-yeon as Go Gyeon-woo
- Yoo Seon-ho as Heo Yoon-jae (Diligent part-timer. After returning to life from a coma, he finds hope to live by gaining strength and encouragement from Moo-jin, and decides to pursue a labor attorney license)
- Tang Jun-sang as Bo Sal (Buddha)
- Kyung Soo-jin as Na Mi-joo (the estranged wife of Moo-jin, Hee-joo's older sister)

=== Supporting ===
- Park Soo-oh as Lee Min-wook (Ep. 2 - Student factory worker died in a tragic accident in an illegal factory)
- Hwang Bo-reum-byeol as Jo Eun-young (Ep. 3, 4 - Rookie nurse committed suicide in a hospital as she was unjustly blamed for causing a patient's death)
- Kang Ae-shim as Kim Young-sook (Ep. 5, 6 – Janitor who died of a heart attack while studying for exams inhumanely imposed on janitors by the employer)

=== Guest appearances ===
- Kim Dae-myung as Jung-min (Ep. 1 - a close friend of Moo-jin, who advises Moo-jin to use his retirement money to buy Bit-coins)
- Jun Gook-hyang as Yang Eun-ja (Ep. 1, 5, 6 - Moo-jin's mother, a cleaning worker)
- Jung Soon-won as Yoon Chul (Ep. 1, 8 - Long-time coworker and friend of Moo-jin)
- Kim Kang-hyun as Chul-yong (Ep. 1 - Head of the HR Department at Moo-jin's company)
- Yun Je-wook as Lee Jae-sung (Ep. 1, 2 - Director of an illegal factory)
- Kang Hye-won as Lee Yu-jin (Ep. 2, 8 - Social affairs reporter and former colleague of Gyeon-woo)
- Kim Gwi-sun as Taehyeop Steel President (Ep. 2 - Owner of an illegal factory)
- Anupam Tripathi as Nimal (Ep. 2 - Factory foreign worker)
- Lee Mi-do (Ep. 3 - Shaman who gives Moo-jin a exorcism course)
- Song Young-gyu (Ep. 3 - Church priest whom Moo-jin visits during the exorcism course)
- Ok Ja-yeon as Lee Su-jung (Ep. 3, 4 - Senior nurse who has been under stress and didn't protect Eun-young and felt guilty about it)
- Shin Joo-hyup as Park Hyun-woo (Ep. 3, 4 - Resident doctor incorrectly prescribed KCL and blamed it on Eun-young)
- Lee Chang-min as Jung-yup (Ep. 4 - Eun-young's boyfriend)
- Jin Seon-kyu as Noh Woo-jin (Ep. 5, 10 - Moo-jin's elder brother, a diligent construction worker)
- Ahn Nae-sang as Oh Jang-geun (Ep. 5, 6 – Janitor working in a university)
- Park Won-sang (Ep. 5, 6 - University administrative director in charge of reducing operating costs and personnel)
- Choi Jung-in as Hye-jung (Ep. 7 - Supermarket manager tries to over up Yoon-jae's accident by refuting the claim of a poor working environment)
- Choi Moo-sung as Kim Myung-an (Ep. 8, 9, 10 - CEO of the Myung-eum Construction, villain in the biggest industrial accident)
- Lim Chul-hyung as CEO Choi (Ep. 8, 9 - CEO of the Bukguk Warehouse responsible for the fire)
- Moon So-ri as Moon Jung-eun (Ep. 9, 10 - Big-time National Assembly member)
- Park Hae-il (Ep. 10 - Special voice appearance at the end, mysteriously calling Moo-jin, "Excuse me. Mr. Noh Moo-jin, the labor attorney..")

== Production ==
=== Development ===
The show was directed by Yim Soon-rye. The script was written by Kim Bo-tong and Yoo Seung-hee. The series is planned by Kwon Sung-chang, and produced by Broccoli Pictures.

=== Casting ===
In August 2023, Jung Kyung-ho was reported to have received an offer to appear, and is positively reviewing it. On January 8, 2024, Seol In-ah was reported to be cast as the female lead. On May 14, Cha Hak-yeon had reportedly been cast. On December 19, MBC announced that Jung, Seol, and Cha had confirmed their appearances.

=== Filming ===
Principal photography began in September 2024.

== Release ==
Oh My Ghost Clients premiered on MBC TV on May 30, 2025, and aired every Friday and Saturday at 21:50 (KST).

== Viewership ==
Oh My Ghost Clients : South Korea viewers per episode (thousands)

| Season | Episode number | | | | | | | | | | Average |
| Season | 1 | 2 | 3 | 4 | 5 | 6 | 7 | 8 | 9 | 10 | Average |
|---|---|---|---|---|---|---|---|---|---|---|---|
| 1 | 806 | 580 | 771 | 586 | 1001 | 866 | 1068 | 831 | 953 | 832 | 829 |

Source: Audience measurement performed nationwide by Nielsen Korea.

Average TV viewership ratings
| Ep. | Original broadcast date | Average audience share (Nielsen Korea) | |
| Ep. | Original broadcast date | Nationwide | Seoul |
|---|---|---|---|
| 1 | May 30, 2025 | 4.1% (11th) | 4.5% (10th) |
| 2 | May 31, 2025 | 3.2% (15th) | 3.3% (8th) |
| 3 | June 6, 2025 | 3.9% (13th) | 4.3% (11th) |
| 4 | June 7, 2025 | 2.8% (18th) | 3.2% (11th) |
| 5 | June 13, 2025 | 5.1% (7th) | 5.0% (7th) |
| 6 | June 14, 2025 | 4.6% (6th) | 4.5% (6th) |
| 7 | June 20, 2025 | 5.6% (7th) | 5.4% (6th) |
| 8 | June 21, 2025 | 3.7% (14th) | 3.7% (9th) |
| 9 | June 27, 2025 | 5.1% (7th) | 4.5% (7th) |
| 10 | June 28, 2025 | 4.2% (8th) | 3.9% (7th) |
| Average | | 4.2% | 4.2% |
In the table above, the blue numbers represent the lowest ratings and the red numbers represent the highest ratings.

== Awards and nominations ==
| Year | Award | Category | Recipient | Result | Ref. |
|---|---|---|---|---|---|
| 2025 | 44th MBC Drama Awards | | | | |
| 2025 | 44th MBC Drama Awards | Drama of the Year | Oh My Ghost Clients | Nominated | |
| 2025 | 44th MBC Drama Awards | Grand Prize (Daesang) | Jung Kyung-ho | Nominated | |
| 2025 | 44th MBC Drama Awards | Best Actor Award | Jung Kyung-ho | Won | |
| 2025 | 44th MBC Drama Awards | Top Excellence Award | Jung Kyung-ho | Nominated | |
| 2025 | 44th MBC Drama Awards | Excellence Award, Actor | Cha Hak-yeon | Nominated | |
| 2025 | 44th MBC Drama Awards | Excellence Award, Actress | Seol In-ah | Nominated | |
| 2025 | 44th MBC Drama Awards | Best Supporting Actress | Jun Gook-hyang | Nominated | |
| 2026 | 24th Director's Cut Awards | Best Director (Drama) | Yim Soon-rye | Nominated | |
