= Lee Shin-young =

South Korean actor

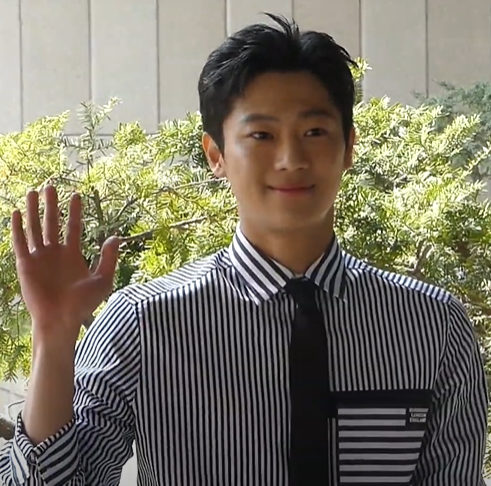
- Lee in April 2020
- Born: January 24, 1998 (age 28); Chilgok County, North Gyeongsang Province, South Korea
- Occupation: Actor
- Years active: 2018–present
- Agent: Forest Entertainment
- Height: 180 cm (5 ft 11 in)

Korean name
- Hangul: 이신영
- RR: I Sinyeong
- MR: I Sinyŏng

Lee Shin-young (born January 24, 1998) is a South Korean model and actor. He rose to fame with the Korean television series Crash Landing on You (2019), How to Buy a Friend (2020), Rookie Cops (2022) and Romantic Doctor (2023).

== Early life ==
Lee was born on January 24, 1998, in South Korea.

== Career ==
=== 2018–present: Acting debut ===
Lee made his acting debut in the web series Just One Bite (2018). He went on to roles in It's Okay To Be Sensitive 2 (2019) and Just One Bite 2 (2019). He played First Lieutenant Park Kwang-beom in the hit drama Crash Landing on You (2019). Lee also starred in the KBS drama How to Buy a Friend (2020) alongside Shin Seung-ho and Rookie Cops (2022) as Kim Tak.

== Filmography ==
=== Film ===
Year	Title	Role	Notes	Ref.
2023	Rebound	Cheon Ki-beom		
2025	Run to You	Kang Seung-yeol		
2025	Tristes Tropiques	Lu		

=== Television series ===
Year	Title	Role	Notes	Ref.
2019–2020	Crash Landing on You	Park Kwang-beom		
2020	How to Buy a Friend	Chan Hong		
2020–2021	Awaken	Jang Ji-wan		
2022	Rookie Cops	Kim Tak		
2023	Dr. Romantic	Jang Dong-hwa	Season 3	
2023	CEO-dol Mart	Choi Ho-rang		
2024	Captivating the King	Kim Myung-ha		
2025	Moon River	Prince Lee Un		

=== Web series ===
Year	Title	Role	Ref.
2018	Just One Bite	Lee Chan-hyuk	
2019	It's Okay To Be Sensitive 2	Seo Min-jun	
2019	Just One Bite 2	Lee Chan-hyuk	
2021	Bite Sisters	Jung Sung-min	

=== Music video appearances ===
Year	Song title	Artist	Ref.
2018	"Love Me Once Again"	Ben	

=== Musical drama ===
Year	Title	Notes	Ref.
2022	Themselves	Three episodes will be produced as a large-scale musical	

== Awards and nominations ==
Name of the award ceremony, year presented, category, nominee of the award, and the result of the nomination
Award ceremony	Year	Category	Nominee / Work	Result	Ref.
Asia Model Awards	2020	Rookie Actor of the Year	Lee Shin-young	Won	
Blue Dragon Film Awards	2023	Best New Actor	Rebound	Nominated	
Buil Film Awards	2023	Best New Actor	Rebound	Nominated	
Grand Bell Awards	2023	Best New Actor	Rebound	Nominated	
KBS Drama Awards	2020	Best Actor in a One-Act/Special/Short Drama	How to Buy a Friend	Won	
MBC Drama Awards	2025	Best New Actor	Moon River	Won	
SBS Drama Awards	2023	Best New Actor	Dr. Romantic 3	Won	
