= Moon River (TV series) =

2025 South Korean television series

- Promotional poster
- Hangul: 이강에는 달이 흐른다
- Lit.: The Moon Flows In This River
- RR: Igangeneun dari heureunda
- MR: Igangenŭn tari hŭrŭnda
- Genre: Historical drama; Fantasy; Romantic comedy; Melodrama
- Written by: Cho Seung-hui
- Directed by: Lee Dong-hyeun
- Starring: Kang Tae-oh; Kim Se-jeong
- Music by: Park Se-joon (CP)
- Country of origin: South Korea
- Original language: Korean
- No. of episodes: 15

Production
- Producers: Han Seok-won; Hwang Gi-yong; Yoon Hong-mi
- Running time: 60 minutes
- Production company: HighZium Studio

Original release
- Network: MBC TV
- Release: November 7 – December 20, 2025

Moon River (Korean: 이강에는 달이 흐른다) is a 2025 South Korean television series starring Kang Tae-oh, and Kim Se-jeong. It aired on MBC TV from November 7, to December 20, 2025, every Friday and Saturday at 21:40 (KST).

The series is also available for streaming on Viu in Singapore, Hong Kong, Thailand, Philippines, Indonesia and Malaysia.

== Synopsis ==
A historical drama about a crown prince who has lost his smile, a peddler who has lost her memory and their inevitable love that spans lifetimes.

== Cast ==
=== Main ===
- Kang Tae-oh as Lee Kang

The crown prince who has lost the love of his life.

- Kim Se-jeong as Park Dal-i

A woman from low social class who lost her memory as an adult.

- Lee Shin-young as Prince Un

Lee Kang's cousin

- Hong Su-zu as Kim Woo-hee

Daughter of Kim Han-chul, love interest of Prince Un, and Lee Kang's betrothed.

- Jin Goo as Kim Han-chul

A man of absolute power who is the "minister-advisor" to the King.

=== Supporting ===
- Kim Nam-hee as Lee Hee
- Kwon Joo-seok as Oh Shin-won
- Han Sang-jo as Yoon Se-dol
- Kim Yoon-bae as Cha Eun-woo
- Park Ah-in as Park Hong-nan
- Kim Ki-hong: Dal-yi's dad
- Park Bo-kyung: Dal-yi's mom
- Choi Deok-moon as Heo Young-gam
- Kim Jung-ki as Minister of Personnel Jag-yeong
- Yang Gi-won as Minister of War Hong Ro
- Nam Gi-ae as Queen Dowager Han
- Ji Il-joo as Do Seung-ji

=== Others ===
- Song Ji-hyun as Yeo-ri
- Tak-i-on as Tak-i
- Yoon Chae-bin as Yeon-sim

== Production ==
The series is directed by Lee Dong-hyeun, whose works include Bitter Sweet Hell (2024), and written by Cho Seung-hui, who wrote More Than Friends (2020). It is produced by High-Zium Studio.

== Release ==
The series was originally scheduled to premiere on October 31. However, it was delayed by a week due to the broadcast of the 2025 Shinhan SOL Bank KBO Playoffs.

On November 13, 2025, MBC announced a change in broadcast time from 21:50 to 21:40 starting from the third episode.

== Viewership ==
Moon River : South Korea viewers per episode (thousands)

Season	Episode number														Average
Season	1	2	3	4	5	6	7	8	9	10	11	12	13	14	Average
1	769	766	1017	801	1052	911	996	1007	1075	950	1017	1085	1152	1260	990

Source: Audience measurement performed nationwide by Nielsen Media Research.

Average TV viewership ratings
Ep.	Original broadcast date	Average audience share (Nielsen Korea)	
Ep.	Original broadcast date	Nationwide	Seoul
1	November 7, 2025	3.8% (13th)	3.7% (13th)
2	November 8, 2025	3.7% (12th)	3.4% (9th)
3	November 14, 2025	5.6% (6th)	5.1% (6th)
4	November 15, 2025	4.1% (8th)	3.7% (6th)
5	November 21, 2025	6.1% (6th)	6.1% (5th)
6	November 22, 2025	5.2% (5th)	5.2% (5th)
7	November 28, 2025	5.5% (9th)	5.3% (9th)
8	November 29, 2025	5.4% (4th)	4.9% (6th)
9	December 5, 2025	6.0% (7th)	5.8% (6th)
10	December 6, 2025	5.3% (4th)	4.9% (5th)
11	December 12, 2025	5.6% (9th)	5.1% (8th)
12	December 13, 2025	5.7% (4th)	5.1% (7th)
13	December 19, 2025	6.4% (5th)	6.1% (3rd)
14	December 20, 2025	6.8% (3rd)	6.4% (3rd)
Average		5.4%	5.1%
Special	October 5, 2025	1.6% (NR)	N/A
In the table above, the blue numbers represent the lowest ratings and the red numbers represent the highest ratings.; N/A denotes ratings that were not published.; NR denotes that the show did not rank in the top 20 daily programs on that date.
