= Mary Kills People (South Korean TV series) =

2025 South Korean TV series

- Promotional poster
- Hangul: 메리 킬즈 피플
- RR: Meri kiljeu pipeul
- MR: Meri k'iljŭ p'ip'ŭl
- Genre: Medical thriller; Black comedy
- Based on: Mary Kills People by Tara Armstrong
- Written by: Lee Soo-ya
- Directed by: Park Joon-woo
- Starring: Lee Bo-young; Lee Min-ki; Kang Ki-young
- Country of origin: South Korea
- Original language: Korean
- No. of episodes: 12

Production
- Executive producers: Sim Woo-jae; Jo Neung-yeon; Park Sang-jin
- Producers: Kim Min-ah; Yoo Jae-hyuk; Shim Se-yoon; Lee Hyeong-gu; Shin Kyung-soo
- Production companies: Mr. Romance Co.; Moving Pictures Co; Studio ANSEILLEN

Original release
- Network: MBC TV
- Release: August 1 – September 12, 2025

Mary Kills People (Korean: 메리 킬즈 피플) is a 2025 South Korean television series written by Lee Soo-ya, directed by Park Joon-woo, and starring Lee Bo-young, Lee Min-ki, and Kang Ki-young. The series is a remake of the 2017 Canadian television series of the same name. It aired on MBC TV from August 1, to September 12, 2025, every Friday and Saturday at 22:00 (KST).

== Premise ==
The drama follows a respected doctor who secretly helps terminally ill patients end their lives, and a detective who begins investigating the mysterious cases, leading to a tense cat-and-mouse dynamic.

== Cast ==
=== Main ===
- Lee Bo-young as Woo So-jung: An experienced emergency physician who secretly performs euthanasia for terminal patients for a price.
- Lee Min-ki as Jo Hyun-woo / Ban Ji-hoon: A brain tumor patient nearing the end of his life.
- Kang Ki-young as Choi Dae-Hyun: A doctor who assists Woo So-jung with the euthanasia cases.

=== Supporting ===
- Kim Tae-woo as Ahn Tae-sung: Chief of the National Police Station
- Baek Hyun-jin as Go Kwang-cheol: a mysterious businessman who carefully conceals his secrets.
- Kwon Hae-hyo as Yang Shin-bo: a hospital director with an exceptional personality.
- Seo Young-hee as Ryu Yi-soo: a competent lawyer and Woo Soo-jung's neighbor.
- Yoon Ga-ae as Nurse Choi Ye-na.
- Yoo Seung-mok as Baek Ui-won.
- Kim Sang-ji as Kim Jae-yeon: So-jung's niece.
- Shim So-young as the head nurse.
- Kang Na-eon as Woo-mi: A high school student.

=== Guest appearances ===
- Lee Yi-kyung
- Lee Sang-yoon as Choi Kang-yoon
- Son Sook
- Park Won-sang

== Production ==
The series is directed by Park Joon-woo, who directed Taxi Driver 1 (2021) and Crash (2024), and written by Lee Soo-ae. It is produced by Mr. Romance Co., Moving Pictures and Studio ANSEILLEN. It is based on the 2017 Canadian drama of the same name.

== Release ==
It was scheduled to premiere on MBC TV in August 2025, and aired every Friday and Saturday at 22:00 (KST).

== Viewership ==
Mary Kills People : South Korea viewers per episode (thousands)

| Season | Episode number | | | | | | | | | | | |
| Season | 1 | 2 | 3 | 4 | 5 | 6 | 7 | 8 | 9 | 10 | 11 | 12 |
|---|---|---|---|---|---|---|---|---|---|---|---|---|
| 1 | 609 | N/A | N/A | N/A | N/A | N/A | N/A | N/A | N/A | N/A | N/A | N/A |

Source: Audience measurement performed nationwide by Nielsen Media Research.

Average TV viewership ratings
| Ep. | Original broadcast date | Average audience share (Nielsen Korea) | |
| Ep. | Original broadcast date | Nationwide | Seoul |
|---|---|---|---|
| 1 | August 1, 2025 | 3.2% (15th) | 3.4% (12th) |
| 2 | August 2, 2025 | 2.1% (28th) | 2.3% (NR) |
| 3 | August 8, 2025 | 1.8% (28th) | —N/a |
| 4 | August 9, 2025 | 1.9% (34th) | —N/a |
| 5 | August 16, 2025 | 1.9% (33rd) | —N/a |
| 6 | August 22, 2025 | 1.8% (28th) | —N/a |
| 7 | August 23, 2025 | 1.6% (36th) | —N/a |
| 8 | August 29, 2025 | 1.4% (36th) | —N/a |
| 9 | August 30, 2025 | 1.4% (41st) | —N/a |
| 10 | September 5, 2025 | 1.1% (36th) | —N/a |
| 11 | September 6, 2025 | 1.1% (48th) | —N/a |
| 12 | September 12, 2025 | 1.2% (33rd) | —N/a |
| Average | | 1.7% | — (Note: Due to multiple unpublished ratings, the exact average rating is unknown.) |
In the table above, the blue numbers represent the lowest ratings and the red numbers represent the highest ratings.; N/A denotes that ratings were not known.; NR denotes that the drama did not rank in the top 20 daily programs on that date.
