= Kim Ha-yeon (actress) =

South Korean actress (born 2010)

- Born: 6 February 2010 (age 16)
- Other name: Kim Ha-yun
- Occupation: Actress
- Years active: 2016–present

Korean name
- Hangul: 김하연
- Hanja: 金河淵
- RR: Gim Hayeon
- MR: Kim Hayŏn

Kim Ha-yeon (Korean: 김하연; born 6 February 2010) is a South Korean teenage actress. She made her acting debut in 2016 and established her by portraying young version of various characters. She is better known for her role in rom-com Fight for My Way (2017) and 2020 film The Singer. She also appeared in films such as: The Preparation (2017) and Kim Ji-young: Born 1982 (2019) among others. In March 2022 she was cast in KBS's daily drama Bravo, My Life.

== Career ==
Kim debuted in 2016 by appearing in small roles in a film and TV series. She was noticed as child actor in 2017 when she was cast in MBC drama Children of the 20th Century, KBS drama Fight for My Way as young Seol-hee, and as Eun-ji in the tvN drama stage The Picnic Day. Later she took on the role of Na-eun in film Romans 8:37 and Mi-sol, the daughter of Moon-kyeong (Yoo Sun) in The Preparation. In 2018 she was cast in a short role in tvN drama Live, as young Han Yeo-reum in Where Stars Land and as Han Yoo-ri in Ms. Ma, Nemesis. Kim also appeared in historical film Rampant in the same year. In 2019 she was seen in film Kim Ji-young: Born 1982, which was a commercial success with 3.67 million persons watching it.

In 2020 she was nominated for Best Young Actress in 2020 KBS Drama Awards for her role as Jeong Byo-ri in No Matter What.

In 2021, Kim was made Goo-Kee Friends ambassadors for the 9th Seoul Guro International Children's Film Festival along with Krystal Jung.

== Filmography ==
=== Films ===
Year	Title	Role	Notes	Ref.
2016	The Great Actor	Kindergartener		
2016	Yongsoon	Young Yong-soon		
2017	The Preparation	Mi-sol		
2017	Romans 8:37	Na-eun		
2018	The Pension	Chae-eun		
2018	Rampant	Princess, crown prince So-won's daughter		
2019	Kim Ji-young: Born 1982	12 year old Ji-yeong		
2020	The Singer	Cheong-yi		

=== Television series ===
Year	Title	Role	Network	Notes	Ref.
2016	My Little Baby	Eun-ae, Cha Jeong-han's daughter	MBC		
2017	Fight for My Way	Young Baek Seol-hee	KBS2		
2017	Children of the 20th Century	Young Sa Jin-jin	MBC		
2017	Drama Stage: "The Picnic Day"	Eun-ji	tvN	Season 1	
2018	Live	Seul-gi	tvN		
2018	Where Stars Land	Young Han Yeo-reum	SBS TV		
2018	Ms. Ma, Nemesis	Han Yoo-ri	SBS TV		
2020	My Holo Love	Young So-yeon	Netflix		
2020	No Matter What	Jeong byori	KBS		
2020	Memorials	Young Koo Se-ra	KBS2		
2021-22	Uncle	Ye So-dam	TV Chosun		
2022	Bravo, My Life	Seo Hye-na	KBS1		

== Awards and nominations ==
Name of the award ceremony, year presented, category, nominee of the award, and the result of the nomination
Award ceremony	Year	Category	Nominee / Work	Result	Ref.
KBS Drama Awards	2020	Best Young Actress	No Matter What	Nominated	
KBS Drama Awards	2022	Best Young Actress	Bravo, My Life	Nominated	
