= 2020 KBS Drama Awards =

34th edition of award ceremony

- Date: 31 December 2020
- Site: KBS Hall, Yeouido, Seoul
- Hosted by: Do Kyung-wan; Jo Bo-ah; Kim Kang-hoon (part 1); Lee Sang-yeob (part 2)
- Official website: KBS Drama Awards

Highlights
- Grand Prize (Daesang): Chun Ho-jin
- Lifetime achievement: Late Song Jae-ho
- Most awards: 15 for Once Again

Television coverage
- Network: KBS2, KBS World
- Ratings: 4.3% (nationwide)

The 2020 KBS Drama Awards, presented by Korean Broadcasting System (KBS), was held on 31 December 2020 at KBS Hall in Yeouido, Seoul. It was hosted by Jo Bo-ah, Lee Sang-yeob, Kim Kang-hoon and Do Kyung-wan. Considering the resurgence of COVID-19, the show was held without on-site audience. The show aired on 31 December at 20:30 (KST).

== Winners and nominees ==
(Winners denoted in bold)

Grand Prize (Daesang)	Special Lifetime Achievement Award
**Cheon Ho-jin – Once Again**	**Late Song Jae-ho**
Top Excellence Award, Actor	Top Excellence Award, Actress
**Jeong Bo-seok – Homemade Love Story**; **Park In-hwan – Brilliant Heritage**; Cheon Ho-jin – Once Again; Park Hae-jin – Forest; Shin Ha-kyun – Soul Mechanic	**Lee Min-jung – Once Again**; Cha Hwa-yeon – Once Again; Cho Yeo-jeong – Cheat on Me If You Can; Hwang Jung-eum – Men Are Men; Jeon In-hwa – Homemade Love Story
Excellence Award, Actor in a Miniseries	Excellence Award, Actress in a Miniseries
**Lee Jae-wook – Do Do Sol Sol La La Sol**; **Park Sung-hoon – Memorials**; Choi Jin-hyuk – Zombie Detective; Go Jun – Cheat on Me If You Can; Kim Myung-soo – Welcome; Park Hae-jin – Forest; Shin Ha-kyun – Soul Mechanic	**Cho Yeo-jeong – Cheat on Me If You Can**; **Nana – Memorials**; Go Ara – Do Do Sol Sol La La Sol; Hwang Jung-eum – Men Are Men; Jin Se-yeon – Born Again; Jo Bo-ah – Forest; Jung So-min – Soul Mechanic
Excellence Award, Actor in a Serial Drama	Excellence Award, Actress in a Serial Drama
**Lee Jang-woo – Homemade Love Story**; **Lee Sang-yeob – Once Again**; Chun Ho-jin – Once Again; Jeong Bo-seok – Homemade Love Story	**Jin Ki-joo – Homemade Love Story**; **Lee Jung-eun – Once Again**; Lee Min-jung – Once Again; Jeon In-hwa – Homemade Love Story; Cha Hwa-yeon – Once Again; Hwang Shin-hye – Homemade Love Story
Excellence Award, Actor in a Daily Drama	Excellence Award, Actress in a Daily Drama
**Kang Eun-tak – Man in a Veil**; **Kim Yu-seok – No Matter What**; Go Se-won – Fatal Promise; Kang Sung-min – Fatal Promise; Park In-hwan – Brilliant Heritage; Shin Jung-yoon – Brilliant Heritage	**Park Ha-na – Fatal Promise**; **Lee Chae-young – Man in a Veil**; Do Ji-won – Brilliant Heritage; Kang Se-jung – Brilliant Heritage; Na Hye-mi – No Matter What
Best Supporting Actor	Best Supporting Actress
**Ahn Gil-kang – Memorials, Once Again**; **Oh Dae-hwan – Once Again**; In Gyo-jin – Homemade Love Story; Jung Sang-hoon – Cheat on Me If You Can; Kim Joo-hun – Do Do Sol Sol La La Sol, Drama Special – Traces of Love; Tae In-ho – Soul Mechanic	**Kim Sun-young – Homemade Love Story**; **Oh Yoon-ah – Once Again**; **Ye Ji-won – Do Do Sol Sol La La Sol**; Baek Ji-won – How to Buy a Friend, Once Again; Hong Soo-hyun – Cheat on Me If You Can; Hwang Young-hee – Men Are Men; Jang Hye-jin – How to Buy a Friend, Memorials
Best Actor in a One-Act/Special/Short Drama	Best Actress in a One-Act/Special/Short Drama
**Lee Han-wi – Drama Special – My Lilac**; **Lee Shin-young – How to Buy a Friend**; Kim Dae-geon (actor) - Drama Special – My Teacher; Kim Sung-cheol - Drama Special – One Night; Shin Seung-ho – How to Buy a Friend; Oh Min-suk - Drama Special – The Pleasures and Sorrows of Work; Lee Sang-yeob - Drama Special – Traces of Love	**Lee Yoo-young – Drama Special – Traces of Love**; **Son Sook – Drama Special – A Jaunt**; Go Min-si - Drama Special – The Reason Why I Can't Tell You; Jin Ji-hee - Drama Special – Modern Girl; Ko Won-hee - Drama Special – The Pleasures and Sorrows of Work; Yoon Se-ah - Drama Special – Crevasse
Best Young Actor	Best Young Actress
**Moon Woo-jin** – **Once Again**; Choi Go – Memorials; Seo Woo-jin – Man in a Veil; Song Min-jae – Welcome, Once Again, Do Do Sol Sol La La Sol; Sung Min-joon – Zombie Detective	**Lee Ga-yeon** – **Once Again**; Ahn Seo-yeon – Once Again; Joo Ye-rim – Men Are Men; Kim Vi-ju – Brilliant Heritage; Kim Ha-yeon – Memorials, No Matter What
Best New Actor	Best New Actress
**Lee Sang-yi – Once Again**; **Seo Ji-hoon – Men Are Men**; Kim Young-dae – Cheat on Me If You Can; Oh Dong-min – Memorials; Ryeoun – Homemade Love Story	**Bona – Homemade Love Story**; **Lee Cho-hee – Once Again**; **Shin Ye-eun – Welcome**; Jung Min-ah – No Matter What; Kang Mal-geum - Drama Special – The Pleasures and Sorrows of Work; Kim So-hye – How to Buy a Friend; Park Ju-hyun – Zombie Detective
Netizen Award, Actor	Netizen Award, Actress
**Kim Young-dae – Cheat on Me If You Can**; **Lee Sang-yeob – Once Again**	**Jo Bo-ah – Forest**
Best Couple Award	Best Writer
**Lee Jang-woo, Jin Ki-joo & Jeong Bo-seok – Homemade Love Story**; **Park Sung-hoon & Nana – Memorials**; **Cho Yeo-jeong & Go Jun – Cheat on Me If You Can**; **Park Hae-jin & Jo Bo-ah – Forest**; **Lee Sang-yi & Lee Cho-hee – Once Again**; **Cheon Ho-jin & Lee Jung-eun – Once Again**; **Lee Sang-yeob & Lee Min-jung – Once Again**	**Yang Hee-seung (screenwriter) – Once Again**

== Presenters ==
Order of the presentation, name of the presenter, and the award they presented
Order	Presenter	Presented
1	Park Da-yeon, Joo Ye-rim	Best Young Actor/Actress
2	Kim Myung-soo and Kwon Na-ra	Best New Actor/Actress
3	Kim Young-kwang and Choi Kang-hee	Netizen Award
4	Lee Do-hyun and Jeon Hye-bin	Best Actor/Actress in a One-Act/Special/Short Drama
5	Kim Byung-chul and Shin Dong-mi	Best Supporting Actor/Actress
6	Park In-hwan and Cho Yeo-jeong	Special Lifetime Achievement Award
7	Lee Geon-joon (Chief of KBS Drama Center) and Lee Min-jung	Best Writer
8	Oh Min-suk and Seol In-ah	Excellence Award in a Serial Drama
9	Seol Jung-hwan and Cha Ye-ryun	Excellence Award in a Daily Drama
10	Jang Dong-yoon and Kim So-hyun	Excellence Award in a Miniseries
11	Kang Ha-neul	Top Excellence Award
12	Yang Seung-dong	Grand Prize (Daesang)

== Special performances ==
Order of the presentation, name of the artist, and the song(s) they performed
Order	Artist	Performed
1	Jung Yong-hwa feat. Brillante Children's Choir and Kim Kang-hoon	"Spring Breeze" (봄바람) (Once Again OST)
1	CNBLUE	"Then, Now, and Forever" (과거 현재 미래)
2	Lee Han-wi feat. Na Tae-joo	"I'm Sorry Sorry" (쏘리 쏘리해) (My Lilac OST)
3	ADG7 feat. Lee Sang-yi and Dokteuk Crew	"Taking You to Us" (모십니다)
3	ADG7 feat. Dokteuk Crew	"Aucha" (어차)

== See also ==
- 2020 SBS Drama Awards
- 2020 MBC Drama Awards
- 7th APAN Star Awards
