= Ki Do-hoon =

South Korean actor (born 1995)

Ki Do-hun
- 기도훈
- Born: April 5, 1995 (age 31); Gwangju, South Korea
- Occupations: Actor; model
- Years active: 2015–present
- Agent: ForStar Company (2021–present)

Korean name
- Hangul: 기도훈
- RR: Gi Dohun
- MR: Ki Tohun
- Website: Official website

Ki Do-hun (Korean: 기도훈; born April 5, 1995) is a South Korean actor and model He is best known for his appearance in the Korean Television Series Arthdal Chronicles (2019), and Once Again (2020)

== Early life and career ==
Ki was born on April 4, 1995, in Gwangju. He studied at Chungang University.

Ki Do-hoon began his career as model under model agency ESteem.

Ki made his first onscreen appearance in the 2015 movie C'est si bon.

In August 2016, Ki were recruit as actors by SM Entertainment, following his past agency ESteem partnership with SM.

In December 2016, Ki was confirmed to cast in MBC's upcoming historical drama The King in Love as the character Jang-eui, a 'shadow guards' who secretly protect crown prince 'Wang Won'.

In August 2018, Ki was confirmed to cast in MBC's drama Dae Jang-Geum is Watching.

In May 2019, Ki has been confirmed to cast in tvN's upcoming drama Arthdal Chronicles as the character Yangcha, the youngest member of the Daekan unit and a mysterious character who always wears a mask.

In January 2020, Ki starred in KBS2's weekend drama Once Again.

In December 2020, Ki confirmed to cast as the male lead in upcoming web drama Scripting Your Destiny.

In March 2021, Ki was cast in Netflix's original series Love Alarm 2 as the character Brian Cheon, a 'Love Alarm' application developer and currently the CTO of 'Love Alarm' C&C.

In September 2021, Do-hoon signed an exclusive contract with ForStar Company.

== Filmography ==
=== Film ===
Year	Title	Role	Notes	Ref.
2015	C'est si bon	Kim Se-hwan		

=== Television series ===
Year	Title	Role	Notes	Ref.
2016	The Success Story of Novice Shaman Gong	Nam Seong-hyun		
2017	KBS Drama Special: Slow	Jung Hee-min		
2017	The King in Love	Jang Ui		
2018	Should We Kiss First?	Yeo Ha-min		
2018	Dae Jang Geum Is Watching	convenience store customer		
2019	Arthdal Chronicles	Yang Cha		
2019	Catch the Ghost	Kim Woo-hyuk		
2020	Once Again	Park Hyo-shin		
2021	Love Alarm	Brian Cheon		
2021	Scripting Your Destiny	Shin Ho-yoon	Season 2	
2022	Jinxed at First	Seon Min-joon		
2023	Queenmaker	Yoon Dong-joo		

=== Variety show ===
Year	Title	Notes	Ref.
2020	Law of the Jungle in Zero Point	Cast member with Kim Byung-man, Heo Kyung-hwan, Gary (rapper), Lee Seung-yoon, Pak Se-ri, Yoon Eun-hye	
2020	Knowing Bros (Ep. 248)	Guest with Oh Yoon-ah, Lee Cho-hee, Lee Sang-yi	
2022	2 Days & 1 Night (S4 ep. 141–143)	Guest with Shin Ji, Jung Seung-hwan, Jo Han-sun, and Lee Si-eon	
