= Kang Yu-mi =

Kang Yu-mi may refer to:

- Kang Yu-mi (footballer), South Korean footballer
- Kang Yu-mi (comedian), South Korean comedian
