= Gag Concert =

South Korean television comedy show

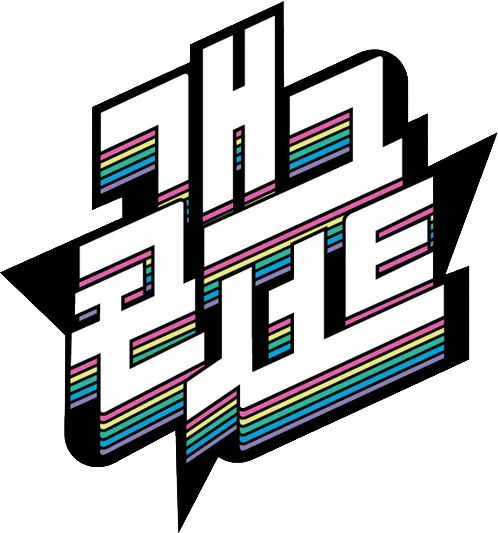
- Genre: Sketch comedy
- Created by: KBS Entertainment Production
- Written by: Choi Seong-hye, Jang Jong-won, Yoon Ki-yeong, Yoo Sol, Kang Hye-rim, Yoo Ye-ri, Kang Ko-eun, Oh Hye-bin
- Directed by: Lee Jae-woo
- Starring: See below
- Theme music composer: Lee Tae-seon Band
- Opening theme: One in A Million – Pet Shop Boys
- Ending theme: Part Time Lover – Stevie Wonder
- Country of origin: South Korea
- Original language: Korean
- No. of seasons: 2
- No. of episodes: 1055

Production
- Production location: South Korea
- Camera setup: Multicamera setup
- Running time: approx. 80 minutes per episode
- Production company: KBS Entertainment Production

Original release
- Network: KBS 2TV, KBS World TV
- Release: September 4, 1999

Gag Concert (Korean: 개그콘서트) is a South Korean sketch-comedy television show more commonly known as Gag Con (개콘). It began airing on 4 September 1999 and aired its last episode on 26 June 2020, making it South Korea's longest-running comedy show. It started airing again on November 12, 2023, after 3 years and 4 months of absence.

The show was recorded on Wednesdays and aired on KBS 2TV on Sundays at 9:15 pm. It now airs on Sundays at 10:25 pm. The show airs with English subtitles two weeks after it airs on KBS World TV on Saturdays at 6:00 pm.

== Comedians and their classes ==
Comedians and their classes

1st class (1982)

- Shim Hyeong-rae

2nd class (1984)

- Kim Mi-hwa

7th class (1991)

- Yoo Jae-suk (National MC)
- Kim Gook-jin
- Park Soo-hong
- Nam Hui-suk

10th class (1994)

- Jang Ung
- Ji Suk-jin
- Song Eun-i
- Jo Hye-ryun

12th class (1995)

- Kim Sook

13th class (1997)

- Park Seong-ho
- Park Jun-hyeong (married to Kim Ji-hye)
- Im Hyeok-pil

14th class (1999)

- Kim Dae-hui
- Kim Jun-ho
- Kim Ji-hye (married to Park Junhyeong)
- Kim Yeong-cheol

15th class (2000)

- Jeong Jong-cheol
- Jo Su-won

16th class (2001)

- Kim In-seok
- Kim Ki-su
- Kim Si-deok
- Yun Seung-ho
- Lee Jae-hun
- Eom Tae-gyeong
- Jeong Myeong-hun
- Choi Hui-seon
- Heo Seung-jae

17th class (2002)

- Kim Byung-man
- Lee Jeong-su
- Jeong Hyeong-don

18th class (2003)

- Kang Ju-hui
- Kim Jin-cheol
- Ryu Dam
- Seo Nam-yong
- Oh Ji-heon
- Jang Dong-hyeok
- Lee Su-geun

19th class (2004)

- Ahn Yeong-mi
- Kang Yu-mi
- Ahn Sang-tae
- Yu Sang-mu
- Yoo Se-yoon
- Jang Dong-min
- Hong In-gyu
- Hwang Hyeon-hui

20th class (2005)

- Kim Jae-wook
- Noh Woo-jin
- Park Hwi-sun
- Byeon Ki-su
- Byeon Seung-yun
- Shin Go-eun
- Shin Bong-seon
- Yoo Min-sang
- Yoon Hyeong-bin (married to Jeong Gyeong-mi)
- Lee Dong-yoon
- Lee Sang-gu
- Lee Jong-hun
- Jeong Gyeong-mi (married to Yoon Hyeong-bin)
- Jo Ji-hun

21st class (2006)

- Kwon Jae-kwan (married to Kim Kyeong-ah)
- Kim Kyeong-ah (married to Kwon Jae-kwan)
- Kim Ki-yeol
- Kim Ji-min
- Park Na-rae
- Song Byeong-cheol
- Ahn Il-gwon
- Lee Sang-min
- Lee Sang-ho
- Han Min-gwan
- Hong Sun-mok

22nd class (2007)

- Kim Jun-hyeon
- Kim Ji-ho
- Park Seong-kwang
- Park Yeong-jin
- Park Ji-sun
- Song Jun-geun
- Yang Sang-guk
- Yang Seon-il
- Lee Won-gu
- Lee Gwang-seop
- Jang Do-yeon
- Jang Hyo-in
- Jeong Beom-gyun
- Jo Yun-ho
- Choi Hyo-jong
- Heo Kyung-hwan

23rd class (2008)

- Kim Dae-seong
- Kim Min-kyeong
- Kim Hui-won
- Ryu Jeong-nam
- Park So-yeong
- Oh Na-mi
- Jeong Tae-ho
- Heo Min

24th class (2009)

- Kim Seong-ung
- Kim Seong-won
- Ryu Geun-ji
- Ahn So-mi
- Lee Jo-won
- Heo An-na (Anna)

25th class (2010)

- Kwon Mijin
- Kim Ki-ri
- Kim Yeong-hui
- Kim Jang-gun
- Song Yeong-gil
- Shin Bo-ra
- Shin Jong-ryeong
- Lee Sung-dong
- Lee Hui-gyeong
- Jang Ki-yeong
- Jeong Eun-seon
- Jeong Ji-min

26th class (2011)

- Kim Soo-yeong
- Kim Tae-won
- Kim Hye-seon
- Kim Jeong-hun
- Park So-ra
- Seo Tae-hun
- Lee Mun-jae
- Lee Sang-hun
- Im Woo-il
- Jeong Seung-hwan
- Jeong Jin-yeong
- Jeong Hae-cheol
- Hong Na-yeong

27th class (2012)

- Kwak Beom
- Kim Hoe-kyeong
- Namgung Gyeong-ho
- Park Eun-yeong
- Song Pil-geun
- Yoo In-seok
- Lee Su-ji
- Lee Chan
- Jeong Chang-min

28th class (2013)

- Kim Na-hui
- Bok Hyeon-gyu
- Jo Soo-yeon
- Hong Ye-seul
- Hwang Shin-yeong
- Yoon Han-min
- Kim Byeong-seon

29th class (2014)

- Kim Ni-na
- Kim Seung-hye
- Park Bo-mi
- Lee Chang-ho
- Lee Sang-eun
- Lee Se-jin
- Lee Hyeon-jeong
- Im Jong-hyeok
- Choi Jaewon

30th class (2015)

- Kim Min-hui
- Kim Won-hun
- Shim Mun-gyu
- Song Jae-in
- Lee Chang-yoo
- Jang Ha-na
- Jo Chung-hyeon
- Hong Seong-hyeon

31st class (2016)

- Bang Ju-ho
- Bae Jeong-geun
- Park Jin-ho
- Son Byeol-i
- Lee Seung-hwan
- Im Seong-uk
- Jo Rae-hun
- Jo Jin-se
- Choi Hui-ryeong
- Hwang Jeong-hye

32nd class (2018)

- Kim Doo-hyeon
- Min Seong-jun
- Park Dae-seung
- Song I-ji
- Uhm Ji-yoon
- Lee Ka-eun
- Lee Jae-yool
- Lee Jeong-in
- Jang Jun-hui
- Jeon Soo-hui
- Jeong Jin-ha

33rd class (2023)

- Kim Si-u
- Na Hyun-young
- Nam Hyeon-seung
- Seo A-reum
- Oh Min-woo
- Oh Jeong-yul
- Lee Su-gyeong
- Im Seon-yang
- Im Seul-gi
- Jang Hyeon-wook
- Chae Hyo-ryeong
- Choi Gi-mun
- Hwang Eun-bi

== Awards ==
=== KBS Entertainment Awards ===
Each year, comedians are awarded for their performance in Gag Concert in three categories: Best Newcomer, Excellence Award, and Top Excellence. The best skit idea is awarded with "Top Excellence Award for Idea".

Year	Best Newcomer Award	Excellence Award	Top Excellence Award	Top Excellence Award for Idea
2002	Lee Jeongsoo	–	Kang Seongbeom; Park Junhyeong	Survival Dialect
2003	Jeong Hyeongdon; Seo Namyong; Kwon Jinyeong; Kim Darae	Im Hyeokpil	Jeong Yongcheol	Do Re Mi Trio
2004	Kang Yumi; Ahn Sang-tae; Jeong Chulgyu	Jeong Hyeongdon	Park Seongho	Flash Shopping
2005	Yu Seyun; Park Hwisun; An Yeongmi; Shin Bongseon	Jang Dongmin; Kim Hyeonsuk	Kim Junho	Family's Love
2006	Ahn Ilgwon (Male); Kim Jimin (Female)	Kim Daebeom (Male); Kang Yumi (Female)	Jeong Jongcheol	Mappagi
2007	Kim Wonhyo (Male); Park Jiseon (Female)	Byeon Kisoo (Male); Shin Bongsun (Female)	Kim Daehui	We Need Communication
2008	Park Seong-kwang (Male); Kim Kyeong-ah (Female)	Hwang Hyeonhui (Male); Park Jisun (Female)	Kim Byungman	Master Show
2009	Heo Kyung-hwan (Male); Oh Nami (Female)	Yun Hyeongbin (Male); Kang Yumi; An Yeongmi (Female)	Park Seongho	Teacher Kang's Dressing Room
2010	Choi Hyojong (Male); Kim Yeonghui (Female)	Park Yeongjin (Male); Heo Anna (Female)	Kim Byeongman (Male); Park Jiseon (Female)	Double Debate
2011	Jeong Taeho (Male); Lee Huigyeong (Female)	Kim Wonhyo; Choi Hyojong (Male); Shin Bora (Female)	Kim Junho (Male); Jeong Gyungmi (Female)	Solutions to Iffy Issues
2012	Kim Kiri (Male); Park Soyeong (Female)	Heo Kyung-hwan; Jeong Taeho (Male); Kim Jimin (Female)	Kim Junhyeon (Male); Shin Bora (Female)	Brave Guys
2013	Lee Munjae (Male); Ahn Somi (Female)	Yu Minsang (Male); Kim Minkyeong (Female)	Kim Junhyeon (Male); Kim Jimin (Female)	The Yellow Sea
2014	Song Pilgeun (Male); Lee Suji (Female)	Jo Yunho (Male); Heo Anna (Female)	Kim Daehui (Male); Kim Yeonghui (Female)	Late Love
2015	Lee Sejin (Male); Lee Hyeonjeong (Female)	Lee Sanghun (Male); Lee Suji (Female)	Yu Minsang (Male); Kim Minkyeong (Female)	Minsang Debate
2016	Hong Hyeonho (Male); Kim Seunghye (Female)	Song Yeonggil (Male); Lee Hyeonjeong (Female)	Yu Minsang (Male); Lee Suji (Female)	The Most Sensitive People
2018	Lee Seung-hwan (Male); Kim Ni-na (Female)	Song Joon-geun (Male); Park So-ra (Female)	Kwon Jae-kwan (Male); Shin Bong-sun (Female)	Refreshing Statements

=== Other awards ===
Year	Award	Category	Nominee	Result
2007	43rd Baeksang Arts Awards	Best Variety Performer – Male	Jeong Jong-cheol	Won
2007	43rd Baeksang Arts Awards	Best Variety Performer – Male	Jo Won-seok	Nominated
2007	43rd Baeksang Arts Awards	Best Variety Performer – Male	Yoo Se-yoon	Nominated
2007	43rd Baeksang Arts Awards	Best Variety Performer – Female	Kim Mi-ryeo	Won
2007	43rd Baeksang Arts Awards	Best Variety Performer – Female	Kang Yu-mi	Nominated
2009	45th Baeksang Arts Awards	Best Entertainment Program	Gag Concert	Won
2009	45th Baeksang Arts Awards	Best Variety Performer – Male	Kim Byung-man	Won
2010	46th Baeksang Arts Awards	Best Variety Performer – Male	Park Seong-ho	Won
2010	46th Baeksang Arts Awards	Best Variety Performer – Female	Kang Yu-mi	Won
2010	46th Baeksang Arts Awards	Best Variety Performer – Female	Ahn Young-mi	Won
2012	48th Baeksang Arts Awards	Best Entertainment Program	Gag Concert	Won
2012	48th Baeksang Arts Awards	Best Variety Performer – Male	Kim Jun-hyun	Won
2013	49th Baeksang Arts Awards	Best Variety Performer – Female	Shin Bo-ra	Won
2014	50th Baeksang Arts Awards	Best Variety Performer – Female	Kim Young-hee	Won
2015	51st Baeksang Arts Awards	Best Variety Performer – Female	Heo Anna	Nominated
2016	52nd Baeksang Arts Awards	Best Variety Performer – Female	Oh Na-mi	Nominated
2017	53rd Baeksang Arts Awards	Best Variety Performer – Male	Yu Min-sang	Nominated
2017	53rd Baeksang Arts Awards	Best Variety Performer – Female	Lee Su-ji	Nominated
2018	54th Baeksang Arts Awards	Best Variety Performer – Female	Lee Su-ji	Nominated
2018	54th Baeksang Arts Awards	Best Variety Performer – Female	Kang Yu-mi	Nominated
