= Kim Hye-seon =

South Korean comedian (born 1983)

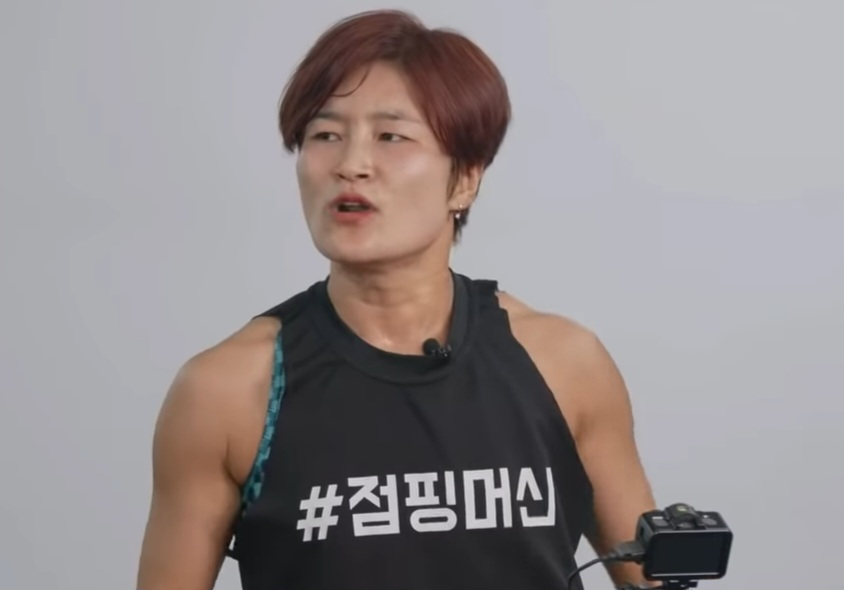
- Kim in 2021
- Born: 1983 (age 41–42)
- Medium: Television
- Spouse: Stefan Siegel (m. 2018)
- Notable works and roles: Gag Concert ("She, The Ultimate Weapon", "War on Television", "Daddy's Girl")

Kim Hye-seon (Korean: 김혜선; born 1983) is a South Korean comedian. Debuting in 2011 through KBS's open recruitment program, she became famous for the stunts she showed off on the comedy program Gag Concert.

== Early life ==
Kim Hye-seon was born in 1983. At 20 years old, she moved from Gunsan, North Jeolla Province, to Seoul in hopes of becoming a backup dancer but later changed her aspiration to becoming a comedian. Wanting to differentiate herself, she exercised and attended Seoul Action School.

== Career ==
Kim started her career in 2011 through KBS's open audition system, as one of the channel's 26th generation comedians. Her first Gag Concert role was as a "super strength girl" in "Superstar KBS", which Kim herself described as a cute role; the part was repeatedly edited out after two broadcasts. In 2011, she took the role of a substitute actress in "She, The Ultimate Weapon", which was based on a skit she had shown off when first auditioning for KBS. Kim did not have any lines during it. Her role, where she demonstrated feats of strength while taking over scenes for a top actress, drew comparisons to Kim Byung-man, and she was dubbed "the female master" (referring to Kim Byung-man's character in Gag Concert's "The Master"). Originally, the feats she showed off were more strenuous, but at the worries of her peers she "lowered the level to fit for broadcast". Kim sustained many injuries while "She, The Ultimate Weapon" ran; she stated in an interview with TV Daily that she had once went to the hospital before a recording.

Kim's next role after "She, The Ultimate Weapon" was in "War on Broadcasting", a parody of the film Nameless Gangster: Rules of the Time. Cast when the sketch was just being finished, she dressed as a man and played a parody of Kim Sung-kyun's character. Afterwards, she appeared in sketches such as "Wait, Wolf", "Bboom Entertainment", and "Daddy's Girl". Her role in the sketch "Drunken" was a change to a more feminine and sexy image; in it, she wore a dress and donned long hair.

In October 2014, it was revealed that Kim had left to Germany after wrapping up a Gag Concert segment. In an appearance on Radio Star, she stated that she went to Germany "in order to die", dissatisfied with her "menacing" image. While in the country, a friend introduced her to Stefan Siegel, whom she would marry in 2018.

== Filmography ==
=== Television shows ===
- Gag Concert
- 수상한 인력소
- Kick a Goal

=== Television series ===
- Zombie Detective (2020); cameo
