= Cheat on Me If You Can =

2020 South Korean comedy mystery TV series

- Promotional poster
- Also known as: Cheat on Me, If You Can
- Hangul: 바람피면 죽는다
- Lit.: If You Cheat, You Die
- RR: Barampimyeon jungneunda
- MR: Paramp'imyŏn chungnŭnda
- Genre: Comedy; Thriller; Romance
- Created by: KBS Drama Production
- Written by: Lee Seong-min
- Directed by: Kim Hyung-seok
- Starring: Cho Yeo-jeong; Go Jun; Kim Young-dae; Yeonwoo
- Country of origin: South Korea
- Original language: Korean
- No. of episodes: 16

Production
- Executive producer: Sanghoon Noh
- Producer: Lee Sang-baek
- Camera setup: Single-camera
- Running time: 70 minutes
- Production company: AStory

Original release
- Network: KBS2
- Release: December 2, 2020 – January 28, 2021

Cheat on Me If You Can (Korean: 바람피면 죽는다) is a South Korean television series starring Cho Yeo-jeong, Go Jun, Yeonwoo, Kim Young-dae and Kim Ye-won. The series directed by Kim Hyung-seok and written by Lee Seong-min follows an unconventional and intense story about Kang Yeo-joo, a novelist who wrote a memorandum to her husband Han Woo-sung, a divorce lawyer, stating, "If You Cheat, You Die". It aired on KBS2 from December 2, 2020 to January 28, 2021 on Wednesdays and Thursdays at 21:30 (KST).

== Synopsis ==
A comical mystery thriller between a divorce lawyer and his wife, a criminal novelist who only thinks about how to kill people. She wrote a memorandum stating, "If you cheat, you die".

== Cast ==
=== Main ===
- Cho Yeo-jeong as Kang Yeo-joo, author of a few best-selling mystery novels, known for her writing style. She usually ends her stories by finishing off her immoral male characters for being unfaithful. So she is dubbed the "Praying Mantis".
- Ko Jun as Han Woo-sung, husband of Yeo-joo, a divorce lawyer who is passionate and emotionally involved with his job.
- Kim Young-dae as Cha Soo-ho, a part-time worker at a convenience store, who is actually an agent of the National Intelligence Service.
- Yeonwoo as Go Mi-rae, a college student who looks innocent but deep inside, carries a complicated personality.

=== Supporting ===
==== People around Yeo-joo and Woo-sung ====
- Song Ok-sook as Yeom Jin-ok, a professional house-keeper working at Yeo-joo and Woo-sung's house
- Na Young-hee as Han Woo-sung's mother
- Jung Sang-hoon as Son Jin-ho, Han Woo-sung's best friend and secretary of the lawyer's office.
- Lee Se-na as Min Yoon-hui, Jin-ho's wife
- Kim Ji-hoon as Son Dong-ho, Jin-ho's son

==== Seodong Police Station ====
- Lee Si-eon as Jang Seung-chul, an experienced homicide detective
- Kim Ye-won as Ahn Se-jin, the only female detective in the violent crimes department
- Lee Tae-hyung as Hong Sung-wan, team leader

==== Broadcast stations ====
- Hong Soo-hyun as Baek Soo-jung
- Gong Sang-ah as Oh Hyun-jung, the PD in-charge of the morning information program
- Yoo Jun-hong as Kim Deok-gi, Baek Soo-jeong's manager

==== The O Ville Publishing Company ====
- Kim Soo-jin as Yang Jin-sun, a representative of the publishing House
- Song Seung-ha as Na Yoo-ri

=== Others ===
- Oh Min-suk as Ma Dong-kyun, Director of the National Intelligence Service
- Bae Noo-ri as Eom Ji-eun, NIS agent
- Kim Do-hyun as Nam Gi-ryong, Korea's leading political consultant
- Han Soo-yeon as Park Hye-kyeong, Woo-sung's rival lawyer
- Choi Jung-woo as Go Mi-rae's friend
- Jeon Soo-kyeong as Yoon Hyeong-suk, Kang Yeo-joo's step-mother
- Yoo So-young as Jogger
- Kim Jeong-pal as Bae Jung-shik, the apartment manager
- Kim Gwang-sub as Green Ivy member

== Production ==
The series, also known as You Cheat, You Die, You're Dead If You Cheat, and If I Cheat, I Die, is directed by Kim Hyoung-seok and written by Lee Sung-min. In July 2020, Go Jun was confirmed to play the lead role. Bae Noo-ri was confirmed in August 2020. The first reading of the script was held in August 2020.

On August 22, KBS announced that in an emergency meeting they decided to stop production. The filming of the series would stop to prevent the cast and crew to become infected with COVID-19, as new outbreaks of the disease were reported. On October 13, first look poster and first air date was officially announced. The drama's first poster apparently purported to show an important clue, as it shows a document inside a plastic bag taped shut at the scene of a crime. The document is stained with blood and reads, "If Han Woo-sung has an affair with another person after he has married Kang Yeo-joo, Kang Yeo-joo will have all the rights to Han Woo-sung's body."

Episode 8 did not air on Thursday, December 24, 2020 to allow the airing of the 2020 KBS Entertainment Awards.

Episode 9 did not air on Thursday, December 31, 2020 to allow the airing of the 2020 KBS Drama Awards. It aired on Wednesday, January 6, 2021.

== Original soundtrack ==
Cheat on Me If You Can

Soundtrack album by Various Artists
- Released: 2020-21
- Genre: Soundtrack
- Languages: Korean; English
- Labels: AStory; Dreamus Company

=== Part 1 ===
Released on December 3, 2020
No.	Title	Lyrics	Music	Artist	Length
1.	"O.V.E.R" (수란)	Kim Ji-soo, Y.nik	Kim Ji-soo, Y.nik	Suran	3:12
2.	"O.V.E.R (Inst.)"		Kim Ji-soo, Y.nik		3:12
Total length:					6:24

=== Part 2 ===
Released on December 17, 2020
No.	Title	Lyrics	Music	Artist	Length
1.	"Whisper" (루이드)	Llwyd, Y.nik	Llwyd, Y.nik, Jisoo Kim	Llwyd	3:26
2.	"Whisper (Inst.)"		Llwyd, Y.nik, Jisoo Kim		3:26
Total length:					6:52

=== Part 3 ===
Released on December 30, 2020
No.	Title	Lyrics	Music	Artist	Length
1.	"Fade Out"	Kim Ji-soo	Kim Ji-soo, 2L	JeA	3:42
2.	"Fade Out (Inst.)"		Kim Ji-soo, 2L		3:42
Total length:					7:24

== Viewership ==
According to Nielsen Korea the first episode of the series recorded 5.8% average audience viewership nationwide and 6.2% in metropolitan area. It ranked first among Wednesday and Thursday dramas.

Cheat on Me If You Can : South Korea viewers per episode (thousands)

Season	Episode number																Average
Season	1	2	3	4	5	6	7	8	9	10	11	12	13	14	15	16	Average
1	888	1035	TBD	860	TBD	TBD	TBD	TBD	TBD	TBD	TBD	TBD	TBD	TBD	TBD	TBD	TBD

Source: Audience measurement performed nationwide by Nielsen Korea.

Average TV viewership ratings
Ep.	Part	Original broadcast date	Average audience share	
Ep.	Part	Original broadcast date	Nielsen Korea	
Ep.	Part	Original broadcast date	Nationwide	Seoul
1	1	December 2, 2020	4.1%	N/A
1	2	December 2, 2020	5.8% (19th)	6.2% (14th)
2	1	December 3, 2020	4.3%	N/A
2	2	December 3, 2020	5.8% (12th)	6.3% (12th)
3	1	December 9, 2020	3.3%	—N/a
3	2	December 9, 2020	4.5% (26th)	—N/a
4	1	December 10, 2020	4.2%	—N/a
4	2	December 10, 2020	5.2% (17th)	5.8% (12th)
5	1	December 16, 2020	2.7%	—N/a
5	2	December 16, 2020	4.1% (28th)	—N/a
6	1	December 17, 2020	3.2%	—N/a
6	2	December 17, 2020	3.9% (26th)	—N/a
7	1	December 23, 2020	2.9%	—N/a
7	2	December 23, 2020	3.8% (32nd)	—N/a
8	1	December 30, 2020	2.4%	—N/a
8	2	December 30, 2020	3.6% (27th)	—N/a
9	1	January 6, 2021	2.4%	—N/a
9	2	January 6, 2021	3.1% (36th)	—N/a
10	1	January 7, 2021	2.9%	—N/a
10	2	January 7, 2021	3.0% (37th)	—N/a
11	1	January 13, 2021	2.6%	—N/a
11	2	January 13, 2021	3.4% (33rd)	—N/a
12	1	January 14, 2021	2.8%	—N/a
12	2	January 14, 2021	3.1% (33rd)	—N/a
13	1	January 20, 2021		—N/a
13	2	January 20, 2021	3.5% (29th)	—N/a
14	1	January 21, 2021		—N/a
14	2	January 21, 2021	3.0% (32nd)	—N/a
15	1	January 27, 2021		—N/a
15	2	January 27, 2021	4.6% (22nd)	—N/a
16	1	January 28, 2021	3.3%	—N/a
16	2	January 28, 2021	4.0% (25th)	—N/a
Average			%	%
The blue numbers represent the lowest ratings and the red numbers represent the highest ratings.; NR denotes that the series did not rank in the top 20 daily programs on that date.; N/A denotes that the rating is not known.

== Awards and nominations ==
Year	Award	Category	Recipient	Result
2020	KBS Drama Awards	Top Excellence Award, Actress	Cho Yeo-jeong	Nominated
2020	KBS Drama Awards	Excellence Award, Actor in a Miniseries	Go Jun	Nominated
2020	KBS Drama Awards	Excellence Award, Actress in a Miniseries	Cho Yeo-jeong	Won
2020	KBS Drama Awards	Best Supporting Actor	Jung Sang-hoon	Nominated
2020	KBS Drama Awards	Best Supporting Actress	Hong Soo-hyun	Nominated
2020	KBS Drama Awards	Best New Actor	Kim Young-dae	Nominated
2020	KBS Drama Awards	Netizen Award, Actor	Kim Young-dae	Won
2020	KBS Drama Awards	Best Couple Award	Cho Yeo-jeong and Go Jun	Won
