= Kim Young-dae =

South Korean actor (born 1996)

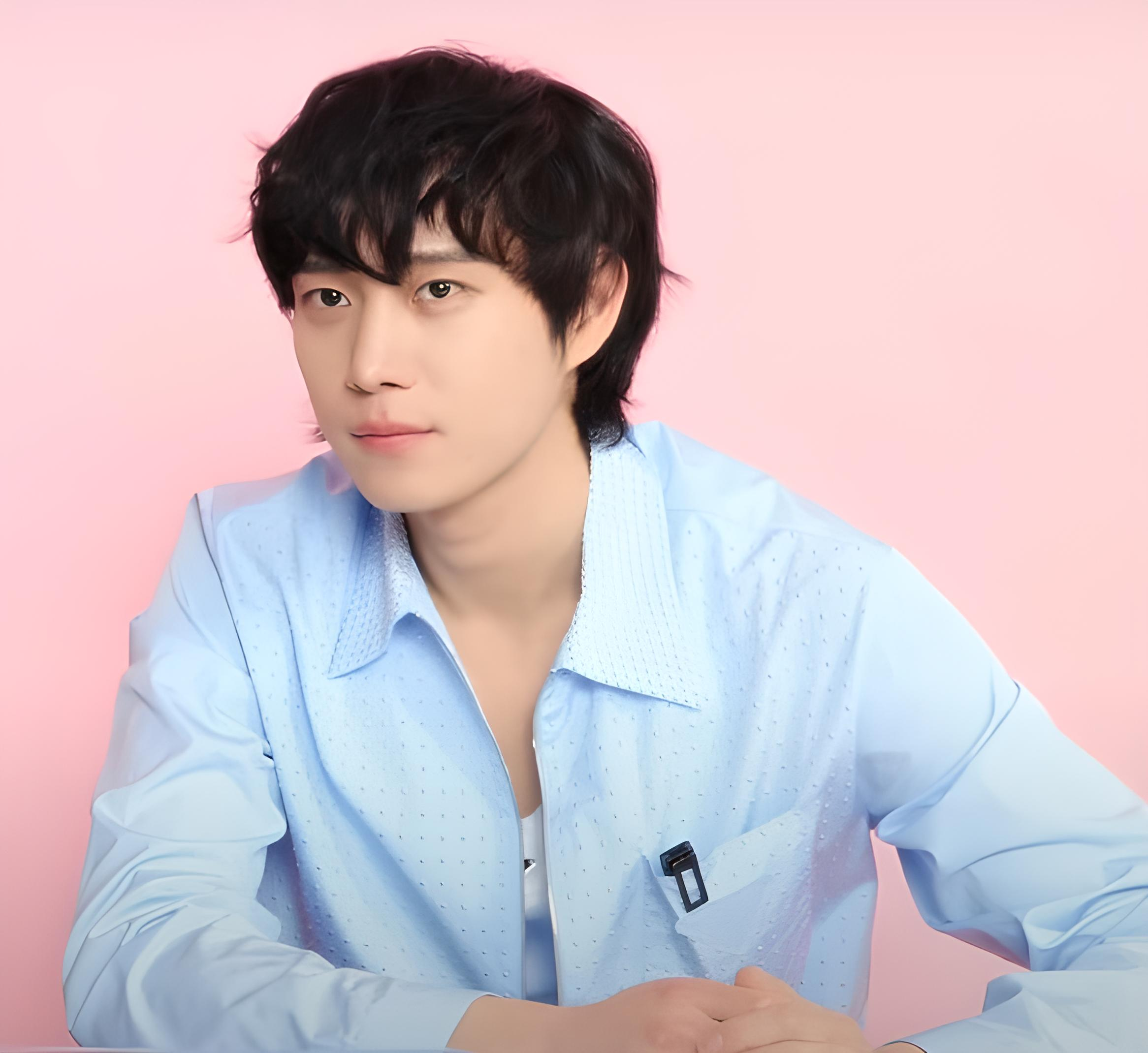
- Kim in 2022
- Born: March 2, 1996 (age 30); Seoul, South Korea
- Education: Digital Seoul Culture Arts University
- Occupation: Actor
- Years active: 2017–present
- Agent: Outer Universe

Korean name
- Hangul: 김영대
- Hanja: 金永大
- RR: Gim Yeongdae
- MR: Kim Yŏngdae
- Website: outeruniverse.co.kr

Signature
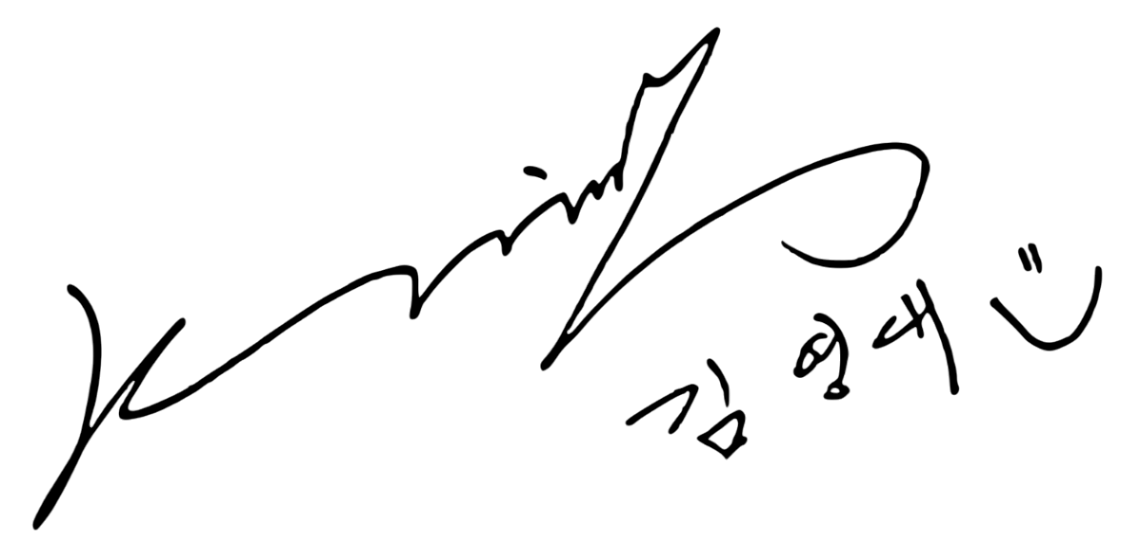

Kim Young-dae (Korean: 김영대; born March 2, 1996) is a South Korean actor. He first gained recognition for the MBC high school drama Extraordinary You (2019). More recently, he appeared in the SBS television series The Penthouse: War In Life (2020–2021) and the KBS2 television series Cheat on Me If You Can (2020). Kim took on his first leading role in tvN television series Shooting Stars (2022), and later appeared in sageuk The Forbidden Marriage (2022–2023).

== Career ==
=== 2017–2018: Early career ===
In 2017, Kim made his debut with the web drama Secret Crushes: Special Edition. He also appeared in other by web dramas including Office Watch 2, Just Too Bored, What to Do with You, It's Okay To Be Sensitive, Office Watch 3 with minor roles.

In 2018, Kim made his acting debut on television the Drama Special episode drama The Time Left Between Us broadcast on KBS2. Despite his first television role, he continued to play minor characters in different shows. Kim also starred in the drama Item as younger Ju Ji-hoon which aired on MBC and made a special appearance in the drama Welcome to Waikiki 2.

=== 2018–present: Rise in popularity and leading role ===
On June 12, 2018, it was announced that Kim would be part of the main cast for the MBC television series Extraordinary You. The show started airing on October. The drama gained worldwide recognition and Kim was praised for his acting. On October 2, Kim appeared on MBC's Idol Radio together with other cast members Kim Hye-yoon, Rowoon, and Lee Na-eun. On October 17, Kim modeled for Songzio Homme, (designer Song Zio's fashion show) at the 2019 Hera Seoul Fashion Week, held at Dongdaemun Design Plaza in Seoul.

In 2020, Kim appeared in the dramas When the Weather Is Fine which aired on JTBC, and Cheat on Me If You Can which aired on KBS2. The latter won him a Netizen Award, Actor at the KBS Drama Awards. The same year, Kim starred in the drama The Penthouse: War in Life which aired on SBS. The drama gained immense popularity both locally and worldwide, becoming a stepping stone for Kim in the industry. The drama also gained him a huge number of international fans. He later gained nomination for SBS Drama Awards Best New Actor category and 57th Baeksang Arts Awards category Best New Actor – Television due to his role in the drama.

In 2021, Kim made a special appearances in True Beauty and Undercover.

In 2022, Kim appeared as a muse at the 2022 F/W Paris Collection digital fashion show Songzio. Later in April, Kim starred in the tvN drama Shooting Stars alongside Lee Sung-kyung, which marked his first lead role.

== Philanthropy ==
In December 2022, Kim made a donation to support the children in the 2021 group shelter, and in 2022, he continued warmly by donating to Big Issue Korea for the underprivileged.

== Filmography ==
=== Television series ===
Year	Title	Role	Notes	Ref.
2018	Drama Special – The Time Left Between Us	Kim Min-shik	One act-drama	
2019	Item	Kim Sung-kyu / Gang Gon (young)	Cameo	
2019	Welcome to Waikiki 2	Rookie pitcher	Cameo (Episode 2)	
2019	Extraordinary You	Oh Nam-joo		
2020	When the Weather Is Fine	Oh Young-woo	Cameo (Episode 5,6, 16)	
2020–2021	Cheat on Me If You Can	Cha Soo-ho		
2020–2021	The Penthouse: War in Life	Joo Seok-hoon	Season 1–3	
2021	True Beauty	Oh Nam-joo	Cameo (Episode 15)	
2021	Undercover	Kim Tae-Yeol	Cameo (Episode 2)	
2022	Shooting Stars	Gong Tae-sung		
2022–2023	The Forbidden Marriage	Lee Heon		
2023	Moon in the Day	Han Jun-oh / Do-ha		
2024	No Gain No Love	Kim Ji-wook		
2024	Perfect Family	Park Kyung-ho		
2025	To The Moon	Ham Ji-woo		
2025	Dear X	Yun Jun-seo		
2026	Boyfriend on Demand	An assassin	Cameo	

=== Web series ===
Year	Title	Role	Notes	Ref.
2017	Secret Crushes: Special Edition	Kim Young-dae		
2018	Office Watch 2	Delivery man		
2018	Just Too Bored	Joo Seung-woo		
2018	What to Do with You	Lee Guen		
2018	Crushes Reverse	Customer	Cameo (Episode 6)	
2018	Room of Romance	Waiter	Cameo (Episode 5)	
2018	It's Okay To Be Sensitive	Kim Do-hwan		
2019	About Youth	Lee Jay	Korean-Vietnam joint web drama	
2019	It's Okay To Be Sensitive 2	Do-hwan	Cameo (Episode 10)	
2019	Office Watch 3	Yeon Ha-jun		
2019	To my beautiful us	Park Jun-seok		
2019	Omniscient Unrequited Love – Special edition	Kim Young-dae	Ad web drama KB Kookmin Card	
2025	I Am a Running Mate	Deliveryman	Cameo (Ep.8)	

=== Television show ===
Year	Title	Role	Ref.
2021	2021 Peace Concert - Heart, Connect	Narrator	

=== Music videos appearances ===
Year	Song Title	Artist	Notes	Ref.
2018	"The First Night" (첫날밤)	Ben & Kim Won-joo (from 4Men)		
2021	"Graduation Tears" (졸업 눈물)	Yoon Jong-shin	with Kim Sae-ron	

== Theater ==
Year	Title	Role	Ref.
2017–2018	A Story to Kill	Euthanasia	

== Ambassadorship ==
- International Environment City Seo-gu (2021)

== Accolades ==
=== Awards and nominations ===
Name of the award ceremony, year presented, category, nominee of the award, and the result of the nomination
Award ceremony	Year	Category	Nominee / Work	Result	Ref.
Asia Artist Awards	2023	Best Acting Performance	Kim Young-dae	Won	
Asia Artist Awards	2022	Best Acting Performance	Sh**ting Stars	Won	
Asia Model Awards (Note: Asia Model Awards is an annual ceremony that recognizes Asia's top models and celebrities.)	2022	Popularity Award, Actor	Kim Young-dae	Won	
Baeksang Arts Awards	2021	Best New Actor – Television	The Penthouse: War in Life	Nominated	
Brand of the Year Awards	2021	Best New Actor	Kim Young-dae	Won	
MBC Drama Awards	2019	Best New Actor	Extraordinary You	Nominated	
MBC Drama Awards	2022	Excellence Award, Actor in a Miniseries	The Forbidden Marriage	Won	
MBC Drama Awards	2022	Best Couple Award	Kim Young-dae (with Park Ju-hyun); The Forbidden Marriage	Nominated	
MBC Drama Awards	2025	Best Couple Award	Kim Young-dae (with Lee Sun-bin); To the Moon	Nominated	
KBS Drama Awards	2020	Best New Actor	Cheat on Me If You Can	Nominated	
KBS Drama Awards	2020	Netizen Award, Actor	Cheat on Me If You Can	Won	
SBS Drama Awards	2020	Best New Actor	The Penthouse: War in Life	Nominated	
SBS Drama Awards	2021	Best New Actor	The Penthouse: War in Life 2 and 3	Won	

=== Listicles ===
Name of publisher, year listed, name of listicle, and placement
Publisher	Year	Listicle	Placement	Ref.
Cine21	2020	10 Stars and Rising Stars	Placed	
