= Park Ju-hyun =

South Korean actress (born 1994)

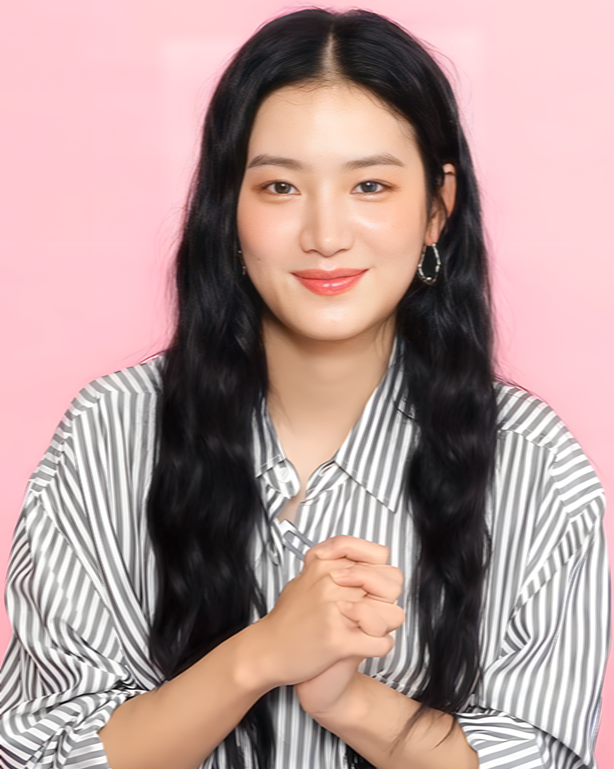
- Park in 2022
- Born: October 5, 1994 (age 32); Busan, South Korea
- Education: Korea National University of Arts (Acting)
- Occupation: Actress
- Years active: 2019–present
- Agent: 935 Entertainment

Korean name
- Hangul: 박주현
- RR: Bak Juhyeon
- MR: Pak Chuhyŏn

Park Ju-hyun (Korean: 박주현; born October 5, 1994) is a South Korean actress. She debuted in the film The Dude In Me (2019) followed by tvN 's television film Drama Stage Season 3: My Wife's Bed. She gained recognition with her appearance in the drama series A Piece of Your Mind (2020) and starred in her first lead role as Bae Gyu-ri in Netflix original series Extracurricular (2020).

== Biography ==
Park Ju-hyun was born on October 5, 1994, in Saha District, Busan, South Korea. She gained an interest in acting after seeing the musical Cats in her first year of high school. She majored in acting at the Korea National University of Arts and appeared in short films and plays as a student; she graduated in July 2020.

== Career ==
She debuted in 2019 in the film The Dude in Me.

In 2020, Park appeared in the television series Zombie Detective as Gong Sun-ji. It aired on KBS2.

In 2025, Park played the role of Viola De Lesseps in the play Shakespeare in Love.

== Filmography ==
=== Film ===
Year	Title	Role	Notes	Ref.
2019	The Dude in Me	Student #1	Guest role	
2022	Seoul Vibe	Park Yoon-hee	Netflix Film	
2024	Project Silence	Shim Yoo-ra		
2024	Drive	Han Yu-na		
2024	You Will Die in 6 Hours	Lee Jung-yoon		
TBA	The Gardeners	Jung Hae-ri		

=== Television series ===
Year	Title	Role	Notes	Ref.
2019	Drama Stage – "My Wife's Bed"	Han Che-ri	One act-drama	
2020	A Piece of Your Mind	Kim Ji-soo		
2020	Zombie Detective	Kong Sun-ji		
2020	Extracurricular	Bae Gyu-ri		
2021	Mouse	Oh Bong-yi		
2022	Love All Play	Park Tae-yang		
2022–2023	The Forbidden Marriage	So-rang		
2024	Perfect Family	Choi Seon-hee		
2025	Hunter with a Scalpel	Seo Se-hyun		
2026	Sigor Amor	Hong Mi-jin		

=== Television shows ===
Year	Title	Role	Notes	Ref.
2024–2025	Iron Girls	Cast member	Season 1–2	

=== Hosting ===
Year	Title	Notes	Ref.
2020	5th Asia Artist Awards	with Leeteuk	

=== Music video appearances ===
Year	Title	Artist	Ref.
2019	"Swing"	OurR	
2020	"Cartoon"	Zico	
2020	"Workman"	Jang Sung-kyu (feat. Jay Park, Sik-K)	

== Stage ==
=== Theater ===
Year	Play	Notes	Ref.
2025	Shakespeare in Love	Viola De Lesseps	

== Discography ==
=== Soundtrack appearances ===
Title	Year	Album
"My Own Season" (나만의 계절)	2022	Love All Play OST

=== Composition ===
Year	Title	Artist	Position
2018	"Monster"	Henry Lau	Lyricist

== Awards and nominations ==
Name of the award ceremony, year presented, category, nominee of the award, and the result of the nomination
Award ceremony	Year	Category	Nominee / Work	Result	Ref.
APAN Star Awards	2021	Best New Actress	Zombie Detective	Nominated	
Asia Artist Awards	2020	Best Choice Award – Actor	Park Ju-hyun	Won	
Baeksang Arts Awards	2021	Best New Actress – Television	Extracurricular	Won	
Blue Dragon Film Awards	2024	Best New Actress	Drive	Won	
KBS Drama Awards	2020	Best New Actress	Zombie Detective	Nominated	
KBS Drama Awards	2022	Best New Actress	Love All Play	Nominated	
MBC Drama Awards	2022	Excellence Award, Actor in a Miniseries	The Forbidden Marriage	Won	
MBC Drama Awards	2022	Best Couple Award	Park Ju-hyun (with Kim Young-dae); The Forbidden Marriage	Nominated	
