= Mission: Mompossible =

2026 South Korean television series

- Promotional poster
- Hangul: 엄마가 미쳤어요
- Hanja: 엄마가 美쳤어요
- Lit.: Mom Is Crazy
- RR: Eommaga micheosseoyo
- MR: Ŏmmaga mich'ŏssŏyo
- Genre: Coming-of-age; Family drama
- Written by: Na Seung-hyun
- Directed by: Seong Jun-hae
- Starring: Jung Min-ah; Dong Ha; Kim Hee-jung; Kang Kyung-hun
- Country of origin: South Korea
- Original language: Korean
- No. of episodes: 40

Production
- Running time: 30 minutes
- Production companies: Fantagio; Monster Union

Original release
- Network: KBS1
- Release: September 28, 2026 – present

Mission: Mompossible (Korean: 엄마가 미쳤어요) is an ongoing South Korean coming-of-age family drama television series written by Na Seung-hyun, directed by Seong Jun-hae, and starring Jung Min-ah, Dong Ha, Kim Hee-jung, and Kang Kyung-hun. The series depicts the entanglement of two families led by mothers with opposite values, one devoted entirely to her family and the other to herself. Their children, who regard each other as sworn enemies, are also involved. It premiered on KBS1 on September 28, 2026, and airs every Monday to Friday at 20:30 (KST).

== Synopsis ==
The series follows Jo Mi-mi, the owner of Mimi's Samgyetang, who raised three children alone after her husband's affair. Believing her children becoming independent would bring her peace, she decides to focus on her own life. However, her plans are disrupted when her divorced eldest son and her second son, who has debt problems, return to live with her. Her youngest daughter, Da-mi, also quits her job unexpectedly, leaving Jo Mi-mi to manage the renewed challenges of supporting her family.

== Cast and characters ==
=== Main ===
- Jung Min-ah as Kang Da-mi

Seung-yoon's personal assistant. She is Mi-mi's youngest adopted daughter who aspires to become a fashion designer.

- Dong Ha as Cha Seung-yoon

Chief designer at Hwanggeum Apparel and the eldest grandson of the Hwanggeum family. Having lost his parents in an accident during childhood, he grew up in the United States as a fashion designer. Years later, he returns to find the truth about their deaths and begins working with Kang Da-mi as her boss and assistant.

- Kim Hee-jung as Jo Mi-mi

Da-mi's adoptive mother and the owner of a Samgye-tang (chicken soup) restaurant.

- Kang Kyung-hun as Jeon Jin-hee

CEO of Hwanggeum Apparel and daughter-in-law of the Hwanggeum family.

=== Supporting ===
- Kim Young-ok as Hwang Geum-soon

In-seong's mother and the paternal grandmother of Seung-yoon. She is the founder of Hwanggeum Capital.

- Yang Hee-kyung as Choi Soon-deok

Hak-seong's mother and Mi-mi's mother-in-law. She is the founder of Mi-mi's Samgye-tang.

- Lee Han-wi as Kang Hak-seong

Mi-mi's ex-husband and a taxi driver. He left his family after having an affair with Ji-young.

- Nam Sung-jin as Cha In-seong

Geum-soon's son and Jin-hee's husband. He is the CEO of Hwanggeum Capital.

- Jo Mi-ryung as Park Ji-young

Hak-seong's wife.

- Kang Eun-tak as Kang Kang-nam

Mi-mi's eldest son.

- Gong Jung-hwan as Joo Kyung-ho

Mi-mi's boyfriend and Geum-soon's attending physician.

- Ahn Yeon-hong as Jo Ri-ja

Mi-mi's younger sister and an employee at Mi-mi's Samgye-tang.

- Kim Jong-hoon as Kang Dae-chi
- Kim Ga-ran as Kim Mi-sun
- Bae Ji-wan as Cha Do-yoon
- Choi Yu-bin as Cha Se-na
- Kim Na-eun as Kang Ye-ri
- Kim Rae-on as Kang Su-a

== Production ==
=== Development ===
The series, produced by Fantagio and Monster Union, is directed by Seong Jun-hae, who helmed Iron Family (2024–2025) and Bravo, My Life (2022), and written by Na Seung-hyun, who wrote The Love in Your Eyes (2022–2023).

=== Casting ===
On August 19, 2026, Jung Min-ah, Dong Ha, Kim Hee-jung, and Kang Kyung-hun were confirmed to appear. The next day, the lineup including Kim Young-ok, Yang Hee-kyung, Lee Han-wi, Nam Sung-jin, Jo Mi-ryung, Kang Eun-tak, Gong Jung-hwan, and Ahn Yeon-hong was announced.

=== Filming ===
Principal photography began at the end of July 2026.

== Viewership ==
Mission: Mompossible : South Korea viewers per episode (millions)

Episodes	Episode number																								
Episodes	1	2	3	4	5	6	7	8	9	10	11	12	13	14	15	16	17	18	19	20	21	22	23	24	25
1–25	1.449	1.384	1.639	1.850	1.471	2.018	1.814	1.892	1.989	1.952	1.843	1.955	1.782	1.965	1.964	2.013	1.924	1.881	1.843	1.791	1.912	1.630	1.827	1.940	1.877
26–50	1.986	1.918	1.831	2.031	1.803	2.030	2.024	1.943	2.082	1.932	2.062	2.118	2.120	2.124	1.957	TBD	TBD	TBD	TBD	TBD	TBD	TBD	TBD	TBD	TBD
51–75	TBD	TBD	TBD	TBD	TBD	TBD	TBD	TBD	TBD	TBD	TBD	TBD	TBD	TBD	TBD	TBD	TBD	TBD	TBD	TBD	TBD	TBD	TBD	TBD	TBD
76–100	TBD	TBD	TBD	TBD	TBD	TBD	TBD	TBD	TBD	TBD	TBD	TBD	TBD	TBD	TBD	TBD	TBD	TBD	TBD	TBD	TBD	TBD	TBD	TBD	TBD
101–120	TBD	TBD	TBD	TBD	TBD	TBD	TBD	TBD	TBD	TBD	TBD	TBD	TBD	TBD	TBD	TBD	TBD	TBD	TBD	TBD	–				

Source: Audience measurement performed nationwide by Nielsen Korea.

Average TV viewership ratings
Ep.	Original broadcast date	Average audience share	
Ep.	Original broadcast date	Nielsen Korea	
Ep.	Original broadcast date	Nationwide	Seoul
1	September 28, 2026	7.7% (1st)	6.6% (1st)
2	September 29, 2026	7.3% (2nd)	6.0% (3rd)
3	September 30, 2026	8.8% (1st)	7.3% (1st)
4	October 1, 2026	9.6% (1st)	8.1% (1st)
5	October 2, 2026	7.6% (1st)	6.4% (1st)
6	October 5, 2026	10.0% (1st)	8.1% (1st)
7	October 6, 2026	9.2% (1st)	7.7% (1st)
8	October 7, 2026	9.9% (1st)	8.9% (1st)
9	October 8, 2026	10.4% (1st)	8.7% (1st)
10	October 9, 2026	10.1% (2nd)	8.3% (2nd)
11	October 12, 2026	10.2% (1st)	8.3% (1st)
12	October 13, 2026	10.2% (1st)	8.9% (1st)
13	October 14, 2026	9.3% (1st)	7.6% (1st)
14	October 15, 2026	10.1% (1st)	8.7% (1st)
15	October 16, 2026	10.2% (2nd)	8.6% (2nd)
16	October 19, 2026	10.3% (1st)	8.5% (1st)
17	October 20, 2026	10.1% (1st)	8.1% (1st)
18	October 21, 2026	9.8% (1st)	8.1% (1st)
19	October 22, 2026	9.8% (1st)	8.5% (1st)
20	October 23, 2026	9.6% (2nd)	8.0% (2nd)
21	October 26, 2026	10.2% (1st)	8.4% (1st)
22	October 27, 2026	8.7% (1st)	7.3% (1st)
23	October 28, 2026	9.6% (1st)	8.4% (1st)
24	October 29, 2026	9.9% (1st)	8.1% (2nd)
25	October 30, 2026	9.9% (2nd)	7.9% (2nd)
26	November 2, 2026	10.4% (1st)	8.5% (1st)
27	November 3, 2026	10.0% (1st)	8.6% (1st)
28	November 4, 2026	9.8% (1st)	8.1% (2nd)
29	November 5, 2026	10.8% (1st)	9.0% (1st)
30	November 6, 2026	9.7% (2nd)	8.5% (2nd)
31	November 9, 2026	10.9% (1st)	9.1% (1st)
32	November 10, 2026	10.4% (1st)	8.6% (1st)
33	November 11, 2026	10.1% (1st)	8.0% (1st)
34	November 12, 2026	11.0% (1st)	8.9% (1st)
35	November 13, 2026	10.2% (2nd)	8.6% (2nd)
36	November 16, 2026	10.8% (1st)	8.9% (1st)
37	November 17, 2026	10.7% (1st)	9.5% (1st)
38	November 18, 2026	11.1% (1st)	9.5% (1st)
39	November 19, 2026	11.2% (1st)	9.6% (1st)
40	November 20, 2026	10.3% (1st)	9.0% (1st)
41	November 23, 2026		
42	November 24, 2026		
43	November 25, 2026		
44	November 26, 2026		
45	November 27, 2026		
46	November 30, 2026		
47	December 1, 2026		
48	December 2, 2026		
49	December 3, 2026		
50	December 4, 2026		
Average		—	—
In the table above, the blue numbers represent the lowest ratings and the red numbers represent the highest ratings.
