= Once Again (South Korean TV series) =

2020 South Korean television series

- Promotional poster
- Hangul: 한 번 다녀왔습니다
- Lit.: I've Been There Once
- RR: Han beon danyeowatseumnida
- MR: Han pŏn tanyŏwassŭmnida
- Genre: Drama; Melodrama
- Written by: Yang Hee-seung; Ahn Ah-reum
- Directed by: Lee Jae-sang
- Starring: Lee Sang-yeob; Lee Min-jung
- Composer: Lee Kyu-ok
- Country of origin: South Korea
- Original language: Korean
- No. of episodes: 100 (Note: In order to circumvent Korean laws that prevent commercial breaks in the middle of an episode, what would previously have been aired as single 70 minute episodes are now being repackaged as two 35 minute episodes, with two episodes being shown each night with a commercial break between the two.)

Production
- Executive producers: Hwang Eui-kyung (1-4); Ki Min-soo (5-50); KBS Media
- Producers: Kim Young-gyu; Moon Seok-hwan; Oh Kwang-hee
- Camera setup: Single-camera
- Running time: 35 minutes
- Production companies: Once Again Special Purpose Co. LLC; Bon Factory Worldwide; Studio Dragon

Original release
- Network: KBS2
- Release: March 28 – September 13, 2020

Once Again (Korean: 한 번 다녀왔습니다) is a 2020 South Korean family drama television series starring Lee Sang-yeob and Lee Min-jung. The drama aired on KBS2 from March 28 to September 13, 2020, every Saturday and Sunday from 19:55 to 21:15 (KST).

== Synopsis ==
Song Young-dal (Cheon Ho-jin) and Jang Ok-boon (Cha Hwa-yeon) have been married for many years and they have four children (a son and three daughters): Joon-sun (Oh Dae-hwan), Ga-hee (Oh Yoon-ah), Na-hee (Lee Min-jung) and Da-hee (Lee Cho-hee).

Third child Na-Hee is a doctor and she works with her husband Doctor Yoon Gyu-jin (Lee Sang-yeob) at the same hospital. They fell in love during their medical school days and got married, but their marriage life is not doing very well. Meanwhile, the first child Joon-sun (Oh Dae-hwan) and the second child Ga-hee (Oh Yoon-ah) are both divorcees and live with their parents. The youngest child Da-Hee struggles as an intern at a company.

== Cast ==
=== Main ===
- Chun Ho-jin as Song Young-dal
- Cha Hwa-yeon as Jang Ok-boon
- Lee Min-jung as Song Na-hee — Young-dal and Ok-boon's third child, a pediatrician.
- Lee Sang-yeob as Yoon Gyu-jin — Na-hee's husband, an internist.

=== Supporting ===
- Oh Dae-hwan as Song Joon-sun — Young-dal and Ok-boon's eldest child.
- Oh Yoon-ah as Song Ga-hee — Young-dal and Ok-boon's second child.
- Lee Cho-hee as Song Da-hee — Young-dal and Ok-boon's youngest child.
- Moon Woo-jin as Kim Ji-hoon — Ga-hee's son.

==== Yoon Gyu-jin's family ====
- Sung Chan-ho as Gyu-jin and Jae-seok's deceased father, only appears in their family photo.
- Kim Bo-yeon as Choi Yoon-jung — Gyu-jin and Jae-seok's mother.
- Lee Sang-yi as Yoon Jae-seok — Gyu-jin's younger brother, Da-hee's love interest, later her husband.

==== Yongju Market ====
- Lee Jung-eun as Kang Cho-yeon — Sister's Kimbap store owner. Young-dal's long-lost younger sister, Song Young-sook.
- Baek Ji-won as Jang Ok-ja — Ok-boon's unmarried younger sister.
- Ahn Gil-kang as Yang Chi-soo — Young-dal's friend.
- Ki Do-hoon as Park Hyo-shin — Song's family fried chicken restaurant part-time delivery man, later became a stuntman for Joon-sun's action company. Ga-hee's love interest.
- Kim So-ra as Lee Joo-ri — Sister's Kimbap store worker.
- Song Da-eun as Kim Ga-yeon — Sister's Kimbap store worker.
- Shin Mi-young as Park Kyung-hwa — Dried fish store owner.
- Kim Ga-young as Im Jin-joo — Twisted donut store owner.

==== Family of Joon-sun ====
- Im Jung-eun as Sung Hyun-kyung — Joon-sun's wife.
- Lee Ga-yeon as Song Seo-young — Joon-sun's eldest daughter.
- Ahn Seo-yeon as Song Seo-jin — Joon-sun's younger daughter.

==== Members of Evergreen Children's Hospital ====
- Alex Chu as Lee Jeong-rok — Na-hee's medical school senior.
- Son Seong-yoon as Yoo Bo-young — Gyu-jin's first love.
- Song Min-jae as Yoo Shi-hoo — Bo-young's son.
- Shin Soo-jung as Park Ji-yeon
- Kang You-seok as Han Gi-young
- Kim Hyun-mok as Hong Sung-woo
- Kim Mi-eun as Shin Hye-jung
- Lee Sang-kyung as Shim Jung-hee
- Han Bom as Oh Yeon-ji

=== Others ===
- Oh Eui-shik as Oh Jung-bong — Joon-sun's action junior, a stuntman.
- Jang Won-hyuk as Lee Jong-soo — Joon-sun's action junior, a stuntman.
- Bae Ho-geun as Kim Seung-hyun — Ga-hee's ex-husband.
- Heo Hyun-ho as Monk Yong Kang — Monk who is a father figure to Cho-yeon.
- Kim Hye-won as Kwon Ji-hye — Ga-hee's store manager.
- Jung Han-bit as Seo Yoon-hee — Jae-seok's blind date.
- Jo Mi-ryung as Hong Yeon-hong — Cho-yeon's friend, a schemer and troublemaker.
- Nam Jung-hee as Shim Moon-sil — Yeon-hong's mother.

=== Special appearances ===
- Ji Il-joo as Cha Young-hoon — Da-hee's ex-fiancé.
- Son Jong-hak as Jang Choong-soo — Evergreen Children Hospital's director.
- Lee Sung-kyung as Ji Sun-kyung — Jae-seok's ex-girlfriend.
- Kang Chan-hee as Choi Ji-won — Da-hee's friend from college.
- Jo Han-chul as Jo Won-chul — Loan shark that harasses Yeon-hong for her debts.
- Lee Pil-mo as Lee Hyun — Hyun Media CEO, film director for Yongju Market's promotional video.

== Viewership ==
- In this table, the blue numbers represent the lowest ratings and the red numbers represent the highest ratings.
- N/A denotes that the rating is not known.
- The 48th episode of the series aired on September 6, 2020, logged a national average viewership of 37.0% with 6.8 million viewers watching the episode.

Ep.	Original broadcast date	Average audience share		
Ep.	Original broadcast date	Nielsen Korea		TNmS
Ep.	Original broadcast date	Nationwide	Seoul	Nationwide
1	March 28, 2020	19.4%	17.7%	20.2%
2	March 28, 2020	23.1%	21.7%	23.3%
3	March 29, 2020	22.9%	23.2%	22.3%
4	March 29, 2020	26.3%	25.3%	26.4%
5	April 4, 2020	20.5%	18.8%	22.0%
6	April 4, 2020	24.5%	22.4%	25.4%
7	April 5, 2020	24.2%	22.8%	25.0%
8	April 5, 2020	28.1%	27.4%	29.1%
9	April 11, 2020	21.3%	20.1%	21.0%
10	April 11, 2020	26.0%	25.5%	25.3%
11	April 12, 2020	26.7%	26.1%	25.8%
12	April 12, 2020	29.6%	29.3%	29.3%
13	April 18, 2020	21.3%	20.8%	19.8%
14	April 18, 2020	26.6%	26.4%	23.1%
15	April 19, 2020	26.3%	25.7%	24.6%
16	April 19, 2020	29.9%	30.3%	27.0%
17	April 25, 2020	25.0%	21.4%	20.4%
18	April 25, 2020	25.5%	21.6%	25.2%
19	April 26, 2020	28.4%	23.9%	23.6%
20	April 26, 2020	28.8%	28.3%	27.9%
21	May 2, 2020	21.4%	21.2%	20.6%
22	May 2, 2020	26.1%	26.1%	25.3%
23	May 3, 2020	24.5%	23.7%	23.7%
24	May 3, 2020	28.2%	27.6%	28.2%
25	May 9, 2020	26.6%	26.7%	—N/a
26	May 9, 2020	22.1%	21.8%	—N/a
27	May 10, 2020	25.1%	25.0%	24.9%
28	May 10, 2020	30.2%	30.5%	29.4%
29	May 16, 2020	22.0%	21.9%	19.7%
30	May 16, 2020	27.2%	26.8%	24.3%
31	May 17, 2020	26.6%	27.1%	24.3%
32	May 17, 2020	29.9%	30.4%	29.3%
33	May 23, 2020	21.8%	21.4%	21.1%
34	May 23, 2020	26.3%	25.6%	25.8%
35	May 24, 2020	27.4%	27.2%	26.1%
36	May 24, 2020	31.1%	30.5%	29.5%
37	May 30, 2020	21.2%	20.4%	20.5%
38	May 30, 2020	27.0%	26.1%	26.0%
39	May 31, 2020	26.0%	25.6%	25.6%
40	May 31, 2020	30.9%	30.6%	29.5%
41	June 6, 2020	23.7%	24.1%	21.8%
42	June 6, 2020	28.5%	28.8%	26.8%
43	June 7, 2020	26.5%	26.0%	25.7%
44	June 7, 2020	30.1%	29.5%	30.0%
45	June 13, 2020	23.9%	23.1%	—N/a
46	June 13, 2020	28.7%	28.0%	—N/a
47	June 14, 2020	27.8%	27.5%	25.6%
48	June 14, 2020	31.6%	31.1%	30.3%
49	June 20, 2020	23.1%	23.4%	21.0%
50	June 20, 2020	28.8%	28.0%	26.5%
51	June 21, 2020	28.6%	28.5%	25.7%
52	June 21, 2020	31.5%	31.9%	29.9%
53	June 27, 2020	23.6%	23.3%	20.9%
54	June 27, 2020	28.0%	27.5%	26.9%
55	June 28, 2020	28.5%	28.3%	25.5%
56	June 28, 2020	32.2%	31.5%	30.1%
57	July 4, 2020	23.2%	22.6%	21.4%
58	July 4, 2020	28.6%	28.5%	25.6%
59	July 5, 2020	28.9%	28.5%	25.8%
60	July 5, 2020	33.0%	33.0%	29.7%
61	July 11, 2020	24.6%	24.2%	22.7%
62	July 11, 2020	29.6%	29.5%	27.7%
63	July 12, 2020	30.3%	29.7%	27.8%
64	July 12, 2020	33.3%	32.5%	30.9%
65	July 18, 2020	23.9%	23.5%	23.8%
66	July 18, 2020	29.4%	28.7%	28.4%
67	July 19, 2020	30.4%	30.3%	28.9%
68	July 19, 2020	33.7%	33.4%	33.0%
69	July 25, 2020	24.2%	23.1%	21.9%
70	July 25, 2020	28.7%	27.6%	26.3%
71	July 26, 2020	29.6%	28.9%	28.3%
72	July 26, 2020	33.0%	32.7%	32.0%
73	August 1, 2020	25.7%	25.0%	24.6%
74	August 1, 2020	30.1%	29.3%	29.5%
75	August 2, 2020	32.1%	32.3%	30.0%
76	August 2, 2020	35.6%	36.0%	34.2%
77	August 8, 2020	29.4%	28.7%	26.9%
78	August 8, 2020	33.2%	32.4%	30.6%
79	August 9, 2020	33.6%	33.2%	30.0%
80	August 9, 2020	36.5%	36.1%	33.6%
81	August 15, 2020	26.9%	27.0%	25.0%
82	August 15, 2020	31.4%	31.8%	30.0%
83	August 16, 2020	29.6%	28.6%	29.2%
84	August 16, 2020	32.9%	31.4%	32.5%
85	August 22, 2020	29.2%	29.5%	26.7%
86	August 22, 2020	33.2%	33.7%	30.8%
87	August 23, 2020	32.8%	32.5%	31.1%
88	August 23, 2020	35.5%	35.1%	35.2%
89	August 29, 2020	30.2%	30.2%	29.1%
90	August 29, 2020	35.5%	35.5%	33.7%
91	August 30, 2020	34.5%	34.0%	32.5%
92	August 30, 2020	36.5%	35.7%	35.5%
93	September 5, 2020	27.4%	26.0%	27.4%
94	September 5, 2020	32.6%	31.2%	31.9%
95	September 6, 2020	34.8%	34.7%	32.1%
96	September 6, 2020	37.0%	37.0%	35.4%
97	September 12, 2020	29.6%	28.9%	—N/a
98	September 12, 2020	33.5%	33.4%	—N/a
99	September 13, 2020	33.6%	33.0%	32.8%
100	September 13, 2020	34.8%	33.9%	34.9%
Average		28.4%	27.9%	— (Note: Due to some ratings not recorded, the exact average rating is unknown.)

== Awards and nominations ==
Year	Award	Category	Recipient	Result
2020	KBS Drama Awards	Daesang (Grand Prize)	Cheon Ho-jin	Won
2020	KBS Drama Awards	Top Excellence, Actor	Cheon Ho-jin	Nominated
2020	KBS Drama Awards	Top Excellence, Actress	Cha Hwa-yeon	Nominated
2020	KBS Drama Awards	Top Excellence, Actress	Lee Min-jung	Won
2020	KBS Drama Awards	Excellence Award, Actor in a Serial Drama	Cheon Ho-jin	Nominated
2020	KBS Drama Awards	Excellence Award, Actor in a Serial Drama	Lee Sang-yeob	Won
2020	KBS Drama Awards	Excellence Award, Actress in a Serial Drama	Cha Hwa-yeon	Nominated
2020	KBS Drama Awards	Excellence Award, Actress in a Serial Drama	Lee Jung-eun	Won
2020	KBS Drama Awards	Excellence Award, Actress in a Serial Drama	Lee Min-jung	Nominated
2020	KBS Drama Awards	Best Supporting Actor	Oh Dae-hwan	Won
2020	KBS Drama Awards	Best Supporting Actress	Baek Ji-won	Nominated
2020	KBS Drama Awards	Best Supporting Actress	Oh Yoon-ah	Won
2020	KBS Drama Awards	Best Young Actor	Moon Woo-jin	Won
2020	KBS Drama Awards	Best Young Actress	Ahn Seo-yeon	Nominated
2020	KBS Drama Awards	Best Young Actress	Lee Ga-yeon	Won
2020	KBS Drama Awards	Best New Actor	Lee Sang-yi	Won
2020	KBS Drama Awards	Best New Actress	Lee Cho-hee	Won
2020	KBS Drama Awards	Netizen Award, Actor	Lee Sang-yeob	Won
2020	KBS Drama Awards	Best Writer	Yang Hee-seung	Won
2020	KBS Drama Awards	Best Couple Award	Cheon Ho-jin and Lee Jung-eun	Won
2020	KBS Drama Awards	Best Couple Award	Lee Sang-yeob and Lee Min-jung	Won
2020	KBS Drama Awards	Best Couple Award	Lee Sang-yi and Lee Cho-hee	Won
2020	7th APAN Star Awards	Top Excellence Award, Actor in a Serial Drama	Lee Sang-yeob	Won
2020	7th APAN Star Awards	Top Excellence Award, Actress in a Serial Drama	Lee Min-jung	Won
2020	7th APAN Star Awards	Excellence Award, Actor in a Serial Drama	Lee Sang-yi	Won
2020	7th APAN Star Awards	Best Supporting Actress	Lee Jung-eun	Nominated
2020	7th APAN Star Awards	Best New Actress	Lee Cho-hee	Nominated
2020	7th APAN Star Awards	Popular Star Award, Actress	Lee Min-jung	Nominated

== Original soundtrack ==
Once Again OST

Soundtrack album by Various Artists
- Released: March 28, 2020
- Genres: Soundtrack, Pop
- Languages: Korean, English
- Labels: Bon Factory Worldwide, Kakao Entertainment

=== Track listings ===
No.	Title	Artist	Length
1.	"Let's Never Meet Again"	Park Bo-ram	3:37
2.	"LOVE IS DANGER"	Raina, Song Yuvin	3:44
3.	"Why Am I Like This"	Lee Sang-yi	3:24
4.	"The Day We Broke Up"	Ra.L	4:05
5.	"Everything Passes By"	Jung Dong-ha	3:38
