= Ko Jun =

South Korean actor (born 1978)

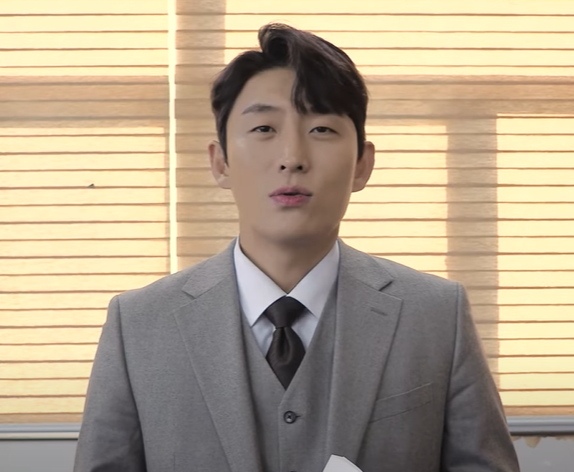
- Ko in October 2021
- Born: December 8, 1978 (age 47); Seoul, South Korea
- Occupation: Actor
- Years active: 2001–present
- Agent: Saram Entertainment
- Spouse: Unknown (m. 2026)

Korean name
- Hangul: 김준호
- RR: Gim Junho
- MR: Kim Chunho

Stage name
- Hangul: 고준
- RR: Go Jun
- MR: Ko Chun

Ko Jun (Korean: 고준; born 8 December 1978), born Kim Joon-ho, is a South Korean actor known for his roles in the first season of The Fiery Priest (2019), and Good Boy (2025).

== Personal life ==
On April 5, 2026, Ko married his non-celebrity girlfriend in Seoul.

== Filmography ==
=== Film ===
Year	Title	Role	Ref.
2001	Wanee and Junah	Shin Yeong Ho	
2008	Scandal Makers	Commercial film director	
2009	Private Eye	Herb doctor	
2011	Sunny	Private detective	
2011	Sorry, Thanks	Lawyer	
2014	Navigation	Cheol-gyoo	
2014	Tazza: The Hidden Card	Yu-ryeong ("Ghost")	
2016	The Great Actor	Mi-Ji's father	
2016	The Age of Shadows	Shim Sang-do	
2016	Luck Key	Kwon Hee-rak	
2016	Missing	Jang Jin-hyuk	
2018	What a Man Wants	Hyo-bong	
2018	Sunset in My Hometown	Yong-dae	
2023	Faith	A	

=== Television series ===
Year	Title	Role	Ref.
2010	Dr. Champ	Chang-soo	
2010	Big Thing	Hwang Jae-man	
2016	The Good Wife	Jo Gook-hyun	
2017	Save Me	Cha Joon-goo	
2018	Misty	Lee Jae-yeong / Kevin Lee	
2018	A Very Midday Romance	Lee Pil-yong	
2019	The Fiery Priest	Hwang Cheol-bum	
2020	Oh My Baby	Han I-sang	
2020–2021	Cheat on Me If You Can	Han Woo-sun	
2024	Black Out	No Sang-cheol	
2025	Good Boy	Leo	

=== Web series ===
Year	Title	Platform	Role	Ref.
2022	Kiss Sixth Sense	Disney+	Ji-young's co-star (Cameo, Ep. 11)	
2022	Death to Snow White	Wavve	Sung-cheol	

=== Variety shows ===
Year	Show	Network	Notes
2019	Happy Together (Season 4)	KBS2	Guest (ep. 30)
2019	Knowing Bros	JTBC	Guest (ep. 179)
2019	My Little Old Boy	SBS	Special host (ep. 141–142)

== Awards and nominations ==
Year	Award	Category	Nominated work	Result	Ref.
2019	12th Korea Drama Awards	Star of the Year Award	The Fiery Priest	Won	
2019	27th SBS Drama Awards	Best Supporting Actor	The Fiery Priest	Won	
2020	34th KBS Drama Awards	Excellence Award, Actor in a Miniseries	Cheat on Me If You Can	Nominated	
2020	34th KBS Drama Awards	Best Couple Award with Cho Yeo-jeong	Cheat on Me If You Can	Won	
