= Drive (2023 film) =

2023 South Korean thriller film

- Theatrical film poster
- Hangul: 드라이브
- RR: Deuraibeu
- MR: Tŭraibŭ
- Directed by: Park Dong-hee
- Written by: Park Dong-hee
- Produced by: Kim Bong-seo; Dong-jun Seok
- Starring: Park Ju-hyun; Kim Yeo-jin; Kim Do-yoon; Jung Woong-in
- Edited by: Kim Sun-min
- Music by: Hwang Sang-jun
- Production companies: Merry Christmas Entertainment; Michigan Venture Capital
- Distributed by: M-Line Distributions
- Release dates: July 16, 2023 (Asian Film Festival of Dallas 2023); June 12, 2024 (South Korea)
- Running time: 90 minutes
- Country: South Korea
- Language: Korean
- Box office: US$764,276

Drive (Korean: 드라이브) is a 2023 South Korean action crime mystery thriller film directed and written by Park Dong-hee. It stars Park Ju-hyun, Kim Yeo-jin, Kim Do-yoon and Jung Woong-in. The film released in South Korea on June 12, 2024.

== Synopsis ==
Despite being a well-known YouTube influencer, Yuna constantly denigrates other people. She receives an invitation to a party for the launch of a cosmetic brand, but things don't go as planned. Exhausted and under a lot of stress, she calls a designated driver, takes a few shots, and then falls asleep. Yuna discovers she is stuck in her car's trunk when she opens her eyes. In addition to demanding money, the kidnapper demands that she perform a "kidnapping live-stream" in which she pleads with the audience for ransom. However, everyone believes she is acting out a situation that she made up.

== Cast ==
Main

- Park Ju-hyun as Han Yoo-na, a Popular YouTube influencer who was kidnapped and locked in a car's trunk.
- Kim Yeo-jin as Park Jeong-sook, a police lieutenant of the Woman and Youth Division who is an avid fan and supporter of Yoo-na who is the only one who believes in and assists Yoo-na.
- Kim Do-yoon as Choi Yoon-seok, Agency representative. A cop who gets caught up in a case.
- Jung Woong-in as Na Jin-soo, MBS director and a person who takes advantage of Yoo-na's ambition to engage in secret transactions.

Supporting

- Ha Do-kwon as Detective Jo Seong-woo
- Choi Yoon-ra as Ri-ah, Yoo-na's rival influencer
- Kim Hye-na as MBS team leader
- Jeon Seok-ho as Lee Do-yeong, a driver who kidnapped Yoo-na.
- Moon Sang-hoon as Cha Geun, as trunk streamer
- Choi Hyun-jin as Oh Yeong-soo, Park Jeong Sook's son
- Choi Bum-ho as a fake Cadillac driver
- Byeon Dong-wook as Kwang-soo, university team leader
- Park Ji-yeon as a situation room police
- Lee Chae-kyung

== Production ==
The principal photography of Drive began on June 1, 2021.

== Release ==
The film screened and included on the competition section on the 41st Brussels International Fantastic Film Festival in April 2023.

The film selected as the closing film of the 22nd Asian Film Festival of Dallas along with other Asian films on July 16, 2023.

It was invited and selected as part of the official selection to a leading overseas film festival Greek Horrorant Film Festival on its ninth edition.

The Drive is eagerly awaited by both domestic and international media and reviewers and has risen to the top of the Korean cinema reservation list ahead of its debut on the 12th.

The home video DVD edition was released in South Korea on March 20, 2025.

== Reception ==
Box Office

In South Korea, Drive sold 71,749 tickets, earning a total of US$764,276.

Critical

Park Ju-hyun's thriller film Drive has gotten mostly good reviews, with viewers complimenting its gripping plot, captivating performances, and tight atmosphere. However, some people think the finale is a little disappointing.

The film received favorable reviews overseas, including an invitation to the 41st Brussels International Fantastic Film Festival in competition before its domestic release.

Accolades

Year	Awards	Category	Results	Ref.
2024	Blue Dragon Film Awards	Best New Actress	Won	
