= No Matter What (TV series) =

2020 South Korean television daily drama

- Promotional poster
- Hangul: 누가 뭐래도
- Lit.: No Matter What Anyone Says
- RR: Nuga mworaedo
- MR: Nuga mwŏraedo
- Genre: Family drama; Romance; Comedy drama
- Created by: KBS Drama Production
- Written by: Go Bong-hwang
- Directed by: Sung Joon-hae
- Starring: Na Hye-mi; Choi Woong; Jung Min-ah; Kim Jung-heon
- Theme music composer: Yuri
- Opening theme: "Life Is Beautiful"
- Country of origin: South Korea
- Original language: Korean
- No. of episodes: 120

Production
- Executive producer: Woosung Jeon
- Producer: Sung Joon-hae
- Camera setup: Single-camera
- Running time: 30 minutes
- Production company: KBS Drama Production

Original release
- Network: KBS1
- Release: October 12, 2020 – March 26, 2021

No Matter What (Korean: 누가 뭐래도) is a 2020 South Korean television series starring Na Hye-mi, Choi Woong, Jung Min-ah and Kim Jung-heon. The series, directed by Sung Joon-hae and written by High Phoenix, revolves around an extended family and a flower shop filled with beautiful flowers 365 days in a year.

The daily drama premiered on KBS1 on October 12, 2020 and aired every weekday at 20:30 (KST), till March 26, 2021. The 94th episode, aired on February 18, 2021 logged an audience rating of 22.5% nationwide: the highest rating recorded by the series during its run.

== Synopsis ==
A family drama revolving around a flower shop filled with beautiful flowers 365 days in a year. It tells the story of children who experienced parental divorce and remarriage and grew up fighting in a world of prejudice, fiercely overcoming difficulties in work and love.

== Cast ==
Cast and characters profile:

=== Main ===
- Na Hye-mi as Kim Bo-ra, 28 years old, a Weather caster at DBS Press Bureau, with a good face and heart. Won-tae and Hae-shim's eldest daughter.
- Choi Woong as Kang Dae-ro, a youth creator, who dreams and works and a passionate delivery man.
- Jung Min-ah as Shin Ah-ri, 28 years old, a broadcasting writer who is scared at nothing in the world. With a brittle hair and gun-shining eyes. The second daughter of Junghan.
- Kim Jung-heon as Na Jun-su, 30 years old, a tough and competent start-up CEO. The representative of 'Day Break' market.

=== Supporting ===
- Do Ji-won as Hae-sim, 52 years old, florist, president of 'Piera Florist', mother of Bo-ra
- Kim Yu-seok as Sin Joong-han, 54 years old a 'Plus Market' Sales Manager, attentive and prudent, deep and caring
- Jeong Han-yong as Maengsoo Lee, lived as a school teacher and then retired as a principal. He is Hae-shim's father.
- Moon Hee-kyung as Noh Geum-suk (54 years old), Jun-su's mother and Hae-shim's High School Alumni.
- Kim Seung-wook as Na Seung-jin (in his 60s), Jun-su's father, CEO of 'I Production'.
- Jo Mi-ryung as Lee Ji-ran, (50 years old), Director of DBS broadcasting station.
- Taehwa Seo as Kim Won-tae (55 years old), Managing Director of 'Plus Market'.
- Lee Kan-hee as Jeong Nan-young (52 years old) Forge's mother and Ah-ri's birth mother.
- Kim Ha-yeon as Jeong Byori (12 years old), Nan-young's daughter.
- Song Chan-ik as Park Ja-geun (27 years old/), Assistant director of 'Natural People Live'.
- Jang Sung-yoon as Lee Eun-bi, a Natural person lives', the youngest artist.

Others

- Park Chul-min as Han Eok-shim, (in 70s), Natural person.
- Kim Dong-hui as Secretary Kim (in 30s) Junsu's secretary.

== Original soundtrack ==
No Matter What

Soundtrack album by Various
- Released: 2020-21
- Genre: Soundtrack
- Languages: Korean; English
- Label: Danal Entertainment

=== Part 1 ===
Released on October 18, 2020
No.	Title	Lyrics	Music	Artist	Length
1.	"Life is beautiful"	Major League	Major League	Yuri	3:24
2.	"Life is beautiful" (Inst.)	Major Leaguer	Major Leaguer	Yuri	3:24
Total length:					6:48

=== Part 2 ===
Released on October 25, 2020
No.	Title	Lyrics	Music	Artist	Length
1.	"People Are More Beautiful Than Flowers" (주예인)	Jeong Ji-won	Ahn Chi-hwan	Joo Yeah In	3:47
2.	"People Are More Beautiful Than Flowers (Inst.)"		Ahn Chi-hwan	Joo Yeah In	3:47
Total length:					7:34

=== Part 3 ===
Released on November 1, 2020
No.	Title	Lyrics	Music	Artist	Length
1.	"The Day We Meet Again" (더 데이지)	Win and Lose, Jamie	Win and Lose, Jamie	The Daisy	3:48
2.	"The Day We Meet Again (Inst.)"	Win and Lose, Jamie	Win and Lose, Jamie	The Daisy	3:48
Total length:					7:36

=== Part 4 ===
Released on November 3, 2020
No.	Title	Lyrics	Music	Artist	Length
1.	"Good good" (정다경)	Nadeul	Nadeul	Jung Da-kyung	3:21
2.	"Okay Okay (Inst.)"	Nadeul	Nadeul	Jung Da-kyung	3:21
Total length:					6:42

=== Part 5 ===
Released on November 8, 2020
No.	Title	Lyrics	Music	Artist	Length
1.	"You are awesome" (안예슬)	Major Leaguer, Ahn Ye-seul	Major Leaguer, Buzzer Beater	Ahn Ye-seul	4:22
2.	"You are awesome (Inst.)"	Major Leaguer, Ahn Ye-seul	Major Leaguer, Buzzer Beater	Ahn Ye-seul	4:22
Total length:					8:44

=== Part 6 ===
Released on November 11, 2020
No.	Title	Lyrics	Music	Artist	Length
1.	"You are my everything" (한살차이)	Major Leaguer	Major Leaguer, Heo Youngjin	Lim Sungheeof Hansal Difference	3:40
2.	"You are my everything (Inst.)"	Major Leaguer	Major Leaguer, Heo Youngjin	Lim Sungheeof Hansal Difference	3:40
Total length:					6:80

=== Part 7 ===
Released on November 15, 2020
No.	Title	Lyrics	Music	Artist	Length
1.	"I'm behind you" (모닝커피)	Win-win, Morning Coffee	Victory and Undefeated, Yoo Ji-hee, 1L2L	Morning Coffee	3:19
2.	"I'm behind you (Inst.)"	Win-win, Morning Coffee	Victory and Undefeated, Yoo Ji-hee, 1L2L	Morning Coffee	3:19
Total length:					6:38

=== Part 8 ===
Released on November 21, 2020
No.	Title	Lyrics	Music	Artist	Length
1.	"Pretending to be crazy" (코다 브릿지)	Counter Punch, Park Yeji	Park Yeji	Coda Bridge	3:47
2.	"Pretending to be crazy (Inst.)"		Park Yeji		3:47
Total length:					7:34

=== Part 9 ===
Released on November 28, 2020
No.	Title	Lyrics	Music	Artist	Length
1.	"My Heart's Jewel Box" (조문근)	Lee Joo-ho	Lee Joo-ho	Cho Moon-geun	3:55
2.	"My Heart's Jewel Box (Inst.)"		Lee Joo-ho		3:55
Total length:					7:50

=== Part 10 ===
Released on December 5, 2020
No.	Title	Lyrics	Music	Artist	Length
1.	"Why did you do that" (리디아)	Victory (필승불패)	Unbeatable, Yuk Sang-hee, 1L2L	Lydia	3:32
2.	"Why did you do that (Inst.)"		Unbeatable, Yuk Sang-hee, 1L2L		3:32
Total length:					6:64

=== Part 11 ===
Released on December 6, 2020
No.	Title	Lyrics	Music	Artist	Length
1.	"I still love you" (김민울)	Victory and Defeat (필승불패)	Victory (필승불패)	Minwool Kim	4:04
2.	"Because I Love You Still (Inst.)"				4:04
Total length:					8:08

=== Part 12 ===
Released on December 12, 2020
No.	Title	Lyrics	Music	Artist	Length
1.	"I remember your sad eyes" (비비안)	Victory and Defeat	Victory and Defeat, Yu Yu, 1L2L	Vivian (BBAHN)	3:47
2.	"Remember Your Sad Eyes (Inst.)"		Victory and Defeat, Yu Yu, 1L2L		3:47
Total length:					7:34

=== Part 13 ===
Released on December 13, 2020
No.	Title	Lyrics	Music	Artist	Length
1.	"Regret (후회)" (황가람)	Garam Whang, Seungho Nam	Garam Whang, Seungho Nam	Whang	3:57
2.	"Regret (Inst.)"		Garam Whang, Seungho Nam		3:57
Total length:					7:54

=== Part 14 ===
Released on December 19, 2020
No.	Title	Lyrics	Music	Artist	Length
1.	"All of you and me"	Garam Hwang, Jinyoung Gu	Garam Hwang, Jinyoung Gu	Kim Gil Joong	3:52
2.	"All of you and me (Inst.)"		Garam Hwang, Jinyoung Gu		3:52
Total length:					7:44

=== Part 15 ===
Released on December 20, 2020
No.	Title	Lyrics	Music	Artist	Length
1.	"I didn't know it was so hard"	Victory and Undefeated	Victory and Undefeated, Yu Yuk-hee, 1L2L	Han Kyung-il	3:54
2.	"I didn't know it was so hard (Inst.)"		Victory and Undefeated, Yu Yuk-hee, 1L2L		3:54
Total length:					7:48

=== Part 16 ===
Released on December 25, 2020
No.	Title	Lyrics	Music	Artist	Length
1.	"I just look away"	Win-and-win, Jamie	Win-and-win, Jamie	RAN	3:29
2.	"I only look at it from a distance (Inst.)"		Win-and-win, Jamie		3:29
Total length:					6:58

=== Part 17 ===
Released on December 26, 2020
No.	Title	Lyrics	Music	Artist	Length
1.	"I miss you on a lonely night" (Chorus: Kim Gyeong - beom)	Kang Won-seok, coma	Algoboni, coma	Ryu Ji-kwang	3:52
2.	"I miss you on a lonely night (Inst.)"		Algoboni, coma		3:52
Total length:					7:44

=== Part 18 ===
Released on December 27, 2020
No.	Title	Lyrics	Music	Artist	Length
1.	"Fingertips"	Kang Woo- kyung	Park Hyun-am	Osong	3:52
2.	"Fingertips (Inst.)"		Park Hyun-am		3:52
Total length:					7:44

=== Part 19 ===
Released on January 2, 2021
No.	Title	Lyrics	Music	Artist	Length
1.	"I call you love" (Chorus: Kyungbum Kim)	Coma	Algoni, coma, Choi Chul-hoon	Sin-yu	4:15
2.	"Love, I Call You (Inst.)"				4:15
Total length:					8:30

=== Part 20 ===
Released on January 3, 2021
No.	Title	Lyrics	Music	Artist	Length
1.	"Cry again"	Kang Woo-kyung, Park Hyun-am	Kang Woo-kyung, Park Hyun-am	Lee Jaemin	3:52
2.	"Crying again (Inst.)"		Kang Woo-kyung, Park Hyun-am		3:52
Total length:					7:44

=== Part 21 ===
Released on January 9, 2021
No.	Title	Lyrics	Music	Artist	Length
1.	"I can't forget everything"	Victory, Undefeated	Undefeated Victory, Yu Yuk-hee, 1L2L	Woo Yi Kyung	3:15
2.	"I can't forget everything (Inst.)"		Undefeated Victory, Yu Yuk-hee, 1L2L		3:15
Total length:					6:30

=== Part 22 ===
Released on January 10, 2021
No.	Title	Lyrics	Music	Artist	Length
1.	"Why are you so sad"	Victory, Undefeated	Undefeated, 1L2L	Soyoung	3:26
2.	"Why are you so sad (Inst.)"		Undefeated, 1L2L		3:26
Total length:					6:52

=== Part 23 ===
Released on January 16, 2021
No.	Title	Lyrics	Music	Artist	Length
1.	"How are you doing this I can't believe everything"	Victory and Defeat	Victory and Defeat	Blusher	3:02
2.	"How are you doing this I can't believe everything (Inst.)"		Victory and Defeat		3:02
Total length:					6:04

=== Part 24 ===
Released on January 17, 2021
No.	Title	Lyrics	Music	Artist	Length
1.	"Now what do I do"	Victory and Defeat	Victory and Defeat	Cheon Soa	3:36
2.	"What Should I Do Now (Inst.)"		Victory and Defeat		3:36
Total length:					7:12

=== Part 25 ===
Released on January 23, 2021
No.	Title	Lyrics	Music	Artist	Length
1.	"The Rainy Season"	Major Leaguer, Seonghyun	Major Leaguer, Chiyong Park	Kim Young-min (Taesa Ja)	3:50
2.	"The Rainy Season (Inst.)"		Major Leaguer, Chiyong Park		3:50
Total length:					7:40

=== Part 26 ===
Released on January 24, 2021
No.	Title	Lyrics	Music	Artist	Length
1.	"You are my everything"	Tae Geun Kim	Euiyong Kim	Prin	3:49
2.	"You are my everything (Inst.)"		Euiyong Kim		3:49
Total length:					7:38

=== Part 27 ===
Released on January 30, 2021
No.	Title	Lyrics	Music	Artist	Length
1.	"Love always crosses with my heart"	Hojoong Kim, Major Leaguer	Hojoong Kim, Major Leaguer	Kim Iljin	3:50
2.	"Love always crosses with my heart (Inst.)"		Hojoong Kim, Major Leaguer		3:50
Total length:					7:40

=== Part 28 ===
Released on January 31, 2021
No.	Title	Lyrics	Music	Artist	Length
1.	"Let's break up"	Sunghyun, Major Leaguer	Chiyong Park, Major Leaguer	Jang Hye-ri	4:14
2.	"Let's break up (Inst.)"		Chiyong Park, Major Leaguer		4:14
Total length:					8:28

=== Part 29 ===
Released on February 6, 2021
No.	Title	Lyrics	Music	Artist	Length
1.	"I wish it was a dream (rewind)"	Major Leaguer	Major Leaguer	Ariel	4:36
2.	"I wish it was a dream (rewind) (Inst.)"		Major Leaguer		4:36
Total length:					9:12

=== Part 30 ===
Released on February 7, 2021
No.	Title	Lyrics	Music	Artist	Length
1.	"To me"	Major Leaguer, Minhee Yoon	Major Leaguer, Buzzer Beater	With You	3:11
2.	"To me (Inst.)"		Major Leaguer, Buzzer Beater		3:11
Total length:					6:22

=== Part 31 ===
Released on February 11, 2021
No.	Title	Lyrics	Music	Artist	Length
1.	"Miss"	Kang Woo-kyung, Kim Jin-woong	Kim Jin-woong	Kim Jin-woong	4:18
2.	"I Miss You (Inst.)"		Kim Jin-woong		4:18
Total length:					8:36

=== Part 32 ===
Released on February 12, 2021
No.	Title	Lyrics	Music	Artist	Length
1.	"1 minute 1 second"	Kang Woo-kyung	Choi Byeong-chang	Kwon Min-je	3:16
2.	"1 minute 1 second (Inst.)"		Choi Byeong-chang		3:16
Total length:					6:32

=== Part 33 ===
Released on February 20, 2021
No.	Title	Lyrics	Music	Artist	Length
1.	"I promise you"	Garam Hwang, Jinyoung Gu	Garam Hwang, Jinyoung Gu	Lee Gyu-ra	3:53
2.	"I promise you" (Inst.)		Garam Hwang, Jinyoung Gu		3:53
Total length:					7:46

=== Part 34 ===
Released on February 21, 2021
No.	Title	Lyrics	Music	Artist	Length
1.	"All for you" ((Feat. Cindy (Zero Six), Raeun (Chic Angel)))	Raeun (Chic Angel)	Lee Hyun-soo	Outing	3:30
2.	"All for you" (Inst.)		Lee Hyun-soo		3:30
Total length:					7:00

=== Part 35 ===
Released on March 6, 2021
No.	Title	Lyrics	Music	Artist	Length
1.	"Even if it hurts or sad"	알고보니혼수상태, Ellusive	알고보니혼수상태, Ellusive	Kim Joo-young	4:07
2.	"Even if it hurts or sad" (Inst.)				4:07
Total length:					8:14

=== Part 36 ===
Released on March 21, 2021
No.	Title	Lyrics	Music	Artist	Length
1.	"Love, farewell Was the Same"	Bad Boss, Kaiser	Bad Boss, Kaiser	Club Soul	4.00
2.	"Love, farewell Was the Same" (Inst.)		Bad Boss, Kaiser		4:00
Total length:					8:00

== Viewership ==
Audience response

As per Nielsen Korea, the 101st episode logged a national average viewership of 22.4% with 3.6 million viewers watching the episode, thereby taking the series at 23rd place among 'Top 50 series per nationwide viewers in Korea'.

No Matter What : South Korea viewers per episode (millions)

Episodes	Episode number																			
Episodes	1	2	3	4	5	6	7	8	9	10	11	12	13	14	15	16	17	18	19	20
Ep.01-20	2.879	2.552	2.451	2.706	2.517	2.642	2.639	2.588	2.775	2.534	2.762	2.597	2.712	2.899	2.612	2.807	2.648	2.466	2.803	2.588
Ep.21-40	2.871	2.549	2.701	2.760	2.579	2.782	2.539	2.761	2.943	2.579	2.936	2.619	2.877	2.933	2.757	3.075	2.896	2.903	3.296	2.927
Ep.41-60	3.200	2.792	3.010	2.963	2.822	3.176	3.017	2.998	3.388	3.180	3.329	3.148	2.980	3.152	3.110	3.318	3.260	3.392	3.467	3.392
Ep.61-80	3.471	3.322	3.413	3.526	3.592	3.552	3.470	3.430	3.596	3.251	3.519	3.266	3.455	3.511	3.408	3.584	3.398	TBD	3.500	3.541
Ep.81-100	3.443	3.296	3.254	3.469	3.361	3.496	3.309	3.418	2.803	2.746	3.543	3.552	3.470	3.582	3.408	3.491	3.275	3.457	3.534	3.254
Ep.101-120	3.599	3.323	3.314	3.490	3.418	3.496	3.389	3.501	3.510	3.465	3.319	3.273	3.446	3.483	3.393	3.494	3.537	3.354	3.390	3.281

Source: Audience measurement performed nationwide by °Nielsen Korea.

Average TV viewership ratings°(Analysis criteria: 13 regions nationwide, households, unit:%)°°(Analysis criteria: metropolitan area, household, unit:%)
Ep.	Original broadcast date	Average audience share (Nielsen Korea)		
Ep.	Original broadcast date	°Nationwide	Rank	°°Seoul
1	October 12, 2020	18.6%	1	16.8%
2	October 13, 2020	15.6%	1	14.4%
3	October 14, 2020	16%	1	14.6%
4	October 15, 2020	17.7%	1	16.6%
5	October 16, 2020	16.2%	1	15.4%
6	October 19, 2020	17.1%	1	15.4%
7	October 20, 2020	16.0%	1	15.1%
8	October 21, 2020	16.9%	1	15.7%
9	October 22, 2020	18.4%	1	16.8%
10	October 23, 2020	16.3%	1	15.0%
11	October 26, 2020	17.8%	1	17.1%
12	October 27, 2020	16.1%	1	15.1%
13	October 28, 2020	17.0%	1	15.5%
14	October 29, 2020	18.8%	1	17.2%
15	October 30, 2020	16.8%	1	15.0%
16	November 2, 2020	17.7%	1	16.2%
17	November 3, 2020	16.8%	1	15.3%
18	November 4, 2020	16.4	1	15.2%
19	November 5, 2020	17.3	1	16.5%
20	November 6, 2020	16.7%	1	15.2%
21	November 9, 2020	17.7%	1	16.0%
22	November 10, 2020	15.8%	1	14.2%
23	November 11, 2020	16.7%	1	15.1%
24	November 12, 2020	17.2%	1	15.9%
25	November 13, 2020	15.8%	1	14.5%
26	November 16, 2020	17.7%	1	15.9%
27	November 17, 2020	16.5%	1	15.3%
28	November 18, 2020	17.3%	1	16.0%
29	November 19, 2020	17.8%	1	16.1%
30	November 20, 2020	15.9%	1	14.7%
31	November 23, 2020	18.9%	1	17.0%
32	November 24, 2020	17.1%	1	15.1%
33	November 25, 2020	18.5%	1	17.1%
34	November 26, 2020	18.9%	1	17.8%
35	November 27, 2020	17.2%	1	16.3%
36	November 30, 2020	19.3%	1	17.6%
37	December 1, 2020	18.2%	2	16.7%
38	December 2, 2020	18.6%	1	17.1%
39	December 3, 2020	20.1%	1	19.0%
40	December 4, 2020	18.0%	1	16.4%
41	December 7, 2020	19.5%	2	17.8%
42	December 8, 2020	18.2%	2	16.3%
43	December 9, 2020	19%	1	17%
44	December 10, 2020	19.1%	1	17.6%
45	December 11, 2020	18.1%	1	16.3%
46	December 14, 2020	19.7%	2	18%
47	December 15, 2020	19.1%	3	17.4%
48	December 16, 2020	18.7%	1	16.7%
49	December 17, 2020	21.2%	1	19.5%
50	December 18, 2020	19.7%	1	17.9%
51	December 21, 2020	21.0%	2	19.4%
52	December 22, 2020	19.4%	2	17.4%
53	December 23, 2020	19.6%	1	17.9%
54	December 24, 2020	19.8%	1	18.6%
55	December 25, 2020	18.7%	1	16.7%
56	December 28, 2020	20.9%	2	18.8%
57	December 29, 2020	20.3%	3	18.6%
58	December 30, 2020	21.2%	1	19.7%
59	December 31, 2020	20.8%	1	19.4%
60	January 1, 2021	20.1%	1	18.1%
61	January 4, 2021	20.9%	2	18.7%
62	January 5, 2021	20.4%	3	18.2%
63	January 6, 2021	20.8%	1	18.4%
64	January 7, 2021	21.6%	1	19.3%
65	January 8, 2021	22%	1	19.9%
66	January 11, 2021	21.3%	1	19.1%
67	January 12, 2021	21.0%	1	19.1%
68	January 13, 2021	20.8%	1	18.8%
69	January 14, 2021	21.8%	1	20.3%
70	January 15, 2021	20%	1	18.6%
71	January 18, 2021	21.8%	1	19.9%
72	January 19, 2021	21.0%	1	18.9%
73	January 20, 2021	21.3%	1	18.8%
74	January 21, 2021	21.8%	1	19.9%
75	January 22, 2021	20.7%	1	18.6%
76	January 25, 2021	22.0%	1	20.7%
77	January 26, 2021	21.4%	1	19.8%
78	January 27, 2021	21.1%	1	
79	January 28, 2021	21.8%	1	20.1%
80	January 29, 2021	20.8%	1	18.8%
81	February 1, 2021	21.3%	1	19.3%
82	February 2, 2021	20.4%	2	18.5%
83	February 3, 2021	20.8%	1	19.4%
84	February 4, 2021	21.3%	1	19.5%
85	February 5, 2021	20.6%	1	18.6%
86	February 8, 2021	21.8%	1	20.3%
87	February 9, 2021	20.7%	1	18.6%
88	February 10, 2021	21.4%	1	19.3%
89	February 11, 2021	16.9%	1	15.7%
90	February 12, 2021	16.3%	1	14.7%
91	February 15, 2021	22.2%	1	20.3%
92	February 16, 2021	22.1%	1	19.9%
93	February 17, 2021	22.2%	1	19.9%
94	February 18, 2021	22.5%	1	20.6%
95	February 19, 2021	20.9%	1	19.9%
96	February 22, 2021	21.5%	1	19.3%
97	February 23, 2021	21.2%	1	19.1%
98	February 24, 2021	21.7%	1	19.7%
99	February 25, 2021	21.6%	1	20.0%
100	February 26, 2021	20.8%	2	19.2%
101	March 1, 2021	22.4%	1	20.7%
102	March 2, 2021	20.9%	1	19.2%
103	March 3, 2021	21.5%	1	19.8%
104	March 4, 2021	21.9%	1	20.2%
105	March 5, 2021	21.5%	2	20.3%
106	March 8, 2021	22.3%	1	20.1%
107	March 9, 2021	20.9%	1	19.3%
108	March 10, 2021	21.7%	1	20.5%
109	March 11, 2021	22.1%	1	19.9%
110	March 12, 2021	21.4%	2	19.8%
111	March 15, 2021	21.3%	1	19.2%
112	March 16, 2021	20.7%	1	18.6%
113	March 17, 2021	21.5%	1	19.5%
114	March 18, 2021	22.1%	1	20.3%
115	March 19, 2021	21.0%	2	19.5%
116	March 22, 2021	22.2%	1	20.0%
117	March 23, 2021	22.1%	1	20.0%
118	March 24, 2021	22.1%	1	20.2%
119	March 25, 2021	22.4%	1	20.1%
120	March 26, 2021	21.4%	3	19.6%
Average		19.70%		17.85%
The blue numbers represent the lowest ratings and the red numbers represent the highest ratings.; The green numbers represent the normal ratings.; N/A denotes that the rating is not known.

== Awards and nominations ==
Year	Award	Category	Nominee	Result	Ref.
2020	34th KBS Drama Awards	Excellence Award, Actress in a Daily Drama	Na Hye-mi	Nominated	
2020	34th KBS Drama Awards	Excellence Award, Actor in a Daily Drama	Kim Yu-seok	Won	
2020	34th KBS Drama Awards	Best Young Actress	Kim Ha-yeon	Nominated	
2020	34th KBS Drama Awards	Best New Actress	Jung Min-ah	Nominated	
