= Jung Min-ah =

South Korean actress (born 1994)

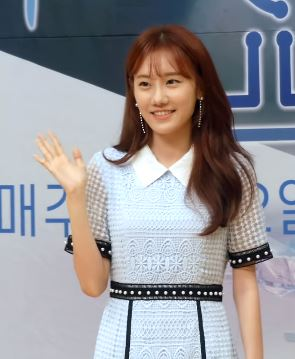
- Jung in 2019
- Born: March 3, 1994 (age 32); Seoul, South Korea
- Education: Chung-Ang University - Theater and Film Studies
- Occupation: Actress
- Years active: 2002–present
- Agent: Vibe Actors

Korean name
- Hangul: 정민아
- RR: Jeong Mina
- MR: Chŏng Mina

Jung Min-ah (Korean: 정민아; born March 3, 1994) is a South Korean actress.

== Filmography ==
=== Film ===
Year	Title	Role	Ref.
2005	Yesterday	young Noh Hee-soo	
2006	Almost Love	young Dal-rae	
2006	Hearty Paws	Seedeng (Lee Jung-hyun)	

=== Television series ===
Year	Title	Role	Notes	Ref.
2002	The Maengs' Golden Era	Park Ha-na		
2003	Something About 1%	Kang Yu-jin		
2003	Damo	young Chae-ok		
2005	Magic Fighter Mir & Gaon	Lee Sara		
2005	Fashion 70s	young Han Kang-hee / Jun-hee		
2005	That Woman	Jung Da-in		
2007	Time Between Dog and Wolf	young Ari / Ji-woo		
2008	Women in the Sun	young Yoon Sa-wol		
2012	Feast of the Gods	young Go Joon-young		
2013	I Can Hear Your Voice	young Seo Do-yeon		
2018	Life on Mars	Cafe employee	Episode 8	
2018	Mr. Sunshine	Yeo-joo		
2018	Feel Good to Die	Lee Jung-hwa		
2019	Doctor John	Kang Mi-rae		
2020–2021	No Matter What	Shin A-ri-A		
2022	Doctor Lawyer	Jo Da-rom		
2023	Poong, the Joseon Psychiatrist	Queen	Season 2	
2026	Mission: Mompossible	Kang Da-mi		

== Awards and nominations ==
Name of the award ceremony, year presented, category, nominee of the award, and the result of the nomination
Award ceremony	Year	Category	Nominee / Work	Result	Ref.
KBS Drama Awards	2020	Best New Actress	No Matter What	Nominated	
MBC Drama Awards	2022	Best New Actress	Doctor Lawyer	Nominated	
