= Lee Cho-hee =

South Korean actress (born 1989)

- Born: October 4, 1989 (age 37); Daegu, South Korea
- Education: Seoul Institute of the Arts – Acting
- Occupation: Actress
- Years active: 2001–present
- Agent: MS Team Entertainment

Korean name
- Hangul: 이초희
- Hanja: 李礎熙
- RR: I Chohui
- MR: I Ch'ohŭi

Lee Cho-hee (Korean: 이초희; born October 4, 1989) is a South Korean actress. She was an ambassador for the 2013 Sangsang Madang Cinema Music Film Festival.

== Career ==
Lee Cho-hee had a career breakthrough with her role as Song Da-hee on the KBS weekend drama Once Again. She won Best New Actress and Best Couple with Lee Sang-yi at the 2020 KBS Drama Awards.

== Filmography ==
=== Film ===
Year	Title	Role	Notes
2001	Sun-young's Letter		short film
2009	St. Jimmy	Jimmy	short film
2011	Bleak Night	Se-jung	Independent film
2011	Broken Pieces		
2013	Born to Sing	Hyun-ja	
2013	Getting an Orientation		short film
2014	Mad Sad Bad	Cho-hee	Segment: "Picnic"
2014	One Summer Night	Ha-neul	short film
2015	Salut d'Amour	Bank clerk	Special appearance

=== Television series ===
Year	Title	Role
2001	Life Is Beautiful	
2002–2004	Dancing Girl Wawa	Cho-hee/Maetel
2014	Inspiring Generation	Mal-sook
2014	Wonderful Days	Seo Jung-ah
2014	Flower Grandpa Investigation Unit	Jung Eun-ji
2014	My Lovely Girl	Joo-hong
2014	KBS Drama Special: "The Reason I Get Drunk"	Yeong-ja
2015	More Than a Maid	Sa-wol
2015	Who Are You: School 2015	Lee Shi-jin
2015–2016	Six Flying Dragons	Gab-boon
2016	Secret Healer	Man-wol
2016	Lucky Romance	Lee Dal-nim
2017	Temperature of Love	Hwang Bo-kyung
2020	Once Again	Song Da-hee
2022	President Jeong Yak-yong	Hong Hee-ae
2025	When the Stars Gossip	Dona Lee/Mina Lee
2025	Newtopia	Park Eun-chae

=== Web series ===
Year	Title	Role
2016	7 First Kisses	Min Soo-jin

=== Variety show ===
Year	Title	Notes	Ref.
2021	Law of the Jungle – Stove League	Cast member (Episodes 434–437)	
2021	Beauty and the Beast	Cast member	

=== Music video appearances ===
Year	Song title	Artist
2012	"Flower Pot"	Yozoh
2013	"I Almost Had It"	Kiha & The Faces

== Discography ==
=== Soundtrack appearances ===
Year	Song title	Notes
2013	"Believe Only Your Eyes"	One Summer Night OST
2016	"Song of Chungsan"	Six Flying Dragons OST

== Awards and nominations ==
Year	Award	Category	Work(s)	Result	Ref.
2017	25th SBS Drama Awards	Best Supporting Actress	Temperature of Love	Nominated	
2020	7th APAN Star Awards	Best New Actress	Once Again	Nominated	
2020	34th KBS Drama Awards	Best New Actress	Once Again	Won	
2020	34th KBS Drama Awards	Best Couple Award with Lee Sang-yi	Once Again	Won	
