= The Preparation =

- Theatrical release poster
- Hangul: 채비
- RR: Chaebi
- MR: Ch'aebi
- Directed by: Cho Young-jun
- Written by: Cho Young-jun
- Produced by: Heo Joong-wook
- Starring: Go Doo-shim; Kim Sung-kyun; Yoo Sun; Park Chul-min; Kim Hee-jung
- Distributed by: Opus Pictures
- Release date: November 9, 2017 (South Korea)
- Running time: 114 minutes
- Country: South Korea
- Language: Korean
- Box office: US$774,031

The Preparation (Korean: 채비) is a 2017 South Korean drama film directed by Cho Young-jun, starring Go Doo-shim and Kim Sung-kyun.

== Plot ==
In Yongin, South Korea, Ae-soon is a mother of the intellectually-disabled In-gyu. Both live in a small apartment and have a happy life, however In-gyu's traits often mildly inflame Ae-soon. One day, after noticing her uncontrollable trembling hands, and bouts of headaches, Ae-soon went for a health check up, and discovered she had cancer, and only had months left to live. Later, she decided to take the lives of herself and her own son through carbon monoxide poisoning by lighting coal indoors in their sleep, but was stopped midway when In-gyu suddenly woke up, and asked to eat fried eggs tomorrow morning. Ae-soon decided not to take her son's life, and would prepare him for a future without her.

== Cast ==
- Go Doo-shim as Ae-soon
- Kim Sung-kyun as In-gyu
- Yoo Sun as Moon-kyeong
- Park Chul-min as Subsection chief Park
- Kim Hee-jung as Jeong-ja
- Hyun Bong-shik as Eun-cheol
- Shin Se-kyung as Kyeong-ran (special appearance)

== Production ==
Principal photography began in Yongin on April 10, 2017, and wrapped on June 7, 2017.
