= Kang Yu-mi (comedian) =

South Korean entertainer (born 1983)

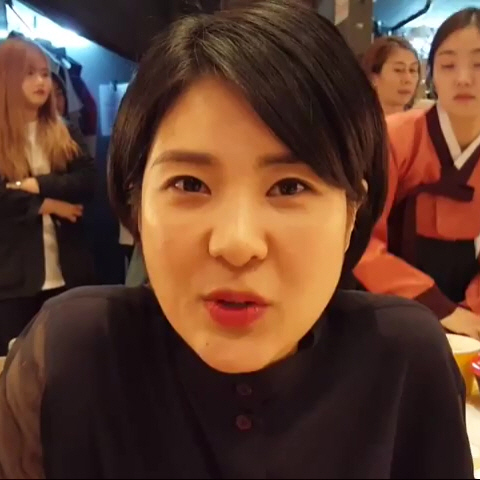
- Kang in 2016
- Born: May 17, 1983 (age 43); Gwangju, Gyeonggi, South Korea

Comedy career
- Years active: 2004–present
- Medium: Television, online video

Korean name
- Hangul: 강유미
- RR: Gang Yumi
- MR: Kang Yumi

Kang Yu-mi (Korean: 강유미; born May 17, 1983) is a South Korean comedian, actress, and YouTuber. She started her career in 2004 through KBS' open recruitment system, and was a cast member of the network's comedy show Gag Concert. In April 2017, she started a YouTube channel, which by 2022 had gained over 1 million subscribers.

== Early life ==
Kang was born on May 17, 1983. She attended Kyunghwa Girls' Middle School and Kyunghwa Girls' High School in Gwangju, Gyeonggi, and was active in both schools's theater clubs. In high school, her mother had to work as her father was in poor health. Because of her upbringing, she paid for her tuition with a scholarship she received from the drama club. For a year, she worked at a department store as a cashier. She took several auditions in hopes of becoming an actress, but gained an aspiration to become a comedian after seeing a Stephen Chow film.

== Career ==
Kang's career as a comedian started in 2002, when she won the grand prize at the 한반도 유머 총집합, a program where citizens could test their comedy skills. Soon after, she was cast in Pokso Club, during her time in which she moved in and out of gosiwons. In Pokso Club, she appeared in the skit "Women's Story" with Ahn Young-mi, but it was not very popular. After failing once, she was selected as one of KBS's 19th generation comedians in 2004, through their open recruitment system. She first gained recognition through her role in the Gag Concert skit "My Girl", becoming known for her confident image and the line "live creatively, you punk", and at the end of 2004, she was awarded Best New Comedian at the KBS Entertainment Awards. In February 2005, Kang and Ahn Young-mi launched "Go Go! Into Art", parodying the conventions of various genres. The sketch ended in February 2006 after running on Gag Concert for over 10 months. After "Go Go! Into Art", Kang continued her reporter character from the previous sketch while also appearing in "Love's Counselor" with Yoo Se-yoon. In July, the Korea Broadcasting Awards named her one of the broadcasters of the year in the comedy category.

== Filmography ==
=== Television series ===
- Famous Princesses (2006), An Gong-ju
- Thirty Thousand Miles in Search of My Son (2007), Park Jeong-na
- Temptation of an Angel (2009), Kim Yeon-jae
- Dong Yi (2010), Ae-jong
- I Need Romance 2012 (2012), shaman (special appearance)
- Reply 1997 (2012), H.O.T. fan club president (special appearance)
- Yumi's Cells (2022), Babi's tongue cell (voice role)

=== Television shows ===
- Gag Concert
- Comedy Big League
- Saturday Night Live Korea (2012–2016)

== Awards and nominations ==
Name of the award ceremony, year presented, category, nominee of the award, and the result of the nomination
Award ceremony	Year	Category	Nominee / Work	Result	Ref.
Baeksang Arts Awards	2010	Best Female Variety Performer	Kang Yu-mi; Gag Concert	Won	
