= Zombie Detective =

2020 South Korean television series

- Promotional poster
- Hangul: 좀비탐정
- Hanja: 좀비探偵
- RR: Jombitamjeong
- MR: Chombit'amjŏng
- Genre: Comedy; Fantasy; Mystery
- Created by: KBS Drama Division
- Written by: Baek Eun-jin
- Directed by: Shim Jae-hyun
- Starring: Choi Jin-hyuk; Park Ju-hyun; Kwon Hwa-woon
- Music by: Ok Jeong-yong
- Country of origin: South Korea
- Original language: Korean
- No. of episodes: 24

Production
- Executive producer: Ki Min-soo (KBS)
- Producers: Park Ji-young; Kim Dong-rae
- Running time: 60 minutes
- Production company: RaemongRaein

Original release
- Network: KBS2
- Release: September 21 – October 27, 2020

Zombie Detective (Korean: 좀비탐정; RR: Jombitamjeong) is a 2020 South Korean television drama series broadcast by KBS2. Directed by Shim Jae-hyun, it stars Choi Jin-hyuk and Park Ju-hyun. It aired from September 21 to October 27, 2020. It tells the story of a zombie and a writer who team up to solve crimes.

== Synopsis ==
Kang Min-ho (Choi Jin-hyuk) wakes up and discovers that he is a zombie with no memories of his past. He trains himself to walk and talk like a human, covers up his scars with makeup, and assumes the identity of private detective Kim Moo-young while trying to solve the mystery of his past. Gong Sun-ji (Park Ju-hyun) is a former investigative journalist who gets hired as a part-time assistant at Moo-young's agency. She discovers Moo-young's zombie secret, and the two team up to solve crimes and discover the mystery behind the existence of zombies.

== Cast ==
=== Main ===
- Choi Jin-hyuk as Kim Moo-young/Kang Min-ho
- Park Ju-hyun as Gong Sun-ji
- Kwon Hwa-woon as Cha Do-hyun

=== Supporting ===
==== World King Agency ====
- Tae Hang-ho as Lee Sung-rok
- Lee Joong-ok as Wang Wei

==== Gong Sun-ji's family ====
- Ahn Se-ha as Lee Tae-kyun
- Hwang Bo-ra as Gong Sun-young
- Sung Min-jun as Lee Joon-woo

==== Gangrim Police Station ====
- Park Dong-bin as Hwang Chun-seob
- Jung Chae-yul as Bae Yoon-mi

=== Others ===
- Lim Se-joo as Kim Bo-ra
- Bae Yoo-ram as Station PD
- Park Sang-myun as Lee Gwang-sik
- Ha Do-kwon as Noh Poong-sik
- Seo Yeon-woo as Yeon-woo
- Uhm Tae-yoon as Um Tae-yoon
- Yoon Ki-chang as real Kim Moo-young

=== Special appearances ===
- Park Joo-yong as Santa suspect (Ep. 1)
- Yoo Min-sang as pizza box man (Ep. 1)
- Lee Seung-yoon as zombie movie actor (Ep. 1)
- Kim Hye-seon as zombie movie actress (Ep. 1)
- Yoo Jae-suk as zombie movie poster actor (Ep. 1)
- Kim Min-kyung as zombie movie poster actress (Ep. 1)
- Kim Yo-han as skin cream CM model (Ep. 1)
- Lee Ga-sub as Oh Hyeong-cheol (Ep. 2)
- Han Hye-ji as Oh Hyeong-cheol's wife (Ep. 2)
- Song Ga-in as trot singer (Ep. 2)
- A.C.E as zombie dancer (Ep. 2–3)
- Shin Yun-sook as Kim Moo-young's landlord (Ep. 2)
- Ok Joo-ri as food cart vendor (Ep. 2)
- Kwon Hae-hyo as movie company CEO (Ep. 2)
- Lee Young-ji as paramedic (Ep. 2)
- Kim Jung-pal as fast center manager (Ep. 3)
- Jang Se-hyun as fast center client (Ep. 3)
- Park Sun-young as Kang Go-eun (Ep. 3)
- Yebin as Yoo Hee-seon (Ep. 3)
- Sam Hammington as Butcher (Ep. 5)
- William Hammington as Butcher son (Ep. 5)
- Ryu Hye-rin as Shaman (Ep. 6)

== Production ==
Zombie Detective is a joint production by KBS, Wavve, and SK Broadband for its B TV service, consisting of 12 episodes. Production company RaemongRaein handled the production of the series. KBS released photos from the first script reading on July 22, 2020, and the main poster of the series featuring all the casts on August 24.

The series is the first original co-production by a terrestrial broadcaster, OTT platform, and IPTV service.

== Release ==
Zombie Detective was first released as video-on-demand (VOD) on Wavve and B TV on September 19, 2020, two days prior to its premiere on KBS2 on September 21.

Wavve and B TV continued to release two episodes at 9:30 PM on the Saturday before the Monday and Tuesday series broadcast on KBS2.

== Viewership ==
Average TV viewership ratings
Ep.	Part	Original broadcast date	Average audience share (Nielsen Korea)
1	1	September 21, 2020	2.9%
1	2	September 21, 2020	3.6%
2	1	September 22, 2020	2.7%
2	2	September 22, 2020	3.0%
3	1	September 28, 2020	2.1%
3	2	September 28, 2020	2.8%
4	1	September 29, 2020	2.0%
4	2	September 29, 2020	2.8%
5	1	October 5, 2020	2.0%
5	2	October 5, 2020	2.9%
6	1	October 6, 2020	2.5%
6	2	October 6, 2020	3.4%
7	1	October 12, 2020	2.4%
7	2	October 12, 2020	3.1%
8	1	October 13, 2020	2.6%
8	2	October 13, 2020	3.7%
9	1	October 19, 2020	2.4%
9	2	October 19, 2020	3.1%
10	1	October 20, 2020	2.0%
10	2	October 20, 2020	2.6%
11	1	October 26, 2020	2.1%
11	2	October 26, 2020	2.2%
12	1	October 27, 2020	1.9%
12	2	October 27, 2020	2.6%
Average			2.6%
The blue numbers represent the lowest ratings and the red numbers represent the highest ratings.; N/A denotes that the rating is not known.

== Awards and nominations ==
Year	Award	Category	Recipient	Result	Ref.
2020	18th KBS Entertainment Awards	Best Challenge Award	Zombie Detective Team	Won	
