= Park Min-ha =

Park Min-ha (Korean: 박민하) is a Korean name consisting of the family name Park and the given name Min-ha, and may also refer to:

- Park Min-ha (singer) (born 1991), South Korean singer
- Park Min-ha (actress) (born 2007), South Korean actress
