= CANVAS N =

South Korean television production company

CANVAS N Co.,Ltd.
- Native name: 캔버스엔
- Formerly: Music Encyclopedia Co. Ltd. ((주)음악백과); Victory Production Co. Ltd. ((주)이김제작단); Victory Production & Company Ltd. ((주)이김프로덕션); Victory Contents (빅토리콘텐츠)
- Type: Limited company (2003 to 2014); Public company (2014 to present)
- Traded as: KRX: 210120; KONEX Component
- Industry: Entertainment; Broadcasting (drama production); Music (soundtrack production)
- Genre: Korean drama
- Founded: April 4, 2003 (as Music Encyclopedia Co. Ltd.)
- Founder: Kim Ki-ho; Lee Sun-mi; Cho Yoon-jung
- Headquarters: 16/F YTN NewSquare, 76 Sangamsan-ro, Sangam-dong, Mapo-gu, Seoul, South Korea
- Key people: Cho Yoon-jung (CEO)
- Products: TV series, soundtracks
- Services: TV series and soundtrack production
- Owner: (source:): Cho Yoon-jung (39.82%); Prometheus Capital (12.41%); SL Company (10.27%); Next Entertainment World (9.87%); Kiwoom Investment Secondary Investment Fund 15 (7.12%)
- Subsidiaries: The Awesome Entertainment Co. Ltd.
- Website: canvasn.co.kr

CANVAS N (Korean: 캔버스엔) is a Korean drama production company based in Seoul.

== History ==
- April 4, 2003 - Music Encyclopedia was established.
- October 2003 - The company's name was changed to Victory Production Co. (later Victory Production and Company). (Note: The Korean name is 이김제작단 (later changed to 이김프로덕션 which has the same English translation). The word 이김 means "to win/to get [a] victory", and is also a word play on the surnames of co-founders Lee Sun-mi and Kim Ki-ho.)
- January 3, 2004 - Something Happened in Bali (20 episodes) aired on SBS TV.
- December 1, 2004 - Stained Glass (18 episodes) aired on SBS TV.
- May 17, 2006 - Smile Again (16 episodes) aired on SBS TV.
- May 16, 2007 - War of Money (20 episodes) aired on SBS TV.
- March 7, 2008 - War of Money: The Original (12 episodes) aired on tvN.
- June 23, 2008 - Night After Night (17 episodes) aired on MBC TV.
- August 19, 2009 - My Fair Lady (16 episodes) aired on KBS 2TV.
- March 31, 2010 - Personal Taste (16 episodes) aired on MBC TV.
- October 6, 2010 - Big Thing (24 episodes) aired on SBS TV.
- July 11, 2011 - Spy Myung-wol (18 episodes) aired on KBS 2TV.
- August 24, 2011 - Can't Lose (18 episodes) aired on MBC TV.
- March 19, 2012 - K-POP Extreme Survival (originally 16 episodes but shortened to 14 due to low viewership ratings) aired on Channel A.
- May 26, 2012 - Dr. Jin (22 episodes) aired on MBC TV.
- November 7, 2012 - Missing You (21 episodes) aired on MBC TV.
- April 6, 2013 - Pots of Gold (50 episodes) aired on MBC TV.
- October 28, 2013 - Empress Ki (51 episodes) aired on MBC TV.
- March 18, 2014 - Wife Scandal (4 episodes) aired on TV Chosun.
- July 14, 2014 - Temptation (20 episodes) aired on SBS TV.
- November 5, 2014 - Mr. Back (16 episodes) aired on MBC TV.
- December 16, 2014 - Initial public offering on the KONEX section of Korea Exchange (210120)
- June 16, 2015 - Girls' Love Story (50 episodes) aired on Daum TV Pot and KakaoTV.
- March 16, 2016 - Goodbye Mr. Black (20 episodes) aired on MBC TV.
- March 28, 2016 - Monster (50 episodes) aired on MBC TV.
- July 2016 - The company's name was changed to Victory Contents.
- November 21, 2016 - Night Light (20 episodes) (Note: Co-produced with HIGROUND under the joint venture Night Light Production Partners) aired on MBC TV.
- March 4, 2017 - You Are Too Much (50 episodes) aired on MBC TV.
- June 2017 - Acquired pay TV channel Senior TV
- August 2017 - Acquired talent agency The Awesome Entertainment
- May 22, 2019 - Angel's Last Mission: Love (32 episodes) aired on KBS 2TV.
- August 2019 - Victory Contents sold Senior TV to Buddhist True Network (BTN).
- December 4, 2019 - Woman of 9.9 Billion (32 episodes) aired on KBS 2TV.
- May 17, 2020 - Kingmaker: The Change of Destiny (24 episodes) aired on TV Chosun.
- May 25, 2020 - Dinner Mate (32 episodes) aired on MBC TV.
- February 15, 2021 - River Where The Moon Rises (20 episodes) aired on KBS 2TV.
- June 14, 2021 - At a Distance, Spring Is Green (12 episodes) aired on KBS 2TV.

== List of works ==
=== Serials ===
Year	Title	Original title	Network	Notes
2004	Something Happened in Bali	발리에서 생긴 일	SBS TV	
2004	Stained Glass	유리화	SBS TV	
2006	Smile Again	스마일 어게인	SBS TV	
2007	War of Money	쩐의 전쟁	SBS TV	(Note: Both the SBS and tvN dramas are based on the manhwa of the same title by Park In-kwon.)
2008	War of Money: The Original	쩐의 전쟁 the Original	tvN	
2008	Night After Night	밤이면 밤마다	MBC TV	
2009	My Fair Lady	아가씨를 부탁해	KBS 2TV	
2010	Personal Taste	개인의 취향	MBC TV	
2010	Big Thing	대물	SBS TV	. (Note: Both Big Thing and the 2013 SBS TV drama King of Ambition (produced by Verdi Media) are based on the manhwa Daemul by Park In-kwon)
2011	Spy Myung-wol	스파이 명월	KBS 2TV	
2011	Can't Lose	지고는 못살아	MBC TV	
2012	K-POP Extreme Survival	K-팝 최강 서바이벌	Channel A	
2012	Dr. Jin	닥터진	MBC TV	co-produced with Kross Pictures
2012	Missing You	보고싶다	MBC TV	
2013	Pots of Gold	금 나와라, 뚝딱!	MBC TV	
2013	Empress Ki	기황후	MBC TV	
2014	Wife Scandal	아내스캔들 - 바람이 분다	TV Chosun	
2014	Temptation	유혹	SBS TV	
2014	Mr. Back	미스터 백	MBC TV	
2015	Girls' Love Story	소녀연애사	Daum TV Pot; KakaoTV	web drama
2016	Goodbye Mr. Black	굿바이 미스터 블랙	MBC TV	
2016	Monster	몬스터	MBC TV	
2016	Night Light	불야성	MBC TV	
2017	You Are Too Much	당신은 너무합니다	MBC TV	
2019	Angel's Last Mission: Love	단, 하나의 사랑	KBS 2TV	co-produced with Monster Union
2019	Woman of 9.9 Billion	99억의 여자	KBS 2TV	
2020	Kingmaker: The Change of Destiny	바람과 구름과 비	TV Chosun	co-produced with HIGROUND (Note: Both Kingmaker: The Change of Destiny and the 1989 KBS 2TV drama Wind and Clouds and Rain (produced by KBS Drama Production) are based on the novel Wind and Clouds and Rain by Lee Byung-joo.)
2020	Dinner Mate	저녁 같이 드실래요?	MBC TV	
2021	River Where the Moon Rises	달이 뜨는 강	KBS 2TV	
2021	At a Distance, Spring Is Green	멀리서 보면 푸른 봄	KBS 2TV	
2021	Desire	욕망	Channel IHQ	Co-produced with IHQ
2022	Jinxed at First	징크스의 연인	KBS 2TV	
2022	Sponsor	스폰서	MBN	
	Curtain Call	커튼콜	KBS 2TV	
2023	The Real Has Come!	진짜가 나타났다!	KBS 2TV	Weekend drama
2024	Perfect Family	완벽한 가족	KBS 2TV	
2026	OK! Let's Get Divorced	그래, 이혼하자	KBS Drama	
TBA	Something Happened in Bali (remake)	발리에서 생긴 일	MBN	Co-produced with AStory

=== Films ===
Year	Title	Original title	Distributor	Notes
2017	One Line	원라인	Next Entertainment World	As an investor only
2017	The King	더 킹	Next Entertainment World	As an investor only
2018	Illang: The Wolf Brigade	인랑	Warner Bros. Korea	As an investor only

=== Soundtracks ===
Year	Title	Distributor
2004	Something Happened in Bali OST	Yedang Company
2004	Stained Glass OST	Yedang Company
2006	Smile Again OST	Yedang Company
2007	War of Money OST	Yedang Company
2008	Night After Night OST	Yedang Company
2009	My Fair Lady OST	Yedang Company
2010	Personal Taste OST	Kakao M
2010	Big Thing OST	T Entertainment
2011	Spy Myung-wol OST	Kakao M
2011	Can't Lose OST	Kakao M
2012	Dr. Jin OST	Kakao M
2012	Missing You OST	Kakao M
2013	Pots of Gold OST	Kakao M
2013	Empress Ki OST	Kakao M
2014	Temptation OST	Kakao M
2014	Mr. Back OST	Kakao M
2016	Goodbye Mr. Black OST	Kakao M
2016	Monster OST	Kakao M
2016	Night Light OST	Kakao M
2017	You Are Too Much OST (Note: co-produced with Mystic Story)	Kakao M
2019	Angel's Last Mission: Love OST	Kakao M
2019	Woman of 9.9 Billion OST	Kakao M
2020	Kingmaker: The Change of Destiny OST	Warner Music Korea
2020	Dinner Mate OST	Warner Music Korea
2021	River Where the Moon Rises OST	Kakao Entertainment
