= Choi Sung-won (actor) =

South Korean actor

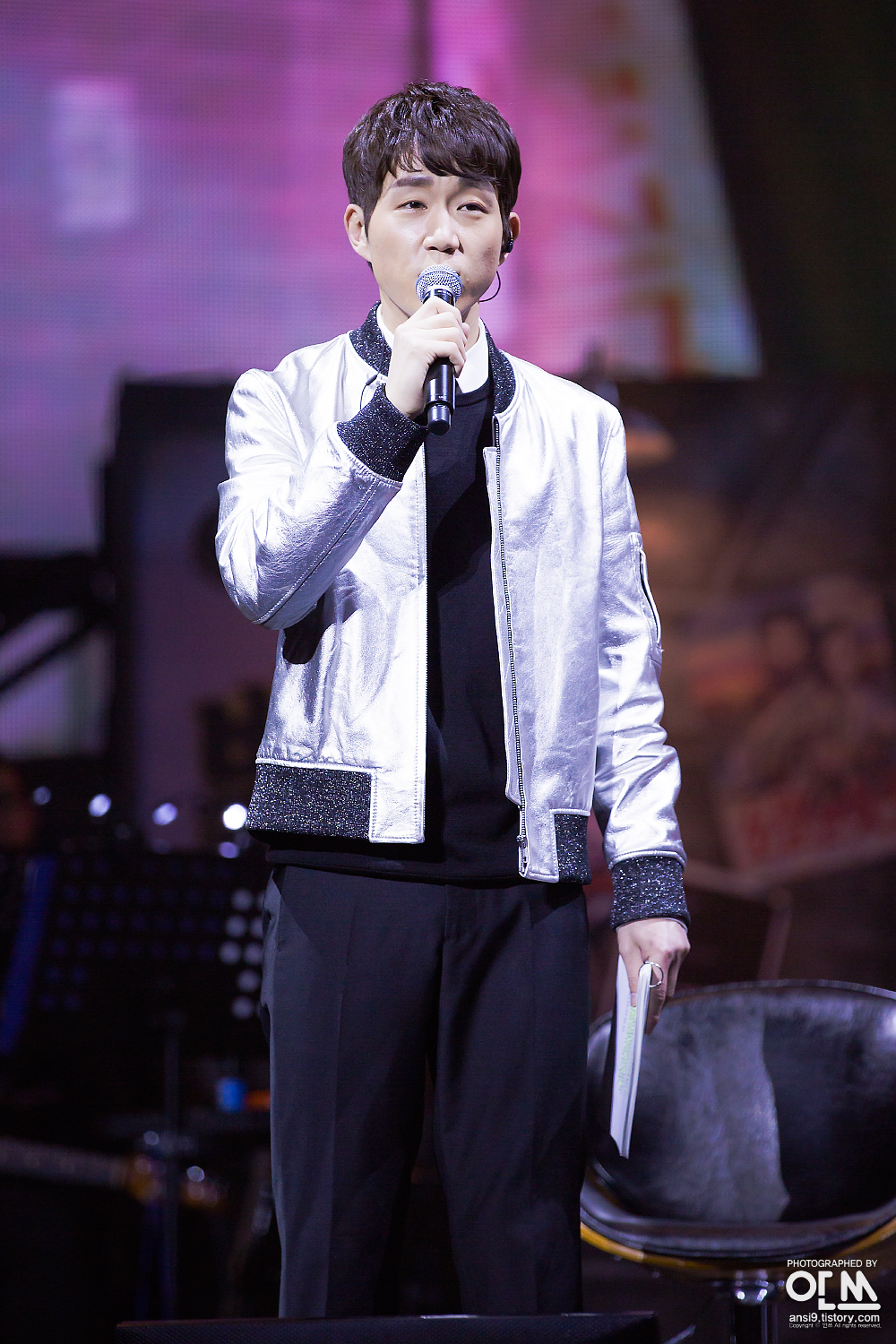
- Choi in March 2016
- Born: Choi Min-woo; January 17, 1985 (age 41); South Korea
- Occupation: Actor
- Years active: 2011–present
- Agent: Wide S Company (2022-present)

Korean name
- Hangul: 최민우
- RR: Choe Minu
- MR: Ch'oe Minu

Stage name
- Hangul: 최성원
- RR: Choe Seongwon
- MR: Ch'oe Sŏngwŏn

Choi Min-woo (born January 17, 1985), better known by his stage name Choi Sung-won, is a South Korean actor. He started gaining recognition through his role as Sung No-eul in the Korean drama Reply 1988 (2015), a third installment of the Reply series by tvN.

== Life and career ==
In May 2016, Choi was diagnosed with acute leukemia. In order to focus on his recovery his agency stated that he decided to leave the drama Mirror of the Witch. In February 2017, it was revealed that his condition is continuously improving and that he will return through a stage play entitled Miracles of the Namiya General Store. In July 2017, his agency revealed that he is completely healed.

On January 18, 2022, it was confirmed that Choi decided to join Wide S Company.

== Filmography ==
=== Film ===
Year	Title	Role	Notes/Ref.
2014	Slow Video	Loan shark	
2015	The Accidental Detective	Rookie	
2017	The Prison		
2018	The Accidental Detective 2: In Action	Jo Young-chul	
2023	The Assassin		
2023	Regardless of Us	Film director	

=== Television series ===
Year	Title	Role	Network	Notes/Ref.
2011	KBS Drama Special: Our Happy Youth	Hyeong-joo	KBS2	
2012	KBS Drama Special: The Disappearance of the Member of Parliament	Go Geum-ha	KBS2	
2015	KBS Drama Special: The Wind Blows to the Hope	Detective Kang	KBS2	
2015-2016	Reply 1988	Sung No-eul	tvN	
2016	Secret Healer	Dong-rae	JTBC	
2017	Prison Playbook	Jo Ki Chul	tvN	
2018	The Miracle We Met	Assistant manager Ha	KBS2	
2018	Gangnam Beauty	Song Jung-ho	JTBC	
2019	My Absolute Boyfriend	Nam Bo-won		
2019	Psychopath Diary	Heo taek-soo	tvN	
2022	From Now On, Showtime!	Min-ho cameo	MBC	

=== Television shows ===
Year	Title	Notes	Ref.
2016	King of Mask Singer	"I'm on the Green Grass in the Meadow" - Ep. 51-52	
2025–2026	Reply 1988 10th Anniversary		

=== Music video appearances ===
Year	Title	Ref.
2025	"Hyehwa-dong (or Ssangmun-dong)"	

== Theater ==
=== Musicals ===
Year	Title	Role	Notes
2007-2013	Finding Mr. Destiny	Peter	
2010	Oh! While You Were Sleeping		
2013	The Goddess is Watching		
2013	Black Mary Poppins	Jonas Engels	

=== Plays ===
Year	Title	Role	Notes
2011	A Dramatic Night		
2017	Miracles of the Namiya General Store		

== Discography ==
List of soundtrack appearances, showing year released, and name of the album
Title	Year	Album
"Hyehwa-dong (or Ssangmun-dong) (혜화동 (혹은 쌍문동))" (Ssangmun-dong Kids featuring Choi Sung-won)	2025	Reply 1988 10th Anniversary OST
