= Make It Big (film) =

- Film poster
- Hangul: 일단 뛰어
- RR: Ildan ttwieo
- MR: Iltan ttwiŏ
- Directed by: Cho Ui-seok
- Written by: Cho Ui-seok
- Produced by: Yoo In-taek; Lee Soo-nam
- Starring: Song Seung-heon; Kwon Sang-woo; Kim Young-jun; Lee Beom-soo
- Cinematography: Kim Cheol-ju
- Edited by: Hahm Sung-won
- Music by: Kim Hyeong-jun; Hwang Tae-gyu
- Distributed by: Korea Pictures
- Release date: May 10, 2002 (South Korea)
- Running time: 120 minutes
- Country: South Korea
- Language: Korean

Make It Big (Korean: 일단 뛰어) is a 2002 South Korean comedy film directed by Cho Ui-seok. Song Seung-heon, Kwon Sang-woo, and Kim Young-jun play three high school students who are startled when a bagful of money and a dead man fall on top of their car. Once they realize just how much money is in the bag, they give up any thought of calling the police.

== Plot ==
Three high school boys seem to have little in common, but one day they happen to sit next to each other at the back of the classroom. They soon become good friends, though they are always arguing or teasing each other. One day as they're jumping over the school wall, a thief falls out of nowhere and passes out right in front of them. He is holding a bag full of dollars. Not knowing what to do, they decide to take the bag first and think things out later. Meanwhile, Ji-hyeong is a rookie detective on his 100th day at the station, and is always busy trying to catch criminals ranging from drug dealers to petty thieves. Hearing that a usurer's house had been robbed, he goes to investigate the case. But he gets orders to close the case, and he starts to get curious. He decides to continue investigating, in secret. Seong-hwan, Woo-seob and Jin-won have long since forgotten how scared they were at the beginning, and they are having a spending spree. Ji-hyeong's investigation brings him closer and closer to them. Meanwhile, others are looking for the bag of cash too, and they are closing in on them fast.

== Cast ==
- Song Seung-heon as Seong-hwan
- Kwon Sang-woo as Woo-seob
- Kim Young-jun as Jin-won
- Lee Beom-soo as Ji-hyeong
- Im Jung-eun as Yoo-jin
- Lee Moon-sik as thief
- Jung Gyu-soo as secretary
- Jung Kyung-ho as policeman
- Lee Ji-hyun as beautiful woman with pet
- Lee Kan-hee as Seong-hwan's mother
- Im Seung-dae as doctor
- Park Jae-woong as gangster
- Marco as James
- Kim Seon-hwa as Versace staff member
- Kim Han as man of shaking head
- Lee Sun-kyun as Woo Jung-chul
- Lee Ji-hyun as Jang-soo
- Park Jin-taek as driver
- Kim Joong-ki (bit part)
- Jo Dong-hyuk (bit part)

== Notes ==
Song and Kwon became close friends in real life, and later starred together again in the 2008 film Fate.
