= Queen of Mystery 2 =

2018 South Korean TV series

- Promotional poster
- Hangul: 추리의 여왕 2
- Hanja: 推理의女王2
- Lit.: Mystery's Queen 2
- RR: Churiui yeowang 2
- MR: Ch'uriŭi yŏwang 2
- Genre: Crime; Mystery; Detective fiction; Comedy
- Created by: KBS Drama Production
- Written by: Lee Sung-min
- Directed by: Choi Yoon-Suk; Yoo Young-eun
- Starring: Choi Kang-hee; Kwon Sang-woo
- No. of episodes: 16

Production
- Executive producer: Lee Sang-baek
- Camera setup: Single camera
- Running time: 70 minutes
- Production company: AStory

Original release
- Network: KBS2
- Release: February 28 – April 19, 2018

Queen of Mystery 2 (Korean: 추리의 여왕 2; RR: Churiui yeowang 2) is a South Korean television series starring Choi Kang-hee and Kwon Sang-woo. It aired on KBS2 from February 28 to April 19, 2018 on Wednesdays and Thursdays at 22:00 (KST) for 16 episodes.

== Synopsis ==
Housewife-turned-investigator Seol-ok and passionate detective Wan-seung collaborate to solve mysterious cases and cure the hearts of those who were wounded by crimes along the way. Queen of Mystery Season 2 is a drama that digs into the inside details of daily crimes realistically about a murder next door and sexual assault crime that happened in a blind alley last night instead of dealing with a psychopath or notorious serial killer, etc.

== Cast ==
=== Main ===
- Choi Kang-hee as Yoo Seol-ok
- Kwon Sang-woo as Ha Wan-seung

=== Supporting ===
- Park Byung-eun as Woo Sung-ha
- Kim Hyun-sook as Kim Kyung-mi
- Lee Da-hee as Jung Hee-yeon / Seo Hyun-soo
- Kim Tae-woo as Ha Ji-seung
- Park Ji-il as Kang Bo-guk

==== Jungjindong Station ====
- Kim Won-hae as Station Manager Jo In-ho
- Oh Min-suk as Gye Seong-woo, Violent Crimes Division Unit 1 Team Leader
- Hong Ki-joon as Sergeant Yook Seung-hwa
- Kim Jong-soo as Station Chief Shin Jang-gu
- Kwon Mina as Officer Shin Nara, Shin Jang-gu's daughter

==== Mystery Squad ====
- Kim Min-sang as Team Leader Hwang Jae-min
- Min Sung-uk as Corporal Gong Han-min
- DinDin as MC J Bang Jae-soon
- Jang Yoo-sang as Kim Mun-gi
- Kim Jong-hyeon as Officer Lee Seon-ho
- Jo Woo-ri as Yoon Mi-joo

==== Others ====
- Hwang Young-hee as Park Kyung-ja
- Lee Ji-hyun as Lee Young-sook
- Jang In-sub as Im Woo-cheol
- Kwon Hyuk-hyun as a police officer.
- Kim Jin-yeop as Lee In-ho

=== Special appearance ===
- Lee Yong-nyeo as one of the Baebangdong women
- Park Joon-geum as Park Kyung-suk, Seol-ok's (former) mother-in-law
- Jung In-gi as Corporal Jang Woo-seob, Baebangdong-2 officer
- Ahn Gil-kang as Bae Kwang-tae, Seodong Station Violent Crimes Division Unit 2 Team Leader
- Jeon Soo-kyeong as Nam Bok-soon
- Lee Seon-hee as Seon-hui (from Season 1)
- Hwang In-seong
- Lee Ji-ae
- Jang Gwang as Ha Jae-ho, Wan-seung's father
- Hong Soo-hyun as Joo Hyun-ah
- Cha Myeong-uk
- Dong Ha as Park Ki-bum

== Production ==
- First script reading took place on December 22, 2017 at KBS Annex Broadcasting Station in Yeouido, South Korea.

== Original soundtrack ==
=== Part 1 ===
Released on March 1, 2018
No.	Title	Lyrics	Music	Artist	Length
1.	"SARR" (사르르)	Ahn Young-ran, Son Yeon-sung, Ryu Won-kwang	Son Yeon-sung, Ryu Won-kwang	Hyojung (Oh My Girl)	03:08
2.	"SARR (Inst.)" (사르르 (Inst.))		Son Yeon-sung, Ryu Won-kwang		03:08
Total length:					06:16

=== Part 2 ===
Released on March 8, 2018
No.	Title	Lyrics	Music	Artist	Length
1.	"These Days You & I" (요즘 너 요즘 나)	Kim Seon-yeop, Park Se-joon	Burning Potato, Jung Yeon-tae, Park Se-joon	Kei (Lovelyz)	03:39
2.	"These Days You & I (Inst.)" (요즘 너 요즘 나 (Inst.))		Burning Potato, Jung Yeon-tae, Park Se-joon		03:39
Total length:					07:18

=== Part 3 ===
Released on March 15, 2018
No.	Title	Lyrics	Music	Artist	Length
1.	"Don't Know Love" (사랑을 모르고)	Lucia	Lucia	Lucia	03:42
2.	"Don't Know Love (Inst.)" (사랑을 모르고 (Inst.))		Lucia		03:42
Total length:					07:24

=== Part 4 ===
Released on March 22, 2018
No.	Title	Lyrics	Music	Artist	Length
1.	"Dreaming Of Spring (Hibernation)" (봄을 꿈꾸다 (겨울잠))	Kim Soo-jeong	Choi Yong-chan	Eunkwang (BtoB)	03:26
2.	"Dreaming Of Spring (Hibernation) (Inst.)" (봄을 꿈꾸다 (겨울잠) (Inst.))		Choi Yong-chan		03:26
Total length:					06:52

=== Part 5 ===
Released on March 29, 2018
No.	Title	Lyrics	Music	Artist	Length
1.	"Don't Know Whether It Will Melt" (녹을지 몰라요)	Kim Kyeong-beom, Kim Ji-hwan, Lee Jin-shil, Park Se-joon	Kim Kyeong-beom, Kim Ji-hwan, Lee Jin-shil, Park Se-joon	Younha	02:53
2.	"Don't Know Whether It Will Melt (Inst.)" (녹을지 몰라요 (Inst.))		Kim Kyeong-beom, Kim Ji-hwan, Lee Jin-shil, Park Se-joon		02:53
Total length:					05:46

=== Part 6 ===
Released on April 4, 2018
No.	Title	Lyrics	Music	Artist	Length
1.	"Stay"	Major Leaguer, Park Se-joon	Major Leaguer, Choi Hyun-cheol, Park Se-joon	Ulala Session	03:40
2.	"Stay (Inst.)"		Major Leaguer, Choi Hyun-cheol, Park Se-joon		03:40
Total length:					07:20

=== Part 7 ===
Released on April 5, 2018
No.	Title	Lyrics	Music	Artist	Length
1.	"Desire And Hope" (원하고 원망하죠)	Yoon Sa-ra	Shin Jae-hong	ZiA	03:45
2.	"Desire And Hope (Inst.)" (원하고 원망하죠 (Inst.))		Shin Jae-hong		03:45
Total length:					07:30

=== Part 8 ===
Released on April 11, 2018
No.	Title	Lyrics	Music	Artist	Length
1.	"The Path Leading To Home (feat. Park Hyo-joon)" (집으로 오는 길 (Feat. 박효준))	Kim Kyeong-beom, Kim Ji-hwan, Park Se-joon	Kim Kyeong-beom, Park Se-joon	Jiyeon (T-ara)	03:14
2.	"The Path Leading To Home (Inst.)" (집으로 오는 길 (Inst.))		Kim Kyeong-beom, Park Se-joon		03:14
Total length:					06:28

=== Part 9 ===
Released on April 12, 2018
No.	Title	Lyrics	Music	Artist	Length
1.	"I Still Love You" (여전히 사랑하고 있어)	Kim Kyeong-beom, Park Se-joon	Kim Kyeong-beom, Kim Ji-hwan, Park Se-joon	Seo In-young	03:36
2.	"I Still Love You (Inst.)" (여전히 사랑하고 있어 (Inst.))		Kim Kyeong-beom, Park Se-joon		03:36
Total length:					07:12

=== Part 10 ===
Released on April 18, 2018
No.	Title	Lyrics	Music	Artist	Length
1.	"Stay" (남아)	Oh Seong-hoon	Oh Seong-hoon, Kim Seong-tae, Park Ga-young	J-Cera	03:30
2.	"Stay (Inst.)" (남아 (Inst.))		Oh Seong-hoon, Kim Seong-tae, Park Ga-young		03:30
Total length:					07:00

=== Part 11 ===
Released on April 19, 2018
No.	Title	Lyrics	Music	Artist	Length
1.	"Cannot Live Without You" (너 없인 못살것 같더니)	Kim Kyeong-beom, Park Se-joon	Kim Kyeong-beom, Kim Ji-hwan, Park Se-joon	MONNI	04:12
2.	"Cannot Live Without You (Inst.)" (너 없인 못살것 같더니 (Inst.))		Kim Kyeong-beom, Park Se-joon		04:12
Total length:					08:24

== Ratings ==
- In the table below, the blue numbers represent the lowest ratings and the red numbers represent the highest ratings.
- NR denotes that the drama did not rank in the top 20 daily programs on that date.

Ep.	Original broadcast date	Average audience share			
Ep.	Original broadcast date	TNmS		AGB Nielsen	
Ep.	Original broadcast date	Nationwide	Seoul	Nationwide	Seoul
1	February 28, 2018	6.1% (NR)	6.5%	5.9% (NR)	6.3% (NR)
2	March 1, 2018	7.6% (20th)	7.7%	6.5% (20th)	6.4% (20th)
3	March 7, 2018	5.4% (NR)	5.6%	4.7% (NR)	4.9% (NR)
4	March 8, 2018	6.2% (NR)	7.3%	4.8% (NR)	5.8% (NR)
5	March 14, 2018	6.0% (20th)	6.1%	5.2% (19th)	5.2% (20th)
6	March 15, 2018	5.8% (NR)	5.9%	5.6% (NR)	5.7% (20th)
7	March 21, 2018	6.4% (NR)	6.6%	4.7% (NR)	4.9% (NR)
8	March 22, 2018	6.2% (20th)	6.3%	4.7% (NR)	4.8% (NR)
9	March 28, 2018	7.6% (13th)	7.9%	6.8% (14th)	6.5% (15th)
10	March 29, 2018	6.6% (18th)	6.8%	6.7% (14th)	6.5% (14th)
11	April 4, 2018	7.1% (15th)	7.2%	6.6% (16th)	6.6% (15th)
12	April 5, 2018	6.7% (17th)	7.0%	6.6% (17th)	5.9% (18th)
13	April 11, 2018	7.8% (12th)	8.1%	7.2% (10th)	6.8% (11th)
14	April 12, 2018	7.5% (15th)	8.9%	7.3% (12th)	7.2% (12th)
15	April 18, 2018	7.4% (15th)	7.5%	7.2% (11th)	7.2% (9th)
16	April 19, 2018	8.1% (11th)	8.4%	7.8% (11th)	7.5% (10th)
Average		6.8%	7.1%	6.1%	6.1%

== Awards and nominations ==
Year	Award	Category	Recipient	Result	Ref.
2018	2018 KBS Drama Awards	Top Excellence Award, Actress	Choi Kang-hee	Nominated	
2018	2018 KBS Drama Awards	Excellence Award, Actor in a Miniseries	Kwon Sang-woo	Nominated	
2018	2018 KBS Drama Awards	Excellence Award, Actress in a Miniseries	Choi Kang-hee	Nominated	
2018	2018 KBS Drama Awards	Best Supporting Actress	Kim Hyun-sook	Won	
2018	2018 KBS Drama Awards	Best New Actress	Jo Woo-ri	Nominated	
2018	2018 KBS Drama Awards	Best Young Actor	Park Min-su	Nominated	
