= Hong Yeo-jin =

South Korean actress (born 1958)

- Born: February 5, 1958 (age 68); Yeongdong County, Chungcheong Province, South Korea
- Education: University of California - Business Administration
- Occupation: Actress
- Years active: 1987–present

Korean name
- Hangul: 홍여진
- Hanja: 洪如眞
- RR: Hong Yeojin
- MR: Hong Yŏjin

Hong Yeo-jin (Korean: 홍여진; born February 5, 1958) is a South Korean actress and beauty pageant titleholder. Hong's family immigrated to California, United States in 1977, and she began working as a broadcast announcer and commercial model in Los Angeles in 1978. She joined the Miss Korea pageant in 1979, and represented her country at the Miss World pageant that same year. Hong made her acting debut in 1987, and remains active in Korean film and television. She is a breast cancer survivor.

== Filmography ==
=== Film ===
| Year | Title | Role |
|---|---|---|
| 1989 | Lost Love | Kim Jae-yi |
| 1991 | A Middle Aged Woman's Crisis | Oh Hye-jung |
| 1991 | Karma | Sun-rye |
| 1992 | The Foggy Nights of Rio de Janeiro Are Deep | Soo-in |
| 1992 | Dangerous Level | |
| 1992 | The Man Who Always Takes the Last Train | |
| 1993 | The Age of Women Will Never End | |
| 1993 | Eros | Yoon So-hee |
| 1993 | The Season of Sarah | Hyun Ji-hye |
| 1993 | The Blue Nights of Osaka | |
| 1993 | A Girl at the Age of 18 | |
| 1995 | Yellow Handkerchief | |
| 1997 | Father vs. Son | Madam Hong |
| 1998 | First Kiss | Sung-joo's wife |
| 1999 | Route 7 | Shopgirl |
| 2003 | Live or Die | Older sister Wang |
| 2007 | Miss Gold Digger | Dong-min's mother |
| 2008 | Crazy Waiting | Park Won-jae's mother |
| 2008 | 4 Days | Kim Sook-ja |
| 2012 | The Concubine | Court lady Suragan |
| 2013 | Wedding Palace | Na-young's mother |
| 2015 | Love Clinic | Gil Sin-seol's mother |

=== Television series ===
| Year | Title | Role | Network |
|---|---|---|---|
| 1989 | Let's Go, Butterfly | | MBC |
| 1994 | Hero's Diary | | SBS |
| 1994 | Kkachi | | SBS |
| 1995 | Until We Meet Again | | SBS |
| 1996 | Expedition of Men | Yang Myung-boon | SBS |
| 1997 | Women | | SBS |
| 1998 | Letters Written on a Cloudy Day | Madam Oh | SBS |
| 1998 | Paper Crane | | KBS2 |
| 1999 | The Clinic for Married Couples: Love and War | | KBS2 |
| 2001 | Hotelier | VIP guest | MBC |
| 2001 | Happy Thieves | | KBS |
| 2001 | Piano | Mokpo's Neighbor of Han Eok-kwan | SBS |
| 2003 | All In | Bar hostess | SBS |
| 2003 | Fairy and Swindler | | MBC |
| 2006 | A Woman's Choice | Jung Soo-jung's mother | KBS2 |
| 2006 | Love and Hate | Ye Mi-sun | SBS |
| 2006 | 90 Days, Time to Love | Kim Tae-hoon's older sister | MBC |
| 2007 | Thank You | Kang Hye-jung | MBC |
| 2007 | In-soon Is Pretty | Nam So-jung | KBS2 |
| 2008 | Hometown of Legends: "Gumiho" | Lee Hyo-moon's mother | KBS2 |
| 2008 | Temptation of Wife | Mrs. Lee | SBS |
| 2008 | Don't Cry My Love | Min Seo-young's mother | MBC |
| 2009 | Brilliant Legacy | | SBS |
| 2009 | Hometown of Legends: "Surrogate Mother" | Ho-seung's mother/ Her Royal Highness Princess | KBS2 |
| 2009 | Can Anyone Love | Ahn Dae-sook | SBS |
| 2009 | Enjoy Life | Mrs. Oh | MBC |
| 2009 | Don't Hesitate | Hong Na-ryung | SBS |
| 2010 | Blossom Sisters | Min Myung-seok's mother | MBC |
| 2010 | Giant | Yang Myung-ja | SBS |
| 2010 | It's Okay, Daddy's Girl | Lee Soon-jung | SBS |
| 2011 | Indomitable Daughters-in-Law | Sang-woo's mother | MBC |
| 2011 | Heartstrings | Han Hee-joo's mother | MBC |
| 2012 | My Husband Got a Family | Bang Go-ok's real mother (cameo) | KBS2 |
| 2012 | Ice Adonis | Julia/Joo Hye-ran | tvN |
| 2012 | Ji Woon-soo's Stroke of Luck | Mrs. Jeon | TV Chosun |
| 2012 | Bridal Mask | Congressman Hyun's wife | KBS2 |
| 2012 | Miss Panda and Mr. Hedgehog | Hwang Jung-rye | Channel A |
| 2012 | The Clinic for Married Couples: Love and War 2 | | KBS2 |
| 2013 | My Kids Give Me a Headache | Lee Young-hyun's aunt (cameo) | jTBC |
| 2013 | King of Ambition | Wife of Ha Ryu's teacher | SBS |
| 2013 | I Can Hear Your Voice | Eo Choon-shim's friend | SBS |
| 2013 | The Scandal | Gong Ki-chan's mother | MBC |
| 2013 | Can't Stand Anymore | Lee Nak-bok | jTBC |
| 2013 | The King's Daughter, Soo Baek-hyang | Noblewoman from Gaya Ki Moon Bureau | MBC |
| 2014 | Temptation | Jung Yoon-seok | SBS |
| 2015 | The Invincible Lady Cha | Mimi | MBC |
| 2018 | I Am the Mother Too | Jo Young-ran | SBS |

=== Variety show ===
| Year | Title | Network | Notes |
|---|---|---|---|
| 2013 | Splash | MBC | Cast member |

== Theater ==
| Year | Title | Role |
|---|---|---|
| 2013 | Women | Geum Naeng-jeong |

== Awards and nominations ==
| Year | Award | Category | Nominated work | Result |
|---|---|---|---|---|
| 1979 | Miss Korea Pageant | Miss World Korea | —N/a | Won |
| 1979 | Miss World Pageant | Contestant | —N/a | Nominated |
| 1993 | 29th Baeksang Arts Awards | Most Popular Actress (Film) | The Foggy Nights of Rio de Janeiro Are Deep | Won |
| 2022 | 1st Wonju Film Festival | Popularity Award | —N/a | Won |
