= The Miracle We Met =

2018 South Korean television series

- Promotional poster
- Also known as: Miracle that We Met
- Hangul: 우리가 만난 기적
- RR: Uriga mannan gijeok
- MR: Uriga mannan kijŏk
- Genre: Romance; Melodrama; Fantasy
- Created by: KBS Drama Production
- Written by: Baek Mi-kyung
- Directed by: Lee Hyung-min
- Starring: Kim Myung-min; Kim Hyun-joo; Ra Mi-ran; Ko Chang-seok; Joseph Lee
- Country of origin: South Korea
- Original language: Korean
- No. of episodes: 18

Production
- Executive producers: Bae Kyung-soo; Lee Sang-baek
- Producer: Lee Jae-sang
- Camera setup: Single-camera
- Running time: 60 minutes
- Production company: AStory

Original release
- Network: KBS2
- Release: April 2 – May 29, 2018

The Miracle We Met (Korean: 우리가 만난 기적) is a 2018 South Korean television series starring Kim Myung-min, Kim Hyun-joo, Ra Mi-ran, Ko Chang-seok and Joseph Lee. It aired on KBS2 from April 2 to May 29, 2018, every Monday and Tuesday at 22:00 (KST).

== Synopsis ==
An ordinary man dies in a car crash, but his spirit awakes inside another man with the same name and age but an entirely different background. He becomes the head of two families and agonizes over his two different wives.

== Cast ==
=== Main ===
- Kim Myung-min as Song Hyun-chul (A)
- Kim Hyun-joo as Sun Hye-jin
- Ra Mi-ran as Jo Yeon-hwa
- Ko Chang-seok as Song Hyun-chul (B)
- Joseph Lee as Keum Sung-moo

=== Supporting ===
==== People around Song Hyun-chul (A) ====
- Yoon Seok-hwa as Hwang Geum-nyeo
- Hwang Bo-ra as Song Sa-ran
- Seo Dong-hyun as Song Kang-ho
- Kim Ha-yoo as Song Mi-ho
- Choi Byung-mo as "Ttak-pool" Heo Dong-gu
- Hwang Seok-jeong as Lim Do-hee

==== People around Song Hyun-chul (B) ====
- Lee Do-kyung as Song Mo-dong
- Kim Hwan-hee as Song Ji-soo
- Jeon Seok-ho as Park Dong-soo
- Kim Mi-hwa as Jin-soo's mother
- Lee Eun-saem as Young-ju

==== Shinhwa Bank Staff ====
- Yoon Ji-hye as Kwak Hyo-joo
- Jung Suk-yong as Yook Bang-woo
- Bae Yoon-kyung as Sun Hye-jin
- Choi Seong-won as Assistant Manager Ha
- Lee Moo-saeng as Deputy Department Head Kim
- Lee Bom-so-ri as Seo He-joo
- Park Keun-rok as Park Jong-won
- Jung Han-yong as Kim Sang-jo
- Park Sung-keun as Oh Jang-choon

==== God figures ====
- Kim Jong-in as Ato
- Kim Jae-yong/Kim Jae-kyung as Mao

=== Special appearance ===
- Kim Won-hae as Mortician (Ep. 1, 3, 8)
- Kim Soo-ro as Cathedral priest (Ep. 3, 11)
- Kim Jae-kyung as Mao's other personality (Ep. 3)
- Yoon Da-hoon as Seo Min-joon, psychologist (Ep. 8)
- Jung Sang-hoon as Drama PD (Ep. 9)
- Park Jun-gyu as Song Hyun-chul (B)'s friend
- Kim Min-jong as Kim Man-jong, program MC (Ep. 11)

== Production ==
- The first script reading took place on February 12, 2018 at KBS Annex Building.
- Choi Ji-woo was offered the female lead role but declined.

== Original soundtrack ==
The Miracle We Met OST

Soundtrack album by Various artists
- Released: 2018
- Genre: Soundtrack
- Languages: Korean; English
- Labels: AStory, kakao M
- Producers: Lee Sang-baek (executive), Moon Sung-nam

=== Part 1 ===
Released on April 9, 2018
No.	Title	Lyrics	Music	Artist	Length
1.	"Monochrome"	Moon Sung-nam, Jung Jae-woo	Moon Sung-nam, Jung Jae-woo, SimZ	Bily Acoustie	03:29
2.	"Monochrome" (Inst.)		Moon Sung-nam, Jung Jae-woo, SimZ		03:29
Total length:					06:58

=== Part 2 ===
Released on April 16, 2018
No.	Title	Lyrics	Music	Artist	Length
1.	"Farewell" (이별)	Kil Ok-yoon	Kil Ok-yoon	Jung Cha-sik	04:36
2.	"Farewell" (Inst.)		Kil Ok-yoon		04:36
Total length:					09:12

=== Part 3 ===
Released on April 23, 2018
No.	Title	Lyrics	Music	Artist	Length
1.	"Becoming You" (너에게 물들어)	Honey Pot	Honey Pot	Min Chae	3:51
2.	"Becoming You" (Inst.)		Honey Pot		3:51
Total length:					7:42

=== Part 4 ===
Released on May 7, 2018
No.	Title	Lyrics	Music	Artist	Length
1.	"Present To You" (지금 너에게)	Mama Gorilla; Yoon Hee-won	Mama Gorilla; Yoon Hee-won	Jang Woo-ram	3:27
2.	"Present To You" (Acoustic Ver.)	Mama Gorilla; Yoon Hee-won	Mama Gorilla; Yoon Hee-won	Jang Woo-ram	3:27
3.	"Present To You" (Guitar Ver.)	Mama Gorilla; Yoon Hee-won	Mama Gorilla; Yoon Hee-won	Jang Woo-ram (feat. Sam Lee)	3:27
Total length:					10:21

=== Part 5 ===
Released on May 28, 2018
No.	Title	Lyrics	Music	Artist	Length
1.	"More Than Love, Memories Are" (기억이란 사랑보다)	Lee Young-hoon	Lee Young-hoon; Tom and Jerry	Monhv (Green Cacao)	4:36
2.	"More Than Love, Memories Are" (Inst.)		Lee Young-hoon; Tom and Jerry		4:36
Total length:					9:12

== Viewership ==
The Miracle We Met : South Korea viewers per episode (millions)

Season	Episode number																	
Season	1	2	3	4	5	6	7	8	9	10	11	12	13	14	15	16	17	18
1	1.327	1.507	1.880	1.940	1.944	1.758	1.567	1.642	1.997	2.032	1.963	1.878	1.670	1.874	1.718	2.235	2.189	2.198

Source: Audience measurement performed nationwide by Nielsen Korea.

Ep.	Original broadcast date	Title	Average audience share			
Ep.	Original broadcast date	Title	TNmS		Nielsen Korea	
Ep.	Original broadcast date	Title	Nationwide	Seoul	Nationwide	Seoul
1	April 2, 2018	Two Families (두 송패밀리)	7.2% (NR)	7.5%	8.2% (14th)	8.4% (12th)
2	April 3, 2018	Body Rent (육체 임대)	7.4% (14th)	7.8%	9.2% (8th)	9.6% (6th)
3	April 9, 2018	I'm Sorry... (미안해요...)	9.6% (10th)	10.0%	11.2% (5th)	11.6% (4th)
4	April 10, 2018	Identity (정체)	9.6% (9th)	9.8%	10.9% (5th)	11.1% (4th)
5	April 16, 2018	Me, Who Destroys Me (나를 파괴한 나)	10.1% (7th)	10.2%	11.5% (4th)	
6	April 17, 2018	Help Me	9.6% (8th)	9.7%	10.5% (5th)	10.7% (4th)
7	April 23, 2018	Being Himself (송현철 되기)	9.4% (12th)	9.5%	9.7% (8th)	9.3% (9th)
8	April 24, 2018	Only These Words... (이 말 밖에는...)	10.4% (9th)	10.6%	10.5% (7th)	10.4% (4th)
9	April 30, 2018	Point of No Return (돌아갈 수 없는 지점)	9.6% (9th)	10.1%	11.9% (4th)	12.4% (3rd)
10	May 1, 2018	The Present of God (신의 선물)	10.8% (7th)	11.2%	11.9% (4th)	12.3% (4th)
11	May 7, 2018	Love Triangle (세 사람)	9.6% (8th)	9.7%	11.4% (4th)	11.5% (4th)
12	May 8, 2018	My Husband's Wife (내 남편의 아내)	10.0% (7th)	10.1%	11.5% (4th)	11.4% (4th)
13	May 14, 2018	If You Leave Me Now (가지마요...)	9.2% (9th)	9.3%	10.8% (6th)	10.4% (4th)
14	May 15, 2018	He Comes Back! (돌아온 송현철)	9.3% (7th)	9.4%	10.9% (5th)	10.8% (4th)
15	May 21, 2018	He is A Different Person (그는 다른 사람입니다)	9.7% (8th)	9.8%	10.4% (6th)	10.3% (4th)
16	May 22, 2018	The Trigger of Truth (진실의 방아쇠	8.9% (7th)	9.0%	11.5% (4th)	11.2% (4th)
17	May 28, 2018	Destiny Changes (운명이 역동이다	11.6% (6th)	12.2%	12.6% (2nd)	13.0% (1st)
18	May 29, 2018	The Miracle We Met (The End) (우리가 만난 기적 (최종회))	11.4% (6th)	11.8%	13.1% (4th)	13.5% (4th)
Average			9.6%	9.9%	11.0%	11.1%
Special	March 26, 2018	—N/a	3.3%	N/A	3.5%	N/A
In the table above, the blue numbers represent the lowest ratings and the red numbers represent the highest ratings.; NR denotes that the series did not rank in the top 20 daily programs on that date.; N/A denotes ratings that were not released.

== Awards and nominations ==
Year	Award	Category	Nominee	Result	Ref.
2018	6th APAN Star Awards	Best Supporting Actress	Ra Mi-ran	Nominated	
2018	32nd KBS Drama Awards	Grand Prize	Kim Myung-min	Won	
2018	32nd KBS Drama Awards	Top Excellence Award, Actor	Kim Myung-min	Nominated	
2018	32nd KBS Drama Awards	Top Excellence Award, Actress	Kim Hyun-joo	Nominated	
2018	32nd KBS Drama Awards	Excellence Award, Actor in a Mid-length Drama	Kim Myung-min	Nominated	
2018	32nd KBS Drama Awards	Excellence Award, Actress in a Mid-length Drama	Ra Mi-ran	Won	
2018	32nd KBS Drama Awards	Excellence Award, Actress in a Mid-length Drama	Kim Hyun-joo	Nominated	
2018	32nd KBS Drama Awards	Best Supporting Actor	Choi Byung-mo	Nominated	
2018	32nd KBS Drama Awards	Best New Actor	Kai	Nominated	
2018	32nd KBS Drama Awards	Best Young Actor	Seo Dong-hyun	Nominated	
2018	32nd KBS Drama Awards	Best Young Actress	Kim Hwan-hee	Won	
2018	32nd KBS Drama Awards	Netizen Award	Kim Myung-min	Won	
2018	32nd KBS Drama Awards	Best Couple Award	Kim Myung-min & Ra Mi-ran	Won	
