= Love, So Divine =

- Theatrical release poster
- Hangul: 신부수업
- Hanja: 神父授業
- RR: Sinbusueop
- MR: Sinbusuŏp
- Directed by: Heo In-moo
- Written by: Heo In-moo; Yun Eun-kyung
- Produced by: Yoo In-taek
- Starring: Kwon Sang-woo; Ha Ji-won; Kim In-kwon
- Cinematography: Kim Jae-ho
- Edited by: Kim Sun-mi
- Music by: Seul Bi-an
- Distributed by: Korea Pictures
- Release date: August 5, 2004
- Running time: 105 minutes
- Country: South Korea
- Language: Korean

Love, So Divine is a 2004 South Korean romantic comedy film starring Kwon Sang-woo and Ha Ji-won, and the directorial debut of Heo In-moo. Released in Korea on August 5, 2004, the film sold over 1,242,476 tickets nationwide.

== Plot ==
After getting into trouble at their seminary, seminarians Gyu-shik and Seon-dal are sent into the country for a month of service under the elderly Father Nam. Upon their arrival, Gyu-shik meets Father Nam's niece, Bong-hee, who has flown across from the United States to see her boyfriend. However, when her boyfriend ends their relationship, Bong-hee finds herself stranded at her uncle's church with nowhere else to go. At first she and Gyu-shik struggle to get along, but eventually they become attracted to one another, and Gyu-shik is forced to question his commitment to the priesthood.

== Cast ==
- Kwon Sang-woo as Kim Kyu-shik
- Ha Ji-won as Yang Bong-hee
- Kim In-kwon as Shin Seon-dal
- Kim In-moon as Father Nam
- Kim Seon-hwa as Sister Kim
- Jeon Hye-jin
