= Jung Yeon-joo =

South Korean actress (born 1990)

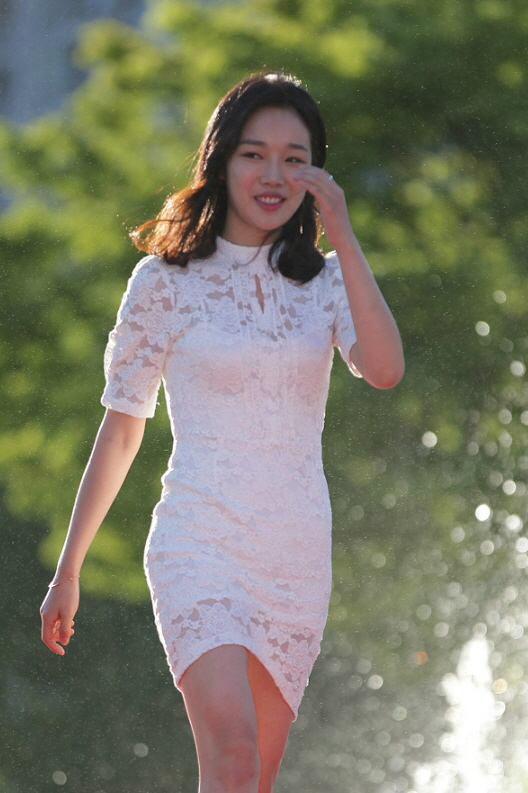
- Jung at the 19th Bucheon International Fantastic Film Festival opening ceremony red carpet, 2015
- Born: Jung Yeon-joo; 13 February 1990 (age 36); Seoul, South Korea
- Other name: Jeong Yeon-ju
- Education: Korea National University of Arts
- Occupations: Actress; model
- Years active: 2010–present
- Agent: JIstory Entertainment
- Known for: Queen of Mystery; Chicago Typewriter; Forest

Jung Yeon-joo (born 13 February 1990) is a South Korean actress and model. Jung is known for her roles in Queen of Mystery, Chicago Typewriter.

== Biography and career ==
She graduated from the Korea National University of Arts and made her debut in the 2011 short movie Guest. She played a small supporting role in drama I Remember You. She then appeared in a number of hit drama series titles such as Queen of Mystery, Chicago Typewriter, and Forest.

== Filmography ==
=== Television ===
Year	Title	Role	Ref.
2012	I Remember You	Song Mi-na	
2012	Dream High 2	Lee-seul	
2012	I'll Give You The Stars and The Moon	Yeon-ah	
2012–2013	School 2013	Student	
2013	Drama Festival 2013: "Surviving in Africa"	Kim Joo-kyung	
2013	Princess Aurora	Han Soo-da	
2014	A Witch's Love	Jung Eun-chae	
2014–2015	Schoolgirl Detectives	Park Se-yoo	
2015	The Superman Age	Herself	
2015	Lily Fever	Jang Se-rang	
2016	On the Way to the Airport	Kang Eun-joo	
2017	Green Fever	Seol-lok	
2017	Chicago Typewriter	Bang-Jin's colleague	
2017	Queen of Mystery	Jin	
2017	Judge vs. Judge	Lee Seon-hwa	
2017	The Best Moment To Quit Your Job	Hye-young	
2018	Room No. 9	Han Hyun-hee	
2020	Forest	Oh Bo-mi	
2020	My Holo Love	Ji-na	

=== Film ===
Year	Title	Role	Language	Ref.
2011	Guest	Ja-gyung	Korean	
2012	A Late Night	Yeon-joo	Korean	
2014	Return Match	Chae-nn	Korean	
2015	Now Playing	Herself	Korean	
2015	Alice: Boy from Wonderland	Soo-ryun	Korean	
2015	C'est si bon	Wardrobe actress	Korean	
2016	Familyhood	Broadcasting station celebrity	Korean	
2017	I Can Speak	Ah-young	Korean	
2017	Baby Beside Me	Sun-young	Korean	
2018	The Accidental Detective 2: In Action	Seo Hee-yeon	Korean	
2018	Beautiful Vampire	Ran	Korean	
2018	Passing Summer	Lee Chae-yoon	Korean	
2019	Kindheartedness Permeates	Min Yoo-ri	Korean	
2021	Night Cruising	Song-i	Korean	
2021	Long Day	Se-mi	Korean	
2021	Tasty Ending	Night Cruise	Korean	
2024	In the Head	Yeon-joo	Korean	

== Awards and nominations ==
- 2011 The 5th Great Short Film Festival Great Actress Award
- 2012 Clermont Ferrand International Short Film Festival Best Actress Award
