= The Accidental Detective 2: In Action =

- Theatrical poster
- Hangul: 탐정: 리턴즈
- RR: Tamjeong: riteonjeu
- MR: T'amjŏng: rit'ŏnjŭ
- Directed by: Lee Eon-hee
- Screenplay by: Jung Han-jin
- Produced by: Mo Il-young
- Starring: Kwon Sang-woo; Sung Dong-il; Lee Kwang-soo; Seo Young-hee; Lee Il-hwa; Choi Deok-moon
- Cinematography: Ki Se-hoon
- Edited by: Han Eon-je
- Music by: Dalpalan
- Production company: Cree Pictures
- Distributed by: CJ Entertainment
- Release date: June 13, 2018
- Running time: 116 minutes
- Country: South Korea
- Language: Korean
- Box office: US$24.3 million

The Accidental Detective 2: In Action is a 2018 South Korean action comedy film and sequel to Kim Jung-hoon's 2015 film The Accidental Detective. The film is directed by Lee Eon-hee, starring Kwon Sang-woo, Sung Dong-il and Lee Kwang-soo. The film was released on June 13, 2018.

== Plot ==
A comic book storekeeper, Dae-man, and the legendary homicide detective, Tae-soo, who met on previous case quit their jobs to open a private detective agency. Despite their high hopes, they soon find themselves with only trivial cases such as spouse infidelity, unpaid debt, and missing cats. Then one day, a woman walks into the office, wanting to find the truth behind the death of her fiancé. Not only that, she also offers them a handsome reward of 50,000 dollars. Dae-man and Tae-soo see it as an opportunity to put their true detective skills to work. They bring on board a third member, Yeo Chi, a Mensa genius and a small-time online private eye, and together they launch a full-fledged investigation on the case. As they dig into what initially appeared to be a straightforward case, disturbing new evidences turn up.

== Cast ==
=== Main ===
- Kwon Sang-woo as Kang Dae-man
- Sung Dong-il as Noh Tae-soo
- Lee Kwang-soo as Yeo Chi

=== Supporting ===
- Seo Young-hee as Lee Mi-ok
- Lee Il-hwa as Noh Tae-soo's wife
- Choi Deok-moon as Kim Jung-hwan
- Nam Myung-ryul as Woo Won-il
- Son Dam-bi as Yoon Sa-hee
- Jung Yeon-joo as Seo Hee-yeon
- Oh Hee-joon as Kim Jae-min
- Choi Sung-won as Jo Young-chul
- Kim Sung-kyu as Lee Dae-hyun
- Park Sung-yeon as Nurse
- Kim Dong-wook as Kwon Chul-in (special appearance)

== Reception ==
The cumulative number of visitors is 3,098,518 and the cumulative sales are KRW 26,479,490,778. The movie has a break-even audience of 1.8 million.

== Production ==
Principal photography began on June 8, 2017, and concluded on September 11, 2017.
