= AStory =

South Korean television production company

AStory Co. Ltd.
- Native name: (주)에이스토리
- Type: Public
- Traded as: KRX: 241840
- Industry: Korean drama
- Founded: January 6, 2004; 22 years ago in Seoul, South Korea
- Founder: Lee Sang-baek; Choi Wan-kyoo; Yoo Cheol-yong
- Headquarters: 361 (Sangam-dong), World cup buk-ro, Mapo District, Seoul, South Korea
- Area served: Worldwide
- Key people: Lee Sang-baek (CEO)
- Services: TV series production
- Owner: As of April 2019: ES Production Co. (16.94%); Lee Sang-baek (16.23%); CJ ENM (13.50%); Tencent (8.06%); JoongAng Ilbo (6.75%); jcontentree (6.75%) WYSIWYG Studios (4.02%)
- Website: astory.co.kr

AStory (Korean: 에이스토리; RR: Eiseutori) is a South Korean drama production and marketing company based in Seoul. It was established in 2004 by Lee Sang-baek, a former producer for Mnet and SM Entertainment, together with his friends: drama writer Choi Wan-kyu and director You Chul-yong.

== List of works ==
One of AStory's alternative logos

=== As production company ===
==== Scripted ====
Year	Title	Original title	Network	Notes	Ref.
2006	Hyena	하이에나	tvN		
2007	Air City	에어시티	MBC TV	with HB Entertainment	
2008	General Hospital 2	종합병원 2	MBC TV	with MOPLUS	
2010	Cinderella's Stepsister	신데렐라 언니	KBS2		
2010	I Am Legend	나는 전설이다	SBS TV		
2010	Please Marry Me	결혼해 주세요	KBS2		
2011	Baby Faced Beauty	동안미녀	KBS2		
2011	Scent of a Woman	여인의 향기	SBS TV		
2011	Protect the Boss	보스를 지켜라	SBS TV	with Protect the Boss Production Partners	
2012	The King's Doctor	마의	MBC TV	with Kim Jong-hak Production	
2013	You Are the Best!	최고다 이순신	KBS2		
2013	Who Are You?	후아유	tvN		
2013	Medical Top Team	메디컬 탑팀	MBC TV		
2014	My Lovely Girl	내겐 너무 사랑스러운 그녀	SBS TV		
2015	The Family is Coming	떴다 패밀리	SBS TV		
2015	Last	라스트	JTBC	with JTBC Studios	
2015	Love on a Rooftop	오늘부터 사랑해	KBS2	with Curtain Call Inc.	
2015	Second 20s	두번째 스무살	tvN	with JS Pictures	
2015	Because It's the First Time	처음이라서	OnStyle		
2016	Signal	시그널	tvN		
2016	Five Enough	아이가 다섯	KBS2		
2016	Fantastic	판타스틱	JTBC		
2017	Queen of Mystery	추리의 여왕	KBS2		
2018	Queen of Mystery 2	추리의 여왕 2	KBS2	with Queen of Mystery 2 Production Partners	
2018	The Miracle We Met	우리가 만난 기적	KBS2		
2018	100 Days My Prince	백일의 낭군님	tvN	with Studio Dragon	
2018	Kingdom	킹덤	Netflix		
2019	My First First Love	첫사랑은 처음이라서	Netflix		
2019	Love with Flaws	하자있는 인간들	MBC TV		
2020	Kingdom 2	킹덤 2	Netflix		
2020	Cheat on Me If You Can	바람피면 죽는다	KBS2		
2021	Jirisan	지리산	tvN	with Studio Dragon and Baram Pictures	
2022	Extraordinary Attorney Woo	이상한 변호사 우영우	ENA		
2022	Big Mouth	빅 마우스	MBC TV	with Studio Dragon and A-Man Project	
2023	The Kidnapping Day	유괴의 날	ENA	with KT Studio Genie	
2023	Like Flowers in Sand	모래에도 꽃이 핀다	ENA		
2024–2026	Crash	크래시	ENA	Two seasons	
2027	Secret Love Tales of Soosung Palace	수성궁 밀회록	tvN		
TBA	The Emperor of Destruction	파괴지황	TBA		
TBA	Riki	리키	TBA		
TBA	UFP		TBA		
TBA	The Badge Brothers: Bounty Hunter	철창살	TBA		
TBA	By the River Swarming with Evil	악이 우글거리는 강가에서	TBA		
TBA	Embers	엠버스	TBA		
TBA	The Girl Goes to Prison	소녀 깜방에 가다	TBA		
TBA	Tiger Lady	호랑이 아가씨	TBA		
TBA	Paradise	파라다이스	TBA		
TBA	Shaman	무당	TBA		
TBA	People of the Blue House	청와대 사람들	KakaoTV	with Kakao Entertainment	
TBA	Something Happened in Bali	발리에서 생긴 일	TBA	remake with Victory Contents	

==== Non-scripted ====
Year	Title	Original title	Network	Notes	Ref.
2021	Saturday Night Live Korea	새터데이 나이트 라이브 코리아	Coupang Play	with Broadway Video and NBCUniversal Global Distribution	
2023	Whiteout	화이트아웃	ENA		
TBA	Idol Show (working title)	아이돌쇼	TBA		
TBA	The Weak Cannot Survive!	약한 자는 살아남을 수 없다!	TBA		

=== As script provider ===
Year	Title	Original title	Network	Notes
2007	Lee San, Wind of the Palace	이산	MBC TV	
2008	The Kingdom of the Winds	바람의 나라	KBS2	
2009	Iris	아이리스	KBS2	
2010	Dong Yi	동이	MBC TV	
2010	Athena: Goddess of War	아테나	SBS TV	

=== As production proxy ===
Year	Title	Original title	Network	Notes
2011	My Princess	마이 프린세스	MBC TV	

== Partnerships ==
=== Soundtrack production and distribution ===
- kakao M (primary partner)
- Plus Media Entertainment
- KVI Multitainment Indonesia
