= Kim Hyun-sook =

South Korean actress and comedian (born 1978)

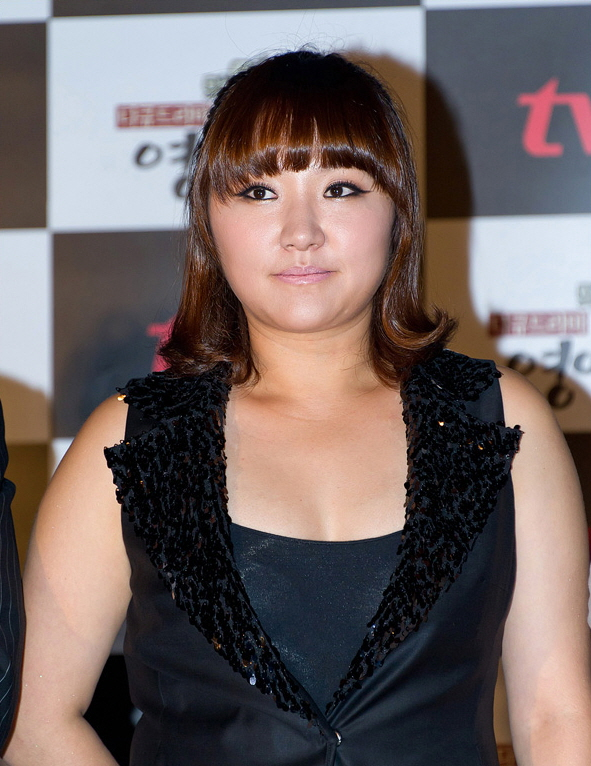
- Kim in 2011
- Born: October 16, 1978 (age 48); Seoul, South Korea
- Education: Kyungsung University - Theater and Film
- Occupations: Actress; comedian
- Agent: Fly Up Entertainment
- Spouse: Unknown (m. 2014)

Korean name
- Hangul: 김현숙
- Hanja: 金賢淑
- RR: Gim Hyeonsuk
- MR: Kim Hyŏnsuk

Kim Hyun-sook (Korean: 김현숙; born October 16, 1978) is a South Korean actress and comedian. She is best known for playing the title character in Ugly Miss Young-ae, a long-running sitcom that depicts the reality of life as a single, older woman in Korea.

== Filmography ==
=== Television series ===
Year	Title	Role	Notes	Ref.
2007–2019	Ugly Miss Young-ae	Lee Young-ae	Seasons 1–17	
2012	Vampire Prosecutor 2	Lee Young-ae	(guest, episode 8)	
2014	Let's Eat	Lee Young-ae	cafe customer (cameo, episode 16)	
2016	Bring It On, Ghost	Shaman	(cameo, episode 16)	
2017	Queen of Mystery	Kim Kyung-mi		
2018	Queen of Mystery 2	Kim Kyung-mi		
2018	Are You Human?	Reporter Jo		
2022	Business Proposal	Yeo Eui-ju		
2022	Alchemy of Souls	Cameo	Episode 10	
2025	Second Shot at Love	Ki-beom's mother		
TBA	Twinkle Shining Oh! Life	Choi Yu-ri		

=== Web series ===
Year	Title	Role	Ref.
2022	Free		

=== Film ===
Year	Title	Role
2001	Friend	Member of 7 Princesses Gang
2002	Champion	Bus driver
2003	An Old Proposal of Marriage (short film)	Ji-soon
2005	Baribari Jjang	(cameo)
2006	200 Pounds Beauty	Park Jung-min
2008	What Happened Last Night?	Hyun-joo
2009	Where is Jung Seung-pil?	Ahn Seong-daek
2009	Sky and Ocean	Ba-da's real mother (cameo)
2011	Spellbound	Min-jung
2013	Tough as Iron	Organ broker
2014	Miss Granny	Park Na-young
2018	On Your Wedding Day	Miss Min (cameo)

=== Variety show ===
Year	Title	Network	Notes/Ref.
2004	Bang Bang	KBS2	
2005	Gag Concert	KBS2	Bongsunga School, 꼭 그렇지만은 않아
2006	Just for Laughs	KBS2	
2007	Infinite Girls	MBC Every 1	
2009	연애불변의 법칙 나쁜남자	O'live TV	
2011	Food Essay	O'live TV	
2012	The World Is Delicious	KBS2	
2013	Lecture 100°C	KBS1	슬픔이여 안녕?
2013	Great In-Laws	jTBC	
2014	A Family Who Left Their Home	Channel A	
2015	Real Men: Female Soldier Special - Season 3	MBC	Cast member
2016	King of Mask Singer	MBC	Contestant as "Sweet Tooth For Chocolate" (episodes 57, 58)
2016	Battle Trip	KBS2	Contestant with Kim Ok-vin (episodes 7, 8)
2021	Honki Club	JTBC	Cast Member

== Theater ==
Year	Title	Role	Reprised
	The Can		
	Like a Flower in the Winter Solstice		
2007	Run Hany	Go Eun-ae	
2010	Nunsensations	Sister Robert Anne	
2011	Ugly Miss Young-ae	Young-ae	2012, 2013

== Awards and nominations ==
Year	Award	Category	Nominated work	Result	Ref.
2003	Kyungsung University Film Festival	Best Actress	An Old Proposal of Marriage	Won	
2005	4th KBS Entertainment Awards	Excellence Award in Comedy	Gag Concert: Bongsunga School	Won	
2007	6th Korean Film Awards	Best Supporting Actress	200 Pounds Beauty	Nominated	
2008	2nd Korea Drama Awards	Netizen Popularity Award	Ugly Miss Young-ae - Season 3	Won	
2011	4th Korea Drama Awards	Special Award for Cable TV	Ugly Miss Young-ae - Season 8	Nominated	
2015	MBC Entertainment Awards	Female Excellence Award - Variety Show	Real Men Season 2 - Female Edition 3	Won	
2018	KBS Drama Awards	Best Supporting Actress	Queen of Mystery 2, Are You Human?	Won	
2022	SBS Drama Awards	Best Supporting Team	Business Proposal	Nominated	
2023	Scene Stealer Festival	Bonsang (Main Prize)	Gaus Electronics	Won	
