= Lee Seung-joon (actor, born 1973) =

South Korean actor

- Born: February 11, 1973 (age 53); South Korea
- Education: Seoul Institute of the Arts (Theater)
- Occupation: Actor
- Years active: 1999–present
- Agent: Jump Entertainment

Korean name
- Hangul: 이승준
- Hanja: 李承俊
- RR: I Seungjun
- MR: I Sŭngjun
- Website: jumpent.co.kr

Lee Seung-joon (Korean: 이승준; born February 11, 1973) is a South Korean actor. Active in theater, Lee is also known for his supporting roles onscreen, notably in the blockbuster epic The Admiral: Roaring Currents (2014), the romance drama Discovery of Love (2014), Descendants of the Sun (2016), Behind Your Touch (2023), Strong Girl Nam-soon (2023) and Castaway Diva (2023).

== Filmography ==
Key
†	Denotes films or TV productions that have not yet been released

=== Film ===
Year	Title	Role	Notes	Ref.
2001	Falling Season		Short film	
2002	I Really Didn't Know	Beom-soo		
2003	Blue	Cheonghaejin worker		
2003	The First Amendment of Korea	Min-seok		
2003	Oh! Brothers	Motel bellhop		
2004	Ice Rain	펍남 1		
2004	Some	Cyber Search crew		
2008	Han River Bridge	Kwang-sik	Short film	
2008	Fate	Jo Hyo-sook's husband		
2009	Handphone	Kang Myeong-sik		
2009	Kiss Me, Kill Me	Detective 3		
2009	I'm in Trouble!	Seung-gyu		
2011	Heartbeat	Doctor Moon		
2011	War of the Arrows	Wan-han		
2012	Doomsday Book	Dad	segment: "Happy Birthday"	
2012	Two Weddings and a Funeral	Kyeong-nam		
2013	An Ethics Lesson	Prosecution investigation officer		
2014	Godsend	Seung-yeon's husband		
2014	Obsessed	Chief medical officer		
2014	The Admiral: Roaring Currents	Captain Ahn		
2014	Whistle Blower	Production Tracking PD 1		
2014	Cart	Section chief Choi		
2022	Vanishing	Dr. Lee	Korean-French film	
2022	The Killer: A Girl Who Deserves to Die	Lee Young-ho		
2025	Sisterhood	Jung Yul-hee's ex-husband		
TBA	Control†	TBA		

=== Television series ===
Year	Title	Role	Notes	Ref.
2010	Golden House			
2012	Dr. Jin	Kwon Ik-joo		
2013	Nine	Han Young-hoon in 2012		
2013	Ugly Miss Young-ae 12	Lee Seung-joon		
2013	Secret Love	Choi Kwang-min		
2014	Ugly Miss Young-ae 13	Lee Seung-joon		
2014	KBS Drama Special – "The Dreamer"	Oh Cheol-oh		
2014	Discovery of Love	Yoon Jung-mok		
2014	4 Legendary Witches	Park Won-jae		
2014	Misaeng: Incomplete Life	Shin Woo-hyun		
2015	Hyde Jekyll, Me	Kwon Young-chan		
2015	Let's Eat 2	Restaurant Owner	Cameo, Ep. 17	
2015	Bubble Gum	Kwon Ji-hoon		
2016	Descendants of the Sun	Song Sang-hyun		
2016	Babysitter	Pyo Yeong-gyun		
2016	Wanted	Jang Jin-woong		
2017	Argon	Yoo Myung-ho		
2017	The Package	Doctor	Cameo, ep. 3	
2018	Mr. Sunshine	King Gojong		
2018	Still 17	Kim Hyun-gyu		
2018	Memories of the Alhambra	Park Son-ho		
2019	He Is Psychometric	Kang Geun-taek		
2019	Hotel del Luna	Doctor	Cameo, Ep. 12	
2019	The Tale of Nokdu	Jeong Yoon-jeo		
2020	Find Me in Your Memory	Kim Cheol-woong		
2020	A Piece of Your Mind	Choi Jin-moo		
2020	Record of Youth	Charlie Jung	Cameo, Ep.1-2, 10	
2020	Hush	Kim Gi-ha		
2021	Undercover	Kang Cheong-mo		
2021	Doom at Your Service	Jung Dang-myeon		
2021	Happiness	Kim Dae-yoon	Cameo, Ep. 12	
2023	Brain Works	Heo Bum-soo	Cameo, Ep. 7-8	
2023	All That We Loved	Yoo’s father		
2023	Behind Your Touch	Cha Ju-man		
2023	Strong Girl Nam-soon	Gang Bong-go		
2023	Castaway Diva	Jung Bong-wan		
2024	Doctor Slump	Psychiatrist	Special appearance, Ep. 1-2, 16	
2024	Love Next Door	Choi Kyung-jong		
2024	Love Your Enemy			

=== Web series ===
Year	Title	Role	Ref.
2023	Bait	Lee Byung-Jun	

=== Music video appearances ===
Year	Title	Artist	Ref.
2003	"Friend"	Ahn Jae-wook	

== Theater ==
Year	Title	Role
	Death of a Salesman	
	Othello	
	The Trojan Women	
	Dood Rock	
1999	Let the Sunlight Shine Upon the Haunted House	
2001	세기초기괴기전기	
2003	The Faeroe Islands at Night	
	King Yebi	
	Crippled	
2004	Plastic Orange	
	Shovel or Axe	
2005	Offending the Audience	
2006	First Ever Story	Man/Ji-yeon
	Not Now, Darling	
2007	Showman Shaman	Hong-mu
2008	Port	Danny Miller
2008	Dandelions in the Wind	Ahn Joong-ki
2009	Les Justes	Stepan Fedorov
2010	Catch Him	Writer Nam Ji-woon
2010	Sleepless Night	Yayoi
2010	33 Variations	Mike Clark
