= Joseph Lee (actor) =

American actor, artist (born 1987)

- Born: Lee Joe-yun; December 29, 1987 (age 38); Arizona, United States
- Occupations: Actor; artist
- Years active: 2011–present
- Website: josephleeart.com

Lee Joe-yun (born December 29, 1987), known professionally as Joseph Lee, is an American actor and artist. He is best known for his role in the Netflix limited series Beef (2023), which earned him a Primetime Emmy Award nomination.

== Career ==
Lee was born in Arizona and raised in Indiana. He started acting in high school. He studied political science with a minor in history at Purdue University in Indiana. He moved to Los Angeles, California, in the early 2010s to pursue acting, but soon additionally took up painting, especially portraits, inspired by inherited photographs of his late father. Though it began as a hobby, art became a significant part of his career as his work developed a following on Instagram.

In 2018, Lee worked in South Korea as an actor in the drama series The Miracle We Met.

Lee played George Nakai, the sculptor husband of Amy Lau (Ali Wong), in the comedy drama Beef, which was released on Netflix on April 6, 2023. He found the show "refreshing" in its layered portrayal of Asian-American life. At the 75th Primetime Emmy Awards, he was nominated for Outstanding Supporting Actor in a Limited or Anthology Series or Movie for Beef.

== Filmography ==
=== Film ===
Year	Title	Role	Notes
2011	Nerve	Eric	
2015	Lion	Ken	
2018	Searching	Peter	
2025	Materialists	Trevor	

=== Television ===
Year	Title	Role	Notes
2014	Rizzoli & Isles	Eric Chen	Episode: "If You Can't Stand the Heat"
2016	NCIS: Los Angeles	Sung Ahn	Episode: "Seoul Man"
2018	The Miracle We Met	Geum Sung-moo	Main role; 5 episodes
2023	Beef	George Nakai	Main role; 10 episodes
2023	Star Trek: Picard	Lt. Mura	10 episodes
2025	Law & Order: Organized Crime	A-Seong Gan	2 episodes
2025–2026	Wylde Pak	Jonathan (voice)	3 episodes
2025	Star Wars: Visions	Jin-Sim (voice)	Episode: "The Bounty Hunters"
TBA	Neuromancer	Hideo	

=== Video games ===
Year	Title	Role	Notes
2026	Call of Duty: Modern Warfare 4	Kal	

== Awards and nominations ==
Year	Award	Work	Category	Result	Ref.
2023	Primetime Emmy Awards	Beef	Primetime Emmy Award for Outstanding Supporting Actor in a Limited or Anthology Series or Movie	Nominated	
