= The Assassin (2023 film) =

2023 South Korean historical action film

- Teaser poster
- Hangul: 살수
- Hanja: 殺手
- RR: Salsu
- MR: Salsu
- Directed by: Kwak Jeong-deok
- Screenplay by: Kwak Jeong-deok
- Starring: Shin Hyun-joon; Lee Moon-sik; Kim Min-kyung
- Production companies: Joy&Cinema Co., Ltd.; TCO The Contents On
- Distributed by: Wide Release Co., Ltd.
- Release date: February 22, 2023
- Running time: 101 minutes
- Country: South Korea
- Language: Korean
- Box office: est. US$25,282

The Assassin (Korean: 살수; RR: Salsu) is a 2023 South Korean historical action-drama film written and directed by Kwak Jeong-deok. Starring Shin Hyun-joon, Lee Moon-sik, and Kim Min-kyung, the film depicts story of Lee Nan, Joseon's best swordsman, in front of an irreversible fate in a world of chaos.

It was released theatrically in South Korea on February 22, 2023.

== Cast ==
- Shin Hyun-joon as Lee Nan
- Lee Moon-sik as Lee Bang
- Kim Min-kyung as Seon-hong
- Hong Eun-ki as Dal-gi
- Lee Jung-min as Yawol
- Choi Sung-won
- Kim Byung-chun
- Park Jae-hoon
- Kim Je-yeol

== Production ==
On October 26, 2021, the casting of the film confirmed by DH Media. Shin Hyun-joon was cast in leading role of Lee Nan, the best salsu in Joseon, along with Lee Moon-shik, Kim Min-kyung, Hong Eun-ki, Choi Seong-won, Kim Byeong-chun, Park Jae-hoon, and Kim Je-yeol in supporting roles. Filming began on the same day. Later in November 2021, Lee Jung-min joined the cast in the role of Yawol, a hypnotic killer.

== Reception ==
The film was released on February 22, 2023, on 188 screens. As of February 25, 2023, with gross of US$25,282 and 3,593 admissions, it is at the 31st place among the South Korean films released in 2023.
