= Kwon Sang-woo =

South Korean actor (born 1976)

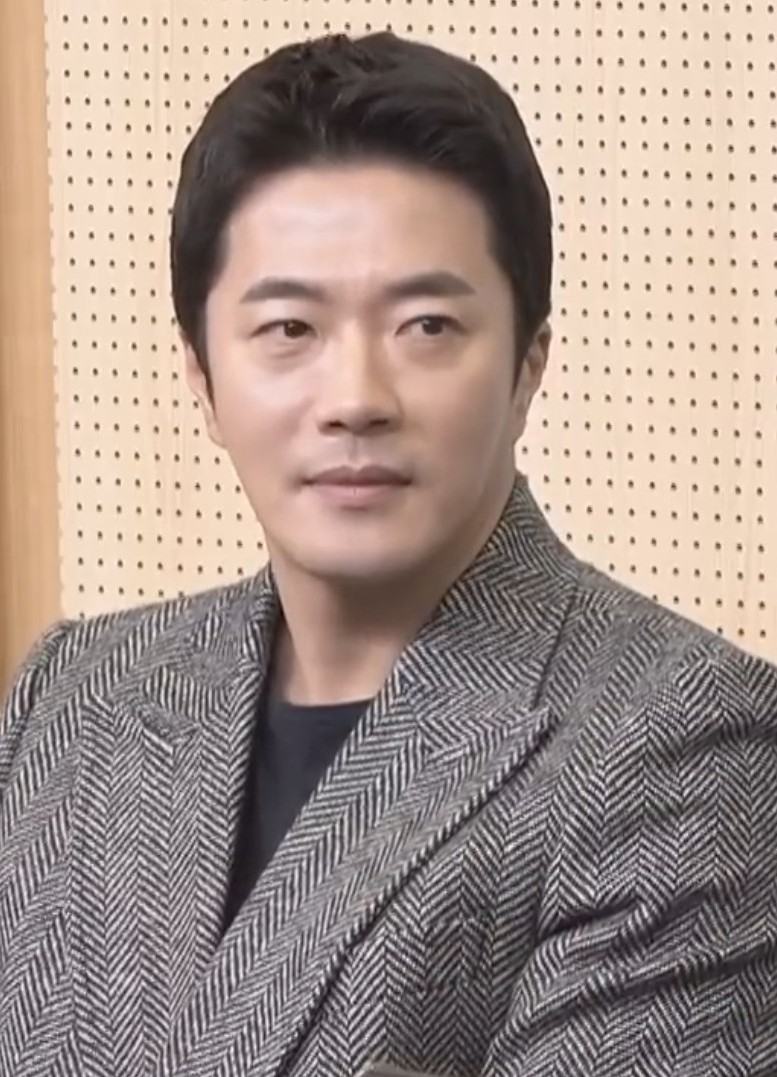
- Kwon in January 2023
- Born: August 5, 1976 (age 50); Daejeon, South Korea
- Education: Hannam University - B.A.
- Occupation: Actor
- Years active: 2001–present
- Agent: Su Company
- Spouse: Son Tae-young (m. 2008)
- Children: 2

Korean name
- Hangul: 권상우
- Hanja: 權相佑
- RR: Gwon Sangu
- MR: Kwŏn Sangu

Kwon Sang-woo (Korean: 권상우; born August 5, 1976) is a South Korean actor, famous for the melodrama series Stairway to Heaven. His other notable credits include the films Once Upon a Time in High School (2004), 71: Into the Fire (2010), The Accidental Detective (2015) and its 2018 sequel, The Divine Move 2: The Wrathful (2019), and Hitman: Agent Jun (2020), as well as the television series Big Thing (2010), Medical Top Team (2013), and Queen of Mystery (2017).

He has garnered numerous accolades, including multiple SBS Drama Awards and nominations for the Baeksang Arts Awards. Kwon Sang-woo starred in the Chinese drama Poong Hwa Sul Wul.

== Career ==
=== 2001–2005: Early career and breakthrough ===
Kwon Sang-woo, the most visible example of the so-called mom-zzang (slang for "great body") movement, started his career as a fashion model in the late 1990s. His first acting experience was in the TV drama Delicious Proposal, and for the first few years of his entertainment career, he received only minor roles on television, before making his big-screen debut in the martial arts film Volcano High (2001). The following year, he played his first lead role in the comedy Make It Big (2002) together with real-life best friend Song Seung-heon.

Kwon's breakthrough came in 2003 with the phenomenally successful romantic comedy My Tutor Friend, as a troublesome high school boy who is tutored by a college student of the same age (played by actress Kim Ha-neul). This was followed by appearances in My Good Partner, the world's first movie made for mobile phones, and the music video collection Project X.

His next film released in early 2004 was also a hit. Once Upon a Time in High School portrayed the authoritarian society of the 1970s through a notoriously violent high school. Simultaneously, Kwon's TV tearjerker Stairway to Heaven was winning high ratings over 40%. The drama eventually screened throughout Asia and helped to turn him into a regional star.

However, Kwon's follow-up film Love, So Divine, about a priest in training who falls in love, earned poor reviews and did not get much attention from audiences.

=== 2006–2009: Career fluctuations ===
For 2006, Kwon starred in the big-budget action noir Running Wild, about a detective, a prosecutor, and a criminal who are all equally vicious. Running Wild received satisfactory reviews, but disappointing returns, and Kwon's next film Almost Love, a romantic comedy reteaming him with Kim Ha-neul, likewise failed to replicate the success of their previous film.

Thus began Kwon's career slump, as the films Fate and More Than Blue flopped in the box office, and his small-screen projects Sad Love Story, Cruel Love, and Cinderella Man received low ratings.

=== 2010–2015: Comeback and overseas expansion ===
Things took a turn for the better in 2010 with the box-office success of Korean War film 71: Into the Fire which Kwon reportedly did not hesitate to take on, though he again portrayed a high school student. His drama Big Thing about Korea's first female president (played by Go Hyun-jung) was also very popular during its run, staying atop TV charts for 11 weeks straight and ending with viewership ratings around 26%.

In the 2011 melodrama Pained, Kwon played a man with analgesia, the inability to sense physical pain, who then falls in love with a woman suffering from hemophilia. Based on an original story by webcomic artist Kang Full, Pained was directed by Kwak Kyung-taek in a departure from his previous macho movies. Kwak said, "The production company told me Kwon Sang-woo was contemplating the part, and I said I would do it only if Kwon does. There was nobody else."

Looking to expand his acting career to a wider audience in Asia, in 2012 Kwon starred in movies with Chinese superstars Cecilia Cheung (romantic comedy Shadows of Love, previously known as Repeat, I Love You) and Jackie Chan (action film CZ12). He also made his singing debut in a DVD released in Japan in 2010. Cast as the male lead in a Chinese TV series titled Feng Hua Xue Yue (Wind Flower Snow Moon), Kwon's role was an Asian-American Broadway producer who comes back to China to stage a musical production in Yunnan Province and falls in love with the leading lady of his stage musical.

He next starred opposite Soo Ae in King of Ambition, which was adapted from the third installment of manhwa artist Park In-kwon's 21-part saga Daemul (the 2010 SBS TV series of the same name that also starred Kwon was adapted from the comic's second book).

Kwon was cast in his first medical drama in 2013, Medical Top Team from the director of Moon Embracing the Sun and the writer of Brain. He played a straightforward yet warm-hearted genius surgeon. In 2014, he reunited with Stairway to Heaven costar Choi Ji-woo in Temptation, about a married, debt-ridden businessman who agrees to a deal with a female CEO in exchange for her "ownership" of his body.

He next played the owner of an internet startup company in Honey Enemy, a 2015 Chinese romance film opposite Zhang Yuqi that filmed in Jeju Island and Shanghai. Kwon then starred in comedy film The Accidental Detective which revolves around a misfit comic book rental shop owner who becomes involved in a murder case.

=== 2015–present: Continued success ===
In 2016, Kwon starred alongside Choi Kang-hee in the crime comedy drama, Queen of Mystery. Kwon reprised his role in the second season of the show, which aired in 2018.

In 2018, Kwon starred in crime comedy The Accidental Detective 2: In Action. He was also cast in the romantic comedy film Shall We Do It Again.

Kwon has said in an interview, "I hope I'm remembered as an actor whose work the audience looks forward to rather than an actor who acts well."

In 2025, Kwon Sang-woo stars as the main character in the movie Hitman 2.

== Business interests ==
In 2009 Kwon established the cosmetics firm Natural Tears, of which he is the owner and CEO, as well as the inaugural advertising model for the brand TEARS. It was named after his nickname "Mr. Tears", given to him by fans in recognition of his tear-jerking acting in Stairway to Heaven.

He also opened the cafe Tea'Us in Myeong-dong, and is the biggest shareholder of the resort Ocean Blue Hotel Bali. The property Kwon owns in Bundang District was appraised at an estimated worth of ₩18 billion.

== Personal life ==
Unlike many Korean male stars who had to fulfill their mandatory military service at the height of their careers, Kwon completed his military service long before he became an actor.

Kwon's mother is a Roman Catholic, and he himself converted after filming Love, So Divine in which he played as a seminarian. His confirmation name is Francisco.

Kwon married actress and former Miss Korea Son Tae-young at the Shilla Hotel on September 28, 2008. On February 6, 2009, his wife gave birth to a baby boy, christened as Luke (nicknamed Rookie). Their second child, a daughter, was born on January 10, 2015.

=== Tax audit ===
Kwon was the subject of a non-regular National Tax Service audit around early 2020. When the matter became public in February 2023, reports put the additional amount paid at about ₩1 billion. Some coverage alleged that cars bought in the name of his company, Soo Company, had been used to reduce tax. The agency denied evasion. It said the authorities had asked about the timing of profit-and-loss recognition, that part of that timing differed from the original filing, and that Kwon had filed an amended return and paid the difference voluntarily. It said there had been no omission or evasion, only a correction because payment and refund arose at the same time. Soo Company later said reports of five corporate supercars used for evasion were untrue, that four business vehicles had been accepted as such in the audit, and that only one imported sedan was later sold.

== Controversy ==
In 2006 Kwon filed a complaint against Kim Tae-chon, the godfather of Beomseobangpa (one of Korea's three major criminal gangs), for threatening him when the actor failed to keep his promise to hold a fan meeting in Japan. Kwon and the defendant eventually came to a settlement, but prosecutors continued investigations into possible ties between kkangpae and the Japanese yakuza and Chinese crime syndicates that are looking to cash in on the Korean Wave entertainment business.

There was fan backlash to his 2008 marriage due to his wife's previous dating history. In an appearance on talk show Golden Fishery hosted by Kang Ho-dong in 2009, Kwon said, "After I got married, membership in my fan cafe dwindled from 240,000 to 135,000 - it was like a stock market crash." He also said that before he got married, he had an average of seven TV commercials per year, but by early 2009 that number had dwindled down to zero.

In the early hours of June 12, 2010, Kwon was involved in a car accident in Gangnam District. According to news reports, Kwon was driving on the wrong side of the road and hit a parked car. He then ran into the police car that had pursued him, continued driving and hit a tree before fleeing the scene on foot. Two days later, he turned himself in at Gangnam Police Station, claiming he had not been drunk. Kwon later made a public apology through a handwritten letter, and was fined ₩7 million by a Seoul district court.

== Filmography ==
=== Film ===
Year	Title	Role	Notes	Ref.
2001	Volcano High	Song Hak-rim		
2002	Make It Big	Lee Woo-seob		
2003	My Tutor Friend	Kim Ji-hoon		
2004	Once Upon a Time in High School	Kim Hyun-soo		
2004	Love, So Divine	Kim Kyu-shik		
2006	Running Wild	Jang Do-young		
2006	Almost Love	Lee Ji-hwan		
2008	Fate	Jo Cheol-joong		
2009	More Than Blue	Kang Chul-gyu ("K")		
2010	71: Into the Fire	Goo Kap-jo		
2011	Pained	Nam-soon		
2012	Shadows of Love	Kwon Jung-hoon	Chinese film	
2012	CZ12	Simon	Chinese film	
2015	The Honey Enemy	Zhou Yunfeng	Chinese film	
2015	The Accidental Detective	Kang Dae-man		
2018	The Accidental Detective 2: In Action	Kang Dae-man		
2019	Love, Again	Jo Hyun-woo		
2019	The Divine Move 2: The Wrathful	Gwi-soo		
2020	Hitman: Agent Jun	Jun		
2021	A Year-End Medley	Himself	Special appearance	
2022	The Pirates: The Last Royal Treasure	Bu Heung-Soo		
2023	Switch	Park Kang		
2025	Hitman 2	Jun		
2026	Heartman: Rock and Love	Choi Seung-min		

=== Television series ===
Year	Title	Role	Notes	Ref.
2001	Delicious Proposal	Lee Choon-shik		
2001	Legend	Yang Dol-man		
2002	We Are Dating Now	Yoon Ho-jae		
2003	Into the Sun	Kang Seok-min		
2003	Stairway to Heaven	Cha Song-joo		
2005	Sad Love Story	Seo Joon-young/Choi Joon-kyu		
2007	Cruel Love	Kang Yong-ki		
2009	Cinderella Man	Oh Dae-san / Lee Joon-hee		
2010	Big Thing	Ha Do-ya		
2011	Fuyu no Sakura	Himself	Cameo (Episode 8)	
2013	King of Ambition	Ha Ryu / Cha Jae-woong		
2013	Medical Top Team	Park Tae-shin		
2014	Temptation	Cha Seok-hoon		
2017	Queen of Mystery	Ha Wan-seung		
2018	Queen of Mystery 2	Ha Wan-seung		
2020–2021	Delayed Justice	Park Tae-yong		
2022	Why Her	Jung Hyeon-soo	Cameo (Episode 1)	
2022	Desperate Mr. X	Yoon Dae-wook		
2022	Curtain Call	Bae Dong-jae		
2023	Han River Police	Han Doo-jin		

=== Television shows ===
Year	Title	Role	Notes	Ref.
2021	House on Wheels: For Rent	Cast member	Spin-off of House on Wheels; with The Pirates 2 cast	

=== Music video appearances ===
Year	Title	Artist	Ref.
2000	"Smile Smile"	Papaya	
2000	"It's All Right"	Circle	
2001	"I Wish You Happiness" (Joy Project - 1 Year of Love)	Why	
2001	"First Love"	Ji Young-sun	
2002	"I Can't Tell"	Cha Eun-ju	
2002	"Ace of Sorrow"	Jo Sung-mo	
2003	"Project X"		
2005	"Sad Love Story"	Yoon Gun	
2005	"Anyclub"	Eric Mun and Lee Hyori	

== Ambassadorship ==
- Seoul Public Relations Ambassador for 2023 S/S Seoul Fashion Week (2022)

== Accolades ==
=== Awards and nominations ===
Name of the award ceremony, year presented, category, nominee of the award, and the result of the nomination
Award ceremony	Year	Category	Nominee / Work	Result	Ref.
Andre Kim Best Star Awards	2004	Male Star Award	Kwon Sang-woo	Won	
Andre Kim Best Star Awards	2007	Star Award, Men's category	Kwon Sang-woo	Won	
Asia Model Awards	2011	Asia Star Award	Kwon Sang-woo	Won	
Baeksang Arts Awards	2003	Best New Actor – Film	My Tutor Friend	Won	
Baeksang Arts Awards	2004	Most Popular Actor – Film	Once Upon a Time in High School	Won	
Baeksang Arts Awards	2004	Best Actor – Film	Once Upon a Time in High School	Nominated	
Baeksang Arts Awards	2008	Most Popular Actor – Film	Fate	Won	
Baeksang Arts Awards	2011	Best Actor – Television	Big Thing	Nominated	
Blue Dragon Film Awards	2002	Best New Actor	Make It Big	Nominated	
Blue Dragon Film Awards	2004	Popular Star Award	Once Upon a Time in High School	Won	
Grand Bell Awards	2003	Best New Actor	My Tutor Friend	Won	
Grand Bell Awards	2004	Popularity Award	Once Upon a Time in High School	Won	
KBS Drama Awards	2007	Best Couple Award	Kwon Sang-woo (with Lee Yo-won); Cruel Love	Nominated	
KBS Drama Awards	2007	Popularity Award, Actor	Cruel Love	Nominated	
KBS Drama Awards	2007	Top Excellence Award, Actor	Cruel Love	Nominated	
KBS Drama Awards	2017	Best Couple Award	Kwon Sang-woo (with Choi Kang-hee); Queen of Mystery	Nominated	
KBS Drama Awards	2017	Excellence Award, Actor in a Miniseries	Queen of Mystery	Nominated	
KBS Drama Awards	2017	Netizen Award, Actor	Queen of Mystery	Nominated	
KBS Drama Awards	2017	Top Excellence Award, Actor	Queen of Mystery	Nominated	
KBS Drama Awards	2018	Best Couple Award	Kwon Sang-woo (with Choi Kang-hee); Queen of Mystery 2	Nominated	
KBS Drama Awards	2018	Excellence Award, Actor in a Miniseries	Queen of Mystery 2	Nominated	
KBS Drama Awards	2018	Netizen Award, Actor	Queen of Mystery 2	Nominated	
Korea Best Dresser Swan Awards	2003	Best Dressed, TV Actor Category	Kwon Sang-woo	Won	
Korea Drama Awards	2011	Best Actor	Big Thing	Nominated	
Korea-Japan Culture Awards	2007	Non-Governmental Diplomacy Award	Kwon Sang-woo	Won	
MBC Drama Awards	2005	Best Couple Award	Kwon Sang-woo (with Kim Hee-sun); Sad Love Story	Nominated	
MBC Drama Awards	2005	Top Excellence Award, Actor	Sad Love Story	Nominated	
MBC Drama Awards	2013	Top Excellence Award, Actor in a Miniseries	Medical Top Team	Nominated	
Mnet 20's Choice Awards	2007	Hot Body	Kwon Sang-woo	Won	
SBS Drama Awards	2002	New Star Award	We Are Dating Now	Won	
SBS Drama Awards	2003	Netizen Popularity Award	Stairway to Heaven / Into the Sun	Won	
SBS Drama Awards	2003	Top 10 Stars	Stairway to Heaven / Into the Sun	Won	
SBS Drama Awards	2003	Excellence Award, Actor in a Drama Special	Stairway to Heaven	Nominated	
SBS Drama Awards	2003	Excellence Award, Actor in a Special Planning Drama	Into the Sun	Nominated	
SBS Drama Awards	2003	Top Excellence Award, Actor	Stairway to Heaven / Into the Sun	Nominated	
SBS Drama Awards	2010	Top Excellence Award, Actor in a Drama Special	Big Thing	Won	
SBS Drama Awards	2010	Top 10 Stars	Big Thing	Won	
SBS Drama Awards	2010	Best Couple Award	Kwon Sang-woo (with Go Hyun-jung); Big Thing	Nominated	
SBS Drama Awards	2010	Netizen Popularity Award, Actor	Big Thing	Nominated	
SBS Drama Awards	2013	Best Couple Award	Kwon Sang-woo (with Soo Ae); King of Ambition	Nominated	
SBS Drama Awards	2013	Top Excellence Award, Actor in a Drama Special	King of Ambition	Nominated	
SBS Drama Awards	2014	Best Couple Award	Kwon Sang-woo (with Choi Ji-woo); Temptation	Nominated	
SBS Drama Awards	2014	Netizen Popularity Award	Temptation	Nominated	
SBS Drama Awards	2014	Top Excellence Award, Actor in a Drama Special	Temptation	Nominated	
SBS Drama Awards	2020	Top Excellence Award, Actor in a Mid-Length/Long Drama	Delayed Justice	Nominated	
Seoul International Drama Awards	2013	Outstanding Korean Drama Actor	King of Ambition	Nominated	
Style Icon Awards	2009	Style Icon, TV Actor Category	Kwon Sang-woo	Won	
The Motion Pictures Association of Korea's The Year in Film Awards	2005	Hallyu Star Award	Kwon Sang-woo	Won	

=== Honors ===
Name of country or organization, year given, and name of honor or award
Country or organization	Year	Honor / Award	Ref.
Savings Day	2005	Presidential Citation	

=== Listicles ===
Name of publisher, year listed, name of listicle, and placement
Publisher	Year	Listicle	Placement	Ref.
Korean Film Council	2021	Korean Actors 200 (Note: Introduces 200 actors that best represent the present and future of Korean cinema to the people in the film industry all over the world.)	Included	
