= Flu (film) =

2013 South Korean disaster film

- Theatrical release poster
- Hangul: 감기
- RR: Gamgi
- MR: Kamgi
- Directed by: Kim Sung-su
- Screenplay by: Lee Yeong-jong; Kim Sung-su
- Story by: Jung Jae-ho
- Produced by: Kim Sung-jin; Seo Jong-hae; Jeong Hoon-tak; Im Young-ju
- Starring: Jang Hyuk; Soo Ae; Park Min-ha; Yoo Hae-jin; Lee Hee-joon
- Cinematography: Lee Mo-gae
- Edited by: Nam Na-yeong
- Music by: Kim Tae-seong
- Production companies: iLoveCinema iFilm Corp.
- Distributed by: CJ Entertainment
- Release date: August 14, 2013
- Running time: 121 minutes
- Country: South Korea
- Language: Korean
- Box office: US$19.8 million

Flu (Korean: 감기; RR: Gamgi; alternatively titled The Flu) is a 2013 South Korean disaster film written and directed by Kim Sung-su, about an outbreak of a deadly strain of H5N1 that kills its victims within 36 hours, throwing Bundang District of Seongnam, which has a population of nearly half a million people, into chaos. It stars Jang Hyuk, Soo Ae and Park Min-ha.

== Plot ==
Brothers Ju Byung-woo and Ju Byung-ki are smugglers in Seoul who find that illegal immigrants have died in a shipping container from an unknown illness. They take sole survivor Monssai and cellphone video of the bodies to show their boss in Bundang, but Byung-woo becomes sick and Monssai escapes. The brothers go to a clinic where the contagion is passed on to others who spread it throughout the city.

At the Contagion Center in Bundang, Dr. Kim In-hae is reprimanded for losing important data when her car fell down a mine shaft the previous day. Her bag is retrieved from the shaft by ERT members Oh Ji-goo and Bae Kyung-ub. Ji-goo answers her phone and delivers the bag to In-hae's daughter Mi-reu.

Byung-woo's condition worsens and he begins vomiting blood. His brother takes him to an emergency room, where he is isolated with an unknown flu. Called in to help, In-hae finds the cellphone video and theorizes that conditions in the shipping container allowed the virus to mutate. Byung-ki refuses to answer questions about the container. Byung-woo dies, and Byung-ki exposes several of the hospital staff while struggling to get to his brother.

The next day, many more people show pronounced symptoms. With help from the KCDC, the hospital staff locate and incinerate the shipping container. However, rats that had been feeding on the corpses escape into the city. The staff determine that the aggressive virus is a mutated H5N1 strain that can kill within 36 hours, and call to quarantine the city.

Monssai saves Mi-reu from being struck by a car. He then avoids her, aware that he is spreading the illness. Mi-reu calls Ji-goo to help search for the sick man, but they have no success. Rumours of the outbreak spread and people begin to panic. Ji-goo saves a woman who falls from an escalator, and loses sight of Mi-reu.

While disparaging the need for a quarantine, administrators and politicians are confronted with a catastrophic situation as people collapse in the street, including drivers who cause a series of violent crashes. Hospitals and communications systems become overwhelmed, and the quarantine is initiated. Politicians and research staff evacuate to Seoul and brief the Prime Minister, who makes a public announcement that worsens the panic in Bundang.

In-hae remains in Bundang and joins Ji-goo to search for Mi-reu. They find her in a supermarket which is being looted, with people showing symptoms while riot police try to contain them. The three manage to get out before steel shutters come down. In-hae gets them passage to Seoul, but Ji-goo refuses to abandon his duties and works with Kyung-ub to free those trapped in the store. In-hae and Mi-reu reach the last helicopter for Seoul, but Mi-reu shows symptoms and they are denied passage.

At night, the Bundang quarantine is reinforced by the Republic of Korea Army, reserve forces, United States Forces Korea, United States Air Force and the KCDC. The population is moved to a camp outside the Tancheon Sports Complex. Those displaying symptoms are further isolated in an infected quarantine zone (IQZ) beneath the stadium to receive medical treatment, though In-hae knows they have no cure. She slips Mi-reu through the examinations to hide her illness and keeps Mi-reu's mask on so that she won't infect others. On the second day, Monssai is found in the isolation zone. In-hae's proposal to directly inject his antibodies into a patient is overruled, but she secretly begins a transfusion to Mi-reu, whose condition has worsened. Later, Mi-reu's condition is exposed and she is sent to the IQZ.

There is unease in the camp due to a communications blackout, difficult living conditions, confrontations with gasmask-wearing guards, sporadic gunfire meant to keep birds from spreading the disease, and rumours that infected people are being killed. Pressure from Leo Snyder of the WHO and politicians force the president to break a promise to release the uninfected after 48 hours, and fights break out. When an infected soldier is fatally shot by an officer, a mob becomes enraged and storms the IQZ. They see Ji-goo rescuing Mi-reu from a pile of bodies that are being burned, and believe the infected are being burned alive.

In-hae and the medical staff flee the mob, but Byung-ki kills Monssai in a suicidal attack to avenge his brother's death. Mi-reu begins to recover, and Ji-goo takes her towards the highway to meet In-hae. However, Gook-hwan, an infected man who has been inciting unrest, leads the armed mob toward the highway. Learning that Mi-reu has antibodies, Gook-hwan shoots at Ji-goo, resulting in a deadly gun battle between the mob and the soldiers.

Ji-goo hides Mi-reu, who makes a full recovery. Gook-hwan tries to give himself a transfusion of her blood, but is discovered and killed in a struggle with Kyung-ub. Mi-reu flees and is pushed to the front of the mob, which is confronting soldiers on the highway. In-hae is shot while trying to prevent Mi-reu from crossing the containment line. Mi-reu shields her mother and pleads for them to stop, then the mob shields Mi-reu. The president orders the soldiers to stand down, and forces Snyder to cancel an air strike. Mi-reu is sent to Seoul to create a vaccine while medical teams are dispatched to Bundang.

== Cast ==
- Jang Hyuk as Oh Ji-goo
- Soo Ae as Kim In-hae
- Park Min-ha as Kim Mi-reu
- Yoo Hae-jin as Bae Kyung-ub
- Lee Hee-joon as Ju Byung-ki
- Cha In-pyo as the South Korean President
- Ma Dong-seok as Jeon Gook-hwan
- Kim Ki-hyeon as the South Korean Prime Minister
- Lee Sang-yeob as Ju Byung-woo
- Park Hyo-joo as Teacher Jung
- Park Jeong-min as Chul-gyo
- Boris Stout as Leo Snyder
- Kim Moon-soo as Dr. Yang
- Choi Byung-mo as Choi Dong-chi
- Jang Kyoung-yup as Sang-myung
- Andrew William Brand as Dr. Bill Beckman
- Lester Avan Andrada as Monssai
- Jo Hwi-joon as Chan-woo
- Do Yong-goo as Chan-woo's grandfather
- Noh Gi-hong as head of contagion center
- Lee Dong-jin as rescue swimmer 1
- Lee Young-soo as citizen at boundary line citizen
- Choi Jung-hyun as Prevention Special Forces
- Lee Sang-hyung as Defense Special Forces
- Kim Hyung-seok as ER resident 2
- Ham Jin-seong as ambulance worker
- Lee Seung-joon as police officer at accident scene
- Yang Myung-heon as captain at boundary line
- Wayne W. Clark as American general

== See also ==
- Outbreak (1995)
- Contagion (2011)
