= Ugly Miss Young-ae =

South Korean television series

- Promotional poster for season 15
- Hangul: 막돼먹은 영애씨
- RR: Makdwaemeogeun Yeongae ssi
- MR: Maktwaemŏgŭn Yŏngae ssi
- Genre: Comedy; Drama
- Starring: Kim Hyun-sook; Song Min-hyung; Kim Jung-ha; Go Se-won
- Country of origin: South Korea
- Original language: Korean
- No. of seasons: 17
- No. of episodes: 305

Production
- Running time: 45–60 minutes
- Production company: CJ E&M

Original release
- Network: tvN
- Release: April 20, 2007 – April 26, 2019

Ugly Miss Young-ae (Korean: 막돼먹은 영애씨; lit. 'Rude Miss Young-ae') is a long-running South Korean television series starring Kim Hyun-sook. The series premiered on tvN in South Korea on April 20, 2007. It ran for 17 seasons, ending in 2019.

== Synopsis ==
A realistic drama about the thrills and sadness of working women in their 30s, centered around a single woman named Lee Young-ae (Kim Hyun-sook).

== Broadcast schedule ==
Season #	Broadcasting period	Number of episodes per season
1	April 20, 2007 – August 3, 2007	16 episodes
2	September 7, 2007 – December 21, 2007	16 episodes
3	March 7, 2008 – June 20, 2008	16 episodes
4	September 5, 2008 – December 19, 2008	16 episodes
5	March 6, 2009 – July 17, 2009	20 episodes
6	October 16, 2009 – February 26, 2010	20 episodes
7	May 14, 2010 – September 24, 2010	20 episodes
8	December 12, 2010 – April 29, 2011	20 episodes
9	September 9, 2011 – January 20, 2012	20 episodes
10	April 13, 2012 – August 31, 2012	20 episodes
11	November 29, 2012 – March 28, 2013	18 episodes
12	July 18, 2013 – November 14, 2013	18 episodes
13	March 27, 2014 – July 10, 2014	16 episodes
14	August 10, 2015 – October 5, 2015	17 episodes
15	October 31, 2016 – January 3, 2017	20 episodes
16	December 4, 2017 – January 23, 2018	16 episodes
17	February 8, 2019 – April 26, 2019	16 episodes
Total number of episodes		305 episodes

== Cast ==
=== Main ===
==== Lee Young-ae's Design ====
- Kim Hyun-sook as Lee Young-ae - President (season 1-17)
- Go Se-won as Kim Hyuk-kyoo - Employee, Lee Young-chae's husband (season 1 – 9, 11, 14 – 17: main; season 10, 12, 13: guest)
- Han Ki-woong as Han Ki-woong (season 12-16)

=== Support ===
==== Paradise General Printing Company ====
- Jo Duk-jae
- Lee Seung-joon as Lee Seung-joon, Young-ae husband (season 12-17)
- Choi Hyo-eun as Go-young
- Ra Mi-ran
- Kim Do-yeon as Kim Do-yeon
- Yoon Seo-hyun
- Jung Ji-soon
- Lee Soo-min
- Sazal Kim

==== Whale Seafood ====
- Jo Dong-hyuk
- Jung Soo-hwan

==== Young-ae's family ====
- Song Min-hyung as Lee Gwi-hyun, Young-ae, Young-min & Young-chae's father (season 1-17)
- Kim Jung-ha as Kim Jung-ha, Young-ae, Young-min & Young-chae's mother (season 1-17)
- Jung Da-hye as Lee Young-chae, Young-ae's younger sister (season 1-5, 9-17: regular, season 8: guest)
- Park Shin-woo (season 1)
  - Hyun Jung (season 5-8)
  - Oh Seung-yoon as Lee Young-min, Young-ae's younger brother (season 13: regular; season 16: guest)

==== Others ====
- Jun Sung-ae as Jun Sung-ae
- Lee Woo-joo as Hyun Woo
- Kim Ah-ra as Mi-na
- Jung Yoon-gun as Hae Mil
- Lee Ki-chang

=== Special appearances ===
- Seo Gap-sook
- Jang Hyuk-jin
- Tak Jae-hoon
- Lee Yong-joo
- Kwon Hyuk-soo
- Yoo In-na
- Kim Jun-hyun as Martial arts dojo director (episode 12)
- Kim Ga-yeon
- Jang Do-yeon as Miran Red Shoes sales man (episode 14)
- Kim Hyung-il

== Crew ==
Season #	Director	Assistant director	Writer
1	Jung Hwan-seok, Park Joon-hwa	Shim Sang-mo, Uhm Ji-young, Lee-han Gwi-ri	Park Min-jung, Han Seok-hee
2	Park Joon-hwa, Choi Gyoo-shik	Baek Seung-ryong, Shin Hye-kyung, Jo Min-wook	Park Min-jung, Han Seok-hee
3	Jung Hwan-suk, Park Joon-hwa, Choi Gyoo-shik	Baek Seung-ryong, Jo Min-wook, Noh Ji-hye	Myung Soo-hyun, Han Seok-hee
4	Jung Hwan-suk, Park Joon-hwa, Choi Gyoo-shik	Baek Seung-ryong, Jo Min-wook, Noh Ji-hye	Lim Soo-mi, Han Seok-hee
5	Park Joon-hwa, Choi Gyoo-shik, Baek Seung-ryong	Jo Min-wook, Noh Ji-hye, Kim Mi-Kyung	Myung Soo-hyun, Lim Soo-mi
6	Park Joon-hwa, Choi Gyoo-shik, Baek Seung-ryong	Noh Ji-hye, Lee Bo-hye, Hong Doo-pyo	Myung Soo-hyun, Lim Soo-mi, Baek Seon-woo
7	Baek Joon-hee, Baek Seung-ryong, Choi Gyoo-shik	Noh Ji-hye, Hong Doo-pyo, Lee Se-na	Myung Soo-hyun, Baek Seon-woo, Lim Soo-mi
8	Baek Joon-hee, Baek Seung-ryong, Han Sang-jae	Noh Ji-hye, Lee Se-na, Hong Doo-pyo	Myung Soo-hyun, Baek Seon-woo, Lim Soo-mi
9	Jung Hwan-seok, Han Sang-jae, Choi Soon-yong	Noh Ji-hye, Lee Se-na, Hong Doo-pyo, Kim Sang-bae	Myung Soo-hyun, Han Seol-hee, Lim Soo-mi
10	Jung Hwan-seok, Han Sang-jae, Choi Soon-yong	Noh Ji-hye, Kim Sang-bae, Lee Se-na	Myung Soo-hyun, Han Seol-hee, Lim Soo-mi
11	Park Joon-hwa, Han sang-jae	Yoon Jae-soon, Lee Hyung-myung, Chae Bo-mi, Seo Min-jung, Lim Soo-jung	Myung Soo-hyun, Han Seol-hee, Lim Soo-mi
12	Han Sang-jae, Yoon Jae-soon	Lee Jae-hyun, Seo Min-jung, Kim Gye-young	Myung Soo-hyun, Han Seol-hee, Baek Seon-woo, Lim Soo-mi
13	Han Sang-jae, Yoon Jae-soon	Park Soo-won, Lee Ji-yeon, Son Jin-rak, Kim Sang-ah, Kim Ah-young	Myung Soo-hyun, Han Seol-hee, Baek Seon-woo, Lim Soo-mi
14	Han Sang-jae, Yoon Jae-soon	Jung Woo-jin, Lee Ji-yeon, Kim Ah-young, Jun Min-ha, Kang Na-rae	Myung Soo-hyun, Han Seol-hee, Baek Seon-woo, Lim Soo-mi
15	Han Sang-jae, Jung Hyung-gun, Yoon Jae-soon	Jo Eun-sol, Kim Ah-young, Kim Dong-Joo, Wui Seung-yeon	Han Seol-hee, Baek Ji-hyun, Hong Bo-hee, Jun Ji-hyun
16	Jung Hyung-gun		Han Seol-hee
17	Han Sang-jae		Han Seol-hee, Baek Ji-hyun, Hong Bo-hee

== Awards ==
Year	Award	Category	Recipient	Result
2016	tvN10 Awards	Best Content Award, Drama	Ugly Miss Young-ae	Won
2016	tvN10 Awards	Made in tvN, Actress in Drama	Kim Hyun-sook	Won
2016	tvN10 Awards	Perfect Attendance Award in Drama	Kim Hyun-sook	Won

== Ratings ==
For season 15, the average audience share was 2.6% (AGB Nielsen Ratings) or 3.2% (TNmS Ratings).
