= Temptation (2014 TV series) =

- Promotional poster
- Also known as: Seduction
- Genre: Romance; Melodrama; Erotica Drama
- Written by: Han Ji-hoon
- Directed by: Park Young-soo
- Starring: Kwon Sang-woo; Choi Ji-woo; Lee Jung-jin; Park Ha-sun
- Composer: Oh Seung-eun
- Country of origin: South Korea
- Original language: Korean
- No. of episodes: 20

Production
- Executive producer: Han Jung-hwan
- Producer: Cho Yoon-jung
- Production locations: South Korea, Hong Kong
- Production company: Victory Contents

Original release
- Network: SBS TV
- Release: July 14 – September 16, 2014

Temptation (Korean: 유혹; RR: Yuhok) is a 2014 South Korean television series starring Kwon Sang-woo, Choi Ji-woo, Lee Jung-jin and Park Ha-sun. It aired on SBS TV from July 14 to September 16, 2014, on Mondays and Tuesdays at 21:55 for 20 episodes. The drama reunites Choi Ji-woo and Kwon Sang-woo who both starred in the 2003 hit melodrama Stairway to Heaven.

== Plot ==
Cha Seok-hoon is a naive man who grew up a rural village in Gangwon Province. His intellect gets him into the country's top university despite his family's economic plight, and he takes on all sorts of part-time jobs, from quick services to construction work, in order to earn his tuition.

He then meets Na Hong-joo, a girl also from a poor family. Hong-joo is resigned to a miserable existence, until Seok-hoon brings happiness and hope into her life. They get married, and Hong-joo is a calm and understanding wife, always the first to sacrifice and make concessions. However, Seok-hoon finds himself plunged into massive debt due to a failed business venture with another partner.

Yoo Se-young is a hotel heiress, trained to take over her father's company from a young age. Called a "woman of iron," she is a workaholic and a headstrong leader, and has no interest in love or marriage. One of her family friends is rich playboy Kang Min-woo, who unsuccessfully tried to seduce her in the past. Min-woo has everything he could ever want, and approaches life with the philosophy that you should have a hundred different faces for a hundred different women. He got married only because it was a requirement for his inheritance.

While on a business trip to Hong Kong, Se-young meets Seok-hoon and Hong-joo, and for her amusement, she makes them a dangerous offer to test their marriage: In exchange for paying off Seok-hoon's debts so that he could avoid going to jail, she asks for three days with him.

Seok-hoon makes a crucial choice and takes the deal. But his strange relationship with Yoo Se-young jeopardizes his marriage. Upon their return to Korea, Seok-hoon and Hong-joo's marriage is unable to survive this crisis of trust, and they eventually divorce. Meanwhile, Se-young finds herself genuinely falling for Seok-hoon.

== Cast ==
=== Main characters ===
- Kwon Sang-woo as Cha Seok-hoon
- Choi Ji-woo as Yoo Se-young
- Lee Jung-jin as Kang Min-woo
- Park Ha-sun as Na Hong-joo

=== Supporting characters ===
- Chae So-young as Yoo Se-jin
- Kim Sung-kyum as Yoo Dal-ho
- Hong Yeo-jin as Jung Yoon-seok
- Joo Jin-mo as Choi Seok-gi
- Jo Mi-ryung as Myung-hwa
- Kim Hyung-bum as Jo Young-chul
- Choi Il-hwa as Na Shi-chan
- Lee Jung-shin as Na Hong-gyu
- Ahn Se-ha as Park Han-soo
- Jo Hwi-joon as Roy
- Yoon A-jung as Han Ji-sun
- Jung Hye-sun as Im Jung-soon
- Kim Ji-young as Kang Yoon-ah
- Heo Jung-eun as Kang Sung-ah
- Choi Hyun as Kim Doo-hyun
- Hwang Seok-ha as Chairman Doo
- Fei as Jenny
- Maria Cordero as Tina, Jenny's friend

== Ratings ==
Episode #	Original broadcast date	Average audience share			
Episode #	Original broadcast date	TNmS Ratings		AGB Nielsen	
Episode #	Original broadcast date	Nationwide	Seoul National Capital Area	Nationwide	Seoul National Capital Area
1	July 14, 2014	9.6%	11.9%	7.6%	8.6%
2	July 15, 2014	8.3%	10.3%	8.0%	9.1%
3	July 21, 2014	8.2%	9.9%	9.0%	10.3%
4	July 22, 2014	8.4%	10.8%	8.3%	9.3%
5	July 28, 2014	8.8%	10.5%	9.0%	9.3%
6	July 29, 2014	8.5%	10.4%	8.9%	9.6%
7	August 4, 2014	6.9%	8.7%	8.3%	9.3%
8	August 5, 2014	8.3%	10.3%	9.5%	10.7%
9	August 11, 2014	7.2%	9.5%	8.6%	9.2%
10	August 12, 2014	7.4%	9.6%	8.6%	9.3%
11	August 18, 2014	7.9%	9.6%	8.1%	9.0%
12	August 19, 2014	8.3%	10.7%	8.8%	9.3%
13	August 25, 2014	8.1%	9.8%	9.6%	10.6%
14	August 26, 2014	8.4%	10.9%	10.0%	10.7%
15	September 1, 2014	9.3%	11.1%	11.3%	12.2%
16	September 2, 2014	8.5%	11.0%	10.1%	11.4%
17	September 8, 2014	6.7%	8.2%	6.6%	7.2%
18	September 9, 2014	8.1%	9.8%	8.3%	8.9%
19	September 15, 2014	7.7%	9.6%	8.8%	9.7%
20	September 16, 2014	10.1%	12.6%	10.8%	11.7%
Average		8.2%	10.3%	8.9%	9.8%

== Awards and nominations ==
Year	Award	Category	Recipient	Result
2014	3rd APAN Star Awards	Best Supporting Actress	Yoon A-jung	Nominated
2014	22nd SBS Drama Awards	Top Excellence Award, Actor in a Drama Special	Kwon Sang-woo	Nominated
2014	22nd SBS Drama Awards	Top Excellence Award, Actress in a Drama Special	Choi Ji-woo	Nominated
2014	22nd SBS Drama Awards	Excellence Award, Actor in a Drama Special	Lee Jung-jin	Nominated
2014	22nd SBS Drama Awards	Netizen Popularity Award	Kwon Sang-woo	Nominated
2014	22nd SBS Drama Awards	Netizen Popularity Award	Choi Ji-woo	Nominated
2014	22nd SBS Drama Awards	Best Couple Award	Kwon Sang-woo and Choi Ji-woo	Nominated
