= The Divine Move 2: The Wrathful =

2019 South Korean action film

- Promotional poster
- Hangul: 신의 한 수: 귀수편
- RR: Sinui han su: gwisupyeon
- MR: Sinŭi han su: kwisup'yŏn
- Directed by: Lee Khan
- Written by: Yoo Sung-hyub
- Produced by: Lee Jin-sung
- Starring: Kwon Sang-woo; Kim Hee-won; Kim Sung-kyun; Heo Sung-tae; Woo Do-hwan
- Cinematography: Kim Dong-young
- Edited by: Shin Min-kyung
- Music by: Jang Hyuk-jin; Jang Yong-jin
- Production company: Mays Entertainment
- Distributed by: CJ Entertainment
- Release date: November 7, 2019
- Running time: 106 minutes
- Country: South Korea
- Language: Korean
- Box office: US$15.6 million

The Divine Move 2: The Wrathful (Korean: 신의 한 수: 귀수편; RR: Sinui han su: gwisupyeon) is a 2019 South Korean neo-noir action crime film directed by Lee Khan. A prequel spin-off to the 2014 film The Divine Move, it stars Kwon Sang-woo, Kim Hee-won, and Kim Sung-kyun. The film premiered in South Korean cinemas on November 7, 2019.

== Synopsis ==
Gwi-soo (Kwon Sang-woo) loses everything due to the game of baduk. With the help of his baduk teacher Heo Il-do (Kim Sung-kyun) and Teacher Ddong (Kim Hee-won), Gwi-soo jumps into the high stakes baduk game. He goes up against masters from all over the country.

== Cast ==
- Kwon Sang-woo as Gwi-soo
  - Park Sang-hoon as young Gwi-soo
- Kim Hee-won as Teacher Ddong
- Kim Sung-kyun as Heo Il-do
- Heo Sung-tae as "Busan Weed"
- Woo Do-hwan as "Loner"
- Won Hyun-joon as Shaman Jansung
- Stephanie Lee as Hwang Sun-hee
- Jung In-gyeom as Hwang Duk-young
- Shin Soo-yeon as Soo-yeon
- Kim Jung-pal as Son-hyung

=== Special appearance ===
- Go Se-won as Priest
- Yoo Sun as Madam Hong
- Park Kyung-hye as train station clerk
- Lee Byung-joon

== Production ==
Filming began on September 15, 2018 and was wrapped up on January 14, 2019.

== Reception ==
=== Critical response ===
The film received generally positive reviews from critics.

Yoon Min-sik from The Korea Herald wrote, "One-dimensional characters, comic-bookish exaggeration, numerous plot holes and no real twist -- yet the film still manages to be quite fun with adrenaline-pumping action and excitement. It's not a masterpiece, but it manages to create an intriguing, messed-up world."

=== Box office ===
On its opening day, the film finished first place at the box office by attracting 176,604 moviegoers, ahead of Terminator: Dark Fate and Kim Ji-young: Born 1982. During its opening weekend, the film topped box office with US$6.74 million gross from 879,000 admissions. The film surpassed 2 million admissions on November 22.

As of June 20, 2022, the film attracted 2,159,081 admissions with US$14.3 million gross.
