= The Accidental Detective =

The Accidental Detective: The Beginning
- Theatrical release poster
- Hangul: 탐정: 더 비기닝
- Hanja: 探偵: 더 비기닝
- RR: Tamjeong: deo bigining
- MR: T'amjŏng: tŏ pigining
- Directed by: Kim Joung-hoon
- Written by: Kim Joung-hoon
- Starring: Kwon Sang-woo; Sung Dong-il
- Production company: Cree Pictures
- Distributed by: CJ Entertainment
- Release date: September 24, 2015 (South Korea)
- Running time: 104 minutes
- Country: South Korea
- Language: Korean
- Box office: US$17.6 million

The Accidental Detective (Korean: 탐정: 더 비기닝) is a 2015 South Korean action comedy film directed by Kim Joung-hoon. It was released on September 24, 2015. The crux of the film is loosely inspired from Strangers on a Train. A sequel, The Accidental Detective 2: In Action, has been made and released on June 13, 2018.

== Plot ==
A true-crime enthusiast, Dae-Man (Kwon Sang-Woo) and a Sr. Detective Noh (Sung Dong-Il) now demoted under his Jr. investigate together to find the true murderer their friend is accused of.

== Cast ==
- Kwon Sang-woo as Kang Dae-man
- Sung Dong-il as Noh Tae-soo
- Seo Young-hee as Mi-Ok (Dae-Man's wife)
- Lee Il-hwa as Noh's wife
- Park Hae-Joon as Joon-Soo
- Lee Seung-Joon as Kim Yong-Gyu
- Jo Bok-Rae as Lee Yoo-No
- Kwon-hyeok as Han Tae-woong
- Yoon Kyung-ho as Detective Ma
