= Fate (2008 film) =

- Theatrical poster
- Hangul: 숙명
- Hanja: 宿命
- RR: Sungmyeong
- MR: Sungmyŏng
- Directed by: Kim Hae-gon
- Written by: Kim Hae-gon
- Produced by: Kang Min
- Starring: Song Seung-heon; Kwon Sang-woo; Kim In-kwon; Park Han-byul; Ji Sung
- Cinematography: Choi Ji-yeol
- Edited by: Choi Jae-geun; Eom Jin-hwa
- Music by: Choe Tae-wan; Im Hyeong-sun
- Distributed by: CJ Entertainment
- Release date: 20 March 2008
- Running time: 123 minutes
- Country: South Korea
- Language: Korean
- Box office: US$7,088,077

Fate (Korean: 숙명; RR: Sungmyeong) is a 2008 South Korean neo-noir action thriller film directed by Kim Hae-gon, starring Song Seung-heon, Kwon Sang-woo, Kim In-kwon, Park Han-byul and Ji Sung.

== Plot ==
Gang members Woo-min, Cheol-jung, Do-wan and Yeong-hwan are close friends, who, with the help of older gang member Gang-seop, decide to rob a casino so they can start their lives over. But Cheol-jung betrays the others, and Woo-min ends up in prison. After serving his time, Woo-min tries to stay out of trouble, but finds himself drawn back into the underworld.

== Cast ==
- Song Seung-heon as Kim Woo-min
- Kwon Sang-woo as Jo Cheol-jung
- Kim In-kwon as Jeong Do-wan
- Park Han-byul as Jeong Eun-yeong
- Ji Sung as Park Yeong-hwan
- Hong Soo-hyun as Jo Hyo-sook
- Lee Seung-joon as Hyo-sook's husband
- Wi Seung-cheol
- Min Eung-sik as Jeong Doo-man
- Ahn Nae-sang as Cha Gang-seop
- Jung Woo as Choi Jeong-hak

== Reception ==
Before filming was complete, the Japanese distribution rights to Fate were presold to Formula Entertainment for US$2 million, a relatively high sum due to Kwon Sang-woo's Korean Wave fanbase.

The film was not a big success, selling only 858,215 tickets nationwide.
