= Park Min-ha (actress) =

South Korean actress (born 2007)

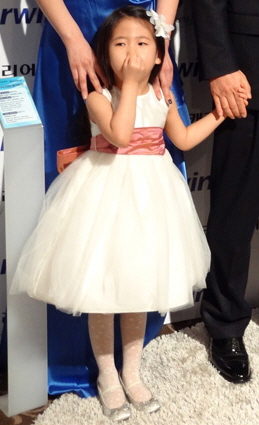
- Park in 2012
- Born: July 2, 2007 (age 19); Gunpo, South Korea
- Occupations: Actress; shooter
- Years active: 2011–2016; 2021–present
- Parent(s): Park Chan-min (father); Kim Jin (mother)

Korean name
- Hangul: 박민하
- RR: Bak Minha
- MR: Pak Minha

Park Min-ha (Korean: 박민하; born July 2, 2007) is a South Korean actress. Park began her career as a child actress in 2011 and has appeared in such productions as the South Korean disaster film Flu (2013), the Korean drama television series King of Ambition (2013), and the music video for K.Will's song "Love Blossom" (2013).

== Personal life ==
Her father is SBS anchorman Park Chan-min.

== Filmography ==
=== Film ===
| Year | Title | Role | Notes | Ref. |
|---|---|---|---|---|
| 2013 | Flu | Kim Mi-reu | | |
| 2017 | Confidential Assignment | Kang Yu-na | filmed in 2016 | |
| 2022 | Confidential Assignment 2: International | Kang Yu-na | filmed in 2021 | |

=== Television series ===
| Year | Title | Role | Ref. |
|---|---|---|---|
| 2011 | Indomitable Daughters-in-Law | Viviana | |
| 2012 | Feast of the Gods | young Song Yeon-woo | |
| 2012 | Arang and the Magistrate | young reincarnated Arang (cameo, episode 20) | |
| 2013 | King of Ambition | 6-year-old Joo Da-hae/Ha Eun-byul | |
| 2013 | Pots of Gold | Jin Ah-ram | |
| 2013 | Drama Festival: "Unrest" | Younger sister of the dead young handmaid | |
| 2015 | Mrs. Cop | Seo Ha-eun | |
| 2016 | W | child Oh Yeon-joo (cameo) | |
| 2022 | Cheer Up | young Do Hae-yi | |

=== Variety show ===
| Year | Title | Notes/Ref. |
|---|---|---|
| 2014 | Childhood Inquiry Life | Host |
| 2022 | King of Mask Singer | Contestant |

=== Music video appearance ===
| Year | Song title | Artist | Ref. |
|---|---|---|---|
| 2013 | "Love Blossom" | K.Will | |

== Awards and nominations ==
Name of the award ceremony, year presented, category, nominee of the award, and the result of the nomination
| Award ceremony | Year | Category | Nominee / Work | Result | Ref. |
|---|---|---|---|---|---|
| Coca-Cola Dream Athlete | 2022 | Coca-Cola Dream Sports Grand Prize | Park Min-ha | Won | |
| Coca-Cola Dream Athlete | 2022 | September Dream Player Award | Park Min-ha | Won | |
| Grand Bell Awards | 2013 | Best Supporting Actress | Flu | Nominated | |
