= Big Thing (TV series) =

2010 South Korean television series

- Promotional poster
- Also known as: Daemul; The President; Lady President
- Genre: Drama; Romance; Political drama
- Based on: Daemul by Park In-kwon
- Written by: Yoo Dong-yoon
- Directed by: Oh Jong-rok; Jo Hyun-tak
- Starring: Go Hyun-jung; Kwon Sang-woo; Cha In-pyo; Lee Soo-kyung
- Country of origin: South Korea
- Original language: Korean
- No. of episodes: 24

Production
- Executive producers: Goo Bon-geun; Lee Myung-woo
- Production location: Korea
- Running time: Wednesdays and Thursdays at 21:55 (KST)
- Production company: Victory Contents

Original release
- Network: Seoul Broadcasting System
- Release: 6 October – 23 December 2010

Big Thing (Korean: 대물; Hanja: 大物; RR: Daemul) is a 2010 South Korean television drama based on manhwa artist Park In-kwon's comic Daemul, and stars Go Hyun-jung as South Korea's first female president. Number one in its timeslot for 11 consecutive weeks, it gained successful ratings due to its cast and story arcs based on topical and controversial themes.

== Plot ==
Anchorwoman Seo Hye-rim (Go Hyun-jung), who gets fired while protesting about her husband's undeserved death, enters politics through the proposal of Kang Tae-san (Cha In-pyo), a member of the ruling party and a strong candidate for the next presidential elections. With the help of Ha Do-ya (Kwon Sang-woo) whom she's known since childhood, Seo becomes the first female president of South Korea. With political pressure and threats of potential impeachment from her rival Kang and his allies, Seo faces the crises and challenges of her term.

== Cast ==
- Go Hyun-jung as Seo Hye-rim
- Kwon Sang-woo as Ha Do-ya
- Cha In-pyo as Kang Tae-san
- Lee Soo-kyung as Jang Se-jin
- Park Geun-hyung as Jo Bae-ho (president of Democratic Party)
- Lee Soon-jae as Baek Sung-min (former President)
- Choi Il-hwa as Kim Myung-hwan (Tae-san's father-in-law)
- Lee Jae-yong as Gong Sung-jo (Do-ya's boss)
- Ahn Suk-hwan as Son Bon-Shik (media director)
- Im Hyun-sik as Ha Bong-do (Do-ya's father)
- Lee Joo-Shil as Yoon Myung-Ja (Hye-rim's mother)
- Kim Jae-bin as Park Dong-Hwa (Hye-rim's son)
- Seo Ji-young as Kim Ji-soo (Tae-san's wife, Myung-hwan's daughter)
- Song Ok-sook as Madam Min – Min Kyung-woo (friend of Se-jin's mother)
- Jang Young-nam as Wang Joong-ki (electoral specialist)
- Park Ji-il as Chief of Staff
- Kim Il-woo as Oh Jae-bong (Bae-ho's subordinate)
- Yum Dong-Hyun as Seo Soon-Jae
- Lee Moon-soo as Kim Tae-bong (corrupt senator)
- Kim Jin-ho as Kim Hyun-gab (Tae-bong's subordinate)
- Shin Seung-hwan as Kim Chul-Gyu (Kim Tae-bong's son)
- Yoon Joo-sang as Min Dong-ho (president of the adversary party)
- Goo Ji-sung as Park Myung-young (Do-ya's secretary)
- Ko Jun as Hwang Jae-man (killer)
- Kim Tae-woo as Park Min-goo (Hye-rim's late husband) (cameo, ep 1)
- Im Dong-Yub as vice manager (cameo)
- Rainbow as girlband (cameo, ep 5)
- Oh Seung-ah as Mina

== Ratings ==
- In the table below, the blue numbers represent the lowest ratings and the red numbers represent the highest ratings.

Date	Episode	Nationwide	Seoul
2010-10-06	01	17.4% (1st)	17.8% (1st)
2010-10-07	02	21.2% (1st)	21.4% (1st)
2010-10-13	03	23.0% (1st)	22.2% (1st)
2010-10-14	04	23.4% (1st)	22.7% (1st)
2010-10-20	05	24.7% (1st)	23.3% (1st)
2010-10-21	06	26.0% (1st)	25.9% (1st)
2010-10-27	07	25.0% (1st)	23.9% (1st)
2010-10-28	08	26.0% (1st)	25.4% (1st)
2010-11-03	09	24.4% (1st)	23.3% (1st)
2010-11-04	10	24.3% (1st)	24.1% (1st)
2010-11-10	11	23.9% (1st)	23.1% (1st)
2010-11-11	12	24.8% (1st)	24.2% (1st)
2010-11-17	13	24.2% (1st)	22.9% (1st)
2010-11-18	14	25.1% (1st)	24.3% (1st)
2010-11-24	15	23.8% (1st)	22.9% (1st)
2010-11-25	16	27.5% (1st)	27.0% (1st)
2010-12-01	17	23.7% (1st)	22.4% (1st)
2010-12-02	18	25.0% (1st)	24.4% (1st)
2010-12-08	19	24.2% (1st)	23.3% (1st)
2010-12-09	20	25.8% (1st)	25.3% (1st)
2010-12-15	21	25.2% (1st)	24.6% (1st)
2010-12-16	22	27.0% (1st)	26.2% (1st)
2010-12-22	23	24.0% (2nd)	23.3% (2nd)
2010-12-23	24	25.8% (1st)	25.1% (1st)
Average		24.4%	23.7%

Source: TNS Media Korea

== Awards and nominations ==
Year	Award	Category	Recipient	Result
2010	SBS Drama Awards	Grand Prize (Daesang)	Go Hyun-jung	Won
2010	SBS Drama Awards	Top Excellence Award, Actor in a Drama Special	Kwon Sang-woo	Won
2010	SBS Drama Awards	Top Excellence Award, Actress in a Drama Special	Go Hyun-jung	Nominated
2010	SBS Drama Awards	Excellence Award, Actor in a Drama Special	Cha In-pyo	Nominated
2010	SBS Drama Awards	Best Supporting Actor in a Drama Special	Lee Jae-yong	Won
2010	SBS Drama Awards	Best Supporting Actress in a Drama Special	Lee Soo-kyung	Won
2010	SBS Drama Awards	Producer's Award	Cha In-pyo	Won
2010	SBS Drama Awards	Top 10 Stars	Go Hyun-jung	Won
2010	SBS Drama Awards	Top 10 Stars	Kwon Sang-woo	Won
2010	SBS Drama Awards	Achievement Award	Park Geun-hyung	Won
2011	47th Baeksang Arts Awards	Best Actor (TV)	Kwon Sang-woo	Nominated
2011	4th Korea Drama Awards	Best Actor	Kwon Sang-woo	Nominated
