= King of Ambition =

South Korean television series

- Promotional poster
- Also known as: Yawang; King of the Beast; Queen of the Night
- Hangul: 야왕
- Hanja: 野王
- RR: Yawang
- MR: Yawang
- Genre: Melodrama; Romance; Action
- Based on: Daemul - Tale of Yawang by Park In-kwon
- Developed by: Lee Hyun-jik
- Written by: Lee Hee-myung
- Directed by: Jo Young-kwang; Park Shin-woo
- Starring: Kwon Sang-woo; Soo Ae; Jung Yun-ho; Kim Sung-ryung; Go Joon-hee
- Music by: Lee Jae-gyu; Park Seung-jin; Choi Min -chang
- Country of origin: South Korea
- Original language: Korean
- No. of episodes: 24

Production
- Executive producers: Choi Ji-yoon; Park San-gi
- Producers: Park Yong-soon; Lee Hee-soo; Yoon Young-ha; Ha Sang-hoon; Song Jeong-woo
- Production location: Korea
- Running time: 60 minutes, Mondays and Tuesdays at 20:55 (KST)
- Production company: Verdi Media

Original release
- Network: SBS TV
- Release: 14 January – 2 April 2013

King of Ambition (Korean: 야왕; RR: Yawang) is a 2013 South Korean television series, starring Kwon Sang-woo, Soo Ae, Jung Yun-ho, Kim Sung-ryung, and Go Joon-hee. It aired on SBS TV from 14 January to 2 April 2013, on Mondays and Tuesdays at 21:55 for 24 episodes. Based on Park In-kwon's manhwa of the same title, the same source material as Daemul, the drama tells the tale of an ambitious woman born into poverty who will let nothing stand in her way as she tries to become the First Lady, and a hopeless romantic who will sacrifice anything for her. But when she betrays him, he takes his revenge.

== Plot ==
The name Ha Ryu means "a child flown from heaven." He was given this name by the nun who first found him in front of an orphanage; it came to her immediately the moment she saw his pure, innocent face. Ha Ryu's life began in earnest when he first laid eyes on Da-hae at the orphanage. Ha Ryu was a simple boy who disliked chores; however, for Da-hae, there was nothing he would not do or any place he would not go. Whenever Da-hae cried, Ha Ryu became too restless to do anything. But when Da-hae was adopted, they had to part.

Ten years later, Ha Ryu runs into Da-hae again. He feels electrified and like he is losing his mind. Then and there, he swears that nothing will ever come between them again. He also promises himself that he will do anything and everything to make her happy until the day he dies. Da-hae is a bright young woman and Ha Ryu works day and night with all his strength to earn money to pay her university tuition abroad. No matter how tired he is, all he requires to be happy is Da-hae's smile.

But over time Da-hae changes. Ha Ryu thinks it cannot be permanent when he admires her beauty and sophistication, like a bright, shining star. Even when she frames him for a murder, he tries to understand her. However, when she loses their daughter, Eun-byul, he finally snaps and he cannot forgive her. Ha Ryu changes, too. His wrath erupts like a volcano because of the betrayal of his one true love and turns Ha Ryu into a beast. He, who was once a mere minion in a gang, makes his way to the top and becomes CEO of Baekhak Group, one of South Korea's leading corporations. "I will bring you down with my own two hands and put you back to where you first began. I will step on you and hurt you more than you can imagine," he promises her and his bitter revenge against Da-hae, the woman he, for so long, loved more than life itself, begins... in the end Da-hae becomes the first lady of South Korea, then she is exposed for her crimes after she shoots and injures Ha Ryu.

Ha Ryu then chases after her when Da-hae's step brother escapes with her. He confronts Da-hae for killing his father and when she admits to it he tries to run her over. Ha-Ryu jumps in the away and then he and Da-hae are both hit by the car. Da-hae, still conscious, cries and apologizes to a severely injured Ha Ryu. Then they both pass out and end up in hospital beds. They both imagine having conversations with each other when they were young and finally understand why they grew into the people they became. Ha Ryu wakes up from his coma only to find out Da-hae has died. Ha Ryu continues to live his life and ends the series back at the old house he, Eun-Byul, and Da-hae lived. He looks at the portrait Eun-Byul drew and thinks about all he has lost trying to pursue revenge.

== Cast ==
- Kwon Sang-woo as Ha Ryu / Cha Jae-woong
  - Chae Sang-woo as young Ha Ryu
- Soo Ae as Joo Da-hae
  - Kim So-yeon as young Da-hae
  - Park Min-ha as young Da-hae
- Jung Yun-ho as Baek Do-hoon
- Kim Sung-ryung as Baek Do-kyung
- Go Joon-hee as Seok Soo-jung
- Kwon Hyun-sang as Yang Taek-bae
- Lee Deok-hwa as Baek Chang-hak
- Cha Hwa-yeon as Baek Ji-mi
- Lee Jae-yoon as Joo Yang-heon
- Sung Ji-ru as Uhm Sam-do
- Lee Il-hwa as Hong Ahn-shim
- Go In-beom as Cha Shim-bong
- Cho Yoon-woo as Ha-ryu's partner
- Jung Ho-bin as Seok Tae-il
- Yoon Yong-hyun as Director Park
- Park Min-ha as Ha Eun-byul (6 years old)
  - Kim Ha-yoo as Ha Eun-byul (5 years old)
- Choi Hyun-seo as Eun-joo
- Jung Soo-in as Pyo Eun-jung
- Kim Sung-hoon as prisoner
- Son Tae-young as room salon customer (cameo, ep 2)

== Ratings ==
Episode #	Original broadcast date	Average audience share			
Episode #	Original broadcast date	TNmS Ratings		AGB Nielsen	
Episode #	Original broadcast date	Nationwide	Seoul National Capital Area	Nationwide	Seoul National Capital Area
1	14 January 2013	8.7%	9.8%	8.0%	9.3%
2	15 January 2013	7.8%	8.5%	8.1%	8.8%
3	21 January 2013	8.2%	9.2%	10.2%	11.1%
4	22 January 2013	9.8%	10.6%	9.9%	10.6%
5	28 January 2013	10.4%	11.7%	10.1%	11.2%
6	29 January 2013	12.0%	13.5%	12.3%	13.6%
7	4 February 2013	13.4%	14.7%	12.7%	14.0%
8	5 February 2013	16.4%	18.4%	15.3%	16.4%
9	11 February 2013	16.4%	18.7%	15.2%	16.1%
10	12 February 2013	20.1%	23.3%	17.5%	18.4%
11	18 February 2013	19.4%	21.8%	18.6%	19.9%
12	19 February 2013	19.6%	21.1%	19.4%	20.8%
13	25 February 2013	17.9%	20.2%	17.5%	18.9%
14	26 February 2013	18.8%	20.4%	17.7%	18.1%
15	4 March 2013	17.4%	19.2%	16.3%	17.2%
16	5 March 2013	18.3%	20.0%	18.6%	19.9%
17	11 March 2013	18.8%	21.3%	18.5%	20.3%
18	12 March 2013	18.8%	21.0%	18.3%	19.4%
19	18 March 2013	18.2%	21.4%	17.8%	19.1%
20	19 March 2013	18.3%	21.9%	18.6%	20.1%
21	25 March 2013	17.0%	20.0%	18.0%	19.9%
22	26 March 2013	22.8%	26.1%	22.9%	24.3%
23	1 April 2013	23.1%	25.9%	22.5%	24.5%
24	2 April 2013	26.7%	30.7%	25.8%	27.5%
Average		16.6%	18.7%	16.3%	17.5%

== Awards and nominations ==
Year	Award	Category	Recipient	Result
2013	Baeksang Arts Awards	Best TV Actress	Kim Sung-ryung	Nominated
2013	Mnet 20's Choice Awards	20's Drama Star - Female	Soo Ae	Nominated
2013	Seoul International Drama Awards	Outstanding Korean Drama	King of Ambition	Won
2013	Seoul International Drama Awards	Outstanding Korean Drama Actor	Kwon Sang-woo	Nominated
2013	Seoul International Drama Awards	Outstanding Korean Drama Actress	Soo Ae	Nominated
2013	Seoul International Drama Awards	Outstanding Korean Drama OST	"Ice Flower" by Ailee	Nominated
2013	Seoul International Drama Awards	Outstanding Korean Drama OST	"You Don't Know" by Kim Nam-gil	Nominated
2013	Seoul International Drama Awards	Most Popular Actor	Jung Yun-ho	Won
2013	Korea Drama Awards	Excellence Award, Actress	Soo Ae	Nominated
2013	APAN Star Awards	Top Excellence Award, Actress	Soo Ae	Nominated
2013	APAN Star Awards	Acting Award, Actress	Kim Sung-ryung	Won
2013	APAN Star Awards	Acting Award, Actress	Go Joon-hee	Nominated
2013	SBS Drama Awards	Top Excellence Award, Actor in a Drama Special	Kwon Sang-woo	Nominated
2013	SBS Drama Awards	Top Excellence Award, Actress in a Drama Special	Soo Ae	Nominated
2013	SBS Drama Awards	Special Acting Award, Actor in a Drama Special	Lee Deok-hwa	Nominated

== International broadcast ==
It aired in Japan on cable channel KNTV from 10 May – 18 October 2013, and was re-aired on cable channel WOWOW.

It aired in Vietnam on HTV2 from 18 April - 6 June 2014 at 08:00pm.

It aired in the Philippines on GMA Network from 15 April – 30 June 2015 at 10:05pm (PST), replacing Empress Ki. It was re-aired on GMA News TV from 15 August – 16 September 2016 at 11:00pm, replacing The Producers.

It aired in Thailand on 3SD beginning on 2 May 2016 at 01:15pm
