= Queen of Mystery =

2017 South Korean television series

- Promotional Poster
- Hangul: 추리의 여왕
- Hanja: 推理의女王
- Lit.: Mystery's Queen
- RR: Churiui yeowang
- MR: Ch'uriŭi yŏwang
- Genre: Mystery; Comedy
- Created by: KBS Drama Production
- Written by: Lee Seong-min
- Directed by: Kim Jin-woo; Yoo Young-eun
- Starring: Choi Kang-hee; Kwon Sang-woo
- Country of origin: South Korea
- Original language: Korean
- No. of episodes: 16

Production
- Executive producers: Bae Kyung-soo; Lee Sang-baek
- Producer: Lee Young-bum
- Cinematography: Kim Kyung-ho; Han Joo-yeol
- Editor: Kim Chung-yeol
- Camera setup: Single-camera
- Running time: 60 mins
- Production company: AStory

Original release
- Network: KBS2
- Release: April 5 – May 25, 2017

Queen of Mystery (Korean: 추리의 여왕) is a South Korean television series starring Choi Kang-hee, Kwon Sang-woo, Lee Won-keun and Shin Hyun-been. It aired on KBS2 from April 5 to May 25, 2017, on Wednesdays and Thursdays at 22:00 (KST) for 16 episodes.

== Synopsis ==
The drama centres around a prosecutor's wife, Yoo Seol-ok (Choi Kang-hee), who has always wanted to become a police officer. One day, she gets to know a passionate detective Ha Wan-seung (Kwon Sang-woo) and he gives her an opportunity to make her dream come true. They start working on mysterious cases together.

== Cast ==
=== Main ===
- Choi Kang-hee as Yoo Seol-ok (Sue Yoo)
- Kwon Sang-woo as Detective Ha Wan-seung (Warren Ha)
- Lee Won-keun as Officer Hong Joon-oh (Gelo Hong)
- Shin Hyun-been as Jung Ji-won (Shannon Jung)

=== Supporting ===
==== People around Seol Ok ====
- Kim Hyun-sook as Kyung-mi, Seol Ok's friend
- Shim Wan-joon as Detective Ko
- Yoon Hee-seok as Kim Ho-chul, Seol Ok's husband
- Jeon Soo-jin as Kim Ho-soon, Seol Ok's sister-in-law
- Park Joon-geum as Park Kyung-suk, Seol Ok's mother-in-law

==== People around Wan Seung ====
- Ahn Gil-kang as Bae Kwang-tae
- Kim Min-jae as Lee Dong-gi
- Jang Gwang as Ha Jae-ho
- Yang Ik-june as Jang Do-jang

=== Others ===
- Park Byung-eun as Inspector Woo Sung-ha
- Cha Min-ji as Ko Joo-yeon
- Jung Yeon-joo as Jin
- Lee Seon-hee as Seon-hui
- Han Ki-woong as Cha Min-woo / No Doo-gil (Ep. 7–8)
- Jung In-gi as Jang Woo-sup
- Lee Yoo-joon as Park Won Hee
- Hong Kyung as a Bully

== Production ==
The series is based on a script by Lee Seong-min which was one of the winners in the 2016 KBS TV Drama Miniseries Competition alongside My Fair Lady and Two Cops.

== Ratings ==
- The blue numbers represent the lowest ratings and the red numbers represent the highest ratings.
- NR denotes that the drama did not rank in the top 20 daily programs on that date.

Ep.	Date	Average audience share			
Ep.	Date	TNmS		AGB Nielsen	
Ep.	Date	Nationwide	Seoul	Nationwide	Seoul
1	April 5, 2017	10.8% (7th)	12.1% (4th)	11.2% (5th)	12.4% (4th)
2	April 6, 2017	9.8% (10th)	11.0% (6th)	9.5% (10th)	10.0% (6th)
3	April 12, 2017	10.9% (6th)	12.4% (4th)	10.1% (6th)	10.2% (4th)
4	April 13, 2017	12.5% (6th)	13.2% (4th)	11.6% (4th)	12.1% (5th)
5	April 19, 2017	8.6% (16th)	10.6% (7th)	7.7% (11th)	7.7% (11th)
6	April 20, 2017	10.4% (9th)	12.0% (5th)	10.9% (6th)	11.2% (4th)
7	April 26, 2017	10.4% (8th)	12.1% (4th)	10.7% (5th)	11.6% (4th)
8	April 27, 2017	9.6% (10th)	11.7% (5th)	10.5% (6th)	11.6% (5th)
9	May 3, 2017	9.4% (6th)	10.9% (4th)	9.2% (6th)	9.3% (4th)
10	May 4, 2017	9.3% (6th)	10.9% (4th)	9.0% (7th)	9.4% (5th)
11	May 10, 2017	9.0% (8th)	9.9% (6th)	8.7% (7th)	8.8% (6th)
12	May 11, 2017	8.6% (14th)	10.5% (7th)	9.2% (10th)	9.5% (7th)
13	May 17, 2017	8.9% (11th)	9.0% (10th)	8.7% (8th)	8.5% (9th)
14	May 18, 2017	7.3% (17th)	7.6% (15th)	8.2% (12th)	8.0% (11th)
15	May 24, 2017	7.2% (20th)	7.3% (20th)	8.4% (10th)	8.3% (11th)
16	May 25, 2017	7.9% (18th)	7.6% (14th)	8.3% (12th)	8.4% (12th)
Average		9.4%	10.5%	9.4%	9.8%

== Awards and nominations ==
Year	Award	Category	Recipient	Result
2017	31st KBS Drama Awards	Top Excellence Award, Actor	Kwon Sang-woo	Nominated
2017	31st KBS Drama Awards	Top Excellence Award, Actress	Choi Kang-hee	Nominated
2017	31st KBS Drama Awards	Excellence Award, Actor in a Miniseries	Kwon Sang-woo	Nominated
2017	31st KBS Drama Awards	Excellence Award, Actress in a Miniseries	Choi Kang-hee	Nominated
2017	31st KBS Drama Awards	Netizen Award	Kwon Sang-woo	Nominated
2017	31st KBS Drama Awards	Netizen Award	Choi Kang-hee	Nominated
2017	31st KBS Drama Awards	Best Couple Award	Kwon Sang-woo and Choi Kang-hee	Nominated
