= Pajama Friends =

South Korean Variety Show

- Hangul: 파자마 프렌즈
- RR: Pajama peurenjeu
- MR: P'ajama p'ŭrenjŭ
- Genre: Reality show Lifestyle show
- Starring: Song Ji-hyo; Joy; Jang Yoon-ju; Cheng Xiao
- Country of origin: South Korea
- Original language: Korean
- No. of seasons: 1
- No. of episodes: 13

Production
- Executive producers: Kim Joo-hyung; Young Seok-in
- Production location: South Korea
- Running time: 75 Minutes

Original release
- Network: Lifetime
- Release: September 15 – December 8, 2018

Pajama Friends (Korean: 파자마 프렌즈) is a South Korea variety show program on Lifetime starring Song Ji-hyo, Red Velvet's Joy, Jang Yoon-ju and Cheng Xiao. The show aired on Lifetime from September 15 to December 8, 2018. Subsequent episodes aired every Saturday at 22:30 (KST) on Lifetime.

== Synopsis ==
Pajama Friends is a reality program about four women (Song Ji-hyo, Joy, Jang Yoon-ju and Cheng Xiao) who work in different fields in the industry and came together to enjoy 2-day-and-1-night vacations in hotels of various styles within Korea. Due to the women's shared preferences, the locations commonly have a spa pool and/or a swimming pool.

== Guests ==
Name	Episode(s)	Note(s)	Ref.
Hong Jong-hyun	2	as cinderella boy	
Kim Min-Jae	4	as cinderella boy	
John Park	8	as cinderella boy	
Yoo Seung-woo	8	as cinderella boy	
Red Velvet's Wendy	5-7	Ep 5: as part of the behind-the-scenes episode; Ep 6-7: as Joy's guest for Halloween party	
Red Velvet's Seulgi	5,10	Ep 5: as part of the behind-the-scenes episode; Ep 10: as Joy's daytime replacement. Joy was receiving treatment for her injured shoulder.	
Red Velvet's Irene	5	as part of the behind-the-scenes episode	
Cosmic Girls' Eunseo	5	as part of the behind-the-scenes episode	
The Four New Models (Jung-hak, Park Yuri, Min Jungki, Kim Jinkun)	7	as Yoonju's guests for the Halloween Party. As they are not Cinderella Boys, they only stayed for the party.	
Kim Jong-kook	10-11	as cinderella boy	
Yoon Shi-yoon	12-13	as cinderella boy	

== Special cast ==
Name	Episode(s)	Note(s)	Ref.
Red Velvet's Wendy	6-7	Replacing Cheng Xiao due to her drama filming in China. Doubles as Joy's guest for Halloween party	
Kim Soo-mi	6-7	Replacing Cheng Xiao due to her drama filming in China. Dynamic Duo Gaeko's wife. Doubles as Yoonju's guest for Halloween party	
Goo Jae-yee	6-7	Replacing Cheng Xiao due to her drama filming in China. Doubles as Song Jihyo's guest for Halloween party	
Apink's Ha-young	8－9	Replacing Cheng Xiao due to her drama filming in China. High school schoolmate of Joy's and Yerin of GFriend Each hotel is featured in 2 episodes.	
Girls' Generation's Sunny	10-11	Replacing Cheng Xiao due to her drama filming in China.	
AOA's Seolhyun	12-13	Replacing Cheng Xiao due to her drama filming in China.	

== Hotels and attractions featured ==
- Four Seasons Hotel, Gwanghwamun, Jongno District, Seoul (ep 1 – 2), a world-renowned 5-star hotel chain.
- Gyeongwonjae Ambassador Incheon, Yeonsu District, Incheon (ep 3 – 4), the only five-star hotel in a form of a traditional Korean Palace in the 16th century. Well known for being surrounded by modern skyscrapers, and was used as the filming location for both The Lonely and Great God – Goblin and Tempted.
- Banyan Tree Club & Spa Seoul, Namsan, Seoul (ep 6 – 7), a world-renowned 5-star spa, resort and hotel chain with a villa concept.
- Park Roche Hotel, Jeongseon, Gangwon Province, (ep 8-9), the first 4-star hotel, and the first hotel featured in the countryside. Its main theme is holistic wellbeing, which includes many lessons, but unlike a gym, its sole purpose is to relax your mind and detox your body.
- Lotte World, Jamsil-dong, Seoul (ep 10), a recreation complex includes its own hotel, amusement park, aquarium, ice rink and zoo. They were only in for the thrill rides before heading off to the hotel.
- Vista WalkerHill Seoul, Gwangjin District, Seoul (ep 10-11) an American-style hotel chain on the edge of Seoul. Situated on the less populous side of Han River, Seoul resting on Achasan Mountain. The first hotel in Korea to have IOT voice-command services for adjusting lighting, curtains, etc.
- Anati Cove Spa & Resorts, Gijan, Busan (ep 12-13) Overseeing the sea, while it is known for its spa and swimming pool, it also boast its own mini shopping town, large library with mini library in each extremely large hotel apartment units.
- Hilton Hotel, Busan, a world-renowned 5-star hotel chain opened in February 2017. It was used as the filming location for The Bride of Habaek. They only stayed there for post-production meals with the production crew.

== Common timing checkpoints ==
- Early Check-in (3rd stop): 11am
- Assembly: 1 pm
- Check-in: 2 pm or 3pm
- Dinner: 7 pm
- Arrival of Cinderella boy: 10 pm
- Cinderella boy leaves: 12 am
- Clean-down time: 12:30am
- Daniel's Wake-up call: 7:30 am (disabled in 5th stop)
- Morning exercise: 9 am
- Check-out: 11am or 12 pm

== PJPJ ==
PJPJ is a non-promotional dance group spawned from the final episode, with Seolhyun as the leader and dance instructor and Yoon-ju as the MV director.
