= Goo Jae-yee =

South Korean actress and model (born 1986)

- 구재이
- Born: Goo Eun-ae (구은애); February 28, 1986 (age 40); South Korea
- Other name: Goo Jae-yi
- Education: Seoul Arts High School; Ewha Womans University
- Occupations: Actress; model
- Agent: Higher Rank Entertainment
- Spouse: Unknown (m. 2018)
- Children: 1 son
- Modeling information
- Height: 1.72 m (5 ft 8 in)
- Hair color: black
- Eye color: dark brown

Korean name
- Hangul: 구은애
- Hanja: 具恩愛
- RR: Gu Eunae
- MR: Ku Ŭnae

Stage name
- Hangul: 구재이
- Hanja: 具在伊
- RR: Gu Jaei
- MR: Ku Chaei

Goo Jae-yee (Korean: 구재이; born 28 February 1986), born Goo Eun-ae (구은애), is a South Korean actress and model. She is known for her roles in the television series The Gentlemen of Wolgyesu Tailor Shop (2016–2017) and Mistress (2018).

== Background ==
Goo attended Seoul Arts High School and graduated from Ewha Womans University with the Bachelor of Dance.

Goo first worked as a model before going to an acting career in 2012.

== Personal life ==
During her time as a model, Goo was once in relationship with Ha Jung-woo from August 2008, which later announced in April 2009. Goo and Ha had since broke up in January 2012.

On 15 June 2017, while on the way from Grand Hyatt Seoul, Goo was caught for driving under influence of alcohol near the Hannam Bridge in Seoul at 11:40 p.m, with her blood alcohol concentration of 0.051%, enough to result in the cancellation of her driver's license.

On 28 November 2018, Goo's agency My Company released an official announcement and statement of her upcoming marriage to a professor who was five years older than her and taught at a university in France, scheduled for 30 December 2018.

On 30 December 2018, Goo was married at a private ceremony in Seoul. They have one son who was born on December 29, 2020.

== Filmography ==
=== Films ===
Year	Title	Role	Note
2005	Seoul Raiders	Model	Non-acting cameo Credited as Goo Eun-ae

=== Short films ===
Year	Title	Role	Note
2012	Do You Remember Me? 3D		Short film in 3D Credited as Goo Eun-ae

=== Television dramas ===
Year	Title	Role	Note
2012	Love Rain	Model	Cameo; Credited as Goo Eun-ae
2012	KBS Drama Special: "Swamp Ecology Report"	Yoon Jeong	Credited as Goo Eun-ae
2013	The Greatest Thing in the World	So Yoo-ri	Credited as Goo Eun-ae
2013	Dating Agency: Cyrano	Dokgo Mi-jin	Credited as Goo Eun-ae
2014	Angel's Revenge	Park Chae-rin	Credited as Goo Eun-ae
2014	KBS Drama Special: "Ugly Love"	Song Yun-yi	
2015	I Order You	Ah Da-hwa	
2015	Oh My Ghost	Wang Joo	Cameo in Episode 1
2015	Last	Yoon Jung-min	
2016	The Vampire Detective	Yoon Seol-ah	Cameo in Episode 5
2016	The Gentlemen of Wolgyesu Tailor Shop	Min Hyo-joo	
2018	Mistress	Do Hwa-young	
2018	Lovely Horribly	fake ghost	Cameo

=== Music video appearances ===
Year	Song	Artist	Notes
2008	"Kiss"	Kim Gun-mo	

=== Variety shows ===
Year	Title	Role	Network	Notes
2017	Follow Me8	MC	Fashion N	
2018	Song Ji-hyo's Beautiful Life	herself	OnStyle	regular member
2018	Pajama Friends	MC	Lifetime	as replacement for Cheng Xiao, double for Song Ji-hyo on Episode 6 and 7
