= Stateless Things =

2011 South Korean film

- Directed by: Kim Kyung-mook
- Written by: Kim Kyung-mook
- Starring: Paul Lee
- Cinematography: Gang Guk-hyeon
- Edited by: Kim Kyung-mook
- Music by: Lee Min-hee
- Release date: 2011
- Country: South Korea
- Language: Korean

Stateless Things (Korean: 줄탁동시) is a 2011 South Korean drama film written and directed by Kim Kyung-mook.

The film premiered at the 68th edition of the Venice Film Festival, in the Horizons competition. It was later screened in other festivals, including the Vancouver Film Festival, the BFI London Film Festival and the Hong Kong International Film Festival.

== Cast ==
- Paul Lee as Joon
- Yeom Hyun-joon as Hyeon
- Kim Sae-byuk as Soon-hee
- Lim Hyung-guk as Seong-hoon
- Kim Jeong-seok as Byeong-seok
- So Hee-jung as Sook-in
