= Mistress (TV series) =

2018 South Korean television series

- Promotional poster
- Hangul: 미스트리스
- RR: Miseuteuriseu
- MR: Misŭt'ŭrisŭ
- Genre: Mystery; Thriller; Romance
- Based on: Mistresses by S. J. Clarkson and Lowri Glain
- Developed by: Studio Dragon
- Written by: Go Jung-woon; Kim Jin-wook
- Directed by: Han Ji-seung
- Starring: Han Ga-in; Shin Hyun-been; Choi Hee-seo; Goo Jae-yee
- Country of origin: South Korea
- Original language: Korean
- No. of episodes: 12

Production
- Executive producers: Cho Hyung-jin; Kim Sang-heon
- Production company: Chorokbaem Media

Original release
- Network: OCN
- Release: April 28 – June 3, 2018

Related
- Mistresses (U.S.); Mistresses (UK)

Mistress (Korean: 미스트리스) is a 2018 South Korean television series based on the 2008–2010 British series of the same name. It stars Han Ga-in, Shin Hyun-been, Choi Hee-seo and Goo Jae-yee. The series aired on OCN from April 28 to June 3, 2018 on Saturdays and Sundays at 22:20 (KST).

== Synopsis ==
It revolves around the story of four women in their 30s and their complex relationships - each on her own path to self-discovery as they brave the turbulent journey together.

The series starts with close friends Se-Yeon (Han Ga-In), Eun-Soo (Shin Hyun-Been), Jung-Won (Choi Hee-Seo), and Hwa-Young (Goo Jae-Yee) standing in front of a dead man's body.

2 months prior:

Se-Yeon runs a cafe. She has a daughter, who she loves very much. Her husband had died 2 years earlier, but his body was never found. She receives a phone call without a caller ID number. The caller plays her husband's favorite song, unnerving her. Meanwhile, Song-Hoon (Lee Hee-Joon), a divorced father whose daughter attends the same kindergarten as Se-Yeon's daughter, tries to initiate a romantic relationship with her. Se-Yeon's friends encourage her to pursue this relationship.

Eun-Soo works as a psychiatrist. One day, her patient Sun-Ho (Jung Ga-Ram) tells her that he is looking for his dead father's mistress, as he believes that the mistress killed his father. Sun-Ho vows to kill this mistress, hinting that he is aware of Eun-Soo's relationship with his late father. Eun-Soo does not tell her client that she is the one who had the secret affair with his father, nor that she was the one who found his dead body. Eun-Soo also has another secret.

Jung-Won is a high school teacher. She is married to a famous chef, Dong-Seok (Park Byung-Eun), who seems like the perfect husband. Dong-Seok wants to have a child badly and continuously tracks Jung-Won's ovulation period, but Jung-Won doesn't know the real reason he wants a child. Meanwhile, Min-Gyu (Ji Il-Joo) is a temporary teacher at the same high school that Jung-Won teaches. Min-Gyu ultimately blackmails her after seeing her leave a motel, knowing it will cause the vice principal at her school to fire her. However, Min-Gyu has an ulterior motive.

Hwa-Young works as an office administrator at a law firm. She enjoys her single life and she doesn't want to be tied down by one man. One day, a female client comes and requests that someone secretly follow her husband Tae-O (Kim Min-Soo). Hwa-Young takes this task, but realizes that the man is her ex-boyfriend.

== Cast ==
=== Main ===
- Han Ga-in as Jang Se-yeon

Owner of a coffee shop. A widow who lives alone with her daughter. She is sympathetic, nurturing, and often puts others' needs ahead of her own.

- Shin Hyun-been as Kim Eun-soo

A psychiatrist. After her paramour's death, she meets a patient named Sun-ho who happens to be the son of her ex-lover. She is able to hide her emotions very well, except for a nervous tick, which heightens her level of anxiety.

- Choi Hee-seo as Han Jung-won

A high school teacher and wife of a famous chef. She dreams of a perfect home, but is stressed due to pregnancy issues. She is hot-tempered, and mostly driven by her emotions.

- Goo Jae-yee as Do Hwa-young

A law firm secretary who lives to fulfill her ambitions. She has a carefree attitude, which can sometimes come off as insensitive. She wants to live her life man-free, but is continuously reminded of her past.

=== Supporting ===
- Lee Hee-joon as Han Sang-hoon

A complex man who stays close to Se-yeon's side and takes care of her, but hides a dark secret.

- Jung Ga-ram as Cha Sun-ho

Son of Cha Min-jae.

- Park Byung-eun as Hwang Dong-seok

Jung-won's husband. He is a chef of a popular cooking program.

- Ji Il-joo as Kwon Min-gyu

A teacher. He is bold and honest, and gets along with his students.

- Oh Jung-se as Kim Young-dae

Se-yeon's deceased husband. He was a sweet and caring man, who died when he left on a business trip to China.

- Kim Hee-jin as Yang Jin-gun

A divorce specialist who is also a Casanova, but he doesn't believe in love. Do Hwa-young's partner in work.

- Lee Hae-young as Cha Min-jae

Sun-ho's father. Eun-soo's lover.

- Jang Hee-jung as Baek Jae-hee
- Kim Min-soo as Kang Tae-oh
- Lee Sang-hee as Park Jung-sim
- Kim Ho-jung as Na Yoon-jung
- Choi Yu-hwa as Jin Hye-rim
- Joo Ye-rim as Jang Se-yeon's daughter

=== Special appearance ===
- Lee Ha-na (Ep. 12)

== Production ==
The first script reading was held on March 15, 2018 at Studio Dragon's main office in Sangam-dong, Seoul, South Korea.

== Ratings ==
Mistress : South Korea viewers per episode (millions)

| Season | Episode number | | | | | | | | | | | | Average |
| Season | 1 | 2 | 3 | 4 | 5 | 6 | 7 | 8 | 9 | 10 | 11 | 12 | Average |
|---|---|---|---|---|---|---|---|---|---|---|---|---|---|
| 1 | 358 | 320 | TBD | TBD | TBD | TBD | TBD | TBD | TBD | TBD | TBD | 397 | TBD |

Source: Audience measurement performed nationwide by Nielsen Media Research.

Average TV viewership ratings
| Ep. | Original broadcast date | Average audience share | | |
| Ep. | Original broadcast date | AGB Nielsen | | TNmS |
| Ep. | Original broadcast date | Nationwide | Seoul | Nationwide |
|---|---|---|---|---|
| 1 | April 28, 2018 | 1.601% | 1.673% | 1.4% |
| 2 | April 29, 2018 | 1.579% | 1.715% | 1.3% |
| 3 | May 5, 2018 | 0.826% | —N/a | 1.1% |
| 4 | May 6, 2018 | 0.831% | —N/a | 1.2% |
| 5 | May 12, 2018 | 0.873% | —N/a | 0.9% |
| 6 | May 13, 2018 | 1.366% | 1.619% | 1.3% |
| 7 | May 19, 2018 | 0.826% | —N/a | 1.0% |
| 8 | May 20, 2018 | 1.402% | 1.374% | 1.2% |
| 9 | May 26, 2018 | 1.115% | —N/a | 1.0% |
| 10 | May 27, 2018 | 1.469% | —N/a | 1.4% |
| 11 | June 2, 2018 | 1.275% | —N/a | 1.5% |
| 12 | June 3, 2018 | 1.642% | 1.700% | —N/a |
| Average | | 1.234% | 1.616% | 1.2% |
In the table above, the blue numbers represent the lowest ratings and the red numbers represent the highest ratings.; N/A denotes that the rating is not known.; This drama aired on a cable channel/pay TV which normally has a relatively smaller audience compared to free-to-air TV/public broadcasters (KBS, SBS, MBC and EBS).
