= WoongSan =

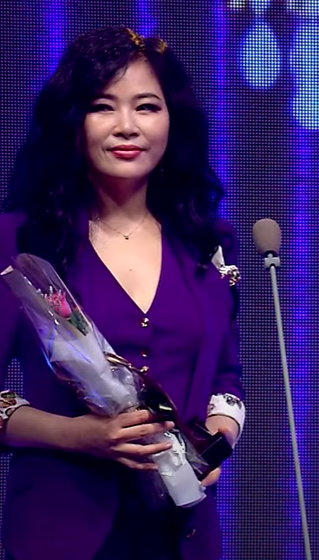
- WoongSan in 2021

Background information
- Born: Kim Eun Young; April 18, 1973 (age 53); Mungyeong, North Gyeongsang Province, South Korea
- Genres: Jazz, blues
- Occupation: Singer
- Years active: 1996–present
- Website: www.woongsanjazz.com

WoongSan (born Kim Eun Young, April 18, 1973) is a South Korean musician. She has been a leading figure in the jazz music scene in Korea and Japan for over a decade, having performed live over 500 times since her 1998 Japanese debut. She is the first Korean-born musician to perform at New York City's historic Blue Note Jazz Club and has collaborated with many other well-known jazz musicians including Benny Green, Lonnie Plaxico, Rodney Green, Conrad Herwig and Suzuki Hisatsugu. She is also well known for training Ali (South Korean singer), a popular K-pop singer.

== Biography ==
When she was 18, WoongSan spent a year and a half at a Buddhist temple in the Korean countryside. During her training she had a powerful realization: her calling in life was music. Initially she played in a college rock band, but after a friend played her a Billie Holiday record, she began to dedicate herself to jazz. She spent several years performing as a solo artist then released her first album accompanied by a jazz ensemble in 1996. By the end of 1998 she was a recognizable figure in both Korea and Japan, and since then, she has released six albums, garnered numerous awards and critical acclaim, and continues to tour prolifically. She has also written many songs for films.

Last year, she proved her career was an ongoing path as a music performer on the stage collaborated with Lee Ritenour.

== Style ==
WoongSan's style is a distinctive blend of jazz, blues, Latin and funk style. Her mid-low voice does not span as much tonal ground as other famous singers, but what she lacks in range she more than makes up for in creativity and malleability. As an independent lyricist, Woong San has penned powerful ballads, cozy love numbers and everything in between. Buddhism has played a prominent role in her life, and it shines through in her songwriting: she often explores the themes of freedom, mindfulness and the beauty of change in her songs. Her work has been described as "soulful, fearless, sultry."

== Discography ==
=== Studio albums ===
| Title | Album details | Peak chart positions | Sales |
| Title | Album details | KOR | Sales |
|---|---|---|---|
| Love Letters | Released: December 12, 2003; Label: Universal Music Group | — | |
| The Blues | Released: November 7, 2005; Label: Universal Music Group | — | |
| Yesterday | Released: July 19, 2007; Label: Universal Music Group | — | KOR: 7,140 |
| Fall in Love | Released: September 16, 2008; Label: Universal Music Group | — (Note: Fall in Love ranked number 44 on the monthly Music Industry Association of Korea album chart for September 2008.) | KOR: 2,593 |
| Miss Mister (1st Gift Album) | Released: October 6, 2009; Label: Universal Music Group | — | |
| Close Your Eyes | Released: March 17, 2010; Label: Universal Music Group | 17 | |
| Once I Loved (2nd Gift Album) | Released: October 4, 2011; Label: Universal Music Group | 41 | |
| Tomorrow | Released: October 4, 2011; Label: Universal Music Group | 23 | KOR: 1,280 |
| I Love You | Released: October 2, 2013; Label: Universal Music Group | 17 | KOR: 3,410 |
| Temptation | Released: August 12, 2015; Label: Universal Music Group | 17 | KOR: 1,393 |
| I'm Alright | Released: September 5, 2018; Label: Universal Music Group | — | |
| Love, Its Longing (사랑 그 그리움) | Released: May 13, 2020; Label: Universal Music Group | 48 | |
| Love, Its Longing, Vol. 2 (사랑 그 그리움2) | Released: January 18, 2022; Label: Universal Music Group | 98 | |
| Who Stole the Skies | Released: September 22, 2022; Label: Universal Music Group | — | |
| Love, Its Longing, Vol. 3 (사랑 그 그리움3) | Released: January 24, 2024; Label: Universal Music Group | 61 | KOR: 1,920 |

=== Compilation albums ===
| Title | Album details | Peak chart positions | Sales |
| Title | Album details | KOR | Sales |
|---|---|---|---|
| The Best | Released: November 13, 2014; Label: Universal Music Group | 17 | KOR: 1,461 |

=== Extended plays ===
| Title | Album details | Peak chart positions | Sales |
| Title | Album details | KOR | Sales |
|---|---|---|---|
| Jazz Is My Life | Released: November 1, 2016; Label: Universal Music Group | 40 | KOR: 732 |

=== Soundtrack appearances ===
- "Saranghagineun Hangeongayo..." (사랑하기는 한건가요...; Mom and Sister, 2000)
- "Sad Song" (Man of the Sun, Lee Je-ma, 2002)
- "Elegy" (Capital Scandal, 2007)
- "Fate" (인연; Iljimae, 2008)
- "Mascara De Un Payaso" (Private Eye, 2009)
- "Damned Love" (지독한사랑; The Slave Hunters, 2010)
- "If You Love Me" (It's Okay, Daddy's Girl, 2010)
- "Have It All!" (Miss Conspirator, 2012)
- "Love is Strong" (Babel, 2019)
- "One" (Love Affair In The Afternoon, 2019)
- "You Make Me" (Kiss Sixth Sense, 2022)

== Awards and nominations ==
| Award-giving body | Year | Category | Nominee/work | Result | Ref. |
|---|---|---|---|---|---|
| Jazz Critique's Jazz Audio Disc Awards | 2011 | Gold Prize – Vocals | Once I Loved | Won | |
| Jazz Critique's Jazz Audio Disc Awards | 2013 | Silver Prize – Vocals | I Love You | Won | |
| Korean Music Awards | 2008 | Best Jazz & Crossover Album | Yesterday | Won | |
| Korean Music Awards | 2008 | Best Jazz & Crossover Song | "Yesterday" | Won | |
| Korean Music Awards | 2008 | Musician of the Year | WoongSan | Nominated | |
| MBC Campus Music Festival | 1993 | Popular Singer Award | WoongSan | Won | |
| Swing Journal | 2010 | Gold Disk | Close Your Eyes | Won | |

=== State honors ===
Name of country, year given, and name of honor
| Country | Year | Honor | Ref. |
|---|---|---|---|
| South Korea (Note: Honors are given at the Korean Popular Culture and Arts Awards, arranged by the Korea Creative Content Agency and hosted by the Ministry of Culture, Sports and Tourism. They are awarded to those who have contributed to the arts and South Korea's pop culture.) | 2021 | Prime Minister's Commendation | |
