= Park Si-hoo =

South Korean actor (born 1977)

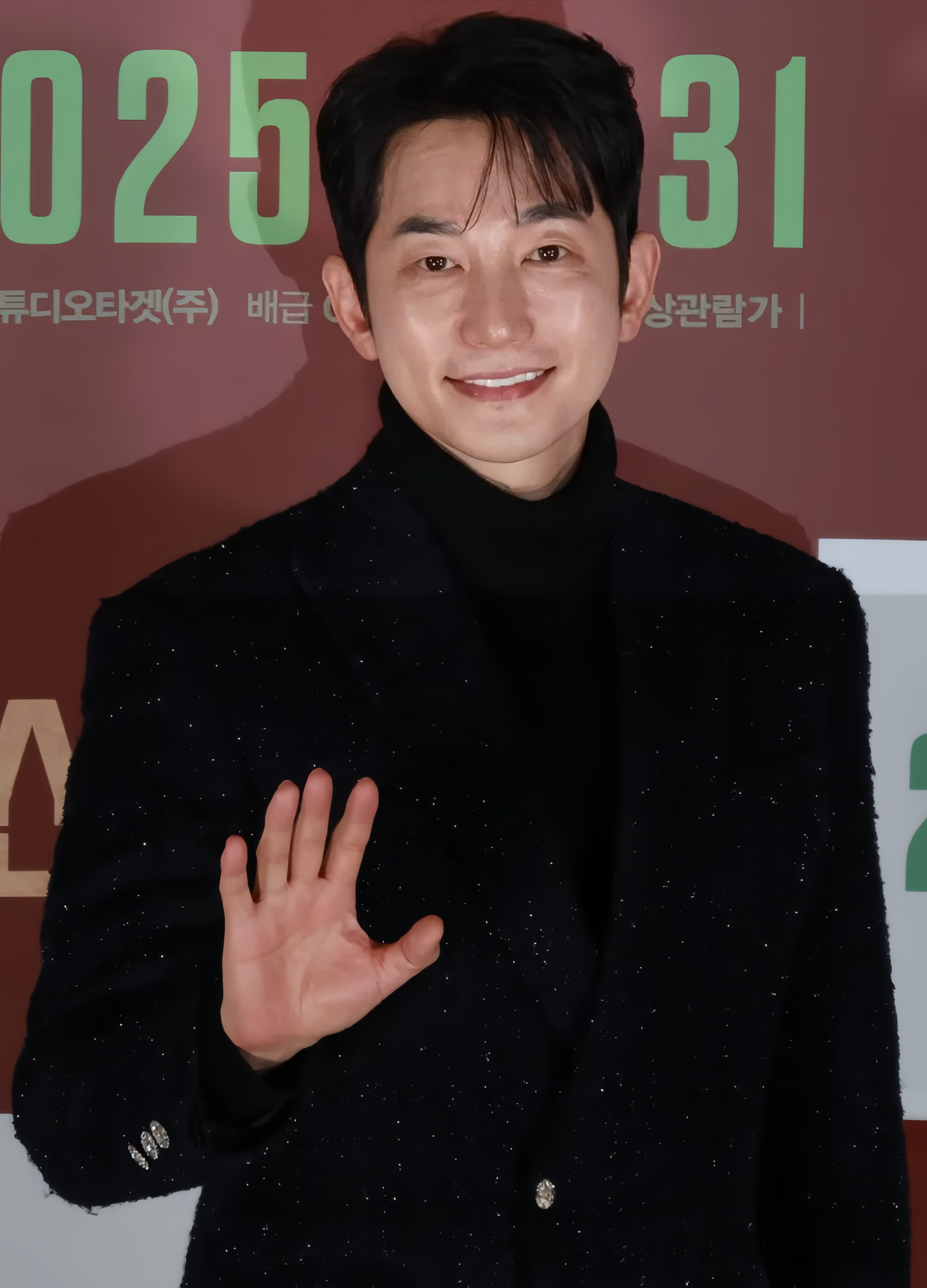
- Park in 2025
- Born: Park Pyeong-ho; February 15, 1977 (age 49); Eunsanmyeon, Buyeo County, South Chungcheong Province, South Korea
- Education: Hanyang University - Theater and Film
- Occupation: Actor
- Years active: 1993–present
- Agent: Hoo Factory

Korean name
- Hangul: 박평호
- Hanja: 朴平浩
- RR: Bak Pyeongho
- MR: Pak P'yŏngho

Stage name
- Hangul: 박시후
- Hanja: 朴施厚
- RR: Bak Sihu
- MR: Pak Sihu

Park Si-hoo (Korean: 박시후; born February 15, 1977), birth name Park Pyeong-ho, is a South Korean actor. He began his entertainment career as an underwear model and stage actor, then made his official television debut in 2005. After several years in supporting roles, Park rose to fame in 2010 with the popular romantic comedy series Queen of Reversals and Prosecutor Princess. This was followed by leading roles in period drama The Princess' Man (2011) and thriller film Confession of Murder (2012).

== Career ==
=== 1997–1999: Beginnings ===
Park Pyeong-ho began his acting career in theater in 1997, putting up posters, handing out flyers, and appearing as an extra or in bit parts on stage, leading to his acting debut in the play The Twelve Nyang Life. During this time, he also worked as an underwear model, before being cast in a bit part in episodes 1 and 2 of 2005 television series Sassy Girl Chun-hyang.

=== 2007–2010: Rising popularity ===
Under the stage name Park Si-hoo, he starred in supporting roles in the MBC TV series Let's Get Married and Which Star Are You From?. With How to Meet a Perfect Neighbor in 2007, he gained more recognition and won the New Star Award at the SBS Drama Awards that year. More high-profile roles in action adventure series Iljimae and weekend drama Family's Honor (the latter, his first leading role) followed in 2008.

But Park's breakthrough would come in 2010. As the mysterious lawyer Seo In-woo in Prosecutor Princess, he rose to fame and the term "Seo Byun syndrome" was coined for his growing fanbase. And such was his popularity with audiences in Queen of Reversals that when the series was extended, screenwriter Park Ji-eun rewrote the script so that his character, chaebol businessman Gu Yong-shik, would end up with the heroine. He later won an Excellence Award at the MBC Drama Awards for Queen of Reversals.

He continued his success in 2011 with the Joseon period drama The Princess' Man, a critical and ratings hit. Park's portrayal of a man torn between revenge and love for his enemy's daughter garnered him a Top Excellence Award at the KBS Drama Awards. Fan meetings in Asian countries such as Japan, China and Taiwan further cemented his status as a Hallyu star. He also recorded the Christmas single "Winter Story," along with other stars from his then-agency Eyagi Entertainment.

=== 2012–2016: Transitioning roles ===
In 2012, Park played his first big-screen leading role as a serial killer-turned-bestselling author in the film Confession of Murder. After shooting the 80-minute music video "Boy" in Thailand (which was released on DVD), he returned to television later that year in the romance drama Cheongdam-dong Alice.

Park's career was temporarily halted in 2013 when he was involved in a highly publicized sexual assault case (charges were later dropped when the alleged victim withdrew her complaint).

For his comeback, Park was reportedly considering taking on the leading role in 2014 series Golden Cross, but continuing public outrage regarding his 2013 case led broadcaster KBS to cancel his casting, with the Corea Entertainment Management Association stating that "Park still needs more time." Instead, he focused on overseas activities, holding a photo exhibition in Japan titled The Man Who Was There, and starring in the 2014 Chinese film Scent, directed by Jessey Tsang Tsui-Shan. He also filmed the Korean-Chinese co-produced drama film After Love opposite Yoon Eun-hye. Two years after his controversy, Park returned in 2015 in the cable series Local Hero, in which he plays a former undercover agent who mentors a young police officer as they fight crime together.

=== 2017–present: Worldwide success ===
In 2017, Park was cast in KBS2 weekend drama My Golden Life. The drama was a major hit in South Korea and surpassed 40% ratings.

In 2018, Park was cast in KBS's romance horror series Lovely Horribly alongside Song Ji-hyo. In 2019, Park starred in mystery melodrama Babel. In 2020, Park Starred in TV chosun's sageuk drama King Maker : The Change of Destiny. The drama was a huge success in South Korea, with reach 6,3% rating, a very high rating for a TV Cable. In 2021, Park was cast in a leading role in Korean's version of popular American series "The Mentalist" alongside Lee Si Young (Sweet Home). In 2024, Park was cast as Park Gyo Sun, a North Korean officer in the first musical movie set in North Korea along with 2AM member, Jung Jin Woon titled "Choir of God". He also appear in TV Chosun's "Dad&Me" with his father from January 2024.

In March 2025, Park confirmed to get his first villain role after 20 years entertainment industry career in an upcoming Korean movie thriller "Karma" as Kim Moo Young.

In February 2026, his movie "Choir of God" received a warm response from Korean audiences, surpassing 1 million viewers and beating Hollywood blockbuster movies such as Avatar: Fire and Ash and Zootopia 2.

== Personal life ==
His father Park Yong-hoon used to be a fashion and commercial model in the 1960s and 1970s, and his younger brother Park Wu-ho is a former baseball player for the Hyundai Unicorns.

On February 18, 2013, Park was accused of allegedly raping a 22-year-old aspiring actress. The woman said that after drinking heavily at a bar in Gangnam District, she and Park went to his apartment in Cheongdam-dong at around 2:00 a.m. on February 15, where she lost consciousness and realized she had been raped when she woke up. In a statement released through his management agency, Park denied the allegation; he admitted that he had sex with the woman but claimed it was consensual. Ultimately, the woman dropped all complaints, and no verdict was ever reached. In addition, the police found crucial evidence from KakaoTalk chats between woman 'A' and her friend, where 'A' stated she was going to "show her best acting skills to make it seem like she's the biggest victim."

In late 2021, after completing the shooting of The Mentalist, Park was diagnosed with Chronic Obstructive Pulmonary Disease (COPD). His symptoms were initially suspected to be leukemia after suffering from two weeks of nosebleeds; however, the test results were negative. The illness forced Park to undergo a three-year hiatus before making a comeback in Dad and Me variety show, and filming new movie Choir of God. He lost approximately 19 kilograms during the course of his treatment.

== Filmography ==
=== Film ===
Year	Title	Role
2000	Chunhyang	Extra
2012	Confession of Murder	Lee Doo-seok / Jung Hyun-sik
2014	Scent	Kang In-joon
2018	After Love	Kim Sung-joon
2025	Choir of God	Park Gyo-sun
2026	Karma	Kim Moo-young

=== Television series ===
Year	Title	Role
1998	White Nights 3.98	
2005	Sassy Girl Chun-hyang	Hong Chae-rin's ex-boyfriend
2005	Let's Get Married	Kang Jae-ho
2006	Which Star Are You From?	Han Jeong-hoon
2007	How to Meet a Perfect Neighbor	Yoo Joon-seok
2008	Iljimae	Shi-hoo / Cha-dol
2008	Family's Honor	Lee Kang-seok
2010	Queen of Reversals	Gu Yong-shik
2010	Prosecutor Princess	Seo In-woo
2011	The Princess' Man	Kim Seung-yoo
2012	Cheongdam-dong Alice	Cha Seung-jo
2016	Local Hero	Baek Si-yoon
2017	My Golden Life	Choi Do-Kyung
2018	Lovely Horribly	Yoo Phillip
2019	Babel	Cha Woo-hyeok
2020	Kingmaker: The Change of Destiny	Choi Cheon-joong
TBA	The Mentalist	

=== Television shows ===
Year	Title	Role
2019	A Man Who Feeds The Dog (Season 4)	Cast member
2024	Dad & Me	Cast member

=== Music video appearances ===
Year	Song title	Artist
2005	"Happiness"	Gavy NJ
2005	"I Will Still Live"	Gavy NJ
2006	"I Love You"	Alex Chu and Jisun
2006	"Very Heartbreaking Words"	Alex Chu and Jisun
2009	"Taste of Separation"	Kim Bum-soo
2009	"I'll Be Pretty"	Taru

== Accolades ==
=== Awards and nominations ===
Year	Award	Category	Nominated work	Result
2007	SBS Drama Awards	New Star Award	How to Meet a Perfect Neighbor	Won
2009	2009 SBS Drama Awards	Excellence Award, Actor in a Special Planning Drama	Family's Honor	Won
2010	MBC Drama Awards	Excellence Award, Actor	Queen of Reversals	Won
2010	2010 SBS Drama Awards	Excellence Award, Actor in a Drama Special	Prosecutor Princess	Nominated
2011	Style Icon Awards	SIA's Discovery	—N/a	Won
2011	KBS Drama Awards	Best Couple Award with Moon Chae-won	The Princess' Man	Won
2011	KBS Drama Awards	Popularity Award	The Princess' Man	Won
2011	KBS Drama Awards	Excellence Award, Actor in a Mid-length Drama	The Princess' Man	Nominated
2011	KBS Drama Awards	Top Excellence Award, Actor	The Princess' Man	Won
2012	48th Baeksang Arts Awards	Best Actor (TV)	The Princess' Man	Nominated
2012	Seoul International Drama Awards	Outstanding Korean Actor	The Princess' Man	Nominated
2012	Monte-Carlo Television Festival	Outstanding Actor in a Drama Series	The Princess' Man	Nominated
2013	50th Grand Bell Awards	Best New Actor	Confession of Murder	Nominated
2015	Luxury Brand Model Awards	Hallyu Asia Top Star Award	—N/a	Won
2017	KBS Drama Awards	Excellence Award, Actor in a Serial Drama	My Golden Life	Won
2017	KBS Drama Awards	Best Couple with Shin Hye-sun	My Golden Life	Won
2018	11th Korea Drama Awards	Top Excellence Award, Actor	My Golden Life	Nominated
2018	6th APAN Star Awards	Top Excellence Award, Actor in a Serial Drama	My Golden Life	Nominated
2018	KBS Drama Awards	Excellence Award, Actor in a Miniseries	Lovely Horribly	Nominated
2018	KBS Drama Awards	Netizen Award Actor	Lovely Horribly	Nominated
2018	KBS Drama Awards	Best Couple Award with Song Ji-hyo	Lovely Horribly	Nominated

=== Listicles ===
Name of publisher, year listed, name of listicle, and placement
Publisher	Year	Listicle	Placement	Ref.
Forbes	2012	Korea Power Celebrity	28th	
