= Intruder (2020 film) =

- Theatrical release poster
- Hangul: 침입자
- Hanja: 侵入者
- RR: Chimipja
- MR: Ch'imipcha
- Directed by: Sohn Won-pyung
- Written by: Sohn Won-pyung
- Produced by: Jang Won-suk; Park Kyung-won
- Starring: Song Ji-hyo; Kim Mu-yeol
- Edited by: Kim Chang-ju
- Music by: Kim Tae-hoon
- Production company: B.A. Entertainment
- Distributed by: Acemaker Movieworks
- Release date: June 4, 2020
- Running time: 102 minutes
- Country: South Korea
- Language: Korean
- Box office: US$4.2 million

Intruder (Korean: 침입자; RR: Chimipja) is a 2020 South Korean mystery thriller film written and directed by Sohn Won-pyung, starring Song Ji-hyo and Kim Mu-yeol. The story is about Yoo-jin who returns home after going missing 25 years ago. As their family gradually begins to change after her return, her older brother Seo-jin grows suspicious and seeks to uncover his sister's secret, which leads him to a shocking truth. It was released on June 4, 2020. The movie will be available exclusively on iQIYI with multi-languages subtitles in Singapore, Malaysia, Brunei, Vietnam and Philippines in September.

== Plot ==
Kang Seo-jin (Kim Mu-yeol) is an architect who lost his wife nearly six months ago in a hit and run accident. Stricken with the grief of not finding the driver responsible, he struggles to manage his work and take care of his daughter.

Seo-jin's daughter Ye-na still doesn't know about her mother's death. Seo jin gets a call from an orphanage that claims that his long-lost sister was found after 25 years, Kang Yoo-jin (Song Ji-hyo). He meets her but neither have clear memories about what happened on the day of her abduction. The family goes to the hospital where Yoo-jin works and meet a fellow nurse, Yeon-joo, who praises Yoo-jin.

Yoo-jin soon wins over her entire family. Seo-jin's parents and daughter start acting different with him and instead listen to only Yoo-jin. Seo-jin becomes suspicious and wonders if she is really his lost sister. The police inform him about new evidence in his wife's accident. He notices Yoo-jin in the footage, making him even more suspicious. He consults his psychiatrist friend for hypnosis therapy. He sees the driver who hit his wife and his "sister" watching from a distance. He goes to the orphanage but finds that it doesn't exist. He then discovers that Yeon-joo was hired by Yoo-jin to tell her family about her being a nurse. Enraged, he reveals this to his family. Yoo-jin apologizes and says she wanted to create a good impression. Their mother faints and is taken to hospital, where Seo-jin manages to get a strand of Yoo-jin's hair. He takes the sample for a DNA analysis.

One night Seo-jin gets a call from a realtor that there is someone in his old home. When he gets there, he finds Yeon-joo's dead body and faints. He wakes up tied by the man who killed his wife. The man tells Seo-jin that he was the one who called him from the "orphanage" and that killing his wife was unintentional. He tells Seo-jin that they have a religious cult where they worship "The Chosen Holy Child." They abduct girls and perform rituals on the child and their believers worship the child. The chosen child now is Ye-na. Seo-jin kills the man and comes home only to find police. The police and Seo-jin's friend believe that Seo-jin is behaving wildly because of his medication. They arrest him. Yoo-jin confesses to him that she had met his wife and made her join their cult.

Seo-jin flees from police as Yoo-jin tries to escape with Ye-na. They get into a tussle, culminating in Yoo-jin about to fall off a cliff. She pleads with Seo-jin not to let go but he leaves her to fall after remembering what happened on the day of his sister's abduction, telling her that even if she were his real sister, she could never be their family. The film ends with Seo-jin shredding the DNA analysis he requested without looking at the result.

== Cast ==
- Song Ji-hyo as Yoo-jin
- Kim Mu-yeol as Seo-jin
- Ye Soo-jung as Yoon-hee
- Choi Sang-hoon as Seong-cheol
- Park Min-ha as Jena
- Heo Joon-seok as Detective Joo
- Lee Hae-woon as Sang-goo
- Choi Young-woo as Yeong-choon
- Lee Je-yeon as Beom-seok
- Jang Sung-yoon as Yeon-joo
- So Hee-jung as Jeong-im

== Production ==
Early working title of the series is Daughter.

Mystery thriller film Intruder (screenwriter Son Won-pyeong, distributed by ACEMaker Movie Works, produced by BA Entertainment) confirmed the lead cast and started shooting on February 13, 2019.

== Release ==
Intruder was originally set to be released on March 12, 2020 but was postponed because of COVID-19 pandemic outbreak. It was later scheduled to be released on May 21, 2020. but was pushed back again to June 4, 2020 due to the Itaewon Club incident which COVID-19 spread throughout Itaewon again.

=== International ===
Following the release in South Korea on June 4, 2020 Intruder is confirmed to be released in 26 countries around the world including Taiwan, Vietnam, Thailand, Russia and Malaysia.

In Malaysia, Intruder was released on July 23, 2020 and debut at #2 on GSC Cinemas and TGV cinemas' Top 10 Movies, losing only to Train To Busan Presents: Peninsula.

== Reception ==
On June 5, the Korean Film Council officially announced that Intruder which premiered the day before, had drawn a total of 49,578 moviegoers to theaters on the first day of its release.

Although the number would be modest by normal standards, the figure marks the highest number of first-day moviegoers achieved by any film since the COVID-19 outbreak began disrupting daily life in South Korea. The last film to surpass 40,000 moviegoers at the Korean box office on its first day was Beasts Clawing at Straws released 107 days prior on February 19—and widely considered the last film to be released in Korea before the COVID-19 outbreak effectively shut down the movie theater industry.

Intruder topped its first weekend box office with 238,417 admissions and constituted 63.3% of the total ticket sales.

In Malaysia, Intruder placed at Top 2 Box Office Movies in GSC Cinemas on the weekend for two consecutive weeks after its screening on July 23, 2020.
