= Homme Fatale =

- Theatrical release poster
- Hangul: 기방도령
- RR: Gibangdoryeong
- MR: Kibangdoryŏng
- Directed by: Nam Dae-joong
- Starring: Lee Jun-ho; Jung So-min; Choi Gwi-hwa; Ye Ji-won; Gong Myung
- Production companies: Pancinema; JYP Pictures
- Distributed by: CJ Entertainment
- Release date: 10 July 2019 (South Korea)
- Running time: 110 minutes
- Country: South Korea
- Language: Korean
- Box office: US$1.9 million

Homme Fatale (Korean: 기방도령) is a South Korean historical comedy-drama film released on 10 July 2019. Set in the Joseon period, it is a historical comedy film that depicts the life of Heo-saek, the dynasty's first male courtesan. The film was directed by Nam Dae-joong, and stars Lee Jun-ho, Jung So-min, Choi Gwi-hwa, Ye Ji-won, and Gong Myung.

== Storyline ==
The son of a kisaeng, Heo-saek (Lee Junho) grew up surrounded by the lovely ladies who worked alongside his mother at his aunt's popular gibang, Yeonpoonggak. Well acquainted with the suffering and oppression these beautiful women of Joseon were forced to endure, Heo-saek decided at a young age to ease their suffering by helping them any way that he could. True to his word, when his aunt's business begins to fail, Heo-saek takes it upon himself to help by becoming the first-ever male gisaeng. A charming bachelor with unquestionable good-looks, Heo-saek's unorthodox debut makes him an overnight success. Drawing the attention of women from far and wide, Heo-saek is more than capable of winning the heart of any woman he meets. Or so he thought. A beauty among beauties, Hae-won (Jung So-min) has no trouble capturing the attention of men. But as soon as she opens her mouth, her sharp mind and progressive thinking send them running. Instantly attracted to Hae-won's beauty, Heo-saek turns on the charm and is shocked to find that Hae-won isn't the least bit impressed. Determined to find out what makes this woman tick, Heo-saek won't let Hae-won go so easily. On a journey of her own, to find her one true love, is it possible the man Hae-won has been searching for her entire life is the beautiful gisaeng standing before her?

== Cast ==
- Lee Jun-ho as Huh Saek
- Jung So-min as Hae-won
  - Lee Il-hwa as old Hae-won
- Choi Gwi-hwa as Yuk-gam
- Ye Ji-won as Nan-seol
- Gong Myung as Yu-sang
- Jeon No-min as old man
- Shin Eun-soo as Suk-jeong
- Cho Yi-hyun as Su-yang
- Baek Joo-hee as Yeol-nyeo

== See also ==
- Gisaeng
