= Jang Hee-jung =

South Korean actress (born 1982)

- Born: 27 August 1982 (age 44); Seoul, South Korea
- Other name: Jang Hee-jeong
- Education: Myongji College (Department of Theater and Film); Russian Institute of Theatre Arts (Bachelor of Actors)
- Occupation: Actress
- Years active: 2009–present
- Agent(s): H & Entertainment
- Known for: Three Bold Siblings; Mistress; Late Night Restaurant
- Spouse: Ahn Chang-hwan (m. 2013)
- Children: 1

Korean name
- Hangul: 장희정
- RR: Jang Huijeong
- MR: Chang Hŭijŏng

Jang Hee-jung (Korean: 장희정; born August 27, 1982) is a South Korean actress. She is known for her roles in dramas such as Mistress, Hospital Playlist, Late Night Restaurant, Voice 2 and Three Bold Siblings.

== Personal life ==
She married actor Ahn Chang-hwan and has one son.

== Filmography ==
=== Television series ===
Year	Title	Role	Ref.
2015	Late Night Restaurant	Spicy Noodles sister	
2015	Reply 1988	National Singing contest judge	
2017	Drama Stage: "Today I Grab the Tambourine Again"	Lee Da-ri	
2018	Voice 2	Baek Mi-ja / Wang Ok-ryeo	
2018	Mistress	Baek Jae-hee	
2020	Hospital Playlist	Bit-na's mother	
2022	Three Bold Siblings	Hoo Yong-sil	
2023	Like Flowers in Sand	Ahn Hyun-jin	
2024	TvN O'PENing: Grand Shining Hotel	Kim Tae-ri	
2024	Iron Family	Kang Soo-jin	
2024	Check-in Hanyang	Member	

=== Film ===
Year	Title	Role	Ref.
2018	Lenders: Soul and Cash	Ahn-won	

== Theatre ==
Year	Title	Korean Title	Role	Ref.
2009	Twelfth	십이야	Hee-jung	
2010	Catch the Gnome - Encore	그놈을 잡아라 - 앵콜	Detective Lim	
2011	I'm getting married in May	오월엔 결혼할꺼야	Uhm Jeong-eun	
2011	Full Bloom	됴화만발	Dan-yi	
2012	I love you so	순이야 사랑해	Gyeong-ja	
2012	Samguk Yusa Project - My Cheoyong goes to the market at night to buy sheep	삼국유사 프로젝트 - 나의 처용은 밤이면 양들을 사러 마켓에 간다	Pong-nyeo	
2013	Beautiful Stranger	아름다운 낯선여인	Roselle	
2014	Trans Twelfth	트랜스 십이야	Hee-jung	
2018	Tchaikovsky's Secret Confession	차이콥스키의 비밀스러운 고백	Ha-na	
