= Choir of God =

2025 film by Kim Hyung-hyup

- Theatrical release poster
- Hangul: 신의악단
- RR: Sinuiakdan
- MR: Sinŭiaktan
- Directed by: Kim Hyung-hyup
- Written by: Kim Hwang-seok
- Produced by: Kim Do-yeon
- Starring: Park Si-hoo; Jeong Jin-woon
- Cinematography: Park Min-woo
- Music by: Kim Jun-seong; Seo Jeong-su; Lee Isaac
- Production company: Studio Target
- Distributed by: CJ CGV
- Release date: December 31, 2025
- Running time: 110 minutes
- Country: South Korea
- Language: Korean
- Box office: US$9.1 million

Choir of God (Korean: 신의악단) is a 2025 South Korean musical drama film directed by Kim Hyung-hyup. Based on a true story, it features an ensemble cast led by Park Si-hoo and Jeong Jin-woon. Distributed by CJ CGV, the film was released in South Korea on December 31, 2025.

== Synopsis ==
With its financial lifelines cut off by international sanctions, North Korea seeks to secure foreign aid by agreeing to stage a religious revival. Under orders from the ruling party, the Ministry of State Security is tasked with creating North Korea's first-ever fake propaganda praise troupe.

== Cast ==
- Park Si-hoo as Park Kyo-sun
- Jeong Jin-woon as Captain Kim
- Tae Hang-ho as Kim Seong-cheol
- Go Hye-jin as Lee Soo-rim
- Nam Tae-hoon as Kim Chang-soo
- Choi Seon-ja as Yang Seon-ja
- Moon Kyung-min as Oh Cheol-ho
- Shin Han-gyeol as Lee Jung-hee
- Seo Dong-won as Bae Guk-seong
- Kang Seung-wan as Choi Jeong-cheol
- Yoon Je-moon as Director of the 5th Department
- Gi Ju-bong as standing committee member

== Production ==
=== Development ===
The screenplay is based on a draft by Kim Hwang-sung, with later adaptations incorporating input from a North Korean defector to ensure linguistic and cultural accuracy. The narrative draws partial inspiration from the construction of Chilgol Church in Pyongyang and historical religious exchanges in North Korea during the 1990s.

=== Filming ===
Filming took place in Mongolia over approximately six weeks beginning in February 2024, under extreme winter conditions.

== Release ==
The film was released theatrically on December 31, 2025, on 496 screens.

== Reception ==
Following its release on December 31, Choir of God recorded a 41.2% seat occupancy rate on January 1, ranking first among Korean films for the day. The film surpassed 1.15 million admissions following its release, achieving sustained box office growth driven by word-of-mouth and group screenings. After initially debuting outside the top ranks, the film later reached number one at the Korean box office in early February.
