= So Hee-jung =

South Korean actress (born 1973)

- Born: May 28, 1973 (age 53); Seoul, South Korea
- Other name: So Hee-jeong
- Education: Graduated in Theater and Film
- Alma mater: University of Suwon, Department of Theater and Film
- Occupations: Actress; theater actor
- Years active: 1994–present
- Agent: EL Park

Korean name
- Hangul: 소희정
- RR: So Huijeong
- MR: So Hŭijŏng

So Hee-jung (Korean: 소희정; born May 28, 1973) is a South Korean actress. She made her acting debut in 1994 in theater, since then, she has appeared in number of plays, films and television series. She got recognition for her supporting roles in The K2 (2016), Bossam: Steal the Fate (2021), Twenty-Five Twenty-One and Shooting Stars (2022). She has acted in films such as: Sunny (2011) and Intruder (2020) among others.

== Education ==
So Hee-jung completed the Department of Theater at Dongguk University Graduate School and Graduated from University of Suwon, Department of Theater and Film.

== Career ==
So Hee-jung started her career in theatres and made her debut in television in 2006 and in films in 2011. She appeared in film Sunny (2011), and TV series Angry Mom (2015), My Father Is Strange (2017), Psychopath Diary (2019), No Matter What, and Kairos (2020).

In 2022, she was cast in romantic TV series Twenty-Five Twenty-One as mother of lead character. The series was one of the highest-rated Korean dramas in cable television history. In the same year, she is appearing in tvN's romantic comedy Shooting Stars as housekeeper, and cast in tvN's drama Eve, which will begin airing from June 1.

== Filmography ==
=== Films ===
Year	Title	Role	Notes	Ref(s)
2011	Sunny	Homeroom teacher		
2011	Stateless Things	Sook-in		
2013	Happiness for Sale	Married couple woman		
2013	Flu	Homeroom teacher		
2014	The Plan Man	Kyeong-mi		
2014	The Stone	Kyeong-ja		
2014	Tazza: The Hidden Card	Kko-jang house gambling couple		
2015	Twenty	Kyung-jae's mother		
2015	The Sound of a Flower	Court lady		
2016	Don't Forget Me	Psychiatrist		
2017	The King	Ji-min's mother		
2018	Golden Slumber	Stay-at-home Mom		
2018	On Your Wedding Day	Woo-yeon's mother	Cameo	
2019	Birthday	Seok-won's mom		
2019	Miss & Mrs. Cops	Seo-jin's mother		
2019	Man of Men	Sanatorium director		
2020	Intruder	Jeong-im		
2020	#Alive	Joon-woo's mother		

=== Television series ===
Year	Title	Role	Notes	Ref(s)
2006	Smile Again	Ma Sook-hyang		
2011	I Need Romance	Gynecologist		
2011	Ojakgyo Family			
2011	Special Affairs Team TEN			
2012	Moon Embracing the Sun			
2012	Man from the Equator			
2012	Queen and I			
2012	Big			
2012	Reply 1997	Senior writer		
2012–2013	Only Because It's You			
2012–2013	Seoyoung, My Daughter	Jo Myeong-soon		
2012	The Third Hospital			
2012	Innocent Man			
2013	Drama Special Series: "Their Perfect Day"		Season 3, episode 24	
2013	The Queen of Office	Super home shopping host		
2013	Ugly Alert			
2013	Don't Look Back: The Legend of Orpheus	Kim Young-joo		
2013	Two Weeks	Madam Jeong		
2013	The Eldest			
2013	Secret Love	Prison officer		
2013	The Heirs	Kim Yeong-joo		
2014	Inspiring Generation	Mok Po-daek		
2014	12 Years Promise			
2014	Everybody Say Kimchi	Producer Park Kyeong-eun		
2014	Blade Man	Little mom		
2014	Love & Secret	Nurse Min Yeong-hee		
2014	Punch	Bus driver's wife		
2014	Love & Secret	Nurse Min Yeong-hee		
2015	Angry Mom	Yi-kyung's mother		
2015	Divorce Lawyer in Love	Jo Sin-hee	Special appearance	
2015	KBS Drama Special: "What Is the Ghost Up To?"	Goo Cheon-dong's mother	Season 6, episode 5	
2015	Yong-pal	Nun		
2015	All About My Mom			
2015	Cheo Yong	Autopsy doctor	Season 2	
2015	My First Time	Choi Hoon's mother		
2016	Happy Home	Oh Min-jeong		
2016	The K2	Head of JSS medical team		
2016	The Bacchus Lady	Sevilo Song's daughter-in-law		
2016–2017	Solomon's Perjury	Woo-hyeok's mother		
2017	My Father Is Strange	Yoo-joo's mother		
2017	The Guardians	Lee Eun-ja		
2017	The Lady in Dignity	Oh Poong-sook		
2017	Avengers Social Club			
2017–2018	Reverse	Hong Cho-hee		
2018	Voice 2	Moo Mi-sook	Season 2	
2018	Tale of Fairy	Jeong Yi-hyeon's mother		
2019	Hotel del Luna	Lee Se-yeong, doctor's wife	(Ep. 12)	
2019	Doctor John	Yoo Ri-hye's older sister		
2019	When the Devil Calls Your Name	Jeong Seon-sim		
2019	Welcome 2 Life	Joo Yeong-ok		
2019	Psychopath Diary	Na In Hye		
2020	Kairos	Jung Hye-kyeong		
2021	Scripting Your Destiny	Yang Mi-soon		
2021	Bossam: Steal the Fate	Royal Consort So-ui		
2021	At a Distance, Spring Is Green	Cha Jung-joo		
2021–2022	The One and Only	Moon Young-ji		
2022	Twenty-Five Twenty-One	Ji Seung-wan's mother		
2022	Shooting Stars	Kwon Myung-hee		
2022	Eve	Kim Gye-yeong		
2023	Oasis	Jeom Am-daek		
2023	Miraculous Brothers	Cha Young-sook		

=== Web series ===
Year	Title	Role	Ref(s)
2020	The Temperature of Language: Our Nineteen	Kim Soon-myeong	
2021	The Witch's Diner	Seo Ae-sook	
2021	One Ordinary Day	Hong Ae-kyeong	
2022	Miracle	Lee So-rin's mother	

=== Theater ===
Year	Title	Role	Ref(s)
2007	Knock Knock Knock	Mother	
2008	Kiss - (2008 Seoul International Performing Arts Festival)		
2009	Three Sisters	Natasha	
2010	Wife's Outing	Daughter-in-law	
