= Babel (TV series) =

2019 South Korean television series

- Promotional poster
- Also known as: Tower of Babel
- Hangul: 바벨
- RR: Babel
- MR: Pabel
- Genre: Melodrama; Revenge
- Created by: TV Chosun
- Written by: Kwon Soon-won; Park Sang-wook
- Directed by: Yoon Sung-sik
- Starring: Park Si-hoo; Jang Hee-jin
- Music by: Seol Ki-tae; Gaemi
- Composers: Seol Ki-tae; Gaemi
- Country of origin: South Korea
- Original language: Korean
- No. of episodes: 16

Production
- Executive producer: Oh Nam-seok
- Running time: 60 minutes
- Production companies: HIGROUND; WantsMaker Pictures

Original release
- Network: TV Chosun
- Release: January 27 – March 24, 2019

Babel (Korean: 바벨) is a 2019 South Korean television series starring Park Si-hoo and Jang Hee-jin. The series aired on TV Chosun from January 27 to March 24, 2019 on Saturdays and Sundays at 22:50 (KST).

== Synopsis ==
The story of a prosecutor who would do anything to achieve his revenge and an actress who loses everything after marrying into a rich family.

== Cast ==
=== Main ===
- Park Si-hoo as Cha Woo-hyuk, former newspaper reporter now working as a prosecutor
- Jang Hee-jin as Han Jeong-won, former actress married to Tae Min-ho

=== Supporting ===
- Kim Hae-sook as Sin Hyeon-sook, wife of Tae Byeong-cheo
- Jang Shin-young as Tae Yoo-ra, daughter of Tae Byeong-cheo and younger sister of Tae Soo-ho, Cha Woo-Hyuk's boss at prosecutor's office whom she also has a crush on
- Kim Ji-hoon as Tae Min-ho, youngest son of Tae Byeong-cheo, designated successor to head Geosan
- Song Jae-hee as Tae Soo-ho, oldest son of Tae Byeong-cheo
- Im Jung-eun as Na Yeong-eun, daughter of the owner of the newspaper company, wife of Tae Soo-ho
- Kim Jong-goo as Tae Byeong-cheo, chairman of chaebol Geosan
- Lee Seung-hyung as Sin Hyeon-cheol, younger cousin and co-conspirator of Sin Hyeon-sook, director of Geosan
- Song Won-geun as Secretary Woo, personal assistant to Tae min-ho
- Ha Si-eun as Hong Mi-seon, who runs a Spanish restaurant, best friends with Han Jeong-won
- Yoon Bong-gil as Detective Lee
- Lee Jae-gu as Ricky
- Park Joo-hyung as Go Jae-il, newspaper reporter who was a colleague of Cha Woo-Hyuk, boyfriend of Hong Mi-seon
- Yoon Jin-ho as Jang Bae-yoon
- Kyung Sung-hwan as Kwon Byeon, lawyer and mentee of Tae Yoo-ra
- Ri Min as Gook Gwa-soo
- Kim Jin-ho as Chief prosecutor

== Production ==
The first script reading took place on November 20, 2018 at TV Chosun Broadcasting Station in Sangam, South Korea.

== Original soundtrack ==
Babel OST

Soundtrack album by Various Artists
- Released: 2019
- Genre: Soundtrack
- Languages: Korean; English
- Label: Warner Music Korea

=== Part 1 ===
Released on February 3, 2019
No.	Title	Artist	Length
1.	"Cry"	Kim Yong-jin (Bohemian)	4:07
2.	"Cry" (Inst.)		4:07
Total length:			8:14

=== Part 2 ===
Released on February 23, 2019
No.	Title	Artist	Length
1.	"Love Is Strong"	WoongSan	3:29
2.	"Love Is Strong" (Inst.)		3:29
Total length:			6:58

=== Part 3 ===
Released on February 27, 2019
No.	Title	Artist	Length
1.	"The Things You Want" (당신이 원하는 것)	uangelvoice	4:20
2.	"The Things You Want" (Inst.)		4:20
Total length:			8:40

=== Part 4 ===
Released on March 2, 2019
No.	Title	Artist	Length
1.	"You're My Everything"	John Park	5:23
2.	"You're My Everything" (Inst.)		5:23
Total length:			10:46

== Ratings ==
Babel : South Korea viewers per episode (thousands)

Season	Episode number																Average
Season	1	2	3	4	5	6	7	8	9	10	11	12	13	14	15	16	Average
1	639	500	524	576	581	525	608	559	610	662	556	670	591	717	568	579	592

Source: Audience measurement performed nationwide by Nielsen Media Research.

Average TV viewership ratings
Ep.	Original broadcast date	Average audience share (AGB Nielsen)	
Ep.	Original broadcast date	Nationwide	Seoul
1	2018/02/26	3.532%	4.321%
2	2018/02/27	2.509%	2.653%
3	2018/03/05	2.838%	3.603%
4	2018/03/06	3.281%	3.625%
5	2018/03/12	2.929%	3.364%
6	2018/03/13	2.691%	3.042%
7	2018/03/19	3.231%	3.605%
8	2018/03/20	2.768%	2.487%
9	2018/03/26	3.352%	4.005%
10	2018/03/27	3.421%	3.957%
11	2018/04/02	2.929%	2.811%
12	2018/04/03	3.713%	4.058%
13	2018/04/09	3.197%	3.125%
14	2018/04/10	3.643%	3.981%
15	2018/04/16	3.207%	3.418%
16	2018/04/17	3.319%	3.449%
Average		3.160%	3.469%

- This drama airs on a cable channel/pay TV which normally has a relatively smaller audience compared to free-to-air TV/public broadcasters (KBS, SBS, MBC and EBS).
