= Song Ji-hyo's Beauty View =

- Official Poster
- Also known as: Beauty View
- Genre: Talk-variety show
- Presented by: Song Ji-hyo; Gong Myung; Kim Mi Gu
- Country of origin: South Korea
- Original language: Korean
- No. of seasons: 1
- No. of episodes: 10

Production
- Executive producer: Lee Min Woo
- Running time: 60 minutes

Original release
- Network: JTBC2
- Release: January 19 – March 23, 2017

Related
- Song Ji-hyo's Beautiful Life

Song Ji-hyo's Beauty View (Korean: 송지효의 뷰티뷰), is a South Korean television program on JTBC2 hosted by Song Ji-hyo, Gong Myung and beauty editor Kim Mi Gu. The show provides a perfect beauty guide to match the personal preference. It used to air every Thursday at 9.20pm KST on JTBC2.

== Format ==
Ordinary people are invited as the makeup models on the show. The professional makeup artist uses her brushes and works wonders to show viewers about the fascinating beauty world.

== List of Episodes ==
Episode	Air date	Topic	Featured guest(s)
1	January 19	Rose makeup	Cha Eun-woo, Moon Bin (Astro)
2	January 26	Enhance your hidden features	Jung Chae-yeon, Ki Hui-hyeon (DIA)
3	February 2	Make your skin glow	Kim Jisook
4	February 9	Speed is necessary to be pretty	Lee Mi-joo, Jung Ye-in (Lovelyz)
5	February 16	The real tips of idol makeup	Cheng Xiao, Eunseo (Cosmic Girls)
6	February 23	Chemistry matters in skincare products	Hyojung, Jiho (Oh My Girl)
7	March 2	Men also need beauty care	Kim Him-chan, Yoo Young-jae (B.A.P)
8	March 9	T.P.O Makeup that's always necessary	Kang Ji-young, Jo Soo-ae
9	March 16	Makeup to match your age	Park Kyungri
10	March 23	Personal colors	Kyung Soo-jin
