= 708090 =

- Traditional Chinese: 708090之深圳戀歌
- Simplified Chinese: 708090之深圳恋歌
- Hanyu Pinyin: 708090 Zhī Shēnzhèn Liàngē
- Directed by: Lin Yiqi; Deng Jianquan; Chen Muchuan
- Written by: Wong Chun-chun
- Starring: Kenji Wu; Song Ji-hyo; Zhao Yihuan; Ray Lui; Irene Wan; Duo Liang; Li Fengming; Chen Rui; Lau Shek-yin
- Production companies: Mei Ah Movie Production; Shenzhen Tong Ying Funds; Shenzhen Meiah Culture Communication; Shenzhen Youmei Entertainment
- Distributed by: Beijing Huaxinbo Media
- Release date: 20 May 2016
- Running time: 90 minutes
- Country: China
- Language: Mandarin
- Box office: CN¥436,000

708090 is a 2016 Chinese romantic drama film directed by Lin Yiqi, Deng Jianquan and Chen Muchuan. It features Kenji Wu, Song Ji-hyo, Zhao Yihuan, Ray Lui, Irene Wan, Duo Liang, Li Fengming, Chen Rui and Lau Shek-yin. Production started in September 14, 2014 in Shenzhen and ended on October 20, 2014 in Phnom Penh. The film was released in China by Beijing Huaxinbo Media on May 20, 2016.

== Plot ==
A woman happily in love with her husband looks to find her own success in life as China undergoes economic and cultural changes.

== Cast ==
- Kenji Wu
- Song Ji-hyo as duan yu rong
- Zhao Yihuan as Lin Meiqing, a university student.
- Ray Lui as Feng Huaping
- Irene Wan as Zhao Yuanyuan
- Duo Liang
- Li Fengming
- Chen Rui as Qian Hai
- Lau Shek-yin
- Zhao Chenyan
- Li Donghan
- Shang Kan
- Jolie Fan

== Production ==
Filming took place in Shenzhen, Shangri-La and Phnom Penh.

== Reception ==
The film has grossed CN¥436,000 at the Chinese box office.
