= Lovely Horribly =

2018 South Korea television series

- Promotional poster
- Also known as: Lovely Horror-vely
- Hangul: 러블리 호러블리
- RR: Reobeulli horeobeulli
- MR: Rŏbŭlli horŏbŭlli
- Genre: Romantic comedy; Horror
- Created by: KBS Drama Production
- Written by: Park Min-joo
- Directed by: Kang Min-kyung
- Starring: Park Si-hoo; Song Ji-hyo; Lee Gi-kwang; Hahm Eun-jung; Choi Yeo-jin
- Country of origin: South Korea
- Original language: Korean
- No. of episodes: 32 (Note: In order to circumvent Korean laws that prevent commercial breaks in the middle of an episode, what would previously have been aired as single 70 minute episodes are now being repackaged as two 35 minute episodes, with two episodes being shown each night with a commercial break between the two.)

Production
- Executive producer: Moon Bo-mi
- Running time: 35 minutes
- Production companies: HB Entertainment; Lovely Horribly SPC; KBS Media

Original release
- Network: KBS2
- Release: August 13 – October 2, 2018

Lovely Horribly (Korean: 러블리 호러블리; RR: Reobeulli horeobeulli) is a South Korean television series starring Park Si-hoo and Song Ji-hyo with Lee Gi-kwang, Hahm Eun-jung and Choi Yeo-jin. It aired on KBS2 from August 13 to October 2, 2018, every Monday and Tuesday at 22:00 (KST).

== Synopsis ==
Philip (Park Si-hoo) and Eul-soon (Song Ji-hyo) are bound by an unusual fate: one's happiness always results in the other's misfortune. The two start writing a drama together, and the events in the screenplay mysteriously begin occurring in real life.

== Cast ==
=== Main ===
- Park Si-hoo as Yoo Philip/Yoo Eul-chook
  - Kim Tae-yool as child Yoo Philip

A top star who has extraordinary luck and is successful at everything he does.

- Song Ji-hyo as Oh Eul-soon
  - Shin Rin-ah as child Eul-soon

A prophetic screenwriter who is down on her luck.

- Lee Gi-kwang as Lee Sung-joong

A rookie production director who can see ghosts. He has a crush on Eul-soon.

- Hahm Eun-jung as Shin Yoon-ah

A popular actress who is Philip's girlfriend.

- Choi Yeo-jin as Ki Eun-young

A best-selling script writer who stole the work of her best friend Eul-soon. She hates Eul-soon as she is better than her when it comes to writing which created jealousy and hatred towards Eul-soon.

=== Supporting ===
==== People around Phillip ====
- Jang Hyuk-jin as Kang Tae-sik

CEO of Phillip's agency

- An Doo-ho as Kim Young-man

Manager of Phillip

- Hwang Sun-hee as Kim Ra-yun

Ex-girlfriend and fiancee of Phillip

- Jang Young-nam as Kim Ok-hee

Phillip's mother

- Sung Doo-sub as Seo Min-joon
- Jung Soon-won as Choong Yeol
- Lee Kyu-bok as Ki-soon
- Ji Seung-hyun as Sa Dong-cheol

Phillip's rival.

==== People around Eul-soon ====
- Moo Soo-bin as Park Soo-min

Eul-soon's assistant and friend.

- Jeon Bae-soo as Eul-soon's father
- Jung Jae-eun as Eul-soon's mother

==== Others ====
- Kim Young-woong as Detective Lee
- Ryu Tae-ho as Director Jo
- Kim Eung-soo as Fortune teller
- Kim Ji-eun as Lee Soo-jeong
- Song Young-hak
- Kang Suk-won
- Ji Soo
- Choi Hee-jin as Hee-jin

=== Special appearance ===
- Ha Dong-hoon as Eul-soon's ex-boyfriend
- Hong Seok-cheon as Kang Hyun-Seok
- Goo Jae-yee as fake ghost

== Production ==
The first script reading was held on June 2, 2018, at KBS Annex Broadcasting Station in Yeouido, Seoul.

== Original soundtrack ==
Lovely Horribly OST

Soundtrack album by Various artists
- Genre: Soundtrack
- Language: Korean
- Label: Forest Media/EL PARK/kakao M

=== OST Part 1 ===
Released on August 20, 2018
No.	Title	Lyrics	Music	Artist	Length
1.	"Who"	Kim Jin-ah	The Forest	Seunghee (Oh My Girl)	03:59
2.	"Who" (Inst.)		The Forest		03:59
Total length:					07:58

=== OST Part 2 ===
Released on August 28, 2018
No.	Title	Lyrics	Music	Artist	Length
1.	"Here I Am"	Kim Yoo-kyung	The Forest	Sandeul (B1A4)	04:10
2.	"Here I Am" (Inst.)		The Forest		04:10
Total length:					08:20

=== OST Part 3 ===
Released on September 4, 2018
No.	Title	Lyrics	Music	Artist	Length
1.	"Love One"	June	The Forest	Bumkey	04:00
2.	"Love One" (Inst.)		The Forest		04:00
Total length:					08:00

=== OST Part 4 ===
Released on September 11, 2018
No.	Title	Lyrics	Music	Artist	Length
1.	"So In Love"	Kim Yoo-kyung	The Forest	Eunha (GFriend)	04:02
2.	"So In Love" (Inst.)		The Forest		04:02
Total length:					08:04

=== OST Part 5 ===
Released on September 17, 2018
No.	Title	Lyrics	Music	Artist	Length
1.	"In Your Light"	Kim Yoo-kyung	The Forest	Lee Chang-sub (BtoB)	04:11
2.	"In Your Light" (Inst.)		The Forest		04:11
Total length:					08:22

=== OST Part 6 ===
Released on September 25, 2018
No.	Title	Lyrics	Music	Artist	Length
1.	"My All"	Kim Yoo-kyung	The Forest	Eun Ga-eun	04:23
2.	"My All" (Inst.)		The Forest		04:23
Total length:					08:46

== Ratings ==
- In this table, the blue numbers represent the lowest ratings and the red numbers represent the highest ratings.
- NR denotes that the drama did not rank in the top 20 daily programs on that date.

Ep.	Original broadcast date	Average audience share
Ep.	Original broadcast date	AGB Nielsen
Ep.	Original broadcast date	Nationwide
1	August 13, 2018	4.8% (27th)
2	August 13, 2018	5.0% (24th)
3	August 14, 2018	3.9% (27th)
4	August 14, 2018	4.5% (21st)
5	August 20, 2018	4.9% (21st)
6	August 20, 2018	5.3% (18th)
7	August 21, 2018	3.7% (28th)
8	August 21, 2018	4.6% (23rd)
9	August 27, 2018	5.4% (21st)
10	August 27, 2018	6.2% (17th)
11	August 28, 2018	4.0% (31st)
12	August 28, 2018	4.4% (27th)
13	September 3, 2018	4.2% (30th)
14	September 3, 2018	4.2% (30th)
15	September 4, 2018	3.9% (31st)
16	September 4, 2018	4.3% (27th)
17	September 10, 2018	3.4% (36th)
18	September 10, 2018	3.7% (15th)
19	September 11, 2018	4.4% (24th)
20	September 11, 2018	4.4% (24th)
21	September 17, 2018	2.4% (47th)
22	September 17, 2018	2.7% (41st)
23	September 18, 2018	2.6% (30th)
24	September 18, 2018	2.9% (29th)
25	September 24, 2018 (Note: Episode 25 is the lowest-rated episode of a KBS2 Monday-Tuesday 10:00 p.m. drama in history. Only Episode 23 of Welcome, which aired as a KBS2 Wednesday-Thursday 10:00 p.m. drama in 2020, registered a lower rating of 0.8%)	1.0% (NR)
26	September 24, 2018	2.2% (NR)
27	September 25, 2018	2.0% (NR)
28	September 25, 2018	3.2% (47th)
29	October 1, 2018	2.7% (45th)
30	October 1, 2018	2.8% (43rd)
31	October 2, 2018	2.9% (41st)
32	October 2, 2018	3.3% (35th)
Average		3.3%

== Awards and nominations ==
Award ceremony	Category	Nominee	Result	Ref.
2018 KBS Drama Awards	Excellence Award, Actor in a Mid-length Drama	Park Si-hoo	Nominated	
2018 KBS Drama Awards	Netizen Award Actor	Park Si-hoo	Nominated	
2018 KBS Drama Awards	Best Couple Award	Song Ji-hyo & Park Si-hoo	Nominated	
2018 KBS Drama Awards	Excellence Award, Actress in a Mid-length Drama	Song Ji-hyo	Nominated	
2018 KBS Drama Awards	Netizen Award, Actress	Song Ji-hyo	Nominated	
2018 KBS Drama Awards	Best New Actor	Lee Gi-kwang	Nominated	
2018 KBS Drama Awards	Best Young Actor	Kim Tae-yool	Nominated	
2018 KBS Drama Awards	Best Young Actress	Shin Rin-ah	Nominated	
Asia Artist Awards	Most Popular Actress	Song Ji-hyo	Won	

== International broadcast ==
- The drama is set to air in Japan on KNTV in January 2019.
- The drama is available in Viu and other online platforms.
