= Sohn Won-pyung =

South Korean writer and filmmaker (born 1979)

- 손원평
- Born: April 21, 1979 (age 47); Seoul, South Korea
- Education: Sogang University
- Occupations: Writer; director; screenwriter
- Parent: Sohn Hak-kyu (father)
- Writing career
- Notable work: Intruder

Korean name
- Hangul: 손원평
- Hanja: 孫元平
- RR: Son Wonpyeong
- MR: Son Wŏnp'yŏng

Sohn Won-pyung (Korean: 손원평; born 21 April, 1979, Seoul, South Korea) is a South Korean novelist and film maker. She has won two literary awards: in 2016 for Amondeu (아몬드 Almond) and in 2017 for Seoreunui bangyeok (서른의 반격 Counterattack of the Thirty). Sohn's novels explore the meaning of human existence and growth, and are characterized by the use of unique characters and rapid plot development.

== Biography ==
She was born in Seoul, South Korea in 1979 as the second daughter of Sohn Hak-kyu, a Korean politician. In college, she majored in both sociology and philosophy. Sohn believes that structured thinking skills she acquired from learning sociology and the concept of individuality she learned as a student of philosophy have been conducive to her novel writing. Notably, she has been actively engaged in both film making and novel writing.

== Films ==
Although Sohn had dreamed of becoming a professional novelist since she was in elementary school, her debut in the film industry preceded her literary debut. In 2001, she won a Film Criticism Award (영화평론상) from the film magazine Cine 21. Later she attended the Korean Academy of Film Arts (KAFA) and majored in film directing. After graduation, she directed a number of short films, winning several awards and critical acclaim for Inganjeogeuro jeongi an ganeun ingan (인간적으로 정이 안 가는 인간 Ooh, You Make Me Sick) (2005). Furthermore, she won a Best Scenario Synopsis Award (시나리오 시놉시스 부문상) at the 2006 SF Creative Writing Contest (과학기술 창작문예 공모전) for Sunganeul mideoyo (순간을 믿어요 I Believe in the Moment).

== Novels ==
Since her college years, she had repeatedly applied for numerous literary awards, using more than 30 pen names, but had not been successful. In 2013, she gave birth to a baby and began writing a small amount of words whenever she had time to spare. Sohn recalls that during this period she wrote much more than expected. It was during this period of her life that she had her belated literary debut as a novelist by winning a Changbi Prize for Young Adult Fiction (2016) for Almond. The translation rights for Almond were sold to 13 different language regions in 12 countries around the globe, an extremely rare case for a novice writer's work.

The following year, she won a Jeju 4.3 Peace Literary Prize (제주 4.3 평화문학상) for Seoreunui bangyeok. Sohn says that since the news of her first award-winning had given her ten years' worth of happiness, the news of her second award-winning did not excite her very much. As a novelist, she hopes to create a number of works. In particular, she is planning to write an epic novel depicting the history of four generations of daughters.

== Writing ==
Sohn Won-pyung's novels and scenarios pinpoint critical social issues. Such characteristic of her works is related to Sohn's unique way of creating literary and cinematic works, where she determines a subject matter first before creating characters suitable for the subject.

Almond

Almond (2016) is Sohn's debut novel and representative work. It was critically acclaimed as a great coming-of-age novel and an outstanding young adult fiction stylized in a uniquely Korean fashion. The lead character Yun-jae suffers from alexithymia, a subclinical inability to identify and describe emotions, as he has a relatively small amygdala, whose etymological meaning is "almond." On the other hand, his friend Goni is a boy who cannot control his emotions and bursts out his anger. Ironically, it was Yun-jae, the emotionally disabled boy who is unable to feel any fear, who gave solace to the emotionally hurt problem child Goni. Through a character who cannot feel any emotions and therefore is curious about the behavior of the other, the author stresses that true compassion requires special efforts.

Seoreunui bangyeok

Seoreunui bangyeok (2017) is a novel about the concerns and a sense of loss felt by younger generations who want to become proper adults. In the novel, the short sentence "The main character Kim Ji-hye was born in 1988" reminds us of the special meaning the year 1988 has in Korean society and of the common name "Ji-hye" that was popular at the time. The year 1988 was when the prolonged military dictatorship had finally come to an end and when the social expectations and hope for the realization of democracy ended up having a halfway success (or failure). Numerous "Ji-hyes" who were born at the time have now grown to become members of the so-called "880,000 Won Generation", and their only dream is to become "ordinary".

In the novel, Ji-hye, Gyu-ok, Mu-in and Nam-eun, all are friends of the same age, attempt their own counterattack against their unfair society. However, their revenge is mere practical jokes or acts of play, such as throwing a raw egg toward an immoral member of the National Assembly and sending a mocking letter to the rude General Manager Kim who is always farting and burping. Even though such pranks do not have the power to overthrow society, they can make a small crack in their unfair daily environment. In this way, instead of giving up and accepting their realities, they manifest their rejection of the irrationality through blithe acts of resistance that continue in small ways.

Saworui nun

Saworui nun (사월의 눈 April Snow) (2018) deals with the "moment of compassion" between someone who suffers and someone who tries to understand the suffering of the other. In this novel, a couple distressed by their baby's stillbirth meets Mari who belongs to a different nationality, race, and generation from this couple. The reason for Mari's own suffering is unknown, but she nevertheless deeply empathizes with them and gives consolation. Their conversation is a completely unexpected event—like a blizzard in April. However, without exception, it provides all those who are suffering with "lonesome yet affectionate solace."

== Works ==
《아몬드》, 창비, 2017 / Almond (Almond), Changbi, 2017

《서른의 반격》, 은행나무, 2017 / Seoreunui bangyeok (Counterattack of the Thirty), EunHaengNaMu, 2017

== Works in Translation ==
《4월의 눈》 k-픽션 21, 도서출판 아시아, 2018 / April Snow K-Fiction Series 21, ASIA, 2018

== Awards ==
Changbi Prize for Young Adult Fiction (2016) for Almond

Jeju 4.3 Peace Literary Prize (제주 4.3 평화문학상, 2016) for Seoreunui bangyeok
