= Gong Myung =

South Korean actor and singer

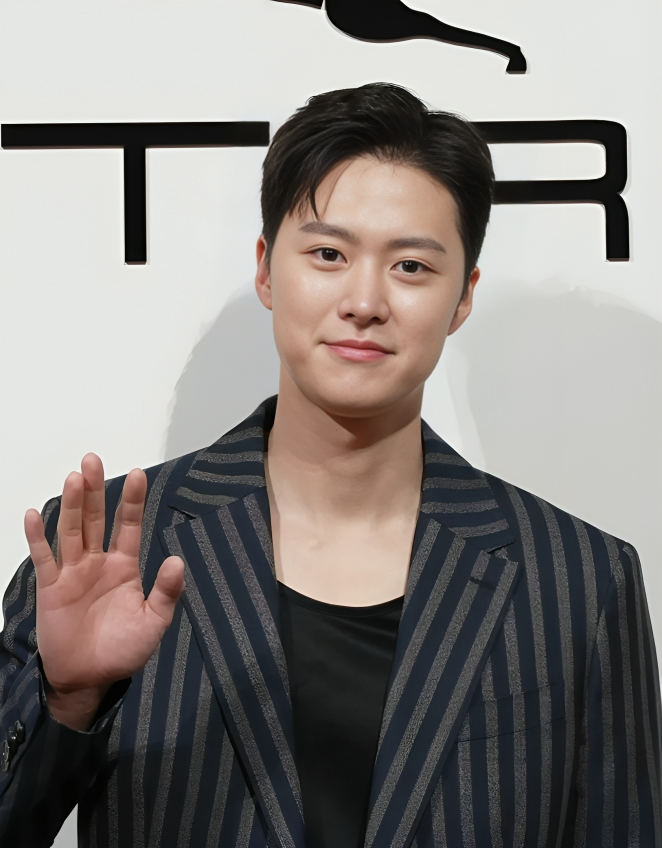
- Gong in August 2024
- Born: Kim Dong-hyun; Guri, South Korea
- Occupations: Actor; singer
- Years active: 2013–present
- Agent: BH Entertainment
- Relatives: Doyoung (brother)

Korean name
- Hangul: 김동현
- Hanja: 金東炫
- RR: Gim Donghyeon
- MR: Kim Tonghyŏn

Stage name
- Hangul: 공명
- Hanja: 孔明
- RR: Gong Myeong
- MR: Kong Myŏng

Kim Dong-hyun (Korean: 김동현), known professionally as Gong Myung (Korean: 공명), is a South Korean actor. He is a member of 5urprise. He is known for his roles in the television series Be Melodramatic (2019), and Lovers of the Red Sky (2021), as well as the film Extreme Job (2019).

== Career ==
In 2013, Gong made his acting debut in the web series After School: Lucky or Not together with the members of 5urprise – actor group formed by talent agency Fantagio. He then played supporting roles in MBC historical drama Splendid Politics (2015), SBS romance–comedy drama Entertainer (2017) and tvN romance–comedy series Drinking Solo (2016). Later in 2016, he joined the MBC reality show We Got Married where he was paired with actress Jung Hye-sung.

In 2017, Gong played the leading role in the two-episode drama The Happy Loner which aired on KBS2. The same year he played Bi-ryeom: God of the Land of the Sky in the fantasy–romance drama The Bride of Habaek and played Kwon Jae-hoon in tvN drama Revolutionary Love.

In 2019, he starred in the action comedy film Extreme Job as Jae-hoon – youngest member of a team of detectives. The film became a major box office success in South Korea, surpassing 10 million ticket sales in just 15 days. It is currently the third most viewed film in South Korean film history. For his role, he received six nominations for Best New Actor at multiple awards ceremonies – winning 2 of them. Later that year, he appeared in historical film Homme Fatale and JTBC TV series Be Melodramatic.

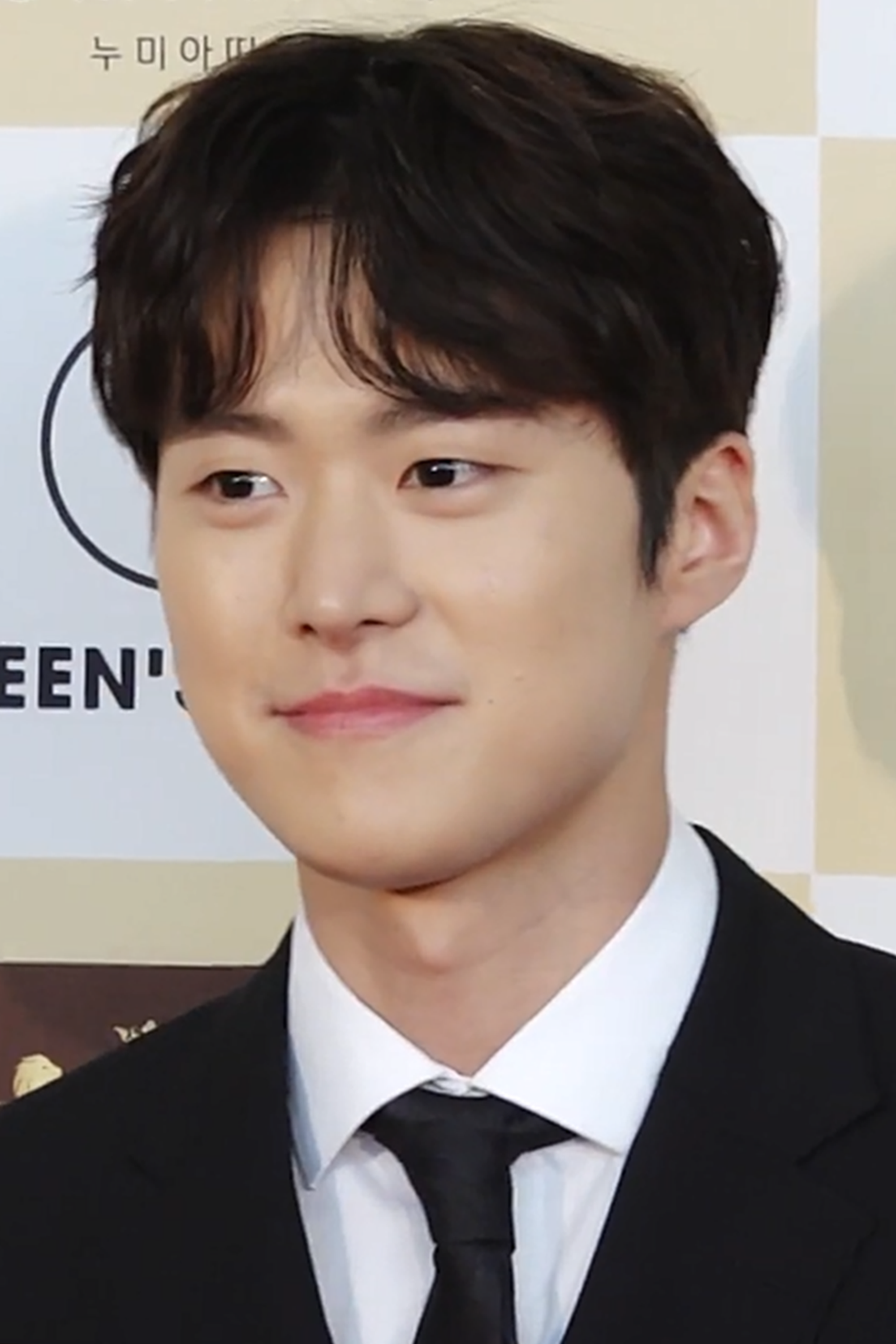
Gong in July 2019

In April 2020, Gong signed with new management agency Saram Entertainment, after his contract with previous management company expired.

In 2021, Gong starred in the historical-fantasy drama Lovers of the Red Sky which aired on SBS. He played the role of Grand Prince Yangmyeong – a leisurely prince who is an expert at painting, calligraphy and poetry. Later the same year, he became a cast member of the third season of tvN travel variety show House on Wheels.

In 2022, Gong appeared as commander Yi Eokgi in the Kim Han-min's war action film Hansan: Rising Dragon.

In 2025, he played the main character Way Back Love in TVing.

In October 2026, Gong signed an exclusive contract with BH Entertainment.

== Personal life ==
He has a younger brother, Doyoung (real name Kim Dong-young), who is a member of the boy group NCT.

=== Military service ===
On November 5, 2021, it was reported that Gong had received a summons for mandatory military service.

He enlisted in the military on December 14, 2021, without revealing the location to prevent the spread of COVID-19. He was discharged on June 13, 2023.

== Filmography ==
=== Film ===
Year	Title	Role	Notes	Ref.
2013	If You Were Me 6	Seon-jae		
2013	Ice River	Seon-jae	Short film	
2014	Futureless Things	Ki-cheol		
2014	A Girl at My Door	Police Officer Kwon Son-oh		
2016	Su Saek	Sang-woo		
2019	Extreme Job	Detective Jae-hoon		
2019	Homme Fatale	Yoo Sang		
2022	Hansan: Rising Dragon	Yi Eokgi		
2022	20th Century Girl	Jung Woon-ho	Cameo	
2023	Killing Romance	Kim Bum-woo		
2024	Citizen of a Kind	Jae-min		
2025	Love Untangled	Han Yoon-seok		
2026	Wild Sing	Hyun-woo's junior	Cameo	
2026	Husbands in Action	Lee Min-seok		

=== Television series ===
Year	Title	Role	Notes	Ref.
2014	Bomi's Room	Gong Myung	Cameo	
2015	Splendid Politics	Ja Gyung		
2015–2016	Beautiful You	Cha Tae-woo		
2016	Mystery Freshman	Lee Min-sung	Drama Special	
2016	Entertainer	Kyle / Lee Bang-geul		
2016	Drinking Solo	Jin Gong-myung		
2017	The Happy Loner	Byeok-soo	One-act drama	
2017	The Bride of Habaek	Bi-ryum		
2017	Revolutionary Love	Kwon Je-hoon		
2018	Feel Good to Die	Kang Jun-ho		
2019	Be Melodramatic	Chu Jae-hoon		
2020	Recipe for Happiness	Namgoong Jin-soo	One-act drama	
2021	Lovers of the Red Sky	Prince Yangmyeong (Yi Yul)		
2025	Second Shot at Love	Seo Eui-joon		
2026	Filing for Love	Noh Ki-jun		

=== Web series ===
Year	Title	Role	Notes	Ref.
2013	After School: Lucky or Not	Gong Myung		
2013	Infinite Power	Han Soo-dong		
2018	Brain, Your Choice Of Romance	L		
2025	Way Back Love	Kim Ram-woo		
2025	Mercy for None	Gu Jun-mo		
2026	Bloodhounds	Dong-hyun	Season 2; Cameo	

=== Television shows ===
Year	Title	Role	Notes	Ref.
2016–2017	We Got Married Season 4	Cast Member	paired with Jung Hye-sung	
2017	Law of the Jungle: Kota Manado	Cast Member		
2017	Song Ji-hyo's Beauty View	Host	with Song Ji-hyo	
2021	House on Wheels 3	Cast Member	with Sung Dong-il and Kim Hee-won	

=== Hosting ===
Year	Title	Notes	Ref.
2022	2022 Gyeryong World Military Culture Expo	Part: K-Military Contest; October 15	
2024	Closing Ceremony of the 29th Busan International Film Festival	with Choi Soo-young	

=== Music video appearances ===
Year	Song Title	Artist	Ref.
2020	"Winter Breath"	10cm	
2021	"Moving On"	Kyuhyun	
2021	"Coffee"	Kyuhyun	
2021	"Together"	Kyuhyun	
2022	"Love Story"	Kyuhyun	

== Accolades ==
=== Awards and nominations ===
Name of the award ceremony, year presented, category, nominee of the award, and the result of the nomination
Award ceremony	Year	Category	Nominee / Work	Result	Ref.
Asia Artist Awards	2016	Rookie of the Year Award	Drinking Solo	Nominated	
Asia Culture and Economy Grand Awards	2017	Special Acting Award	Gong Myung	Won	
Baeksang Arts Awards	2017	Best New Actor – Television	Drinking Solo	Nominated	
Baeksang Arts Awards	2019	Best New Actor – Film	Extreme Job	Nominated	
Blue Dragon Film Awards	2019	Best New Actor	Extreme Job	Nominated	
Buil Film Awards	2019	Best New Actor	Extreme Job	Nominated	
Buil Film Awards	2019	Male Popularity Award	Extreme Job	Nominated	
Busan International Film Festival with Marie Claire Asia Star Awards	2023	Face of Asia Award	Killing Romance	Won	
Chunsa Film Art Awards	2019	Best New Actor	Extreme Job	Won	
Grand Bell Awards	2020	Best New Actor	Extreme Job	Nominated	
KBS Drama Awards	2017	Best Actor in a One-Act/Special/Short Drama	The Happy Loner	Nominated	
Korea Best Star Awards	2019	Best New Actor	Extreme Job	Won	
Korea First Brand Award	2022	Rising Star Actor	Gong Myung	Won	
Korea First Brand Award	2022	Male Multi-Entertainer	Gong Myung	Won	
Korea Youth Film Festival	2019	Best New Actor	Extreme Job, Homme Fatale	Won	
Korea Youth Film Festival	2019	Most Popular Film Award	Extreme Job, Homme Fatale	Won	
SBS Drama Awards	2021	Excellence Award for an Actor in a Mini-Series Genre/Fantasy Drama	Lovers of the Red Sky	Nominated	

=== Listicles ===
Name of publisher, year listed, name of listicle, and placement
Publisher	Year	Listicle	Placement	Ref.
The Screen	2019	2009–2019 Top Box Office Powerhouse Actors in Korean Movies	47th	
Korean Film Council	2021	Korean Actors 200 (Note: Introduces 200 actors that best represent the present and future of Korean cinema to the people in the film industry all over the world.)	Included	
