= How to Meet a Perfect Neighbor =

2007 South Korean television series

- Promotional poster
- Also known as: The Perfect Neighbor
- Genre: Romance, Comedy, Drama
- Written by: Jung Ji-woo
- Directed by: Jo Nam-kook
- Starring: Kim Seung-woo; Bae Doona; Park Si-hoo; Wang Ji-hye
- Country of origin: South Korea
- Original language: Korean
- No. of episodes: 20

Production
- Producer: Huh Woong
- Production locations: South Korea, Cambodia
- Running time: Wednesdays and Thursdays at 21:55 (KST)
- Production company: Hobak Dungkul (Pumpkin Vine)

Original release
- Network: Seoul Broadcasting System
- Release: 25 July – 27 September 2007

How to Meet a Perfect Neighbor (Korean: 완벽한 이웃을 만나는 법; RR: Wanbyeokhan iuseul mannaneun beop) is a 2007 South Korean television series starring Kim Seung-woo, Bae Doona, Park Si-hoo, Wang Ji-hye, Son Hyun-joo and Kim Sung-ryung. It aired on SBS from July 25 to September 27, 2007 on Wednesdays and Thursdays at 21:55 for 20 episodes.

The romantic comedy series was partially filmed in Cambodia, the first time for a Korean drama to be shot in that country.

== Plot ==
Baek Soo-chan is a playboy infamous for manipulating women. After meeting Jung Yoon-hee and her older sister Mi-hee on vacation, he puts the moves on them as usual, but Yoon-hee sees right through him, and tries to keep him away from her naive sister. Fate draws them together again, however, when back in Korea, Soo-chan ends up living next door. Meanwhile, Yoon-hee begins working as secretary to Yoo Joon-seok, the new president of her company. Forced to come back and take over their family business when his father suddenly collapsed, Joon-seok shoulders the burdens of corporate responsibilities and of trying to please a father who has never shown him any affection. At first the perfectionist Joon-seok clashes with his quirky secretary, then gradually begins to fall for her. But Joon-seok's arranged marriage to Go Hye-mi, an heiress, is already being planned.

== Cast ==
=== Main characters ===
- Kim Seung-woo as Baek Soo-chan
  - Lee Ji-oh as young Baek Soo-chan
- Bae Doona as Jung Yoon-hee
- Park Si-hoo as Yoo Joon-seok
- Wang Ji-hye as Go Hye-mi
- Son Hyun-joo as Yang Deok-gil
- Shin Dong-woo as Yang Go-ni, Deok-gil's adopted son
- Kim Sung-ryung as Jung Mi-hee, Yoon-hee's older sister
- Ahn Sun-young as Oh Jung-sook
- Park Kwang-jung as Mr. Park
- Jung Eun-pyo as Mr. Choi

=== Supporting characters ===
- Park Won-sook as Sun-woo, Yoon-hee and Mi-hee's mother
- Jung Dong-hwan as Go Chang-shik, Hye-mi's father
- Seo Kwon-soon as Song Young-ja, Hye-mi's mother
- Kim Roi-ha as Detective Kang Yeok-gae
- Kim Sung-tae as Detective Kim
- Kwon Tae-won as Chief detective
- Lee Won-jae as Byun Hee-sub
- Kim Sun-hwa as Choi Bo-kyung, Hee-sub's wife
- Han Ye-in as Byun Seon
- Lee Byung-hyun as Byun Young
- Kim Jung-hak as Cha Young-jae, J Corporation executive
- Park Kwang-soo as Wee Dae-han, Jung-sook's husband
- Kim Gil-ho as Yoo Man-ho, Joon-seok's father
- Kim Seok-ok as Han Ok-geum, Joon-seok's mother
- Park Yeon-ah as Ahn Ye-seul, Mi-hee's daughter
- Cha Seo-won as Lei Kim
- Kim Young-jin as Mina, Joon-seok's other secretary
- Jang Hye-sook as Yeon Soo-yeon, Go-mi's mother
- Kim Dong-gyun as Kim Dae-shik
- Jo Han-na as Na Ha-ni
- Kim Ye-ryeong as Dan Myung-hee
- Kim Sa-rang
- Pov Theavy (credited as Ka Cho)

== Awards and nominations ==
Year	Award	Category	Recipient	Result
2007	SBS Drama Awards	Top Excellence Award, Actor	Kim Seung-woo	Nominated
2007	SBS Drama Awards	Excellence Award, Actress in a Miniseries	Bae Doona	Nominated
2007	SBS Drama Awards	Best Supporting Actor in a Miniseries	Son Hyun-joo	Nominated
2007	SBS Drama Awards	New Star Award	Park Si-hoo	Won
2007	SBS Drama Awards	Best Young Actor	Shin Dong-woo	Nominated

== International broadcast ==
It aired in Japan on cable channel KNTV from October 11 to December 14, 2010.
