= Tae Hang-ho =

South Korean actor

- Born: July 22, 1983 (age 43); South Korea
- Occupation: Actor
- Years active: 2009–present
- Agent: Mystic Story
- Spouse: Unknown (m. 2019)
- Children: 1

Korean name
- Hangul: 태항호
- Hanja: 太亢鎬
- RR: Tae Hangho
- MR: T'ae Hangho
- Website: mystic89.net/artist/hang_ho_tae

Tae Hang-ho (Korean: 태항호; born July 22, 1983) is a South Korean actor known for his work in film, television, musicals, and theater. He started his career in a theater company in 2008 and made his debut in 2009 with a theater play. Tae gained recognition for his performances in various dramas such as It's Okay, That's Love (2014), Legendary Witches (2014), Pinocchio (2014), All About My Mom (2015), The Last Empress (2018) and Zombie Detective (2020).

== Personal life ==
Tae Hang-ho married his non-celebrity girlfriend, six years his junior, on October 5, 2019. The couple had been together for three years. They have a daughter in 2021.

== Filmography ==
=== Film ===
Feature film appearances
Year	Title	Role	Ref.
2012	Code Name: Jackal	Detective Seongju 2	
2013	Man on the Edge	faction boss subordinate	
2013	My Paparotti	Karaoke Gangster 1	
2015	Apostle		
2018	Psychokinesis	Civil book burden	
2018	Human, Space, Time and Human	gangster 3	
2020	Innocence	Yang Wang Yong	
2021	There's an alien in here	Tae Ha-myung	
2021	Pipeline	Geun-sab	
2022	Howch	Kang-ho	
2023	The Bus	Kang-ho	
2025	Choir of God	Kim Seong-cheol	

=== Television series ===
Television series appearances
Year	Title	Role	Notes	Ref.
2011	Poseidon			
2012	Those Who Can, Ask			
2012	Ohlala Couple	Towel man		
2013	KBS Drama Special: "The Memory in My Old Wallet"	Stepfather		
2013	Drama Festival: "Boy Meets Girl"	Jong-won		
2013	Reply 1994	Pre-medical senior		
2014	Miss Korea	Scamp		
2014	Angel's Revenge	Pray		
2014	Shining Romance	Assistant		
2014	Inspiring Generation	Mun-bok		
2014	The Story of Kang-goo	Hong-gi		
2014	It's Okay, That's Love	Yang Tae-yong		
2014	4 Legendary Witches	President Kim Man-soo		
2014	Pinocchio	Chow Chul		
2015	Hidden Identity	Seung-gyun		
2015	Oh My Ghost	Yoon Cheol-min		
2015	High-End Crush	Beast man	Web drama	
2015	All About My Mom	Park Gye-tae		
2015	Six Flying Dragons	Envoy of Yuan dynasty		
2015	Win Tomorrow Too	Kang Min-cheol		
2016	My Little Baby	Seo Jang-hoon		
2016	Dantara			
2016	Uncontrollably Fond			
2016	Love in the Moonlight	Do-gi	A eunuch	
2017	Missing 9	Taihu Port		
2017	Bingu	Street vendor	Special appearance	
2017	Live Up to Your Name	Militia		
2017	Man in the Kitchen	Noh Ji-sim		
2018	Drama Stage: "My House is Delicious, Soybean Paste is Delicious"			
2018	Tempted	Father Mateo		
2018	Wok of Love	Im Geok-jeong		
2018	The Last Empress	Na Wang-sik / Chun Woo-bin	Special appearance (Ep. 1–6)	
2019	Voice 3	Jeon Chang-soo		
2019	KBS Drama Special: "Some Kid Saw It"	Sunho		
2020	Zombie Detective	Lee Sung-rok		
2021	Taxi Driver	Park Joo-chan		
2021	The Penthouse: War in Life 3	Judge	Special appearance	
2021	The King of Tears, Lee Bang-won	Yi Hwa-sang	Yi Ji-ran's eldest son	
2022	Love in Contract	Choi Sang-hyuk	Special appearance	
2023	The Escape of the Seven	Go Myeong-ji, adulterous man	Special appearance	
2023	A Bloody Lucky Day	Yang Seung-taek		
2024	Crash	Kang Chang-seok		
2024	Dog Knows Everything	Yook Dung-joo		

== Stage ==
=== Musical ===
Musical play performance
Year	Title		Role	Theater	Date	Ref.
Year	English	Korean	Role	Theater	Date	Ref.
2023	Dream High	드림하이	Ma Doo-sik	Gwanglim Art Centre BBCH Hall	May 13 to July 23	

=== Theater ===
Theater play performance
Year	Title		Role	Theater	Date	Ref.
Year	English	Korean	Role	Theater	Date	Ref.
2009–2015	Room Number 13	룸넘버13	Richard	Daehangno Human Theater (former Theaterga)	January 1, 2009 – December 31, 2015	
2009	Hamlet Q1	햄릿Q1	Cornelius	Dongduk Women's University Performing Arts Center	March 20, 2009 – March 29, 2009	
2010–2011	I Miss You	보고싶습니다	Hurraeng-i	Bada Theater	November 13, 2010 – August 28, 2011	
2011	Your Meaning	너의 의미	Man	Daehangno Guerrilla Theater	January 22, 2011 – January 30, 2011	
2012–2014	Comedy No. 1	코미디 넘버원	Deu	KONTENTZ BOX	March 1, 2012 – March 23, 2014	
2012	Comedy No. 1	코미디 넘버원	Deu	Songjuk Theater	April 27, 2012 – May 28, 2012	
2012	She Is Too Violent for Me	내겐 너무 살벌한 그녀	Chaesik	Mimaze Art Center Mulbit Theater	July 19, 2012 – October 7, 2012	
2012–2013	The Unruly Ones	막무가내들	Jangpillyeon	Lemon Art Hall (former Arts Play Theater 2)	November 12, 2012 – June 2, 2013	
2013	Shall We Get Married?	우리결혼할까요	Swaggerer	JTN Art Hall 4	March 29, 2013 – June 2, 2013	
2013	Chekhovian Imagination - The Seagull Act 5 Scene 1	체홉적 상상 - 갈매기 5막 1장	Medvedenko	Catholic Youth Center Theater (former CY Theater)	October 16, 2013 – October 19, 2013	
2014	Youth! Explosion Junjeon	청춘일발장전	Jongman	Daehangno Starcity Casino Hall (former Tiny Alice)	July 12, 2014 – September 28, 2014	
2015–2016	The Story of a Neulgeun Thief	늘근도둑 이야기	Less Hardened Thief	COEX Art Hall	April 8, 2015 – March 6, 2016	
2015	1950 Wedding Anniversary	1950 결혼기념일	Soldier's Brother	Bricks Theater (former Contents Ground)	June 25, 2015 – June 28, 2015	
2015–2017	The Story of a Hardened Thief	늘근도둑 이야기	Less Hardened Thief	Uniplex 3	November 26, 2015 – March 5, 2017	
2016	The Story of a Hardened Thief	늘근도둑 이야기	Less Hardened Thief	Daegu Bongsan Cultural Center Main Theater (Gaon Hall)	March 10, 2016 – March 20, 2016	
2016	The Story of a Hardened Thief	늘근도둑 이야기	Less Hardened Thief	Busan Cinema Center Sky Theater	May 13, 2016 – May 15, 2016	
2016	Minjo	민초	Soldier	Naon Theater	June 29, 2016 – July 3, 2016	
2017–2022	The Story of a Hardened Thief	늘근도둑 이야기	Less Hardened Thief	Uniplex 3	November 10, 2017 – February 28, 2022	
2019	World Friends	세상친구	Deoksu	Miari-gogae Arts Theater	March 1, 2019 – March 17, 2019	
2021	A Streetcar Named Desire	욕망이라는 이름의 전차	Mitch	Hongik University Daehangno Art Center Main Theater	October 8, 2021 – November 21, 2021	
2022	Linda and Joy	린다와 조이	Joy	Huam Theater in Daehakro	August 24 to September 18	
2022–2024	The Story of a Hardened Thief	늘근도둑 이야기	Less Hardened Thief	Art Forest Art Hall 1	March 5, 2022 – April 30, 2024	
2023	When the Cherry Blossoms Fall	벚꽃이 떨어질 때	Yang Bong-du	Naru Arts Center in Gwangjin District	March 9	
2024	Friends of the World	세상친구		Mapo Art Center in Mapo District	July 5 to August 11	
2024	Angels in America	엔젤스인 아메리카	Belize	LG Signature Hall at LG Arts Center	August 6 to September 28	

== Awards and nominations ==
Name of the award ceremony, year presented, category, nominee of the award, and the result of the nomination
Award ceremony	Year	Category	Nominee / Work	Result	Ref.
KBS Entertainment Awards	2020	Best Challenge Award	Zombie Detective	Won	
Korea Drama Awards	2019	Best Actor single-act drama	What kind of child saw it?	Nominated	
