= The Bride of Habaek =

2017 South Korean TV series

- Promotional Poster
- Also known as: Bride of the Water God
- Hangul: 하백의 신부
- Lit.: Bride of Habaek 2017
- RR: Habaegui sinbu
- MR: Habaegŭi sinbu
- Genre: Fantasy; Romance; Comedy
- Based on: Bride of the Water God by Yoon Mi-kyung
- Developed by: Studio Dragon
- Written by: Jung Yoon-jung
- Directed by: Kim Byung-soo
- Creative directors: Kwon Young-il; Lee Seung-kyoo; Choi Kwang-shik; Lee So-jin
- Starring: Nam Joo-hyuk; Shin Se-kyung; Lim Ju-hwan; Krystal Jung; Gong Myung
- Country of origin: South Korea
- Original language: Korean
- No. of episodes: 16

Production
- Executive producers: Kim Mi-na; Lee Chan-ho
- Producers: Kim Ye-ji; Seo Jae-hyun
- Cinematography: Jun Byung-moon; Uhm Jae-wan
- Editors: Hong Hyo-Sun; Choi Yun-joo
- Camera setup: Single-camera
- Production company: Number Three Pictures

Original release
- Network: tvN
- Release: July 3 – August 22, 2017

The Bride of Habaek (Korean: 하백의 신부 2017; RR: Habaegui sinbu 2017) is a South Korean television drama spin-off of the 2006 sunjung manhwa Bride of the Water God by Yoon Mi-kyung. The series stars Shin Se-kyung in the title role alongside Nam Joo-hyuk, Lim Ju-hwan, Krystal Jung and Gong Myung. The series aired on cable channel tvN every Monday and Tuesday at 22:55 (KST) from July 3, 2017 to August 22, 2017.

== Synopsis ==
When the god of the Land of Water, Lord Ha-baek (Nam Joo-hyuk) visits Earth to retrieve the sacred stones required for him to claim the throne of the Divine Realm, he seeks the help of neuropsychiatrist So-ah (Shin Se-Kyung), the only remaining descendant from a middle-class family fated to serve him for generations. Because she does not believe that Ha-baek is a god and mistakes him for suffering from a mental illness, she initially resists him. However, after she meets the god of the Land of the Sky, Bi-ryeom (Gong Myung), the goddess of the Land of Water, Mu-ra (Krystal), and the demigod Hu-ye (Lim Ju-hwan), she decides to aid him in his quest.

== Cast ==
=== Main ===
- Shin Se-kyung as Yoon So-ah

A neuropsychiatrist with her own practice, who is currently struggling and swamped with debt. She is an only child with a tormented past, due to her belief that she was abandoned by her father as a teenager, resulting in her suicide attempt by jumping into the Han River. Although she was saved from drowning, she ends up developing hydrophobia, especially for cold water. She meets Ha-baek upon his arrival to earth and, while helping him adjust to the human world and retrieve the sacred stones, falls in love with him. Unknowingly to them both, she is destined to be his bride.

- Nam Joo-hyuk as Ha-baek

The god of the Land of Water and the rightful heir to the throne of the Realm of the Gods. He comes to earth, specifically modern-day Seoul, with the aim of obtaining the sacred stones. At the request of the high priest and upon temporarily losing his powers, he seeks out So-ah's help as the last remaining descendant of the family destined to serve him. During their quest he finds himself falling for her but struggles with his feelings due to his impending return to the Water Kingdom. His love for So-ah is criticized by those from the Divine Realm since he's been in love previously with a human woman but their relationship ended tragically because of her betrayal.

- Lim Ju-hwan as Shin Hoo-ye
  - Yoon Chan-young as young Hoo-ye.

A demi-god disguised as the CEO of a resort and Ha-baek's main rival. His birth parents are relatively unknown, apart from his mother being a human woman and his father a god from the Divine Realm. Because of his nature, he was abandoned as a child and is seen as a disgrace to the Realm of the Gods. His curse is subjection to an endless, mortal life on earth and deathly powers. Although they start off on the wrong foot, he eventually forms a friendship with So-ah and falls in love with her.

- Jung Soo-jung as Moo-ra / Hye-ra

The goddess of the Land of Water who has lived among humans for hundreds of years as a well-known actress. She initially has an unrequited love for Ha-baek and despises So-ah because of their relationship, but eventually develops feelings for Bi-ryeom.

- Gong Myung as Bi-ryum / Ahn-bin

The god of the Land of the Sky and a familiar face from So-ah's past. He hates Hu-ye unbeknownst to those from the Divine Realm, including Ha-baek and Mu-ra, because he was responsible for the murder of a close friend when he was a child. He initially has an unrequited love for Mu-ra, but it is reciprocated by her as the series progresses and they spend more time together.

=== Supporting ===
==== Divine Realm ====
- Lee Geung-young as the high priest
- Park Kyu-seon as Nam Soo-ri, Ha-baek's servant
- Lee Dal-hyung as Joo Kul-rin, the greedy god
- Kim Tae-hwan as Jin Kun

==== Human world ====
- Shin Jae-hoon as Yoo Sang-yoo
- Choi Woo-ri as Jo Yeon-mi
- Jung Dong-hwan as Chairman Shin Dong-man
- Bae Noo-ri as Shin Ja-ya, granddaughter of Shin Dong-man
- Song Won-geun as Secretary Min

=== Extended ===
- Lee Ji-ha as So-ah's mother
- Son Hyo-eun
- Kwon Hyeok-soo
- Jung In-tae
- Jung Na-jin
- Lee Joon-hee
- Lee Kwang-se
- Kim Soo-bin
- Lim I-eun
- Shim Tae-seon
- Ji Sung-geun
- Kim Mi-hye
- Kang Moon-kyung
- Park Yong-jin
- Kim Bo-min as Min-i
- Kim Ki-moo as manager Bang
- Im Ji-Hyun as Nak Bin, Ha-baek first love
- Park Mi-na
- Kang Jung-ho
- Kim Sung-mo
- Jung Ae-hee
- Ham Kun-soo
- Han Tae-il
- Seo Jung-chun
- Nam Eun-ji
- Kim Eun-kyung
- Choi Ji-won
- Kim Kwang-hyun
- Jung Chan-in
- Baek Seung-joon
- Seol Ka-eun
- Jung Seo-woo
- Jung Na-yong
- Song Ji-woo
- Kim Ae-rin
- Lee Jae-baek
- Son Kyu-won
- Han Sung-yong as Hye-ra's manager
- Son Woo-hyuk

=== Special appearances ===
- Park Hee-von as Hyung Sik, Sang Yu's fiancée (Ep. 16)
- Yang Dong-geun as Joo-Dong, an earth god (Ep. 9, 10 & 16)
- Jo Jung-chi as painter (Ep. 1)
- Yoon Jong-hoon as Ma Bong-yeol (Ep. 1–2)
- Ga Deuk-hee as Bank employee (Ep. 1)
- Kim Won-hae as Taxi driver (Ep. 7)
- Nam Chang-hee as Skateboard tournament host (Ep. 2)
- Jeon So-min as patient (Ep. 4)

== Production ==
=== Development ===
First announced in 2015, the live action version of the manhwa was written by Jung Yoon-jung, writer of the dramas Arang and the Magistrate (2012), Monstar (2013) and Misaeng (2014). The series relocates the characters and story to modern-day Seoul. The first script reading took place on March 16, 2017 in Sangam-dong, Seoul, South Korea, with principal photography beginning the same month.

=== Original soundtrack ===
Part 1

No.	Title	Lyrics	Music	Artist	Length
1.	"The Reason Why" (이렇게 좋은 이유)	Nam Hye-seung; Park Jin-ho	POLY	Yang Da-il	04:09
2.	"The Reason Why" (Inst.)		POLY		04:09
Total length:					08:18

Part 2

No.	Title	Lyrics	Music	Artist	Length
1.	"Glass Bridge"	Nam Hye-seung; MIYO; JELLO ANN	Nam Hye-seung; MIYO	Savina & Drones	04:27
2.	"Glass Bridge" (Inst.)		Nam Hye-seung; MIYO		04:27
Total length:					08:54

Part 3

No.	Title	Artist	Length
1.	"The Day I Dream"	Kassy	03:17
2.	"The Day I Dream" (Inst.)		03:17
Total length:			06:34

Part 4

No.	Title	Artist	Length
1.	"Pop Pop"	Kim E-Z (Ggotjam Project)	03:31
2.	"Pop Pop" (Inst.)		03:31
Total length:			07:02

Part 5

No.	Title	Artist	Length
1.	"생각이 납니다(Reminds Me Of)"	Junggigo (정기고)	04:07
2.	"생각이 납니다(Reminds Me Of)" (Inst.)		04:07
Total length:			08:14

Part 6

No.	Title	Artist	Length
1.	"니가 없는 날(Without You)"	Lucia (심규선)	04:00
2.	"니가 없는 날(Without You)" (Inst.)		04:00
Total length:			08:00

== Ratings ==
In this table, the blue numbers represent the lowest ratings and the red numbers represent the highest ratings.

Ep.	Original broadcast date	Average audience share		
Ep.	Original broadcast date	AGB Nielsen		TNmS
Ep.	Original broadcast date	Nationwide	Seoul	Nationwide
1	July 3, 2017	3.660%	4.052%	3.2%
2	July 4, 2017	3.259%	3.875%	3.1%
3	July 10, 2017	2.923%	3.173%	3.2%
4	July 11, 2017	3.467%	3.617%	3.3%
5	July 17, 2017	3.106%	3.902%	3.1%
6	July 18, 2017	3.637%	4.047%	3.5%
7	July 24, 2017	2.860%	3.574%	2.8%
8	July 25, 2017	3.474%	3.848%	3.1%
9	July 31, 2017	3.091%	3.146%	2.8%
10	August 1, 2017	3.235%	3.584%	3.1%
11	August 7, 2017	2.682%	2.761%	2.6%
12	August 8, 2017	3.501%	3.722%	2.8%
13	August 14, 2017	2.635%	2.816%	2.8%
14	August 15, 2017	2.896%	3.170%	2.8%
15	August 21, 2017	2.211%	2.446%	2.3%
16	August 22, 2017	3.158%	3.888%	3.1%
Average		3.112%	3.476%	3.0%
