= Song Ji-hyo =

South Korean actress (born 1981)

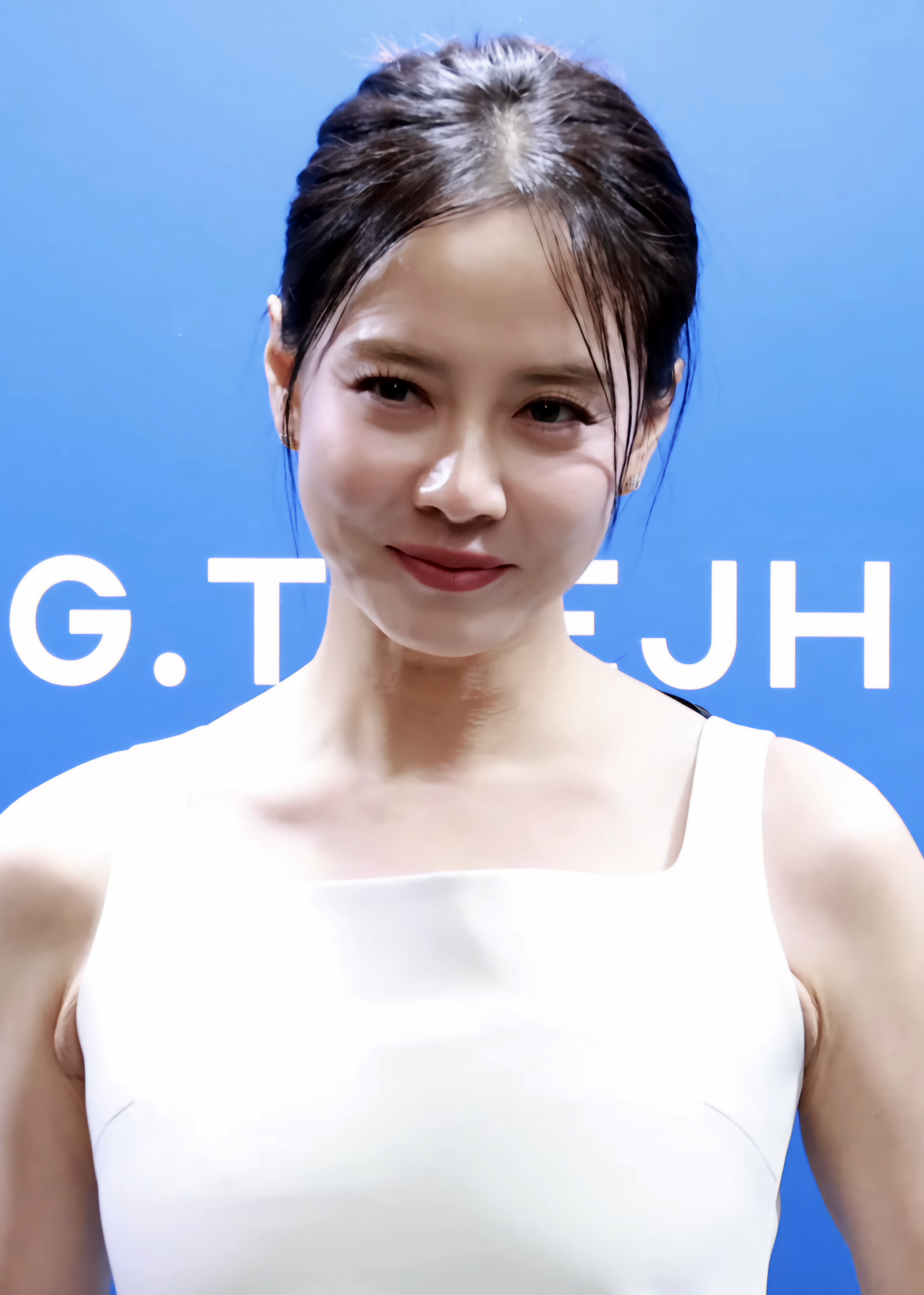
- Song in 2024
- Born: Cheon Seong-im; August 15, 1981 (age 45); Pohang, South Korea
- Education: Kookje University
- Occupations: Actress; model
- Years active: 2001–present
- Agent(s): Nexus E&M

Korean name
- Hangul: 천수연
- RR: Cheon Suyeon
- MR: Ch'ŏn Suyŏn

Stage name
- Hangul: 송지효
- RR: Song Jihyo
- MR: Song Chihyo

Former name
- Hangul: 천성임
- RR: Cheon Seongim
- MR: Ch'ŏn Sŏngim

Signature
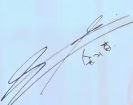

Cheon Soo-yeon (Korean: 천수연; born Cheon Seong-im, August 15, 1981), better known by the stage name Song Ji-hyo (Korean: 송지효), is a South Korean actress and model. Song is one of the regular cast members of the South Korean variety show Running Man since 2010, which brought her international recognition. She was a cover model for Kiki Magazine before she made her acting debut in the feature film Wishing Stairs (2003), the third installment in the Whispering Corridors film series. She made her television debut in the romantic comedy Princess Hours (2006) and the historical Jumong (2006).

Song then received wider recognition for her roles in the film A Frozen Flower (2008), New World (2013), the TV series Emergency Couple (2014) and Was It Love? (2020), and her first-ever film released after the start of the pandemic COVID-19 since March 2020 in South Korea, Intruder (2020), which received a positive response from moviegoers even though it was released during the pandemic.

== Early life ==
Song Ji-hyo was born as Cheon Seong-im on August 15, 1981, in Pohang, South Korea. Her mother swam competitively for South Korea. She has a younger sister and a younger brother, Cheon Seong-moon, an actor. Song dreamed of becoming an actress during her high school years after watching Park Shin-yang in the 1998 South Korean film, Promise. She graduated with a degree in tax accounting from Kyungmoon University (now Kookje University). Before entering the acting industry, Song was cast while working a part-time job at a cafe.

== Career ==
=== 2001–2005: Career beginnings ===
Before Song debuted as an actress, she was a model for Kiki Magazine. She chose "Song Ji-hyo" as her stage name because she was inspired by the two famous actors Song Seung-heon and Song Hye-kyo, both main protagonists of Autumn in My Heart. Song then appeared in the music videos of Lee Soo-young's "And I Love You" and JtL's "Just Say Goodbye". She also made a cameo appearance in the television series Age of Innocence.

Song made her feature film debut in Wishing Stairs (2003), the third installment of the horror Whispering Corridors film series, after beating out 3000 actors in an audition. Then she was nominated for the Best New Actress at the 24th Blue Dragon Film Awards for her performance in the film. She starred in the crime thriller Some (2004), where she played a reporter.

=== 2006–2009: Rising popularity ===
Song made her television debut in the romantic comedy, Princess Hours (2006), where she played a ballet dancer who dreams to be a ballerina. The series became hit across Asia, contributing to the Korean Wave. In the same year, she played the role of Lady Ye So-ya, the first wife of Jumong and the mother of King Yuri in the historical television series Jumong (2006). The series was a commercial hit, receiving the highest viewership ratings of all the Korean dramas that aired in 2006. Song experienced a rise in popularity and was nominated for Best New Actress in the TV category at the 43rd Baeksang Arts Awards for her performance.

The following year, Song starred as a swimming champion who has a painful past in the comedy film Sex Is Zero 2 (2007), the sequel to Sex Is Zero (2002) opposite Im Chang-jung. She also co-hosted SBS' music show Inkigayo, with Heechul of Super Junior from November 11, 2007, to May 4, 2008. Song then portrayed the role of Queen in Yoo Ha's film A Frozen Flower (2008), alongside Zo In-sung and Joo Jin-mo. The film became one of the highest-grossing films of 2008, and led to increased recognition for Song. She later commented about the film and her nude scenes, "When I decided to do this film, nudity was not the central issue. How much I expose is not important to me; I thought without that scene, it would be difficult to portray the subtle changes in emotion. What mattered to me at the time was working on my facial expressions apart from the posture that the director wanted me to convey".

=== 2010–present: International recognition ===
Song has been a member of the urban action variety show Running Man since 2010. She was requested to join by PD Kim Joo-hyung or also known as Myeok PD, whom she worked with while hosting Inkigayo. She appeared in the show as a guest from episode 2 to episode 5 then became a regular member in episode 6.

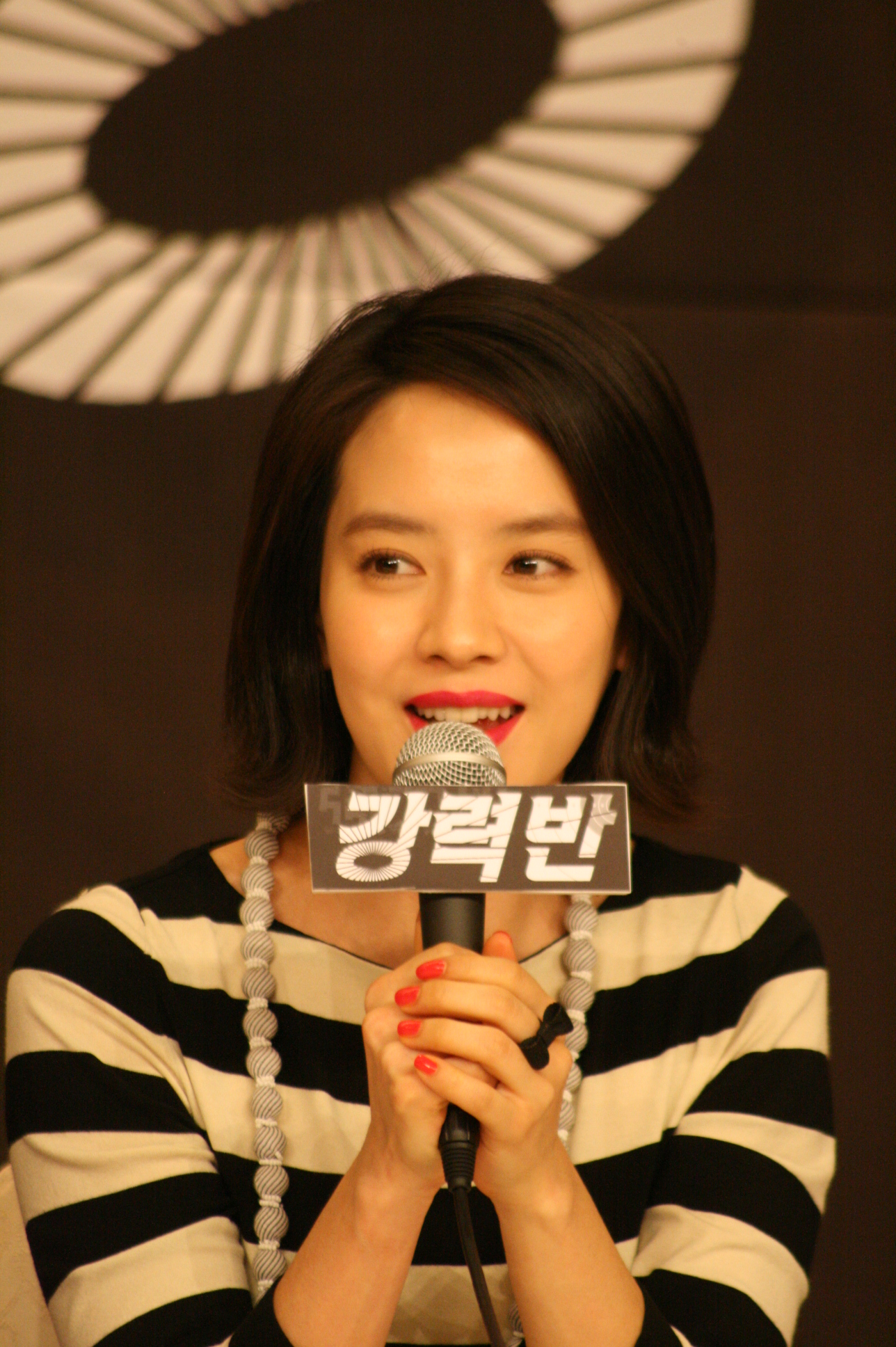
Song at the Crime Squad press conference in 2011

After her contract ended with Namoo Actors, Song signed with C-JeS Entertainment in early 2011 and appeared in Choo Chang-min's film Late Blossom (2011). The film is based on the comic I Love You by web cartoonist Kang Full. She reunited with Jumong co-star Song Il-gook in the police procedural television series Detectives in Trouble (2011) where she played a role as a reporter. Later in the year, she starred in the historical television series Gyebaek (2011) as the Queen of King Uija. In November, she was appointed as promotional ambassador for the Ministry of Education along with label-mates JYJ. Song then co-starred alongside Kim Jae-joong of JYJ in the action comedy Code Name: Jackal (2012) where she played a clumsy assassin.

The following year, Song participated in dubbing for the animated film Maritime Police Marco (2013) alongside fellow Running Man cast Lee Kwang-soo, and played a detective in Park Hoon-jung's crime film New World (2013). She also starred opposite Lee Dong-wook as a royal nurse in the historical television series The Fugitive of Joseon (2013).

Song took on the leading role in the medical romantic comedy television series Emergency Couple (2014) co-starring Choi Jin-hyuk, playing a divorced medical intern who encounters her ex-husband of an ugly divorce at an emergency room. Song also collaborated with NBA in a collaboration titled "NBA X Song Ji Hyo", which she released her own cap series called "CHO.2". In 2015, Song starred in the romantic comedy series Ex-Girlfriends' Club opposite Byun Yo-han as a film producer. She also featured and appeared in Taiwanese singer and actor Kenji Wu's music video "You Are So Cute".

In 2016, Song was cast alongside Taiwanese actor Chen Bolin in the reality variety show We Are In Love, the Chinese version of We Got Married. Song then starred in two Chinese films, the romantic drama 708090 opposite Kenji Wu and the action comedy Super Express. She then made her small-screen comeback, starring in the remake of a Japanese television series Listen to Love co-starring Lee Sun-kyun. In December, Song signed with the management agency, My Company, after ending her contract with C-JeS Entertainment.

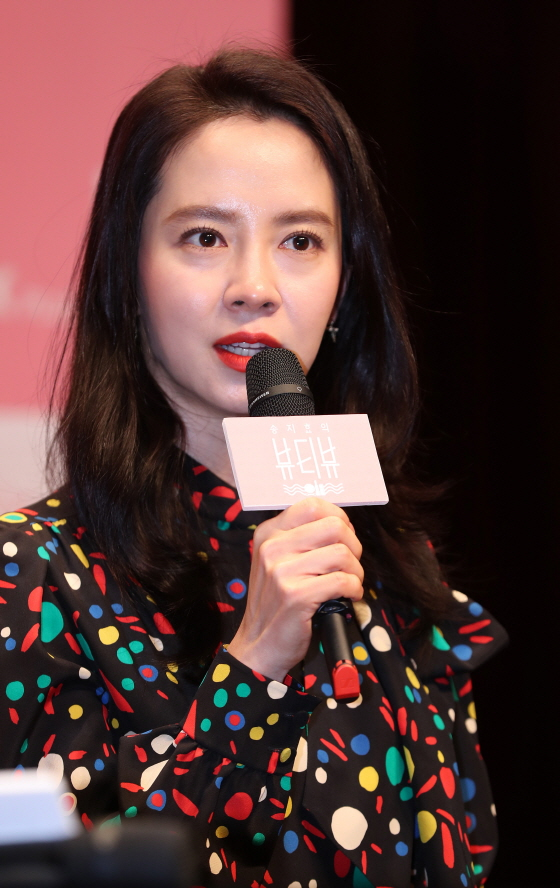
Song in January 2017

In 2017, Song co-hosted the beauty program Song Ji-hyo's Beauty View with Gong Myung. She next starred in the web series 29gram and acted in the one-act drama Chief B and the Love Letter co-starring Jo Woo-jin. Song produced and launched her first own reality program I Am Jyo Unnie in December 2017.

In 2018, Song starred in the romantic comedy film What a Man Wants alongside Lee Sung-min, Shin Ha-kyun, and Lee El. She co-hosted beauty program Song Ji Hyo's Beautiful Life and a reality program Pajama Friends. Song was also cast in the romance horror drama Lovely Horribly alongside Park Si-hoo, which premiered in August. Song then starred in the action thriller film Unstoppable alongside Ma Dong-seok.

In 2019, Song was cast in the mystery thriller film Intruder (Note: Previously known as Daughter) alongside Kim Mu-yeol. In October, Song signed with Creative Group ING after her contract with My Company ended in September. In November, Song was cast as female lead of JTBC drama Was It Love? alongside Kim Min-jun, Son Ho-jun, Song Jong-ho and Koo Ja-sung, which premiered in July 2020.

On February 2, 2021, Song was confirmed as the female lead for TVING web series The Witch's Diner which premiered in 2021.

In October 2022, Song signed with Uzurocks Entertainment, she terminated her contract due to a delay in payment in April 2023. On October 13, 2023, Song signed with Nexus E&M.

== Personal life ==
Song revealed on a May 2017 episode of Running Man that she had changed her birth name from "Cheon Seong-im" to "Cheon Soo-yeon" because "a lot of people recognize it nowadays".

== Endorsements ==
In 2001, Song made her debut as magazine cover model and has appeared in various commercials such as Boryeong Pharmaceutical's Nook, Paris Baguette, LG Household & Health Care's Cash Cat, Lotte Confectionery's Natuur Ice Cream, HiteJinro, SK Telecom's TTL, Pantene shampoo, and Nongshim's raw udon.

On April 5, 2006, Song signed an exclusive contract with Enprani to advertise their cosmetics brand Natural Bee. The contract was worth ₩250 million which was considered unprecedented treatment for a newcomer. A representative revealed that Song was chosen due to her "ability to express a variety of emotions from an intelligent image to cute feelings".

On May 2, 2017, Song was selected as the muse for Shinsegae's premium cosmetic brand, Vidivici. A representative revealed that Song was chosen for her "eight colors of charm, from a natural and fresh image to a luxurious and elegant atmosphere" that represented the brand's various images.

On December 13, 2021, Song was announced as an endorsement model for Nexus Pharma's Glutanex in Indonesia, Thailand, and Philippines.

== Other ventures ==
=== Collaborations ===
In 2014, it was announced that Song Ji Hyo was working with the NBA to release her own cap series called "CHO.2" in a collaboration called, "NBA X Song Ji Hyo". "CHO.2" stands for two Chinese characters that sum up her motto "to never lose the original heart so that you will do everything".

On April 30, 2016, Song Jihyo walked her First-Ever fashion runway With Hong Jonghyun as the main models of the Hallyu collaboration fashion show "Very Korean", which featured Korean designer brands like katiacho sponsored by the Ministry of Culture, Sports and Tourism and the Korea Foundation for Cultural Exchange which was held in Beijing, China.

=== Impact and influence ===
Korea Trade-Investment Promotion Agency (KOTRA) acknowledged that Song Ji-hyo not only demonstrated her influence and her popularity throughout Asia, but also her significant role in the spread of Hallyu's commercial success. On May 10, KOTRA conducted a survey with a report titled '2018 Asian Regional Marketing Indicator Research', for residents and businessmen in 9 Southeast Asian countries (Indonesia, Philippines, Vietnam, Thailand, Myanmar, Malaysia, Cambodia, Laos, and Singapore). She took first place in five questions: Famous Korean Person I Want to Meet in Person, Korean Figure Who Represents Technological Korea, Korean Figure Who Most Close Resembles My Type, Korean Figure Who Represents Quality Korean Products, and Korean Figure Who Reminds Me of Korean Products I Want To Buy. She was selected as the best Hallyu star in Southeast Asia.

Song have been cited as a role model for volleyball athlete Sara Hong, actress Park Eun-woo, actress Seo Jin-young, and Japanese model's Sato Moeka. UNB's Euijin, actor Lee Tae-hwan and Olympic figure skater Cha Jun-hwan mentioned her as an ideal type.

In 2021, Song was selected as one of the 200 actors to feature in the Korean actors 200 campaign, run by the Korean Film Council (KOFIC). The goal of the methodical project is to select actors that best represent the present and future of Korean film and introducing them to film people overseas.

== Filmography ==
=== Film ===
| Year | Title | Role | Notes | Ref. |
|---|---|---|---|---|
| 2003 | Wishing Stairs | Yoon Jin-sung | | |
| 2004 | Some | Seo Yoo-jin | | |
| 2007 | Sex Is Zero 2 | Lee Kyeong-ah | | |
| 2008 | A Frozen Flower | Queen Han Ik-bi | | |
| 2011 | Late Blossom | Kim Yeon-ah | | |
| 2012 | Code Name: Jackal | Bong Min-jung | | |
| 2013 | Maritime Police Marco | Lulu | Korean dubbing | |
| 2013 | New World | Lee Shin-woo | | |
| 2016 | 708090 | Duan Yu Rong | Chinese film | |
| 2016 | Super Express | Maggie / Meixi | Chinese film | |
| 2018 | What a Man Wants | Mi-young | | |
| 2018 | Unstoppable | Ji-soo | | |
| 2020 | Intruder | Yoo-jin | | |
| 2025 | Home Behind Bars | Tae-jeo | | |
| 2025 | Savior | Sun-hee | | |

=== Television series ===
| Year | Title | Role | Notes | Ref. |
|---|---|---|---|---|
| 2002 | Age of Innocence | Min-jung | Cameo, Episode 16 | |
| 2006 | Princess Hours | Min Hyo-rin | | |
| 2006–2007 | Jumong | Lady Ye So-ya | | |
| 2011 | Detectives in Trouble | Jo Min-joo | | |
| 2011 | Gyebaek | Eun-go | | |
| 2013 | The Fugitive of Joseon | Hong Da-in | | |
| 2014 | Emergency Couple | Oh Jin-hee | | |
| 2015 | A Girl Who Sees Smells | Herself | Cameo (Episode 1 with Running Man members) | |
| 2015 | Ex-Girlfriends' Club | Kim Soo-jin | | |
| 2016 | Listen to Love | Jung Soo-yeon | | |
| 2016 | Entourage | Herself | Cameo (Episode 3) | |
| 2017 | Drama Stage – "Chief B and the Love Letter" | Bang Ga-young | One-act drama | |
| 2018 | Lovely Horribly | Oh Eul-soon | | |
| 2020 | Was It Love? | Noh Ae-jung | | |
| 2022 | Shooting Stars | Song Ji-hee | Cameo (Episode 7) | |
| 2026 | 100 Days of Deception | Lee Ae-young | | |

=== Web series ===
| Year | Title | Role | Ref. |
|---|---|---|---|
| 2017 | 29gram | Yeon Yoo-jin | |
| 2021 | The Witch's Diner | Jo Hee-ra | |
| 2025 | Confidence Queen | Special appearance | On Prime Video, September 6 |

=== Television shows ===
| Year | Title | Role | Notes | Ref. |
|---|---|---|---|---|
| 2007–2008 | Inkigayo | Host | | |
| 2008–2009 | Dream Concert | Host | | |
| 2010–2011 | TV Entertainment Tonight | Presenter | | |
| 2010–present | Running Man | Cast member | Guest (Episode 2–5); Regular cast (Episode 7–present) | |
| 2016 | We Are In Love | Cast member | With Chen Bolin | |
| 2017 | Song Ji-hyo's Beauty View | Host | | |
| 2018 | Song Ji-hyo's Beautiful Life | Host | | |
| 2018 | Pajama Friends | Host | | |
| 2024 | Hemeko Show | Host | | |

=== Web show ===
| Year | Title | Role | Ref. |
|---|---|---|---|
| 2020 | I Am Jyo Unnie | Main host | |

=== Music video appearances ===
| Year | Title | Artist(s) | Ref. |
|---|---|---|---|
| 2001 | "Just Say Goodbye" | JtL | |
| 2001 | "And I Love You" | Lee Soo-young | |
| 2006 | "믿을 수 없는 말" | Stay | |
| 2010 | "Don't Listen To This Song" | Young Jee | |
| 2011 | "별 거 아니야" | Young Jee | |
| 2011 | "In Heaven" | JYJ | |
| 2012 | "Be Happy" | Young Jee and Lee Kyu-hoon | |
| 2013 | "Winter Song" | Freestyle | |
| 2016 | "Lonely Night" | Gary feat. Gaeko | |

== Discography ==
=== Singles ===
| Title | Year | Album |
|---|---|---|
| "Gift For You" (with Choi Kang-hee, Lee Sun-kyun and Kim Byung-man) | 2011 | Non-album single |
| "You are So Cute" (Kenji Wu feat. Song Ji-hyo) | 2015 | Non-album single |
| "Bonjour, Hi" (봉주르 하이) (with Yang Se-chan, Code Kunst and Nucksal as Hyo Chan Gong Won (효찬공원); feat. Yoon Mi-rae) | 2019 | Running Man Fan Meeting: Project Running 9 |
| I Like It (좋아) (with Running Man members) | 2019 | Running Man Fan Meeting: Project Running 9 |

== Ambassadorship ==
| Organization | Year | Title | Ref. |
|---|---|---|---|
| Chuncheon World Leisure Tournament Organizing Committee | 2009–2010 | Chuncheon World Leisure Congress and Competition Ambassador | |
| Ministry of Education, Science and Technology | 2011 | Ministry of Education, Science and Technology, School Culture Change Online Ambassador | |
| Korea Brand & Entertainment Expo (KBEE) | 2017 | Jakarta Hallyu Honorary Ambassador | |
| Korea Brand & Entertainment Expo (KBEE) | 2017 | Ho Chi Minh City Hallyu Honorary Ambassador | |
| Korea Brand & Entertainment Expo (KBEE) | 2018 | Singapore Hallyu Honorary Ambassador | |
| Korea Brand & Entertainment Expo (KBEE) | 2019 | Bangkok Hallyu Honorary Ambassador | |

== Accolades ==
=== Awards and nominations ===
Name of the award ceremony, year presented, category, nominee of the award, and the result of the nomination
| Award ceremony | Year | Category | Nominee(s) / work(s) | Result | Ref. |
|---|---|---|---|---|---|
| Asia Artist Awards | 2019 | Most Popular Actress | Song Ji-hyo | Won | |
| Asia Artist Awards | 2020 | Popularity Award (Actress) | Song Ji-hyo | Won | |
| Asia Artist Awards | 2021 | Popularity Award (Actress) | Song Ji-hyo | Won | |
| Blue Dragon Film Awards | 2003 | Best New Actress | Wishing Stairs | Nominated | |
| Blue Dragon Series Awards | 2022 | Best Actress | The Witch's Diner | Longlisted | |
| Blue Dragon Series Awards | 2022 | Best Female Entertainer | Outrun by Running Man | Longlisted | |
| Baeksang Arts Awards | 2007 | Best New Actress – Television | Jumong | Nominated | |
| Baeksang Arts Awards | 2008 | Most Popular Actress (Film) | Sex Is Zero 2 | Nominated | |
| Baeksang Arts Awards | 2009 | Most Popular Actress (Film) | A Frozen Flower | Nominated | |
| Baeksang Arts Awards | 2012 | Most Popular Actress (Television) | Gyabaek | Nominated | |
| Baeksang Arts Awards | 2012 | Best Female Entertainer | Running Man | Nominated | |
| Baeksang Arts Awards | 2013 | Best Female Entertainer | Running Man | Nominated | |
| Baeksang Arts Awards | 2013 | Most Popular Actress in a Film | New World | Nominated | |
| Brand Customer Loyalty Award | 2021 | Multitainer (Female) | Song Ji-hyo | Won | |
| Chunsa Film Art Awards | 2009 | Best New Actress | A Frozen Flower | Nominated | |
| DramaFever Awards | 2014 | Best Kiss | Song Ji-hyo (with Gary); Running Man | Won | |
| DramaFever Awards | 2014 | Best Couple Not Meant to Be | Song Ji-hyo (with Gary); Running Man | Nominated | |
| DramaFever Awards | 2015 | Best Actress of the Year | Emergency Couple | Won | |
| DramaFever Awards | 2015 | Boldest Moment | Emergency Couple | Won | |
| DramaFever Awards | 2015 | Best Couple Award | Song Ji-hyo (with Choi Jin-hyuk); Emergency Couple | Nominated | |
| IZE Magazine | 2020 | Rediscovery Award | Intruder | Won | |
| JTBC Awards (Note: JTBC Awards is an online award ceremony in which the winner(s) are decided by the viewers through online voting.) | 2016 | Impressive performances chosen by viewers | Listen to Love | Won | |
| KBS Drama Awards | 2011 | Excellence Actress Award in a Miniseries | Detectives in Trouble | Nominated | |
| KBS Drama Awards | 2011 | Netizen Award, Actress | Detectives in Trouble | Nominated | |
| KBS Drama Awards | 2013 | Excellence Actress Award in a Mid-length Drama | The Fugitive of Joseon | Nominated | |
| KBS Drama Awards | 2013 | Netizen's Award | The Fugitive of Joseon | Nominated | |
| KBS Drama Awards | 2018 | Excellence Award, Actress in a Miniseries | Lovely Horribly | Nominated | |
| KBS Drama Awards | 2018 | Netizen Award, Actress | Lovely Horribly | Nominated | |
| KBS Drama Awards | 2018 | Best Couple Award | Song Ji-hyo (with Park Si-hoo); Lovely Horribly | Nominated | |
| MBC Drama Awards | 2011 | Excellence Actress Award in a Miniseries | Gyebaek | Nominated | |
| MBC Drama Awards | 2011 | Producer's Award | Gyebaek | Won | |
| Macau International Movie Festival | 2014 | Best Supporting Actress | 708090 | Nominated | |
| Metro Best K-drama Awards | 2020 | People's Choice – Best Couple | Song Ji-hyo (with Son Ho-jun); Was It Love? | Nominated | |
| Metro Best K-drama Awards | 2020 | People's Choice – Best Kiss | Song Ji-hyo (with Son Ho-jun); Was It Love? | Nominated | |
| Metro Best K-drama Awards | 2020 | People's Choice – Best Actress | Was It Love? | Nominated | |
| Mnet 20's Choice Awards | 2011 | Hot Variety Star | Running Man | Nominated | |
| NATE Awards | 2013 | Best Couple | Song Ji-hyo (with Gary); Running Man | Won | |
| SBS Entertainment Awards | 2010 | Special Award in Variety | Running Man | Won | |
| SBS Entertainment Awards | 2011 | Excellence Award in Variety | Running Man | Won | |
| SBS Entertainment Awards | 2011 | Netizen's Popularity Award | Running Man | Nominated | |
| SBS Entertainment Awards | 2013 | Top Excellence Female Award | Running Man | Won | |
| SBS Entertainment Awards | 2013 | Best Couple | Song Ji-hyo (with Gary); Running Man | Nominated | |
| SBS Entertainment Awards | 2015 | Top Excellence Award in Variety | Running Man | Won | |
| SBS Entertainment Awards | 2020 | Golden Content Award | With Running Man members | Won | |
| SBS Entertainment Awards | 2021 | Best Couple Award | Song Ji-hyo (With Kim Jong-kook); Running Man | Nominated | |
| SBS Entertainment Awards | 2024 | Scene Stealer Award | Song Ji-hyo | Won | |
| Seoul Global Movie Awards | 2025 | Best Actress Award | Home Behind Bars | Won | |
| Sina Weibo Night Awards | 2016 | Best Trans-boundary Female Artist | Song Ji-hyo | Won | |
| Soompi Awards | 2016 | Best Actress of the Year | Ex-Girlfriend Club | Won | |
| YinYueTai V Chart Awards | 2016 | The Best Cooperation of the Year | Song Ji-hyo (with Kenji Wu) "You are So Cute" | Won | |

=== State honors ===
Name of the organization, year presented, and the award given
| Organization | Year | Award | Ref. |
|---|---|---|---|
| National Tax Service | 2017 | Model Taxpayer Award | |
| National Tax Service | 2023 | Presidential Commendation | |
