= 2018 KBS Drama Awards =

32nd edition of award ceremony

- Date: December 31, 2018
- Site: KBS Hall, Yeouido, Seoul
- Hosted by: Jun Hyun-moo; Uee
- Official website: 2018 KBS Drama Awards

Television coverage
- Network: KBS2, KBS World
- Duration: 260 minutes

The 2018 KBS Drama Awards, presented by Korean Broadcasting System (KBS), was held on December 31, 2018 at KBS Hall in Yeouido, Seoul. It was hosted by Jun Hyun-moo and Uee.

== Winners and nominees ==
(Winners denoted in bold)

Grand Prize (Daesang)
**Kim Myung-min** – **The Miracle We Met**; **Yoo Dong-geun** – **Marry Me Now?**
Top Excellence Award, Actor	Top Excellence Award, Actress
**Cha Tae-hyun** – **Matrimonial Chaos**; **Choi Soo-jong** – **My Only One**; Kim Myung-min – The Miracle We Met; Kim Rae-won – Black Knight: The Man Who Guards Me; Jang Dong-gun – Suits; Yoo Dong-geun – Marry Me Now?	**Cha Hwa-yeon** – **My Only One**; **Chang Mi-hee** – **Marry Me Now?, Black Knight: The Man Who Guards Me**; Bae Doona – Matrimonial Chaos; Choi Kang-hee – Queen of Mystery 2; Kim Hyun-joo – The Miracle We Met; Shin Se-kyung – Black Knight: The Man Who Guards Me
Excellence Award, Actor in a Miniseries	Excellence Award, Actress in a Miniseries
**Choi Daniel** – **Jugglers, The Ghost Detective**; **Jang Dong-gun** – **Suits**; Cha Tae-hyun – Matrimonial Chaos; Ha Seok-jin – Your House Helper; Kang Ji-hwan – Feel Good to Die; Kwon Sang-woo – Queen of Mystery 2; Park Hyung-sik – Suits; Park Si-hoo – Lovely Horribly	**Baek Jin-hee** – **Jugglers, Feel Good to Die**; Bae Doona – Matrimonial Chaos; Choi Kang-hee – Queen of Mystery 2; Lee El – Matrimonial Chaos; Park Eun-bin – The Ghost Detective; Song Ji-hyo – Lovely Horribly
Excellence Award, Actor in a Mid-length Drama	Excellence Award, Actress in a Mid-length Drama
**Seo Kang-joon** – **Are You Human?**; Kim Myung-min – The Miracle We Met; Kim Rae-won – Black Knight: The Man Who Guards Me; Lee Joon-hyuk – Are You Human?	**Ra Mi-ran** – **The Miracle We Met**; Gong Seung-yeon – Are You Human?; Kim Hyun-joo – The Miracle We Met; Seo Ji-hye – Black Knight: The Man Who Guards Me; Shin Se-kyung – Black Knight: The Man Who Guards Me
Excellence Award, Actor in a Serial Drama	Excellence Award, Actress in a Serial Drama
**Lee Jang-woo** – **My Only One**; **Lee Sang-woo** – **Marry Me Now?**; Choi Soo-jong – My Only One; Park Sang-won – My Only One; Yoo Dong-geun – Marry Me Now?	**Han Ji-hye** – **Marry Me Now?**; **Uee** – **My Only One**; Cha Hwa-yeon – My Only One; Chang Mi-hee – Marry Me Now?; Park Sun-young – Marry Me Now?
Excellence Award, Actor in a Daily Drama	Excellence Award, Actress in a Daily Drama
**Kang Eun-tak** – **Love to the End**; **Park Yoon-jae** – **It's My Life**; Han Sang-jin – Mysterious Personal Shopper; Kim Eung-soo – Lady Cha Dal-rae's Lover; Shim Ji-ho – Love to the End	**Ha Hee-ra** – **Lady Cha Dal-rae's Lover**; **Park Ha-na** – **Mysterious Personal Shopper**; Hong Soo-ah – Love to the End; Lee Young-ah – Love to the End; Seo Hyo-rim – It's My Life; Wang Bit-na – Mysterious Personal Shopper
Excellence Award, Actor in a One-Act/Special/Short Drama	Excellence Award, Actress in a One-Act/Special/Short Drama
**Jang Dong-yoon** – **Just Dance**; **Yoon Park** – **Drama Special – The Tuna and the Dolphin**; Kim Kang-woo – After the Rain; Kim Mu-yeol – Drama Special – Forgotten Season; Park Sung-hoon – Review Notebook of My Embarrassing Days; Shin Goo – After the Rain	**Lee Il-hwa** – **Drama Special – My Mom's Third Marriage**; **Lee Seol** – **After the Rain**; Choi Kang-hee – Drama Special – Too Bright for Romance; Jeon So-min – Drama Special – Review Notebook of My Embarrassing Days; Go Bo-gyeol – Drama Special – Forgotten Season; Park Se-wan – Drama Special – Too Bright for Romance
Best New Actor	Best New Actress
**Kim Kwon** – **Marry Me Now?**; **Park Sung-hoon** – **My Only One**, **Black Knight: The Man Who Guards Me**; Jin Ju-hyung – Sunny Again Tomorrow; Kai – The Miracle We Met; Lee Gi-kwang – Lovely Horribly; Son Suk-ku – Suits, Matrimonial Chaos	**Park Se-wan** – **Just Dance**, **Marry Me Now?**; **Seol In-ah** – **Sunny Again Tomorrow**; Cha Joo-young – Jugglers; Keum Sae-rok – Marry Me Now?; Jo Woo-ri – Queen of Mystery 2; Jung Hye-in – Jugglers, Love to the End; Lee Joo-young – The Ghost Detective
Best Supporting Actor	Best Supporting Actress
**In Gyo-jin** – **Feel Good to Die**, **Jugglers**; **Kim Won-hae** – **The Ghost Detective**, **Are You Human?**; Choi Byung-mo – Are You Human?, The Miracle We Met; Choi Gwi-hwa – Suits; Yu Oh-seong – Are You Human?	**Kim Hyun-sook** – **Are You Human?**, **Queen of Mystery 2**; **Yoon Jin-yi** – **My Only One**; Ji Soo-won – Sunny Again Tomorrow; Jin Kyung – My Only One; Kim Sung-ryung – Are You Human?; Ko Sung-hee – Suits
Best Young Actor	Best Young Actress
**Nam Da-reum** – **Radio Romance**; Kim Tae-yool – Lovely Horribly; Park Min-su – Queen of Mystery 2; Suh Dong-hyun – The Miracle We Met; Sung Yu-bin – Black Knight: The Man Who Guards Me	**Kim Hwan-hee** – **The Miracle We Met**; Heo Jung-eun – The Ghost Detective; Lee Re – Radio Romance; Park Ga-ram – Black Knight: The Man Who Guards Me; Shin Rin-ah – Lovely Horribly
Netizen Award	Best Writer
**Kim Myung-min** – **The Miracle We Met**; **Park Hyung-sik** – **Suits**	**Kim Sa-kyung** – **My Only One**
Best Couple Award
**Cha Tae-hyun** and **Bae Doona** – **Matrimonial Chaos**; **Choi Daniel** and **Baek Jin-hee** – **Jugglers**; **Choi Soo-jong** and **Jin Kyung** – **My Only One**; **Kim Myung-min** and **Ra Mi-ran** – **The Miracle We Met**; **Lee Jang-woo** and **Uee** – **My Only One**; **Seo Kang-joon** and **Gong Seung-yeon** – **Are You Human?** **Yoo Dong-geun** and **Chang Mi-hee** – **Marry Me Now?**

== Presenters ==
Order	Presenter	Award
1	Jung Joon-won, Lee Re	Best Young Actor/Actress
2	Woo Do-hwan, Kim Se-jeong	Best New Actor/Actress
3	Kim Sung-oh, Jung Hye-sung	Best Supporting Actor/Actress
4	Yeo Hoe-hyun, Shin Ji-ho	Best Actor/Actress in a One-Act/Special/Short Drama
5	Kim Seung-soo, Im Soo-hyang	Excellence Award in a Daily Drama
6	Park Shi-hoo, Lee Soo-kyung	Excellence Award in a Serial Drama
7	Yoo Min-sang, Kim Jun-hyun	Netizen Award
8	Moon Bo-hyun, Kim Hae-sook	Writer of the Year
9	Choi Soo-jong, Ha Hee-ra	Best Couple Award
10	Oh Ji-ho, Lee Si-young	Excellence Award in a Miniseries
11	Park Seo-joon	Excellence Award in a Mid-length Drama
12	Lee Dong-gun, Lee Yoo-ri	Top Excellence Award
13	Yang Seung-dong, Chun Ho-jin	Grand Prize (Daesang)

== Special performances ==
Order	Artist	Performed
1	Kim Soo-dong, Noh Sa-bong, Lee Young-hyun, Kim Myung-hoon of Ulala Session	Intro: What do KBS dramas mean to me?
1	Kim Myung-hoon of Ulala Session feat. Shin Ji-ho and Brillante Children's Choir	"No One Else" (그런 사람 또 없습니다) (My Only One OST)
2	Hyolyn	"Clock" (태엽시계) (Black Knight: The Man Who Guards Me OST)
2	Hyolyn	"See Sea" (바다보러갈래)
2	Hyolyn	"Dally" (달리)

== See also ==
- 2018 MBC Drama Awards
- 2018 SBS Drama Awards
