= The Real Has Come! =

2023 South Korean television series

- Promotional poster
- Also known as: The Real Deal Has Come!; The Real Appeared!; The Real Deal
- Hangul: 진짜가 나타났다!
- Lit.: The Real One Appeared!
- RR: Jinjjaga natanatda!
- MR: Chintchaga nat'anatta!
- Genre: Family drama; Romantic comedy
- Developed by: KBS Drama Division
- Written by: Jo Jeong-joo
- Directed by: Han Joon-seo
- Starring: Baek Jin-hee; Ahn Jae-hyun; Cha Joo-young; Jung Eui-jae
- Music by: Choi In-hee
- Country of origin: South Korea
- Original language: Korean
- No. of episodes: 50

Production
- Executive producer: Ki Min-soo (KBS)
- Producers: Cho Yoon-jung; Lee Hae-woo; Lee Seung-beom
- Camera setup: Single-camera
- Running time: 80 minutes
- Production companies: Victory Contents; The Real Has Come SPC

Original release
- Network: KBS2
- Release: March 25 – September 10, 2023

The Real Has Come! (Korean: 진짜가 나타났다!) is a 2023 South Korean television series starring Baek Jin-hee, Ahn Jae-hyun, Cha Joo-young, and Jung Eui-jae. It premiered on KBS2 on March 25, 2023, and aired every Saturday and Sunday at 19:55 (KST) for 50 episodes. It is available for streaming on Kocowa, Viki and Viu in selected regions.

The series ended on September 10, 2023, with 22.9% viewership ratings for its finale episode.

== Synopsis ==
The series depicts the story of an unmarried pregnant woman and an unmarried man who enter into a false contract which leads them to romance, pregnancy, childbirth, and childrearing.

== Cast ==
=== Main ===
- Baek Jin-hee as Oh Yeon-doo

33 years old, a Korean language instructor, who is a star in the online lecture world. She is a K-eldest daughter with a unique positive mindset, which gives her tenacity, and ability to survive at the highest level.

- Ahn Jae-hyun as Gong Tae-kyung

34 years old, a highly skilled obstetrician and gynecologist specializing in infertility clinics. The third son of a wealthy chaebol family.

- Cha Joo-young as Jang Se-jin

34 years old, a childhood friend of Gong Tae-kyung and NX Group Chief of Staff. She has outstanding work ability and assists the chairman, she is also trusted by the chairman's family.

- Jung Eui-jae as Kim Jun-ha

34 years old, Oh Yeon-doo's ex-boyfriend, an investment expert who values investment the most. The biological father of the child inside Yeon-doo's belly.

=== Supporting ===
==== Tae-kyung's family ====
- Kang Boo-ja as Eun Geum-sil

80 years old, Gong Tae-kyung's step-grandmother, mother of corporate chairman Gong Chan-sik.

- Hong Yo-seob (Ep. 1–15) / Sunwoo Jae-duk (Ep. 17–50) as Gong Chan-sik (Note: Hong Yo-seob stepped down from the series after the 15th episode due to personal reasons. He was replaced by Sunwoo Jae-duk for the role of Gong Chan-sik.)

64 years old, corporate chairman of NX Group, Gong Tae-kyung's step-father.

- Cha Hwa-yeon as Lee In-ok

59 years old, Gong Chan-sik's wife and Gong Tae-kyung's mother.

- Choi Dae-chul as Gong Chun-myeong

39 years old, Gong Tae-kyung's older brother, managing director, finance team, NX Group.

- Yoon Joo-hee as Yeom Su-jeong

35 years old, Gong Chun-myeong's wife. She comes from a strong family background and has a high nose. Even her mother-in-law pampers her.

- Choi Ja-hye as Gong Ji-myeong

37 years old, Gong Tae-kyung's older sister, she is a managing director at her father's company. She is married to her brother's medical school senior Cha Hyun-woo.

- Kim Sa-kwon as Cha Hyun-woo

37 years old, chief of obstetrics and gynecology and the husband of Gong Tae-kyung's older sister Gong Ji-myeong.

- Lee Ye-hyun as Gong Yoo-myeong

26 years old, Tae-kyung's younger sister, rich family's youngest daughter.

==== Yeon-doo's family ====
- Kim Hye-ok as Kang Bong-nim

59 years old, Oh Yeon-doo's mother, who cares deeply for her children.

- Ryu Jin as Kang Dae-sang

43 years old, Yeondu's maternal uncle, Bong-nim's younger brother.

- Choi Yoon-jae as Oh Dong-wook

25 years old, Oh Yeon-doo's younger brother, a single dad, who is raising a daughter by himself after becoming a father at the age of 18.

- Jeong Seo-yeon as Oh Soo-gyeom

7 years old, Oh Yeon-doo's niece and Oh Dong-wook's daughter.

==== Se-jin's family ====
- Kim Chang-wan as Jang Ho

64 years old, Se-jin's father, very compassionate and upright person.

- Lee Kan-hee as Joo Hwa-ja

55 years old, Se-jin's mother, loves to be in the spotlight and is prone to vanity and extravagance.

=== Extended ===
- Sung Hyuk as Yeon Sang-hoon, Gong Ji-myeong's junior
- Yoon Ah-jeong as pharmacist
- Jung Soo-young as Seon Woo-hee, Kang Dae-sang's first-love
- Min Chae-eun as Song Songi, Oh Soo-gyeom's mother and the owner of a cafe at Joy Entertainment

=== Special appearance ===
- Cha Min-ji as Jin Soo-ji

Announcer, Gong Tae-kyung's girlfriend (Ep. 1).

- Chae Min-hee as Eka Kim, Eun Geum-sil's granddaughter and Kim Jun-ha's sister (Ep. 42, 43)

== Production ==
Initially Kwak Si-yang was selected as main lead opposite Baek Jin-hee, but on December 21, 2022, it was reported that he dropped out due to scheduling problems. Ahn Jae-hyun replaced him: the series marked his television comeback after 3 years since the 2019 series Love with Flaws. For Baek Jin-hee, The Red Has Come! was her first TV series in four years after Feel Good to Die. Photos from the script reading were revealed on February 9, 2023.

== Release ==
A teaser poster announced the release date on February 16, 2023. The first episode was aired on March 25, 2023 and recorded a viewership rating of 17.7%, which is 2.8% points lower than the ratings of the first episode of the previous KBS weekend drama. The last episode was aired on September 10.

== Original soundtrack ==
The Real Has Come!

Soundtrack album by Various
- Released: 2023
- Genre: Soundtrack
- Languages: Korean; English
- Labels: NHN Bugs; Victory Contents

=== Part 1 ===
Released on March 25, 2023
No.	Title	Lyrics	Music	Artist	Length
1.	"Where Your Feet Stay" (그대 발길 머무는 곳에)	Ha Ji-young	Lee Ho-jun	Kim Hee-jae	3:27
2.	"Where Your Feet Stay" (그대 발길 머무는 곳에; Inst.)		Lee Ho-jun		3:27
Total length:					6:54

=== Part 2 ===
Released on May 20, 2023
No.	Title	Lyrics	Music	Artist	Length
1.	"Eulachacha" (으라차차)	Nautilus, New York King	Nautilus, New York King	Nautilus	3:47
2.	"Eulachacha" (으라차차; Inst.)		Nautilus, New York King		3:47
Total length:					7:34

=== Part 3 ===
Released on July 1, 2023
No.	Title	Lyrics	Music	Artist	Length
1.	"Song With You" (그대와의 노래)	Do It	Do It	Yeongyeongi	3:12
2.	"Song With You" (그대와의 노래; Inst.)		Do It		3:12
Total length:					6:24

== Viewership ==
The Real Has Come : South Korea viewers per episode (millions)

Episodes	Episode number									
Episodes	1	2	3	4	5	6	7	8	9	10
1–10	3.150	3.776	3.104	3.423	2.846	3.558	3.115	3.818	3.489	4.058
11–20	3.612	3.541	3.304	3.701	3.061	3.477	3.037	3.503	3.306	3.664
21–30	3.271	3.422	3.243	3.695	3.036	3.595	3.100	3.856	3.114	3.655
31–40	3.190	3.910	3.501	3.972	3.689	4.200	3.524	3.949	3.613	4.186
41–50	3.668	4.216	3.627	4.002	3.572	4.201	3.987	4.330	3.602	4.268

Source: Audience measurement performed nationwide by Nielsen Korea.

Average TV viewership ratings
Ep.	Original broadcast date	Average audience share		
Ep.	Original broadcast date	Nielsen Korea		TNmS
Ep.	Original broadcast date	Nationwide	Seoul	Nationwide
1	March 25, 2023	17.7% (1st)	16.3% (2nd)	13.7% (1st)
2	March 26, 2023	20.8% (1st)	18.8% (1st)	17.1% (1st)
3	April 1, 2023	18.1% (2nd)	16.4% (2nd)	12.9% (2nd)
4	April 2, 2023	19.5% (1st)	17.9% (1st)	16.6% (1st)
5	April 8, 2023	16.5% (2nd)	15.3% (2nd)	13.5% (2nd)
6	April 9, 2023	20.1% (1st)	18.1% (1st)	17.3% (1st)
7	April 15, 2023	18.3% (2nd)	16.3% (2nd)	N/A
8	April 16, 2023	21.7% (1st)	19.2% (1st)	17.9% (1st)
9	April 22, 2023	20.1% (1st)	19.0% (1st)	N/A
10	April 23, 2023	23.1% (1st)	21.7% (1st)	18.1% (1st)
11	April 29, 2023	20.5% (1st)	18.7% (1st)	15.2% (1st)
12	April 30, 2023	19.6% (1st)	17.7% (1st)	16.3% (1st)
13	May 6, 2023	19.1% (1st)	17.5% (1st)	N/A
14	May 7, 2023	20.4% (1st)	18.7% (1st)	17.2% (1st)
15	May 13, 2023	17.6% (1st)	15.7% (1st)	14.7% (1st)
16	May 14, 2023	20.0% (1st)	18.5% (1st)	17.3% (1st)
17	May 20, 2023	17.4% (1st)	16.6% (1st)	14.2% (1st)
18	May 21, 2023	19.8% (1st)	18.4% (1st)	16.5% (1st)
19	May 27, 2023	18.8% (1st)	18.6% (1st)	N/A
20	May 28, 2023	20.2% (1st)	18.9% (1st)	16.5% (1st)
21	June 3, 2023	19.0% (1st)	17.8% (1st)	N/A
22	June 4, 2023	20.1% (1st)	18.9% (1st)	19.5% (1st)
23	June 10, 2023	19.4% (1st)	18.0% (1st)	N/A
24	June 11, 2023	21.0% (1st)	19.7% (1st)	17.4% (1st)
25	June 17, 2023	18.1% (1st)	16.6% (2nd)	15.3% (1st)
26	June 18, 2023	20.2% (1st)	18.8% (1st)	16.0% (1st)
27	June 24, 2023	18.1% (1st)	16.6% (1st)	N/A
28	June 25, 2023	21.7% (1st)	19.8% (1st)	16.4% (1st)
29	July 1, 2023	18.1% (1st)	17.3% (1st)	13.7% (1st)
30	July 2, 2023	21.0% (1st)	19.5% (1st)	15.5% (1st)
31	July 8, 2023	18.2% (1st)	17.0% (1st)	14.4% (1st)
32	July 9, 2023	21.5% (1st)	20.5% (1st)	17.1% (1st)
33	July 15, 2023	20.6% (1st)	19.5% (1st)	15.6% (1st)
34	July 16, 2023	22.7% (1st)	21.3% (1st)	17.8% (1st)
35	July 22, 2023	21.7% (1st)	20.5% (1st)	16.9% (1st)
36	July 23, 2023	23.9% (1st)	22.4% (1st)	18.8% (1st)
37	July 29, 2023	20.6% (1st)	19.9% (1st)	14.7% (1st)
38	July 30, 2023	22.8% (1st)	21.5% (1st)	18.4% (1st)
39	August 5, 2023	21.2% (1st)	19.9% (1st)	N/A (Note: Due to unknown reasons, TNmS did not issue the average TV viewership ratings for all free-to-air television programs in South Korea from August 4 to 10, 2023. TNmS resumed issuing those for the August 11, 2023 24-hour period on August 12, 2023.)
40	August 6, 2023	22.8% (1st)	21.5% (1st)	N/A
41	August 12, 2023	20.5% (1st)	18.5% (1st)	15.5% (1st)
42	August 13, 2023	23.8% (1st)	21.5% (1st)	19.4% (1st)
43	August 19, 2023	20.9% (1st)	19.4% (1st)	N/A
44	August 20, 2023	22.0% (1st)	20.0% (1st)	18.0% (1st)
45	August 26, 2023	21.0% (1st)	19.7% (1st)	N/A
46	August 27, 2023	23.3% (1st)	21.8% (1st)	19.3% (1st)
47	September 2, 2023	22.7% (1st)	20.5% (1st)	N/A
48	September 3, 2023	23.6% (1st)	21.4% (1st)	18.8% (1st)
49	September 9, 2023	20.9% (1st)	19.1% (1st)	N/A
50	September 10, 2023	22.9% (1st)	20.4% (1st)	19.7% (1st)
Average		20.5%	19.0%	— (Note: Due to multiple unpublished ratings, the exact average rating is unknown.)
In the table above, the blue numbers represent the lowest ratings and the red numbers represent the highest ratings.; N/A denotes ratings that were not published.

== Accolades ==
Award ceremony	Year	Category	Nominee	Result	Ref.
APAN Star Awards	2023	Top Excellence Award, Actress in a Serial Drama	Baek Jin-hee	Nominated	
APAN Star Awards	2023	Excellence Award, Actress in a Serial Drama	Cha Joo-young	Nominated	
KBS Drama Awards	2023	Excellence Award, Actress in a Serial Drama	Baek Jin-hee	Won	
KBS Drama Awards	2023	Popularity Award, Actor	Ahn Jae-hyun	Won	
KBS Drama Awards	2023	Best Couple Award	Ahn Jae-hyun and Baek Jin-hee	Won	
