= The King of Pigs (TV series) =

2022 South Korean web series

- Promotional poster
- Hangul: 돼지의 왕
- RR: Dwaejiui wang
- MR: Twaejiŭi wang
- Based on: The King of Pigs by Yeon Sang-ho
- Developed by: Tving (Production Plan)
- Written by: Tak Jae-young
- Directed by: Kim Dae-jin
- Starring: Kim Dong-wook; Kim Sung-kyu; Chae Jung-an
- Music by: Jeon Se-jin
- Country of origin: South Korea
- Original language: Korean
- No. of episodes: 12

Production
- Producers: Jang Jung-do; Kim Kyung-kyu
- Running time: 40 minutes
- Production companies: Studio Dragon; Hidden Sequence

Original release
- Network: TVING
- Release: March 18 – April 22, 2022

The King of Pigs (Korean: 돼지의 왕; RR: Dwaejiui wang) is a South Korean web series starring Kim Dong-wook, Kim Sung-kyu, and Chae Jung-an. A live-action remake of Yeon Sang-ho's 2011 animated film of the same name, the series depicts a thriller drama of those who brought out memories of violence due to a mysterious serial murder that began with a message from a friend 20 years ago. It premiered on TVING on March 18, 2022.

== Synopsis ==
Hwang Gyeong-min is a 35-year-old serial killer who has never forgotten being viciously bullied 20 years ago. Jung Jong-seok is a 35-year-old detective who tracks messages from a friend from 20 years ago. Kang Jin-ah is a charismatic detective with strong principles and an obsession with solving cases. Jin-ah and Jong-seok try to find Gyeong-min's targets after the brutal murder of his first target. The crux of the story shows the dark secrets of classmates Jong-seok and Gyeong-min as he tries to expose the truth behind a death 20 years ago.

== Cast ==
=== Main ===
- Kim Dong-wook as Hwang Gyeong-min/Nam Gi-cheol, who lives without forgetting the memories of school violence 20 years ago, now in the guise of a taxi cooperation ceo.
  - Lee Chan-yu as young Hwang Gyeong-min
- Kim Sung-kyu as Jung Jong-seok, a detective who tracks messages from a friend 20 years ago.
  - Shim Hyun-seo as young Jung Jong-seok.
- Chae Jung-an as Kang Jin-ah, a charismatic detective who is a strong-willed principle dist and is obsessed with cases.
- Choi Hyun-jin as Kim Cheol, a classmate who had guts to fight the bullies.

=== Supporting ===
==== People around Hwang Kyung-min ====
- Han Soo-yeon as Park Min-joo, gyeong-min's wife.
- Lee Ji-ha as Gyeong-min's mother.
- Ryoo Sung-Hyun as Gyeong-min's abusive father.

==== Others ====
- Hwang Man-ik as Park Seong-jin.
- Jung Eui-jae as Jin Hae-soo, the youngest detective on the powerful team that investigates a mysterious serial murder case.
- Oh Min-suk as Kang Min
  - Moon Seong-hyun as young Kang Min
- Ji Chan as Cho Pil-doo, Jong-seok's colleague.
- Park Jin as Doo Man-jae, is a police detective who helps Jong-seok uncover the case.
- Kim Min-sik as Kim Min-seok, the youngest member of the Seodong Police Station's first strong team.
- Yang So-min as Kim Hyeon-jeong, an acquaintance of Hwang Kyung-min's wife and the director of neuropsychiatry.
- Lee Tae-gum as Seo Dong-jin, Gwangsudae's team leader.
- Kim Min-seok as Choi Seong-gyu, one of the students who brutally commit school violence against Hwang Kyung-min.
  - Jang Dae-woong as young Seong Gyu
- Bae Yoo-ram as Park Chan-young
  - Kang Ji Seok as young Chan-young
- Choi Kwang-je as Ahn Jung-hee
  - Song Seung Hwan as young Jung-hee
- Lee Geung-young as Choi Seok-ki, a corrupt teacher who loves money and tolerates school bullying.
- Woo Mi-hwa as Kim Cheol's mother
- Ahn Doo-ho as Nam Deok-woo
- Kang Jung-woo as Lee Ki-won
- Lee Joon-ha as Jung Soo, an 11th grader senior and Jong-bin's aide.
- Jo Wan-ki as Kim Jong-bin

== Release ==
The series first aired on the online streaming service TVING on March 18, 2022, with a 19+ rating.

On June 2, 2022, it was reported that The King of Pigs would be rerun on OCN on June 19, 2022, with a 19+ rating as with its original airing.

In July 2022, it was confirmed that the drama would be shown at Fantasia 2022, making it the first drama series to be shown at the festival.

== Ratings ==
Average TV viewership ratings (nationwide)
Ep.	Original broadcast date	Average audience share (Nielsen Korea)
1	June 19, 2022	1.107%
2	June 19, 2022	1.117%
3	June 26, 2022	0.911%
4	June 26, 2022	0.961%
5	July 3, 2022	0.664%
6	July 3, 2022	0.755%
7	July 10, 2022	0.848%
8	July 10, 2022	0.930%
9	July 17, 2022	0.690%
10	July 17, 2022	1.036%
11	July 24, 2022	1.107%
12	July 24, 2022	1.281%
Average		0.929%
In the table above, the blue numbers represent the lowest ratings and the red numbers represent the highest ratings.
