= Foxy Festival =

2010 film by Lee Hae-young

- Hangul: 페스티발
- Lit.: Festival
- RR: Peseutibal
- MR: P'esŭt'ibal
- Directed by: Lee Hae-young
- Written by: Lee Hae-young
- Produced by: Lee Jung-se; Jo Chul-hyun; Lim Min-sub; William Kim
- Starring: Shin Ha-kyun; Uhm Ji-won; Shim Hye-jin; Sung Dong-il; Ryoo Seung-bum; Baek Jin-hee; Oh Dal-su
- Cinematography: Jo Sang-yun
- Edited by: Nam Na-yeong
- Music by: Dalpalan
- Production companies: Daisy Entertainment; Achim Pictures; Tiger Pictures
- Distributed by: Showbox/Mediaplex
- Release date: November 18, 2010
- Running time: 110 minutes
- Country: South Korea
- Language: Korean

Foxy Festival (Korean: 페스티발) is a 2010 South Korean film with an all-star ensemble cast. It is a character-driven comedy of manners about the discreet sexual lives of a group of interconnected people in an upper-middle class district of Seoul.

== Plot ==
Loose cannon Kwak Jang-bae (Shin Ha-kyun), a neighborhood policeman, is obsessed with his sexual prowess and continually wants to have sex with his live-in girlfriend, Ji-su (Uhm Ji-won), an English teacher at a private school who is bored with his macho behavior. Forthright high-school student Ju Ja-hye (Baek Jin-hee) sells her sweat-stained panties on the internet and wants to lose her virginity to scruffy fish-sausage seller Choi-kang Sang-du (Ryoo Seung-bum); the older man is uninterested in her advances but Ja-hye cannot work out why. Ja-hye's mother (Shim Hye-jin), who sells hanbok (traditional Korean female dress), discovers the owner of a hardware shop opposite, Gi-bong (Sung Dong-il), is into S&M and starts having sessions with him in the back of his shop, assuming a dominatrix role. Kim Gwang-rok (Oh Dal-su), Ja-hye's teacher, is a married man who is secretly into wearing women's clothes when his wife is not around. When Jang-bae discovers Ji-su has ordered a vibrator, he has a major crisis over his manhood and stops sleeping with her. Meanwhile, as his neighborhood has been marked for a moral clean-up campaign by the police, it's only time before Jang-bae also bumps heads with its denizens' licentious goings-on.

== Cast ==
- Shin Ha-kyun ... Kwak Jang-bae, policeman
- Uhm Ji-won ... Ji-su, Jang-bae's girlfriend
- Shim Hye-jin .... Ju Seon-shim, hanbok shop owner
- Sung Dong-il ... Gi-bong, hardware shop owner
- Ryoo Seung-bum ... Choi-kang Sang-du, fish-sausage hawker
- Baek Jin-hee ... Ja-hye, Seon-shim's daughter
- Oh Dal-su ... Kim Gwang-rok, teacher
- Choi Kwon ... In-su
- Mun Se-yun ... Deok-gu
- Jo Gyeong-suk ... Gwang-rok's wife
- Oh Yun-hong ... flower-shop lady
- Kim Tae-jong ... hairdresser
- Kim Ah-joong ... air doll (cameo)
- Han Sang-jin ... delivery man
- Park So-hyeon
