= Kill Heel =

2022 South Korean drama television series

- Promotional poster
- Hangul: 킬힐
- RR: Kilhil
- MR: K'irhil
- Genre: Drama; Thriller
- Created by: tvN (Production Plan)
- Written by: Lee Choon-woo; Sin Kwang-ho
- Directed by: Noh Do-cheol
- Starring: Kim Ha-neul; Lee Hye-young; Kim Sung-ryung
- Music by: Seol Ki-tae (Music Manager)
- Country of origin: South Korea
- Original language: Korean
- No. of episodes: 14

Production
- Camera setup: Single-camera
- Running time: 60 minutes
- Production companies: Ubi Culture; May Queen Pictures

Original release
- Network: tvN
- Release: March 9 – April 21, 2022

Kill Heel (Korean: 킬힐; RR: Kilhil) is a 2022 South Korean television series directed by Noh Do-cheol and starring Kim Ha-neul, Lee Hye-young, and Kim Sung-ryung. The series depicts the lives of three women who have a strong desire to achieve success in the home shopping industry. It premiered on tvN on March 9, 2022 and aired every Wednesday and Thursday at 22:30 (KST) for 14 episodes.

== Cast and characters ==
=== Main ===
- Kim Ha-neul as Woo-hyun

39 years old, a show host at UNI Home Shopping. Once a very successful show host with a lot of accordance, now her career is on decline to the level of selling toilet paper.

- Lee Hye-young as Gi Mo-ran
  - Kim Min-joo as young Gi Mo-ran

CFO, UNI Home Shopping

- Kim Sung-ryung as Bae Ok-sun
  - Min Soo-hwa as young Bae Ok-sun

52 years old, a high-class and UNI home shopping signboard show host.

=== Supporting ===
==== People around Woo Hyun ====
- Kim Jin-woo as Kim Do-il, Woo Hyun's jobless husband
- Jung Seo-yeon as Kim Ji-yoon, Woo Hyun and Do-il's only daughter

==== People around Bae Ok-sun ====
- Jeon No-min as Choi In-guk

In mid 50s, Bae Ok-sun's husband and the son of a prominent politician family. He is currently in the process of campaigning for parliamentary elections.

- Yoon Hyun-soo as Choi Jeong-hyeon

Bae Ok-sun's son.

==== UNI Home Shopping People ====
- Kim Jae-chul as Hyun-wook

In late 40s, the eldest son of UNI Group and president of UNI Home Shopping who has a polite and courteous personality.

- Jung Eui-jae as Seo Jun-beom

In mid 30s, a deputy general manager who has been in the company for 6 years.

- Moon Ji-in as Noh Seong-woo

A new PD of home shopping.

- Shim Wan-joon as Park Jong-soo

The team leader of a home shopping company.

- Shin Joo-ah as Go Eun-nara

A UNI home shopping show host

- Kim Do-yeon as Kim Soo-wan

The head of hair and makeup in the dressing room in home shopping.

- Kim Hyo-sun as Ahn An-na

UNI Home Shopping Fashion Team Product Planning, who is a popular MD and self-centered to own what she wants.

- Park So-eun as Im In-jin

The PD of home shopping.

- Yoo Jang-young as Shim Sang-chan

A shopping host with 2-3 years of experience, he is a savvy person who broadcasts almost all products in home shopping.

- Park Hee-jin as Noh Da-bi

A fashion person who once worked as a stylist, but after failing to appear on a fashion show once, she never had another chance to appear on a fashion show again. She is currently established in the food and daily necessities field.

==== Others ====
- Jeon Gook-hyang as Doil's Parent
- Han Soo-yeon as Ham Shin-ae

Hyun-wook's wife and the daughter of a famous chaebol family.

- Kim Hyun-wook as James, Gi Mo-ran's son, a young man in his twenties

=== Special appearance ===
- Jung A-mi as Wife of Hyun-wook, president of UNI Home Shopping, and mother of Shin-ae.
- Jung Won-kwan as Delivery man

== Production ==
On November 3, 2021, it was reported that Kim Ha-neul is considering to appear in the TV series a year after 18 Again. Lee Hye-young is appearing in TV series after 3 years, her last appearance was in tvN's 2018 TV series Lawless Lawyer. Park Eun-seok was first offered the role of Seo Jun-beom, a PD in home shopping company, which later went to Jung Eui-jae.

On January 14, 2022, the script reading site was revealed by releasing photos.

== Release ==
Kill Heel was originally scheduled to be released on February 23, 2022. However, the filming schedule changed due to the aftermath of COVID-19 confirmed at the filming site and the premiere date was postponed for two weeks to March 9, 2022. Kill Heel was originally organized as 16 episodes, ended with 14 episodes, due to internal organizational strategic reasons.

== Original soundtrack ==
Kill Heel

Soundtrack album by Various
- Released: 2022
- Genre: Soundtrack
- Languages: Korean; English
- Labels: Genie Music; Stone Music Entertainment

=== Part 1 ===
Released on March 17, 2022
No.	Title	Lyrics	Music	Artist	Length
1.	"That Night"	Jung Bom, Seol Gi-tae, Anais	TOP SNOW	Lee Da-young	3:27
2.	"That Night" (Inst.)		TOP SNOW		3:27
Total length:					6:54

=== Part 2 ===
Released on March 24, 2022
No.	Title	Lyrics	Music	Artist	Length
1.	"George"	Scarbrow Joshua James Henry, Anaisoluwatoyin Estelle Marinho, Scheller Oscar Benjamin Alexander	Scarbrow Joshua James Henry, Anais Oluwatoyinestelle Marerincar	Elaine	3:10
2.	"George" (Inst.)		Scarbrow Joshua James Henry, Anais Oluwatoyinestelle Marerincar		3:10
Total length:					6:20

=== Part 3 ===
Released on March 31, 2022
No.	Title	Lyrics	Music	Artist	Length
1.	"DEVILLL"	SNNNY, Joy Yang, Choi Byulbit	SNNNY	Hajin	2:47
2.	"DEVILLL" (Inst.)				2:47

=== Part 4 ===
Released on April 7, 2022
No.	Title	Lyrics	Music	Artist	Length
1.	"Dun Dun Dun"	Ki-Tae Seol, Hwan-Hee Cho, Anais	TOP SNOW	Solar (Mamamoo)	3:16
2.	"Dun Dun Dun" (Inst.)				3:16

=== Part 5 ===
Released on April 14, 2022
No.	Title	Lyrics	Music	Artist	Length
1.	"Can we fly like a bird"	Joy Yang, SNNNY	Yejune Synn (SNNNY)	Kim So-yeon	4:14
2.	"Can we fly like a bird" (Inst.)				4:14

=== Part 6 ===
Released on April 21, 2022
No.	Title	Lyrics	Music	Artist	Length
1.	"Losing Star"	KEHN	KEHN	Lee In	3:09
2.	"Losing Star" (Inst.)				3:09

== Viewership ==
Kill Heel : South Korea viewers per episode (thousands)

Season	Episode number														Average
Season	1	2	3	4	5	6	7	8	9	10	11	12	13	14	Average
1	1087	902	705	855	491	762	553	573	660	801	661	802	711	986	753

Source: Audience measurement performed nationwide by Nielsen Korea

Average TV viewership ratings
Ep.	Original broadcast date	Average audience share (Nielsen Korea)	
Ep.	Original broadcast date	Nationwide	Seoul
1	March 9, 2022	4.375% (1st)	4.604% (1st)
2	March 10, 2022	3.997% (2nd)	3.739% (2nd)
3	March 16, 2022	3.158% (2nd)	3.254% (2nd)
4	March 17, 2022	3.499% (2nd)	3.636% (2nd)
5	March 23, 2022	2.251% (2nd)	2.158% (3rd)
6	March 24, 2022	3.636% (2nd)	4.100% (2nd)
7	March 30, 2022	2.304% (2nd)	2.271% (2nd)
8	March 31, 2022	2.629% (2nd)	2.469% (2nd)
9	April 6, 2022	3.210% (2nd)	3.160% (2nd)
10	April 7, 2022	3.670% (2nd)	3.819% (2nd)
11	April 13, 2022	3.354% (2nd)	3.073% (2nd)
12	April 14, 2022	3.823% (2nd)	3.981% (2nd)
13	April 20, 2022	3.554% (2nd)	3.302% (2nd)
14	April 21, 2022	4.736% (2nd)	4.972% (2nd)
Average		3.442%	3.467%
In the table above, the blue numbers represent the lowest ratings and the red numbers represent the highest ratings.; This drama airs on a cable channel/pay TV which normally has a relatively smaller audience compared to free-to-air TV/public broadcasters (KBS, SBS, MBC and EBS).
