= Matrimonial Chaos =

2018 South Korean television series

- Promotional poster
- Hangul: 최고의 이혼
- Lit.: Best Divorce
- RR: Choegoui ihon
- MR: Ch'oegoŭi ihon
- Genre: Romantic comedy
- Written by: Moon Jung-min
- Directed by: Yoo Hyun-ki
- Starring: Cha Tae-hyun; Bae Doona; Lee El; Son Suk-ku
- Country of origin: South Korea
- Original language: Korean
- No. of episodes: 32 (Note: In order to circumvent Korean laws that prevent commercial breaks in the middle of an episode, what would previously have been aired as single 70 minute episodes are now being repackaged as two 35 minute episodes, with two episodes being shown each night with a commercial break between the two.)

Production
- Executive producers: Park Seong-hye; Na Jae-wook
- Camera setup: Single-camera
- Running time: 35 minutes
- Production companies: Monster Union; The I Entertainment

Original release
- Network: KBS2
- Release: October 8 – November 27, 2018

Matrimonial Chaos (Korean: 최고의 이혼; RR: Choegoui ihon) is a 2018 South Korean television series starring Cha Tae-hyun, Bae Doona, Lee El and Son Suk-ku. It is a remake of the 2013 Japanese TV series of the same title, broadcast by Fuji TV. It aired on KBS2 from October 8 to November 27, 2018, every Monday and Tuesday at 22:00 (KST).

== Synopsis ==
It explores the different thoughts of men and women in their thirties about love, marriage and family in a modern age when divorce is more common.

== Cast ==
=== Main ===
- Cha Tae-hyun as Jo Seok-moo (36 years old), a somehow stubborn husband who enjoys spending time alone.
- Bae Doona as Kang Hwi-roo (35 years old), opposite to her husband Seok-moo, she seems as an easygoing but self-centered and a sloppy woman, who prefers to take things at a slower pace.
- Lee El as Jin Yoo-young (36 years old), Jang-hyun's wife. She is an introvert, but reliable and a smart person. She is Seok-moo's first love.
- Son Suk-ku as Lee Jang-hyun (36 years old), a charismatic man who apparently is loved by many women, but in fact always feels alone.

=== Supporting ===
==== Seok-moo's family ====
- Moon Sook as Go Mi-sook (76 years old), Seok-moo's grandmother.
- Choi Jung-woo as Jo Koo-ho (64 years old), Seok-moo's father.
- Nam Gi-ae as Baek Mi-yeon (61 years old)
- Yoon Hye-kyung as Jo Seok-young (41 years old), Seok-moo's older sister.
- Jung Ji-soon as Go Myung-geun (45 years old), Seok-young's husband.
- Go Jae-won as Go Sung-bin (10 years old), Seok-young's child.

==== Hwi-roo's family ====
- Yoo Hyung-gwan as Kang Chu-wol (62 years old), Hwi-roo's father.
- Hwang Jung-min as Lee Jong-hee (59 years old), Hwi-roo's mother.
- Kim Hye-jun as Kang Ma-ru (29 years old), Hwi-roo's younger sister.
- Ha Yoon-kyung as Joo Soo-kyung (29 years old)

==== Others ====
- Wi Ha-joon as Im Shi-ho (29 years old)
- Shin Sung-min as Baek Chan-jin (29 years old)
- Song Ji-ho as Nam Dong-gu (28 years old)
- Kim Chae-eun as Song Mi-ri (28 years old)
- Seo Yoon-ah as Song Eun-joo (25 years old)
- Kim Ga-ran as Sung Na-kyung (27 years old)
- Choi Woo-ri as Yoo Ji-hyun (39 years old)
- Shin Song-min as Baek Min-seop (47 years old)
- Gong Sung-ha
- Lee Young-jin as Jang Se-jin
- Im Kang-sung as Chief Department
- Shim Eun-woo as So Se-jin (17 years old)

== Production ==
The first script reading of the cast was held on July 23, 2018 at KBS Annex Building.

== Original soundtrack ==
Matrimonial Chaos OST

Soundtrack album by Various artists
- Released: 2018
- Genre: Soundtrack
- Languages: Korean; English
- Labels: MUSIC&NEW, LEON KOREA

=== Part 1 ===
Released on October 8, 2018
No.	Title	Lyrics	Music	Artist	Length
1.	"Forgotten" (잊혀지는 것)	Kim Chang-gi	Kim Chang-gi	The Ade	04:20
2.	"Forgotten" (Inst.)		Kim Chang-gi		04:20
Total length:					08:40

=== Part 2 ===
Released on October 15, 2018
No.	Title	Lyrics	Music	Artist	Length
1.	"Maybe It's Too Late" (늦은 거겠지)	Park Sung-jin, Kwak Yoo-ni	Park Sung-jin	Wi Ha-joon	04:20
2.	"Maybe It's Too Late" (Inst.)		Park Sung-jin		04:20
Total length:					08:40

=== Part 3 ===
Released on October 22, 2018
No.	Title	Lyrics	Music	Artist	Length
1.	"Beautiful Day"	Zigzag Note	Zigzag Note, No Eun-jong	J_ust	03:41
2.	"Beautiful Day" (Inst.)		Zigzag Note, No Eun-jong		03:41
Total length:					07:22

=== Part 4 ===
Released on October 29, 2018
No.	Title	Lyrics	Music	Artist	Length
1.	"Hide And Seek" (숨바꼭질)	Lee Shin-sung, Zigzag Note	Zigzag Note	Tim	03:43
2.	"Hide And Seek" (Inst.)		Zigzag Note		03:43
Total length:					07:26

=== Part 5 ===
Released on November 5, 2018
No.	Title	Lyrics	Music	Artist	Length
1.	"Wish You Are" (좋겠다)	Zigzag Note, Kang Myeong-shin	Zigzag Note, Kim Myeong-sung	Apink BnN	04:01
2.	"Wish You Are" (Inst.)		Zigzag Note, Kim Myeong-sung		04:01
Total length:					08:02

=== Part 6 ===
Released on November 20, 2018
No.	Title	Lyrics	Music	Artist	Length
1.	"Near Parting" (이별근처)	Shim Hyun-bo	Choi Min-chang	Cha Tae-hyun	03:46
2.	"Near Parting" (Inst.)		Choi Min-chang		03:46
Total length:					07:32

== Ratings ==
Average TV viewership ratings (nationwide)
Ep.	Original broadcast date	Average audience share	
Ep.	Original broadcast date	TNmS	Nielsen Korea
1	October 8, 2018	N/A	3.2%
2	October 8, 2018	N/A	4.0%
3	October 9, 2018	3.3%	2.9%
4	October 9, 2018	4.0%	3.9%
5	October 15, 2018	2.9%	2.6%
6	October 15, 2018	3.1%	3.8%
7	October 16, 2018	N/A	2.6%
8	October 16, 2018	N/A	3.7%
9	October 22, 2018	N/A	3.3%
10	October 22, 2018	N/A	4.0%
11	October 23, 2018	N/A	3.1%
12	October 23, 2018	N/A	3.7%
13	October 29, 2018	N/A	1.9%
14	October 29, 2018	N/A	2.7%
15	October 30, 2018	N/A	2.3%
16	October 30, 2018	N/A	3.1%
17	November 5, 2018	3.2%	2.7%
18	November 5, 2018	3.6%	3.9%
19	November 6, 2018	3.0%	2.7%
20	November 6, 2018	3.4%	3.8%
21	November 13, 2018 (Note: No episodes were aired on November 12 due to the broadcast of KBO playoff baseball games. In return, four episodes were shown back-to-back on November 27.)	2.7%	3.3%
22	November 13, 2018	3.2%	4.1%
23	November 19, 2018	N/A	2.9%
24	November 19, 2018	2.7%	4.3%
25	November 20, 2018	N/A	3.3%
26	November 20, 2018	3.9%	4.5%
27	November 26, 2018	2.5%	2.2%
28	November 26, 2018	2.9%	3.7%
29	November 27, 2018	3.9%	3.3%
30	November 27, 2018	4.7%	4.0%
31	November 27, 2018	4.4%	4.1%
32	November 27, 2018	4.2%	4.4%
Average		— (Note: Due to some unpublished ratings, the exact average rating is unknown.)	3.4%
In the table above, the blue numbers represent the lowest ratings and the red numbers represent the highest ratings.; N/A denotes that the rating is not known.

== Awards and nominations ==
Year	Award	Category	Nominee	Result	Ref.
2018	2018 KBS Drama Awards	Top Excellence Award, Actor	Cha Tae-hyun	Won	
2018	2018 KBS Drama Awards	Top Excellence Award, Actress	Bae Doona	Nominated	
2018	2018 KBS Drama Awards	Excellence Award, Actor in a Miniseries	Cha Tae-hyun	Nominated	
2018	2018 KBS Drama Awards	Excellence Award, Actress in a Miniseries	Bae Doona	Nominated	
2018	2018 KBS Drama Awards	Excellence Award, Actress in a Miniseries	Lee El	Nominated	
2018	2018 KBS Drama Awards	Best New Actor	Son Suk-ku	Nominated	
2018	2018 KBS Drama Awards	Best Couple Award	Cha Tae-hyun and Bae Doona	Won	
2019	55th Baeksang Arts Awards	Best New Actor	Son Suk-ku	Nominated	
