= The Ghost Detective =

2018 South Korean television series

- Promotional poster
- Hangul: 오늘의 탐정
- Lit.: Today's Detective
- RR: Oneurui tamjeong
- MR: Onŭrŭi t'amjŏng
- Genre: Crime; Horror; Thriller; Mystery
- Created by: KBS Drama Division
- Written by: Han Ji-wan
- Directed by: Lee Jae-hoon
- Starring: Choi Daniel; Park Eun-bin; Lee Ji-ah
- Music by: Park Jun-oh
- Country of origin: South Korea
- Original language: Korean
- No. of episodes: 32 (Note: In order to circumvent Korean laws that prevent commercial breaks in the middle of an episode, what would previously have been aired as single 70 minute episodes are now being repackaged as two 35 minute episodes, with two episodes being shown each night with a commercial break between the two.)

Production
- Executive producers: Jung Ah-reum; Kim Seong-gon; Lee Gun-joon
- Producer: Yoon Jae-hyuk
- Camera setup: Single-camera
- Running time: 35 minutes
- Production companies: Beyond J; NK Mulsan

Original release
- Network: KBS2
- Release: September 5 – October 31, 2018

The Ghost Detective (Korean: 오늘의 탐정) is a 2018 South Korean television series starring Choi Daniel, Park Eun-bin and Lee Ji-ah. It aired on KBS2 from September 5 to October 31, 2018, every Wednesday and Thursday at 22:00 (KST).

== Synopsis ==
Detective Lee Da-il (Choi Daniel), who catches ghosts, tries to solve the case of his assistant, Jung Yeo-wool's (Park Eun-bin) younger sibling's bizarre death. He runs into a mysterious woman in red called Sunwoo Hye (Lee Ji-ah) who appears at every crime scene.

== Cast ==
=== Main ===
- Choi Daniel as Lee Da-il, a sharp and tenacious detective who displays his abilities only when he is investigating a case that interests him.
- Park Eun-bin as Jung Yeo-wool, a cheerful, persistent and strong assistant detective.
- Lee Ji-ah as Sunwoo Hye, a mysterious woman who always wears a red dress and carries both an innocent and spooky vibe with her.
  - Heo Jung-eun as young Sunwoo Hye

=== Supporting ===
- Kim Won-hae as Han Sang-seop, a local private investigator and chief of a detective agency.
- Lee Jae-kyun as Park Jung-dae, a smart and vigorous police detective.
- Lee Joo-young as Gil Chae-won, a medical examiner who has the ability to communicate with ghosts.
- Shin Jae-ha as Kim Gyeol
- Chae Ji-an as Jung Yi-rang
- Park Joo-hee as Baek Da-hee, a lawyer from a top firm.
- Yoo Su-bin as Kang Eun-jung, an aspiring journalist.
- Hyun Bong-sik as detective
- Ye Soo-jung as Da-il's mother
- Kim Min-sang as Detective Squad Chief Sim
- Mi Ram as Chan-mi, a kindergarten teacher.
- Woo Ki-hoon as Pil-seung
- Shin Cheol-jin as Grandpa's Ghost

== Production ==
- Early working title of the series is A Few Good Men (어퓨굿맨).
- First script reading was held in June 2018 at KBS Annex Building.

== Original soundtrack ==
The Ghost Detective OST

Soundtrack album by Various Artists
- Released: 2018
- Genre: Soundtrack
- Languages: Korean; English
- Labels: Stone Music Entertainment; Nyam Nyam Entertainment

=== Part 1 ===
Released on September 5, 2018
No.	Title	Lyrics	Music	Artist	Length
1.	"To You" (너에게)	Ji Hoon	Rocoberry	Park Na-rae (Spica)	3:15
2.	"To You" (Inst.)		Rocoberry		3:15
Total length:					6:30

=== Part 2 ===
Released on September 12, 2018
No.	Title	Lyrics	Music	Artist	Length
1.	"Twinkle" (빛나던)	Ji Hoon	Lee Seung-joo; Jang Ji-hye	Cha Ji-hye	3:44
2.	"Twinkle" (Inst.)		Lee Seung-joo; Jang Ji-hye		3:44
Total length:					7:28

=== Part 3 ===
Released on September 19, 2018
No.	Title	Lyrics	Music	Artist	Length
1.	"One Day" (하루)	Ji Hoon	Goo Hye-rim; Yoon Sung-joon; Lee Hyung-soon (Chansline)	Lee Bo-ram	3:45
2.	"One Day" (Inst.)		Goo Hye-rim; Yoon Sung-joon; Lee Hyung-soon (Chansline)		3:45
Total length:					7:30

=== Part 4 ===
Released on October 3, 2018
No.	Title	Lyrics	Music	Artist	Length
1.	"The Reason I Have Waited" (내가 기다리는 이유)	Ji Hoon	Ahn Young-min	Wheesung	2:52
2.	"The Reason I Have Waited" (Inst.)		Ahn Young-min		2:52
Total length:					5:44

=== Part 5 ===
Released on October 11, 2018
No.	Title	Lyrics	Music	Artist	Length
1.	"You, You, You" (그대 그대 그대)	Ji Hoon	Hwang Chan-hee	Yoon Mi-rae	3:50
2.	"You, You, You" (Inst.)		Hwang Chan-hee		3:50
Total length:					7:40

=== Part 6 ===
Released on October 18, 2018
No.	Title	Lyrics	Music	Artist	Length
1.	"Dream Me" (나라는 꿈)	Ji Hoon	Lee Seung-joo	Joy (Red Velvet), Mark (NCT)	3:25
2.	"Dream Me" (Inst.)		Lee Seung-joo		3:25
Total length:					6:50

== Ratings ==
Ep.	Broadcast date	Average audience share (nationwide)	
Ep.	Broadcast date	TNmS	Nielsen Korea
1	September 5, 2018	4.6%	3.7%
2	September 5, 2018	5.6%	4.4%
3	September 6, 2018	N/A	3.5%
4	September 6, 2018	N/A	4.0%
5	September 12, 2018	N/A	3.5%
6	September 12, 2018	N/A	3.6%
7	September 13, 2018	N/A	2.0%
8	September 13, 2018	N/A	2.7%
9	September 19, 2018	N/A	3.3%
10	September 19, 2018	N/A	3.8%
11	September 20, 2018	N/A	3.0%
12	September 20, 2018	N/A	3.3%
13	September 27, 2018 (Note: No episodes were aired on September 26 due to the broadcast of a Chuseok special.)	N/A	2.6%
14	September 27, 2018	N/A	2.6%
15	October 3, 2018	N/A	2.8%
16	October 3, 2018	N/A	2.7%
17	October 4, 2018	N/A	2.3%
18	October 4, 2018	N/A	2.2%
19	October 10, 2018	N/A	2.3%
20	October 10, 2018	N/A	2.2%
21	October 11, 2018	N/A	2.0%
22	October 11, 2018	N/A	2.2%
23	October 17, 2018	N/A	2.3%
24	October 17, 2018	N/A	2.3%
25	October 18, 2018	N/A	1.8%
26	October 18, 2018	N/A	2.0%
27	October 24, 2018	N/A	2.1%
28	October 24, 2018	N/A	2.1%
29	October 25, 2018	N/A	1.7%
30	October 25, 2018	N/A	1.9%
31	October 31, 2018	N/A	2.3%
32	October 31, 2018	N/A	2.1%
Average		— (Note: Due to some unpublished ratings, the exact average rating is unknown.)	2.67%
In the table above, the blue numbers represent the lowest published ratings and the red numbers represent the highest published ratings.; N/A denotes that the rating is not known.

== Awards and nominations ==
Year	Award	Category	Nominee	Result	Ref.
2018	2018 KBS Drama Awards	Excellence Award, Actor in a Miniseries	Choi Daniel	Won	
2018	2018 KBS Drama Awards	Excellence Award, Actress in a Miniseries	Park Eun-bin	Nominated	
2018	2018 KBS Drama Awards	Best Supporting Actor	Kim Won-hae	Won	
2018	2018 KBS Drama Awards	Best New Actress	Lee Joo-young	Nominated	
2018	2018 KBS Drama Awards	Best Young Actress	Heo Jung-eun	Nominated	
