= Jung Hye-in =

South Korean actress (born 1990)

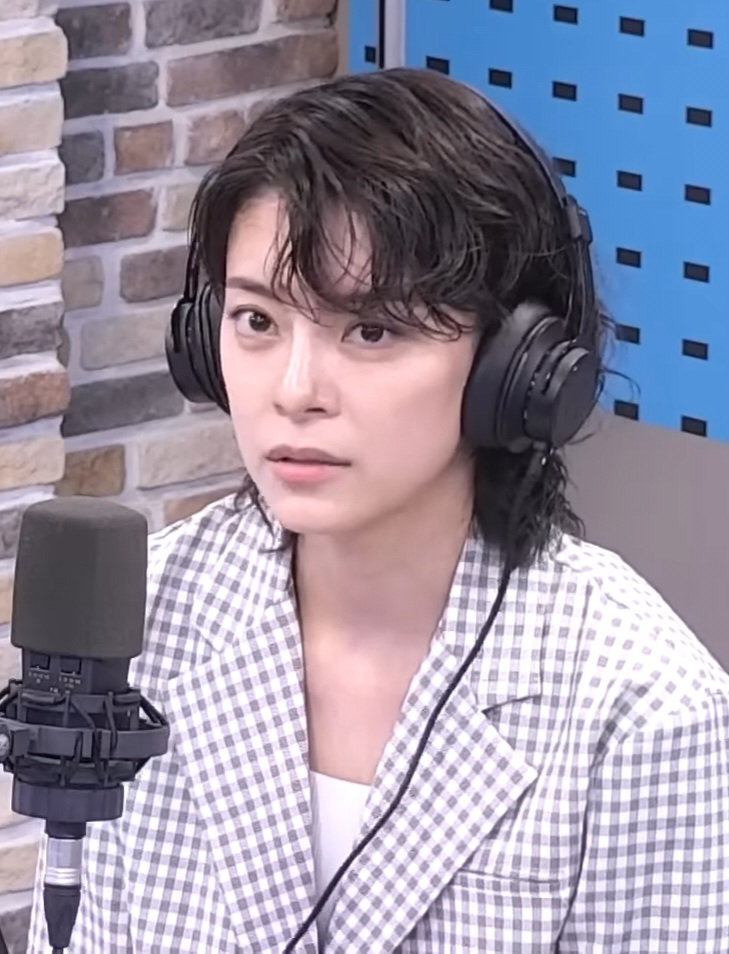
- Jung in 2023
- Born: September 20, 1990 (age 36); South Korea
- Occupation: Actress
- Years active: 2007–present
- Agent: Zen Entertainment

Korean name
- Hangul: 정혜인
- RR: Jeong Hyein
- MR: Chŏng Hyein

Jung Hye-in (Korean: 정혜인; born September 20, 1990) is a South Korean actress. She is known for her support role in various television series such as Doctor Stranger (2014), Healer (2014–2015), Jugglers (2017), Graceful Family (2019), and most recently in Sisyphus: The Myth (2021).

== Filmography ==
=== Film ===
| Year | Title | Role | Ref. |
|---|---|---|---|
| 2009 | A Blood Pledge | Herself | |
| 2014 | Futureless Things | Eun Young | |
| 2018 | Secret | Jin Kyung | |
| 2021 | Lady Gambler | Ozawa | |
| 2022 | Hidden | Jung Hae-soo | |
| 2023 | Always I am | Hwa-jong | |

=== Television series ===
| Year | Title | Role | Ref. |
|---|---|---|---|
| 2014 | Doctor Stranger | Nurse | |
| 2014–2015 | Healer | young Choi Myung-hee | |
| 2015 | Save the Family | Go Ye-won | |
| 2017 | Jugglers | Park Kyung-rye | |
| 2018 | Love to the End | Emily | |
| 2019 | Graceful Family | Lee Kyung-ah | |
| 2020 | Rugal | Song Mi-na | |
| 2021 | Sisyphus: The Myth | Kim Seo-jin / Kim Agnes | |

=== Web series ===
| Year | Title | Role | Ref. |
|---|---|---|---|
| 2022 | DMZ Daeseong-dong | Park Hyo-joo | |

=== Television show ===
| Year | Title | Role | Notes | Ref. |
|---|---|---|---|---|
| 2021–present | Goal Girl | Cast member | Season 1–3 | |
| 2024 | The Game of Queen Bee | Queen Bee | | |

=== Music video appearances ===
| Year | Title | Artist | Ref. |
|---|---|---|---|
| 2007 | "Memories Resembles Love" | Park Hyo-shin | |

== Awards and nominations ==
Name of the award ceremony, year presented, category, nominee of the award, and the result of the nomination
| Award ceremony | Year | Category | Nominee / Work | Result | Ref. |
|---|---|---|---|---|---|
| KBS Drama Awards | 2018 | Best New Actress | Love to the End | Nominated | |
| SBS Entertainment Awards | 2022 | Scene Stealer Award | Kick a Goal | Won | |
| SBS Entertainment Awards | 2024 | Top Excellence Award, Female | Kick a Goal | Won | |
