= Pure Love (2013 TV series) =

South Korean television series

- Official poster
- Hangul: 일말의 순정
- RR: Ilmarui Sunjeong
- MR: Ilmarŭi Sunjŏng
- Genre: Drama
- Starring: Lee Jae-ryong; Do Ji-won; Jeon Mi-seon; Kwon Ki-seon; Han Soo-yeon; Kim Tae-hoon
- Country of origin: South Korea
- Original language: Korean
- No. of episodes: 125

Production
- Executive producer: Lee Hwang-sun
- Running time: 35 minutes
- Production companies: HiCC Media; Art Korea Network

Original release
- Network: KBS2
- Release: February 18 – August 16, 2013

Pure Love (Korean: 일말의 순정) is a 2013 South Korean television series starring Lee Jae-ryong, Do Ji-won, Han Soo-yeon, Jeon Mi-seon, Kwon Ki-seon and Kim Tae-hoon. It aired on KBS2 on Mondays to Fridays at 19:45 for 125 episodes beginning February 18, 2013.

== Cast ==
=== Kim Sun-mi's family ===
- Jeon Mi-seon as Kim Sun-mi
  - Han Seung-yeon as young Sun-mi
- Kwon Ki-sun as Sun-mi's mother

=== Jung Woo-sung's family ===
- Kim Tae-hoon as Jung Woo-sung
  - Im Si-wan as young Woo-sung
- Ji Woo as Jung Soon-jung
- Park Ha-na as Jung Soon-jung's sister

=== Choi Min-soo's family ===
- Lee Jae-ryong as Choi Min-soo
  - G.O as young Min-soo
- Do Ji-won as Kang Soo-ji
- Song Ji-eun as young Soo-ji
- Lee Won-keun as Choi Joon-young

=== Fellow Teachers ===
- Seo Yi-sook as Ma Eun-hee
- Han Soo-yeon as Ha So-yun
- Lee Yoon-sang as Vice Principal
- Lee Sun-woo as Art Teacher
- Inati as PE Teacher

=== Soon-jung's friends ===
- Oh Kwang-suk as Oh Pil-dok
- Jo Woo-ri as Go Da-bi

=== Joon-young's friends ===
- Jin Woo as Jin-woo
- Kim Woo-ram as Park Chi-gi

=== Others ===
- Lee Hoon as Ha Jung-woo
  - Kim Sung-kyu as young Jung-woo
- Kang Dong-hwa as Dong-hwa
- Son Ho-young as Son Dae-ri
- Ham Sung-min as Student

=== Cameo appearances ===
- Narsha as Ha Soo-bin (ep 7)
- Onew as Choi Joon-young's cousin (ep 59)
- Brave Brothers as famous music producer
- Son Dam-bi as barista
- Kim Tae-woo as Jung Woo-chul
- Kim Sung-won as Jung Woo-chul's driver
- Kim Ye-won as PE Student Teacher (Woo-sung's crush)
- Kim Dae-sung as Astrologer
- Kim Min-jong as Kim Ji-kwang
- Yoon Hae-yoon
- Big Star as Pil-dok's friends
