= Choi Daniel =

South Korean actor

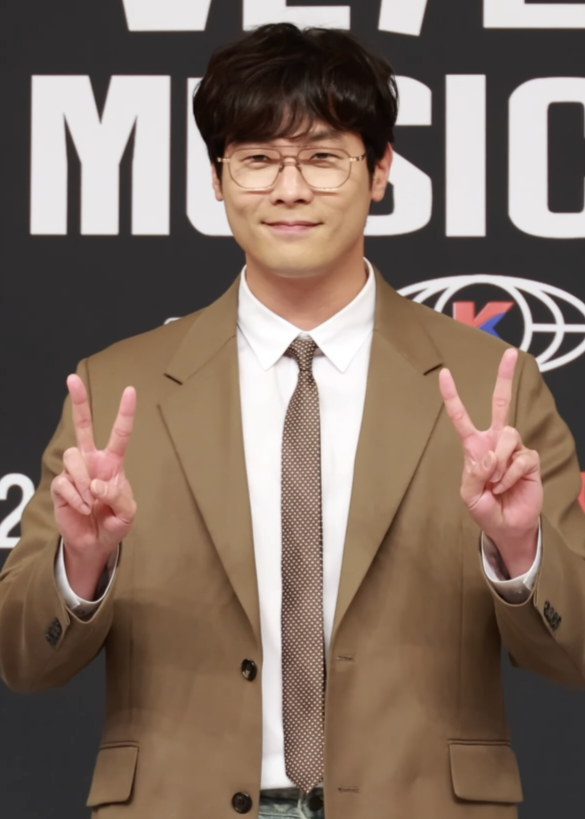
- Choi in November 2025
- Born: 22 February 1986 (age 40); Gangdong District, Seoul, South Korea
- Education: Chungwoon University
- Occupation: Actor
- Years active: 2005–present
- Agent: Star Road Company

Korean name
- Hangul: 최다니엘
- RR: Choe Daniel
- MR: Ch'oe Taniel

Choi Daniel (born 22 February 1986) is a South Korean actor, DJ and model. He is best known for his television roles in The Ghost Detective, Jugglers, High Kick Through the Roof, Baby Faced Beauty, School 2013, and rom-com film Cyrano Agency. He is also an anchorman on KBS World Radio since 2011 and a DJ on KBS 2FM since 2013.

== Early life ==
Choi's mother had serious morning sickness when pregnant with his elder brother (6 years his elder), thus did not consider having a second child. His father had a vasectomy, but Choi was still conceived. His father wanted to name him Solomon, but his mother preferred Daniel, as he was considered a gift from God.

As a child, his name was considered unusual, and his peers would call him "Yogi Daniel" (a famous yoga master and contortionist), and would jokingly ask him to squeeze himself into a desk.

Choi's mother died when he was 5 years old. Due to few recollections of his mother, later in life, he found it difficult to act opposite his characters' mother figures. After the death of his mother and his father's business went bankrupt, he was sent to his aunt's house, while his father and brother lived with another relative.

His first part-time job in high school was a gas station attendant.

He quit after one semester at the Broadcasting and Acting Department of Chungwoon University, as he had enough of the experience. He was part of the university's cheerleading team.

His father was in the Military Academy and his brother is a civil servant.

== Conscription ==
On 2 October 2015, Choi enlisted in the Republic of Korea Army to serve his mandatory military service. Due to a knee injury he suffered in late 2012 while shooting the drama School 2013, he was deemed unfit for physical duty. As alternative military duty, after four weeks of training, he was assigned to serve at the Seoul VHS Medical Center as a public service worker.

On 27 June 2017, he was the recipient of model public service worker commissioner's award from the Military Manpower Administration at the Seoul Regional Office of the MMA, for being a model employee and sincere work ethic.

His original discharge date, 1 October 2017, was advanced 2 days due to the Chuseok holidays. His first project afterwards was Jugglers. His brother got married when he was filming the drama.

== Filmography ==
=== Film ===
Year	Title	Role	Notes	Ref.
2009	Yoga Hakwon	Dong-hoon		
2010	Cyrano Agency	Lee Sang-yong		
2011	Age of Milk		short film	
2012	The Traffickers	Sang-ho		
2012	The Peach Tree		cameo	
2013	11 A.M.	Ji-wan		
2014	The Con Artists	art gallery owner	cameo	
2015	The Chronicles of Evil	Kim Jin-gyu		
2015	Untouchable Lawmen	Detective Jo Yoo-min		
2017	Lying is Truth		short film	
2019	The Beast	Jong-chan		

=== Television series ===
Year	Title	Role	Notes	Ref.
2000	School Stories			
2005	Golden Apple			
2008	Worlds Within	Yang Soo-kyung		
2008	General Hospital 2		guest	
2009	Good Job, Good Job	Lee Eun-hyeok		
2009	High Kick Through the Roof	Lee Ji-hoon		
2010	Once Upon a Time in Saengchori		cameo	
2011	Baby Faced Beauty	Choi Jin-Wook		
2011	The Musical	Hong Jae-Yi		
2011	High Kick: Revenge of the Short Legged	Ji-hoon	Cameo (episode 95)	
2012	Ji Woon-soo's Stroke of Luck	Kim Daniel	cameo	
2012	Phantom	Park Gi-young / Hades	Cameo (episode 1-2, 6)	
2013	School 2013	Kang Se-chan		
2013	KBS Drama Special – "Waiting for Love"	Cha Ki-dae	one act-drama	
2014	Big Man	Kang Dong-seok		
2015	Heart to Heart	bakeshop owner	Cameo	
2017	Jugglers	Nam Chi-won		
2018	The Ghost Detective	Lee Da-il		
2019	My Fellow Citizens!	Newly-wed	Cameo, (episode 11)	
2020	It's Okay to Not Be Okay	CEO Choi Daniel	Cameo (episode 8)	
2022	Today's Webtoon	Seok Ji-hyung		
2022	Fly High Butterfly	Kwang Soo		

=== Web series ===
Year	Title	Role	Ref.
2023	Mask Girl	Park Gi-hun	

=== Television shows ===
Year	Title	Role	Notes	Ref.
2025	Running Man	Cast member	Episode 736 & 742 (guest member); Episode 747-781 (rental member)	

=== Music video appearances ===
- "Coin Laundry" (Wax, 2014)
- "Open The Door" (Im Chang-jung, 2013)
- "Love Ballad" (Brown Eyed Soul, 2010)
- "Turn It Up" (Sung Hyun-ah, 2004)

=== Radio ===
- KBS World Radio - News Plus (2011~present)
- KBS 2FM - Pops Pops (2013~present)
- Radio Apart (30 Nov, 2018)

== Discography ==
- "I went to Cheonggyesan Mt." - duet with Uhm Tae-woong, Cyrano Agency OST

== Awards and nominations ==
Name of the award ceremony, year presented, category, nominee of the award, and the result of the nomination
Award ceremony	Year	Category	Nominee / Work	Result	Ref.
Baeksang Arts Awards	2010	Best New Actor – Television	High Kick Through the Roof	Nominated	
Baeksang Arts Awards	2011	Best New Actor – Film	Cyrano Agency	Nominated	
Blue Dragon Film Awards	2010	Best New Actor	Cyrano Agency	Nominated	
Grand Bell Awards	2010	Best New Actor	Cyrano Agency	Nominated	
Grand Bell Awards	2012	Best New Actor	The Traffickers	Nominated	
KBS Drama Awards	2011	Excellence Award, Actor in a Miniseries	Baby Faced Beauty	Won	
KBS Drama Awards	2012	Excellence Award, Actor in a Miniseries	School 2013	Nominated	
KBS Drama Awards	2013	Best Actor in a One-act Drama/Special	Waiting for Love	Won	
KBS Drama Awards	2014	Excellence Award, Actor in a Miniseries	Big Man	Nominated	
KBS Drama Awards	2018	Excellence Award, Actor in a Miniseries	Jugglers, The Ghost Detective	Won	
KBS Drama Awards	2018	Best Couple	Choi Daniel (with Baek Jin-hee); Jugglers	Won	
KBS Drama Awards	2018	Best Couple	Choi Daniel (with Park Eun-bin); The Ghost Detective	Nominated	
KBS Drama Awards	2018	Netizen Award	Jugglers, The Ghost Detective	Nominated	
Korean Film Awards	2010	Best New Actor	Cyrano Agency	Nominated	
MBC Entertainment Awards	2009	Best New Actor in a Sitcom/Comedy	High Kick Through the Roof	Won	
MBC Entertainment Awards	2024	Best Entertainer Award (Reality)	Omniscient Interfering View	Won	
Puchon International Fantastic Film Festival	2011	Fantasia Award	High Kick Through the Roof	Won	
SBS Drama Awards	2022	Top Excellence Award, Actor in a Miniseries Romance/Comedy Drama	Today's Webtoon	Nominated	
