= Love to the End =

2018 South Korean television series

- Promotional poster
- Hangul: 끝까지 사랑
- RR: Kkeutkkaji sarang
- MR: Kkŭtkkaji sarang
- Genre: Family; Melodrama
- Created by: KBS Drama Production
- Written by: Lee Sun-Hee
- Directed by: Shin Chang-Seok
- Starring: Lee Young-ah; Hong Soo-ah; Kang Eun-tak; Shim Ji-ho
- Music by: Lee Chang-hee
- Country of origin: South Korea
- Original language: Korean
- No. of episodes: 104 (Note: Originally scheduled to air for 100 episodes, the series was extended by four episodes in lieu of 12 pre-empts.)

Production
- Executive producers: Choi Hyuk-jin; Hwang Eui-kyung; Kwak Hong-suk; Oh Sung-min
- Producer: Sung Jun-hye
- Camera setup: Single camera
- Running time: 35 minutes
- Production companies: GnG Production; Take 2 Media Group

Original release
- Network: KBS2
- Release: July 23 – December 31, 2018

Love to the End (Korean: 끝까지 사랑; RR: Kkeutkkaji sarang) is a 2018 South Korean television series starring Lee Young-ah, Hong Soo-ah, Kang Eun-tak, and Shim Ji-ho. The series aired on KBS2 from Monday to Friday from 7:50 p.m. to 8:30 p.m. (KST) starting July 23, 2018.

== Cast ==
=== Main ===
- Lee Young-ah as Han Ga-young
- Hong Soo-ah as Kang Se-na
- Kang Eun-tak as Yoon Jung-han
- Shim Ji-ho as Kang Hyun-ki

=== Supporting ===
- Jung Hye-in as Emily
- Han Ki-woong as Park Jae-dong
- Lee Kyung-jin as Lee Jung-in
- Kim Ha-kyun as Han Soo-chang
- Lee Eung-kyung as Seo Mi-soon
- Park Gwang-hyun as Han Doo-young
  - Lee Do-hyung as child Doo-young
- Han Ki-woong as Park Jae-dong
- Lee Min-ji as Jang Hae-ri
- Kim Il-woo as Kang Je-hyeok
- Bae Do-hwan as Choi Man-sik
- Jung So-young as Yoon Jung-bin
- Nam Gi-ae as Ha Young-ok
- Park Ji-il as Yoon Sang-min
- Kim Tae-gyeom as Choi Deok-bae
- Carson Allen as loan shark
- Jeon Se-hyun as Se-na's mother
- Lee Se-rang as Cosmetic store owner
- Ahn Seung-hun as CEO Jung
- Eun Hae-seong as Kei
- Song Min-jae as Han Yoon-Soo
- Lee A-ra as Han Song-Yi
- Choi Cheol-ho as Manager Baek Chul
- Na Seok-min as Baek's subordinate
- Kang Pil-sun as man pulls piece of hair from Yoon-soo
- Jang Eui-don as Creditor
- Seo Kwang-jae as Judge
- Lee Myung-ho as CEO Jung's lawyer
- Kwak Na-yeon as Helper
- Jang Chul-soon as Reporter
- Kim Nam-ho as Police Officer
- Daniel Joey Albright as Police Officer Randy (ep.10)
- Jo Jae-wan
- Kim Young-ah
- Choi Young
- Maeng Bong-hak
- Seo Dong-suk
- Lee Ye-won
- Kim Sung-gon
- Lee Seung-joon
- Shin In-a

== Ratings ==
- In this table, the blue numbers represent the lowest ratings and the red numbers represent the highest ratings.
- NR denotes that the drama did not rank in the top 20 daily programs on that date.
- N/A denotes that the rating is not known.

Ep.	Original broadcast date	Average audience share			
Ep.	Original broadcast date	TNmS Ratings		AGB Nielsen	
Ep.	Original broadcast date	Nationwide	Seoul	Nationwide	Seoul
1	July 23, 2018	12.5%	7.9%	9.6% (5th)	9.0% (5th)
2	July 24, 2018	11.9%	7.2%	8.8% (4th)	7.8% (6th)
3	July 25, 2018	11.5%	6.7%	8.3% (6th)	6.8% (12th)
4	July 26, 2018	10.8%	5.9%	9.2% (5th)	8.5% (6th)
5	July 27, 2018	12.2%	7.5%	8.4% (10th)	7.4% (10th)
6	July 30, 2018	11.6%	6.7%	9.8% (5th)	8.8% (7th)
7	July 31, 2018	11.7%	7.0%	8.9% (5th)	8.6% (5th)
8	August 1, 2018	11.3%	6.5%	8.1% (6th)	6.7% (10th)
9	August 2, 2018	9.8%	4.9%	8.0% (5th)	6.7% (10th)
10	August 3, 2018	9.5%	4.4%	8.6% (8th)	7.5% (11th)
11	August 6, 2018	10.4%	5.6%	10.4% (5th)	8.9% (6th)
12	August 7, 2018	12.0%	7.3%	8.9% (6th)	7.5% (8th)
13	August 8, 2018	11.6%	6.8%	9.3% (5th)	8.4% (5th)
14	August 9, 2018	12.3%	7.6%	9.7% (5th)	9.1% (5th)
15	August 10, 2018	12.5%	8.1%	10.0% (5th)	8.5% (10th)
16	August 13, 2018	11.7%	7.2%	9.8% (5th)	9.1% (6th)
17	August 14, 2018	11.6%	7.0%	9.2% (5th)	8.4% (6th)
18	August 15, 2018	9.7%	4.9%	8.4% (7th)	7.6% (10th)
19	August 16, 2018	13.0%	8.4%	10.0% (4th)	8.8% (5th)
20	August 17, 2018	12.7%	8.0%	9.3% (7th)	7.9% (9th)
21	August 20, 2018 (Note: Aired earlier than usual due to coverage of the 2018 Asian Games in Jakarta and Palembang.)	7.1%	2.3%	4.0% (NR)	3.7% (NR)
22	August 22, 2018 (Note: No episodes were aired on August 21, 23, 24, 27, 30 and 31 due to coverage of the 2018 Asian Games in Jakarta and Palembang.)	11.6%	6.9%	9.4% (5th)	8.6% (5th)
23	August 28, 2018	11.9%	7.4%	9.7% (6th)	9.2% (6th)
24	August 29, 2018	11.5%	6.8%	9.3% (8th)	8.0% (12th)
25	September 3, 2018	15.2%	—N/a	10.6% (5th)	9.5% (7th)
26	September 4, 2018	14.6%	—N/a	10.8% (4th)	9.6% (5th)
27	September 5, 2018	13.6%	—N/a	10.8% (4th)	9.1% (5th)
28	September 6, 2018	14.2%	—N/a	11.0% (3rd)	9.0% (4th)
29	September 7, 2018	12.8%	—N/a	9.9% (9th)	8.2% (9th)
30	September 10, 2018	12.8%	—N/a	11.7% (3rd)	10.6% (5th)
31	September 12, 2018 (Note: No episode was aired on September 11 due to coverage of a soccer match between South Korea and Chile.)	—N/a	—N/a	11.5% (3rd)	9.9% (3rd)
32	September 13, 2018	13.4%	—N/a	11.0% (3rd)	8.9% (5th)
33	September 14, 2018	—N/a	—N/a	11.1% (5th)	9.0% (8th)
34	September 17, 2018	13.7%	—N/a	10.6% (4th)	9.0% (7th)
35	September 18, 2018	13.4%	—N/a	10.3% (3rd)	9.1% (4th)
36	September 19, 2018	12.9%	—N/a	10.8% (2nd)	9.6% (2nd)
37	September 20, 2018	13.5%	—N/a	11.2% (3rd)	10.1% (3rd)
38	September 21, 2018	12.6%	—N/a	11.6% (6th)	10.0% (7th)
39	September 26, 2018 (Note: No episodes were aired on September 24 due to the broadcast of the movie Guardians of the Galaxy, and on September 25 due to the broadcast of the movie Transformers: The Last Knight.)	12.2%	—N/a	9.6% (6th)	8.3% (8th)
40	September 27, 2018	14.8%	—N/a	11.3% (3rd)	10.2% (4th)
41	September 28, 2018	14.1%	—N/a	11.8% (4th)	10.1% (6th)
42	October 1, 2018	16.0%	—N/a	12.2% (3rd)	10.7% (3rd)
43	October 2, 2018	15.9%	—N/a	12.4% (3rd)	10.9% (3rd)
44	October 3, 2018	—N/a	—N/a	12.4% (3rd)	10.3% (3rd)
45	October 4, 2018	—N/a	—N/a	12.0% (3rd)	10.3% (4th)
46	October 5, 2018	—N/a	—N/a	12.6% (4th)	10.5% (7th)
47	October 8, 2018	14.8%	—N/a	12.4% (3rd)	11.0% (3rd)
48	October 9, 2018	16.4%	—N/a	13.7% (2nd)	11.7% (3rd)
49	October 10, 2018	16.6%	—N/a	12.1% (3rd)	10.0% (4th)
50	October 11, 2018	15.7%	—N/a	12.3% (2nd)	10.5% (3rd)
51	October 12, 2018	14.8%	—N/a	11.5% (4th)	9.4% (6th)
52	October 15, 2018	17.5%	—N/a	13.1% (3rd)	11.1% (3rd)
53	October 16, 2018	16.7%	—N/a	12.9% (2nd)	10.8% (4th)
54	October 17, 2018	17.5%	—N/a	12.7% (3rd)	11.3% (3rd)
55	October 18, 2018	18.0%	—N/a	14.4% (2nd)	12.7% (2nd)
56	October 19, 2018	17.2%	—N/a	12.2% (3rd)	9.8% (4th)
57	October 22, 2018	17.6%	—N/a	12.8% (3rd)	10.6% (3rd)
58	October 23, 2018	17.6%	—N/a	13.3% (2nd)	11.8% (2nd)
59	October 24, 2018	19.1%	—N/a	14.6% (2nd)	12.4% (3rd)
60	October 25, 2018	19.3%	—N/a	13.8% (2nd)	12.4% (2nd)
61	October 26, 2018	19.8%	—N/a	14.5% (2nd)	12.5% (5th)
62	October 29, 2018	19.1%	—N/a	15.3% (2nd)	12.9% (3rd)
63	October 30, 2018	18.6%	—N/a	14.3% (2nd)	12.0% (2nd)
64	November 1, 2018 (Note: No episodes were aired on October 31, November 7 and 12 due to the broadcast of KBO playoff baseball games.)	19.4%	—N/a	15.3% (2nd)	13.9% (2nd)
65	November 2, 2018	18.2%	—N/a	13.9% (2nd)	11.9% (5th)
66	November 5, 2018	17.0%	—N/a	13.9% (2nd)	12.4% (3rd)
67	November 6, 2018	18.7%	—N/a	15.7% (2nd)	13.4% (2nd)
68	November 8, 2018	—N/a	—N/a	14.9% (2nd)	12.9% (2nd)
69	November 9, 2018	—N/a	—N/a	13.0% (2nd)	11.5% (4th)
70	November 13, 2018	19.7%	—N/a	14.2% (2nd)	13.1% (3rd)
71	November 14, 2018	19.0%	—N/a	14.1% (2nd)	12.4% (2nd)
72	November 15, 2018	19.6%	—N/a	14.9% (2nd)	13.9% (2nd)
73	November 16, 2018	19.6%	—N/a	14.6% (2nd)	12.6% (4th)
74	November 19, 2018	19.9%	—N/a	13.9% (3rd)	12.2% (3rd)
75	November 20, 2018	17.1%	—N/a	13.7% (4th)	11.8% (3rd)
76	November 21, 2018	19.4%	—N/a	15.3% (2nd)	13.6% (2nd)
77	November 22, 2018	20.0%	—N/a	14.8% (2nd)	13.1% (2nd)
78	November 23, 2018	18.8%	—N/a	14.9% (3rd)	13.4% (2nd)
79	November 26, 2018	20.1%	—N/a	14.7% (2nd)	13.2% (2nd)
80	November 27, 2018	20.3%	—N/a	15.1% (2nd)	13.3% (3rd)
81	November 28, 2018	20.9%	—N/a	14.3% (2nd)	12.9% (2nd)
82	November 29, 2018	19.4%	—N/a	15.0% (2nd)	13.9% (2nd)
83	November 30, 2018	19.3%	—N/a	15.0% (2nd)	13.6% (2nd)
84	December 3, 2018	20.0%	—N/a	15.7% (2nd)	14.0% (2nd)
85	December 4, 2018	19.4%	—N/a	15.3% (2nd)	12.9% (2nd)
86	December 5, 2018	19.6%	—N/a	14.7% (2nd)	13.0% (2nd)
87	December 6, 2018	20.1%	—N/a	14.4% (2nd)	12.6% (2nd)
88	December 7, 2018	—N/a	—N/a	14.4% (2nd)	12.7% (4th)
89	December 10, 2018	16.9%	—N/a	14.7% (2nd)	13.6% (2nd)
90	December 11, 2018	18.6%	—N/a	15.1% (2nd)	13.1% (2nd)
91	December 12, 2018	21.2%	—N/a	14.9% (2nd)	12.5% (2nd)
92	December 13, 2018	20.1%	—N/a	15.2% (2nd)	13.5% (3rd)
93	December 14, 2018	19.9%	—N/a	13.5% (2nd)	11.7% (5th)
94	December 17, 2018	20.2%	—N/a	14.9% (2nd)	12.8% (2nd)
95	December 18, 2018	19.3%	—N/a	15.1% (2nd)	13.3% (2nd)
96	December 19, 2018	19.2%	—N/a	14.9% (2nd)	13.5% (3rd)
97	December 20, 2018	19.3%	—N/a	14.0% (3rd)	12.1% (4th)
98	December 21, 2018	19.8%	—N/a	14.8% (2nd)	13.2% (4th)
99	December 24, 2018	19.6%	—N/a	15.0% (2nd)	14.2% (2nd)
100	December 25, 2018	20.6%	—N/a	16.0% (2nd)	14.8% (2nd)
101	December 26, 2018	20.8%	—N/a	15.8% (3rd)	14.3% (3rd)
102	December 27, 2018	20.7%	—N/a	15.2% (3rd)	13.7% (4th)
103	December 28, 2018	20.1%	—N/a	16.4% (2nd)	15.3% (2nd)
104	December 31, 2018	16.7%	—N/a	14.1% (2nd)	12.8% (2nd)
Average		-	-	12.44%	10.92%

== Awards and nominations ==
Year	Award	Category	Recipient	Result	Ref.
2018	2018 KBS Drama Awards	Excellence Award, Actor in a Daily Drama	Kang Eun-tak	Won	
2018	2018 KBS Drama Awards	Excellence Award, Actor in a Daily Drama	Shim Ji-ho	Nominated	
2018	2018 KBS Drama Awards	Excellence Award, Actress in a Daily Drama	Lee Young-ah	Nominated	
2018	2018 KBS Drama Awards	Excellence Award, Actress in a Daily Drama	Hong Soo-ah	Nominated	
2018	2018 KBS Drama Awards	Best New Actress	Jung Hye-in	Nominated	
