= Hong Soo-ah =

South Korean actress

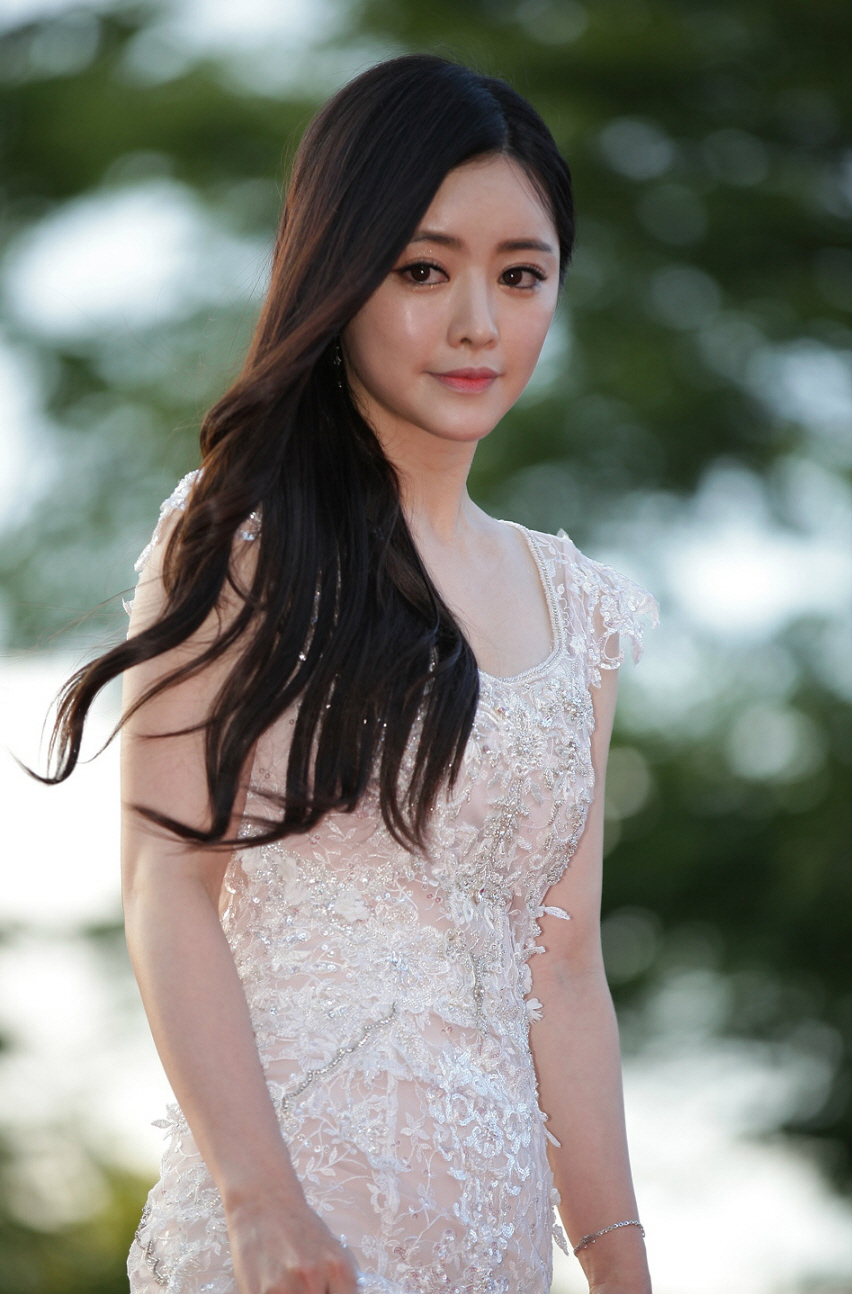
- Hong in July 2015
- Born: June 30, 1986 (age 40); Hwaseong, Gyeonggi, South Korea
- Education: Konkuk University - Film Art
- Occupation: Actress
- Years active: 2003–present
- Agent: Tazo Entertainment

Korean name
- Hangul: 홍근영
- RR: Hong Geunyeong
- MR: Hong Kŭnyŏng

Stage name
- Hangul: 홍수아
- RR: Hong Sua
- MR: Hong Sua

Hong Soo-ah (Korean: 홍수아; born June 30, 1986), birth name Hong Geun-young (홍근영), is a South Korean actress. She is known for her early 2000s role in the sitcom Nonstop.

She gained the nickname "Hong Throw" in the Korean press after making a skilful ceremonial first pitch at a Doosan Bears game in Jamsil Baseball Stadium in 2005.

Hong Soo-ah has performed in a number of films and television programs and appeared on variety shows. She left Korea to perform in Chinese dramatic roles for several years before returning to Korea in 2016 to play a lead role in the film Malice.

== Career ==
In 2015 the actress won the Asia Pacific Actors Network Hallyu Star award.

In June 2020, Hong signed a management contract with Glovic Entertainment, the same company behind the Channel A drama Eccentric! Chef Moon.

In October 2022, Hong signed a contract with Tazo Entertainment.

== Filmography ==
=== Film ===
| Year | Title | Role |
|---|---|---|
| 2003 | Wishing Stairs | Member of the sculpture club |
| 2003 | My Wife Is a Gangster 2 | Joong-hee |
| 2004 | Face | Jo Hye-ran |
| 2005 | She's on Duty | Jo Hye-ryung |
| 2013 | Mango Tree | Su-jin |
| 2014 | Haunted Road | Xue-lien |
| 2015 | Malice | Choi Ga-in |
| 2017 | The Spectator | Chen-tong |
| 2017 | Reverse: the Age of Rebellion | Yoon Seo Young |
| 2018 | The Bystander | Chen Tong |
| 2022 | Days of Impression | Bo-young |
| TBA | Butterfly Effect | Joo-yeon / Hae-yeon |

=== Television series ===
| Year | Title | Role |
|---|---|---|
| 2004 | Nonstop 5 | Hong Soo-ah |
| 2005 | Master of the Work | Soo-ah |
| 2006 | MBC Best Theater: "My Problematic Girl" | So-jin |
| 2006 | The 101st Proposal | Han Geum-jung |
| 2007 | Heaven & Earth | Yoon Eun-ha |
| 2008 | My Precious You | Baek Jae-ra |
| 2009 | Cho-geon-bang | |
| 2011 | I Trusted Him | Ha Jung-min |
| 2012 | KBS Drama Special: "The True Colors of Gang and Cheol" | Mi-kang |
| 2012 | Dream of the Emperor | Yeon-hwa |
| 2015 | Billion Dollar Heir | Lu Huan-er |
| 2015 | Two Families from Wenzhou | Choi Hyojin |
| 2015–2016 | 1 km Between You & Me | Shin Hae-ra |
| 2018 | Love to the End | Kang Se-na |
| 2020 | Phoenix 2020 | Lee Ji-eun |

=== Television show ===
| Year | Title | Notes |
|---|---|---|
| 2004 | M.net Show King | |
| 2005–2006 | Show! Music Core | Host |
| 2010–2011 | Heroes | Cast Member |
| 2011 | Dream Project: A Miracle Can Happen to You | |
| 2012 | TV Animal Farm | |
| 2012 | Law of the Jungle W | Cast Member |
| 2014 | Somewhere Along the Way: Hong Soo-ah and Dave's Wonderful Day in the Czech Republic | Host |
| 2016 | Saturday Night Live Korea | Host |
| 2016 | Hong Soo-ah's Korea Travel Guide | Travel show host |
| 2017 | I Love to Go Crazy | |
| 2019 | Law of the Jungle in Myanmar and Myeik | Cast Member |
| 2021 | Reckless Commerce | Host |
| 2022 | Beauty and Booty 7 | Host |
| 2022–present | Goal Girl | Cast Member; Season 3 |
| 2023 | Tomorrow's Winning Shot | Player |

=== Web shows ===
| Year | Title | Role | Ref. |
|---|---|---|---|
| 2017 | Beauty Land and Beauty Island | Beauty show host | |

=== Music video appearances ===
| Year | Song title | Artist |
|---|---|---|
| 2004 | "Because You're Pretty" | Shinnago |
| 2005 | "No Farewells" | Hong Soo-ah |
| 2010 | "Hey Mister" | ALi |
| 2011 | "Dear Feelings, Dear Heart" | BoM |
| 2016 | "Distance" | Hong Soo-ah and Kim Woo-joo |
| 2017 | "Mohae (What's Up?)" | San E |

== Musical theatre ==
| Year | Title | Role |
|---|---|---|
| 2009 | Really Really Like You | Oh Jung-hwa |

== Awards and nominations ==
| Award | Year | Category | Nominated work | Result |
|---|---|---|---|---|
| Asia Model Awards | 2016 | Asia Star Actress Award | —N/a | Won |
| 4th APAN Star Awards | 2015 | Hallyu Star Award | —N/a | Won |
| KBS Drama Awards | 2018 | Excellence Award, Actress in a Daily Drama | Love to the End | Nominated |
| Korea Best Star Awards | 2019 | Hallyu Star | —N/a | Won |
| MBC Entertainment Awards | 2005 | Best Dressed | —N/a | Won |
| SBS Drama Awards | 2020 | Top Excellence Award, Actress in a Mid/Long-length Drama | Phoenix 2020 | Nominated |
