= Han Soo-yeon =

South Korean actress (born 1983)

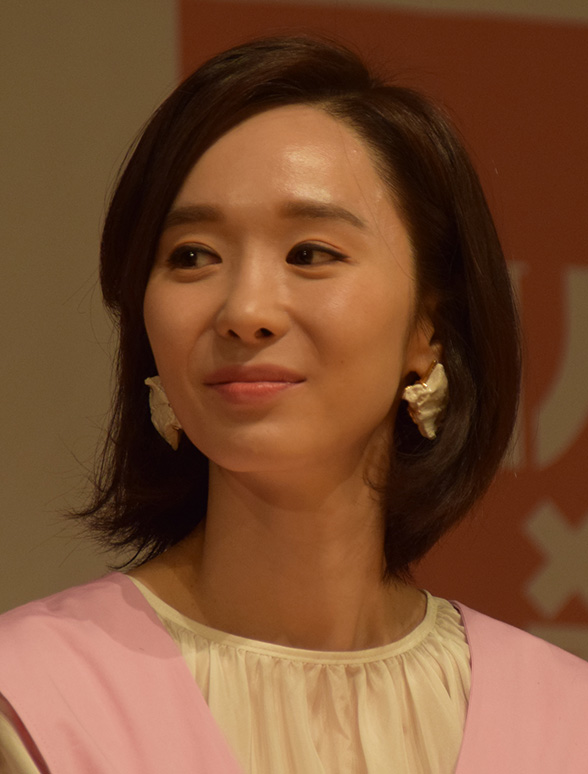
- Han in 2019
- Born: April 24, 1983 (age 43); Cheongju, Chungcheongbuk-do, South Korea
- Education: Sungkyunkwan University
- Occupation: Actress
- Agent: Steit Entertainment

Korean name
- Hangul: 한수연
- RR: Han Suyeon
- MR: Han Suyŏn

Han Soo-yeon (Korean: 한수연; born April 24, 1983) is a South Korean actress best known for her roles in Korean dramas, Pure Love (2013) and Love in the Moonlight (2016).

== Early life and education ==
Han was born in Cheongju, South Korea, and moved with her mother and sister to Budapest, Hungary in 1990, where her mother studied classical singing at the Franz Liszt Academy of Music. She began primary school in Budapest and learned to speak Hungarian fluently. The family moved back to South Korea in 1998. She then studied at Sungkyunkwan University, and after graduation appeared in television commercials, dramas and films.

== Career ==
Han's first major role was in Our Fantastic 21st Century (너와 나의 21세기, Neowa naui 21 segi), an independent film directed by Ryu Hyeong-ki. She became known for her role in daily drama, Pure Love (일말의 순정, Ilmarui sunjeong), which ran from February to August 2013, on KBS2.

== Filmography ==
=== Film ===
Year	Title	Role	Notes/Ref.
2006	The World of Silence	Jung Yoo-jin	
2008	Drawing Paper		
2008	Do Re Mi Fa So La Ti Do	Dong-hee	
2008	Modern Boy	Modern girl	
2009	Our Fantastic 21st Century	Soo-young	
2010	Loveholic	Kyeong-rin	
2011	Hanji	Da-young	
2011	Moby Dick	Seo Eun-sook	
2011	Officer of the Year	Hyun-sook	
2012	The Strangers	Yeon-hee	
2015	Bad Man	Na Yoo-mi	
2017	The King		
2019	Real Culprit		
TBA	Hwapyeong Spot	Young-hee's mother	
TBA	Amazing Story – Meet You Again	Lee Hwa-young	

=== Television ===
Year	Title	Role	Notes/Ref.
2013	Pure Love	Ha So-yeon	
2014	World Theme Journey – Hungary	Self	
2014	Hi! School: Love On	Teacher Choi So-jin	
2016	Love in the Moonlight	Queen Kim	
2016	The Vampire Detective	Yeon Joo	
2018	Your Honor	Bang Woo-jeong	
2020	Flower of Evil	Jung Mi-Sook	
2020–2021	Cheat on Me If You Can	Park Hye-kyeong	
2022	Kill Heel	Ham Shin-ae	
2023	Brain Works	Jung In-young	Cameo
2023	Pandora: Beneath the Paradise	Hong Yu-ra	
2025	Haunted Palace	Queen Dowager Da-bi	

=== Web series ===
Year	Title	Role	Ref.
2022	The King of Pigs	Park Min-joo	

=== Television shows ===
Year	Title	Role	Notes	Ref.
2022	World Theme Tour	Host	Episode Saipan and Guam	

== Ambassadorship ==
- Consult the Department of Veterans Affairs and Veterans Affairs policy (2022)
