= Lee Min-ji (Miss Korea) =

South Korean model (born 1991)

- Born: May 10, 1991 (age 35); Suwon, South Korea
- Other name: Mandy Lee
- Height: 1.72 m (5 ft 7 1/2 in)
- Beauty pageant titleholder
- Title: Miss Korea 2015
- Years active: 2015–present
- Hair color: Brown
- Eye color: Black
- Major competitions: Miss Korea Gyeonggi 2015 (Winner); Miss Korea 2015 (Winner)

Lee Min-ji (born May 10, 1991) is a South Korean model and beauty pageant titleholder who was crowned Miss Korea 2015.

== Personal life ==
Lee Min-ji was born in Suwon, South Korea and majored in vocals at Sungshin Women's University.

=== Miss Korea 2015 ===
Min-ji was crowned Miss Korea 2015 during the Miss Korea 2015 competition held on July 10, 2015.

== Filmography ==
=== Television series ===
Year	Title	Role	Network
2018	Love to the End	Jang Hae-ri	KBS2

Awards and achievements
Preceded by Kim Seo-yeon	Miss Korea; 2015	Succeeded by Kim Jin-sol
