= Virus (2025 film) =

2025 film by Kang Yi-kwan

- Theatrical release poster
- Hangul: 바이러스
- RR: Baireoseu
- MR: Pairŏsŭ
- Directed by: Kang Yi-kwan
- Written by: Kang Yi-kwan
- Produced by: Park Eun-kyung; Park Joo-young
- Starring: Bae Doona; Kim Yoon-seok; Chang Kiha; Son Suk-ku
- Cinematography: Hwang Ki-seok
- Edited by: Yang Jin-mo
- Music by: Lee Byung-woo
- Production company: The Lamp
- Distributed by: By4M Studio
- Release date: May 7, 2025
- Running time: 98 minutes
- Country: South Korea
- Language: Korean
- Box office: US$456,388

Virus (Korean: 바이러스) is a 2025 South Korean romantic comedy-drama film written and directed by Kang Yi-kwan. It stars Bae Doona, Kim Yoon-seok, Chang Kiha, and Son Suk-ku. The film was released on May 7, 2025.

== Plot ==
Taek-seon, a translator drained of energy, motivation, and any trace of romance, is going through a lifeless routine. After a disastrous blind date with Su-pil, a socially awkward researcher who proposes marriage on their first meeting, Taek-seon's world suddenly turns rosy the very next day. She finds herself smiling for no reason, drawn to flashy dresses she would have never looked at before, and even the daily texts from her old classmate Yeon-woo feel endearing.

But when she learns she has been infected by a fatal virus and meets Lee Gyun, the only researcher capable of developing a cure, Taek-seon realizes all these changes are symptoms of the virus.

== Cast ==
- Bae Doona as Ok Taek-seon
- Kim Yoon-seok as Lee Gyun
- Chang Kiha as Kim Yeon-woo
- Moon Sung-keun as Professor Sung
- Kim Hee-won as Director
- Oh Hyun-kyung as Choi Young-hee
- Min Jin-woong as Jeong Hoon
- Yeom Hye-ran as Yeom Mak-soon
- Yu Soon-Woong as Na Jeong-bae
- Lee Kyung-jin as Taek-seon's mother
- Kwak Min-ho as Kim
- Cha Jung-won as Policeman
- Son Suk-ku as Nam Su-pil
- Choi Hyeong-in as Lee Gyun-mo
- Kim Ye-won as Ok Ji-seon
- Park Hee-von as Lee Joo

== Production ==
=== Development ===
The production of Virus began when director Kang Yi-kwan, seeking a more playful story after his previous work, Juvenile Offender, was recommended author Lee Ji-min's novel. Though the exact title suggested was unavailable, Kang discovered Lee's Extreme Youth at the library and was immediately taken by its imaginative concept. The film's early working title was Love Is a Virus. Although Kang initially entertained outlandish variations of the virus's effects, he ultimately chose to ground the story in a more intimate, character-driven journey.

=== Filming ===
Production was completed prior to the COVID-19 pandemic. A reference to COVID was added via post-synced dialogue in a blind date scene, otherwise the film remained unchanged. Kang acknowledged that the pandemic might lead audiences to interpret the film differently, given the global experience of living through a real virus outbreak.

== Release ==
Virus premiered in South Korean theaters on May 7, 2025, distributed by By4M Studio.

== Reception ==
The film was released on May 7, 2025, on 555 screens. It opened at fifth place at the South Korean box office with 11,453 admissions.

As of May 17, 2025, the film has grossed US$456,388 from 71,330 admissions.
