= Unframed =

2021 South Korean television series

- Promotional poster
- Hangul: 언프레임드
- RR: Eonpeureimdeu
- MR: Ŏnp'ŭreimdŭ
- Genre: Drama
- Screenplay by: Park Jeong-min; Son Suk-ku; Choi Hee-seo; Lee Je-hoon
- Directed by: Park Jeong-min; Son Suk-ku; Choi Hee-seo; Lee Je-hoon
- Starring: See list
- Country of origin: South Korea
- Original language: Korean
- No. of episodes: 4

Production
- Production company: Hardcut

Original release
- Release: December 8, 2021

Unframed (Korean: 언프레임드) is a South Korean streaming television series. Actors Park Jeong-min, Son Suk-ku, Choi Hee-seo and Lee Je-hoon each wrote and directed an episode of the series. It was released on the over-the-top media service Watcha on December 8, 2021.

== Overview ==
English (working) title	Korean title	Screenwriter and director
Class Representative Election	Korean: 반장선거; RR: Banjang seongeo	Park Jeong-min
Rerun	재방송; Jaebangsong	Son Suk-ku
Bandi	반디; Bandi	Choi Hee-seo
Blue Happiness	블루 해피니스	Lee Je-hoon

== Cast ==
=== Class Representative Election ===
- Kim Dam-ho
- Kang Ji-seok
- Park Hyo-eun
- Park Seung-joon

=== Rerun ===
- Im Sung-jae
- Byun Joong-ji
- Oh Min-ae

=== Bandi ===
- Park So-yi
- Choi Hee-seo
- Jo Kyung-seok
- Shin Hyun-soo

=== Blue Happiness ===
- Jung Hae-in
- Lee Dong-hwi
- Kim Da-ye
- Tang Jun-sang
- Pyo Ye-jin

== Production ==
=== Development ===
On April 20, 2021, the streaming service Watcha announced the production of Unframed, a 4-part project which would mark Park Jeong-min, Son Suk-ku, Choi Hee-seo and Lee Je-hoon's directorial debuts. The project is produced by Hardcut.

=== Casting ===
The cast lineup was revealed on August 31, 2021.
