= Jung Eui-jae =

South Korean actor

- Born: 5 September 1990 (age 36); Seoul, South Korea
- Other name: Jeong Eui-jae
- Education: Chung-Ang University (Department of Theater and Film)
- Occupations: Actor; model; singer
- Years active: 2014–present
- Agent: HB Entertainment
- Known for: The Real Has Come! The King of Pigs; Kill Heel

Jung Eui-jae is a South Korean actor, singer and model. He is known for his roles in dramas such as The King of Pigs, Kill Heel, Flower Crew: Joseon Marriage Agency and The Real Has Come!.

== Discography ==
=== Soundtrack appearances ===
Title	Year	Album	Ref.
"Another Coincidence" (다른우연)	2016	Justice System	

== Filmography ==
=== Television series ===
Year	Title	Role	Ref.
2019	Flower Crew: Joseon Marriage Agency	Hyun	
2020	Get Revenge	Kim Hyun-sung	
2022	Kill Heel	Seo Joon-beom	
2022	The King of Pigs	Jin Hae-soo	
2022	Curtain Call	Mu-jin	
2023	The Real Has Come!	Kim Joon-ha	
2024	Bad Guy's Guide to Love	Dong-jin	
2025	Okay, Let's Get a Divorce	Kang Gyeong-tae	
2026	Siren's Kiss	Ha Eun Gyeom	

=== Web series ===
Year	Title	Role	Ref.
2018	Miss Independent Ji Eun	Park Woo-jin	
2019	Miss Independent Ji Eun 2	Park Woo-jin	

=== Film ===
Year	Title	Role	Ref.
2017	Dear	Jun-young	

=== Music video appearances ===
Year	Title	Artist	Length	Ref.
2014	Christmalo	Seo Taiji	3:35	
2014	LUV	Apink	4:00	
2015	Mismatch	Shin Bo-ra	3:35	
2015	Why Not	Ella Chen	6:04	

== Theatre ==
Year	Title	Korean Title	Role	Ref.
2018	I'm Going To You At The Speed Of Light	너에게 빛의 속도로 간다	Lee Seung-yeop	
2019	Rimbaud	랭보	Delaé	
2020	Eyes of Dawn	여명의 눈동자	Kwon Dong-jin	

== Awards and nominations ==
Name of the award ceremony, year presented, category, nominee of the award, and the result of the nomination
Award ceremony	Year	Category	Nominee / Work	Result	Ref.
KBS Drama Awards	2023	Best New Actor	The Real Has Come!	Nominated	
