= Son Suk-ku =

South Korean actor (born 1983)

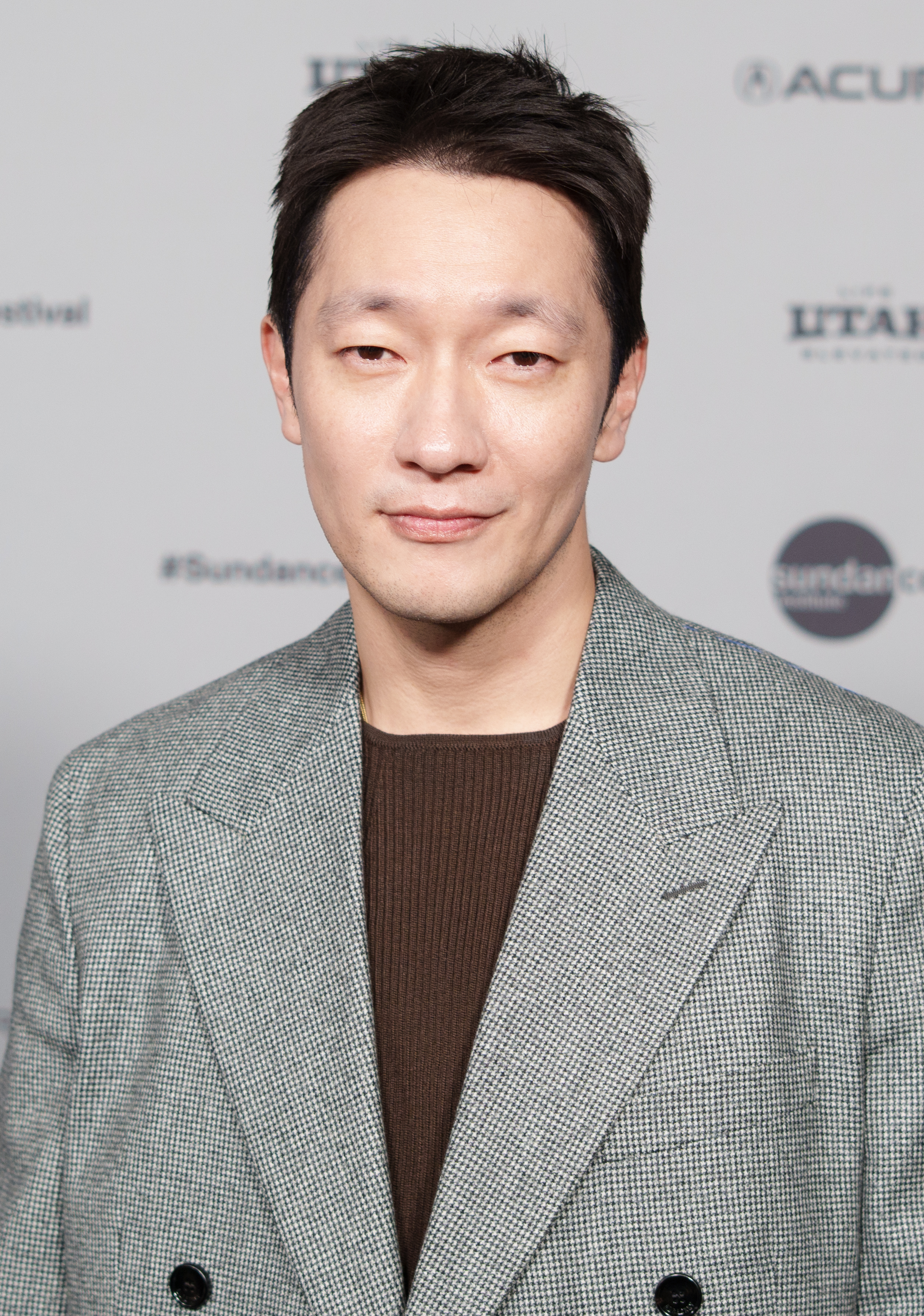
- Son at the Sundance Film Festival in 2026
- Born: February 7, 1983 (age 43); Daejeon, South Korea
- Education: School of the Art Institute of Chicago (FVNMA)
- Occupation: Actor
- Years active: 2014–present

Korean name
- Hangul: 손석구
- RR: Son Seokgu
- MR: Son Sŏkku

Son Suk-ku (Korean: 손석구; pronounced [son.sʌk̚.ku]; born February 7, 1983) is a South Korean actor. He gained recognition for his roles in the television series Matrimonial Chaos (2018), Designated Survivor: 60 Days (2019), D.P. (2021–2023), My Liberation Notes (2022), A Killer Paradox (2024) and Heavenly Ever After (2025), as well as the films Nothing Serious (2021) and The Roundup (2022).

== Early life ==
Son was born on February 7, 1983, in Taepyeong-dong, Jung District, Daejeon, South Korea. He started studying abroad early in middle school and continued his studies in Canada and the United States. He majored in visual arts and film at the School of Art Institute of Chicago, dreaming of becoming a documentary director.

In 2005, during his mandatory military service, he volunteered to join the Zaytun Division, a Republic of Korea Army contingent which carried out peacekeeping and reconstruction missions in war-torn Iraq.

== Career ==
Son began his acting career, playing a minor role in 2014 film Scarlet Innocence and appeared in Black Stone (2016), Sense8 (2017) and Mother (2018).

His popularity began to rise with his starring role in KBS2 romantic comedy drama Matrimonial Chaos (2018) and his supporting role in the tvN political thriller drama Designated Survivor: 60 Days (2019).

In 2021, he played Captain Im Ji-seop in the Netflix series D.P. The same year, he starred in the romance film Nothing Serious which marked his first big-screen leading role. Son made his directorial debut in the Watcha short film Unframed – Rebroadcast.

In 2022, Son starred in the JTBC slice-of-life drama My Liberation Notes. His portrayal of Mr. Gu, a reclusive alcoholic stranger, earned praise from critics and audiences and he topped the drama performers popularity ranking for five consecutive weeks. The same year, he starred as the villain Kang Hae-sung in the crime action blockbuster The Roundup, which became the highest-grossing film of 2022 in South Korea, selling 12 million tickets. Success of his 2022 projects raised his popularity and recognition.

In 2025, he had a special appearance in the romantic comedy-drama film Virus directed by Kang Yi-kwan. He then starred in JTBC's romantic fantasy television series Heavenly Ever After playing a postman who delivers letters of wishes from earth. This was followed with a starring role in the mystery crime thriller television series Nine Puzzles alongside Kim Da-mi.

== Filmography ==
=== Film ===
Year	Title	Role	Notes	Ref.
2014	Scarlet Innocence	Casino henchman 2	Bit part	
2016	Black Stone	First Lieutenant	Independent film	
2017	Wedding	Sung-hoon	Short film	
2019	Hit-and-Run Squad	Ki Tae-ho		
2019	Shimchung Girl	Doctor		
2021	Nothing Serious	Park Woo-ri		
2021	Unframed – Rebroadcast	Director, script writer	Short film	
2022	The Roundup	Kang Hae-sang		
2023	It's Okay!	Dong-wook	Special appearance	
2024	Troll Factory	Im Sang-jin		
2025	Virus	Nam Soo-pil	Special appearance	
2026	Bedford Park	Eli		
TBA	Dreams	Dong-wook		

=== Television series ===
Year	Title	Role	Notes	Ref.
2016	Kidnapping Assemblyman Mr. Clean	Sang-chul's subordinate	Special drama	
2017	Sense8	Detective Mun	Season 2	
2018	Mother	Seol-ak		
2018	Suits	David Kim		
2018	Matrimonial Chaos	Lee Jang-hyun		
2019	Designated Survivor: 60 Days	Cha Young-jin		
2019	Be Melodramatic	Kim Sang-soo	Special appearance (Ep. 10, 12–16)	
2021–2023	D.P.	Im Ji-seop	Season 1–2	
2021	Jirisan	Lim Cheol-kyeong	Special appearance (Ep. 6)	
2022	My Liberation Notes	Mr. Gu (Gu Ja-gyeong)		
2022–2023	Big Bet	Oh Seung-hoon		
2024	A Killer Paradox	Jang Nan-gam		
2025	Heavenly Ever After	Ko Nak-joon		
2025	Nine Puzzles	Kim Han-saem		

=== Music video appearances ===
Year	Song title	Artist	Ref.
2019	"Alone" (혼자)	Gummy	

== Theater ==
Year	English title	Korean title	Role	Ref.
2023	Army on the Tree	나무 위의 군대	Recruiter	

== Accolades ==
=== Awards and nominations ===
Name of the award ceremony, year presented, category, nominee of the award, and the result of the nomination
Award ceremony	Year	Category	Nominee / Work	Result	Ref.
APAN Star Awards	2022	Best Couple Award	Son Suk-ku (with Kim Ji-won); My Liberation Notes	Nominated	
APAN Star Awards	2022	Excellence Award, Actor in Miniseries	My Liberation Notes	Nominated	
APAN Star Awards	2022	Popularity Star Award, Actor	My Liberation Notes	Nominated	
Baeksang Arts Awards	2019	Best New Actor – Film	Hit-and-Run Squad	Nominated	
Baeksang Arts Awards	2019	Best New Actor – Television	Matrimonial Chaos	Nominated	
Baeksang Arts Awards	2023	Best Actor – Television	My Liberation Notes	Nominated	
Blue Dragon Series Awards	2022	Best Supporting Actor	D.P.	Nominated	
Brand of the Year Awards	2022	Best Actor	Son Suk-ku	Won	
Buil Film Awards	2022	Best New Actor	The Roundup	Nominated	
Chunsa Film Art Awards	2022	Best Supporting Actor	The Roundup	Nominated	
Director's Cut Awards	2022	Best New Actor in film	Nothing Serious	Nominated	
Grand Bell Awards	2022	Best Supporting Actor	The Roundup	Nominated	
KBS Drama Awards	2018	Best New Actor	Suits, Matrimonial Chaos	Nominated	
Kinolights Awards	2022	Actor of the Year (Domestic)	The Roundup, My Liberation Notes	2nd Place	
Korean Association of Film Critics Awards	2022	Best New Actor	The Roundup	Won	
Marie Claire Asia Star Awards	2026	Cinema Icon Award	Son Suk-ku	Won	

=== Listicles ===
Name of publisher, year listed, name of listicle, and placement
Publisher	Year	Listicle	Placement	Ref.
Cine21	2021	New Actor to watch out for in 2022	1st	
Cine21	2024	"Korean Film NEXT 50" – Actors	Placed	
Elle Japan	2022	Top 16 Hallyu Best Actor	1st	
Forbes	2023	Korea Power Celebrity 40	7th	
