= Kim Jin-sol =

South Korean beauty pageant titleholder (born 1993)

- Born: November 3, 1993 (age 32); Seoul, South Korea
- Height: 1.78 m (5 ft 10 in)
- Beauty pageant titleholder
- Title: Miss Korea Seoul 2016; Miss Korea 2016
- Years active: 2016-present
- Hair color: Brown
- Eye color: Black

Kim Jin-sol (born November 3, 1993) is a South Korean model and beauty pageant titleholder who was crowned Miss Korea 2016.

== Personal life ==
Kim Jin-sol was born in Seoul, South Korea and majored in vocals at Sookmyung Women's University.

=== Miss Korea 2016 ===
Kim Jin-sol was crowned Miss Korea 2016 during the Miss Korea 2016 competition held on July 8, 2016.

Awards and achievements
Preceded by Lee Min-ji	Miss Korea; 2016	Succeeded by Seo Jae-won
