= Shim Ji-ho =

South Korean actor

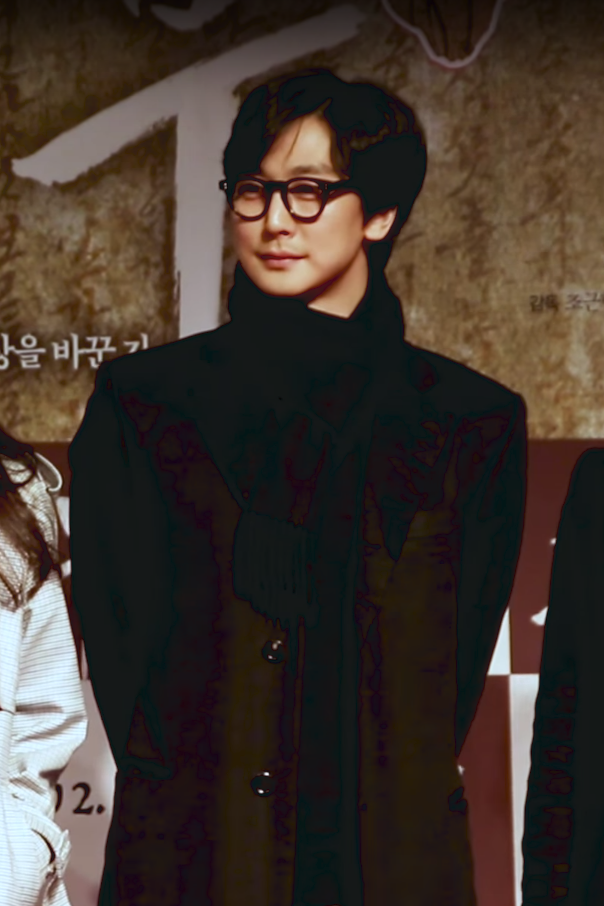
- Shim in 2018
- Born: May 2, 1981 (age 45); South Korea
- Education: Sejong University - Film Art
- Occupation: Actor
- Years active: 1999–present
- Agent: H8 Company
- Spouse: (m. 2013)
- Children: Shim Yi-an; Shim Yi-el

Korean name
- Hangul: 심지호
- RR: Sim Jiho
- MR: Sim Chiho

Shim Ji-ho (born May 2, 1981) is a South Korean actor. He began his entertainment career as a model, then turned to acting. He has starred in television dramas such as School 2 (1999), My Lovely Family (2004), Our Stance on How to Treat a Break-up (2005) and Color of Women (2011), as well as Park Chul-soo's erotic film Green Chair which premiered at the 2005 Sundance Film Festival.

== Filmography ==
=== Film ===
Year	Title	Role
2000	Striker	Han Tae-soo
2005	Green Chair	Seo-hyun
2008	Open City	Choi Seong-soo
2008	A Frozen Flower	Seung-gi

=== Television series ===
Year	Title	Role	Network
1999	School 2	Han Tae-hoon	KBS2
1999	Rising Sun, Rising Moon	Park Sung-jin	KBS1
2000	Soseol Mokminsimseo	In-ha	KBS2
2000	The Clinic for Married Couples: Love and War: "The Prince and the Princess"		KBS2
2000	The Clinic for Married Couples: Love and War: "Wife's Lover"	Kim Dong-hwa	KBS2
2001	Drama City	Thoracic surgeon Jin-chul	KBS2
2001	Saturday Story Land: "4th Wonderful Encounter, Wonderful Love"		SBS
2001	I Like Dong-seo	Yoon Tae-yeol	KBS2
2001	Honey Honey: "My Brother's Girlfriend"	Kim Seung-joon	SBS
2001	Special Warrant 203	Detective Lee Dae-bok	KBS2
2002	The Clinic for Married Couples: Love and War: "Twenty-year-old Couple"		KBS2
2002	Zoo People	Go Doo-gil	KBS2
2004	My Lovely Family	Kim Jae-min	KBS1
2004	I'm Sorry, I Love You	Kang Min-joo's boyfriend	KBS2
2004	Stained Glass	Shin Ji-suk	SBS
2005	Our Stance on How to Treat a Break-up	Han Jae-min	MBC
2006	You Are My Life	Joo-hyuk	CCTV
2011	Color of Women	Kang Chan-jin	Channel A
2012	Family	Cha Ji-ho	KBS2
2013–2014	Passionate Love	Han Soo-hyuk	SBS
2016	You Are a Gift	Han Yoon-ho	SBS
2017	Argon	Eom Min-ho	tvN
2018	Love to the End	Kang Hyun-ki	KBS2
2019	Unasked Family	Kim Ji-hoon	KBS1
2019	Want a Taste?	cameo ep. 68	SBS
2021	The All-Round Wife	Seo Kang-rim	KBS1

=== Variety show ===
Year	Title	Network	Notes
2008	Hard Boiled Wonder Couple	Mnet	
2013	Let's Go Out to the World	MBC	
2019	The Return of Superman	KBS	Special cast (episodes 264, 269 and 272)
2020	Stars' Top Recipe at Fun-Staurant	KBS2	Guest chef (episodes 21-23)
2020	King of Mask Singer	MBC	Contestant as "Wolf Temptation" (episode 255)

== Discography ==
Year	Song title	Artist	Notes
2013	"You & I Together"	Shim Ji-ho and Park Hee-von	Track from Family OST
2013	"Srrr Intro"	SunBee (Narration by Shim Ji-ho)	Track from The Beginning... Draw the Sounds EP

== Awards and nominations ==
Year	Award	Category	Nominated work	Result
1999	KBS Drama Awards	Best Young Actor	School 2	Won
2004	2nd Andre Kim Best Star Awards	Best Performer	My Lovely Family	Won
2016	SBS Drama Awards	Excellence Award, Actor in a Serial Drama	You Are a Gift	Nominated
2018	KBS Drama Awards	Excellence Award, Actor in a Daily Drama	Love to the End	Nominated
