= Feel Good to Die =

2018 South Korean television series

- Promotional poster
- Hangul: 죽어도 좋아
- Lit.: Even If I Die, I Like It
- RR: Jugeodo joa
- MR: Chugŏdo choa
- Genre: Comedy; Romance; Office; Supernatural
- Based on: Happy If You Died by Gold Kiwi Bird (골드키위새)
- Developed by: KBS Drama Production
- Written by: Im Seo-ra
- Directed by: Lee Eun-jin
- Starring: Kang Ji-hwan; Baek Jin-hee; Gong Myung
- Country of origin: South Korea
- Original language: Korean
- No. of episodes: 32

Production
- Executive producers: Chang-woo Vincent Hwang; Jo Hye-rin; Kim Tae-goo; Lee Gun-joon
- Producer: Lee Jung-mi
- Running time: 35 minutes
- Production companies: Production H; Y-People ENT

Original release
- Network: KBS2
- Release: November 7 – December 27, 2018

Feel Good to Die (Korean: 죽어도 좋아; RR: Jugeodo joa) is a 2018 South Korean television series based on the Daum webcomic of the same name, starring Kang Ji-hwan, Baek Jin-hee and Gong Myung. It aired on KBS2, Wednesdays and Thursdays at 22:00 (KST), from November 7 to December 27, 2018.

== Synopsis ==
The story of "evil boss" Baek Jin-sang and assistant manager Lee Roo-da, who tries to transform him into a better person. Both of them are stuck in a time loop and they are trying to find the problem that is causing this.

== Cast ==
=== Main ===
- Kang Ji-hwan as Baek Jin-sang
- Baek Jin-hee as Lee Roo-da
- Gong Myung as Kang Jun-ho

=== Supporting ===
==== Marketing Team ====
- Ryu Hyun-kyung as Choi Min-joo
- Kim Min-jae as Park Yoo-deok
- Jung Min-ah as Lee Jung-hwa

==== MW Chicken ====
- Park Sol-mi as Yoo Shi-baek
- In Gyo-jin as Kang In-han
- Lee Byung-joon as Na Cheol-soo

==== Others ====
- Kim Ki-hyeon as Kang Soo-chan
- Jo Han-chul as Yoon Dong-chan
- Seo Jeong-yeon as Ahn Seon-nyeo
- Jang Yoo-sang as Lee Young-doo
- Kim Ye-won as Yoon-mi
- Kim Bo-jung as Lee Roo-ri

=== Special appearances ===
- Kim Won-hae
- Yoo Min-sang
- Kim Seon-ho

== Original soundtrack ==
Feel Good to Die OST

Soundtrack album by Various artists
- Released: 2018
- Genre: Soundtrack
- Languages: Korean; English
- Labels: Most Contents; NHN Bugs

=== Part 1 ===
Released on November 8, 2018
No.	Title	Artist	Length
1.	"Dol Go Dol Go Dol Go" (돌고돌고돌고)	Yook Joong-wan; Choi Seo-hyun	4:02
2.	"Dol Go Dol Go Dol Go" (Inst.)		4:02
Total length:			8:04

=== Part 2 ===
Released on November 14, 2018
No.	Title	Artist	Length
1.	"Always Be With You" (항상 너의 곁에 내가 있을게)	Standing Egg	3:38
2.	"Always Be With You" (Inst.)		3:38
Total length:			7:16

=== Part 3 ===
Released on November 22, 2018
No.	Title	Artist	Length
1.	"Hero" (히어로)	Kang Kyun-sung (Noel)	3:17
2.	"Hero" (Inst.)		3:17
Total length:			6:34

=== Part 4 ===
Released on November 29, 2018
No.	Title	Artist	Length
1.	"For You" (그댈 위해)	Lucia	3:49
2.	"For You" (Inst.)		3:49
Total length:			7:38

=== Part 5 ===
Released on December 6, 2018
No.	Title	Artist	Length
1.	"Day After Day" (또 하루)	Jo Won-sun	4:16
2.	"Day After Day" (Inst.)		4:16
Total length:			8:32

=== Part 6 ===
Released on December 19, 2018
No.	Title	Artist	Length
1.	"I Don't Know" (몰랐어)	Parc Jae-jung
2.	"I Don't Know" (Inst.)

== Ratings ==
- In the table below, the blue numbers represent the lowest ratings and the red numbers represent the highest ratings.
- N/A denotes that the rating is not known.

Ep.	Broadcast date	Average audience share (nationwide)	
Ep.	Broadcast date	TNmS	AGB Nielsen
1	November 7, 2018	4.5%	4.0%
2	November 7, 2018	4.1%	4.0%
3	November 8, 2018	—N/a	2.5%
4	November 8, 2018	—N/a	3.3%
5	November 14, 2018	—N/a	2.5%
6	November 14, 2018	—N/a	3.0%
7	November 15, 2018	—N/a	2.2%
8	November 15, 2018	—N/a	2.7%
9	November 21, 2018	2.8%	2.6%
10	November 21, 2018	3.3%	3.0%
11	November 22, 2018	3.2%	3.0%
12	November 22, 2018	3.6%	3.6%
13	November 28, 2018	3.0%	2.4%
14	November 28, 2018	3.6%	3.5%
15	November 29, 2018	—N/a	2.8%
16	November 29, 2018	—N/a	3.3%
17	December 5, 2018	3.1%	2.5%
18	December 5, 2018	3.4%	2.8%
19	December 6, 2018	—N/a	2.1%
20	December 6, 2018	—N/a	2.7%
21	December 12, 2018	—N/a	2.4%
22	December 12, 2018	—N/a	2.4%
23	December 13, 2018	—N/a	1.9%
24	December 13, 2018	—N/a	2.5%
25	December 19, 2018	—N/a	2.2%
26	December 19, 2018	—N/a	2.8%
27	December 20, 2018	2.8%	2.0%
28	December 20, 2018	3.0%	2.2%
29	December 26, 2018	3.0%	2.0%
30	December 26, 2018	2.9%	1.9%
31	December 27, 2018	2.9%	2.7%
32	December 27, 2018	3.2%	2.7%
Average		-	2.69%

== Awards and nominations ==
Year	Award	Category	Nominee	Result	Ref.
2018	2018 KBS Drama Awards	Excellence Award, Actor in a Miniseries	Kang Ji-hwan	Nominated	
2018	2018 KBS Drama Awards	Excellence Award, Actress in a Miniseries	Baek Jin-hee	Won	
2018	2018 KBS Drama Awards	Best Supporting Actor	In Gyo-jin	Won	
