= Jugglers (TV series) =

South Korean TV series

- Promotional poster
- Hangul: 저글러스: 비서들
- Lit.: Jugglers: Secretaries
- RR: Jeogeulleoseu: biseodeul
- MR: Chŏgŭllŏsŭ: pisŏdŭl
- Genre: Romantic comedy; Workplace
- Created by: KBS Drama Production
- Written by: Jo Yong-hae
- Directed by: Kim Jung-hyun
- Starring: Baek Jin-hee; Choi Daniel; Kang Hye-jung; Lee Won-keun
- Country of origin: South Korea
- Original language: Korean
- No. of episodes: 16

Production
- Executive producers: Bae Sun-hae; Lee Min-jin; Moon Joon-ha
- Producer: Yoon Jae-hyuk
- Camera setup: Single-camera
- Running time: 60 minutes
- Production company: Story TV

Original release
- Network: KBS2
- Release: December 4, 2017 – January 23, 2018

Jugglers (Korean: 저글러스) is a 2017 South Korean television series starring Baek Jin-hee, Choi Daniel, Kang Hye-jung and Lee Won-keun. It aired on KBS2 from December 4, 2017, to January 23, 2018, every Monday and Tuesday at 22:00 (KST) for 16 episodes.

== Synopsis ==
A secretary with a passive and obedient personality meets a boss who is completely uninterested in others and has no consideration for them.

== Cast ==
=== Main ===
- Baek Jin-hee as Jwa Yoon-yi (29 years old), Chi-won's secretary who is skilled in assisting and supporting her superiors. She is quick to adapt and knows how to get by in any situation.
- Choi Daniel as Nam Chi-won (36 years old), the director of a media company who is completely uninterested in others and has no consideration for them, but somehow always ends up getting attention from women.
- Kang Hye-jung as Wang Jeong-ae (37 years old), a mother who returns to the workforce after fifteen years as a full-time housewife.
- Lee Won-keun as Hwangbo Yul (28 years old), the director of sports business department who was born with a silver spoon in his mouth.

=== Supporting ===
- Cha Joo-young as Ma Bo-na (29 years old)
- Jung Hye-in as Park Kyung-rye (29 years old)
- In Gyo-jin as Managing Director Jo Sang-moo (44 years old)
  - In Gyo-jin as himself (Cameo appearance, ep. 16)
- Kim Chang-wan as Vice President Do Tae-geun (61 years old)
- Moon Ji-hoo as Min Deul-re

==== Video division ====
- Jung Sung-ho as Director Gong Yoo (42 years old)
- Jung Soo-young as Moon Soon-yeong (34 years old)
- Kim Ki-bang as Park Chi-soo (33 years old)
- Song Ji-ho as Go Myung-suk (28 years old)

==== Sports division ====
- Cha Soon-bae as General Manager Baek Soon-bae (45 years old)
- Park Kyung-hye as Goo Kye-young (30 years old)
- Shin Min-kyung as Go Si-won (26 years old)
- Kim Se-rin as Joo Pan-mi (22 years old)

==== People around Yoon-yi ====
- Min Jin-woong as Woo Chang-soo (32 years old), Yoon-yi's ex-boyfriend.
- Hong Kyung as Jwa Tae-yi (21 years old), Yoon-yi's younger brother.
- Lee Ji-ha as Kang Soon-deok (54 years old), Yoon-yi's mother.
- Ripon as arnob (23 Year old), he is a handsome man every woman like him.

=== Extended ===
- Choi Dae-chul as Director Bong Jang-woo
- Jung Joon-won as Park Gun-woo, Jeong-ae's son
- Cha Joo-young as Ma Bo-na
- Kim Soo-yeon as Wang Mi-ae, Jeong-ae's younger sister
- Seo Eun-woo as Do Do-hee, Chi-won's ex-wife and Do Tae-geun's daughter
- Jeon Joon-ho as Park Joon-pyo, Jeong-ae's husband

=== Cameo appearances ===
- Sung Hoon as Kyung-jun, Yoon-yi's ex-boyfriend.
- Hwang Seung-eon as Secretary Kang
- Alberto Mondi as Henry
- Jung Young-joo as Bong's wife
- Choi Yeo-jin as CEO's secretary
- Yoo Ji-tae as Choi Kang-woo

== Original soundtrack ==
Jugglers Original soundtrack

Soundtrack album by Various Artists
- Genre: Soundtrack
- Labels: The Groove; LOEN Entertainment

=== Part 1 ===
Released on December 5, 2017
No.	Title	Lyrics	Music	Artist	Length
1.	"Cosmic Girl"	Shoulder Gangster	Shoulder Gangster	Soyeon (Laboum)	03:33
2.	"Cosmic Girl" (Inst.)		Shoulder Gangster		03:33
Total length:					07:06

=== Part 2 ===
Released on December 12, 2017
No.	Title	Lyrics	Music	Artist	Length
1.	"Get Me Now"	Moon Sung-nam, Jung Jae-woo	Moon Sung-nam, Jung Jae-woo	Every Single Day	03:28
2.	"Get Me Now" (Inst.)		Moon Sung-nam, Jung Jae-woo		03:28
Total length:					06:56

=== Part 3 ===
Released on December 19, 2017
No.	Title	Lyrics	Music	Artist	Length
1.	"You Must Love Me" (질투하나봐)	Oh Sung-hoon, Good Choice	Oh Sung-hoon, Lee Hyuk-joon	Minseo	03:22
2.	"You Must Love Me" (Inst.)		Oh Sung-hoon, Lee Hyuk-joon		03:22
Total length:					06:44

=== Part 4 ===
Released on December 26, 2017
No.	Title	Lyrics	Music	Artist	Length
1.	"The Wind And Memories Meet, If You're Going To Miss For A While" (바람과 추억이 만나 잠시 그리운 거라면)	Oh Sung-hoon	Oh Sung-hoon, Sung Kyu-ho	DK (December)	03:36
2.	"The Wind And Memories Meet, If You're Going To Miss For A While" (Inst.)		Oh Sung-hoon, Sung Kyu-ho		03:36
Total length:					07:12

=== Part 5 ===
Released on January 2, 2018
No.	Title	Lyrics	Music	Artist	Length
1.	"Cutely Cutely" (애기애기해)	Oh Sung-hoon	Oh Sung-hoon, Lee Hyuk-joon	U-Kwon (Block B), Rothy	03:26
2.	"Cutely Cutely" (Inst.)		Oh Sung-hoon, Lee Hyuk-joon		03:26
Total length:					06:52

=== Part 6 ===
Released on January 9, 2018
No.	Title	Lyrics	Music	Artist	Length
1.	"Angels Of The City" (도시의 천사들)	Kim Kyeong-beom	Kim Kyeong-beom	Lucia	03:51
2.	"Angels Of The City" (Inst.)		Kim Kyeong-beom		03:51
Total length:					07:42

=== Part 7 ===
Released on January 16, 2018
No.	Title	Lyrics	Music	Artist	Length
1.	"Only You Know" (너 밖에 모르고)	Good Choice	Red Socks	Kim Guk-heon (Myteen)	03:40
2.	"Only You Know" (Inst.)		Red Socks		03:40
Total length:					07:20

=== Part 8 ===
Released on January 23, 2018
No.	Title	Lyrics	Music	Artist	Length
1.	"Good Day" (좋은 날에)	Cadence, Yoon Oh-ran	Cadence	Goo Hara	03:16
2.	"Good Day" (Inst.)		Cadence		03:16
Total length:					06:32

== Production ==
- The male lead role was first offered to Yoon Kyun-sang, but declined.
- The series marks Choi Daniel's first acting project after his military service, as well as Kang Hye-jung's first TV series in five years.
- The first script reading of the cast was held at a resort in Incheon which took two days and one night.

== Ratings ==
Ep.	Original broadcast date	Average audience share			
Ep.	Original broadcast date	TNmS		Nielsen Korea	
Ep.	Original broadcast date	Nationwide	Seoul	Nationwide	Seoul
1	December 4, 2017	5.4% (NR)	5.9% (NR)	5.6% (NR)	6.1% (NR)
2	December 5, 2017	6.5% (20th)	6.4% (17th)	7.0% (15th)	6.9% (17th)
3	December 11, 2017	5.0% (NR)	5.7% (NR)	6.8% (NR)	7.6% (NR)
4	December 12, 2017	7.8% (13th)	8.3% (9th)	8.0% (13th)	7.8% (13th)
5	December 18, 2017	6.1% (NR)	6.9% (NR)	6.4% (NR)	7.2% (NR)
6	December 19, 2017	7.3% (14th)	7.4% (13th)	9.1% (9th)	9.3% (6th)
7	December 25, 2017	7.0% (20th)	6.8% (15th)	7.7% (17th)	7.4% (16th)
8	December 26, 2017	8.3% (NR)	8.7% (NR)	9.9% (5th)	9.6% (5th)
9	January 1, 2018	7.3% (NR)	7.4% (NR)	8.1% (16th)	8.2% (17th)
10	January 2, 2018	9.5% (NR)	9.6% (NR)	9.4% (8th)	9.4% (5th)
11	January 8, 2018	6.7% (NR)	7.4% (NR)	7.0% (19th)	7.7% (NR)
12	January 9, 2018	7.6% (15th)	7.9% (NR)	8.5% (10th)	8.8% (8th)
13	January 15, 2018	6.3% (NR)	6.4% (NR)	7.1% (18th)	7.1% (17th)
14	January 16, 2018	7.0% (19th)	7.5% (NR)	8.6% (9th)	8.3% (10th)
15	January 22, 2018	8.1% (16th)	8.5% (NR)	8.2% (15th)	7.8% (15th)
16	January 23, 2018	9.0% (13th)	9.2% (NR)	9.1% (8th)	9.0% (9th)
Average		7.2%	7.5%	7.9%	8.0%
In the table above, the blue numbers represent the lowest ratings and the red numbers represent the highest ratings.; NR denotes that the drama did not rank in the top 20 daily programs on that date.

== Awards and nominations ==
Year	Award	Category	Nominee	Result	Ref.
2018	KBS Drama Awards	Excellence Award, Actor in a Miniseries	Choi Daniel	Won	
2018	KBS Drama Awards	Excellence Award, Actress in a Miniseries	Baek Jin-hee	Won	
2018	KBS Drama Awards	Best Supporting Actor	In Gyo-jin	Won	
2018	KBS Drama Awards	Best New Actress	Cha Joo-young	Nominated	
2018	KBS Drama Awards	Best Couple Award	Choi Daniel and Baek Jin-hee	Won	
