= Baek Jin-hee =

South Korean actress (born 1990)

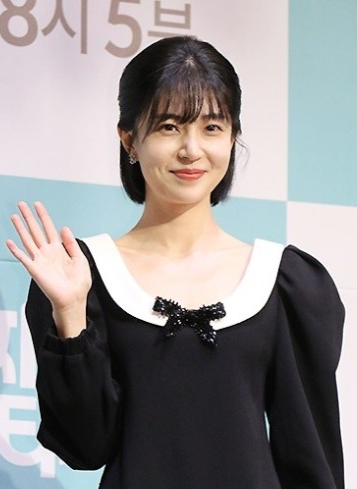
- Baek in 2023
- Born: February 8, 1990 (age 36); Gangdong District, Seoul, South Korea
- Education: Yong In University
- Occupation: Actress
- Years active: 2008–present
- Agent: Management AM9

Korean name
- Hangul: 백진희
- Hanja: 百眞熙
- RR: Baek Jinhui
- MR: Paek Chinhŭi

Baek Jin-hee (Korean: 백진희; born February 8, 1990) is a South Korean actress. She began to be known for her role in High Kick: Revenge of the Short Legged (2011–2012) and rose to prominence for her role in Empress Ki (2013). She also starred in the television drama The Real Has Come! (2023).

== Career ==
Baek Jin-hee began her entertainment career after getting scouted on the streets by a talent agent. She has since then starred in the indie film Bandhobi (2009), where she plays a rebellious girl who befriends a Bangladeshi migrant worker; and sex comedy Foxy Festival (2010) where she plays a teenager with a thriving business selling her used underwear.

Baek then starred in the sitcom High Kick: Revenge of the Short Legged (2011–2012), playing a fresh graduate looking for employment. The series was popular and led to increased recognition for the actress. This was followed with supporting roles in fusion historical drama Jeon Woo-chi and romance drama Pots of Gold.

Baek had her breakthrough role as the villainous empress Tanashiri (Danashiri) in the period drama Empress Ki (2013–2014), She next starred as an orphaned casino dealer in melodrama Triangle (2014), and a passionate prosecutor in legal drama Pride and Prejudice (2014).

In 2015, Baek played the title role in family drama My Daughter, Geum Sa-wol, which was a hit and ended with national viewership of 33.6 percent.

In 2017, Baek played leading roles in the disaster drama Missing 9, and office comedy series Jugglers.

In 2018, Baek was cast as the female protagonist in the third installment of the Let's Eat franchise. The same year, she starred in the webtoon-based romantic comedy drama Feel Good to Die.

== Personal life ==
Baek Jin-Hee is the eldest of three sisters.

On March 26, 2017, Baek's agency confirmed that Baek has been in a relationship with her My Daughter, Geum Sa-wol co-star, Yoon Hyun-min since April 2016. On September 4, 2023, the couple announced their break-up after 7 years of dating.

== Filmography ==
=== Film ===
Year	Title	Role	Notes	Ref.
2009	The Naked Kitchen	Female student with parasol		
2009	Bandhobi	Min-seo		
2009	Missing Person	Da-ye		
2010	Acoustic	Jin-hee		
2010	Foxy Festival	Ja-hye		
2012	Hoya (Eighteen, Nineteen)	Seo-ya		
2013	Rockin' on Heaven's Door	Anna		
2013	Horror Stories 2	Kang Ji-eun	Segment: "The Accident"	

=== Television series ===
Year	Title	Role	Notes	Ref.
2008	Crime 2			
2009	Loving You a Thousand Times	Go Eun-jung		
2010	Drama Special	Park Yeo-jin	Episode: "Secret Flower Garden"	
2011	Drama Special	Lee Young-won	Episode: "Hair Show"	
2011	High Kick: Revenge of the Short Legged	Baek Jin-hee		
2012	Jeon Woo-chi	Lee Hye-ryung		
2013	Pots of Gold	Jung Mong-hyun		
2013	Empress Ki	Tanashiri (Danashiri)		
2014	Triangle	Oh Jung-hee		
2014	Pride and Prejudice	Han Yeol-mu		
2015	My Daughter, Geum Sa-wol	Geum Sa-wol		
2017	Missing 9	Ra Bong-hee		
2017	Jugglers	Jwa Yoon-yi		
2018	Let's Eat 3	Lee Ji-woo		
2018	Feel Good to Die	Lee Roo-da		
2019	My Fellow Citizens!	Newlyweds buying an apartment	Cameo (episode 14)	
2022	Curtain Call	Jin-sook	Cameo (episode 9)	
2023	The Real Has Come!	Oh Yeon-doo		
2025	The Judge Returns	Song Na-yeon		

=== Web series ===
Year	Title	Role	Notes	Ref.
2020	My Holo Love	Voice	Cameo (episode 6)	

=== Variety show ===
Year	Title	Notes	Ref.
2014	Law of the City	Cast member	

=== Music video appearances ===
Year	Title	Artist	Ref.
2010	"Station"	Lee Seok-hun	
2014	"One, Two, Three, Four"	The One	

== Awards and nominations ==
Year	Award	Category	Nominated work	Result	Ref.
2009	Cine21 Film Awards	Best New Actress	Bandhobi	Won	
2010	46th Baeksang Arts Awards	Best New Actress (Film)	Bandhobi	Nominated	
2011	48th Grand Bell Awards	Best New Actress	Foxy Festival	Nominated	
2011	32nd Blue Dragon Film Awards	Best New Actress	Foxy Festival	Nominated	
2011	MBC Entertainment Awards	Popularity Award in a Sitcom/Comedy	High Kick: Revenge of the Short Legged	Won	
2011	KBS Drama Awards	Best Actress in a One-Act Special/Short Drama	Hair Show	Nominated	
2013	MBC Drama Awards	Best New Actress	Empress Ki	Won	
2014	50th Baeksang Arts Awards	Best New Actress (TV)	Empress Ki	Won	
2014	7th Korea Drama Awards	Excellence Award, Actress	Empress Ki	Nominated	
2014	3rd APAN Star Awards	Best Supporting Actress	Empress Ki	Nominated	
2014	2014 MBC Drama Awards	Excellence Award, Actress in a Special Project Drama	Pride and Prejudice, Triangle	Won	
2014	2014 MBC Drama Awards	Best Couple Award with Choi Jin-hyuk	Pride and Prejudice	Nominated	
2015	2015 MBC Drama Awards	Excellence Award, Actress in a Special Project Drama	My Daughter, Geum Sa-wol	Nominated	
2015	2015 MBC Drama Awards	Top 10 Stars	My Daughter, Geum Sa-wol	Won	
2016	9th Korea Drama Awards	Top Excellence Award, Actress	My Daughter, Geum Sa-wol	Won	
2018	KBS Drama Awards	Excellence Award, Actress in a Miniseries	Jugglers, Feel Good to Die	Won	
2018	KBS Drama Awards	Best Couple with Choi Daniel	Jugglers	Won	
2018	KBS Drama Awards	Best Couple with Kang Ji-hwan	Feel Good to Die	Nominated	
2018	KBS Drama Awards	Netizen Award	Feel Good to Die	Nominated	
