= Lee E-dam =

South Korean actress (born 1996)

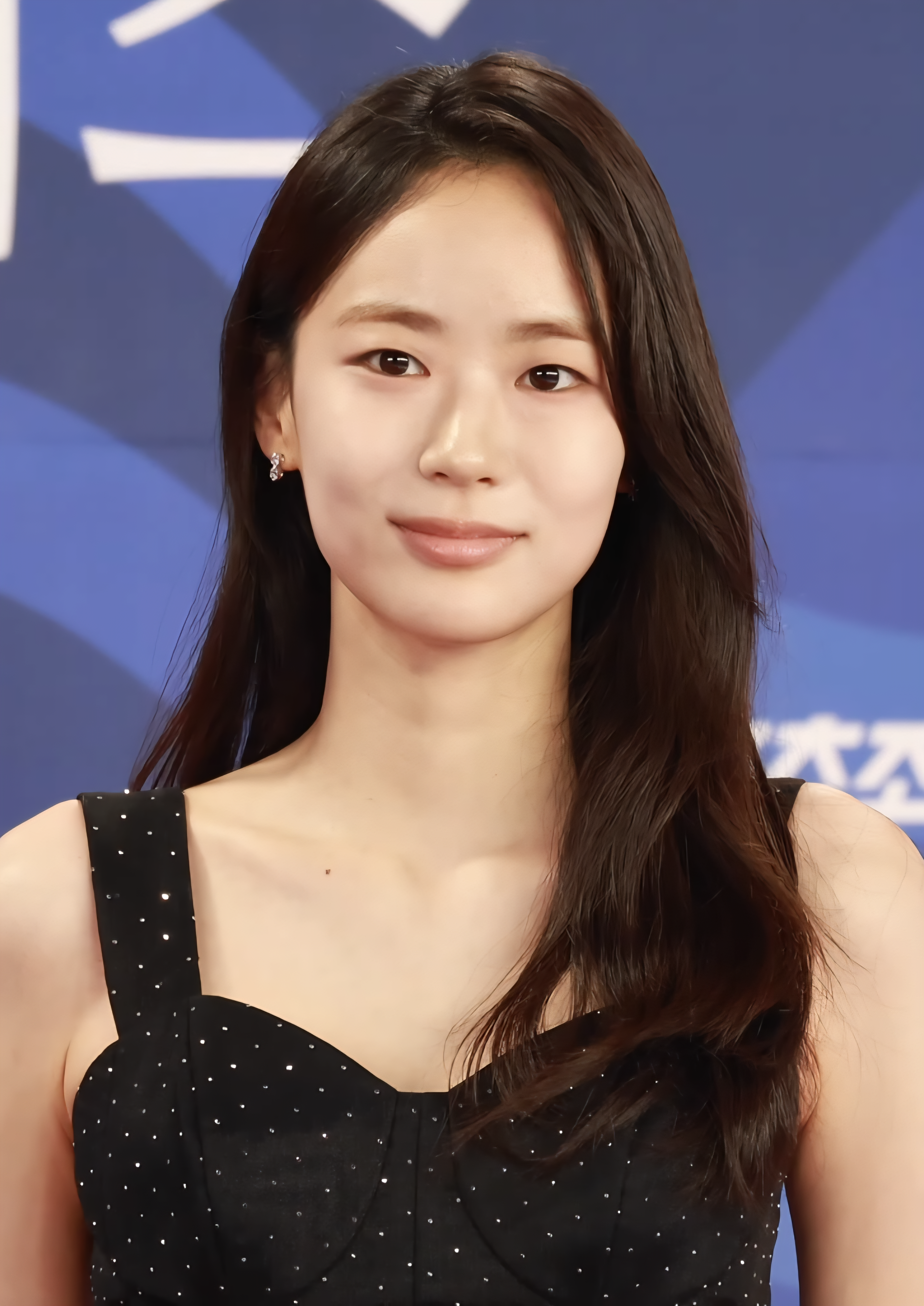
- Lee in July 2025
- Born: Baek Hye-won; May 20, 1996 (age 30); South Korea
- Occupation: Actress
- Years active: 2017–present
- Agent: Ghost Studio

Korean name
- Hangul: 백혜원
- RR: Baek Hyewon
- MR: Paek Hyewŏn

Stage name
- Hangul: 이이담
- RR: I Idam
- MR: I Idam
- Website: ghoststudio.net/ko/artists

Baek Hye-won (Korean: 백혜원; born May 20, 1996), better known by the stage name Lee E-dam (이이담), is a South Korean actress. She is best known for her role as psychiatric nurse Min Deul-re in the Netflix original series Daily Dose of Sunshine (2023), for which she earned a nomination for Best New Actress at the 60th Baeksang Arts Awards. Later, she received another Best New Actress nomination at the 4th Blue Dragon Series Awards for her performance in the TVING and tvN series The Queen Who Crowns (2025).

Lee began her career in short films, making her debut in Hur Jin-ho's Two Lights: Relumino (2017). In 2019, she starred in the short film The Tale of Mari and Yimae, which was nominated for Best Student Fantasy Short Film at the 2020 IndieX Film Festival. She made her television debut in the fourth season of the crime thriller Voice (2021), followed by her first main role in the cable series Artificial City (2021).

== Early life ==
Born as Baek Hye-won on May 20, 1996, Lee E-dam discovered her passion for acting in high school. Watching Princess Hours made her curious about acting, and she joined a theater club at Seomun Girls' High School. While practicing with friends using the same script and performing on stage, Lee was inspired by her peers, which led her to seriously pursue acting as a career.

== Career ==
=== 2017–2019: Beginning ===
After graduating high school, Lee pursued acting by auditioning for small roles. She decided to use a stage name instead of her real name. She wanted a more memorable and gender-neutral name. After considering several options, she settled on Lee E-dam. In 2017, despite initially failing an audition, she eventually starred in director Hur Jin-ho's short film Two Lights: Relumino after a recommendation from someone she met during the audition process.

In 2019, Lee landed a lead role in Won Ji-ho's short film The Tale of Mari and Yimae, which was selected for the Best Student Fantasy Short Film category at the IndieX Film Festival in Los Angeles, USA in May 2020. In 2021, the film was selected as a finalist for the Korean Short Film Competition at the 25th Bucheon International Fantastic Film Festival. In the film, Lee played Mari, a character who experiences oppression from her father. Lee's performance in this role demonstrated her exceptional ability to convey a wide range of emotions, showcasing her talent as an actress and earning her critical acclaim.

=== 2020–2021: Breakthrough roles ===
CEO Choi Myung-gyu from Studio Santa Claus Entertainment discovered Lee after seeing her on a poster for an independent film and signed her to an exclusive contract. In February 2021, she was officially promoted as a rookie actress under the agency. Lee made her television debut in June 2021 in Season 4 of the Crime Drama Voice. The fourth season was premiered on June 18, 2021, and it aired on every Friday and Saturday until July 31, 2021. This marked Lee's television debut. She was praised for her acting performance in the series.

Prior to her television debut in March 2021, Lee secured her first lead role in the thriller drama Artificial City after a successful audition. Directed by Jeon Chang-geun, Artificial City premiered on JTBC on December 8, 2021, and aired every Wednesday and Thursday. The series also stars Soo Ae, Kim Mi-sook, Kim Kang-woo and Lee Hak-joo. Lee acted as Kim Yi-seol, a docent at 'Space Jin,' the Sungjin Group art museum run by Yoon Jae-hee (played by Soo Ae) and received positive feedback for her performance in the series, showcasing her ability to portray the character's complex emotions with mature acting.

=== 2022–present: Streaming series roles ===
In 2022, following a reorganization at Studio Santa Claus Entertainment, Lee followed CEO Choi Myung-gyu to his newly established agency, Ghost Studio. In the following year Lee appeared in two Netflix original series. In the dystopian action drama Black Knight (2023), she portrayed "4-1," a delivery driver fighting for social equality. Her performance was noted for its physical agility and skill in sequences involving hand-to-hand combat, firearms, and wire work. Critics highlighted her portrayal of a loyal subordinate to 5-8 (Kim Woo-bin) and her role as a mentor to the character April, noting that these dynamics added depth to her performance.

Lee subsequently starred in the medical drama Daily Dose of Sunshine (2023), alongside Park Bo-young, Yeon Woo-jin, Jang Dong-yoon and Lee Jung-eun. Directed by Lee Jae-kyoo and based on the Kakao webtoon of the same Korean title by former nurse Lee Ra-ha, the series premiered on Netflix on November 3, 2023. Lee played Min Deul-re, a nurse in the psychiatry department at Myungshin University Hospital. Her performance received critical acclaim and earned her a nomination for Best Supporting Actress at the 60th Baeksang Arts Awards.

In 2025, Lee portrayed Chae-ryeong, a royal servant who becomes the king's consort, in the series The Queen Who Crowns. The drama depicts the life of Queen Wongyeong (Cha Joo-young) and her rise to power alongside King Taejong Yi Bang-won (Lee Hyun-wook). The series aired on TVING and tvN from January 6 to February 11, 2025. Her performance earned a nomination for Best New Actress at the 2025 Blue Dragon Series Awards.

In 2026, Lee appeared in three Netflix original productions. Her first project of the year, the romantic comedy series Can This Love Be Translated?, premiered on January 16. Written by the Hong sisters and directed by Yoo Young-eun, the series features Lee as Shin Ji-seon, a talented producer and the director of a dating reality show titled Romantic Trip. Her character is also depicted as the first love of the protagonist, Joo Ho-jin (portrayed by Kim Seon-ho). Lee was confirmed for the role in June 2024, and principal photography took place from June 2024 to February 2025.

Lee subsequently starred in the thriller The Art of Sarah, which was released on February 13, 2026. She played Kim Mi-jeong, a worker in an illicit factory specializing in high-end counterfeits who is revealed to be the designer behind the Boudoir brand products. This was followed by the Netflix film Pavane on February 20, 2026, where Lee portrayed the character Se-ra.

== Endorsements ==
In 2023, Lee and actor Lee Soo-hyuk were appointed as the primary models for the gender-neutral clothing brand Comgen. In May 2024, she became a muse for the body care brand De-mi-flor.

== Personal life ==
Lee is a cinephile who enjoys watching films at late-night theaters and driving alone.

== Filmography ==
=== Film ===
Acting credits in film
Year	Title	Role	Notes	Ref.
2017	Two Lights: Relumino	Sun-mi	Short film	
2019	The Tale of Mari and Yimae	Ma-ri	Short film	
2020	Beasts Clawing at Straws	Daughter	Bit part	
2026	Pavane	Se-ra	Netflix film	

=== Television series ===
Key
†	Denotes television productions that have not yet been released

Acting credits in television series
Year	Title	Role	Note(s)	Ref.
2021	Voice 4	Lisa Jo (Jo Seung-ah)		
2021–2022	Artificial City	Kim Yi-seol		
2023	Black Knight	4–1		
2023	Daily Dose of Sunshine	Min Deul-re		
2025	The Queen Who Crowns	Chae-ryeong		
2026	Can This Love Be Translated?	Shin Ji-seon		
2026	The Art of Sarah	Kim Mi-jeong		
2026	Happy Anding	Go Eun-young		

== Accolades ==
=== Awards and nominations ===
Name of the award ceremony, year presented, category, nominee of the award, and the result of the nomination
Award ceremony	Year	Category	Nominee	Result	Ref.
Baeksang Arts Awards	2024	Best New Actress – Television	Daily Dose of Sunshine	Nominated	
Baeksang Arts Awards	2026	Best Supporting Actress – Television	The Art of Sarah	Nominated	
Blue Dragon Series Awards	2025	Best New Actress	The Queen Who Crowns	Nominated	
Global OTT Awards	2026	Best Supporting Actress	The Art of Sarah	Nominated	

=== Listicle ===
Name of publisher, year listed, name of listicle, and placement
Publisher	Year	Listicle	Placement	Ref.
Cine21	2023	Rising Star Actress	Placed	
