= Artificial City =

2021–2022 South Korean television series

- Promotional poster
- Also known as: Sabotage City
- Hangul: 공작도시
- Hanja: 孔雀都市
- Lit.: Peacock City
- RR: Gongjakdosi
- MR: Kongjaktosi
- Genre: Psychological; Mystery
- Created by: JTBC
- Written by: Son Se-dong
- Directed by: Jeon Chang-geun
- Starring: Soo Ae; Kim Kang-woo; Kim Mi-sook; Lee Hak-joo
- Music by: Gaemi (Music Manager)
- Country of origin: South Korea
- Original language: Korean
- No. of episodes: 20

Production
- Executive producers: A Su-beom; Jo Seong-hoon
- Producers: Hwang Ki-yong; Park Ha-ok; Han Min-jung; Jeon Ji-ho; Gam Ja-beom
- Running time: 70 minutes
- Production companies: Hi-Story D&C; JTBC Studios

Original release
- Network: JTBC
- Release: December 8, 2021 – February 10, 2022

Artificial City (Korean: 공작도시) is a South Korean television series directed by Jeon Chang-geun and starring Soo Ae, Kim Mi-sook, Kim Kang-woo and Lee Hak-joo. This psychological series is about a society whose characters have different desires and psychology, which pushes them to conceal their dark sides. It premiered on JTBC on December 8, 2021 and aired every Wednesday and Thursday at 22:30 (KST).

== Synopsis ==
A psychological mystery thriller that tells the story of things which lose their meaning when greed and power comes into play. A big conglomerate, Sungjin Group, which has clout over political and financial circles in South Korea, owns an art museum called "Space Jin". Yoon Jae-hee (Soo Ae), second daughter-in-law of the family, is in charge of the art museum. She hates poverty so she ditched her long-time lover and married Jung Joon-hyuk (Kim Kang-woo), an illegitimate son of Sungjin Group. She even fights her in-laws in order to make her husband the country's president, with the help of the future public prosecutor general. The husband poses as if he has no such ambition, but inside he waits for the day when he can have the control.

== Cast and characters ==
=== Main ===
- Soo Ae as Yoon Jae-hee

The second daughter-in-law of Sungjin Group, in-charge of 'Space Jin' art museum.

- Kim Kang-woo as Jung Joon-hyuk

Husband of Yoon Jae-hee, illegitimate son of Sungjin Group and JBC's popular anchorman.

- Kim Mi-sook as Seo Han-sook

Jung Joon-hyuk's step-mother and Chairman of the Sungjin Cultural Foundation.

- Lee E-dam as Kim Yi-seol

Docent of 'Space Jin'.

- Lee Hak-joo as Han Dong-min

JBC news reporter.

=== Supporting ===
==== People around Sungjin Group ====
- Song Young-chang as Jung Pil-sung, calligrapher, Seo Han-sook's husband and Jun-hyeok's father.
- Kim Young-jae as Jung Joon-il, Vice Chairman of Sungjin Electronics and Seo Han-sook's son.
- Kim Ji-hyun as Lee Joo-yeon, Jung Joon-il's wife and representative of 'Space Jin'.
- Lee Seo-an, as Jung Eun-jung, the youngest daughter of the Sungjin Group and an aspiring playwright.
- Kim Joo-ryoung as Go Seon-mi, Seo Han-sook's secretary.
- Jung Hee-tae as Yang Won-rok, Phil's younger brother and President of Myeongseong Construction, a demolition service company.
- Seo Woo-jin as Jung Hyun-woo, son of Jae-hee and Joon-hyuk.

==== People from outside ====
- Lee Choong-joo as Park Jeong-ho, a prosecutor at the Central District Prosecutor's Office.
- Jeong Hae-kyun as Jo Kang-hyun, Minister of Justice.
- Baek Ji-won as Kwon Min-sun, Jo Kang-hyun's wife.
- Seo Jae-hee as Oh Ye-rin, Jo Kang-hyun's girlfriend.
- Nam Gi-ae as Min Ji-young, Seo Young-ho's wife and Min Seong-sik's younger sister.
- Park Ji-il as Min Seong-sik, Min Ji-young's older brother.
- Nam Moon-cheol as Choi Hee-joong, Editor-in-Chief of 'Daily News'.
- Yeom Dong-heon as Kwak Ki-hwan, Former Police Commissioner, re-elected member of the National Police Agency.
- Yoo Jin-seok as Former Minister of Culture, Sports and Tourism.

=== Others ===
- Nam Myeong-ryeol as Yoon Jong-pil, Jae-hee's father and a former judge.
- Lee Kyu-Hyun as Park Yong-seop, a waiter.
- Park Myung-shin as Kim Myung-wan, a restaurant manager, she lives in the same neighborhood as Kim Yi-seol and takes care of her.
- Hwang Seon-hee as Noh Young-joo, entertainment worker.

=== Special appearance ===
- Kim Hyun-soo as Do Eun-young

== Production ==
In December 2020, Studio Santa Claus Entertainment, Soo Ae's agency, announced that she was offered a role in Artificial City. This would be her first drama since the 2016 series Sweet Stranger and Me. On 6 January 2021, King Entertainment announced that Kim Kang-woo was offered the leading role for the series. His last appearance was in Woman of 9.9 Billion in 2019. This is the second common project for Kim Kang-woo and Soo Ae, who had previously worked together in the 2018 film High Society and attends to 2007 Busan's International Film Festival.

Principal photography was wrapped up on 29 March 2021.

The first script reading photos were revealed on November 3, 2021.

== Original soundtrack ==
Soundtrack album by Various
- Released: 2022
- Genre: Soundtrack
- Languages: Korean; English
- Labels: Dreamus; Most content

=== Part 1 ===
Released on January 6, 2022
No.	Title	Lyrics	Music	Artist	Length
1.	"Let Me Be There"	Lee Jun-hwa	Lee Jun-hwa	Elaine	4:30
2.	"Let Me Be There" (Inst.)				4:30

=== Part 2 ===
Released on January 20, 2022
No.	Title	Lyrics	Music	Artist	Length
1.	"The Real Life"	Kyungsoo Han, Dohyeong Lee (Lohi)	Kyungsoo Han, Dohyeong Lee (Lohi)	YELO (yellow)	4:01
2.	"The Real Life" (Inst.)				4:01

=== Part 3 ===
Released on February 8, 2022
No.	Title	Lyrics	Music	Artist	Length
1.	"Alone"	Kim Beom-ju, Kim Si-hyuk	Kim Beom-joo, Kim Si-hyuk	Hajin	3:42
2.	"Alone" (Inst.)				3:42

== Viewership ==
Artificial City : South Korea viewers per episode (thousands)

Season	Episode number																				Average
Season	1	2	3	4	5	6	7	8	9	10	11	12	13	14	15	16	17	18	19	20	Average
1	701	N/A	747	612	771	671	700	N/A	752	N/A	752	N/A	789	861	720	798	684	905	839	916	N/A

Source: Audience measurement performed nationwide by Nielsen Korea

Average TV viewership ratings
Ep.	Original broadcast date	Average audience share (Nielsen Korea)	
Ep.	Original broadcast date	Nationwide	Seoul
1	December 8, 2021	3.576% (5th)	4.279% (2nd)
2	December 9, 2021	2.628% (12th)	2.920% (7th)
3	December 15, 2021	3.895% (3rd)	4.310% (2nd)
4	December 16, 2021	3.119% (12th)	3.977% (N/A)
5	December 22, 2021	4.072% (3rd)	4.697% (2nd)
6	December 23, 2021	3.166% (11th)	4.183% (4th)
7	December 29, 2021	3.561% (7th)	3.797% (4th)
8	December 30, 2021	2.977% (15th)	3.854% (6th)
9	January 5, 2022	3.414% (11th)	3.843% (5th)
10	January 6, 2022	3.221% (12th)	3.773% (9th)
11	January 12, 2022	3.929% (5th)	4.345% (2nd)
12	January 13, 2022	3.438% (12th)	3.732% (7th)
13	January 19, 2022	3.867% (8th)	4.790% (2nd)
14	January 20, 2022	4.217% (3rd)	4.582% (3rd)
15	January 26, 2022	3.784% (4th)	4.268% (2nd)
16	January 27, 2022	3.907% (6th)	4.280% (5th)
17	February 2, 2022	3.105% (10th)	3.473% (5th)
18	February 3, 2022	4.526% (3rd)	5.051% (2nd)
19	February 9, 2022	4.104% (4th)	4.642% (1st)
20	February 10, 2022	4.695% (3rd)	5.486% (3rd)
Average		3.660%	4.214%
In the table above, the blue numbers represent the lowest ratings and the red numbers represent the highest ratings.; This drama airs on a cable channel/pay TV which normally has a relatively smaller audience compared to free-to-air TV/public broadcasters (KBS, SBS, MBC and EBS).
