= Nam Gi-ae =

South Korean actress (born 1961)

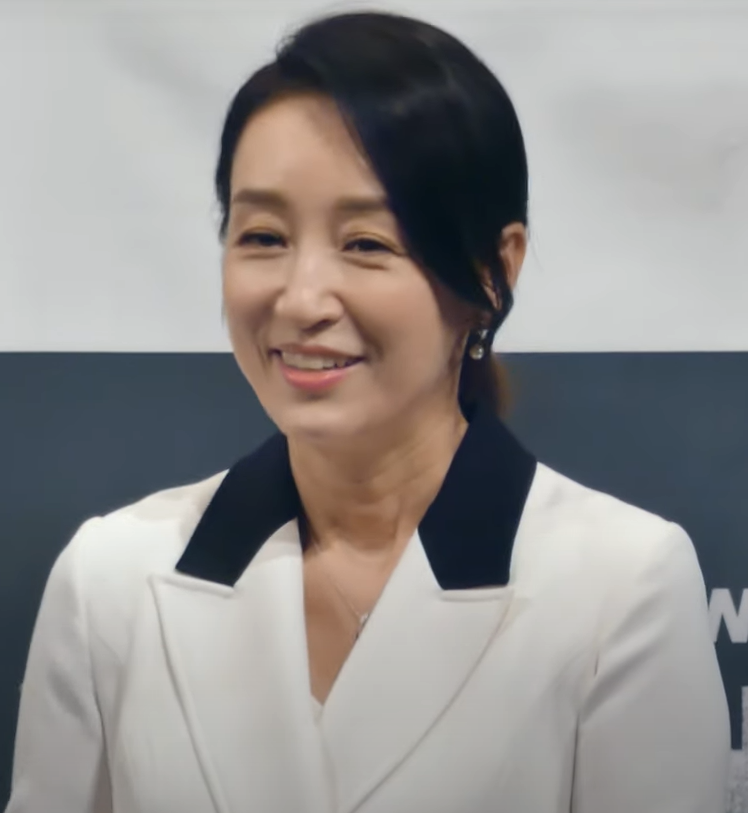
- Nam in March 2019
- Born: September 13, 1961 (age 65)
- Other names: Nam Ki-ae; Nam Nam-ae
- Occupation: Actress
- Years active: 1998–present
- Agent: Ace Factory

Korean name
- Hangul: 남기애
- Hanja: 南基愛
- RR: Nam Giae
- MR: Nam Kiae

Nam Gi-ae (Korean: 남기애; born on September 13, 1961) is a South Korean actress in Chung-Ang University, Department of Theater and Film. She made her acting debut in 1998, since then, she has appeared in number of plays, films and television series. She is known for her supporting roles in Suspicious Partner (2017), Mother (2018), Flower of Evil (2020), and Encounter (2018–19). She has acted in films such as: The Merciless (2017) and High Society (2018) among others.

== Career ==
Nam Gi-ae is affiliated to artist management company Ace Factory since 2019. She made her acting debut in plays in 1998 and her TV series debut in 2015 in All About My Mom. Since then she has appeared in supporting roles in Oh My Venus (2015), Descendants of the Sun, Another Miss Oh, and MBC TV's fantasy comedy W (2016). In 2017, she got recognition by appearing in KBS's mystery comedy Ms. Perfect, Suspicious Partner, and JTBC's melodrama Rain or Shine. In 2018, Nam was seen in tvN's suspense drama Mother, KBS TV series Love to the End, Matrimonial Chaos and tvN's romance drama Encounter.

In 2019, Nam was part of main cast in tvN's legal drama Confession. In 2020, she was cast in tvN's suspense TV series Flower of Evil. In 2021 she appeared in Sell Your Haunted House, Chimera, Jirisan, The Red Sleeve, SBS's romantic TV series Now, We Are Breaking Up as Kang Jeong-ja, mother of Song Hye-kyo's character and JTBC's mystery drama Artificial City. In 2022 she appeared in JTBC's romantic drama Thirty-Nine as mother of one of the main leads.

== Filmography ==
=== Films ===
Year	Title	Role	Notes	Ref.
2016	Snow Paths	Kim Seong-sim		
2017	The Merciless	Hyun-soo's mother		
2018	High Society	Madam 1		
2019	Exit	Lee In-sook		
2020	Pray	Yeong-ae, Jeong-in's mother		

=== Television series ===
Year	Title	Role	Notes	Ref.
2015	Oh My Ghost	Seo Bing-go's customer	Special appearance	
2015	All About My Mom	Hong Yoo-ja		
2015	Oh My Venus	Je Soon-ja		
2016	Descendants of the Sun	Kang Mo-yeon's mother		
2016	Monster	Jung Mi-ok		
2016	Another Miss Oh	Heo Ji-ya		
2016	W	Gil Soo-sun		
2016	Be Positive	Hwan-dong's mother		
2016–17	Night Light	Moon Hee-jeong		
2017	Introverted Boss			
2017	Ms. Perfect	Choi Duk-boon / Moon Hyung-sun		
2017	My Secret Romance	Jo Mi-hee		
2017	Suspicious Partner	Hong Bok-ja		
2017	Stranger	Choi Kyung-soon		
2017	Hospital Ship	Lee Soo-kyung		
2017	KBS Drama Special: "If We Were a Season"	Kim Mi-hee	Season 8, Episode 1	
2018	Rain or Shine	Joo-won's mother		
2018	Mother	Nam Hong-hee		
2018	Suits	Sim Young-joo	Special appearance	
2018	Love to the End	Ha Yeong-ok		
2018	Life	Jin-woo and Sun-woo's mother		
2018	Matrimonial Chaos	Baek Mi-yeon		
2018	Encounter	Jin Mi-ock		
2019	Haechi	Queen Inwon		
2019	Confession	Madame Jin		
2019	Catch the Ghost	Han Ae-sim		
2020	When the Weather Is Fine	Yoon Yeo-jeong		
2020	Flower of Evil	Gong Mi-ja		
2021	Sell Your Haunted House	Joo Kyeong-hee		
2021	Jirisan	Kang Hyun-jo's mother		
2021	Chimera	Cha Eun-soo		
2021	The Red Sleeve	Royal Noble Consort Yeong-bin Yi		
2021	Now, We Are Breaking Up	Kang Jeong-ja		
2021–22	Artificial City	Min Ji-yeong		
2022	Thirty-Nine	Jang Joo-hee's mother		
2022	Doctor Lawyer	Han Yi-han's mother		
2023	Call It Love	Ma Hee-ja		
2023	The Secret Romantic Guesthouse	Queen Dowager		
2023	King the Land	Han Mi-so		
2025	Salon de Holmes	Jeon Ji-hyun		
2025	Moon River	Queen Dowager Han		
2025	Surely Tomorrow	Jang Hyun-kyung		
2025	Dynamite Kiss	Kim In-ae		

== Theater ==
Year	Title	Role	Notes/Ref.
2009	Pine Tree in Front of the Yard	Mother	
2011	Scandal Gang	Mrs. Sneawell	
2012	Cola Girl	Eldest daughter-in-law	
2012	Please Turn Off the Lights	Woman	
2021	Oil	Ma Singer	
2021	Lovesong	Maggie	Abi Morgan's play
2022	Vincent River	Anita	
