= Happy Anding =

2026 South Korean television series

- Promotional poster
- Hangul: 뜨거운 안녕
- Lit.: Hot Goodbye
- RR: Tteugeoun annyeong
- MR: Ttŭgŏun annyŏng
- Genre: Coming-of-age; Comedy-drama
- Created by: Yang Hee-seung
- Based on: Life's Punchline by Shigeki Kaneko
- Written by: Ahn Ah-reum
- Directed by: Jung Ji-hyun
- Starring: Kang Hoon; Cho Hyun-chul; Kim Jeong-jin; Lee E-dam; Moonhee; Yoon Ga-i
- Country of origin: South Korea
- Original language: Korean
- No. of episodes: 4

Production
- Production company: Studio Dragon

Original release
- Network: tvN
- Release: November 11, 2026 – present

Happy Anding (Korean: 뜨거운 안녕) is an ongoing South Korean coming-of-age comedy-drama television series created by Yang Hee-seung, written by Ahn Ah-reum, directed by Jung Ji-hyun, and starring Kang Hoon, Cho Hyun-chul, Kim Jeong-jin, Lee E-dam, Moonhee, and Yoon Ga-i. The series is a remake of the 2021 Nippon Television drama Life's Punchline by Shigeki Kaneko, and is about the Asura trio racing toward their dreams who meet a mysterious woman and find their respective tomorrows. It premiered on tvN on November 11, 2026, and airs every Wednesday and Thursday at 22:50 (KST). It is also available for streaming on TVING.

== Cast and characters ==
=== Main ===
- Kang Hoon as Kang Tae-gu

The leader and breadwinner of the Asura trio. A natural comedian who has spent ten years in obscurity pursuing his craft, he works multiple odd jobs—including daytime delivery work—to support himself. He faces a growing dilemma between continuing his comedic ambitions and considering the livelihoods of his friends and family.

- Cho Hyun-chul as Kim Nam-il

A member of the Asura trio and Tae-gu's longtime friend since high school. Unlike his peers, he has been in a ten-year relationship with Na-yeon, whom he pursued after she praised his comedic performance in high school. He faces a personal conflict between his loyalty to the comedy group and his insecurity about his relationship, feeling that he has become an obstacle to Na-yeon's future while a successful coworker pursues her.

- Kim Jeong-jin as Han Jun-seo

Another member of the Asura trio who manages the group's finances and household. Despite projecting a gentle and peaceful demeanor, he is secretly the son of a hospital director from a wealthy background who dropped out of medical school to pursue comedy with his friends. He views Tae-gu and Nam-il as his chosen family, making him reluctant to accept the group's impending disbandment.

- Lee E-dam as Go Eun-young

A reclusive woman who has lived in isolation due to past trauma and societal hardships, particularly experiences as a contract worker from a regional university. While observing the Asura trio from her window, she develops a secret fandom for them and becomes determined to intervene when they announce their sudden disbandment.

- Moonhee as Lee Na-yeon

Nam-il's girlfriend, who is intelligent, accomplished, and from a good background, she chose Nam-il after a long courtship. Despite growing tensions regarding his career struggles and increasing arguments, she remains committed to protecting their relationship.

- Yoon Ga-i as Go Ji-young

Eun-young's younger sister, who works as a casual piano player and social butterfly. After putting her life on hold to care for her reclusive sister, she discovers the Asura trio and finds renewed personal inspiration in their resilience.

=== Supporting ===
- Jeon Bae-soo as Kang Min-gi

The owner of a small auto repair shop and Tae-gu's father. He carries long-standing guilt after saving a young Tae-gu during a sudden unintended acceleration accident that left his older son disabled. Consequently, he pushes Tae-gu hard to face reality, knowing that the responsibility of caring for the family will eventually fall on him.

- Oh Eui-shik as Kang Hyeon-gu

Tae-gu's older brother, who lost a leg in a vehicle accident twenty years ago and suffers from chronic phantom limb pain. Despite helping out at his father's repair shop due to his physical limitations, he remains resilient and serves as a supportive emotional bridge between his stern father and Tae-gu.

- Kim Dong-yoon as Han Kang-chan

Jun-seo's father and the director of Yechan Hospital, hailing from a long line of physicians. He blames Tae-gu and Nam-il for Jun-seo's departure from a medical career and has spent a decade waiting for his son to abandon his comedy pursuits and return home.

- Lee Eun-jung as Oh Seon-hui

Na-yeon's mother, who once fond of Nam-il for his devotion to her daughter, she has grown resentful of his decade-long pursuit of an unsuccessful comedy career and now favors Tae-hun as a more stable match for Na-yeon.

- Shin Hyun-soo as Jeong Tae-hun

Na-yeon's coworker and office colleague. With an impressive background, career, and personality, he is deeply devoted to Na-yeon, making him a major source of insecurity and rivalry for Nam-il.

- Lee Seo-hwan as Jeong Man-sik

A former high school teacher and the current owner of Man-sik's Skewer Shop. As the former head of student affairs who originally pushed the trio into performing at a school festival, he now runs a restaurant where he feeds the struggling comedians for free, acting as a devoted supporter despite frequently grumbling about them.

- Kwon Seung-woo as Min Ji-hu

A producer at QBN Broadcasting who has admired the Asura trio since his days as an assistant director. Believing in their unique comedic potential and the passion they inspire, he offers them a new opportunity upon becoming the main producer for the comedy program Gag Jirak.

- Go Geon-han as Hwang Chan-seong

A popular comedian and public recruitment contemporary of the Asura trio. While Asura started as acclaimed rookies and Chan-seong lagged behind, he worked relentlessly to shed his loser label and achieve top-tier stardom. Despite his luxurious and successful life, he harbors deep feelings of emptiness and resentment toward Asura's enduring bond.

- TBA as Park Gyeong-su

The head of the entertainment bureau at QBN Broadcasting. Driven by a strict ratings-first philosophy, he constantly worries about popular comedian Hwang Chan-seong defecting to a rival network, leading him to engage in unscrupulous behavior that frequently creates hardships for the Asura trio.

- Bae Woo-myung as Park Gu-yeong

A veteran producer at QBN Broadcasting known for poor instincts and an even poorer personality. Distracted by watching the stock market during the day and schmoozing with industry figures at night, he is eventually passed over and loses the main producer position for Gag Jirak to a much younger junior colleague, Ji-hu.

== Production ==
=== Development ===
The series was developed under the working title Asura Balbalta (아수라 발발타). It was reported that director Jung Ji-hyun, whose previous credits include Search: WWW (2019), Twenty-Five Twenty-One (2022), and Dear Hyeri (2024), and screenwriter Ahn Ah-reum, who previously wrote the weekend drama Once Again (2020), would helmed and penned the series, respectively. Produced by Studio Dragon, it was reported to be a 12-episode series for the tvN's Wednesday and Thursday time slot.

In March 2026, it was announced that Studio Dragon had licensed the adaptation rights from Nippon Television to remake the Japanese drama series Life's Punchline.

=== Casting ===
In January 2025, Kang Hoon was first reported to be cast for the series and would mark Kang's reunion with director Jung following their work on Dear Hyeri. This was followed by the casting of Lee Yi-dam and Cho Hyun-chul. The following month, Yoon Ga-i was also cast.

In October 2026, the four actors along with Kim Jeong-jin and Moonhee were confirmed to play various lead roles while Oh Eui-shik, Kwon Seung-woo, and Lee Seo-hwan for supporting roles.

=== Filming ===
Principal photography began in the first half of 2025.

== Release ==
Happy Anding was originally scheduled to air on tvN in the second half of 2025, but was subsequently excluded from the network's final lineup for that year. The series was later confirmed to premiere as a Friday–Saturday drama on November 6, 2026, at 22:30 (KST), before it was changed to a Wednesday and Thursday timeslot at 22:50 (KST) starting November 11. It is also available for streaming on TVING in South Korea.

== Viewership ==
Happy Anding : South Korea viewers per episode (thousands)

Season	Episode number												Average
Season	1	2	3	4	5	6	7	8	9	10	11	12	Average
1	359	373	284	325	TBD	TBD	TBD	TBD	TBD	TBD	TBD	TBD	TBD

Source: Audience measurement performed nationwide by Nielsen Korea.

Average TV viewership ratings
Ep.	Original broadcast date	Average audience share (Nielsen Korea)	
Ep.	Original broadcast date	Nationwide	Seoul
1	November 11, 2026	1.7% (4th)	1.8% (4th)
2	November 12, 2026	1.7% (2nd)	1.6% (2nd)
3	November 18, 2026	1.3% (4th)	1.4% (4th)
4	November 19, 2026	1.4% (6th)	1.3% (7th)
5	November 25, 2026		
6	November 26, 2026		
7	December 2, 2026		
8	December 3, 2026		
9	December 9, 2026		
10	December 10, 2026		
11	December 16, 2026		
12	December 17, 2026		
Average		—	—
In the table above, the blue numbers represent the lowest ratings and the red numbers represent the highest ratings.; This drama airs on a cable channel/pay TV which normally has a relatively smaller audience compared to free-to-air TV/public broadcasters (KBS, SBS, MBC, and EBS).
