= Lee Su-chang =

South Korean painter

Lee Su-Chang
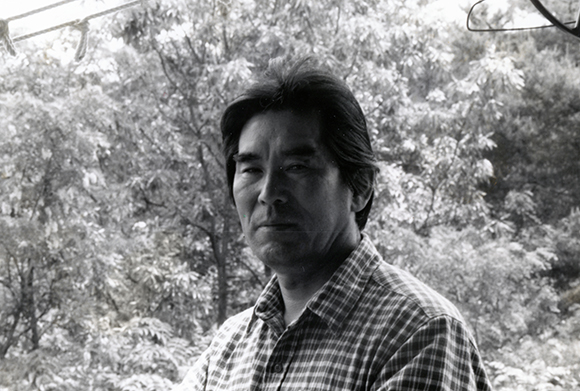
- Born: February 9, 1929; Uiseong, Gyeongsangbuk-do, Korea
- Died: June 24, 2013 (aged 84)
- Occupations: Artist, watercolor painter, professor
- Notable work: Toegyeosolgil

Lee Su-Chang (Korean: 이수창; Hanja: 李洙昌; 1929 – 2013) was a South Korean artist, watercolor painter, and professor. He was born in Yeongcheon county, Gyeongbuk Province, Korea.

== Early life and education ==
Su-Chang studied under Son Il-Bong at Gyeongju Art School. He worked as an art teacher at Gyeongbook High School, Andong College of Instruction, Andong University of Education, and Andong National University.

== Career ==
Su-Chang's teaching career began in 1954. He co-founded an artist group called "Hyangmihoe", along with Kim Im-sook, Kwon Young-ho, Yu Si-Won, Park Gi-Tae, Lee Sang-Gil, and others.

== Artistic style ==
In one of his writings, Su-Chang wrote the following about “first-class art”:

Throughout human history, regardless of where and when it should be remarked that every artwork renowned as a masterpiece possesses two common factors; the first being that the artist’s stance towards the artwork and its content should remain consistently diligent; the second being that the artist’s thoughts palpably infect its audience.

This idea seems to have become a sort of code that permeates the artistic world of Lee. If there is one thing that Lee has insisted on time and time again throughout his life, it is “diligence” by which artists approach their work and the “meaningful response” to their work. The aforementioned assertion is more of a “general outline” that broadly describes his works and not the “particular” that explores his oeuvres in detail.
