= Two Outs in the Ninth Inning =

2007 South Korean television series

- Also known as: 9 End 2 Outs; Two Outs, Bottom of the 9th Inning; Bottom of the 9th with 2 Outs
- Hangul: 9회말 2아웃
- Hanja: 9回末 2아웃
- RR: 9hoemal 2aut
- MR: 9hoemal 2aut
- Genre: Romance; Comedy
- Written by: Yeo Ji-na
- Directed by: Han Chul-soo
- Starring: Soo Ae; Lee Jung-jin; Lee Tae-sung; Hwang Ji-hyun
- Country of origin: South Korea
- Original language: Korean
- No. of episodes: 16

Production
- Executive producers: Jo Joong-hyun; Yoon Shin-ae; Jung Young-beom
- Producer: Hyun Chung-yeol
- Production location: Korea
- Running time: 60 minutes
- Production companies: Appletree Pictures; IJ Entertainment 02

Original release
- Network: Munhwa Broadcasting Corporation
- Release: July 14 – September 9, 2007

Two Outs in the Ninth Inning (Korean: 9회말 2아웃) is a 2007 South Korean television series starring Soo Ae, Lee Jung-jin, Lee Tae-sung and Hwang Ji-hyun. It aired on MBC from July 14 to September 9, 2007 on Saturdays and Sundays at 21:40 for 16 episodes.

The romantic comedy series explores the age-old question of whether a man and a woman can ever be just friends. As the title suggests, the series makes plenty of baseball references, with each of its sixteen episodes opening with a catchy phrase relating the facts of life through the game of baseball.

== Plot ==
Aspiring writer Hong Nan-hee is a foul-mouthed, disheveled and jaded single woman struggling with life and love. She and Byun Hyung-tae have been best friends for most of their lives. They cook for each other, call each other daily, bicker like siblings, and support each other when things go wrong. But everything is about to change. On her 30th birthday, Nan-hee realizes that she needs to shake things up. She begins dating Kim Jung-joo, a talented baseball pitcher who is aiming to play in the American big leagues; but Nan-hee's mother disapproves of their relationship because he is eight years younger. Tired of living with her mother, she rents Hyung-tae's house while he is on vacation, but complications arise and soon the two friends are living in the house together. As the old friends navigate new territory, they start to discover things they never knew about each other — he's neurotic, she snores — but more importantly, they gradually realize what their friends and family have always suspected — that, without realizing it, they've been the most important people to each other all along.

== Cast ==
- Soo Ae as Hong Nan-hee
- Lee Jung-jin as Byun Hyung-tae
- Lee Tae-sung as Kim Jung-joo
- Hwang Ji-hyun as Yoon Sung-ah
- Lee Sang-woo as Lee Joon-mo
- Jo Eun-ji as Kim Choon-hee
- Son Jung-min as Jeon Mi-kyung
- Jang Joon-hwi as Park Sang-hoon
- Park Hye-young as Park Ji-sun
- Hwang Seok-jeong as Jang Choo-ja
- Lee Doo-il as Im Nak-bin
- Im Yoon-ah as Shin Joo-young
- Kim Chang-sook as Kim Shin-ja
- Lee Hee-do as Byun Jong-woo
- Lee So-won as Hong Yeon-hee
- Park Kwang-jung as Mr. Park, advertisement team leader
- Jeong Da-hye as Kim Nam-jung
- Yoon Ye-hee as Kyung-ha
- Yoon Hye-jung
- Park Woo-cheon
