= Shin Se-hwi =

South Korean actress (born 1997)

- Born: June 3, 1997 (age 29); Jincheon County, South Korea
- Other name: Shin Se-hui
- Education: Kaywon University of Art and Design
- Occupations: Actress; model
- Years active: 2016–present
- Agent: Koo Management
- Known for: Sweet Stranger and Me; Solomon's Perjury; Children of the 20th Century

Korean name
- Hangul: 신세휘
- Hanja: 申世輝
- RR: Sin Sehwi
- MR: Sin Sehwi

Shin Se-hwi (Korean: 신세휘; born June 3, 1997) is a South Korean actress and model. She is best known for her roles in dramas such as Solomon's Perjury, Sweet Stranger and Me and Children of the 20th Century.

== Biography and career ==
Shin Se-hwi is a South Korean actress and model. She made her debut in the drama, Sweet Stranger and Me. She first attracted attention after appearing on The Brave Teenagers and briefly on iKON's "My Type" music video. She is also called "Little Han Hyo-joo" and "Second Han Hyo-joo" by Korean netizens.

== Filmography ==
=== Film ===
Year	Title	Role	Ref.
2017	Part-Time Spy	Lee Ji-eun	
2018	Brothers in Heaven	Chan-mi	
2018	Ordinary People	Han Soo-yeon	
2019	Exit	Yong-hye	
2023	Ballerina	High school student	
2024	Walker	Yeon-hee	

=== Television series ===
Year	Title	Role	Ref.
2016	Sweet Stranger and Me	Kwon Deok-shim	
2016–2017	Solomon's Perjury	Lee Joo-ri	
2017	Hello, My Twenties! 2	An Ye-ji	
2017	Children of the 20th Century	Lee Ha-ram	
2019	When You Love Yourself 2	Go Yu-mi	
2020	Men Are Men	You-gyo Girl	
2020	Romance Bible	Se-hui	
