= April Kiss =

2004 South Korean TV series

- Hangul: 4월의 키스
- RR: 4worui kiseu
- MR: 4wŏrŭi k'isŭ
- Starring: Soo Ae; Jo Han-sun; Lee Jung-jin; So Yi-hyun
- Country of origin: South Korea
- No. of episodes: 24

Production
- Producers: Lee Eung-jin, Choi Ji-young
- Running time: Wednesday & Thursday 21:50

Original release
- Network: KBS
- Release: April 21 – July 8, 2004

April Kiss (Korean: 4월의 키스), also called Kiss of April, is a South Korean TV drama that aired from April 21 to July 8, 2004 on KBS.

== Plot ==
Kang Jae-seop (Jo Han-sun) and Song Chae-won (Soo-ae) are close friends. Jae-seop has a crush on Chae-won.

In high school, the righteous and charming Jae-seop and the brave Chae-won feel attracted to each other. Then, when Jung-woo, who comes from a wealthy family and has a gentle personality, transfers to the school, the three people's relationships become entangled. Jung-woo and Chae-won fall in love, but when Jae-seop's younger brother steals Jung-woo's letter, the two drift apart.

13 years later, Jae-seop becomes a director of Daejin Group and Chae-won meets again as an art academy instructor. Jae-seop still loves only Chae-won, and Jung-woo and Chae-won meet again as if by fate. However, Chae-won rejects Jung-woo and stays by Jae-seop's side. Jung-woo and Chae-won become close again after a misunderstanding, an accident, and a liver transplant. However, Jung-woo suffers from amnesia, and Chae-won still loves him.

Chae-won asks Jae-seop to help Jung-woo regain his memories, and Jae-seop eventually leaves, exhausted. Chae-won continues to misunderstand and pushes Jae-seop away, and her relationship with Jung-woo also goes wrong. Later, Jung-woo's memories return, but Chae-won's heart is already turned to Jae-seop.

In the end, Chae-won goes to see Jae-seop, but he is already too hurt to accept it. Jae-seop returns to work and accepts Chae-won's proposal, but he is diagnosed with terminal cancer and leaves. Chae-won and Jeong-woo return to Seoul together to find him, but Jae-seop dies in a car accident.

Two years later, Jeong-woo and Jin-ah reconnect, and Chae-won finally realizes that Jae-seop was her destiny.

== Cast ==
=== Main ===
- Soo Ae - Song Chae-won
  - Seon Ji-hyun as young Song Chae-won

A charming woman, who is also talented in arts. She majored in sculpture in college, and currently teaches at her private art school. One of the things that she cherishes the most is a pair of paddy birds that she received as a gift from her middle-school boyfriend. Every time Chae-won looks at the birds, she comes to recall her middle-school love. But she can't figure out if her feelings for Jeong-woo, her middle-class boyfriend, are her affection for him or simply a piece of memory. However, one thing is clear: she is currently with the guy named Kang Jae-sup. But one day, Jeong-woo shows up, and the two men find themselves embroiled in a whirlpool of love.

- Jo Han-sun - Kang Jae-sup
  - Yoo Ah-in as young Kang Jae-sup

A man who possesses the charisma of an eagle. He learned about the importance of hard work and patience at a very young age. He succeeded in becoming a director at a renowned corporation solely through his hard work and abilities, and he firmly believes that everything in life is possible through a hard work. Jae-sup spent his childhood in utter poverty, and now he desperately strives to become rich and famous. One day, he even learns how to bake, and bakes a cake for Chae-won, who becomes very impressed. When his older brother, Jae-dong, who was always treated coldly by their father, tells him about his decision to marry a terminally ill woman, a café owner, who has only two years to live, Jae-sup eagerly supports his brother. Through that support, Jae-sup probably endeavors to realize his own yearning for a destined love.

- Lee Jung-jin - Han Jeong-woo
  - Kim Ki-bum as young Han Jeong-woo

He has an aloof and careless personality, like a stork. But at the same time, he is a romantic and unceremonious person who seems to live apart from the tumult of the world and easily adapts to circumstances. He was raised in a financially well-off family, and he doesn't yearn for success that much. He believes that life is too short not to enjoy it and indulges in the pleasures of life, spending most of his time on his hobbies. He enjoys riding a bicycle in the forest and looking at birds. But one day, his life changes dramatically because of Chae-won and Jae-sup, and something that brings him to ruin.

- So Yi-hyun - Jang Jin-ah

A daughter of the owner of Daejin Group, Jang Jin-ah is director of the Design Department and a college senior of Chae-won. She has an outgoing and self-confident personality underscored by her sophisticated looks. Since her childhood, she has despised her father's indulgence in women. That is why she does not believe in love and does not trust men. But the day she meets Jeong-woo, Jin-ah finds herself attracted to his unique romantic personality and good sense of humor.

=== Supporting ===
- Koo Jun-yup as Kang Jae-dong
- Lee Yoon-sung as Shim Soon-young
- Kim In-moon as Kang Woon-bong, Jae-sup's father
- Kwon Kwi-ok as Hong Mi-ryun
- Lee Jung-gil as Dr. Han Tae-joon, Jeong-woo's father
- Lee Hye-sook as Oh Shin-ja
- Shin Choong-sik as Song Young-man, Chae-won's mother
- Park Soon-chun as Seo In-sook, Jeong-woo's mother
- Han In-soo as Chairman Jang Kap-sool
- Kim Ji-yoo as Kang Jae-hee
- Jang Tae-sung as Noh Kong-tak
- Song Yoon-kyung as Han Jung-yeon
