= Park Joo-hee =

South Korean actress (born 1987)

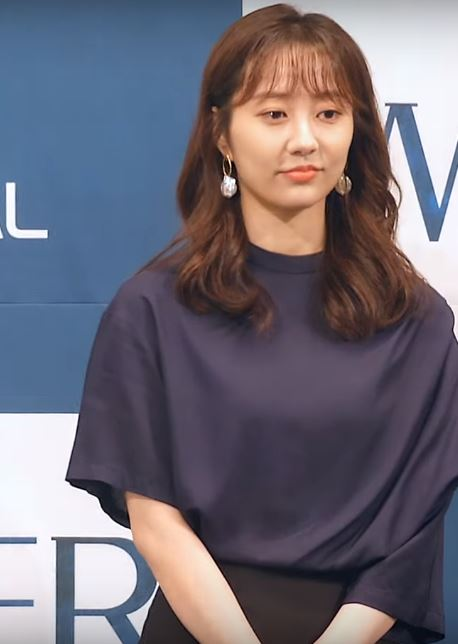
- Park in 2019
- Born: 28 August 1987 (age 39); South Korea
- Other name: Park Ju-hee
- Education: Konkuk University (Bachelor of Film)
- Occupation: Actress
- Years active: 2009–present
- Agent(s): Plum A&C
- Known for: Happiness; Watcher; The Ghost Detective

Park Joo-hee is a South Korean actress. She is known for her roles in dramas such as Tomorrow, with You, The Ghost Detective, My Golden Life, Watcher and Happiness. She also appeared in movies Set Me Free, Illang: The Wolf Brigade and High Society.

== Filmography ==
=== Television series ===
| Year | Title | Role | Ref. |
|---|---|---|---|
| 2016 | The Good Wife | Do Han-na | |
| 2017 | Tomorrow, with You | Shin Se-young | |
| 2017 | My Golden Life | Lee Soo-ah | |
| 2018 | Drama Stage: "Push and Out of Prison" | Sun-kyung | |
| 2018 | The Ghost Detective | Baek Da-hye | |
| 2019 | Watcher | Jo Soo-yeon | |
| 2020 | Run On | Hui-jin | |
| 2021 | Oh My Ladylord | Oh Hee-jung | |
| 2021 | Happiness | Lee Ji-soo | |
| 2022 | The Distributors | Lee Sang-hee | |
| 2024 | Goodbye Earth | Lee Chae-hwan | |

=== Film ===
| Year | Title | Role |
|---|---|---|
| 2010 | The Trip | Kyung-mi |
| 2010 | Read My Lips | Joo-hee |
| 2013 | Nobody's Daughter Haewon | Student |
| 2013 | If You Were Me 6 | Yeon-joo |
| 2014 | The World of If | Joo-hee |
| 2014 | The Wicked | Shin Se-young |
| 2014 | Romance in Seoul | Yeong-jo |
| 2014 | Set Me Free | Yoon-mi |
| 2015 | The Shelter | Park Sun-ju |
| 2015 | Shame Diary | Yeon-kyung |
| 2016 | If You Were Me 7 | Se-ah |
| 2016 | Queen of Walking | Soo-ji |
| 2018 | Illang: The Wolf Brigade | Hong Jung-hee |
| 2018 | High Society | Reporter Yoon |
| 2022 | How Have You Been | Yoon-kyeong |

== Awards and nominations ==
Name of the award ceremony, year presented, category, nominee of the award, and the result of the nomination
| Award ceremony | Year | Category | Result | Ref. |
|---|---|---|---|---|
| 30th Busan International Short Film Festival Acting Award | 2013 | Best Actress | Won | |
| 13th Mise-en-scène Short Film Festival Jury Special Award for Acting | 2014 | Best Actress in Film | Won | |
| 12th Seoul International Love Film Festival Actor Award | 2015 | Best Actress | Won | |
| 37th Golden Cinematography Awards | 2017 | Best Female Award | Won | |
