= Wedding Campaign =

- Poster for Wedding Campaign
- Hangul: 나의 결혼 원정기
- Hanja: 나의 結婚 遠征記
- RR: Naui gyeolhon wonjeonggi
- MR: Naŭi kyŏrhon wŏnjŏnggi
- Directed by: Hwang Byung-guk
- Written by: Yun Soon-yong; Choi Jong-hyun; Hwang Byung-guk; Kim Eun-chae; Lee Jeong-eun
- Produced by: Choi Moon-soo
- Starring: Jung Jae-young; Soo Ae; Yoo Jun-sang
- Cinematography: Lee Doo-man
- Edited by: Kim Hyeon
- Music by: Kim Hong-jib
- Production companies: Tube Entertainment; Tube Pictures
- Distributed by: Lotte Entertainment
- Release date: November 23, 2005
- Running time: 120 minutes
- Country: South Korea
- Language: Korean
- Box office: US$2,561,613

Wedding Campaign is 2005 South Korean film about two aging bachelor farmers from Gyeongsang Province. Unable to find wives in Korea willing to move to the countryside, they go on a 10-day "campaign" in Uzbekistan, where local matchmakers attempt to pair them up with local ethnic Korean women. It was the closing film of the 2005 Pusan International Film Festival.

== Plot ==
Hong Man-taek is a 38-year-old bachelor who at his age is still unable to meet eyes with a woman. Whenever his mother complains "Never had luck with men, never had luck with sons," he feels guilty about not having found a bride yet. Man-taek's old friend Hee-chul thinks he is a lady killer, but he's only a bit more experienced than his basket case friend. Urged on by his grandfather, the two bachelor buddies embark on a matchmaking journey to Uzbekistan to find wives. The trip to Uzbekistan begins with anxiety and hope. While Hee-chul musters all his suaveness and broken English to appeal to the women, Man-taek gets rejected again and again. Even more frustrated than Man-taek himself is Lara, their matchmaker-cum-interpreter. There is a special reason why she must find a bride for Man-taek, and she decides to give special private lessons on language and manners to achieve their common goal.

== Cast ==
- Jung Jae-young as Hong Man-taek
- Soo Ae as Kim Lara
- Yoo Jun-sang as Hee-chul
- Kwon Tae-won as co. president
- Park Kil-soo as Doo-sik
- Kim Eung-soo as village elder
- Kim Jin-goo as Chun-bo's mother
- Kim Ji-young as Man-taek's mother
- Jeon Sang-jin as Sang-jin
- Shin Eun-kyung as Alona
- Kim Won-sik as young Man-taek
- Jung Tae-woo as young Hee-chul
- Kim Sung-kyum as Man-taek's grandfather
- Kim Ji-young as bride

== See also ==
- Mail-order bride
