= Seo Woo-jin =

South Korean actor (born 2015)

- Born: 23 July 2015 (age 11); Seoul, South Korea
- Occupations: Actor; model
- Years active: 2016–present
- Awards: Best Young Actor at 2021 KBS Drama Awards

Korean name
- Hangul: 서우진
- Hanja: 徐宇真
- RR: Seo Ujin
- MR: Sŏ Ujin

Seo Woo-jin (Note: In this Korean name, the family name is Seo.) (Korean: 서우진; born 23 July 2015) is a South Korean child actor and model, who appeared in dramas such as The Light in Your Eyes, VIP and Love with Flaws. He is best known for his roles as Cho Seo-woo - daughter of Kim Tae-hee's character in Hi Bye, Mama! (2020) and Lee Se-jong - youngest son of the protagonist played by Ji Hyun-woo in Young Lady and Gentleman (2021).

== Career ==
Seo Woo-jin debuted in 2017 in KBS2's Confession Couple. He appeared in OCN Save Me 2 (2019) and tvN's Hi Bye, Mama! (2020), the latter role where he played a girl, Cho Seo-woo, who is the daughter of the protagonist, Cha Yu-ri, who is portrayed by Kim Tae-hee. Seo was cast due to his striking resemblance to Kim as well as his stable acting abilities, although his costumes, dresses and long hair had some netizens concerned about gender identity.

In 2021, he made his face known by appearing in weekend drama Young Lady and Gentleman as 6 year old cute kindergartener. For his portrayal as the role of the youngest son of the main lead Ji Hyun-woo, he won Best Young Actor award at 2021 KBS Drama Awards.

By 2022 he has appeared in 19 works over the past 6 years. He is appearing in iHQ's romance thriller TV series Sponsor, which began airing from February 23.

== Filmography ==
=== Film ===
Year	Title	Role	Notes	Ref.
TBA	God's Choice		American Film	

=== Television series ===
Year	Title	Role	Ref.
2016	Sweet Stranger and Me		
2017	Confession Couple		
2018	My Contracted Husband, Mr. Oh		
2018	Gangnam Scandal		
2019	The Light in Your Eyes	Lee Dae-sang (young)	
2019	Save Me 2	Seo-joon	
2019	Search: WWW		
2019	VIP	Seo-jin	
2019	Love with Flaws	Joo Seo-joon (young)	
2020	Love with Flaws	Joo Seo-joon (young)	
2020	Hi Bye, Mama!	Cho Seo-woo	
2020	The King: Eternal Monarch	Prime Minister's son	
2020	Lonely Enough to Love	Kim Min	
2020	Man in a Veil	Lee Min-woo / Choi Min-woo / Han Dong-ho	
2021	Mouse	Young Jae-hoon	
2021	At a Distance, Spring Is Green	Young Yeo-Joon	
2021	The Devil Judge	Child Kang Isaac	
2021–2022	Young Lady and Gentleman	Lee Se-jong	
2021–2022	Artificial City	Jung Hyun-woo	
2022	Sponsor	Hyun-jin-young	
2022	Love (ft. Marriage and Divorce) 3	ghost	
2022	A Model Family	Park Hyun-woo (young)	
2022	Under the Queen's Umbrella	Grand Heir Won Son	
2023	Brain Works	Shin Ha-roo	
2023	My Man Is Cupid	Elementary school student	
2024	Doctor Slump	young Yeo Jeong-woo	
2024	Wedding Impossible	Choi Ji-o	
2024	The Midnight Studio	Im Yoon-hae	
2024	Marry Me	Bong San-i	

=== Television shows ===
Year	Title	Role	Notes	Ref.
2022	KBS Creative Song Contest	Host	with Park So-hyun and Yoo Min-sang	
2022	Children's Taste, Dongchimi	Cast Member	Chuseok special	

== Awards and nominations ==
Name of the award ceremony, year presented, category, nominee of the award, and the result of the nomination
Award ceremony	Year	Category	Nominee / Work	Result	Ref.
Asia Model Awards	2021	Kids Star Award	Young Lady and Gentleman	Won	
KBS Drama Awards	2020	Best Young Actor	Man in a Veil	Nominated	
KBS Drama Awards	2021	Best Young Actor	Young Lady and Gentleman	Won	
