= Chimera (South Korean TV series) =

2021 South Korean thriller television series

- Promotional poster
- Hangul: 키마이라
- RR: Kimaira
- MR: K'imaira
- Genre: Crime thriller
- Created by: OCN (Plan Production)
- Written by: Lee Jin-mae
- Directed by: Kim Do-hoon
- Starring: Park Hae-soo; Lee Hee-joon; Claudia Kim
- Music by: Kim Jun-seok
- Country of origin: South Korea
- Original language: Korean
- No. of episodes: 16

Production
- Executive producer: Lee Kyung-seok (CP)
- Producer: Lee Jin-seok
- Production company: JS Pictures
- Budget: ₩13 billion (~US$11.089 million)

Original release
- Network: OCN
- Release: October 30 – December 19, 2021

Chimera (Korean: 키마이라; RR: Kimaira) (Note: In Greek mythology, Chimera is a monstrous fire-breathing hybrid creature.) is a South Korean television series directed by Kim Do-hoon and written by Lee Jin-mae. Starring Park Hae-soo, Lee Hee-joon and Claudia Kim, the series tells the story of three leading characters who dig through secrets of the past 30 years to find a culprit named 'Chimera'. It aired every Saturday and Sunday at 22:30 on OCN from October 30 to December 19, 2021. (KST).

== Synopsis ==
The title of the drama is borrowed from Greek mythology. Chimera is the name of a monster that has the head of a lion, the body of a goat, and the tail of a snake, and breathes fire through its mouth.

An explosion took place in the past. That explosion led to a serial murder case known as the Chimera case. 35 years later, a similar explosion takes place.

== Cast ==
=== Main ===
- Park Hae-soo as Cha Jae-hwan, 35 years old, a perfectionist homicide detective
- Lee Hee-joon as Lee Joong-yeob, a surgeon
- Claudia Kim as Eugene Hathaway, a profiler from the FBI

=== Supporting ===
==== People around Cha Jae-Hwan ====
- Nam Gi-ae as Cha Eun-soo, 60 years old, Jae-hwan's mother
- Kang Shin-il as Han Joo-seok, 60 years old, head of the Violent Crimes division

==== Joongsan West Special investigation headquarters ====
- Woo Hyun as Bae Seung-gwan, 60 years old, Joongsan Police Chief
- Heo Jun-seok as Go Kwang-soo, 38 years old, head of the Special Investigation Headquarters
- Kwon Hyuk-hyun as Lee Geon-yeong, 29 years old, representative of a powerful team of special investigations. A young detective who is best friends with Jae-hwan. He is jealous of Eugene, former FBI agent
- Yoon Ji-won as Jang Ha-na, 29 years old, an agent of the special investigation team. She is good at computers and works in an image analysis room
- Kim Ji-hoon as Jo Han-cheol, 42 years old, homicide detective
- Jung Young-ki as Im Pil-seong, 38 years old, homicide detective

==== Seo-ryun group ====
- Kim Gwi-sun as Lee Min-ki, 64 years old, Member of Parliament
- Kim Ho-jung as Lee Hwa-jeong, 58 years old, president of Seoryun Hospital
- Lee Ki-young as Seo Hyun-tae, 64 years old, Chairman of Seo-ryun Group

=== Others ===
- Cha Joo-young as Kim Hyo-kyeong, 35 years old, an elite reporter belonging to the investigative reporting team of a broadcasting company
- Lee Seung-hoon as Ham Yong-bok, a former detective who was involved in the Chimera investigation with Joo-joo and Seung-gwan, and now owns a beauty salon.
- Han Ji-wan as Ryu Sung-hee

== Production ==
The filming of the series, produced at a cost of ₩13 billion, was temporarily halted in June 2019 due to sexual harassment allegations. An assistant director (the offender) and producer were fired as a result. Production company JS Pictures issued an apology to the victim (a writer) and the cast and crew.

The series was slated for release in the second half of 2019, but did not air until October 2021 for unspecified reasons.

== Viewership ==
Chimera : South Korea viewers per episode (thousands)

Season	Episode number																Average
Season	1	2	3	4	5	6	7	8	9	10	11	12	13	14	15	16	Average
1	N/A	N/A	N/A	N/A	N/A	N/A	N/A	319	N/A	395	N/A	433	N/A	427	N/A	524	TBD

Source: Audience measurement performed nationwide by Nielsen Korea

Average TV viewership ratings
Ep.	Original broadcast date	Average audience share	
Ep.	Original broadcast date	Nationwide	Seoul
1	October 30, 2021	0.949%	N/A
2	October 31, 2021	1.352%	1.741%
3	November 6, 2021	0.868%	N/A
4	November 7, 2021	1.084%	N/A
5	November 13, 2021	1.002%	N/A
6	November 14, 2021	1.427%	1.515%
7	November 20, 2021	0.935%	N/A
8	November 21, 2021	1.571%	N/A
9	November 27, 2021	1.101%	N/A
10	November 28, 2021	2.108% (5th)	2.075% (2nd)
11	December 4, 2021	1.239%	N/A
12	December 5, 2021	2.088%	1.915%
13	December 11, 2021	1.185%	N/A
14	December 12, 2021	2.018% (4th)	1.935% (4th)
15	December 18, 2021	1.744% (N/A)	(N/A)
16	December 19, 2021	2.390% (N/A)	2.423% (N/A)
Average		%	%
In the table above, the blue numbers represent the lowest ratings and the red numbers represent the highest ratings.; This drama airs on a cable channel/pay TV which normally has a relatively smaller audience compared to free-to-air TV/public broadcasters (KBS, SBS, MBC and EBS).
