= Soo Ae =

South Korean actress (born 1979)

- 박수애
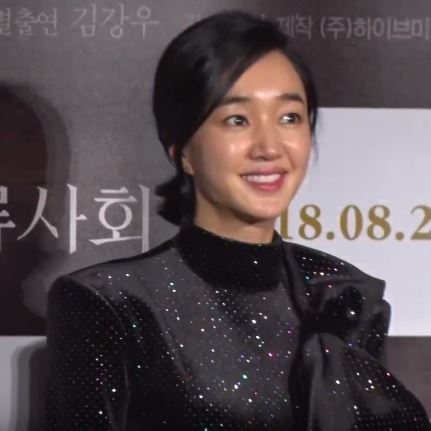
- Soo Ae in 2018
- Born: Park Soo-ae; 16 September 1979 (age 47); Bongcheon-dong, Gwanak District, Seoul, South Korea
- Other name: Su Ae
- Occupation: Actress
- Years active: 1999–present
- Agent(s): Nexus E&M

Korean name
- Hangul: 박수애
- Hanja: 朴秀愛
- RR: Bak Suae
- MR: Pak Suae

Park Soo-ae (Korean: 박수애; born 16 September 1979), known mononymously as Soo Ae, is a South Korean actress. She began her career on television, but after her breakout role in A Family (2004), she became well-known as a leading actress in films, notably in Sunny (2008), Midnight FM (2010), and The Flu (2013). She also appeared in the popular television dramas Emperor of the Sea (2004), A Thousand Days' Promise (2011), King of Ambition (2013) and Mask (2015).

== Career ==
=== Pre-debut ===
Soo Ae nearly became a member of a K-pop idol group. Fresh out of high school, a record agent approached the young stunner on the street in the trendy Apgujeong area. She spent six months in grueling practice, but in the end had no album to put out. She reminisced in an interview, "I didn't sing well, but the six months I spent with the team was so fun. I was lucky to get into acting."

=== 2002–2008 ===
Soo Ae made her small screen debut in 2002 in a one-act drama on MBC, then went on to star in Love Letter, Merry Go Round, and April Kiss. She rose to fame after starring in 2004 hit historical drama Emperor of the Sea, which was exported to other Asian countries, South America and the Middle East, introducing Soo Ae to a wider international audience.

Soo Ae gained the moniker "queen of tears" for her well received takes in melodramas. But she revamped that image in the 2007 romantic comedy Two Outs in the Ninth Inning opposite Lee Jung-jin, playing a 30 year old foul mouthed disheveled and jaded single woman struggling with life and love. Soo Ae in reality was known for her a husky, neutral voice. She once said, "I've been told many times that my voice would be a detriment to my career'. When I first got started, a lot of viewers posted comments online that they changed the channel because of the way I talk. [...] It was odd because I thought of my husky voice as my biggest asset. So I would tell people, "Keep on listening, you'll get to like it."

After a successful big screen debut in A Family, Soo Ae starred opposite Jung Jae-young in the comedy Wedding Campaign, and Lee Byung-hun in the melodrama Once in a Summer.

In 2008, she was cast as the titular Sunny in a film about an ordinary housewife who becomes a "consolatory band" singer in order to search for her husband who has been dispatched to fight alongside American troops in the Vietnam War. Director Lee Joon-ik sought to tell a war story from a female-centric point of view, saying the film deals with the meaning of love and humanitarian as it depicts a long voyage of self-discovery. In a scene where she drinks heavily at a U.S. army base, Soo Ae revealed that she drank more than half a bottle of whisky at the director's criticism that she didn't look convincing enough. As a result of drinking so much alcohol, she became really drunk, adding reality to the scene where she throws up in the toilet and blacks out. Her commitment to the film paid off, and Soo Ae received multiple Best Actress awards for her performance.

=== 2009–2012 ===
Her 2009 film The Sword with No Name depicted a desperate romance between the last queen of the Joseon Dynasty and her bodyguard. Empress Myeongseong, a forward-thinking advocate of modernity, wields her political influence to further her ideals, but is often at odds with her orthodox father-in-law, regent Daewon-gun. The movie is loosely based on history, with clearly fictional elements. Soo Ae said the role "was something I had always wanted to do from the moment I started my acting career. When I got the screenplay, I said yes without a moment's hesitation. [...] Playing Empress Myeongseong was not easy, because in addition to the mother of the nation, I had to show her womanly and human side, the joy and anguish she felt at being in love." Having to wear heavy wigs and layers of Korean traditional costumes in the steamy hot summer made the job even more difficult. The fact that she had to appear in almost every scene was another challenge. Describing herself as "timid" and "too introverted," Soo Ae credits her co-star Cho Seung-woo for making it easier for her to fully absorb herself in the love aspect of her role, such that it felt "like [they] were actually in a relationship during the shoot."

Frustrated by usually receiving melodrama scripts and wanting to take on roles in different genres, Soo Ae next starred in the 2010 suspense thriller Midnight FM. She said she decided to challenge herself by choosing the role of a strong female character fighting against a villain. She talked about the heightened fear she felt in a confined studio as her radio DJ character receives threatening phone calls from a kidnapper (played by Yoo Ji-tae), as well as the physical difficulty of filming chase and fight scenes in high heels. She tied with Yoon Jeong-hee (Poetry) for Best Actress at the Blue Dragon Film Awards.

In her return to television, Soo Ae played a cold-blooded double agent in Athena: Goddess of War, undergoing martial arts training to perform her intense action scenes in the spy series.

Then in the miniseries A Thousand Days' Promise by famed drama writer Kim Soo-hyun, Soo Ae impressed critics and audiences with her unsentimental portrayal of a woman who is slowly losing her memory due to Alzheimer's disease.

=== 2013–present ===
In 2013, she played an amorally ambitious woman who wants to become the First Lady of South Korea in Yawang ("King of Ambition"), from the same manhwa artist as Daemul. This was followed by disaster outbreak film The Flu, in which she said she played a doctor and single mother who searches for a cure after her daughter is infected. Soo Ae said she is attracted to roles with an oeyunaegang quality, which literally translates to "iron fist in a velvet glove," meaning those who appear gentle but are determined and strong.

In September 2013, Soo Ae left Star J Entertainment, her agency of 12 years, and joined Management Soop. She returned to Star J Entertainment in January 2015. Soo Ae next played dual roles in Mask, about a debt-ridden department store clerk who takes on an heiress's identity and marries into a chaebol family. Her performance won her Best Actress at the 28th Grimae Award, an honorable award chosen by directors in every broadcasting station in Korea. She was then cast as a North Korean defector who becomes part of the first South Korean women's national ice hockey team in Take Off 2, the sequel to the 2009 hit sports drama.

Nine years after her last romantic-comedy drama Two Outs in the Ninth Inning, Soo Ae starred in KBS2's romantic-comedy Sweet Stranger and Me in 2016.

In 2018, Soo Ae starred in the drama film High Society. In May 2019, Soo Ae signed with new agency Huayi Brothers.

In November 2022, Soo Ae signed with Ghost Studio.

In August 2023, Soo Ae signed with new agency Makestar.

In November 2025, Soo Ae signed with new agency Nexus E&M.

== Filmography ==
=== Film ===
Year	Title	Role
2004	A Family	Lee Jeong-eun
2005	Wedding Campaign	Kim Lara
2006	Once in a Summer	Seo Jung-in / Lee Jung-in
2008	Sunny	Soon-yi / Sunny
2009	The Sword with No Name	Min Ja-young, later Empress Myeongseong
2010	Midnight FM	Ko Sun-young
2013	The Flu	Kim In-hae
2016	Take Off 2	Ji-won
2018	High Society	Oh Soo-yeon

=== Television ===
Year	Title	Role
1999	School 2	guest appearance
2002	MBC Best Theater: "One Sided Love"	
2002	The Maengs' Golden Era	Heo Joo-yeon
2003	Love Letter	Jo Eun-ha
2003	Merry Go Round	Seong Jin-kyo
2004	April Kiss	Song Chae-won
2004	Emperor of the Sea	Lady Jung-hwa
2007	Two Outs in the Ninth Inning	Hong Nan-hee
2010	Athena: Goddess of War	Yoon Hye-in
2011	A Thousand Days' Promise	Lee Seo-yeon
2013	King of Ambition	Joo Da-hae
2015	Mask	Byun Ji-sook / Seo Eun-ha
2016	Sweet Stranger and Me	Hong Na-ri
2021	Artificial City	Yoon Jae-hee

== Awards and nominations ==
Year	Award	Category	Nominated work	Result	Ref.
2003	MBC Drama Awards	Best New Actress	Love Letter, Merry Go Round	Won	
2004	KBS Drama Awards	Excellence Award, Actress	April Kiss	Nominated	
2004	25th Blue Dragon Film Awards	Best New Actress	A Family	Won	
2004	3rd Korean Film Awards	Best New Actress	A Family	Won	
2004	3rd CGV Viewer's Choice of the Year Awards	Best New Actress	A Family	Won	
2004	7th Director's Cut Awards	Best New Actress	A Family	Won	
2004	Cine 21 Awards	Best New Actress	A Family	Won	
2005	42nd Grand Bell Awards	Best New Actress	A Family	Nominated	
2005	41st Baeksang Arts Awards	Best New Actress (Film)	A Family	Won	
2005	2nd Max Movie Awards	Best Actress	A Family	Won	
2005	KBS Drama Awards	Excellence Award, Actress	Emperor of the Sea	Won	
2005	KBS Drama Awards	Best Couple Award with Song Il-gook	Emperor of the Sea	Won	
2006	2nd Premiere Rising Star Awards	Best Actress	Wedding Campaign	Nominated	
2007	15th Chunsa Film Art Awards	Best Actress	Once in a Summer	Nominated	
2007	Korea TV Advertising Festival	Best Couple Award with Jang Dong-gun	Maxim CF	Won	
2008	28th Arts Council Korea	Best Artist of the Year in Film	Sunny	Won	
2008	31st Golden Cinematography Awards	Most Popular Actress	Sunny	Won	
2008	29th Blue Dragon Film Awards	Best Leading Actress	Sunny	Nominated	
2008	4th Premiere Rising Star Awards	Best Actress	Sunny	Won	
2008	17th Buil Film Awards	Best Actress	Sunny	Won	
2008	28th Korean Association of Film Critics Awards	Best Actress	Sunny	Won	
2009	46th Grand Bell Awards	Best Actress	Sunny	Won	
2009	17th Korean Culture and Entertainment Awards	Best Actress	Sunny	Won	
2009	45th Baeksang Arts Awards	Best Actress (Film)	Sunny	Nominated	
2010	47th Savings Day	Prime Minister's Commendation	—N/a	Won	
2010	31st Blue Dragon Film Awards	Best Leading Actress	Midnight FM	Won	
2010	6th University Film Festival of Korea	Best Actress	Midnight FM	Won	
2011	8th Max Movie Awards	Best Actress	Midnight FM	Nominated	
2011	47th Baeksang Arts Awards	Best Actress (Film)	Midnight FM	Nominated	
2011	15th Puchon International Fantastic Film Festival	Actor's Award	—N/a	Won	
2011	27th Korea Best Dresser Swan Awards	Best Dressed, Movie Actress Category	—N/a	Won	
2011	SBS Drama Awards	Top Excellence Award, Actress in a Special Planning Drama	A Thousand Days' Promise	Won	
2011	SBS Drama Awards	Excellence Award, Actress in a Special Planning Drama	Athena: Goddess of War	Nominated	
2011	SBS Drama Awards	Top 10 Stars	A Thousand Days' Promise, Athena: Goddess of War	Won	
2012	48th Baeksang Arts Awards	Best Actress (TV)	A Thousand Days' Promise	Nominated	
2012	5th Korea Drama Awards	Top Excellence Award, Actress	A Thousand Days' Promise	Nominated	
2013	2nd APAN Star Awards	Top Excellence Award, Actress	King of Ambition	Nominated	
2013	6th Korea Drama Awards	Excellence Award, Actress	King of Ambition	Nominated	
2013	SBS Drama Awards	Top Excellence Award, Actress in a Drama Special	King of Ambition	Nominated	
2015	4th APAN Star Awards	Top Excellence Award, Actress in a Miniseries	Mask	Nominated	
2015	28th Grimae Awards	Best Actress	Mask	Won	
2016	KBS Drama Awards	Excellence Award, Actress in a Miniseries	Sweet Stranger and Me	Nominated	
2017	1st Korean Screenwriter Association	Best Actress	Take Off 2	Won	
2018	7th Korea Best Star Awards	Best Actress	High Society	Won	
