= The Queen Who Crowns =

2025 South Korean television series

- Promotional poster
- Hangul: 원경
- RR: Wongyeong
- MR: Wŏn'gyŏng
- Genre: Period drama Melodrama
- Written by: Lee Young-mi
- Directed by: Kim Sang-ho
- Starring: Cha Joo-young; Lee Hyun-wook; Lee Yi-dam; Lee Si-a
- Music by: Dong Min-hoo
- Country of origin: South Korea
- Original language: Korean
- No. of episodes: 12

Production
- Running time: 60 minutes
- Production companies: Studio Dragon; JS Pictures

Original release
- Network: TVING; tvN
- Release: January 6 – February 11, 2025

The Queen Who Crowns (Korean: 원경) is a 2025 South Korean television series starring Cha Joo-young in the title role, along with Lee Hyun-wook, Lee Yi-dam and Lee Si-a. It aired on TVING every Monday and Tuesday at 14:00 (KST) and aired on tvN every Monday and Tuesday at 20:50 (KST) from January 6 to February 11, 2025.

== Plot ==
At the end Goryeo dynasty period, Won-gyeong chooses to marry the man she loves. She supports her husband, Lee Bang-won, in his rise to the throne. However, as he consolidates his rule and stabilizes the kingdom, conflicts arise between them. Despite their struggles, Won-gyeong never wavers and fulfills her role as both queen and a devoted wife.

== Cast ==
=== Main ===
- Cha Joo-young as Queen Wongyeong

A woman who dreamed of a new world, she is the daughter of Min-je of Yeoheung Min clan.

- Lee Hyun-wook as Lee Bang-won

Wongyeong's husband and the third king of Joseon.

- Lee E-dam as Chae-ryeong

The queen's servant who became the king's woman.

- Lee Si-a as Yeong-sil

A concubine who is pregnant with the king's child.

=== Supporting ===
People around Wongyeong

- Park Ji-il as Min Je

Wongyeong's father.

- Han Seung-won as Min Mu-jil

Wongyeong's brother.

- Kim Woo-dam as Min Mu-goo

Wongyeong's younger brother.

- Dong Hyo-hee as Mrs. Song

Wongyeong's biological mother.

People around Bang-won

- Lee Sung-min as Lee Seong-gye

Bang-won's father, Queen Won-gyeong's father-in-law, and the founder of the Joseon Dynasty.

Others

- Choi Deok-moon as Ha Ryun

A Joseon bureaucrat.

- So Hee-jung as Court Lady Jeong

A court lady.

- Jeong Ui-sun as Court Lady Seo

Queen's court lady.

- Kim Jeong as Court Lady Kim

Daejeon court lady.

- Song Jae-ryong as a blind fortune-teller
- Hwang Young-hee as Gyo Ha-daek

=== Special appearances ===
- Lee Jun-young as King Sejong (Ep. 12)

Wongyeong and Taejong’s son, the fourth king of Joseon.

== Production ==
=== Development ===
Director Kim Sang-ho, who worked on the dramas Couple or Trouble (2006), Arang and the Magistrate (2012), Avengers Social Club (2017), and Money Game (2020), confirmed to direct the series, and writer Lee Young-mi, who wrote Money Game, wrote the screenplay. It is produced by Studio Dragon and JS Pictures.

=== Casting ===
tvN and TVING announced on October 26, 2023, that they had confirmed the production of the historical drama The Queen Who Crowns and cast Cha Joo-young in the role of Queen Wongyeong and Lee Hyun-wook in the role of Lee Bang-won.

=== Filming ===
The series had finished all its filming in June 2024.

=== Music ===
The OST singer lineup, which includes Sohyang, Yoo Da-bin, Lim Han-byul, and Jukjae, was unveiled by Vlending on December 27, 2024.

== Release ==
Originally, The Queen Who Crowns was scheduled to air on tvN and TVING in the second half of 2024, but it was postponed. On October 7, 2024, it was reported that the series was scheduled to premiere in January 2025, every Monday and Tuesday. The series was confirmed to premiere on January 6, 2025, and was pre-released on TVING at 14:00 (KST), and premiered on tvN at 20:50 (KST). The series also streams on Viki.

== Reception ==
=== Viewership ===
The Queen Who Crowns : South Korea viewers per episode (thousands)

Season	Episode number												Average
Season	1	2	3	4	5	6	7	8	9	10	11	12	Average
1	1130	1262	1117	1324	1092	1173	968	803	1112	1279	1240	1467	1164

Source: Audience measurement performed nationwide by Nielsen Korea.

Average TV viewership ratings
Ep.	Original broadcast date	Average audience share (Nielsen Korea)	
Ep.	Original broadcast date	Nationwide	Seoul
1	January 6, 2025	4.873% (1st)	5.131% (1st)
2	January 7, 2025	5.490% (1st)	5.329% (1st)
3	January 13, 2025	4.919% (1st)	4.648% (1st)
4	January 14, 2025	5.599% (1st)	5.327% (1st)
5	January 20, 2025	5.020% (1st)	4.969% (1st)
6	January 21, 2025	5.218% (1st)	4.999% (1st)
7	January 27, 2025	4.070% (1st)	4.077% (1st)
8	January 28, 2025	3.568% (1st)	3.530% (1st)
9	February 3, 2025	4.883% (1st)	5.057% (1st)
10	February 4, 2025	5.634% (1st)	5.164% (1st)
11	February 10, 2025	5.817% (1st)	5.402% (1st)
12	February 11, 2025	6.625% (1st)	6.416% (1st)
Average		5.143%	5.004%
In the table above, the blue numbers represent the lowest ratings and the red numbers represent the highest ratings.; This drama aired on a cable channel/pay TV which normally has a relatively smaller audience compared to free-to-air TV/public broadcasters (KBS, SBS, MBC, and EBS).

=== Accolades ===
Award ceremony	Year	Category	Nominee	Result	Ref.
Blue Dragon Series Awards	2025	Best Actress	Cha Joo-young	Nominated	
Blue Dragon Series Awards	2025	Best New Actress	Lee Yi-dam	Nominated	
APAN Star Awards	2025	Top Excellence Award, Actress in a Miniseries	Cha Joo-young	Won	

== Prequel ==
A two-part prequel was released on January 21, 2025, at 12:00 (KST) on TVING.
