= Korean comedy =

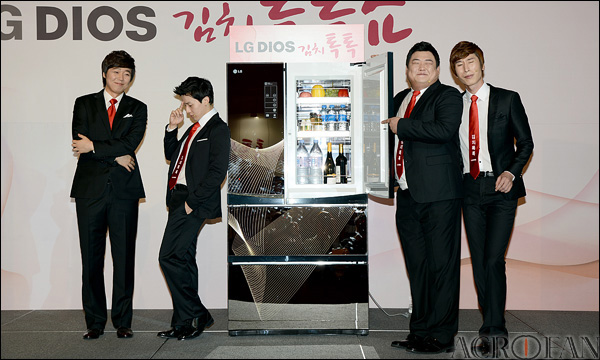
Korean comedy show "Gag Concert"

Korean comedy is the art of comedy, either enacted on stage, or within other media forms in the Korean language. It is not limited by country, so long as the actor has Korean roots.

== Comedy in Japanese occupied Korea ==
The first modern form of comedy plays in Korea started in 1913 by the Hyoksin troupe, which gave performances along with shinpa dramas.

== Comedy in South Korea ==
TV comedy in South Korea can traced back to 1969 with the comedy show Blessings Come Your Way When You Smile, which aired on MBC. The show was based on the performances of musical play troupes known as akgeukdan (악극단). Blessings... grew popular as TVs became easier to purchase in the 1970s, and it was estimated to have recorded viewer ratings around 70% in its heyday. At the time, comedians were regarded lowly within Korean society; comedian Gu Bong-seo recalled in 1999 how "if a doctor appeared in a comedy, the medical association would protest, and if a pottery piece was broken, antique dealers would object." In 1977, it was decided that all comedy shows would be canceled, as they were deemed low quality; within a day of the announcement, however, it was decided that weekly shows would remain on the air.

The first "gag" (개그, equivalent to slapstick comedies) comedy was the show Smile a Little (살짜기 웃어예) aired on TBC in 1974. The show reflected the comedy trends that were popular in South Korean universities. In the 1980s, there were debates among comedians who base their comedy in comedy plays and the aforementioned "gag" comedians, with gag comedians often being derided as lacking creativity and "stuff that would be more fitting for a school talent show". However, after the 1980s, comedy styles birthed by the gag comedians became the mainstream style of comedy, in the form of comedy skits in shows such as Gag Concert and Comedy Big League. Political cartoons depicting satirical depictions of current events are also common in newspapers, though due to economic issues and the rise of webtoons, political cartoons have seen a decline.

== Comedy in North Korea ==
=== Jaedam ===
Jaedam (similar to traditional Korean comedy Mandam) is a comedy genre that is similar to standup comedy, wordplay or puns.

=== Chongeuk ===
Chongeuk is North Korean sketch comedy.

=== Gyoye ===
North Korean circuses similar to slapstick comedies.

=== Manp'il ===
Man p'il is a satirical essay that was improved in North Korea in 1961 by O Hong-taek. In 1978, after the publishing of the manp'il "What has been really grown so highly? (무엇이고도성장되였는가?)" by O Hong-taek, Kim Jong Il instructed the creative directions of the essay, airtimes, types and content. In late May 2005, the Pyongyang Broadcasting Corporation revived comic folk tales for political commentary, in an attempt to satirize American society, and political jockeying for power by using the form known as manp'il, or "comic notes" in a short acted dialogue using folkish humour and animal metaphors.

=== Political censorship ===
Satirizing North Korean leaders is banned. Dr. Dima Mironenko studied how the first romantic comedy film in North Korea has no records remaining due to people being involved in the production being purged.

=== Recent examples ===
In 2013, North Korea aired a comedy show that imitated Barack Obama and South Korean figures.

== Famous Korean comedians ==
- Jang Dong-min
- Jang Do-yeon
- Lee Yi-kyung
- Jee Seok-jin
- Jeong Hyeong-don
- Jeong Jun-ha
- Jo Se-ho
- Kang Ho-dong
- Lee Guk-joo
- Kim Gu-ra
- Kim Jun-ho
- Kim Jun-hyun
- Kim Young-chul
- Lee Kyung-gyu
- Lee Su-geun
- Lee Hyuk-jae
- Lee Hwi-jae
- Park Myung-soo
- Park Na-rae
- Park Soo-hong
- Shin Bong-sun
- Shin Dong-yup
- Yang Sang-guk
- Yang Se-chan
- Yang Se-hyung
- Yoo Jae-suk
- Yoo Sang-moo
- Kim Byung-man
- Kim Shin-young

== See also ==
- It's So Funny
- Korean art
- Korean culture
- Contemporary culture of South Korea
- Infinite Challenge
- Running Man (South Korean TV series)
