= Kim Mi-sook =

South Korean actress (born 1959)

- Born: March 26, 1959 (age 67); Seodaemun-gu, Seoul, South Korea
- Other name: Kim Mi-suk
- Education: Korea National Open University - Early Childhood Education (dropped out); Kyungwoon University - Business Administration; Dongshin University Graduate School - Master's degree in Cultural Industry
- Occupation: Actress
- Years active: 1979–present
- Spouse: Choi Jeong-sik

Korean name
- Hangul: 김미숙
- Hanja: 金美淑
- RR: Gim Misuk
- MR: Kim Misuk

Kim Mi-sook (Korean: 김미숙, born March 26, 1959) is a South Korean actress.

== Career ==
Kim Mi-sook made her acting debut in 1979 and has since had a prolific career on television. Her notable roles in the 2000s include a divorcee making a new start in morning drama Queen's Conditions (2005), and the villainous stepmother in primetime hit Brilliant Legacy (2009). For her much-praised portrayal of the mother of an autistic runner in Marathon (2005), Kim received Best Supporting Actress nominations from the Grand Bell Awards and Korean Film Awards. She was again nominated at the Grand Bell Awards, Blue Dragon Film Awards and Korean Film Awards for her supporting turn in action thriller Seven Days (2007).

== Other activities ==
Kim established 사랑유치원 ("Love Kindergarten") in 1987 and served as its director until 2002. She also co-founded an artist group called "Hyangmihoe", along with Lee Su-chang, Kwon Young-Ho, Yu Si-Won, Park Gi-Tae, Lee Sang-Gil, and others.

== Stalker ==
A woman who had been stalking Kim for 17 years was arrested in 2007.

== Filmography ==
=== Film ===
- Seven Days (2007)
- Marathon (2005)
- A Hilarious Mourning (O-gu) (2003)
- I Want to Go (1984)
- Milky Way in Blue Sky (1984)
- Born on February 30 (1983)
- Another's Nest (1982)
- Ardent Love (1982)
- Three Women Under the Umbrella (1980)

=== Television drama ===
- The Whirlwind (Netflix, 2024)
- Payback: Money and Power (2023) - Cameo
- Little Women (2022)
- Artificial City (2021)
- Beautiful Love, Wonderful Life (2019)
- Man in the Kitchen (2017)
- Sweet Stranger and Me (2016)
- Flowers of the Prison (2016)
- All About My Mom (2015)
- Flower of Queen (2015)
- Glorious Day (2014)
- Empire of Gold (2013)
- Case Number 113 (2013)
- Hur Jun, The Original Story (2013)
- Insu, the Queen Mother (jTBC, 2011)
- Just Like Today (MBC, 2011)
- City Hunter (SBS, 2011)
- My Love By My Side (SBS, 2011)
- Happiness in the Wind (KBS1, 2010)
- Definitely Neighbors (SBS, 2010)
- Brilliant Legacy (SBS, 2009)
- Don't Cry My Love (MBC, 2008)
- Lobbyist (SBS, 2007)
- Golden Bride (SBS, 2007)
- I'll Go With You (SBS, 2006)
- As the River Flows (KBS1, 2006)
- Queen's Conditions (SBS, 2005)
- Toji, the Land (SBS, 2004)
- Love Is All Around (MBC, 2004)
- Island Village Teacher (SBS, 2004)
- Punch (SBS, 2003)
- Sweetheart (SBS, 2003)
- Outing (SBS, 2001)
- Well Known Woman (SBS, 2001)
- Blue Mist (KBS2, 2001)
- Sad Temptation (KBS2, 1999)
- Hug (SBS, 1998)
- I Love You! I Love You! (SBS, 1998)
- Three Kim Generation (SBS, 1998)
- Love (MBC, 1998)
- MBC Best Theater "7 Days of Choice" (MBC, 1997)
- 70-minute Dramas "Two Mothers" (SBS, 1997)
- Mountain (MBC,1997)
- Power of Love (MBC, 1996)
- Children in the Wide Sea (SBS, 1996)
- Until We Can Love (KBS2, 1996)
- Confession (SBS, 1995)
- Korea Gate (SBS, 1995)
- The Third Republic (MBC, 1993)
- Thirty-one Year Old Rebellion (KBS2, 1993)
- Country Diary (MBC,1993)
- To the Lovely Others (SBS, 1993)
- Warm River (MBC, 1993)
- Wind in the Grass (MBC, 1992)
- Women's Time (KBS2, 1991)
- Earth (MBC,1991)
- Autumn Guests (KBS2, 1990)
- Dark Sky, Dark Bird (MBC, 1990)
- Under the Wool (KBS2, 1989)
- The Second Republic (MBC, 1989)
- Fetters of Love (KBS2, 1989)
- Others (KBS2, 1987)
- Gayo Drama (KBS2, 1987)
- Warm River (KBS2, 1986)
- Your Portrait (KBS2, 1986)
- Far and Distant People (KBS2, 1986)
- Finding Happiness - Episode 2 "Cheer Up, Dad" (KBS2, 1986)
- TV Literature "The Jehol Diary" (KBS2, 1985)
- TV Literature "The Last Song" (KBS2, 1985)
- Silver Rapids (KBS1, 1985)
- I Like My Daughter Better (KBS2, 1984)
- Nursing Ward (KBS2, 1984)
- Maze (KBS2, 1984)
- High School Birthday Diary (KBS1,1983)
- A Youth March (KBS1, 1983)
- A Water-bearer From Bukcheong (KBS1, 1982)
- Rumble (1982)
- The Land of Promises (1982)
- Pray for Blessings on Us (1981)
- TV Literature Museum - Mujin Travel (1981)
- Forget-Me-Not (1981)
- Rainbow (1981)
- Concentric Grass (1980)
- Hometown of Legends "Sangsacho" (1980)
- Hometown of Legends "Dead Woman" (1979)
- Hometown of Legends "Hongsalmun" (1979)
- Chassi Village (1979)

=== Documentary ===
- MBC Special - Naturalist Tasha's Garden (MBC, 2008) - narration

== Radio program ==
- Kim Mi-sook's Family Music (KBS 1FM, 2018- )
- All the Music in the World with Kim Mi-sook (KBS 1FM, 2002–2007)
- This Beautiful Morning with Kim Mi-sook (SBS Power FM, 1996–2000)
- Kim Mi-sook's Music Salon (MBC Standard FM, 1990)

== Spoken word album ==
- Happy Stories 행복을 숨겨둔 곳 Disc 1 (2002)
- Kim Mi-sook's Poetry Readings at Home (1994)
- Kim Mi-sook Telling the Fairy Tales of Our Times (1994, parts 1 and 2)
- 눈물이 시가되어 흐를때 (1990)

== Awards and nominations ==
Year	Award	Category	Nominated work	Result
1985	KBS 연기대상 방송연기상	Grand Prize (Daesang)		Won
1989	Dong-A Theatre Awards	Best Actress	Autumn Sonata	Won
1991	KBS Drama Awards	Top Excellence Award, Actress	Women's Time	Won
2001	SBS Drama Awards	Excellence Award, Actress	Outing	Won
2005	Grand Bell Awards	Best Actress	Marathon	Nominated
2005	Korean Film Awards	Best Actress	Marathon	Nominated
2005	Chunsa Film Art Awards	Best Actress	Marathon	Nominated
2005	SBS Drama Awards	Top Excellence Award, Actress	Queen's Conditions	Won
2006	KBS Right Language Awards	Recipient, Radio host category	All the Music in the World	Won
2007	SBS Drama Awards	Best Supporting Actress in a Miniseries	Lobbyist	Won
2008	Blue Dragon Film Awards	Best Supporting Actress	Seven Days	Nominated
2008	Korean Film Awards	Best Supporting Actress	Seven Days	Nominated
2009	SBS Drama Awards	Excellence Award, Actress in a Special Planning Drama	Brilliant Legacy	Nominated
2009	SBS Drama Awards	Top Excellence Award, Actress	Brilliant Legacy	Won
2010	SBS Drama Awards	Best Supporting Actress in a Weekend/Daily Drama	Definitely Neighbors	Nominated
2011	SBS Drama Awards	Special Acting Award, Actress in a Weekend/Daily Drama	My Love By My Side	Nominated
2013	SBS Drama Awards	Special Acting Award, Actress in a Drama Short	Case Number 113	Won
2013	SBS Drama Awards	Special Acting Award, Actress in a Drama Special	Empire of Gold	Nominated
2014	SBS Drama Awards	Special Acting Award, Actress in a Serial Drama	Glorious Day	Nominated

=== State honors ===
Name of country, year given, and name of honor
Country	Year	Honor	Ref.
South Korea (Note: Honors are given at the Korean Popular Culture and Arts Awards, arranged by the Korea Creative Content Agency and hosted by the Ministry of Culture, Sports and Tourism. They are awarded to those who have contributed to the arts and South Korea's pop culture.)	2010	Minister of Culture, Sports and Tourism Commendation	
