= Sweet Stranger and Me =

2016 South Korean television series

- Genre: Family; Comedy; Romance
- Based on: The Man Living in Our House by Yoo Hyun-sook
- Written by: Kim Eun-jung
- Directed by: Kim Jung-min
- Starring: Soo Ae; Kim Young-kwang; Lee Soo-hyuk; Jo Bo-ah; Kim Ji-hoon
- Opening theme: "Fool" by Kim Jong-kook "Going Through Your Heart" by Henry feat. Mark
- Country of origin: South Korea
- Original language: Korean
- No. of episodes: 16

Production
- Executive producer: Lee Kun-jun
- Cinematography: Kim Kyung-hoo
- Running time: 60 mins
- Production company: Content K

Original release
- Network: KBS2
- Release: October 24 – December 13, 2016

Sweet Stranger and Me (Korean: 우리집에 사는 남자; RR: Urijibe saneun namja; lit. 'The Man Living in Our House') is a 2016 South Korean television series based on the 2015 webtoon of the same name by Yoo Hyun-sook. It was aired every Mondays and Tuesdays at 22:00 (KST) on KBS2.

== Synopsis ==
Flight attendant Hong Na-ri aimlessly returns to her childhood home, Seulgi. Ten months earlier, her mother, Shin Jung-im, died in a car accident, while her nine-year relationship with her fiancé, Jo Dong-jin, ended abruptly when she saw him cheating with Do Yeo-joo, a fellow flight attendant infamous for being a homewrecker. She is surprised to see Jung-im's second husband, Go Nan-gil, who is three years Na-ri's junior, waiting for her at home. Na-ri is initially hostile to Nan-gil, suspecting that he is a conman who married her mother so he could inherit ownership of her lakeside property. As she lives with him, she learns that Nan-gil indeed married Jung-im to inherit her property, but not for his own benefit. He made a promise to Jung-im that he would protect the land from being sold to Green Land, a chaebol who wants to convert it into a resort. The CEO of Greenland's robot division, Kwon Deuk-bong, pesters Nan-gil's mandu restaurant everyday to sell the land.

Na-ri slowly warms up to and eventually falls in love with Nan-gil. She realizes that Nan-gil is not a stranger to her. He grew up in an orphanage where Jung-im volunteered at and had been watching Na-ri since childhood; in fact, she was and remains his only crush. Nan-gil was adopted by Bae Byung-woo, the ruthless chairman of Dada Finance, a loan shark company, and trained to become a cold criminal. He quit the company after driving a man to commit suicide. To his horror, he learns that the man was Hong Sung-kyu, Na-ri's biological father. In the meantime, Dong-jin grows guilty of cheating on Na-ri, whom he still loves. A heartbroken Yeo-joo decides to break up with him.

Deuk-bong teams up with Na-ri and Nan-gil to uncover the secrets regarding Dada and Green Land. He falls in love with Na-ri and tries to win her affection. Wanting to atone for what she has done, Yeo-joo tries to help him, only to end up falling in love with him instead. Deuk-bong learns that two generations ago, Green Land owned the Hong family's land and had used it as a chemical waste disposal center. The orphanage that once stood in Na-ri's childhood home was destroyed by chemical fire, killing everyone except for Green Land's secretary, Ms. Kwon. Jung-im was protecting the land to prevent Green Land from whitewashing their crimes. In response, Green Land and Dada have been working together to discredit her family; they set up Sung-kyu and Jung-im's brother, Jeong-nam, into a debt that forced them to go on the run.

Byung-woo's assistant and adopted son, Kim Wan-shik, eventually betrays him by helping Nan-gil get a document exposing Dada's crimes. Meanwhile, Na-ri unexpectedly reunites with Sung-kyu, who faked his death and is living in hiding. He decides to surrender to the police, though he is allowed to leave on bail. To stop his father, Green Land's chairman, from messing up Na-ri's family further, Deuk-bong exposes Green Land's dealings to the police, preventing his father from continuing his plans but slandering Green Land's reputation. Now that Sung-kyu is around, Nan-gil files an annulment of his marriage with Jung-im, therefore allowing him to legally pursue a relationship with Na-ri.

A year later, Nan-gil proposes to Na-ri at their elementary school, the place where they first met.

== Cast ==
=== Main ===
- Soo Ae as Hong Na-ri

A headstrong but meticulous flight attendant for Asiana Airlines who trusts her intuition too much and has trouble managing her emotions. She is left out in the cold when her boyfriend of nine years, Jo Dong-jin, whom she planned to marry cheats on her with her colleague, Do Yeo-joo. At first, Na-ri distrusts her stepfather Go Nan-gil and regards him as a con artist. However she later shows respect and starts to develop intimate relationship with him. She is still looking for the whereabouts of Hong Sung-kyu, her biological father.

- Kim Young-kwang as Go Nan-gil

The owner of Hong Dumplings. He had a rough past as a legendary gangster and debt collector in the bond industry. He has seen a lot for a man in his mid-20s, but behind the mix of light and dark, as well as warmth and coldness, he is a young man with a soft heart and has a desire to protect his family. He made a promise to his late wife, Shin Jung-im, to maintain the ownership of their dumpling shop and houses at all cost. Nan-gil later develop intimate relationship with his stepdaughter, Hong Na-ri.

- Lee Soo-hyuk as Kwon Deuk-bong

A genius and ambitious company director born with a golden spoon in his mouth. With a problematic family and inheritance issues to deal with, he can be cruel and moody but hides his dark nature with a cool facade. He has a law degree but ceases to practice it, instead he runs a robot museum in Seulgi, which gives him nickname "Robot" by the local people. He has been tasked by his father, chairman of the Green Land, to take the ownership of lands around Hong Dumplings and turn it into a holiday resort. Deuk-bong also has a crush on Na-ri.

- Jo Bo-ah as Do Yeo-joo

A lively flight attendant, who is the eldest in her family. She uses her looks as a weapon and has lied and stolen her way to hiding her poverty ever since she was young. She is more comfortable befriending men who, unlike women, easily fall for her lies. Yeo-joo is disliked by her colleagues due to her bad behaviors. She is burdened by the medical condition of her father which motivates her into having a relationship with a rich guy, so she can support her family. She is currently in a relationship with Jo Dong-jin, Hong Na-ri's former boyfriend.

- Kim Ji-hoon as Jo Dong-jin

Na-ri's insecure boyfriend, who cheats on her with Yeo-joo. Although he is currently in a relationship with Yeo-Joo, he is still unsure with his decision to leave Hong Na-ri.

=== Supporting ===
==== Na-ri's family ====
- Kim Mi-sook as Shin Jung-im (Na-ri's mother & Nan-gil's wife)

The original owner of Hong Dumplings. Her scenes are only shown in flashbacks. She maintains and runs the dumpling shop albeit a large amount of debts left by her first husband, Hong Sung-kyu. Jung-im often visited Go Nan-gil in the orphanage during his childhood. Both later married (without Na-ri's knowledge) and lived together until she was killed in a mysterious accident.

- Kim Ha-kyun as Shin Jeong-nam (Na-ri's uncle)

A man who is living under the threat of violence from Dada Finance, due to his inability to pay the debts he owes to them. His relationship with Na-ri isn't that close; they rarely communicate since Na-ri works as a flight attendant.

- Noh Yeong-guk as Hong Sung-kyu (Na-ri's father & Jung-im first husband)

A man who owns a large sum of debt to Dada Finance. Currently, his whereabouts are unknown.

==== Hong Dumplings ====
- Ji Yoon-ho as Lee Yong-gyoo
- Lee Kang-min as Park Joon
- Jung Ji-hwan as Kang Han-yi

==== Green Land ====
- Shin Se-hwi as Kwon Duk-shim (Duk-bong's half sister)

A young girl who is having a bad relationship with her parents and decides to live with her estranged brother in Seulgi. Duk-shim is anti-social, prefers to be solitary than hanging out with her school friends, who occasionally bullies her. She has a crush on Nan-gil, due to the past actions taken by Nan-gil to save her. She starts to work in Hong Dumplings to attract Nan-gil's attention. Duk-shim hates Na-ri and regards her as an obstacle between her and Nan-gil.

- Choi Jong-won as Chairman Kwon (Duk-bong's father)

The chairman of Green Land. He has a plan to own and transform lands around Hong Dumplings into a holiday resort.

- Lee Kyung-shim as Hwa-yeon (Duk-shim's mother)
- Jung Kyung-soon as Kwon Soon-rye

==== Dada Finance ====
- Park Sang-myun as Bae Byung-woo (Chairman of Dada Finance)

The main antagonist of the series. He is known for his notoriety of using illegal means to give loans and extort repayments from his debtors. He does not hesitate to use violence or blackmail to fulfill his goals. Go Nan-gil used to work for him. He has a plan to seize Hong Dumplings as collateral due to the inability of Hong Sung-kyu to pay a large sum of debt to Dada Finance.

- Woo Do-hwan as Kim Wan-shik

Byung-woo's subordinate

==== Flight Attendants ====
- Wang Bit-na as Yoo Shi-eun (Na-ri's senior)
- Kim Jae-in as Jang Yeon-mi (Na-ri's junior)
- Yoo An-na as Park Seon-kyung (Na-ri's junior)

==== Others ====
- Jun Se-hyun as Kim Ran-sook (ex air-hostess)
- Nam Jeong-Hee as Owner of Seulgi store
- Park No-sik

=== Guest appearances ===
- Jang Do-yeon as Jung-hyun's fiancée (Passenger) (Ep. 1 & 8)
- In Gyo-jin as ER Doctor (Ep. 1–2)
- Hong Seok-cheon as Yong-chul (Health trainer) (Ep. 2 & 5)
- Kim Young-ok as Grandma Oh-rye (Ep. 7)
- Lee Mi-do as Lee Mi-sun, writer of Variety show "Top Three Eating King" (Ep. 9–10)
- Lee Ah-ri as Assistant writer of Variety show "Top Three Eating King" (Ep. 9–10)
- Seo Woo-jin as (Cameo)

== Production ==
The first script reading took place on September 12, 2016, at KBS Broadcasting Station in Yeouido, Seoul, South Korea.

Yoo Seung-ho was first offered the male lead role, but declined.

== Original soundtrack ==
=== Part 1 ===
No.	Title	Lyrics	Music	Artist	Length
1.	"Fool (바보야)"	Kim Yeong-ah	Yoon Il-sang	Kim Jong-kook	3:21
2.	"Fool (바보야)" (Inst.)		Yoon Il-sang		3:21
Total length:					6:42

=== Part 2 ===
No.	Title	Lyrics	Music	Artists	Length
1.	"What To Do (니 맘에 들어갈래)"	Henry, SAY, Yoyo	Henry, Gen Neo, Mage	Henry feat. Mark (NCT)	3:16
2.	"What To Do (니 맘에 들어갈래)" (Inst.)		Henry, Genneo, Mage		3:16
Total length:					6:32

=== Part 3 ===
No.	Title	Lyrics	Music	Artists	Length
1.	"Want (원해)"	Cho PD	Yoon Il-sang	Cho PD, JeA (Brown Eyed Girls)	4:20
2.	"Want (원해)" (Inst.)		Yoon Il-sang		4:20
Total length:					8:40

=== Part 4 ===
No.	Title	Lyrics	Music	Artists	Length
1.	"I Will Love You Piece By Piece (소소하게 조금씩)"	Choi Jae-woo	Idiot Park, Peter Pan, Crazy Girl	Junggigo, Dawon (Cosmic Girls)	3:29
2.	"Still Love (그래도 사랑)"	Yoon Min-soo, Choi Seong-il	Yoon Min-soo, KingMing	Im Se-jun	4:29
3.	"I Will Love You Piece By Piece (소소하게 조금씩)" (Inst.)		Idiot Park, Peter Pan, Crazy Girl		3:29
4.	"Still Love (그래도 사랑)" (Inst.)		Yoon Min-soo, KingMing		4:29
Total length:					15:56

=== Part 5 ===
No.	Title	Artist	Length
1.	"You and I (너랑 나랑)"	Solji (EXID)	5:11
2.	"You and I (너랑 나랑)" (Inst.)		5:11
Total length:			10:22

=== Part 6 ===
No.	Title	Artist	Length
1.	"Still Love (그래도 사랑)" (Acoustic ver.)	Im Se-jun	4:28
2.	"Still Love (그래도 사랑)" (Acoustic ver., Inst.)		4:28
Total length:			8:56

=== OST Part 7 ===
No.	Title	Artist	Length
1.	"When The First Snow Falls ('Miss You Much' 2nd Story)"	The Ade	3:44
2.	"When The First Snow Falls ('Miss You Much' 2nd Story)" (Inst.)		3:44
Total length:			7:38

=== Charted songs ===
Chart Performance

Title	Year	Peak chart positions	Sales	Remarks
Title	Year	KOR Gaon	Sales	Remarks
"Fool" (Kim Jong-kook)	2016	89	KOR: 18,861+	Part 1

== Ratings ==
- In this table, the blue numbers represent the lowest ratings and the red numbers represent the highest ratings.
- NR denotes that the drama did not rank in the top 20 daily programs on that date.
- N/A denotes that the rating is not known.

Ep.	Original broadcast date	Average audience share			
Ep.	Original broadcast date	TNmS		AGB Nielsen	
Ep.	Original broadcast date	Nationwide	Seoul	Nationwide	Seoul
1	October 24, 2016	8.2% (16th)	9.5% (10th)	9.0% (11th)	9.1% (12th)
2	October 25, 2016	9.9% (11th)	11.2% (5th)	10.6% (6th)	10.7% (6th)
3	October 31, 2016	6.6% (NR)	8.2% (15th)	7.4% (18th)	8.0% (14th)
4	November 1, 2016	7.0% (18th)	7.3% (14th)	8.5% (10th)	9.0% (8th)
5	November 7, 2016	5.9% (NR)	6.7% (20th)	7.5% (NR)	7.7% (17th)
6	November 8, 2016	4.6% (NR)	5.4% (NR)	6.4% (NR)	6.9% (17th)
7	November 14, 2016	4.2% (NR)	4.4% (NR)	4.5% (NR)	4.9% (NR)
8	November 15, 2016	4.6% (NR)	4.9% (NR)	4.7% (NR)	4.6% (NR)
9	November 21, 2016	5.1% (NR)	—	3.7% (NR)	—
10	November 22, 2016	4.4% (NR)	—	3.9% (NR)	—
11	November 28, 2016	3.4% (NR)	—	4.3% (NR)	—
12	November 29, 2016	3.2% (NR)	—	3.5% (NR)	—
13	December 5, 2016	3.5% (NR)	—	4.1% (NR)	—
14	December 6, 2016	3.3% (NR)	—	3.4% (NR)	—
15	December 12, 2016	2.9% (NR)	—	3.5% (NR)	—
16	December 13, 2016	3.2% (NR)	—	4.0% (NR)	—
Average		5.0%	— (Note: Due to some ratings not recorded, the exact average rating is unknown.)	5.6%	—

== Awards and nominations ==
Year	Award	Category	Recipient	Result
2016	30th KBS Drama Awards	Excellence Award, Actor in a Miniseries	Kim Young-kwang	Nominated
2016	30th KBS Drama Awards	Excellence Award, Actress in a Miniseries	Soo Ae	Nominated
2016	30th KBS Drama Awards	Excellence Award, Actress in a Miniseries	Jo Bo-ah	Nominated

== International broadcast ==
- Vietnam: HTV2 under the name Bố dượng tuổi 30 (from February 28, 2017).
