= Lee Jung-jin =

South Korean actor

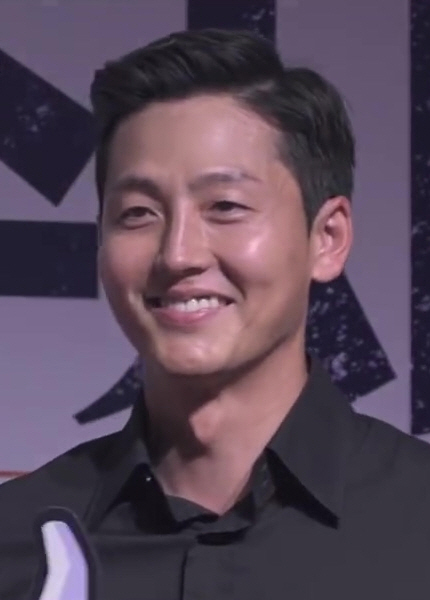
- Lee in June 2016
- Born: May 25, 1978 (age 48); Nowon-gu, Seoul, South Korea
- Education: Hanyang University - Theater and Film
- Occupation: Actor
- Agent: Billions

Korean name
- Hangul: 이정진
- RR: I Jeongjin
- MR: I Chŏngjin

Lee Jung-jin (born May 25, 1978) is a South Korean actor.

== Early life ==
Lee Jung-jin graduated from Konkuk University with a degree in horticulture before studying acting at Hanyang University.

== Career ==
Lee worked as a model before being discovered by Jeong Young-beom, the CEO of talent agency Star J Entertainment. He made his acting debut in the 1998 sitcom Soonpoong Clinic, and has since appeared in many television dramas, including Two Outs in the Ninth Inning, Love Story in Harvard, The Fugitive: Plan B, and A Hundred Year Legacy.

He also starred in the films Once Upon a Time in High School, Mapado, Troubleshooter, Eun-ha, and most notably Pietà, for which he received the prestigious Okgwan Order of Cultural Merit.

From 2009 to 2011, Lee was a cast member of the popular variety show segment Qualifications of Men on KBS2's Happy Sunday.

In 2020, Lee Jung-jin played a character of Lee Lim, the illegitimate brother of King Lee Ho and half-uncle of Lee Gon (Lee Min-ho) in SBS TV multi-starrer The King: Eternal Monarch.

== Personal life ==
Lee began his mandatory military service on February 28, 2005, where he worked as a member of the public staff at the Gwangjin District office.

Lee is an ambassador for South Korean international humanitarian and development organization, Good Neighbors.

In January 2018, Lee's agency confirmed he had been dating former member of Nine Muses' Euaerin since June 2017. The couple split in 2019.

== Filmography ==
=== Film ===
Year	English Title	Korean Title	Role	Notes
2000	Bloody Beach	해변으로 가다	Sang-tae	
2002	Bet On My Disco	해적, 디스코 왕 되다	Hae-jeok	
2004	Once Upon a Time in High School	말죽거리 잔혹사	Woo-sik	
2005	Seoul Raiders	韓城攻略	Jeon	Hong Kong film
2005	Mapado	마파도	Uhm Jae-chul	
2010	Troubleshooter	해결사	Jang Pil-ho	
2010	No Doubt	돌이킬 수 없는	Yoo Se-jin	
2012	Wonderful Radio	원더풀 라디오	Lee Jae-hyeok	
2012	Pietà	피에타	Lee Kang-do	
2015	Eun-ha	은하	Seo-jun	
2016	Duel: Final Round	대결	Choi Kang-ho	

=== Television series ===
Year	English Title	Korean Title	Role	Notes	Ref.
1998	Soonpoong Clinic	순풍 산부인과			
1999	Ad Madness	광끼			
2000	She's the One	나는 그녀가 좋다	Choi Seung-man		
2000	More Than Words Can Say	좋은걸 어떡해	Kang Min-soo		
2000	She's More Beautiful Than a Flower	꽃보다 아름다운 그녀			
2001	Lovers	연인들			
2002	Bad Girls	나쁜 여자들	Lee In-ku		
2002	Trio	삼총사	Lee Jae-moon		
2003	Escape from Unemployment	백수 탈출	Wang Woo-ram		
2004	Doctor K	닥터 K			
2004	April Kiss	4월의 키스	Han Jung-woo		
2005	Love Story in Harvard	러브 스토리 인 하버드	Hong Jung-min		
2007	9 End 2 Outs	9회말 2아웃	Byun Hyung-tae		
2008	Don't Cry My Love	사랑해, 울지마	Han Young-min		
2010	The Fugitive: Plan B	도망자 플랜 B	Detective Do Soo		
2013	A Hundred Year Legacy	백년의 유산	Lee Se-yoon		
2013	Basketball	빠스껫 볼	gambling basketball star	Cameo	
2014	Temptation	유혹	Kang Min-woo		
2016	My Horrible Boss	욱씨남정기	Jang Si-hwan		
2016	The K2	더 케이투	Choi Sung-won		
2017	The Liar and His Lover	그녀는 거짓말을 너무 사랑해	Choi Jin-hyuk		
2020	The King: Eternal Monarch	더 킹: 영원의 군주	Lee Lim		
2023	Queen of Masks	가면의 여왕	Song Je-hyeok		

=== Variety show ===
Year	English Title	Korean Title	Role	Ref.
1998	Love for Three Days	3일 간의 사랑		
2009–2011	Qualifications of Men	남자의 자격		
2012		꿈꾸는 광고제작소		
2013	Our Neighborhood Arts and Physical Education	우리동네 예체능		
2015	Law of the Jungle in Yap Islands	정글의 법칙		
2017-2018	Rural Police (Seasons 2–3)	시골경찰		
2021	Star Golf Big League	스타골프빅리그	Cast Member	
2022	Golf Battle: Birdie Buddies 4	편먹고 공치리4	Contestant	

== Awards and nominations ==
Year	Award	Category	Nominated work	Result	Ref.
2008	Seoul Social Work Conference	후원자 부문 서울특별시장상	—N/a	Won	
2012	7th Asia Model Awards	Model Star Award	—N/a	Won	
2012	Korea Film Actor's Association	Achievement Award	Pieta	Won	
2012	Ministry of Culture, Sports and Tourism	Okgwan Order of Cultural Merit	Pieta	Won	
2013	6th Korea Drama Awards	Top Excellence Award, Actor	A Hundred Year Legacy	Won	
2013	MBC Drama Awards	Top Excellence Award, Actor in a Serial Drama	A Hundred Year Legacy	Won	
2014	SBS Drama Awards	Excellence Award, Actor in a Drama Special	Temptation	Nominated	
2020	SBS Drama Awards	Excellence Award, Actor in a Miniseries Fantasy/Romance Drama	The King: Eternal Monarch	Nominated	
