= Cha Joo-young =

South Korean actress (born 1990)

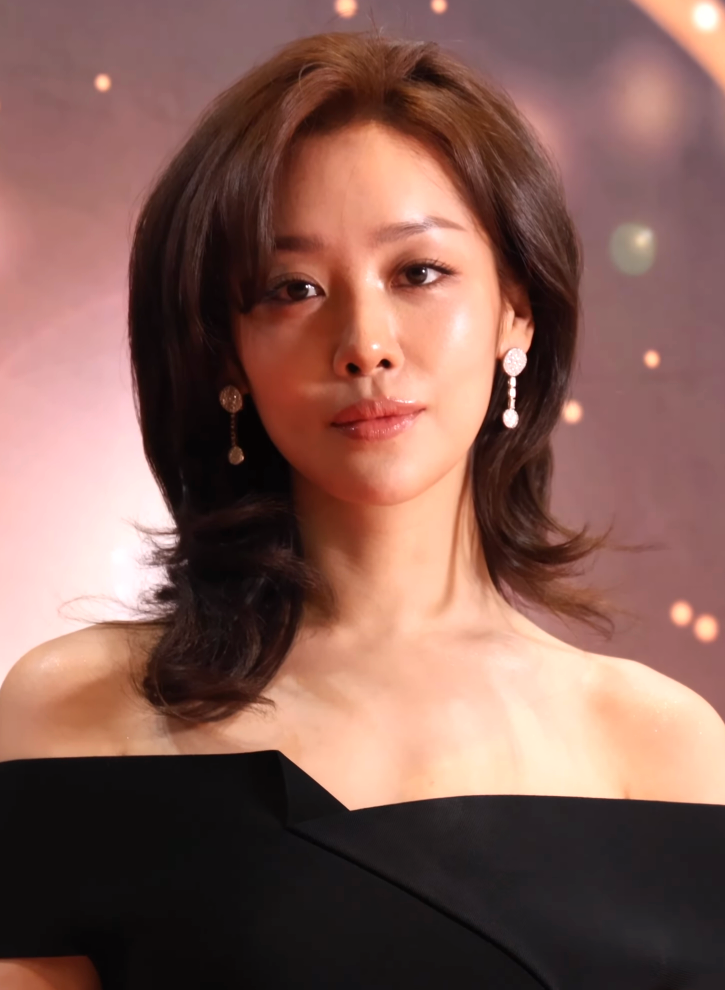
- Cha in December 2025
- Born: June 5, 1990 (age 36); South Korea
- Education: Utah State University (Business Administration)
- Occupation: Actress
- Years active: 2014–present
- Agent: Ghost Studio

Korean name
- Hangul: 차주영
- RR: Cha Juyeong
- MR: Ch'a Chuyŏng

Cha Joo-young (Korean: 차주영; born June 5, 1990) is a South Korean actress. She is known for her roles in dramas such as Cheese in the Trap (2016), Jugglers (2017–2018), Wok of Love (2018), The Spies Who Loved Me (2020), The Glory (2022–2023), and The Real Has Come! (2023).

== Filmography ==
=== Film ===
Year	Title	Role	Ref.
2025	Lobby	Da-mi	
2025	Sister	Sojin	
TBA	Land	Chun-ja	

=== Television series ===
Year	Title	Role	Notes	Ref.
2014	Dr. Frost	Lee Ji-hye		
2015	My Unfortunate Boyfriend	Cha Ju-young		
2015	Cheese in the Trap	Nam Joo-yeon		
2016	The Gentlemen of Wolgyesu Tailor Shop	Choi Ji-yeon		
2016	Love in the Moonlight	Ae Sim-i		
2017	Frozen Love	Yoo Shin-yeong		
2017	Jugglers	Ma Bo-na		
2018	Wok of Love	Seol Dal-hee		
2020	The Spies Who Loved Me	Hwang Seo-ra		
2021	Chimera	Kim Hyo-kyung		
2022	Again My Life	Han Ji-hyun		
2023	The Heavenly Idol	Redlin	Cameo	
2023	The Real Has Come!	Jang Se-jin		
2025	The Queen Who Crowns	Queen Wongyeong		
2026	Climax	Lee Yang-mi		

=== Web series ===
Year	Title	Role	Notes	Ref.
2022	Ultimate Weapon Alice	Yang Yang		
2022–2023	The Glory	Choi Hye-jeong	Part 1–2	

== Ambassadorship ==
- Public relations ambassador at the 43rd Golden Photography Awards (2023)

== Awards and nominations ==
Name of the award ceremony, year presented, category, nominee of the award, and the result of the nomination
Award ceremony	Year	Category	Nominee / Work	Result	Ref.
APAN Star Awards	2023	Excellence Award, Actress in a Serial Drama	The Real Has Come!	Nominated	
APAN Star Awards	2025	Top Excellence Award, Actress in a Miniseries	The Queen Who Crowns	Won	
Asia Artist Awards	2025	Best Actor – Female	Cha Joo-young	Won	
Blue Dragon Series Awards	2023	Best New Actress	The Glory	Nominated	
Blue Dragon Series Awards	2025	Best Actress	The Queen Who Crowns	Nominated	
Golden Cinema Film Festival	2023	Special OTT Performance Award	The Glory	Won	
KBS Drama Awards	2018	Best New Actress	Jugglers	Nominated	
MBC Drama Awards	2020	Best Supporting Actress	The Spies Who Loved Me	Nominated	
SBS Drama Awards	2022	Best Supporting Actress in a Miniseries Genre/Fantasy Drama	Again My Life	Nominated	
