= High Society (2018 film) =

2018 film by Byun Hyuk

- Theatrical release poster
- Hangul: 상류사회
- RR: Sangnyusahoe
- MR: Sangnyusahoe
- Directed by: Byun Hyuk
- Written by: Byun Hyuk
- Produced by: Kim Chul-yong
- Starring: Park Hae-il; Soo Ae
- Cinematography: Park Se-seung
- Edited by: Kim Seo-hee
- Music by: Jang Young-kyu
- Production company: Hive Media Corp.
- Distributed by: Lotte Entertainment (South Korea); Netflix (International)
- Release date: August 29, 2018
- Running time: 119 minutes
- Country: South Korea
- Language: Korean
- Box office: US$5.6 million

High Society is a 2018 South Korean drama film directed by Byun Hyuk. It stars Park Hae-il and Soo Ae. The film was released in South Korea on August 29, 2018.

== Plot ==
Tae-jun and Soo-yeon are a married couple who, despite their relatively young age, have achieved high status thanks to their exceptional abilities. Tae-jun is a professor at the Seoul National University, while Soo-yeon is the deputy director of an art gallery.

However, they both harbor a strong ambition to climb even higher. Tae-jun gains national attention after proposing a low-interest citizen's bank as a solution to gentrification and heroically saving an elderly man who attempted self-immolation during a protest. He ends up receiving a nomination from the conservative party. Meanwhile, Soo-yeon, who had been aiming for the director position but was constantly pushed aside by a conglomerate-backed director and junior staff, decides to actively support her husband's bid for parliament in order to gain influence.

But Tae-jun begins an affair with a young female aide who was once his student. Despite their physical intimacy and constant presence together, Soo-yeon knowingly overlooks the affair for the sake of her ambition.

Around the same time, Soo-yeon also rekindles a relationship with her ex-boyfriend, a promising artist, leading to an affair that continues all the way to Paris, where they are filmed having sex on camera. Unfortunately, the footage ends up in the hands of Chief Min, her rival for the director position, threatening Soo-yeon's ambitions. Unlike Tae-jun's affair, hers now risks exposure.

In a desperate move, Soo-yeon seduces the chairman of the conglomerate that owns the gallery, offering herself in exchange for the directorship. The chairman is someone who claims to create "art" by having sex with celebrities on canvas and preserving the imprints.

Meanwhile, Tae-jun, now a conservative party candidate, attempts to secure funding for the citizen bank from corporations. But he later discovers the party is colluding with those very corporations, using the citizen bank merely as a political tool. It is revealed that even the elderly man he rescued had been paid off to stage the incident.

Just before Soo-yeon consummates her deal with the chairman, the current director, his wife, storms in, turning the tables. Soo-yeon then offers the director a compromising video of the chairman in exchange for power, ultimately becoming co-director alongside the chairman's son.

In the end, unable to endure their sordid lives, Soo-yeon and Tae-jun make a bold decision. On the opening day of a new exhibition, Soo-yeon publicly screens her own sex tape as an art piece, delivering a self-critical confession of her desires and exposing the corruption within the gallery. She receives applause from Tae-jun and the audience.

Tae-jun gives up his seat in parliament and hands over evidence of the conservative party's corruption to a prosecutor. The two are shown having liberated themselves from their ambitions and elite trappings. Tae-jun now runs a small-scale citizen bank, while Soo-yeon operates her own independent exhibition space.

== Cast ==
- Park Hae-il as Jang Tae-joon
- Soo Ae as Oh Soo-yeon
- Yoon Je-moon as Han Yong-suk
- Ra Mi-ran as Lee Hwa-ran
- Lee Jin-wook as Shin Ji-ho
- Kim Kyu-sun as Park Eun-ji
- Han Joo-young as Min Hyun-ah
- Park Joo-hee as Reporter Yoon
- Park Sung-hoon as Jason
- Kim Kang-woo as Baek Kwang-hyun
- Lee Hong-nae as Intern
- Mao Hamasaki as Minami Oshima

== Production ==
Principal photography began on November 1, 2017. Production ended on January 11, 2018.

== Reception ==
The film was released on August 29, 2018, in South Korea, showing at 867 screens across the country. During its opening day, the film finished second, trailing behind On Your Wedding Day by attracting 131,802 moviegoers with US$775,270 gross. It became the domestic R-rated film with the biggest opening day for 2018. However, the film dropped to third place during the weekend, finishing behind On Your Wedding Day and new release of the week Searching by attracting 291,228 moviegoers with US$2.4 million gross. It suffered a 72.5% gross drop during its second weekend, finished at fourth place with US$643,039 from 85,522 attendance.

As of September 10, 2018, the film attracted 766,031 total admission with US$5.6 million gross.
