= List of School series cast members =

This is a list of cast members of the South Korean anthology television series School produced by KBS2. The series have been noted for fielding an entirely different cast in every season of the series. In addition to the core cast members, the School series team also includes several recurring guests throughout each season.

It is also been famous for launching the careers of several rookie actors and actresses.

== Main cast ==
Actor	Season							
Actor	School 1	School 2	School 3	School 4	School 2013	School 2015	School 2017	School 2021
Actor	1999	1999-2000	2000-2001	2001-2002	2012-2013	2015	2017	2021
=== Students ===
Jang Hyuk	check							
Choi Kang-hee	check							
Kim Gyu-ri (Note: Credited as Kim Min-sun.)	check							
Yang Dong-geun	check							
Bae Doona	check							
Soo Ae	check							
Ha Ji-won		check						
Shim Ji-ho		check						
Kim Min-hee		check						
Kim Heung-soo		check						
Ki Tae-young		check						
Kim Rae-won		check						
Jae Hee		check						
Lee Yo-won		check						
Lee Dong-wook		check	check					
Lee In-hye			check					
Park Gwang-hyun			check					
Zo In-sung			check					
Oh Soo-min			check					
Yeo Wook-hwan				check				
Won Sang-yun				check				
Im Soo-jung				check				
Baek Sung-woo				check				
Kim Bo-kyung				check				
Gong Yoo				check				
Lee Yu-ri				check				
Lee Jong-suk					check			
Kim Woo-bin					check			
Park Se-young					check			
Ryu Hyo-young					check			
Kim So-hyun						check		
Nam Joo-hyuk						check		
Yook Sung-jae						check		
Kim Se-jeong							check	
Kim Jung-hyun							check	
Jang Dong-yoon							check	
Kim Yo-han								check
Choo Young-woo								check
Cho Yi-hyun								check
Hwang Bo-reum-byeol								check
=== School staff ===
Lee Chang-hoon	check							
Yum Jung-ah	check							
Seo Kap-sook	check	check						
Ahn Hong-jin		check	check					
Cho Jae-hyun			check					
Park Joo-mi			check					
Im Sung-min			check					
Yang Hee-kyung			check			check		
Yeon Kyu-jin				check				
Jung Jong-joon				check				
Jo Min-ki				check				
Son Hyun-joo				check				
Jang Na-ra					check			
Choi Daniel					check			
Lee Pil-mo						check		
Han Joo-wan							check	
Jeon Seok-ho								check
=== Others ===
Jeon Mi-seon						check		
Han Sun-hwa							check	
Park In-hwan								check

== Supporting cast ==
Actor	Season							
Actor	School 1	School 2	School 3	School 4	School 2013	School 2015	School 2017	School 2021
Actor	1999	1999-2000	2000-2001	2001-2002	2012-2013	2015	2017	2021
=== Supporting students ===
Kim Jung-wook	check							
Ahn Jae-mo	check							
Park Si-eun	check							
Oh Joo-yi	check							
Jo Jae-wan	check							
Im Seo-yeon	check							
Choi Young-wan	check							
Jang Yang-gyun	check		check					
Do Ji-won	check							
Go Ho-kyung		check						
Kim Min-joo		check						
Cho So-young		check						
Lee Jung-ho		check						
Kim Sung-joon		check						
Kwon Ji-hye		check						
Go Dong-hyun		check						
Go Eun-chae		check						
Cho Jae-hyun		check						
Park Joo-mi		check	check					
Chae Si-ah			check					
Han Hee			check					
Seo Jae-kyung			check					
Jang Tae-sung			check					
Lee Eun-young			check					
No Sung-eun			check					
Lee Soo-rang			check					
Jo Da-eun			check					
Lee Dae-gun			check					
Yoon Ji-hoon			check					
Ahn Sung-hun			check					
Baek Sung-woo				check				
Han Min				check				
Song Joo-hwan				check				
Lee Sang-in				check				
Kim Bo-kook				check				
Park Ji-eun				check				
Hwang Kyu-rim				check				
Jung In-ji				check				
Choi Chang-yeob					check			
Kwak Jung-wook					check			
Kim Young-choon					check			
Kim Dong-suk					check			
Kim Chang-hwan					check			
Kim Dani					check			
Lee Yi-kyung					check			
Lee Ji-hoon					check			
Shin Hye-sun					check			
Gil Eun-hye					check			
Jeon Soo-jin					check			
Nam Kyung-min					check			
Kim Min-kyung					check			
Kim Jong-hyun					check			
Oh Ga-eun					check			
Jung Yun-soo					check			
Ahn Ji-hyun					check			
Lee Kyu-hwan					check			
Kang Sung-ha					check			
Kim Bom-yi					check			
Kim Sol					check			
Kim Ji-ah					check			
Kim Hae-rim					check			
Moon Ji-woo					check			
Park So-hee					check			
Oh Se-il					check			
Lee Jung-kwi					check			
Lee Hye-sung					check			
Choi Min-ji					check			
Choi Soo-mi					check			
Lee David						check		
Kim Hee-jung						check		
Lee Cho-hee						check		
Cho Soo-hyang						check		
Park Doo-shik						check		
Lee Hwa-kyum						check		
Jang In-sub						check		
Kim Bo-ra						check		
Lee Jin-kwon						check		
Kwon Eun-soo						check		
Kim Min-seok						check		
Choi Hyo-eun						check		
Lee Seung-ho						check		
Ji Ha-yoon						check		
Oh Woo-jin						check		
Seo Cho-won						check		
Park Ah-sung						check		
Jang Ye-ji						check		
Jo Byeong-kyu						check		
Han Sung-yun						check		
Lee Jin-gwon						check		
Seol In-ah							check	
Rowoon							check	
Seo Ji-hoon							check	
Ha Seung-ri							check	
Kim Hee-chan							check	
Park Se-wan							check	
Hong Kyung							check	
Han Bo-bae							check	
Ji Hye-ran							check	
Kim Min-ha							check	
Song Yoo-jung							check	
Lee Joon-woo							check	
Ahn Seung-gyun							check	
Choi Sung-min							check	
Kim Kang-min								check
Seo Hee-sun								check
Yoon Yi-re								check
Lee Sang-jun								check
Lee Ha-eun								check
Kim Nu-rim								check
Kim Jin-gon								check
Park Ga-ryul								check
Jung Ye-seo								check
Kim Cha-yoon								check
=== Supporting school staff ===
Shin Goo	check							
Kang Seok-woo	check							
Lee Hye-sook	check	check						
Myung Kye-nam	check	check	check					
Lee Han-wi	check				check			
Jun Won-joo			check					
Kim Mi-hee				check				
Kim Yoon-kyung				check				
Um Hyo-sup					check			
Park Hae-mi					check			
Oh Young-sil					check			
Yoon Joo-sang					check			
Kwon Nam-hee					check			
Kim Yun-ah					check			
Lee Won-suk					check			
Ahn Hye-kyung					check			
Jeon No-min						check		
Lee Hee-do						check		
Shin Jung-geun						check		
Choi Dae-chul						check		
Jung Soo-young						check		
Lee Si-won						check		
Kim Jin-yi						check		
Lee Jong-won							check	
Kim Eung-soo							check	
Park Chul-min							check	
Lee Jae-yong							check	
Min Sung-wook							check	
Jo Mi-ryung							check	
Kim Kyu-seon								check
Lee Ji-ha								check
Park Geun-rok								check
Shin Cheol-jin								check
Im Jae-geun								check
=== Extended ===
Moon Hyuk	check		check					
Lee Joo-suk		check						
Choi Sung-joon			check					
Baek Bong-ki				check				
Seo Seung-ah				check				
Kim Na-woon					check			
Lee Yun-kyung					check			
Lee Dae-yeon						check		
Kim Jung-nan						check		
Jung In-gi						check		
Kim Se-ah						check		
Jo Duk-hyun						check		
Jung Jae-eun						check		
Lee Jung-eun						check		
Kim Min-young						check		
Choi Su-rin						check		
Yoo Yeon-mi						check		
Jung In-seo						check		
Oh Yoon-hong						check		
Yoon Chae-min						check		
Yoo Se-hyung						check		
Lee Kang-min						check		
Lee Jae-in						check		
Park Hwan-hee						check		
Park Young-soo						check		
Seo Dong-hyun						check		
Kim Kwang-in						check		
Kim Min-gyu						check		
Kim Jin-yi						check		
Kang Ji-woo						check		
Go Woo-rim						check		
Kim Ye-joon						check		
Sung Ji-ru							check	
Kim Hee-jung							check	
Jang Se-hyun							check	
Mi Jung							check	
Kim Soo-jin							check	
Choo Kwi-jung							check	
Kim Jin-woo							check	
Shin Yun-sook							check	
Kim Sun-hwa							check	
Lee Jae-kyung							check	
Song Yoo-hyun							check	
Kim Soo-jin								check
Kim Ye-ji								check
Jo Seung-yeon								check
Seo Jae-woo								check
Jo Ryeon								check

== Cameo appearances ==
Actor	Season							
Actor	School 1	School 2	School 3	School 4	School 2013	School 2015	School 2017	School 2021
Actor	1999	1999-2000	2000-2001	2001-2002	2012-2013	2015	2017	2021
=== Students (cameos) ===
Ryu Hyun-kyung		check						
Soo Ae		check						
Chun Jung-myung		check						
Kang Min-hyuk							check	
Moon Woo-jin								check
=== School staff (cameos) ===
Bae Soo-bin						check		
Sam Hammington						check		
=== Others (cameos) ===
Jung Si-ah		check						
Jo Young-jin					check			
Lee Hyun-suk							check	
Ahn Tae-joon							check	
Kim Song							check	
Kim Bo-kyung							check	
Lee Jae-seo							check	
Kwon Se-rin							check	
Shin Joo-hang							check	
Won Jin-ho							check	
Kim Si-eun							check	
Jung Yo-han							check	
Park Hye-young							check	
Lee Yoon-ji							check	
Kim Jin-sung							check	
Choi Moon-kyung							check	
Yoo Chae-mok							check	
Lee Se-rang							check	
Park Ji-yun							check	
Kim Jae-chul							check	
Yoo In-soo							check	
Jo Jae-hyun							check	
So Joon-hyung							check	
Lee Mi-kyung							check	
Park Ok-chool							check	
