= List of South Korean actresses =

This is a list of South Korean television, film, musical, theatre, and voice actresses who are active in South Korea. Names are listed as stage name.

== A ==
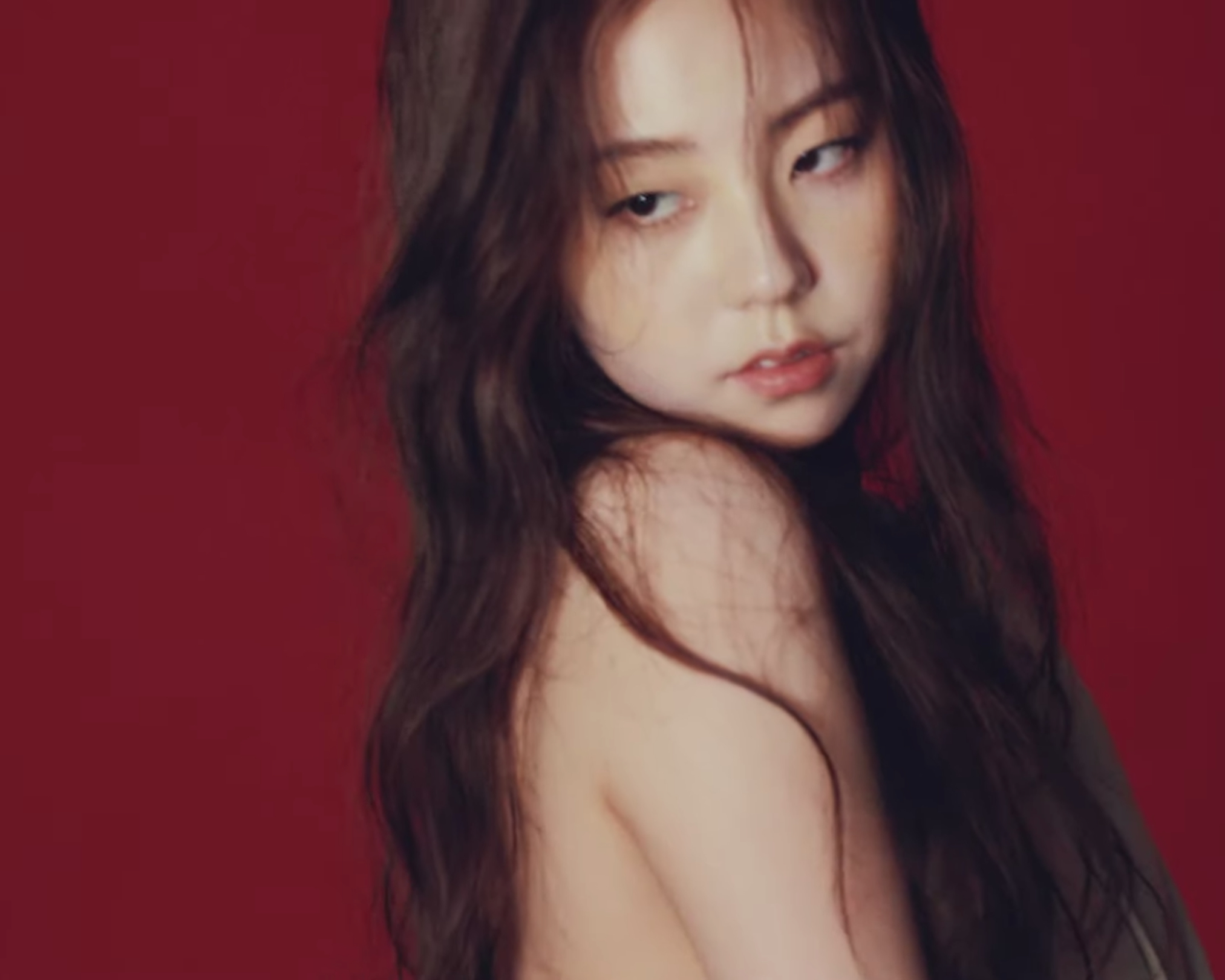
Ahn So-hee

- Ah Young
- Ahn Eun-jin
- Ahn In-sook
- Ahn Ji-hye
- Ahn Ji-hyun
- Ahn Seo-hyun
- Ahn Si-ha
- Ahn So-hee
- Ahn So-young
- Ahn Sol-bin
- Arin

== B ==
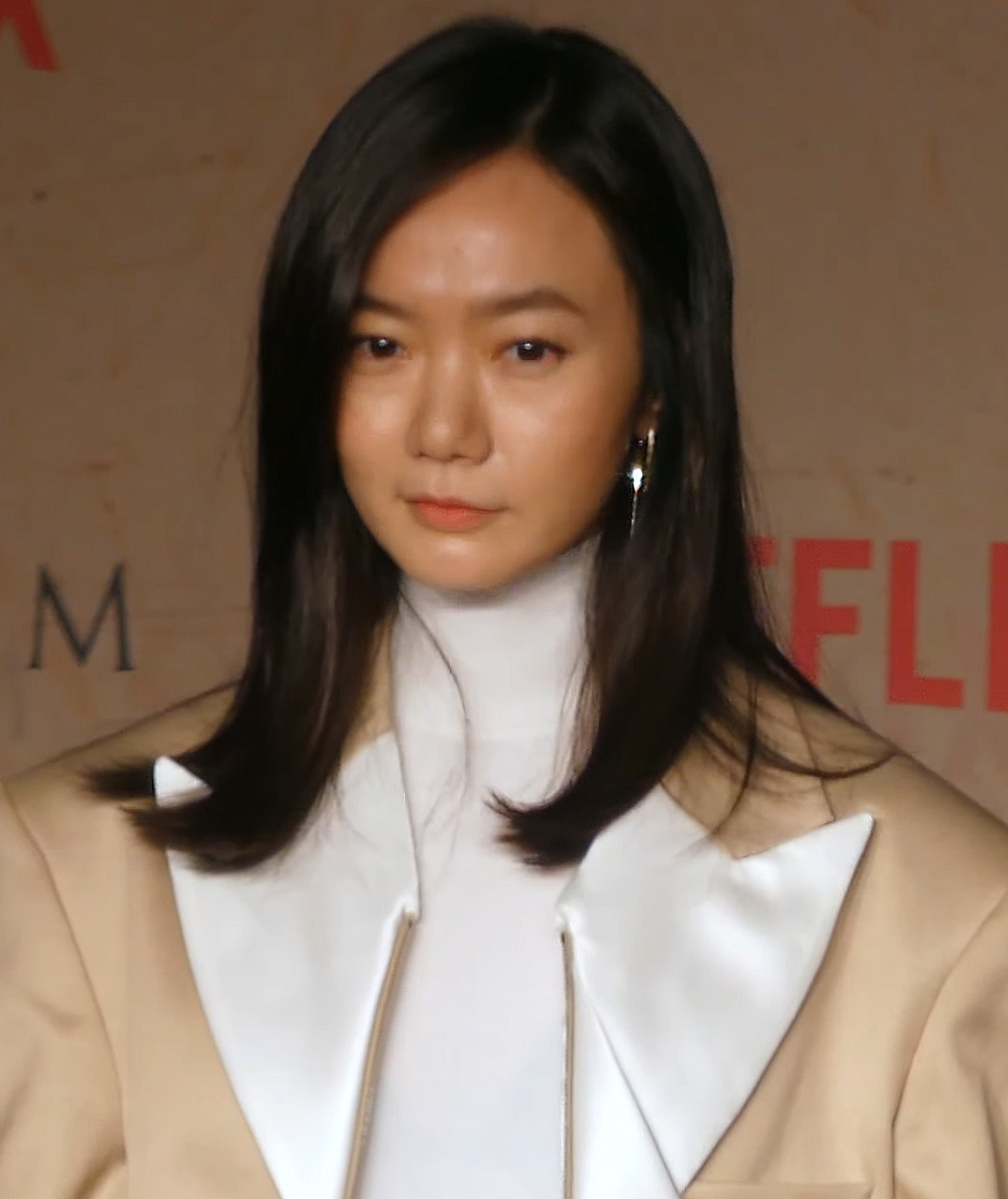
Bae Doona

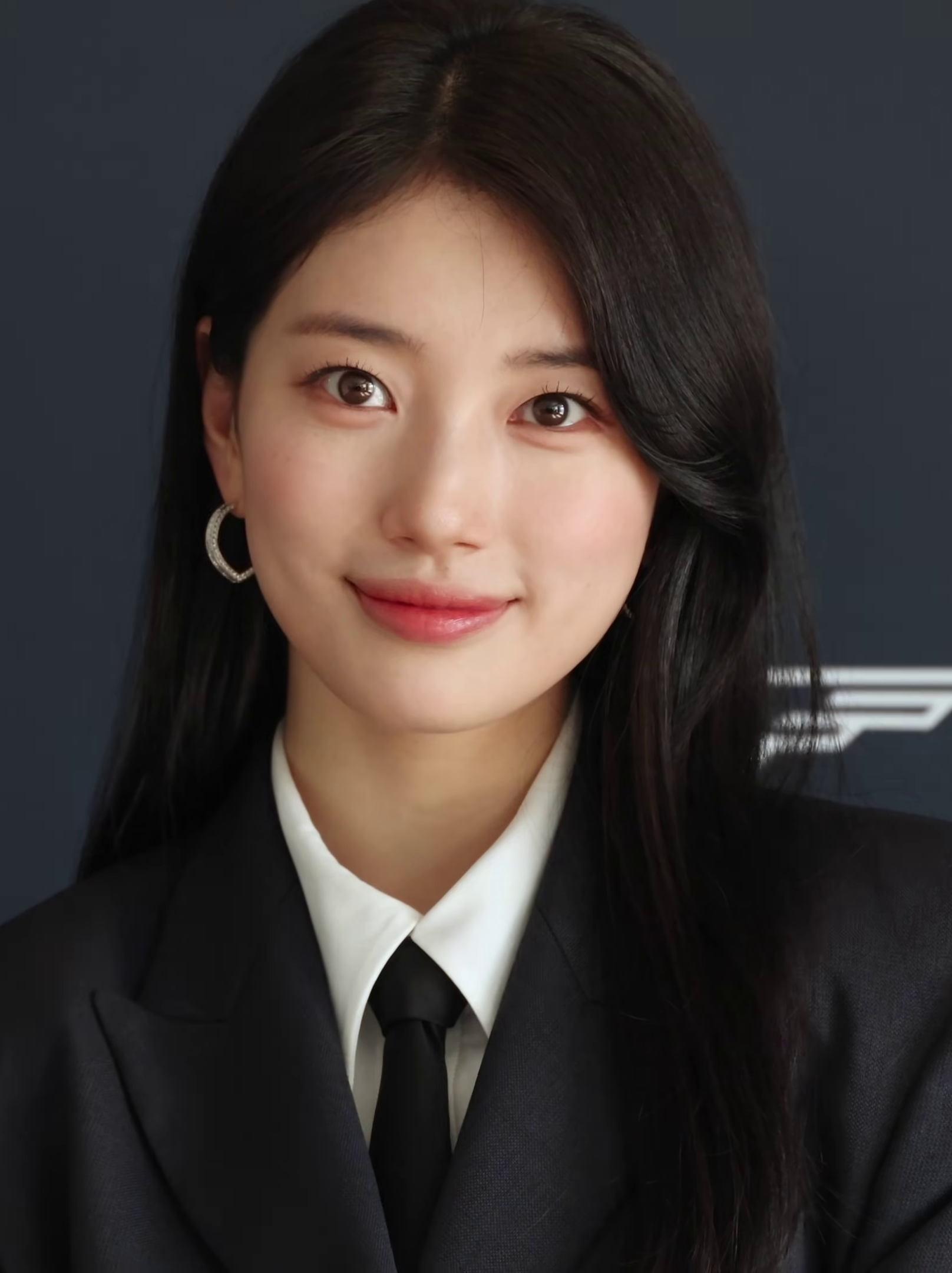
Bae Suzy

- Bae Da-bin
- Bae Doona
- Bae Geu-rin
- Bae Hae-sun
- Bae Jeong-min
- Bae Jong-ok
- Bae Noo-ri
- Bae Seul-ki
- Bae Suzy
- Bae Woo-hee
- Bae Yoon-kyung
- Baek Eun-hye
- Baek Hyun-joo
- Baek Ji-won
- Baek Jin-hee
- Baek Joo-hee
- Baek Ok-dam
- Baek Seo-yi
- Baek Seung-hee
- Baek Soo-hee
- Bak Seon-yeong
- Bak Sin-hee
- Bak So-ra
- Bak Yeong-hee
- Ban Hyo-jung
- Ban Se-jung
- Bang Eun-hee
- Bang Eun-jin
- Bang Eun-jung
- Bang Min-ah
- Bibi
- BoA
- Bona
- Bora
- Byun Jung-soo

== C ==
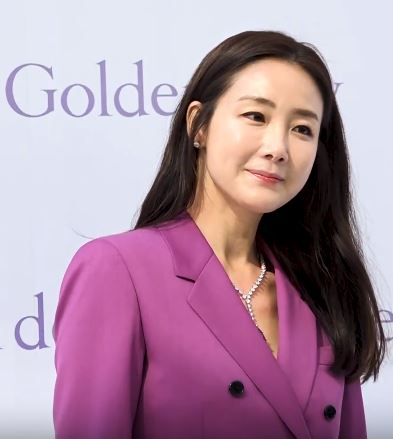
Choi Ji-woo

- Cha Chung-hwa
- Cha Hwa-yeon
- Cha Ji-yeon
- Cha Joo-young
- Cha Jung-won
- Cha Mi-kyung
- Cha Min-ji
- Cha Soo-yeon
- Cha Ye-ryun
- Chae Bin
- Chae Eui-jin
- Chae Jung-an
- Chae Min-seo
- Chae Rim
- Chae Seo-jin
- Chae Shi-ra
- Chae Soo-bin
- Chae Won-bin
- Chae Young-in
- Chang Mi-hee
- Cho Hye-jung
- Cho Hyun-jung
- Margaret Cho
- Cho Seung-hee
- Cho Soo-hyang
- Cho Yeo-jeong
- Cho Yi-hyun
- Cho Yu-jung
- Choi Bae-young
- Choi Eun-hee
- Choi Gyu-ri
- Choi Han-bit
- Choi Hee-jin
- Choi Hee-seo
- Choi Hwa-jung
- Choi Hyo-eun
- Choi Ja-hye
- Choi Ji-na
- Choi Ji-woo
- Choi Jin-sil
- Choi Jung-won
- Choi Jung-won
- Choi Jung-yoon
- Choi Kang-hee
- Choi Myung-bin
- Choi Myung-gil
- Choi Ran
- Choi Ri
- Choi Seong-woo
- Choi Seung-hee
- Choi Song-hyun
- Choi Soo-eun
- Choi Soo-in
- Choi Soo-jin
- Choi Soo-young
- Choi Su-rin
- Choi Sung-eun
- Choi Ye-bin
- Choi Ye-na
- Choi Yeo-jin
- Choi Yoo-jung
- Choi Yoo-jung
- Choi Yoon-so
- Choi Yoon-young
- Choi Yu-hwa
- Choi Yu-jin
- Choi Yu-ju
- Choo Ja-hyun
- Choo Soo-hyun
- Chu Sang-mi
- Chu Ye-jin
- Chun Woo-hee
- Chung Misook
- Chung Su-bin
- Chuu

== D ==
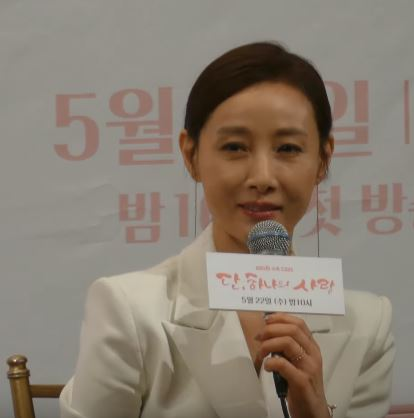
Do Ji-won

- Dahyun
- Dana
- Dawon
- Do Ji-won
- Do Kum-bong

== E ==
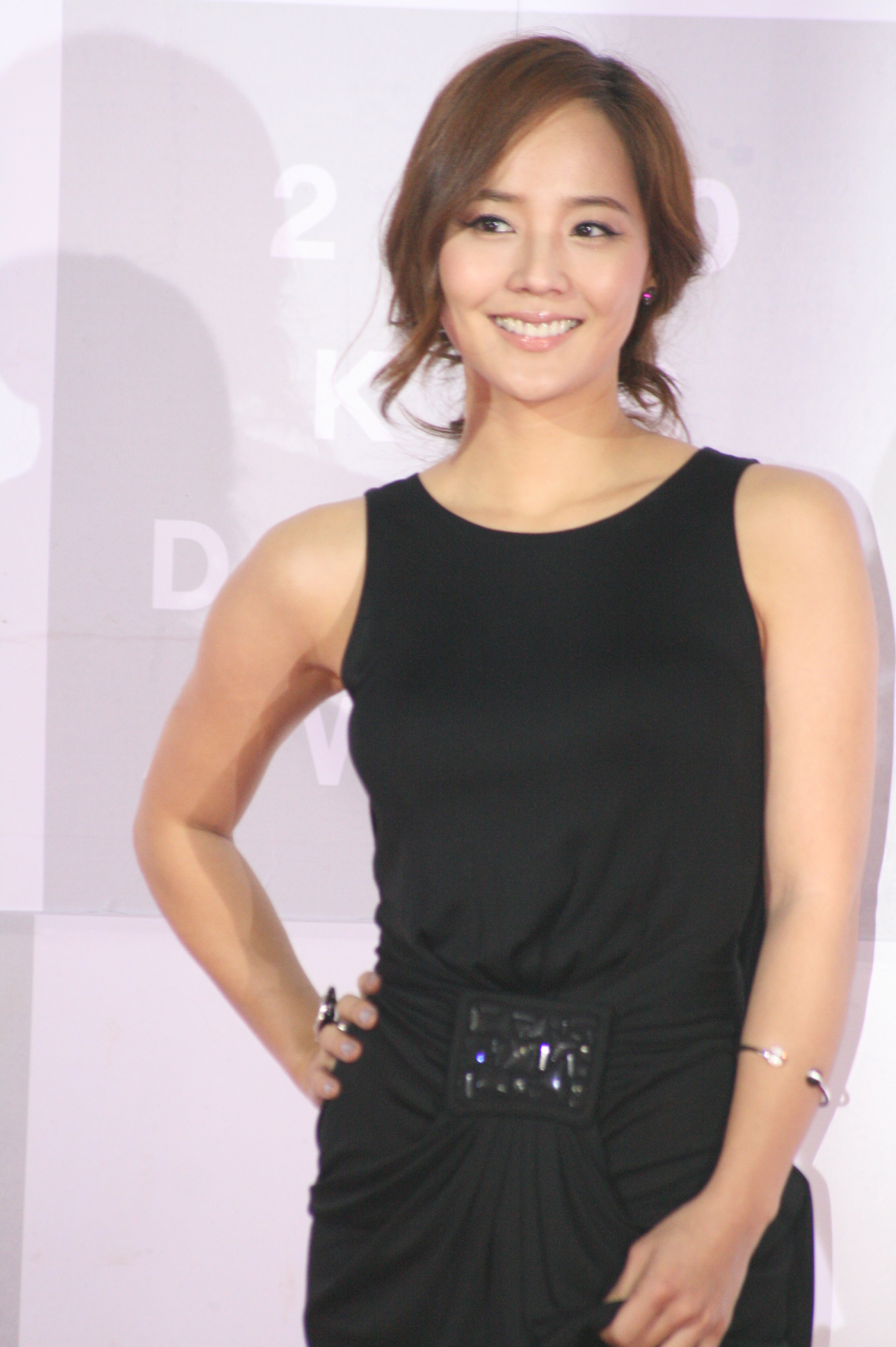
Eugene

- Eom Hyeon-jeong
- Esom
- Eugene
- Eunha
- Exy

== G ==
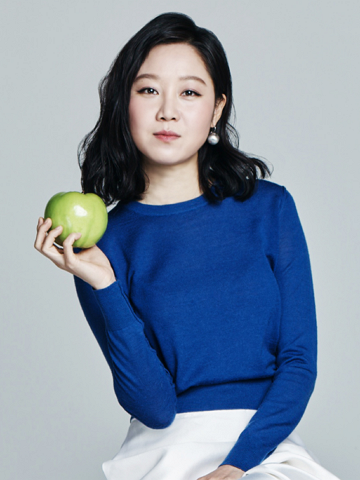
Gong Hyo-jin

- Ga Deuk-hee
- Gain
- Geum Bo-ra
- Gil Eun-hye
- Gil Hae-yeon
- Go Ah-sung
- Go Ara
- Go Bo-gyeol
- Go Doo-shim
- Go Eun-ah
- Go Hyun-jung
- Go Joon-hee
- Go Min-si
- Go Soo-hee
- Go Soo-jung
- Go Won-hee
- Go Woo-ri
- Go Youn-jung
- Gong Hyo-jin
- Gong Hyun-joo
- Gong Min-jeung
- Gong Seung-yeon
- Goo Hara
- Goo Jae-yee

== H ==
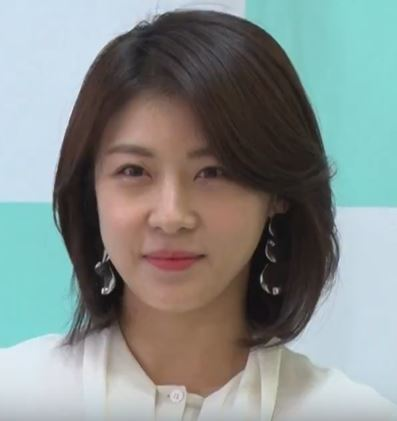
Ha Ji-won

- Ha Hee-ra
- Ha Jae-sook
- Ha Ji-won
- Ha Ji-young
- Ha Joo-hee
- Ha Seung-ri
- Ha Yeo-jin
- Ha Yeon-joo
- Ha Yeon-soo
- Ha Yoo-mi
- Ha Yoon-kyung
- Ha Young
- Hahm Eun-jung
- Han Bo-bae
- Han Bo-reum
- Han Chae-ah
- Han Chae-young
- Han Da-min
- Han Da-sol
- Han Eu-ddeum
- Han Eun-jung
- Han Ga-in
- Han Go-eun
- Han Groo
- Han Hye-jin
- Han Hye-ri
- Han Hye-rin
- Han Hye-sook
- Han Hyo-joo
- Han Ji-an
- Han Ji-eun
- Han Ji-hye
- Han Ji-hyun
- Han Ji-min
- Han Ji-wan
- Han Kyeong-hwa
- Han Na-na
- Han Seung-yeon
- Han So-eun
- Han So-hee
- Han Soo-yeon
- Han Sun-hwa
- Han Sung-yun
- Han Ye-ri
- Han Ye-seul
- Han Yeo-reum
- Yuny Han
- Hani
- Harisu
- Heo Ga-yoon
- Heo Jung-eun
- Heo Yi-jae
- Heo Yool
- Heyne
- Hong Ah-reum
- Hong Bi-ra
- Hong Eun-hee
- Hong Hwa-ri
- Hong Hwa-yeon
- Hong In-young
- Hong Ji-hee
- Hong Ji-yoon
- Hong Jin-kyung
- Hong Jin-young
- Hong Ri-na
- Hong Seo-young
- Hong Seung-hee
- Hong Soo-ah
- Hong Soo-hyun
- Hong Su-zu
- Hong Ye-ji
- Hong Yeo-jin
- Horan
- Huh Ji-won
- Hur Young-ji
- Hwang Bo-ra
- Hwang Bo-reum-byeol
- Hwang Geum-hee
- Hwang Hyun-hee
- Hwang In-young
- Hwang Jung-eum
- Hwang Seok-jeong
- Hwang Seung-eon
- Hwang Shin-hye
- Hwang Soo-jung
- Hwang Sun-hee
- Hwang Woo-seul-hye
- Hwang Young-hee
- Hwangbo
- Hyolyn
- Hyomin
- Hyun Jyu-ni
- Hyun Young

== I ==
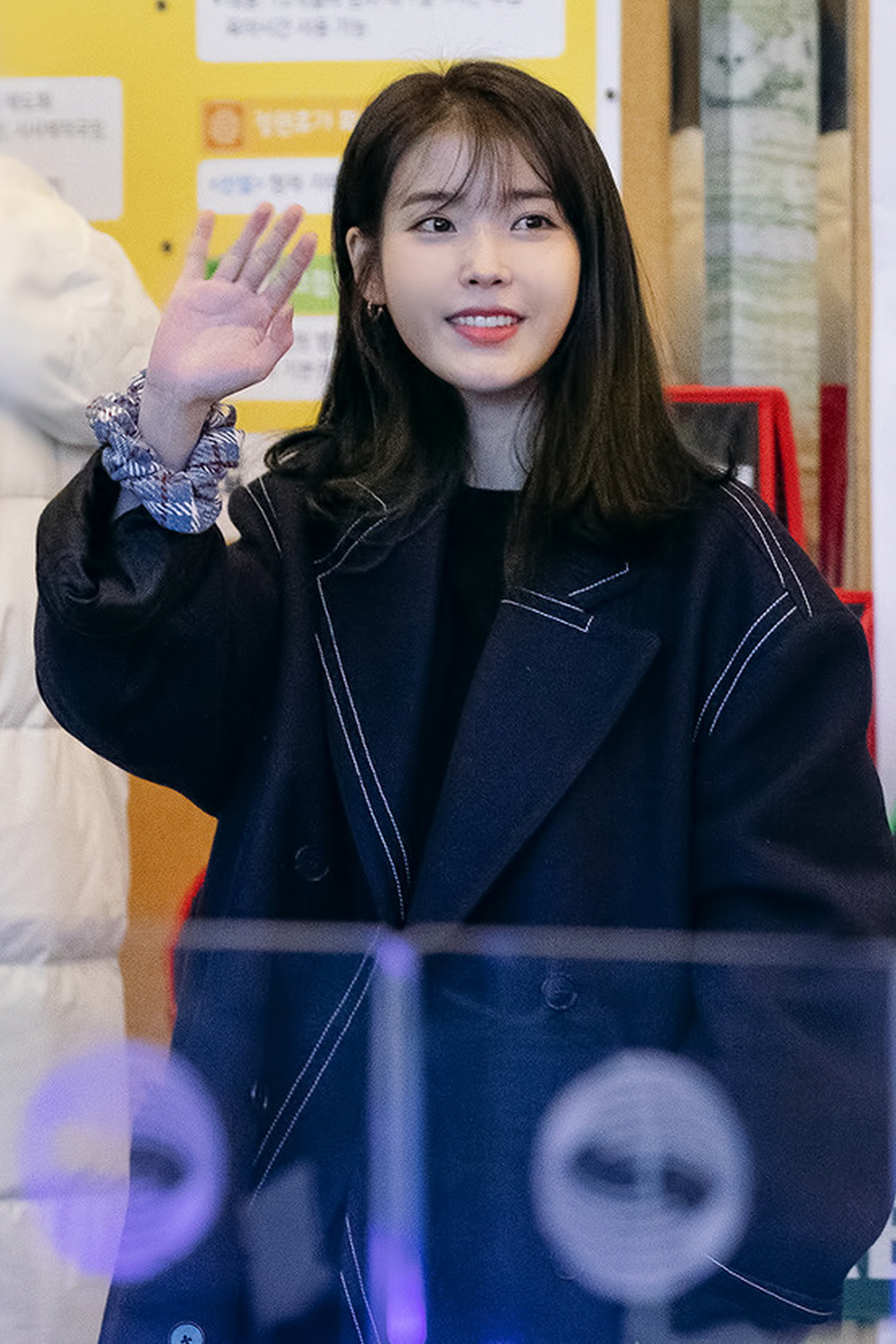
IU

- Im Do-hwa
- Im Ji-eun
- Im Jung-eun
- Im Se-mi
- Im Soo-hyang
- Im Soo-jung
- Im Ye-jin
- Irene
- IU
- Ivy

== J ==
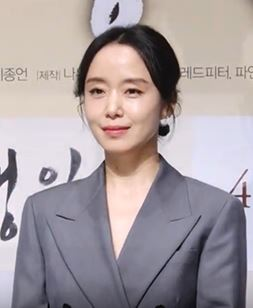
Jeon Do-yeon

- Jang Da-ah
- Jang Do-yeon
- Jang Gyu-ri
- Jang Hee-jin
- Jang Hee-jung
- Jang Hee-ryung
- Jang Hye-jin
- Jang Ja-yeon
- Jang Jin-young
- Jang Jung-hee
- Jang Liu
- Jang Mi-inae
- Jang Mi-ja
- Jang Na-ra
- Jang Seo-hee
- Jang Shin-young
- Jang So-yeon
- Jang Yoon-jeong
- Jang Yoon-ju
- Jang Young-nam
- Jang Young-ran
- Jeon Boram
- Jeon Chae-eun
- Jeon Do-yeon
- Jeon Hae-jin
- Jeon Hye-bin
- Jeon Hye-jin
- Jeon Hye-won
- Jeon In-hwa
- Jeon Ji-yoon
- Jeon Jong-seo
- Jeon Mi-do
- Jeon Mi-seon
- Jeon Min-seo
- Na-Young Jeon
- Jeon Ok
- Jeon So-min
- Jeon So-nee
- Jeon Soo-jin
- Jeon Soo-kyeong
- Jeon Su-ji
- Jeon Yeo-been
- Yeojin Jeon
- Jeon Yu-na
- Jeong Da-bin
- Jeong Da-hye
- Jeong Ga-eun
- Jeong Ha-dam
- Jeong Nam
- Jeong Sun-ah
- Jeong Ye-in
- Jeong Yu-mi
- Jeong Yun-hui
- Ji Ha-yoon
- Ji Hye-won
- Ji Joo-yeon
- Ji Woo
- Ji Yi-soo
- Jihae
- Jin Bora
- Jin Hee-kyung
- Jin Ji-hee
- Jin Ki-joo
- Jin Kyung
- Jin Se-yeon
- Jin Seo-yeon
- Jin So-yeon
- Jin Ye-ju
- Jin Ye-sol
- Jini
- Jisoo
- Jiyul
- Jo An
- Jo Aram
- Jo Bo-ah
- Jo Eun-ji
- Jo Eun-sook
- Jo Hye-joo
- Jo Jung-eun
- Jo Mi-ryeong
- Jo Mi-ryung
- Jo Min-su
- Jo Seo-hoo
- Jo Soo-min
- Jo Woo-ri
- Jo Ye-rin
- Jo Yeon-hee
- Jo Yi-jin
- Jo Yoon-hee
- Jo Yoon-su
- Jo Yun-seo
- Jo Yuri
- Joo
- Joo Da-young
- Joo Hae-eun
- Joo Hyun-young
- Joo In-young
- Joo Min-kyung
- Joo Ye-rim
- Joy
- Ju Jeung-ryu
- Jun Hyo-seong
- Jun Ik-ryoung
- Jun Ji-hyun
- Jung Ae-ri
- Jung Bo-min
- Jung Chae-yeon
- Jung Da-bin
- Jung Da-eun
- Jung Eun-chae
- Jung Eun-ji
- Jung Ho-yeon
- Jung Hye-in
- Jung Hye-sun
- Jung Hye-sung
- Jung Hye-young
- Jung In-seo
- Jung In-sun
- Jung Jae-eun
- Jung Jae-soon
- Jessica Jung
- Jung Ji-so
- Jung Ji-yoon
- Krystal Jung
- Jung Min-ah
- Nicole Jung
- Jung Ryeo-won
- Jung Shin-hye
- Jung So-min
- Jung Soo-young
- Sora Jung
- Jung Woon-sun
- Jung Ye-ji
- Jung Yi-seo
- Jung Yeon-joo
- Jung Yoo-jin
- Jung Yoo-min
- Jung Young-joo
- Jung Yu-mi

== K ==
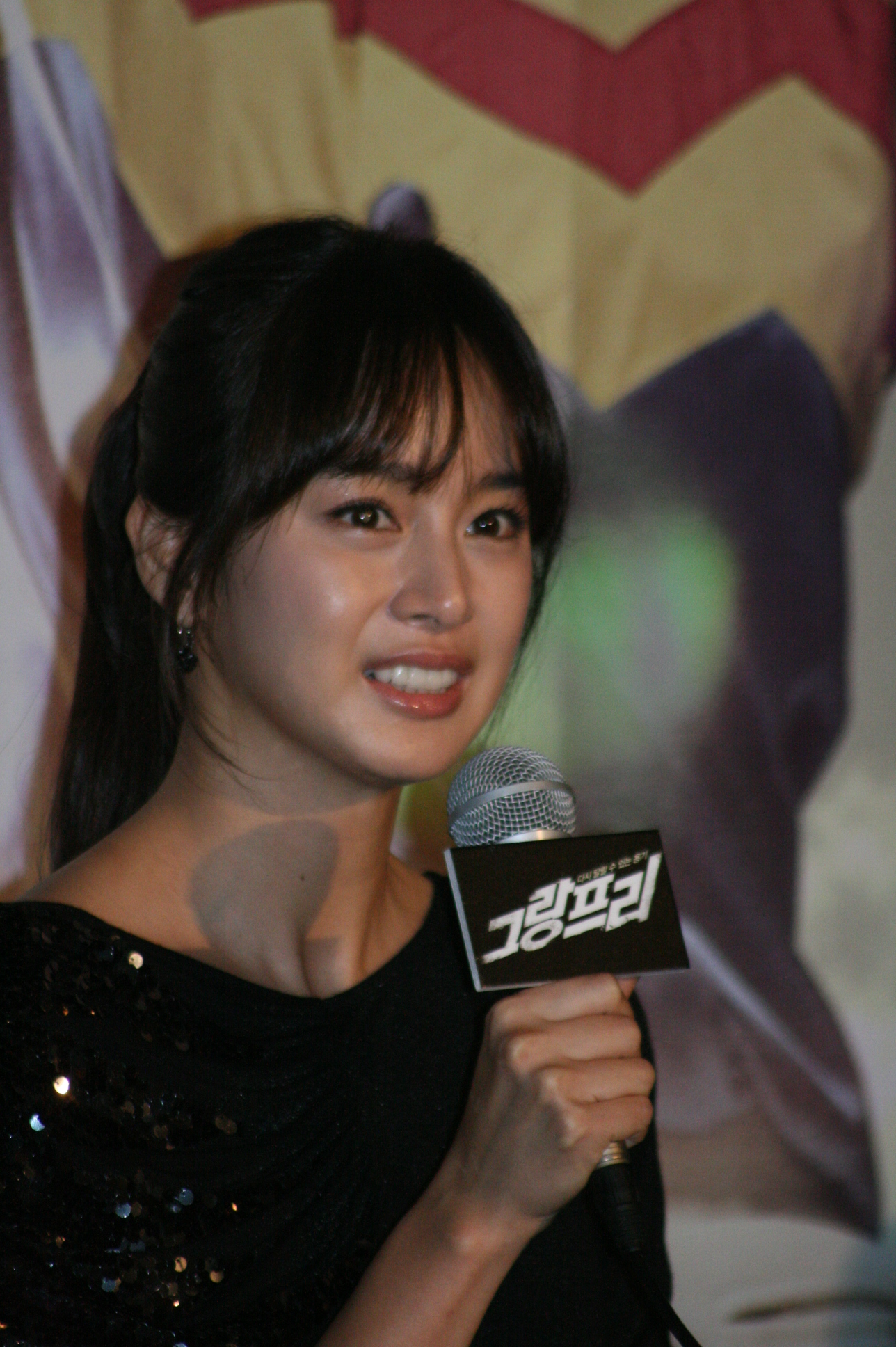
Kim Tae-hee

- Kahi
- Kal So-won
- Kan Mi-youn
- Kang Ae-shim
- Kang Boo-ja
- Kang Byul
- Kang Da-hyun
- Kang Eun-bi
- Kang Eun-jin
- Kang Han-na
- Kang Hye-jung
- Kang Hye-won
- Kang Hyo-shil
- Kang Ji-young
- Kang Kyung-hun
- Kang Mal-geum
- Kang Mi-na
- Kang Min-ah
- Kang Min-kyung
- Kang Na-eon
- Kang Rae-yeon
- Kang Se-jung
- Kang Seung-hyun
- Kang So-ra
- Kang Soo-jin
- Kang Soo-yeon
- Kang Sung-yeon
- Kang Susie
- Kang Ye-seo
- Kang Ye-won
- Kang Yu-mi
- Kei
- Kei Aran
- Keum Sae-rok
- Ki Hui-hyeon
- Kim Ae-ran
- Kim Ah-joong
- Kim Ah-young
- Kim Bo-kyung
- Kim Bo-mi
- Kim Bo-ra
- Kim Bo-yeon
- Kim Bo-yoon
- Kim Chae-yeon
- Kim Chae-yeon
- Claudia Kim
- Kim Da-mi
- Kim Da-som
- Kim Do-ah
- Kim Do-yeon
- Kim Do-yeon
- Kim Eul-dong
- Kim Ga-eun
- Kim Ga-yeon
- Kim Ga-young
- Kim Go-eun
- Kim Gook-hee
- Kim Gyu-ri
- Kim Gyu-ri
- Kim Gyu-seon
- Kim Ha-eun
- Kim Ha-neul
- Kim Ha-yeon
- Kim Hae-sook
- Kim Hee-ae
- Kim Hee-jung
- Kim Hee-jung
- Kim Hee-sun
- Kim Hieora
- Kim Ho-jung
- Kim Hwan-hee
- Kim Hyang-gi
- Kim Hye-eun
- Kim Hye-in
- Kim Hye-ja
- Kim Hye-jin
- Kim Hye-jun
- Kim Hye-ok
- Kim Hye-ri
- Kim Hye-soo
- Kim Hye-sun
- Kim Hye-yoon
- Kim Hyo-jin
- Kim Hyun
- Kim Hyun-joo
- Kim Hyun-soo
- Kim Hyun-sook
- Kim In-seo
- Kim Isak
- Kim Ja-ok
- Kim Jae-hwa
- Kim Jae-kyung
- Kim Ji-an
- Kim Ji-eun
- Kim Ji-ho
- Kim Ji-hyun
- Kim Ji-hyun
- Kim Ji-in
- Kim Ji-mee
- Kim Ji-min
- Kim Ji-min
- Kim Ji-soo
- Kim Ji-sook
- Kim Ji-sung
- Kim Ji-won
- Kim Ji-woo
- Kim Ji-yeong
- Kim Ji-young
- Kim Ji-young
- Kim Ji-young
- Kim Jin-kyung
- Kim Jin-yi
- Kim Jin-young
- Kim Joo-ah
- Kim Joo-ri
- Kim Joo-ryoung
- Kim Ju-hyun
- Kim Ju-yeon
- Kim Jung-ah
- Kim Jung-eun
- Kim Jung-hwa
- Kim Jung-nan
- Kim Jung-young
- Kim Kkot-bi
- Kim Mi-kyung
- Kim Mi-soo
- Kim Mi-sook
- Kim Min-ha
- Kim Min-hee
- Kim Min-hee
- Kim Min-ji
- Kim Min-ju
- Kim Min-jung
- Kim Min-seo
- Kim Min-seo
- Kim Min-young
- Kim Na-woon
- Kim Na-young
- Kim Nam-joo
- Kim Nam-joo
- Kim Ok-vin
- Kim Sa-rang
- Kim Sae-byuk
- Kim Sae-ron
- Kim Se-ah
- Kim Se-jeong
- Kim Seo-an
- Kim Seo-hyung
- Kim Seo-yeong
- Kim Seol-hyun
- Kim Seul-gi
- Kim Shin-rok
- Kim Shin-young
- Kim Si-a
- Kim Si-eun
- Kim Si-eun
- Kim Si-hyeon
- Kim So-eun
- Kim So-hee
- Kim So-hee
- Kim So-hye
- Kim So-hyun
- Kim So-hyun
- Kim So-jin
- Kim So-won
- Kim So-yeon
- Kim Soo-jin
- Kim Soo-mi
- Kim Sook
- Soy Kim
- Stephanie Kim
- Kim Su-an
- Kim Su-jung
- Kim Sun-a
- Kim Sun-young
- Kim Sun-young
- Kim Sung-eun
- Kim Sung-eun
- Kim Sung-kyung
- Kim Sung-ryung
- Kim Tae-hee
- Kim Tae-ri
- Kim Tae-rin
- Kim Tae-yeon
- Kim Won-hee
- Kim Ye-eun
- Kim Ye-ji
- Kim Ye-ryeong
- Kim Ye-won
- Kim Ye-won
- Kim Ye-won
- Kim Yeo-jin
- Kim Yi-kyung
- Kim Yong-ji
- Kim Yong-rim
- Kim Yoo-bin
- Kim You-jung
- Kim Yoo-mi
- Kim Yoo-ri
- Kim Yoo-yeon
- Kim Yoon-hye
- Kim Yoon-ji
- Kim Yoon-seo
- Kim Young-ae
- Kim Young-hee
- Kim Young-ok
- Kim Young-ran
- Kim Young-sun
- Kim Yu-bin
- Kim Yu-mi
- Kim Yuna
- Yunjin Kim
- Kisum
- Ko Eun-ah
- Ko Eun-mi
- Ko Joo-yeon
- Ko So-young
- Ko Sung-hee
- Koo Hye-sun
- Shine Kuk
- Kwak Hyun-hwa
- Kwak Ji-min
- Kwak Sun-young
- Kwon Ah-reum
- Kwon Chae-won
- Kwon Eun-bi
- Kwon Eun-bin
- Kwon Eun-soo
- Kwon Han-sol
- Kwon Hee-deok
- Kwon Mina
- Kwon Nara
- Kwon Ri-se
- Kwon So-hyun
- Kwon So-hyun
- Kwon Yu-ri
- Kyeon Mi-ri
- Kyung Soo-jin

== L ==
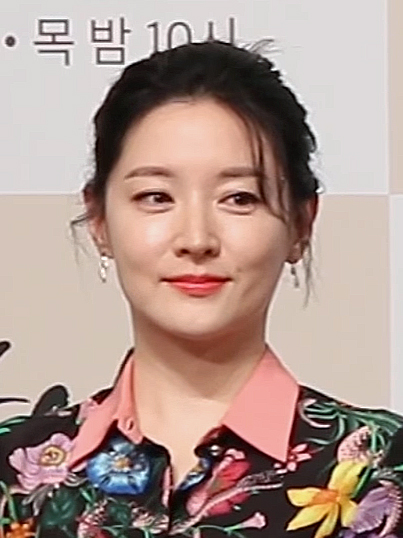
Lee Young-ae

- Lee Ae-jung
- Lee Ah-hyun
- Lee Ah-jin
- Lee Ahyumi
- Lee Bit-na
- Lee Bo-hee
- Lee Bo-ram
- Lee Bo-young
- Lee Bom
- Lee Bom-so-ri
- Lee Bong-ryun
- Lee Chae-eun
- Lee Chae-kyung
- Lee Chae-mi
- Lee Chae-yeon
- Lee Chae-young
- Lee Cho-hee
- Lee Chung-ah
- Lee Chung-mi
- Clara Lee
- Lee Da-hae
- Lee Da-hee
- Lee Da-in
- Lee Da-in
- Lee Da-yeon
- Lee E-dam
- Lee El
- Lee Elijah
- Lee Eun-ju
- Lee Eun-saem
- Lee Eun-sung
- Lee Eun-woo
- Lee Eung-kyung
- Lee Ga-hyun
- Lee Ga-ryeong
- Lee Geum-hee
- Lee Go-eun
- Lee Ha-na
- Lee Hae-in
- Lee Hae-in
- Lee Hanee
- Lee Hang-na
- Lee Hee-jin
- Lee Ho-jung
- Lee Hwa-kyum
- Lee Hwa-si
- Lee Hwi-hyang
- Lee Hye-in
- Lee Hye-ri
- Lee Hye-sook
- Lee Hye-young
- Lee Hye-young
- Lee Hyo-na
- Lee Hyun-joo
- Lee Il-hwa
- Lee In-hye
- Lee Jae-in
- Lee Ji-ah
- Lee Ji-eun
- Lee Ji-ha
- Lee Ji-hyun
- Lee Ji-hyun
- Lee Ji-won
- Lee Ji-woo
- Lee Jin
- Lee Jin-hee
- Lee Joo-bin
- Lee Joo-sil
- Lee Joo-woo
- Lee Joo-yeon
- Lee Joo-young
- Lee Joo-young
- Lee Joon-ha
- Lee Ju-eun
- Lee Ju-myoung
- Lee Jung-eun
- Lee Jung-hyun
- Lee Kan-hee
- Lee Kyung-jin
- Lee Lu-da
- Lee Mi-do
- Lee Mi-sook
- Lee Mi-yeon
- Lee Mi-young
- Lee Min-ji
- Lee Min-ji
- Lee Min-jung
- Lee Min-young
- Lee Na-eun
- Lee Na-yoon
- Lee Na-young
- Lee Nan-young
- Lee Re
- Lee Ruby
- Lee Sa-bi
- Lee Sang-hee
- Lee Se-eun
- Lee Se-hee
- Lee Se-mi
- Lee Se-na
- Lee Se-young
- Lee Se-young
- Lee Seo-el
- Lee Seol
- Lee Seol
- Lee Seon-hee
- Lee Seul-bi
- Lee Seung-yeon
- Lee Seung-yeon
- Lee Si-a
- Lee Si-won
- Lee Si-woo
- Lee Si-yeon
- Lee Si-young
- Lee So-yeon
- Lee Soo-kyung
- Lee Soo-kyung
- Lee Soo-mi
- Lee Soo-mi
- Lee Soo-min
- Lee Soo-min
- Lee Soo-young
- Stephanie Lee
- Lee Su-hyun
- Lee Su-ji
- Lee Sun-bin
- Sung-Hi Lee
- Lee Sung-kyung
- Lee Tae-im
- Lee Tae-ran
- Tomiko Lee
- Lee Ye-hyun
- Lee Yeon
- Lee Yeon-doo
- Lee Yeon-hee
- Lee Yo-won
- Lee Yoo-jin
- Lee Yoo-mi
- Lee Yoo-young
- Lee Yong-shin
- Lee Yong-yi
- Lee Yoon-ji
- Lee Yoon-mi
- Lee Young-ae
- Lee Young-ah
- Lee Young-eun
- Lee Young-ja
- Lee Young-jin
- Lee Young-yoo
- Lee Yu-bi
- Lee Yu-ri
- Lee Yul-eum
- Lim Eun-kyung
- Lim Hwa-young
- Lim Ji-yeon
- Lim Ju-eun
- Lim Na-young
- Lim Yoona
- Lina
- Lisa
- Luna

== M ==
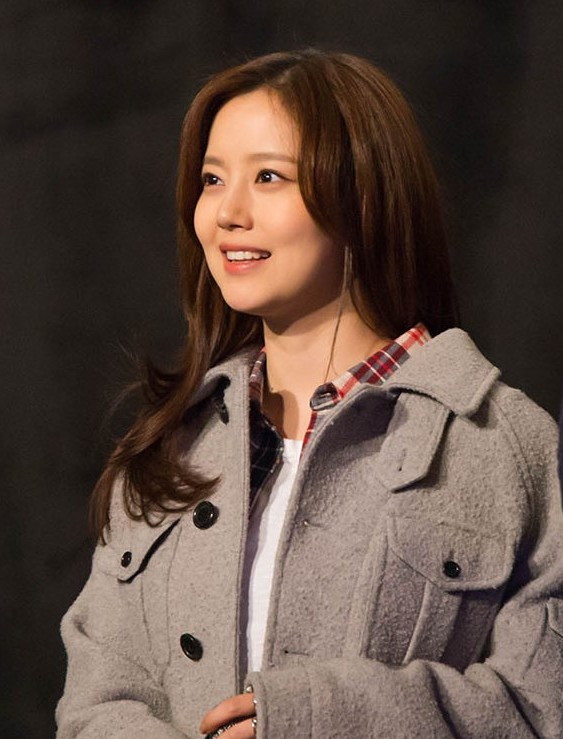
Moon Chae-won

- Maya
- MayBee
- Min
- Min Do-hee
- Min Hyo-rin
- Min Ji-hyun
- Min Young-won
- Minseo
- Minzy
- Miyeon
- Moon Chae-won
- Moon Ga-young
- Moon Geun-young
- Moon Hee
- Moon Hee-kyung
- Moon Jeong-hee
- Moon Ji-in
- Moon Nam-sook
- Moon Seung-you
- Moon So-ri
- Moon Sook
- Moon Ye-won
- Moonbyul
- Mun Seon-hui
- Myung Ji-yun
- Myung Se-bin

== N ==
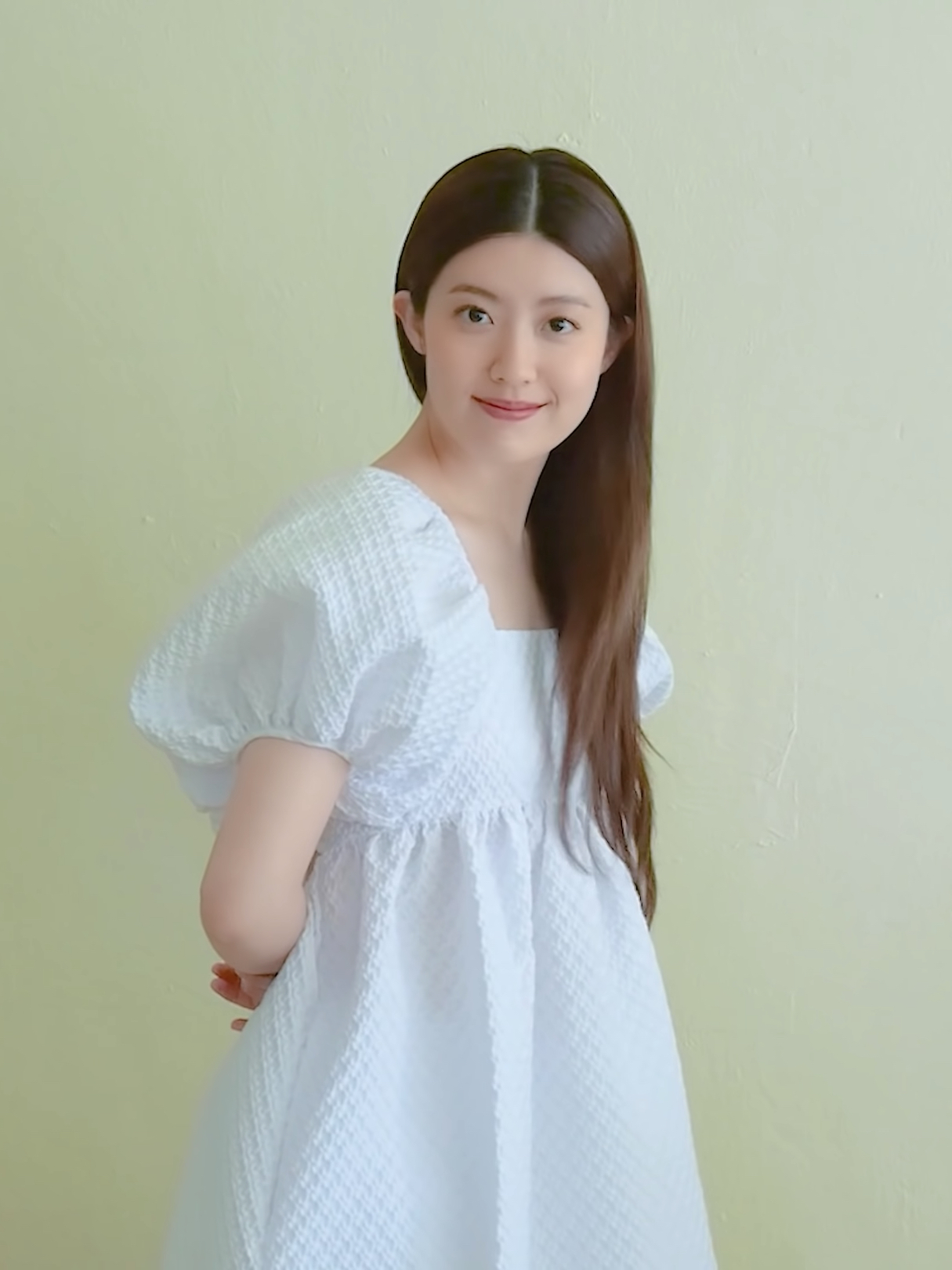
Nam Ji-hyun

- Na Hae-ryung
- Na Hye-mi
- Na Hyeon-hui
- Na Moon-hee
- Na O-mi
- Na Young-hee
- Yuri Nakamura
- Nam Bo-ra
- Nam Gi-ae
- Nam Gwon-a
- Nam Gyu-ri
- Nam Jeong-im
- Nam Ji-hyun
- Nam Ji-hyun
- Nam Sang-ji
- Nam Sang-mi
- Nam Yu-jin
- Nana
- Nancy
- Narsha
- NC.A
- Noh Haeng-ha

== O ==
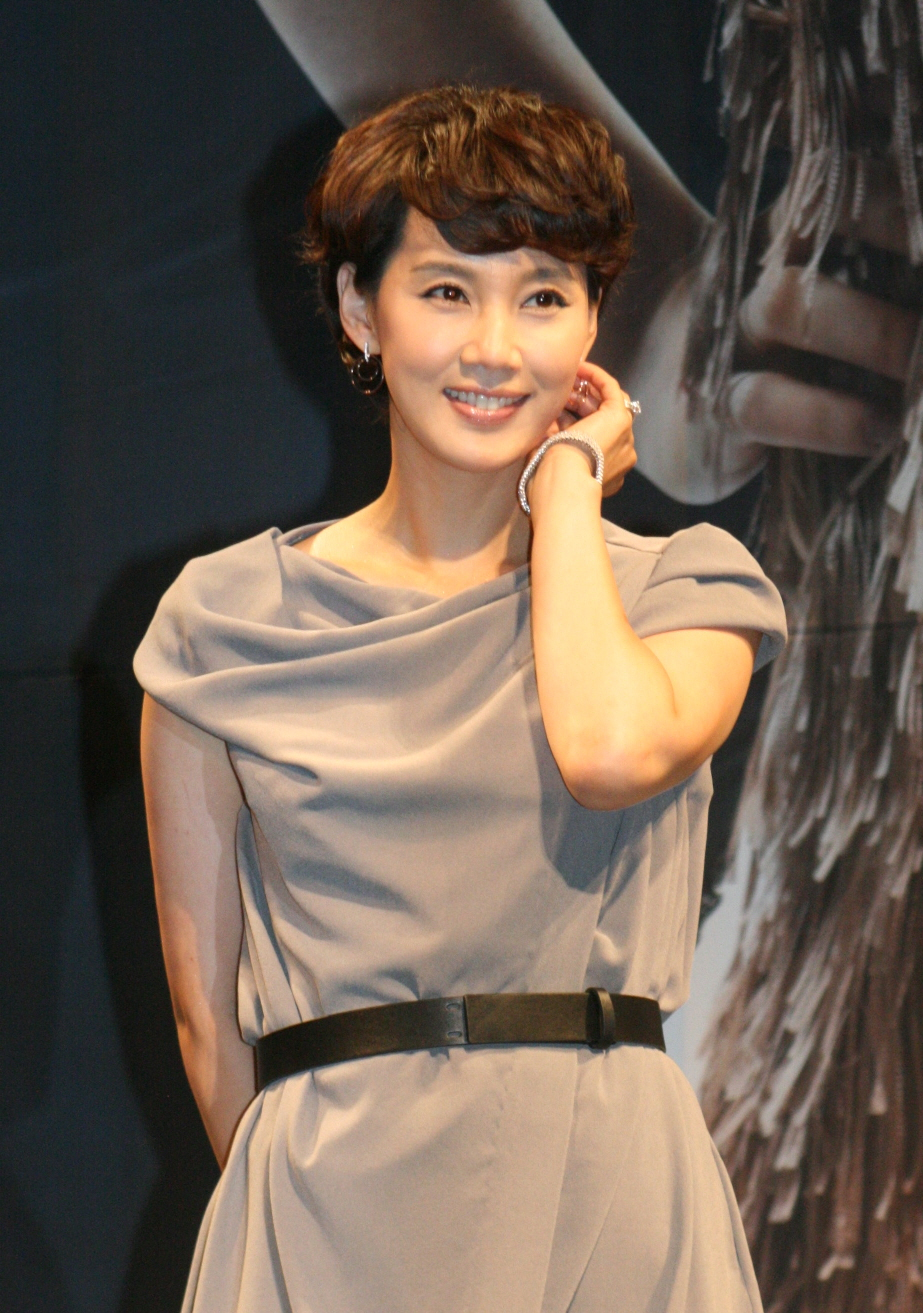
Oh Hyun-kyung

- Ock Joo-hyun
- Oh Ah-rin
- Oh Ah-yeon
- Oh Eun-seo
- Oh Ha-nee
- Oh Ha-young
- Oh Hye-soo
- Oh Hye-won
- Oh Hyun-kyung
- Oh In-hye
- Oh Ji-eun
- Oh Joo-yeon
- Oh Min-ae
- Oh Na-ra
- Oh Se-young
- Oh Seung-ah
- Oh Woo-ri
- Oh Ye-ju
- Oh Yeon-ah
- Oh Yeon-seo
- Oh Yeon-soo
- Oh Yoon-ah
- Oh Yoon-hong
- Ok Ja-yeon
- Ok So-ri
- Ok Ye-rin

== P ==
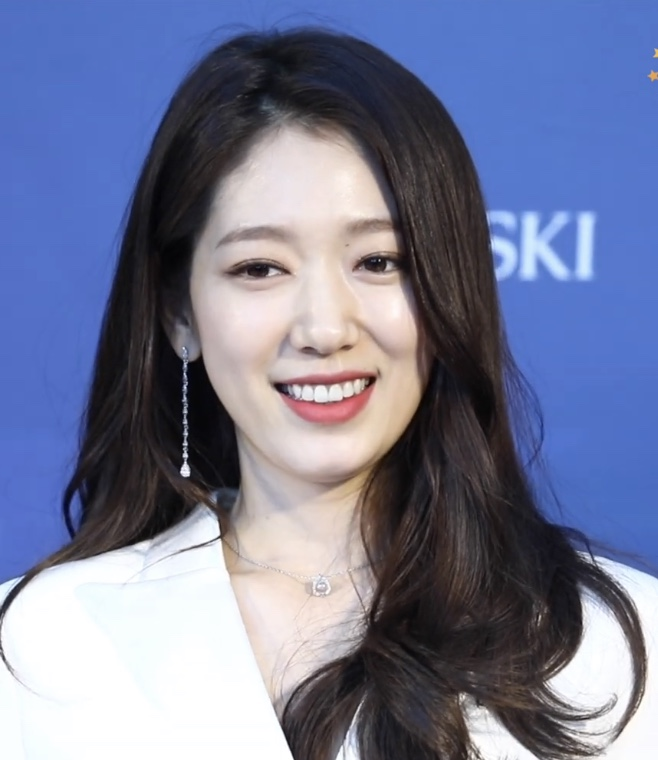
Park Shin-hye

- Christine Pak
- Park Ah-in
- Ashley Park
- Park Bo-kyung
- Park Bo-yeon
- Park Bo-young
- Park Cho-rong
- Park Eun-bin
- Park Eun-hye
- Park Eun-ji
- Greena Park
- Park Gyeong-ree
- Park Gyu-ri
- Park Gyu-young
- Park Ha-na
- Park Ha-sun
- Park Hae-mi
- Park Han-byul
- Park Han-sol
- Park Hee-jin
- Park Hee-jung
- Park Hee-von
- Park Hwan-hee
- Park Hye-su
- Park Hyo-joo
- Park In-young
- Park Jeong-hwa
- Park Jeong-ja
- Park Ji-ah
- Park Ji-ah
- Park Ji-hu
- Park Ji-hyun
- Park Ji-soo
- Park Ji-ye
- Park Ji-yeon
- Park Ji-yeon
- Park Ji-yoon
- Park Ji-young
- Park Jin-hee
- Park Jin-joo
- Jinri Park
- Park Joo-hee
- Park Joo-mi
- Park Joon-geum
- Park Ju-hyun
- Park Jung-ah
- Park Jung-soo
- Park Jung-yeon
- Park Kyung-hye
- Park Kyung-lim
- Park Mi-sun
- Park Min-ha
- Park Min-ji
- Park Min-jung
- Park Min-young
- Park Ri-won
- Sandara Park
- Park Sa-rang
- Park Se-hyun
- Park Se-wan
- Park Se-young
- Park Seo-kyung
- Park Seo-yeon
- Park Shin-hye
- Park Si-eun
- Park Si-eun
- Park Si-yeon
- Park So-dam
- Park So-hyun
- Park So-jin
- Park So-yeon
- Park So-yi
- Park Sol-mi
- Park Soo-jin
- Park Soo-young
- Park Subin
- Sun Park
- Park Sun-young
- Park Sung-yeon
- Park Won-sook
- Park Ye-eun
- Park Ye-jin
- Park Ye-young
- Park You-na
- Park Young-rin
- Park Yu-rim
- Pyo Ye-jin

== Q ==
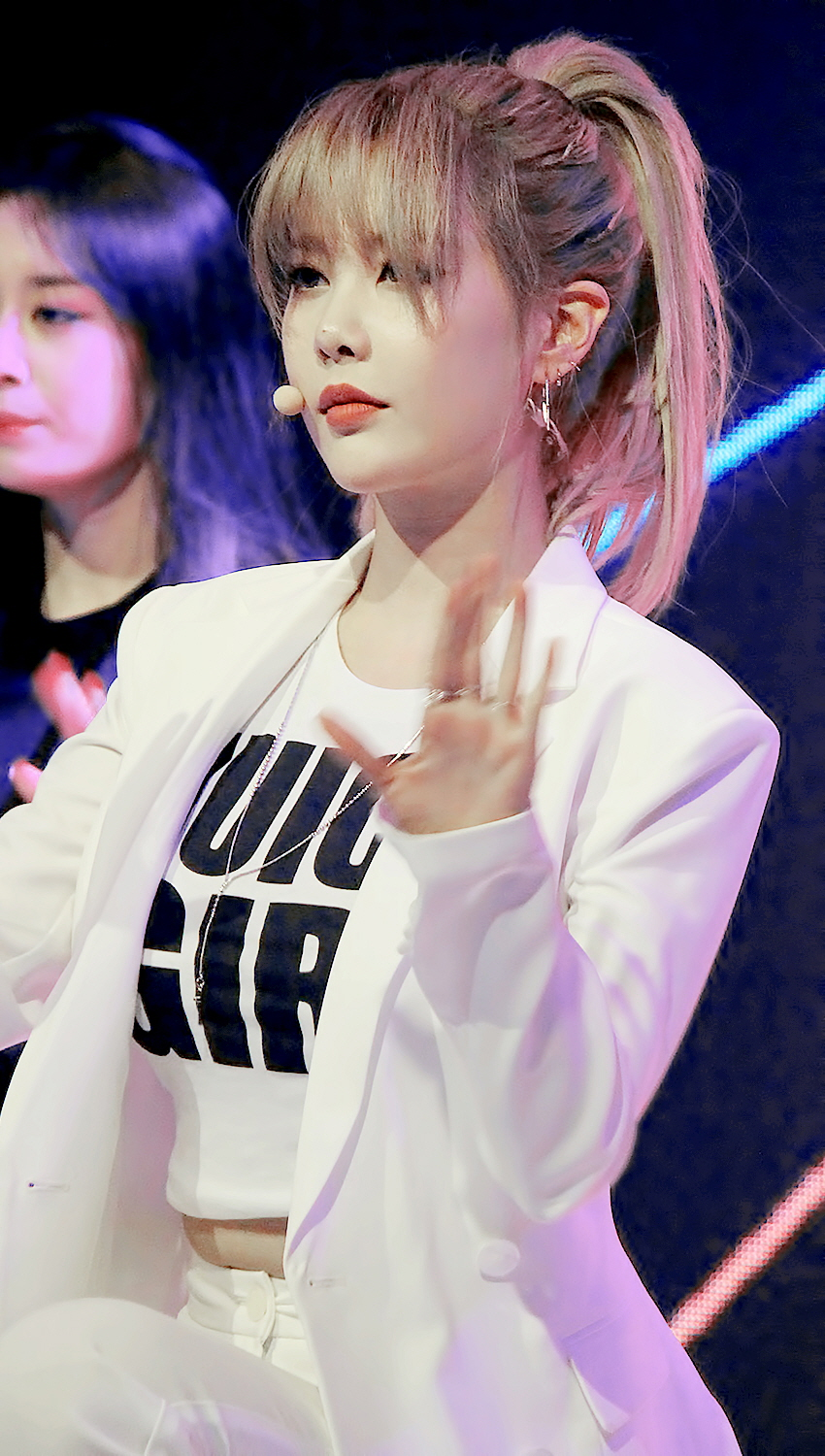
Qri

- Qri

== R ==
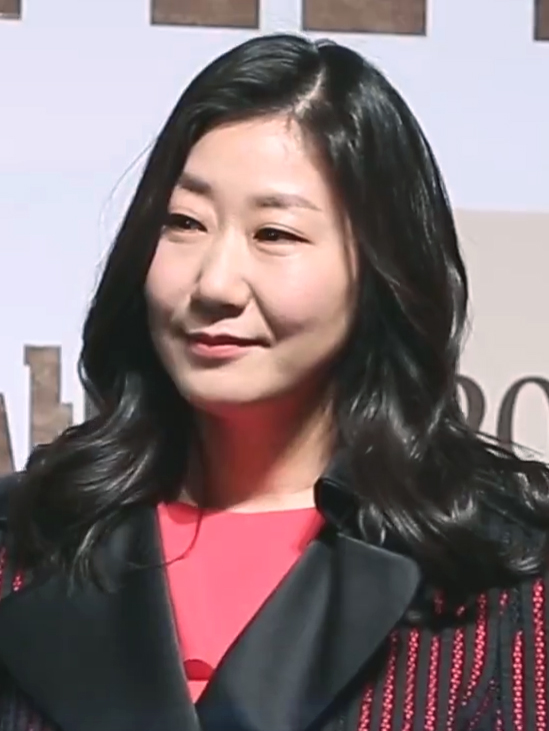
Ra Mi-ran

- Ra Mi-ran
- Raina
- Rhee Ji-yeong
- Roh Jeong-eui
- Roh Yoon-seo
- Ryu Da-in
- Ryu Han-bi
- Ryu Hwa-young
- Ryu Hye-rin
- Ryu Hye-young
- Ryu Hyo-young
- Ryu Hyun-kyung
- Ryu Se-ra
- Ryu Won

== S ==
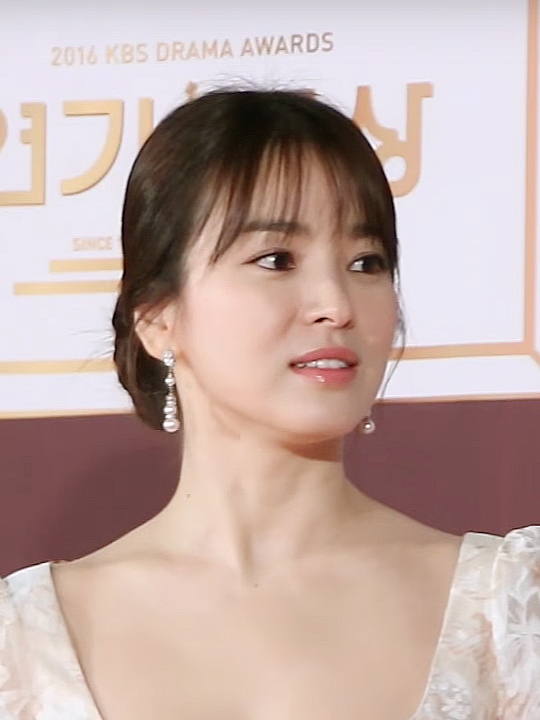
Song Hye-kyo

- Seo Cho-won
- Seo Eun-ah
- Seo Eun-soo
- Seo Hye-won
- Seo Hyo-rim
- Seo Hyun-jin
- Seo In-young
- Seo Jeong-yeon
- Seo Ji-hee
- Seo Ji-hye
- Seo Ji-hye
- Seo Ji-young
- Seo Min-jung
- Seo Seung-ah
- Seo Shin-ae
- Seo Woo
- Seo Ye-hwa
- Seo Yea-ji
- Seo Yi-sook
- Seo Yoo-jung
- Seo Young
- Seo Young-hee
- Seo Yu-ri
- Seohyun
- Seol In-ah
- Seola
- Seung Hyo-bin
- Seunghee
- Shannon
- Shim Dal-gi
- Shim Eun-ha
- Shim Eun-jin
- Shim Eun-kyung
- Shim Eun-woo
- Shim Hye-jin
- Shim So-young
- Shim Yi-young
- Shin Ae
- Shin Ae-ra
- Shin Bo-ra
- Shin Da-eun
- Shin Do-hyun
- Shin Dong-mi
- Shin Eun-jung
- Shin Eun-kyung
- Shin Eun-soo
- Shin Hye-jeong
- Shin Hye-sun
- Shin Hyun-been
- Shin Jee-won
- Shin Ji
- Shin Ji-hoon
- Shin Ji-soo
- Shin Min-a
- Shin Rin-ah
- Shin Se-hwi
- Shin Se-kyung
- Shin Seul-ki
- Shin Shin-ae
- Shin Si-ah
- Shin So-yul
- Shin Soo-yeon
- Shin Su-hyun
- Shin Ye-eun
- Shin Yeon-suh
- Shin Yi
- Shin Youngsook
- Shoo
- SinB
- So Hee-jung
- So Joo-yeon
- So Yi-hyun
- So Yoo-jin
- Solar
- Son Dam-bi
- Son Eun-seo
- Son Ji-yoon
- Son Na-eun
- Son Se-bin
- Son Seong-yoon
- Son Sook
- Son Tae-young
- Son Ye-jin
- Son Yeo-eun
- Song Do-yeong
- Song Ha-yoon
- Song Hye-kyo
- Song Ji-eun
- Song Ji-hyo
- Song Ji-woo
- Song Mi-jin
- Song Ok-sook
- Song Seon-mi
- Song Yoo-hyun
- Song Yoo-jung
- Song Yoon-ah
- Sonim
- Soo Ae
- Sori
- Suh Jung
- Sulli
- Sunday
- Sunny
- Sung Hyun-ah
- Sung Yu-ri
- Sunwoo Eun-sook
- Sunwoo Sun
- Sunwoo Yong-nyeo
- Sunye

== T ==
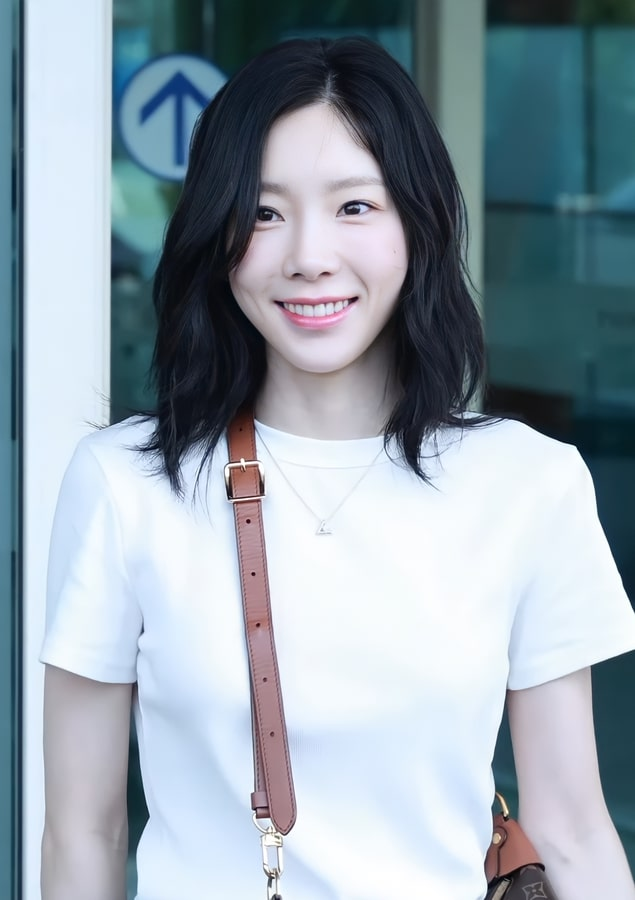
Taeyeon

- Tae Hyun-sil
- Taeyeon

== U ==
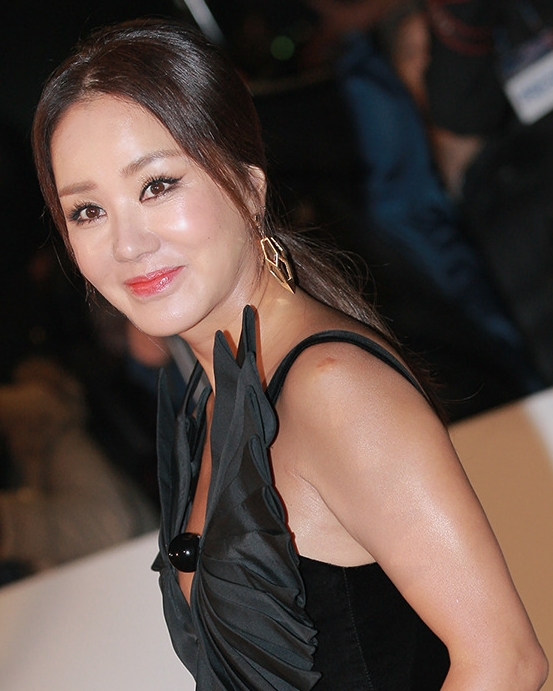
Uhm Jung-hwa

- U;Nee
- Uee
- Uhm Hyun-kyung
- Uhm Ji-won
- Uhm Jung-hwa
- Um Aing-ran

== V ==
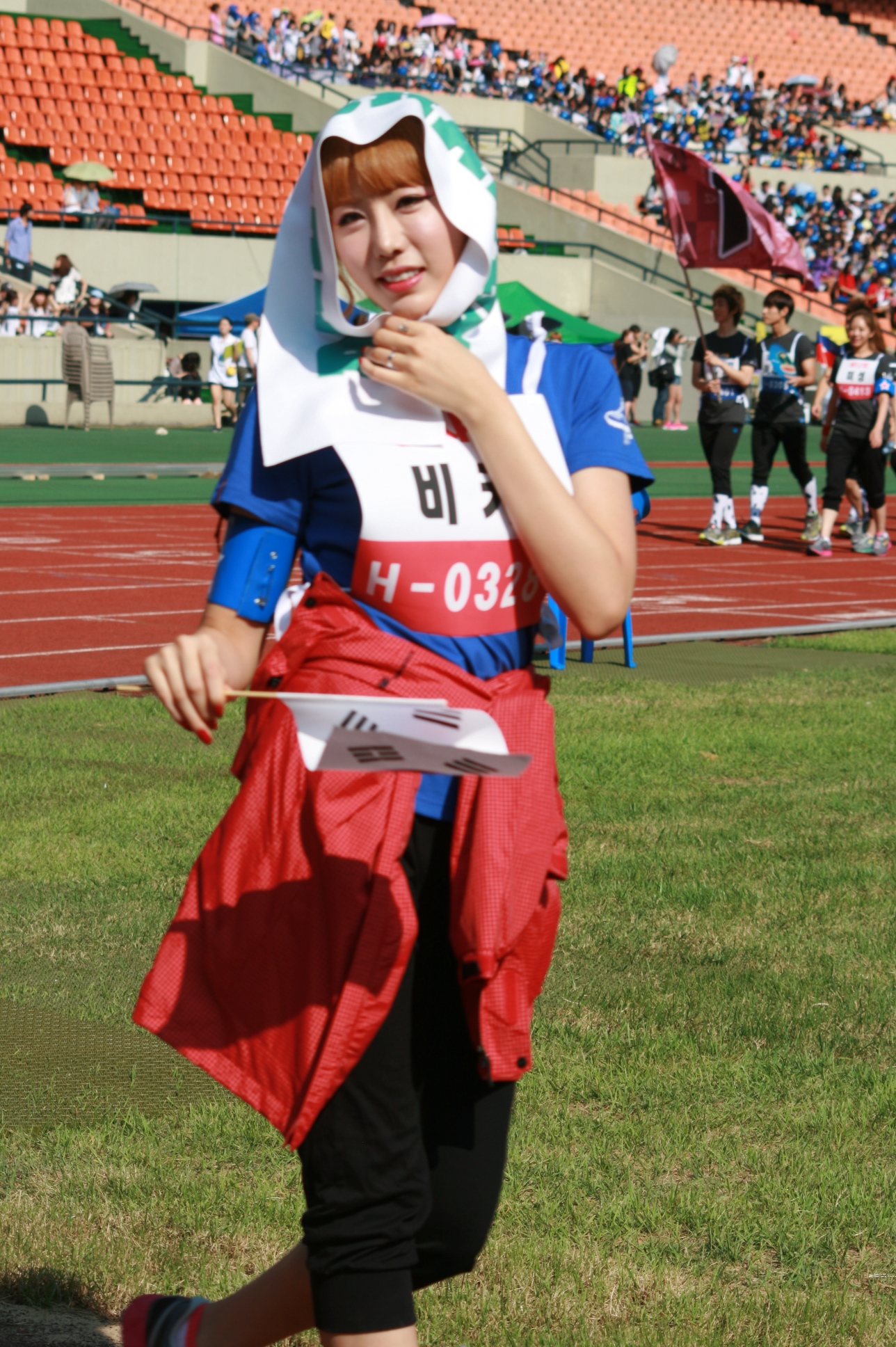
Viki

- Viki

== W ==
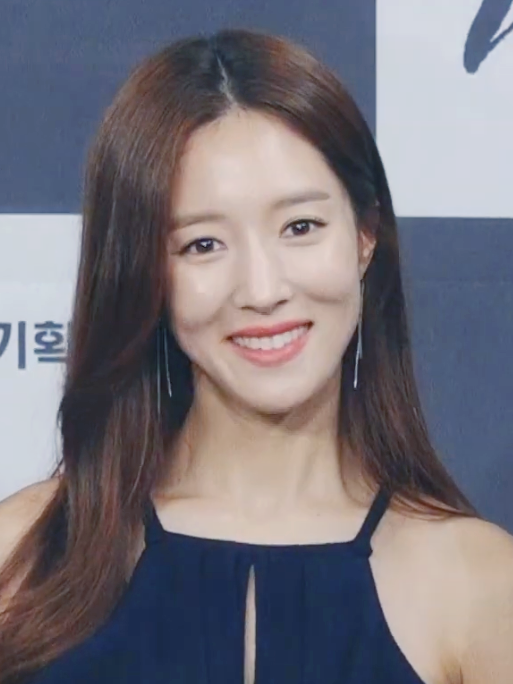
Wang Bit-na

- Wang Bit-na
- Wang Ji-hye
- Wang Ji-won
- Wendy
- Won Ji-an
- Won Jin-ah
- Won Mi-kyung
- Woo Da-vi
- Woo Hee-jin
- Woo Hye-rim
- Woo Mi-hwa
- Woo Seung-yeon

== X ==
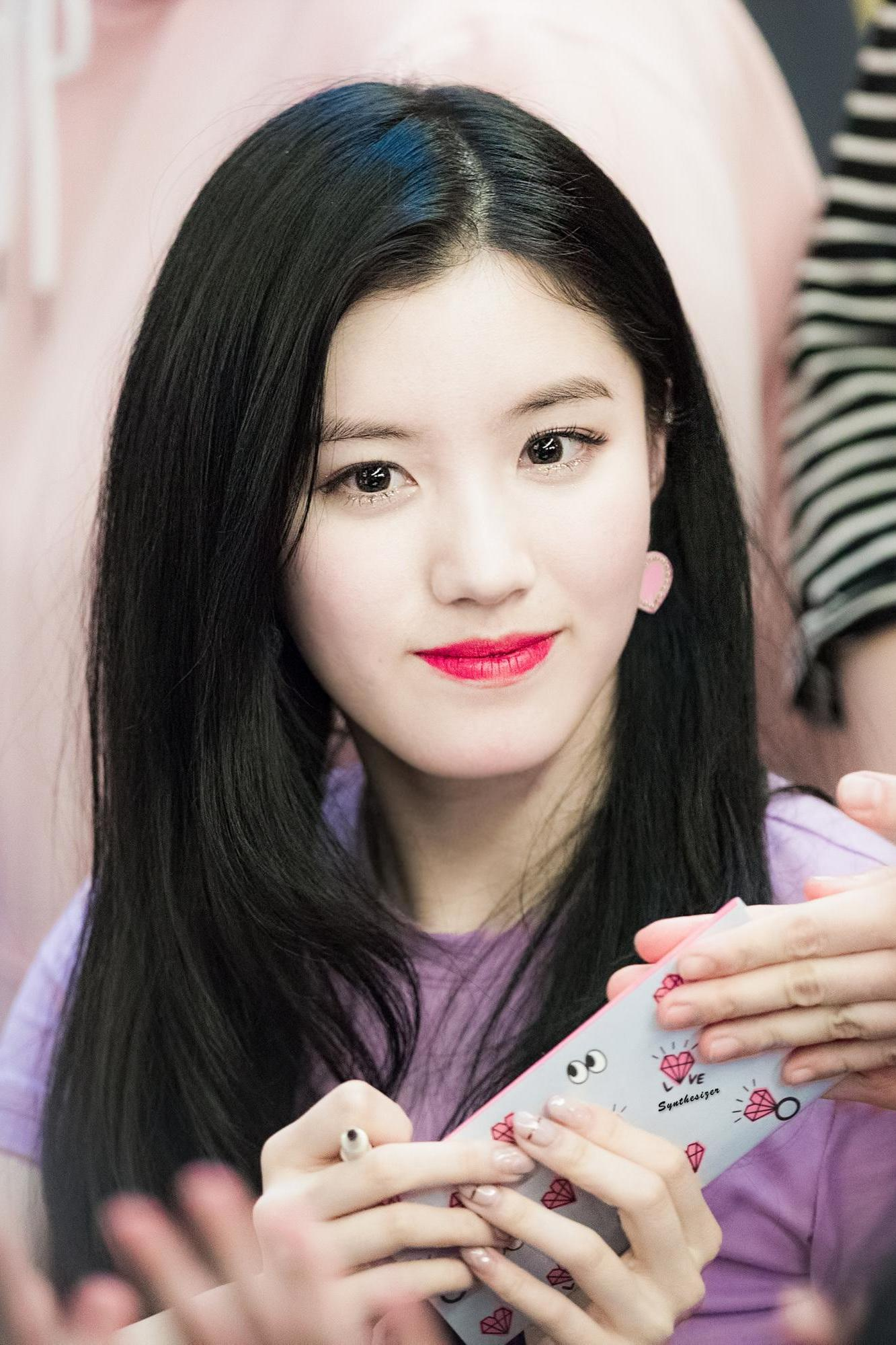
Xiyeon

- Xiyeon

== Y ==
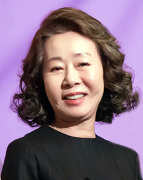
Youn Yuh-jung

- Yang Geum-seok
- Yang Hee-kyung
- Yang Hye-ji
- Yang Ji-won
- Yang Jin-sung
- Yang Jung-a
- Yang Mi-kyung
- Niki Yang
- Yang Yeon-je
- Yang Yoo-jin
- Ye Ji-won
- Ye Soo-jung
- Yebin
- Yeo Min-jeong
- Yeo Woon-kay
- Yeom Hye-ran
- Yeon Min-ji
- Yeonwoo
- Yeri
- Yerin
- Yoo Ara
- Yoo Chae-yeong
- Yoo Da-in
- Yoo Eun-mi
- Yoo Ha-na
- Yoo Hae-jung
- Yoo Ho-jeong
- Yoo Hye-ri
- Yoo In-na
- Yoo In-young
- Ji-young Yoo
- Yoo Se-rye
- Yoo So-young
- Yoo Sun
- Yoo Ye-bin
- Yoo Yeon-jung
- Yoo Yeon-mi
- YooA
- Yoon A-jung
- Yoon Bo-mi
- Yoon Bo-ra
- Yoon Bok-hee
- Yoon Bok-in
- Yoon Chae-kyung
- Yoon Chae-na
- Yoon Da-gyeong
- Yoon Eun-hye
- Yoon Hae-young
- Yoon Jeong-hee
- Yoon Ji-hye
- Yoon Ji-min
- Yoon Jin-seo
- Yoon Jin-yi
- Yoon Joo
- Yoon Joo-hee
- Yoon Jung-hee
- Yoon Mi-ra
- Yoon Mi-rim
- Yoon Sa-bong
- Yoon Sang-jeong
- Yoon Se-ah
- Yoon Seo-ah
- Yoon Seo-yeon
- Yoon Seung-ah
- Yoon So-hee
- Yoon So-yi
- Yoon Son-ha
- Usun Yoon
- Yoon Yoo-sun
- Yoon Young-ah
- Youn Yuh-jung
- Youn-a
- Tiffany Young
- Younha
- Yozoh
- Yu Ji-in
- Yum Jung-ah
- Yuna
- Yuna
- Yura

== Z ==
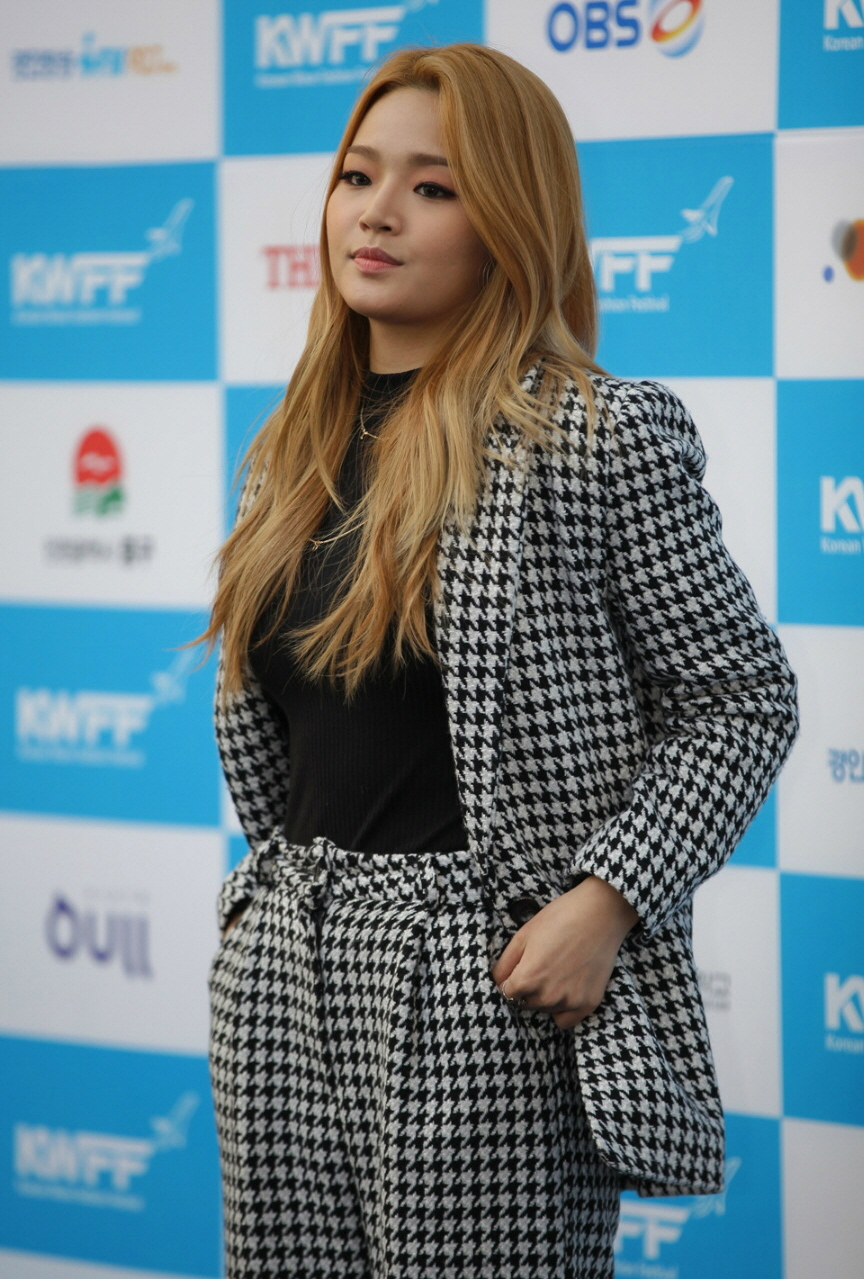
Z.Hera

- Z.Hera

== See also ==
- Korean drama
- Contemporary culture of South Korea
