= Cheo Yong =

2014 South Korean TV series

- Promotional poster
- Also known as: Ghost-Seeing Detective Cheo-yong; Detective Cheo-yong Who Sees Ghosts; Cheo Yong: The Paranormal Detective
- Hangul: 귀신 보는 형사, 처용
- RR: Gwisin boneun hyeongsa, Cheoyong
- MR: Kwisin ponŭn hyŏngsa, Ch'ŏyong
- Genre: Police procedural Horror; Mystery; Thriller; Action
- Written by: Hong Seung-hyun
- Directed by: Kang Chul-woo
- Starring: Oh Ji-ho; Oh Ji-eun; Jun Hyo-seong; Ha Yeon-joo
- Country of origin: South Korea
- Original language: Korean
- No. of seasons: 2
- No. of episodes: 20

Production
- Production location: Korea
- Production companies: CMG Chorok Stars (now Star Road Entertainment); Darin Media

Original release
- Network: OCN
- Release: February 9, 2014 – October 18, 2015

Cheo Yong (Korean: 귀신 보는 형사, 처용; lit. Ghost-Seeing Detective Cheo-yong) is a South Korean television series starring Oh Ji-ho, Oh Ji-eun and Jun Hyo-seong. The first season aired on cable channel OCN from February 9 to April 6, 2014, for 10 episodes.

The second season aired from August 23, 2015, to October 18, 2015, with Oh Ji-ho and Jun Hyo-seong reprising their roles, and with Ha Yeon-joo playing the protagonist's new partner.

== Series overview ==
Season	Episodes	Originally released		Time slot
Season	Episodes	First released	Last released	Time slot
1	10	February 9, 2014	April 6, 2014	Sundays at 23:00 (KST)
2	10	August 23, 2015	October 18, 2015	Sundays at 23:00 (KST)

== Plot ==
Detective Yoon Cheo-yong was born with the supernatural ability to see, hear and touch ghosts. He solves mysterious, unsolved cases along with tough and passionate colleague Ha Sun-woo, and Han Na-young, the ghost of a high school girl.

== Cast ==
=== Main characters ===
- Oh Ji-ho as Yoon Cheo-yong

A detective who loses his family and partner in a tragic incident. He goes from elite detective in the violent crimes unit to a lowly district cop, completely disengaged from life for seven years. Born with the supernatural ability to see, hear, and touch ghosts, one day Cheo-yong starts talking back to the schoolgirl ghost who keeps haunting him and strangely enough, communicating with the undead is what brings him back to the land of the living. He starts to work mysterious cases with his partner Ha Sun-woo, with the added help of "dead signs" that the victims' souls leave behind.

- Oh Ji-eun as Ha Sun-woo (season 1)

A detective in the regional investigation unit who is famous for her tenacity. Her keen sense of observation makes her particularly good at spotting a suspect's weak point, which also comes in handy for her specialty — crime scene reconstructions. Sun-woo is so dogged in her pursuit of closing cases that other cops find her hard to work with.

- Jun Hyo-seong as Han Na-young

The departed spirit of an ebullient high school girl who roams around a local police investigation unit aiding its inquiries.

- Ha Yeon-joo as Jung Ha-yoon (season 2)

=== Supporting characters ===
- Joo Jin-mo as Kang Ki-young (season 2)
- Han Sung-yun as Kim Yeon-jin
- Kim Jin-yi as Dong-mi's friend
- Yoo Min-kyu as Park Min-jae (season 1)
- Choi Deok-moon as Yang Soo-hyuk
- Seo Cho-won as Supporting
- Oh Woo-jin as Student (season 2)
- Kim Kwon as Han Tae-kyung (season 2)
- Kim Hyun-joon as Oh Chang-won (season 2)
- Im Kang-sung as Jo Nam-ho (season 2)
- Yoo Seung-mok as Byun Gook-jin
- Yeon Je-wook as Lee Jong-hyun

=== Guest appearances ===
- Baek Sung-hyun as Jang Dae-seok (ep. 1-2, 9-10)
- Nash Ang as Ikbal (ep. 5)
- Kang Ki-hwa as Min Joo-yeon (ep. 1)
- Kim Young-jae as Doctor (ep. 1, 2)
- Jeon Ji-ahn as Kim Hye-sun (ep. 2)
- Oh Hee-joon as Ghost hunter cameraman (ep. 3)
- Moon Se-yoon as Ghost hunter cameraman (ep. 3)
- Jung So-young as Choi Yeon-seo / Kang Mi-soo (ep. 3)
- Kwon Min as Song Byung-chang (ep. 3)
- Jang Eun-ah as Oh Hyun-jin (ep. 3)
- Jo Jae-wan as Kim Jae-kwang (ep. 3)
- Woo Jin-hee as Kang Je-yi (ep. 4)
- Jo Deok-hyun as Vice principal (ep. 4)
- Kim Na-hyun as Park Seul-gi (ep. 4)
- Ji Su-min as Student (ep. 4)
- Jeon Chang-gul as Fisherman (ep. 6)
- Lee Sang-in as Lee Dong-mi (ep. 6)
- Kang Sung-pil as Ghost (ep. 6)
- Kang Sung-min as Choi Yong-joon (ep. 6)
- Lee Jae-hee as young Yong-joon (ep. 6)
- Kim Hee-ryung as Ahn Gil-ja, Yong-joon's mother (ep. 6)
- Yeom Hye-ah as Jang Hye-ji (ep. 7)
- Jo Yong-jin as Lee Byung-hoon (ep. 7)
- Yang Eun-yong as Park Myung-hee (ep. 7)
- Kang Suk-jung as Im Dong-chul (ep. 7)
- Seo Ho-chul as Park Yoo-seok (ep. 7)
- Heo Jung-kyu as Uhm Jin-won (ep. 7)
- Park Woo-chun as Jo Byung-woo (ep. 8)
- Kim Byung-chul as offender (ep. 9)
- Song Tae-yoon as Kang Jae-sup (ep. 9, season 2)
- Oh Min-suk as Han Tae (ep. 10)
- Park Jung-hak as Moon Doo-hyun (ep. 10)
- Kim Dong-wook as Lee Cheol-gyu (season 2, ep. 1-2)
- Yeon Jung-hoon as police officer (season 2, ep. 5)
- Lee Si-a as Han Ji-soo (season 2, ep. 6)
- Lee Bit-na as Lee Ji-yeon (season 2, ep. 8)

== Title origins ==
The name "Cheo Yong" is inspired by a character in a folktale from the Silla dynasty; Cheo-yong discovers that his wife has committed infidelity with the god of smallpox, and he sings and dances until the god kneels before him in apology. Since then, people have attached an image of Cheo-yong to their gates to dispel evil spirits and invite auspicious energies.

== Original soundtrack ==
=== Season 1 ===
No.	Title	Artist	Length
1.	"잃어버린 것들" (Lost Things)	Horan	3:41
2.	"Secret Marriage"	W&JAS	4:15

=== Season 2 ===
No.	Title	Artist	Length
1.	"멀어지지 말아요"	Young Ji (Bubble Sisters)
2.	"Memories" (feat. 안현정)	DinDin
3.	"꿈속을 헤매다"	Fromm
4.	"처용" (Stay)	Yoon Hyung Ryul
5.	"I Believe"	zion (시온)
