= Rosebud (2019 film) =

2019 film by Jo Seok-hyun

- Theatrical release poster
- Hangul: 그대 이름은 장미
- RR: Geudae ireumeun Jangmi
- MR: Kŭdae irŭmŭn Changmi
- Directed by: Jo Seok-hyun
- Written by: Hong Eun-mi
- Starring: Yoo Ho-jeong; Park Sung-woong; Oh Jung-se; Chae Soo-bin; Ha Yeon-soo; Lee Won-keun; Choi Woo-shik
- Production company: MCMC
- Distributed by: Little Big Pictures
- Release date: January 16, 2019
- Running time: 125 minutes
- Country: South Korea
- Language: Korean
- Box office: US$623,431

Rosebud (Korean: 그대 이름은 장미) is a 2019 South Korean comedy film directed by Jo Seok-hyun. It was released on January 16, 2019.

== Plot ==
Set between the late 1970s and present day, the story follows a woman named Hong Jang-mi who dreams of becoming a singer.

== Cast ==
- Yoo Ho-jeong as Hong Jang-mi
  - Ha Yeon-soo as Hong Jang-mi (young)
- Park Sung-woong as Myung-hwan
  - Lee Won-keun as Myung-hwan (young)
- Oh Jung-se as Soon-cheol
  - Choi Woo-shik as Soon-cheol (young)
- Chae Soo-bin as Hyun-ah
- Park Joon-myun as Kang-ja
  - Jo Soo-yeon as Kang-ja (young)
- Yoon Bok-in as Mi-ran
  - Oh Ha-nee as Mi-ran (young)
- Lee Jun-hyeok as Chief Oh
- Hwang Seok-jeong as Han Myung-hee
- Kim Jung-hyun as Woo-seong
- Ri Min as Factory manager
- Woo Jung-kook as Kan-ja's husband
- Oh Woo-jin as Woo Sung's friend
- Jang Tae-sung as Car accident man (cameo)
- Kim Gi-deok as Radio DJ voice (cameo)
- Kim Min-jong as Radio DJ voice (cameo)
- Lee Ji-ae as Broadcaster (special appearance)

== Production ==
Principal photography began on January 29, 2016, and wrapped on April 30, 2016.
