= Second 20s =

2015 South Korean TV series

- Also known as: Second 20's; Twenty Again; Second Time Twenty Years Old; Second Twenty
- Genre: Romance; Comedy
- Written by: So Hyun-kyung
- Directed by: Kim Hyung-shik
- Starring: Choi Ji-woo; Lee Sang-yoon; Choi Won-young; Son Na-eun; Kim Min-jae
- Composer: Kim Hyun-jong
- Country of origin: South Korea
- Original language: Korean
- No. of episodes: 16

Production
- Executive producers: Lee Jin-seok; Bae Yong-byung
- Producers: Lee Min-jin; Lee Ye-rim; Choi Jin-hee; Park Ji-young
- Cinematography: Kim Kyung-chul; Ahn Jae-hyun
- Editors: Kim Yoo-mi; Kim Soo-hyun
- Running time: 60 minutes
- Production companies: JS Pictures; AStory

Original release
- Network: tvN
- Release: August 28 – October 17, 2015

Second 20s (Korean: 두번째 스무살; RR: Dubeonjjae seumusal; lit. 'Twenty Years Old for the Second Time') is a 2015 South Korean television series starring Choi Ji-woo, Lee Sang-yoon, Choi Won-young, Son Na-eun and Kim Min-jae. It aired on tvN from August 28 to October 17, 2015, on Fridays and Saturdays at 20:30 (KST) for 16 episodes.

== Synopsis ==
Ha No-ra once dreamed of becoming a dancer, but she unexpectedly became pregnant at age 19 and had to quit school and get married. For the next two decades, her life revolved around being a housewife and mother. Now 38 years old and on the brink of divorce, No-ra is diagnosed with terminal pancreatic cancer and given a six-month prognosis. So she decides to go back to school and experience college life for the first time. Among the incoming freshmen are her own 20-year-old son Kim Min-soo and his girlfriend Oh Hye-mi, who are horrified to have No-ra as their classmate. Unbeknownst to No-ra, her intellectual snob husband Kim Woo-chul recently accepted a job teaching psychology at the same university, and her prickly theater arts professor turns out to be Cha Hyun-seok, who had a crush on No-ra in high school.

== Cast ==
- Choi Ji-woo as Ha No-ra
  - Ha Seung-ri as young No-ra
- Lee Sang-yoon as Cha Hyun-seok
  - Kim Hee-chan as young Hyun-seok
- Choi Won-young as Kim Woo-chul
  - Kang Tae-oh as young Woo-chul
- Son Na-eun as Oh Hye-mi
- Kim Min-jae as Kim Min-soo
- Han Sung-yun as Hyun-Jung
- Jung Soo-young as Ra Yoon-young
  - Im Ji-hyun as young Yoon-young
- Noh Young-hak as Na Soon-nam
- Woo Ki-hoon as Woo-hun
- Choi Yoon-so as Shin Sang-ye
- Ji Ha-yoon as Min-ae
- Jin Ki-joo as Park Seung-hyun
- Kim Kang-hyun as Seo Dong-chul
- Ban Hyo-jung as Seo Woon-hae, No-ra's grandmother (cameo)

== Original soundtrack ==
Twenty Again OST

Soundtrack album by Various artists
- Recorded: 2015
- Genre: Soundtrack
- Languages: Korean; English
- Label: CJ E&M

=== Part 1 ===
Released on August 29, 2015
No.	Title	Artist	Length
1.	"Wrongful Encounter" (잘못된 만남)	Honey G	3:57
2.	"Wrongful Encounter" (Inst.)		3:57
Total length:			7:34

=== Part 2 ===
Released on September 4, 2015
No.	Title	Artist	Length
1.	"Why Don't Love Me?" (날 사랑하지 않는다)	Roy Kim	4:04
2.	"Why Don't Love Me?" (Inst.)		4:04
Total length:			8:08

=== Part 3 ===
Released on September 11, 2015
No.	Title	Artist	Length
1.	"Oh You, Yeah You" (오유야유)	Yoo Sung-eun	3:03
2.	"Oh You, Yeah You" (Inst.)		3:03
Total length:			6:06

=== Part 4 ===
Released on September 18, 2015
No.	Title	Artist	Length
1.	"Beautiful Days" (아름다운 시절)	Byul	3:49
2.	"Beautiful Days" (Inst.)		3:49
Total length:			7:38

=== Part 5 ===
Released on September 18, 2015
No.	Title	Artist	Length
1.	"Good Day" (좋은날)	Jung Joon-il	4:33
2.	"Good Day" (Inst.)		4:33
Total length:			9:06

=== Part 6 ===
Released on October 2, 2015
No.	Title	Artist	Length
1.	"Star" (별)	Kim Min-jae and Solar (of Mamamoo)	3:40
2.	"Star" (Inst.)		3:40
Total length:			7:20

=== Part 7 ===
Released on October 9, 2015
No.	Title	Artist	Length
1.	"Cuckoo"	Jannabi	3:08
2.	"Cuckoo" (Inst.)		3:08
Total length:			7:16

== Ratings ==
In this table, the blue numbers represent the lowest ratings and the red numbers represent the highest ratings.

Ep.	Original broadcast date	Average audience share	
Ep.	Original broadcast date	AGB Nielsen	TNmS
Ep.	Original broadcast date	Nationwide	Nationwide
1	August 28, 2015	3.57%	4.4%
2	August 29, 2015	3.16%	3.6%
3	September 4, 2015	4.66%	4.4%
4	September 5, 2015	4.62%	5.2%
5	September 11, 2015	4.38%	5.1%
6	September 12, 2015	4.90%	5.6%
7	September 18, 2015	4.96%	4.9%
8	September 19, 2015	6.27%	6.0%
9	September 25, 2015	5.91%	5.8%
10	September 26, 2015	5.53%	5.2%
11	October 2, 2015	5.09%	5.4%
12	October 3, 2015	6.97%	5.9%
13	October 9, 2015	6.08%	6.9%
14	October 10, 2015	7.06%	6.3%
15	October 16, 2015	6.50%	6.1%
16	October 17, 2015	7.0%	7.2%
Average		5.42%	5.5%

- This drama airs on cable channel/pay TV which has a relatively small audience compared to free-to-air TV/public broadcasters (KBS, SBS, MBC and EBS).

== Awards and nominations ==
Year	Award	Category	Recipient	Result
2016	tvN10 Awards	Best Actress	Choi Ji-woo	Nominated
2016	tvN10 Awards	Two Star Award	Choi Ji-woo	Nominated
