= Jang Tae-sung =

South Korean actor

- Born: September 27, 1980 (age 46); Busan, South Korea
- Education: Dongguk University - Theater and Film
- Occupation: Actor
- Years active: 2000–present
- Agent: Will Entertainment
- Spouse: Unknown (m. 2013)

Korean name
- Hangul: 장태성
- Hanja: 張泰成
- RR: Jang Taeseong
- MR: Chang T'aesŏng

Jang Tae-sung (born September 27, 1980) is a South Korean actor. He has mostly played supporting roles.

== Filmography ==
=== Film ===
Year	Title	Role
2001	Kick the Moon	Jang Hak-doo
2002	Jail Breakers	Cheol-gu
2004	A Wacky Switch	Blackmailer 2
2005	Tarzan Park Heung-suk	Lee Bok-dong
2007	Magang Hotel	Jang Yong-sang
2007	Pornmaking for Dummies	Byung-gyu
2012	Code Name: Jackal	Detective Seok
2013	Tough as Iron	Lee Byeong-hee
2013	Days of Wrath	Doo-joon
2019	Rosebud	Car accident man (cameo)

=== Television series ===
Year	Title	Role	Network
2000	School 3	Lee Jae-min	KBS2
2001	Orient Theatre	Kim Du-han	KBS2
2002	Sunshine Hunting	Kim Jae-hyuk	KBS2
2002	Orange	Jang Tae-sung	SBS
2004	April Kiss	Noh Kong-tak	KBS2
2005	Sisters of the Sea	Jung In-chul	MBC
2006	Goodbye Solo	Moodugi	KBS2
2007	Que Sera Sera		MBC
2007	Capital Scandal	Chu Geun-deok	KBS2
2007	Drama City: "The Story of Martial Arts and Jokgu"	Yang Kwang-tae	KBS2
2008	The Kingdom of the Winds	Maro	KBS2
2009	The Grudge Island	Kang-man	KBS2
2009	Hot Blood	Yong-gu	KBS2
2010	Becoming a Billionaire	Ohsung Hotel bellman	KBS2
2010	Mom Is Pretty Too	Oh Jung-chul	KBS2
2012	God of War	Won-bal	MBC
2012	Jeon Woo-chi	Bok-mal	KBS2
2013	Dream of the Emperor	Buyeo Pung	KBS1
2013	Love in Her Bag	Eun Kyung-ho	JTBC
2014	Jeong Do-jeon	Hwang Cheon-bok	KBS1
2014	Big Man	Yang Dae-sub	KBS2
2014	Single-minded Dandelion	Jang Young-man	KBS2
2015	The Jingbirok: A Memoir of Imjin War	Wanli Emperor	KBS1
2015	Beating Again		JTBC
