= Lee Kang-min (actor) =

South Korean actor

- Born: December 28, 1990 (age 35); South Korea
- Other name: Lee Sung-woo
- Occupation: Actor
- Years active: 2015–present
- Agent: CLN Company

Korean name
- Hangul: 이강민
- RR: I Gangmin
- MR: I Kangmin

Lee Kang-min (born December 28, 1990) is a South Korean actor. He is perhaps best known for his roles in the television series Temperature of Love (2017) and My Strange Hero (2018–2019). He is sometimes known under the name Lee Sung-woo.

== Filmography ==
=== Television series ===
Year	Title	Role	Notes	Ref.
2015	Who Are You: School 2015	Han Yi-an's swimming senior		
2016	Puck!	Choi Hwan-seo	Television special	
2016	Sweet Stranger and Me	Park Joon		
2017	Temperature of Love	Oh Kyung-soo		
2018–2019	My Strange Hero	Yoon Seung-woo		
2019	Different Dreams	Yoon Bong-gil	Episodes 28–30	
2019	VIP	Han Dong-il	Episode 15	
2024	Knight Flower	Yong-deok	Episodes 5–6	
2024	Frankly Speaking	Park Sung-joon	Episodes 5–8	

=== Web series ===
Year	Title	Role	Notes	Ref.
2021	How to Be Thirty	Kim Byung-ho		
2024	Queen Woo	Dal Ga		
