= Park Ah-sung =

South Korean actor

- Born: Park Ah-sung; August 24, 1994 (age 32); South Korea
- Other names: Park A-sung, Park Ah-seong, Bak A-sung
- Occupations: Actor, Model
- Years active: 2013–present
- Agent: Hyunhyeon Entertainment

Park Ah-sung is a South Korean actor. He is best known for his supporting roles in dramas. He also appeared in series such as Who Are You: School 2015, 4 Legendary Witches and Reply 1988.

== Filmography ==
=== Television ===
Year	Title	Role	Ref.
2013	Basketball	Poor Villager	
2014	4 Legendary Witches	Mr. Kim	
2015	Who Are You: School 2015	Ah-sung	
2015	Mom	Student	
2015	Reply 1988	Student	
2015	Sweet, Savage Family	Bully	
2018	Are You Human?	Anchor	
2020	The Uncanny Counter	Ha-jeong	
2021	Youth of May	Ah-seong	
2022	Love All Play	Sneaker seller	
2024	Begins ≠ Youth	Kim Do-hyun	

=== Film ===
Year	Title	Role	Language	Ref.
2015	Makgeolli Girls	Seok Man	Korean	
2016	Time Renegades	Science lab male student	Korean	
2018	Bully	Choi Kyung Joon	Korean	
