= School (South Korean TV series) =

South Korean KBS franchise television series

- Hangul: 학교
- Hanja: 學校
- RR: Hakgyo
- MR: Hakkyo
- Created by: KBS Drama Production
- Written by: Kim Ji-woo; Kim Yoon-young; Jin Soo-wan; Lee Hyang-hee; Hong Ja-ram; Hong Jin-ah; Jo Jung-sun; Lee Hyun-joo; Go Jung-won; Kim Hyun-jung; Kim Min-jung; Lim Soo-mi
- Directed by: Lee Min-hong; Go Young-tak; Han Joon-seo; Lee Kang-hyun; Lee Jae-sang; Jung Hae-ryong; Hwang Eui-kyung; Lee Eung-bok; Baek Sang-hoon; Kim Sung-yoon; Park Jin-suk
- Starring: List of School series cast members
- Country of origin: South Korea
- Original language: Korean
- No. of seasons: 8
- No. of episodes: 220 + 1 special

Production
- Executive producers: Park Chan-hong; Uhm Ki-baek; Hwang Eui-kyung; Jung Sung-hyo; Hwang Chang-woo; Jo Hye-rin; Lee Gun-joon
- Producers: Lee Gun-joon; Yoon Jae-hyuk
- Production location: South Korea
- Cinematography: Wi Chang-seok; Kwon Hyuk-gyun; Oh Jae-sang; Lee Min-woong
- Editors: Jung Hyun-kyung; Choi Joong-won
- Running time: 60 minutes
- Production companies: KBS Drama Production (School 1 to School 4); Content K (School 2013); Culture Industry Company School LLC. (School 2013); FNC Entertainment (Who Are You: School 2015); School 2017 SPC (School 2017); Production H (School 2017); RaemongRaein (School 2021); Kings Land (School 2021)

Original release
- Network: KBS1; KBS2
- Release: February 22, 1999 – present

School (Korean: 학교) is a South Korean anthology series created by the KBS Drama Production Group for KBS2. The first season premiered in 1999, and the series lasted for four straight years (until 2002). After a ten-year hiatus, the franchise rebooted with a new season in 2012 titled as School 2013. Since then, three other series – Who Are You: School 2015, School 2017 and School 2021 – were launched.

== Format ==
School tells about the struggles that students go through in course of their formative years in schools. They focuses on portraying realistic issues that South Korea's youth faces, such as the corrupt education system, teen suicide, corporal punishment, academy and tutoring culture, career prospects and bullying.

The series has been well-known for launching the careers of rookie actors.

== Series overview ==
Title	Episodes	Broadcast dates	Time slot
School 1	16	February 22 to April 13, 1999	Monday–Tuesday at 22:00 (KST)
School 2	42	May 8, 1999 to February 7, 2000	Sunday at 19:10 (KST)
School 3	48	March 5, 2000 to April 11, 2001	Sunday at 19:10 (KST)
School 4	48	April 8, 2001 to March 31, 2002	Sunday at 19:10 (KST)
School 2013	16	December 3, 2012 to January 28, 2013	Monday–Tuesday at 22:00 (KST)
Who Are You: School 2015	16	April 27 to June 16, 2015	Monday–Tuesday at 22:00 (KST)
School 2017	16	July 16 to September 7, 2017	Monday–Tuesday at 22:00 (KST)
School 2021	16	November 24, 2021 to January 13, 2022	Wednesday–Thursday at 21:30 (KST)

== List of series ==
The first three series focus on the problems teenagers face in school, including study, first love, family, and how they struggle to overcome those. School 4 tells about the lives of people in Sewon Arts High School.

=== School 2013 ===
Seungri High School ranks as one of the worst of the 178 high schools in Seoul based on academic scores. Seungri High School is now busy preparing presentations for its new students. Class 2 is at the bottom of grade 2 at Seungri High School. Go Nam-soon (Lee Jong-suk) is elected class president for grade 2, thanks to the support of Oh Jung-ho (Kwak Jung-wook), who is a member of the school gang. Kang Se-chan (Choi Daniel) is the top Korean language teacher at a famous institute in Gangnam. In order to improve the student's scores at Seungri High School, the school hires Se-chan. Now, Jung In-jae (Jang Na-ra) and Kang Sae-chan (Choi Daniel) becomes the homeroom teachers of the students whose philosophies are apparently at odds. Together, they manage Victory High's toughest class; facing bullies, academic underachievers, and demanding parents, as they help the students overcome their problems.

=== School 2015 ===
Sekang High School is the most prestigious private high school in Seoul's Gangnam District, and Go Eun-byul (Kim So-hyun) is the most popular girl there. Meanwhile, her identical twin sister Lee Eun-bi is living in an orphanage and is being bullied at school. When Eun-byul mysteriously disappears one day, Eun-bi loses her memories and is mistaken as being Eun-byul, and starts living her life as Eun-byul.

=== School 2017 ===
The series tells about lives of 18-year-old high school students who are valued according to their ranking at Geumdo High School. Despite their frustrations, they find out how to make their own way in this world that seems to be a stagnant cycle of school and home.

The central protagonist, Ra Eun-ho (Kim Se-jeong), is a cheerful and kind-hearted 18-year-old high school girl who dreams of being a webtoon artist. However, she is caught up in the search for a mysterious troublemaker in the school known as 'Student X'. When Eun-ho is accused of being Student X and faces expulsion, she reveals her dream of attending a university of arts.

=== School 2021 ===
The series tells the story of youngsters just turned 18 who choose a path rather than an entrance examination, helping each other overcome the barriers that come up while taking a less chosen path. They learn valuable lessons about life, love, and friendship.

== See also ==
- Reply, another long-running series from TVN (three seasons)
- Ugly Miss Young-ae, another long-running series also from TVN (17 seasons)
