= Oh Woo-jin =

South Korean actor

- Born: Oh Woo-jin; 26 March 1991 (age 35); South Korea
- Education: Yongin University, Department of Musical Drama
- Occupations: Actor; model
- Years active: 2015–present
- Agent: Sumano Entertainment
- Known for: Who Are You: School 2015; Your Name is Rose; Cheo Yong 2

Korean name
- Hangul: 오우진
- RR: O Ujin
- MR: O Ujin

Oh Woo-jin (Korean: 오우진; born March 26, 1991) is a South Korean actor and model. He is known for his supporting roles. He has played a supporting role in the school series Who Are You: School 2015 as Woo-jin and also appeared in the movie Your Name is Rose.

== Filmography ==
=== Films ===
Year	Title	Role	Language	Ref.
2019	Your Name is Rose	Woo-sung's friend	Korean	
2020	Bully Bad Guys	Yo Si-da	Korean	
2020	The Techniques of Fighting 2	Ho-seok	Korean	

=== Television ===
Year	Title	Role	Ref.
2015	Who Are You: School 2015	Woo-jin	
2015	Cheo Yong 2	Student	
