= Who Are You: School 2015 =

2015 South Korean TV series

- Promotional poster
- Hangul: 후아유: 학교 2015
- Hanja: 후아유: 學校 2015
- RR: Huayu: hakgyo 2015
- MR: Huayu: hakkyo 2015
- Genre: Teen; Mystery
- Written by: Kim Min-jung; Im Ye-jin
- Directed by: Baek Sang-hoon; Kim Seong-yoon
- Starring: Kim So-hyun; Nam Joo-hyuk; Yook Sung-jae
- Composer: Gaemi
- Country of origin: South Korea
- Original language: Korean
- No. of episodes: 16

Production
- Executive producers: Jung Sung-hyo; Han Sung-ho
- Producers: Lee Gun-joon; Yoon Jae-hyuk
- Cinematography: Oh Jae-sang; Lee Min-woong
- Editor: Choi Joong-won
- Running time: 60 minutes
- Production companies: School 2015 Culture Industry Co., Ltd. FNC Entertainment

Original release
- Network: KBS2
- Release: April 27 – June 16, 2015

Related
- Who Are You (GMM 25/Line TV, 2020)

Who Are You: School 2015 (Korean: 후아유: 학교 2015; RR: Huayu: hakgyo 2015; also known in Japan as Love Generation) is a 2015 South Korean television series starring Kim So-hyun, Nam Joo-hyuk, and Yook Sung-jae. It aired on KBS2 from April 27 to June 16, 2015, every Monday and Tuesday at 21:55 (KST) for 16 episodes. It is the sixth installment of KBS's School series which premiered in 1999.

The final episode received a 8.2% nationwide ratings. It was well-received and popular overseas, it established a strong following among young viewers worldwide which led to increased recognition for its cast.

== Synopsis ==
Go Eun-byul and Lee Eun-bi (both played by Kim So-hyun) are identical twins, separated after one is adopted at the age of 5. Eun-bi lives at the Love House, an orphanage in Tongyeong, South Gyeongsang Province, where the younger residents look up to her as a mother figure. However, she hides the fact that she is bullied at school by a gang of mean girls led by Kang So-young (Cho Soo-hyang), while teachers turn a blind eye.

On the other hand, Go Eun-byul is studying at Sekang High School, the most prestigious private high school in Seoul's Gangnam District. Eun-byul's best friend is Han Yi-an (Nam Joo-hyuk), the school's star swimmer and is in love with her since childhood.

However, only Eun-byul is aware of the other's existence. Unlike the cheerful Eun-bi, Eun-byul is prickly and secretive.

== Cast ==
=== Main ===
- Kim So-hyun as Lee Eun-bi / Go Eun-byul
  - Kang Ji-woo as young Lee Eun-bi / Go Eun-byul

Go Eun-byul and Lee Eun-bi are identical twins. Lee Eun-bi lives in an orphanage whereas Go Eun-byul, Eun-bi's twin sister lives with a woman who adopted her. Due to bullying, Eun-bi decided to end her life but she was saved by her twin sister. Eun-bi had amnesia after that. When Eun-byul's adoptive mother mistook Eun-bi as Eun-byul, she starts to assume the identity of her twin sister. Eun-byul leaves in the end to pursue her dreams whilst Eun-bi remains in the school.

- Yook Sung-jae as Gong Tae-kwang
  - Kim Ye-jun as young Gong Tae-kwang

Described by his father as an idiotic and problematic child, Gong Tae-kwang is widely known as a troublemaker in school. His father is the director of Sekang High School and his mother is a famous actress, but his classmates don't know about this. He is portrayed as a happy-go-lucky person who just wanted to cause trouble, but behind his smile, he was actually a struggling child with a painful life. He suffered a lot but everything changed when he met Lee Eun-bi and stood by her side, even when Kang So-young decided to make her life hell. He developed one sided feelings for her and confesses to her later on.

- Nam Joo-hyuk as Han Yi-an
  - Go Woo-rim as young Han Yi-an

A star swimmer at Sekang High School. He was great childhood friend with Go Eun-byul, and had feelings for her. He is loyal to his friends and although from a poor background, works really hard to help his father at the same time to become a national champion in swimming. He starts to question the identity of Eun-byul (who is actually Eun-bi in disguise), but as time goes by, he falls for Eun-bi unknowingly.

=== Supporting ===
Class 2–3

- Lee Pil-mo as Kim Joon-seok (homeroom teacher)

He is pricked by his guilty conscience after a massive cover-up involving the death of one of his students.

- Lee David as Park Min-joon (class president)

An intelligent and hardworking student who is always at the top of his class. Pressured by his study-centric mother to do well, he feels overwhelmed.As part of Min-joon's character arc, we have his canonical love interest: Sam, a somewhat outgoing girl from his class with whom he ends up in a lovely relationship by the end of the series.

- Kim Hee-jung as Cha Song-joo

Go Eun-byul and Lee Shi-jin's best friend. She is torn between staying loyal to Eun-byul and accepting So-young's friendship advances. After finding out Lee Eun-bi's real identity, she also became best friends with her.

- Lee Cho-hee as Lee Shi-jin

She is best friends with Go Eun-byul and Cha Sung-joo. She is jealous of her friends who seem to have a passion and tries to seek out one of her own. After finding out Lee Eun-bi's real identity, she also became best friends with her.

- Cho Soo-hyang as Kang So-young

A school bully who found pleasure in bullying Eun-bi. Her transfer to Eun-byul's school soon leads to mistrust and problems between the students.

- Park Doo-shik as Kwon Ki-tae

The leader of the class's delinquent gang who often harasses Tae-kwang. He was Hae-na's boyfriend.

- Lee Hwa-kyum (Note: Credited as Lee Yoo-young.) as Jo Hae-na
- Jang In-sub as Sung Yoon-jae
- Kim Bo-ra as Seo Young-eun
- Kim Min-seok as Min-suk

A member of Ki-tae's gang

- Choi Hyo-eun as Hyo-eun
- Lee Jin-kwon as Jin-kwon
- Ji Ha-yoon as Ha-yoon
- Park Ah-sung as Ah-sung
- Seo Cho-won as Cho-won
- Jo Byeong-kyu as Byung-gyu
- Kwon Eun-soo as Eun-soo
- Oh Woo-jin as Woo-jin
- Jung Ye-ji as Ye-ji
- Lee Seung-ho as Seung-ho
- Han Sung-yun as Sung-yeon

Sekang High School faculty

- Lee Hee-do as Vice principal
- Shin Jung-geun as Dean of students
- Jung Soo-young as Ahn Ju-ri
- Lee Si-won as Jung Min-young
- Choi Dae-chul as Swimming coach
- Kim Jin-yi as Health teacher

Parents

- Jeon Mi-seon as Song Mi-kyung (Eun-byul's adoptive mother and later Eun-bi's)
- Jeon No-min as Director Gong Jae-ho (Tae-kwang's father)
- Jung In-gi as Park Joon-hyung (Min-joon's father)
- Kim Jung-nan as Shin Jung-min (Min-joon's mother)
- Kim Se-ah as Shin Yi-young (Shi-jin's mother)
- Oh Yoon-hong as Min-young and In-soo's mother
- Jo Deok-hyun as Prosecutor Kang (So-young's father)
- Jung Jae-eun as So-young's mother
- Lee Dae-yeon as Han Ki-choon (Yi-ahn's father)

=== Extended ===
- Yang Hee-kyung as Park Min-kyung (House of Love's administrator)
- Oh Hee-joon as Food delivery man
- Lee Kang-min as Han Yi-an's swimming senior (ep. 2, 4–5, 11, 16)
- Yoo Se-hyung as Han Yi-an's swimming senior (ep. 2, 4–5, 11, 16)
- Yoo Yeon-mi as Yeon Mi-joo (ep. 5–7, 12)

=== Special appearances ===
- Lee Hyun-kyung as Nuri High School teacher (ep. 1)
- Lee Jae-in as Ra-jin (ep. 1, 5, 14)
- Shin Seung-joon & Lee Ho-geun as announcers (ep.1)
- Park Young-soo as noraebang owner (ep. 2)
- Park Hwan-hee as Kim Kyung-jin (Eun-bi's bully; ep. 1)
- Kim Min-young as Lee Soo-mi (Eun-bi's bully; ep. 1, 4–6)
- Lee Jung-eun as Seo Young-eun's mother (ep. 2–3)
- Choi Su-rin as Song Hee-young (Tae-kwang's mother; ep. 4, 12, 14)
- Jung In-seo as Jung Soo-in
- Yum Gyung-hwan (ep. 6)
- Kim Ga-young as school uniform model (ep. 6)
- Sam Hammington as Sekang High's new English teacher (ep. 15)
- Bae Soo-bin as Sekang High 2–3 class' homeroom teacher (ep. 16)
- Kim Min-kyu as a swimmer

== Ratings ==
Ep.	Original broadcast date	Average audience share			
Ep.	Original broadcast date	Nielsen Korea		TNmS	
Ep.	Original broadcast date	Nationwide	Seoul	Nationwide	Seoul
1	April 27, 2015	3.8% (NR)	3.4% (NR)	4.8% (NR)	5.1% (NR)
2	April 28, 2015	4.2% (NR)	3.8% (NR)	4.8% (NR)	4.8% (NR)
3	May 4, 2015	4.1% (NR)	4.1% (NR)	6.5% (NR)	6.6% (NR)
4	May 5, 2015	5.9% (NR)	5.7% (NR)	6.3% (NR)	6.8% (NR)
5	May 11, 2015	5.0% (NR)	5.6% (NR)	6.7% (NR)	7.4% (NR)
6	May 12, 2015	6.0% (NR)	6.5% (NR)	7.1% (NR)	7.8% (20th)
7	May 18, 2015	6.0% (NR)	6.4% (NR)	7.3% (NR)	8.0% (NR)
8	May 19, 2015	6.7% (NR)	7.2% (NR)	7.6% (NR)	8.0% (NR)
9	May 25, 2015	6.8% (NR)	7.0% (NR)	7.8% (19th)	8.9% (18th)
10	May 26, 2015	7.1% (17th)	7.1% (19th)	7.4% (17th)	8.2% (15th)
11	June 1, 2015	6.9% (NR)	7.9% (NR)	8.2% (17th)	9.2% (15th)
12	June 2, 2015	7.0% (19th)	7.6% (18th)	8.1% (17th)	8.9% (14th)
13	June 8, 2015	7.7% (19th)	8.1% (15th)	8.9% (16th)	10.3% (14th)
14	June 9, 2015	8.1% (14th)	8.6% (18th)	8.6% (14th)	9.9% (11th)
15	June 15, 2015	7.5% (NR)	8.1% (18th)	9.2% (16th)	10.0% (12th)
16	June 16, 2015	8.2% (16th)	8.5% (15th)	9.7% (10th)	11.7% (6th)
Average		6.3%	6.6%	7.4%	8.2%
In the table above, the blue numbers represent the lowest ratings and the red numbers represent the highest ratings.; NR denotes that the drama did not rank in the top 20 daily programs on that date.; The series aired on KBS World, two weeks after its initial broadcast, with English subtitles.

== Original soundtrack ==
Who Are You: School 2015 OST

Soundtrack album by Various artists
- Recorded: 2015
- Genre: Soundtrack
- Languages: Korean; English
- Label: CJ E&M
- Producer: Shim Entertainment

=== Part 1 ===
Released on April 27, 2015
No.	Title	Artist	Length
1.	"Reset"	Tiger JK feat. Jinsil	4:02
2.	"Reset" (Inst.)		4:02
Total length:			8:04

=== Part 2 ===
Released on May 4, 2015
No.	Title	Artist	Length
1.	"Blow Away (바람에 날려)"	Baechigi feat. Punch	3:11
2.	"Blow Away (바람에 날려)" (Inst.)		3:11
Total length:			6:22

=== Part 3 ===
Released on May 15, 2015
No.	Title	Artist	Length
1.	"I'll Listen to What You Have to Say (너의 얘길 들어줄게)"	Yoon Mi-rae	3:14
2.	"I'll Listen to What You Have to Say (너의 얘길 들어줄게)" (Inst.)		3:14
Total length:			6:28

=== Part 4 ===
Released on May 18, 2015
No.	Title	Artist	Length
1.	"Remember"	Byul	3:37
2.	"Remember" (Inst.)		3:37
Total length:			7:14

=== Part 5 ===
Released on May 25, 2015
No.	Title	Artist	Length
1.	"Pray (기도)"	Younha	4:18
2.	"Pray (기도)" (Inst.)		4:18
Total length:			8:36

=== Part 6 ===
Released on June 1, 2015
No.	Title	Artist	Length
1.	"Named (그 이름)"	Jonghyun and Taemin (SHINee)	3:37
2.	"Named (그 이름)" (Inst.)		3:37
Total length:			7:14

=== Part 7 ===
Released on June 8, 2015
No.	Title	Artist	Length
1.	"Return"	Wendy (Red Velvet) feat. Yuk Ji-dam	3:48
2.	"Return" (Inst.)		3:48
Total length:			7:36

=== Part 8 ===
Released on June 16, 2015
No.	Title	Artist	Length
1.	"Love Song"	Yook Sung-jae (BtoB) (feat. Park Hye-su)	3:25
2.	"Love Song" (Inst.)		3:25
Total length:			6:50

Disc 2:
No.	Title	Artist	Length
1.	"Who Are You?" (Opening Title)	Various Artists	3:34
2.	"Akmong"	Various Artists	2:42
3.	"Byul Bi Geurigo Eomma"	Various Artists	4:15
4.	"Fate"	Various Artists	3:01
5.	"Gieokhae Geurigo Saranghae"	Various Artists	3:40
6.	"Gieoksokeuro"	Various Artists	4:06
7.	"Hakkyopookryuk"	Various Artists	1:22
8.	"Iljin"	Various Artists	2:16
9.	"It's Okay"	Various Artists	3:01
10.	"Naegen gidaeeododwae"	Various Artists	3:22
11.	"O Gyoshi"	Various Artists	3:35
12.	"Prayer"	Various Artists	3:48
13.	"Who Am I?"	Various Artists	4:09

== Awards and nominations ==
Year	Award	Category	Recipient	Result	Ref.
2015	8th Korea Drama Awards	Best New Actor	Yook Sung-jae	Nominated	
2015	8th Korea Drama Awards	Best New Actor	Nam Joo-hyuk	Nominated	
2015	8th Korea Drama Awards	Best New Actress	Cho Soo-hyang	Nominated	
2015	8th Korea Drama Awards	Star of the Year	Kim So-hyun	Won	
2015	4th APAN Star Awards	Best New Actor	Yook Sung-jae	Nominated	
2015	4th APAN Star Awards	Best New Actor	Nam Joo-hyuk	Won	
2015	KBS Drama Awards	Best New Actress	Kim So-hyun	Won	
2015	KBS Drama Awards	Best New Actress	Cho Soo-hyang	Nominated	
2015	KBS Drama Awards	Best New Actor	Yook Sung-jae	Nominated	
2015	KBS Drama Awards	Best New Actor	Nam Joo-hyuk	Nominated	
2015	KBS Drama Awards	Netizen Award, Actress	Kim So-hyun	Won	
2015	KBS Drama Awards	Popularity Award, Actor	Nam Joo-hyuk	Won	
2015	KBS Drama Awards	Best Couple Award	Yook Sung-jae and Kim So-hyun	Won	
2015	KBS Drama Awards	Best Couple Award	Nam Joo-hyuk and Kim So-hyun	Nominated	
2016	52nd Baeksang Arts Awards	Best New Actor (TV)	Yook Sung-jae	Nominated	
2016	11th Soompi Awards	Breakout Actor	Nam Joo-hyuk	Won	
2016	11th Soompi Awards	Best Bromance	Nam Joo-hyuk and Yook Sung-jae	Nominated	
2016	11th Soompi Awards	Best Supernatural Drama	Who Are You: School 2015	Won	
2016	11th Soompi Awards	Best Drama OST	Tiger JK feat. Jinsil (Reset)	Won	

== Remake ==
- The Thai remake of the series with the title Who Are You was announced by GMMTV during their "New & Next" event last October 15, 2019 featuring Tipnaree Weerawatnodom (Namtan), Perawat Sangpotirat (Krist) and Kay Lertsittichai. Produced by GMMTV and Nar-ra-tor, it premiered on May 2, 2020, on GMM 25 and Line TV.
- The Mandarin remake of the series with title When We Were Young was made in 2017, adapting the main theme of this Korean Drama. The show starred Zhang Xue Ying, Joseph Zeng & Wang Bo Wen with supporting role by Wang Yi Bo & Xiao Lu Yu
- The Urdu adaptation of the series with title Judwaa starring Aina Asif as Twin sisters Saara & Zaara. The drama aired from 6th February 2025 having 60 Episodes. The drama showed Paternal Cousin & her mother as Villains & bullies torturing a helpless Saara. Saara tries to commit suicide & gets replaced with Zaara, who exposes the villains.
