= Choi Hyo-eun =

South Korean actress

- Born: Choi Won-Jung; 2 March 1994 (age 32); Daejeon, South Korea
- Other name: Choi Won-jeong
- Education: Cheongju University (Department of Theater and Film)
- Occupations: Actress; model
- Years active: 2006–present
- Agent: Star Iyagi Entertainment

Korean name
- Hangul: 최효은
- RR: Choe Hyoeun
- MR: Ch'oe Hyoŭn

Choi Hyo-eun (born 2 March 1994) is a South Korean actress and model.

== Early life ==
Choi studied theatre and film at Cheongju University. Choi is an actress under the artist management company Star Iyagi Entertainment.

== Career ==
She started her acting career in 2006 when she was 14 years old in her first film role A Dirty Carnival. In 2007 when she was 15 years old appeared in the MBC drama Assorted Gems. In 2011, she continued to appear on the small screen with the movie All My Love. In 2010 she appeared as a student girl in 2AM's music video worldcup song No. 1. Two years later, Choi Hyo Eun got her second film role through Fists of Legend. She also starred in the popular drama Princess Aurora as a supporting actor. In 2014, she made a strong impression on the audience when she appeared in five consecutive films on television, notably My Love from the Star and SBS's You're All Surrounded. In 2015 she appeared in the popular drama Who Are You: School 2015 as Hyo-eun, she was praised for her acting. Choi also appeared in Fight for My Way, and she played a supporting role. She also acted in the famous and popular drama Rain or Shine.

== Personal life ==
She is related to western painter Choi Young-rim, her grandfather from the paternal side of family.

== Filmography ==
=== Television ===
Year	Title	Role	Ref.
2007	Ugly Miss Young-ae	Go-young	
2009	Assorted Gems	Jae-eun	
2010	All My Love for You	Jin-ah	
2013	Princess Aurora	Lee-jeong	
2013	One Well-Raised Daughter	Shin-hee	
2013	My Love from the Star	Hyo-na	
2014	You're All Surrounded	Park Soo-bin	
2014	Reset	Miss. Jang	
2014	My Lovely Girl	Mi-sung	
2015	Kill Me, Heal Me	Joo Mi-ra	
2015	Who Are You: School 2015	Hyo-eun	
2015	Mrs. Cop	Kim Na-rae	
2016	Bring It On, Ghost	Hyo-eun	
2017	Fight for My Way	Mai-ei	
2017	Oh, the Mysterious	Kim-ji	
2017	Rain or Shine	Hwa-sai	
2018	Should We Kiss First?	Kim Si-ra	
2021	Now, We Are Breaking Up	Lee Seong-min	
2022	The Forbidden Marriage	Makeup Artist	

=== Film ===
Year	Title	Role	Language	Ref.
2006	A Dirty Carnival	Accompanying Pianist	Korean	
2013	Fists of Legend	Eun-soo	Korean	

=== Music video appearances ===
Year	Title	Artist	Ref.
2010	"No. 1"	2AM	

== Ambassadorship ==
- 2020: Public Relations Ambassador for the International Peace Film Festival
