= Ji Ha-yoon =

South Korean actress and model

- Born: Ji Yoon-mi; February 10, 1995 (age 31); Seoul, South Korea
- Other name: Ji Ha-yun
- Education: Konyang University (Department of Medical Beauty)
- Occupations: Actress; model
- Years active: 2015–present

Korean name
- Hangul: 지윤미
- Hanja: 池潤美
- RR: Ji Yunmi
- MR: Chi Yunmi

Stage name
- Hangul: 지하윤
- RR: Ji Hayun
- MR: Chi Hayun

Ji Ha-yoon (Korean: 지하윤; born February 10, 1995), birth name Ji Yoon-mi (지윤미), is a South Korean actress and model.

== Filmography ==
=== Television series ===
Year	Title	Role
2015	Who Are You: School 2015	Ha-yoon
2015	Second 20s	Min-ae
2015	Bubble Gum	Lee Jin-ah (ep.1)
2016	Come Back Mister	Song Yi-yeon (young)

=== Music video appearances ===
Year	Song title	Artist
2015	"Time Forgets"	Yoon Hyun-sang
2015	"Airplane"	iKON
