= Han Sung-yun =

South Korean actress (born 1997)

- Born: 12 July 1997 (age 29); Seoul, South Korea
- Other names: Han Sung-yeon, Han Seong-yeon, Han Seong-yun
- Education: Dongduk Women's University (Department of Broadcasting & Entertainment)
- Occupations: Actress; model
- Years active: 2015–present
- Agent: BB Entertainment
- Known for: Who Are You: School 2015; Second 20s Come, Together

Korean name
- Hangul: 한성연
- RR: Han Seongyeon
- MR: Han Sŏngyŏn
- Website: bbent.co.kr

Han Sung-yun (Korean: 한성연; born 12 July 1997) is a South Korean actress and model. She is best known for her roles in dramas such as Who Are You: School 2015, Second 20s and Cheo Yong.

== Filmography ==
=== Television series ===
Year	Title	Role	Ref.
2015	My Beautiful Bride	Cha Yoon-mi	
2015	Who Are You: School 2015	Sung-yeon	
2015	Second 20s	Hyun-jung	
2015	Cheo Yong 2	Kim Yeon-jin (S2E4)	
2020	It's Okay to be Sensitive 2020	Lee Do-eun	
2021	Be My Dream Family	young In Young-hye	
2021	The King's Affection	Yu-gong	
2023	Revenant	Cafe restroom woman	

=== Film ===
Year	Title	Role	Language	Ref.
2016	Come, Together	Ah-yeong	Korean	
2018	The Princess and the Matchmaker	Song-hwa (maid)	Korean	
2025	Streaming	Sung-yeon	Korean	
