= Kim Jin-yi =

South Korean actress (born 1982)

- Born: November 7, 1982 (age 43); South Korea
- Other names: Kim Jin-i, Kim Jinyi
- Education: Sungkyunkwan University (Department of Acting Arts and Bachelor)
- Occupations: Actress; model
- Years active: 1990–present
- Known for: Reset; Cheo Yong; Love in the Moonlight
- Spouse: Oh Hee-joong (m. 2017)

Korean name
- Hangul: 김진이
- RR: Gim Jini
- MR: Kim Chini

Kim Jin-yi (Korean: 김진이; born November 7, 1982) is a South Korean actress and model. She made her debut in the 1990s. She is known for her roles in dramas such as Reset, Cheo Yong and Love in the Moonlight.

== Personal life ==
She and Oh Hee-joong, who is also an actor, are married. They both married at Seoul in 2017.

== Filmography ==
=== Television series ===
Year	Title	Role	Ref.
1993	Puberty	Mi-yin	
2005	The Conker Tree	Baek Hye-wook	
2006	Secret Campus	Oh Hye-ra	
2012	Dream of the Emperor	Shi-no	
2014	Cheo Yong	Dong-mi's friend	
2014	Reset	Han Mi-seon	
2014	Single-minded Dandelion	Choi Jung-won	
2015	Who Are You: School 2015	Health teacher	
2016	Love in the Moonlight	Pregnant court lady	
2021	Vincenzo	Past Client	

=== Film ===
Year	Title	Role	Ref.
2004	Ice Rain	Kwon Sang-hee	
2011	Themselves	Jin-yi	
2019	Eunseo	Eun-seo	
2020	Wagjak to the ceiling of your mouth	Bong Soo-ah's friend	
