= Jung In-seo =

South Korean actress (born 2000)

- Born: Jung In-seo; 9 May 2000 (age 26); South Korea
- Other names: Jeong In-seo, Jung In-suh
- Education: Moonhyeon High School
- Occupations: Actress; singer; model
- Years active: 2007–present
- Agent: Noah Entertainment
- Known for: Store Struck by Lightning; Who Are You: School 2015; Drama Special Season 2: Duet

Jung In-seo (born May 9, 2000) is a South Korean actress. She is best known for her main roles in Store Struck by Lightning, Drama Special Season 2: Duet, and the film Silenced.

== Filmography ==
=== Television ===
Year	Title	Role	Ref.
2008	Iljimae	Sumsumyi	
2008	Byul Soon Geom 2	Kott Bong	
2008–2009	Star's Lover	In-seo	
2009	Empress Cheonchu	Queen Won Pyung	
2011	KBS Drama Special: "Duet"	Han Joon-hee	
2012	Drama Special Series: "SOS - Save Our School"	Kim Chung-na	
2012	Take Care of Us, Captain	Jung	
2013	Thunder Store	Jung In-seo	
2014	KBS Drama Special: "Different Cries"	Supporting role	
2015	Who Are You: School 2015	Jung Soo-in	
2016	My Fair Lady	So-hee	
2017	Witch at Court	Yoon Ah-reum	
2018	Big Forest	Shin Na-yeong	
2019	Haechi	Go-mi	

=== Film ===
Year	Title	Role	Language	Ref.
2010	Wedding Dress	Jung Ahn	Korean	
2011	Silenced	Yoo-ri	Korean	
2013	My Dear Girl, Jin-young	In-seo	Korean	
