= Seo Cho-won =

South Korean actress (born 1995)

- Born: Seo Cho-won; 6 September 1995 (age 31); South Korea
- Other names: Cho, Chowon
- Occupations: Actress; model
- Years active: 2014–present
- Known for: Who Are You: School 2015; Cheo Yong; Reply 1988

Korean name
- Hangul: 서초원
- RR: Seo Chowon
- MR: Sŏ Ch'owŏn

Seo Cho-won (Korean: 서초원; born September 6, 1995) is a South Korean actress and model. She is best known for supporting roles in dramas. She has appeared in the school series Who Are You: School 2015 as Cho-won.

== Filmography ==
=== Television ===
Year	Title	Role	Ref.
2014	Cheo Yong		
2014	Gap-dong		
2015	Who Are You: School 2015	Cho-won	
2015–2016	Reply 1988		
2016	On the Way to the Airport		
2017–2018	Judge vs. Judge		
2018	Tale of Fairy		
