= Kwon Eun-soo =

South Korean actress (born 1989)

- Born: Kwon Eun-soo; February 4, 1989 (age 37); South Korea
- Other name: Kwon Eun-su
- Education: Induk University (Broadcasting)
- Occupation: Actress
- Years active: 2006–present
- Known for: Wild Flowers; Who Are You: School 2015; If You Were Me 4

Korean name
- Hangul: 권은수
- RR: Gwon Eunsu
- MR: Kwŏn Ŭnsu

Kwon Eun-soo (Korean: 권은수; born February 4, 1989) is a South Korean actress. She is best known for her lead roles in If You Were Me 4 as So-young and Wild Flowers as Eun-soo. She also did a supporting role and appeared in the famous and popular drama Who Are You: School 2015 as Eun-soo.

== Biography and career ==
Kwon studied broadcasting at Induk University. She started her acting career in 2006.

== Filmography ==
=== Television ===
Year	Title	Role	Ref.
2012	Quiz of God	Kim Han-sook	
2014	Flower Grandpa Investigation Unit	Guem Mae-sil	
2015	Who Are You: School 2015	Eun-soo	
2016	Hello, My Twenties!	Kim Han So-yeong	
2016	Spark	Gong Ah-reum	
2016	Second to Last Love	Miss Kim	
2017	Hello, My Twenties! 2	Kim Han So-yeong	
2020	Find Me in Your Memory	News Media Staff	
2020	Record of Youth	Gateway casting interviewer	
2020	Mr. Queen	Court Lady	
2022	Unlock My Boss	Nurse	

=== Film ===
Year	Title	Role	Language	Ref.
2009	If You Were Me 4	So-young	Korean	
2010	Read My Lips	Eun-soo	Korean	
2011	Glove	Sang-mi	Korean	
2012	Masquerade	Gwang-hae	Korean	
2012	Love Clinique	Jin	Korean	
2013	Fists of Legend	Writer Kwon	Korean	
2015	Wild Flowers	Eunsoo	Korean	
2019	Tune in for Love	Kwon Eun-soo	Korean	
