= Jung Shin-hye =

South Korean actress (born 1994)

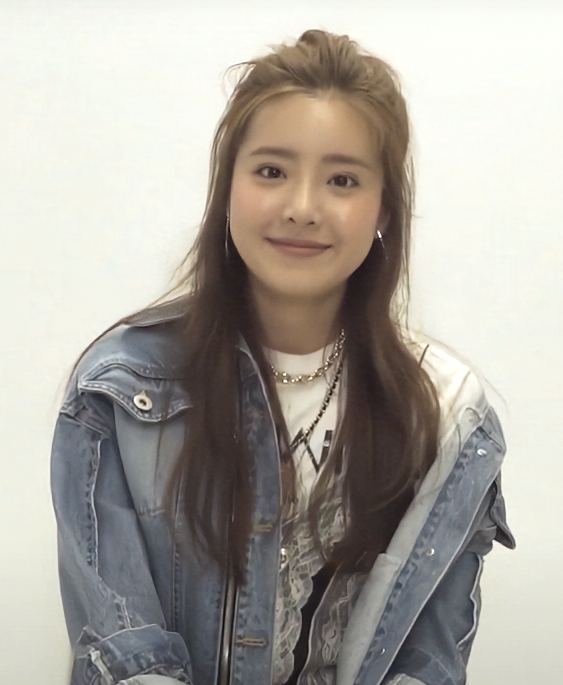
- Jung in 2019
- Born: 11 October 1994 (age 32); Suncheon, South Korea
- Other name: Jeong Shin-hye
- Education: Korea National University of Arts (Department of Theater Academy)
- Occupation: Actress
- Years active: 2015–present
- Agent: Ace Factory
- Known for: Angry Mom; Snowdrop; Cheer Up

Korean name
- Hangul: 정신혜
- RR: Jeong Sinhye
- MR: Chŏng Sinhye

Jung Shin-hye (Korean: 정신혜; born 11 October 1994) is a South Korean actress. She is known for her roles in dramas such as Angry Mom, Love Playlist, Snowdrop, Confession Company and Cheer Up. She also appeared in movies Seondal: The Man Who Sells the River and Detour.

== Filmography ==
=== Television series ===
Year	Title	Role	Ref.
2015	Angry Mom	Lee Hwang-song	
2020	Memorist	Yoo Ah-young	
2021	Snowdrop	Go Hye-ryeong	
2022	Crazy Love	Oh Se-hee	
2022	Cheer Up	Lee Ha-jin	
2023	My Perfect Stranger	Lee Cheong-ah	
2023	Moon in the Day	Jung Yi-seul	
2023	The Matchmakers	Maeng Ha-na	
2025	History of Scruffiness	Kim Chae-yeong	
2025	The Potato Lab	Yoon Hee-jin	

=== Web series ===
Year	Title	Role	Ref.
2017–19	Love Playlist	Jung Ji-won	
2018	Flower Ever After	Shin-hye	
2019	Re-Feel	Jung Ji-won	
2019	The Best Ending	Jung Ji-won	
2019	Pu Reum's Vlog	Jung Ji-won	
2019	I Love You, Loser!	Jin Da-eun	
2019	4 Reasons Why I Hate Christmas	Jung Ji-won	
2019	Confession Company	Shin-hye	
2020	Fight Hard, Love Harder 2	Areum	
2020	Mermaid Prince	Shin Hye-ri	
2021	Ply Friends 2	Jung Ji-won	

=== Film ===
Year	Title	Role	Ref.
2016	Seondal: The Man Who Sells the River	Royal villa court lady	
2016	Detour	Ah-reum	

=== Music video appearances ===
Year	Title	Artist	Length	Ref.
2019	"Perfect"	10cm	4:12	
2019	"Clumsy Confession"	Brother Su	3:41	
