= Seondal: The Man Who Sells the River =

- Official poster
- Hangul: 봉이 김선달
- RR: Bongi Gim Seondal
- MR: Pongi Kim Sŏndal
- Directed by: Park Dae-Min
- Screenplay by: Park Dae-Min
- Based on: Bongyi Kim Sunda
- Starring: Yoo Seung-ho; Cho Jae-hyun; Ko Chang-seok; Ra Mi-ran; Kim Min-seok
- Cinematography: Kim Jong-jin
- Edited by: Kim Sang-beom; Kim Jae-beom
- Production companies: M Pictures; SNK Pictures
- Distributed by: CJ Entertainment
- Release date: July 6, 2016
- Running time: 121 mins
- Country: South Korea
- Language: Korean
- Box office: US$15 million

Seondal: The Man Who Sells the River (Korean: 봉이 김선달), also known as Kim Seon-dal, is a 2016 South Korean period satire adventure comedy film based on an ancient novel of satire and humor about Kim Seon-dal who sold off the Taedong River. The filming began on June 5, 2015, and finished September 30, 2015.

== Synopsis ==
Kim Seondal (Yoo Seung-Ho) is a genius swindler, possessing an alluring appearance and boldness. He works with Bo-Won (Ko Chang-seok), female Buddhist Yoon (Ra Mi-ran) and Gyeon (Kim Min-seok). The swindler team is famous nationwide. For their plan, they have to deceive the most powerful man Sung Dae-Ryeon (Cho Jae-Hyun)

== Cast ==
=== Principal ===
- Yoo Seung-ho as Kim In Hong / Kim Seon-Dal
- Cho Jae-hyun as Sung Dae-Ryeon
- Ko Chang-seok as Bo-Won
- Ra Mi-ran as Buddhist nun Yoon
- Kim Min-seok as Gyeon-I

=== Supporting ===
- Jeon Seok-ho as Lee Wan
- Seo Yea-ji as Gyu-Young
- Kim Young-pil as Seong Jong-ik
- Choi Gwi-hwa as Cross-dresser fraud nobleman
- Lee Jun-hyeok as Receiver
- Ki Joo-bong as Owner of trading post
- Kwon Tae-won as Second vice-premier
- Kwak In-joon as Manager of the household of high official
- Seo Jeong-joo as Dobatai
- Kim Jong-soo as Noh Dae-gam (Phoenix porcelain fraud Excellency)
- Lee Seon-hee as Village lady
- Ko In-beom as Big trader
- Oh Yoon-hong as Fortune-telling fraud woman

=== Extended ===
- Joo Yeong-ho as Palace guard
- Kim Seo-kyeong as Palace guard
- Lee Kyu-hyung as Chief officer at tobacco guard post
- Min Kyeong-jin as Mr. Choi at cotton fabric store
- Kim Seung-hoon as eunuch
- Lee Sun-hee as Mastermind of the household
- Lim Jong-yun as Yi Seong-gye
- Yu Soon-woong as Han Bong-soo
- Song Jae-ryong as Farmer
- Choi Jong-ryul as Merchantman
- Jang Jun-nyeong as Prince Cheong
- Kim Kyeong-ryong as Jewelry seller
- Jo Seong-hun as Jewelry seller
- Kim Hye-won as Head of Hanyang Gibang House
- Ha Su-ho as Dampago Warehouse guard
- Jo Hyun-sik as Dampago Warehouse guard
- Kwon Geon-heung as Son of the examiner
- Kim Seung-hoon as Royal villa, palace of the Queen, eunuch
- Jung Shin-hye as Maid of honor of the Detached Palace
- Baek Cheon-gi as guard of the Detached Palace
- Shin Du-hwan as guard of the Detached Palace
- Kim Min-hyeok as Lee Wan's learner
- Kim Tae-min as Lee Wan's learner
- Han Sang-woo as Lee Wan's learner
- Yu Il-han as Sung Jong-ik's learner
- Jo Wi-sang as Sung Jong-ik's learner
- An Jae-won as Sung Jong-ik's learner
- Park Kwang-jae as Sung Jong-ik's furniture
- Byeon Jin-wan as Dampago's guard
- Kwon Yong-chae as Dampago's guard
- Kim Jeong-ho as Dampago's guard
- Park Dae-gyu as Sung Dae-Ryeon's soldier
- Jo Yong-jun as Sung Dae-Ryeon's soldier
- Jang Jae-hyuk as Sung Dae-Ryeon's soldier
- Choi Jeong-hyun as Sung Dae-Ryeon's soldier
- Park Sang-hyun as Sung Dae-Ryeon's soldier
- Lee Ju-han as Sung Dae-Ryeon's soldier
- Lee Bo-ra as Crown Prince's maid
- Uhm Ji-man as Diver
- Kwon Yong-sik as Diver
- Kim Gil-dong as Cheong's commander
- Mun Sung-bok as Lee Sung-gyu's aide
- Choi Je-heon as Lee Sung-gyu's soldier
- Kim Chang-hui as Armed escort
- Lee Yu-hyun as Armed escort
- Jeon Sung-hwan as Soldier
- Kim Tae-hyun as Dampago's shopkeeper
- Shim Chae-won as Sung Dae-Ryeon's maid
- Park Ye-seul as Hanyang gibang's Geisha
- Choi Yun-bin as Palanquin holder
- Choi Suk-jun as Palanquin holder
- Park Jin-sung Hanyang gibang's servant

=== Guest appearance ===
- Yeon Woo-jin as King Hyojong
- Kim Jung-hwa as Head operator at Pyongyang gisaeng salon
