= Bae Yoon-kyung =

South Korean actress

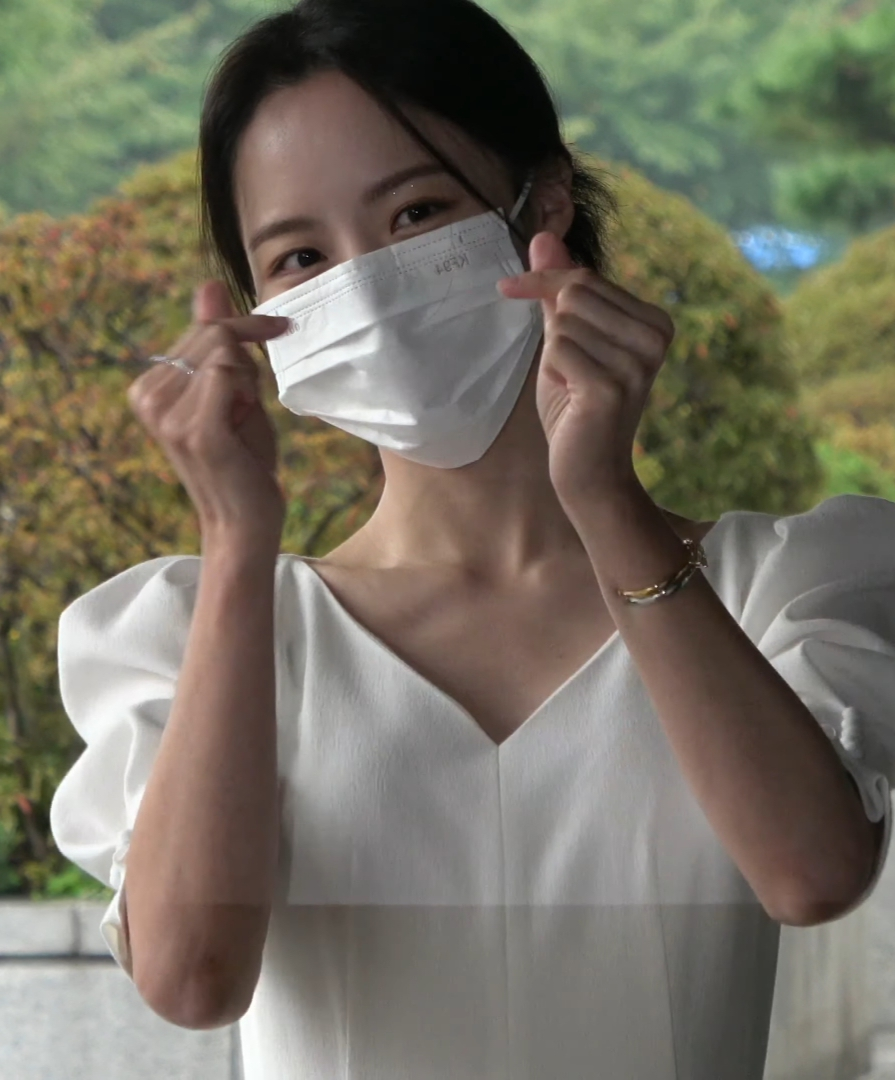
- Bae in 2021
- Born: January 22, 1993 (age 33); South Korea
- Education: Konkuk University – Department of Costume Design
- Occupations: Actress; model
- Years active: 2017–present
- Agent: Lucky Entertainment

Korean name
- Hangul: 배윤경
- Hanja: 裴允京
- RR: Bae Yungyeong
- MR: Pae Yun'gyŏng

Bae Yoon-kyung (Korean: 배윤경; born January 22, 1993) is a South Korean actress and model. She is known for her lead roles in Joseon Beauty Pageant (2018) and The King's Affection (2021). She also appeared in dramas The Miracle We Met (2018), Doctor Prisoner (2019)., Hi Bye, Mama! (2020), My Unfamiliar Family (2020), and Undercover (2021).

== Filmography ==
=== Television series ===
| Year | Title | Role | Notes | Ref. |
|---|---|---|---|---|
| 2017 | You Are Too Much | Ji-ha | | |
| 2018 | The Miracle We Met | Sun Hye-jin | | |
| 2018 | Joseon Beauty Pageant | Dan-yi | Main role | |
| 2018 | Drama Special – "Socialization – Understanding of Dance" | Yoon-mi | Season 10 | |
| 2018 | The Sound of Your Heart: Reboot | Sook-ja | | |
| 2018 | Clean with Passion for Now | Eun-hee | Cameo | |
| 2018 | The Sound of Your Heart: Reboot Season 2 | Sook-ja | | |
| 2018 | Less Than Evil | Woo Tae-hee | | |
| 2019 | Doctor Prisoner | Jung Se-jin | | |
| 2020 | Hi Bye, Mama! | Park Hye-jin | | |
| 2020 | My Unfamiliar Family | So-young | | |
| 2020 | She Knows Everything | Lee Hyun-ji | | |
| 2020 | Record of Youth | Kim Su-man | Cameo | |
| 2021 | Drama Stage – "On the Way to the Gynecologist" | Kim So-jin | Season 4 | |
| 2021 | Undercover | Mi-seon | | |
| 2021 | The King's Affection | Shin So-eun | | |
| 2022 | Drama Special – "Do You Know Ashtanga" | Kang Na-ra | one act-drama | |
| 2023 | Crash Course in Romance | Hye-yeon | Cameo | |
| 2024 | Wedding Impossible | Yoon Chae-won | | |

=== Web series ===
| Year | Title | Role | Ref. |
|---|---|---|---|
| 2022 | Unicorn | Carol | |

=== Television shows ===
| Year | Title | Role | Ref. |
|---|---|---|---|
| 2017 | Heart Signal | Cast member | |
| 2019 | Law of the Jungle in Sunda Islands | Cast member | |

== Awards and nominations ==
Name of the award ceremony, year presented, category, nominee of the award, and the result of the nomination
| Award ceremony | Year | Category | Nominee / Work | Result | Ref. |
|---|---|---|---|---|---|
| KBS Drama Awards | 2022 | Best Actress in Drama Special/TV Cinema | In My Ashtanga Class | Nominated | |
