= Kim Hyun-jin =

South Korean actor (born 1996)

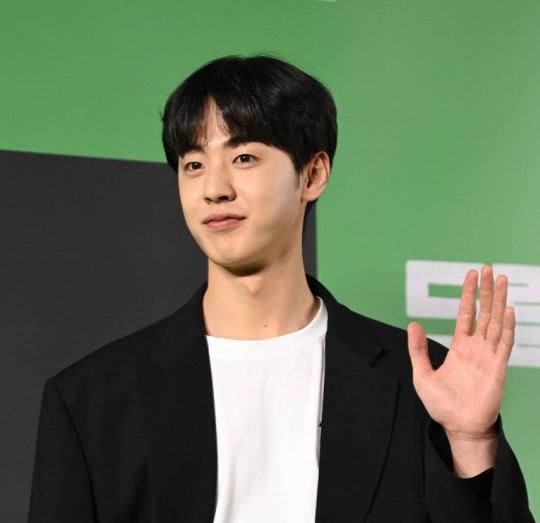
- Kim in April 2023
- Born: August 24, 1996 (age 30); South Korea
- Other name: Kim Hyeon-jin
- Occupations: Actor; model
- Years active: 2015–present
- Agent: AER Entertainment

Korean name
- Hangul: 김현진
- RR: Gim Hyeonjin
- MR: Kim Hyŏnjin

Kim Hyun-jin (Korean: 김현진; born August 24, 1996) is a South Korean actor and model. He is known for his roles in dramas such as Can You Deliver Time? (2020), Sugar Coating (2020), Peach of Time (2021), Peng (2021) and Cheer Up (2022)

== Early life and education ==
Kim was born on August 24, 1996, and attended an all-boys high school.

== Career ==
=== 2015: Modelling career ===
Kim joined YG KPlus and made his debut as a model in 2015, making appearances as a runway model in a number of modeling shows for Kimseoryon, D.Gnak, Caruso, Sling Stone and SongGzio Homme, Ordinary People. He also appeared in magazines Go Korea and Dazed Korea. He also appeared in commercials for Subway and Banila Co.

=== 2020–present: Acting career ===
Kim worked with WM Company to pursue a career in acting, citing Park Seo-joon as his role model. Kim was cast in the web series Sugar Coating and Can You Deliver Time? in 2020.

In 2021, he appeared in drama Peach of Time and he also appeared in drama Peng starring with actress Yoon So-hee.

In April 2025, after YG Entertainment announced it would end its actor management division, Kim signed an exclusive contract with AER Entertainment, a subsidiary of Story J Company.

== Personal life ==
=== Military service ===
Kim completed his mandatory military service when he was 21 years old.

== Filmography ==
=== Film ===
Year	Title	Role	Ref.
2021	Peach of Time	Student	

=== Television series ===
Key
†	Denotes television productions that have not yet been released

Year	Title	Role	Ref.
2022	Cheer Up	Jin Sun-ho	
2024	Dreaming of a Freaking Fairy Tale	Baek Do-hong	
2024	My Sweet Mobster	Joo Il-young	
2025	Crushology 101	Jo A-rang	
2025	Nice to Not Meet You	Im Hyun-joon	
2025	I Dol I	Park Chung-jae	
2026	Love Phobia	Han Seon-ho	
2026	Francesca Next Door	Jang U-ju	
2026	One-of-a-Kind Romance	Tak Mu-i	

=== Web series ===
Year	Title	Role	Ref.
2020	Sugar Coating	Yoo Han-gyeol	
2020	Can You Deliver Time?	Park Woo-hyung	
2021	Peach of Time	Student	
2021	Peng	Yeon Ha-rim	
2026	Francesca Next Door	Jang Woo-ju	

=== Television shows ===
Year	Title	Role	Notes	Ref.
2025	Casting 1147km	Contestant		

=== Music video appearances ===
Year	Song title	Artist	Ref.
2026	"He Broke Up" (이별했대)	Gavy NJ	

== Discography ==
=== Singles ===
Title	Year	Album
"Height" (높이) (with Han Ji-hyun, Bae In-hyuk, and Jang Gyu-ri)	2022	Cheer Up OST

== Awards and nominations ==
Name of the award ceremony, year presented, category, nominee of the award, and the result of the nomination
Award ceremony	Year	Category	Nominee / Work	Result	Ref.
Asia Model Awards	2024	Rising Star Award (Actor)	Dreaming of a Freaking Fairy Tale, My Sweet Mobster	Won	
SBS Drama Awards	2022	Best New Actor	Cheer Up	Won	
SBS Drama Awards	2022	Best Supporting Team	Cheer Up	Won	
