= The Story of Park's Marriage Contract =

2023–2024 South Korean television series

- Promotional poster
- Hangul: 열녀박씨 계약결혼뎐
- Hanja: 烈女朴氏 契約結婚뎐
- Lit.: The Virtuous Woman Park Got Married by Contract
- RR: Yeollyeo Bakssi gyeyak gyeolhondyeon
- MR: Yŏllyŏ Pakssi kyeyak kyŏrhondyŏn
- Genre: Romantic comedy; Period drama; Fantasy
- Based on: The Story of Park's Marriage Contract by Angelique and Kim Neo-ul
- Developed by: Jang Jae-hoon; Kim Seong-wook
- Written by: Go Nam-jeong
- Directed by: Park Sang-hoon; Kang Chae-won
- Starring: Lee Se-young; Bae In-hyuk; Joo Hyun-young; Yoo Seon-ho; Jo Bok-rae
- Music by: Noh Hyung-woo
- Country of origin: South Korea
- Original language: Korean
- No. of episodes: 12

Production
- Executive producer: Moon Seon-ho
- Producers: Seo Jang-won; Choi Hee-seok; Yoo Hyun-jong
- Cinematography: Choi Jung-soon; Lee Sung-min
- Editors: Park So-young; Song Mi-kyung
- Running time: 70 minutes
- Production company: Chorokbaem Media
- Budget: ₩15.4 billion

Original release
- Network: MBC TV
- Release: November 24, 2023 – January 6, 2024

The Story of Park's Marriage Contract (Korean: 열녀박씨 계약결혼뎐) is a South Korean television series starring Lee Se-young, Bae In-hyuk, Joo Hyun-young, Yoo Seon-ho, and Jo Bok-rae. It aired on MBC TV from November 24, 2023, to January 6, 2024, every Friday and Saturday at 21:50 (KST). It is also available for streaming on Wavve in South Korea, and on Viu and Viki in selected regions.

== Synopsis ==
The Story of Park's Marriage Contract tells the story of Park Yeon-woo, a Joseon Confucian girl who struggles to return to Joseon after time-travelling 200 years in time to the year 2023 after being thrown into a well (murdered at the behest of her mother-in-law) by an unknown person after the death of her husband, Kang Tae-ha. This "murder" is driven by the advantages accrued by virtuous women's families.

== Cast ==
=== Main ===
- Lee Se-young as Park Yeon-woo
  - Lee Seol-ah as young Park Yeon-woo

A very recently widowed young noblewoman from the Confucian Joseon era who time-travels to the year 2023. She is a great seamstress and dressmaker in Hanyang and Tae-ha's fake bride.

- Bae In-hyuk as Kang Tae-ha
  - Kim Seo-joon as young Kang Tae-ha

The vice president of SH Seoul who is a standoffish man that prioritizes logic over emotions and a potential successor to SH Group.

- Joo Hyun-young as Sa-wol

Yeon-woo's handmaid and best friend, she is talkative, reckless, and has a good sense of humor.

- Yoo Seon-ho as Kang Tae-min

Tae-ha's half-brother who is a 3rd generation chaebol and a famous celebrity with a comical personality.

- Jo Bok-rae as Hong Seong-pyo

Tae-ha's secretary.

=== Supporting ===
==== Tae-ha's family ====
- Jin Kyung as Min Hye-suk / Lady Yoon

Tae-ha's stepmother and Tae-min's biological mother who is a representative of SH Seoul. She is a greedy person who has to have everything she wants and who ruthlessly cuts off anything that harms her.

- Chun Ho-jin as Kang Sang-mo / Lord Kang

Chairman of SH Group and Tae-ha's grandfather.

- Son So-mang as Kang Hae-ryeong / Lady Ma-cheon

Chairman Kang's youngest daughter and Tae-ha's aunt.

- Jung Si-yul as Lee Seo-jun

Hae-ryeong's son.

==== SH employees ====
- Lee Jun-hyeok as Hwang Myeong-su / Hwang Deok-gu

Director of SH Seoul and Hye-suk's right-hand man.

- Kwon Ah-reum as Yoo Ha-na

An assistant manager of SH Seoul's marketing team.

- Jung Shi-ah as Oh Hyun-jung

SH Seoul's marketing team leader.

- Noh Jong-hyun as Lee Seok-ju

A new member of SH Seoul's marketing team.

==== Midam ====
- Kim Yeo-jin as Park Yeon-woo's Joseon Mother / Lee Mi-dam

Representative of the hanbok brand "Midam".

- Park Yeon-woo as Do Yun-jae

Manager and chief designer of Midam.

==== Others ====
- Lee Young-jin as Cheon Myeong
  - Kim Tae-yeon as young Cheon Myeong

A mysterious guardian deity who watches over Yeon-woo.

- Oh Yu-jin as Hong Na-rae

Seong-pyo's younger sister. She is a job seeker with a positive personality, she teaches Park Yeon-woo, who came from Joseon, how to adapt to the "new Joseon".

- Kim Jung-don as Choi Hyun-wook

A talented cardiac surgery professor.

=== Extended ===
- Choi Go-yun as Secretary Choi

Min Hye-suk's secretary.

- Shin Su-hyun as Kim Ha-young

A bride who was originally supposed to contract marriage with Tae-ha.

- Nam Myeong-ryeol as Park Yeon-woo's grandfather

=== Special appearances ===
- Um Hyo-sup as Inspector Park Jae-won

Yeon-woo's father.

- Kim Do-ah as a princess / Jenny
- Kim Hyun as Court Lady Cho / May Hyun Kim
- Lee Min-woo as the king
- Lee Hyun-geol as a dress shop owner
- Ahn Gil-kang as Mr. Yoon
- Jeon Ye-seo as Yoon Am
- Nam Gyu-ri as Yoon-hee

Tae-ha's mother.

- Song Ok-sook as the queen dowager

== Original soundtrack ==
=== Part 1 ===
Released on November 25, 2023
No.	Title	Lyrics	Music	Artist	Length
1.	"If the World Separate Us" (이 생이 우릴 갈라놔도)	Yoon Da-on	Yoon Da-on; Yoon Kwae-jin	Seodo	3:25
2.	"If the World Separate Us" (이 생이 우릴 갈라놔도; Inst.)		Yoon Da-on; Yoon Kwae-jin		3:25
Total length:					6:50

=== Part 2 ===
Released on December 2, 2023
No.	Title	Lyrics	Music	Artist	Length
1.	"The Reason" (이유)	VIP	VIP	Lim Han-byul	3:40
2.	"The Reason" (이유; Inst.)		VIP		3:49
Total length:					7:20

=== Part 3 ===
Released on December 2, 2023
No.	Title	Lyrics	Music	Artist	Length
1.	"My Whole World Is You" (온 세상이 나에게)	Park Hee-soo; Lee Dong-wook (Sentiano)	Lee Dong-wook (Sentiano); Park Hee-soo	Yuju	3:35
2.	"My Whole World Is You" (온 세상이 나에게; Inst.)		Lee Dong-wook (Sentiano); Park Hee-soo		3:35
Total length:					7:10

=== Part 4 ===
Released on December 16, 2023
No.	Title	Lyrics	Music	Artist	Length
1.	"Like a Dream" (꿈처럼)	Lucky Clover (AVEC)	Lucky Clover (AVEC)	Song Ha-ye	4:09
2.	"Like a Dream" (꿈처럼; Inst.)		Lucky Clover (AVEC)		4:09
Total length:					8:18

=== Part 5 ===
Released on December 22, 2023
No.	Title	Lyrics	Music	Artist	Length
1.	"Can't Reach It" (닿을 듯 닿을 수 없구나)	Choe Han-sol; Kim Min-gi; Moon Si-on	Choe Han-sol; Kim Min-gi; Moon Si-on	Shin Ye-young	3:46
2.	"Can't Reach It" (닿을 듯 닿을 수 없구나; Inst.)		Choe Han-sol; Kim Min-gi; Moon Si-on		3:46
Total length:					7:32

=== Part 6 ===
Released on January 6, 2024
No.	Title	Lyrics	Music	Artist	Length
1.	"Dreaming for a Moment" (잠시 꿈을 꾼다 생각할게요)	Kim Seung-chan; Chae Yoon	Kim Seung-chan; Chae Yoon; Banana GaraG	Lim Sang-hyun	4:16
2.	"Dreaming for a Moment" (잠시 꿈을 꾼다 생각할게요; Inst.)		Kim Seung-chan; Chae Yoon; Banana GaraG		4:16
Total length:					8:32

== Reception ==
The Story of Park's Marriage Contract has been notably successful in Asian market according to Viu. Data shows that the series placed second in Thailand, fourth in Hong Kong and Malaysia, fifth in the Philippines and Singapore, and sixth in Indonesia from December 4 to 10, 2023. According to global OTT platform Rakuten Viki, from December 31, 2023 to January 7, 2024, the series ranked first in 47 countries, including the United States, Canada, the United Kingdom, France, and the Netherlands. It also ranked within the top 5 in 64 other countries.

=== Viewership ===
The Story of Park's Marriage Contract : South Korea viewers per episode (millions)

Season	Episode number												Average
Season	1	2	3	4	5	6	7	8	9	10	11	12	Average
1	1.001	1.192	1.154	1.241	1.359	1.791	1.561	1.598	N/A	N/A	1.528	1.741	1.257

Source: Audience measurement performed nationwide by Nielsen Korea. (Note: The average viewership numbers is calculated based on the published viewership numbers. The exact average viewership numbers is unknown due to multiple unpublished viewership numbers.)

Average TV viewership ratings
Ep.	Original broadcast date	Average audience share		
Ep.	Original broadcast date	Nielsen Korea		TNmS
Ep.	Original broadcast date	Nationwide	Seoul	Nationwide
1	November 24, 2023	5.6% (8th)	5.3% (7th)	4.8% (11th)
2	November 25, 2023	5.9% (7th)	5.8% (7th)	5.2% (9th)
3	December 1, 2023	6.7% (6th)	6.7% (4th)	5.8% (9th)
4	December 2, 2023	6.4% (5th)	6.2% (5th)	4.9% (10th)
5	December 8, 2023	7.4% (4th)	7.2% (4th)	6.5% (7th)
6	December 9, 2023	9.6% (2nd)	9.8% (2nd)	N/A
7	December 15, 2023	8.7% (3rd)	8.9% (3rd)	6.1% (9th)
8	December 16, 2023	8.0% (3rd)	7.6% (3rd)	N/A
9	December 22, 2023	7.4% (4th)	7.4%	N/A
10	December 23, 2023	7.6% (2nd)	7.1%	N/A
11	January 5, 2024	8.0% (5th)	7.8% (4th)	N/A
12	January 6, 2024	9.3% (3rd)	9.4% (2nd)	N/A
Average		7.6%	7.4%	— (Note: Due to multiple unpublished ratings, the exact average rating is unknown.)
In the table above, the blue numbers represent the lowest ratings and the red numbers represent the highest ratings.; N/A denotes ratings that were not published.

=== Accolades ===
Name of the award ceremony, year presented, category, nominee(s) of the award, and the result of the nomination
Award ceremony	Year	Category	Nominee / Work	Result	Ref.
MBC Drama Awards	2023	Best New Actress	Joo Hyun-young	Won	
MBC Drama Awards	2023	Excellence Award, Actor in a Miniseries	Bae In-hyuk	Won	
MBC Drama Awards	2023	Top Excellence Award, Actress in a Miniseries	Lee Se-young	Won	
MBC Drama Awards	2023	Best Couple Award	Bae In-hyuk and Lee Se-young	Nominated	
MBC Drama Awards	2023	Best New Actor	Yoo Seon-ho	Nominated	
MBC Drama Awards	2023	Best Supporting Actor	Jo Bok-rae	Nominated	
MBC Drama Awards	2023	Best Supporting Actress	Jin Kyung	Nominated	
MBC Drama Awards	2023	Drama of the Year	The Story of Park's Marriage Contract	Nominated	
