= Bae In-hyuk =

South Korean actor (born 1998)

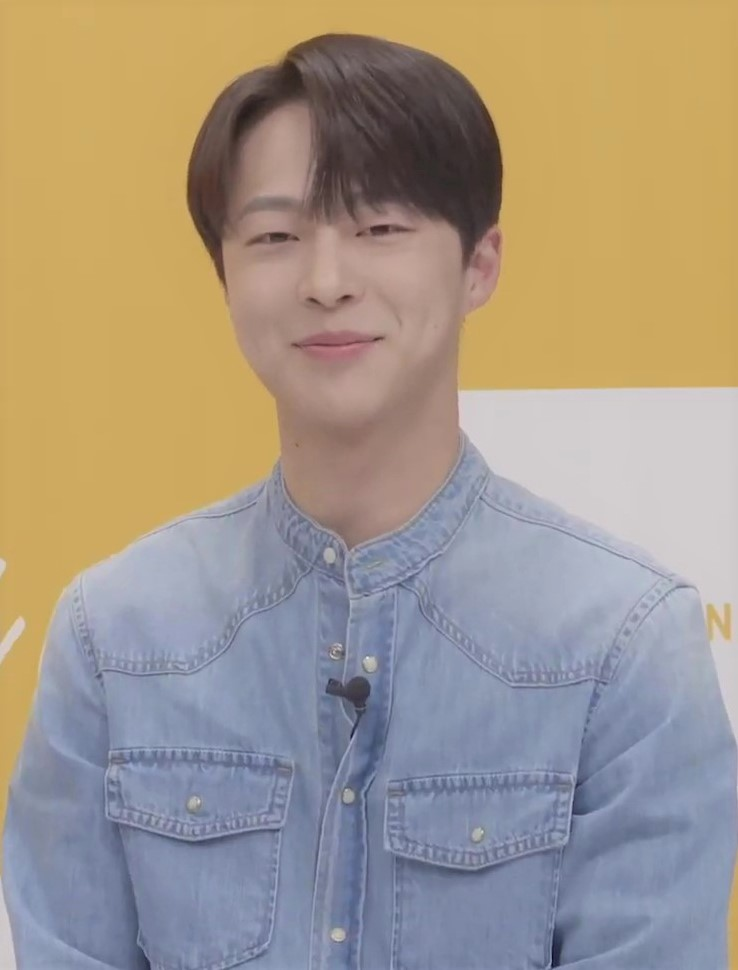
- Bae in July 2022
- Born: April 4, 1998 (age 28); Jeonju, South Korea
- Occupation: Actor
- Years active: 2019–present
- Agent: YY Entertainment

Korean name
- Hangul: 배인혁
- Hanja: 裴仁爀
- RR: Bae Inhyeok
- MR: Pae Inhyŏk

Bae In-hyuk (Korean: 배인혁; born April 4, 1998) is a South Korean actor. He is known for his roles in television dramas such as My Roommate Is a Gumiho (2021), At a Distance, Spring Is Green (2021), Cheer Up (2022), and The Story of Park's Marriage Contract (2023–2024).

== Career ==
In 2019, Bae debuted from the Web Film Love Buzz, which he starred together with Choi Ji-hui and Lee Han-ik. Later the same year, Bae joined the web drama When You Love Yourself 2, Triple Fling Season 2, Teacher, Would You Like to Date Me?, and Kiss Scene in Yeonnamdong.

In 2020, Bae joined the web dramas XX and Kiss Goblin. Later, Bae made his small screen debut in the KBS drama Men Are Men and made a short appearance in the JTBC drama Was It Love?. and Bae joined the MBC drama The Spies Who Loved Me, and earned him a nomination for Best New Actor at the 2020 MBC Drama Awards.

In 2021, Bae participated in the tvN drama My Roommate Is a Gumiho. Bae later joined the KBS drama At A Distance, Spring Is Green. Later in July, Bae starred in the SBS drama Why Her, which aired in June 2022.

In 2022, he starred in the SBS drama Cheer Up along with Han Ji-hyun, marking his first leading role. In October, the same month, he appeared in a cameo role as the son of actress Kim Hye-soo in the tvN drama Under The Queen's Umbrella.

On June 24, 2023, Bae has departed from UU Company and has signed with YY Entertainment. Bae starred in the TvN romantic-comedy series Our Universe in 2026 opposite Roh Jeong-eui. He played Seon Tae-hyung, a photography assistant who unexpectedly became a guardian to his brother's toddler son.

== Filmography ==
=== Film ===
Year	Title	Role	Notes	Ref.
2019	Love Buzz	Park Seung-jun	Web film	
2022	Ditto	Kim Eun-seong		
TBA	Dochabi	Crown Prince Yeolhwagun	Netflix film	

=== Television series ===
Year	Title	Role	Notes	Ref.
2020	Men Are Men	teenage Hwang Ji-woo	Cameo (Episode 4)	
2020	Was It Love?	Novel swordsman	Cameo (Episode 1–2)	
2020	The Spies Who Loved Me	Kim Young-goo		
2021	My Roommate Is a Gumiho	Gye Sun-woo		
2021	At a Distance, Spring Is Green	Nam Soo-hyun		
2022	Why Her	Choi Yoon-sang		
2022	Cheer Up	Park Jung-woo		
2022	Under the Queen's Umbrella	Crown Prince	Special appearance	
2023–2024	The Story of Park's Marriage Contract	Kang Tae-ha		
2024–2025	Check-in Hanyang	Prince Mu Yeong / Lee Eun-ho / Lee Eun		
2026	The Judge Returns	Kim Sang-jin	Special appearance	
2026	Our Universe	Seon Tae-hyung		

=== Web series ===
Year	Title	Role	Ref.
2019	When You Love Yourself 2	Ji-ho	
2019	Triple Fling Season 2	Shin Jeong-woo	
2019	Teacher, Would You Like to Date Me?	Choi Jin-woo	
2019	Kiss Scene in Yeonnamdong	Han Yoon-woo	
2020	XX	Park Dan-hee / Danny	
2020	Kiss Goblin	Ban-sook / Kim Geon-woo	

=== Television shows ===
Year	Title	Role	Ref.
2023	Brother Ramyeon	Cast member	

=== Music video appearances ===
Year	Song title	Artist	Ref.
2019	"To Be Honest"	Kim Na-young	
2019	"If We Never Met"	Banhana	
2019	"Goodbye List"	Kim Na-young (ft. Yang Da-il)	
2021	"Confession" (고백 프로젝트)	Jang Beom-june (ft.10cm)	

== Discography ==
=== Singles ===
Title	Year	Album
"Height" (높이) (with Han Ji-hyun, Kim Hyun-jin, and Jang Gyu-ri)	2022	Cheer Up OST

== Awards and nominations ==
Name of the award ceremony, year presented, category, nominee of the award, and the result of the nomination
Award ceremony	Year	Category	Nominee / Work	Result	Ref.
Blue Dragon Series Awards	2023	Best New Actor	Cheer Up	Nominated	
Brand of the Year Awards	2021	Best New Actor	Bae In-hyuk	Nominated	
MBC Drama Awards	2020	Best New Actor	The Spies Who Loved Me	Nominated	
MBC Drama Awards	2023	Excellence Award, Actor in a Miniseries	The Story of Park's Marriage Contract	Won	
MBC Drama Awards	2023	Best Couple Award	Bae In-hyuk (with Lee Se-young); The Story of Park's Marriage Contract	Nominated	
SBS Drama Awards	2022	Excellence Award, Actor in a Miniseries Romance/Comedy Drama	Cheer Up	Nominated	
SBS Drama Awards	2022	Best New Actor	Cheer Up and Why Her	Won	
SBS Drama Awards	2022	Best Supporting Team	Cheer Up	Won	
SBS Drama Awards	2022	Best Supporting Team	Why Her	Nominated	
SBS Drama Awards	2022	Best Couple Award	Bae In-hyuk (with Han Ji-hyun); Cheer Up	Nominated	
