= Jinxed at First =

2022 South Korean television series

- Promotional poster
- Hangul: 징크스의 연인
- Lit.: Jinx's Lover
- RR: Jingkeuseuui yeonin
- MR: Chingk'ŭsŭŭi yŏnin
- Genre: Fantasy; Romance
- Based on: Jinx's Lover by Han Ji-hye and Gu Seul
- Written by: Jang Yoon-mi
- Directed by: Yoon Sang-ho
- Starring: Seohyun; Na In-woo; Jun Kwang-ryul; Yoon Ji-hye
- Music by: Park Se-joon
- Country of origin: South Korea
- Original language: Korean
- No. of episodes: 16

Production
- Executive producers: Kun Ji-hong; Choi Jae-sun
- Producers: Joo Yeon-jung; Kim Hye-jeong; Oh Hyung-il
- Production company: Victory Contents

Original release
- Network: KBS2
- Release: June 15 – August 4, 2022

Jinxed at First (Korean: 징크스의 연인) is a South Korean television series starring Seohyun, Na In-woo, Jun Kwang-ryul, and Yoon Ji-hye. Based on the Kakao webtoon written by Han Ji-hye, and illustrated by Goo Seul. It aired on KBS2 from June 15, to August 4, 2022, every Wednesday and Thursday at 21:50 (KST) for 16 episodes. It is also available for streaming on iQIYI in selected regions.

== Synopsis ==
Jinxed at First tells the story of Gong Soo-kwang (Na In-woo), who is a bright young man who graduated from Korea University, but poor and famous for being unlucky, meets Lee Seul-bi (Seohyun), a girl who can see the future of everyone she touches. Seul-bi and her mother live in a secret room at the Sam Jung family's house. One day, Seon Min-joon's (Sam Jung's son) friends visit his house. That's when a miracle happened where the door that locked Seul-bi and her mother opened, the curious Seul-bi came out and met Soo-kwang. Seul-bi followed Soo-kwang who came home from Sam Jung's house to Soo-kwang's house. Since then Soo-kwang's life has changed drastically.

== Cast ==
=== Main ===
- Seohyun as Lee Seul-bi
- Na In-woo as Gong Soo-kwang / Go Myung-sung
- Jun Kwang-ryul as Seon Sam-joong
- Yoon Ji-hye as Lee Mi-soo

==== People related to Keumhwa Group ====
- Ki Do-hoon as Seon Min-joon
- Cha Kwang-soo as Seon Il-joong
- Choi Jung-woo as Seon Dong-shik
- Jung Wook as Secretary Cha
- Jung In-gyeom as Seon Joo-cheol

==== Seodong Market ====
- Woo Hyun as President Park / Park Seong-deok
- Hong Seok-cheon as President Hong / Hong Seok-ki
- Hwang Young-hee as Mrs. Bang
- Lee Seon-jeong as Oh Eun-jeong
- Kim Hyun-bin as Oh Eun-soo
- Hwang Seok-jeong as Yoon Yi-young, owner of Smile Fisheries
- Kim Dong-young as Chief Wang
- Park Sang-won as Pi Dae-shik
- Jang Yoon-seo as Jang Young-woo
- Kang Hak-soo as Mr. Jang
- Yoon Seo-jeong as Young Woo-une

==== Other ====
- Lee Ho-jung as Jo Jang-kyung
- Cho Han-gyeol as Jo Jang-geun
- Yoon Yoo-sun as Su Kwang-mo / Gong Soo-kwang's mother
- Yoo Ha-bok as Uncle's Go
- Kim Nan-hee as Ms.Min
- Lee Hoon as Secretary Jeong / Jeong Bi-seo / Jeong Hyeon-tae

=== Extended ===
- Kim Bo-yeon as Eun Ok-jin

=== Special appearance ===
- Kim Jung-tae as Kang Ho-jae, husband of the owner of Smile Fisheries
- Choi Yu-hwa

== Production ==
Filming began in August 2021 and concluded in December 2021.

== Original soundtrack ==
=== Part 1 ===
Released on June 15, 2022
No.	Title	Lyrics	Music	Artist	Length
1.	"The Memory of Wind" (기억을 실어 온 바람)	Han Jun	Seo Jae-ha; Kim Young-seong	Xia	4:03
2.	"The Memory of Wind" (기억을 실어 온 바람; Inst.)		Seo Jae-ha; Kim Young-seong		4:03
Total length:					8:06

=== Part 2 ===
Released on June 22, 2022
No.	Title	Lyrics	Music	Artist	Length
1.	"Milky Way"	Gang Yang-mal; Inan	Gang Yang-mal; Inan	Seohyun	2:56
2.	"Milky Way" (Inst.)		Gang Yang-mal; Inan		2:56
Total length:					5:52

=== Part 3 ===
Released on June 30, 2022
No.	Title	Lyrics	Music	Artist	Length
1.	"Please Know My Feeling" (알아채줘요)	Red Sox; Inan	Red Sox; Inan	Lee Solomon	3:34
2.	"Please Know My Feeling" (알아채줘요; Inst.)		Red Sox; Inan		3:34
Total length:					7:08

=== Part 4 ===
Released on July 6, 2022
No.	Title	Lyrics	Music	Artist	Length
1.	"A Sorrowful Memory" (애수)	Lee Young-hoon	Lee Young-hoon; norway_elephant	Ha Dong-yeon	3:33
2.	"A Sorrowful Memory" (애수; Inst.)		Lee Young-hoon; norway_elephant		3:33
Total length:					7:06

=== Part 5 ===
Released on July 13, 2022
No.	Title	Lyrics	Music	Artist	Length
1.	"You Are My Destiny" (넌 나의 기적이야)	Han-gi	Jo Young-soo; Lee Yoo-jin	Lilli Lilli	3:14
2.	"You Are My Destiny" (넌 나의 기적이야; Inst.)		Jo Young-soo; Lee Yoo-jin		3:14
Total length:					6:28

== Viewership ==
Jinxed at First : South Korea viewers per episode (thousands)

Season	Episode number																Average
Season	1	2	3	4	5	6	7	8	9	10	11	12	13	14	15	16	Average
1	659	782	681	711	N/A	677	571	597	N/A	N/A	N/A	529	N/A	N/A	N/A	495	634

Source: Audience measurement performed nationwide by Nielsen Korea. (Note: This average audience measurement is calculated based on the published figures, the exact average audience measurement is unknown due to multiple audience measurement not published.)

Average TV viewership ratings
Ep.	Original broadcast date	Average audience share	
Ep.	Original broadcast date	Nielsen Korea	
Ep.	Original broadcast date	Nationwide	Seoul
1	June 15, 2022	3.9% (19th)	4.1% (17th)
2	June 16, 2022	4.3% (10th)	4.4% (9th)
3	June 22, 2022	4.2% (16th)	4.2% (16th)
4	June 23, 2022	4.5% (13th)	4.1% (15th)
5	June 29, 2022	3.1% (24th)	N/A
6	June 30, 2022	4.3% (15th)	4.4% (19th)
7	July 6, 2022	3.5% (19th)	3.4% (17th)
8	July 7, 2022	3.5% (21st)	3.6% (18th)
9	July 13, 2022	2.7% (26th)	N/A
10	July 14, 2022	2.6% (25th)	N/A
11	July 20, 2022	2.7% (22nd)	N/A
12	July 21, 2022	3.3% (20th)	3.2% (18th)
13	July 27, 2022	2.6% (23rd)	N/A
14	July 28, 2022	2.5% (23rd)	N/A
15	August 3, 2022	2.4% (25th)	N/A
16	August 4, 2022	3.0% (21st)	N/A
Average		3.3%	3.9% (Note: This average ratings is calculated based on the published ratings, the exact average ratings is unknown due to multiple ratings not published.)
In the table above, the blue numbers represent the lowest published ratings and the red numbers represent the highest published ratings.; N/A denotes ratings that was not released.
