= Shin Su-hyun =

South Korean actress (born 1996)

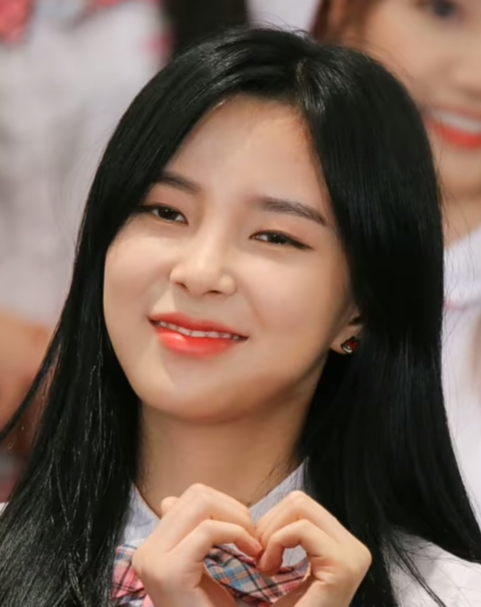
- Shin in 2018
- Born: February 27, 1996 (age 30); Ulsan, South Korea
- Occupation: Actress
- Years active: 2017–present
- Agent: Just Entertainment
- Height: 1.63 m (5 ft 4 in)

Korean name
- Hangul: 신수현
- RR: Sin Suhyeon
- MR: Sin Suhyŏn
- Website: managementrun.co.kr

Shin Su-hyun (Korean: 신수현; born February 27, 1996) is a South Korean actress. She is best known for her role in Duty After School (2023) and Study Group (2025).

== Early life and education ==
Shin was born and raised in Ulsan, South Korea. She graduated from a vocational high school in the public administration department.

Shin's mother owned Ulsan's first Chinese language school. Shin studied abroad in Harbin, China, for 2 years to obtain a Chinese language certificate.

== Career ==
In January 2019, Shin first appeared under Sublime Artist Agency. She made her acting debut in a television series with the drama Woman of 9.9 Billion as Ji Ha-na.

In January 2025, Shin signed an exclusive contract with Management Run.

On September 9, 2026, Shin signed an exclusive contract with Just Entertainment.

== Filmography ==
=== Films ===
Key
†	Denotes films that have not yet been released

Year	Title	Role	Ref.
2023	Usury Academy	Ko Shin-ji	
TBA	Pink Box †	Hae-joo	

=== Television series ===
Key
†	Denotes television productions that have not yet been released

Year	Title	Role	Notes	Ref.
2019	Woman of 9.9 Billion	Ji Ha-na		
2021	At a Distance, Spring Is Green	Park Hye-ji		
2023	Duty After School	Cha So-yeon		
2023–2024	The Story of Park's Marriage Contract	Kim Ha-young		
2024	My Sweet Mobster	Officer Song		
2025	Our Golden Days	Lee Soo-bin		
2025	Ms. Incognito	Herself	Cameo	
2025–present	Study Group	Lee Ji-woo	Season 1–present	
2025	Cashero	Lee Su-eun		
2026	Portraits of Delusion †	TBA		

=== Web series ===
Year	Title	Role	Notes	Ref.
2019	The Reason I Can't Help But Like You	Min-ji		
2020	Pop Out Boy!	Matilda	Cameo	
2025	Secret Playlist	Se-a	Special appearance	

=== Television shows ===
Year	Title	Role	Notes	Ref.
2017	Mix Nine	Contestant	Finished 59th	
2018	Produce 48	Contestant	Finished 61st	

=== Music video appearances ===
Year	Song title	Artist	Ref.
2019	"Snowflake"	Ovan, Vinxen	
2020	"The Sound of Rain"	Yoon Do-hyun	
2021	"Magnetic" (feat. Jackson Wang)	Rain	
2021	"Side by Side"	The8	

== Theater ==
Year	Title	Role	Notes	Ref.
2020	A Man's Romance	Yeon-hee		

== Awards and nominations ==
Name of the award ceremony, year presented, category, nominee of the award, and the result of the nomination
Award ceremony	Year	Category	Nominee / Work	Result	Ref.
Asia Model Awards	2023	Rising Star Award (Actor)	Duty After School, The Story of Park's Marriage Contract	Won	
Grimae Awards	2020	Best New Actor/Actress	Woman of 9.9 Billion	Won	
