= Na In-woo =

South Korean actor (born 1994)

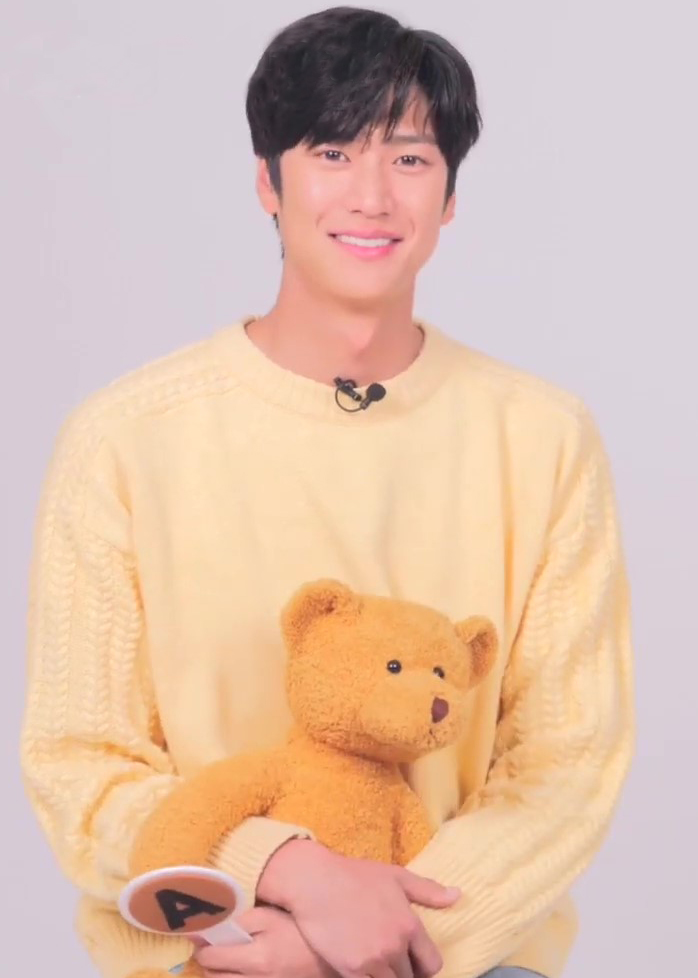
- Na in 2022
- Born: Na Jong-chan; September 17, 1994 (age 32); Gwangju, South Korea
- Education: Dankook University – Performing Arts
- Occupation: Actor
- Years active: 2013–present
- Agent: Hanada Company

Korean name
- Hangul: 나종찬
- Hanja: 羅鐘贊
- RR: Na Jongchan
- MR: Na Chongch'an

Stage name
- Hangul: 나인우
- Hanja: 羅人友
- RR: Na Inu
- MR: Na Inu
- Website: nainwoo.bstage.in

Na Jong-chan (Korean: 나종찬; born September 17, 1994), better known by his stage name Na In-woo (나인우), is a South Korean actor. He is best known for his roles in Mr. Queen (2020–2021), River Where the Moon Rises (2021), Marry My Husband (2024), and Motel California (2025). He has been a cast member of the variety show 2 Days & 1 Night since 2022.

== Career ==
=== 2013–2019: Debut and early career ===
Na made his debut in 2013 through the musical Bachelor's Vegetable Store.

In 2014, Na appeared in the SBS weekend drama Glorious Day, making a slight appearance.

In 2015, Na made his official debut in the TV drama Shine or Go Crazy followed by the drama My Mom, earning it a nomination at the awards ceremony, 2015 MBC Drama Awards for Best New Actor category. In the same year Na starred in the film Twenty, playing the role of Dong Won, Dongwoo's younger brother, played by Lee Jun-ho.

In 2016, Na starred in the web drama Spark. In the same year, Na appeared in an episode of Cinderella with Four Knights . Na also appeared in the daily drama Golden Pouch aired on MBC. In the same year, Na appeared in the Film The Car Crash : Hit by Dongho.

In 2018, Na appeared in season 1's web drama It's Okay to be Sensitive with Kim Young-dae.

In 2019, Na appeared in the MBN drama Best Chicken. Na later appeared in two weeks' episodes of Home for Summer, a KBS1 daily drama, and then became a regular of its subsequent series Unasked Family. Na also appeared in the web drama Yeonnam Family which aired on Olleh TV. In 2019, Na changed his stage name from Na Jong-chan to Na In-woo.

=== 2020–present: Career breakthrough and lead roles ===
In 2020, Na participated in the drama Mystic Pop-up Bar which aired on JTBC. Later the same year, Na joined the tvN historical drama Mr. Queen. The drama was a success, becoming the 7th highest-rated drama in Korean cable television history and boosting him into international fame.

In 2021, Na was confirmed to star in the movie Her Bucket List with Kim So-hye. In the same month, Na was confirmed for a cameo appearance in the drama At a Distance, Spring Is Green . Later in March 2021, Na joined the KBS2 historical drama River Where the Moon Rises as its male lead from the 6th episode, replacing Ji Soo who dropped out from the series following bullying allegations made against him. Despite the last-minute substitutions and casting situations in the ongoing drama, Na's acting and chemistry with lead actress Kim So-hyun were well received by the audience. As Na's first lead role, Na was nominated at the 57th Baeksang Arts Awards in the Best New Actor – Television category.

In May 2021, Na was confirmed as the male lead in the drama Jinxed at First with Seohyun. In July, he was selected as the MC of the web music program OUTNOW Unlimited (Note: Outnow Unlimited is a show for idol's comebacks.) airing on Playlist, Naver Now.

In January 2022, Na became a fixed cast member of the season 4 of KBS2 reality show 2 Days & 1 Night.

In July 2023, Na starred as the male lead in the crime drama Longing for You, portraying a police officer who sought revenge for his brother in his quest to capture a serial killer.

In January 2024, Na appeared as the male lead for the fantasy revenge melodrama Marry My Husband alongside Park Min-young (as Kang Ji-won), where he portrays Yoo Ji-hyuk, the marketing manager of U&K Food and Kang Ji-won's biggest ally in her revenge.

On January 25, 2024, Na's agency released a statement that the exclusive contract between Na and the agency was terminated on January 18 and that Na had left Cube.

== Personal life ==
=== Military service ===
In December 2024, Na's agency confirmed that he had been classified Grade 4 and assigned to supplementary service as a prospective social service worker. After remaining unsummoned for three years, he was transferred to wartime labor service under the long-term waiting provision.

Under this classification, he is exempt from mandatory military service during peacetime but remains subject to mobilization during wartime or an equivalent national emergency.

== Discography ==
=== Soundtrack appearances ===
Title	Year	Album
"May I Love" (사랑하고 싶어요)	2021	Her Bucket List OST

== Filmography ==
=== Film ===
Year	Title	Role	Notes	Ref.
2015	Twenty	Dong-won		
2016	The Car Crash : Hit by Dongho	Ko Dong-ho		
2019	The Faceless Boss	Boy 1		
2021	Her Bucket List	Kang Han-sol	Kakao TV Film	
2022	Ditto	Young-ji		

=== Television series ===
Year	Title	Role	Notes	Ref.
2014	Glorious Day	Seo Min-sik (young)		
2015	Shine or Go Crazy	Se-won		
2015	This Is My Love	Choi Jae Ho (young)		
2015	My Mom	Park Dae-ryong		
2016	Cinderella with Four Knights	Jun-soo	Cameo (Episode 12)	
2016–2017	Golden Pouch	Yoon Ji-sang		
2019	Yeonnam Family	Yoo Gwon		
2019	Home for Summer	Jang Won-jun	Episode 48–59	
2019–2020	Best Chicken	Lee Jin-sang		
2019–2020	Unasked Family	Nam Yi-nam / Kim Hyun		
2020	Mystic Pop-up Bar	Kim Won-hyung		
2020–2021	Mr. Queen	Kim Byeong-in		
2021	River Where the Moon Rises (Note: Replacing Ji Soo after the actor was dropped from the series due to bullying allegations.)	On Dal		
2021	At a Distance, Spring Is Green	Yeo Joon-wan	Cameo	
2022	Cleaning Up	Lee Doo-yeong		
2022	Jinxed at First	Gong Soo-kwang / Go Myung-sung		
2022	The Golden Spoon	Han Sung-hoon	Cameo (episode 15–16)	
2023	Longing for You	Oh Jin-seong / Oh Jin-sang		
2024	Marry My Husband	Yoo Ji-hyuk		
2025	Motel California	Cheon Yeon-su		
2025	Hatsukoi DOGs	Woo Seo-ha		

=== Television shows ===
Year	Title	Role	Notes	Ref.
2022–2024	2 Days & 1 Night Season 4	Cast Member	Episode 111 – 236	

=== Web series ===
Year	Title	Role	Ref.
2016	Spark	Yoon Ga-on	
2018	It's Okay to be Sensitive	Park Ji-ho	
2021	Underground Heaven	special appearance	

=== Web show ===
Year	Title	Role	Ref.
2021	#OUTNOW Unlimited	Host	
2022	Today, To You	Narrator	

=== Hosting ===
Year	Title	Notes	Ref.
2022	2022 KBS Song Festival	with Kim Shin-young and Jang Won-young	

== Musical ==
Year	Title	Role	Ref.
2013–2014	Bachelor's Vegetable Store	Son Ji-hwan	

== Awards and nominations ==
Name of the award ceremony, year presented, category, nominee of the award, and the result of the nomination
Award ceremony	Year	Category	Nominee / Work	Result	Ref.
Asia Artist Awards	2021	New Wave Award – Actor	Na In-woo	Won	
Asia Artist Awards	2022	Popularity Award – Actor	Na In-woo	Nominated	
Asia Artist Awards	2022	AAA Emotive – Actor	Na In-woo	Won	
Baeksang Arts Awards	2021	Best New Actor – Television	River Where the Moon Rises	Nominated	
Brand of the Year Awards	2021	Rising Star Actor	Na In-woo	Nominated	
KBS Drama Awards	2021	Best New Actor	River Where The Moon Rises	Won	
KBS Drama Awards	2021	Best Couple Award	Na In-woo (with Kim So-hyun); River Where the Moon Rises	Won	
KBS Drama Awards	2022	Excellence Award, Actor in a Miniseries	Jinxed at First	Nominated	
KBS Drama Awards	2022	Popularity Award, Actor	Jinxed at First	Nominated	
KBS Drama Awards	2022	Best Couple Award	Na In-woo (with Seohyun); Jinxed at First	Won	
KBS Entertainment Awards	2022	Rookie Award in Show and Variety Category	2 Days & 1 Night 4	Won	
KBS Entertainment Awards	2023	Excellence Award in Show and Variety Category	2 Days & 1 Night 4	Nominated	
KBS Entertainment Awards	2023	Entertainer of the Year	2 Days & 1 Night 4	Won	
KBS Entertainment Awards	2023	Grand Prize (Daesang)	2 Days & 1 Night 4	Won	
K-Model Awards with AMF GLOBAL	2021	Popular Culture Popularity Award – Actor	Na In-woo	Won	
Korea Broadcasting Awards	2021	Popularity Award	River Where the Moon Rises	Nominated	
MBC Drama Awards	2015	Best New Actor in a Serial Drama	Mom	Nominated	
MBC Drama Awards	2025	Excellence Award, Actor in a Miniseries	Motel California	Won	
