= Han Ji-hyun =

South Korean actress (born 1996)

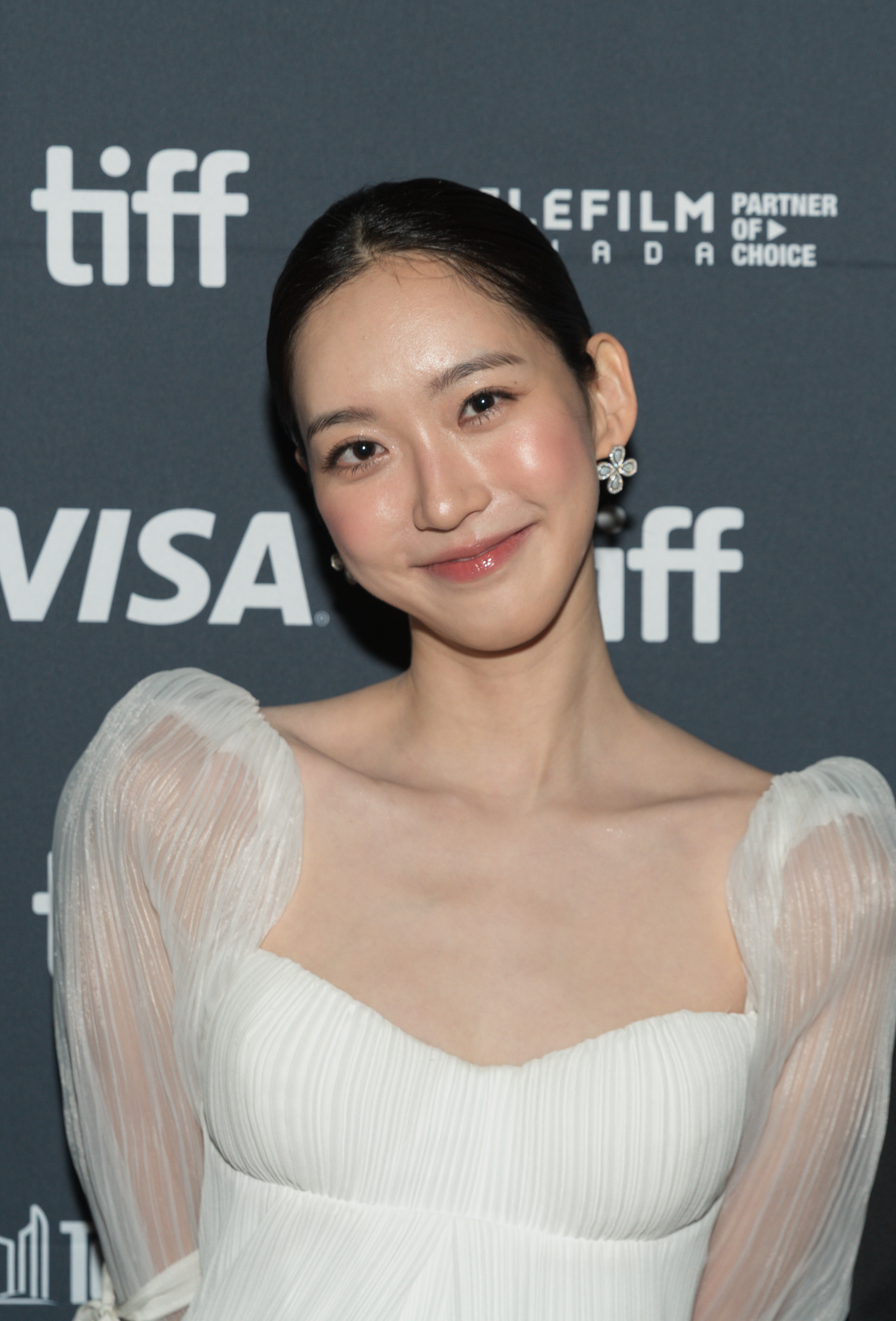
- Han in February 2023
- Born: March 21, 1996 (age 30); Seoul, South Korea
- Education: Korea National University of Arts (Department of Acting)
- Occupations: Actress; model
- Years active: 2017–present
- Agent: Chorokbaem Entertainment

Korean name
- Hangul: 한지현
- RR: Han Jihyeon
- MR: Han Chihyŏn
- Website: chorokbaement.com

Han Ji-hyun (Korean: 한지현; born March 21, 1996) is a South Korean actress and model. She began her career as a model in middle school before transitioning to acting in high school. Han made her acting debut in the web series Soul Driver (2017) and gained attention for her roles in Today's Taromance (2018) and What a Wonderful World (2019). Han rose to prominence with her role as Joo Seok-kyung in the SBS series The Penthouse: War in Life (2020–2021), and has since taken on leading roles in television, including Cheer Up (2022), and No Gain No Love (2024).

== Early life and education ==
Han was born on March 21, 1996, in Seoul, South Korea. She has a younger twin brother named Han Seung-soo who was born two minutes later and is a model. Han attends the Korea National University of Arts under the Department of Acting. Prior to her admission, she was known to have passed the university entrance exams for Department of Acting for other universities such as Konkuk University, Dongguk University, Seoul Institute of the Arts, Sungkyunkwan University, Sejong University, and Chung-Ang University.

== Career ==
=== 2017–2019: Early career ===
Han began her career as a model while she was still in middle school, later pursuing acting during high school. On February 24, 2017, it was announced that Han had signed with SBD Entertainment.

Han made her debut in 2017 with the web series Soul Driver, portraying the supporting role of Jin-hui.

In 2018, Han starred in YouTube's web series Today's Taromance, playing the supporting role of Yoo In-jeong.

In March 2019, Han starred in YouTube's web series What a Wonderful World, portraying the lead role of Jo Ah-yeong. Two months later, she made her television debut in JTBC's The Wind Blows, playing the supporting role of Lee Sun-kyung.

=== 2020–present: Rise in popularity and leading roles ===
In October 2020, Han gained recognition for her performance as Joo Seok-kyung in SBS's television series The Penthouse: War in Life, earning the Best New Actress award at the 2021 SBS Drama Awards.

In January 2021, Han made her film debut in I Bet Everything, portraying the supporting role of Kang Seon-mi. Four months later, she starred in the film Seo Bok, playing a convenience store student in a bit part.

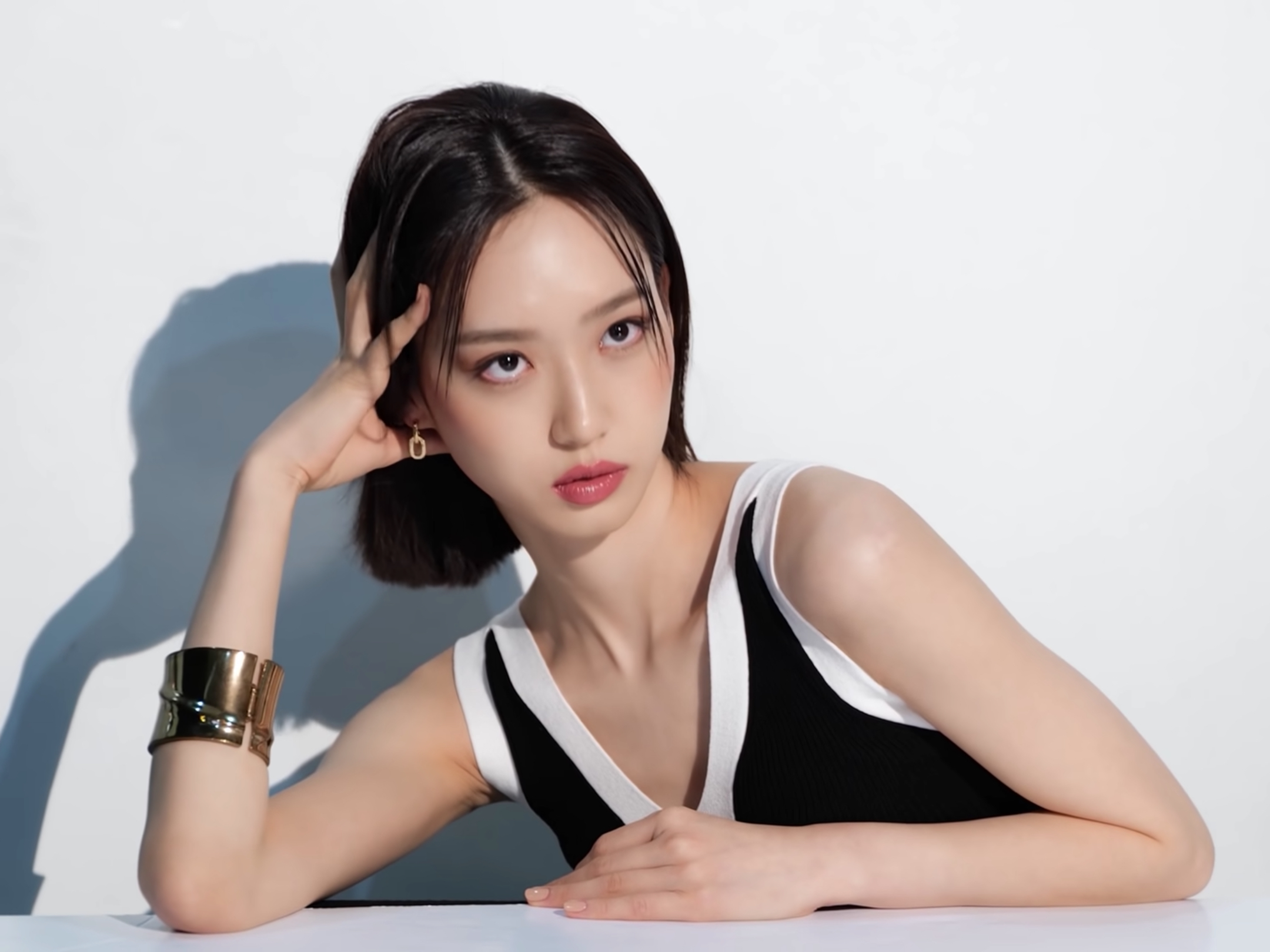
Han for Marie Claire Korea in May 2021

In October 2022, Han starred in SBS's television series Cheer Up, taking on the lead role of Do Hae-yi.

In August 2024, Han starred in tvN's television series No Gain No Love, playing the lead role of Nam Ja-yeon, a web novelist who uses the pen name Yeon Bo-ra. In October 2024, she starred in TVING's web series Spice Up Our Love, portraying the lead role of Seo Yeon-seo. In the same month, she was announced to star in the upcoming film Sisterhood, playing the lead role of Ryu Mi-jee. In November 2024, she starred in KBS's television series Face Me, taking on the lead role of Lee Min-hyeong.

In March 2025, Han starred in Netflix's film Revelations, playing the supporting role of Lee Yeon-joo. The following month, it was announced that she had signed with Chorokbaem Entertainment after her contract with SBD Entertainment expired in March 2025. In August 2025, she was announced to star in the upcoming film Made in Itaewon, playing the lead role of Kim Ji-won. The following month, she starred in the film The Ugly, playing the supporting role of Kim Su-jin. In October 2025, she was announced to star in MBC's upcoming television series In Your Brilliant Season, playing the supporting of Song Ha-young. The following month, she was announced to star in KBS's television film Love: Track – First Love is a Wired Earphone, playing the lead role of Han Young-seo.

== Filmography ==
Key
†	Denotes films or TV productions that have not yet been released

=== Film ===
Film appearances
Year	Title	Role	Notes	Ref.
2021	I Bet Everything	Kang Seon-mi		
2021	Seo Bok	Student at convenience store	Bit part	
2025	Revelations	Lee Yeon-joo		
2025	The Ugly	Kim Su-jin		
2025	Love: Track – First Love is a Wired Earphone	Han Young-seo	Television film	
2025	Sisterhood	Ryu Mi-jee		
TBA	Made in Itaewon†	Kim Ji-won		

=== Television series ===
Television series appearances
Year	Title	Role	Notes	Ref.
2019	The Wind Blows	Lee Sun-kyung		
2020–2021	The Penthouse: War in Life	Joo Seok-kyung	Season 1–3	
2022	Cheer Up	Do Hae-yi		
2024	No Gain No Love	Nam Ja-yeon / Yeon Bo-ra		
2024	Face Me	Lee Min-hyeong		
2026	In Your Radiant Season	Song Ha-young		

=== Web series ===
Web series appearances
Year	Title	Role	Notes	Ref.
2017	Soul Driver	Jin-hui		
2018	Today's Taromance	Yoo In-jeong		
2019	What a Wonderful World	Jo Ah-yeong		
2024	Spice Up Our Love	Seo Yeon-seo	No Gain No Love's spin-off	

=== Television shows ===
Year	Title	Role	Notes	Ref.
2026	Iron Girls	Cast member	Season 3	

=== Music video appearances ===
Year	Song title	Artist	Notes	Ref.
2025	"Asadal" (아사달)	Song Ga-in		

== Discography ==
=== Soundtrack appearances ===
List of soundtrack appearances, showing year released, selected chart positions, and name of the album
Title	Year	Peak chart positions	Album
Title	Year	KOR DL	Album
"High" (높이) (as Theia with Bae In-hyuk, Kim Hyun-jin, and Jang Gyu-ri)	2022	132	Cheer Up OST Part 10

== Awards and nominations ==
Name of the award ceremony, year presented, category, nominee of the award, and the result of the nomination
Award ceremony	Year	Category	Nominee / Work	Result	Ref.
Blue Dragon Series Awards	2023	Best New Actress	Cheer Up	Nominated	
Brand Customer Loyalty Award	2021	Best Female Rookie Actor	Han Ji-hyun	Won	
Brand of the Year Awards	2021	Best New Actress	Han Ji-hyun	Won	
SBS Drama Awards	2021	Best New Actress	The Penthouse: War in Life 2 and 3	Won	
SBS Drama Awards	2022	Best Supporting Team	Cheer Up	Won	
SBS Drama Awards	2022	Best Couple Award	Han Ji-hyun (with Bae In-hyuk); Cheer Up	Nominated	
SBS Drama Awards	2022	Top Excellence Award, Actress in a Miniseries Romance/Comedy Drama	Cheer Up	Nominated	
