= Yeollyeo =

Korean term meaning "virtuous woman"

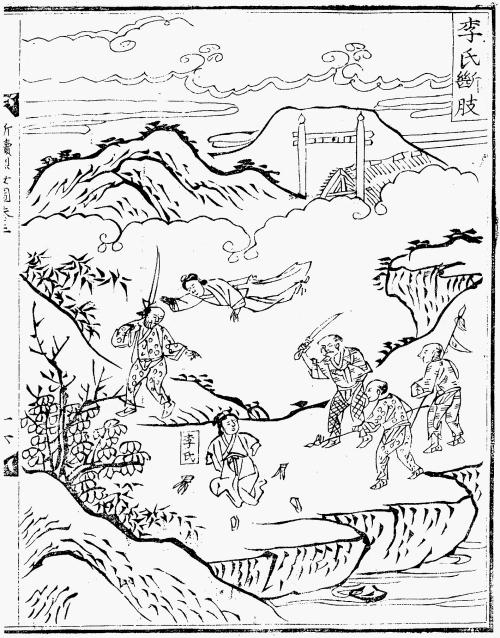
- "virtuous woman" guarding her chastity

Korean name
- Hangul: 열녀
- Hanja: 烈女
- RR: yeollyeo
- MR: yŏllyŏ

Alternate name
- Hangul: 열부
- Hanja: 烈婦
- RR: yeolbu
- MR: yŏlbu

Yeollyeo (Korean: 열녀; Hanja: 烈女), also called yeolbu (열부; 烈婦), is defined as 'virtuous woman' during the Joseon dynasty of Korea.

Joseon was a neo-Confucian society with every aspect of life governed by neo-Confucian ethics. Women were educated to be filial to their parents and in-laws, loyal to their husbands; to obey their father before marriage, to obey their husband during marriage, and to obey their sons in widowhood.

The 1485 revision of Gyeongguk Daejeon, a Joseon code of law included a "prohibition of remarriage of widows", and specified penalties for widows who remarried, prohibiting the sons and grandsons of such a marriage from participating in the civil service exams, effectively banning them from holding public or governmental posts. Widows who remarried could be sentenced to death.

The saying 'A loyal subject does not serve two kings and a virtuous woman does not serve two husbands' dates back to at least China's Warring States Period (c 475-221 BCE), and is interpreted to mean that a virtuous woman maintained her chastity not only during her marriage, but after the death of her husband.

A woman's chastity and loyalty to her spouse were considered so important that the government gave awards called yeollyeo to those who led an exemplary life by remaining loyal to their late husbands. Originally intended to set a good example, the award created a situation which got worse in late Joseon, where widows would kill themselves in order to be acknowledged as 'virtuous women', a title that brought honour to both sides of the family. It reached a point where a betrothed woman would commit suicide if her husband-to-be died before the wedding ceremony.

== In popular culture ==
Yeollyeo and its requirements are frequently a major plot component of K-drama historical romances.

- The Memorial Gate for Virtuous Women (South Korean film, 1962)
- Knight Flower (South Korean TV series, 2024) Here, a noble widow is forced to be a recluse, while another widow's mother-in-law attempts to force her daughter-in-law to die by suicide, in order to win prestige and honour for the family.
- The Story of Park's Marriage Contract (South Korean TV series, 2023–2024) Here, the heroine (a widow) is murdered on her marriage night, in her mother-in-law's pursuit of the worldly assets available to women declared as "virtuous"
- Poong, the Joseon Psychiatrist (South Korean TV series, 2022–2023) The in-laws of the heroine (widowed on her marriage night) bully her into attempting suicide, and finally attempt to murder her, in order to win the rewards available to virtuous women.

Note that while the last three of these stories essentially critique the ideal of yeollyeo they also uphold the neo-Confucian ideal, in that the lead couple come to each other as virgins, with the widow never having consummated her marriage.

== See also ==
- History of women in Korea
- Society in the Joseon Dynasty
