= The King's Affection =

2021 South Korean television series

- Promotional poster
- Also known as: Attachment
- Hangul: 연모
- Lit.: Affection
- RR: Yeonmo
- MR: Yŏnmo
- Genre: Historical; Romance; Fiction; Comedy
- Created by: Ki Min-soo; Hong Seok-gu (KBS Drama division)
- Based on: Yeonmo by Lee So-young
- Written by: Han Hee-jung
- Directed by: Song Hyun-wook
- Starring: Park Eun-bin; Rowoon; Nam Yoon-su; Choi Byung-chan; Bae Yoon-kyung; Jung Chae-yeon
- Composer: Taven
- Country of origin: South Korea
- Original language: Korean
- No. of episodes: 20

Production
- Executive producers: Yoon Jae-hyuk; Han Hye-yeon; Song Min-joo; Park Chun-ho
- Producers: Ahn Chang-hyeon; Hwang Ui-kyung; Baek Sung-min
- Running time: 70 minutes
- Production companies: Story Hunter Production; Monster Union

Original release
- Network: KBS2
- Release: October 11 – December 14, 2021

The King's Affection (Korean: 연모; RR: Yeonmo), is a 2021 South Korean television series starring Park Eun-bin, Rowoon, Nam Yoon-su, Choi Byung-chan, Bae Yoon-kyung, and Jung Chae-yeon. The story is based on Lee So-young's manhwa Yeonmo. It aired on KBS2 from October 11 to December 14, 2021, every Monday and Tuesday at 21:30 (KST) for 20 episodes. It also premiered worldwide on Netflix on the same day.

The King's Affection is the first South Korean television series to win an International Emmy Award.

== Synopsis ==
The story is set during the Joseon period.

=== Dam-yi's birth ===
The plot is driven by the power-hungry Left State Councillor of Joseon, Lord Sangheon (a.k.a. Han Ki-jae). At the start of the series, he has staged a coup enabling his daughter's husband, Hyejong, to be made crown prince (later king) by killing the King's brother and the King's brother's son, Prince Dohyeon. Thus Lord Sangheon is Joseon's power behind the throne.

Lord Sangheon's daughter gives birth to twins: a boy (Lee Hwi) and a girl (Dam-yi). Believing that a boy who has shared the womb with a girl is ineligible to rule, Lord Sangheon orders that the twin birth should be kept secret and Dam-yi murdered. But instead of murdering the girl, Lord Sangheon's daughter's faithful servant Commander Yoon Hyeong-seol abandons Dam-yi outside a monastery.

=== Dam-yi's childhood ===
Later in her childhood, Dam-yi, unaware of her parentage, becomes a servant in the palace. She and the son of Chief Inspector Jung Seok-jo, Jung Ji-woon, fall in love. Dam-yi's twin brother, now the crown prince, realises that he and Dam-yi look identical, and changes places with her in order to sneak out of the palace to witness the execution of his beloved tutor, Kang Hwa-Gil (a.k.a. Ik-Sun). Kang Hwa-Gil had sought to reform Joseon's corrupt court. We later learn that he was executed through the machinations of Lord Sangheon.

Lord Sangheon realises that Dam-yi is alive and orders Chief Inspector Jung Seok-jo to murder her. In a case of mistaken identity, Jung Seok-jo unwittingly murders Crown Prince Lee Hwi while he is disguised as Dam-yi. Thus Dam-yi, whose true identity is known only to Lee Hwi's mother, his lady-in-waiting Kim, and his chief eunuch Hong, is forced to take on Lee Hwi's identity permanently.

Jung Ji-woon realises his father Jung Seok-jo's murderous ruthlessness and, in disgust, enters self-imposed exile in Ming. He becomes a renowned doctor and saves the life of Ming's Vice-Minister of Rites.

Dam-yi's mother dies young; Dam-yi's father King Hyejong then marries the daughter of the ambitious Chief State Councillor, Lord Changchun. They have a son, Grand Prince Jehyeon (a.k.a. Lee Gyeom), a potential competitor to Dam-yi for the throne. Realising the danger that Lord Sangheon poses to both his surviving children, King Hyejong seeks to build up Lord Changchun's power as a counterweight to Lord Sangheon.

Dam-yi also has an uncle and two cousins who would have been in line for the throne were it not for Lord Sangheon's treachery: the boorish Prince Changwoon and the sons of Prince Dohyeon, the scheming Prince Wonsan and the honourable Prince Jaeun (a.k.a. Lee Hyun). Prince Jaeun realises that Dam-yi is a girl, but both falls in love with her and supports her with unfailing loyalty.

=== Dam-yi as crown prince ===
The story now skips to Dam-yi's early adulthood. Still disguised as Lee Hwi, she remains crown prince of Joseon.

Learning that Ming's Vice-Minister of Rites will come to Joseon on an embassy, Lord Sangheon has Chief Inspector Jung Seok-jo force his son Jung Ji-woon to become tutor to Dam-yi, in order to take advantage of Jung Ji-woon's good relationship with the Minister. Jung Ji-woon and Prince Jaeun co-operate to help Dam-yi negotiate with the embassy.

Without Jung Ji-woon knowing Dam-yi's true identity, the two fall in love (again). Jung Ji-woon endeavours to stay close to and to protect Dam-yi hereafter, but the two believe that a relationship is impossible. Prince Jaeun realises that Jung Ji-woon and Dam-yi love each other and selflessly works for Dam-yi's happiness.

Dam-yi's cousin Prince Wonsan seeks the throne. When Prince Changwoon alienates himself from the court by his scandalous behaviour, Wonsan helps Changwoon stage his suicide, implying that Dam-yi's treatment of Wonsan is to blame. He then conspires with Lord Changchun to remove Dam-yi from the line of succession. Exiled, Dam-yi reveals her sex to Jung Ji-woon and the two briefly hope that they can live happily together in exile. However, Lord Sangheon murders King Hyejong with a distinctive poison called sonangcho; successfully frames Lord Changchun, exiling Lord Changchun, his daughter, and Grand Prince Jehyeon; and forces Dam-yi to become king by threatening to kill her half-brother and other friends.

Meanwhile, the son of Crown Prince Lee Hwi's childhood tutor, Kim Ga-on (a.k.a. Kang Eun-seo), is bent on avenging his father. After becoming an expert fighter in Joseon's army, he fakes an assassination attempt on Dam-yi in order to get a job as a bodyguard for Dam-yi, enabling him to infiltrate the palace. This enables him, one by one, to murder the people who conspired to execute his father. He aspires to murder the King himself, but when the King is murdered, Kim Ga-on realises that the real killer of his father is Lord Sangheon, and goes on to pledge allegiance to Dam-yi.

=== Dam-yi as king ===
Lord Sangheon rules as the power behind the throne, with Dam-yi as his puppet. He forces Dam-yi to marry, giving rise to the risk that Dam-yi's sex will be exposed.

However, Dam-yi plots Lord Sangheon's overthrow, hoping to abdicate in favour of her young half-brother Grand Prince Jehyeon. She gathers evidence that Lord Sangheon is building a private army. She is aided by Commander Yoon Hyeong-seol. While trying to find evidence of Lord Sangheon's plot, Commander Yoon is killed by Jung Seok-jo, but Kim Ga-on manages to bring the evidence to Dam-yi. Jung Seok-jo discovers that his son is having an affair with Dam-yi, realises that he murdered the wrong twin, and begins to regret his life of bloodshed in the service of Lord Sangheon.

Meanwhile, Prince Wonsan discovers Dam-yi's placenta and realises that the King must have been born a twin, and moreover that the king might be a woman. He dispatches Prince Changwoon to ambush Dam-yi to try to prove his theory. Prince Changwoon succeeds in cutting open Dam-yi's robe to reveal the bands around her breasts, but is beaten off by both Jung Ji-woon and Jung Seok-jo. Prince Changwoon goes on to boast in a brothel that the King is a woman. Jung Seok-jo soon murders him to keep Dam-yi's secret, but not before the rumour spreads; the rumour is exacerbated by rumours that the King is not having sex with his wife and that he is in love with Jung Ji-woon.

As matters come to a head, Prince Wonsan invites Lord Sangheon to support his bid for the throne. Eventually, realising that the puppet king is increasingly a liability to him, Lord Sangheon agrees.

Realising that her secret will soon be revealed, Dam-yi sends her lady-in-waiting Kim and her chief eunuch Hong into hiding to protect them from Lord Sangheon. As she flees, Kim explains to Jung Ji-woon that the King is in fact Jung Ji-woon's childhood love Dam-yi, and that Jung Ji-woon's father Jung Seok-jo killed Dam-yi's brother while trying to kill Dam-yi herself. This consolidates Jung Ji-woon adult love for Dam-yi.

With the help of his father, Jung Ji-woon finds the sonangcho poison in Lord Sangheon's study, providing the last piece of evidence Dam-yi needs to prosecute her grandfather for treason. Lord Sangheon is imprisoned and condemned to death, but he escapes and he and Prince Wonsan raise Lord Sangheon's army and storm the palace.

In the ensuing struggles, Grand Prince Jehyeon, Prince Wonsan, and Jung Seok-jo are all killed. Dam-yi feigns surrender to Lord Sangheon, but serves him tea laced with sonangcho poison and so kills him. To convince Lord Sangheon to drink, she drinks the tea too, but survives thanks to a medicine given to her by Jung Ji-woon.

The honourable Prince Jaeun ascends to the throne and allows Dam-yi to regain her former identity; she departs into happy exile by the sea with her beloved Jung Ji-woon.

== Cast ==
=== Main ===
- Park Eun-bin as Crown Prince Lee Hwi / Dam-yi / Yeon-seon
  - Choi Myung-bin as young Crown Prince Lee Hwi / Dam-yi / Yeon-seon

Lee Hwi is a young prince who dies due to a case of mistaken identity. Dam-yi is Lee Hwi's twin sister, who was hidden after birth; she is forced to take the title and responsibility of the Crown Prince due to her brother's death.

- Rowoon as Jung Ji-woon
  - Go Woo-rim as young Jung Ji-woon

Inspector Jung's son. He is a physician at Samgaebang, but is later hired as a Royal Tutor for Crown Prince Lee Hwi.

- Nam Yoon-su as Lee Hyun, Prince Jaeun
  - Choi Ro-woon as young Lee Hyun

Lee Hwi's paternal cousin who is soft-hearted and loyal to her. He secretly knew since his childhood that Hwi was a female but kept the secret to himself for years and continues to stand by her.

- Choi Byung-chan as Kim Ga-on / Kang Eun-seo
  - Ok Chan-yu as young Kim Ga-on / Kang Eun-seo

Lee Hwi's personal bodyguard. He was the son of the former Royal Tutor of Hwi's twin brother, who had been wrongfully executed many years prior by Lord Sangheon, and sought revenge against Hwi and the royal family, but later found out that Hwi was a woman, and remains a loyal ally to her.

- Bae Yoon-kyung as Shin So-eun

Only child of the Minister of Personnel.

- Jung Chae-yeon as Noh Ha-kyung

Youngest daughter of the Minister of Military Affairs. She falls in love with Lee Hwi, not knowing that she was a woman, and later becomes her queen when Hwi ascends to the throne. She later became devastated by the rumors that her husband was in love with Ji-woon, before Hwi eventually confides her true gender to her. With acceptance, Ha-kyung left the palace under the false excuse of having died from an illness and with her palace records erased as well, although she continues to harbour feelings for Hwi.

=== Supporting ===
- Yoon Je-moon as Han Ki-jae, Lord Sangheon

Left State Councillor and Lee Hwi's powerful maternal grandfather.

- Bae Soo-bin as Inspector Jung Seok-jo

Jung Ji-woon's father and right-hand man of Lord Sangheon.

- Lee Pil-mo as King Hyejong

Father of Dam-yi and Lee Hwi.

==== People around Lee Hwi ====
- Baek Hyun-joo as Court Lady Kim

Lee Hwi's mother figure who knows about her secret.

- Ko Kyu-pil as Eunuch Hong
  - Kim Gun as young Eunuch Hong

Close aide of Dam-yi after she took over her brother's identity, and the late Lee Hwi's childhood playmate.

- Kim Jae-cheol as Commander Yoon Hyeong-seol

King Hyejong's bodyguard who saved Dam-yi after her birth.

==== People around Jung Ji-woon ====
- Park Eun-hye as Madam Kim

Jung Ji-woon's mother.

- Jang Se-hyun as Bang Jil-geum

Worker at Samgaebang.

- Lee Soo-min as Bang Young-ji

Worker at Samgaebang.

- Heo Jung-min as Palace Guard Gu

==== Royal Family ====
- Kim Taek as Lee Jeong, Prince Wonsan
  - Kim Joon-ho as young Prince Wonsan

Lee Hyun's older brother and Lee Hwi's paternal cousin.

- Kim Seo-ha as Prince Changwoon

Lee Hwi's paternal uncle who is always causing trouble.

- Lee Il-hwa as Queen Dowager

Lee Hwi's paternal grandmother.

- Son Yeo-eun as Queen

King Hyejong's second wife, the mother of Grand Prince Jehyeon and Lee Hwi's step-mother.

- Cha Sung-jae as Lee Gyeom, Grand Prince Jehyeon

Lee Hwi's half-brother.

==== Royal Court ====
- Jung Jae-seong as Noh Hak-su

Noh Ha-kyung's father and the Minister of Military Affairs.

- Park Won-sang as Shin Young-soo

Shin So-eun's father and the Minister of Personnel who is a loyal subject of the King.

- Son Jong-hak as Lord Changchun

Chief State Councillor and the Queen's father.

==== Royal Institute ====
- Kim In-kwon as Yang Moon-soo
- Noh Sang-bo as Park Beom-du
- Kim Min-seok as Choi Man-dal

=== Others ===
- Han Chae-ah as Crown Princess Han

Lord Sangheon's daughter and the mother of Dam-yi and Lee Hwi.

- Park Ki-woong as Chief Eunuch and envoy from the Ming dynasty
  - Kim Do-won as young Chief Eunuch
- Lee Seo-hwan as Vice Minister of Rites from the Ming dynasty
- Han Sung-yun as Yu-gon

A palace maid.

- Gong Jin-seo as Jan-yi

Shin So-eun's maid.

- Kim Eun-min as Joseon-born concubine of the Ming Emperor
  - Yoon Seo-yeon as young concubine
- Jo Sung-kyu as Prince Changwoon's steward
- Kim Ki-doo as Head of the Bureau of Astrology

== Production ==
The manhwa hypothesized the existence of a fictional king between Yejong and Seongjong, but the production decided to remove any reference to real people, setting the series during the reign of a fictional king and changing the background of the male lead.

=== Casting ===
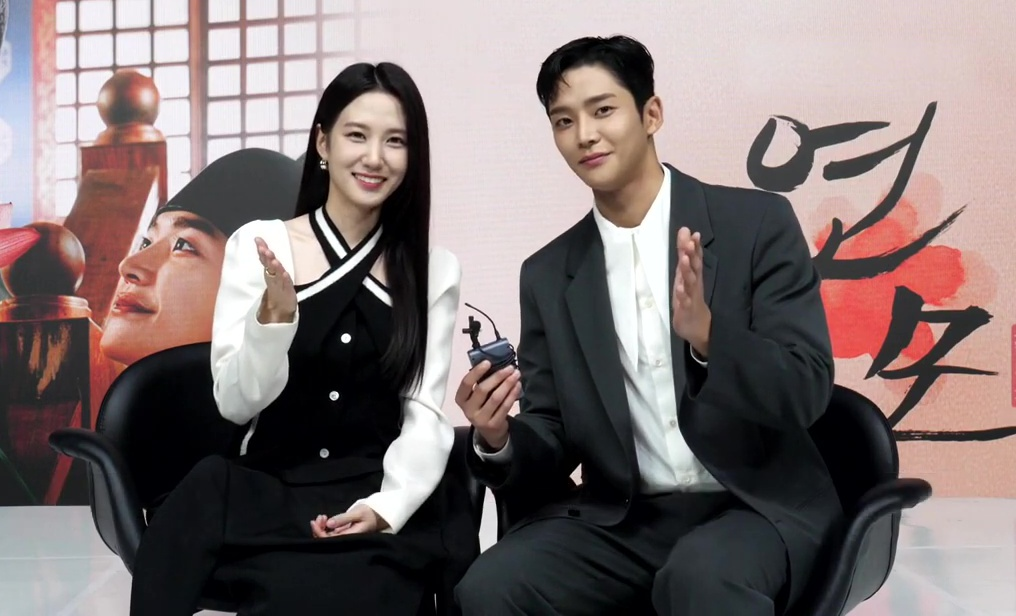
Park Eun-bin and Rowoon interviewed for the drama in October 2021.

On December 17, 2020, Ilgan Sports reported that Park Eun-bin would play the female lead in KBS's new drama The King's Affection. Earlier in the day, the actress' agency, Namoo Actors, declared that she was still considering the offer. On January 15, 2021, Ilgan Sports identified Rowoon as the male lead, but FNC Entertainment stated that for the moment he was focusing on filming She Would Never Know and nothing had been decided.

In the following months, Nam Yoon-su, Choi Byung-chan and Jung Chae-yeon joined the cast; meanwhile Park Eun-bin and Rowoon were confirmed on March 19, 2021. Nam decided to participate in the series to gain new experiences and because he had found the character of Lee Hyun unpredictable, while Rowoon because of the love story told and because he wanted to try his hand in a historical drama.

Park Eun-bin received the script for The King's Affection at a time when she was thinking about acting in a historical drama again, as the last one she filmed was Secret Door in 2014. While aware that there would be other opportunities in the future to fulfill her wish, she decided to take the role because the premise of the series was very attractive and she doubted she would have another chance to play a king. At the press conference before broadcast, Park commented that despite her taking on the role of Lee Hwi with confidence, she had had a hard time making it convincing because it was the first time a woman played a king. Instead of trying to simply disguise herself as a man, she attempted to focus on showing why Hwi had to pretend to be a male and on the moments in which she faced doubts and dangers, as her real side slips out, declaring that she wanted Hwi to be seen as a person regardless of gender. She also took riding lessons and paid attention to adjusting the tone of her voice according to the people around Hwi.

=== Filming ===
Filming began in April 2021 and ended on November 15. It was halted on July 26, 2021, as one of the production staff who participated in the July 24 filming was tested positive for COVID-19. All of the cast members and production staff were subsequently tested and went into self-quarantine on the same day. On July 27, it was announced that Park Eun-bin, Lee Pil-mo and Bae Soo-bin tested negative for COVID-19. On July 28, it was reported that Nam Yoon-su's test result was also negative, and filming resumed on the same day.

On August 6, it was revealed that filming was cancelled due to a fire that broke out a day earlier, at 21:10 KST, when the crew was filming at the Korean Folk Village in Yongin, Gyeonggi Province. The fire was extinguished by firefighters within 20 minutes.

Filming locations also include Hangae Village in Seongju County and Hanjujeongsa Temple on its summit; Gyeonggijeon Temple, its hyanggyo (provincial school) and hanok village in Jeonju, Munheon Confucian school in Seocheon County, Mungyeong Saejae provincial park in Mungyeong, Buan Cinema Theme Park, Itaesarang rock in Geochang, Manhyujeong pavilion in Andong, Gwanghalluwon garden in Namwon, and two fortresses, namely Jukjusanseong in Anseong and Sangdangsanseong in Cheongju.

== Original soundtrack ==
Singles (Part 1–7)

Part 1

Released on October 12, 2021
No.	Title	Lyrics	Music	Artist	Length
1.	"Shadow of You" (그림자 사랑)	Han Seong-ho	Lee Hyun-seung; TM	Super Junior-K.R.Y.	3:51
2.	"Shadow of You" (그림자 사랑; Inst.)		Lee Hyun-seung; TM	Super Junior-K.R.Y.	3:51
Total length:					7:42

Part 2

Released on October 19, 2021
No.	Title	Lyrics	Music	Artist	Length
1.	"One and Only" (알아요)	Han Seong-ho	Park Geun-tae; Kang Eun-kyung; Kim Do-hoon (RBW); Lee Hyun-seung; Hwang Tae-young	Lyn	4:10
2.	"One and Only" (알아요; Inst.)		Park Geun-tae; Kang Eun-kyung; Kim Do-hoon (RBW); Lee Hyun-seung; Hwang Tae-young	Lyn	4:10
Total length:					8:20

Part 3

Released on October 26, 2021
No.	Title	Lyrics	Music	Artist	Length
1.	"If I"	VIP	VIP	Baek Ji-young	3:41
2.	"If I" (Inst.)		VIP	Baek Ji-young	3:41
Total length:					7:22

Part 4

Released on November 2, 2021
No.	Title	Lyrics	Music	Artist	Length
1.	"I Believe"	Han Seung-hoon; Kim Chang-rak (Aiming); Kim Soo-bin (Aiming)	Han Seung-hoon; Kim Chang-rak (Aiming); Im Soo-hyuk (Aiming); Kang Min-hoon (Aiming)	An Da-eun	3:46
2.	"I Believe" (Inst.)		Han Seung-hoon; Kim Chang-rak (Aiming); Im Soo-hyuk (Aiming); Kang Min-hoon (Aiming)	An Da-eun	3:46
Total length:					7:32

Part 5

Released on November 9, 2021
No.	Title	Lyrics	Music	Artist	Length
1.	"Hide and Seek" (숨바꼭질)	Han Seong-ho	Han Seong-ho; Park Soo-seok; Seo Ji-eun; Moon Kim	Vromance	3:39
2.	"Hide and Seek" (숨바꼭질; Inst.)		Han Seong-ho; Park Soo-seok; Seo Ji-eun; Moon Kim	Vromance	3:39
Total length:					7:18

Part 6

Released on November 16, 2021
No.	Title	Lyrics	Music	Artist	Length
1.	"Full of You" (티가 나)	Han Seong-ho; Jxxdxn	Lee Hyun-seung; TM	Haeyoon (Cherry Bullet)	3:16
2.	"Full of You" (티가 나)	Han Seong-ho; Jxxdxn	Lee Hyun-seung; TM	Vromance	3:15
3.	"Full of You" (티가 나; Inst.)		Lee Hyun-seung; TM	Haeyoon (Cherry Bullet)	3:16
4.	"Full of You" (티가 나; Inst.)		Lee Hyun-seung; TM	Vromance	3:15
Total length:					13:02

Part 7

Released on November 23, 2021
No.	Title	Lyrics	Music	Artist	Length
1.	"No Goodbye In Love" (안녕)	Han Seong-ho; Kim Do-hoon (RBW)	Kim Do-hoon (RBW)	Rowoon (SF9)	3:16
2.	"No Goodbye In Love" (안녕; Inst.)		Kim Do-hoon (RBW)	Rowoon (SF9)	3:16
Total length:					6:32

Album

The King's Affection OST

Soundtrack album by Various artists
- Released: November 30, 2021
- Genre: K-pop
- Length: 56:27
- Language: Korean
- Labels: FNC; Kakao

Released on November 30, 2021
No.	Title	Lyrics	Music	Artist	Length
1.	"Shadow of You" (그림자 사랑)	Han Seong-ho	Lee Hyun-seung; TM	Super Junior-K.R.Y.	3:51
2.	"One and Only" (알아요)	Han Seong-ho	Park Geun-tae; Kang Eun-kyung; Kim Do-hoon (RBW); Lee Hyun-seung; Hwang Tae-young	Lyn	4:10
3.	"If I"	VIP	VIP	Baek Ji-young	3:41
4.	"I Believe"	Han Seung-hoon; Kim Chang-rak (Aiming); Kim Soo-bin (Aiming)	Han Seung-hoon; Kim Chang-rak (Aiming); Im Soo-hyuk (Aiming); Kang Min-hoon (Aiming)	An Da-eun	3:46
5.	"Hide and Seek" (숨바꼭질)	Han Seong-ho	Han Seong-ho; Park Soo-seok; Seo Ji-eun; Moon Kim	Vromance	3:39
6.	"Full of You" (티가 나)	Han Seong-ho; Jxxdxn	Lee Hyun-seung; TM	Haeyoon (Cherry Bullet)	3:16
7.	"Full of You" (티가 나)	Han Seong-ho; Jxxdxn	Lee Hyun-seung; TM	Vromance	3:15
8.	"No Goodbye In Love" (안녕)	Han Seong-ho; Kim Do-hoon (RBW)	Kim Do-hoon (RBW)	Rowoon (SF9)	3:16
9.	"The King's Affection"		Park Min-ji		2:30
10.	"Marchen"		Kang Myung-soo		2:27
11.	"Dreaming"		Kang Myung-soo		3:26
12.	"The Crown"		FARA EFFECT		2:50
13.	"EMPIRE"		Roark		2:00
14.	"Virtual Traditional Human"		Roark		1:41
15.	"Nostalgic Heart"		Park Min-ji		2:47
16.	"Lotus Blossom"		FARA EFFECT		2:56
17.	"Fate"		FARA EFFECT		4:20
18.	"King's Love Waltz"		Park Min-ji		2:36
Total length:					56:27

== Reception ==
=== Critical reception ===
Overall, The King's Affection was well received by critics, both in South Korea and abroad. Several outlets felt that it opened a new horizon in the stories of women disguised as men, and that Hwi's independence and how she repeatedly saved Ji-woon constituted a 180° shift in the gender roles of a typical romantic series, appreciating "the rare attempt" to make the female lead occupy a higher social position, instead of recounting the sad love between a high-ranking man and a woman of humble origins, and observing that the concept of the woman who pretends to be a man transcends the dimension of melodrama, extending towards the dimension of battles for values and self-affirmation, and comparing it to the struggles against prejudice fought by minorities excluded for their diversity.

Calling the drama "interesting and different" from previous series in which the female lead wore male clothes, such as Coffee Prince, Sungkyungwan Scandal or Love in the Moonlight, the Thai news agency Workpoint Today noted that the fact that the hero fell in love regardless of the other person's gender could be considered an attempt to help normalize boundless love, blurring the lines between femininity and masculinity still deeply rooted in South Korean society, and appreciated the absence of the classic scene in which the male lead wonders why he likes a person of the same sex. Through the revival of stereotypical scenes, but in which Ji-woon adopts behaviors usually attributed to female characters, and through the debates on Confucius' teachings, it also identified the desire to shatter the distinction between male and female roles particularly clear in historical series, and the conviction that traditional beliefs should no longer define sexuality. AlloCiné found that the intonation is evocative of Mulan, but observed that the series stood out for its very light plot, and narrated the sentimental wanderings of a young woman in a fundamentally patriarchal environment, calling it "feminist in more than one way". In general, critics appreciated the more open vision of love presented by the series, considering it more daring than previous historical dramas with the same concept given the greater presence of queer elements, not only in the BL relationship between Hwi and Ji-woon, but also in the GL one between Hwi and Ha-kyung.

Compliments were also directed to the aesthetics of the sets and costumes, and to the interpretations of the protagonists, especially to the performances of Choi Myung-bin in the roles of both Dam-yi and her brother Hwi as children, and to the more nuanced one by Park Eun-bin, whose complete identification with the character was considered one of the main reasons for the popularity of the series. Moreover, the drama attracted positive comments for the portrayal of youth fighting against the status quo in order to protect their rights and happiness, freely expressing, in an imaginary world, metaphors of reality and social taboos that are difficult to manage in a series set in modern times, for example the older generation's attempt to arbitrarily define and classify young people according to its own desires: in particular, Han Ki-jae's ambition to wield power by maneuvering Hwi like a puppet evoked the election campaign for the new President of South Korea and the way in which the political community incited young people to vote.

Popular culture critic Jung Deok-hyun noted, however, that while it might have been possible for a crown prince to fall in love with a eunuch, seeing Ji-woon courting Hwi was disconcerting, as, taking into account Joseon's power structure and discrimination between men and women at the time, it would have been more common to witness the opposite, considering Hwi's position of greater power; consequently, he found the dynamics between the two characters implausible, also due to the fact that Ji-woon ignored Hwi's true gender, and observed that, if the relationship had been treated with greater seriousness and foresight, it could have become a true queer drama, especially if the production decided to opt for the story of a true homosexual love. However, he noted that it was a "strangely exciting" drama, probably because of the love story that transcends hierarchy and gender, and that, despite the ridiculous situations and the low plausibility, it had managed to capture the audience by making them believe that such a story could actually take place.

On the other side, Tae Yoo-na of Hankyung found the development sloppy, characters awkward, and casting wrong, arguing that Park Eun-bin's physique and height were too small compared to Rowoon's, preventing her from expressing the dignity of a crown prince. Stephen McCarty of the South China Morning Post noted that the series could have cut some bloodshed without losing narrative strength.

The King's Affection placed sixth on NME's best Korean dramas of 2021 list.

=== Viewership ===
According to Nielsen Korea, The King's Affection debuted in South Korea with a national average share of 6.2%. Episode 6 scored the lowest ratings for the series, with a national average share of 5.5% and 4.8% in the Seoul metropolitan area, but after the conclusion of Lovers of the Red Sky, one of the competing programs of the evening, episode 7 recorded the best ratings for the drama, which reached a share of 10% with episode 13 and ended with 12,1%.

In the span of two weeks, The King's Affection entered the top 10 of Netflix's most viewed programs globally and the top 5 in Hong Kong, Indonesia, Japan, Malaysia, Philippines, Singapore, Thailand and Vietnam. Following the release of episodes 9 and 10 on November 10, it ranked eighth globally, and first among the most viewed Korean programs for three consecutive days, while on November 23 it was fourth in Netflix's Global Top 10 (Non-English), with 15.64 million hours watched.

The King's Affection : South Korea viewers per episode (millions)

Season	Episode number																				Average
Season	1	2	3	4	5	6	7	8	9	10	11	12	13	14	15	16	17	18	19	20	Average
1	1.137	1.148	1.095	0.981	0.995	0.941	1.205	1.355	1.302	1.183	1.155	1.470	1.757	1.562	1.726	1.450	1.417	1.596	1.503	2.003	1.349

Source: Audience measurement performed nationwide by Nielsen Korea.

Average TV viewership ratings
Ep.	Original broadcast date	Average audience share		
Ep.	Original broadcast date	Nielsen Korea		TNmS
Ep.	Original broadcast date	Nationwide	Seoul	Nationwide
1	October 11, 2021	6.2% (12th)	6.2% (10th)	6.8% (10th)
2	October 12, 2021	6.7% (9th)	5.9% (9th)	6.7% (10th)
3	October 18, 2021	6.5% (11th)	6.4% (9th)	6.5% (12th)
4	October 19, 2021	5.9% (13th)	5.6% (12th)	6.2% (12th)
5	October 25, 2021	5.7% (13th)	4.9% (16th)	5.6% (13th)
6	October 26, 2021	5.5% (14th)	4.8% (16th)	5.9% (14th)
7	November 1, 2021	7.0% (9th)	6.3% (10th)	7.2% (8th)
8	November 2, 2021	7.6% (6th)	7.2% (6th)	7.1% (9th)
9	November 8, 2021	7.8% (8th)	7.8% (7th)	6.8% (11th)
10	November 9, 2021	7.2% (7th)	7.0% (7th)	6.5% (11th)
11	November 15, 2021	7.1% (10th)	6.4% (12th)	6.7% (9th)
12	November 16, 2021	8.8% (4th)	8.7% (4th)	7.3% (9th)
13	November 22, 2021	10.0% (4th)	9.4% (4th)	8.5% (8th)
14	November 23, 2021	9.6% (4th)	8.7% (4th)	9.3% (6th)
15	November 29, 2021	9.9% (4th)	9.4% (4th)	8.4% (7th)
16	November 30, 2021	8.8% (7th)	8.1% (6th)	7.7% (9th)
17	December 6, 2021	8.4% (7th)	8.0% (6th)	7.4% (8th)
18	December 7, 2021	9.4% (4th)	8.4% (3rd)	—N/a
19	December 13, 2021	9.3% (5th)	8.8% (4th)	7.8% (8th)
20	December 14, 2021	12.1% (3rd)	11.4% (2nd)	10.3% (4th)
Average		7.98%	7.47%	7.3% (Note: Due to one ratings not recorded, the exact average rating is unknown.)
In the table above, the blue numbers represent the lowest ratings and the red numbers represent the highest ratings.; N/A denotes ratings that wasn't released.

== Awards and nominations ==
Name of the award ceremony, year presented, category, nominee of the award, and the result of the nomination
Award ceremony	Year	Category	Nominee	Result	Ref.
APAN Star Awards	2022	Excellence Award, Actor in a Miniseries	Rowoon	Nominated	
APAN Star Awards	2022	Top Excellence Award, Actress in a Miniseries	Park Eun-bin	Nominated	
Baeksang Arts Awards	2022	Best Actress – Television	Park Eun-bin	Nominated	
International Emmy Awards	2022	Best Telenovela	The King's Affection	Won	
Korean Broadcasting Awards	2022	Best Actor/Actress	Park Eun-bin	Won	
Korea First Brand Awards	2021	Female Acting Idol	Jung Chae-yeon	Won	
KBS Drama Awards	2021	Best Couple Award	Park Eun-bin and Rowoon	Won	
KBS Drama Awards	2021	Best New Actor	Rowoon	Won	
KBS Drama Awards	2021	Best Young Actress	Choi Myung-bin	Won	
KBS Drama Awards	2021	Popularity Award, Actor	Rowoon	Won	
KBS Drama Awards	2021	Popularity Award, Actress	Park Eun-bin	Won	
KBS Drama Awards	2021	Top Excellence Award, Actress	Park Eun-bin	Won	
KBS Drama Awards	2021	Best New Actor	Nam Yoon-su	Nominated	
KBS Drama Awards	2021	Best New Actress	Jung Chae-yeon	Nominated	
KBS Drama Awards	2021	Best Young Actor	Ko Woo-rim	Nominated	
KBS Drama Awards	2021	Excellence Award, Actress in a Miniseries	Park Eun-bin	Nominated	
Seoul International Drama Awards	2022	Best Writer	Han Hee-jung	Won	

== Listicle ==
Name of publisher, year listed, name of listicle, and placement
Publisher	Year	Listicle	Placement	Ref.
NME	2021	The 10 best Korean dramas of 2021	6th	
