= Ditto (2022 film) =

2022 South Korean film

- Theatrical release poster
- Hangul: 동감
- RR: Donggam
- MR: Tonggam
- Directed by: Seo Eun-young
- Screenplay by: Seo Eun-young
- Based on: Ditto by Kim Jung-kwon
- Produced by: Lee Jeong-eun
- Starring: Yeo Jin-goo; Cho Yi-hyun; Kim Hye-yoon; Na In-woo; Bae In-hyuk
- Cinematography: Jeong Gi-wook
- Edited by: Kim Hyeong-ju
- Music by: Kim Hong-jib
- Production company: Gogo Studios
- Distributed by: CJ Entertainment
- Release date: November 16, 2022
- Running time: 114 minutes
- Country: South Korea
- Language: Korean
- Box office: US$3.8 million

Ditto (Korean: 동감; RR: Donggam) is a 2022 South Korean science fiction romantic drama film written and directed by Seo Eun-young, starring Yeo Jin-goo, Cho Yi-hyun, Kim Hye-yoon, Na In-woo and Bae In-hyuk. A remake of the 2000 film of the same name, it depicts a story of love and friendship that takes place when a man and woman living in different time periods communicate through a ham radio by chance. It was released theatrically on November 16, 2022.

== Synopsis ==
Kim Yong is a college junior living in the year 1999, and Mo-nee living in the year 2022 is a sophomore of the same university. The two happen to get their hands on an old ham radio. During the total lunar eclipse in 1999 and 2022, the pair is magically able to communicate with one another across time through the radio and begin to talk about each other's love and friendship.

== Cast ==
=== From 1999 ===
- Yeo Jin-goo as Kim Yong, a mechanical engineering student of class of 1995
- Kim Hye-yoon as Seo Han-sol, Yong's first love
- Bae In-hyuk as Kim Eun-seong, Yong's friend
- Nam Min-woo as Park Nam-hae, Yong's best friend
- Roh Jae-won as Joo Geun-tae, a mechanical graduate student and friend of Yong
- Shin Joo-hyeop as Park Man-soo, Yong's college classmate

=== From 2022 ===
- Cho Yi-hyun as Kim Mo-nee, a sociology student of class of 2021
- Na In-woo as Oh Young-ji, Mo-nee's friend
- Lim Yu-bin as Lee Seon-ju, Mo-nee's best friend
- Kim Bo-yoon as Yeo-reum, Mo-nee's friend

=== Special appearance ===
- Park Ha-sun as a sociology professor at university

== Production ==
The first script reading of the cast was held on May 15, 2022, and filming began at end of May.

The VIP premiere which was scheduled to be held on November 8 has been cancelled, due to aftermath of Itaewon disaster.

== Original soundtrack ==
=== Part 1 ===
Released on October 1, 2022
No.	Title	Lyrics	Music	Artist	Length
1.	"Crazy for You" (너에게로 가는 길)	Kim Joo-hee	Bang Yong-seok	N.Flying	2:56
2.	"Crazy for You" (Inst.)		Bang Yong-seok		2:56
Total length:					5:52

=== Part 2 ===
Released on October 16, 2022
No.	Title	Lyrics	Music	Artist	Length
1.	"Confession" (고백)	Kang Hyeon-min	Kang Hyeon-min	Chuu	4:03
2.	"Confession" (Inst.)		Kang Hyeon-min		4:03
Total length:					8:06

=== Part 3 ===
Released on November 4, 2022
No.	Title	Lyrics	Music	Artist	Length
1.	"Bye Bye"	Jo Weon-seon	Jo Weon-seon	meenoi	3:44
2.	"Bye Bye" (Inst.)		Jo Weon-seon		3:44
Total length:					7:28

=== Part 4 ===
Released on November 6, 2022
No.	Title	Lyrics	Music	Artist	Length
1.	"Firefly" (개똥벌레)	Handol	Handol	Lee Mu-jin	3:17
2.	"Firefly" (Inst.)		Handol		3:17
Total length:					6:34

=== Part 5 ===
Released on November 14, 2022
No.	Title	Lyrics	Music	Artist	Length
1.	"Come On Baby Tonight" (늘 지금처럼)	Choi Soo-jeong	Choi Soo-jeong	Viviz	3:28
2.	"Come On Baby Tonight" (Inst.)		Choi Soo-jeong		3:28
Total length:					6:56

=== Part 6 ===
Released on November 16, 2022
No.	Title	Lyrics	Music	Artist	Length
1.	"Letter" (편지)	Heo Seung-kyoung	Kim Kwang-jin	Younha	4:25
2.	"Letter" (Inst.)		Kim Kwang-jin		4:25
Total length:					8:50

=== Part 7 ===
Released on November 25, 2022
No.	Title	Lyrics	Music	Artist	Length
1.	"For You" (너를 위해)	Chae Jeong-eun	Shin Jae-hong	Hwang Chi-yeul	4:01
2.	"For You" (Inst.)		Shin Jae-hong		4:01
Total length:					8:02
