= Choi Myung-bin =

South Korean television and film actress

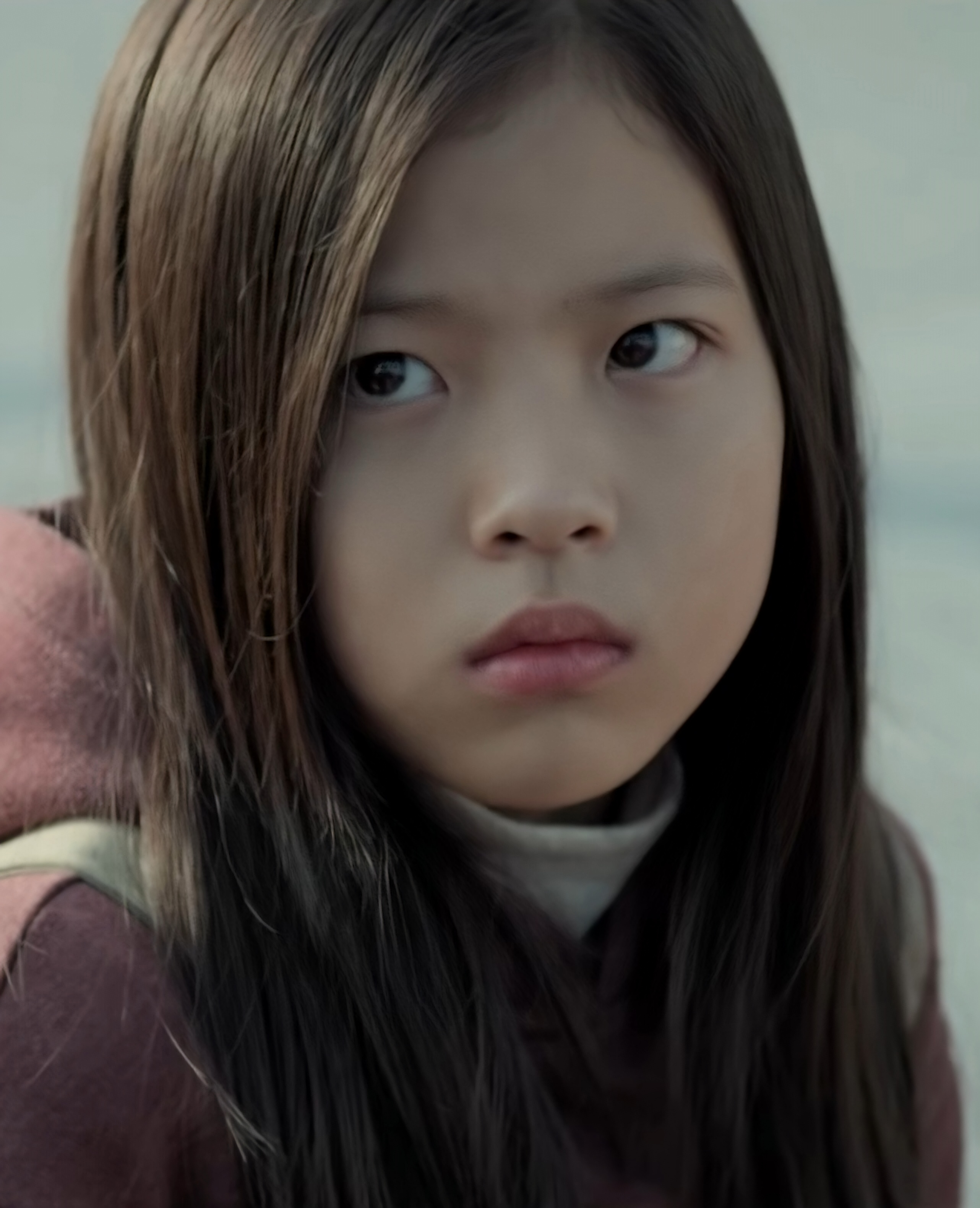
- Choi in 2019
- Born: 15 April 2008 (age 18); Suwon, South Korea
- Occupation: Actress
- Years active: 2016–present
- Agent: Prain TPC
- Awards: Best Young Actress at 2021 KBS Drama Awards

Korean name
- Hangul: 최명빈
- Hanja: 崔名彬
- RR: Choe Myeongbin
- MR: Ch'oe Myŏngbin

Choi Myung-bin (Korean: 최명빈; born on 15 April 2008) is a South Korean teenaged actress. She made her acting debut in 2016, since then, she has appeared in number of films and television series. She is best known for her roles in historical drama The King's Affection (2021) and weekend drama Young Lady and Gentleman (2021–2022) for which she won the Best Young Actress Award at 2021 KBS Drama Awards. She has acted in films also such as: The Vanished (2018) and Waiting for Rain (2021) among others.

== Career ==
Choi Myung-bin is affiliated to artist management company Prain TPC.

In 2021, Choi played young female protagonist in KBS historical romance drama The King's Affection and was praised for her dual performance as Crown Prince Lee Hwi and court maid Dam-yi. The same year, she was cast in KBS2 weekend drama Young Lady and Gentleman as Lee Jae-ni - eldest daughter of male lead. Her performance in both dramas earned her Best Young Actress award at 2021 KBS Drama Awards.

In 2022, she appeared in tvN coming-of-age romantic drama Twenty-Five Twenty-One as Kim Min-chae, the daughter of protagonist.

== Filmography ==
Key
†	Denotes films or TV productions that have not yet been released

=== Films ===
Year	Title	Role	Notes	Ref.
2016	Queen of Walking	8 years old Man-bok		
2018	The Vanished	Hwa-yeong		
2019	My First Client	Kim Da-bin		
2019	Tazza: One Eyed Jack	Young Madonna		
2021	Waiting for Rain	Young Gong So-hee		
2025	Sisterhood	So-hee		
2026	Sua's Home	Young-sun		

=== Television series ===
Year	Title	Role	Notes	Ref.
2017	Tunnel	Yoon Soo-jeong	Cameo, episode 4	
2017	Chicago Typewriter	Jeon Seol (young)	Guest	
2017	Suspicious Partner	Eun Bong-hee (young)		
2017	KBS TV Novel: Dal Soon's Spring	Han Hong-joo (young)		
2017	Black	Kang Ha-ram (young)	Guest	
2017	Prison Playbook	Lieutinant Paeng Se yun's daughter	Cameo, episode 16	
2018	Your House Helper	Im Da-yeong (young)	Guest	
2018	Return	So-mi		
2018	100 Days My Prince	Kim So-hye (young)		
2019	Trap	Go Min-joo		
2019	Kill It	Do Hyun-jin (young)	Cameo, episode 6	
2019	Queen: Love and War	Kang Eun-bo / Kang Eun-gi (young)	Guest	
2020	Itaewon Class	Jo Yi-seo (young)	Cameo, episode 3	
2021	Voice 4	Kang Kwon-joo (young)		
2021	The King's Affection	Lee Hwi / Dam-yi (young)		
2021–2022	Young Lady and Gentleman	Lee Jae-ni		
2022	Twenty-Five Twenty-One	Kim Min-chae		
2022–2023	Missing: The Other Side	Moon Bo-Ra	Season 2	
2022–2023	Trolley	Nam Yoon-seo		
2025	Good Boy	Ko Jung-a		

=== Web series ===
Year	Title	Role	Ref.
2021	Dramaworld 2	Sam	
2024	No Way Out: The Roulette	Baek So-mi	

=== Musical shows ===
Date of appearance	Nursery rhymes	Co-singer	Publisher	Ref.
Wicked
April 18, 2016	"Hello"	Lee Ha-rang, Choi Ye-na, Kwak I-an, Park Ye-eum, Hong Eui-hyun	Genie Music	
April 18, 2016	"Thinking of Brother"	Park Ye-eum	Genie Music	

== Awards and nominations ==
Name of the award ceremony, year presented, category, nominee of the award, and the result of the nomination
Award ceremony	Year	Category	Nominee / Work	Result	Ref.
KBS Drama Awards	2021	Best Young Actress	Young Lady and Gentleman and The King's Affection	Won	
SBS Drama Awards	2023	Best Young Actress	Trolley	Nominated	
