= Sisterhood (2025 film) =

2025 South Korean film

- Hangul: 시스터후드
- RR: Siseuteohudeu
- MR: Sisŭt'ŏhudŭ
- Directed by: Yoon Eun-kyoung
- Written by: Yoon Eun-kyoung
- Produced by: Lee Yun-jin
- Starring: Kim Joo-ryoung; Han Ji-hyun; Choi Myung-bin
- Cinematography: Baek Moon-su
- Edited by: Moon Jong-hun
- Music by: Park Ki-heon
- Production company: iNew Company
- Distributed by: Special Movie City (South Korea); Hive Filmworks Inc. (international)
- Release dates: July 6, 2025 (BIFAN); November 13, 2025 (AWFF); March 22, 2026 (FIFF)
- Running time: 95 minutes
- Country: South Korea
- Language: Korean

Sisterhood (Korean: 시스터후드) is a 2025 South Korean mystery and thriller film written and directed by Yoon Eun-kyoung. Starring Kim Joo-ryoung, Han Ji-hyun and Choi Myung-bin, it had its premiere at the 29th edition of the Bucheon International Fantastic Film Festival under its "Korean Fantastic: Features" section.

It is set to be released in theaters in 2027 by Special Movie City.

== Premise ==
Kim Joo-ryoung is Jung Yul-hee, a bestselling mystery fiction novelist in her 40s who just filed a divorce against her husband. Choi Myung-bin portrays So-hee, the couple's daughter whose views on the world she lives in became cynical due to her parents' divorce and having to move outside the city. Standing on their way is Ryu Mi-jee, a college student who easily wins people's hearts with her pure and kind impression but has a mysterious - and dangerous - side hidden from them: she has an addiction to relationships and intimacy. Mi-jee is portrayed by Han Ji-hyun.

== Cast ==
=== Main ===
- Kim Joo-ryoung as Jung Yul-hee
- Han Ji-hyun as Ryu Mi-jee
- Choi Myung-bin as So-hee

=== Supporting ===
- Lee Seung-joon as Yul-hee's husband and So-hee's father
- Bae Bo-ram as an investigative reporter
- TBA as Yul-hee's father, who gave her a country house as inheritance

== Production ==
Sisterhood is written and directed by Yoon Eun-kyoung, who previously won the Best Director award in the 34th Singapore International Film Festival for The Tenants (세입자, 2023), which also won the International Federation of Film Critics (FIPRESCI) Award in the same festival. It is produced by Lee Yun-jin for iNew Company (Warning: Do Not Play (2018), Tastes of Horror (괴담만찬, 2023) and Wavve's Love.exe (2025)).

On April 18, 2025, the BIFAN organizing committee announced that it chose Sisterhood to be presented in the "Fantastic 7" market genre showcase of the Cannes Film Festival's Marché du Film on May 18, 2025.

=== Casting ===
On October 2, 2024, iNew Company announced the casting of Kim Joo-ryoung, Han Ji-hyun and Choi Myung-bin for the lead roles. Lee Seung-joon was also cast for a supporting role.

On July 11, 2025, Bae Bo-ram's agency S&A Entertainment announced through its Instagram account that she was cast for a supporting role in the film.

=== Filming ===
Script reading for the film was held on October 2, 2024. Filming began on October 8, 2024 and ended on November 23, 2024.

== Release ==
Sisterhood had its world premiere at the 29th edition of the Bucheon International Fantastic Film Festival under its "Korean Fantastic: Features" section on July 6, 2025. It also had its US premiere on November 13, 2025 at the 11th edition of the Asian World Film Festival under the "Focus on Korea" section sponsored by the Korean Cultural Center, Los Angeles, as well as a European premiere on March 22, 2026 at the 40th edition of the Fribourg International Film Festival in Switzerland under its "Genre Cinema (I): Thank you Mum!" section.

The movie was also premiered in the 20th edition of the Asian Pop-Up Cinema (APUC) Festival in Chicago on April 5, 2026 (under the "South Korean Cinema Showcase" section), and the 12th edition of Filmfest Bremen in Germany 12 days later.

In November 2025, Special Movie City acquired the distribution, marketing and intellectual property rights for the film in South Korea. It was initially set to be released in theaters in 2026, however, it was pushed back to 2027.

Hive Filmworks Inc. handles international sales for the film.
