= Lee So-young (artist) =

South Korean manhwa artist

Lee So-young 이소영
- Born: 31 August 1973 (age 53)
- Areas: Writer, Artist
- Notable works: Model

Korean name
- Hangul: 이소영
- RR: I Soyeong
- MR: I Soyŏng

Lee So-young (Korean: 이소영; born 31 August 1973) is a South Korean manhwa artist. Her works, including Model and Arcana, are licensed by Tokyopop.

== Works ==
- Model (1999)
- Check (2001)
- Arcana (2003)
- Horror Collector (2007)
- Blue Bird (2009)
- Yeonmo (2011–14)
