= Cheer Up (South Korean TV series) =

2022 South Korean television series

- Promotional poster
- Hangul: 치얼업
- RR: Chieoreop
- MR: Ch'iŏrŏp
- Genre: Romantic comedy; Youth; Mystery; Musical
- Developed by: Lee Ok-gyu (planning); Wavve (production investment)
- Written by: Cha Hae-won
- Directed by: Han Tae-seop
- Starring: Han Ji-hyun; Bae In-hyuk; Kim Hyun-jin; Jang Gyu-ri; Lee Eun-saem; Yang Dong-geun
- Music by: Shin Jae-pyung
- Country of origin: South Korea
- Original language: Korean
- No. of episodes: 16

Production
- Executive producer: Lee Ok-gyu
- Producers: Park Gi-yeol; Lee Him-chan
- Production company: Studio S

Original release
- Network: SBS TV
- Release: October 3 – December 13, 2022

Cheer Up (Korean: 치얼업; RR: Chieoreop) is a South Korean television series starring Han Ji-hyun, Bae In-hyuk, Kim Hyun-jin, Jang Gyu-ri, Lee Eun-saem, and Yang Dong-geun. It premiered on SBS TV on October 3, 2022, and aired every Monday and Tuesday at 22:00 (KST).

== Synopsis ==
A mystery campus romance set in the backdrop of a cheering squad where eating and living is useless in the moment, but splendid and precious romance is.

== Cast ==
=== Main ===
- Han Ji-hyun as Do Hae-yi, a member of Yeonhee University Cheeerleader Club and student of the theology department.
  - Park Min-ha as young Do Hae-yi
- Bae In-hyuk as Park Jung-woo, president of Yeonhee University Cheerleader Club.
- Kim Hyun-jin as Jin Sun-ho, a member of Yeonhee University Cheerleader Club and medical student at Yeonhee University College of Medicine.
- Jang Gyu-ri as Tae Cho-hee, vice-president of Yeonhee University Cheerleader Club.
- Lee Eun-saem as Joo Sun-ja, a member of Yeonhee University Cheerleader Club, and a friend of Do Hae-yi.
- Yang Dong-geun as Bae Young-woong, an alumnus of Yeonhee University who supports Yeonhee University Cheerleader Club.

=== Supporting ===
==== Yeonhee University cheering squad Theia ====
- Lee Jung-jun as Ki Woon-chan, the bright and cheerful member of the Yeonhee University Cheerleading Club.
- Han Soo-ah as Choi So-yoon, a member of Yeonhee University Cheerleader Club.
- Kim Shin-bi as Lim Yong-il, a member of Yeonhee University Cheerleader Club.
- Hyun Woo-seok as Kim Min-jae, a cheerleader who joined the Yeonhee University Cheerleading Club despite being dropped out three times. Due to his cynical personality, he turns his back on their supporters.
- Park Bo-yeon as Lee Yu-min, Park Jung-woo's first love who was involved in an accident two years ago that forced her to leave the club.
- Nam Joong-gyu as Jung Soo-il, a senior at Yeonhee University and former Deputy Head of Cheer Group School. He is good at acrobatics and vocals.

==== Yeonhee University ====
- Ryu Hyun-kyung as Shin Ji-young, deputy director of student affairs at Yeonhee University.
- Eun Hae-seong as Jae-hyuk, Do Hae-yi's ex-boyfriend who is a medical student at Yeonhee University.
- Yoo Yi-jun as President of the Broadcasting Division at Yeonhee University.
- Song Duk-ho as Song Ho-min, broadcasting member of Yeonhee University.

==== Hogyeong University ====
- Jung Shin-hye as Lee Ha-jin,

Cheerleader at Hogyeong University.

- Han Soo-ah as Choi Ji-yoon, a new member of Hogyeong University cheering squad and So-yoon's twin sister.

==== Do Hae-yi's family ====
- Jang Young-nam as Seong Chun-yang, Do Hae-yi's mother.
- Lee Min-jae as Do Jae-yi.
  - Park Min-joon as young Do Jae-yi, Do Hae-yi's younger brother.

==== Park Jung-woo's family ====
- Yoon Bok-in as Jeong Seon-hye

Park Jung-woo's mother.

==== Jin Seon-ho's family ====
- Baek Ji-won as Hwang Jin-hee, Jin Seon-ho's mother.
- Kwon Hyuk as Jin Min-cheol, Jin Seon-ho's father.

==== Other ====
- Byun Yoon-jung as Seong Chul-mo, Seong-cheol's mother and Do Hae-yi's tutor.

=== Extended ===
- Lee Seung-min
- Lee Jong-hyuk as Kyu-jin
- Im Ji-ho as Kim Jin-il

=== Special appearance ===
- Jukjae as Himself
- Jang Na-ra as Na Jung-sun, a senior and former cheerleader at Yeonhee University.

== Production ==
The series was planned and produced by the drama department of SBS known as Studio S. The first script reading was held on August 24, 2022, at the SBS Ilsan Production Center, in the presence of the cast and production team including director Han Tae-seop and writer Cha Hae-won.

== Viewership ==
Cheer Up : South Korea viewers per episode (thousands)

Season	Episode number																Average
Season	1	2	3	4	5	6	7	8	9	10	11	12	13	14	15	16	Average
1	N/A	N/A	N/A	N/A	N/A	508	N/A	511	N/A	N/A	N/A	N/A	N/A	N/A	N/A	N/A	N/A

Source: Audience measurement performed nationwide by Nielsen Korea.

Average TV viewership ratings
Ep.	Original broadcast date	Average audience share (Nielsen Korea)	
Ep.	Original broadcast date	Nationwide	Seoul
1	October 3, 2022	2.3% (36th)	N/A
2	October 4, 2022	2.1% (32nd)	N/A
3	October 10, 2022	2.2% (35th)	2.8% (NR)
4	October 11, 2022	2.4% (27th)	N/A
5	October 17, 2022	2.4% (30th)	N/A
6	October 18, 2022	3.2% (20th)	3.9% (18th)
7	October 24, 2022	2.2% (33rd)	N/A
8	October 25, 2022	2.6% (26th)	N/A
9	November 8, 2022 (Note: Episodes 9 and 10 were delayed one week due to the Seoul Halloween crowd crush, and respectively aired on November 7 and 8 respectively.) (Note: Episode 9, which was scheduled to air on November 7, was canceled due to the broadcast of the 5th Korean Series Professional Baseball Match.)	2.2% (27th)	N/A
10	November 14, 2022	2.4% (28th)	N/A
11	November 15, 2022	2.2% (30th)	N/A
12	November 29, 2022 (Note: The broadcasts on November 21, 22, and 28, were canceled due to the 2022 World Cup coverage and aired on November 29 instead.)	2.4% (27th)	N/A
13	December 5, 2022	1.7% (42nd)	N/A
14	December 6, 2022	1.8% (40th)	N/A
15	December 12, 2022	1.9% (34th)	N/A
16	December 13, 2022	2.2% (29th)	N/A
Average		2.3%	— (Note: Due to some ratings not recorded, the exact average rating is unknown.)
In the table above, the blue numbers represent the lowest ratings and the red numbers represent the highest ratings.; NR denotes that the series did not rank in the top 20 daily programs on that date.; N/A denotes that ratings were not released.

== Awards and nominations ==
Name of the award ceremony, year presented, category, nominee of the award, and the result of the nomination
Award ceremony	Year	Category	Nominee / Work	Result	Ref.
Blue Dragon Series Awards	2023	Best New Actor	Bae In-hyuk	Nominated	
Blue Dragon Series Awards	2023	Best New Actress	Han Ji-hyun	Nominated	
SBS Drama Awards	2022	Best Supporting Team	Cheer Up (Note: with Bae In-hyuk, Han Ji-hyun, Jang Gyu-ri, Kim Hyun-jin, Ryu Hyun-kyung, Yang Dong-geun, Kim Shin-bi, Lee Eun-saem, Lee Jung-jun, Han Soo-ah and Hyun Woo-seok)	Won	
SBS Drama Awards	2022	Best New Actor	Bae In-hyuk	Won	
SBS Drama Awards	2022	Best New Actor	Kim Hyun-jin	Won	
SBS Drama Awards	2022	Best New Actress	Jang Gyu-ri	Won	
SBS Drama Awards	2022	Best New Actress	Lee Eun-saem	Won	
SBS Drama Awards	2022	Top Excellence Award, Actress in a Miniseries Romance/Comedy Drama	Han Ji-hyun	Nominated	
SBS Drama Awards	2022	Excellence Award, Actor in a Miniseries Romance/Comedy Drama	Bae In-hyuk	Nominated	
SBS Drama Awards	2022	Excellence Award, Actress in a Miniseries Romance/Comedy Drama	Jang Gyu-ri	Nominated	
SBS Drama Awards	2022	Best Supporting Actor in a Miniseries Romance/Comedy Drama	Yang Dong-geun	Nominated	
