= At a Distance, Spring Is Green =

2021 South Korean television series

- Promotional poster
- Hangul: 멀리서 보면 푸른 봄
- Lit.: Blue Spring from a Distance
- RR: Meolliseo bomyeon pureun bom
- MR: Mŏllisŏ pomyŏn p'urŭn pom
- Genre: Slice-of-life; Coming of age
- Created by: KBS Drama Division
- Based on: At a Distance, Spring Is Green by Jinyoong
- Written by: Ko Yeon-soo
- Directed by: Kim Jung-hyun
- Starring: Park Ji-hoon; Kang Min-ah; Bae In-hyuk
- Composer: Koo Young-hyuk
- Country of origin: South Korea
- Original language: Korean
- No. of episodes: 12

Production
- Executive producer: Kang Byung-taek (KBS)
- Producers: Jo Yoon-jung; Ji Byung-Hyun; Baek Seung-Min
- Production company: Victory Contents

Original release
- Network: KBS2
- Release: June 14 – July 20, 2021

At a Distance, Spring Is Green (Korean: 멀리서 보면 푸른 봄) is a 2021 South Korean television series adapted from the webtoon of the same name. It aired on Monday and Tuesday at 21:30 (KST) from June 14 to July 20, 2021, on KBS2. It is available for worldwide streaming on Viki and iQiyi, the latter exclusively in Southeast Asia.

At a Distance, Spring Is Green is a coming-of-age, campus story about youth in their 20s whose lives seem to be like the beauty of spring from afar but cold and harsh when viewed up close.

== Synopsis ==
The drama focuses on Yeo Jun (Park Ji-hoon), a charming and rich freshman at Myeong-il University who is loved by his peers. During a group project, he meets Nam Su-hyeon (Bae In-hyuk), a third-year socially awkward student in his department. Coming from a poor family, Su-hyeon is only concerned with earning school credits and money to support his family. He does not have time for friends and even less time for spoiled, rich kids. Another third-year student, Kim So-bin (Kang Min-ah) – who is quite average in everything and struggles – joins the group; the three form an unlikely, strange trio.

== Cast ==
=== Main ===
- Park Ji-hoon as Yeo Jun
  - Seo Woo-jin as young Yeo Jun

Yeo Jun is a first-year business student at Myeong-il University who comes from a wealthy family. He is loved by his peers for his appearance, charm, and great social skills. However, Yeo Jin has a painful scar behind his bright mask. He takes an interest in Nam Soo-hyun, a student in his department and forms an unlikely friendship and chemistry. Yeo Jun gradually begins to reveal his true self and further builds relationships with those around him.

- Kang Min-ah as Kim So-bin

So-bin is a third-year freshman in the business department of Myeong-il University. She is timid, yet conscious of what others think. Her grades and family status are all mediocre, so struggles to stand out. Since childhood, So-bin has been in unrequited love with her playboy friend Hong Chan-ki, who she cannot hate. Soo-bin later meets Yeo Jun, a popular freshman in her department, but they began a strange and confusing relationship.

- Bae In-hyuk as Nam Soo-hyun

Soo-Hyun is a cold and cynical third-year student at Myeong-il University. He gets into confrontations with people around him. His father died when he was young and his mother is sick, so he works part-time to support his family, including his little brother. Soo-bin closed his heart to others and became an outsider who does not make time for friends. He may clash with Yeo Jun due to their opposite personalities, but becomes close to in their shared pain and unlikely chemistry.

=== Supporting ===
- Kwon Eun-bin as Wang Young-ran

Young-ran is third-year student Physical Education at Myeongil University. She seems cool and tough, which her oldest friend, Nam Soo-hyun knows the secret of her struggle to express. Young-ran had a hidden, long-time crush on Soo-hyun, but complications arise when her roommate Gong Mi-joo is involved.

- Woo Da-vi as Gong Mi-joo

Mi-joo is a princess-like girl who majors in Design at Myeong-il University. She grew up under her father's extraordinary love and over-protection and struggles to treat others well. As Kim So-bin and Wang Young-ran's roommate, her prickly, sensitive, and arrogant personality sometimes makes troubles. Despite her selfishness, Mi-joo wants to find her real self and true love, and eventually lays eyes on Nam Soo-hyun.

- Choi Jung-woo as Hong Chan-ki

Chan-ki is a bright and carefree playboy majoring in Computer Science at Myeong-il University. He seems to be carefree, but often feels empty inside and has hidden worries. Chan-ki is the only child of two civil servants in The Ministry of Economy. He has been Kim So-bin's good friend since childhood, but has never flirted with her or seen her as more than a friend.

- Lee Woo-je as Han Jung-ho

Jung-ho is a third-year student in Business Administration. After being discharged from the military, he returned to school late so his grades were higher than those of his third-year peers. Jung-ho believes in age seniority and wants to be treated with that respect. He whenever his juniors have the slightest objection to his arguments and opinions. Jung-ho out with few of his classmates but clings to Yeo Jun because due to his wealth.

- Yoo In-soo as Oh Chun-gook

Chun-gook is a third-year student of Business Administration who likes to gossip and spread rumors. He is also Jung-ho's best friend and junior.

- Yoon Jung-hoon as Ko Sang-tae

Sang-tae is a freshman in Business Administration who went to high school with Yeo Jun and is now also his college classmate. He hangs around Yeo Jun but is jealous of him.

- Shin Su-hyun as Park Hye-ji

Hye-ji is a year in Business Administration who likes to hang out, but has a double-faced attitude. She discriminates against others based on money, appearance, and education. Hye-ji tries to get along with the popular freshman, Yeo Jun, which does not go well. She tries to interfere Kim So-bin due to her closeness Yeo Jun.

- Choi Moon-hee as Lee Gi-sun

Moon-hee is a third-year student in Business Administration and Hye-ji's best friend. She disapproves of her friend's discriminatory behavior, but listens to her and completes her difficult requests.

- Bin Chan-wook as Park Jung-bum

Jung-bum is a fourth-year student in Business Administration and a brazen liar. He is a working scholarship student in the teaching school and Business Administration department office. Jung-bum is jealous of Kim So-bin, whom Assistant Seol likes. He acts ambitious and wants to gain favor with Professor Song.

- Cha Chung-hwa as Professor Song

The cold professor of Business Administration at Myeong-il University who is also an authoritarian. She does not understand Professor Park, who wants to get along with students, and believes school is a battlefield of competition.

- Eru as Professor Park

Professor of Business Administration at Myeong-il University who loves students. He dreams of eating with students and talk about life in a candid way.

- Lee Ye-rim as assistant Seol

Seol is an assistant in the Department of Business Administration at Myeong-il University who is close to her juniors with a sociable style and supports them. She tries to help Kim So-bin when she walks alone.

==== Yeo family ====
- Na In-woo as Yeo Jun-wan
  - Choi Seung-hoon as young Yeo Jun-wan

Jun-wan is Yeo Jun's older brother who is the youngest professor at Myeong-il University. He understood calculus at the age of six and was reading mathematics papers at foreign universities by age 12. Unlike his older brother, Jun-wan does not express emotions and is rational in his decisions, words, as well as actions. He does not feel any meaning in his accomplishments as the youngest person with a doctor title in South Korea, either.

- Kim Hyeong-mook as Yeo Myeong-hoon

Myeong-hoon is Yeo Jun and Yeo Jun-wan's father who serves as president of a large conglomerate known as Mijin Foods. He is a competitive workaholic who does not take day-off and believes that people who cannot stand out in a satisfactory way do not hold value.

- So Hee-jung as Cha Jung-joo

Yeo Jun and Yeo Jun-wan's mother, Jung-joo is musician who graduated with her degree and planned to study abroad. However, due to family pressure, she was forced to give up her dream and get married. Jung-joo carries a lot of complex and intense anger inside. All the friends she went to school with are successful music professors and famous musicians, while she just works at Mijin Foods. She tried her best to raise her two sons, Joon and Joon-wan, despite her strictness.

==== Nam family ====
- Kim Su-gyeom as Nam Gu-hyeon, Nam Soo-hyun's younger brother who studies civil service exam to become a policeman, following the footsteps of his deceased father. Immature and selfish, he is not completely aware of the financial burden Soo-hyun carries.

== Original soundtrack ==
At a Distance, Spring Is Green Soundtrack

Soundtrack album by Various
- Released: 2021
- Recorded: 2021
- Genre: Soundtrack
- Languages: Korean; English
- Labels: Kakao; Victory Contents

=== Part 1 ===
Released on June 15, 2021
| No. | Title | Lyrics | Music | Artist | Length |
|---|---|---|---|---|---|
| 1. | "Spring Spring Spring" (봄봄봄) | Roy Kim | Roy Kim; Bae Young-kyung | Punch | 3:15 |
| 2. | "Spring Spring Spring" (봄봄봄 (Inst.)) | | Roy Kim; Bae Young-kyung | | 3:15 |

=== Part 2 ===
Released on June 22, 2021
| No. | Title | Lyrics | Music | Artist | Length |
|---|---|---|---|---|---|
| 1. | "Talk to me" (말만 해) | Famous Bro | Famous Bro; Hymax; Seo Ji-eun; Dante | Park Ji-hoon | 2:53 |
| 2. | "Talk to me" (말만 해 (Inst.)) | | Famous Bro; Hymax; Seo Ji-eun; Dante | | 2:53 |

=== Part 3 ===
Released on June 29, 2021
| No. | Title | Lyrics | Music | Artist | Length |
|---|---|---|---|---|---|
| 1. | "We will be not all together" (품) | paulkyte | Paulkyte; A-picks | Rothy; Han Seung-yoon | 4:16 |
| 2. | "We will be not all together" (품 (Inst.)) | | Paulkyte; A-picks | | 4:16 |

== Ratings ==
Average TV viewership ratings
| Ep. | Part | Original broadcast date | Average audience share (Nielsen Korea) |
| Ep. | Part | Original broadcast date | Nationwide |
|---|---|---|---|
| 1 | 1 | June 14, 2021 | 2.3% |
| 1 | 2 | June 14, 2021 | 2.6% |
| 2 | 1 | June 15, 2021 | 1.8% |
| 2 | 2 | June 15, 2021 | 2.2% |
| 3 | 1 | June 21, 2021 | 1.9% |
| 3 | 2 | June 21, 2021 | 2.0% |
| 4 | 1 | June 22, 2021 | 2.0% |
| 4 | 2 | June 22, 2021 | 2.4% |
| 5 | 1 | June 28, 2021 | 1.8% |
| 5 | 2 | June 28, 2021 | 1.4% |
| 6 | 1 | June 29, 2021 | 1.9% |
| 6 | 2 | June 29, 2021 | 2.4% |
| 7 | 1 | July 5, 2021 | 1.6% |
| 8 | 1 | July 6, 2021 | 2.2% |
| 9 | 1 | July 12, 2021 | 2.0% |
| 10 | 1 | July 13, 2021 | 2.0% |
| 11 | 1 | July 19, 2021 | 1.5% |
| 12 | 1 | July 20, 2021 | 2.2% |
| Average | | | 2.01% |

- In this table, the blue numbers represent the lowest ratings and the red numbers represent the highest ratings.

== Accolades ==
Name of the award ceremony, year presented, category, nominee of the award, and the result of the nomination
| Award ceremony | Year | Category | Nominee | Result | Ref. |
|---|---|---|---|---|---|
| KBS Drama Awards | 2021 | Best New Actor | Park Ji-hoon | Nominated | |
