= Pyeongwon of Goguryeo =

25th King of Goguryeo (r. 559–590)

Pyeongwon 평원
- Taewang
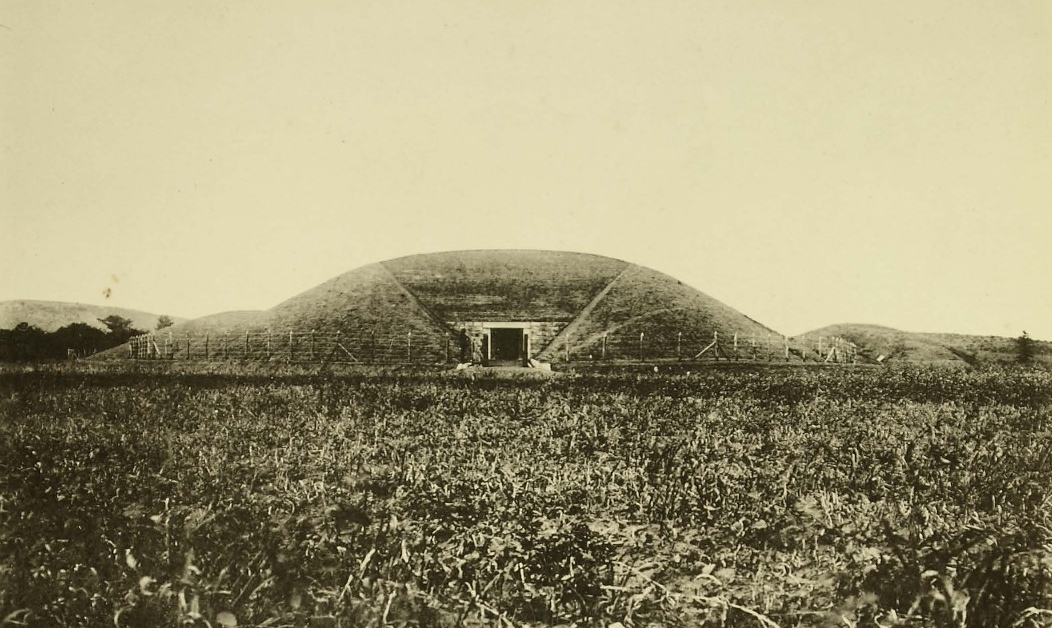
- Possible tomb of King Pyeongwon

King of Goguryeo
- Reign: March 559 – October 590 A.D.
- Coronation: March 559 A.D.
- Predecessor: Yangwon
- Successor: Yeongyang

Crown Prince of Goguryeo
- Reign: April 557 – March 559 A.D.
- Coronation: April 557 A.D.
- Predecessor: Pyeongseon
- Successor: Daewon
- Born: Go Yangseon/Tang; Unknown; Pyongyang Seong
- Died: October 590 A.D. Pyongyang Seong
- Burial: Gangsu Great Tomb
- Issue: Daewon; Geonmu; Daeyang; Princess Pyeonggang
Regnal name
- Pyeongansangho Taewang; Pyeonggang Taewang
Posthumous name
- Pyeongwon Taewang
- House: Go
- Dynasty: Goguryeo
- Father: Yangwon
- Religion: Buddhism
- Occupation: King

- Pyeongwon of Goguryeo
- Hangul: 양성; 탕
- Hanja: 陽成; 湯
- RR: Yangseong; Tang
- MR: Yangsŏng; T'ang

Monarch name
- Hangul: 평원왕; 평강(상호)왕
- Hanja: 平原王; 平岡(上好)王
- RR: Pyeongwonwang; Pyeonggang(sangho)wang
- MR: P'yŏngwŏnwang; P'yŏnggang(sangho)wang

Pyeongwon (ruled 559–590) was the 25th ruler of Goguryeo, the northernmost of the Three Kingdoms of Korea. Pyeongwon was also known as 'Pyeonggangsanghowang'. His birth name was Yangseong (though the Suishu and Tangshu have him as Tang).

== Reign ==
The years of Pyeongwon's rule are generally agreed upon by historians, but his year of birth has not been established with any degree of certainty. It is known that he was the eldest son of Yangwon of Goguryeo and became crown prince in 557, two years before assuming full power. He is said to have been courageous, and skilled in horseriding and archery.

By this time, royal power had been significantly eroded by the aristocracy. Concerned for the people, he encouraged agricultural and sericultural developments and reduced the royal cuisine.

He maintained tense but relatively peaceful relations with the Göktürks and the various Chinese dynasties, briefly battling the Northern Zhou at the Liaodong Peninsula in 577. He frequently sent tributes to the Chen dynasty, Northern Qi, Northern Zhou and Sui dynasty. As the Sui dynasty united China, King Pyeongwon prepared for the impending war.

The southern border with the other two Korean kingdoms was relatively peaceful as the Silla-Baekje alliance fell apart. In 586, he moved the capital to Jangan fortress.

In 590 (the 32nd year of his reign), the king received news that the state of Chen had fallen and was greatly alarmed. For defensive purposes he ordered troops into training and the augmentation of military provisions.

The rule of Pyeongwon came to an end in 590, which is the year of his death according to the Samguk sagi, but there is no specific documentation to confirm the circumstances.

He was given the posthumous royal title of King Pyeongwon.

== Family ==
- Father: King Yangwon (양원왕; 陽原王)
  - Grandfather: King Anwon (안원왕; 安原王)
  - Grandmother: Middle Lady (중부인; 中夫人)
- Unknown wife
  - Daughter: Princess Pyeonggang (평강공주; 平岡公主) – married On Dal (온달; 溫達).
  - 1st son: Prince Won (원; 元)
  - 2nd son: Prince Geonmu (건무; 建武)
  - 3rd son: Prince Daeyang (대양; 大陽); father of King Bojang.

== Popular culture ==
- Portrayed by Kil Yong-woo in the 2009 KBS2 TV series Invincible Lee Pyung Kang.
- Portrayed by Lee Yong-jik in the 2017 Netflix TV series My Only Love Song.
- Portrayed by Kim Pub-Lae in the 2021 KBS2 TV series River Where the Moon Rises.

== See also ==
- History of Korea
- List of Korean monarchs
- On Dal

Pyeongwon of Goguryeo House of Go Died: 590
Regnal titles
Preceded by Yangwon	Monarch of Goguryeo; 559–590	Succeeded by Yeongyang
