= Yeongnyu of Goguryeo =

27th King of Goguryeo (r. 618–642)

Yeongnyu 영류
- Taewang

King of Goguryeo
- Reign: September 618 – October 642 A.D.
- Coronation: September 618 A.D.
- Predecessor: Yeongyang
- Successor: Bojang
- Born: Go Geonmu/Seong; Unknown; Pyongyang Seong
- Died: October 642 A.D. Pyongyang Seong
- Issue: Prince Hwangwon; Price Bukdeok; Princess Muyeong; Princess Sukyeong
Regnal name
- Muyang Taewang
Posthumous name
- Yeongnyu Taewang
- House: Ko
- Dynasty: Goguryeo
- Father: Pyeongwon
- Religion: Buddhism
- Occupation: King

- Yeongnyu of Goguryeo
- Hangul: 건무; 성
- Hanja: 建武; 成
- RR: Geonmu; Seong
- MR: Kŏnmu; Sŏng

Monarch name
- Hangul: 영류왕
- Hanja: 榮留王
- RR: Yeongnyuwang
- MR: Yŏngnyuwang

Yeongnyu (?–642) was the 27th monarch of Goguryeo, the northernmost of the Three Kingdoms of Korea, from 618 to 642.

== Background ==
He was the younger half-brother of the 26th monarch Yeong-yang, and son of the 25th king Pyeongwon. He assumed the throne when Yeong-yang died in 618.

== Reign ==
In China, the Sui dynasty was followed by the Tang dynasty in 618, the year of Yeongnyu's ascension. Goguryeo was recovering from the Goguryeo–Sui War, and the new Tang emperor was still completing its internal unification. Neither being in a position for new hostilities, Goguryeo and Tang exchanged emissaries and upon Tang's request, conducted a prisoner exchange in 622.

In 624, Tang officially presented Taoism to the Goguryeo court, which sent scholars the following year to study Taoism and Buddhism.

However, as Tang gained strength, in 631, it sent a small force to destroy a monument to Goguryeo's victory over the Sui. In response, Goguryeo built the Cheolli Jangseong defensive wall along the western border, a 15-year project begun in 631 under the supervision of Yŏn Kaesomun.

During this time, Goguryeo continued its battles to recover lost territory from the southern Korean kingdom Silla. Silla's Kim Yu-sin took Goguryeo's Nangbi fortress in 629.

== Fall, death and succession ==
Yeongnyu and some of the government officials planned to kill some of the more powerful military officers. They planned first to kill Yŏn Kaesomun, whose power and influence were rapidly overtaking the throne's. The young man eventually discovered the plot, and immediately went to Pyongyang to kill the plotters, including the king. Yeongnyu was killed in 642.

Yŏn Kaesomun placed Yeongnyu's nephew, Bojang, on the throne.

== Family ==
- Father: King Pyeongwon (평원왕; 平原王)
  - Grandfather: King Yangwon (양원왕; 陽原王)
- Unknown wife
  - Son: Prince Hwangwon (환권; 桓權)
  - Son: Prince Bokdeok (복덕; 福德)
  - Daughter: Lady Muyeong (고무영; 高務營)
  - Daughter: Lady Sukyeong (고숙영; 高肅營)

== In popular culture ==
- Portrayed by Yang Youngjun in 1992–1993 KBS TV series The Three Kingdoms.
- Portrayed by Choi Jong-hwan in 2006–2007 SBS TV series Yeon Gaesomun.
- Portrayed by Kim Heung-soo in 2009 KBS TV series Invincible Lee Pyung Kang.
- Portrayed by Kim Yeong-cheol in 2013 KBS2 TV series The Blade and Petal.
- Portrayed in the 2017 KBS TV series Chronicles of Korea.
- Portrayed by Seongminjun in 2021 KBS TV series River Where the Moon Rises.
- Portrayed by Jo Sung-ha in 2026–2027 KBS TV series Sword & Silence.

== See also ==
- List of Korean monarchs
- Three Kingdoms of Korea
- History of Korea

Yeongnyu of Goguryeo House of Ko Died: 642
Regnal titles
| Preceded by Yeongyang | Monarch of Goguryeo; 590–642 | Succeeded by Bojang |
