= Yeongyang of Goguryeo =

26th King of Goguryeo (r. 590–618)

Yeongyang 영양
- Taewang
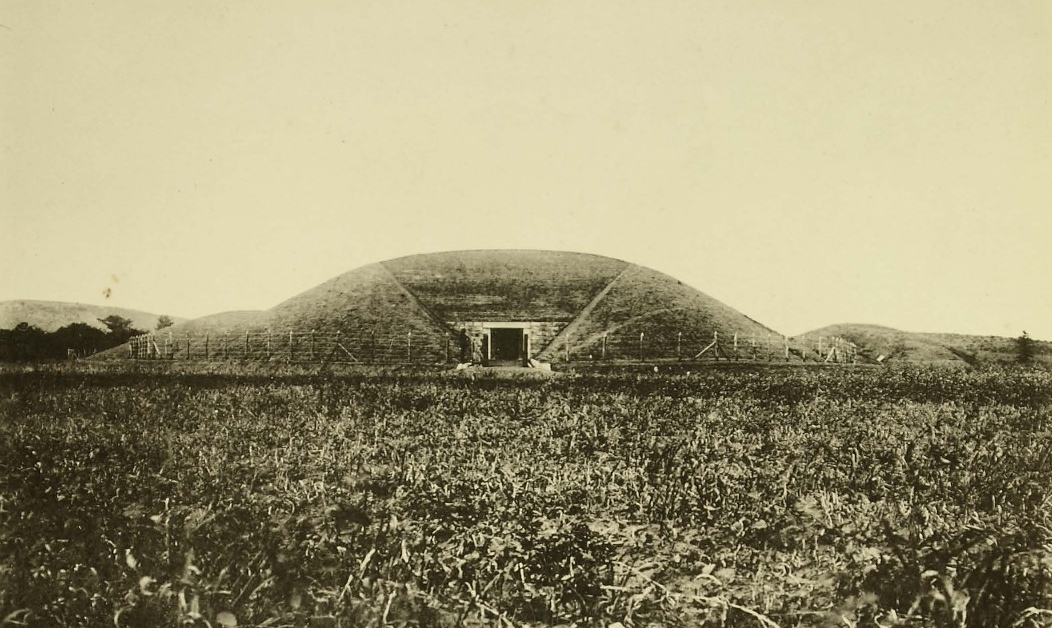
- Possible Tomb of King Yeongyang

King of Goguryeo
- Reign: October 590 – September 618 A.D.
- Coronation: October 590 A.D.
- Predecessor: Pyeongwon
- Successor: Yeongnyu

Crown Prince of Goguryeo
- Reign: January 565 – October 590 A.D.
- Coronation: January 565 A.D.
- Predecessor: Yangseong
- Successor: Hwangwon
- Born: Go Daewon/Won; Pyongyang Seong
- Died: September 618 A.D. Pyongyang Seong
- Burial: Gangsu Great Tomb
Regnal name
- Taeheung Taewang; Gunghyeong Taewang
Posthumous name
- Yeongyang Taewang; Pyeongyang Taewang
- House: Go
- Dynasty: Goguryeo
- Father: Pyeongwon
- Religion: Buddhism
- Occupation: King

- Yeongyang of Goguryeo
- Hangul: 원; 대원
- Hanja: 元; 大元
- RR: Won; Daewon
- MR: Wŏn; Taewŏn

Monarch name
- Hangul: 영양왕; 평양왕
- Hanja: 嬰陽王; 平陽王
- RR: Yeongyangwang; Pyeongyangwang
- MR: Yŏngyangwang; P'yŏngyangwang

Yeongyang (died 618) (r. 590–618) was the 26th monarch of Goguryeo, the northernmost of the Three Kingdoms of Korea. He was the eldest son of Pyeongwon of Goguryeo (r. 559–590). During his reign, Goguryeo defeated multiple invasions by the Sui dynasty.

== Family ==
- Father: King Pyeongwon (평원왕; 平原王)
  - Grandfather: King Yangwon (양원왕; 陽原王)
- Unknown wife – No issue.

== Reign ==
He is noted for winning consecutive wars against the Sui dynasty between 598 and 614, known as the Goguryeo-Sui Wars. He fended off four Sui campaigns by Emperors Wendi and Yangdi, including the great assault of 612, during which more than a million troops invaded Goguryeo territory.

The Samguk sagi relates that Yeongyang was of unsurpassed charisma and had a magnanimous character, and "made it his undertaking to relieve the sufferings of the world and bring peace to the people". He was named Crown Prince by his father in 566, and he assumed the throne when the monarch died in 590.

Yeongyang's reign took place in the context of heightened rivalry among the Korean Three Kingdoms of Goguryeo, Baekje, and Silla, as well as the unification of China by the Sui and China's growing ambitions. Initially Yeongyang enjoyed cordial relations with Sui, receiving from the Sui emperor Wendi his enfeoffment as king of Goguryeo and attendant "offices and ranks" by tradition granted by Chinese dynasties to tribute monarchs. At the same time, Yeongyang strengthened relations with the Khitan and Mohe tribes to the north, in the preparations for war against China begun by his father.

In 598 however the Wendi grew incensed by a Goguryeo armed incursion into the Liaodong peninsula, a region claimed by Sui and Goguryeo's reinstatement of its "taewang" title as Overlords of the East and as Emperors. It was largely this affront, combined with Sui's own geopolitical ambitions to reestablish the hegemony enjoyed by the Han dynasty, that induced Wendi to launch a 300,000-men invasion of Goguryeo in 598. The 598 Sui invasion was foiled by disease and the weather (a severe storm wreaked havoc on the would-be invasion fleet).

In 607 Emperor Yangdi discovered that Goguryeo was in contact with Yami Qaghan (603–609), khan of the Eastern Turks, an ostensible vassal state to the Sui which supported Goguryeo's hegemony over the Northeast as Overlords of the East. This convinced Yangdi to launch a campaign of 1,133,000 troops by land and sea against the recalcitrant Goguryeo in 612. This too Goguryeo was able to defeat, most notably in the battle of Salsu led by the General Ŭlchi Mundŏk.

In 613, and again in 614, Yangdi issued orders for additional unsuccessful campaigns against Goguryeo. When Yeongyang failed to appear at the Sui court in formal submission another invasion was planned, offset only by domestic turmoil and the subsequent fall of the Sui in 618.

That same year saw the death of Yeongyang, and he was succeeded by his half-brother Go Geon-mu.

In the meanwhile, Goguryeo attacked the southern Korean kingdoms Baekje and Silla in a failed bid to reclaim the Seoul region. Silla, under attack by both Goguryeo and former ally Baekje, reached out to the Sui dynasty. Silla would later ally with Sui's successor, the Tang dynasty, to unite much of the Korean peninsula in 668.)

Yeongyang ordered the compilation of a new history text Sinjip (신집; 新集), although no copies survive today.

== Popular culture ==
- Portrayed by Park Sang-hoon and Kwon Hwa-woon in the 2021 KBS2 TV series River Where the Moon Rises.

== See also ==
- History of Korea
- Three Kingdoms of Korea
- List of Korean monarchs
- Goguryeo-Sui Wars

Yeongyang of Goguryeo House of Go Died: 618
Regnal titles
Preceded by Pyeongwon	Monarch of Goguryeo; 590–618	Succeeded by Yeongnyu
