= Park Sang-hoon =

Park Sang-hoon may refer to:

- Park Sang-hoon (cyclist)
- Park Sang-hoon (actor)
