= Anjang of Goguryeo =

22nd King of Goguryeo Korea (r. 519–531)

Anjang 안장
- Taewang

King of Goguryeo
- Reign: 519 – May 531 A.D.
- Coronation: 519 A.D.
- Predecessor: Munjamyeong
- Successor: Anwon

Crown Prince of Goguryeo
- Reign: January 498 – 519 A.D.
- Coronation: January 498 A.D.
- Predecessor: Georyeon
- Successor: Pyeongseong
- Born: Go Heung-an; December 498 A.D. Pyongyang
- Died: May 531 A.D. Pyongyang
- Issue: Go Bokgwi
Posthumous name
- Anjang Taewang
- House: Go
- Dynasty: Goguryeo
- Father: Munjamyeong
- Religion: Buddhism
- Occupation: King

- Anjang of Goguryeo
- Hangul: 흥안
- Hanja: 興安
- RR: Heungan
- MR: Hŭngan

Monarch name
- Hangul: 안장왕
- Hanja: 安藏王
- RR: Anjangwang
- MR: Anjangwang

Anjang (died 531, r. 519–531) was the 22nd ruler of Goguryeo, the northernmost of the Three Kingdoms of Korea. With his original name of Heung-an, he was the eldest son of Munjamyeong. He was named Crown Prince in the seventh year of Munjamyeong's reign (498), and assumed the throne when his father died in 519. He was supposedly assassinated in 531 without heir, and was succeeded by his younger brother, Anwon.

== Reign ==
Under Anjang, Goguryeo continued to maintain close relations with the Chinese dynasties, notably Wei and Liang with constant 'tribute missions', to counterbalance the volatile relationship with the southerly Korean kingdoms of Baekje and Silla. He attacked Baekje in 523 and 529, slaying more than 2,000 Baekje soldiers.

Historical records during the reign of Anjang are rarely found throughout East Asia with some erroneous marks on his death: the Book of Liang completed in 635 says Anjang died in 526 although the actual date is believed to be about five or six years later; The Japanese chronicle Nihon Shoki quoting Baekje Bongi says Anjang was killed amid bloody chaos, which implies the final years of his reign were unstable. Since chaos also marked the end of his brother Anwon's reign, it is speculated that succession issues had already been entrenched among the Goguryeo aristocracy.

== Family ==
- Father: King Munja (문자명왕; 文咨明王)
  - Grandfather: Prince Joda/Juda (조다; 助多)
- Unknown wife
  - Son: Lord Bokgwi (복귀군; 福貴君) – married a Japanese woman and had a son named Go Bu-ryeon (고부련; 高夫連).

== The Love story of Go Heung-an and Lady Han ==
Among the numerous historical Korean stories, there is the Love story of a Baekje woman and the 22nd Great King of Goguryeo. It shows many parallels to the Western culture's Shakespeare's Romeo and Juliet, and also the story of Prince Hodong and Princess Nangnang, who also had a forbidden love.

== See also ==
- History of Korea
- Three Kingdoms of Korea
- List of Korean monarchs

Anjang of Goguryeo House of Go Died: 531
Regnal titles
Preceded by Munjamyeong	Monarch of Goguryeo; 519–531	Succeeded by Anwon
