= Princess Pyeonggang =

Goguryeo princess

- Princess of Goguryeo
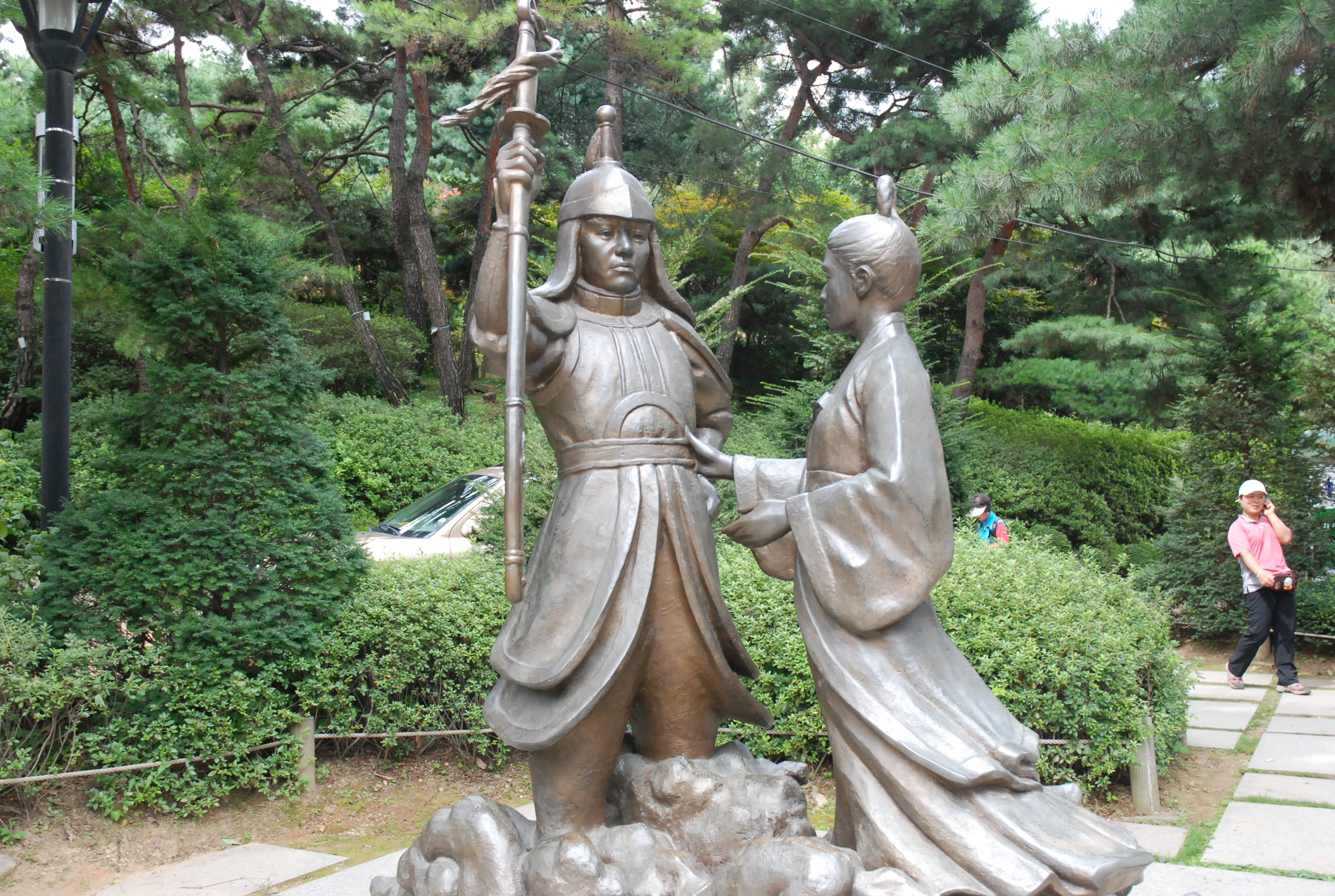
- Statue of On Dal and Princess Pyeonggang at the Achasan entrance
- Died: c.595 Kingdom of Goguryeo
- Spouse: On Dal
- House: Ko
- Father: Pyeongwon of Goguryeo

Korean name
- Hangul: 평강공주
- Hanja: 平岡公主
- RR: Pyeonggang gongju
- MR: P'yŏnggang kongju

Princess Pyeonggang (died c.595) was a Goguryeo Princess as the daughter of King Pyeongwon and sister to King Yeongyang. As told in popular folktales (versions of which exist in many different regions) she married a commoner, On Dal.

According to legend, when Pyeonggang was a little girl and wouldn't stop crying, her father, King Pyeongwan, would jokingly threaten to marry her to On Dal, a beggar boy of low class known as a fool. When Pyeonggang was 16, her father wanted her to marry a son of the noble Go family. Pyeonggang refused, and insisted that she should be married to On Dal - because, she said, her father must keep his word, even to someone with extremely low status like On Dal.

Thereupon, she left the palace and went to the house where On Dal lived with his mother, and insisted upon marrying him. He and his mother were quite confused and frightened, but Pyeonggang prevailed, and she and On Dal were married. They were extremely happy together, and Pyeonggang used her gold to help the family, and taught her husband many useful skills, such as how to select a horse. Eventually, with Pyeonggang's help, On Dal became a renowned general.

== In popular culture ==
- Portrayed by Nam Sang-mi in the 2009 KBS2 TV series Invincible Lee Pyung Kang.
- Portrayed by Jin Ye-ju in the 2017 Netflix TV series My Only Love Song.
- Portrayed by Kim So-hyun, Heo Jung-eun, and Jung Yoon-ha in the 2021 KBS2 TV series River Where The Moon Rises.
