= River Where the Moon Rises =

2021 South Korean television series

- Promotional poster
- Hangul: 달이 뜨는 강
- Lit.: Moon Rising River
- RR: Dari tteuneun gang
- MR: Tari ttŭnŭn kang
- Genre: Period drama; Romance
- Based on: Princess Pyeonggang by Choi Sagyu
- Developed by: Kim Sang-hui (KBS Drama Production)
- Written by: Han Ji-hoon
- Directed by: Yoon Sang-ho
- Starring: Kim So-hyun; Na In-woo; Lee Ji-hoon; Choi Yu-hwa
- Music by: Jeon Jeong-hyeok
- Ending theme: "Become Someone's" by Zia
- Country of origin: South Korea
- Original language: Korean
- No. of episodes: 20

Production
- Executive producers: Kang Byung-taek; Kim Young-jo
- Producers: Jo Yoon-jung; Baek Seung-bin
- Camera setup: Single-camera
- Production company: Victory Contents

Original release
- Network: KBS2
- Release: February 15 – April 20, 2021

River Where the Moon Rises (Korean: 달이 뜨는 강) is a 2021 South Korean television series starring Kim So-hyun, Na In-woo, (Note: The character On Dal was initially played by Ji Soo who was replaced by Na In-woo after 6 episodes into the drama.) Lee Ji-hoon and Choi Yu-hwa. Based on the 2010 novel Princess Pyeonggang by film director and screenwriter Choi Sagyu, it aired on KBS2 from February 15 to April 20, 2021, every Monday and Tuesday at 21:30 (KST). The series is available on Viu with multi-language subtitles, and was submitted for the 2021 International Emmy Awards.

Kim and Na were nominated at the 57th Baeksang Arts Awards for their performance in the drama, with Kim being the youngest nominee for the Best Actress—Television category in the award's history.

== Synopsis ==
The series retells the love story between Princess Pyeonggang and On Dal, characters from a classic Goguryeo folktale. Princess Pyeonggang was born as a princess but raised as an assassin. Upon learning the truth of her origins, she fights to win back her country and rightful throne from the corruption that has taken over. A peace-loving man, On Dal is the exact opposite of the warrior princess. But as the two fall for each other, On Dal finds himself forsaking his principles in order to keep her safe. An endeavor that proves increasingly difficult, as players from all sides converge in a lethal battle for the throne.

== Cast ==
=== Main ===
- Kim So-hyun as Princess Pyeonggang / Yeom Ga-jin
  - Heo Jung-eun as young Princess Pyeonggang
  - Jung Yoon-ha as baby Princess Pyeonggang

A princess determined to be first Queen regnant of Goguryeo and restore the country her father failed.

- Na In-woo as On Dal
  - Seo Dong-hyun as young On Dal

A peace-loving, pure man who goes against his principles in order to protect Princess Pyeonggang.

- Lee Ji-hoon as General Go Geon
  - Park Min-sang as young Go Geon

An elite general who is perfect in every way and longs to make Pyeonggang his.

- Choi Yu-hwa as Hae Mo-yong
  - Moon So-hee as young Hae Mo-yong

A woman who desired to take control of Goguryeo and play with it as she wants. She is the adoptive daughter of Hae Ji-wol and falls in love with Go Geon.

=== Supporting ===
==== Royal Palace ====
- Kim Pub-lae as King Pyeongwon, was originally a benevolent and generous king, but he has gradually changed into a sensitive and suspicious personality. Since then, he has been playing around with Gowon Pyo's tactics and is keeping the palace his.
- Cha Kwang-soo as Jin Pil, father of the second queen Jin-bi and a timid and weak person who depends on his daughter's power.
- Kim Jung-young as Lady Gongson, nanny of Princess Pyeonggang. She is a loyal person who is guarding the empty Gongju Palace (Magnolia Palace) alone, hoping that Princess Pyeonggang, who disappeared 10 years ago will return alive, and then becomes a shadow of Pyeonggang after Pyeonggang comes back alive.
- Kim So-hyun as Queen Yeon, the former Queen of Goguryeo. A brave and intelligent woman, she works to protect Goguryeo from evil tribe leaders but is killed by Go Won-pyo at Sunnobo. She is the mother of Princess Pyeonggang and Prince Go-won.
- Son Woo-hyuk as Head Eunuch, he is a close aide to the King Pyeongwon and the head of eunuchs.
- Ahn Shin-woo as Kim Pyeong-ji, a friend of King Pyeongwon and a servant of Goguryeo. He is a person who does not check his family because he does not have much to see, has no property, and even has no family to protect
- Wang Bit-na as Queen Jin, a figure who won the king's heart with her outstanding beauty and manner. She is the mother of Prince Geon-mu, she seeks the chance to drive out Prince Go-won and make Prince Geon-Mu the king.
- Ki Eun-se as Royal Consort Hyeon, one of King Pyeongwon's concubines.
- Kwon Hwa-woon as Prince Go-won, Princess Pyeonggang's younger brother and the person who encourages On Dal to participate in the war.
  - Park Sang-hoon as young Prince Go-won.

==== Ghost village (Sunnobu Tribe) ====
- Kang Ha-neul as General On Hyeop, the father of On Dal and the head of the Sunno region in Goguryeo. His is a dutiful leader who fulfills his responsibilities for his country and his people. Embodying a sense of charisma and righteousness, he is a revered general of the people who receives support and loyalty from the masses.
- Hwang Young-hee as Lady Sa, the nanny of On Dal. She took care of On Dal after his father's wrongful death and the only remaining family of On Dal.
- Jung Wook as Sa Woon-am, a subordinate general of On Dal's father, General On Hyeop and leader of Sunno tribe after General's death.
- Kim Dong-young as Sa Pung-gae, the son of commander Sa Woon-am and On Dal's childhood friend.
  - Kim Hyun-bin as young Sa Pung-gae
- Oh Ah-rin as Wol-yi, a Baekje refugee and playful child who uplifts everyone in the Ghost village.
- Yoon Ah-jeong as Hong Mae, a maiden that lives in Sunno.
- Lee Sang-chan as Seok Gu. Ran from working at Goon-yeong's barn because the work was too hard, is found by On Dal and is taken to the ghost village, he looks gruff but is very deep-minded and loyal.
- Won Woo as Pil Gu. Ran from the construction site of the Jangan Castle, goes from mountain to mountain and meets On Dal and ends up in the ghost village.

==== Gyeru Tribe ====
- Lee Hae-young as Go Won-pyo, the Gochuga of Gyeru Tribe, a cunning and elaborate politician who boasts a brilliant speech and excellent showmanship. With the conviction that his family should become King of Goguryeo, he takes the lead to dethrone the reign of King Pyeongwon.
- Yoon Joo-man as Go Sang-cheol, Go Won-pyo's right-hand man.

==== Sonobu Tribe ====
- Jung In-gyeom as Hae Ji-wol, head of Sono tribe and one of the most powerful people in Goguryeo.

==== Jeolnobu Tribe ====
- Jasper Cho as Wol Gwang, a monk and former Jeolnobu's greatest fighter who once defended the north.

==== Cheonjubang ====
- Han Jae-young as Du Jung-seo, an expert in witchcraft and the imperial fortune-teller who predicts good and bad fortune of Goguryeo.
- Ryu Ui-hyun as Tarasan, a talkative but clumsy best friend of Princess Pyeonggang and Tarajin's twin brother.
- Kim Hee-jung as Tarajin, a killer who lives with her twin brother Tarasan, in Dorim-hyang, where people abandoned in Goguryeo gather.
- Moon Jin-seung as Ma Tae-mo, a member of the Cheonjubang a group in which Pyeong-gang belongs. He is a cruel murderer without compassion, and is loyal to Du Jung-seo.
- Jung Eun-pyo as Yeom Deuk, adoptive father of Yeom Ga-jin.

==== Silla Kingdom ====
- Kim Bum-suk as Kim Cha-seung
- Kim Seung-soo as Jinheung of Silla

=== Extended ===
- Jung Dong-geun as Il-yeong, Go Geon's escort warrior.
- Jo Bok-rae

== Production ==
=== Development ===
The early working title of the series is Pyeong-gang, Cut to the Heart (평강, 마음에 베이다; Pyeonggang, maeume beida). The series is based on Choi Sagyu's novel Princess Pyeonggang. The novel shows a different perspective on Princess Pyeonggang as an outstanding leader to her country and people, breaking the image of a crying princess and a pleasant-looking wife in the Goguryeo folktale Pyeonggang and Ondal. Choi took 25 years to complete the novel. It is directed by Yoon Sangho, who directed Kingmaker: The Change of Destiny (2020) and written by Han Ji-hoon, who previously wrote Woman of 9.9 Billion (2019). The drama is produced by Victory Contents.

Kim Soung-eun, owner of jewelry brand Naschenka, designed the jewelry featured in the drama including the gold, peony blossom-shaped crown wore by Princess Pyeonggang. On January 27, 2021, Viu revealed River Where the Moon Rises as its latest Viu Original. Virginia Lim, Viu's chief content officer commented: "With an exceptional script and amazing talent, River Where the Moon Rises is not to be missed."

=== Casting ===
The production company Victory Contents conducted a public audition for the drama from August 3–4 to be produced in the second half of 2020. The performers recruiting are male and female actors from 1987 to 2005, skilled in martial arts and sports or have experience in dramas, movies, and performances. On October 30, Victory Contents announced the winner of The Next public audition, actor Jung Dong-geun. He was chosen through 1:1000 candidates.

On August 25, Sports Seoul reported that Son Ye-jin was in talks to star in the series. Following the reports, a source from Son's agency MS Team Entertainment shared, "It's one of the projects she has received offers for, and nothing is decided yet." They continued, "She is currently spurring her advance into Hollywood by affirming her appearance in the Hollywood film The Cross by Andrew Niccol." The same day, it was also reported that Kang Ha-neul was cast as On Dal, but turned down the offer due to a scheduling conflict on September 21. The following day, Kang's agency confirmed his special appearance as General On Hyeop.

On October 5, it was reported that Kim So-hyun had been cast and confirmed as the drama's protagonist. On October 13, it was reported that Ji Soo had received an offer for the role of Ondal, the male protagonist in the drama but was still reviewing it. On October 22, Ji Soo was confirmed to be acting as the male lead On Dal, with Lee Ji-hoon and Choi Yu-hwa joining the cast. The script reading was held on October 23, 2020.

The series reunited actors Kim So-hyun, Ji Soo and Hwang Young-hee who previously acted together in the drama Page Turner. It marked the fourth collaboration of Kim So-Hyun with Hwang Young-hee after 2016 series Page Turner, film Pure Love and 2017 series While You Were Sleeping, and second collaboration with Jung Eun-pyo in 2012 Moon Embracing the Sun. It also reunited Kim So-Hyun and Kim Hee-jung who previously worked together in the 2015 series Who Are You: School 2015. Ji Soo was replaced after allegations of bullying and sexual abuse sparked a scandal. He was replaced with new lead Na In-woo.

=== Filming ===
On November 23, the production of River Where the Moon Rises was suspended as a direct result of the COVID-19 pandemic. It was reported that a supporting actor was identified as close contact with a COVID-19 carrier. Ten crew members who came in contact with the person also underwent voluntary COVID-19 testing. OCN's The Uncanny Counter, which shares the set with the series, decided to cancel their press conference. On November 24, the extra's result was confirmed positive, but all affiliated cast and crew members tested negative. For safety, the production crew practiced self-isolation for one or two more days, observed the situation, and resumed shooting.

After the series ended, Lee Ji-hoon revealed he injured his nose during an action scene, suffering difficulty breathing. He underwent nose surgery on June 29 to treat his deviated septum. Six episodes had already aired; the remaining 14 were reshot with new lead Na In-woo. On March 24, 2021, it was reported that there was a plan to re-film the first six episodes of the show as well, since the original versions with Ji Soo had been taken down. The decision was also influenced by the positive reception to Na In-woo's acting and chemistry with female lead Kim So-hyun despite the circumstances of his casting.

=== Release ===
KBS showed a 40-second pre-release special video at the 2020 KBS Drama Awards on December 31, 2020. A special video part 2 was released on January 8, 2021. A poster released on January 14 features the silhouette of Pyeonggang on a horse with On Dal's face faintly hovering in the sky above her. This reflects Pyeonggang's strong determination to restore and lead Goguryeo and On Dal's love for Pyeonggang and his desire to watch over her. It reads, "On Dal, the general who turned love into history. Princess Pyeonggang, whose life in Goguryeo was everything." The series aired after Royal Secret Agent from February 15, 2021.

== Original soundtrack ==
River Where the Moon Rises (Original Soundtrack)

Soundtrack album by Various artists
- Released: 2021
- Genres: Soundtrack; Ballad; K-pop
- Language: Korean
- Labels: Kakao; Victory Contents

Singles from River Where the Moon Rises
- 1. "Becomes Someone's" Released: February 15, 2021; 2. "Tears of The Moon" Released: February 22, 2021; 3. "Against The Wind" Released: March 1, 2021; 4. "This Is My Way" Released: March 8, 2021; 5. "You Are My Destiny" Released: March 16, 2021; 6. "When I Close My Eyes" Released: March 22, 2021

The following is the official track list of River Where the Moon Rises Original Television Soundtrack album. The tracks with no indicated lyricists and composers are the drama's musical score; the artists indicated for these tracks are the tracks' composers themselves. The album consisting of a total of 22 tracks released digitally on April 13, and physically on April 20.

| No. | Title | Lyrics | Music | Artist | Length |
|---|---|---|---|---|---|
| 1. | "Becomes Someone's" (누군가의 무엇이 되어) | Good Choice; Choi Gap-won | Kim Se-jin | Zia | 3:25 |
| 2. | "Tears of The Moon" (달의 눈물) | Kang Eun-kyung | Cho Young-soo | Kang Tae-kwan | 3:56 |
| 3. | "Against The Wind" (바람이 불어와도) | Yoon Il-sang | Yoon Il-sang | Ahn Ye-eun | 4:19 |
| 4. | "This Is My Way" (이게 내길) | Yoon Il-sang | Yoon Il-sang | Na Yoon-kwon | 3:45 |
| 5. | "You Are My Destiny" (내게 주어진 운명) | Casey | Cho Young-soo | Lily lily | 3:23 |
| 6. | "When I Close My Eyes" (눈을 감고 있으면) | Good Choice; KZ; Kim Hye-kwang; Sue Min | KZ; Kim Hye-kwang; Sue Min; Apicks | Bonggu | 4:16 |
| 7. | "River Where Moon Rises" (달이 뜨는 강) | | | Jeon Jong-hyuk | 3:22 |
| 8. | "Pyeonggang and Ondal" (평강과 온달) | | | Lee Yeon-joo | 2:10 |
| 9. | "Precious Person" (소중한 사람) | | | Kim Soo-hyun | 2:16 |
| 10. | "Moon River" (달과 강의 노래) | | | Kim Young-eun | 3:53 |
| 11. | "I Will Protect You" (내 너희를 지켜주리) | | | Lee Ru-ri | 2:50 |
| 12. | "My Name" | | | Jeon Jong-hyuk | 3:14 |
| 13. | "Just Like A Dream" (마치 꿈처럼) | | | Oh Yea | 2:44 |
| 14. | "Like The Flowing Wind" (흐르는 바람처럼) | | | Kim Moon-jung | 4:47 |
| 15. | "Return" (귀환) | | | Kim Young-eun | 2:36 |
| 16. | "Cheonjubang" (천주방) | | | Kim Soo-hyun | 3:14 |
| 17. | "Assassin" (자객) | | | Choi Jin-woo | 3:27 |
| 18. | "A Wait You" (기다림) | | | Cho Hye-rin | 1:56 |
| 19. | "Invisible Enemy" (보이지 않는 적) | | | Park Min-joo | 3:18 |
| 20. | "The Dark Shadow" (검은 그림자) | | | Jeon Jong-hyuk | 5:45 |
| 21. | "Song Of Mom" (부모의 노래) | | | Heoseok | 00:56 |
| 22. | "Resurrection Of The Sword" (검의 부활) | | | Kim Moon-jung; Jeon Jong-hyuk | 1:32 |
| Total length: | | | | | 60:11 |

River Where the Moon Rises Singles from Parts 1–6

Part 1

Released on February 15, 2021
| No. | Title | Lyrics | Music | Artist | Length |
|---|---|---|---|---|---|
| 1. | "Become Someone's" (누군가의 무엇이 되어) | Good Choice; Choi Gap-won | Kim Se-jin | Zia | 3:23 |
| 2. | "Become Someone's" (Inst.) | | Kim Se-jin | | 3:23 |
| Total length: | | | | | 6:46 |

Part 2

Released on February 22, 2021
| No. | Title | Lyrics | Music | Artist | Length |
|---|---|---|---|---|---|
| 1. | "Tears Of The Moon" (달의 눈물) | Kang Eun-kyung | Cho Young-soo | Kang Tae-kwan | 3:56 |
| 2. | "Tears Of The Moon" (Inst.) | | Cho Young-soo | | 3:56 |
| Total length: | | | | | 7:52 |

Part 3

Released on March 1, 2021
| No. | Title | Lyrics | Music | Artist | Length |
|---|---|---|---|---|---|
| 1. | "Against The Wind" (바람이 불어와도) | Yoon Il-sang | Yoon Il-sang | Ahn Ye-eun | 4:19 |
| 2. | "Against The Wind" (Inst.) | | Yoon Il-sang | | 4:19 |
| Total length: | | | | | 8:38 |

Part 4

Released on March 8, 2021
| No. | Title | Lyrics | Music | Artist | Length |
|---|---|---|---|---|---|
| 1. | "This Is My Way" (이게 내길) | Yoon Il-sang | Yoon Il-sang | Na Yoon-kwon | 3:45 |
| 2. | "This Is My Way" (Inst.) | | Yoon Il-sang | | 3:45 |
| Total length: | | | | | 7:30 |

Part 5

Released on March 16, 2021
| No. | Title | Lyrics | Music | Artist | Length |
|---|---|---|---|---|---|
| 1. | "Fate is Given to Me" | Casey | Cho Young-soo | Lily lily | 3:23 |
| 2. | "Fate given to me" (Inst.) | | Cho Young-soo | | 3:23 |
| Total length: | | | | | 6:46 |

Part 6

Released on March 22, 2021
| No. | Title | Lyrics | Music | Artist | Length |
|---|---|---|---|---|---|
| 1. | "When You Close Your Eyes" (눈을 감고 있으면) | Good Choice; KZ; Kim Hye-kwang; Sue Min | KZ; Kim Hye-kwang; Sue Min; Apicks | Bonggu | 4:16 |
| 2. | "When You Close Your Eyes" (Inst.) | | KZ; Kim Hye-kwang; Sue Min; Apicks | | 4:16 |
| Total length: | | | | | 8:32 |

== Episodes ==
| No. | Title | Directed by | Written by | Original release date | South Korea viewers (millions) |
|---|---|---|---|---|---|
| 1 | "Episode 1" | Yoon Sang-ho | Han Ji-hoon | February 15, 2021 | 1.716 |
Go Won-pyo (Lee Hae-young) of the Gyerubu tribe comes before King Pyeongwon (Kim Pub-rae) and threatens him with his private army for the exclusive rights to salt despite the King's unrest. Queen Yeon (Kim So-hyun) leaves for patrol taking young Princess Pyeonggang (Heo Jung-eun) with her. Meanwhile, General On Hyeop (Kang Ha-neul) the chief of the Sunno tribe tests his son's manhood. While Queen Yeon visits On Hyeop, Won-pyo arrives on King Pyeongwon's decree. He describes King Pyeongwon as 'a great man like a glass bowl' and manipulates him, and even unfolds a secret scheme. As a result, the King suspects a relationship between Queen Yeon and Wol Gwang (Jasper Cho) and gives the command to Won Pyo to kill the Queen. Princess Pyeonggang escapes with On Dal's help as General On Hyeop and Queen Yeon confront Go Won-pyo. Meanwhile, the jealous King looks for Wol Gwang and kills more people.
| 2 | "Episode 2" | Yoon Sang-ho | Han Ji-hoon | February 16, 2021 | 1.742 |
Eight years later, Yeom Ga-jin (Kim So-hyun) goes on an expedition to complete her last mission--to assassinate King Pyeongwon. On her way to the palace, she overhears poachers and saves On Dal's (Na In-woo) life while hunting for deer, and they go separate ways. In the palace, Won-pyo prepares an attack on the King during the farewell ceremony for the late Queen Yeon. After failing to assassinate the King, Ga Jin runs away to the mountain and fell in agony remembering her memories of her mother. Dal saves Ga Jin and nurses her back to health. While she recuperates, her companions hear about her failed attempt and search for her. When she is found, they remind her of their rule to kill anyone who sees their face or marry him and make him one of them. Meanwhile, Go Won-pyo tells his son, Go Geon, to protect the palace.
| 3 | "Episode 3" | Yoon Sang-ho | Han Ji-hoon | February 22, 2021 | 1.629 |
Ga Jin returns to Cheonjubang after hearing her father, Yeom Deuk (Jung Eun-pyo) is in trouble due to her failing mission to assassinate King Pyeongwon. On her return, Doo Joon-seo releases her father but instead, she is held captive after she asks about her past. Dal hears of Ga Jin predicament and rushes to save her and takes Ga Jin to Mount Jangbaek where the owner of a medicinal herb store owner resides, believing the owner knows everything that happened in and outside of the palace and the court lady that Ga Jin was looking for. She later finds Hae Mo-yong (Choi Yu-hwa) and asks about Lady Gong-son (Kim Jung-young). Meanwhile, a composite sketch of the assassin who attempts to kill the King is shown to the herb owner by General Go Geon (Lee Ji-hoon).
| 4 | "Episode 4" | Yoon Sang-ho | Han Ji-hoon | February 23, 2021 | 1.747 |
King Pyeongwon believes he is seeing the ghost of Princess Pyeonggang as she stands in front of him in the flesh. However, Ga Jin escapes with help from Go Geon who she remembers but not without being warned of her fate if she returns as an assassin. Meanwhile, hanging upside down, Dal waits for her return. Dal brings Ga Jin to Ghost Valley, and the villagers welcome her and fix up a house for her to stay. However, she soon learns that Dal is the son of General On Hyeop who had lost his life along with many Sunno Tribe members due to her father, King Pyeongwon. She decides to leave and stands at the edge of a cliff, wanting to end her life.
| 5 | "Episode 5" | Yoon Sang-ho | Han Ji-hoon | March 1, 2021 | 1.618 |
Go Geon reports to King Pyeongwon that Princess Pyeonggang is alive, showing him the jade necklace as proof. He promises to bring her back safely to the palace without his father, Go Won Pyo, knowing about it. Meanwhile, Ga Jin tries to change Dal's heavy conscience as he turns his back on her. After conspiring with Go Geon, Hae Mo Young, the owner of the herb store, brings a body of a woman who could be the King's assassin to Go Won Pyo. Although Go Geon confirms it to be the Princess, Go Won Pyo thinks otherwise. Meanwhile, Ga Jin helps Dal dig a well for the village, and Du Jung Seo sends San and Jin on a mission to kill Go Won Pyo.
| 6 | "Episode 6" | Yoon Sang-ho | Han Ji-hoon | March 2, 2021 | 1.496 |
Dal and Ga Jin strike water and bring joy to Ghost Valley. However, despite the happiness, Ga Jin comes face to face with Du Jung Seo who tells her about the twins. She is left to decide whether to save them and break her promise of not killing again. Meanwhile, Go Won Pyo gives three hundred mounted men and three hundred soldiers to Go Geon after seeing King Pyeongwon. Dal sees Ga Jin at the Capital, dressed in her assassin's attire and sword. She tells him she is there to save her friends who are faced with the death penalty. He and Pung Gae help her, but amid the rescue, Dal gets captured. To save his life, Ga Jin reveals her identity. Meanwhile, Go Geon returns empty-handed on his mission to kill Du Jeong Seo.
| 7 | "Episode 7" | Yoon Sang-ho | Han Ji-hoon | March 8, 2021 | 1.509 |
Dal gets released from holding and reunites with Pung Gae, Weol, and the Tara twins while Ga Jin returns to being the Princess. Although they all are astonished at her royal descent, Dal believes she will return to them. Meanwhile, Go Won Pyo meets Hae Mo Young and plots to hurt the Princess. Ga Jin accuses Mo Yong of supplying poisoned medicine to the Crown Prince in front of the King and his royal subjects, but she is proved otherwise. The King orders Ga Jin to ground herself in her chamber. However, she leaves the palace and voluntarily joins a group of women who are about to be sold off to Silla as tributes.
| 8 | "Episode 8" | Yoon Sang-ho | Han Ji-hoon | March 9, 2021 | 1.448 |
Thanks to Geon and Dal's help, Ga Jin manages to save the women from being sold off to Silla. After returning to the palace, Ga Jin suggests that the King should punish Hae Ji Weol for trying to sell the women as contributes to Silla. Meanwhile, Gochuga tells Geon that he doesn't have to leave for the borderline. Guchuga comes up with a scheme that makes Ga Jin and Geon marry. As Ga Jin and the King don't agree with the marriage, Gochuga threatens the King. Meanwhile, Mo Yong tells Hae Ji Weol that they should do something to stop the marriage in order to prevent Gochuga from gaining more power.
| 9 | "Episode 9" | Yoon Sang-ho | Han Ji-hoon | March 15, 2021 | 1.486 |
The candidates for the royal wedding are called into the palace. However, it is Gochuga's plan to make Ga Jin and Geon get married. Dal hides his identity and sneaks into the palace, but he gets caught by Geon. The King calls in Ga Jin and demands an explanation about their relationship. Ga Jin lies to the king that they are already married, and the king tells her to leave the palace. Ga Jin leaves the palace and heads to the Ghost Valley with Dal. On her way, she goes to see Mo Yong and asks for help. Mo Yong promises to keep Ga Jin updated regarding the King and the Crown Prince. Geon finds Dal and has a duel with him, but Ga Jin appears on time and tells him to let go of her. Meanwhile, Ga Jin and Dal arrive at the Ghost Valley as a married couple.
| 10 | "Episode 10" | Yoon Sang-ho | Han Ji-hoon | March 16, 2021 | 1.513 |
Ga Jin and Dal come to Ghost Valley to live with Lady Sa. They lie to her that they are now married, hiding the fact that they are there to train Dal in swordsmanship. However, Lady Sa has a hard time accepting the princess as her daughter-in-law. Meanwhile, Geon becomes the Crown Prince's trainer, but the young prince refuses to leave his chambers. At Ga Jin's request, Lady Sa starts giving Ga Jin all sorts of household chores befitting her new role as a daughter-in-law. In the meantime, Ga Jin trains Dal in swordsmanship and military tactics in secret. Meanwhile, Mo Yong finds herself in trouble after seeking out a fortune-teller, and Geon finally gets the Crown Prince to begin training with him.
| 11 | "Episode 11" | Yoon Sang-ho | Han Ji-hoon | March 22, 2021 | 1.491 |
Despite Lady Sa's anger at Dal's decision to train in swordsmanship, he is determined to become a general like his father. Soon, his skills surpass the level at which Ga Jin can train him. She suggests that Dal go to study with a new master, and the pair set off to find him. Meanwhile, Mo Yong and the chief of Cheonjubang convince Royal Consort Hyeon to do a ritual. Ga Jin gathers enough money to build a stable and buys some horses for the Sunno Tribe army. She informs King Pyeongwon of her plans, then meets with Mo Yong. However, Geon hears of Ga Jin's visit to the herb store and goes to see what they are up to himself. Meanwhile, Dal stays in a cave where he must train his mind before his new master allows him to train with a sword.
| 12 | "Episode 12" | Yoon Sang-ho | Han Ji-hoon | March 23, 2021 | 1.415 |
After saving Ga Jin and Lady Sa by killing the men sent by Go Won Pyo, Dal falls into a state of shock. In order to help him find his path again, Ga Jin speaks to Un Am and Lady Sa about General On's wishes for Dal. Meanwhile, Geon corners Mo Yong with his knowledge of her identity. Then Mo Yong is asked to carry out a dangerous task by Gochuga. Geon tells Mo Yong to make the poison as his father demanded so that she may not fall in danger, but he also tells her to prepare an antidote. Mo Yong comes up with a plan to get the antidote to the King on time. Meanwhile, soldiers of the Gyeru Tribe attack the Sunno Tribe. Pung Gae and Jin are captured, along with several others. Ga Jin must find a way to save them.
| 13 | "Episode 13" | Yoon Sang-ho | Han Ji-hoon | March 29, 2021 | 1.563 |
The Northern Zhou army marches ferociously down south. Bearing his weak body, King Pyeongwon calls upon all tribes to battle. The Sunno Tribe also stands up for war, whereas Gochuga sees this as an opportunity to fulfill his desire. Goguryeo faces a vast danger that will decide the fate of the nation. The only solution is for the five tribes to unite and fight as one. Ga Jin follows the general of the Northern Zhou Mercenary Army and pretends to surrender. Dal and the others must find a way to get Ga Jin back to safety and to take down General Wibalta. As the Sunno Tribe army engages in a bloody battle that Gochuga practically pushed them into, King Pyeongwon worries about his daughter's safety.
| 14 | "Episode 14" | Yoon Sang-ho | Han Ji-hoon | March 30, 2021 | 1.443 |
Du Jung Seo poisons King Pyeongwon and Crown Prince Won, but Ga Jin and Dal save them just in time. As the King orders the incident never be spoken of, Ga Jin suspects the Queen's intentions. Meanwhile, the people of Sunno Tribe prepare to move the Pyongyang Castle, but Lady Sa refuses to go with Dal. Ga Jin and Lord Sa plan to have the Sunno Tribe get exclusive rights to sell salt and to have the Jeollo Tribe rejoin the Five Tribe Council. Meanwhile, Ga Jin is busy taking care of affairs that she grows inattentive to Dal who is somewhat struggling to adjust to palace life. As Ga Jin finds proof of the Queen's impropriety, Mo Yong disappears from the capital.
| 15 | "Episode 15" | Yoon Sang-ho | Han Ji-hoon | April 5, 2021 | 1.305 |
The Princess succeeds in luring Go Won Pyo and the Queen into her trap. In return for not exposing the two, she demands one thing from each of them. Slowly gaining power within the palace, the Princess falls deeply into the concern of how to deal with the Go Family. However, the Go Family's response still seems unpredictable. Ga Jin becomes suspicious of Mo Yong's loyalty and confronts her about whose command she follows. Geon sides with Mo Yong, resulting in both of them losing the Princess' trust. Despite Dal's efforts to help Ga Jin feel more at ease, the Princess' worries continue to grow. Meanwhile, Gochuga puts his plans of revolt into action.
| 16 | "Episode 16" | Yoon Sang-ho | Han Ji-hoon | April 6, 2021 | 1.459 |
Dal volunteers to lead the troops to Hwangju Fortress and subdue the revolt that has broken out. However, when Ga Jin shows up after the fighting has subsided, she and Dal argue about how to proceed from there. Meanwhile, the news of more revolts at other fortresses arrives, and Gochuga bides his time to attack the palace. Gochuga decides that it is time to attack the palace when he hears that the King has asked for medicine to soothe his anxiety. However, when the King summons him to the palace, he realizes that things are not what he expected. Meanwhile, the lords of the other tribes are at a crossroads about which side they should take, and Dal returns to the palace, shaken from battle.
| 17 | "Episode 17" | Yoon Sang-ho | Han Ji-hoon | April 12, 2021 | 1.321 |
Go Won Pyo and his son are thrown in prison. As they await their punishment, a small moment of peace finds its way to the palace. Meanwhile, Lady Sa takes a journey to the capital to visit Dal for the first time in a while. However, not long after her visit, Tara Jin (Kim Hee-jung) comes by with news of an attack against the palace. Pyeonggang and Dal prepare for battle and whatever fate may come. As King Pyeongwon tries to escape from the palace, the Go Family stands in their way with the help of the Cheonjubang. Having to protect her family from the Go Family, Pyeonggang draws her sword against Go Won Pyo while Dal gives the fight that he promised to Go Geon. The fight to decide the future of the two families ensues.
| 18 | "Episode 18" | Yoon Sang-ho | Han Ji-hoon | April 13, 2021 | 1.480 |
It is now four years after Gochuga's death, and Crown Prince Won sits on the throne of Goguryeo. Pyeonggang fights war after war to help the young king, but her brother seems to misunderstand her intentions. Meanwhile, Dal lives like a hermit in the woods, and Geon lives as a drunkard in Silla. However, he suddenly decides to return to Goguryeo. Pyeonggang goes to the mountain where Dal lives in hiding. Despite their longing for one another, they realize that they have different paths to take. Meanwhile, Geon and Mo Yong show up in Goguryeo as the envoys from Silla. With everyone in an uproar, Pyeonggang tries to dissuade her brother from taking rash actions against Geon.
| 19 | "Episode 19" | Yoon Sang-ho | Han Ji-hoon | April 19, 2021 | 1.488 |
Go Geon comes back to Goguryeo as an envoy of Silla. As the palace of Pyongyang is in a state of unrest with his presence, King Yeongyang thinks deeply of what to do with him. Meanwhile, On Dal lives lonely in the mountains until he hears some unexpected news. Not knowing the true intentions that Go Geon holds, the tension within Pyongyang palace thickens. On Dal sets off from the mountains to save Pyeonggang from execution. Although he manages to get there in time, he makes a promise with the King in return for the Princess' safety. Meanwhile, in Silla, Go Geon tries to persuade King Jinheung in order to attack Goguryeo with Silla's armies. The two empires now grow restless in the midst of war.
| 20 | "Episode 20" | Yoon Sang-ho | Han Ji-hoon | April 20, 2021 | 1.320 |
King Yeongyang decides to send reinforcements to Adan Fortress where Pyeonggang and Dal fight to defend it. Dal commands Pyeonggang and Jin to take the wounded back to Pyongyang Castle, but Pyeonggang has plans of her own. As he awaits the Silla army to attack, Dal receives a letter from King Jinheung instead. Pyeonggang escapes the Silla army camp with Mo Yong and Geon. Dal rushes to save Pyeonggang, but when he arrives, Geon is fatally wounded. Leaving the two behind, Pyeonggang and Dal return to Adan Fortress. As they near their troops, they hear Goguryeo's trumpet of victory. However, they are soon faced with an ambush.

== Reception ==
=== Critical response ===
Lee Do-hak, an expert on Korean history and a professor at the Korea University of Traditional Culture described the series as "it is not a story but real history" as the drama shifts from 'The Story of Pyeonggang' to 'The Story of Ondal' [...] with the message that Ondal consistently emphasizes in his story is 'keeping promises'." He also said the drama "shows the genres of various historical dramas centered on one person named Pyeonggang, where the reality and dreams of current youth are projected. It depicts the aspects of war and political historical dramas reflecting the characteristics of the times of Goguryeo, while at the same time portraying the growing drama of Peace and Ondal, as well as the youth melodrama. These various fun elements are the reason why 'River of the Rising Moon' has gained a wide audience of various generations." Despite Na In-woo sudden appearance on the drama, Professor Lee praised him for "adjust[ing] the awkwardness through filming" and Kim So-hyun for her great effort in "growing him as an actor by matching the newly-introduced Na In-woo, just as Pyeonggang grew Ondal in the drama". He concluded by saying that "The River Where the Moon Rises is a historical drama with an amazing story that has never been seen before.

=== Viewership ===
River Where the Moon Rises : South Korea viewers per episode (millions)

| Season | Episode number | | | | | | | | | | | | | | | | | | | | Average |
| Season | 1 | 2 | 3 | 4 | 5 | 6 | 7 | 8 | 9 | 10 | 11 | 12 | 13 | 14 | 15 | 16 | 17 | 18 | 19 | 20 | Average |
|---|---|---|---|---|---|---|---|---|---|---|---|---|---|---|---|---|---|---|---|---|---|
| 1 | 1.716 | 1.742 | 1.629 | 1.747 | 1.618 | 1.496 | 1.509 | 1.448 | 1.486 | 1.513 | 1.491 | 1.415 | 1.563 | 1.443 | 1.305 | 1.459 | 1.321 | 1.480 | 1.488 | 1.320 | 1.509 |

Source: Audience measurement performed nationwide by Nielsen Korea.

Average TV viewership ratings
| Ep. | Part | Original broadcast date | Average audience share (Nielsen Korea) | |
| Ep. | Part | Original broadcast date | Nationwide | Seoul |
|---|---|---|---|---|
| 1 | 1 | February 15, 2021 | 6.5% (16th) | —N/a |
| 1 | 2 | February 15, 2021 | 9.4% (5th) | 8.8% (8th) |
| 2 | 1 | February 16, 2021 | 5.8% (16th) | —N/a |
| 2 | 2 | February 16, 2021 | 9.7% (7th) | 8.9% (7th) |
| 3 | 1 | February 22, 2021 | 6.4% (13th) | 6.3% (13th) |
| 3 | 2 | February 22, 2021 | 9.2% (5th) | 8.4% (10th) |
| 4 | 1 | February 23, 2021 | 6.3% (14th) | 6.2% (13th) |
| 4 | 2 | February 23, 2021 | 10.0% (6th) | 9.8% (4th) |
| 5 | 1 | March 1, 2021 | 6.5% (18th) | —N/a |
| 5 | 2 | March 1, 2021 | 8.8% (6th) | 7.9% (10th) |
| 6 | 1 | March 2, 2021 | 6.6% (9th) | 6.3% (14th) |
| 6 | 2 | March 2, 2021 | 9.2% (6th) | 8.6% (6th) |
| 7 | 1 | March 8, 2021 (Note: Episode 7 and 8, which aired on March 8 and 9, 2021 respectively, had re-edited scenes that included Ji Soo and some newly shot scenes of Na In-woo as On Dal. The drama is to re-film from episode 9 onwards.) | 6.7% (12th) | 6.3% (15th) |
| 7 | 2 | March 8, 2021 | 8.7% (6th) | 8.2% (6th) |
| 8 | 1 | March 9, 2021 | 6.1% (14th) | 5.8% (15th) |
| 8 | 2 | March 9, 2021 | 8.3% (6th) | 7.3% (6th) |
| 9 | 1 | March 15, 2021 | 6.6% (13th) | 6.1% (15th) |
| 9 | 2 | March 15, 2021 | 8.4% (6th) | 7.8% (7th) |
| 10 | 1 | March 16, 2021 | 7.2% (8th) | 7.0% (9th) |
| 10 | 2 | March 16, 2021 | 9.1% (5th) | 9.0% (4th) |
| 11 | 1 | March 22, 2021 | 7.3% (12th) | 6.6% (12th) |
| 11 | 2 | March 22, 2021 | 8.7% (6th) | 7.6% (9th) |
| 12 | 1 | March 23, 2021 | 6.8% (12th) | 6.1% (14th) |
| 12 | 2 | March 23, 2021 | 8.1% (6th) | 7.1% (8th) |
| 13 | 1 | March 29, 2021 | 6.8% (12th) | 5.9% (18th) |
| 13 | 2 | March 29, 2021 | 8.7% (5th) | 7.4% (9th) |
| 14 | 1 | March 30, 2021 | 6.4% (13th) | 5.7% (13th) |
| 14 | 2 | March 30, 2021 | 8.4% (5th) | 7.6% (5th) |
| 15 | 1 | April 5, 2021 | 6.7% (9th) | 6.2% (10th) |
| 15 | 2 | April 5, 2021 | 7.8% (6th) | 7.2% (6th) |
| 16 | 1 | April 6, 2021 | 6.0% (12th) | 5.1% (18th) |
| 16 | 2 | April 6, 2021 | 7.8% (6th) | 6.5% (6th) |
| 17 | 1 | April 12, 2021 | 6.7% (14th) | —N/a |
| 17 | 2 | April 12, 2021 | 8.4% (7th) | 6.7% (12th) |
| 18 | 1 | April 13, 2021 | 6.6% (11th) | 5.7% (13th) |
| 18 | 2 | April 13, 2021 | 8.4% (6th) | 7.5% (6th) |
| 19 | 1 | April 19, 2021 | 6.8% (10th) | 5.7% (15th) |
| 19 | 2 | April 19, 2021 | 8.3% (5th) | 6.9% (8th) |
| 20 | 1 | April 20, 2021 | 6.8% (9th) | 5.6% (16th) |
| 20 | 2 | April 20, 2021 | 8.3% (6th) | 7.3% (6th) |
| Average | | | 7.6% | — (Note: Due to some ratings not recorded, the exact average rating is unknown.) |
In the table above, the blue numbers represent the lowest ratings and the red numbers represent the highest ratings.; NR denotes that the series did not rank in the top 20 daily programs on that date.; N/A denotes that the rating is not known.

== Controversy ==
=== Backlash from Chinese netizens about hanbok origin ===
On February 13, 2021, Kim So-hyun was heavily criticized by Chinese internet users regarding Kim Instagram's photo of herself taken at a drama set wearing a Hanbok, in which she wished her followers, "Everyone, have a safe and warm Happy Lunar New Year". The post was flooded with claims that the Korean traditional costume she was wearing was a Chinese traditional costume known as Hanfu, with several Chinese netizens calling South Korea a "thief country". Afterwards, Rapper E Sens and singer Song Ga-in expressed their anger at the so-called 'hanbok remarks'. E Sens wrote a direct remark about the issue on his Instagram story, and Song posted a picture of herself wearing a Hanbok with the caption "Kimchi and Hanbok are our country's, please!". Using the hashtags, 'love kimchi' and 'love hanbok'.

=== Ji Soo's alleged involvement in school violence and subsequent dismissal by KBS2 ===
On March 3, 2021, school violence rumours surrounding actor Ji Soo circulated online. Through a handwritten letter, Ji Soo admitted to the school bullying rumours and apologized to those who have been hurt by his past actions and those involved in the production of the currently ongoing drama. However, he denied committing the alleged sexual assaults among these allegations, which also including extorting the students of their money, fighting and proxy testing. Ji Soo was one of the many people from the entertainment industry who were accused of being a school bully in their school days since February 2021, in which the list of people also included Park Hye-su, Jo Byeong-kyu, (G)I-dle's Soojin and Shim Eun-woo, who either denied the allegations or apologised to the victims.

The following day, a KBS representative shared that filming scheduled for March 4 was cancelled due to Ji Soo's ongoing school violence controversy. On March 5, Ji Soo was removed as a cast member from the drama. Later that day, it was confirmed that Ji Soo was replaced by Na In-woo from episode 7 onwards. The production had completed filming 90% of the drama when the allegations first arose. On March 24, a plan was proposed by the production team to re-film the first six episodes of the show (which included Ji Soo) in light of Na In-woo's replacement of the actor and the expressed public interest by existing viewers to rewatch the first six episodes and new viewers to watch the previous episodes, as well as the positive reception to Na's acting and chemistry with female lead Kim So-hyun despite the circumstances of his casting. The production team also promised to release the first six re-filmed episodes through the online broadcasting platforms and VODs as soon as possible. In a post-drama interview, Lee Ji-hoon said that it took him around 3 days to complete the reshoots with Na In-woo while Kim So-hyun, who had the most scenes with the male lead, underwent one more month of filming to complete the re-shoots.

Cast members Lee Ji-hoon, Wang Bit-na, Ki Eun-se, Kim Hee-jung and Yoon Joo-man offered to participate in the re-shoots without payment. It was later revealed two months after the drama end, Kim So-hyun also participated in the re-shoots without payment out of love and affection for the drama and her character.

On April 2, 2021, the show's production company is currently pending a lawsuit against Ji Soo and his management agency KeyEast regarding the damages caused to the drama, which totalled up to around 3 billion won as a result of the bullying scandal caused by Ji Soo. They stated that they earlier tried to seek compensation from KeyEast but to no avail due to the non-cooperation of the agency.

== Awards and nominations ==
Name of the award ceremony, year presented, category, nominee of the award, and the result of the nomination
| Award ceremony | Year | Category | Nominee | Result | Ref. |
|---|---|---|---|---|---|
| Baeksang Arts Awards | 2021 | Best Actress – Television | Kim So-hyun | Nominated | |
| Baeksang Arts Awards | 2021 | Best New Actor – Television | Na In-woo | Nominated | |
| KBS Drama Awards | 2021 | Top Excellence Award, Actress | Kim So-hyun | Won | |
| KBS Drama Awards | 2021 | Excellence Award, Actress in a Miniseries | Kim So-hyun | Nominated | |
| KBS Drama Awards | 2021 | Best Supporting Actress | Hwang Young-hee | Nominated | |
| KBS Drama Awards | 2021 | Best New Actor | Na In-woo | Won | |
| KBS Drama Awards | 2021 | Best Young Actor | Park Sang-hoon | Nominated | |
| KBS Drama Awards | 2021 | Popularity Award, Actress | Kim So-hyun | Won | |
| KBS Drama Awards | 2021 | Best Couple Award | Kim So-hyun and Na In-woo | Won | |
| Korea Broadcasting Awards | 2021 | Best TV Drama | River Where the Moon Rises | Won | |
| Korea Broadcasting Awards | 2021 | Best Actress | Kim So-hyun | Won | |
| Korea Broadcasting Awards | 2021 | Popularity Award – Actor | Kim So-hyun | Won | |
| Korea Broadcasting Awards | 2021 | Popularity Award – Actor | Na In-woo | Nominated | |
