= Choi Yu-hwa =

South Korean actress

- Born: October 10, 1985 (age 41); South Korea
- Occupation: Actress

Korean name
- Hangul: 최유화
- Hanja: 崔有華
- RR: Choe Yuhwa
- MR: Ch'oe Yuhwa

Choi Yu-hwa (Korean: 최유화; born October 10, 1985) is a South Korean actress. Choi entered the entertainment industry after winning the Fashion Model Award at the fashion magazine CeCi's Model Contest in 2005. She debuted in the one-act Drama Special "The Great Gye Choon-bin" (2010), and in the television series My Princess (2011), she gained attention for her looks and acting ability.

== Filmography ==
=== Film ===
Year	Title	Role
2012	Love Fiction	Min-ji/Veronica
2012	Love Call	So-young
2013	My Dear Girl, Jin-young	Kim Ja-young
2015	C'est si bon	Senior actress
2015	Love Never Fails	Jung-hye
2016	The Truth Beneath	Son So-ra
2016	Worst Woman	Hyun-kyung
2016	The Age of Shadows	Kim Sa-Hee
2019	Tazza: One Eyed Jack	Madonna

=== Television series ===
Year	Title	Role	Network
2010	KBS Drama Special: "The Great Gye Choon-bin"	Kim Yang	KBS2
2011	My Princess	Kang Sun-ah	MBC
2012	Take Care of Us, Captain	Jang Sa-rang	SBS
2012	KBS Drama Special: "Do I Look Like a Pushover?"	Oh Yoo-ni	KBS2
2013	KBS Drama Special: "Like a Fairytale"	Kim Myung-je	KBS2
2017	Hello, My Twenties! 2	Moon Hyo-jin	JTBC
2018	Suits	Jei	KBS2
2018	Mistress	Jin Hye-rim	OCN
2018	Life	Choi Seo-hyun	JTBC
2019	Class of Lies	Cha Hyeon-jeong	OCN
2020	My Dangerous Wife	Jin Sun-mi	MBN
2021	River Where the Moon Rises	Hae Mo-yong	KBS2
2022	Jinxed at First	Cameo	KBS2
2023	The Killing Vote	Chae Do-hee	SBS
2024	Doubt	Kim Seong-hui	MBC

=== Web series ===
No	Title	Role	Notes	Ref.
2021	Bitten Sisters	Lee Ji-yeon	Coloque seu canal bonito	
2024	The Bequeathed	Han Na-Rae	Netflix miniseries, 6 episodes	
