= Kwon Hwa-woon =

South Korean actor (born 1989)

- Born: July 28, 1989 (age 36); Busan, South Korea
- Education: Kyonggi University (Department of Acting)
- Occupation: Actor
- Years active: 2012–present
- Agent: 935 Entertainment

Korean name
- Hangul: 권화운
- Hanja: 權華夽
- RR: Gwon Hwaun
- MR: Kwŏn Hwaun

Former stage name
- Hangul: 권시현
- RR: Gwon Sihyeon
- MR: Kwŏn Sihyŏn
- Website: 935ent.kwonhwawoon

Kwon Hwa-woon is a South Korean actor. He is known for his roles in Lie After Lie, Sky Castle, Doctor John, Zombie Detective and Mouse. He also appeared in movie Northern Limit Line as Corporal Kim Seung-hyun.

== Filmography ==
=== Film ===
Year	Title	Role	Ref.
2012	Gap and Autumn and Bottle	Jeong-gap	
2015	Northern Limit Line	Corporal Kim Seung-hyun	
2019	Immigration	Han Sung-du	
2020	Method acting	Convenience store manager	

=== Television series ===
Year	Title	Role	Ref.
2013	Princess Aurora	Ho-joon	
2014	Birth of a Beauty	Team leader Choi	
2015	The Scholar Who Walks the Night	Hyun-gyu	
2015	Six Flying Dragons	Hwang Hui	
2016	Secrets of Women	Kang Ji-chan	
2017	Oh, the Mysterious	Hyeon Jin-gyeom	
2018	Switch	Jo Sung-doo	
2018	Sky Castle	Lee Choong-sun	
2019	Doctor John	Heo-joon	
2020	Lie After Lie	Kim Yeon-joon	
2020	Zombie Detective	Cha Do-hyun	
2021	Mouse	Sung Yo-han	
2021	River Where the Moon Rises	King Yeongyang	
2021	Please Check the Event	Park Do-kyun	
2024	The Brave Yong Su-jeong	Joo Woo-jin	

== Theater ==
Year	English title	Korean title	Role	Ref.
2022–2023	The Seagull	갈매기	Trebleev	

== Awards and nominations ==
Name of the award ceremony, year presented, category, nominee of the award, and the result of the nomination
Award ceremony	Year	Category	Nominee / Work	Result	Ref.
MBC Drama Awards	2021	Excellence Award, Actor in a Short Drama	Check Out the Event	Nominated	
27th KBS Entertainment	2020	Best Challenge Award	Zombie Detective	Won	
