= My Military Valentine =

2024 South Korean television series

- Promotional poster
- Hangul: 피타는 연애
- Lit.: Bloody Romance
- RR: Pitaneun yeonae
- MR: P'it'anŭn yŏnae
- Genre: Romance
- Written by: Kwon Hee-kyung; Park Hyun-jin
- Directed by: Park Kwang-chun
- Starring: Nam Gyu-ri; Kim Min-seok; Song Jae-rim
- Music by: Ok Young-jin
- Country of origin: South Korea
- Original language: Korean
- No. of episodes: 12

Production
- Executive producer: Yoon Hong-seung
- Running time: 30 minutes
- Production companies: SLL; Purple Cats Film; B.A. Entertainment

Original release
- Network: Viki
- Release: June 6 – July 12, 2024

My Military Valentine (Korean: 피타는 연애) is a 2024 South Korean television series starring Nam Gyu-ri, Kim Min-seok and Song Jae-rim. It was released on Viki from June 6, to July 12, 2024.

== Synopsis ==
The series tells the romance between a South Korean world star who has enlisted in the military due to some form of conspiracy, and a North Korean female soldier.

== Cast and characters ==
=== Main ===
- Nam Gyu-ri as Baek Young-ok: a second lieutenant who leads North Korea's eighth army in the special forces.
- Kim Min-seok as Lloyd: a South Korean world-class star who has female fans across the globe.
- Song Jae-rim as Sung Jae-hoon: a special forces soldier in the North Korean army.

=== Supporting ===
- Hong Seo-hee as Ji-ni Yoon
- Jeon Seung-hoon as Jang Cheol-gyu
- Choi Hye-jin as Seo Hee-ji
- Han Seung-bin as Seung-min
- Kim Na-yeon as Han Song-i
- Lee Jeong-hyun as Gye Nam-sik
- Kim Jung-young as Jeong Geum-suk
- Jung Jin-woo as Dong-pil
- Noh Sang-hyun as John Kim
- Park Hyun-sook as Won Tae-sook
- Lee Shin-ki
