= Taesong Fortress =

Former structure in Pyongyang, North Korea

- Hangul: 대성산성
- Hanja: 大城山城
- RR: Daeseongsanseong
- MR: Taesŏngsansŏng

Taesong Fortress

The Taesong Fortress (Korean: 대성산성) was a city fortress and the capital of Koguryo, until 668. It lies between the rivers Taedong and Pothong. Parts of the city walls, its gates (Taedong Gate, Pothong Gate) and pavilions (Ulmil Pavilion and Ryongwang Pavilion) still remain in the city of Pyongyang, North Korea. The fortress has been dated to the 3rd-5th centuries, during the Koguryo period.

The walls of the fortress have a circumference of 7,218m. (Another source gives the walls as being 7,076 metres round with total length of its walls being 9,284 metres) Built at the foot of Mount Taesong, the fortress provided protection for the capital, and held wells, storehouses and armories behind its walls. It remains one of the largest stone fortifications found in Korea in both its circumference and the area enclosed.

It is national treasure No. 8 of the DPRK.

== See also ==
- Anhak Palace
- Pyongyang Castle
