= A Head Coach's Turnover =

2025 South Korean television series

- Promotional poster
- Hangul: 맹감독의 악플러
- Lit.: Coach Maeng's Troll
- RR: Maenggamdogui akpeulleo
- MR: Maenggamdogŭi akp'ŭllŏ
- Genre: Sports comedy
- Written by: Kim Dam
- Directed by: Hyun Sol-ip
- Starring: Park Sung-woong; Park Soo-oh
- Country of origin: South Korea
- Original language: Korean

Production
- Executive producer: Jeon Yong-ju
- Producer: Jeong Gu-yeong
- Running time: 63–64 minutes
- Production company: iWill Media

Original release
- Network: MBC TV
- Release: May 23 – May 24, 2025

A Head Coach's Turnover (Korean: 맹감독의 악플러) is a 2025 South Korean sports comedy television series written by Kim Dam, directed by Hyun Sol-ip, and starring Park Sung-woong and Park Soo-oh. The series follows a struggling pro-basketball coach who teams up with his own online troll to improve the team. It premiered on MBC TV on May 23, and ended on May 24, 2025, at 22:00 (KST).

== Synopsis ==
Due to subpar team performance, Maeng Gong, a professional basketball coach, is in danger of being fired. Reluctantly, he joins forces with his devoted online troll, Go Hwa-jin, a senior in high school, in an attempt to save his team. They work together to overcome unforeseen obstacles on and off the court, resulting in a number of amusing and surprising scenarios. The two gain fresh insights on cooperation, competition, and personal development as their unlikely alliance grows.

== Cast and characters ==
=== Main ===
- Park Sung-woong as Maeng Gong

Head coach of the pro basketball team Big Pandas. Once a star player, he now struggles as his team underperforms and his job is at risk.

- Park Soo-oh as Go Hwa-jin

A high school senior and Gong's main online troll who has deep basketball knowledge and strong resentment toward him.

=== Supporting ===
==== Big Pandas players ====
- Kwon Ju-seok as Kang Woo-seung

Big Pandas' point guard who is known for his skill but often makes critical mistakes in games, earning the nickname "chicken heart".

- Kim Taek as Park Jun-hyeok

Big Pandas' forward who despite being a rookie, he is a key player, but tension arises over his role and playing time.

- Oh Hyun-joong as Kim Min-woo

Big Pandas' guard who doesn't get much court time, he is praised for his tenacity, defense, and commitment.

- Kang Hee-gu as Yoo Jin-gi

Big Pandas' forward who may not be a starter, but he boosts team morale and contributes strongly off the bench.

- Moon Su-in as Choi Jung-hyeop

Big Pandas' forward who is quiet and serious. He is facing personal and career challenges.

- Dale Anthony Samuels as Chess

A foreign player from Birmingham, England, who plays forward and started the season as the league's top scorer but struggles with declining performance and homesickness.

==== Big Pandas coaching staff ====
- Son Sang-gyu as Coach Bae

Gong's trusted assistant coach who helps to mediate conflicts within the team.

- Choi Byung-mo as Director Choi

Former teammate of Gong, now serves as the team's manager who offers support and political insight.

==== Hwa-jin's family ====
- Cha Bin as Go Woo-jin

Hwa-jin's older brother.

==== Staff of another team ====
- Lee Nam-hee as Director Lee

Executive director of the rival team who prioritize pleasing the parent company over the team's performance.

- Woo Ji-won as Coach Woo

A player-turned-coach who was popular as the best shooter during his active days and Gong's rival.

== Production and release ==
In February 2025, both Park Sung-woong and Park Sang-hoon (Note: Park Sang-hoon changed his name to Park Soo-oh after singing with KeyEast in April 2025.) were confirmed to star in the series. Scheduled to air in the first of 2025, it is written by Kim Dam and directed by Hyun Sol-ip. Notably, the script won the Grand Prize at the 2024 MBC Drama Script Contest where it was praised for its "strong character dynamics and dialogue". The drama is produced by iWill Media and was developed under the planning supervision of Kang Dae-seon. It aired on May 23 and 24, 2025, at 22:00 (KST) as part of MBC's two-episode Friday–Saturday drama lineup and also available for streaming on Wavve and TVING in South Korea, and Kocowa in selected territories.

== Ratings ==
Average TV viewership ratings (Nationwide)
Ep.	Original broadcast date	Average audience share (Nielsen Korea)
1	May 23, 2025	0.9% (51st)
2	May 24, 2025	1.6% (28th)
Average		1.3%
In the table above, the blue numbers represent the lowest ratings and the red numbers represent the highest ratings.
