= My Only Love Song =

2017 South Korean television series

- Official Poster
- Hangul: 마이 온리 러브송
- RR: Mai olli reobeusong
- MR: Mai olli rŏbŭsong
- Genre: Historical; Fantasy; Romance
- Written by: Kim Soo-jin
- Directed by: Min Doo-sik
- Starring: Lee Jong-hyun; Gong Seung-yeon
- Country of origin: South Korea
- Original language: Korean
- No. of episodes: 20

Production
- Producer: Ahn Suk-joon
- Production location: South Korea
- Production company: FNC Add Culture

Original release
- Network: Netflix
- Release: June 9, 2017

My Only Love Song (Korean: 마이 온리 러브송) is a 2017 South Korean television series produced by Netflix, starring Lee Jong-hyun and Gong Seung-yeon. It also has elements of fantasy since it involves time travel and a "magical van".

== Synopsis ==
Soo-jung (Gong Seung-yeon) is a conceited actress who believes that status and money can get you anywhere. She accidentally falls into a time-slip portal and travels to the past, specifically to 6th-century Goguryeo, one of the Three Kingdoms of Korea, while it is under the reign of King Pyeongwon. There she meets On-dal (Lee Jong-hyun), a man who loves money and will do anything to get it. However, he has a soft spot for the weak and helpless, and gives to them with a generous heart.

== Cast ==
- Lee Jong-hyun as On-dal
- Gong Seung-yeon as Song Soo-jung
- Lee Jae-jin as Byun Sam-yong
- Jin Ye-ju as Princess Pyunggang
- Ahn Bo-hyun as Moo-myung
- Park Joo-hyung as Ko Il-yong
- Lee Cheol-min as Movie Director / Magistrate
- Lee Yong-jik as King Pyungwon
- Kim Jung-pal as Government Official
- Kim Chae-eun as Mi-jin / Hwa-hong
- Kim Jung-young as Village chief
- Kim Bo-ra as Gwang-nyeo / New Manager / Princess Pyeongon (Ko Yi-yeon)
- Choi Jong-hoon as Bong Soo-hyuk (Cameo)

== Episodes ==
No.	Title	Original release date
1	"I Am Princess Pyeong-gang"	June 9, 2017
2	"I Know Who You Are"	June 9, 2017
3	"That's Me, On Dal"	June 9, 2017
4	"You Have Reached Your Destination"	June 9, 2017
5	"This Is Your Destiny"	June 9, 2017
6	"I Got You"	June 9, 2017
7	"Take My Hand"	June 9, 2017
8	"Now Traveling to Your Destination"	June 9, 2017
9	"Recalculating"	June 9, 2017
10	"Resetting Your Destination"	June 9, 2017
11	"Truth or Dare"	June 9, 2017
12	"Don't Disappear"	June 9, 2017
13	"Completely Bewitched"	June 9, 2017
14	"Where Is ... ?"	June 9, 2017
15	"On Dal, the General"	June 9, 2017
16	"Die by My Hand"	June 9, 2017
17	"Disappearing"	June 9, 2017
18	"I Will Obey Your Order"	June 9, 2017
19	"Arrived at Your Final Destination"	June 9, 2017
20	"My Only Love Song"	June 9, 2017

== Production ==
The drama serves as a reunion for Lee Jong-hyun and Gong Seung-yeon, who worked together in We Got Married.

== Original soundtrack ==
My Only Love Song OST Album

Soundtrack album by Various artists
- Released: June 9, 2017
- Genre: Soundtrack
- Language: Korean
- Labels: FNC Entertainment; LOEN Entertainment

No.	Title	Lyrics	Music	Artist	Length
1.	"Only One" (한 사람 그대죠)	Kim Jae-yang	Han Sung-hoon; Kim Chang-rak; Jeong Jin-wook	Lee Ki-chan	03:45
2.	"Another You"	Han Kyung-soo; Kim Chang-rak; Choi Han-sul	Han Kyung-soo; Kim Chang-rak; Choi Han-sul	Seo Yu-na (AOA)	03:34
3.	"Dear My Love" (고마운 내 사랑)	Han Sung-ho	Han Sung-hoon; Chun Gun-hwa; Lee Ji-hoon (Gyunwoo)	Jaeyoon (SF9)	04:33
Total length:					11:52
