= Anhakkung =

Former palace in Pyongyang, North Korea

Coordinates: 39.0618°N 125.8340°E

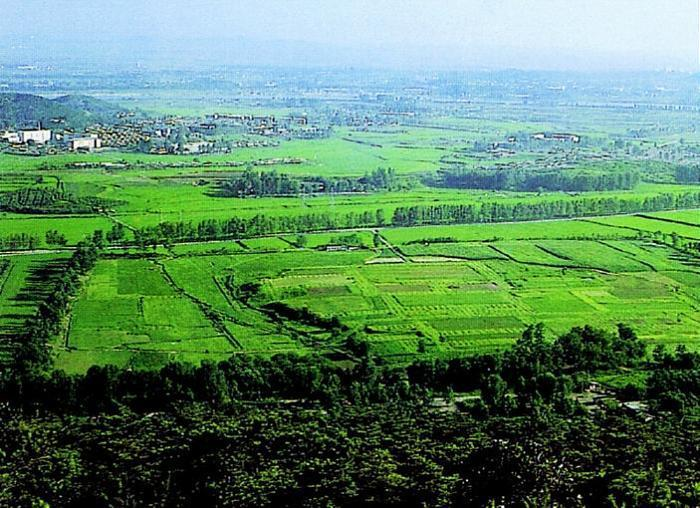
- The site of the temple (2019)

Korean name
- Hangul: 안학궁
- Hanja: 安鶴宮
- RR: Anhakgung
- MR: Anhakkung

Anhakkung (Korean: 안학궁; Hanja: 安鶴宮) was the royal residence of the kingdom Goguryeo after the capital was moved to Pyongyang from Gungnae. The palace was built in 427 AD in the Taesong District of Pyongyang, North Korea, at the foot of Mount Taesong (39°03'44.3"N 125°50'02.4"E).

The layout of the palace closely followed Korean architecture system using Korean fortress system. It was the palace where the king usually lived. The nobility and ordinary people lived outside this castle, and the outer fortress surrounding the urban area was present. There was a moat outside the east and west walls of the palace. The inside of the complex was composed of large separate palaces and corridors, as well as artificial gardens and lakes. 52 palace sites were identified. It was built after the transfer of the capital to Pyongyang, during which political groups familiar with Korean culture became a new bureaucratic group under the king's patronage.

The palace is surrounded by a wall, 2,488 metres (8,163 ft) in total circumference, one side being 622 metres (2,041 ft) long. The total area of the palace is 380,000 square metres (4,100,000 sq ft). Three streams flow down the mountain; one leading into a pond within the palace, the other two filling moats to the east and west of the complex. The palace featured landscaped gardens.

== See also ==
- Taesong Fortress
- Pyongyang Castle
