= Munjamyeong of Goguryeo =

21st King of Goguryeo (r. 491–519)

Munjamyeong 문자명
- Taewang
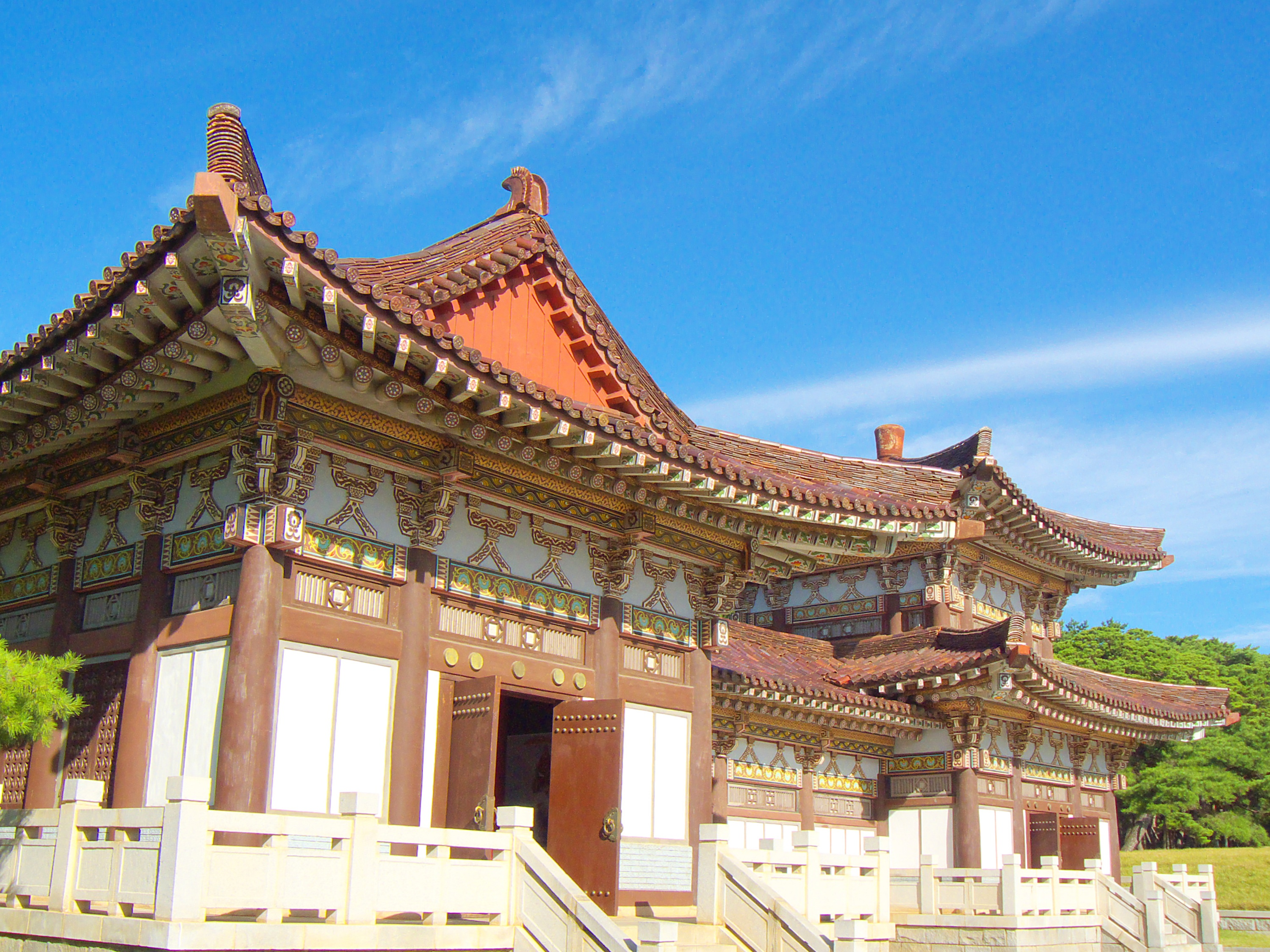
- Tomb of King Munjamyeong

King of Goguryeo
- Reign: January 492 – 519
- Coronation: January 492
- Predecessor: Jangsu
- Successor: Anjang
- Born: Go Naun; Unknown; Pyongyang Seong
- Died: 519; Pyongyang Seong
- Burial: Tomb of King Dongmyeong (possibly)
- Issue: Heungan; Boyeon
Regnal name
- Myeongchiho Taewang
Posthumous name
- Munjamyeong Taewang
- House: Go
- Dynasty: Goguryeo
- Father: Go Juda
- Religion: Buddhism
- Occupation: King

- Munjamyeong of Goguryeo
- Hangul: 나운
- Hanja: 羅雲
- RR: Naun
- MR: Naun

Monarch name
- Hangul: 문자명왕; 명치호왕
- Hanja: 文咨明王; 明治好王
- RR: Munjamyeongwang; Myeongchihowang
- MR: Munjamyŏngwang; Myŏngch'ihowang

Munja or Munjamyeong (died 519, r. 491–519) was the 21st monarch of Goguryeo, the northernmost of the Three Kingdoms of Korea. He was the grandson of Taewang Jangsu (413–491). Though Munja's father Gochudaega Joda (古鄒大加助多) had been named Crown Prince by Taewang Jangsu, Joda died before assuming the throne. He is considered as a ruler of Goguryeo at its zenith from Gwanggaeto the Great.

== Reign ==
In 427, Goguryeo had relocated its capital from the area around modern Ji'an along the upper Yalu River to Pyongyang (the modern capital of North Korea). This move came in the context of heightened rivalries with the other two of the Three Kingdoms, the then-allied Silla and Baekje.

Maintaining the success of long-distance diplomacy of Jangsu, Munja nurtured close relations with Chinese dynasties, notably Northern Wei, Southern Qi and Liang. Though North Wei went through several wars with its northern neighbour, Rourans and Song, it finally disrupted further attacks of Song, resulting the shift into Liang dynasty. Because of power shift, Goguryeo initiated diplomatic ties with Liang also: the Book of Qi says the title was bestowed upon the king of Goguryeo, which means bilateral relationship was fulfilled within the two. Simultaneously, Munja continued to stabilize the occupation of Liaodong peninsular based on friendly relationship with North Wei.

In terms of inter-Korean relationship, the 12th century Korean history the Samguk sagi relates that the remnants of the Buyeo kingdom submitted to Goguryeo in 494 after their defeat by the nomadic Mohe people. After occupying Dongbuyeo (Eastern Buyeo) in Gwanggaeto's reign, Goguryeo finally completed subjugating whole Buyeo (current Harbin) area. In the meantime, the alliance of Baekje and Silla strengthened its ties by serving each other in terms of battlefields with Goguryeo. Baekje with its continuous efforts under King Muryeong tried to attack its northern boundary with Goguryeo, notably in 505, mobilizing more than 3,000 soldiers. Korean records also mentions the provocative actions of Baekje several times, which called upon the counterattack of Munjamyeong in 506 but it failed without distinct fruits because of harsh famines.

Buddhism in Goguryeo gained its continuous momentum after its acceptance into the kingdom during the reign of Sosurim. As his grandfathers did, Munja also boosted the expansion and distribution of Buddhism, especially via Liang and Wei. Under his reign, it is said nine monks were firstly sent to Northern Wei with a view to investigating Buddhist books and others. In 7th year (498), he constructed the Buddhist temple Geumgangsa.

Munjamyeong was succeeded by his eldest son Anjang of Goguryeo.

== Family ==
- Father: Prince Joda/Juda (조다; 助多)
  - Grandfather: King Jangsu (장수왕; 長壽王)
- Unknown wife
  - Son: Prince Heungan (흥안, 興安; d. 531)
  - Son: Prince Boyeon (보연, 寶延; d. 545)

== See also ==
- History of Korea
- Three Kingdoms of Korea
- List of Korean monarchs

Munjamyeong of Goguryeo House of Go Died: 519
Regnal titles
Preceded by Jangsu	Monarch of Goguryeo; 491–519	Succeeded by Anjang
