= On Dal =

- Prince Consort of Goguryeo
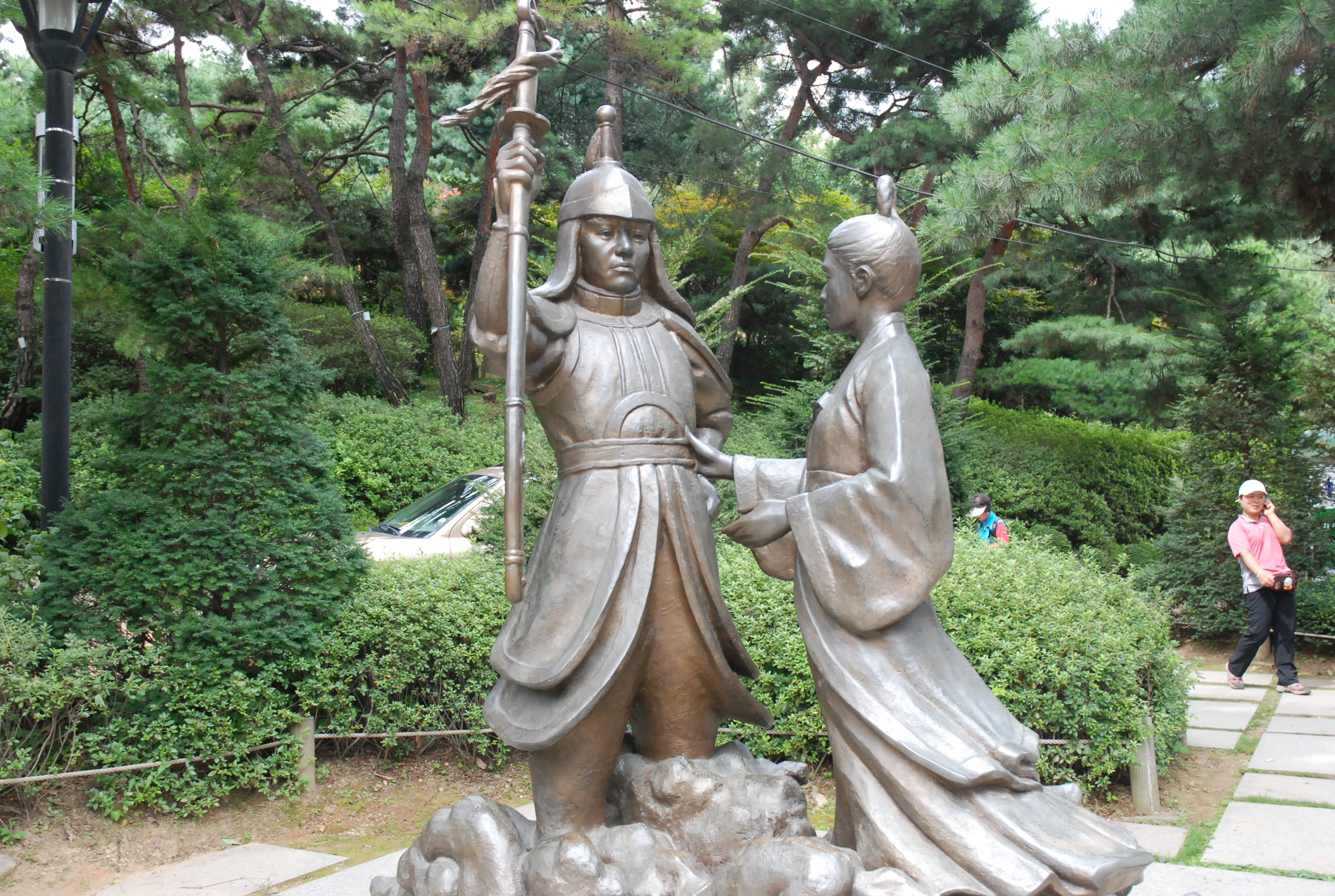
- Statue of On Dal and Princess Pyeonggang at the Achasanseong fortress entrance
- Died: c. 590; Kingdom of Goguryeo
- Wife: Princess Pyeonggang
- House: Geumgu On

Korean name
- Hangul: 온달
- Hanja: 溫達
- Revised Romanization: Ondal
- McCune–Reischauer: Ont'al

On Dal (died 590), commonly referred to by Koreans as "On Dal the Fool" (babo ondal (바보 온달)), was a Goguryeo General and the husband of Princess Pyeonggang.

A legend tells that he was unusually tall, his face was handsome, and he had a good heart. His family was poor, so he begged for his mother. Though of middle-class origin, he later married Princess Pyeonggang, a daughter of King Pyeongwon of Goguryeo, and then become a general. He died bravely leading the Goguryeo garrison in 590 at Achasanseong Fortress during a battle against the Silla army.

== In popular culture ==
- Portrayed by Ji Hyun-woo in the 2009 KBS2 TV series Invincible Lee Pyung Kang.
- Portrayed by Lee Jong-hyun in the 2017 Netflix TV series My Only Love Song.
- Portrayed by Na In-woo in the 2021 KBS2 series River Where the Moon Rises.

== See also ==
- Princess Pyeonggang
- Pyeongwon of Goguryeo
