= Our Diary =

- Theatrical poster
- Hangul: 우리들의 일기
- RR: Urideurui ilgi
- MR: Uridŭrŭi ilgi
- Directed by: Lim Gong-sam
- Produced by: Kim Ho-yeon
- Starring: Yoon Sung-mo; Shin Ji-hoon
- Production company: ADM Entertainment
- Distributed by: Dreamfact Entertainment
- Release date: June 1, 2017 (South Korea)
- Running time: 94 minutes
- Country: South Korea
- Language: Korean

Our Diary (Korean: 우리들의 일기) is a 2017 South Korean action drama film directed by Lim Gong-sam.

== Cast ==
- Yoon Sung-mo as Soo-ho
  - Park Sang-hoon as young Soo-ho
- Shin Ji-hoon as Hyeon-soo
- Jung Han-bi as Kyeong-ah
- Cho Min-ho as Jin-yeong
- Lee Hyung-won as Pil-ho
- Kong Jung-hwan as Seoul thug 1
- Jang-won as Seoul thug 2
- Song Eun-yool as So-yeon
- Moon Chae-hong as Yoo-mi
- Yang Taek-ho as Hurricane member 1
