= Jin Ye-ju =

South Korean actress (born 1996)

- Born: Kim Yeon-seo; August 6, 1996 (age 30); South Korea
- Occupation: Actress
- Agent: FNC Entertainment

Korean name
- Hangul: 김연서
- RR: Gim Yeonseo
- MR: Kim Yŏnsŏ

Stage name
- Hangul: 진예주
- RR: Jin Yeju
- MR: Chin Yeju

Jin Ye-ju (Korean: 진예주; born 6 August 1996), birth name Kim Yeon-seo (김연서), is a South Korean actress.

== Filmography ==
=== Television series ===
Year	Title	Role	Notes	Ref.
2018	Evergreen	Han Hyo-jin	Supporting Role	

=== Web series ===
Year	Title	Role	Network	Notes	Ref.
2017	My Only Love Song	Princess Pyunggang	Netflix	Main Role	
2019	In Seoul	Lee Ha-rim	V LIVE, Naver TV, YouTube, JTBC	Main Role	
2019	Kiss Scene in Yeonnamdong	Cha Do-hyun	YouTube	Supporting Role	
2019	4 Reasons Why I Hate Christmas	Lee Ha-rim	V LIVE, Naver TV, YouTube	Main Role	
2020	Jump! Jump! Jump!	Yu-ri	Naver TV, YouTube	Main Role	
2020	In Seoul 2	Lee Ha-rim	V LIVE, Naver TV, YouTube, JTBC	Main Role	
2021	Ply Friends 2	Lee Ha-rim	V LIVE, Naver TV, YouTube	one-act drama	

=== Film ===
Year	Title	Role	Ref.
2017	New Trial	Soo-jung	

=== Music video appearances ===
Year	Song title	Artist	Notes	Ref.
2019	"Spring Memories"	N.Flying	with Kwak Dong-yeon	
2020	"Are You Fine"	Kassy	with Lee Ki-taek	
