= Anwon of Goguryeo =

23rd King of Goguryeo Korea (531–545)

Anwon 안원
- Taewang
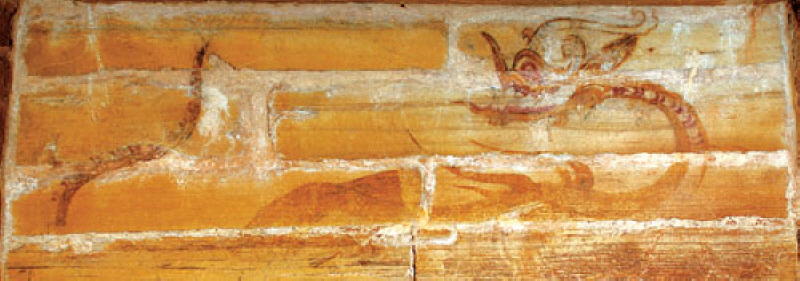
- This petroglyph is from King Anwon's tomb

King of Goguryeo
- Reign: May 531 – March 545 A.D.
- Coronation: May 531 A.D.
- Predecessor: Anjang
- Successor: Yangwon
- Born: Go Boyeon; January 498 A.D. Pyongyang Castle
- Died: March 545 A.D. Pyongyang Castle
- Burial: Honamri Sasinchong
- Spouse: 3 spouses
- Issue: Pyeongsung
Regnal name
- Yeonga Taewang; Geonheung Taewang
Posthumous name
- Anwon Taewang; Gokyanggangsang Taewang; Hyanggangsang Taewang
- House: Go
- Dynasty: Goguryeo
- Father: Munjamyeong
- Religion: Buddhism
- Occupation: King

- Anwon of Goguryeo
- Hangul: 보연
- Hanja: 寶延
- RR: Boyeon
- MR: Poyŏn

Monarch name
- Hangul: 안원왕; (곡)향강상왕
- Hanja: 安原王; (鵠)香岡上王
- RR: Anwonwang; (Gok)Hyanggangsangwang
- MR: Anwŏnwang; (Kok)Hyanggangsangwang

Anwon (died 545) (r. 531–545) was the 23rd ruler of Goguryeo, the northernmost of the Three Kingdoms of Korea. He was the younger brother of Anjang of Goguryeo, and is said to have been tall and wise. He was the last Korean monarch to be called Taewang with confirmed era name in archaeological records, the title of Goguryeo emperor with own imperial era.

== Battles ==
The other two of the Three Kingdoms, Baekje and Silla, formed an alliance in response to the Goguryeo threat, leading to a relatively balanced peace. In the only conflict during Anwon's reign, in the ninth lunar month of 540, Baekje laid siege to Usan Castle, but Anwon sent 5,000 cavalry and drove the attackers off.

== Disasters ==
Goguryeo suffered many natural disasters during Anwon's reign, such as flooding in the south of his kingdom, earthquakes, thunderstorms and a severe epidemic, a severe drought (in his 6th year of reign. He had help the people because of the incident), a plague of locusts. However, he attempted to salvage starving people from hunger during the 7th year of his reign during the spring.

== Chaos around succession and death ==
Anwon's first queen had not given birth to a son. In his third year on the throne, he had designated as crown prince his eldest son by his second queen, prince Pyeongseong (subsequent king Yangwon). However, in the last year of Anwon's reign, there was a power struggle between his second and third queens who each sought to make her son the crown prince.

The aristocracy split into two camps, leading to violent battles during which the king was apparently killed. This internal division was the beginning of a significantly weakening of the royal throne and Goguryeo itself in subsequent years.

The king died in the third lunar month of 545, after 15 years on the throne. He was given the posthumous royal title of King Anwŏn.

== Foreign relations ==
The king paid tribute to Northern Wei Liang dynasty and Eastern Wei.

== Family ==
- Father: King Munja (문자명왕; 文咨明王)
  - Grandfather: Prince Joda/Juda (조다; 助多)
- Consorts and their respective issue(s):
1. Center Lady (정부인; 正夫人) – No issue.
2. Middle Lady (중부인; 中夫人)
  1. Prince Pyeongseong (평성; 平成)
3. Little Lady (소부인; 小夫人)
  1. Unknown son

== See also ==
- History of Korea
- Three Kingdoms of Korea
- List of Korean monarchs

Anwon of Goguryeo House of Go Died: 545
Regnal titles
Preceded by Anjang	Monarch of Goguryeo; 531–545	Succeeded by Yangwon
