= Yangwon of Goguryeo =

24th King of Goguryeo (r. 545–559)

Yangwon 양원
- Taewang

King of Goguryeo
- Reign: March 545 – March 559 A.D.
- Coronation: March 545 A.D.
- Predecessor: Anwon
- Successor: Pyeongwon

Crown Prince Goguryeo
- Reign: January 533 – March 545 A.D.
- Coronation: January 533 A.D.
- Predecessor: Heungan
- Successor: Yangseong
- Born: Go Pyeongseong/Seong; 538 A.D. Pyongyang Seong
- Died: March 559 A.D. Pyongyang Seong
- Burial: Jinpari Number (1)
- Issue: Yangseong
Regnal name
- Yanggang Sangho Taewang; Yanggang Taewang
Posthumous name
- Yangwon Taewang
- House: Go
- Dynasty: Goguryeo
- Father: Anwon
- Religion: Buddhism
- Occupation: King

- Yangwon of Goguryeo
- Hangul: 평성
- Hanja: 平成
- RR: Pyeongseong
- MR: P'yŏngsŏng

Monarch name
- Hangul: 양원왕; 양강(상호)왕
- Hanja: 陽原王; 陽崗(上好)王
- RR: Yangwonwang; Yanggang(sangho)wang
- MR: Yangwŏnwang; Yanggang(sangho)wang

Yangwon (538~559) (r. 545–559) was the 24th ruler of Goguryeo, the northernmost of the Three Kingdoms of Korea. He was the eldest son of Anwon of Goguryeo. During Yangwon's reign, Goguryeo gradually grew weaker and was obliged to take various urgent measures to block foreign invasions, eventually losing the Seoul region to the alliance of the other two Korean kingdoms.

== Family ==
- Father: King Anwon (안원왕; 安原王)
  - Grandfather: King Munja (문자명왕; 文咨明王)
- Mother: Middle Lady (중부인; 中夫人)
- Unknown wife
  - Son: Prince Yangseong (양성; 陽成)

== Life and reign ==
He was confirmed as heir to the throne in 533, the third year of Anwon's reign. Although he was the heir, it is said that he was not able to simply assume power after his father's death. Anwon had three wives, and because the first did not bear him a son, the other queens strove to put their son on the throne. Yangwon's supporters won the military struggle and he was able to succeed to the throne.

Preparing for war in 547, Yangwon rebuilt Baegam fortress and repaired Sin fortress. In 548, he sent 6,000 soldiers against Baekje's Doksan Fortress but the Silla general Ju Jin led a relief army and the Goguryeo assault failed. In 550, Baekje invaded and sacked Dosal fortress. Goguryeo counterattacked and struck Baekje's Geumhyeon fortress, but Silla took advantage of this to seize two more Goguryeo castles.

In 551, the emerging empire of the Göktürks invaded from Central Asia and laid siege to Sin fortress; unable to take it, they attacked Baegam fortress instead. At this, Yangwon sent his general Go Heul and 10,000 troops against the Göktürks; they killed or captured 1,000. In the same year, Silla invaded once again and captured ten districts of the present-day Seoul region. In 552, Jangan fortress was built. In 554, Yangwon's forces attacked Ungcheon fortress in Baekje, but failed to take it.

In 553, Northern Qi's Emperor Wenxuan sent ambassador Cui Liu to Goguryeo to request the return of Chinese civilians who had fled the turmoil during the end of Northern Wei. When Yongwon's court refused, Cui Liu became furious and punched Yangwon off his chair. Frightened, Yangwon apologised for refusing and agreed to return five thousand households.

In 557, Yangwon designated the prince Go Yang-seong as heir to the throne. In the tenth lunar month of that same year, the commander Gan Juri of Hwando fortress rebelled, but the rebellion was put down and he was executed. Yangwon died in 559, after fifteen years on the throne.

== See also ==
- History of Korea
- List of Korean monarchs

Yangwon of Goguryeo House of Go Died: 559
Regnal titles
Preceded by Anwon	Monarch of Goguryeo; 545–559	Succeeded by Pyeongwon
