= My Dangerous Wife =

2020 South Korean television series

- Release poster
- Hangul: 나의 위험한 아내
- RR: Naui wiheomhan anae
- MR: Naŭi wihŏmhan anae
- Genre: Drama; Thriller; Mystery
- Based on: Boku no Yabai Tsuma by Tsutomu Kuroiwa
- Developed by: MBN Production plan
- Written by: Hwang Da-eun
- Directed by: Lee Hyeong-min
- Starring: Kim Jung-eun; Choi Won-young
- Composer: Chung Ye-kyung
- Country of origin: South Korea
- Original language: Korean
- No. of episodes: 16

Production
- Executive producer: Kim Jae-hoon (MBN)
- Producers: Hwang Hyuk; Park Seong-hye
- Camera setup: Single-camera
- Running time: 60 minutes
- Production company: KeyEast
- Budget: 11 billon

Original release
- Network: MBN
- Release: October 5 – November 24, 2020

My Dangerous Wife (Korean: 나의 위험한 아내; RR: Naui wiheomhan anae) is a 2020 South Korean television series starring Kim Jung-eun, and Choi Won-young. It was premiered on MBN on October 5, 2020. It is the Korean adaptation of the 2016 Japanese television series Boku no Yabai Tsuma.

== Synopsis ==
A story about a couple who starts a war at home with extremely dangerous choices, and about finding the meaning of life as a husband and wife in Korean society.

Kim Yoon Cheol (Choi Won Young) is a famous chef and runs a popular Italian restaurant. He is happily married to Shim Jae Kyung (Kim Jung Eun) – or so he thinks until he meets the beautiful Jin Sun Mi (Choi Yu Hwa), a staff member at his restaurant.

Despite his six-year marriage to Shim Jae Kyung, he falls head-over-heels for Jin Sun Mi – and begins a steamy affair.

The two start to hatch a plot to kill Shim Jae Kyung – but when Kim Yoon Cheol arrives home one day, he finds that his wife is nowhere to be found and there are bloodstains everywhere.

He eventually learns that she has been kidnapped – and, returning to his senses, realizes how much he loves her. He resolves to find his wife, no matter what the cost.

But as he begins his quest, he starts to realize that his wife may have hidden depths even he could not have ever fathomed…

== Cast ==
=== Main ===
- Kim Jung-eun as Shim Jae-kyung, (37 years old) wife of Yoon-chul, an ordinary housewife and an influencer.
- Choi Won-young as Kim Yoon-chul, (39 years old) Jae-kyung's husband, CEO of Cafe Old Crop.

=== Supporting ===
- Choi Yu-hwa as Jin Sun-mi (33 years old) Yoon-chul's restaurant team leader
- Ahn Nae-sang as Noh Chang-beom, (48 years old), pawnshop owner, private detective, Yoon-chul's ex-brother-in-law
- Shim Hye-jin as Ha Eun-hye, (52 years old) as a neighboring wife, CEO of a small and medium-sized business related to life beauty in the past Yun chul and Jae-kyung couple's neighbors.
- Lee Jun-hyeok as Seo Ji-tae, (40 years old) Inspector homicide detective. He is a father of twins
- Ahn Seo-ha as San-i (9 yo) – Ji-tae and Hee-jeong's twin
- Yun Jong-seok as Jo Min-kyu, (37 years old), younger neighbor's husband, a past home shopping model.
- Yoon Ye-hee as Kim Yoon-hee, (43 years old), Yoon chul's older sister, Jeong soon's eldest daughter and Chang-beom's ex-wife.
- Baek Soo-jang as Song Yu-min, (34 years old), painter, financial junior in art college. A pure man who has a consistent heart for Jae-kyung, a senior in college, and a romanticist
- Kim Ja-young as Mother Jeong-soon, (69 years old)
- Lee Hyo-bi as Chae-rim

== Ratings ==
My Dangerous Wife : South Korea viewers per episode (thousands)

Season	Episode number																Average
Season	1	2	3	4	5	6	7	8	9	10	11	12	13	14	15	16	Average
1	N/A	N/A	543	588	530	449	N/A	N/A	566	N/A	659	698	N/A	496	551	639	N/A

Source: Audience measurement performed nationwide by Nielsen Korea.

Average TV viewership ratings
Ep.	Original broadcast date	Average audience share (Nielsen Korea)	
Ep.	Original broadcast date	Nationwide	Seoul
1	October 5, 2020	2.578%	2.769%
2	October 6, 2020	2.409%	—N/a
3	October 12, 2020	2.835%	2.975%
4	October 13, 2020	3.053%	—N/a
5	October 19, 2020	2.783%	2.836%
6	October 20, 2020	2.440%	2.749%
7	October 26, 2020	2.208%	—N/a
8	October 27, 2020	1.744%	—N/a
9	November 2, 2020	2.700%	2.612%
10	November 3, 2020	2.278%	—N/a
11	November 9, 2020	3.357%	3.465%
12	November 10, 2020	3.403%	3.447%
13	November 16, 2020	2.318%	—N/a
14	November 17, 2020	2.447%	2.338%
15	November 23, 2020	3.040%	3.312%
16	November 24, 2020	3.380%	3.601%
Average		2.686%	— (Note: Due to some ratings not recorded, the exact average rating is unknown.)
In the table above, the blue numbers represent the lowest ratings and the red numbers represent the highest ratings.; N/A denotes that the rating is not known.; This drama airs on a cable channel/pay TV which normally has a relatively smaller audience compared to free-to-air TV/public broadcasters (KBS, SBS, MBC and EBS).

== Premakes ==
- The Japanese series Boku no Yabai Tsuma (transl. "My Bad Wife"), which was aired in 2016 and starred Hideaki Ito and Yoshino Kimura, is the original series that inspired 2020's My Dangerous Wife.
- Tehlikeli Karım (transl. "My Dangerous Wife"), starring Seçkin Özdemir and Gonca Vuslateri, is a Turkish remake of the Japanese series that aired on Show TV beginning March 25, 2018. Despite ending with low ratings in its 6th episode, the finale was well-planned and provided satisfying closure.
