= Kim Jung-young =

South Korean television and film actress (born 1972)

- Born: July 27, 1972 (age 54); South Korea
- Other name: Kim Jeong-young
- Occupations: Actress; theater actor; musical actor
- Years active: 2000–present
- Agent: SWMP
- Spouse: Kim Hak-sun

Korean name
- Hangul: 김정영
- RR: Gim Jeongyeong
- MR: Kim Chŏngyŏng

Kim Jung-young (Korean: 김정영; born on 27 July 1972) is a South Korean actress. She made her acting debut in 2000 in films, since then, she has appeared in number of plays, films and television series. She got recognition for her supporting roles in Clean with Passion for Now (2018), Black Dog: Being A Teacher (2019), Jirisan, River Where the Moon Rises (2021) and Business Proposal (2022). She has acted in films such as: The Piper (2015), The King's Case Note (2017) and Our Body (2018) among others.

== Career ==
At Sangmyung University Kim was a member of a playgroup and later she joined theater company Han River in 1995. She debuted in films in 2000 through Kim Ki-duk's Real Fiction. After her first appearance, she did minor roles in the films such as Bungee Jumping of Their Own (2001) and an indie film Waikiki Brothers (2001). Then she got break in Bad Guy (2001) and 2003 NETPAC award winner of the Locarno International Film Festival, Spring, Summer, Fall, Winter... and Spring. Later she appeared in films such as Thread of Lies (2013), The Piper (2015), Lost to Shame (2016), Memoir of a Murderer (2017) and indie film Our Body (2018). Her television debut was in 2012 with a small role in How Long I've Kissed and then Secret Affair (2014).

In 2022, Kim appeared in romantic comedy Business Proposal, tvN's revenge melodrama Eve, and Coupang's psychological thriller Anna. She is also cast in JTBC's Bloody Romance, which will air in second half of 2022. In the same year, her film Gyeong-ah's Daughter, which was screened at 23rd Jeonju International Film Festival won CGV Arthouse Award Distribution Support Prize and Watcha's Pick: Feature award at the festival.

== Filmography ==
Key
†	Denotes films that have not yet been released

=== Films ===
Year	Title	Role	Notes	Ref.
2000	Real Fiction	Female model		
2001	Bungee Jumping of Their Own	English teacher		
2001	Waikiki Brothers	Hyeon-goo's wife		
2001	Bad Guy	Eun-hye		
2003	Madeleine			
2003	Spring, Summer, Fall, Winter... and Spring			
2004	Lovely Rivals			
2005	Mapado			
2005	Voice	Young-Eon's mother		
2005	You Are My Sunshine	Blind date girl		
2009	A Little Pond	Mr. Park's wife		
2011	Mama	Yeon-ah's mother		
2013	Thread of Lies	Hwa-yeon's mother		
2015	The Piper	Cheol-soo's mother		
2016	Queen of Walking	Mom	Guest role	
2016	Vanishing Time: A Boy Who Returned	Jae-wook's mother		
2016	Merry Christmas Mr. Mo	Yeon-jeong		
2016	Lost to Shame	Jeong Ok-soon		
2017	A Single Rider			
2017	The King's Case Note	Manufacturing court lady		
2017	Memoir of a Murderer	Gambling woman		
2018	Our Body	Ja-yeong's mother		
2019	Kim Ji-young: Born 1982 (film)	Doctor		
2019	An Old Lady	Restaurant owner		
2019	Oh! My Gran	Young Moon-hee		
2020	The Day I Died: Unclosed Case	Superior		
2021	Finding Angel	Yakult		
2021	F20	Lee Kyeong-hwa		
2022	Gyeong-ah's Daughter	Gyeong-ah		

=== Television series ===
Year	Title	Role	Notes	Ref.
2012	How Long I've Kissed			
2014	Secret Affair	Editor-in-chief		
2015	Heard It Through the Grapevine	Jung-soon		
2016	Signal	Won-kyung's aunt	Special appearance epi. 2-4	
2016	Mrs. Cop 2	Jeon Bo-yeong		
2016	The Vampire Detective	Hwang Jae-gook		
2016	My Lawyer, Mr. Jo	Kang Ja-yeong		
2016	Becky's Back	Hong Doo-sik's older sister		
2016	The Good Wife	Jeong Jae-yeol's mother		
2016	Dr. Romantic	Dong-joo's mom		
2017	Solomon's Perjury	Joo-ri's mother		
2017	Innocent Defendant	Han Sang-wook		
2017	My Father Is Strange	Lee Yoon-seok's mother	Special appearance	
2017	The Guardians	Soo Ji-mo		
2017	Queen for Seven Days	Lady Kwon		
2017	Hello, My Twenties!	Song Ji-won's mother		
2017	Black	Choi Soon-jung		
2018	Return	Kim Dong-bae's mother		
2018	Tempted			
2018	Let Me Introduce Her	Lee Sook-hyun		
2018	The Smile Has Left Your Eyes	Baek Seung-ah's mother		
2018	Clean with Passion for Now	Geum-ja - Seon-gyeol's long-term babysitter		
2019	One Spring Night	Go Sook-hee		
2019	Arthdal Chronicles	Soo Ha-na		
2019	Catch the Ghost	Choi Kyeong-hee		
2019	Black Dog: Being A Teacher	Moon So-nyeo		
2020	The Game: Towards Zero	Seo Joon-yeong's mother		
2020	The King: Eternal Monarch	Seo-ryeong's mother		
2020	Born Again	Heo Jin-kyeong		
2020	Sweet Munchies	Jin-woo and Jin-sung's mother		
2020	Chip In	Ji Sul-young		
2020	Do You Like Brahms?	Park Joon-young's mother		
2021	River Where the Moon Rises	Lady Gongson		
2021	Drama Stage: "Mint Condition"	Sim Eun-hyo	Season 4, Epi. 1	
2021	Sell Your Haunted House	Kim So-min		
2021	Racket Boys	Seon-yeong		
2021	KBS Drama Special: "F20"	Lee Kyeong-hwa	Season 12, Epi. 2	
2021	Jirisan	Heo Jin-ok		
2022	Business Proposal	Mother		
2022	Eve	Kim Jin-sook		
2022	Anna	Hong-joo		
2022	Bad Prosecutor	Jang Jae-hee		
2023	My Perfect Stranger	Ok-ja		
2023	Delightfully Deceitful	Park Ja-young		
2024	My Military Valentine	Jeong Geum-suk		
2025	Our Golden Days	Jeong Soon-hee	KBS2 weekend drama	
2026	See You at Work Tomorrow!	Han Woo-jin		
2026	Doctor X: Mafia in White	Yu Mi-gyeong		

=== Web series ===
Year	Title	Role	Notes	Ref.
2017	My Only Love Song	Village chief		
2022–2023	The Glory	Park Sang-im	Part 1–2	

== Theater ==
Year	Title	Role	Ref.
2008	Late Learning Piano	Old studio 76	
2009	Ring Ring Ring Ring	woman	
