= Park Soo-oh =

South Korean actor (born 2005)

- Born: Park Sang-hoon; May 2, 2005 (age 21)
- Occupation: Actor
- Years active: 2014–present
- Agent: KeyEast

Korean name
- Hangul: 박상훈
- RR: Bak Sanghun
- MR: Pak Sanghun

Stage name
- Hangul: 박수오
- RR: Bak Suo
- MR: Pak Suo

Park Soo-oh (Korean: 박수오; born Park Sang-hoon (박상훈) on May 2, 2005) is a South Korean actor. He made his acting debut in 2014, since then, he appeared in number of historical television series as child and young actor. He is known for his roles in Warriors of the Dawn (2017), River Where the Moon Rises (2021), Lovers of the Red Sky (2021) and Show Window: The Queen's House (2021–2022).

== Career ==
Park Sang-hoon made his debut in the film Cat in 2014 and later appeared as child actor in various historical dramas. In 2021 he played childhood counterparts of Grand Prince Juhyang in SBS historical-fantasy drama Lovers of the Red Sky, Prince Go-won in KBS historical TV series River Where the Moon Rises, Jeong Jin-soo in Netflix dark fantasy Hellbound and Baek Soo-hyeon in tvN mystery thriller drama The Road: The Tragedy of One. He also played a supporting role in Channel A's mystery drama Show Window: The Queen's House.

Park was nominated for Best Young Actor award at 2021 KBS Drama Awards for his portrayal of young prince Go-won in River Where the Moon Rises.

In April 2025, Park changed his name to Park Soo-oh and signed with KeyEast.

== Filmography ==
=== Films ===
Key
†	Denotes films that have not yet been released

Film appearances
Year	Title	Role	Notes	Ref.
2014	Cat	Child 3	Debut	
2014	The 4th Innovator	Young Yang-i		
2017	Our Diary	Young Soo-ho		
2017	House of the Disappeared	Hyo-je		
2017	Warriors of the Dawn	Prince Shinseong		
2017	Roman Holiday	Young In-han		
2018	Keys to the Heart	Young Jo-ha		
2018	Taklamakan	Joon-ho		
2022	The Policeman's Lineage	Choi Min-jae (young)		
2022	Child for Children	Jae-min		

=== Television series ===
Key
†	Denotes television productions that have not yet been released

Television appearances
Year	Title	Role	Notes	Ref.
2015	The Superman Age	Child		
2015	The Producers	Baek Seung-chan (young)		
2016	My Mind's Flower Rain	Lee Kang-wook (young)		
2016	Secret Healer	Hae-ran's young brother		
2016	The Sound of Your Heart	Jo Joon (young)		
2016–2017	Blow Breeze	Jo Hee-dong (young)		
2016–2017	Hello, My Twenties!	Yoo Eun-jae's older brother		
2017	Saimdang, Memoir of Colors	Won-hyo		
2017–2018	A Korean Odyssey	Eun-seong	Special appearance	
2018	Untouchable	Jang Gi-seo (young)		
2019	Nokdu Flower	Baek Yi-kang (young)		
2019	Flower Crew: Joseon Marriage Agency	Kang (young)		
2020	Soul Mechanic	Park Luo		
2020	Born Again	Cheon Jong-woo		
2020	Kingmaker: The Change of Destiny	Lee Jae-hwang, Emperor Gojong, Lee Ha-eung's second son		
2020	Do You Like Brahms?	Park Joon-young (young)		
2020	Delayed Justice	Park Tae-yong (young)		
2021	The Road: The Tragedy of One	Baek Soo-hyun (young)		
2021	River Where the Moon Rises	Prince Go-won (young)		
2021	Lovers of the Red Sky	Grand Prince Juhyang (young)		
2021	Hellbound	Jeong Jin-soo (young)		
2021–2022	Show Window: The Queen's House	Shin Tae-yong		
2022	Tomorrow	Park Joong-gil (young)		
2022	Alchemy of Souls	Jang Wook (young)	Part 1	
2022	Remarriage & Desires	Lee Jun-ho		
2022	The Law Cafe	Hong Ji-hoon	Cameo (episode 6–7)	
2023	Brain Works	Ho-young	Cameo (episode 9–10)	
2023	Queenmaker	Kang Hyun-woo		
2025	A Head Coach's Turnover	Go Hwa-jin		
2025	First Love	Ha Sun-woo		
2025	Oh My Ghost Clients	Lee Min-wook		
2026	If Wishes Could Kill	Han Gi-tae	Special appearance	

=== Web series ===
Web appearances
Year	Title	Role	Notes	Ref.
2021	The Birth of a Nation	Guk Ho-yeon		

== Ambassadorship ==
- Ambassador for Water Team & Team (2022)

== Awards and nominations ==
Name of the award ceremony, year presented, category, nominee of the award, and the result of the nomination
Award ceremony	Year	Category	Nominee / Work	Result	Ref.
KBS Drama Awards	2021	Best Young Actor	River Where the Moon Rises	Nominated	
KBS Drama Awards	2022	Best Young Actor	The Law Cafe	Nominated	
