= Kangso Three Tombs =

Koguryo-era tombs in North Korea

Coordinates: 38°57′53″N 125°25′30″E

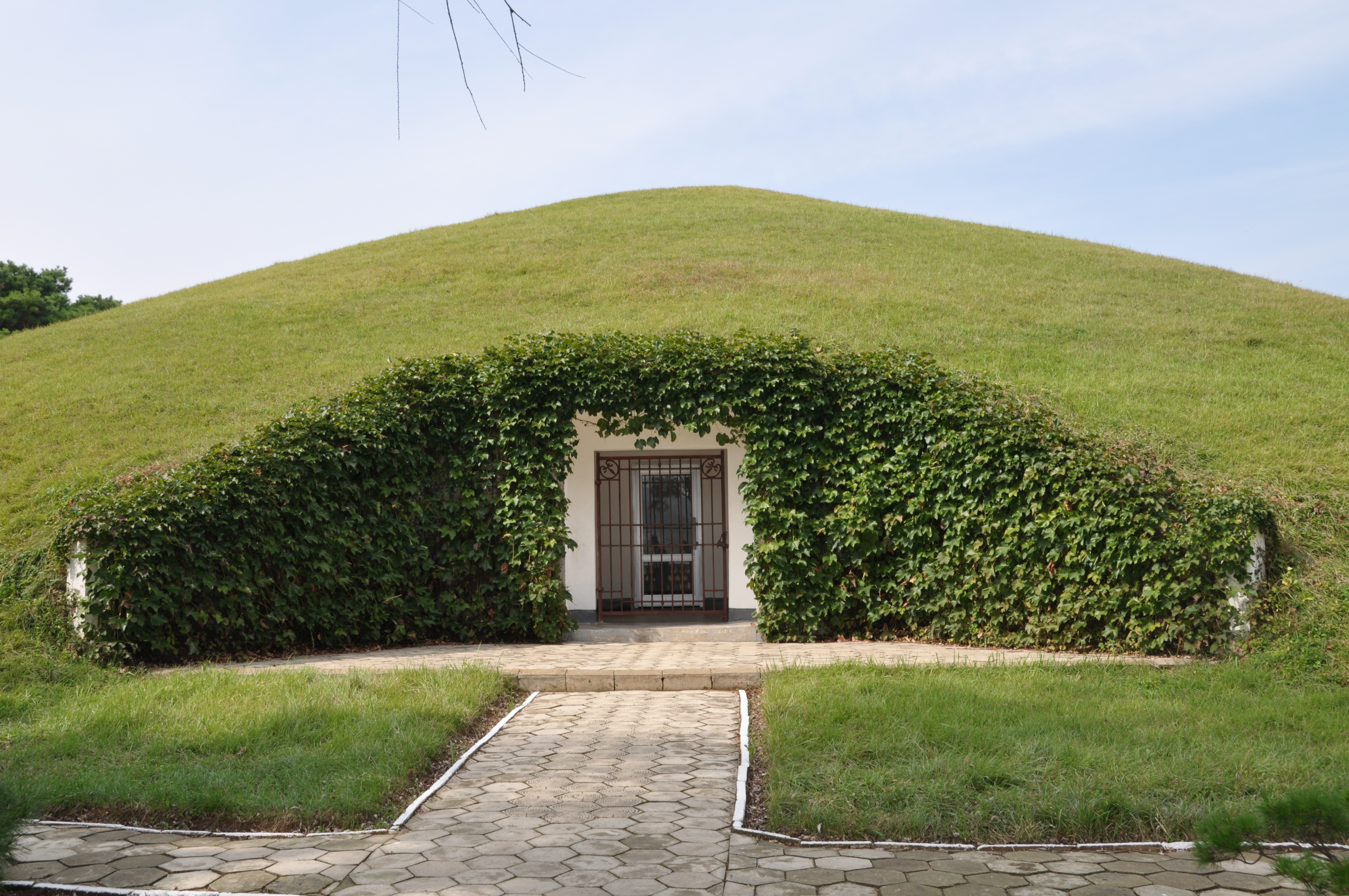
- One of the tombs

Korean name
- Chosŏn'gŭl: 강서세무덤
- Hancha: 江西세무덤
- Revised Romanization: Gangseo-semudeom
- McCune–Reischauer: Kangsŏ-semudŏm

The Kangso Three Tombs (Korean: 강서세무덤) are mausoleums located in Kangso-guyok, North Korea. They are part of the Complex of Koguryo Tombs, a UNESCO World Heritage site, a National Treasure of North Korea #28. The large tomb is 50 metres long and 8.7 metres high, the middle tomb is 45 metres long and 7.8 metres high and the small one is 40 metres long and 6.75 metres high. Frescoes inside the tombs depict four tutelary deities. The large tomb holds depictions of a blue dragon and a black serpent-tortoise, while a white tiger and a red phoenix are depicted in the middle tomb. The frescoes are particularly colourful and show Koguryo aristocratic life in detail, including dancing, wrestling and hunting. The Kangso Three Tombs were unearthed in 1911 by Japanese archaeologist Imanishi Ryū and were extensively studied.
