= Pyongyang Castle =

Historic building in North Korea

Coordinates: 39.0235°N 125.7570°E

- Hangul: 평양성
- Hanja: 平壤城
- RR: Pyeongyangseong
- MR: P'yŏngyangsŏng

Alternate name
- Hangul: 장안성
- Hanja: 長安城
- RR: Janganseong
- MR: Changansŏng

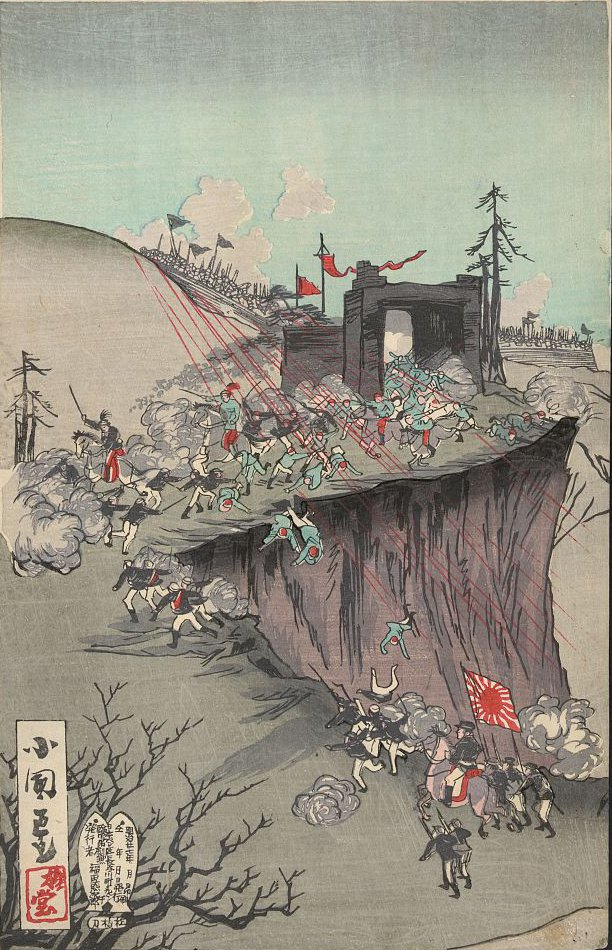
Print shows Japanese officers looking at maps and reviewing progress of battle taking place outside the fortress at Pyongyang.

Pyongyang Castle is one of the National Treasures of North Korea.

The castle was attacked by Geunchogo of Baekje in 375. In 427, Jangsu of Goguryeo transferred the Goguryeo capital from Gungnae Fortress (present-day Ji'an on the China-North Korea border) to Pyongyang Castle, (Note: It was in 427 that the capital was moved to Pyongyang, however the location of the capital moved slightly to the east from Anhak Palace in Pyongyang to the current location of the pyongyang castle in 586 after careful planning regarding constructions of the new pyongyang castle(a project organized by kagun) known as Janganseong since 522.) a more suitable region to grow into a burgeoning metropolitan capital, which led Goguryeo to achieve a high level of cultural and economic prosperity.

In 668, Pyongyang became the capital of the Protectorate General to Pacify the East established by the Tang dynasty of China. However, by 676, it was taken by Silla, but left on the border between Silla and Balhae. Pyongyang was left abandoned during the Later Silla period, until it was recovered by Wang Geon and decreed as the Western Capital of Goryeo. During the Joseon period, it became the provincial capital of Pyeongan Province.

During the Japanese invasions of Korea (1592–98), Pyongyang was captured by the Japanese and held until they were defeated in the Siege of Pyongyang. Later in the 17th century, it became temporarily occupied during the Qing invasion of Joseon until peace arrangements were made between Korea and Qing China. While the invasions made Koreans suspicious of foreigners, the influence of Christianity began to grow after the country opened itself up to foreigners in the 16th century. Pyongyang became the base of Christian expansion in Korea. By 1880 it had more than 100 churches and more Protestant missionaries than any other Asian city, and was called "the Jerusalem of the East".

In 1890, the city had 40,000 inhabitants. It was the site of the Battle of Pyongyang during the First Sino-Japanese War in 1894, which led to the destruction and depopulation of much of the city. It was the provincial capital of South Pyeongan Province beginning in 1896.

== See also ==
- Pyongyang
- Anhak Palace
- Taesong Fortress
