= Kim So-hyun filmography =

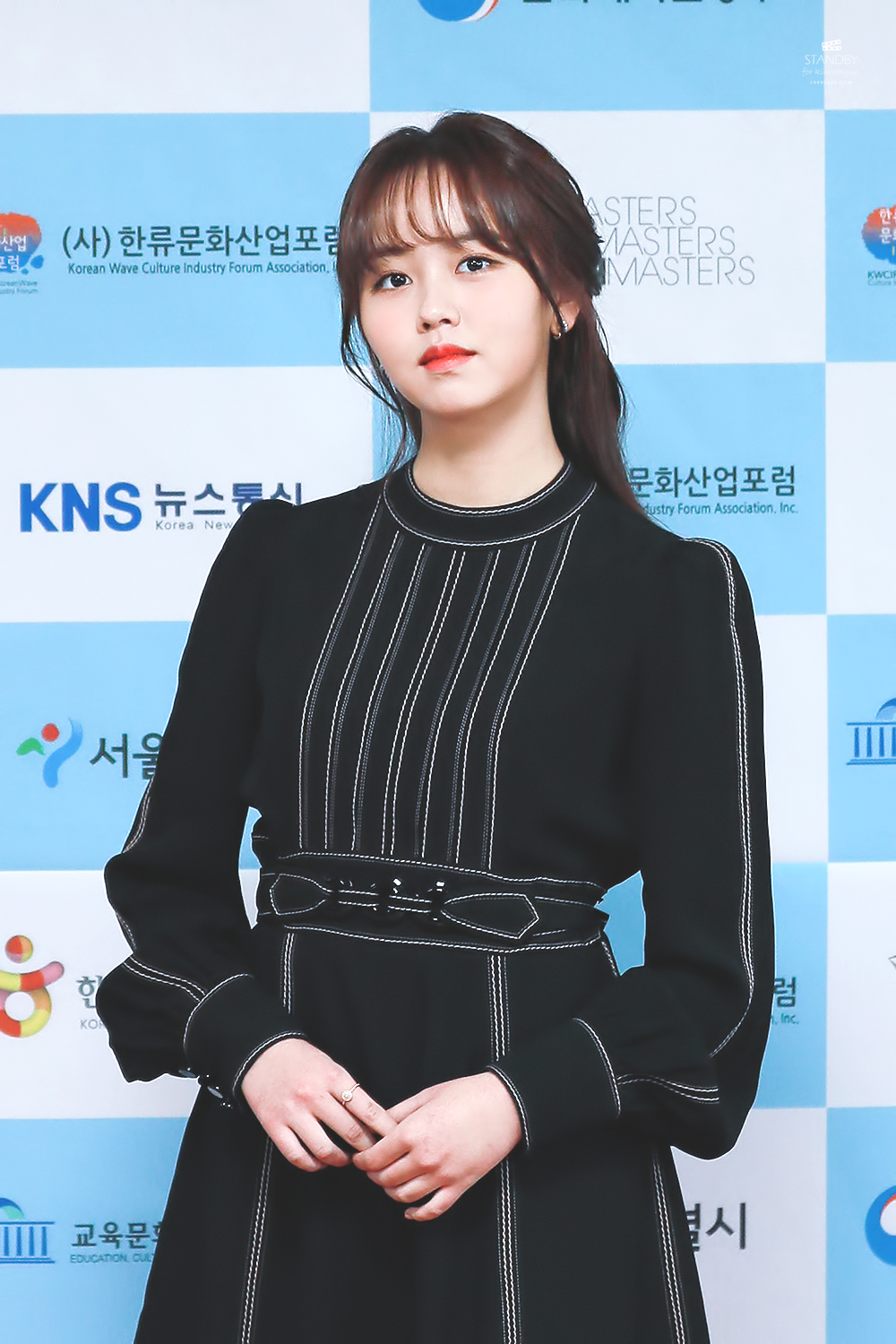
- Kim in 2017
- Film: 9
- Television series: 42
- Web series: 2
- Television show: 2
- Hosting: 9
- Music videos: 5
- Narrating: 2

Kim So-hyun (born June 4, 1999) is a South Korean actress known for her leading roles in the youth drama Who Are You: School 2015 (2015), historical melodramas The Emperor: Owner of the Mask (2017) and River Where the Moon Rises (2021), and the action-comedy Good Boy (2025).

== Film ==
Year	Title	Role	Notes	Ref.
2008	My Name Is Pity (마당 위의 아이)	young Jin-ha	Short film	
2010	Man of Vendetta	Joo Hye-rin		
2011	Sin of a Family	Jung Myung-hee		
2011	Spy Papa (스파이 파파)	Soon-bok		
2012	I Am the King	Sol-bi		
2013	Killer Toon	young Mi-sook		
2016	Pure Love	Jung Soo-ok		
2016	The Last Princess	teenage Princess Deokhye		
2017	Your Name	Mitsuha Miyamizu	Voice (Korean dub)	

== Television series ==
Key
†	Denotes television productions that have not yet been released

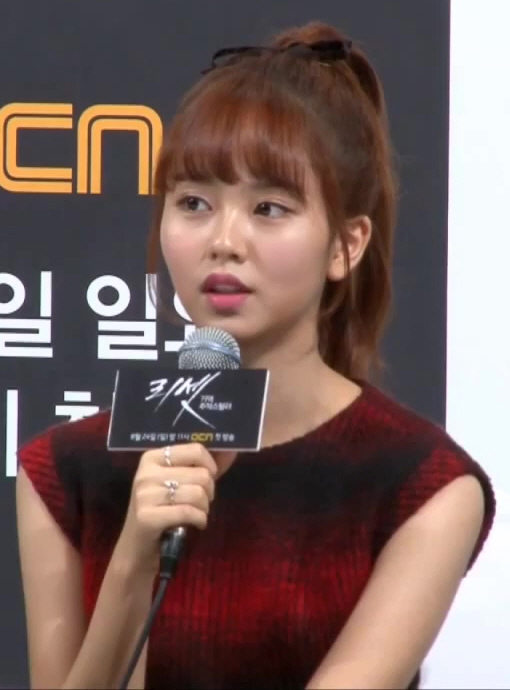
Kim at Reset's press conference in September 2014

Year	Title	Role	Notes	Ref.
2006	Drama City – "Ten Minute, Minor"			
2007	A Happy Woman	young Lee Ji-yeon		
2007	Que Sera Sera	young Han Eun-soo		
2008	Korean Ghost Stories	Yeon-hwa	episode: "Baby, Let's Go to Cheong Mountain"	
2008–2009	Wife and Woman	Jo Je-ni		
2009	Ja Myung Go	Myo-ri		
2009	The Children of Heaven	Kim Son-young	Fundraising campaign drama	
2009	Loving You a Thousand Times			
2010	Becoming a Billionaire	young Lee Shin-mi		
2010	Bread, Love and Dreams	young Gu Ja-rim		
2011	The Thorn Birds	young Seo Jung-eun		
2011	The Duo	young Geum-ok		
2011–2012	Padam Padam	young Jung Ji-na		
2012	Moon Embracing the Sun	young Yoon Bo-kyung		
2012	Rooftop Prince	young Hong Se-na / young Crown Princess Hwa-yong		
2012	Love Again	Jung Yoo-ri		
2012	Reckless Family 1	Kim So-hyun		
2012	Ma Boy	Jang Geu-rim		
2012–2013	Missing You	young Lee Soo-yeon		
2013	Iris II: New Generation	young Ji Soo-yeon		
2013	The Secret of Birth	young Jung Yi-hyun		
2013	I Can Hear Your Voice	young Jang Hye-sung		
2013	The Suspicious Housekeeper	Eun Han-gyul		
2014	Triangle	young Shin-hye		
2014	Reset	Choi Seung-hee / Jo Eun-bi		
2014	We All Cry Differently	Ryu Ji-hye	Drama special	
2015	A Girl Who Sees Smells	Choi Eun-seol	Cameo, episode 1-2 and 5	
2015	Who Are You: School 2015	Lee Eun-bi / Go Eun-byul		
2016	Page Turner	Yoon Yoo-seul	Drama special	
2016	Bring It On, Ghost	Kim Hyun-ji		
2016	Guardian: The Lonely and Great God	Queen Sun-hee / Kim Sun	Cameo, episode 1 and 7-9-10-11-13	
2016	Nightmare High	Kang Ye-rim		
2017	The Emperor: Owner of the Mask	Han Ga-eun		
2017	While You Were Sleeping	Park So-yoon	Cameo, Episode 3–8 and 32	
2018	Radio Romance	Song Geu-rim		
2019	The Tale of Nokdu	Dong Dong-joo / Eun-seo		
2019–2021	Love Alarm	Kim Jo-jo	Season 1–2	
2021	River Where the Moon Rises	Princess Pyeonggang / Yeom Ga-jin / Queen Yeon		
2023	My Lovely Liar	Mok Sol-hee		
2024	Serendipity's Embrace	Lee Hong-joo		
2025	Good Boy	Ji Han-na		
2026	Between Steps	Lim Yu-jin		

== Television shows ==
Year	Title	Role	Notes	Ref.
2014	100 People, 100 Songs, episode 1	Contestant		
2018	Because This Is My First Twenty: Kim So-hyun's YOLO SOLO California	Main cast		
2026	The Village Barber	Part-timer	Season 1	

== Hosting ==
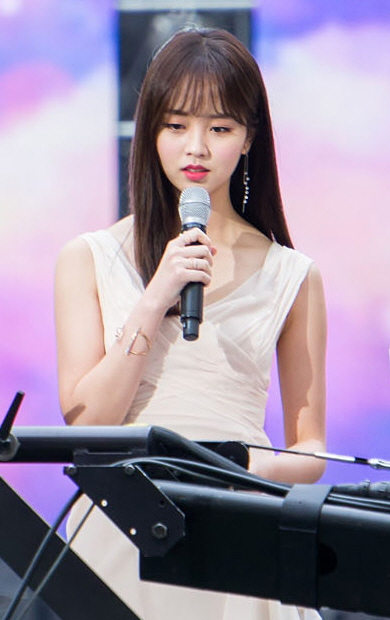
Kim at Dream Concert in June 2016

Year	Title	Notes	Ref.
2013–2015	Show! Music Core	with Noh Hong-chul, Choi Min-ho, and Zico	
2015	The Thousand Won Concert	Orchestra, with Shin-ik Hahm	
2015	KBS Drama Awards	with Jun Hyun-moo and Park Bo-gum	
2016	Dream Concert	with Leeteuk and Hong Jong-Hyun	
2016	Running Man	Christmas special, episode 331.	
2018	27th Seoul Music Awards	with Kim Hee-chul and Shin Dong-yup	
2018–2019	Under 19	Host & Official Supporter of the group	
2019	28th Seoul Music Awards	with Kim Hee-chul and Shin Dong-yup	
2021	KBS Drama Awards	with Sung Si-kyung and Lee Do-hyun	

== Narration ==
Year	Title	Ref.
2013	Global Homestay: The Way Home	
2018	2018 National Choice	

== Music video appearances ==
Year	Song title	Artist	Ref.
2012	"Let's Walk Together" (같이 걷자)	Touch	
2012	"Legend of Tears" (전설같은 이야기)	Hi.Ni	
2013	"I Yah" (아이야)	Boyfriend	
2021	"Should've Known" (가까이 있어서 몰랐어)	2AM	
2021	"No Good in Good-Bye" (잘 가라니)	2AM	
