= In-hye =

- Hangul: 인혜
- RR: Inhye
- MR: Inhye
- IPA: [inhe]

In-hye, also spelled In-hae, is a Korean given name.

== People ==
- Queen Dowager Inhye (1445–1499), second wife of King Yejong of Joseon
- Lee In-hye (born 1981), South Korean actress
- Oh In-hye (1984–2020), South Korean actress

== Fictional characters ==
- Lee In-hye, in 2005 South Korean television series My Lovely Sam Soon
- In-hye, in 2007 South Korean novel The Vegetarian
- Park In-hye, in 2008 South Korean television series Working Mom
- Yoo In-hye, in 2011 South Korean television series Midas
- Seo In-hye, in 2013 South Korean television series Two Weeks
- Jo In-hye, in 2020 South Korean television series Soul Mechanic
- Oh In-hye, in 2022 South Korean television series Little Women

== See also ==
- List of Korean given names
