= Pure Love (film) =

- Promotional poster
- Directed by: Lee Eun-hee
- Screenplay by: Han Chang-hoon; Lee Eun-hee
- Produced by: Jeong Mun-gu; Bang Mi-jung; Joo Pil-ho
- Starring: Doh Kyung-soo; Kim So-hyun
- Cinematography: Lee Joon-gyoo
- Edited by: Kim Hyeong-joo
- Production company: Jupiter Film
- Distributed by: Little Big Pictures
- Release date: February 24, 2016
- Running time: 113 minutes
- Country: South Korea
- Language: Korean
- Box office: US$1.5 million

Pure Love (Korean: 순정; RR: Sunjeong), released internationally as Unforgettable, is a 2016 South Korean romantic drama film starring Doh Kyung-soo and Kim So-hyun. It is based on the short story titled '저 먼 과거 속의 소녀 (The Girl in the Distant Past)' by novelist Han Changhoon. The film was commercially successful.

== Plot ==
In 2014, a radio DJ gets a letter from his first love that brings up almost-forgotten memories of the past.

23 years ago in 1991, five friends spend the summer together. One of them, shy and innocent Beom-sil falls in love with Soo-ok. Beom-sil has a noticeable crush on Soo-ok and waits by the girl's window during the summer. Soo-ok suffers from a leg injury that renders her unable to walk properly so she is always carried by Beom-sil. The love blossoms and how he always sees her as the girl he had want to marry.

== Cast ==
- Doh Kyung-soo as Beom-sil
  - Park Yong-woo as Hyung-joon / adult Beom-sil
- Kim So-hyun as Soo-ok
- Lee David as Gae-duk
  - Lee Beom-soo as Yong-chul / adult Gae-duk
- Joo Da-young as Gil-ja
  - Kim Ji-ho as adult Gil-ja
- Yeon Joon-seok as San-dol
  - Park Hae-joon as Min-ho / adult San-dol
- Lee Dae-yeon as Soo-ok's father
- Park Choong-sun as Bum-shil's father
- Hwang Young-hee as Bum-shil's mother
- Hwang Seok-jeong as Gae-duk's mother
- Park Jung-min as Yong-soo
- Kim Kwon as Young-il
- Kim Hyun as Woman 1
- Yoon Jung-ro as Writer Park

== Production ==
Pure Love is based on a short story by Han Changhoon, who based it on a true story. Initially, the film was set to take place in Geomundo, Yeosu, as Han was from there. However, director Lee Eun-hee decided to film in her hometown of Goheung instead, which was in a recession at the time. The main idea of the film came from her realization "what if a 40-year-old man recalls the moment when he was 17?". This was also her directorial debut.

Park Yong-woo was among the first actors to be cast. On May 29, 2015, Doh Kyung-soo, Kim So-hyun, Lee David, Yeon Joon-seok, and Joo Da-young were announced to be joining the cast. Park Hae-joon and Kim Ji-ho were confirmed to round out the cast, with a cameo from Lee Beom-soo. A month before filming, the actors were trained in Jeolla dialect. Producer Joo Pil-ho encouraged the use of this dialect to correct stereotypes of this dialect, which had been associated with "gangsters" and "poor people" in mass media.

Filming began on 22 June 2015 in Goheung County, South Jeolla Province. During days when there was no filming, Kim So-hyun would explore Goheung and listen to the residents' stories in order to get to know the village better. Throughout filming, whether the cameras were rolling or not, director Lee Eun-hee encouraged the main leads to always hold hands. In one of the scenes where Doh Kyung-soo had to carry Kim So-hyun, he did it on a broken ankle, as he had injured it during Exo's concert overseas.

The film used a mix of popular English and Korean songs from the 1980s including Kansas's "Dust in the Wind", A-ha's "Take on Me", Shin Hae-chul's "Summer Story", and Kang Soo-ji's "Purple Fragrance". "Purple Fragrance" was sung by Kim So-hyun featuring drums by Park Yong-woo.

50% of the film's profits were donated to UNICEF.

== Release ==
Pure Love premiered in theaters on February 24, 2016. It was released internationally as Unforgettable. Fans of Doh Kyung-soo opened a temporary movie theater in CGV Yeouido to celebrate the film's release.

== Reception ==
The Hollywood Reporter described it as "a bittersweet coming-of-age tragic romance", but with less emotional impact due to its direction and performances. Doh's performance was called out, as he "...never manages to infuse Bumsil with anything beyond surly teen angst".

== Awards and nominations ==
Year	Award	Category	Recipient	Result
2016	52nd Baeksang Arts Awards	Most Popular Actor (Film)	Do Kyung-soo	Won

== Legacy ==
Photographer Song Jeong-geun published a photo book titled 'Pure Love' containing the scenery of the filming locations.
