= Kim Sun-woong =

South Korean actor

- Born: Kim Sun-woong; 1 November 1991 (age 35); Ansan, South Korea
- Other names: Seon Ung, Kim Seon Ung
- Occupations: Actor; singer; model
- Years active: 2009–present
- Agent: Will Entertainment
- Known for: Ma Boy; Thumping Spike 2 Love Returns
- Spouse: Park Na-rae (m. 2024)

Korean name
- Hangul: 김선웅
- RR: Gim Seonung
- MR: Kim Sŏnung

Kim Sun-woong (Korean: 김선웅; born November 1, 1991) is a South Korean singer and actor. He is a former member of the South Korean boy band Touch. Kim is known for his lead roles in Ma Boy and Thumping Spike 2. Kim also appeared in the movie Do You Love.

== Personal life ==
On April 28, 2024, Kim announced his marriage to former SPICA member Park Na-rae. The couple married on May 18, 2024.

== Filmography ==
=== Television ===
Year	Title	Role	Ref.
2011	I Believe in Love	Idol group RDM member	
2012	Ma Boy	Irene / Hyun-woo	
2014	You Are My Destiny	Moon Woo-bin	
2014	Blade Man	Kyung-ho	
2015	All About My Mom	Min-sun	
2016	Legend Hero	Zhuge Liang	
2016	Cinderella with Four Knights	Hyun-min's Friend	
2016	Thumping Spike 2	Go Yi-ra	
2017	Love Returns	Oh Dae-young	
2022	It's Beautiful Now	Bong Food worker	
2022	Woori the Virgin	Noh Man-cheol	

=== Film ===
Year	Title	Role	Language	Ref.
2016	Legend Hero Three Kingdom	Zhuge Liang	Korean	
2018	Are We In Love?	Jang	Korean	
2019	Unalterable	Kim Geon	Korean	
2020	Do You Love	Byung Oh	Korean	
2025	Romance	Song Representative	Korean	
