= Kim So-hyun =

South Korean actress (born 1999)

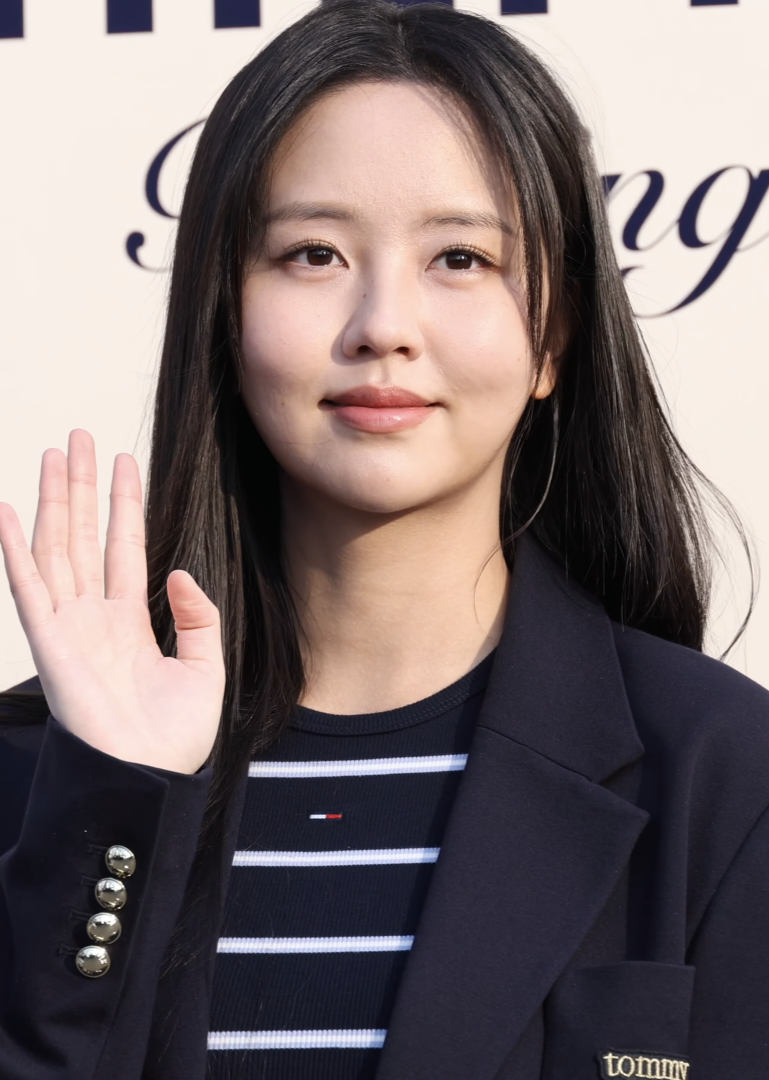
- Kim in October 2025
- Born: 4 June 1999 (age 27); Australia
- Citizenship: South Korea
- Education: Hanyang University
- Occupations: Actress; television presenter; model
- Years active: 2006–present
- Agent: Peachy
- Works: Full list

Korean name
- Hangul: 김소현
- Hanja: 金所炫
- RR: Gim Sohyeon
- MR: Kim Sohyŏn
- Website: peachy.im

Signature
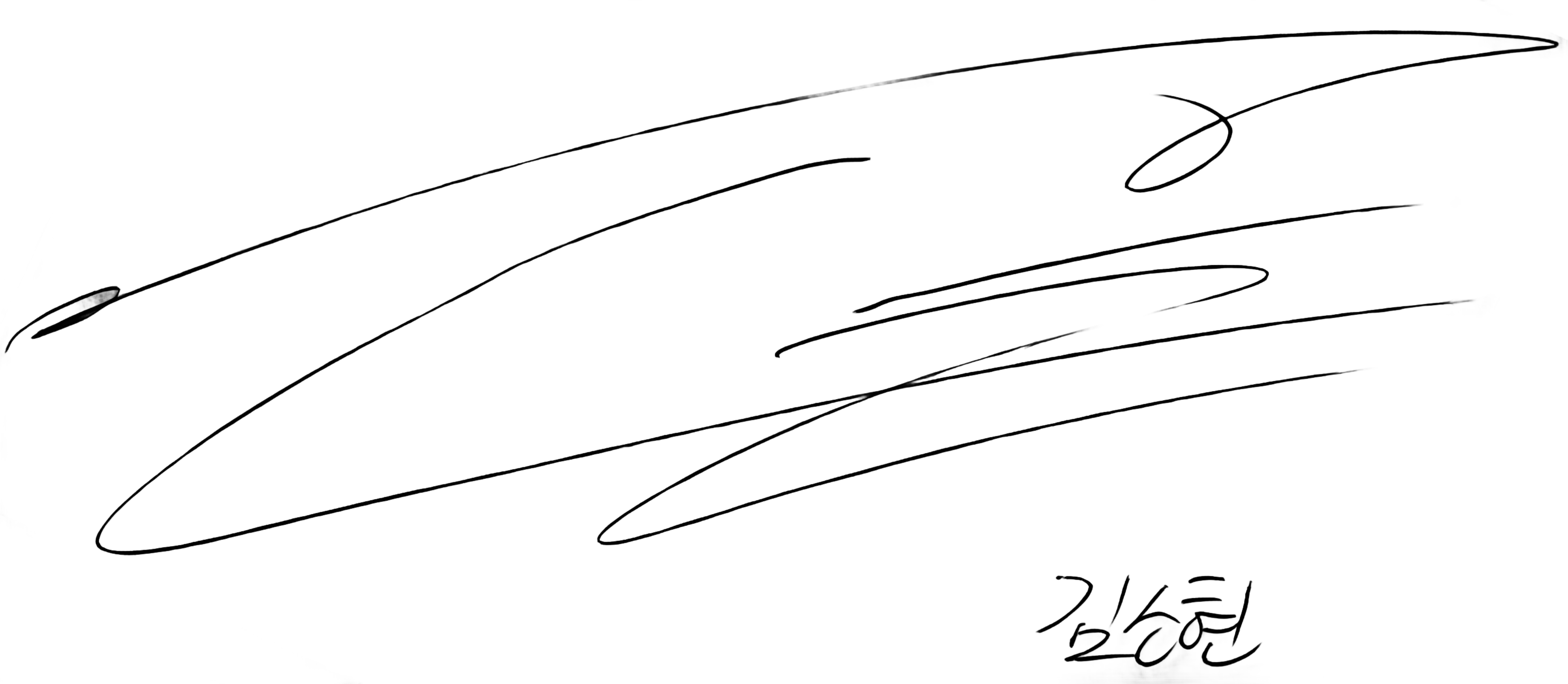

Kim So-hyun (Korean: 김소현; born 4 June 1999) is an Australian-born South Korean actress. She is known for her leading roles in the youth drama Who Are You: School 2015 (2015), historical melodramas The Emperor: Owner of the Mask (2017) and River Where the Moon Rises (2021), romantic drama Love Alarm (2019), and the action-comedy Good Boy (2025).

Kim began her career as a child actress in 2006, initially gaining attention for her appearances in Moon Embracing the Sun (2012) and Missing You (2013). She took on her first leading role in teen drama Ma Boy (2012) and transitioned into adult roles in several television series. She also hosted MBC's music program Music Core (2013–2015).

== Early life and education ==
Kim So-hyun was born on 4 June 1999, in Australia, and has a younger brother. She moved to South Korea in 2003, when she was four years old. Her father died when she was nine.

Kim transferred from Hoeryong Elementary School in Gyeonggi Province to Towol Elementary School and graduated in February 2012. She then graduated from Yongin Munjung Middle School in 2015. She was subsequently homeschooled for secondary education, and passed her high school graduation exams by 2017. The same year, she enrolled at Hanyang University's Department of Theatre, through rolling admission. Kim attended the 79th entrance ceremony held at Hanyang University in Seongdong District, Seoul on 28 February 2018.

In 2016, according to Singapore's national newspaper The Straits Times, Kim revealed in an email interview with the paper why she chose homeschooling instead of enrolling in high school. She said that while managing her acting career, she barely had time to study during her middle school days (which made her have to take her exams unprepared) and missed out in activities with her classmates, and this similarly occurred in her elementary school days. Kim chose homeschooling for her high school education because she did not want to give up her education and career. With this decision, Kim felt it would allow her to dedicate more time to both filming and studying.

== Career ==
=== 2006–2011: Beginnings as a child actress ===
Kim debuted as a child actress in 2006, playing a supporting role in the Drama City special "Ten Minute Minor". Then, she diligently increased her appearances from A Happy Woman (2007), Que Sera Sera (2007), Hometown of Legends (2008), My Name Is Pity (2008), Wife and Woman (2009) and Ja Myung Go (2009).

She signed a management contract with SidusHQ in 2010. That year, she would go on to be cast in Becoming a Billionaire and Bread, Love and Dreams. Kim was confirmed to make her big-screen debut in Man of Vendetta (2010) as Joo Hye-rin, a daughter of a well-respected pastor who gets kidnapped. Kim was cast through a competition of 500:1. She continued to portray the child counterparts of the female protagonists in television series such as The Thorn Birds (2011), The Duo (2011) and Sin of a Family (2011). She then starred in a family comedy film, Spy Papa, about parents and children's relationship during inter-Korean relations in 1974.

=== 2012–2014: Rising popularity and teenage roles ===
In 2012, Kim appeared in six works in the first half of the year: a romantic fantasy television series, Padam Padam; a historical comedy film, I Am the King; a fantasy-period drama Moon Embracing the Sun, in which she gained recognition as the younger version of the second female lead, Kim received commend from the audience and the director of how well she portrayed the antagonist's desire realistically the drama came to rank number one in its time slot throughout its run and achieved a peak recorded viewer rating of 42.2%, thereby earning the "national drama" status Kim simultaneously became "Korea's little sister"; followed by a fantasy-comedy Rooftop Prince in the role as an evil sister; Love Again and a high school student whose roommate is a female idol star in Ma Boy.

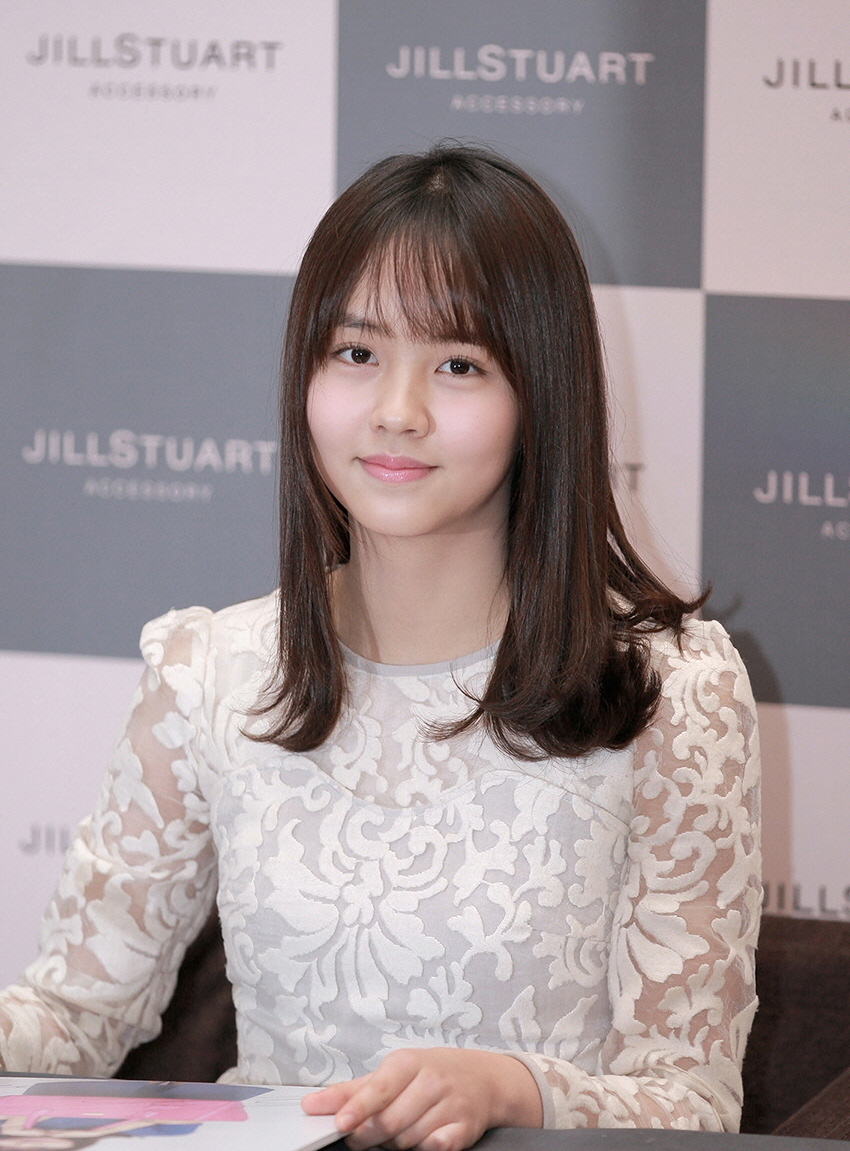
Kim in January 2014

Kim reunited with co-stars from Rooftop Prince (Park Yoo-chun) and Moon Embracing the Sun (Yeo Jin-goo) respectively, in a melodrama Missing You. Being dubbed the "Queen of Child Actors" (아역퀸) by the Korean press, she was one of the most praised child actors of her generation. She played the role of Lee Soo-yeon, bullied by her schoolmates and called "the daughter of the murderer", who gets kidnapped and sexually assaulted while trying to save her friend. Kim and Yeo shared the highest one-minute viewer rating scene of 10.4% in the drama. She received her first acting award as "Best Child Actress" at the 1st K-Drama Star Awards for Ma Boy and Missing You.

In 2013, Kim made a surprise appearance on Iris II: New Generation as the childhood counterpart of the female protagonist and starred in The Secret of Birth as a girl with a genius-level brain. Then, she played the younger version of Lee Bo-young's character in the popular Korean drama I Can Hear Your Voice. On 20 June, Kim co-host MBC's music program Music Core along with Minho of SHINee and Noh Hong-chul. The three received much attention because of the combination of singers, actors, and broadcasters even though they initially showed a bit of immature progress, but amplified expectations of how they expressed their charms despite having different careers. She then was cast in The Suspicious Housekeeper, a Korean remake of the Japanese drama, Kaseifu no Mita. In the same year, Kim was reported along with Kim You-jung and Yeo Jin-goo as the top three child actors who earn above-average salaries for child actors. It was reported that Kim received 4-6 million won per episode.

In 2014, Kim was cast as a child actor beside Oh Yeon-soo in the MBC drama, Triangle. Kim challenged her first dual role and first genre through OCN's new drama Reset. Later, she was cast in KBS2 special drama, We All Cry Differently, which won the 2013 KBS Screenplay Contest.

=== 2015–2016: Transition to leading roles and hosting ===
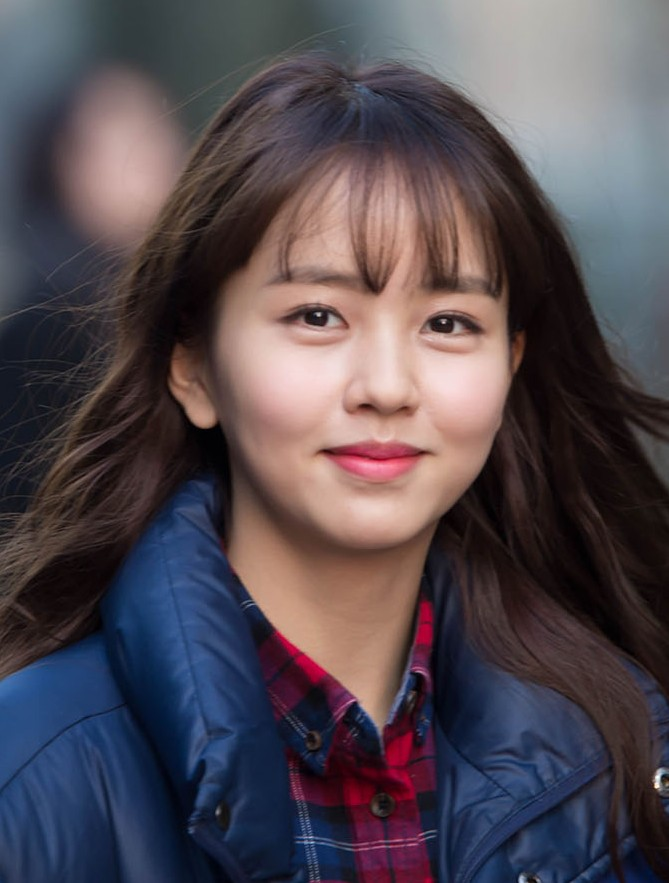
Kim in January 2015

In 2015, Kim made a special appearance as the sister of the male lead in A Girl Who Sees Smells, played by Park Yoo-chun, whom she reunited with for the third time after Rooftop Prince and Missing You. On 18 April, Kim stepped down from her Music Core host posts after two years. Kim starred in KBS's school series Who Are You: School 2015, playing dual roles as twins Lee Eun-bi and Go Eun-byul. She was awarded "Star of the Year" at the eighth Korea Drama Awards for her performance. On 21 November, Kim held her first overseas promotion schedule at Sunshine City, Hong Kong. At the end of the year, Kim became the host of the 2015 KBS Drama Awards with Jun Hyun-moo and Park Bo-gum.

In 2016, she returned to the big screen in a romance film Pure Love opposite Do Kyung-soo, playing the heroine of the film who has a beautiful voice but suffers from a leg injury. Kim then starred in a mystery-school web drama Nightmare Teacher alongside Lee Min-hyuk, playing a class president who discovers mysterious secrets of the school. The drama was filmed and featured nine students at Hosan University. The same year, Kim starred in Park Hye-ryun's three-episode drama special Page Turner opposite actors Ji Soo and Shin Jae-ha. She played the role of a "piano genius" who lost her sight after an accident. The number of video previews released in the web and mobile achieved 600,000 views which was considered "an unusual number" as a one-act play. She was dubbed as the "Korean Wave Fairy" by the Taiwanese media. On 4 June, Kim hosted the 2016 Dream Concert with Leeteuk and Hong Jong-hyun. She made her next acting move in the horror-comedy Hey Ghost, Let's Fight with Ok Taec-yeon, and played as the 13-year-old Princess Deokhye in the film The Last Princess, for which Park A-reum of K-pop Herald praised Kim for her in-depth emotional acting in the scene before her farewell to her mother (which Park called heartbreaking), as well as the high sync rate with Son Ye-jin. Also, Jung An-ji of Sports Chosun praised her for the historical accuracy of portraying the princess: citing she acted "perfectly" with the life of a girl during the Korean Empire. She had a recurring guest role in the hit fantasy drama Guardian: The Lonely and Great God. Kim showed an overwhelming presence and increased audience immersion in the early stage of the show, making a big impact as a cameo.

=== 2017–2020: Adult roles and career fluctuations ===
In 2017, Kim participated in Korean dubbing for the character Mitsuha Miyamizu in the anime drama film Your Name. She switched back to live-action and co-led the historical and political drama The Emperor: Owner of the Mask with Yoo Seung-ho, which premiered on 10 May. This marked her first adult historical drama after five years since Moon Embracing the Sun. Despite its high ratings, the time of the drama's original run coincided with her slump period — Kim expressed how she made efforts to understand her character as a heroine. She felt lost and started losing confidence in herself as an actress. As everybody was praising her acting and visual, she felt embarrassed because she could not come to a full understanding of who her character was.

Kim suffered with "growing pains" and "transition period" after seven months of filming The Emperor: Owner of the Mask. She felt emptiness in her schedule and felt uncomfortable even though she was resting.

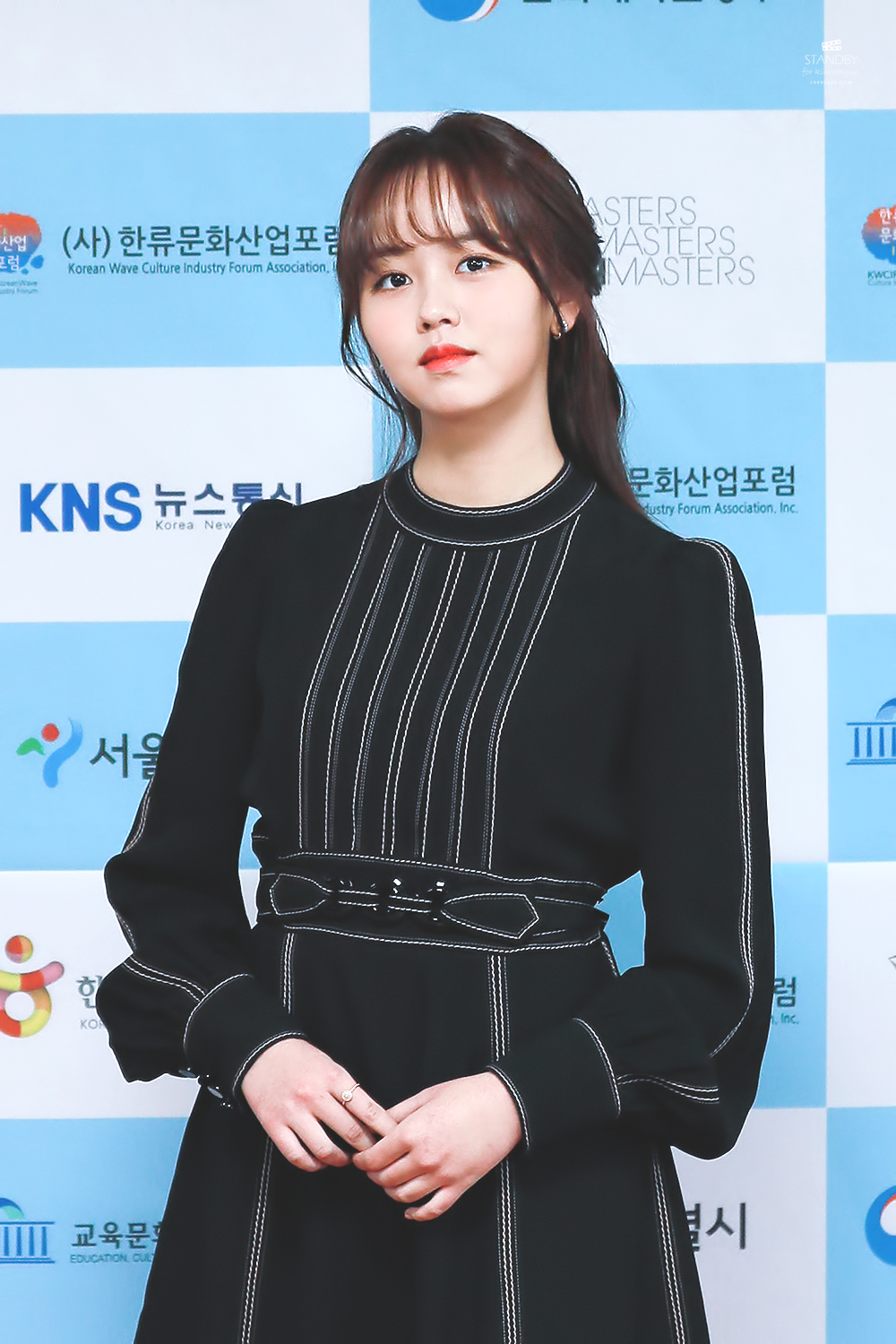
Kim in December 2017

She made a special appearance in drama While You Were Sleeping to show her support for scriptwriter Park Hae-ryun, who she worked with on KBS's Page Turner. In August 2017, she ended her contract with SidusHQ after seven years. In December, Kim launched her one-person agency, E&T Story Entertainment, in partnership with LOEN Entertainment. The agency is currently led by Park Chan-woo, Kim's manager in her SidusHQ days.

In 2018, Kim was cast in the romance drama Radio Romance, which began airing on 29 January. She played a radio scriptwriter who isn't exactly talented in writing. On 24 January, a photo was shared on SNS saying that Kim was shooting underwater. The photo shows a woman wearing a hanbok in the water on 21 January. On this day, the lowest temperature was recorded below minus 16 degrees. During the press conference for the premiere of Radio Romance held on 25 January, the PD addressed online criticism regarding the outdoor water filming, despite the weather warnings. He issued an apology stating that "Kim So Hyun's outdoor water filming wrapped up on Sunday [21 January]. We debated on it a lot since she would be getting in the water. We ensured safety equipment nearby and a camping car on set and finished filming in the shortest amount of time possible. Due to time constraints, an action stunt double filmed additional outdoor water scenes yesterday [24 January]. It was filmed by an action actor, not Kim So-hyun, wearing a winter suit and shot in a similar situation. The number of shots was done with one take and protection was taken right away. We apologize for causing concerns with this matter. The filming set is our lives. Naturally, safety is important." At the press conference, Kim's hand was visually seen red.

On the same day, she co-hosted the 27th Seoul Music Awards with Kim Hee-chul and Shin Dong-yup. After 10 years of debut, Kim hosted her own travel reality show Because This is My First Twenty - Kim So-hyun's YOLO Solo California, where she challenged herself and discovered her true identity in a foreign country. On October, she was named as one of the first tenth generation hosts to host a survival reality show Under Nineteen on MBC. Kim received positive feedback from viewers of the premiere for her strengths as a host, as noted by Korea Economic TV — audience engagement, her "steady" voice, charisma, as well as her styling, which the publication deemed "colorful".

By early-2019, Kim, Kim Hee-chul and Shin Dong-yup were selected for two consecutive years as the hosts for the Seoul Music Awards, hosting the 28th ceremony. Kim played the lead role in Netflix's original production Love Alarm, based on the popular webtoon of the same name. Kim explained her character is experiencing the emotion of love for the first time, and it reminded of herself. She decided to tap into those feelings as she wanted to portray a living and breathing character with Jo-jo. Kim Yoo-jin of Exsports News said that Kim showed a high sync rate and a "rich and stable" acting performance in the series. Forbes's Joan MacDonald said that Kim fit well with the character Jojo. Further, the Netflix series was ranked the platform's 8th most loved work in South Korea in 2019.

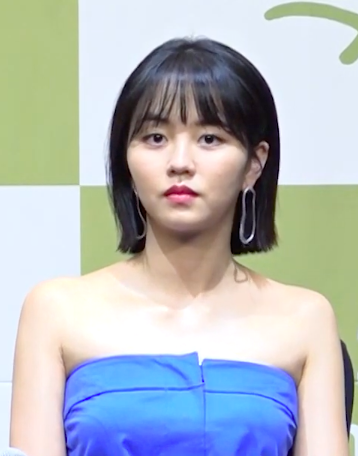
Kim during The Tale of Nokdu press conference in 2019

The same year, she was cast alongside Jang Dong-yoon in a romantic comedy drama set in the Joseon period, The Tale of Nokdu as a clumsy and hot-tempered Kisaeng trainee. Chon Kye-young and Hye Jin-yang, the author of both webtoons named Kim as their first choice in casting the leading woman. Shin Ji-won of Hankyung said that Kim So-hyun's character was able to mesmerize the viewers because Kim blended well with her character. Jang Dong-yoon stated, "I was convinced that there would be no better actress to play Dong Joo other than So-hyun, I was very grateful to have met my best partner in her." The pair were donned the nickname "Manhwa tearing" chemistry by the viewers for capturing everything from laughter to excitement and adding their colours to the original characters. Her role as Dong Joo earned her the Excellence Award at the year end KBS Drama Awards. The series was the 10th most talked primetime Korean dramas aired in 2019.

On 1 October, an official statement from Kakao M revealed that Kim received 815 shares (about 100 million won) of it to resolve issue rights to strengthen solidarity with affiliates and entertainers. Kim is one of many Kakao M-affiliated artists who received stocks from the company, which, according to reports, is preparing to rejoin Korea Exchange through a re-IPO. On 29 October, Netflix confirmed that Kim would reprise her role as Kim Jo-jo in the second season of the drama series Love Alarm.

In 2020, Kim's travel reality show Because This Is My First Twenty surpassed 6 million views as of May 2020 on YouTube, Naver TV and Facebook. On 15 January 2021, E&T Story Entertainment released an official statement stating that Kim would be leaving the agency. On 18 January, Kim signed an exclusive contract with the Culture Depot.

=== 2021–present: River Where the Moon Rises and Good Boy and Between Steps ===
In February 2021, Kim starred as the alter-ego protagonists in the historical drama River Where the Moon Rises which premiered on 15 February. She plays as a female general, who was born as a princess but raised as a general, and chases for her goal to straighten the ruined status of her country, Goguryeo. She gained praises for her solid performance and sword skills, and her portrayal of three different characters; Assassin Yeom Ga-jin, Princess Pyeonggang and the queen of Goguryeo Queen Yeon, for which she was nominated for a Baeksang Arts Awards in Best Actress - Television, becoming one of the category's youngest nominees. At the end of the year, Kim became the host of the 2021 KBS Drama Awards with Sung Si-kyung and Lee Do-hyun This is a return to hosting in 6 years since 2015.

In 2022, Kim signed with Ieum Hashtag. In July 2023, she returned to the small screen with the tvN romantic comedy series My Lovely Liar, She also starred in the webtoon-based romantic comedy-drama Serendipity's Embrace along with Chae Jong-hyeop and directed by Song Hyun-wook, where she played a woman who meets her first love again after ten years.

In 2025, she starred opposite Park Bo-gum in the JTBC action-comedy television series Good Boy directed by Shim Na-yeon.

In 2026, She starred as Lim Yu-jin in the ENA television series Between Steps, alongside Choo Young-woo. The series marked the final directorial work of Ahn Pan-seok. Kim portrayed a graduate student who finds a new career path after experiencing uncertainty about her future. The series follows the romance between two graduate students working in a university robotics laboratory.

== Other activities ==
=== Philanthropy ===
Kim has participated in numerous charitable activities to support vulnerable groups and children. In 2014, she participated in the "HAPPY Together Coal Donation Campaign," providing coal briquettes for heating to the elderly, people with disabilities, and low-income families during winter. Subsequently, Kim and Ji Chang-wook donated their dubbing fees for the film Your Name to the Korea Barrier-Free Film Commission in 2017. Her later charitable activities included participation included the Green Heart Bazaar organized by K-pop girl group, S.E.S. The proceeds from this event were used to support the Green Umbrella Children's Foundation and the KARA..

Kim So-hyun has also taken part in charitable activities relating to disaster relief and public health. Following the 2019 Sokcho fire, she donated ₩10 million to assist those affected by the disaster. Later that year, Kim donated 100 kg of rice to the social welfare corporation network for underprivileged and undernourished children in the future.

During the COVID-19 pandemic in South Korea, Kim donated ₩10 million through Hope Bridge for the National Disaster Relief Association to support vulnerable groups and purchase hygiene and infection-control supplies.. Later that same year, Kim donated a further ₩20 million to assist victims affected by torrential rain and flooding. Kim also participated in the "MANNA Charity Bazaar" that year to support the treatment costs of children suffering from rare diseases.

=== Endorsements ===
Kim's early commercial endorsements covered a range of consumer products, including fashion and food. Her first endorsements included fabric softener Downy and junior apparel brand Apple Pink. She later became a model for the Nintendo 3DS real-time pet simulation video game, Nintendogs + Cats with Kim You-jung, and represented Yuhan-Kimberly's "Teen's Nature" brand, Union Bay with Park Seo-joon and Lee Hyun-woo, and Nongshim's Shin Ramyun with Yoon Doo-joon.

Following the broadcast of Who Are You: School 2015, Kim's commercial endorsement activities increased in 2015.She became a model for the women's clothing brand Soupand was selected as the 25th "Pocari Girl" for Pocari Sweat. One event associated with the campaign later attracted attention on social media when a Uijeongbu High School student recreated Kim's signature drinking pose in his graduation photograph, which Kim retweeted and commented on. Dong-A Otsuka subsequently gave the student Pocari Sweat and Oronamin C products and named him the "Pocari Man". During this period, Kim also appeared in Domino's Pizza advertisements with Kim Woo-bin. and two costumes from the campaign were later auctioned online, with the proceeds donated to the Green Umbrella Children's Foundation. She also appeared in advertisements for Post Honey Oh's cereal and represented the school uniform Elitefrom 2014 to 2016, working alongside Winner, Shin Ae-ra,, and BtoB.

In 2016, Kim So-hyun continued to be the spokesperson for Pocari Sweat and once again served as the model for the brand's 30th anniversary celebration, becoming the first model to consecutively represent the brand for two years since Sun Ye-jin in 2001. In the same year, she was also selected as a model for G-Market and participated in its integrated advertising campaign through cable TV and online platforms.

From 2015 to 2017, Kim So-hyun also served as the spokesperson for the makeup brand Peripera. and other products related to this advertising campaign also achieved high sales and were recognized in the Glowpick Beauty Awards. After that, Kim So-hyun continued to collaborate with Soup, serving as the promotional model in the brand's 2019 Fall/Winter collection; at that time, it was reported that the brand's sales in South Korea reached ₩100 billion.

Kim So-hyn commercial endorsements have covered various fields such as fashion, food, finance and cosmetics, including

Pelicana Chicken, Samsung Securities, naturalism-oriented cosmetics Hanyul, Bausch & Lomb's Lacelle, colored contact lenses and the Soup she has been endorsing since 2015.Subsequently, her commercial activities expanded into the digital services sector. In 2020, Samsung Electronics launched Bixby Celebrity Voice, and Kim So-hyun was one of the voices for its AI voice assistant. Her voice was also used in the "Celeb Alarm" service, which once topped the popular download chart on the Galaxy Store. In 2022, she was selected as the global ambassador for the skin care brand JM Solution.

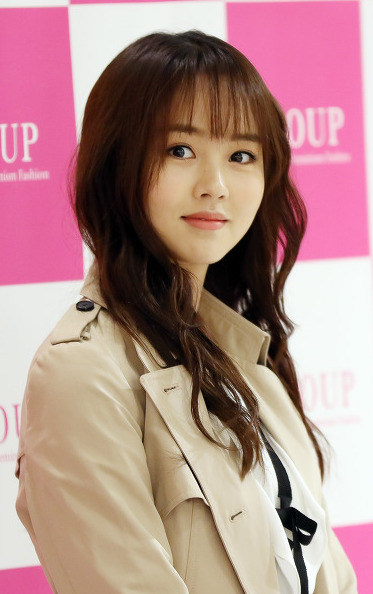
Kim at a Soup event on September 24, 2016

Since 2024 F/W season, she was selected as the new brand muse/ambassador for MARHEN.J, participating in various bag and fashion pictorials, campaigns, and flagship store events. She served as a brand ambassador for Merz Aesthetics Korea, a global medical aesthetics company

=== Ambassadorship ===
In January 2018, the Pyeongchang Organizing Committee for the 2018 Olympic & Paralympic Winter Games (POCOG) chose Kim and Yoo Seong-min as the National Representative of Honorary Smile to represent Korea's smile and kindness.

Year	Work/Activity	With	Ref.
2013	Honor Peer Counselling Ambassador	—N/a	
2013	Prevention of School Violence	—N/a	
2014	Korean Language and Culture Youth Ambassador	Oh Jae-moo	
2014	Korea Guardian Angel	—N/a	
2015	Prevention of School Violence	Who Are You: School 2015's cast	
2016	2016 Festive Korea Ambassador	—N/a	
2018	National Representative of Honorary Smile	Yoo Seong-min	

== Reception and acting style ==
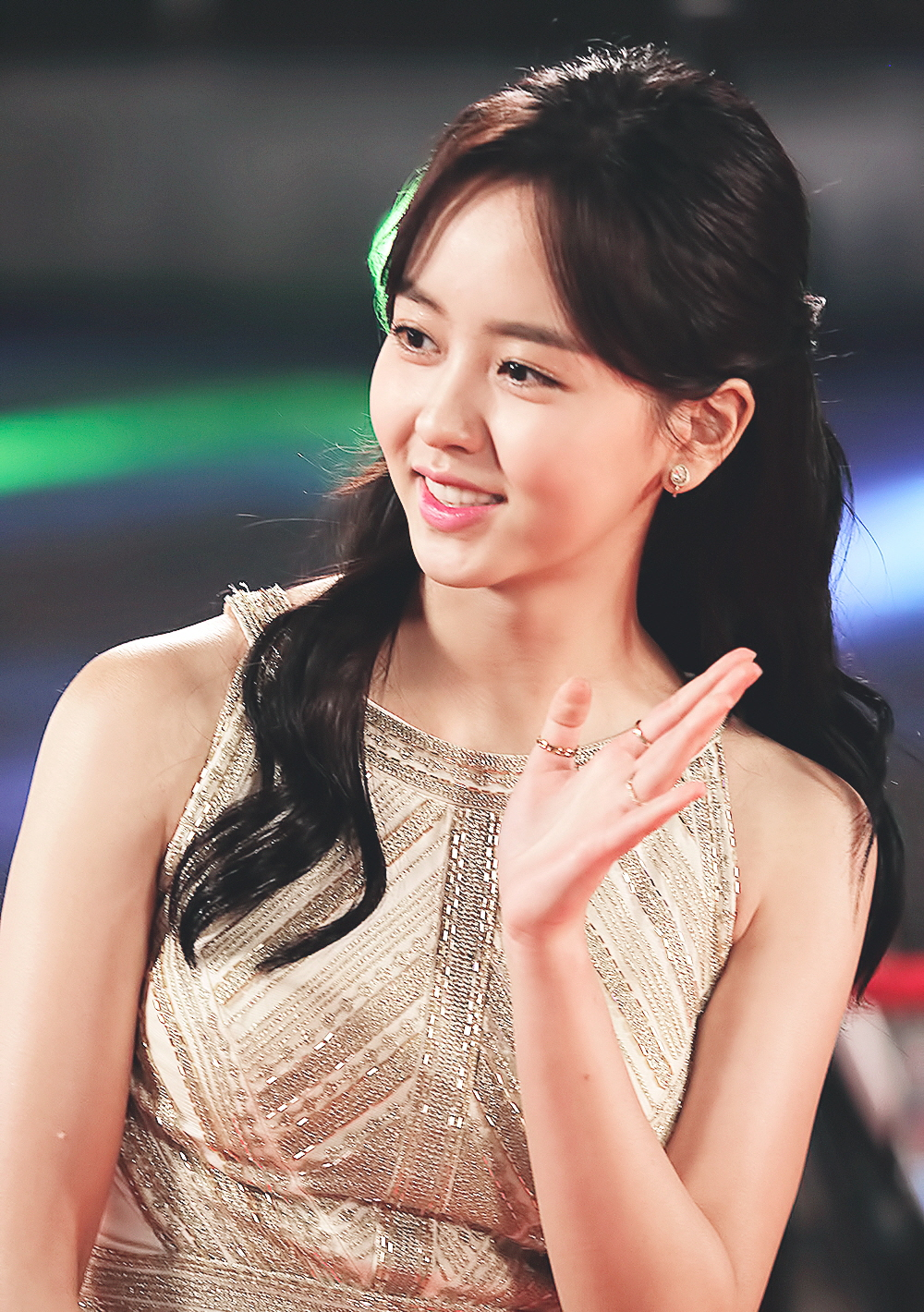
Kim at the 2016 KBS Drama Awards

Who Are You: School 2015 co-star Yook Sung-jae shared, "Despite her young age, [Kim] So-hyun leads the entire drama. When seeing her with a smile on her face during working in spite of the exhaustion due to lack of sleep, I feel and learn a lot."

Despite the freezing temperatures during filming The Emperor: Owner of the Mask, Kim gave affection for the child actor that was working with her, be on set at a very early time and showed no signs of tiredness while on set. A staff member said, "Kim So-hyun is cheerful and kind both on and off-camera, making her the best energizer. Kim So-hyun's bright smile helps everyone on set have a good time while filming."

Song Kang talked about working with Kim, saying that she gave a lot of advice about many heart-fluttering points. As a senior actor he saw on TV, he was worried that it would inconvenience her. Still, she contacted him whenever there were difficult scenes and congratulated him at the end of the day.

Kim has cited Son Ye-jin and Canadian actress Rachel McAdams as her main influences because of their sophisticated and graceful look. She has also cited Moon Geun-young as someone who inspired her to digest various roles after watching Moon's acting in Painter of the Wind. In 2019, Kim expressed that she has no role models. She commented, "I don't even know myself. I think it's time to get to know myself more than the role model. If I find myself, I can find my role model then." Kim's work has influenced numerous child actresses, including Kim Ji-young, Lee Ja-in, Hwang Yeon-ji, Busters' Jisoo, Jeon Yu-lim, and Park Da-yeon.

In an interview in 2013, she revealed she had never been formally trained for acting. While filming for Pure Love, she lived in Goheung. Kim said that, when there was no filming, she went around the city alone and listened to the stories of the residents. She explained she looked around every corner of the village setting for how she could be part of it. To prepare for a role, Kim listens to music that matches the emotions of her role before shooting a scene. For the role of a blind person in Page Turner, she changed everything from the tone and way of speaking to the eye contact when reciting her dialogues.

She had stated that when she received a script, she set plenty of time to understand fully and know the character like a real person and try her best to express the character genuinely. Kim prefers having many projects because she feels more comfortable and happy continuing acting rather than resting.

== Filmography ==
Selected filmography

- Who Are You: School 2015 (2015)
- Bring It On, Ghost (2016)
- The Emperor: Owner of the Mask (2017)
- Love Alarm (2019–2021)
- The Tale of Nokdu (2019)
- River Where the Moon Rises (2021)
- Good Boy (2025)

== Discography ==
=== Soundtrack appearances ===
Song title	Year	Work	Ref.
"You Better Not Cry" (as 4Angel)	2007		
"Family Picture"	2011	Sin of a Family	
"Daddy and Me"	2011	Spy Papa	
"First Love"	2013	The Suspicious Housekeeper	
"Reset"	2014	Reset	
"Violet Fragrance"	2016	Pure Love	
"Dream"	2016	Hey Ghost, Let's Fight	
"Can't You Hear My Heart"	2017	The Emperor: Owner of the Mask	

== Theater ==
Year	Title	Role	Notes
2010	Man of Vendetta (파괴된 사나이)	Joo Hye-rin (주혜린)	
2010	Sin of a Family (우리 이웃의 범죄)	Jung Yu-nim (정유님)	Released in 2011
2011	Spy Papa	Soon-bok	
2011	2012	I Am the King	Sol-bi
2013	Killer Toon	Young Mi-seok	Cameo
2014	The Huntresses	Young Hong-dan	
2016	Pure Love	Soo-ok	Main role
2017	Your Name	Miyamizu Mitsuha	Voice (Korean dubbing)

== Accolades ==
=== Awards and nominations ===
Name of the award ceremony, year presented, category, nominee of the award, and the result of the nomination
Award ceremony	Year	Category	Nominee / Work	Result	Ref.
APAN Star Awards	2012	Best Young Actress	Missing You and Ma Boy	Won	
Baeksang Arts Awards	2021	Best Actress – Television	River Where the Moon Rises	Nominated	
Brand Customer Loyalty Awards	2020	Actress - Trend Icon	Kim So-hyun	Won	
Herald-Donga TV Lifestyle Awards	2013	Style Icon Rookie Award	Kim So-hyun	Won	
Instagram Awards in Korea	2018	Emerging Celebrity	Kim So-hyun	Won	
K-Food Content Indonesia	2018	Popularity Award (Actress)	Kim So-hyun	Won	
KBS Drama Awards	2014	Best Actress in a One-Act/Special/Short Drama	Drama Special: We All Cry Differently	Won	
KBS Drama Awards	2015	Best New Actress	Who Are You: School 2015	Won	
KBS Drama Awards	2015	Netizen Award, Actress	Who Are You: School 2015	Won	
KBS Drama Awards	2015	Best Couple Award	Kim So-hyun with Nam Joo-hyuk; Who Are You: School 2015	Nominated	
KBS Drama Awards	2015	Best Couple Award	Kim So-hyun with Yook Sung-jae; Who Are You: School 2015	Won	
KBS Drama Awards	2016	Best Actress in a One-Act/Special/Short Drama	Page Turner	Nominated	
KBS Drama Awards	2018	Best Couple Award	Kim So-hyun with Yoon Doo-joon; Radio Romance	Nominated	
KBS Drama Awards	2019	Excellence Award, Actress in a Miniseries	The Tale of Nokdu	Won	
KBS Drama Awards	2019	Netizen Award, Actress	The Tale of Nokdu	Nominated	
KBS Drama Awards	2019	Best Couple Award	Kim So-hyun with Jang Dong-yoon; The Tale of Nokdu	Won	
KBS Drama Awards	2021	Top Excellence Award, Actress	River Where the Moon Rises	Won	
KBS Drama Awards	2021	Grand Prize (Daesang)	River Where the Moon Rises	Nominated	
KBS Drama Awards	2021	Excellence Award, Actress in a Miniseries	River Where the Moon Rises	Nominated	
KBS Drama Awards	2021	Popularity Award, Actress	River Where the Moon Rises	Won	
KBS Drama Awards	2021	Best Couple Award	Kim So-hyun with Na In-woo; River Where the Moon Rises	Won	
Korea Best Dresser Swan Awards	2015	Rising Star Award	Kim So-hyun	Won	
Korea Broadcasting Awards	2021	Best Actress Award	River Where the Moon Rises	Won	
Korea Broadcasting Awards	2021	Popularity Award – Actor	River Where the Moon Rises	Won	
Korea Drama Awards	2012	Best Young Actress	Moon Embracing the Sun	Nominated	
Korea Drama Awards	2015	Star of the Year	Who Are You: School 2015	Won	
Korea Drama Awards	2025	Excellence Awards, Actress	Good Boy	Nominated	
Korea Hallyu Awards	2017	Popular Culture Award	The Emperor: Owner of the Mask	Won	
Korea Youth Film Festival	2013	Best Young Actress	Moon Embracing the Sun and Missing You	Won	
MBC Drama Awards	2012	Popularity Award	Moon Embracing the Sun	Nominated	
MBC Drama Awards	2012	Best Young Actress	Moon Embracing the Sun and Missing You	Won	
MBC Drama Awards	2017	Top Excellence Award, Actress in a Miniseries	The Emperor: Owner of the Mask	Nominated	
MBC Drama Awards	2017	Popularity Award, Actress	The Emperor: Owner of the Mask	Won	
MBC Entertainment Awards	2013	Best Female Newcomer in a Variety Show	Show! Music Core	Won	
MBC Entertainment Awards	2014	Most Popular Award in a Variety Show	Show! Music Core	Won	
MBC Entertainment Awards	2018	Excellence Award, Music/Talk Category (Female)	Under Nineteen	Won	
Multimedia & Film Technology Awards	2016	Shining Actress Award	Kim So-hyun	Won	
Pierson Movie Festival	2016	Trend Choice Best Actress	Kim So-hyun	Nominated	
SBS Drama Awards	2013	New Star Award	The Suspicious Housekeeper	Won	
Seoul International Drama Awards	2021	Outstanding Korean Actress	Love Alarm (Season 2)	Nominated	
Soompi Awards	2018	Best Couple Award	Kim So-hyun with Yoo Seung-ho; The Emperor: Owner of the Mask	Nominated	

=== Listicles ===
Name of publisher, year listed, name of listicle, and placement
Publisher	Year	Listicle	Placement	Ref.
Forbes	2020	100 Digital Stars (Asia)	Placed	
