= The Plan (2014 film) =

- Theatrical poster
- Hangul: 설계
- Hanja: 設計
- RR: Seolgye
- MR: Sŏlgye
- Directed by: Park Chang-jin
- Written by: Park Chang-jin
- Produced by: Choi Yoo-ri
- Starring: Shin Eun-kyung; Oh In-hye; Kang Ji-sub; Lee Ki-young
- Edited by: Jo In-hyeong
- Production company: Pop Entertainment
- Release date: September 18, 2014
- Running time: 98 minutes
- Country: South Korea
- Language: Korean

The Plan (Korean: 설계) is a 2014 South Korean thriller film directed by Park Chang-jin.

== Plot ==
Se-hee is a notoriously cold-blooded money-lender. In order to survive in the cruel business, she is not afraid to seduce a man, destroy a family, or take away collateral through underhanded means. By the time her name becomes known in the business, she has two men who are always by her side: financial sponsor In-ho, and adoring regular guy Yong-hoon.

One day, Se-hee comes across Min-young, a desperate but beautiful girl who reminds her of herself when she was young. Loan sharks had ruined Se-hee's family when she was a child, which made her decide to become one herself. Se-hee lures Min-young into her clan, and together they meticulously plan an act of revenge to take down the kingpin of the loan shark business.

== Cast ==
- Shin Eun-kyung as Se-hee
  - Han Ji-an as Se-hee (young)
- Oh In-hye as Min-young
- Kang Ji-sub as Yong-hoon
- Lee Ki-young as In-ho
- Choi Yong-min
