= Radio Romance (TV series) =

2018 South Korean television series

- Promotional poster
- Hangul: 라디오 로맨스
- RR: Radio romaenseu
- MR: Radio romaensŭ
- Genre: Romance
- Created by: KBS Drama Production
- Written by: Jeon Yu-ri
- Directed by: Kim Shin-il
- Starring: Yoon Doo-joon; Kim So-hyun; Yoon Park; Yura
- Country of origin: South Korea
- Original language: Korean
- No. of episodes: 16

Production
- Executive producers: Heo Gun; Kim Chu-seok; Kim Kwan-min; Lee Gun-joon
- Producers: Kim Dong-hwi; Seo Byung-chul
- Camera setup: Single-camera
- Running time: 60 minutes
- Production companies: Urban Works Media; Plusis Media

Original release
- Network: KBS2
- Release: January 29 – March 20, 2018

Radio Romance (Korean: 라디오 로맨스) is a 2018 South Korean television series starring Yoon Doo-joon and Kim So-hyun, with Yoon Park and Yura. It aired on KBS2 from January 29 to March 20, 2018, every Monday and Tuesday at 22:00 (KST). The series is human romance drama that tells the story of a scripted top star becoming a radio DJ who never goes according to the script.

== Synopsis ==
Song Geu-rim (Kim So-hyun) has always wanted to become a radio writer, but was forced to be an assistant writer as she lacks the writing skills. When her only show faces cancellation, she must secure her place as a writer and decides to try casting Ji Soo-ho (Yoon Doo-joon), a top star actor who is known to have a "perfect life".

== Cast ==
=== Main ===
- Yoon Doo-joon as Ji Soo-ho, a top actor who is accustomed to act based on scripts. He ends up becoming the DJ for a live radio show where nothing ever goes according to plan.
  - Nam Da-reum as young Ji Soo-ho
- Kim So-hyun as Song Geu-rim, the writer of Soo-ho's radio show with five years of experience as an assistant writer. She lacks writing skills but possesses excellent planning skills.
  - Lee Re as young Song Geu-rim
- Yoon Park as Lee Kang, the radio station's competent producing director. Because of his perfectionism, every program he handles achieved No. 1 in listener ratings.
- Yura as Jin Tae-ri, an over-the-hill actress who fell from grace due to a DUI accident that happened three years ago.

=== Supporting ===
==== People around Soo-ho and Geu-rim ====
- Ha Jun as Kim Jun-woo (33 years old), Soo-ho's long-time manager who watches over every move of him.
- Kwak Dong-yeon as Jason, a 28-year-old psychiatrist who is Soo-ho's high school classmate and personal doctor.
- Oh Hyun-kyung as Nam Joo-ha, Soo-ho's 51-year-old biological mother who serves as CEO of JH Entertainment.
- Kim Byung-se as Ji Yoon-seok, Soo-ho's 55-year-old father who is a veteran actor.
- Seo Ye-seul as Jung Da-seul, a popular 23-year-old actress who has an affair with Soo-ho's father.
- Kim Ye-ryeong as Jo Ae-ran (53 years old), Geu-rim's mother who became blind during a surgery she had when she was 39.

==== Radio station staff ====
- Kim Hye-eun as Ra Ra-hee, a 41-year-old radio program writer.
- Im Ji-kyu as Lee Seung-soo, a 43-year-old radio program director.
- Jo Byeong-kyu as Go Hoon-jung, a 30-year-old radio assistant director.
- Lee Won-jong as Kang Hee-seok, a 55-year-old radio station director.
- Yoon Joo-sang as Moon Seong-woo, a 57-year-old DJ of a thirty-year old radio program.

==== Radio station sub-writer members ====
- Ryu Hye-rin as "Tornado"
- Shim Eun-woo as "Gamoom"
- Jung Yoo-rim as "Jangma"

==== Others ====
- Jung Hee-tae as Ahn Bong-seob, a 37-year-old reporter.
- Choi Min-young as Woo Ji-woo, Soo-ho's friend who liked Geu-rim 12 years ago but died in a car accident.

=== Special appearances ===
- U-Kwon as Kang Minu (Ep. 1)
- Ji Il-joo as Oh Jin-soo (Ep. 2–3)
- Jung Gyu-soo as an amnesiac old man (Ep. 4)
- Bona as DJ Jay (Ep. 5)

== Production ==
Lead actors Yoon Doo-joon and Kim So-hyun first worked together in a 2014 advertisement. Yoon also made a cameo appearance in the 2016 TV series Bring It On, Ghost that starred Kim.

The series is a joint production of Urban Works Media (producer of the Bad Guys series) and Plusis Media (a subsidiary of the Sports Seoul-Seoul Shinmun group launched in 2017) for KBS. The first script-reading of the cast occurred on December 19, 2017, at KBS Annex Broadcasting Station in Yeouido, Seoul.

== Original soundtrack ==
Radio Romance OST

Soundtrack album by Various artists
- Genre: Soundtrack
- Language: Korean
- Labels: CREAHUB, LOEN Entertainment (Note: Relaunched and renamed as Kakao M on March 23, 2018)

=== Part 1 ===
No.	Title	Lyrics	Music	Artist	Length
1.	"Radio Romance"	Park Geun-chul; Runy; Jung Soo-min	Park Geun-chul; Runy; Jung Soo-min	Doyoung and Taeil of NCT U	3:39
2.	"Radio Romance (Inst.)"		Park Geun-chul; Runy; Jung Soo-min		3:39
Total length:					7:18

=== Part 2 ===
No.	Title	Lyrics	Music	Artist	Length
1.	"The Covered Up Road (Sound Track Ver.)" (가리워진 길)	Yoo Jae-ha	Yoo Jae-ha	Nakjoon	3:21
2.	"The Covered Up Road (Special Live Ver.)"	Yoo Jae-ha	Yoo Jae-ha	Nakjoon	3:23
3.	"The Covered Up Road (Sound Track Ver.) (Inst.)"		Yoo Jae-ha		3:21
4.	"The Covered Up Road (Special Live Ver.) (Inst.)"		Yoo Jae-ha		3:23
Total length:					13:28

=== Part 3 ===
No.	Title	Lyrics	Music	Artist	Length
1.	"Bygone Days" (지난 날)	Yoo Jae-ha	Yoo Jae-ha	Migyo	5:19
2.	"Bygone Days (Inst.)"		Yoo Jae-ha		5:19
Total length:					10:38

=== Part 4 ===
No.	Title	Lyrics	Music	Artist	Length
1.	"Another Sadness" (또 하나의 슬픔)	Lee Hyun-do	Lee Hyun-do	J_ust	4:01
2.	"Another Sadness (Inst.)"		Lee Hyun-do		4:01
Total length:					8:02

=== Part 5 ===
No.	Title	Lyrics	Music	Artist	Length
1.	"Story"	KamDongis; Seo Jae-ha; Kim Young-sung	KamDongis; Seo Jae-ha; Kim Young-sung	Lee Seok-hoon	3:44
2.	"Story (Inst.)"		KamDongis; Seo Jae-ha; Kim Young-sung		3:44
Total length:					7:28

=== Part 6 ===
No.	Title	Lyrics	Music	Artist	Length
1.	"On The Road" (길에서)	RUNY; Park Geun-cheol; Jung Soo-min	Park Geun-cheol; Jung Soo-min	Haebin (Gugudan)	3:59
2.	"On The Road (Inst.)"		Park Geun-cheol; Jung Soo-min		3:59
Total length:					7:58

Disc 2:
No.	Title	Artist	Length
1.	"Your Radio"	Various Artists	2:46
2.	"Bang Bang"	Various Artists	1:21
3.	"Cycling"	Various Artists	2:50
4.	"Happiness"	Various Artists	2:32
5.	"Lovely string"	Various Artists	5:02
6.	"My Home"	Various Artists	2:48
7.	"Starlight"	Various Artists	3:27
8.	"Someone"	Various Artists	4:04
9.	"Shake it, Shake it"	Various Artists	2:23
10.	"Our Shining days"	Various Artists	2:43
11.	"Start up"	Various Artists	4:08
12.	"Ssdam Ssdam"	Various Artists	2:21

== Controversy ==
On January 24, 2018, a photo was shared online saying that lead actress Kim So-hyun was shooting underwater. The photo shows a woman wearing a hanbok in the water on January 21. On that day, the lowest temperature was recorded below −16 °C (3 °F). During the press conference for the premiere of Radio Romance held on January 25, the drama's PD addressed online criticism regarding the outdoor water filming, despite the weather warnings. He issued an apology stating that "Kim So Hyun's outdoor water filming wrapped up on Sunday (January 21). We debated on it a lot, since she would be getting in the water. We ensured safety equipment nearby, as well as a camping car on set, and finished filming in the shortest amount of time possible. Due to time constraints, an action stunt double filmed additional outdoor water scenes yesterday (January 24). It was filmed by an action actor, not Kim So-hyun, wearing a winter suit and shot in a similar situation (January 21). The number of shots was done with one take and protection was taken right away. We apologize for causing concerns with this matter. The filming set is our life. Naturally, safety is important." At the press conference, Kim's hand was seen red.

== Ratings ==
Ep.	Original broadcast date	Average audience share			
Ep.	Original broadcast date	TNmS		Nielsen Korea	
Ep.	Original broadcast date	Nationwide	Seoul	Nationwide	Seoul
1	January 29, 2018	6.2% (NR)	6.3% (NR)	5.5% (NR)	5.6% (NR)
2	January 30, 2018	5.2% (NR)	5.4% (NR)	5.8% (NR)	6.0% (NR)
3	February 5, 2018	6.2% (NR)	6.4% (NR)	5.2% (NR)	5.3% (NR)
4	February 6, 2018	5.5% (NR)	5.8% (NR)	5.6% (NR)	5.9% (NR)
5	February 13, 2018 (Note: Two episodes are aired on the same day due to the 2018 Winter Olympics.)	6.5% (17th)	6.6% (NR)	5.1% (20th)	5.0% (20th)
6	February 13, 2018	5.5% (NR)	6.2% (NR)	4.2% (NR)	4.9% (NR)
7	February 20, 2018	4.8% (NR)	5.3% (NR)	3.9% (NR)	4.4% (NR)
8	February 20, 2018	4.6% (NR)	5.2% (NR)	3.4% (NR)	4.1% (NR)
9	February 26, 2018	5.1% (NR)	6.0% (NR)	3.7% (NR)	4.6% (NR)
10	February 27, 2018	4.7% (NR)	5.6% (NR)	3.4% (NR)	4.3% (NR)
11	March 5, 2018	4.4% (NR)	5.2% (NR)	4.0% (NR)	4.8% (NR)
12	March 6, 2018	4.6% (NR)	5.0% (NR)	3.5% (NR)	3.9% (NR)
13	March 12, 2018	4.1% (NR)	4.5% (NR)	2.9% (NR)	3.3% (NR)
14	March 13, 2018	4.1% (NR)	4.4% (NR)	2.9% (NR)	3.2% (NR)
15	March 19, 2018	4.1% (NR)	4.2% (NR)	2.6% (NR)	2.7% (NR)
16	March 20, 2018	4.2% (NR)	4.6% (NR)	3.1% (NR)	3.4% (NR)
Average		5.0%	5.4%	4.1%	4.5%
In the table above, the blue numbers represent the lowest ratings and the red numbers represent the highest ratings.; NR denotes that the drama did not rank in the top 20 daily programs on that date.

== Awards and nominations ==
Year	Award	Category	Recipient	Result	Ref.
2018	2018 KBS Drama Awards	Best Young Actor	Nam Da-reum	Won	
2018	2018 KBS Drama Awards	Best Young Actress	Lee Re	Nominated	
