= My Lovely Liar =

2023 South Korean television series

- Promotional poster
- Hangul: 소용없어 거짓말
- Lit.: Useless Lies
- RR: Soyongeopseo geojinmal
- MR: Soyongŏpsŏ kŏjinmal
- Genre: Mystery; Romantic comedy
- Developed by: Studio Dragon (planning)
- Written by: Seo Jeong-eun
- Directed by: Nam Sung-woo
- Starring: Kim So-hyun; Hwang Min-hyun
- Music by: Lim Ha-young
- Country of origin: South Korea
- Original language: Korean
- No. of episodes: 16

Production
- Executive producers: Lee Ki-hyuk (CP); So Jae-hyeon (CP)
- Producers: Ji Yong-ho; Park Gyu-won
- Running time: 60 minutes
- Production companies: Big Ocean ENM; Supermoon Pictures

Original release
- Network: tvN
- Release: July 31 – September 19, 2023

My Lovely Liar (Korean: 소용없어 거짓말) is a 2023 South Korean television series directed by Nam Sung-woo, starring Kim So-hyun and Hwang Min-hyun. It aired on tvN from July 31 to September 19, 2023, every Monday and Tuesday at 20:50 (KST) for 16 episode. It is also available for streaming on TVING in South Korea, on U-Next in Japan, and on Viki and Viu in selected regions.

== Synopsis ==
The series depicts the story of a woman who works as a private interrogator and can't trust people because of her ability to hear lies and uncovers the truth while getting entangled with a murder suspect whose innocence no one believes in.

== Cast and characters ==
=== Main ===
- Kim So-hyun as Mok Sol-hee: a person who gave up her everyday happiness when she was young due to her ability to recognize lies when she hears them in person. She is the owner of Tarot Cafe that also serves as a front for her interrogating business in detecting lies from people requested by clients
- Hwang Min-hyun as Kim Do-ha / Kim Seung-ju: a famous composer and producer in Korea who goes by the stage name "Kim Do-ha". He changed his name and went into hiding due to an incident in his past.
- Seo Ji-hoon as Lee Kang-min: a detective who was once engaged to Mok Sol-hee, who 3 years later after their breakup, transfers police stations in hopes of reconnecting.
- Lee Si-woo as Sya On/Sa Ji On: a top solo singer and the nation's younger sister.

=== Supporting ===
==== People at J Entertainment ====
- Yoon Ji-on as Jo Deuk-chan: CEO of J Entertainment who knows Do-ha's identity.
- Nam Hyun-woo as Jo Jae-chan: Deuk-chan's younger brother who is the planning director of J Entertainment.
- Song Jin-woo as Park Moo-jin: a director and composer of J Entertainment and Do-ha's rival.
- Baek Seung-do as Ethan: main vocalist of Atlantis.

==== People around Sol-hee ====
- Ha Jong-woo as Baek Chi-hoon: Sol-hee's bodyguard.
- Park Kyung-hye as Cassandra / Yoon Ye-seul: a superstitious tarot magician and barista.
- Jin Kyung as Cha Hyang-suk: Sol-hee's mother.
- Ahn Nae-sang as Mok Tae-seop: Sol-hee's father.

==== People around Do-ha ====
- Seo Jeong-yeon as Jung Yeon-mi: Do-ha's mother who is a member of the National Assembly.
- Kwon Dong-ho as Choi Eom-ho: Eom-ji's older brother.
- Seo Hyun-chul as Jang Jung-gyu: the owner and drummer of Oasis Live Jazz Bar.

==== People in Yeonseo-dong ====
- Cho Jin-se as So Bo-ro: owner of Yonso Bakery.
- Kim Won-hun as Oh O-baek: owner of Boo Boo, a craft beer house in an alley.
- Eom Ji-yoon as Hwang Cho-rok: owner of Chorok Salad.
- Bang Jae-ho as Lee Young-jae: a part-timer at a branch in Seoul.

=== Extended ===
- Baek Min-hyun as Oh Ki-ja: a veteran entertainment club who tries to reveal Do-ha's face.
- Song Ji-hyun as Choi Eom-ji: Do-ha's ex-girlfriend.

=== Special appearances ===
- Go Geon-han as CEO's son
- Kim Sun-young as Choi Ji-hye
- Han Ji-eun

== Production ==
=== Development ===
It is directed by Nam Sung-woo, who directed other works such as Kkondae Intern (2020) and My Roommate Is a Gumiho (2021).

=== Casting ===
On September 21, 2022, it was reported that Hwang Min-hyun and Kim So-hyun were in talks for the role of the male and female protagonists in the drama Useless Lies, and was later confirmed for the role in November.

=== Filming ===
Filming began in February 2023.

== Episodes ==
No.	Original release date
1	July 31, 2023
In the year 2018, Mok Sol-hee, a liar hunter and a fan of Manchester United, successfully finds out who passed the information to her client's rival gang. While heading to Gwanghwamun, she passes by a pedestrian (Kim Do-ha as will be later found out) who is holding a blood-stained jacket. The next day, she meets Do-ha on the bus but does not remember him and helps him ward off a man that claimed he was cheating on her girlfriend. Do-ha is surprised that she believed him he did not cheat and Sol-hee tells him that she can hear lies. Then, five years later, Sol-hee solves another case and now has its own café where she meets her clients, as well as a coworker Cassandra and a bodyguard Baek Chi-hoon. Do-ha is now a famous music writer constantly wearing a mask that only his closest co-workers have seen in person, including Sha On, who brings him the award he won. A reporter manages to take a picture of him and find his home, forcing him to move to another apartment. Coincidentally, there is another man wearing a black mask in the new neighbourhood harassing women at night. This leads to a misunderstanding and just as Do-ha is about to have his mask taken off, Sol-hee announces he is not the right person. Do-ha remembers her.
2	August 1, 2023
The real harasser is found. Do-ha is relieved and starts asking Sol-hee if she remembers him. For her to recognise him, she hints that he should take of his mask, but he does not and just leaves. He, however, now lives the next door to Sol-hee. Sol-hee's mother is a con artist, and Sol-hee constantly destroys her plans. Do-ha is also a pianist in a jazz club, where he does not wear a mask, but sunglasses. At night, Sol-hee watches a football match and also wakes up Do-ha. They both watch the same match, however they are fans of different clubs that play in the game. Their food gets delivered at the same time and only then they realize they are each other's neighbour. The next morning, Chi-hoon accidentally damages Do-ha's car while trying to take a picture with it, but Do-ha did not mind it that much. Deuk-chan, the CEO of J entertainment for which Do-ha works and a close friend of his admits to Moo-jin the rumour that Sha On is seeing Do-ha, which Moo-jin records and then blackmails him to send it to news media unless he can meet with Do-ha. Sol-hee sees Deuk-chan and Do-ha together in front of the complex and thinks that Deuk-chan is a creditor since they switched cars. Next day, Moo-jin comes to Sol-hee as a client so she would help him prove that Do-ha is a liar and plagiarises other songs. However, Do-ha only speaks the truth, which makes Moo-jin angry, forcing Do-ha to drink alcohol, and at the end, spraying a can of coke into his face. Sol-hee, however, did not see his face as she was hiding in a secret compartment. As Sol-hee comes home, she finds Do-ha drunk in front of the building. Because of the coke stains on his shirt she finds out he is Do-ha. She wants to help him, but her temptation to remove the mask wins over.
3	August 7, 2023
Do-ha wakes up as Sol-hee tries to put the mask back on and is initially very concerned, but later does not mind that much as she still does not remember him nor tells him that she knows he is Do-ha. Police officer Kang-min is transferred to the same neighbourhood. When Do-ha arrives at the apartment, Sol-hee sees him. Then, a strange man appears, asking Sol-hee to use her phone and give money for the cab. Sol-hee, knowing he speaks the truth, helps him while Do-ha thinks she is mindlessly helping anyone. On the stage, Sha On is hurt, but is later found out she did it on purpose. Chi-hoon finds out Sha On has snuck out of the hospital and is sitting beside him. Jae-chan, Deuk-chan's brother, finds out where Do-Ha's new apartment is and trades this information with Sha On in order for her to make an advertisement for a restaurant. Sol-hee's mother comes to Sol-hee's apartment hoping to get money, and Do-ha overhears everything. Do-ha also overhears that Sol-hee is going on a blind date, not knowing this is a date of one of her clients. During the date, Sol-hee reminds herself of a time when she used to date Kang-min, but they later broke up because he lied to her. After the date, she goes to the jazz club where Do-ha plays. She gets drunk and raises her voice when one of the former client's dates finds out she was not the relative she was claiming to be then. Do-ha steps in, but he forgets to put on his mask. They go to a restaurant as Sol-hee wanted to eat the hangover soup, however the waiter brings two soups, so she persuades Do-ha to take off his mask and eat in public. When they arrive home, they are met with a group of reporters that search for Do-ha in order to photograph him.
4	August 8, 2023
Sol-hee successfully manages to help Do-ha get into the complex without being photographed, however the reporters follow and Do-ha ends up being trapped in Sol-hee's apartment. He tells her his name is Kim Seung-ju, leading her to believe her power does not work on him as it seemed he was always telling the truth. Reporters photograph a delivery man thinking he was Do-ha which leads to a fight and police is called. Kang-min comes to the scene and coincidentally also sees Sol-hee, however he also notices Do-ha's shoes. Do-ha admits he does not want to work with Sha On anymore because of her obsession. Later, Sol-hee invites him to a dinner. Kang-min meets again with Sol-hee and asks about the shoes he saw. She lies that those were her boyfriend's. Do-ha, who happens to go by, comes closer as he did not know Kang-min and plays along. Sha On tries to follow Deuk-chan to find Do-ha who she was unable find to despite the additional information. Deuk-chan tells Sha On that Do-ha does not want to work with her anymore. Sol-hee and Do-ha have dinner together at the restaurant, but is cut short by Sha On's call claiming she will commit a suicide in a similar manner as Do-ha's first girlfriend was murdered / committed suicide (of which he was a murder suspect too). He gets a fever leading Sol-hee to drive him to Sha On. During the drive, he confesses he is Kim Do-ha and urges her not to take photos. Sha On is saved, but sees Sol-hee. When arriving back, Do-ha, who was half-asleep, says "I didn't kill her" and Sol-hee recognises that as a lie.
5	August 14, 2023
In the past, Do-ha firstly confessed to killing her girlfriend but then denied it. Sol-hee brings Do-ha the medicine for the fever, but he is already sleeping and starts holding her hand, forcing Sol-hee to sleep with him. Do-ha thinks she slept with him because he had told her the secret, so he turns his phone off. This leads to Do-ha being unable to play the piano and a new pianist is found at the jazz club. An impostor claiming he is Do-ha publishes a video telling J entertainment uses ghostwriters, but Do-ha is completely oblivious of that. Sol-hee manages to find Do-ha in the club and tells him about the impostor. Do-ha's mother wants to send him to Germany to help her career, leading to an argument. Do-ha recognizes who the impostor is and confronts him at his place. This leads to them both appearing in front of the J entertainment's board of directors. Do-ha admits he is indeed Do-ha, but does not take off his mask. Moo-jin, who used ghostwriters, embarrasses himself and is dismissed. Sha On apologizes to Do-ha. Do-ha is able to play the piano again.
6	August 15, 2023
Do-ha tries to break the habit of always wearing a mask, so he takes Sol-hee out for dinner. She ends up being drunk so he makes sure she arrives home safely and she notices the scar on his back. Sha On is depressed because Do-ha told her he does not love her. Do-ha brings Sol-hee the hangover soup and asks her to clean his shirt. Brother of the girl Do-ha presumably killed, Eom-ho, gets into Deuk-chan's car and asks him if Do-ha is actually Seung-ju. Deuk-chan denies it, but does not tell Do-ha about the incident. A neighbor finds out about the secret room in Sol-hee's café and tells Do-ha. Kang-min gets hurt during work. Sol-hee and Do-ha watch a match together. Sol-hee admits her mom is lying to one of her clients, which leads to her being outraged and making a mess in her café. Do-ha sees them and Sol-hee admits to him that she can hear lies.
7	August 21, 2023
Do-ha does not mind much about Sol-hee's power, but she still regrets telling him. He helps her clean the café and meets Chi-hoon, who thinks he is a fan of Sha On as well. Do-ha invites her to visit the neighboring bakery when a customer demands a refund after presumably finding a cockroach in the dough. They then head to a restaurant where they sit next to Kang-min, who finds out Do-ha is not Sol-hee's boyfriend. Do-ha goes back to the bakery, where he buys two platters of bread as another customer does not want it. In the evening, Do-ha and Sol-hee help the drunk owner of the bakery get home and decide to help him. Because of a customer at the café, they find out that a real-estate agency owner made the story up and the bakery owner then covers his whole family in flour. As a thank-you, he invites Do-ha and Sol-hee over along with other neighbors. Do-ha reveals his name, but no one takes him seriously. The next day, Sha On is looking for Do-ha again, but fans start taking pictures so Chi-hoon takes her to the café, where she starts offering Sol-hee money if she moves away. Sol-hee does not comply, leading Sha On to blurp out Do-ha killed someone in the past. Sol-hee asks Do-ha about it, and he lies that he did not kill anyone.
8	August 22, 2023
Deuk-chan is outraged that Sol-hee now knows Do-ha killed someone in the past while he trusts her and admits he likes her. Sol-hee accidentally reveals to Do-ha he searched the incident online and spills tea over his hand. Sol-hee asks him again if he killed someone and hears it as a lie again. Because of this, Do-ha becomes afraid to further talk about the incident. Sol-hee gets drunk, so he takes her home, but he moves back to the old apartment. Do-ha's mother persuades Deuk-chan to help her persuade Do-ha to study in Germany, but all of this is overheard by the brother of Do-ha's former deceased girlfriend, Eom-ho. When meeting another client at a hospital, she sees Kang-min going to gastric cancer center. She asks the doctors about him and finds out he has had gastritic cancer. After meeting with her client, she sees him again. He lies to her, saying he only visited someone and asks her out. Deuk-chan wants Sol-hee to sign a confidential agreement, but she does not want to be paid for signing it. Deuk-chan finally tells Do-ha about his encounter with Eom-ho, who stabbed Do-ha in the past, after he finds out Do-ha moved to his old apartment. At dinner, Sol-hee confesses to Kang-min she knows about his illness and finds out he was lying before the breakup because he did not want her to suffer. Sol-hee explains to him that she can hear lies, but nonetheless they do not start dating again. Sol-hee goes to visit Do-ha at his old apartment, but Eom-ho, dressed as a security guard, comes to her as she is talking to Do-ha on the phone. Do-ha recognizes his voice and rushes to save Sol-hee. They both end up in a dead end and just as Eom-ho is about to see them, another security guard finds out he is not the right guard. Sol-hee says she believes him.
9	August 28, 2023
Do-ha tells Sol-hee the story of her former girlfriend's death. They were together since high school, but Do-ha went to a university in Seoul. His girlfriend, Eom-ji, thought he is seeing someone else and started having suicidal thoughts. At the beach, she was screaming to him that she will commit suicide, but he though she was not serious and left her, according to his story although some scenes from previous episodes hint otherwise. Sol-hee concludes that the sentence was recognized as a lie because he blamed himself despite not physically killing her. He confesses they sat together on the bus, asks her to stay over and cooks dinner. The next day they go camping together, where they also kiss for the first time. Deuk-chan finds out his wife is seeing someone else. Kang-min finds out that Sol-hee's neighbour is the same person as the murder suspect from that case and starts to worry about her. Eom-ho kidnaps Sha On and uses her to blackmail Do-ha. They get into a fight where Do-ha confesses it is his fault, but also admits Eom-ho was partially responsible. Just as Eom-ho is about to stab him again, Kang-min appears and saves Do-ha.
10	August 29, 2023
Do-ha does not want Kang-min to arrest Eom-ho, hoping he has forgiven him after the talk. Sha On escapes and tells Deuk-chan about the accident. Do-ha wants to break ties with J entertainment for fear of hurting the company, should his secret be revealed. Do-ha and Sol-hee are now officially a couple, but Deuk-chan is not happy about it. Sol-hee and her two co-workers try to find Do-ha a bodyguard, but he refuses. Because of the injuries on his face, Do-ha starts wearing a mask again for a few days. Sol-hee agrees to join the festival Bo-ro is organizing, but her café stand does not get any customers, so Do-ha acts like a customer to attract them. Deuk-chan tells Do-ha's mother about Sol-hee so she also attends the festival and sees them together. Do-ha helps a singer win by playing the keyboard, but some girl remembers his face from somewhere else. The episode ends with a discovery of a body in the forest.
11	September 4, 2023
A ring is found by the body, but the detective hides it from other officers. Do-ha reveals to the Young-jae he is the famous songwriter, leading Young-jae to be obsessed with him, getting drunk and crashing at his apartment, but is later pick up by his brother, Ethan, who is also the lead singer of Atlantis, a group at J entertainment, and he also learns Do-ha's real identity. Do-ha's mother wins the primary elections and it is later confirmed that the body is Eom-ji. Kang-min suggests that Do-ha might have actually killed her, but does not remember since he was taking sedatives. Chi-hoon unintentionally meets with Sha On and suggests taking some time off, which she does, leading Deuk-Chan to announce J entertainment is not working with Do-ha anymore and to fire some groups, including Atlantis. Do-ha is called again for the interrogation because of the body, but it is performend by the same detective that hid the ring and is very brief. He was filmed at the festival and the video is going viral after the discovery of the body. Ethan asks Young-jae to get in touch with Do-ha but all of this is overheard by Moo-jin. Eom-ho finds Do-ha's address and wants to kill him, however he is not home so he waits. Later, someone comes to his doors and Eom-ho stabs him/her, however the face is not revealed. Sol-hee hears something is happening, but does not go outside.
12l	September 5, 2023
It is revealed that the person Eom-ho stabbed is Ethan, but he is still alive. Sol-hee calls the police and Kang-min arrives and arrests him. The story is published and Do-ha's secret is revealed. Ethan admits he was sent by Moo-jin to dig up some dirt on Do-ha. Do-ha also officially admits his secret and decides he will find the culprit so he goes to Hakcheon. He finds out Eom-ji was hiding her dad from him and now thinks her dad is the real murderer. Kang-min reads Eom-ho's notes on the case and decides he wants to help find the culprit. Do-ha's mother is struggling to keep her position and is paying for the detective's daughter medical treatment, provided he saves Do-ha from being the culprit. Sol-hee meets with Do-ha in Hakcheon and they find out Eom-ji's father got the insurance after the discovery of the body so they try to find him. Inadvertently, they find out Jae-chan is a gambling addict and was in love with Eom-ji.
13	September 11, 2023
Do-ha and Sol-hee find out Eom-ji's father did not kill her, but they start suspecting Jae-chan, who acts suspiciously as they try to confront him. Do-ha talks about his suspicion to Deuk-chan, which leads to a smaller argument. Kang-min finds out one of the police officers working on the case was bribed by Do-ha's mother, leading him to leak footage of her admitting it and gives the ring to Kang-min. Kang-min secretly meets with Do-ha, who tells him he suspects Jae-chan. Following the lead of the ring, Kang-min finds out it is not Do-Ha's as previously suspected. Sol-hee finds out someone is helping Jae-chan hide and they suspect Deuk-chan. Do-ha calls him and he denies, but lies. Due to the leak, Do-Ha's mother's reputation is ruined. Do-ha arranges a meeting with Deuk-chan so Sol-hee could hear if he lies, but finds out Jae-chan turned himself in.
14	September 12, 2023
Because of the incident, Jae-chan is transferred to Kang-min's station. Because the culprit is found, people in Yonso-dong throw Do-ha a party. Deuk-chan tells Do-ha he only found out his brother was the killer after the body was found and invites him to the company's provisional proclamation ceremony so they would show they made up. Kang-min finds out Jae-chan is lying and turned himself in because not enough incriminating evidence was found, so he asks Sol-hee to find out the truth. It turns out Jae-chan was covering for his brother and tells Sol-hee where the evidence is. During the ceremony, Deuk-chan announces he wants to step down from his position and wants Do-ha to take over, but he refuses. Meanwhile, Sol-hee sneaks into his office and finds the box with evidence, but also finds out he is in love with Do-ha. Deuk-chan tells Sol-hee the truth, but Do-ha also accidentally overhears. During the arrest, Deuk-chan escapes and purposefully gets into a car crash. As they try to help him, an explosion happens.
15	September 18, 2023
Deuk-chan is still alive, but is severely hurt. Do-ha comes and he apologises and tells how Eom-ji was killed by an accident. Then, he is arrested by Kang-min. Do-ha goes to the funeral, where he meets with Eom-ho. Eom-ho apologises and cries himself out. Sol-hee finds out she cannot hear lies anymore after the accident. Ethan is now a delivery guy and Sha On is finding another publisher. Do-ha tells her he won't join her as he has a plan of his own and keeps it a secret. Chi-hoon and Sha On exchange phone numbers and she asks him to work for her. Do-ha takes Sol-hee to a theater and cooks a dinner for her.
16	September 19, 2023
Sol-hee's mum is outraged to see Sol-hee's dad admitted on TV they got divorced because she had an affair. Do-ha invites Ethan over to show him the song he wrote for him. Kang-min and Sol-hee say goodbye to each other as they won't be seeing each other that often. Chi-hoon nervously tells Sol-hee he is quitting, but she congratulates him. Sol-hee's mother confesses to her she demanded her money because she thought she had been the reason for divorce. She also invites her to meet with her former husband, but Sol-hee is then angry at them because they argue. Do-ha's mother apologises to him and he tells her about Sol-hee. Sol-hee introduces her dad to Do-ha. All three devise a plan how Sol-hee's parents will get married again. Dad proposes, but mum says she does not want to get remarried with him. Miraculously, Sol-hee's power cames back and she recognises that as a lie. She steps in and mom reconsiders. Still, she does not want to continue with her old job. Ethan and Do-ha release an album and Do-ha is announced the best composer of 2024. When Do-ha visits Deuk-chan in a prison, he tells him about the heartwarming last message Eom-ji wanted to send. Sol-hee's parents open a restaurant where they sell spicy noodles. Do-ha proposes to Sol-hee and takes her to a football match.

== Reception ==
Pierce Conran of South China Morning Post gave the show a five star review, while praising the chemistry between the leads. He also added "the show plays around with people's expectations, and it's a cute fantasy drama." Joan MacDonald of Forbes praised the cast performance, saying: "Kim and Hwang make an appealing couple in the fun fantasy drama, while exploring what it means to be honest". Tatiana Hullender of Screen Rant opined that "Korean dramas have increasingly seen global success with dystopian and supernatural genres, such as in shows like Netflix's Squid Game and Hulu's Moving, romantic comedies have always been the bread and butter of the industry, and the show gleefully continues this tradition, albeit with the fantastical twist of protagonist Sol-hee's ability to hear lies". During its time of airing the show, quickly became Viki's most-watched program worldwide. Bhavna Agarwal of India Today gave the show a five star review while stating "The romance plot is organic and the chemistry between the leads is palpable, both So-hyun and Min-hyun share a visible comfort onscreen and their individual character arcs are also intriguing."

=== Viewership ===
My Lovely Liar : South Korea viewers per episode (thousands)

Season	Episode number																Average
Season	1	2	3	4	5	6	7	8	9	10	11	12	13	14	15	16	Average
1	618	718	681	666	714	799	731	635	594	677	479	653	600	641	766	737	669

Source: Audience measurement performed nationwide by Nielsen Korea.

Average TV viewership ratings
Ep.	Original broadcast date	Average audience share (Nielsen Korea)	
Ep.	Original broadcast date	Nationwide	Seoul
1	July 31, 2023	2.589% (2nd)	2.201% (2nd)
2	August 1, 2023	3.008% (3rd)	3.194% (3rd)
3	August 7, 2023	2.832% (2nd)	3.145% (2nd)
4	August 8, 2023	2.884% (3rd)	3.079% (3rd)
5	August 14, 2023	3.017% (2nd)	3.772% (2nd)
6	August 15, 2023	3.446% (2nd)	3.839% (2nd)
7	August 21, 2023	2.863% (2nd)	2.980% (2nd)
8	August 22, 2023	2.879% (2nd)	3.198% (2nd)
9	August 28, 2023	2.351% (2nd)	2.431% (2nd)
10	August 29, 2023	2.832% (1st)	2.939% (3rd)
11	September 4, 2023	2.355% (3rd)	2.292% (3rd)
12	September 5, 2023	3.194% (2nd)	3.623% (3rd)
13	September 11, 2023	2.958% (1st)	3.093% (2nd)
14	September 12, 2023	2.889% (3rd)	2.922% (4th)
15	September 18, 2023	3.406% (1st)	3.860% (1st)
16	September 19, 2023	3.440% (1st)	3.405% (2nd)
Average		2.928%	3.123%
In the table above, the blue numbers represent the lowest ratings and the red numbers represent the highest ratings.; This series aired on a cable channel/pay TV which normally has a relatively smaller audience compared to free-to-air TV/public broadcasters (KBS, SBS, MBC and EBS).

== Remake ==
Viu, which previously released the series as Viu Originals within their markets, announced the series were set to be remake for their linear TV network ViuTV.
