= Han Changhoon =

South Korean author (born 1963)

- Born: 1963 (age 62–63)
- Citizenship: South Korean
- Education: Hannam University
- Writing career
- Language: Korean

Korean name
- Hangul: 한창훈
- RR: Han Changhun
- MR: Han Ch'anghun

Han Changhoon is a South Korean author.

== Life ==
Han Changhoon was born in 1963 in the seaport town of Yeosu, and graduated from Hannam University with a degree in Regional Development. He made his literary debut in 1992 with 'An Anchor' which was published in Daejeon Daily Newspaper.

== Awards ==
- 3rd Hankyoreh Literature Prize, 1998 (for his novel Mussels)

== Works in Korean (partial) ==
Novels

- Mussels (홍합). Seoul: Hankyoreh Publishing, 1998. OCLC 40514015.
- Island, I Live the End of the World (섬, 나는 세상 끝을 산다). Seoul;: Changbi Publishers, 2003. OCLC 51842553.

Short story collections

- The Reason For Ocean’s Beauty (바다가 아름다운 이유). Seoul: Sol, 1996. OCLC 35171653.
- Looking at a Passing Bird (가던새본다). Seoul: Changbi Publishers, 1998. OCLC 40252114.
- The Person Who Went to the End of the Earth (세상의 끝으로 간 사람). Seoul: Munhak Tongne, 2001. OCLC 50316272.
