= Because This is My First Twenty =

2018 South Korean variety show

- Promotional poster
- Genre: Travel Show
- Starring: Kim So-hyun
- Original language: Korean
- No. of episodes: 12

Original release
- Release: September 28 – November 13, 2018

Kim So-hyun travels to the United States alone for the first time through the Lifetime channel entertainment program Because This Is My First Twenty.

== Format ==
This program features Kim So-hyun's journey as a TV personality, a global star, a 10-year-old actress, and a 20-year-old woman to find her own identity. Filming began in August 2018. A press conference was held at Four Seasons Hotel in Seoul on September 28, 2018.

== Episodes ==
No.	Title	Original release date
1	"Because It's My First Solo Trip to the US" (Korean: 나홀로 미국여행은 처음이라)	September 28, 2018
At the beginning, Kim So Hyun struggled packing for her first trip to the United States. She brought a skipping rope that didn't need for a trip, lactic acid medicine, and acupressure massage tools. In addition, she brings along her scrapbook that contains various information for the trip and check her bucket list in the car. Episode quote: I won't eat a lot but I'll taste everything.
2	"My First Time Meeting Someone with 1,000 outfits" (Korean: 김소현이 옷 1,000벌 가진 패피 만난 건 처음이라)	October 5, 2018
Kim revealed that she usually wears comfortable clothes; tracksuits. So, Kim made a surprise encounter with world-famous fashion influencer, Aimee Song to receive fashion tips from her and recommends the perfect style for Kim. As soon as they meet Kim So-hyun and Aimee Song, showed their heartwarming chemistry by continuing the relay of praise and letting Kim try. Kim was surprised to see Aimee Song's closet reminiscent of a department store with many fashion items and costumes. Guests: Aimee Song
3	"Because This Is My First Fashion Haul for XXX 10,000 Won" (Korean: 김소현에게 XXX만원짜리 패션하울은 처음이라)	October 12, 2018
Aimee Song guides Kim So-hyun to a Mexican restaurant. Kim showed her unique charm from mukbang to shopping at a famous vintage shop in Beverly Hills, Los Angeles, to showcase a unique fashion that maximise the charm of a 20 years old Kim So-hyun. The meeting between Aimee Song and Kim So Hyun has been publicized on Instagram Live before broadcasting to show Kim's styling transformation. Guests: Aimee Song
4	"Because This Is My First Time Being In A Hollywood Movie" (Korean: 김소현의 해리포터 기숙사 방배정은 처음이라)	October 16, 2018
Kim So-hyun explores Warner Bros. Studios with curiosity as a 20s actor and constantly asking questions to the guide. She visited DC Universe: The Exhibit, Harry Potter, and Fantastic Beasts, Stage 48 In particular, she, as a fan who announced her enthusiasm for the Harry Potter series, showing a special affection for Harry Potter, such as wearing her own Harry potter school uniform and challenging special shoots.
5	"Because It Is The First Dog with More Followers Than Me" (Korean: 김소현보다 팔로워 많은 강아지는 처음이라)	October 19, 2018
Kim So-hyun visited Instagram Headquarters in Los Angeles and having a good time meeting with Jiffpom, a World SNS star dog who has eight million followers. Guests: Jiffpom
6	"Because This Is My First Time Having A Greater Dream" (Korean: 김소현이 헐리우드에 간 건 처음이라)	October 23, 2018
Kim So-hyun visited the place where the Academy Awards ceremony is held and leave a surprise video letter to national actors Lee Byung Hun and Ahn Sung Ki. The 20-year-old Kim So-hyun, who visited Hollywood at the Holy Land of the film revealed her aspirations as an actor. She also shows the foreign fan who she met by chance with fluent English and fan service. Episode quote: "You can enjoy more if you know more about movies. Each stone, wall painting and poster had a special meaning from a movie. If you know the movie well or if you've watched it, you'd be able to enjoy much more."
7	"Because This Is My First Once In A Lifetime Photo" (Korean: 김소현이 미국 탑 인싸에게 셀카 강의 듣는 건 처음이라)	October 26, 2018
Kim So-hyun demonstrates her reverse self ability by attempting a self show at a street art on Melrose Avenue where American fashion people gather. She visited a company of fashion world famous boss, Chriselle Lim and photographers from Insa and they gave honey tips for life. Guests: Chriselle Lim
8	"Because Its My First Time Finding A Flower in the Desert" (Korean: 김소현이 사막에서 아이스크림 먹방은 처음이라)	October 30, 2018
Kim So-hyun arrived at a famous hand made burger in the American West since 1952. Then, she went to Joshua Tree National Park, Salvation Mountain, the Mojave Desert and Seven Magic Mountains. Episode quote: "You learn as you try" "Flowers bloom even in a desert." (She refers this to the Salvation Mountain as the flower in the desert.)
9	"Because Its My First Time Looking At The Stars In A Desert" (Korean: 김소현이 사막에서 혼자 캠핑하긴 처음이라)	November 2, 2018
Kim also challenged her first camping under the stars for her bucket list. She also showed her cooking skills by roasting the meat alone with confidence and even tried doing the "Salt Bae" way of sprinkling salt on to the meat. She then revealed her struggles in her acting career and living as an actress. Episode quote: "When you are acting or living as an actress, there is nothing tangible that you can grab. You are not doing it to hold onto something, but for that intangible something that you cannot hold, you have to continue walking and go through the process of going forward." "It is hard for someone doing it for the first time, but after trying it once, you wonder why you were so scared, and realise it is not as bad as you thought. And you can also discover a new side of yourself and learn about what you cannot do and what you are good at. So, when you are twenty, you should try once, do not think it matters if it is close or far."
10	"Because It Is The First Beach Shing Like A Jewel" (Korean: 김소현이 해변에서 치즈폭발 햄버거 먹방은 처음이라)	November 6, 2018
Kim So-Hyun went strolling at the Venice Beach and learn how to ride an electronic scooter for the first time.
11	"Because It Is My First Splendid Night Out" (Korean: 김소현이 라스베가스에서 초호화 호텔 투어는 처음이라)	November 9, 2018
Fulfilling Kim So-hyun's bucket list, she went on a Las Vegas limousine tour to the Welcome to Fabulous Las Vegas sign and visits to various hotels such as the Luxor Hotel and Paris Hotel.
12	"Because It Is My First Time Flying" (Korean: 김소현에게도 스무 살은, 처음이자 마지막이라)	November 13, 2018
Kim So-hyun visits Fremont Street, one of the top three major night view attractions of Las Vegas. Kim then challenged herself to the Las Vegas specialty zip-line. At the ending of the episode, Kim shared a video letter to friends who are about to become twenty years old. Kim So Hyun, who was worried about her first solo appearance in her debut 10 years, shares her impression that she discovered the 'twenty years old Kim Sohyun', which she did not know through her travels. Episode quote: "Rather than fearing, take action. You can still take away something from the process even if you fail. Through that process, you will become more mature and through such process, you become happy." "It's okay to challenge yourself without fear because this is the first time in 20s."
