= Sin of a Family =

- Hangul: 우리 이웃의 범죄
- Hanja: 우리 이웃의 犯罪
- RR: Uri iusui beomjoe
- MR: Uri iusŭi pŏmjoe
- Directed by: Min Byung-jin
- Written by: Jo Chang-ho
- Produced by: Min Byung-jin; Shin Hyun-joon; Lee Jang-seo; Jung Yun-wook; Kim Sam-jin
- Starring: Shin Hyun-joon; Lee Ki-woo
- Cinematography: Ji Kil-woong
- Edited by: Lee Do-hyeon
- Music by: Song Jun-seok
- Release date: 7 April 2011
- Running time: 119 minutes
- Country: South Korea
- Language: Korean

Sin of a Family (Korean: 우리 이웃의 범죄) is a 2011 South Korean crime film, produced by Shin Hyun-joon, about a detective who investigates the circumstances of a young autistic boy's death.

== Plot ==
A body found at a lake is identified by police as Jeong Min-hwan, a young autistic boy, who went missing two months earlier.

While struggling in his troubled relationship with his son Gyeong-su, Detective Jo Chang-shik is assigned to the case. As part of the investigation, he visits the victim's family.

When he eventually unearths their family secrets, he suspects the father may be responsible for Min-hwan's death.

== Cast ==
- Shin Hyun-joon as Jo Chang-shik
- Jeon No-min as Jeong In-su, the father
- Wang Heui-ji as Go Yeong-suk, the mother
- Lee Ki-woo as Detective Lee
- Jeong Weon-jung as Seo, section head
- Jo Sang-yeon as Jeong Myeong-hwan, the younger son
- Kim So-hyun as Jeong Myeong-heui, the daughter
- Park Chang-ik as Jeong Myeong-cheol, the elder son
- Oh In-hye as Goh Keum-sook, Yeong-suk's younger sister
- Kim Yong-woo as Detective Kim
- Lee Jae-wook as Detective Mun
- Kim Young-woong as Detective Park
- Noh Young-hak as Jo Gyeong-su, Chang-shik's son
- Choi Jong-hun as young man in neighbourhood

== Release ==
Sin of a Family was premiered at the 2010 Puchon Fantastic Film Festival.
