= Oh In-hye =

South Korean actress and model (1984–2020)

- Oh in 2010s
- Born: 4 January 1984; Seoul, South Korea
- Died: 14 September 2020 (aged 36); Songdo International Business District, Yeonsu, Incheon
- Occupations: Actress; model
- Years active: 2011–2020
- Agent: Red Line Entertainment
- Height: 5 ft 6.4 in (169 cm)

Oh In-hye (Korean: 오인혜; 4 January 1984 – 14 September 2020) was a South Korean actress and model.

== Career ==
Oh started her acting career in 2011 starring in the film Sin of a Family. The same year, she gained public attention during the 16th Busan International Film Festival, due to her wearing a revealing orange dress. In 2012, she was cast in a film Marrying the Mafia V, but this fell through. In July 2019, she launched a YouTube channel.

== Death ==
On 14 September 2020, Oh was found unconscious at her home in Songdo International Business District, Yeonsu, Incheon. She was immediately taken to a nearby hospital but died of cardiac arrest due to suicide. She was 36.

== Filmography ==
=== Film ===
Year	Title	Role
2011	Sin of a Family	Goh Keum-sook
2011	Red Vacance Black Wedding	Suji
2011	A Journey with Korean Masters	Illusion
2011	Eating Talking Faucking	In-hwee/therapist/Yoko/restauran madam/Bacchus-F woman
2013	Wish Taxi	Cho-hui
2013	No Breathing	High school female coach
2014	Janus: Two Faces of Desire	Da-hui
2014	The Plan	Min-young

=== Television series ===
Year	Title	Role
2012	KBS Drama Special: "Return Home"	Keum-ok
2012	The King's Doctor	Chung Mal-keum
2018	Yeonnam-dong 539	Chung Joo-eun
