= Ma Boy (TV series) =

South Korean television series

- Promotional poster
- Written by: Moon Seon-hee
- Directed by: Lee Jeong-min
- Starring: Kim So-hyun; Kim Sun-woong
- Country of origin: South Korea
- Original language: Korean
- No. of episodes: 3

Production
- Production location: Korea
- Running time: Thursday 21:00
- Production companies: CJ E&M Pictures; Penta E&C

Original release
- Network: Tooniverse
- Release: 16 August – 30 August 2012

Ma Boy (Korean: 마보이; RR: Maboi) is a 2012 South Korean drama starring Kim So-hyun and Kim Sun-woong in the first teen drama aired by Tooniverse. The drama was produced by CJ E&M Pictures and Penta E&C. The OST of the mini series was recorded by girl group Chi Chi. Ma Boy was streamed online on YouTube.

== Plot ==
Jang Geu-rim dreams about becoming a singer and transfers to an elite musical high school where her favorite K-pop idol, Tae-joon also studies. She gets entangled in secrets when she becomes the roommate of Irene, the most admired girl in the school – who turns out to be a boy in disguise.

== Cast ==
Main cast:

- Kim So-hyun as Jang Geu-rim
- Kim Sun-woong as Irene/Hyun Woo
- Min Hoo (민후) as Tae-joon
- Kim Ha-yeon (김하연) as Ji-soo
- Kang Hyun-joong (강현중) as Lee Eok-man
- Park Hee-gon (박희곤) as Hoon-nam
