= Page Turner (TV series) =

2016 South Korean television series

- Promotional poster
- Genre: Musical
- Written by: Heo Yoon-sook; Park Hye-ryun
- Directed by: Lee Jae-hoon
- Starring: Kim So-hyun; Ji Soo; Shin Jae-ha
- Country of origin: South Korea
- Original language: Korean
- No. of episodes: 3

Production
- Executive producer: Hong Suk-goo
- Producer: Moon Joon-ha
- Production companies: KBS and IHQ

Original release
- Network: KBS2
- Release: March 26 – April 9, 2016

Page Turner (Korean: 페이지 터너) is a three-episode drama special by KBS2 starring Kim So-hyun, Ji Soo and Shin Jae-ha which aired in 2016.

The drama was well-received in Korea. The number of video previews released in web and mobile was reported to have surpassed 600,000, an unusual figure for a one-play act. Moreover, it was praised for its well-written plot and aptly depicted emotions of teenage years. It is the first drama to be aired on Pooq.

== Synopsis ==
Story of a piano prodigy Yoon Yoo-seul who goes blind after a car accident, and struggles to get her life back on track with the help of Jung Cha-sik, a fellow aspiring pianist and Seo Jin-mok, her former rival who later becomes a supporter.

== Cast ==
=== Main cast ===
- Kim So-hyun as Yoon Yoo-seul
  - Lee Do-yeon as young Yoon Yoo-seul
- Ji Soo as Jung Cha-sik
- Shin Jae-ha as Seo Jin-mok
  - Jo Yong-jin as young Seo Jin-mok

=== Supporting cast ===
- Ye Ji-won as Yoon Yoo-seul's mother
- Hwang Young-hee as Jung Mi-soo (Jung Cha-sik's mother)
- Kim Min-sang as Seo Jin-mok's father
- Kim Dong-hee as Choi Sang-pil
- Yoo Yeon-mi as Lee Kyu-sun
- Han Sung-sik as High school teacher
- Chae Min-hee as High school teacher
- Seo Jin-wook
- Kim Min-chae
- Chun Ye-won
- Hwang Min-hyuk
- Im Ho as Yoon Yoo-seul's doctor
- Ahn Jae-mo as Jung Cha-sik's doctor

=== Special appearances ===
- Oh Kwang-rok as Street vendor
- Park Jong-hoon as Han Myung-se

== Ratings ==
In the table below, the blue numbers represent the lowest ratings and the red numbers represent the highest ratings.

Episode #	Original broadcast date	Average audience share (nationwide)	
Episode #	Original broadcast date	TNmS	AGB Nielsen
1	March 26, 2016	3.9%	4.0%
2	April 2, 2016	4.0%	4.6%
3	April 9, 2016	4.1%	4.8%
Average		3.983%	4.873%

== Awards and nominations ==
Year	Award	Category	Recipient	Result
2016	30th KBS Drama Awards	Excellence Award, Actor in a One-Act/Special/Short Drama	Ji Soo	Nominated
2016	30th KBS Drama Awards	Excellence Award, Actress in a One-Act/Special/Short Drama	Kim So-hyun	Nominated
2016	30th KBS Drama Awards	Best New Actor	Ji Soo	Nominated
