= Reset (South Korean TV series) =

- Promotional poster
- Genre: Crime drama Mystery; Thriller
- Written by: Kim Yong-kyun; Kim Pyung-joong
- Directed by: Jang Hyuk-rin
- Starring: Chun Jung-myung; Kim So-hyun
- Country of origin: South Korea
- Original language: Korean
- No. of episodes: 10

Production
- Producer: Han Ji-sung
- Running time: 60 minutes
- Production company: MiiN Pictures

Original release
- Network: OCN
- Release: August 24 – October 26, 2014

Reset (Korean: 리셋) is a 2014 South Korean television series starring Chun Jung-myung and Kim So-hyun. It aired on OCN from August 24 to October 26, 2014 on Sundays at 23:00 for 10 episodes.

== Plot ==
Cha Woo-jin's first love, Seung-hee, was murdered 15 years ago. Obsessed with finding her killer, Woo-jin became a prosecutor and has since devoted his career to putting violent criminals behind bars. With ten days left before the statute of limitations on Seung-hee's case runs out, Woo-jin meets a 17-year-old high school girl named Jo Eun-bi who looks exactly like Seung-hee. Their meeting catalyzes a chain of events that leads Woo-jin closer to uncovering the truth about the original crime, but Eun bi's involvement in the investigation makes her the killer's new target.

== Cast ==
- Chun Jung-myung as Cha Woo-jin
- Kim So-hyun as Jo Eun-bi / Choi Seung-hee
- Park Won-sang as Investigator Go
- Shin Eun-jung as Section chief Han
- Song Ha-yoon as Choi Yoon-hee
- Kim Hak-chul as GK Group chairman Kim
- Choi Jae-woong as Prosecutor Kim Dong-soo
- Jung Kyu-soo as Chief prosecutor
- Choi Soo-han as young Cha Woo-jin
- Choi Hyo-eun as Miss Jang
- Yeom Ji-young as Journalist Lee Young-na
- Kim Min-jae as Detective Park
- Lee Yeon as Chairman Kim's secretary
- Yoon Park as Kim In-seok
- Yang Hak-jin as One of the men in the CCTV room
- Shin Cheol-jin as Mr.Oh
- Kim Jin-yi as Han Mi-seon
- Kim Young-jae as Psychiatrist
- Song Tae-yoon
- Kang Ki-young as Section Chief

== Ratings ==
Episode	Original airdate	AGB Nielsen ratings
Episode	Original airdate	Average rating
1	August 24, 2014	1.27%
2	August 31, 2014	0.90%
3	September 7, 2014	0.65%
4	September 14, 2014	0.78%
5	September 21, 2014	0.61%
6	September 28, 2014	0.68%
7	October 5, 2014	0.71%
8	October 12, 2014	0.61%
9	October 19, 2014	0.55%
10	October 26, 2014	0.84%

Note: This drama airs on cable channel / pay TV which has a relatively small audience compared to free-to-air TV / public broadcasters (KBS, MBC, SBS, and EBS).
