= Doctor Shin =

2026 South Korean television series

- Promotional poster
- Hangul: 닥터신
- RR: Dakteo Sin
- MR: Takt'ŏ Sin
- Genre: Medical drama; Melodrama; Thriller
- Written by: Phoebe
- Directed by: Lee Seung-hoon
- Starring: Jung E-chan; Baek Seo-ra; Ahn Woo-yeon; Joo Se-bin; Cheon Young-min; Song Ji-in; Jeon No-min; Ji Young-san
- Opening theme: "Remember (Inst.)" by Hajin
- Country of origin: South Korea
- Original language: Korean
- No. of episodes: 16

Production
- Producers: Song In-seong; Ahn Seok-jun; Jeong Hoe-seok; Hong Seung-cheol; Park Chae-won
- Production companies: Syn&Studio; TME Group

Original release
- Network: TV Chosun
- Release: March 14 – May 3, 2026

Doctor Shin (Korean: 닥터신) is a 2026 South Korean medical melodrama thriller television series written by Phoebe, directed by Lee Seung-hoon, and starring Jung E-chan in the title role, along with Baek Seo-ra, Ahn Woo-yeon, Joo Se-bin, Cheon Young-min, Song Ji-in, Jeon No-min, and Ji Young-san. The series tells the story of a genius neurosurgeon, Doctor Shin, who dares to defy the boundaries of life and death, and a woman, whose soul is lost after a brain injury leaves her in a coma. It aired on TV Chosun from March 14, to May 3, 2026, every Saturday and Sunday at 22:30 (KST). It is also available for streaming on Coupang Play.

In contrast to the writer's previous commercial successes, the series was both a critical and commercial failure. Critics and audiences criticized it for its unclear storyline, brain-switching premise, and the performances of the cast, particularly actor Jung E-chan. The series marks Baek Seo-ra's acting debut. As a newcomer, she garnered notice for her "one person, four roles" performance, playing four different characters inhabiting the single body of "Momo".

== Synopsis ==
Shin Ju-shin is a genius neurosurgeon and the accomplished director of a neurosurgery hospital. He is preparing to marry his fiancée, the top actress Momo. However, tragedy strikes when a sudden accident leaves her body entirely intact but fatally brain-damaged, plunging her into an irreversible coma. Devastated by losing the woman he loves, Ju-shin decides to challenge the realm of the divine and ventures into forbidden medical territory. In a desperate, final attempt to save her, he performs an unprecedented and experimental "brain change / brain swap" transplant surgery, effectively transferring another soul and consciousness into Momo's body. As Momo finally awakens, Ju-shin must face a heartbreaking truth, the spirit residing in her body is no longer the woman he cherished. This forbidden choice unravels into an unforeseen, chaotic chain of events. As the medical thriller progresses, multiple characters end up swapping bodies and consciousnesses.

== Cast ==
=== Main ===
- Jung E-chan as Shin Ju-shin

A genius brain surgery expert, he is the director of the neurosurgery department at Nua Hospital and the chairman of the Nua Foundation. He is a brain surgeon who inherited his father Dr. Shin Woo-pil's exceptional skill. After losing his love Momo, his obsessive love for her led him to attempt a dangerous procedure to revive her body through a brain swap. He is a character who acts on his desires, prioritizing control over emotions and disregarding others' feelings.

- Baek Seo-ra as Momo

A top actress, engaged to Doctor Shin, suffers a catastrophic scuba diving accident in the ocean, loses consciousness, and her condition becomes critical. It severely damages her brain, leaving her in a coma, although her body is unharmed. Following a brain transplant performed by her fiancé, Momo’s soul is transferred into her mother's body, where she ultimately loses her sanity and passes away. Meanwhile, her own body becomes possessed by a succession of other characters' souls seeking to fulfill their own desires.

- Ahn Woo-yeon as Ha Yong-joong

A successful game developer, who is Ju-shin's close friend, has a crush on Momo.

- Joo Se-bin as Geum Ba-ra

Comes from the Nua orphanage, she is the youngest journalist in Seongwoo Ilbo's culture department. She has feelings for Yong-joong, who protected her and called her "baby" during their childhood. She is Momo's half sister.

- Cheon Young-min as Kim Jin-ju

Momo's stylist at Jaeim Company, who also came from the Nua orphanage.

- Song Ji-in as Hyun Ran-hee

Momo's mother, who is a gallery owner.

- Jeon No-min as James

Yong-joong's older brother, whose real name is Ha Jae-im, lives in his late father's body after a successful brain swap. He is a top stylist and CEO of Jaeim Company.

- Ji Young-san as Paul Kim

A western painter. He is searching for his biological daughter with Hyun Ran-hee, with whom he has a complicated relationship from high school. In Germany, he was in a traffic accident and had surgery that altered his face, which is why Hyun Ran-hee didn't recognize him when they reunited.

=== Supporting ===
- Cha Gwang-su as Kim Gwang-cheol

Jin-ju's biological father.

- Cha Ji-hyuk as Ji An-hee

A former soldier who was a childhood friend of Yong-joong and Ba-ra. He was killed by an unknown suspect in episode 2.

- Kang Na-eon as Tae Ye-jeong

Daughter of an attorney and the high school "queen bee" who bullied Ba-ra and Jin-ju. In episode 4, she was found dead in her family's vacation home.

== Episodes ==
| No. | Original release date |
|---|---|
| 1 | March 14, 2026 |
Captivated by Momo's performance in A Maiden's Prayer, neurosurgeon Shin Ju-shin arranges an introduction through stylist James. Despite Momo's initial coldness and rejection of his after-date plans, a connection forms.
| 2 | March 15, 2026 |
Shin abruptly proposes to Momo. Overcoming initial opposition from her mother, Hyun Ran-hee, the couple secures her consent to get engaged before marriage. Later, a catastrophic scuba diving accident leaves Momo comatose and brain-dead, though her physical body remains unharmed.
| 3 | March 21, 2026 |
Driven by obsession, Ju-shin performs an experimental brain transplant, placing Ran-hee’s brain into Momo’s body. While Ran-hee easily adapts to Momo's physical frame, Momo's soul—now trapped in Ran-hee's aging body—struggles with severe physical limitations.
| 4 | March 22, 2026 |
Ran-hee (in Momo's body) clears her name with emergency responders. Meanwhile, the immense physical strain causes Momo (in Ran-hee's body) to pass away. Ju-shin arrives to find an ambulance, devastated by the news of Ran-hee's death, unaware it was actually Momo's consciousness.
| 5 | March 28, 2026 |
Painter Paul Kim hires a private detective agency to track down his estranged biological daughter with Ran-hee. He arranges a tense face-to-face meeting with stylist Kim Jin-ju to verify their genetic relationship.
| 6 | March 29, 2026 |
Following conflicts with Ran-hee (in Momo's body), Ju-shin seeks a new partner. Discovering her father's criminal history, a desperate Jin-ju accepts Ju-shin’s dangerous proposal to undergo a brain swap, aiming to permanently usurp Momo's identity and life.
| 7 | April 4, 2026 |
The second brain transplant successfully places Jin-ju's mind into Momo's body. Ju-shin warns her that Jin-ju's identity is officially erased. While Jin-ju indulges in Momo's wealth, Ju-shin unexpectedly shifts his romantic interests toward journalist Geum Ba-ra.
| 8 | April 5, 2026 |
Jin-ju (in Momo's body) discovers she is pregnant but rejects the fetus as not truly hers. To spite Ba-ra, whose feelings she envies, Jin-ju deliberately seduces Ba-ra's close childhood friend, game developer Ha Yong-joong.
| 9 | April 11, 2026 |
Knowing Geum Ba-ra harbors unspoken feelings for Yong-joong, Jin-ju accelerates her seduction as revenge. After dissolving her engagement with Ju-shin, Jin-ju begs Yong-joong and Ba-ra to help her escape the control of the neurosurgeon.
| 10 | April 12, 2026 |
Shin proposes marriage to Ba-ra but is firmly rejected. Meanwhile, James demands Ba-ra intervene to stop Yong-joong's relationship with the pregnant Momo (Jin-ju). During a night out, Jin-ju is struck by a violent, unexplainable headache.
| 11 | April 18, 2026 |
Tensions peak when Yong-joong confronts Ju-shin at Ba-ra's house. After a night of drinking, Yong-joong and Ba-ra impulsively confess their love. Caught in a web of jealousy and Jin-ju's plotting, Ba-ra abruptly decides to flee Korea.
| 12 | April 19, 2026 |
Regretful over their sudden encounter, Ba-ra breaks up with Yong-joong and agrees to marry Ju-shin for stability. Ju-shin shelters Ba-ra in his home to isolate her from Yong-joong, resulting in a complex network of rearranged marriages.
| 13 | April 25, 2026 |
Ba-ra uncovers the horrifying truth of the hospital's illegal operations. Dropping her facade, Jin-ju openly drops hints about her true identity to a horrified Ba-ra by singing a specific song from their shared orphanage childhood.
| 14 | April 26, 2026 |
After suffering a miscarriage, Jin-ju reconciles with Yong-joong, but her toxic spending habits strain their marriage. To prevent a divorce, Jin-ju tracks down a hiding Ba-ra and proposes another brain transplant. Concurrently, DNA tests reveal Paul Kim is Ba-ra's biological father, making Ba-ra and real Momo paternal half-sisters.
| 15 | May 2, 2026 |
Cornered by her criminal biological father, Jin-ju uses her surgical scars and intimate childhood knowledge to prove her identity. Desperate to reclaim Ju-shin, Jin-ju pressures Ba-ra into a body swap. Ba-ra consents to protect Momo's body, but the procedure goes wrong, leaving Jin-ju brain-dead and Ba-ra trapped in Momo's body.
| 16 | May 3, 2026 |
After Ba-ra's original body (holding Jin-ju's brain) dies and is cremated, Ba-ra (in Momo's body) mourns with Yong-joong. Jin-ju's spirit briefly manifests at the temple. In a final twist, Shin Ju-shin is murdered by Kim Gwang-cheol, only for his consciousness to wake up trapped inside the body of a dog.

== Production ==
The development of Doctor Shin began when screenwriter Im Sung-han (credited as Phoebe), who penned Durian's Affair (2023), Love (ft. Marriage and Divorce) (2021), and Princess Aurora (2013), joined Arc Media (now known as Syn&Studio) in August 2023. Scheduling discussions were already underway in March 2025 for TV Chosun. Five months later, Min Sun-hong, (Note: Min Sun-hong changed his name to Jung E-chan in February 2026.) Baek Seo-ra, (Note: Baek Seo-ra's real name is Hyeongshin, a member of the girl group Hot Issue, and she was given the name Baek Seo-ra by the writer of the series.) Ahn Woo-yeon, Song Ji-in, Ji Young-san, Joo Se-bin, and Cheon Young-min were cast to lead the series. The lead and supporting actors were all chosen through auditions. The series is a medical melodrama thriller directed by Lee Seung-hoon and produced by Syn&Studio and TME Group.

Principal photography commenced in July 2025 and ended after seven months. It concluded in the Eulwang-ri area of Incheon.

The screenwriter Phoebe describes the series as a story exploring how medicine and medical practice impact human lives and destinies, rather than a traditional medical drama. She named the protagonist Shin Ju-shin, using the character for 'spirit' (神), given the show's theme of altering the human brain. She and the producer sought novice actors who fit the characters' "unconventional, unique, and mysterious charm", and felt the auditions succeeded in finding them. Shin Ju-shin is described as a character who inherits his father's hospital, possessing confidence in his skills and a free spirit. To reflect the character's personality, Phoebe asked Jung E-chan to keep his hair long. This is the writer's debut medical thriller, exploring love's true target – body or soul – through brain swapping.

Baek Seo-ra, former main dancer of Hot Issue which disbanded in 2022, made her acting debut as the main character Momo. From the audition process, she stated that there were two rounds. After passing the first round, she participated in a second round that lasted 10 hours and was conducted in a tournament-style format. Baek stated that she was surprised by her casting. She noted that the audition for writer Im Sung-han was competitive, and said her approach was to focus on doing her best rather than on winning. She added that she aimed to avoid being overly ambitious and to perform without regrets, and believed the production team appreciated her effort. She earned the nickname "Im Sung-han's Cinderella" after being cast in the lead role as a newcomer, which was seen as demonstrating her potential. She stated that maintaining a stable career after being discovered through the writer's work is important to earning such a title. She expressed happiness at receiving the title and said she intends to work hard to continue her career. In the series, Baek Seo-ra portrays four roles following the brain swap, as the consciousnesses of Hyun Ran-hee, Kim Jin-ju, and Geum Ba-ra enter Momo's body. Baek said she was initially concerned when told she would portray multiple characters in addition to the lead role in her debut project. However, she viewed it as an opportunity to demonstrate her range as an actress and resolved to work harder to perform the roles successfully. Baek stated that the script clearly defined each character's traits, which helped her in differentiating them. She credited the writer and senior actors with helping her develop the roles during readings, including specific habits such as Jin-ju's lip-licking and Ran-hee's subtle eye-rolling. Distinct vocal characteristics were also established for both Ran-hee and Jin-ju. She described the original Momo as calm and said she emphasized the "sophistication" noted by the writer, which she felt distinguished Momo from Ran-hee and Jin-ju.

== Release ==
Doctor Shin was reportedly scheduled to premiere on TV Chosun in the first half of 2026. By February 2026, the premiere date was confirmed to be on March 14, 2026, airing every Saturday and Sunday at 22:30 (KST). It is also available for streaming on Coupang Play.

== Original soundtrack ==
Produced by Storypeak and XP, the original soundtrack for Doctor Shin was released every Sunday from March 22 to April 26, 2026. Notably, lead actress Baek Seo-ra and Joo Se-bin performed a song for the series. Baek performed "Call My Name" (이름을 불러줘) from the third installment, released April 5, 2026, depicting Momo's identity confusion, while Joo performed "Always" (언제나) from the sixth installment, released April 26, 2026, capturing Geum Ba-ra's emotions.

=== Part 1 ===
Released on March 22, 2026
| No. | Title | Lyrics | Music | Artist | Length |
|---|---|---|---|---|---|
| 1. | "Remember" | Loner | Loner | Hajin | 2:39 |

=== Part 2 ===
Released on March 29, 2026
| No. | Title | Lyrics | Music | Artist | Length |
|---|---|---|---|---|---|
| 1. | "All You Left Me Was Your Scent" (그댄 내게 향기만 남기고) | Kvn; Javn; Loner | Loner; Javn; Kvn | Lee Solomon | 4:06 |

=== Part 3 ===
Released on April 5, 2026
| No. | Title | Lyrics | Music | Artist | Length |
|---|---|---|---|---|---|
| 1. | "Call My Name" (이름을 불러줘) | Loner | Loner | Baek Seo-ra | 3:50 |

=== Part 4 ===
Released on April 12, 2026
| No. | Title | Lyrics | Music | Artist | Length |
|---|---|---|---|---|---|
| 1. | "The Day We Were" (그날의 우리) | Loner | Loner; Javn; Kvn | Anda | 3:57 |

=== Part 5 ===
Released on April 20, 2026
| No. | Title | Lyrics | Music | Artist | Length |
|---|---|---|---|---|---|
| 1. | "The Wave" (파도) | Aron; Loner | Aron; Jae Woek; Loner | Aron | 3:38 |

=== Part 6 ===
Released on April 26, 2026
| No. | Title | Lyrics | Music | Artist | Length |
|---|---|---|---|---|---|
| 1. | "Always" (언제나) | Platard; Loner; Syully | Platard; Dex | Joo Se-bin | 3:33 |

=== Part 7 ===
Released on April 26, 2026
| No. | Title | Lyrics | Music | Artist | Length |
|---|---|---|---|---|---|
| 1. | "Memento Mori" | M1nu | Milium; M1nu | M1nu | 3:16 |

== Reception ==
Doctor Shin received generally negative reviews. According to Hankyung, the series faced criticism for its premise involving a brain-swap surgery between a leading actress and her mother. The outlet described the plot and character actions as "괴랄하다", meaning "bizarre" and "grotesque", and claimed the concept pushed beyond reasonable storytelling limits. Industry critics noted that while the writer had historically succeeded with extreme "makjang" elements, the series showed that shock-value tactics are an outdated concept that no longer resonate with modern streaming audiences. Lead actor Jung E-chan received significant public attention for his performance. IZE reported that while his acting did not meet conventional standards of quality, his distinctive delivery led to numerous memes and clips circulating on social media, which drew additional viewership. The finale ended with a character's brain transplanted into a dog that was later revealed to be Doctor Shin. Described as a "strange twist of fate", the scene stunned audiences and critics and left a lasting impression.

=== Face-reveal controversy ===
During the broadcast of the series in April 2026, it was promoted that the writer Im Sung-han (Phoebe) would make her first public appearance and face reveal in 36 years on a live YouTube broadcast hosted by comedian Eom Eun-hyang. However, during the actual stream on April 17, the expected face reveal did not take place. Instead, the writer only participated through a 75-minute phone interview, leaving viewers and fans disappointed.

== Viewership ==
The series premiered with a 1.4% nationwide audience share, a figure also recorded in the Seoul metropolitan area. Ratings for subsequent episodes remained between 1% and 1.5%, lower than the screenwriter's previous works. In the second half of its run, viewership saw a modest increase, rising to over 2.2% for episode 14 and peaking at 2.3% for the final episode.

Doctor Shin : South Korea viewers per episode (thousands)

| Season | Episode number | | | | | | | | | | | | | | | |
| Season | 1 | 2 | 3 | 4 | 5 | 6 | 7 | 8 | 9 | 10 | 11 | 12 | 13 | 14 | 15 | 16 |
|---|---|---|---|---|---|---|---|---|---|---|---|---|---|---|---|---|
| 1 | N/A | N/A | N/A | 395 | N/A | N/A | 285 | N/A | 282 | 357 | 278 | 424 | 350 | 478 | 425 | 518 |

Source: Audience measurement performed nationwide by Nielsen Korea.

Average TV viewership ratings
| Ep. | Original broadcast date | Average audience share (Nielsen Korea) | |
| Ep. | Original broadcast date | Nationwide | Seoul |
|---|---|---|---|
| 1 | March 14, 2026 | 1.4% (12th) | 1.354% (10th) |
| 2 | March 15, 2026 | 1.4% (14th) | N/A |
| 3 | March 21, 2026 | 1.3% (14th) | N/A |
| 4 | March 22, 2026 | 1.501% (10th) | 1.430% (9th) |
| 5 | March 28, 2026 | 0.9% (18th) | N/A |
| 6 | March 29, 2026 | 1.2% (12th) | N/A |
| 7 | April 4, 2026 | 1.307% (10th) | N/A |
| 8 | April 5, 2026 | 1.2% (15th) | N/A |
| 9 | April 11, 2026 | 1.2% (11th) | N/A |
| 10 | April 12, 2026 | 1.466% (8th) | 1.583% (5th) |
| 11 | April 18, 2026 | 1.1% (12th) | 1.281% (7th) |
| 12 | April 19, 2026 | 1.839% (8th) | 1.802% (8th) |
| 13 | April 25, 2026 | 1.565% (5th) | 1.626% (3rd) |
| 14 | April 26, 2026 | 2.244% (2nd) | 2.171% (3rd) |
| 15 | May 2, 2026 | 1.792% (3rd) | 1.647% (2nd) |
| 16 | May 3, 2026 | 2.321% (2nd) | 2.257% (2nd) |
| Average | | 1.483% | — (Note: Due to multiple unpublished ratings, the exact average rating is unknown.) |
In the table above, the blue numbers represent the lowest ratings and the red numbers represent the highest ratings.; N/A denotes ratings that were not published.; This series aired on a cable channel/pay TV which normally has a relatively smaller audience compared to free-to-air TV/public broadcasters (KBS, SBS, MBC and EBS).
