= Im Sung-han =

South Korean television screenwriter (born 1960)

- Born: Im Young-ran; August 24, 1960 (age 66); South Korea
- Other names: Lim/Yim Sung-han; Im Hyang-ran; Phoebe
- Education: Chungju National University - Computer Science
- Occupation: Screenwriter
- Years active: 1990–2015; 2021-present
- Agent(s): Jidam Inc. (2020-2025); Syn&Studio (since 2025)
- Spouse: Son Moon-kwon (2007-12; his death)

Korean name
- Hangul: 임영란
- RR: Im Yeongran
- MR: Im Yŏngnan

Pen name
- Hangul: 임성한
- RR: Im Seonghan
- MR: Im Sŏnghan

Im Sung-han (Korean: 임성한; born August 24, 1960), born Im Young-ran, is a South Korean television screenwriter. Her best-known dramas include Miss Mermaid, Dear Heaven and Love (ft. Marriage and Divorce).

== Career ==
Im Sung-han began her career writing for single-episode anthologies. Her first known work was the 1991 episode "Standing in a Maze" for KBS's Drama Game, then she moved on to MBC's Best Theater in 1997, with "Definitely" (for which Im won a screenplay award). She also used another pseudonym, Im Hyang-ran (임향란), in writing other Best Theater episodes.

This led to her first television drama series in 1998, See and See Again (also known as Looking Again and Again and Can't Take My Eyes Off You), about two families doubly related by marriage. Despite its popularity (its peak rating of 57.3% was the highest ever recorded for a daily soap opera), it was considered by TV critics as one of the worst dramas that year. Im's follow-up Foolish Princes (2000) was about four half-brothers, and she and director Jo Jung-hyun had conflicts over her writing.

Miss Mermaid (2002) starred Jang Seo-hee as a TV writer whose father left her and her blind mother years ago, so she decides to wreak revenge by writing a thinly veiled autobiographical series and casts her unsuspecting stepmother, an actress, in the role of the blind, deserted wife; she also steals her half-sister's fiancé. It recorded high ratings of 40%, resulting in several extensions for the drama. At the MBC Drama Awards, Jang won Best Actress and the Grand Prize. But Miss Mermaid also attracted criticism, and the Anti Im Sung-han Café was established, an Internet community club whose thousands of members are vehement critics of Im. It was the first ever "anti-café" to target a Korean drama writer. Their online posts mocked the drama's "nonsensical" plot, along with scenes which implied that a baby's autism was caused by his mother's stress during a divorce, and that washing each strawberry with a toothbrush is described as normal.

Lee Da-hae rose to fame in Heaven's Fate (also known as Lotus Flower Fairy, 2004), in her role of a woman who loses everything when she becomes possessed by spirits as a Korean shaman, called a "mudang." The drama questioned whether it's possible to overcome one's fate. When ratings remained in the 20% range, Im was later replaced by another writer, Kim Na-hyun.

Dear Heaven (2005–2006) starred Han Hye-sook as a middle-aged woman who wants to atone to the biological daughter (Yoon Jung-hee) she'd abandoned, by deliberately matchmaking the latter with her current stepson (Lee Tae-gon). Viewers were divided on whether it was "immoral" and "incestuous," and the controversy propelled it to becoming the 5th highest rated TV program in Korea for the year 2006. Han won the Grand Prize at the SBS Drama Awards.

Opposites Attract (also known as Ahyeon-dong Madam and Queen of Ahyun, 2007) explored age differences in relationships, when a female public prosecutor (Wang Hee-ji) falls for a male colleague (Kim Min-sung) who is 12 years younger.

Assorted Gems (also known as Jewel Bibimbap, 2009) portrayed the ups and downs of a family with four brothers and sisters named after jewels: Jade, Ruby, Coral, and Amber (played by Go Na-eun, So Yi-hyun, Lee Hyun-jin and Lee Il-min, respectively).

The premise of New Tales of Gisaeng (2011) was that "gisaeng"—the Korean equivalent of courtesans equipped with wide knowledge in poetry, culture and politics, who entertained noblemen and royalty of the Joseon period—continue to exist in modern-day Korea. Newcomers Im Soo-hyang and Sung Hoon played the lead roles. Despite ratings of over 20%, it was criticized for Im's abrupt inclusion of supernatural elements which were considered "pointless" to the plot by viewers.

Princess Aurora (2013) was about the romance between the youngest daughter (Jeon So-min) of a wealthy family who owns a food conglomerate, and an irritable novelist (Oh Chang-seok). But the show gained notoriety when Im abruptly killed off 12 characters and was accused of nepotism.

This was followed by Apgujeong Midnight Sun (2014–2015), about four people (and their families) whose lives intersect while working at a cable TV station. But the series received scrutiny from the Korea Communications Standards Commission for a revenge storyline that the review board deemed too "violent" and "unethical."

On April 23, 2015, MBC released a statement that the network would no longer work with Im in future projects; Im responded by announcing her retirement, saying she had intended to quit the TV industry after writing 10 dramas.

In January 2019, Im launched her first book, "Cancer Cells Are Part of Life" (literal translation), which chronicled her health issues and habits. Published by her own company Book Soopulim, the title was based on a controversial line from Princess Aurora.

On August 6, 2020, Im signed an exclusive management contract with Jidam Inc. In an earlier press release, the company stated that her next project may happen in 2021, however, it was eventually confirmed that her comeback drama titled Love (ft. Marriage and Divorce) will air in December 2020 via TV Chosun.

In August 2023, Im joined Arc Media (now known as Syn&Studio).

=== Critical assessment ===
Im is considered a hitmaker, as most of her projects reach 20-30% television ratings on average. But she is divisive, becoming a target of criticism from viewers and the media for her excessive use of provocative storylines (called "makjang" in Korean, this typically involves adultery, revenge, rape, birth secrets, fatal illnesses and incest).

== Personal life ==
Im met assistant director Son Moon-kwon while filming Dear Heaven, and the couple married in January 2007. They later collaborated on Opposites Attract (like the protagonists, Im and Son also had a 12-year age difference), Assorted Gems, and New Tales of Gisaeng.

On January 21, 2012, the 40-year-old Son committed suicide by hanging himself from a staircase with a necktie, at his house in Ilsan, Gyeonggi Province. Im was the one who found him, and she requested the police that the death be kept a secret from his family and colleagues. News about Son's death broke nearly a month later on February 13.

In March 2012, Son's family filed a ₩50 million lawsuit against Im for psychological injury because she told them of his death three weeks after the fact, and held the funeral secretly, preventing an opportunity for family and friends to pay their respects. In an interview, Son's sister alleged that her brother and Im were married in name only (in order to further Im's career), and never lived together in their five years of marriage. Finding it suspicious that Im lied to them that their son had died of a heart attack, and doubting the authenticity of his will, Son's parents asked the police for a re-investigation, in case of foul play. In October 2012, prosecutors cleared Im over her husband's death, and officially ruled Son's death a suicide. The psychological injury lawsuit is ongoing.

== Filmography ==
- KBS Drama Game "Standing in a Maze" (KBS2, 1991)
- MBC Best Theater "Definitely" (MBC, 1997)
- MBC Best Theater "Two Women" (MBC, 1997)
- MBC Best Theater "Solomon's Thief" (MBC, 1997)
- MBC Best Theater "Gasibeosi" (MBC, 1997)
- MBC Best Theater "Sex, Lies and Seonggyeokcha" (MBC, 1997)
- See and See Again (MBC, 1998–1999)
- MBC Best Theater "Secret Tears" (MBC, 1999)
- Foolish Princes (MBC, 2000–2001)
- Miss Mermaid (MBC, 2002–2003)
- Heaven's Fate (MBC, 2004–2005)
- Dear Heaven (SBS, 2005–2006)
- Opposite Attraction (MBC, 2007–2008)
- Assorted Gems (MBC, 2009–2010)
- New Tales of Gisaeng (SBS, 2011)
- Princess Aurora (MBC, 2013)
- Apgujeong Midnight Sun (MBC, 2014–2015)
- Love (ft. Marriage and Divorce) (TV Chosun, 2021)
- Durian's Affair (TV Chosun, 2023)
- Doctor Shin (TV Chosun, 2026)
