= TME Group =

South Korean television company

- Logo
- Native name: 티엠이그룹
- Formerly: HIGROUND (하이그라운드)
- Type: Private subsidiary
- Industry: Entertainment
- Predecessor: HIGROUND; CHOSUN E&M
- Founded: June 2, 2014; 12 years ago
- Founder: Bang Jung-oh
- Headquarters: Seoul, South Korea
- Key people: Ahn Seok-jun (CEO)
- Products: Korean drama, film
- Services: Production; Distribution
- Revenue: ₩634.95 billion (2024)
- Net income: ₩4.89 billion (2024)
- Owner: Bang Jeong-oh 29.10%; Brilliant Goji Limited 29.10%; GTI Management 16.12%; ACCEL Technology Holdings Limited 8.15%; SK Joint Investment 2021 Private Equity Partnership 6.35%; KB Global Contents Private Equity Fund 4.76%; Kakao Entertainment 3.17%; SGAce Co., Ltd. 3.17%
- Number of employees: 20
- Website: https://tme-group.co.kr/

TME Group (formerly known as C-Story and HIGROUND) is a South Korean drama production company.

== History ==
The company was founded in 2014 as C-Story, by Bang Jung-oh, the former CEO of TV Chosun, and the second son of the parent company for TV Chosun.

On June 10, 2025, it merged with Chosun E&M The company name was changed from HIGROUND to TME Group.

== Production works ==
=== Drama ===
year	broadcaster	title	co-producer	ref
2014	TV Chosun	The Greatest Marriage		
2015		Life in Additional Time		
2016	MBC TV	Night Light	Victory Contents	
2017	Netflix	My Runway		
2018	TV Chosun	Grand Prince		
2019	TV Chosun	Babel	Want's Maker Pictures	
2019	TV Chosun	Joseon Survival Period	Huayi Brothers Korea, Lotte Cultureworks	
2019	TV Chosun	Leverage: Fraudsters	Production H	
2020	TV Chosun	Queen: Love and War	Kotop Media	
2020	TV Chosun	Kingmaker: The Change of Destiny	Victory Contents	
2020	TV Chosun	Get Revenge	Blossom Story, Story Hunter	
2021	tvN	Mouse	studio invictus	
2021	TV Chosun	Love (ft. Marriage and Divorce) 2	Jidam Media, Chorokbaem Media	
2021	TV Chosun	Uncle	Monster Union	
2022	TV Chosun	Love (ft. Marriage and Divorce) 3	Jidam Media, Chorokbaem Media	
2022	TV Chosun	Becoming Witch	JS Pictures, great story	
2022	KBS2	The Law Cafe	Jidam Media	
2022	TV Chosun	Red Balloon	Chorokbaem Media	
2023	JTBC	Divorce Attorney Shin	SLL, Glmo	
2023	tvN	The Heavenly Idol	Pita Pat Studio	
2023	TV Chosun	Durian's Affair	Barunson Studio	
2023	TV Chosun	My Happy Ending	Story Vine Pictures, Studio IN	
2024	U+ Mobile TV	Branding in Seongsu	STUDIO X+U, Studio V Plus	
2024	TVING	Dongjae, the Good or the Bastard	Studio Dragon, Ace Factory	
2024	TV Chosun	DNA Lover	IP Box Media, Fan Entertainment	
2024	KBS2	Who Is She!	Studio V Plus, Idea Factory, Yein Plus	
2025	tvN	Our Unwritten Seoul	Monster Union	
2025	JTBC	The Nice Guys	Hive Media Corp, SLL	
2025	TV Chosun/Coupang Play; Prime Video (outside Korea)	Confidence Queen	GHOST4 Production, The Fifth Wall Studio	
2025	TVchosun	No Next Life	First Man Studio, Megaphone	
2026	TVchosun	Doctor Shin	Syn&Studio	

=== Film ===
year	distributor	title	co-producer	ref
2025	Plus M Entertainment	Secret: Untold Melody	Hive Media Corp, Solaire Partners	
