= Love (ft. Marriage and Divorce) =

2021 South Korean television series

- Promotional poster for season 3
- Hangul: 결혼작사 이혼작곡
- Hanja: 結婚作詞 離婚作曲
- Lit.: Marriage Lyrics and Divorce Music
- RR: Gyeolhonjaksa ihonjakgok
- MR: Kyŏrhonjaksa ihonjakkok
- Genre: Melodrama
- Written by: Phoebe
- Directed by: Yoo Jung-joon (S1–2); Lee Seung-hoon (S1–2); Oh Sang-won (S3); Choi Young-su (S3)
- Starring: Sung Hoon; Lee Tae-gon; Park Joo-mi; Lee Ga-ryeong; Lee Min-young; Jeon Soo-kyeong; Jeon No-min; Moon Sung-ho; Kang Shin-hyo; Bu Bae; Gee Young-san; Song Ji-in; Lim Hye-young
- Composers: Lee Sang-ho (S1); Jeon Chang-seob (S2–3)
- Country of origin: South Korea
- Original language: Korean
- No. of seasons: 3
- No. of episodes: 48

Production
- Executive producers: Jung Hee-suk (S1); Hwangbo Sang-mi (S3)
- Producers: Seo Hye-jin (planner); Ahn Hyung-jo; Jung Hee-suk (S2–3); Kim Sang-hun; Hwangbo Sang-mi (S1–2); Park Chae-won (S3); Baek Ji-soo (S3)
- Running time: 66–80 minutes
- Production companies: Hi Ground (season 2–3); Jidam Inc.; Chorokbaem Media

Original release
- Network: TV Chosun
- Release: January 23, 2021 – May 1, 2022

Love (ft. Marriage and Divorce) (Korean: 결혼작사 이혼작곡) is a South Korean television series starring Sung Hoon, Lee Tae-gon, Park Joo-mi, Lee Ga-ryeong, Lee Min-young, Jeon Soo-kyeong and Jeon No-min. The first season aired on TV Chosun from January 23 to March 14, 2021, on Saturdays and Sundays at 21:00 (KST). This drama is available for worldwide streaming on Netflix.

The second season was aired on TV Chosun from June 12 to August 8, 2021, on Saturdays and Sundays at 21:00 (KST). It is available for streaming on Netflix. The second season finale episode reached a nationwide rating of 16.582%, making it the fourteenth highest-rated drama in Korean cable television history.

The third season was aired on TV Chosun from February 16 to May 1, 2022. The last episode of this season recorded 10.39% nationwide viewership, which was its best for the season. It is available for streaming on Netflix.

== Series overview ==
Season	Episodes	Originally released		Time slot	Avg. viewership (millions)
Season	Episodes	First released	Last released	Time slot	Avg. viewership (millions)
1	16	January 23, 2021	March 14, 2021	Saturday and Sunday at 21:00 (KST)	1.614
2	16	June 12, 2021	August 8, 2021	Saturday and Sunday at 21:00 KST	1.954
3	16	February 26, 2022	May 1, 2022	Saturday and Sunday at 21:00 KST	1.657

== Synopsis ==
The series tells the story of three married couples, each in their 30s, 40s and 50s.

== Cast ==
=== Main ===
- Sung Hoon (season 1-2), Kang Shin-hyo (season 3) as Pan Sa-hyeon, a lawyer
- Lee Tae-gon (season 1-2), Gee Young-san (season 3) as Shin Yu-shin, a psychiatrist
- Park Joo-mi as Sa Pi-young, Yu-shin's wife, a producer of a radio show.
- Lee Ga-ryeong as Boo Hye-ryung, Sa-hyeon's wife, a radio show host.
- Lee Min-young as Song Won, a Chinese translator and the mistress of Sa-hyeon.
- Jeon Soo-kyeong as Lee Si-eun, a writer of a radio show
- Jeon No-min as Park Hae-ryun, Si-eun's husband, a professor of Department of Theater.
- Moon Sung-ho as Seo Ban, an engineer of a radio show, Pi-young, Hye-ryung and Si-eun's colleague. (season 2-3; recurring season 1)
- Bu Bae as Seo Dong-ma, Ban's younger brother, Ga-bin's ex-boyfriend. (season 2-3; recurring season 1)
- Song Ji-in as A Mi, a model and the mistress of Yu-shin. (season 2; recurring season 1, 3)
- Lim Hye-young as Nam Ga-bin, a musical actress, Hae-ryun's colleague and mistress. (season 2; recurring season 1, 3)

=== Supporting ===
- Kim Eung-soo as Pan Mun-ho, Sa-hyeon's father
- Kim Bo-yeon (season 1-2), Lee Hye-sook (season 3) as Kim Dong-mi, Yu-shin's stepmother
- Roh Joo-hyun as Shin Gi-rim, Yu-shin's father
- Lee Hyo-chun as Mo Seo-hyang, Pi-young's mother (season 1-2)
- Lee Jong-nam as So Ye-jeong, Sa-hyeon's mother
- Han Jin-hee as President Seo, Ban and Dong-ma's father (season 3)
- Yoon Seo-hyun as Jo Woong, Dean of Chinese Medicine Hospital, A Mi's biological father. (season 1-2)
- Jeon Hye-won as Park Hyang-gi, Si-eun and Hae-ryun's daughter, Woo-ram's elder sister.
- Im Han-bin as Park Woo-ram, Si-eun and Hae-ryun's son
- Park Seo-kyung as Shin Ji-ah, Yu-shin and Pi-young's daughter
- Shin Soo-ho as Attorney Yoon, Sa-hyun's colleague (season 1-2)
- Bae Yoo-ri as Joon-jae, the Pan family's housekeeper (season 1-2)

=== Special appearances ===
- Yoon Hae-young as Ji Su-hui, A Mi's mother (season 1-2)
- Hong Ji-min as Oh Jin-a, friend of Hae-ryun and Ga-bin (season 1, 3)

==== Season 1 ====
- Oh Seung-ah as Lee Yeon-hee, a colleague of Pi-young, Hye-ryung and Si-eun
- Shin Joo-ah as Lee Soo-jung, the wife of Yeon-hee's boyfriend
- Hyun Suk as Mun-ho's friend
- Seo Yu-ri
- April 2 (Band)
- Park Jun-myun as Audrey

==== Season 2 ====
- Lee Sook as Mo Seo-ri, Seo-hyang's younger sister
- Hong Ji-yoon as a clerk of diamond jewelry store
- Lim Baek-cheon as a guest on a radio program hosted by Boo Hye-ryung
- Park Sang-min as himself

== Production ==
Five years after announcing her retirement from the industry, television screenwriter Phoebe signed an exclusive management contract with Jidam Inc. in early August 2020 and stated that her next project would air in the first half of 2021.

On October 29, 2021, news outlets reported that Lee Tae-gon and Sung Hoon would not appear in season 3. The drama staff later said that the season production and Lee's and Sung's appearances had not been confirmed and were in talks. That same day, it was reported that Kang Shin-hyo would replace Sung Hoon as Pan Seo-hyun; Kang's agency Ace Factory said he had received an offer and was considering it. The next day, it was reported that Kwon Hyuk-jong would join the cast as Shin Yu-shin, originally played by Lee Tae-gon.

On January 25, 2022, it was announced that season 3 would air starting on February 26, 2022.

On March 17, 2022, actor Kang Shin-hyo was diagnosed with COVID-19 and quarantined until March 23. On April 13, 2022, actress Song Ji-in was diagnosed with COVID-19 and entered treatment.

== Original soundtrack ==
=== Season 2 ===
==== Part 1 ====
Released on June 4, 2021
No.	Title	Lyrics	Music	Artist	Length
1.	"Love Again"	Choi Byeong-chang, J-Season	Byeongchang Choi, Hyunjun Kim, J-Season	Hong Ji-yoon	3:49
2.	"Love Again" (Inst.)				3:49

== Viewership ==
Season 1

A 6.9% viewership rating was recorded nationwide for the series premiere, making it the highest-rated drama of TV Chosun at the time, surpassing Queen: Love and War, Kingmaker: The Change of Destiny, and Grand Prince.

The eighth episode logged a nationwide average viewership of 9.656%, making it the thirty third highest-rated drama in Korean cable television history.

Season 2

According to Nielsen Korea, the final episode of the second season aired on August 8, 2021, scored an average nationwide rating of 16.582%, which is the highest rating in two seasons, breaking its own record for the highest viewership ratings achieved by any drama in TV Chosun history. The second season became the eighth highest-rated drama in Korean cable television history.

Season 3

According to viewer ratings research firm Nielsen Korea, 32nd episode aired on May 1, recorded 10.395% nationwide viewership. It was the highest viewership ratings for season 3.

Love (ft. Marriage and Divorce) : South Korea viewers per episode (millions)

Season	Episode number																Average
Season	1	2	3	4	5	6	7	8	9	10	11	12	13	14	15	16	Average
1	1.373	1.401	1.754	1.496	1.722	1.640	1.609	1.913	1.415	1.618	1.602	1.792	1.585	1.604	1.606	1.691	1.614
2	0.910	0.921	1.056	1.154	1.194	1.362	1.778	1.869	2.236	2.367	2.661	2.444	2.522	2.614	2.844	3.344	1.954
3	1.309	1.405	1.415	1.547	1.585	1.547	1.730	1.755	1.913	1.646	1.853	1.821	1.743	1.383	1.802	2.060	1.657

Source: Audience measurement performed nationwide by Nielsen Korea.

Season 1

Average TV viewership ratings (season 1)
Ep.	Part	Original broadcast date	Average audience share (Nielsen Korea)	
Ep.	Part	Original broadcast date	Nationwide	Seoul
1	1	January 23, 2021	5.708% (4th)	5.295% (3rd)
1	2	January 23, 2021	6.864% (2nd)	6.771% (1st)
2	1	January 24, 2021	5.838% (4th)	5.782% (4th)
2	2	January 24, 2021	7.178% (2nd)	7.095% (1st)
3	1	January 30, 2021	7.257% (3rd)	6.900% (2nd)
3	2	January 30, 2021	8.899% (1st)	8.719% (1st)
4	1	January 31, 2021	6.417% (3rd)	6.564% (2nd)
4	2	January 31, 2021	7.582% (1st)	7.756% (1st)
5	1	February 6, 2021	7.869% (2nd)	8.393% (2nd)
5	2	February 6, 2021	9.062% (1st)	9.813% (1st)
6	1	February 7, 2021	5.849% (4th)	6.366% (4th)
6	2	February 7, 2021	8.138% (1st)	8.348% (1st)
7	1	February 13, 2021	7.521% (3rd)	8.529% (2nd)
7	2	February 13, 2021	8.034% (1st)	8.705% (1st)
8	1	February 14, 2021	8.171% (3rd)	8.719% (2nd)
8	2	February 14, 2021	9.656% (1st)	10.021% (1st)
9	1	February 20, 2021	7.562% (2nd)	7.772% (2nd)
9	2	February 20, 2021	7.671% (1st)	7.868% (1st)
10	1	February 21, 2021	8.002% (2nd)	8.218% (2nd)
10	2	February 21, 2021	8.664% (1st)	8.475% (1st)
11	1	February 27, 2021	7.047% (2nd)	6.752% (2nd)
11	2	February 27, 2021	8.171% (1st)	8.073% (1st)
12	1	February 28, 2021	7.637% (2nd)	7.550% (2nd)
12	2	February 28, 2021	8.656% (1st)	8.487% (1st)
13	1	March 6, 2021	6.516% (3rd)	6.527% (2nd)
13	2	March 6, 2021	8.288% (1st)	8.271% (1st)
14	1	March 7, 2021	7.573% (2nd)	7.654% (2nd)
14	2	March 7, 2021	8.328% (1st)	8.365% (1st)
15	1	March 13, 2021	5.708% (3rd)	5.380% (3rd)
15	2	March 13, 2021	8.434% (1st)	8.486% (1st)
16	1	March 14, 2021	7.130% (2nd)	7.763% (2nd)
16	2	March 14, 2021	8.751% (1st)	8.979% (1st)
Average			7.631%	7.762%
In the table above, the blue numbers represent the lowest ratings and the red numbers represent the highest ratings.; This drama airs on a cable channel/pay TV which normally has a relatively smaller audience compared to free-to-air TV/public broadcasters (KBS, SBS, MBC and EBS).

Season 2

Average TV viewership ratings (season 2)
Ep.	Part	Original broadcast date	Average audience share Nielsen Korea	
Ep.	Part	Original broadcast date	Nationwide	Seoul
1	1	June 12, 2021	4.277% (6th)	3.887% (8th)
1	2	June 12, 2021	4.903% (5th)	4.971% (3rd)
2	1	June 13, 2021	4.409% (5th)	4.532% (5th)
2	2	June 13, 2021	5.079% (3rd)	4.996% (4th)
3	1	June 19, 2021	5.415% (4th)	5.225% (4th)
3	2	June 19, 2021	6.093% (3rd)	5.887% (2nd)
4	1	June 20, 2021	5.893% (4th)	5.964% (3rd)
4	2	June 20, 2021	6.219% (2nd)	6.279% (2nd)
5	1	June 26, 2021	5.017% (4th)	5.468% (4th)
5	2	June 26, 2021	6.418% (2nd)	6.681% (2nd)
6	1	June 27, 2021	6.525% (3rd)	6.640% (3rd)
6	2	June 27, 2021	6.967% (2nd)	6.966% (2nd)
7	1	July 3, 2021	7.760% (3rd)	7.771% (3rd)
7	2	July 3, 2021	8.928%(2nd)	8.616%(2nd)
8	1	July 4, 2021	8.796%(3rd)	8.855%(3rd)
8	2	July 4, 2021	9.334% (2nd)	9.473% (1st)
9	1	July 10, 2021	8.634% (2nd)	8.609% (2nd)
9	2	July 10, 2021	11.275% (1st)	11.096% (1st)
10	1	July 11, 2021	9.339% (2nd)	9.244% (2nd)
10	2	July 11, 2021	11.898% (1st)	11.463% (1st)
11	1	July 17, 2021	10.555% (2nd)	10.659% (2nd)
11	2	July 17, 2021	13.086% (1st)	13.044% (1st)
12	1	July 18, 2021	10.688% (2nd)	10.698% (2nd)
12	2	July 18, 2021	12.538% (1st)	12.325% (1st)
13	1	July 24, 2021 (Note: The 14th episode of the second season, which was scheduled to be aired on July 25, was postponed due to the Olympic broadcast in order to improve the content of the drama.)	10.487% (2nd)	10.334% (2nd)
13	2	July 24, 2021	13.222% (1st)	13.032% (1st)
14	1	August 1, 2021	10.107% (2nd)	10.705% (2nd)
14	2	August 1, 2021	12.617% (1st)	13.307% (1st)
15	1	August 7, 2021	12.178% (2nd)	12.824% (2nd)
15	2	August 7, 2021	14.811% (1st)	15.407% (1st)
16	1	August 8, 2021	13.792% (2nd)	13.934% (2nd)
16	2	August 8, 2021	16.582%(1st)	16.453%(1st)
Average			%	%
In the table above, the blue numbers represent the lowest ratings and the red numbers represent the highest ratings.; This drama airs on a cable channel/pay TV which normally has a relatively smaller audience compared to free-to-air TV/public broadcasters (KBS, SBS, MBC and EBS).

Season 3

Average TV viewership ratings (season 3)
Ep.	Part	Original broadcast date	Average audience share Nielsen Korea	
Ep.	Part	Original broadcast date	Nationwide	Seoul
1	1	February 26, 2022	5.240% (4th)	5.204% (4th)
1	2	February 26, 2022	6.293% (1st)	5.899% (2nd)
2	1	February 27, 2022	5.772% (3rd)	5.541% (3rd)
2	2	February 27, 2022	6.733% (2nd)	6.418% (2nd)
3	1	March 5, 2022	3.674% (7th)	3.763% (6th)
3	2	March 5, 2022	7.150% (1st)	7.008% (2nd)
4	1	March 6, 2022	4.533% (4th)	4.659% (4th)
4	2	March 6, 2022	7.501% (2nd)	7.757% (2nd)
5	1	March 12, 2022	4.327% (4th)	4.600% (4th)
5	2	March 12, 2022	7.812% (1st)	8.041% (1st)
6	1	March 13, 2022	5.526% (3rd)	5.368% (4th)
6	2	March 13, 2022	7.880% (1st)	7.794% (2nd)
7	1	March 19, 2022	4.503% (3rd)	4.853% (3rd)
7	2	March 19, 2022	8.444% (1st)	9.182% (1st)
8	1	March 20, 2022	5.575% (3rd)	5.412% (3rd)
8	2	March 20, 2022	8.468% (1st)	8.168% (2nd)
9	1	March 26, 2022	5.525% (3rd)	5.575% (3rd)
9	2	March 26, 2022	9.159% (1st)	9.463% (1st)
10	1	April 2, 2022 (Note: On March 27, 2022, Episode 10 was cancelled due to the COVID-19 situation, and rescheduled to broadcast on April 2, 2022.)	4.360% (4th)	4.520% (3rd)
10	2	April 2, 2022	8.572% (1st)	8.496% (1st)
11	1	April 9, 2022 (Note: On March 31, 2022, it was confirmed that one episode a week for 3 weeks will be aired due to the COVID-19 situation.)	7.244% (2nd)	8.026% (2nd)
11	2	April 9, 2022	8.985% (1st)	9.614% (1st)
12	1	April 16, 2022	7.167% (2nd)	8.033% (2nd)
12	2	April 16, 2022	8.372% (1st)	9.360% (1st)
13	1	April 23, 2022	7.521% (2nd)	8.158% (2nd)
13	2	April 23, 2022	8.929% (1st)	9.479% (1st)
14	1	April 24, 2022	6.276% (2nd)	6.509% (2nd)
14	2	April 24, 2022	7.501% (1st)	7.336% (1st)
15	1	April 30, 2022	7.598% (2nd)	7.773% (2nd)
15	2	April 30, 2022	8.949% (1st)	9.229% (1st)
16	1	May 1, 2022	9.147% (2nd)	8.900% (2nd)
16	2	May 1, 2022	10.395% (1st)	10.030% (1st)
Average				
In the table above, the blue numbers represent the lowest ratings and the red numbers represent the highest ratings.; This drama airs on a cable channel/pay TV which normally has a relatively smaller audience compared to free-to-air TV/public broadcasters (KBS, SBS, MBC and EBS).
