= Grand Prince (TV series) =

2018 South Korean TV series

- Promotional poster
- Also known as: Grand Prince: He Yearns for Love; The King
- Hangul: 대군 – 사랑을 그리다
- Lit.: Grand Prince – Drawing Love
- RR: Daegun – sarangeul geurida
- MR: Taegun – sarangŭl kŭrida
- Genre: Historical; Romance; Melodrama
- Written by: Jo Hyun-kyung
- Directed by: Kim Jung-min
- Starring: Yoon Shi-yoon; Jin Se-yeon; Joo Sang-wook
- Country of origin: South Korea
- Original language: Korean
- No. of episodes: 20

Production
- Executive producer: Lee Myung-sook
- Production companies: Yein E&M; C-STORY

Original release
- Network: TV Chosun
- Release: March 3 – May 6, 2018

Grand Prince (Korean: 대군 – 사랑을 그리다) is a 2018 South Korean television series starring Yoon Shi-yoon, Jin Se-yeon and Joo Sang-wook. The series aired on TV Chosun from March 3 to May 6, 2018, on Saturdays and Sundays at 22:50 (KST).

The drama achieved a rating of 5.627% for its finale, becoming the fourth-highest-rated TV Chosun drama behind Love (ft. Marriage and Divorce), Queen: Love and War, and Kingmaker: The Change of Destiny.

== Synopsis ==
A drama about two princes who enter into a rivalry due to their love for the same woman. It is loosely based on the true stories of Grand Prince Anpyeong and King Sejo.

== Cast ==
=== Main ===
- Yoon Shi-yoon as Lee Hwi, Prince Eun Sung (Grand Prince Anpyeong)
  - Jeon Jin-seo as young Lee Hwi

The younger brother of Lee Kang and third in line to the throne. He is considered as the most eligible bachelor in Joseon.

- Jin Se-yeon as Sung Ja-hyun

A beautiful and elegant lady who is gentle and passionate. She gets caught up in a love triangle between two princes, but her heart only belongs to Lee Hwi.

- Joo Sang-wook as Lee Kang, Prince Jin Yang (King Sejo)
  - Choi Kwon-soo as young Lee Kang

An ambitious and charismatic prince. Lee Hwi's older brother and second in line to the throne. He dreams of becoming the next King of Joseon.

=== Supporting ===
==== People around Lee Hwi ====
- Nam Ji-hyun^{1} as Roo Shi-gae

Lee Hwi's bodyguard. A woman who grew up in the wild and has strong survival instincts.

- Jo Yun-seo as Jung Seol-hwa

She has a one-sided love for Lee Hwi.

- Choi Sung-jae as Kim Kwan

Lee Hwi's bodyguard.

- Bang Jae-ho as Park Gi-teuk

Lee Hwi's eunuch.

- Yang Mi-kyung as Queen Dowager Shim (Queen Soheon motive)

==== People around Sung Ja-hyun ====
- Lee Ki-young as Sung Wok

Ja-hyun's father.

- Kim Mi-kyung as Ahn Juk-san

Ja-hyun's mother.

- Han Jae-suk as Sung Deuk-shik

Ja-hyun's brother. He has a secret crush on Ggeut-dan.

- Moon Ji-in as Ggeut-dan

Sung Ja-hyun's maid. Despite being born in a distinguished family, she decides to become a maid to escape the demands of her family.

- Jeon Min-seo as Ahn Dan-bi

Sung Ja-hyun's little cousin, she was the member of Queen's Selection.

==== People around Lee Kang ====
- Son Byong-ho as Lee Je, Prince Yang An (Prince Yangnyeong)

The elder brother of King Sejong the Great. Supporter of Lee Kang.

- Ryu Hyo-young as Yoon Na-gyeom (Queen Jeonghui)

Lee Kang's wife. A lady who desires power over love.

- Choo Soo-hyun as Cho Yo-kyung (Cho Yo-gaeng)

A woman who joined forces with Lee Kang to win over Lee Hwi's love.

==== Others ====
- Song Jae-hee as King (King Munjong)
- Jang In-sub as Doh Jeong-gook
- Oh Seung-ah as Royal Noble Consort Hyo of the Jungjeon Kim clan (Queen Hyeondeok)

Kim Gwan's sister, and the King's concubine.

- Kim Joon-ui as Lee Myung, Prince Seung Pyung (King Danjong)
  - Jung Yoon-seok as Lee Myung after 10 years

Queen Dowager Shim's grandson. He is the Crown Prince until the King's death. As the new King even though he was little, his grandma would act as guardian for him to lead the country until he was an adult. While Prince Eun Sung is exiled to another island, he was forced to abdicate by his uncle Prince Jin Yang.

- Shin Yi as Court Lady Jang

The princes' caretaker.

- Lee Chae-eun as Poem
- Kim Bo-bae

Na-gyeom's sidekick.

== Production ==
The first script reading was held on November 23, 2017, at TV Chosun Studio.

== Original soundtrack ==
Grand Prince OST

Soundtrack album by Various Artists
- Recorded: 2018
- Genre: Soundtrack
- Languages: Korean; English
- Label: Warner Bros. (Korea)

=== Part 1 ===
Released on March 3, 2018
No.	Title	Lyrics	Music	Artist	Length
1.	"Follow the Road" (이렇게 길 따라)	Kim Eana	Yoon Il-sang	Kim Yeon-ji	4:19
2.	"Follow the Road" (Inst.)		Yoon Il-sang		4:19
Total length:					8:38

=== Part 2 ===
Released on March 11, 2018
No.	Title	Lyrics	Music	Artist	Length
1.	"Love Is So Mean" (사랑 참 못됐다)	Shin In-soo; Lee Da-won	Shin In-soo	Son Seung-yeon	4:25
2.	"Love Is So Mean" (Inst.)		Shin In-soo		4:25
Total length:					8:50

=== Part 3 ===
Released on April 28, 2018
No.	Title	Lyrics	Music	Artist	Length
1.	"Viverei"	Lim Ji-eun	Lim Ji-eun	Lim Ji-eun	2:59
Total length:					2:59

== Ratings ==
Grand Prince : South Korea viewers per episode (thousands)

Season	Episode number																				Average
Season	1	2	3	4	5	6	7	8	9	10	11	12	13	14	15	16	17	18	19	20	Average
1	484	738	TBD	TBD	TBD	TBD	TBD	524	524	632	489	542	530	714	662	772	703	835	617	1291	TBD

Source: Audience measurement performed nationwide by Nielsen Media Research.

Average TV viewership ratings
Ep.	Original broadcast date	Average audience share			
Ep.	Original broadcast date	AGB Nielsen			TNmS
Ep.	Original broadcast date	Nationwide	Seoul	Peak	TNmS
1	March 3, 2018	2.519%	2.619%	3.0%	1.8%
2	March 4, 2018	3.058%	3.288%	4.1%	2.5%
3	March 10, 2018	1.994%	3.0%	3.9%	2.2%
4	March 11, 2018	2.042%	3.2%	4.0%	2.0%
5	March 17, 2018	1.961%	—N/a	—N/a	1.5%
6	March 18, 2018	1.468%	—N/a	—N/a	1.8%
7	March 24, 2018	1.748%	—N/a	—N/a	1.7%
8	March 25, 2018	2.634%	2.607%	3.3%	2.7%
9	March 31, 2018	2.684%	2.599%	3.0%	2.8%
10	April 1, 2018	2.936%	3.088%	4.2%	2.4%
11	April 7, 2018	2.488%	2.831%	3.9%	2.8%
12	April 8, 2018	2.947%	3.168%	4.3%	2.8%
13	April 14, 2018	2.972%	2.429%	3.8%	3.3%
14	April 15, 2018	3.699%	3.603%	5.0%	3.8%
15	April 21, 2018	3.560%	3.764%	5.0%	3.4%
16	April 22, 2018	4.188%	4.228%	6.1%	4.0%
17	April 28, 2018	3.612%	3.708%	4.7%	3.0%
18	April 29, 2018	3.882%	4.135%	5.9%	3.5%
19	May 5, 2018	3.432%	3.547%	4.8%	3.7%
20	May 6, 2018	5.627%	5.681%	7.1%	4.1%
Average		2.973%	3.382%	4.5%	2.8%
In this table, the blue numbers represent the lowest ratings and the red numbers represent the highest ratings.; This drama airs on a cable channel/pay TV which normally has a relatively smaller audience compared to free-to-air TV/public broadcasters (KBS, SBS, MBC and EBS).; N/A denotes that the rating is not known.

== Awards and nominations ==
Year	Award	Category	Nominee	Result	Ref.
2018	6th APAN Star Awards	Excellence Award, Actor in a Miniseries	Yoon Shi-yoon	Nominated	

== Notes ==
- ^{1}Credited as Son Ji-hyun.
