= Song Won-geun =

South Korean singer and actor (born 1982)

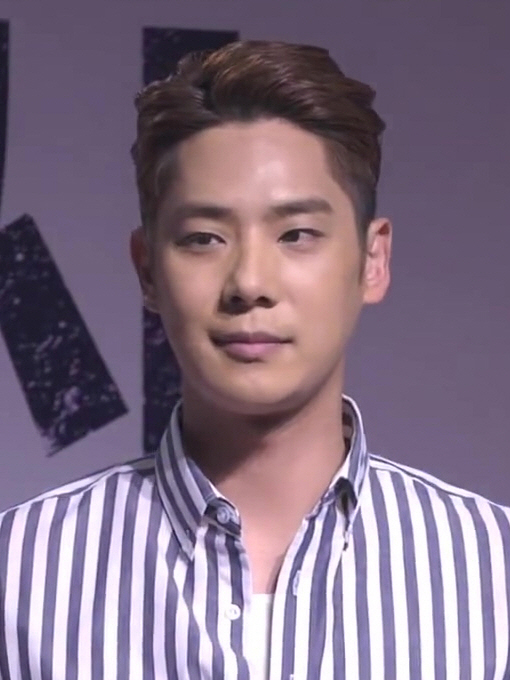
- Born: December 17, 1982 (age 43); Seoul, South Korea
- Other name: RUN
- Occupations: Singer; actor
- Years active: 2000–present
- Agent(s): J & Enterprise

Korean name
- Hangul: 송원근
- Hanja: 宋元根
- RR: Song Wongeun
- MR: Song Wŏn'gŭn

Song Won-geun (Korean: 송원근; born December 17, 1982) is a South Korean singer and actor. Song made his entertainment debut in 2000 as a member of the boyband OPPA, singing in the group's second album Reincarnation. He then launched his career as a solo artist under the stage name RUN (Korean: 런), releasing one album and two singles in 2008 to 2009. Song also began acting in 2010, and has since starred in several stage musicals and television dramas.

== Discography ==
Album information	Track listing
01 (영원..): Single; Released: September 10, 2008; Label: Mnet Media	Track listing: 1. 01 (영원..); 2. 추억; 3. 언젠가; 4. 01 (영원..) (Inst.); 5. 추억 (Inst.); 6. 언젠가 (Inst.)
Fire in My Heart: Album; Released: February 27, 2009; Label: Mnet Media	Track listing: 1. 사고치고 싶어 (feat. Son Dam-bi, Lee Ha-neul) (90's Mix Ver.); 2. 첫 번째 약속; 3. 영원 (01..); 4. 행복의 별 (別); 5. 언젠가; 6. 사고치고 싶어 (Club Mix Ver.); 7. 작은 정류장; 8. 추억; 9. 사고치고 싶어 (feat. Son Dam-bi); 10. 사고치고 싶어 (Club Mix Ver.) (Inst.); 11. 사고치고 싶어 (90's Mix Ver.) (Inst.); 12. 영원 (01..) (Inst.)
Face-Off: Single; Released: October 16, 2009; Label: LOEN Entertainment	Track listing: 1. 강력한 그녀; 2. 그대는 예뻐요 (feat. IU); 3. Sexy Luv; 4. 작은 정류장 (Remix); 5. 강력한 그녀 No. 1; 6. 강력한 그녀 (Inst.)
조금씩 지워가요: Track from A Man Called God OST; Released: April 23, 2010; Label: LOEN Entertainment	Track listing: 04. 조금씩 지워가요
널 부른다 ("I Called You"): Track from Playful Kiss OST; Released: October 20, 2010; Label: Sponge Music Entertainment, Mnet Media	Track listing: 04. 널 부른다
슬픈 바다: Track from King of Mask Singer 복면가왕 14회; Released: July 7, 2015	Track listing 02.슬픈 바다 (오필승 코리아)
내일도 오늘처럼: Track from Victory For Tomorrow OST; Released: January 12, 2016	Track listing 01.내일도 오늘처럼
나 그대에게 모두 드리리: Track from 나 그대에게 모두 드리리; Released: November 23, 2016	Track listing: 1. 나 그대에게 모두 드리리 (Feat. 베이식, 정은우); 2. 나 그대에게 모두 드리리 (Inst.) (Feat. 베이식, 정은우)
뮤지컬 스토리 오브 마이 라이프 OST: Track from The Story of My Life OST; Released: January 16, 2020	Track listing CD 1: 1. 04. 1876; 2. 05. Normal (평범해져); 3. 10. Saying Goodbye (Part 2) (두 번째 이별했을 때); 4. 12. I Like It Here (여기 좋아 난); CD 2: 1. 01. Mrs. Remington (레밍턴 선생님); 2. 02. The Greatest Gift (선물); 3. 06. The Butterfly (나비); 4. 11. This Is It – Angels In The Snow (이게 전부야 – 눈 속의 천사들)

== Filmography ==
=== Television series ===
Year	Title	Role
2013	Princess Aurora	Natasha
2014	A New Leaf	Lee Dong-min (Guest)
2014	Apgujeong Midnight Sun	Jang Moo-eom
2015	Tomorrow Victory	Na Hong-joo (Seo Hong-joo)
2015	High-End Crush	Yoon Ji-won
2017	Strong Girl Bong-soon	Song Won-geun (Guest)
2017	The Bride of Habaek	Secretary Min
2019	Babel	Team Leader Woo

=== Variety show ===
Year	Title	Notes
2009–2010	Let's Go! Dream Team Season 2	Guest, episodes 4, 8, 10, 12
2015	King of Mask Singer 오필승코리아	Guest, episodes 14
2016	Vocal War: God's Voice	Guest, episodes 9
2016	Happy Together Season 3	Guest, episodes 459

== Musical theatre ==
Year	Title	Role
2010	Goong: Musical	Crown Prince Lee Shin
2011	Goong: Musical	Crown Prince Lee Shin
2011	Rent	Roger Davis
2012	Roly Poly of Our Youth	young Young-min
2012	Lovers in Paris	Yoon Soo-hyuk
2012–2013	Finding Kim Jong-wook	Kim Jong-wook/First Love
2013	Arsène Lupin	Isidore Beautrele
2013	Thrill Me	He
2013–2014	Guys and Dolls	Sky Masterson
2014	Black Mary Poppins	Hermann
2014	Thrill Me	He
2015	Musical Talk Concert - "Who am I" 24	
2016	Daddy Long Legs	Jervis Pendleton
2017	Thrill Me 10th Anniversary	He
2017	Daddy Long Legs	Jervis Pendleton
2017-2018	Titanic	Jim Farrell
2018	The Devotion of Suspect X	Yukawa
2018	Daddy Long Legs	Jervis Pendleton
2018-2019	The Story of My Life	Thomas Weaver
2019	Cyrano	Christian
2019	Daddy Long Legs	Jervis Pendleton
2019-2020	The Story of My Life 10th Anniversary	Thomas Weaver
2020	The Story of My Life 10th Anniversary Concert	
2020	Via Air Mail	Pilot Fabien
2020	Aranga	King Gaero
2020	It Rains Cats and Dogs	Raptor
2020-2021	Me, Natasha, and A White Donkey	Poet Baek Seok
2022	Seopyeonje	Dong-ho
2023	Red Book	Brown
2023	The Phantom of the Opera	Raoul
