= Miss Mermaid =

- Promotional poster
- Also known as: Little Mermaid; Mermaid Lady; Story of a Mermaid; Irene
- Genre: Melodrama; Romance; Family; Revenge
- Written by: Im Sung-han
- Directed by: Lee Joo-hwan; Shin Hyun-chang (ep 25-129)
- Starring: Jang Seo-hee; Jung Young-sook; Park Geun-hyung; Han Hye-sook; Woo Hee-jin; Sa Mi-ja; Kim Yong-rim; Kim Byung-ki; Kim Sung-taek; Go Doo-shim; Jeong Bo-seok; Lee Jae-eun; Choi Jae-ho
- Composer: Oh Jin-woo
- Country of origin: South Korea
- Original language: Korean
- No. of episodes: 248

Production
- Executive producer: Lee Jae-kap
- Producer: MBC Drama Division
- Running time: 35 minutes

Original release
- Network: MBC TV
- Release: January 8, 2002 – June 30, 2003

Miss Mermaid (Korean: 인어아가씨; RR: Ineoagassi) is a South Korean television series starring Jang Seo-hee and Kim Sung-taek. It aired on MBC from June 24, 2002 to June 27, 2003 on Mondays to Fridays at 20:20 for 248 episodes.

Miss Mermaid became a nationwide hit upon airing, reaching a peak viewership rating of 43.6%. The cast won several trophies at the 2002 MBC Drama Awards, notably the Daesang ("Grand Prize") for Jang Seo-hee. The series led to Jang's pan-Asian popularity, particularly in China.

But Miss Mermaid was also criticized for Im Sung-han's sensationalistic writing and unrealistic plot twists, as well as the show's multiple extensions.

== Plot ==
Eun Ah-ri-young is a successful television drama screenwriter with a past. Her father Eun Jin-sub had an affair and left their family for the other woman, and shortly after her autistic brother died and her mother Han Kyung-hye went blind. Ah-ri-young's unrelenting hate for her father throughout her childhood and adolescence drives her to meticulously plan her vengeance. Knowing that Jin-sub's new wife Shim Soo-jung is a popular actress, Ah-ri-young works her way up the ranks until she earns enough cachet in the TV industry. Then she writes a script that's a thinly veiled autobiography of her father's affair and its aftermath, and casts the unsuspecting Soo-jung in the role of the blind mother to make her feel guilty. To complete her revenge and cause the maximum amount of pain, Ah-ri-young also plots to steal the fiancé of her half-sister Eun Ye-young, the gentle-natured Lee Joo-wang. Helping Ah-ri-young in her plans is Jo Soo-ah, her mother's friend whose ulterior motive is that she wants Ah-ri-young to marry her son Ma Ma-joon. But Ah-ri-young finds herself falling in love with Joo-wang for real, and she eventually realizes that there is more to life than hatred and learns the true meaning of forgiveness.

== Cast ==
=== Main ===
- Jang Seo-hee as Eun Ah-ri-young, a television screenwriter
- Jung Young-sook as Han Kyung-hye, Ah-ri-young's mother
- Park Geun-hyung as Eun Jin-sub, Ah-ri-young's father, Kyung-hye's ex-husband
- Han Hye-sook as Shim Soo-jung, a famous actress, Jin-sub's wife
- Woo Hee-jin as Eun Ye-young, a reporter, jin-sub and Soo-jung's daughter
- Sa Mi-ja as Geum Ok-sun, Joo-wang's grandmother
- Kim Yong-rim as Geum Sil-ra, Joo-wang's mother
- Kim Byung-ki as Lee Sung-soo, the president of Sun Daily Newspaper, Joo-wang's father
- Kim Sung-taek as Lee Joo-wang, a reporter, Ye-young's fiancé
- Go Doo-shim as Jo Soo-ah a.k.a. Jo Young-chun, a friend of Kyung-hye and Soo-jung
- Jeong Bo-seok as Ma Ma-joon, Soo-ah's son
- Lee Jae-eun as Ma Ma-rin, Soo-ah's daughter
- Choi Jae-ho as An Hyung-sun, a television director

=== Supporting ===
- Seo Kwon-soon as Hong Mi-sung, the mother of Ah-ri-young's ex-boyfriend
- Yoo Hye-ri as herself
- Jeon Mi-seon as Yoon Sung-mi, a reporter who is friend of Ah-ri-young
- Choi Seon-ja as Dong-jin's mother, a housekeeper of the Lee family
- Sa Kang as Yoo Jin-kyung, Ma-rin's friend
- Park Tam-hee as Baek Soo-rim, Mi-sung's ex-daughter-in-law

== Awards ==
2002 MBC Drama Awards

- Daesang (Grand Prize): Jang Seo-hee
- Top Excellence Award, Actress in a Serial Drama: Jang Seo-hee
- Excellence Award, Actress in a Serial Drama: Woo Hee-jin
- Special Acting Award: Han Hye-sook, Jung Young-sook, Park Geun-hyung
- Best New Actor: Kim Sung-taek
- Writer of the Year: Im Sung-han
- Best Couple Award: Kim Sung-taek and Jang Seo-hee
- Viewer's Choice, Actress of the Year: Jang Seo-hee
- Journalists' Choice, Actress of the Year: Jang Seo-hee
