= Get Revenge =

2020 South Korean mystery television series

- Promotional poster
- Also known as: Channel O Hara Revenge; Hera, the Goddess of Revenge
- Hangul: 복수해라
- Hanja: 復讐해라
- RR: Boksuhaera
- MR: Poksuhaera
- Genre: Mystery; Melodrama; Revenge
- Developed by: Jung HHoe-seok
- Written by: Kim Hyo-jin
- Directed by: Kang Min-gu
- Starring: Kim Sa-rang; Yoon Hyun-min
- Country of origin: South Korea
- Original language: Korean
- No. of episodes: 16

Production
- Executive producers: Kang Bo-young; Lee Kyung-sik
- Producers: Jung Hyung-seo; Park Chae-won
- Running time: 70 minute
- Production companies: HIGROUND; Blossom Story; Story Hunter Production

Original release
- Network: TV Chosun; Wavve
- Release: November 21, 2020 – January 17, 2021

Get Revenge (Korean: 복수해라; RR: Boksuhaera) is a 2020 South Korean television series starring Kim Sa-rang and Yoon Hyun-min. The series directed by Kang Min-gu for Chosun Broadcasting Company, is a revenge story of Kang Hae-ra (played by Kim Sa-rang) against those who rule society.

The series was premiered on TV Chosun on November 21, 2020 and was broadcast every Saturday and Sunday at 21.00 KST till January 17, 2021. The first episode of the series logged an average viewership nationwide ratings of 3.4%, peaking to 4.1%. Whereas the second and third episodes logged nationwide viewership ratings of 3.7% with the same peak rating of 4.1%.

== Synopsis ==
It is a mysterious social revenge drama that follows Kang Hae-ra (played by Kim Sa-rang), and her revenge against those who rule society. She is a trendy influencer reporter until a phony scandal ruins her. She vows revenge on those who hurt her.

== Cast ==
=== Main ===
- Kim Sa-rang as Kang Hae-ra, a reporter and influencer. However, due to a false scandal she loses it all, so she aims to take revenge on those who rule society in a corrupt way.
- Yoon Hyun-min as Cha Min-joon, a lawyer who has never lost a single case. After his family is thrown into ruin, he chooses to take revenge no matter what it takes. His sister, Mi-yeon, gets caught in a sponsor scandal and goes missing, and thus he becomes a lawyer rather than a doctor (though while attending medical school he had a 100% win rate) to find his sister.

=== Supporting ===
- Yoon So-yi as Ku Eun-hye, she takes over her father's detective agency. She is devoted to her work and a results-oriented person.
- Yoo Sun as Kim Tae-ohn, the only heir to the "FB" group that does not stop at anything in order to inherit the company. She is a ruthless chaebol.
- Jung Man-sik as Kim Sang-gu, father of Kim Tae-ohn, he is a man who has no affection for his only daughter and only thinks of growing his company.
- Park Eun-hye as Cha Mi-yeon, Min-joon's older sister and former FBC announcer. An incumbent announcer, she is a person who is engulfed by a sponsor scandal, making the broadcaster bustle.
- Jung Wook as Lee Hoon-seok
- Jang Yoo-sang as Choi Do-yoon, Cha Min-joon secretary and his right arm.
- Baek Seung-hee as Song Seon-mi
- Kong Hyun-joo as a reporter
- Jung Eui-jae as Kim Hyun-sung, a news reporter
- Song Joo-hee as Secretary Yeon
- Seo Ye-hwa as Happy Credit person
- Hong Hyun-hee as Director Hong

Special appearance

- Jung Hyeon-jun as Igaon, son of Kang Hae-ra and Lee Hoon-seok who is currently studying in Canada.

== Production ==
In July 2020, Park Eun-hye was confirmed to star in the series. In August 2020, Song Joo-hee was cast in the series.

The first reading of the script took place on October 20, 2020. The crew underlined the theme of the series as: "It is a drama that provides strong one-shot revenge to those who use the weak regardless of means, with the title of "'Revenge" as the strongest."

== Original soundtrack ==
Get Revenge

Soundtrack album by Various Artists
- Released: 21 November 2020
- Genre: Soundtrack
- Languages: Korean; English
- Label: Warner Music Korea

=== Part 1 ===
Released on November 21, 2020
No.	Title	Lyrics	Music	Artist	Length
1.	"No Mind" (드림캐쳐)	ALMOND, PHIL SEUNG BUL PAE	PHIL SEUNG BUL PAE	Siyeon (Dreamcatcher)	3:58
2.	"No Mind (Inst.)"		PHIL SEUNG BUL PAE		3:58
Total length:					7:56

=== Part 2 ===
Released on November 29, 2020
No.	Title	Lyrics	Music	Artist	Length
1.	"At the End" (김채원 (에이프릴))	Yeonho Park	Nara Kim, Hyewon Kim	Kim Chae-won (April)	3:56
2.	"At the End (Inst.)"		Nara Kim, Hyewon Kim		3:56
Total length:					7:52

=== Part 3 ===
Released on December 5, 2020
No.	Title	Lyrics	Music	Artist	Length
1.	"Simple" (초코와 바닐라)	Chocolate and vanilla, NORU (Noru)	Kunyo	Chocolate and vanilla	3:04
2.	"Simple (Inst.)"		Kunyo		3:04
Total length:					6:08

=== Part 4 ===
Released on December 6, 2020
No.	Title	Lyrics	Music	Artist	Length
1.	"Grow up" (VINCIT (빈시트))	Song Gia	Song Gia	VINCIT	3:10
2.	"Grow up (Inst.)"		Song Gia		3:10
Total length:					6:20

=== Part 5 ===
Released on December 12, 2020
No.	Title	Lyrics	Music	Artist	Length
1.	"Invincible" (천승찬)	Sangwon Han	Sangwon Han	Seung-chan Cheon	3:35
2.	"Invincible (Inst.)"		Sangwon Han		3:35
Total length:					7:10

=== Part 6 ===
Released on December 13, 2020
No.	Title	Lyrics	Music	Artist	Length
1.	"I'm sorry, I'm all sorry" (윤현민)	Victory and Defeat, ALMOND	Victory and Defeat	Yoon Hyun-min	3:38
2.	"I'm sorry, I'm all sorry (Inst.)"		Victory and Defeat		3:38
Total length:					7:16

=== Part 7 ===
Released on December 19, 2020
No.	Title	Music	Artist	Length
1.	"I'd rather not know"	LACONIC	Juho	4:28
2.	"I'd rather not know (Inst.)"	LACONIC		4:28
Total length:				8:56

=== Part 8 ===
Released on December 20, 2020
No.	Title	Lyrics	Music	Artist	Length
1.	"In the harsh years"	Unbeatable, 1L2L, ALMOND	Victory and defeat, 1L2L	Kim Joong-yeon
2.	"In the harsh years (Inst.)"		Victory and defeat, 1L2L

=== Part 9 ===
Released on December 27, 2020
No.	Title	Lyrics	Music	Artist	Length
1.	"After breaking up"	Victory invincible, friendly, Mr. Grumpy, ALMOND	Victory invincible, friendly Grumpy's	The Daisy
2.	"Only after breaking up (Inst.)"		Victory invincible, friendly Grumpy's

=== Part 10 ===
Released on January 2, 2021
No.	Title	Lyrics	Music	Artist	Length
1.	"I didn't know that love was like this"	Undefeated, Jamie, ALMOND	Undefeated, Jamie, 1L2L	Nam Yeongju
2.	"I didn't know that love was like this (Inst.)"		Undefeated, Jamie, 1L2L

=== Part 11 ===
Released on January 9, 2021
No.	Title	Lyrics	Music	Artist	Length
1.	"Hug"	Victory invincible, Jamie, ALMOND	Winning Unbeaten Jamie	Park Hyun-seo
2.	"Hug (Inst.)"		Winning Unbeaten Jamie

== Viewership ==
The first episode of the series logged an average nationwide ratings of 3.4% in viewership, peaking to 4.1%.

Get Revenge : South Korea viewers per episode (thousands)

Season	Episode number																Average
Season	1	2	3	4	5	6	7	8	9	10	11	12	13	14	15	16	Average
1	678	733	721	710	683	547	N/A	N/A	607	N/A	N/A	N/A	N/A	N/A	N/A	599	N/A

Source: Audience measurement performed nationwide by Nielsen Korea.

Average TV viewership ratings
Ep.	Part	Original broadcast date	Average audience share (Nielsen Korea)	
Ep.	Part	Original broadcast date	Nationwide	Seoul
1	1	November 21, 2020	2.821% (10th)	2.664% (10th)
1	2	November 21, 2020	3.425% (8th)	3.208% (6th)
2	1	November 22, 2020	2.456% (9th)	2.304% (8th)
2	2	November 22, 2020	3.701% (5th)	3.236% (3rd)
3	1	November 28, 2020	3.025% (11th)	—N/a
3	2	November 28, 2020	3.703% (6th)	3.458% (7th)
4	1	November 29, 2020	2.401% (13th)	—N/a
4	2	November 29, 2020	3.372% (7th)	3.250% (8th)
5	1	December 5, 2020	2.433% (14th)	—N/a
5	2	December 5, 2020	3.311% (9th)	2.9% (10th)
6	1	December 6, 2020	2.074% (17th)	—N/a
6	2	December 6, 2020	2.724% (8th)	2.406% (9th)
7	1	December 12, 2020	2.101% (16th)	—N/a
7	2	December 12, 2020	2.505% (12th)	—N/a
8	1	December 13, 2020	1.468% (N/A)	—N/a
8	2	December 13, 2020	2.023% (17th)	—N/a
9	1	December 19, 2020	2.34% (14th)	2.678% (10th)
9	2	December 19, 2020	2.789% (9th)	2.972% (8th)
10	1	December 26, 2020	2.36% (17th)	—N/a
10	2	December 26, 2020	3.061% (13th)	—N/a
11	1	January 2, 2021	2.32% (17th)	—N/a
11	2	January 2, 2021	2.342% (16th)	—N/a
12	1	January 3, 2021	1.9% (N/A)	—N/a
12	2	January 3, 2021	2.320% (17th)	—N/a
13	1	January 9, 2021	1.9% (N/A)	—N/a
13	2	January 9, 2021	2.212% (17th)	—N/a
14	1	January 10, 2021	2.2%	—N/a
14	2	January 10, 2021	2.192% (21st)	—N/a
15	1	January 16, 2021	2.23% (17th)	—N/a
15	2	January 16, 2021	2.422% (14th)	—N/a
16	1	January 17, 2021	2.52% (12th)	—N/a
16	2	January 17, 2021	2.877% (9th)	2.748% (9th)
Average			2.5%	— (Note: Due to some ratings not recorded, the exact average rating is unknown.)
In the table above, the blue numbers represent the lowest ratings and the red numbers represent the highest ratings.; This drama airs on a cable channel/pay TV which normally has a relatively smaller audience compared to free-to-air TV/public broadcasters (KBS, SBS, MBC and EBS).
