= Leverage (South Korean TV series) =

2019 South Korean television series

- Promotional poster
- Also known as: Leverage: Fraud Control Operation
- Hangul: 레버리지: 사기조작단
- Lit.: Leverage: Con Artists
- RR: Rebeoriji: sagi jojakdan
- MR: Rebŏriji: sagi chojaktan
- Genre: Crime; Drama
- Developed by: TV Chosun
- Written by: Min Ji-hyung
- Directed by: Nam Gi-hoon
- Starring: Lee Dong-gun; Jeon Hye-bin; Kim Sae-ron; Kim Kwon; Yeo Hoe-hyun
- Country of origin: South Korea
- Original language: Korean
- No. of episodes: 16

Production
- Production companies: Production H; Higround; Sony Pictures Television

Original release
- Network: TV Chosun
- Release: October 13 – December 8, 2019

Related
- Leverage (American TV series)

Leverage (Korean: 레버리지: 사기조작단) is a 2019 South Korean television series starring Lee Dong-gun, Jeon Hye-bin, Kim Sae-ron, Kim Kwon and Yeo Hoe-hyun. It is a remake of the show of the same name that aired on TNT in the United States from 2008 to 2012. It aired on TV Chosun from October 13 to December 8, 2019.

== Synopsis ==
The series follows the story of Lee Tae-joon, a former insurance investigator who forms a team of thieves and con artists to target the rich and wealthy. The team was also formed to avenge Tae-joon's son's death.

== Cast ==
=== Main ===
- Lee Dong-gun as Lee Tae-joon, a former principled elite insurance investigator who was once viewed as "Grim Reaper of con artists".
- Jeon Hye-bin as Hwang Soo-kyung, an untalented actress, but a top scammer who is able to speak four languages fluently.
- Kim Sae-ron as Go Na-byul, a former fencing national athlete turned into a top class thief who uses her quick and flexible movements to help swindle people and sneak into places.
- Kim Kwon as Roy Ryu, a security specialist who became a mercenary specializing in various forms of martial arts.
- Yeo Hoe-hyun as Jeong Eui-sung, a hacker who has great digital skills, especially in computers, mobile phones and CCTV.

=== Supporting ===
- Choi Ja-hye as Shin Yu-ri, Tae-joon's wife.
- Park Eun-seok as Min Young-min

=== Others ===
- Hong Seung-hee as Yoo-jin
- Gu Ja-geon as a bodyguard

=== Special appearances ===
- Choi Dae-chul as Jeong Han-gu
- Lee Yong-woo as "Ghost Agent" (Ep. 5–6)
- Jang Gwang as Baek Jong-goo (Ep. 7–8)

== Production ==
The first script reading was held in August 2019 in Yeouido, Seoul, South Korea.

== Ratings ==
| Ep. | Original broadcast date | Average audience share (Nielsen Korea) | |
| Ep. | Original broadcast date | Nationwide | Seoul |
|---|---|---|---|
| 1 | October 13, 2019 | 1.320 | N/A |
| 2 | October 13, 2019 | 1.594 | N/A |
| 3 | October 20, 2019 | 1.269 | N/A |
| 4 | October 20, 2019 | 2.096 | 2.417 |
| 5 | October 27, 2019 | 1.638 | N/A |
| 6 | October 27, 2019 | 2.058 | N/A |
| 7 | November 3, 2019 | 1.407 | N/A |
| 8 | November 3, 2019 | 1.949 | N/A |
| 9 | November 17, 2019 | 2.287 | 2.188 |
| 10 | November 17, 2019 | 2.132 | N/A |
| 11 | November 24, 2019 | 1.617 | N/A |
| 12 | November 24, 2019 | 1.899 | N/A |
| 13 | December 1, 2019 | 1.837 | N/A |
| 14 | December 1, 2019 | 2.236 | N/A |
| 15 | December 8, 2019 | 1.167 | N/A |
| 16 | December 8, 2019 | 1.928 | N/A |
| Average | | 1.777% | — (Note: Due to some unpublished ratings, the exact average rating is unknown.) |
In the table above, the blue numbers represent the lowest ratings and the red numbers represent the highest ratings.; N/A denotes that the rating is not known.; This series aired on a cable channel/pay TV which normally has a relatively smaller audience compared to free-to-air TV/public broadcasters (KBS, SBS, MBC and EBS).
