= Lee Ga-ryeong =

South Korean actress (born 1980)

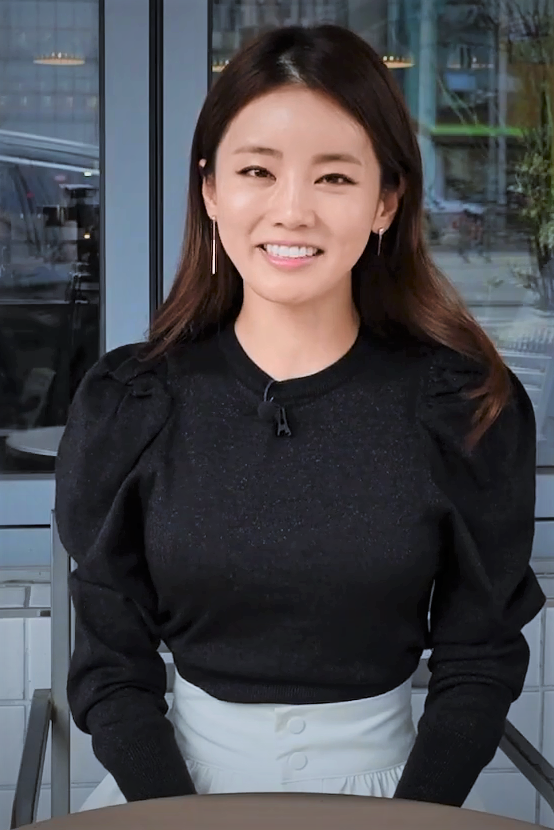
- Lee in 2021
- Born: 2 October 1980 (age 46); Seoul, South Korea
- Other names: Lee Ga-ryung, Lee Ka-ryung, Lee Ka-ryeong
- Occupations: Actress; model
- Years active: 2012–present
- Agent: IOKM

Lee Ga-ryeong is a South Korean actress and model. She is known for her roles in dramas such as Apgujeong Midnight Sun, The Gentlemen of Wolgyesu Tailor Shop, and Monster. She is best known for her role in drama Love (ft. Marriage and Divorce) as Boo Hye-ryung.

== Filmography ==
=== Television series ===
Year	Title	Role	Notes	Ref.
2012	My Husband Got a Family	Yoo Shin-hye's colleague	Episode 39	
2013	Pots of Gold	Customer of cosmetics store	Episode 22	
2013	Master's Sun	Ghost woman victim at Kingdom party		
2013	The Heirs	Clothing store employee	Episode 7 & 20	
2014	Only Love	Head of design department		
2014	Apgujeong Midnight Sun	Ahn Susanna		
2015	Iron Lady Cha	Oh Eun-ji	Main role (48 episodes)	
2016	Monster	Hong Ee-jin		
2016	The Gentlemen of Wolgyesu Tailor Shop	Jo An-na		
2017	Band of Sisters	Chae-rin		
2017	Live Up to Your Name	Gisaeng		
2017	I'm Not a Robot	Young Min-gyoo's mom		
2017	While You Were Sleeping	Hospital administrator	Episode 11 19:15	
2018	The Beauty Inside	Actress		
2019	Liver or Die	Mi-ryeon's production company actress		
2021–2022	Love (ft. Marriage and Divorce)	Boo Hye-ryung	Season 1–3	
2023	Pale Moon	Goo Se-ju		
2025	Queen's House	Kang Se-ri		

=== Television shows ===
Year	Title	Role	Notes	Ref.
2021	I Need Women	Main Cast		
2022	IT Live from Today	Host		

== Ambassadorship ==
- Public Relations Ambassador for the 5th Ulsan Short Film Festival (2022)

== Awards and nominations ==
Name of the award ceremony, year presented, category, nominee of the award, and the result of the nomination
Award ceremony	Year	Category	Nominee / Work	Result	Ref.
APAN Star Awards	2022	Excellence Award – Actress in a Serial Drama	Love (ft. Marriage and Divorce) 2 and 3	Nominated	
Korea Arts and Culture Awards Ceremony	2022	New Star Award	Love (ft. Marriage and Divorce) 3	Won	
