= DNA Lover =

2024 South Korean television series

- Promotional poster
- Hangul: DNA 러버
- RR: DNA reobeo
- MR: DNA rŏbŏ
- Genre: Romantic comedy
- Written by: Jung Soo-mi
- Directed by: Sung Chi-wook
- Starring: Jung In-sun; Choi Si-won; Lee Tae-hwan; Jung Yoo-jin
- Music by: KIm Jang-woo
- Country of origin: South Korea
- Original language: Korean
- No. of episodes: 16

Production
- Executive producer: Jeong Hyung-seo
- Producers: Baek Ji-soo; Hong Seung-chul; Park Kyung-soo; Kim Hee-yeol
- Production companies: Higround; IP Box Media; Pan Entertainment

Original release
- Network: TV Chosun
- Release: August 17 – October 6, 2024

DNA Lover (Korean: DNA 러버) is a 2024 South Korean romantic comedy television series written by Jung Soo-mi, directed by Sung Chi-wook, and starring Jung In-sun, Choi Si-won, Lee Tae-hwan, and Jung Yoo-jin. It aired on TV Chosun from August 17, to October 6, 2024, every Saturday and Sunday at 21:10 (KST). It is also available for streaming on Viu and Viki in selected regions.

== Synopsis ==
Having failed to build multiple numerous romantic relationships, genetic researcher Han So-jin seeks to find her sweetheart through genes.

== Cast and characters ==
=== Main ===
- Jung In-sun as Han So-jin

A researcher at the Beneficial Gene Center who is obsessed with finding the perfect 'genetic match' and is full of otaku traits.

- Choi Si-won as Shim Yeon-woo

A highly capable and sensitive obstetrician and gynecologist at Shim Hospital.

- Lee Tae-hwan as Seo Kang-hoon

A handsome firefighter who always answer So-jin's call.

- Jung Yoo-jin as Jang Mi-eun

A soulmate who understands the cool life of her ex-boyfriend Yeon-woo and a polyamorous romance columnist who claims that "a woman who expects everything from one man is bound to get hurt".

=== Supporting ===
- Lee Si-hoon as Yeo Jeong-tam

An endocrinologist at Shim Hospital and a classmate of Yeon-woo.

- Lee Soo-bin as Son Ah-ri

A researcher at the Beneficial Gene Center and So-jin's colleague and soulmate.

- Bang Eun-jung as Nam Sung-mi

Kang-hoon's firefighter partner and an amateur martial artist known as the Yeoksam-dong Fire Fist.

- Lee Cheol-woo as Father Andrea

A priest who loves and is willing to give up his life for God.

- Park Sung-geun as Shim Sung-hoon

An obstetrician and gynecologist once called the Hand of God and Yeon-woo's father.

- Jeong Min-sung as Seo Hyung-chul

Kang-hoon's father and owner of a sushi restaurant.

- Seo Ji-young as Yoo Myung-hee

So-jin's mother and an installation artist.

- Jung Yi-rang as TBA

A head nurse who works with Yeon-woo and is usually strict but a reliable midwife to pregnant women during childbirth.

== Production ==
=== Development ===
Director Sung Chi-wook, who directed Kairos (2020) and Tomorrow (2022), and writer Jeong Su-mi, who wrote Born Again (2020), teamed up while Higround, IP Box Media and Pan Entertainment managed the production of the series.

=== Casting ===
Choi Si-won and Jung In-sun were reportedly cast to lead the series in November 2023. Lee Tae-hwan was reportedly cast in January 2024, after being discharged from the military in December 2023. Jung Yoo-jin was reportedly cast in February 2024. TV Chosun confirmed the appearances of the four actors in April 2024.

== Release ==
In April 2024, the weekend series was reportedly scheduled to air on TV Chosun in June 2024. Two months later, TV Chosun confirmed that the broadcast date will be on August 17, 2024, every Saturday and Sunday at 21:10 (KST). The series is also available to stream on Viu and Viki.

== Ratings ==
Average TV viewership ratings (nationwide)
Ep.	Original broadcast date	Average audience share (Nielsen Korea)
1	August 17, 2024	1.132% (17th)
2	August 18, 2024	0.62% (42nd)
3	August 24, 2024	0.776% (27th)
4	August 25, 2024	0.757% (35th)
5	August 31, 2024	0.627% (33rd)
6	September 1, 2024	0.578% (42nd)
7	September 7, 2024	0.704% (31st)
8	September 8, 2024	0.644% (37th)
9	September 14, 2024	0.727% (27th)
10	September 15, 2024	0.632% (34th)
11	September 21, 2024	0.609% (33rd)
12	September 22, 2024	0.897% (29th)
13	September 28, 2024	0.555% (36th)
14	September 29, 2024	0.689% (35th)
15	October 5, 2024	0.699% (29th)
16	October 6, 2024	0.798% (32nd)
Average		0.715%
In the table above, the blue numbers represent the lowest ratings and the red numbers represent the highest ratings.; This drama aired on a cable channel/pay TV which normally has a relatively smaller audience compared to free-to-air TV/public broadcasters (KBS, SBS, MBC, and EBS).
