= Apgujeong Midnight Sun =

2014 South Korean television series

- Also known as: Night in Apgujeong; Baek-ya of Apgujeong
- Genre: Melodrama; Romance; Family; Revenge
- Written by: Im Sung-han
- Directed by: Bae Han-chun; Choi Joon-bae
- Starring: Park Ha-na; Kang Eun-tak
- Ending theme: "내 사랑아" by Kan Jongwook lyrics by 제이투 j2 Kan Jong-woo
- Composer: Choi Wan-hee
- Country of origin: South Korea
- Original language: Korean
- No. of episodes: 149 (South Korea); 112 (Vietnam)

Production
- Executive producer: Oh Hyun-chang
- Producer: Kim Ho-young
- Cinematography: Park Sang-ryeol
- Editor: Jo In-young
- Running time: 35 minutes (South Korea); 45-50 minutes (Vietnam)
- Production company: MBC

Original release
- Network: MBC TV
- Release: October 6, 2014 – May 15, 2015

Apgujeong Midnight Sun (Korean: 압구정 백야; RR: Apgujeong baegya) is a 2014 South Korean television series starring Park Ha-na, Kang Eun-tak, Baek Ok-dam and Song Won-geun. The daily drama aired on MBC TV from October 6, 2014 to May 15, 2015 on Mondays to Fridays at 20:55 for 149 episodes.

== Plot ==
The lives of four people (and their families) intersect as they work at a cable TV station, where they learn that a fateful encounter can determine whether a man and a woman will become lovers or enemies.

== Cast ==
- Park Ha-na as Baek Ya / Baek Seon-dong - The female lead, initially she is cruel and jealous to her sister in law but after her brother got into an accident, she learns to love her sister in law and get revenge to her mother, Seo Eun-ha.
- Kang Eun-tak as Jang Hwa-eom
- Baek Ok-dam as Yook Seon-ji - Baek Ya's bestfriend.
- Kim Min-soo as Jo Na-dan (Jonathan) - Seo Eun-ha's stepson, he loves Baek Ya so much.
- Lee Hyo-young as Jung Sam-hee - Hwa-eom's friend and writer
- Song Won-geun as Jang Moo-eom
- Hwang Jung-seo as Jo Ji-ah (Georgia) - Seo Eun-ha's stepdaughter, a typical spoiled brat and arrogant heiress.
- Lee Bo-hee as Seo Eun-ha - Baek Ya's greedy and evil birth mother, money matters to her more than her real children.
- Shim Hyung-tak as Baek Young-joon
- Im Chae-moo as Jang Choo-jang
- Park Hye-sook as Moon Jung-ae
- Jung Hye-sun as Ok Dan-shil
- Kim Ji-eun as Noh Ma-joo
- Han Ki-woong as Kang-ho
- Keum Dan-bi as Kim Hyo-kyung
- Lee Joo-hyun as Yook Seon-joong
- Kim Young-ran as Oh Dal-ran
- Han Jin-hee as Jo Jang-hoon
- Choi Su-rin as Mo-narija
- Oh Ki-chan as Lee Ban-seok
- Kim Eun-jung as Ga-young
- Lee Ga-ryeong as Susanna Ahn

== Controversy ==
In April 2015, the series received scrutiny from the Korea Communications Standards Commission for a revenge storyline that the review board deemed had too many "violent" and "unethical" scenes. Soon after, MBC released a statement that the network would no longer work with screenwriter Im Sung-han in future projects; Im responded by announcing her retirement.

== International broadcast ==
Country	Network(s)/Station(s)	Series premiere	Title	Notes
Thailand	True Asian Series	August 29, 2015	อัพกูจอง ถนนสายชีวิต (Apgujeong Thanon Sai Cheewit, literally: Apgujeong A Road Life)	
Vietnam	VTV3	May 8 – November 19, 2018 (Monday-Thursday at 22:40)	Đêm trắng ở Apgujeong	Edited to 45–50 minutes/episode. Originally planned 116 episodes but actually 112 episodes.
