= Lee Min-young (actress) =

South Korean actress (born 1976)

- Born: February 6, 1976 (age 50); Gwangjin-gu, Seoul, South Korea
- Education: Dankook University – Theater and Film
- Occupation: Actress
- Years active: 1980–present
- Agent: Jidam Media
- Spouse: Lee Chan (m. 2006, divorced)

Korean name
- Hangul: 이민영
- RR: I Minyeong
- MR: I Minyŏng

Lee Min-young (Korean: 이민영; born February 6, 1976) is a South Korean actress. Lee began her career as a child actress when she was four years old, and appeared steadily in television dramas. After a five-year hiatus, she returned to acting in 2011 with Kimchi Family, followed by You're Only Mine in 2014. She is currently represented by the Korean production company Jidam Media.

Lee married actor Lee Chan on December 10, 2006, but the couple divorced after 12 days, with Lee suing her husband for domestic violence that she said caused her miscarriage and a broken nose which required reconstructive surgery. Lee Chan was sentenced to one year in prison, suspended for two years.

== Filmography ==
=== Television series ===
Year	Title	Role	Notes	Ref.
	Ppo Ppo Ppo (Kiss Kiss Kiss)			
1981	Nari House			
1982	Tiger Teacher			
1982	Linger			
1983	500 Years of Joseon: Tree with Deep Roots	Princess Jeongso		
1995	Adolescence	Jae-in		
1995	Partner	Song Hyun-joo		
1995	Woman	Seo Geum-soon		
1996	The Reason We Don't Get Divorced	So-young		
1996	Sibling Relations	Park So-baek		
1996	The Most Beautiful Goodbye in the World			
1997	Medical Brothers	Seo Yoon-kyung		
1997	The Reason I Live	Jung-hee		
1997	Myth of a Hero	Choi Ha-rim		
1998	Run Barefoot	Kang Hyun-ji		
1999	Young Sun	Seo Han-byul		
1999	You're One-of-a-Kind	Lee Eun-sun		
1999	Encounter	Jang Ye-won		
2001	The Rules of Marriage	Song Gong-joo		
2001	The Flower Garden	Han Ki-joon		
2001	More Than Words Can Say	Jang Mi-joo		
2001	Like Father, Unlike Son	Gu Mi-sook		
2002	Zoo People	Yang Min-young		
2002	Kitchen Maid	Kim Soon-young		
2002	Like a Flowing River	Park Dong-hee		
2003	Lovers	Oh Soo-hee		
2004	Precious Family	Woo Mi-yeon		
2004	Toji, the Land	Lady in byeoldang		
2006	Love and Ambition	Eun-hwan		
2011	Kimchi Family	Lee Woo-joo		
2014	You're Only Mine	Go Eun-jung		
2016	The Love Is Coming	Na Sun-young		
2017	Strongest Deliveryman	Soon Ae		
2018	Your House Helper	Ahn Jin-hong		
2019	Hotel del Luna	Ghost (Ep.13)		
2019	Doctor Prisoner	Bok Hye-soo		
2021	L.U.C.A.: The Beginning	Cameo Ep.12		
2021–2022	Love (ft. Marriage and Divorce)	Song Won		
2022	Becoming Witch	Chae Hee-soo		
2022	The Law Cafe	Song-hwa		
2023	Perfect Marriage Revenge	Lee Jong-hye		
2023–2024	Korea–Khitan War	Empress Cheonchu		
2025	First Lady	Shin Hae-rin		

=== Film ===
Year	Title	Role
1980	This Pain of the Woman	
1980	The Wooden Horse That Went to Sea	
	Family Portrait	Soo-kyung

=== Variety show ===
Year	Title	Notes
2012–2013	Popcorn and Nachos	Host
2014	Single Lady	

== Discography ==
=== Soundtrack appearances ===
Title	Year	Album	Ref.
"Don't Worry" (걱정말아요) (with Kang Shin-hyo)	2022	Love (ft. Marriage and Divorce) 3 OST Part 5	

== Awards and nominations ==
Year	Award	Category	Nominated work	Result
1996	MBC Drama Awards	Best New Actress		Won
2014	SBS Drama Awards	Excellence Award, Actress in a Serial Drama	You're Only Mine	Nominated
