= My Happy Ending (TV series) =

2023–2024 South Korean television series

- Promotional poster
- Hangul: 나의 해피엔드
- Lit.: My Happy End
- RR: Naui haepiendeu
- MR: Naŭi haep'iendŭ
- Genre: Psychological drama; Thriller; Mystery
- Developed by: Jung Hoe-seok (planning)
- Written by: Baek Seon-hee
- Directed by: Jo Soo-won; Kim Sang-hoon
- Starring: Jang Na-ra; Son Ho-jun; So Yi-hyun; Lee Ki-taek; Kim Hong-pa; Park Ho-san
- Country of origin: South Korea
- Original language: Korean
- No. of episodes: 16

Production
- Executive producer: Jung Hyeong-seo (CP)
- Producers: Park Chae-won; Jung Chan-hee; Kim Seong-min; Kim Jae-heon
- Production companies: Story Vine Pictures; Higround; IN Culture & Contents (Inster Contents Group)

Original release
- Network: TV Chosun
- Release: December 30, 2023 – February 25, 2024

My Happy Ending (Korean: 나의 해피엔드) is a South Korean television series starring Jang Na-ra, Son Ho-jun, So Yi-hyun, Lee Ki-taek, Kim Hong-pa, and Park Ho-san. It aired on TV Chosun from December 30, 2023, to February 25, 2024 every Saturday and Sunday at 21:10 (KST). It is also broadcast on tvN in selected Southeast Asian countries, and available for streaming on Wavve and Netflix in South Korea, and on Viki and Viu in selected regions.

== Synopsis ==
Seo Jae-won (Jang Na-ra) is fortunate to have a near perfect personal and work life. She is the CEO of a furniture company that makes millions of dollars in sales annually, and she is also a social media influencer with over a million followers. She scouts a designer, Yoon Tae-oh (Lee Ki-taek), to become the general manager of design at her company. In her personal life, Jae-Won has her beloved husband Heo Soon-young (Son Ho-jun) and their lovely child. Soon-young works as a freelancer designer and a professor in industrial design. He is a warm-hearted person who hardly ever bursts out in anger. After their marriage, Soon-Young prioritizes his family over everything else.

Meanwhile, Kwon Yoo-jin (So Yi-hyun) – who graduated from the same art department as Jae-won – is struggling with a difficult divorce with her artistry quickly fading. After reconnecting with Jae-won, she becomes jealous of her somewhat perfect life. However, Jae-won's life changed when Yoo-jin is betrayed by those she trusts and uncovers hidden secrets around her.

== Cast ==
=== Main ===
- Jang Na-ra as Seo Jae-won, the self-taught CEO of a home furniture brand named Derêve.
- Son Ho-jun as Heo Soon-young, Jae-won's husband who is a freelance designer and an industrial design professor.
- So Yi-hyun as Kwon Yoon-jin, Jae-won's art school classmate and an assistant professor at an art school.
- Lee Ki-taek as Yoon Tae-oh/Theo Harris: Jae-won's closest and long-time colleague who is the head of the design team at Derêve.
- Kim Hong-pa as Seo Chang-seok: Jae-won's stepfather.
- Park Ho-san as Nam Tae-joo, an insurance investigator and a former homicide detective.

=== Supporting ===
==== Jae-won's family ====
- Kang Ji-eun as Jung Mi-hyang, Jae-won's mother.
- Choi So-yul as Heo Ah-rin, Jae-won and Soon-young's daughter.

==== Derêve employees ====
- Oh Hyun-joong as Baek Seung-gyu: member of the design team.
- TBA as Kim Seong-hee, Jae-won's secretary.
- TBA as Director Park: the director of Derêve.
- TBA as Team Leader Yoo: IT development team leader.

==== People around Jae-won ====
- Lim Seon-woo as Jo Soo-kyung: a neuropsychiatrist.
- TBA as Reporter Choi: a journalist.

==== Tae-oh's family ====
- TBA as Rachel Harris: Tae-oh's younger sister.

==== Yoon-jin's family ====
- Kim Myung-soo as Kwon Young-ik: Yoon-jin's father who is the chairman of an arts scholarship foundation.

=== Extended ===
- Jung Jin-woo as Detective Lee
- Kim Soo-jin as Detective Oh

=== Special appearances ===
- Na Sang-do as a security guard
- Ahn Sung-hoon as Seung-gyu's friend

== Production ==
The screenplay was first submitted by writer Baek Seon-hee as an entry to the 12th "Find Shooting Stars in the Desert" (사막의 별똥별 찾기; Samagui byeolttongbyeol chatgi), a television screenplay competition organized by the Broadcasting Content Promotion Foundation (BCPF), wherein it was awarded the grand prize of 20 million won. It was greenlit as a series by South Korean production company Higround in February 2023, under its originally titled Happy End (해피엔드; Haepiendeu).

== Viewership ==
My Happy Ending : South Korea viewers per episode (thousands)

Season	Episode number															
Season	1	2	3	4	5	6	7	8	9	10	11	12	13	14	15	16
1	525	432	N/A	N/A	N/A	N/A	N/A	572	496	576	608	611	N/A	565	472	649

Source: Audience measurement performed nationwide by Nielsen Korea.

Average TV viewership ratings
Ep.	Original broadcast date	Average audience share (Nielsen Korea)	
Ep.	Original broadcast date	Nationwide	Seoul
1	December 30, 2023	2.604% (13th)	N/A
2	December 31, 2023	2.330% (9th)	2.066% (9th)
3	January 6, 2024	2.534% (13th)	2.7% (NR)
4	January 7, 2024	2.283% (11th)	2.365% (10th)
5	January 13, 2024	2.485% (12th)	N/A
6	January 14, 2024	2.621% (12th)	2.664% (9th)
7	January 20, 2024	2.595% (11th)	2.638% (10th)
8	January 21, 2024	2.965% (8th)	2.619% (8th)
9	January 27, 2024	2.669% (10th)	2.506% (9th)
10	January 28, 2024	2.684% (9th)	2.716% (7th)
11	February 3, 2024	2.923% (8th)	2.874% (4th)
12	February 4, 2024	2.715% (8th)	2.429% (8th)
13	February 17, 2024	2.331% (14th)	N/A
14	February 18, 2024	2.758% (9th)	2.196% (10th)
15	February 24, 2024	2.408% (11th)	N/A
16	February 25, 2024	2.937% (7th)	2.417% (7th)
Average		2.615%	— (Note: Due to multiple unpublished ratings, the exact average rating is unknown.)
In the table above, the blue numbers represent the lowest ratings and the red numbers represent the highest ratings.; N/A denotes that the ratings were not published.; NR denotes that the series did not rank in the top 10 daily programs on that date.; This series aired on a cable channel/pay TV which normally has a relatively smaller audience compared to free-to-air TV/public broadcasters (KBS, SBS, MBC, and EBS).
