= Becoming Witch =

2022 South Korean television series

- Promotional poster
- Hangul: 마녀는 살아있다
- Lit.: The Witch Is Alive
- RR: Manyeoneun saraitda
- MR: Manyŏnŭn saraitta
- Genre: Black comedy; Mystery
- Developed by: TV Chosun (planning); by Jeong Hwi-seok
- Written by: Park Pa-ran
- Directed by: Kim Yun-cheol
- Starring: Lee Yu-ri; Lee Min-young; Yoon So-yi
- Music by: Lee Kyung-shik
- Country of origin: South Korea
- Original language: Korean
- No. of episodes: 12

Production
- Executive producer: Jeong Hyeong-seo (TV Chosun)
- Producers: Kim Seong-min; Lee Chang-ho; Park Hyo-chang
- Running time: 70 minutes
- Production companies: Hi Ground; JS Pictures; Great Story

Original release
- Network: TV Chosun
- Release: June 25 – September 10, 2022

Becoming Witch (Korean: 마녀는 살아있다) is a South Korean television series starring Lee Yu-ri, Lee Min-young, and Yoon So-yi. It aired on TV Chosun from June 25 to September 10, 2022, every Saturday at 21:10 (KST).

== Synopsis ==
Three women in their 40s reach a breaking point as their already-frustrating lives go completely off the rails.

== Cast ==
=== Main ===
- Lee Yu-ri as Gong Ma-ri

She is a housewife and she has a satisfying life with her husband and daughter. She learns that her husband is having an affair. Gong Ma-ri seeks an alternative method to end her marriage.

- Lee Min-young as Chae Hee-soo

She is a daughter-in-law of a chaebol family. Her marriage life is not going very well. She takes care of her mother-in-law, who is physically unwell and suffers from Alzheimer's. Chae Hee-soo endures her husband's indifference to her and she also experiences difficulties in becoming pregnant. One day, her mother-in-law gives her a terrifying, but tempting offer.

- Yoon So-yi as Yang Jin-a

Her husband is not a good person. Her husband's death leads her to collect a large amount of money from his life insurance policy. With that money, Yang Jin-a is able to live a different life than what she was previously accustomed to. But, she tries to protect her money and suffers from anxiety that her money will be taken away by someone.

- Jung Sang-hoon as Lee Nak-goo

The self-proclaimed celebrity broadcaster suffering from a fever due to the love unexpectedly acquired during their marriage. He wanted a divorce because he wanted to live with love like fate. But he failed every time and took the last resort to end his marriage.

=== Supporting ===
==== People around Gong Ma-ri ====
- Lee Young-ran as Jo Mal-ryun

Gong Ma-ri's mother.

- Kim Ye-gyeom as Lee Suzy

daughter of Gong Ma-ri and Lee Nak-goo.

- Ye Soo-jung as Oh lak-eul

Is the president and advisor of a member botanical coffee shop and form a strange bond with the three women who become witches.

- Park Yoon-hee as Kim Ji-il

Gong Ma-ri's lawyer.

- Kim Hye-hwa as Heo Sook-hee

Oracle Cafe VVIP Membership.

==== People around Chae Soo-hee ====
- Kim Young-jae as Nam Moo-young

An insurance company manager and indifferent husband's pronoun Chae Hee-soo, who suffers a lone illness from her father's deceased mother, is grateful.

- Sung Byun-sook as Park Soon-nyeo

Chae Hee-soo'mother-in-law.

- Kim Hyun-jun as Lee Nam-gyu

A doctor at a fertility clinic and a single father raising a daughter alone.

==== People around Yang Jin-ah ====
- Ryu Yeon-seok as Kim Woo-bin

Used to be a girl's first love. In the neighborhood and ex-husband of Yang Jin-a, he enters the multi-level arena with ambitions following his friend. But in a bad situation of debt, he decided to leave for his wife.

- Kim Sa-kwon as Jang Sang-pil

Co-pilot of a civil aviation aircraft from the Air Force Academy.

==== People around Lee Nak-goo ====
- Han So-eun as Lim Go-eun

A vlogger. He has a bright and endless personality. But she became unmarried early on. Because every man she meets is bad.

- Jung A-mi as Kwak Hye-kyung

Lee Nak-goo's mother and Gong Ma-ri'smother-in-law she is a retired director of education, And she had a problem with an underage son who allowed her to marry Marie, but has an affair and wants a divorce.

=== Extended ===
- Kom Do-gun as Yang Jin-ah's neighbour, a keymaker.
- Lee Won-jong as Natural Person on TV

=== Special appearance ===
- Lee Kyu-han as Jo Doo-chang, Old friend of Yang Jin-ah.

== Viewership ==
Becoming Witch : South Korea viewers per episode (thousands)

Season	Episode number												Average
Season	1	2	3	4	5	6	7	8	9	10	11	12	Average
1	671	471	455	447	395	366	378	N/A	TBD	TBD	TBD	TBD	TBD

Source: Audience measurement performed nationwide by Nielsen Korea.

Average TV viewership ratings
Ep.	Part	Original broadcast date	Average audience share (Nielsen Korea)	
Ep.	Part	Original broadcast date	Nationwide	Seoul
1	1	June 25, 2022	3.417% (1st)	3.500% (1st)
1	2	June 25, 2022	3.282% (4th)	3.312% (2nd)
2	1	July 2, 2022	1.872% (8th)	2.523% (5th)
2	2	July 2, 2022	2.682% (3rd)	—N/a
3	1	July 9, 2022	1.516% (NR)	—N/a
3	2	July 9, 2022	2.480% (8th)	2.277% (8th)
4	1	July 16, 2022	2.003% (11th)	1.849% (10th)
4	2	July 16, 2022	1.894% (NR)	—N/a
5	1	July 23, 2022	1.627% (NR)	—N/a
5	2	July 23, 2022	1.658% (17th)	—N/a
6	1	July 30, 2022	1.611% (15th)	—N/a
6	2	July 30, 2022	1.593% (NR)	—N/a
7	1	August 6, 2022	1.916% (12th)	2.030% (7th)
7	2	August 6, 2022	1.557% (NR)	—N/a
8	1	August 13, 2022	1.647% (18th)	—N/a
8	2	August 13, 2022	1.471% (NR)	—N/a
9	1	August 20, 2022	1.305% (20th)	—N/a
9	2	August 20, 2022	1.199% (NR)	—N/a
10	1	August 27, 2022	1.066% (21st)	
10	2	August 27, 2022	0.789% (NR)	
11	1	September 3, 2022	1.302% (20th)	
11	2	September 3, 2022	1.291% (NR)	
12	1	September 10, 2022	1.0 (NR)	
12	2	September 10, 2022	1.071% (29th)	
Average				
In the table above, the blue numbers represent the lowest ratings and the red numbers represent the highest ratings.; This drama airs on a cable channel/pay TV which normally has a relatively smaller audience compared to free-to-air TV/public broadcasters (KBS, SBS, MBC and EBS).
