= TV Chosun =

South Korean pay television network

TV Chosun TV조선
- Country: South Korea
- Broadcast area: South Korea; Worldwide (via internet)
- Headquarters: Sejongno, Jung District, Seoul, South Korea

Programming
- Language: Korean
- Picture format: HDTV 1080i

Ownership
- Owner: Chosun Ilbo
- Parent: Chosun Broadcasting Co., Ltd.
- Key people: Joo Yong-jung (CEO)

History
- Founded: January 28, 2011; 15 years ago
- Launched: December 1, 2011; 14 years ago

Links
- Website: www.tvchosun.com

TV Chosun
- Native name: TV조선
- Type: Private
- Founded: January 28, 2011; 15 years ago in Seoul, South Korea
- Headquarters: Sejongno, Jung District, Seoul, South Korea
- Area served: Worldwide
- Key people: Kim Min-bae (CEO); Bang Jung-oh (CEO); Bang Sang-hoon (Chairman)
- Revenue: ₩153,172,893,532 (2018)
- Operating income: ₩-1,036,465,441 (2018)
- Net income: ₩3,276,761,531 (2018)
- Total assets: ₩270,716,352,671 (2018)
- Total equity: ₩310,000,000,000 (2018)
- Owner: The Chosun Ilbo (20.0%); Too Capital, LLC (15.0%); Korean Air (9.68%); Booyoung Group (5.50%); Samhung (4.84%)
- Members: 289 (2018)
- Subsidiaries: Chosun Media Rep; Chosun Image Vision; Higround Co., Ltd.
- Website: www.tvchosun.com

TV Chosun (Korean: TV조선; Hanja: TV朝鮮; RR: TVjoseon; MR: TVchosŏn; stylized in all caps) is a South Korean cable network and broadcasting company owned by the Chosun Ilbo-led consortium. The headquarters is located in 40 Sejong-daero 21-gil, Jung-gu, Seoul. It began broadcasting on December 1, 2011.

TV Chosun is one of four new South Korean nationwide generalist cable TV networks alongside JoongAng Ilbo's JTBC, Dong-A Ilbo's Channel A, and Maeil Kyungje's MBN in 2011. The four new networks supplement existing conventional free-to-air TV networks like KBS, MBC, SBS, and other smaller channels launched following deregulation in 1990.

== History ==
- July 22, 2009: Amendment of Media law passed the South Korean national assembly to deregulate the media market of South Korea.
- December 31, 2010: JTBC, TV Chosun, MBN, and Channel A elected as a General Cable Television Channel Broadcasters.
- December 1, 2011: TV Chosun begins broadcasting.
- November 29, 2023: Miss & Mr. Trot Series Signs MOU with Yoshimoto Entertainment related to entering Japan.

== Dramas ==
=== Monday–Tuesday ===
- Korean Peninsula (February 6 – April 3, 2012)

=== Wednesday–Thursday ===
- Operation Proposal (February 8 – March 29, 2012)

=== Friday–Saturday ===
- Into the Flames (April 25 – June 28, 2014)

=== Saturday–Sunday ===
- Ji Woon-soo's Stroke of Luck (April 21 – June 24, 2012)
- Bride of the Century (February 22 – April 12, 2014)
- The Greatest Marriage (September 27 – December 27, 2014)
- A Great Story (March 15 – May 10, 2015)
- Grand Prince (March 3 – May 6, 2018)
- Babel (January 27 – March 24, 2019)
- Joseon Survival Period (June 8 – August 17, 2019)
- Queen: Love and War (December 14, 2019 – February 9, 2020)
- Kingmaker: The Change of Destiny (May 17 – July 26, 2020)
- Get Revenge (November 21, 2020 – January 17, 2021)
- Love (ft. Marriage and Divorce) (January 23 – March 14, 2021)
- Uncle (December 11, 2021 – January 30, 2022)
- Red Balloon (December 17, 2022 – February 26, 2023)
- Durian's Affair (June 24 – August 13, 2023)
- My Happy Ending (December 30, 2023 – February 25, 2024)
- DNA Lover (August 17 – October 6, 2024)
- Confidence Queen (September 9 – October 15, 2025)
- Doctor Shin (March 14 – May 3, 2026)
- I Can't Live Without You (TBA)

==== Saturday ====
- Becoming Witch (June 25 – September 10, 2022)

==== Sunday ====
- Leverage (October 13 – December 8, 2019)

== Variety shows ==
- Taste of Love (2018–2019)
- Mr. Trot (2019–2025)
- Miss Trot (2019–present)
- Romantic Call Centre (2020–2021)
- King of Survival: Tribal War (2024)
- Love Diet (2025–present)

== See also ==
- JTBC
- MBN
- Channel A
- The Chosun Ilbo
