= Jang Seo-hee =

South Korean actress (born 1972)

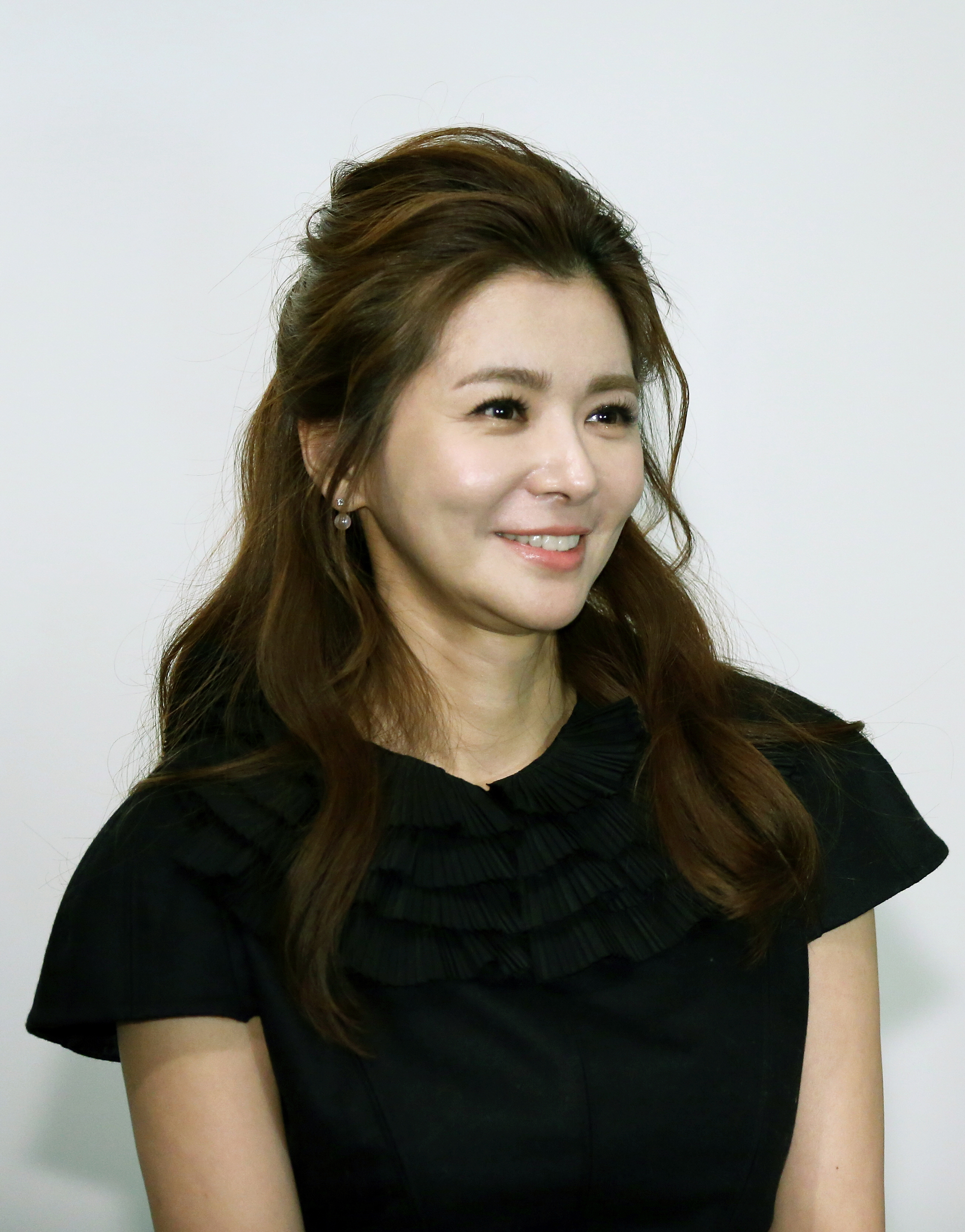
- Jang in 2014
- Born: January 5, 1972 (age 54); Seoul, South Korea
- Education: Kyung Hee University
- Occupation: Actress
- Years active: 1981–present
- Agent: IOK Company
- Height: 1.65 m (5 ft 5 in)

Korean name
- Hangul: 장서희
- Hanja: 張瑞希
- RR: Jang Seohui
- MR: Chang Sŏhŭi

Jang Seo-hee (Korean: 장서희; born January 5, 1972) is a South Korean actress. She has starred in numerous television dramas, including Miss Mermaid (2002) and Temptation of Wife (2008), which were both extremely successful in the ratings and earned Jang the highest acting prize from the MBC Drama Awards and SBS Drama Awards. In a 2007 Chinese survey of the most influential Korean actors, Jang was the highest ranking actress and placed seventh overall.

Jang made her entertainment debut when she won in a 1981 children's beauty pageant, and began her acting career as a child actress and model. She was later appointed as goodwill ambassador for the 2009 Gwangju Design Biennale.

== Filmography ==
=== Films ===
| Year | Title | Role |
|---|---|---|
| 1983 | 3 Days and 3 Nights | |
| 1993 | The Sun Society | |
| 2003 | The Crescent Moon | |
| 2004 | Ghost House | Win-ha |
| 2006 | My Captain Mr. Underground | |
| 2011 | Secrets, Objects | Hye-jung |
| 2017 | It's Okay to be in Middle School | |
| 2023 | Single Friend | Hye-yeong |

=== Television series ===
| Year | Title | Role |
|---|---|---|
| 1994 | Han Myung Hoe | Deposed Queen Yoon |
| 1995 | West Palace | Crown Princess Yoo |
| 1996 | Tears of the Dragon | |
| 1998 | The King and the Queen | |
| 1999 | Hur Jun | Kim In-bin |
| 2000 | Fireworks | Na Hyun-kyung |
| 2000 | Foolish Princes | Kang Hyun-joo |
| 2000 | Taejo Wang Geon | |
| 2001 | Her House | Chae Yeon |
| 2001 | That's Perfect | |
| 2002 | Miss Mermaid | Eun Ah Ri Young |
| 2003 | Merry Go Round | Sung Eun-kyo |
| 2005 | Recipe of Love | Oh Soon-jin |
| 2006 | Geng Zi Feng Yun | Si Qin |
| 2008 | Temptation of Wife | Goo Eun-jae / Min So-hee |
| 2010 | OB & GY | Seo Hye Young |
| 2011 | Master Lin in Seoul | Park Sun-hee |
| 2012 | Heroes of Sui and Tang Dynasties | Zhang Lihua |
| 2014 | Two Mothers | Baek Yeon-hui |
| 2015 | My Mom | Kim Yoon-hee |
| 2017 | Band of Sisters | Min Deul-rae |
| 2022 | Game of Witches | Seol Yu-kyung |
| 2026 | A Trap Called Desire | Joo Mi-ran |

== Accolades ==
=== Awards and nominations ===
| Year | Award | Category | Nominated work | Result |
|---|---|---|---|---|
| 1991 | 27th Baeksang Arts Awards | Best New Actress | That Woman | Won |
| 2002 | MBC Drama Awards | Grand Prize (Daesang) | Miss Mermaid | Won |
| 2002 | MBC Drama Awards | Top Excellence Award, Actress | Miss Mermaid | Won |
| 2002 | MBC Drama Awards | Actress of the Year chosen by journalists | Miss Mermaid | Won |
| 2002 | MBC Drama Awards | Popularity Award, Actress | Miss Mermaid | Won |
| 2002 | MBC Drama Awards | Best Couple Award with Kim Sung-min | Miss Mermaid | Won |
| 2003 | 39th Baeksang Arts Awards | Best Actress – Television | Miss Mermaid | Nominated |
| 2005 | 22nd Korea Best Dresser Awards | Best Dressed of the Year | —N/a | Won |
| 2005 | 42nd Grand Bell Awards | Best New Actress | Ghost House | Nominated |
| 2006 | 1st Asia Model Awards | Hallyu Star Award | —N/a | Won |
| 2006 | 14th Chunsa Film Art Awards | Hallyu Culture Grand Prize | —N/a | Won |
| 2009 | 12th Shanghai International Film Festival | Hallyu Star Award | —N/a | Won |
| 2009 | SBS Drama Awards | Grand Prize (Daesang) | Temptation of Wife | Won |
| 2009 | SBS Drama Awards | Top Excellence Award, Actress | Temptation of Wife | Nominated |
| 2009 | SBS Drama Awards | Top 10 Stars | Temptation of Wife | Won |
| 2010 | SBS Drama Awards | Excellence Award, Actress in a Drama Special | OB & GY | Nominated |
| 2014 | 3rd APAN Star Awards | Top Excellence Award, Actress in a Serial Drama | Two Mothers | Nominated |
| 2014 | KBS Drama Awards | Top Excellence Award, Actress | Two Mothers | Nominated |
| 2014 | KBS Drama Awards | Excellence Award, Actress in a Daily Drama | Two Mothers | Nominated |
| 2014 | KBS Drama Awards | Netizen Award, Actress | Two Mothers | Nominated |
| 2017 | SBS Drama Awards | Top Excellence Award, Actress in a Daily/Weekend Drama | Unni is Alive | Won |
| 2023 | MBC Drama Awards | Top Excellence Award, Actress in a Daily Drama | Game of Witches | Won |
| 2023 | APAN Star Awards | Top Excellence Award, Actress in a Serial Drama | Game of Witches | Nominated |

=== Listicles ===
Name of publisher, year listed, name of listicle, and placement
| Publisher | Year | Listicle | Placement | Ref. |
|---|---|---|---|---|
| Forbes | 2010 | Korea Power Celebrity | 29th | |
