= Kingmaker: The Change of Destiny =

2020 South Korean television series

- Promotional poster
- Hangul: 바람과 구름과 비
- Lit.: Wind, Clouds, and Rain
- RR: Baramgwa gureumgwa bi
- MR: Paramgwa kurŭmgwa pi
- Genre: Period drama; Folklore; Romance
- Based on: Wind, Clouds, and Tombstone by Lee Byung-joo
- Written by: Bang Ji-young
- Directed by: Yoon Sang-ho
- Starring: Park Si-hoo; Ko Sung-hee; Sung Hyuk; Jun Kwang-ryul
- Composer: Lee Chang-hee (music director)
- Country of origin: South Korea
- Original language: Korean
- No. of episodes: 21

Production
- Executive producers: Jeong Hyung-seo; Hwangbo Sang-mi
- Producers: Cho Yoon-jung; Lee Gyeong-sik
- Running time: 70 minutes
- Production companies: Victory Contents; Hi Ground

Original release
- Network: TV Chosun
- Release: May 17 – July 26, 2020

Related
- Wind, Clouds, and Tombstone (1989)

Kingmaker: The Change of Destiny (Korean: 바람과 구름과 비) is a 2020 South Korean television series starring Park Si-hoo, Ko Sung-hee, Sung Hyuk and Jun Kwang-ryul. It is based on the novel Wind, Clouds and Tombstone by Lee Byung-joo and aired on TV Chosun every Saturday and Sunday at 22:50 (KST) starting May 17, 2020.

== Synopsis ==
A story depicting a fierce struggle for the throne in Joseon.

Choi Chun-joong (Park Si-hoo) is the best face reader in the nation. He was born into a prestigious family, but his family was killed off. He is looked down upon as a fortune-teller, but he eventually becomes the most powerful person in Joseon. He is aware of Joseon's fate and tries to change it. He also devotes his life to the woman he loves.

Lee Bong-ryeon (Ko Sung-hee) is a beautiful princess and the daughter of King Cheoljong. She has a special ability to see the fate of people. Her ability is a blessing and, at the same time, a curse to her. Lee Bong-ryeon meets Choi Chun-joong and tries to change the fate of Joseon for the better.

== Cast ==
=== Main ===
- Park Si-hoo as Choi Chun-joong / Choi Mu-myung, Joseon's best fortune teller
  - Kang Tae-woo as young Choi Chun-joong
- Ko Sung-hee as Princess Lee Bong-ryun, King Cheoljong's daughter
  - Hong Seung-hee as young Princess Lee Bong-ryun
- Jun Kwang-ryul as Lee Ha-eung, Prince Heungsun, Gojong's father and an ambitious royal family
- Sung Hyuk as Chae In-kyoo, adopted son of Jangdong Kim clan and Chun-joong's friend
  - Choi Jung-woo as young Chae In-kyu

=== Supporting ===
==== Jangdong Kim clan ====
- Kim Seung-soo is Kim Byung-woon, Kim Jwa-geun's son and his power surpasses the King.
- Cha Kwang-soo as Kim Jwa-geun, Jangdong Kim clan's representative and head.
- Yoon A-jung as Lady Na-hap, Kim Jwa-geun's concubine.
- Han Jae-young as Kim Byung-hak, The core force of the Jangdong Kim clan.

==== Royal Household ====
- Kim Bo-yeon as Dowager Queen Jo

The eldest member in the royal family household. He is the one who holds the key to the next succession to the throne after King Cheoljong's death.

- Jung-Wook as King Cheoljong, the 25th King of Joseon and Lee Bong-ryun's father.
- Eru as Lee Ha-jun, the most likely candidate for succession to the throne.
- Park Sang-hoon as Lee Jae-hwang, Emperor Gojong, Lee Ha-eung's 2nd son and the first emperor of Joseon.
- Park Jung-yeon as Min Ja-young, Empress Myeongseong

A woman with the fate to become a Queen Regnant (여왕). With Chun-joong's help, she deceives Prince Heungsun and then becomes Jae-hwang's primary wife and the first Empress Consort of Joseon.

==== People in Baeogae ====
- Jo Bok-rae as Yong Pal-ryong, Chun-joong's right-hand man and Baeogae's informant.
- Kim Joo-ryoung as Joo-Mo, Baeogae's mistress.
- Han Dong-kyoo is the Equator's truth; the person wearing a red coat and disguised as a wig and beard, she was called the Equator.
- Noh Hyung-wook as Paeng Goo-chul, Joo-Mo's little brother.

== Ratings ==
Kingmaker: The Change of Destiny : South Korea viewers per episode (millions)

| Season | Episode number | | | | | | | | | | | | | | | | | | | | | Average |
| Season | 1 | 2 | 3 | 4 | 5 | 6 | 7 | 8 | 9 | 10 | 11 | 12 | 13 | 14 | 15 | 16 | 17 | 18 | 19 | 20 | 21 | Average |
|---|---|---|---|---|---|---|---|---|---|---|---|---|---|---|---|---|---|---|---|---|---|---|
| 1 | 0.770 | 0.617 | 0.634 | 0.757 | 0.844 | 0.917 | 0.843 | 1.097 | 0.899 | 0.958 | 1.005 | 1.170 | 0.973 | 1.113 | 1.116 | 1.142 | 1.005 | 1.078 | 1.058 | 1.066 | 1.244 | 6.967 |

Source: Audience measurement performed nationwide by Nielsen Korea.

Average TV viewership ratings
| Ep. | Original broadcast date | Average audience share (Nielsen Korea) | |
| Ep. | Original broadcast date | Nationwide | Seoul |
|---|---|---|---|
| 1 | May 17, 2020 | 3.819% | 3.646% |
| 2 | May 23, 2020 | 2.788% | N/A |
| 3 | May 24, 2020 | 3.450% | 2.878% |
| 4 | May 30, 2020 | 3.590% | 3.296% |
| 5 | May 31, 2020 | 4.245% | 3.413% |
| 6 | June 6, 2020 | 4.583% | 4.686% |
| 7 | June 7, 2020 | 4.250% | 4.222% |
| 8 | June 13, 2020 | 5.384% | 5.005% |
| 9 | June 14, 2020 | 4.743% | 4.830% |
| 10 | June 20, 2020 | 4.903% | 4.051% |
| 11 | June 21, 2020 | 5.263% | 4.767% |
| 12 | June 27, 2020 | 6.327% | 5.975% |
| 13 | June 28, 2020 | 4.830% | 4.057% |
| 14 | July 4, 2020 | 5.493% | 5.212% |
| 15 | July 5, 2020 | 5.612% | 5.483% |
| 16 | July 11, 2020 | 5.622% | 5.434% |
| 17 | July 12, 2020 | 4.969% | 4.965% |
| 18 | July 18, 2020 | 4.990% | 5.208% |
| 19 | July 19, 2020 | 5.142% | 5.083% |
| 20 | July 25, 2020 | 5.178% | 4.930% |
| 21 | July 26, 2020 | 5.916% | 5.916% |
| Average | | 4.814% | — (Note: Due to some ratings not recorded, the exact average rating is unknown.) |
In this table, the blue numbers represent the lowest ratings and the red numbers represent the highest ratings.; This drama airs on a cable channel/pay TV which normally has a relatively smaller audience compared to free-to-air TV/public broadcasters (KBS, SBS, MBC and EBS).; N/A denotes that the rating is not known.
