= Princess Aurora (TV series) =

- Promotional poster
- Also known as: Aurora, the Princess
- Genre: Melodrama; Romance; Comedy
- Written by: Im Sung-han
- Directed by: Kim Jung-ho; Jang Joon-ho
- Starring: Jeon So-min; Oh Chang-seok
- Ending theme: "좋아좋아" by 베이지, "뒤돌아 보지마" by 최영, "살고싶어" by 서하준, 오창석 all lyrics by j2 Kan Jong-woo
- Composer: Choi Wan-hee
- Country of origin: South Korea
- Original language: Korean
- No. of episodes: 150

Production
- Executive producers: Kim Sa-hyun; Teddy Hoon-tak Jung
- Producer: Oh Seung-yeol
- Cinematography: Park Jung-hyun
- Editor: Han Seong-cheol
- Running time: 30 minutes
- Production company: iHQ

Original release
- Network: Munhwa Broadcasting Corporation
- Release: May 8 – December 20, 2013

Princess Aurora (Korean: 오로라 공주; RR: Orora gongju) is a 2013 South Korean television series starring Jeon So-min, Oh Chang-seok, Seo Ha-joon, Park Yeong-gyu, Son Chang-min, Oh Dae-gyu, Kim Bo-yeon, Park Hae-mi, Kim Hye-eun, Lim Hyuk, and Kim Young-ran. The daily drama aired on MBC from May 8, 2013, to December 20, 2013.

== Plot ==
Oh Ro-Ra is a 25-year-old woman whose family owns Chunwang Foods. As the youngest child of a wealthy family, Ro-Ra is charming, confident, and materialistic. The series is centered around Ro-Ra salvaging the second marriage of her 50-year-old brother.

== Cast ==
=== Aurora's family ===
- Jeon So-min as Oh Ro-ra (Aurora)
- Park Yeong-gyu as Oh Wang-sung
- Son Chang-min as Oh Geum-sung
- Oh Dae-gyu as Oh Soo-sung
- Byun Hee-bong as Oh Dae-san
- Seo Woo-rim as Sa Im-dang
- Lee Sang-sook as Jang Yun-shil
- Lee Ah-hyun as Lee Kang-sook
- Lee Hyun-kyung as Kim Sun-mi
- Oh Chang-seok as Hwang Ma-ma

=== Others ===
- Choi Hyo-eun as Lee-jeong
- Kim Hee-jung as Eun-ha (cameo)

== Controversy ==
During its run, Princess Aurora became a fixture in the entertainment news headlines for both its over-the-top (called makjang in Korean) storylines and behind-the-scenes troubles.

On the 39th episode, the characters Oh Geum-sung and Oh Soo-sung (older brothers of the female protagonist) suddenly left for the United States to visit their wives. This meant that they were essentially written off the show. The actors playing them, Son Chang-min and Oh Dae-gyu, complained to the network that they weren't informed in advance of this development, and neither were their agencies; everyone, including the drama crew, only found out when they received the script before the scenes were to be filmed. This was reportedly writer Im Sung-han's decision: the actors had previously expressed their concerns to her about the storytelling's direction. The Korean press used the term "cast kill" to refer to the tendency of Im's past dramas (such as Dear Heaven, Assorted Gems, New Tales of Gisaeng) to abruptly kill off characters. In terms of production logistics, the fired actors still received the agreed-upon fixed salary for the duration of the series, regardless of screen time. However, Im's move had possible legal ramifications, and she was criticized for unprofessionalism, since the actors signed on to the drama (and turned down other offers) with the expectation that their roles would be prominent.

As the show went on, Im wrote out more actors (more than 12 in total), resulting in a reportedly deteriorating atmosphere on set and notoriety in the press. With some characters killed off unceremoniously, viewers dubbed the series "Im Sung-han's Death Note," culminating in the death of male protagonist Hwang Ma-ma (played by Oh Chang-seok). Dissatisfaction with Im mounted when it became known that one of the cast members, Baek Ok-dam, is her niece. Netizens charged Im with nepotism when Baek's role was expanded in the wake of the firing of other cast members.

Princess Aurora also received warnings from the Korea Communications Standards Commissions, which cited the drama's "multiple immoral storylines and crude language" as violations of its standards. It was sanctioned for material unsuitable for younger audiences, since it aired in the early evening at 19:15.

As ratings continued to climb, the initially 120-episode drama received a 30-episode extension, bringing its final episode count to 150. However, Im asked for 50 additional episodes (in order to bring up the final count to 200), stating that she needed the additional time to flesh out her storylines. Calling the series "an insult to viewers' intelligence," viewers then organized a petition to protest the extension and demanded that Im be fired from the show. After it was leaked that Im was being paid ₩30 million (US$30,000) per episode (nearly ₩5 billion or US$5 million in total), the petition gained further traction; the initial goal was to collect 1,000 signatures, but the petition ultimately ended up with over 20,000. MBC eventually decided to end the series at 150 episodes, but retained Im as writer (although the network demanded rewrites of the final two episodes). On December 11, 2013, Im posted a message on the show's website, "thanking netizens and reporters for their constancy in pointing out her flaws, and hoped that they would once again note her failings."

== Awards and nominations ==
Year	Award	Category	Recipient	Result
2013	2nd APAN Star Awards	Best New Actor	Oh Chang-seok	Nominated
2013	32nd MBC Drama Awards	Drama of the Year	Princess Aurora	Nominated
2013	32nd MBC Drama Awards	Golden Acting Award, Actress	Kim Bo-yeon	Won
2013	32nd MBC Drama Awards	Golden Acting Award, Actress	Park Hae-mi	Nominated
2013	32nd MBC Drama Awards	Best New Actor	Oh Chang-seok	Won
2013	32nd MBC Drama Awards	Best New Actress	Jeon So-min	Won
2014	7th Korea Drama Awards	Excellence Award, Actress	Jeon So-min	Nominated
