= Queen: Love and War =

2019–2020 South Korean TV series

- Promotional poster
- Hangul: 간택 – 여인들의 전쟁
- Hanja: 揀擇 – 女人들의 戰爭
- Lit.: Royal Bride Selection: The War Between Women
- RR: Gantaek – yeoindeurui jeonjaeng
- MR: Kant'aek – yŏindŭrŭi chŏnjaeng
- Genre: Historical; Fantasy; Romance
- Developed by: TV Chosun
- Written by: Choi Soo-mi
- Directed by: Kim Jung-min
- Starring: Jin Se-yeon; Kim Min-kyu; Do Sang-woo; Lee Yul-eum; Lee Si-eon
- Composer: Lee Ji-yong
- Country of origin: South Korea
- Original language: Korean
- No. of episodes: 16

Production
- Running time: 70 minutes
- Production companies: Higround; KORTOP Media

Original release
- Network: TV Chosun
- Release: December 14, 2019 – February 9, 2020

Queen: Love and War (Korean: 간택 – 여인들의 전쟁) is a 2019 South Korean television series starring Jin Se-yeon, Kim Min-kyu, Do Sang-woo, Lee Yul-eum, and Lee Si-eon. This series was aired on TV Chosun every Saturday and Sunday at 22:50 KST from December 14, 2019, to February 9, 2020. The series is also available for exclusive streaming on iQIYI for selected regions.

== Synopsis ==
Kang Eun-Ki (Jin Se-yeon) becomes the Queen of Joseon. During their Wedding Day Parade, Eun-Ki and Lee Kyung (Kim Min-kyu) are ambushed and shot by assassins. Both Royals are assumed to have been killed, however, the night after the bullet is removed from the king's head and he is laid to rest under the guard of the priestesses, the dead king resurrects while Kang Eun-Ki's twin sister, Kang Eun-bo, is acting under the guise of an assistant to the Chief Priestess to gain answers about the murderers.

Assuming the King's death, the Great Queen Dowager Min (Jung Ae-ri) is presented with a candidate for a new King by the Left State Minister, Jo Heung-Gyeon (Lee Jae-yong) who embarks immediately to retrieve the exiled Prince Lee Jae-Hwa (Do Sang-woo). Upon their return to the palace, the Left State Minister and Prince are both shocked and angry to learn that the king is still alive and recovering, but cover it well and go their separate ways. The father of the dead queen, Kang Yi-Soo (Lee Ki-young) due to the politics in the palace is accused of treason after having been discovered for writing the Theory of Enlightenment and indoctrinating his daughter. Lee Kyung doesn't believe the conspiracy and attempts to save Kang Yi-Soo with a secret jailbreak that ends up ruined by another member of the court. Kang Yi-Soo swears his loyalty to Lee Kyung in the end and chooses to accept the sentence of death by hanging to save Lee Kyung from any further political battle.

Unable to find the Queen's murderers in time or clear their father's name Kang Eun-Bo is helpless to watch in the crowd of spectators, Kang Yi-soo notices her in the crowd in his final moments and smiles at her. Taking a chance at revenge Eun-Bo goes to Kang Yi-Soo's closest friend and the only person outside their family who knew about the twin daughters, Baek Ja-Yong (Um Hyo-sup) she recklessly demands to know of any way to kill the king. He takes her in to recover from her grief and later reveals Kang Yi-Soo's vision to her and promises that he will help Eun-Bo see her mother again if she can help him take revenge on the king for the death of her father. Longing to see her last remaining family, she agrees and becomes caught in the middle of discovering who is responsible for the death of her sister and father. The palace begins to look for a new queen for Lee Kyung to calm down the unrest in the court and any rumors concerning the king's behavior after his resurrection. With anger and determination to find the mastermind behind the murder of her twin sister, Eun-bo participates in the selection under the name Hong-yeon, daughter of Gyeong-gi Governor Hong Ki-ho.

Lee Kyung begins to have vivid dreams, precognition due to which he is able to predict what may happen to Eun-bo in the near future. What does the palace hold for Eun-bo? Will she be able to win the selection and capture the assassins?

== Cast ==
=== Main ===
- Jin Se-yeon as Kang Eun-bo / Kang Eun-Ki
  - Choi Myung-bin as young Kang Eun-bo / Kang Eun-Ki
- Kim Min-kyu as Lee Kyung
  - Park Min-su as young Lee Kyung
- Do Sang-woo as Lee Jae-hwa
- Lee Yul-eum as Jo Young-ji
- Lee Si-eon as Wal
  - Gil Jung-woo as young Wal

=== Supporting ===
==== People around Kang Eun-bo ====
- Um Hyo-sup as Baek Ja-yong
- Lee Yoon-gun as Hong Ki-ho, Governor of Gyeong-gi Province; Minister of Justice
- Lee Ki-young as Kang Yi-soo, Eun-gi and Eun-bo's father
- Choo Soo-bin as Yeo-wul, Eun-bo's lady-in-waiting and confidant.
- Lee Kan-hee as Lady Han, Eun-gi and Eun-bo's mother

==== People around Lee Kyung ====
- Kim Bum-jin as Han Mo
- Ahn Se-ha as Eunuch Hwang

==== People around Jo Young-ji ====
- Lee Jae-yong as Jo Heung-gyeon, father of Jo Young-ji; Left State Councillor
- Choi Na-moo as Byeo-ri, Jo Young-Ji's maid

==== People inside the Palace ====
- Jung Ae-ri as Great Queen Dowager Min, grandmother of Lee Kyung
- Jo Eun-sook as Queen Mother Kim, mother of Lee Kyung

==== Andong Kim Clan ====
- Son Byong-ho as Kim Man-chan; Prime Minister
- Lee Hwa-kyum as Kim Song-yi, Hyung-chan's daughter
- Yoon Ki-won as Kim Hyung-chan

==== Others ====
- Jo Mi-nyeo as Bang Ye-sil
- Song Ji-woo as Jong-Hee
- Go Yoon as Gae-pyung
- Kim Joo-yeong as Ha Dan-yeong
- Kwon Jae-hwan as Kwon Ik-soo
- Jang Seong-yun as Hong-yeon, Governor Hong Ki-ho's daughter
- Kim Sung-bum as Gi-chil, Uigeumbu's officer
- Ha Eun-jin as Cho-hyang, a gisaeng
- Seo Kyung-hwa as Court Lady Jeong, Great Queen Dowager Min's lady in-waiting
- Lee Joo-jin as Uigeumbu's officer
- Kim Jae-il as Il-won
- Hong Seong-Sook as Seongsucheong's shaman
- Han Da-mi as a court lady who serve Andong Kim's family
- Kim Young-ah as Eun-bo's court lady who works under Kim Song-Yi; but for the last time, she helps Eun-bo sincerely

== Original soundtrack ==
Queen: Love and War OST

Soundtrack album by Various Artists
- Released: 2019–2020
- Genre: Soundtrack
- Language: Korea
- Labels: Warner Music Korea; KP Sound

=== Part 1 ===
Release date: December 15, 2019
No.	Title	Lyrics	Music	Singer	Length
1.	"Cold Wind" (찬바람결에 흩어져 가듯이)	Lee Ji-yong; Oaro	Mad Finger; Oaro	Sojung (Ladies' Code)	3:17
2.	"Cold Wind" (Inst.)		Mad Finger; Oaro		3:17
Total length:					6:34

=== Part 2 ===
Release date: December 21, 2019
No.	Title	Lyrics	Music	Singer	Length
1.	"Time, Please" (시간아 제발)	Kim Won	Kim Won	Kim Kyung-rok (V.O.S)	4:05
2.	"Time, Please" (Inst.)		Kim Won		4:05
Total length:					9:10

=== Part 3 ===
Release date: December 29, 2019
No.	Title	Lyrics	Music	Singer	Length
1.	"The Last Time" (마지막이라고)	Victory (필승불패); Jar (항아리)	Victory (필승불패); Laconic	Jung Yi-han (The Nuts)	3:57
2.	"The Last Time" (Inst.)		Victory (필승불패); Laconic		3:57
Total length:					7:54

=== Part 4 ===
Release date: January 4, 2020
No.	Title	Lyrics	Music	Singer	Length
1.	"Goodbye Shade" (이별그늘)	Victory (필승불패); Jar (항아리)	Victory (필승불패); 1L2L	The Brothers	3:52
2.	"Goodbye Shade" (Inst.)		Victory (필승불패); 1L2L		3:52
Total length:					7:44

=== Part 5 ===
Release date: January 11, 2020
No.	Title	Lyrics	Music	Singer	Length
1.	"Sick Love" (사랑아 아픈 사랑아)	Victory (필승불패); Jar (항아리)	Victory (필승불패); Laconic	12DAL	3:20
2.	"Sick Love" (Inst.)		Victory (필승불패); Laconic		3:20
Total length:					6:40

=== Part 6 ===
Release date: January 18, 2020
No.	Title	Lyrics	Music	Singer	Length
1.	"Come" (잠깐 나와줄래)	Victory (필승불패); Yook Sang-hui; Jar (항아리)	Victory (필승불패); Yook Sang-hui; 1L2L	Ki Hyun	3:24
2.	"Come" (Inst.)		Victory (필승불패); Yook Sang-hui; 1L2L		3:24
Total length:					6:48

=== Part 7 ===
Release date: January 25, 2020
No.	Title	Lyrics	Music	Singer	Length
1.	"Farewell" (그까짓 이별)	Victory (필승불패); Yook Sang-hui; Jar (항아리)	Victory (필승불패); Yook Sang-hui; Lee Dong-young	Baek Sun-nyeo	3:40
2.	"Farewell" (Inst.)		Victory (필승불패); Yook Sang-hui; Lee Dong-young		3:40
Total length:					7:20

=== Part 8 ===
Release date: February 1, 2020
No.	Title	Lyrics	Music	Singer	Length
1.	"You Can't Turn Around Like This" (이렇게 돌아서면 안돼요)	Victory (필승불패); Jar (항아리)	Victory (필승불패); 1L2L	CherryBerry	3:32
2.	"You Can't Turn Around Like This" (Inst.)		Victory (필승불패); 1L2L		3:32
Total length:					7:04

=== Part 9 ===
Release date: February 8, 2020
No.	Title	Lyrics	Music	Singer	Length
1.	"I Can't Believe It" (나 믿기지 않아)	Victory (필승불패); Jamie; Jar (항아리)	Victory (필승불패); Jamie; 1L2L	Lee Shi-eun	3:13
2.	"I Can't Believe It" (Inst.)		Victory (필승불패); Jamie; 1L2L		3:13
Total length:					6:26

== Viewership ==
Queen: Love and War : South Korea viewers per episode (thousands)

Season	Episode number																Average
Season	1	2	3	4	5	6	7	8	9	10	11	12	13	14	15	16	Average
1	527	615	511	637	762	846	722	916	751	882	647	805	1004	1027	823	1364	802

Source: Audience measurement performed nationwide by Nielsen Media Research.

Average TV viewership ratings
Ep.	Original broadcast date	Average audience share (AGB Nielsen)	
Ep.	Original broadcast date	Nationwide	Seoul
1	December 14, 2019	2.557% (7th)	2.668% (6th)
2	December 15, 2019	2.873% (4th)	2.779% (5th)
3	December 21, 2019	2.556% (7th)	2.436% (6th)
4	December 22, 2019	3.642% (2nd)	3.537% (2nd)
5	January 4, 2020 (Note: No episodes aired on December 28 and 29. Ep.5 & 6 did not air during the December 28–29, 2019 weekend. Instead, re-airings of ep.1-4 took its place. Ep.5 & 6 aired on Saturday, January 4, 2020 and Sunday, January 5, 2020, respectively .)	3.328% (8th)	3.011% (8th)
6	January 5, 2020	4.266% (4th)	4.605% (3rd)
7	January 11, 2020	3.355% (8th)	3.082% (8th)
8	January 12, 2020	4.143% (5th)	4.206% (5th)
9	January 18, 2020	3.986% (7th)	4.219% (6th)
10	January 19, 2020	4.248% (4th)	4.323% (4th)
11	January 25, 2020	2.846% (10th)	3.037% (8th)
12	January 26, 2020	4.075% (4th)	4.358% (3rd)
13	February 1, 2020	4.537% (5th)	4.403% (5th)
14	February 2, 2020	4.577% (3rd)	4.270% (3rd)
15	February 8, 2020	4.237% (6th)	3.975% (6th)
16	February 9, 2020	6.348% (1st)	5.924% (1st)
Average		3.848%	3.802%
In this table, the blue numbers represent the lowest ratings and the red numbers represent the highest ratings.; This drama airs on a cable channel/pay TV which normally has a relatively smaller audience compared to free-to-air TV/public broadcasters (KBS, SBS, MBC and EBS).
