= 2019 KBS Drama Awards =

33rd edition of award ceremony

- Date: December 31, 2019
- Site: KBS Hall, Yeouido, Seoul
- Hosted by: Jun Hyun-moo; Shin Hye-sun

Television coverage
- Network: KBS2, KBS World

The 2019 KBS Drama Awards, presented by Korean Broadcasting System (KBS), was held on December 31, 2019 at KBS Hall in Yeouido, Seoul. It was hosted by Jun Hyun-moo and Shin Hye-sun. Brown Eyed Girls were main performers at the event.

== Winners and nominees ==
(Winners denoted in bold)

Grand Prize (Daesang)
**Gong Hyo-jin** – **When the Camellia Blooms**
| Top Excellence Award, Actor | Top Excellence Award, Actress |
| **Kang Ha-neul** – **When the Camellia Blooms**; **Yoo Jun-sang** – **Liver or Die**; Namkoong Min – Doctor Prisoner; Park Shin-yang – My Lawyer, Mr. Jo 2: Crime and Punishment; Son Hyun-joo – Justice | **Cho Yeo-jeong** – **Woman of 9.9 Billion**; **Shin Hye-sun** – **Angel's Last Mission: Love**; Gong Hyo-jin – When the Camellia Blooms; Go Doo-shim – When the Camellia Blooms; Go Hyun-jung – My Lawyer, Mr. Jo 2: Crime and Punishment; Kim Hae-sook – Mother of Mine |
| Excellence Award, Actor in a Miniseries | Excellence Award, Actress in a Miniseries |
| **Choi Won-young** – **Doctor Prisoner**; **Jang Dong-yoon** – **The Tale of Nokdu**; Choi Jin-hyuk – Justice; Kim Kang-woo – Woman of 9.9 Billion; Kim Myung-soo – Angel's Last Mission: Love; Namgoong Min – Doctor Prisoner; Shin Sung-rok – Perfume; Son Hyun-joo – Justice | **Kim So-hyun** – **The Tale of Nokdu**; **Nana** – **Justice**; Cho Yeo-jeong – Woman of 9.9 Billion; Kim Se-jeong – I Wanna Hear Your Song; Ko Won-hee – Perfume; Kwon Nara – Doctor Prisoner; Shin Hye-sun – Angel's Last Mission: Love |
| Excellence Award, Actor in a Mid-length Drama | Excellence Award, Actress in a Mid-length Drama |
| **Kim Ji-seok** – **When the Camellia Blooms**; **Choi Si-won** – **My Fellow Citizens!**; Kang Ha-neul – When the Camellia Blooms; Park Shin-yang – My Lawyer, Mr. Jo 2: Crime and Punishment; Yoo Jun-sang – Liver or Die | **Lee Jung-eun** – **When the Camellia Blooms**; **Lee Si-young** – **Liver or Die**; Gong Hyo-jin – When the Camellia Blooms; Go Doo-shim – When the Camellia Blooms; Go Hyun-jung – My Lawyer, Mr. Jo 2: Crime and Punishment; Lee Yoo-young – My Fellow Citizens! |
| Excellence Award, Actor in a Serial Drama | Excellence Award, Actress in a Serial Drama |
| **Ki Tae-young** – **Mother of Mine**; **Oh Min-suk** – **Beautiful Love, Wonderful Life**; Hong Jong-hyun – Mother of Mine; Yoon Park – Beautiful Love, Wonderful Life | **Kim So-yeon** – **Mother of Mine**; **Seol In-ah** – **Beautiful Love, Wonderful Life**; Jo Yoon-hee – Beautiful Love, Wonderful Life; Kim Hae-sook – Mother of Mine; Kim Mi-sook – Beautiful Love, Wonderful Life |
| Excellence Award, Actor in a Daily Drama | Excellence Award, Actress in a Daily Drama |
| **Kim Jin-woo** – **Left-Handed Wife**; **Seol Jung-hwan** – **Unasked Family**; Kim Heung-soo – Gracious Revenge; Oh Chang-seok – A Place in the Sun; Yoon Sun-woo - Home for Summer | **Cha Ye-ryun** – **Gracious Revenge**; **Lee Young-eun** – **Home for Summer**; Choi Yoon-so – Unasked Family; Lee Soo-kyung – Left-Handed Wife; Yoon So-yi – A Place in the Sun |
| Best Actor in a One-Act/Special/Short Drama | Best Actress in a One-Act/Special/Short Drama |
| **Jung Dong-hwan** – **Drama Special – Live Like That**; **Lee Do-hyun** – **Drama Special – Scouting Report**; Choi Won-young – Drama Special – Scouting Report; Lee Tae-sun – Drama Special – Wreck Car; Park Eun-seok – Drama Special – Clean and Polish; Song Geon-hee – Birthday Letter; Tae Hang-ho – Drama Special – Rural Outcasts | **Lee Joo-young** – **Drama Special – Home Sweet Home**; **Jo Soo-min** – **Birthday Letter**; Kim Ga-eun – Drama Special – Goodbye B1; Na Hye-mi – Drama Special – Clean and Polish; Ryu Hyun-kyung – Drama Special – Hidden; Shin Do-hyun – Drama Special – Socialization – Understanding of Dance |
| Best New Actor | Best New Actress |
| **Kang Tae-oh** – **The Tale of Nokdu**; **Kim Jae-young** – **Beautiful Love, Wonderful Life**; **Kim Myung-soo** – **Angel's Last Mission: Love**; Cha Seo-won – Liver or Die; Jung Joon-won – My Lawyer, Mr. Jo 2, Drama Special – Goodbye B1; Park Eun-seok – Doctor Prisoner, Drama Special – Clean and Polish | **Kwon Nara** – **Doctor Prisoner**; **Son Dam-bi** – **When the Camellia Blooms**; Jo Woo-ri – Beautiful Love, Wonderful Life; Jung Yoo-min – Unasked Family; Kim Ha-kyung – Mother of Mine; Lee Yoo-young – My Fellow Citizens; Nana – Justice |
| Best Supporting Actor | Best Supporting Actress |
| **Oh Jung-se** – **When the Camellia Blooms**; **Jung Woong-in** – **Woman of 9.9 Billion**; **Kim Byung-chul** – **Doctor Prisoner**; Choi Dae-chul – Liver or Die, When the Camellia Blooms; Jang Hyun-sung – Doctor Prisoner; Jeon Bae-soo – When the Camellia Blooms, Drama Special – Wreck Car; Jung Joon-ho – The Tale of Nokdu | **Ha Jae-sook** – **Perfume**; **Kim Jung-nan** – **Doctor Prisoner**; **Shin Dong-mi** – **Liver or Die**; **Yeom Hye-ran** – **When the Camellia Blooms**; Kim Sun-young – When the Camellia Blooms, Drama Special – Socialization – Understanding of Dance; Na Hye-mi – Home for Summer, Drama Special – Clean and Polish |
| Best Young Actor | Best Young Actress |
| **Kim Kang-hoon** – **When the Camellia Blooms**; Choi Seung-hun – A Place in the Sun; Kim Ji-hoon – Unasked Family; Go Woo-rim – Angel's Last Mission: Love; Song Min-jae – Home for Summer | **Joo Ye-rim** – **Mother of Mine**; **Park Da-yeon** – **The Tale of Nokdu**; Kim Dan-woo – When the Camellia Blooms; Kim Soo-in – Drama Special – Rural Outcasts; Seo Yi-soo – When the Camellia Blooms |
| Netizen Award | Best Couple Award |
| **Kang Ha-neul** – **When the Camellia Blooms** | **Jang Dong-yoon** and **Kim So-hyun** – **The Tale of Nokdu**; **Jang Hyun-sung** and **Kim Jung-nan** – **Doctor Prisoner**; **Kang Ha-neul** and **Gong Hyo-jin** – **When the Camellia Blooms**; **Kim Myung-soo** and **Shin Hye-sun** – **Angel's Last Mission: Love**; **Oh Jung-se** and **Yeom Hye-ran** – **When the Camellia Blooms**; **Yoo Jun-sang** and **Shin Dong-mi** – **Liver or Die** |
| K-Drama Hallyu Star | Best Writer |
| **Kim Myung-soo** – **Angel's Last Mission: Love**; **Kim Se-jeong** – **I Wanna Hear Your Song** | **Lim Sang-choon** – **When the Camellia Blooms** |

== Presenters ==
| Order | Presenter | Award |
|---|---|---|
| 1 | Nam Da-reum, Kim Hwan-hee | Best Young Actor/Actress |
| 2 | Park Sung-hoon (actor) and Park Se-wan | Best New Actor/Actress |
| 3 | Yoon Park and Lee Seol | Best Actor/Actress in a One-Act/Special/Short Drama |
| 4 | In Gyo-jin and Yoon Jin-yi | Best Supporting Actor/Actress |
| 5 | Moon Bo-hyeon and Cho Yeo-jeong | Best Writer |
| 6 | Park Yoon-jae and Park Ha-na | Excellence Award, Actor in a Daily Drama/Actress |
| 7 | Lee Jang-woo and Uee | Excellence Award, Actor in a Serial Drama/Actress |
| 8 | Jun Hyun-moo and Shin Hye-sun | Netizen Award |
| 9 | Park Young-sun | K-Drama Hallyu Award |
| 10 | Lee Ji-hoon (actor, born 1988) and Oh Na-ra | Best Couple Award |
| 11 | Seo Kang-joon and Ra Mi-ran | Excellence Award, Actor in a Mid-length Drama/Actress |
| 12 | Choi Daniel and Baek Jin-hee | Excellence Award, Actor in a Miniseries/Actress |
| 13 | Choi Soo-jong | Top Excellence Award, Actor/Actress |
| 14 | Yang Seung-dong and Yoo Dong-geun | Grand Prize (Daesang) |

== Special Performances ==
| Artist | Performed |
|---|---|
| Brown Eyed Girls | Sixth Sense/Abracadabra/Wonder Woman (원더우먼) |

== See also ==
- 2019 SBS Drama Awards
- 2019 MBC Drama Awards
