= 7th APAN Star Awards =

2020 edition of award ceremony

- Official poster
- Date: January 23, 2021
- Site: Kyung Hee University
- Hosted by: Kim Seung-woo

Highlights
- Most awards: Crash Landing on You & It's Okay to Not Be Okay (4)
- Grand Prize (Daesang): Hyun Bin (Crash Landing on You)
- Drama of the Year: Itaewon Class
- Website: APAN Star Awards

Television/radio coverage
- Network: Olleh TV; Seezn

The 7th APAN Star Awards ceremony was held on January 23, 2021, at Kyung Hee University Peace Hall, Seoul, and was hosted by Kim Seung-woo. It was broadcast exclusively on online platforms Olleh TV and Seezn. First held in 2012, the annual awards ceremony recognizes the excellence in South Korea's television. Nominees were selected from dramas that aired on free-to-air networks MBC, KBS and SBS and cable channels tvN, JTBC, OCN, MBN and TV Chosun.

Originally set to take place on November 29, 2020, the physical ceremony was indefinitely postponed on November 18, 2020, after Level 1.5 social distancing rules went into effect amid a resurgence of the COVID-19 pandemic in Seoul and surrounding metropolitan areas. On December 17, it was announced that the awards will be held in 2021 on January 24. It was again rescheduled for January 23; it was a two-day integrated event collectively referred to as the APAN MusicStar Awards.

== Winners and nominees ==
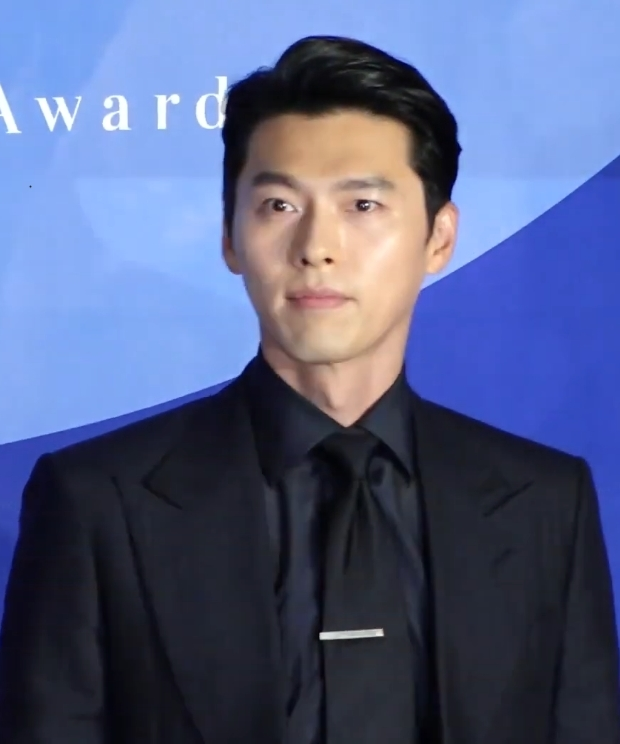
Hyun Bin — Grand Prize (Daesang) winner for Crash Landing on You

- Winners are listed first, highlighted in **boldface**, and indicated with a dagger (†).

Source: Nominees

**Grand Prize (Daesang)**: **Hyun Bin** — **Crash Landing on You** †; Park Seo-joon — Itaewon Class; Kim Hye-soo —Hyena; Kim Hee-ae — The World of the Married; Gong Hyo-jin — When the Camellia Blooms	**Drama of the Year**: **Itaewon Class** (**JTBC**) †; Crash Landing on You (tvN); Hospital Playlist (tvN); It's Okay to Not Be Okay (tvN); When the Camellia Blooms (KBS2)
**Best Director**: **Cha Yeong-hoon** — **When the Camellia Blooms** †	**Best Screenwriter**: **Lee Shin-hwa** — **Hot Stove League** †
**Best Web Drama**: **Best Mistake 2** (**VLIVE**) †	**Best Short Drama**: **Live Like That** (**KBS2**) †
**Top Excellence Award, Actor in a Miniseries**: **Kang Ha-neul** — **When the Camellia Blooms** †; Jo Jung-suk — Hospital Playlist; Namkoong Min — Hot Stove League; Ju Ji-hoon — Hyena; Kim Soo-hyun — It's Okay to Not Be Okay	**Top Excellence Award, Actress in a Miniseries**: **Kim Hee-sun** — **Alice** †; Seo Hyun-jin — Black Dog: Being A Teacher; Son Ye-jin — Crash Landing on You; Jang Na-ra — VIP; Cho Yeo-jeong — Woman of 9.9 Billion
**Excellence Award, Actor in a Miniseries**: **Park Hae-joon** — **The World of the Married** †; Joo Won — Alice; Ji Chang-wook — Backstreet Rookie; Kim Min-jae — Do You Like Brahms?; Park Bo-gum — Record of Youth	**Excellence Award, Actress in a Miniseries**: **Seo Yea-ji** — **It's Okay to Not Be Okay** †; Kim Yoo-jung — Backstreet Rookie; Seo Ji-hye — Crash Landing on You; Park Eun-bin — Do You Like Brahms? & Hot Stove League; Lee Sung-kyung — Dr. Romantic 2
**Top Excellence Award, Actor in a Serial Drama**: **Lee Sang-yeob** — **Once Again** †; Oh Chang-seok — A Place in the Sun; Lee Jang-woo — Homemade Love Story; Oh Ji-ho — Never Twice; Lee Sang-woo — The Golden Garden	**Top Excellence Award, Actress in a Serial Drama**: **Lee Min-jung** — **Once Again** †; Yoon So-yi — A Place in the Sun; Jo Yoon-hee — Beautiful Love, Wonderful Life; Cha Ye-ryun — Gracious Revenge; Han Ji-hye — The Golden Garden
**Excellence Award, Actor in a Serial Drama**: **Lee Sang-yi** — **Once Again** †; Kang Eun-tak — Man in a Veil; Yoon Park — Beautiful Love, Wonderful Life; Kwak Dong-yeon — Never Twice; Seo Do-young — Want a Taste?	**Excellence Award, Actress in a Serial Drama**: **Shim Yi-young** — **My Wonderful Life** †; Lee Chae-young — Man in a Veil; Seol In-ah — Beautiful Love, Wonderful Life; Jin Ki-joo — Homemade Love Story; Choi Yoon-so — Unasked Family
**Best Supporting Actor**: **Oh Jung-se** — **It's Okay to Not Be Okay** & **Hot Stove League** †; **Kim Young-min** — **The World of the Married** & **Crash Landing on You** †; Kim Jung-hyun — Crash Landing on You; Yang Kyung-won — Crash Landing on You; Woo Do-hwan — The King: Eternal Monarch; In Gyo-jin — Homemade Love Story	**Best Supporting Actress**: **Kim Sun-young** — **Crash Landing on You** & **Backstreet Rookie** †; Choo Ja-hyun — My Unfamiliar Family; Lee Elijah — The Good Detective; Lee Jung-eun — Once Again; Son Dam-bi — When the Camellia Blooms; Yeom Hye-ran — When the Camellia Blooms & Mystic Pop-up Bar
**Best New Actor**: **Lee Do-hyun** — **18 Again** †; **Jang Dong-yoon** — **The Tale of Nokdu** †; Ahn Hyo-seop — Dr. Romantic 2; Lee Jae-wook — Extraordinary You; Ahn Bo-hyun — Itaewon Class; Lee Hak-joo — The World of the Married	**Best New Actress**: **Jeon Mi-do** — **Hospital Playlist** †; Ahn Eun-jin — Hospital Playlist; Kim Da-mi — Itaewon Class; Lee Cho-hee — Once Again; Han So-hee — The World of the Married; Park Ju-hyun — Zombie Detective
**Best Manager**: **Kang Geon-taek** (**VAST Entertainment**) †

=== Popularity awards ===
Nominees in various popularity categories were announced on October 26, 2020. Winners were determined solely by fan voting. Voting began on October 27 via the Idol Champ mobile app and continued until November 27. Voting for the KT Seezn Star category took place on the Seezn app. Winners were announced on November 30.

**Popular Star Award, Actor**: **Kim Soo-hyun** — **It's Okay to Not Be Okay** †	**Popular Star Award, Actress**: **Seo Yea-ji** — **It's Okay to Not Be Okay** †
**KT Seezn Star Award**: **Son Ye-jin** — **Crash Landing on You** †	**Best Original Soundtrack**: **V (BTS) – "Sweet Night"** (**Itaewon Class OST**) †

== See also ==
- APAN Music Awards
