= Kim Yi-kyung =

South Korean actress (born 1997)

- Born: Kim Yi-kyung; 22 September 1997 (age 29); South Korea
- Education: Cheongju University (Department of Theater)
- Occupation: Actress
- Years active: 2018–present
- Agent: Big Smile Entertainment

Korean name
- Hangul: 김이경
- RR: Gim Igyeong
- MR: Kim Igyŏng

Kim Yi-kyung (Korean: 김이경; born 22 September 1997) is a South Korean actress. She is known for her roles in dramas Unasked Family, Extracurricular and Sweet Home.

== Filmography ==
=== Film ===
Year	Title	Role	Ref.
2019	Metamorphosis	High School Student	
2019	The Divine Move 2: The Wrathful	Baduk Club Player	
2019	Bring Me Home	Nurse	
2024	Sister Yu Jeong	Yoo Hee-jin	
2024	Beautiful Audrey	Baek Jang-mi	

=== Television series ===
Year	Title	Role	Ref.
2018	Twelve Nights	Joo Ah-reum	
2018	Less Than Evil	Kwon Soo-ah	
2019	Angel's Last Mission: Love	Gi Bo-ra	
2019	Birthday Letter	Jo Young-geum	
2019	The Tale of Nokdu	Ok-ran	
2019	Unasked Family	Kang Yeo-joo	
2020	Extracurricular	Kim Ji-ye	
2020	Pure Melo District	Kim Seol	
2020	My Fuxxxxx Romance	Lee Hyun	
2020	Sweet Home	Cha Soo-ah	
2020–2021	The Uncanny Counter	Kim Yeong-nim	
2021	Youth of May	In-young	
2021	KBS Drama Special: "Be Twin"	Lee-kyung	
2021	Here's My Plan	Hee Jin	
2021	Love Refresh	Koo Sun-hee	
2021–2022	Young Lady and Gentleman	Kang Mi-rim	
2023	A Good Day to Be a Dog	Min Ji-ah	
2024	Sweet Home Season 3	Cha Soo-ah	
