= Unasked Family =

2019 South Korean television series

- Official poster
- Hangul: 꽃길만 걸어요
- Lit.: Let’s Walk Only on Flower Paths
- RR: Kkotgilman georeoyo
- MR: Kkotkilman kŏrŏyo
- Genre: Family; Romance; Melodrama
- Created by: KBS Drama Division
- Written by: Chae Hye-young; Na Seung-hyun; Baek Eunjung (50~123 episodes)
- Directed by: Park Ki-hyun
- Starring: Choi Yoon-so; Seol Jung-hwan; Shim Ji-ho; Jung Yoo-min
- Music by: Choi In-hee
- Country of origin: South Korea
- Original language: Korean
- No. of episodes: 123

Production
- Executive producer: Jeon Woo sung (KBS)
- Camera setup: Single-camera
- Running time: 30 minutes
- Production company: KBS Drama Production

Original release
- Network: KBS1
- Release: October 28, 2019 – April 17, 2020

Unasked Family (Korean: 꽃길만 걸어요) is a South Korean television series starring Choi Yoon-so, Seol Jung-hwan, Shim Ji-ho, and Jung Yoo-min. The series aired on KBS1 from October 28, 2019 to April 17, 2020.

== Synopsis ==
The story of the series depicts the life changing story of Kang Yeo-Won (Choi Yoon-so) and Bong Cheon-dong (Seol Jung-hwan). When Kang Yeo-Won was a university student, she dreamed of becoming a reporter. An unexpected pregnancy caused her to change that dream. She is now a housewife, and is busy taking care of her troublemaker in-laws, raising her child and managing her family's finances. Her husband gets into an accident and her life changes. Bong Cheon-dong grew up in an orphanage with his younger sister. He had a heart disease, but he was able to get an operation due to Hwang Byung-rae (Sunwoo Jae-duk). He is now a grown man. Bong Cheon-dong passes his bar exam, but he works for Hwang Byung-rae, President of Hana Beverage.

== Cast ==
=== Main ===
- Choi Yoon-so as Kang Ye-won, Connib's daughter-in-law. Rewarding mom.
- Seol Jung-hwan as Bong Cheon-dong, Lawyer. Head of External Cooperation Team, Hana Beverage.
- Shim Ji-ho as Kim Ji-hoon, Cheondong's nursery school motivation Head of Hana Beverage Management Planning Division.
  - Noh Young-min as young Kim Ji-hoon
- Jung Yoo-min as Hwang Soo-ji, only daughter of Byeong-rae and Yun-gyeong. Pop artist.
  - Lee Na-yoon as young Hwang Soo-ji

Supporting

- Yang Hee-kyung as Wang Connib, Yeowon's mother-in-law. Dong-woo and Il-nam, Ji-young, and Lee-nam's mother.
- Jo Hee-bong as Nam Il-nam
- Jeong So-young as Nam Ji-young, Connib's stepdaughter and wife of Sangmoon. The owner of a dog cafe.
- Ryu Dam as Jang Sang-moon
- Na In-woo as Nam Yi-nam
- Im Ji-kyu as Nam Dong-woo
- Lee A-ra as Nam Bo-ram
- Kim Ji-hoon as Jang Young-jae
- Kim Kyu-chul as Kang Kyu-cheol
- Kim Yi-kyung as Kang Yeo-joo
- Sunwoo Jae-duk as Hwang Byung-rae
- Kim Kyung-sook as Gu Yun-kyeong
- Lee Yu-jin as Bong Seon-hwa
- Lee Da-ni as Yang Jin-hee
- Kim O-bok as Bae Sung-ho
- Hong Ji-hee as Trần Thị Trang
- Kim Joong-don as Choi Man-sub
- Kim Mi-ra as Yoon Jung-sook
- Kim Tae-won as Lee Poo-reum
- Kim Tae-hyang as office manager
- Park Jung-eon as Reporter Choi Yoon-Jin (Ep. 24, 50–51)

== Viewership ==
Average TV viewership ratings
Ep.	Original broadcast date	Average audience share		
Ep.	Original broadcast date	TNmS	AGB Nielsen	
Ep.	Original broadcast date	Nationwide	Nationwide	Seoul
1	September 26, 2018	20.8%	18.5%	17.0%
2	September 27, 2018	18.9%	16.0%	14.0%
3	September 28, 2018	15.5%	14.1%	12.3%
4	September 29, 2018	18.0%	15.4%	13.6%
5	September 30, 2018	16.2%	14.1%	13.5%
6	October 1, 2018	18.1%	16.2%	14.4%
7	October 2, 2018	17.8%	15.5%	14.1%
8	October 3, 2018	17.5%	14.1%	12.5%
9	October 4, 2018	16.8%	14.7%	12.6%
10	October 5, 2018	16.2%	14.2%	12.9%
11	October 6, 2018	17.7%	16.1%	14.5%
12	October 7, 2018	16.5%	15.0%	12.8%
13	October 8, 2018	16.4%	14.7%	13.6%
14	October 9, 2018	18.9%	16.2%	14.7%
15	October 10, 2018	16.4%	14.4%	12.5%
16	October 11, 2018	19.4%	17.4%	15.7%
17	October 12, 2018	16.9%	15.4%	13.6%
18	October 13, 2018	17.7%	16.5%	14.7%
19	October 14, 2018	17.6%	15.8%	14.2%
20	October 15, 2018	18.1%	17.5%	15.6%
21	October 16, 2018	17.5%	17.3%	16.0%
22	October 17, 2018	17.7%	15.3%	13.4%
23	October 18, 2018	18.7%	16.5%	15.1%
24	October 19, 2018	18.1%	15.6%	14.2%
25	October 20, 2018	19.3%	17.6%	16.0%
26	October 21, 2018	16.4%	17.5%	15.9%
27	October 22, 2018	17.4%	15.9%	14.4%
28	October 23, 2018	18.8%	17.0%	15.3%
29	October 24, 2018	19.2%	16.4%	14.6%
30	October 25, 2018	19.9%	18.0%	16.2%
31	October 26, 2018	19.6%	17.2%	15.4%
32	October 27, 2018	18.7%	17.2%	16.0%
33	October 28, 2018	21.1%	18.0%	16.2%
34	October 29, 2018	20.0%	17.9%	16.8%
35	October 30, 2018	21.2%	19.1%	17.4%
36	October 31, 2018	20.3%	18.6%	17.6%
37	November 1, 2018	19.0%	16.4%	14.8%
38	November 2, 2018	20.5%	17.4%	15.2%
39	November 3, 2018	19.9%	16.9%	15.5%
40	November 4, 2018	20.6%	18.4%	16.6%
41	November 5, 2018	19.1%	16.4%	15.1%
42	November 6, 2018	19.8%	18.0%	17.3%
43	November 7, 2018	21.4%	19.1%	18.1%
44	November 8, 2018	18.3%	16.6%	15.4%
45	November 9, 2018	20.5%	19.1%	17.4%
46	November 10, 2018	18.9%	17.4%	15.8%
47	November 11, 2018	21.8%	19.6%	17.7%
48	November 12, 2018	22.7%	20.1%	18.6%
49	November 13, 2018	20.1%	19.2%	18.1%
50	November 14, 2018	22.6%	19.9%	18.9%
51	November 15, 2018	21.8%	19.2%	18.3%
52	November 16, 2018	19.5%	18.5%	17.2%
53	November 17, 2018	22.7%	19.8%	18.5%
54	November 18, 2018	20.4%	18.7%	17.2%
55	November 19, 2018	22.8%	19.6%	17.8%
56	November 20, 2018	21.4%	19.1%	18.3%
57	November 21, 2018	20.3%	18.1%	17.1%
58	November 22, 2018	21.4%	19.0%	17.5%
59	November 23, 2018	21.7%	18.7%	16.5%
60	November 24, 2018	22.2%	19.9%	17.5%
61	November 25, 2018	21.5%	19.4%	18.1%
62	November 26, 2018	21.4%	18.9%	17.4%
63	November 27, 2018	22.1%	19.3%	18.1%
64	November 28, 2018	15.8%	14.1%	13.1%
65	November 29, 2018	21.3%	20.7%	19.3%
66	November 30, 2018	22.5%	20.1%	18.6%
67	December 1, 2018	22.4%	19.9%	18.0%
68	December 2, 2018	—N/a	19.9%	18.5%
69	December 3, 2018	22.8%	19.9%	18.5%
70	December 4, 2018	24.0%	20.9%	19.7%
71	December 5, 2018	23.7%	20.9%	19.4%
72	December 6, 2018	22.5%	19.8%	18.4%
73	December 7, 2018	24.0%	22.0%	20.2%
74	December 8, 2018	22.5%	19.9%	18.4%
75	December 9, 2018	25.4%	21.5%	19.2%
76	December 10, 2018	23.0%	21.4%	19.9%
77	December 11, 2018	23.4%	21.1%	19.2%
78	December 12, 2018	24.4%	21.0%	19.3%
79	December 13, 2018	22.8%	21.4%	20.0%
80	December 14, 2018	23.3%	21.8%	20.2%
81	December 15, 2018	23.2%	21.2%	19.6%
82	December 16, 2018	22.6%	20.7%	19.3%
83	December 17, 2018	23.9%	21.1%	19.0%
84	December 18, 2018	22.4%	21.7%	19.5%
85	December 19, 2018	23.5%	21.7%	19.9%
86	December 20, 2018	24.1%	21.8%	19.3%
87	December 21, 2018	22.8%	22.1%	20.1%
88	December 22, 2018	23.1%	22.2%	20.3%
89	December 23, 2018	24.6%	22.2%	20.6%
90	December 24, 2018	23.1%	22.0%	20.0%
91	December 25, 2018	23.9%	21.7%	19.8%
92	December 26, 2018	23.7%	21.0%	19.0%
93	December 27, 2018	24.5%	21.9%	19.7%
94	December 28, 2018	23.4%	22.4%	21.0%
95	December 29, 2018	24.1%	22.2%	20.5%
96	December 30, 2018	24.6%	21.5%	19.5%
97	December 31, 2018	22.9%	22.1%	20.3%
98	January 1, 2019	23.9%	22.2%	20.3%
99	January 2, 2019	23.9%	22.2%	19.9%
100	January 3, 2019	24.2%	21.5%	19.5%
101	January 4, 2019	24.1%	22.1%	20.2%
102	January 5, 2019	24.2%	22.1%	20.2%
103	January 6, 2019	24.2%	23.5%	21.9%
104	January 7, 2019	23.3%	22.5%	20.6%
105	January 8, 2019	24.8%	22.7%	20.7%
106	January 9, 2019	25.0%	22.8%	21.0%
107	January 10, 2019	24.8%	22.1%	20.5%
108	January 11, 2019	25.6%	22.7%	21.0%
109	January 12, 2019	25.0%	22.5%	21.3%
110	January 13, 2019	24.4%	22.0%	20.7%
111	January 14, 2019	24.0%	22.2%	20.6%
112	January 15, 2019.	24.3%	21.6%	19.9%
113	January 16, 2019	23.6%	21.8%	19.8%
114	January 17, 2019	24.0%	21.9%	20.4%
115	January 18, 2019	24.9%	22.1%	20.5%
116	January 19, 2019	24.7%	22.2%	20.7%
117	January 20, 2019	24.3%	22.6%	21.5%
118	January 21, 2019	24.0%	22.9%	21.6%
119	January 22, 2019	24.2%	22.3%	21.1%
120	January 23, 2019	25.7%	22.6%	21.0%
121	January 24, 2019	24.1%	23.1%	22.2%
122	January 25, 2019	25.1%	23.1%	21.2%
123	January 26, 2019	24.8%	23.9%	22.2%
Average		%	%	%
In this table above, the blue numbers represent the lowest ratings and the red numbers represent the highest ratings.; N/A denotes that the rating is not known.

== Awards and nominations ==
Year	Award	Category	Recipient	Result
2019	33rd KBS Drama Awards	Excellence Award, Actor in a Daily Drama	Seol Jung-hwan	Won
2019	33rd KBS Drama Awards	Excellence Award, Actress in a Daily Drama	Choi Yoon-so	Nominated
2019	33rd KBS Drama Awards	Best New Actress	Jung Yoo-min	Nominated
2019	33rd KBS Drama Awards	Best Young Actor	Kim Ji-hoon	Nominated
2021	7th APAN Star Awards	Excellence Award, Actress in a Serial Drama	Choi Yoon-so	Nominated
