= Seol Jung-hwan =

South Korean actor and model (born 1985)

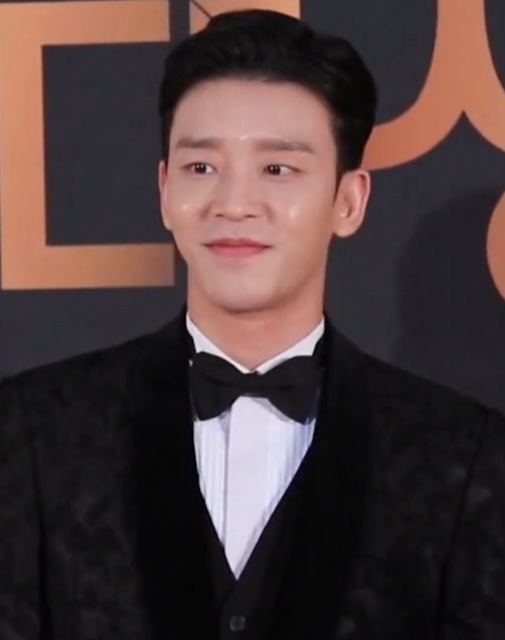
- Seol in 2020
- Born: September 19, 1985 (age 41); South Korea
- Education: Seoul Arts College
- Occupations: Actor; model
- Agent: Hunus Entertainment

Korean name
- Hangul: 설정환
- RR: Seol Jeonghwan
- MR: Sŏl Chŏnghwan

Seol Jung-hwan (born November 5, 1985) is a South Korean actor and model.

== Filmography ==
=== Television series ===
Year	Title	Role
2012	HDTV Literature "The Endless World of Literature"	
2016	Puck!	Seok-won
2016	Marrying My Daughter Twice	Park Soo-cheol
2017	Saimdang, Memoir of Colors	
2017	Teacher Oh Soon-nam	Kang Woon-gil
2017	My Sassy Girl	Maeng Gwang-soo
2018	Welcome to Waikiki	Lee Yoon-Suk (episodes 1, 2, 11)
2018	My Contracted Husband, Mr. Oh	Han Seung-tae
2019	Beautiful Love, Wonderful Life	Seol Jung-hwan (cameo)
2019	Unasked Family	Bong Cheon-dong
2021	Revolutionary Sisters	Heo Gi-jin
2022	Bravo, My Life	Seo Jae-seok (episodes 1–5)
2022–2023	Red Balloon	Kwon Tae-gi
2025–2026	A Graceful Liar	Joo Ha-neul
2026	A Trap Called Desire	Cha Seok-jin

== Awards and nominations ==
Year	Award	Category	Nominated work	Result
2019	33rd KBS Drama Awards	Excellence Award, Actor in a Daily Drama	Unasked Family	Won

== See also ==
- List of South Korean male actors
