= Choi Yoon-so =

South Korean actress

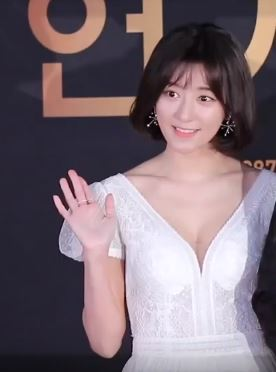
- Choi in 2019
- Born: November 29, 1984 (age 40); Jeonju, South Korea
- Education: Dongduk Women's University
- Occupation: Actress
- Years active: 2003–present
- Agent: Big Picture Entertainment

Korean name
- Hangul: 최윤소
- RR: Choe Yunso
- MR: Ch'oe Yunso

Choi Yoon-so (Korean: 최윤소; born November 29, 1984) is a South Korean actress. She is notable for portraying the villainous and ruthless Koo Hae-joo in the daily drama series Unknown Woman.

== Filmography ==
=== Film ===
Year	Title	Role	Notes	Ref.
2003	Silver Knife	Kyung-joo		
2012	The Heaven is Only Open to the Single	Yoon-so		
2014	Santa Barbara	Filming actress		
2015	Rookie(菜鸟)	Wang Manfei	Chinese Film	
2016	Insane	Ji-young		
2016	Road Kill	Mi-yeon		
2017	Ordinary Person	Ji-sook		

=== Television series ===
Year	Title	Role	Notes	Ref.
2008–2009	My Precious You	Han Yoo-jin		
2010–2011	Secret Garden	Kim Hee-won		
2010–2011	Smile Again	Baek Yoo-jin		
2011	Royal Family	Yoo Shin-ah		
2011	KBS Drama Special: "Hair Show"	Kim Yoo-ri		
2011	Lie to Me	Woman at the blind date	Cameo	
2011	Warrior Baek Dong-soo	Goo-hyang		
2011	KBS Drama Special: "Ji-hoon's Born in 1982"	Ahn Seo-yeon		
2012	KBS Drama Special: "Girl Detective, Park Hae-sol"	Ye Ri-na		
2012	My Husband Got a Family	Kang Hye-soo		
2012	Can't Live Without You	Lee Hyun-kyung		
2012	The Third Hospital	Jung Seung-hee		
2013	KBS TV Novel: "Eunhui"	Cha Young-joo		
2014	Liar Game	Goo Ja-young		
2014	Love Frequency 37.2	Go Dong-hee		
2015	Second 20s	Shin Sang-ye		
2016	Local Hero	Kim Seo-an		
2016	Happy Home	Bong Hae-won		
2017	Unknown Woman	Koo Hae-joo		
2017	The Lady in Dignity	Heo Jin-hee		
2018	Mother	Yeong Yeong-sin		
2019–2020	Unasked Family	Kang Ye-won		
2021	The Penthouse: War in Life 3	Mental Hospital Nurse	Cameo (Episode 14)	
2023	Love to Hate You	Grace		

=== Television shows ===
Year	Title	Role	Notes	Ref.
2011	Band of Goddess	Cast		

=== Music video appearances ===
Year	Song Title	Artist	Ref.
2002	"For Me Without You" (내가 없는 날 위해)	Kang Sung-hoon	
2004	"How Come" (어쩌다가)	Ran	

== Awards and nominations ==
Name of the award ceremony, year presented, category, nominee of the award, and the result of the nomination
Award ceremony	Year	Category	Nominee / Work	Result	Ref.
APAN Star Awards	2021	Excellence Actress in a Serial Drama	Unasked Family	Nominated	
Character Model Contest	2002	Grand Prize Winner	Choi Yoon-so	Won	
KBS Drama Awards	2019	Excellence Award, Actress in a Daily Drama	Unasked Family	Nominated	
Korea Culture and Entertainment Awards	2012	Best New Actress Award in Film	The Heaven is Only Open to the Single	Won	
MBC Drama Awards	2016	Best New Actress	Happy Home	Nominated	
