= Unknown Woman (TV series) =

2017 South Korean television series

- Promotional poster
- Also known as: The Woman Without a Name
- Hangul: 이름 없는 여자
- Lit.: Nameless Woman
- RR: Ireum eomneun yeoja
- MR: Irŭm ŏmnŭn yŏja
- Genre: Melodrama; Revenge
- Created by: KBS Drama Production (KBS 드라마 제작국)
- Written by: Moon Eun-ah
- Directed by: Kim Myung-uk
- Creative directors: Go Byung-chul; Woo Myung-il
- Starring: Oh Ji-eun; Bae Jong-ok; Park Yoon-jae; Seo Ji-seok; Choi Yoon-so
- Music by: Kim Seon-min (CP)
- Country of origin: South Korea
- Original language: Korean
- No. of episodes: 102

Production
- Executive producers: Kim Hui-yeol; Kim Sung-geun
- Producers: Lee Ho; Na Su-ji
- Running time: 35 min
- Production company: Pan Entertainment
- Budget: 3.8 billion won

Original release
- Network: KBS2
- Release: April 24 – September 15, 2017

Unknown Woman (Korean: 이름 없는 여자; lit. 'Nameless Woman') is a 2017 South Korean television series starring Oh Ji-eun, Bae Jong-ok, Park Yoon-jae, Seo Ji-seok, and Choi Yoon-so. The series aired on KBS2 on Monday to Friday from 7:50 p.m. to 8:30 p.m. (KST).

== Cast ==
=== Main ===
- Oh Ji-eun as Son Yeo-ri / Yoon Seol
- Bae Jong-ok as Hong Ji-won
- Park Yoon-jae as Goo Do-chi
  - Jung Yoo-geun as young Do-chi
- Seo Ji-seok as Kim Moo-yeol
- Choi Yoon-so as Goo Hae-joo

=== Supporting ===
==== People around Yeo-ri / Yoon Seol ====
- Han Kap-soo as Son Joo-ho

Yeo-ri's adoptive father.

- Seo Kwon-soon as Seo Mal-nyeon

Yoon Seol's mother.

- Sun Dong-hyuk as Yoon Ki-dong

Yoon Seol's father.

- Park Joon-hyuk as Oliver Jang

Yoon Seol's ex-fiancé; Ae-nok's boyfriend.

==== People around Ji-won ====
- Byun Woo-min as Goo Do-young

Ji-won's husband.

- Joo Seung-hyuk as Goo Hae-sung

Do-young's and Ji-won's son, Hae-joo's stepbrother.

==== People around Moo-yeol ====
- Bang Eun-hee as Jang Ae-nok

Moo-yeol's mother.

- Lee In-ha as Kim Yeol-mae

Moo-yeol's sister.

- Choi Hyun-joon as Kim Ga-ya

Moo-yeol's and Hae-joo's son.

- Kim Ji-an as Kim Ma-ya / Son Bom

Moo-yeol's and Yeo-ri's daughter.

==== People around Do-chi ====
- Yeo Hoon-min as Jjang-goo

Do-chi's friend.

==== Extended ====
- Han Ji-woo as Han So-ra

Do-chi's ex-fiancée.

- Sora Jung as Choi Mi-hee (Angela Choi)

Hae-joo's biological mother, Do-young's ex-wife.

- Kim Tae-young as Kim Joon-myung

Hae-sung's family doctor.

- Kim Ji-eun as Lee Hwa-young

Woman who falsely accused Do-chi.

- Jo Seon-mook as Kim Jae-goo

Wid Group's lawyer.

- Jo Ye-rin as Kim Bom (Kelly Kim)

Ma-ya's friend.

- Park So-jung as Kim Soon-mi

Kim Bom's mother.

- Kim Sa-hee as Cellist

Do-young's mistress.

- Jo Sung-hee as Secretary Kim
- Kim Kwang-hyun as Doctor
- Moon Woo-jin as Hysterical Child

== Ratings ==
- In this table, The blue numbers represent the lowest ratings and the red numbers represent the highest ratings.

Ep.	Original broadcast date	Average audience share			
Ep.	Original broadcast date	TNmS		AGB Nielsen	
Ep.	Original broadcast date	Nationwide	Seoul	Nationwide	Seoul
1	April 24, 2017	19.7% (2nd)	17.1% (3rd)	16.7% (3rd)	15.1% (4th)
2	April 25, 2017	18.8% (2nd)	16.5% (2nd)	16.4% (2nd)	14.6% (2nd)
3	April 26, 2017	17.0% (3rd)	15.5% (3rd)	14.8% (3rd)	13.7% (3rd)
4	April 27, 2017	18.1% (2nd)	16.4% (3rd)	14.4% (3rd)	13.1% (3rd)
5	April 28, 2017	15.5% (1st)	13.1% (1st)	13.4% (1st)	12.4% (1st)
6	May 1, 2017	17.1% (3rd)	15.2% (3rd)	15.0% (4th)	13.0% (5th)
7	May 2, 2017	15.8% (1st)	14.0% (2nd)	12.4% (2nd)	11.4% (2nd)
8	May 3, 2017	17.3% (3rd)	15.8% (3rd)	14.4% (3rd)	12.8% (3rd)
9	May 4, 2017	19.0% (2nd)	17.7% (2nd)	15.0% (3rd)	13.6% (3rd)
10	May 5, 2017	17.6% (2nd)	16.7% (2nd)	15.4% (3rd)	13.4% (3rd)
11	May 8, 2017	19.0% (3rd)	17.8% (3rd)	16.0% (3rd)	14.0% (4th)
12	May 9, 2017	13.5% (2nd)	13.6% (1st)	11.4% (3rd)	10.3% (3rd)
13	May 10, 2017	17.0% (3rd)	14.9% (3rd)	14.6% (3rd)	13.7% (3rd)
14	May 11, 2017	19.4% (2nd)	17.3% (2nd)	17.1% (2nd)	15.9% (3rd)
15	May 12, 2017	18.8% (2nd)	16.3% (3rd)	17.6% (3rd)	16.0% (3rd)
16	May 15, 2017	21.1% (2nd)	19.9% (2nd)	17.7% (3rd)	16.8% (4th)
17	May 16, 2017	19.1% (2nd)	16.1% (3rd)	17.1% (3rd)	15.5% (4th)
18	May 17, 2017	19.6% (2nd)	17.2% (2nd)	16.5% (3rd)	14.9% (3rd)
19	May 18, 2017	18.4% (2nd)	15.7% (2nd)	16.1% (2nd)	14.0% (4th)
20	May 19, 2017	19.9% (2nd)	17.0% (2nd)	17.7% (2nd)	16.5% (2nd)
21	May 22, 2017	19.4% (2nd)	18.2% (2nd)	16.2% (4th)	14.8% (4th)
22	May 24, 2017	18.4% (2nd)	15.4% (2nd)	14.1% (4th)	14.1% (4th)
23	May 25, 2017	18.1% (2nd)	15.6% (3rd)	16.0% (3rd)	14.9% (4th)
24	May 29, 2017	15.4% (3rd)	15.0% (3rd)	14.9% (3rd)	13.3% (3rd)
25	May 31, 2017	16.6% (2nd)	15.8% (2nd)	13.6% (3rd)	11.7% (5th)
26	June 1, 2017	17.1% (2nd)	15.5% (3rd)	15.6% (3rd)	14.5% (4th)
27	June 2, 2017	17.9% (2nd)	17.3% (1st)	16.3% (2nd)	15.3% (3rd)
28	June 5, 2017	16.3% (3rd)	14.7% (3rd)	16.2% (2nd)	14.7% (3rd)
29	June 6, 2017	19.8% (2nd)	17.9% (2nd)	17.4% (2nd)	15.8% (2nd)
30	June 7, 2017	18.2% (2nd)	16.0% (2nd)	15.0% (3rd)	12.6% (4th)
31	June 8, 2017	16.9% (2nd)	14.3% (3rd)	15.0% (3rd)	13.4% (3rd)
32	June 9, 2017	15.9% (2nd)	15.0% (2nd)	15.4% (2nd)	14.6% (4th)
33	June 12, 2017	17.6% (2nd)	16.1% (2nd)	15.9% (3rd)	14.8% (3rd)
34	June 13, 2017	17.2% (2nd)	15.3% (2nd)	15.5% (3rd)	14.4% (3rd)
35	June 14, 2017	16.0% (2nd)	14.3% (3rd)	14.9% (3rd)	13.6% (4th)
36	June 15, 2017	16.6% (2nd)	15.1% (2nd)	15.6% (2nd)	14.1% (2nd)
37	June 16, 2017	16.8% (2nd)	15.5% (2nd)	14.3% (3rd)	12.7% (4th)
38	June 19, 2017	17.8% (2nd)	16.5% (2nd)	16.4% (3rd)	15.9% (3rd)
39	June 20, 2017	19.1% (2nd)	16.5% (2nd)	16.8% (3rd)	15.5% (3rd)
40	June 21, 2017	16.8% (2nd)	14.5% (2nd)	14.8% (3rd)	13.2% (4th)
41	June 22, 2017	18.6% (2nd)	17.1% (2nd)	15.5% (2nd)	14.7% (3rd)
42	June 23, 2017	18.5% (2nd)	16.0% (2nd)	16.7% (2nd)	15.3% (3rd)
43	June 26, 2017	18.0% (2nd)	16.4% (2nd)	17.9% (2nd)	16.4% (2nd)
44	June 27, 2017	18.3% (2nd)	16.4% (2nd)	17.0% (2nd)	15.2% (3rd)
45	June 28, 2017	16.6% (2nd)	15.1% (2nd)	15.0% (3rd)	13.2% (3rd)
46	June 29, 2017	16.4% (2nd)	14.5% (3rd)	16.0% (2nd)	14.4% (4th)
47	June 30, 2017	21.4% (1st)	17.9% (1st)	16.2% (2nd)	14.7% (4th)
48	July 3, 2017	21.0% (2nd)	18.3% (1st)	18.0% (2nd)	16.3% (3rd)
49	July 4, 2017	20.0% (2nd)	17.3% (2nd)	17.0% (2nd)	14.7% (3rd)
50	July 5, 2017	19.6% (2nd)	16.5% (2nd)	16.0% (3rd)	14.9% (2nd)
51	July 6, 2017	20.3% (2nd)	16.9% (2nd)	16.2% (2nd)	14.9% (3rd)
52	July 7, 2017	22.3% (1st)	20.2% (1st)	18.3% (2nd)	16.8% (3rd)
53	July 10, 2017	22.5% (2nd)	19.5% (1st)	17.5% (3rd)	16.7% (3rd)
54	July 11, 2017	20.0% (1st)	17.4% (1st)	17.4% (2nd)	16.4% (2nd)
55	July 12, 2017	19.6% (2nd)	16.6% (4th)	15.6% (2nd)	14.4% (4th)
56	July 13, 2017	20.8% (2nd)	18.0% (3rd)	17.3% (2nd)	16.2% (2nd)
57	July 14, 2017	19.2% (1st)	15.5% (1st)	17.6% (2nd)	15.5% (4th)
58	July 17, 2017	23.3% (1st)	19.5% (1st)	18.6% (2nd)	15.9% (3rd)
59	July 18, 2017	21.5% (2nd)	18.3% (1st)	18.6% (2nd)	16.7% (3rd)
60	July 19, 2017	20.9% (2nd)	17.4% (1st)	18.9% (2nd)	16.8% (2nd)
61	July 20, 2017	19.8% (2nd)	16.9% (2nd)	18.2% (2nd)	16.5% (2nd)
62	July 21, 2017	21.1% (2nd)	18.2% (2nd)	18.3% (2nd)	17.0% (2nd)
63	July 24, 2017	24.0% (1st)	18.7% (2nd)	20.2% (2nd)	18.3% (2nd)
64	July 25, 2017	22.9% (2nd)	18.4% (2nd)	18.6% (2nd)	16.4% (2nd)
65	July 26, 2017	21.6% (2nd)	17.2% (2nd)	18.0% (2nd)	16.5% (2nd)
66	July 27, 2017	22.4% (2nd)	19.2% (1st)	20.1% (2nd)	18.7% (2nd)
67	July 28, 2017	21.6% (2nd)	17.1% (2nd)	19.1% (2nd)	17.5% (2nd)
68	July 31, 2017	22.6% (2nd)	17.3% (2nd)	20.3% (2nd)	18.4% (2nd)
69	August 1, 2017	22.0% (1st)	17.9% (1st)	19.0% (2nd)	18.1% (2nd)
70	August 2, 2017	21.0% (2nd)	17.1% (2nd)	19.3% (2nd)	17.3% (2nd)
71	August 3, 2017	21.7% (2nd)	17.4% (2nd)	19.5% (2nd)	18.2% (2nd)
72	August 4, 2017	20.2% (1st)	16.2% (2nd)	19.3% (2nd)	18.2% (2nd)
73	August 7, 2017	21.3% (2nd)	17.2% (2nd)	18.6% (2nd)	16.6% (2nd)
74	August 8, 2017	22.6% (2nd)	18.3% (1st)	19.5% (1st)	18.0% (2nd)
75	August 9, 2017	22.8% (1st)	19.3% (1st)	18.8% (2nd)	16.8% (2nd)
76	August 10, 2017	23.5% (2nd)	19.5% (1st)	19.4% (2nd)	18.5% (2nd)
77	August 11, 2017	19.2% (2nd)	16.4% (2nd)	18.0% (2nd)	15.9% (2nd)
78	August 14, 2017	23.1% (2nd)	18.8% (2nd)	20.2% (2nd)	18.2% (2nd)
79	August 15, 2017	20.8% (1st)	16.9% (1st)	19.5% (2nd)	17.9% (2nd)
80	August 16, 2017	22.2% (1st)	18.6% (1st)	18.9% (2nd)	16.7% (2nd)
81	August 17, 2017	22.8% (1st)	19.0% (1st)	20.4% (2nd)	19.0% (2nd)
82	August 18, 2017	23.4% (1st)	18.0% (1st)	21.4% (1st)	19.9% (1st)
83	August 21, 2017	24.2% (2nd)	20.3% (2nd)	20.7% (2nd)	18.8% (2nd)
84	August 22, 2017	24.8% (1st)	18.7% (1st)	20.8% (2nd)	18.6% (2nd)
85	August 23, 2017	23.9% (1st)	19.5% (1st)	20.9% (2nd)	19.2% (2nd)
86	August 24, 2017	24.1% (2nd)	19.0% (1st)	20.7% (2nd)	18.5% (2nd)
87	August 25, 2017	21.4% (2nd)	17.4% (2nd)	19.8% (1st)	17.9% (2nd)
88	August 28, 2017	23.5% (2nd)	18.7% (2nd)	21.9% (1st)	20.4% (1st)
89	August 29, 2017	23.6% (1st)	19.4% (1st)	20.4% (2nd)	18.4% (2nd)
90	August 30, 2017	24.6% (1st)	21.1% (1st)	20.8% (1st)	19.0% (2nd)
91	August 31, 2017	23.7% (2nd)	20.7% (1st)	21.1% (2nd)	19.1% (2nd)
92	September 1, 2017	23.5% (1st)	18.7% (1st)	19.9% (2nd)	17.7% (2nd)
93	September 4, 2017	25.1% (1st)	20.5% (1st)	21.6% (2nd)	19.7% (2nd)
94	September 5, 2017	23.6% (1st)	19.8% (1st)	22.5% (1st)	20.9% (1st)
95	September 6, 2017	25.0% (1st)	21.9% (1st)	23.3% (1st)	21.6% (1st)
96	September 7, 2017	23.3% (1st)	20.2% (1st)	20.6% (2nd)	19.5% (1st)
97	September 8, 2017	23.8% (1st)	19.4% (1st)	21.1% (1st)	19.5% (1st)
98	September 11, 2017	26.3% (1st)	22.7% (1st)	22.8% (1st)	20.9% (1st)
99	September 12, 2017	25.5% (1st)	21.6% (1st)	23.8% (1st)	21.7% (1st)
100	September 13, 2017	24.2% (1st)	19.6% (1st)	21.5% (1st)	19.9% (1st)
101	September 14, 2017	23.7% (1st)	20.1% (1st)	22.0% (1st)	19.7% (1st)
102	September 15, 2017	25.3% (1st)	21.4% (1st)	21.8% (1st)	20.6% (1st)
Average		20.3%	17.4%	17.8%	16.2%

- The episodes set to air on May 23, 2017, and May 26, 2017, were pushed to the next days because of 2017 FIFA U-20 World Cup

== Awards and nominations ==
Year	Award	Category	Recipient	Result
2017	31st KBS Drama Awards	Excellence Award, Actress in a Daily Drama	Bae Jong-ok	Nominated
