= Hong Ji-hee =

South Korean actress (born 1988)

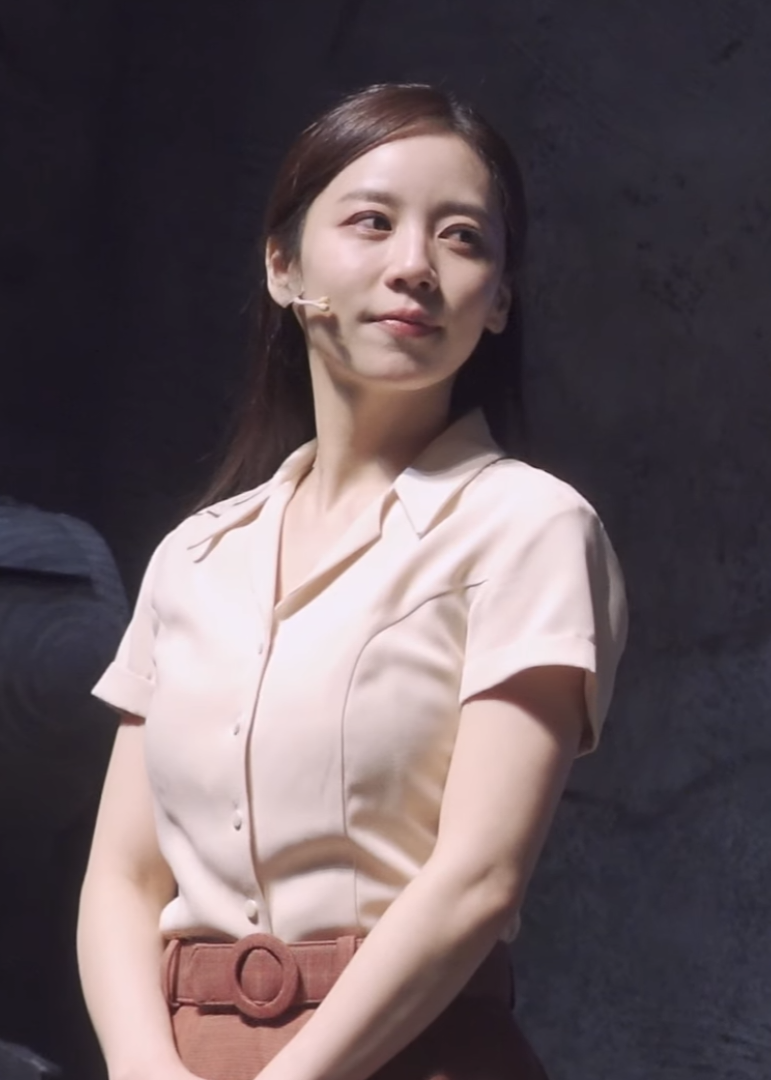
- Hong in March 2025
- Born: July 27, 1988 (age 38); South Korea
- Education: Department of Theater and Film of Kyunghee University
- Occupation: Actress
- Years active: 2009–present
- Agent: El July Entertainment
- Known for: Hometown Cha-Cha-Cha
- Spouse: Unknown (m. 2024)
- Relatives: Hong Ji-yoon (sister)

Korean name
- Hangul: 홍지희
- RR: Hong Jihui
- MR: Hong Chihŭi

Hong Ji-hee (Korean: 홍지희; born July 27, 1988) is a South Korean actress. After graduating from the Department of Theater and Film at Kyunghee University. Hong debuted as a musical actress in 2011 with the fifth season of the open-run musical Finding Kim Jong-wook. Prior to this, she had appeared in minor roles in film Into the White Night (2009) and City of Damnation (2009). She's known for her role in tvN drama series Hometown Cha-Cha-Cha and Big Mouth.

== Career ==
=== Debut and musical career (2009–2014) ===
In 2009, Hong made her feature film debut in Park Shin-woo's film Into the White Night (2009), appearing in a minor role as Cha Young-eun opposite Son Ye-jin. Her second film role that year was as a reporter in the 2009 film City of Damnation.

After completing her studies from Department of Theater and Film of Kyunghee University, Hong began her career as a musical actress. In 2011, Hong passed audition for lead role the open-run musical Finding Kim Jong-wook, portraying a woman searching for her first love. She joined the 5th season cast alongside actors such as Kim Jae-beom, Sang Sang-yoon, Rajun, Kim Ji-hyeon, Baek Eun-hye, Lim Ki-hong, Kim Min-gun, and Lee Ju-hoon for the 5th season of the musical. Director Kim Dong-yeon introduced the cast to the public on June 7, 2011, at the Seoul Theater Center.

In November 2011, director Kim Dong-yeon invited Hong to audition for his new musical, Coffee Prince 1st Store, an adaptation of the popular television drama, but based more closely on Lee Seon-mi's original novel. The musical focused on the romance between Choi Han-gyeol and Go Eun-chan. Hong and Yu Joo-hye were cast as Go Eun-chan, performing opposite Kim Jae-beom and Kim Tae-han as Choi Han-gyeol. Produced by the Kim So-ro Project, the musical ran from February 24 to April 29, 2012, at Filling Hall 1 in Daehangno Cultural Space.

In 2012, Hong also joined the cast of Three Thousands — The Flower of Destruction, a historical musical reimagining the fall of Baekje and its last monarch, King Uija. The production depicted King Uija as a solitary and strong ruler. Hong portrayed Yeon-hwa, a blind court lady. Written and directed by Seo Yoon-mi, the musical was performed from October 26, 2012, to January 20, 2013, at the Daehangno Cultural Space Filling Hall 1.

In 2013, Hong successfully auditioned for the role of Son Na-young in the 13th production of the musical Laundry, which was restaged at the Art One Theater with a new cast. She shared the role with Kwak Sun-young and Park Eun-mi. Preview performances were held on March 13–14, with the full run at Art One Theater 2 in Daehangno continuing until September 29, 2013. In 2014, Hong reprised her role in White Day performance of musical Finding Kim Jong-wook.

The following year, Hong joined the musical Abbocatto. (Note: Abboccato is a wine term meaning semi-dry, and refers to a semi-sweet wine with a medium sugar content. Italian wine is divided into four levels of sweetness, with the driest taste being Secco, followed by Abboccato, Amabile, and Dolce.) This production, which explores the bittersweet memories of love between singer-songwriter Yoo Jae-min and aspiring writer Jeong Da-jeong, was written by Lee Ho-jeon and composed by Lee Jin-wook. It was selected for the 2014 Creative Musical Development Support Project after a competitive process and had been previously introduced through a reading performance by CJ Creative Mind (Note: CJ Creative Mind, in which the CJ Cultural Foundation supports new performers, is the most representative of the creator support program. CJ Culture Foundation, which has already supported creative activities by discovering young creative artists in the theater, musical, dance, and film sectors through the CJ Young Festival from 2006 to 2009, has been conducting 'CJ Creative Minds' since 2010. Through the support of the Musical Division, new creators and works are introduced to revitalize the performance world. Now the program called Stage-up.) in 2012, followed by the SMF Yegreen Encore Showcases in 2012. Hong starred as Jeong Da-jeong in both the demonstration performance in February and the re-staged production at the Daemyung Cultural Factory (DCF) Hall 2 in Daehak-ro from March to April 2015. Also in 2015, Hong reprised the role of Son Na-young in the 10th-anniversary performance of Laundry

=== Theater debut (2015–2017) ===
After four years as a musical actress, Hong sought to expand her repertoire by performing in a play. In 2015, she made her theater debut in Hot Summer, a play produced by the Ganda Theater Company.^{1} She shared the dual lead role of Chae-kyung and Sa-rang with musical actresses Song Sang-eun and Shin Ui-jeong, who had been part of the original 2014 premiere cast, which marked the 10th anniversary of the Ganda Theater Company. The play, written and directed by Min Jun-ho, ran at the Daehangno Freedom Theater from August 11 to November 1, 2015.

In 2016, Hong reunited with director Min Jun-ho for an encore performance of John Cariani's play Almost, Maine. The play returned after a three-year hiatus and ran from January 8 to April 10, 2016, at Sangmyung Art Hall 1 in Daehangno. Hong played three roles—Glory, Waitress, and Gayle—and was the youngest actress in the cast.

Also in 2016, Hong appeared as Mariko in the play Round Trip Letter, based on Minato Kanae's 2010 Japanese novel Ōfuku Shokan (往復書簡). Directed by Kim Myung-hwan, the play centers on longtime lovers Junichi and Mariko, who met in middle school. Junichi departs for volunteer work on a remote South Pacific island with limited electricity, and the couple communicates by letter. Through their correspondence, they confront the truth of an incident from fifteen years prior. Hong and Lee Ji-hae were double-cast as Mariko, opposite Park Si-beom, Kang Jung-woo, and Son Yoo-dong, who were triple-cast as Junichi.

In 2016, Hong joined the cast of the musical Mirror Princess Pyeonggang Story. Written by Choi Eun-i and Min Jun-ho of Ganda Theater Company, the musical was based on the folktale Princess Pyeonggang and On Dal. In late 2017, Hong again collaborated with director and writer Min Jun-ho for his play The 100th Debate of the New Humanity, which he both directed and wrote. The play drew inspiration from a television program focused on various debate topics. Hong and Yoo-yeon were double-cast as Hyun Chung-hee, a parasitologist specializing in the study of poisons, parasites, and viruses.

=== Return to big screen, television debut and recent works (2018-recent) ===
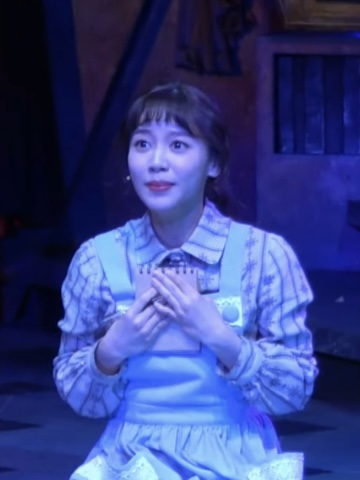
Hong in 2018

After almost a decade since her film debut, Hong returned in 2018 with the independent film Daughters Table. Directed by Son Hee-song, the film tells the story of Ms. Jo's three busy daughters—Su-yeon, Ji-yeon, and So-yeon—who return to their hometown upon hearing news of their mother's illness.

In 2018, Hong took on multiple roles in the play Miracles of the Namiya General Store, an adaptation of a novel by Japanese mystery writer Keigo Higashino. Hong played the characters Akiko, Emiko, and Midori. The play itself was adapted from an earlier work written and directed by Yutaka Narui. It was initially selected for the "Performance, Meet - Accompany" project in 2016, a content development support initiative for the second anniversary of the Daemyung Cultural Factory's opening. Following a pre-reading performance, the play underwent further development before its main staging.

Also in 2018, Hong reunited with director Kim Dong-yeon the musical Vampire Arthur. Hong performed as Emma, a hopeful and pure girl who inspires Arthur, a vampire, to dream of a new world. She subsequently appeared in Sideureus (2020) as Maria and Maybe Happy Ending (2021) as Claire.

Hong's first television role was in the 2019 KBS drama series Unasked Family. She played Trần Thị Trang, a Vietnamese character who falls in love with the eldest son of a prominent Korean restaurant family. Her portrayal of a Vietnamese person who had learned Korean garnered positive viewer reception. In the same year, Hong joined the tvN drama series Arthdal Chronicles as Hae Ga-on.

In 2021, Hong's portrayal of Yoo Cho-hee, a teacher at Cheongjin Elementary School in the tvN drama series Hometown Cha-Cha-Cha, was well-received by viewers. She starred as Hannah in the 2021 musical Four Minutes, based on Chris Krauss's 2006 German film of the same name. Hong conveyed Hannah's desperate emotions as Kruger's same-sex lover.

In 2022, Hong participated in drama Big Mouth as Jang Hye-jin. Also in 2022, Hong appeared in the premiere of the creative musical Let Me Fly, playing Park Jeong-bun, a 19-year-old from the countryside who dreams of traveling to the moon. The musical was directed by Lee Dae-woong, produced by Hong Yun-kyung and Lee Young-chan, with lyrics and script by Jo Min-hyung, and music composed and arranged by Min Chan-hong.

== Personal life ==
On March 17, 2024, Hong announced her intention to marry her non-celebrity boyfriend the following day.

== Filmography ==
=== Film ===
Feature film performances
| Year | Title | | Role | Ref. |
| Year | English | Korean | Role | Ref. |
|---|---|---|---|---|
| 2009 | Into the White Night | 백야행 - 하얀 어둠 속을 걷다 | Cha Young-eun | |
| 2009 | City of Damnation | 유감스러운 도시 | as a reporter at the bombing site | |
| 2018 | Daughter's table | 딸들의 밥상 | Su-yeon | |
| 2018 | Room | 룸 | Ye-bin | |

=== Television series ===
Television performances
| Year | Title | | Role | Notes | Ref. |
| Year | English | Korean | Role | Notes | Ref. |
|---|---|---|---|---|---|
| 2017 | Fight for My Way | 쌈, 마이웨이 | Ara's friend | Minor role, Scene 2 from Chan-sook's wedding | |
| 2019 | Unasked Family | 꽃길만 걸어요 | Trần Thị Trang | | |
| 2019 | Arthdal Chronicles | 아스달 연대기 | Hae Ga-on | | |
| 2020 | Hospital Playlist | 슬기로운 의사생활 | Hee Gwan's wife | Season 1; Ep. 3 | |
| 2021 | Joseon Exorcist | 조선구마사 | Possessed woman | Ep. 2 | |
| 2021 | The Witch's Diner | 마녀식당으로 오세요 | Seo Ae-sook | Young Ae-sook, Ep. 7–8 | |
| 2021 | Hometown Cha-Cha-Cha | 갯마을 차차차 | Yoo Cho-Hui | | |
| 2022 | Big Mouth | 빅마우스 | Jang Hye-jin | | |
| 2023 | The Uncanny Counter | 경이로운 소문 | Lee Min-ji (Joo-seok's wife) | Season 2 | |
| 2024 | Nothing Uncovered | 멱살 한번 잡힙시다 | Mo Soo-rin | | |
| 2024 | A Virtuous Business | 정숙한 세일즈 | Seo Mi-hwa | | |

== Stage ==
=== Musical ===
Musical performances
| Year | Title | | Role | Theater | Date | Ref. |
| Year | English | Korean | Role | Theater | Date | Ref. |
|---|---|---|---|---|---|---|
| 2011–2012 | Finding Kim Jong-wook Season 5 | 김종욱 찾기 시즌5 | A woman looking for her first love | JTN Art Hall 1 | June 14, 2011, to February 24, 2012 | |
| 2011 | Finding Kim Jongwook - Handsome Party Season 3 | 김종욱 찾기 - 훈남파티 시즌3 | A woman looking for her first love | JTN Art Hall 1 | Sep 26 | |
| 2012 | Coffee Prince 1st Store | 커피프린스 1호점 | Go Eun-chan | Daehak-ro T.O.M. Hall 1 | Feb 24 to Apr 29 | |
| 2012–2013 | Samcheon – Flower of Ruin | 삼천-망국의 꽃 | Yeon-hwa | Daehak-ro T.O.M. Hall 1 | Oct 26 to Jan 20 | |
| 2013 | Laundry | 빨래 | Seo Na-young | Daehak-ro T.O.M. Hall 1 | Mar 14 to Oct 5 | |
| 2013 | Seoul Musical | 2013 서울뮤지컬페스티벌 폐막갈라쇼 | Seo Na-young | Chungmu Art Center Grand Theater | Aug 12 to 12 | |
| 2013–2014 | Laundry | 빨래 | Seo Na-young | Art One Theater Hall 2 | Oct 11 to Mar 2 | |
| 2014 | Finding Kim Jong-wook | 김종욱 찾기 | A woman looking for her first love | Petitzel Theater/Plus Theater (formerly Culture Space NU) | Jan 14 to Jun 29 | |
| 2014 | Finding Kim Jongwook - Handsome Party Season 4 | 김종욱 찾기 - 훈남파티 시즌4 | A woman looking for her first love | Petitzel Theater/Plus Theater (formerly Culture Space NU) | February 3 | |
| 2014–2015 | Laundry | 빨래 | Seo Na-young | Oriental Arts Theater Hall 1 (Former Art Center K Square Theater) | Oct 16 to May 31 | |
| 2015 | Abbocatto | 아보카토 | Jeong Da-jeong | Art One Theater Hall 2 | Feb 7 to 15 | |
| 2015 | Abbocatto | 아보카토 | Jeong Da-jeong | Yes24 Stage 2 | Mar 13 to Apr 19 | |
| 2016–2017 | Laundry | 빨래 | Seo Na-young | Oriental Arts Theater Hall 1 (Former Art Center K Square Theater) | Mar 10 to Feb 26 | |
| 2016 | The Mirror Princes Pyeonggang Story | 거울공주 평강이야기 - 고양 | Soldier 1 | Goyang Aramnuri Sara New Theater | Sep 23 to Oct 9 | |
| 2017 | The Mirror Princes Pyeonggang Story | 거울공주 평강이야기 - 고양 | Soldier 1 | Daehakro Arts Theater Small Theater | Nov 3 to 19 | |
| 2018 | Vampire Arthur | 뱀파이어 아더 | Emma | Chungmu Art Center Medium Theater Black | Nov 30 to Feb 10 | |
| 2018 | The Mirror Princes Pyeonggang Story | 거울공주 평강이야기 - 고양 | Soldier 1 | Goyang Aram Nuri Sara Sae Theater | Dec 15 to 22 | |
| 2019 | Little Jack | 리틀잭 | Julie | Daehak-ro T.O.M. Hall 2 | Jul 13 to Sep 8 | |
| 2020 | Midnight | 미드나잇 | Woman | Yes24 Stage3 | Apr 11 to Jun 28 | |
| 2020 | Sideureus | 시데레우스 | Maria | Art One Theater Hall 1 | Aug 12 to Oct 25 | |
| 2020 | Sideureus | 시데레우스 | Maria | Yes24 Stage1 | Oct 31 to Nov 29 | |
| 2021 | Four Minutes | 포미니츠 | Hannah | National Jeongdong Theater | Apr 7 to May 23 | |
| 2021 | Maybe Happy Ending | 어쩌면 해피엔딩 | Claire | Yes24 Stage1 | June 22 to Sep 5 | |
| 2021 | Dear Madeleine | 디어 마들렌 | Madeleine | Wooran 2 Scenes | Sep 17 to 18 | |
| 2022 | Let Me Fly | 렛미플라이 | Jeong-bun | Yes24 Stage1 | Mar 22 to Jun 19 | |
| 2022 | Youth Noise | 청춘소음 | Han Ah-reum | the Brick Theater Daehangno | May 24 to July 31 | |
| 2022 | Islander | 아일랜더 | A-ran | the Wooran Second Scenery of the Wooran Cultural Foundation | Aug 10 to Sep 18 | |
| 2022 | Aloha, my mothers | 알로하, 나의 엄마들 | Willow | M Theater at the Sejong Center for the Performing Arts | Nov 22 to Dec 11 | |
| 2023 | SIX the Musical | | Catherine Parr | Shinhan Card Atrium | March 31 to June 25 | |
| 2023 | Let Me Fly | 렛미플라이 | Jeong-bun | Yes24 Stage1 | September 24 to October 12 | |
| 2023 | Let Me Fly | 렛미플라이 | Jeong-bun | Pyeongchon Art Hall | December 23–24 | |
| 2023–2024 | Il Tenore | 일 테노레 | Seo Jin-yeon | Seoul Arts Centre CJ Towol Theatre | December 19 – February 25 | |
| 2024 | Il Tenore | 일 테노레 | Seo Jin-yeon | Blue Square Shinhan Card Hall | March 29 – May 19 | |
| 2024 | Maybe Happy Ending | 어쩌면 해피엔딩 | Claire | Yes24 Stage 1 in Daehakro, Seoul | June 18 to September 8 | |
| 2024 | Classic | 클래식 | Joo-hee and Ji-hye | CJ Azit Daehangno | July 22 and 23 | |

=== Theater ===
Theater performances
| Year | Title | | Role | Theater | Date | Ref. |
| Year | English | Korean | Role | Theater | Date | Ref. |
|---|---|---|---|---|---|---|
| 2015 | Hot Summer | 뜨거운 여름 | Chae-kyeong/Sa-rang | Daehak-ro Jayu Theater | August 11 to November 1 | |
| 2016 | Round Trip | 왕복서간 | Mariko | Daehak-ro TOM 2 Hall | July 5 to October 16, 2016 | |
| 2016 | Almost, Maine | 올모스트 메인 | Glory, Waitress, Gayle | Sangmyung Art Hall 1 | January 8 to July 3 | |
| 2016 | Almost, Maine | 올모스트 메인 | Glory, Waitress, Gayle | Goyang Aram Nuri Sara Sae Theater | December 16 to 25 | |
| 2017 | New Humanity's 100% Debate | 신인류의 백분토론 | Hyun Chung-hee | Arko Arts Theater Small Theater | February 10 to 26 | |
| 2017 | New Humanity's 100% Debate | 신인류의 백분토론 | Hyun Chung-hee | Art One Theater 3 | May 19 to July 9 | |
| 2017 | New Humanity's 100% Debate | 신인류의 백분토론 | Hyun Chung-hee | Goyang Aram Nuri Sara Sae Theater | July 15 to 22 | |
| 2018 | New Humanity's 100% Debate | 신인류의 백분토론 | Hyun Chung-hee | Hongik University Daehangno Art Center Small Theater | July 20 to August 19 | |
| 2018 | Miracle of Namiya General Store | 나미야 잡화점의 기적 | Akiko, Emiko, and Midori | Yes24 Stage 1 | August 21 to October 21 | |
| 2019 | Hot Summer | 뜨거운 여름 | Chae-kyeong/Sa-rang | Goyang Aram Nuri Sara Sae Theater | April 6 to 14 | |
| 2019 | Hot Summer | 뜨거운 여름 | Chae-kyeong/Sa-rang | Yes24 Stage 3 | May 17 to June 30 | |
| 2021 | Little Woman | 작은 아씨들 | Beth | Daehakro Dream Art Center Building 2 | October 9 to 31 | |
| 2022 | The Little Prince - Goyang | 어린왕자— 고양 | Little Prince | Goyang Aram Nuri Sara Sae Theater | June 18 to 26 | |
