= Lee Na-yoon =

South Korean actress (born 2007)

- 이나윤
- Born: July 16, 2007 (age 19); Seo District, Incheon, South Korea
- Occupation: Actress
- Years active: 2014–present
- Agent: SM C&C
- Website: SM C&C Lee Na-yoon

Lee Na-yoon (Korean: 이나윤; born July 16, 2007) is a South Korean actress.

== Education ==
Lee attended Incheon Geomdan Elementary School before transferring to Kamjung Elementary School. She is attending Gamgam Middle School.

== Filmography ==
=== Film ===
Year	Title	Role	Ref.
2018	The Princess and the Matchmaker	Young Man-yi	
2019	Kim Ji-young: Born 1982	Young Kim Eun-young	

=== Television series ===
Year	Title	Role	Ref.
2014	Tell Me, Bong-gu	Na-yoon	
2015	My Daughter, Geum Sa-wol	Young Oh Hye-sang	
2016	Cheese in the Trap	Young Baek In-ha	
2016	Happy Home	Bong Jin-hwa	
2016	Hello, My Twenties!	Young Yoo Eun-jae	
2016	Cinderella with Four Knights	Young Ha-won	
2017	Voice	Sae-bom	
2017	Duel	Jang Soo-yeon	
2018	Hold Me Tight	Kim Saet-byeol, Hyun-joo and Do-young's daughter	
2019	Special Labor Inspector	Jo Jinah	
2019–2020	Unasked Family	Young Hwang Soo-ji	
2021	She Would Never Know	Young Yoon Song-ah	

=== Advertisements ===
- Teacher Yoon's English Class

=== Other ===
Year	Title	Notes	Ref.
2016	Go Exploration Life (Season 1)		
2016	Go Exploration Life (Season 2)		

== Awards and nominations ==
Year	Award	Category	Nominee / Work	Result	Ref.
2016	36th MBC Drama Awards	Best Young Actress	Happy Home	Nominated	
2018	38th MBC Drama Awards	Best Young Actress	Hold Me Tight	Won	
