= Red Balloon (TV series) =

2022–2023 South Korean television series

- Promotional poster
- Hangul: 빨간풍선
- Hanja: 빨간風船
- RR: Ppalgan pungseon
- MR: Ppalgan p'ungsŏn
- Genre: Family drama; Melodrama
- Developed by: Jeong Hwe-seok
- Written by: Moon Young-nam
- Directed by: Jin Hyung-wook; Lee Seung-hoon
- Starring: Seo Ji-hye; Lee Sung-jae; Hong Soo-hyun; Lee Sang-woo; Jung Yoo-min
- Music by: Gaemi
- Country of origin: South Korea
- Original language: Korean
- No. of episodes: 20

Production
- Executive producer: Jeong Hyeong-seo
- Producers: Kim Sang-heon; Kim Seong-min; Park Chae-won; Baek Ji-soo
- Production companies: Chorokbaem Media; Higround
- Budget: ₩13.2 billion

Original release
- Network: TV Chosun
- Release: December 17, 2022 – February 26, 2023

Red Balloon (Korean: 빨간풍선) is a South Korean television series starring Seo Ji-hye, Lee Sung-jae, Hong Soo-hyun, Lee Sang-woo and Jung Yoo-min. It aired on TV Chosun every Saturday and Sunday at 21:10 (KST) from December 17, 2022 to February 26, 2023.

== Synopsis ==
Jo Eun-kang and her circle of friends and relatives wishes to fulfill their goals after having prior setbacks. Together, they find themselves entangled in multiple conflicts and affairs.

== Cast ==
=== Main ===
- Seo Ji-hye as Jo Eun-kang
- Lee Sung-jae as Ji Nam-chul
- Hong Soo-hyun as Han Ba-da
- Lee Sang-woo as Go Cha-won
- Jung Yoo-min as Jo Eun-san

Eun-kang's younger sister.

=== Supporting ===
Eun-kang's family

- Jeong Bo-seok as Jo Dae-bong

Eun-kang's father.

- Lee Bo-hee as Yang Ban-suk

Eun-kang's mother.

- Choi Dae-chul as Jo Dae-geun

Eun-san's uncle.

- Seol Jung-hwan as Kwon Tae-gi

Eun-kang's boyfriend.

- Yoon Ji-sook as Lee Ji-ok

Dae-geun's ex-wife.

Ba-da's family

- Yoon Joo-sang as Go Mul-sang

Ba-da's father-in-law.

- Yoon Mi-ra as Na Gong-ju

Ba-da's mother-in-law.

- Kim Hye-sun as Go Geum-ah

Ba-da's sister-in-law.

- Lee Sang-sook as Yeo Jeon-hee

Ba-da's mother.

- Oh Eun-seo as Go Mi-pung

Cha-won's daughter.

- Jo Yeon-ho as Ji Woon

Nam-chul's son.

- Go Na-hee as Ji Cheon

Nam-chul's daughter.

== Original soundtrack ==
=== Part 1 ===
Released on December 25, 2022
No.	Title	Lyrics	Music	Artist	Length
1.	"Red Balloon" (빨간풍선)	Ant; Midnight	Ant; Midnight	Kim Yeon-ji	3:49
2.	"Red Balloon" (빨간풍선; Inst.)		Ant; Midnight		3:49
Total length:					7:38

=== Part 2 ===
Released on January 8, 2023
No.	Title	Lyrics	Music	Artist	Length
1.	"You Mean Everything to Me" (그대만이 내게 전부니까요)	Kim Young-seong; Chanran	Kim Young-seong; Chanran	Beige	3:45
2.	"You Mean Everything to Me" (그대만이 내게 전부니까요; Inst.)		Kim Young-seong; Chanran		3:45
Total length:					7:30

=== Part 3 ===
Released on January 14, 2023
No.	Title	Lyrics	Music	Artist	Length
1.	"Hard to Say I Love You" (사랑 그 말은 못하고)	Ant; Midnight	Ant; Midnight	Zia	4:05
2.	"Hard to Say I Love You" (사랑 그 말은 못하고; Inst.)		Ant; Midnight		4:05
Total length:					8:10

=== Part 4 ===
Released on January 28, 2023
No.	Title	Lyrics	Music	Artist	Length
1.	"Lovers" (연인)	Kim Shin-woo	Kim Shin-woo; Choi Sang-eon; Kim Hong-jun	Ali	4:10
2.	"Lovers" (연인; Inst.)		Kim Shin-woo; Choi Sang-eon; Kim Hong-jun		4:10
Total length:					8:20

=== Part 5 ===
Released on February 4, 2023
No.	Title	Lyrics	Music	Artist	Length
1.	"Cut Off Love" (사랑을 끊었다)	Choi Han-sol	Choi Han-sol	Kim Dong-hyun	3:12
2.	"Cut Off Love" (사랑을 끊었다; Inst.)		Choi Han-sol		3:12
Total length:					6:24

=== Part 6 ===
Released on February 11, 2023
No.	Title	Lyrics	Music	Artist	Length
1.	"Thirsty for Love" (사랑에 목마르다)	Gabwon Choi	Ant	GUNJI	3:48
2.	"Thirsty for Love" (사랑에 목마르다; Inst.)		Ant		3:47
Total length:					7:25

=== Part 7 ===
Released on February 18, 2023
No.	Title	Lyrics	Music	Artist	Length
1.	"Live in my heart" (내 가슴에 살아)	Gabwon Choi	Ant	Jung Dong-ha	3:58
2.	"Live in my heart" (내 가슴에 살아; Inst.)		Ant		3:58
Total length:					8:06

== Viewership ==
Red Balloon : South Korea viewers per episode (millions)

Season	Episode number																				Average
Season	1	2	3	4	5	6	7	8	9	10	11	12	13	14	15	16	17	18	19	20	Average
1	0.752	0.889	1.052	1.276	1.139	1.483	1.219	1.489	1.363	1.565	1.428	1.634	1.579	1.668	1.887	1.896	1.893	2.038	2.073	2.457	1.539

Source: Audience measurement performed nationwide by Nielsen Korea.

Average TV viewership ratings
Ep.	Original broadcast date	Average audience share (Nielsen Korea)	
Ep.	Original broadcast date	Nationwide	Seoul
1	December 17, 2022	3.742% (2nd)	3.554% (2nd)
2	December 18, 2022	4.530% (3rd)	4.049% (4th)
3	December 24, 2022	5.083% (4th)	4.545% (4th)
4	December 25, 2022	6.140% (2nd)	5.303% (2nd)
5	December 31, 2022	5.771% (2nd)	5.402% (2nd)
6	January 1, 2023	7.032% (1st)	6.321% (1st)
7	January 7, 2023	6.130% (1st)	5.833% (1st)
8	January 8, 2023	6.916% (1st)	6.035% (1st)
9	January 14, 2023	6.713% (1st)	5.555% (2nd)
10	January 15, 2023	7.702% (2nd)	6.612% (2nd)
11	January 28, 2023	6.992% (2nd)	5.743% (2nd)
12	January 29, 2023	7.913% (2nd)	7.044% (2nd)
13	February 4, 2023	7.561% (2nd)	6.790% (2nd)
14	February 5, 2023	8.082% (2nd)	7.121% (2nd)
15	February 11, 2023	8.865% (2nd)	8.036% (2nd)
16	February 12, 2023	9.478% (2nd)	8.539% (2nd)
17	February 18, 2023	8.905% (2nd)	7.708% (2nd)
18	February 19, 2023	10.057% (2nd)	9.236% (2nd)
19	February 25, 2023	10.242% (2nd)	8.733% (2nd)
20	February 26, 2023	11.566% (2nd)	10.066% (2nd)
Average		7.471%	6.611%
In the table above, the blue numbers represent the lowest ratings and the red numbers represent the highest ratings.; In the table above, the ratings listed is the highest ratings for each episode.; This drama aired on a cable channel/pay TV which normally has a relatively smaller audience compared to free-to-air TV/public broadcasters (KBS, SBS, MBC, and EBS).
