= Happy Home (TV series) =

2016 South Korean television series

- Promotional poster
- Also known as: Bong's Happy Restaurant
- Genre: Family; Romantic drama
- Written by: Jo Eun-jeong
- Directed by: Lee Dong-yoon; Kang In
- Starring: Kim Yeong-cheol; Won Mi-kyung; Kim So-yeon; Lee Sang-woo; Lee Pil-mo
- Country of origin: South Korea
- No. of episodes: 51

Production
- Executive producer: Kim Yang
- Producer: Yoo Hyun-jong
- Running time: 75 minutes
- Production company: Story Plant (Note: Now Mega Monster, a joint venture of kakao M and Studio Dragon)

Original release
- Network: MBC
- Release: February 27 – August 21, 2016

Happy Home (Korean: 가화만사성; RR: Gahwamansaseong) is a 2016 South Korean television series starring Kim Yeong-cheol, Won Mi-kyung, Kim So-yeon, Lee Sang-woo and Lee Pil-mo. It aired on MBC every Saturdays to Sundays at 20:45 (KST) for 51 episodes from February 27 to August 21, 2016.

== Cast ==
=== Main cast ===
- Kim Yeong-cheol as Bong Sam-bong
  - Park Min-sang as child Sam-bong
  - Park Hoon as young Sam-bong
- Won Mi-kyung as Bae Sook-nyeo
  - Lee Bom as young Sook-nyeo
- Kim So-yeon as Bong Hae-ryung
- Lee Sang-woo as Seo Ji-geon
- Lee Pil-mo as Yoo Hyun-gi

=== Bong's family ===
- Kim Ji-ho as Han Mi-soon
- Jang In-sub as Bong Man-ho
- Choi Yoon-so as Bong Hae-won
- Ji Soo-won as Bong Sam-sook
  - Song hee-soo as child Sam-sook
- Yoon Da-hoon as Bong Sam-sik
  - Park Seung-joon as child Sam-sik
- So Hee-jeong as Oh Min-jeong
- Lee Na-yoon as Bong Jin-hwa
- Kim Sa-rang as Bong Seon-hwa
- Yoon Seok-ho as Bong Sam-goo

=== People around Seo Ji-geon ===
- Nam Myung-ryul as Seo Do-hyung
- Jeon Jin-seo as Seo Young-woo
- Park Min-woo as Lee Kang-min
- Park Ji-il as Lee Seok-ho
- Seo Kyung-hwa as Kim In-sook

=== People around Yoo Hyun-gi ===
- Seo Yi-sook as Jang Kyung-ok
- Lee So-jung as Lee Young-eun

=== Happy Home ===
- Yoon Jin-yi as Joo Se-ri
- Ahn Hyo-seop as Choi Cheol-soo / Kang Joon-young
- Park Jin-woo
- Kang Yi-eun as Hong Ji-sook
- Lee Gyu-jeong as Ahn Cho-rong

=== Extended cast ===
- Kim Nan-hwi as Ahn Mi-na
- Ahn Nae-sang as Kim Min-seok
- Gong Jae-won
- Jung Yoo-min as Ji Soo (Yoo Hyun-gi's blind date)
- Seo Young-tak as Ji Soo's father
- Kang Min-jeong as female reporter
- Son Seon-geun
- Seo Ji-yeon
- Yoon Hee-won as section head Kim Sung-hoon
- Kim Jeong-soo as Bae Sook-nyeo's boxing trainer
- Choi Min-geum
- Lee Gwang-se
- Son Young-soon
- Jo Sung-hee
- Gil Jeong-woo as Yoo Seo-jin
- Seo Gwang-jae
- Choo Gwi-jeong
- Kim Ik-tae
- Seo Bo-ik
- Yoo Jang-young
- Jeon Hae-ryong
- Jeon Jin-gi
- Ahn Sung-geon
- Kwon Hong-seok
- Bae Gi-beom
- Kang Dong-yeop
- Yoo Geum
- Han Yeo-wool
- Min Dae-sik
- Joo Boo-jin
- Lee Dal
- Lee Jin-mok
- Lee Woong-hee
- Lee Hee-seok
- Choi Ri-ho
- Yoo Pil-ran
- Song Kyung-hwa
- Seol Ji-yoon
- Goo Bon-seok
- Ham Jin-sung
- Cha Sang-mi
- Son Jeong-rim
- Gi Yeon-ho as elementary school's director
- Choi Han-byul
- Ban Hye-ra
- Kwon Tae-jin
- Kim Hyun
- Kim Kwang-hyun
- Jang Moon-gyu
- Han Choon-il
- Lee Hyung-goo
- Choi Young-jin
- Jung Young-do
- Choi Seo-hoo
- Kang Chan-yang
- Kwon Oh-soo
- Byun Geon-woo
- Geum Gwang-san
- Dang Hyun-seok
- Im Sung-pyo
- Kim Tae-rang
- Jung Ah-mi
- Yoo Ok-joo
- Moon Ah-ram
- Lee Byung-cheol
- Park Byung-wook
- Kim Woo-hyuk as Kim Jin-young
- Ahn Gi-young
- Eun Seo-yool
- Seok Bo-bae
- Im Se-won

=== Cameo appearances ===
- Daniel Lindemann as German customer
- Voiture

== Ratings ==
In the table below, the blue numbers represent the lowest ratings and the red numbers represent the highest ratings.

| Episode # | Original broadcast date | Average audience share | | | |
| Episode # | Original broadcast date | TNmS Ratings | | AGB Nielsen Ratings | |
| Episode # | Original broadcast date | Nationwide | Seoul National Capital Area | Nationwide | Seoul National Capital Area |
|---|---|---|---|---|---|
| 1 | February 27, 2016 | 14.4% | 14.1% | 14.8% | 16.4% |
| 2 | February 28, 2016 | 16.1% | 16.6% | 17.6% | 18.8% |
| 3 | March 5, 2016 | 14.1% | 14.4% | 13.3% | 14.5% |
| 4 | March 6, 2016 | 14.3% | 14.8% | 15.7% | 16.5% |
| 5 | March 12, 2016 | 12.5% | 12.3% | 12.7% | 12.9% |
| 6 | March 13, 2016 | 13.7% | 14.0% | 14.6% | 15.6% |
| 7 | March 19, 2016 | 13.6% | 13.8% | 15.1% | 16.8% |
| 8 | March 20, 2016 | 13.7% | 13.8% | 14.9% | 15.3% |
| 9 | March 26, 2016 | 12.0% | 12.2% | 13.3% | 14.6% |
| 10 | March 27, 2016 | 13.4% | 13.5% | 14.4% | 15.1% |
| 11 | April 2, 2016 | 13.2% | 13.6% | 13.2% | 14.2% |
| 12 | April 3, 2016 | 13.9% | 14.5% | 15.4% | 16.9% |
| 13 | April 9, 2016 | 12.7% | 13.7% | 13.0% | 15.0% |
| 14 | April 10, 2016 | 13.4% | 13.6% | 14.2% | 15.7% |
| 15 | April 16, 2016 | 12.3% | 12.5% | 13.6% | 14.8% |
| 16 | April 17, 2016 | 13.8% | 14.3% | 13.6% | 15.1% |
| 17 | April 23, 2016 | 13.0% | 13.2% | 12.7% | 13.9% |
| 18 | April 24, 2016 | 16.0% | 17.0% | 15.4% | 16.7% |
| 19 | April 30, 2016 | 13.4% | 13.1% | 15.2% | 16.8% |
| 20 | May 1, 2016 | 15.8% | 15.9% | 16.3% | 17.4% |
| 21 | May 7, 2016 | 13.7% | 14.3% | 13.7% | 14.7% |
| 22 | May 8, 2016 | 15.6% | 15.5% | 16.8% | 18.1% |
| 23 | May 14, 2016 | 15.2% | 15.7% | 15.8% | 16.7% |
| 24 | May 15, 2016 | 17.0% | 17.9% | 18.0% | 19.7% |
| 25 | May 21, 2016 | 14.3% | 14.6% | 15.1% | 16.2% |
| 26 | May 22, 2016 | 16.5% | 16.2% | 17.4% | 18.4% |
| 27 | May 28, 2016 | 14.9% | 14.0% | 14.7% | 15.3% |
| 28 | May 29, 2016 | 16.1% | 15.9% | 16.5% | 18.0% |
| 29 | June 4, 2016 | 15.2% | 15.8% | 14.8% | 15.9% |
| 30 | June 5, 2016 | 16.8% | 17.6% | 16.8% | 18.3% |
| 31 | June 11, 2016 | 14.8% | 14.5% | 14.8% | 16.3% |
| 32 | June 12, 2016 | 15.5% | 15.4% | 17.1% | 18.8% |
| 33 | June 18, 2016 | 14.4% | 15.5% | 15.3% | 16.9% |
| 34 | June 19, 2016 | 16.7% | 17.5% | 18.0% | 18.9% |
| 35 | June 25, 2016 | 14.0% | 14.9% | 14.8% | 16.0% |
| 36 | June 26, 2016 | 16.7% | 17.4% | 17.5% | 18.4% |
| 37 | July 2, 2016 | 15.6% | 15.2% | 16.0% | 16.1% |
| 38 | July 3, 2016 | 17.3% | 17.2% | 19.3% | 20.1% |
| 39 | July 9, 2016 | 16.9% | 16.3% | 17.5% | 18.4% |
| 40 | July 10, 2016 | 17.8% | 17.0% | 17.2% | 18.4% |
| 41 | July 16, 2016 | 16.2% | 16.6% | 16.7% | 18.2% |
| 42 | July 17, 2016 | 17.9% | 17.4% | 18.9% | 20.0% |
| 43 | July 23, 2016 | 17.0% | 16.4% | 15.9% | 17.0% |
| 44 | July 24, 2016 | 18.4% | 17.4% | 18.9% | 19.8% |
| 45 | July 30, 2016 | 16.5% | 17.6% | 15.5% | 16.2% |
| 46 | July 31, 2016 | 17.1% | 17.0% | 17.3% | 18.2% |
| 47 | August 7, 2016 | 15.2% | 14.8% | 14.5% | 15.3% |
| 48 | August 13, 2016 | 21.1% | 20.9% | 20.4% | 21.0% |
| 49 | August 14, 2016 | 19.0% | 18.3% | 17.6% | 18.6% |
| 50 | August 20, 2016 | 17.7% | 15.7% | 17.4% | 18.3% |
| 51 | August 21, 2016 | 18.6% | 19.1% | 17.5% | 18.0% |
| Average | | 15.39% | 15.50% | 15.82% | 16.93% |

== Original soundtracks ==
=== OST Part 1 ===
| No. | Title | Artist | Length |
|---|---|---|---|
| 1. | "Vanity (세상만사)" | No Brain | 3:25 |
| 2. | "Vanity (세상만사)" (Inst.) | | 3:25 |
| Total length: | | | 6:50 |

=== OST Part 2 ===
| No. | Title | Artist | Length |
|---|---|---|---|
| 1. | "Gosh I Don't Know (에라 모르겠다)" | Norazo | 3:15 |
| 2. | "Gosh I Don't Know (에라 모르겠다)" (Inst.) | | 3:15 |
| Total length: | | | 6:30 |

=== OST Part 3 ===
| No. | Title | Artist | Length |
|---|---|---|---|
| 1. | "Evidence (흔적)" | Zion | 3:38 |
| 2. | "Evidence (흔적)" (Inst.) | | 3:38 |
| Total length: | | | 7:16 |

=== OST Part 4 ===
| No. | Title | Artist | Length |
|---|---|---|---|
| 1. | "Say Love (사랑한다고 말해요)" | Seungho (MBLAQ) | 3:59 |
| 2. | "Say Love (사랑한다고 말해요)" (Inst.) | | 3:59 |
| Total length: | | | 7:58 |

=== OST Part 5 ===
| No. | Title | Artist | Length |
|---|---|---|---|
| 1. | "Sweet Life (달콤한 인생)" | Jo Jeong-min | 3:28 |
| 2. | "Sweet Life (달콤한 인생)" (Inst.) | | 3:28 |
| Total length: | | | 6:56 |

=== OST Part 6 ===
| No. | Title | Artist | Length |
|---|---|---|---|
| 1. | "Sick (아프다)" | Oh Hyun-ran | 3:58 |
| 2. | "Sick (아프다)" (Inst.) | | 3:58 |
| Total length: | | | 7:56 |

== Awards and nominations ==
| Year | Award | Category | Recipient | Result |
|---|---|---|---|---|
| 2016 | 5th APAN Star Awards | Top Excellence Award, Actress in a Serial Drama | Kim So-yeon | Won |
| 2016 | 5th APAN Star Awards | Excellence Award, Actor in a Serial Drama | Lee Pil-mo | Won |
| 2016 | 5th APAN Star Awards | Excellence Award, Actress in a Serial Drama | Won Mi-kyung | Nominated |
| 2016 | 9th Korea Drama Awards | Grand Prize (Daesang) | Kim So-yeon | Won |
| 2016 | 9th Korea Drama Awards | Star of the Year Award | Kim So-yeon | Won |
| 2016 | 36th MBC Drama Awards | Grand Prize (Daesang) | Kim So-yeon | Nominated |
| 2016 | 36th MBC Drama Awards | Drama of the Year | Happy Home | Nominated |
| 2016 | 36th MBC Drama Awards | Top Excellence Award, Actor in a Serial Drama | Lee Sang-woo | Won |
| 2016 | 36th MBC Drama Awards | Top Excellence Award, Actor in a Serial Drama | Kim Yeong-cheol | Nominated |
| 2016 | 36th MBC Drama Awards | Top Excellence Award, Actress in a Serial Drama | Kim So-yeon | Won |
| 2016 | 36th MBC Drama Awards | Top Excellence Award, Actress in a Serial Drama | Won Mi-kyung | Nominated |
| 2016 | 36th MBC Drama Awards | Golden Acting Award, Actor in a Serial Drama | Lee Pil-mo | Won |
| 2016 | 36th MBC Drama Awards | Golden Acting Award, Actress in a Serial Drama | Kim Ji-ho | Won |
| 2016 | 36th MBC Drama Awards | Golden Acting Award, Actress in a Serial Drama | Seo Yi-sook | Nominated |
| 2016 | 36th MBC Drama Awards | Best New Actor | Ahn Hyo-seop | Nominated |
| 2016 | 36th MBC Drama Awards | Best New Actor | Jang In-sub | Nominated |
| 2016 | 36th MBC Drama Awards | Best New Actress | Choi Yoon-so | Nominated |
| 2016 | 36th MBC Drama Awards | Best Young Actress | Lee Na-yoon | Nominated |
| 2016 | 36th MBC Drama Awards | Best Couple Award | Lee Sang-woo and Kim So-yeon | Nominated |
| 2016 | 36th MBC Drama Awards | Best Couple Award | Lee Pil-mo and Kim So-yeon | Nominated |
