= Oh Min-suk =

South Korean actor (born 1980)

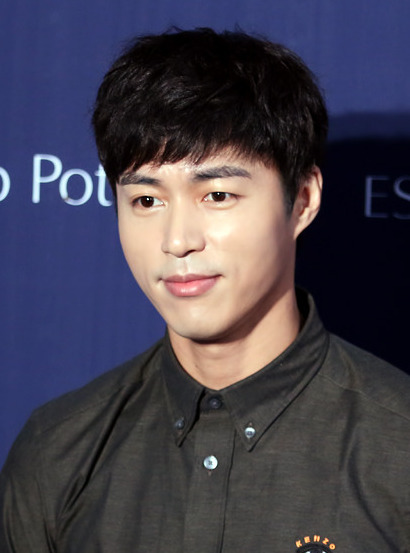
- Oh in 2015
- Born: April 22, 1980 (age 46); Seoul, South Korea
- Education: Kyung Hee University – Business Administration
- Occupation: Actor
- Years active: 2006–present
- Agent: J-Wide Company

Korean name
- Hangul: 오민석
- Hanja: 吳閔碩
- RR: O Minseok
- MR: O Minsŏk

Stage name
- Hangul: 한기주
- Hanja: 韓基柱
- RR: Han Giju
- MR: Han Kiju

Oh Min-suk (born April 22, 1980) is a South Korean actor. He was known by his ex-stage name Han Ki-joo.

== Filmography ==
=== Film ===
Year	Title	Role	Notes/Ref.
2006	Cruel Winter Blues	Man playing musical instrument at 61st birthday party	cameo
2007	Zig Zag Love	Min-sung	
2009	Hello My Love	Yoo Won-jae	
2011	Sector 7	Yoon Hyun-woo	
2013	Do You Hear She Sings?	Kyung-ho	
2014	Virgin Theory: 7 Steps to Get On the Top	Kang Ki-tae	
2015	Love Clinic	Owner of foreign car	cameo
2016	Proof of Innocence	Cha Jin-seok	
2017	Road Kill	Min-cheol	
2019	The Culprit	Kim Joon-sung	
2022	Limit	Lee Cheol-woo	

=== Television series ===
Year	Title	Role	Notes/Ref.
2006	I'll Go With You	Kwang-soo	
2006	Love and Hate	Park Seung-pyo	
2007	Thirty Thousand Miles in Search of My Son	Kang Seung-ho	
2008	My Precious You	Baek Jae-ra's teacher	
2009	Joseon Mystery Detective Jung Yak-yong	Hwang Young	Cameo (Episode 7)
2010	Chosun Police 3	Cha Geon-woo	
2011	Pit-a-pat, My Love	Jung Do-hyung	
2011	Special Affairs Team TEN	Kim Sun-woo	Cameo (Episode 4)
2012	I Do, I Do	Jake Han	
2012	One Thousandth Man	Min-suk	Cameo (Episode 1)
2012	Ugly Cake	Oh Tae-soo	
2013	Nine	Kang Seo-joon	
2014	Cheo Yong	Kang Han-tae	Cameo (Episode 10)
2014	God's Gift: 14 Days	Yoon Jae-han	
2014	Gunman in Joseon	Min Young-ik	
2014	Misaeng: Incomplete Life	Kang Hae-joon	
2015	Misaengmul	Kang Hae-joon	Cameo (Episode 1)
2015	Kill Me, Heal Me	Cha Ki-joon	
2015	All About My Mom	Lee Hyung-gyu	
2016	Secrets of Women	Yoo Kang-woo	
2017	The King in Love	Song In	
2018	Queen of Mystery 2	Gye Sung-Woo	
2019–2020	Beautiful Love, Wonderful Life	Do Jin-woo	
2020–2021	Cheat on Me If You Can	Ma Dong-kyun	
2022	It's Beautiful Now	Lee Yun-jae	
2022	The Law Cafe	Baek Geon-man	Cameo (Episode 14)
2024	Queen of Divorce	Noh Yul Seong	

=== Web series ===
Year	Title	Role	Ref.
2022	The King of Pigs	Kang Min	

=== Television shows ===
Year	Title	Role	Notes/Ref.
2015	We Got Married – Season 4	Cast member	with Kang Ye-won (Episodes 276–310)
2016	Suspicious Vacation	Cast member	with Jeon Seok-ho (Episodes 3–4)
2017	King of Mask Singer	Contestant	as "Einstein" (Episode 123)
2020–present	My Little Old Boy	Special cast	Episode 178–present
2023	Untangodo Village Hotel	Cast Member	season 2

=== Music video appearances ===
Year	Song title	Artist	Ref.
2021	"Be My Lover"	Kim Jong-kook X Ateez	

== Awards and nominations ==
Year	Award	Category	Nominated work	Result
2015	15th MBC Entertainment Awards	Popularity Award for Variety Show	We Got Married	Won
2015	15th MBC Entertainment Awards	Best Couple (with Kang Ye-won)	We Got Married	Nominated
2015	4th APAN Star Awards	Best Dressed	All About My Mom	Won
2015	KBS Drama Awards	Best Supporting Actor	All About My Mom	Nominated
2015	KBS Drama Awards	Best Couple (with Son Yeo-eun)	All About My Mom	Nominated
2016	KBS Drama Awards	Excellence Award, Actor in a Daily Drama	Secrets of Women	Won
2017	MBC Drama Awards	Excellence Award, Actor in a Monday-Tuesday Drama	The King in Love	Nominated
2019	KBS Drama Awards	Excellence Award, Actor in a Serial Drama	Beautiful Love, Wonderful Life	Won
2020	14th SBS Entertainment Awards	Rookie Award	My Little Old Boy	Won
2020	34th KBS Drama Awards	Best Actor in a One-Act/Special/Short Drama	Drama Special – The Joys and Sorrows of Work	Nominated
2021	15th SBS Entertainment Awards	Grand Prize (Daesang) (Note: with Shin Dong-yup, Seo Jang-hoon, Cho Hye-seon, Kim Sun-ja, Park Young-hye, Lee Sang-min, Tak Jae-hoon, Im Won-hee, Kim Joon-ho, Kim Jong-kook, Kim Hee-chul, Lee Tae-sung, Park Goon, Choi Jin-hyuk)	My Little Old Boy	Won
2022	8th APAN Star Awards	Excellence Award, Actor in a Serial Drama	It's Beautiful Now	Nominated
2022	KBS Drama Awards	Best Supporting Actor	It's Beautiful Now	Nominated
