= Angel's Last Mission: Love =

South Korean television series

- Promotional poster
- Hangul: 단, 하나의 사랑
- Lit.: Dan, Only Love
- RR: Dan, hanaui sarang
- MR: Tan, hanaŭi sarang
- Genre: Romance; Fantasy
- Developed by: KBS Drama Production
- Written by: Choi Yoon-kyo
- Directed by: Lee Jung-sub
- Starring: Shin Hye-sun; Kim Myung-soo; Lee Dong-gun; Kim Bo-mi; Do Ji-won; Kim In-kwon
- Country of origin: South Korea
- Original language: Korean
- No. of episodes: 32 (Note: In order to circumvent Korean laws that prevent commercial breaks in the middle of an episode, what would previously have been aired as single 70 minute episodes are now being repackaged as two 35 minute episodes, with two episodes being shown each night with a commercial break between the two.)

Production
- Executive producers: Jo Yoon-jung; Jung Hae-ryung
- Camera setup: Single-camera
- Running time: 35 minutes
- Production companies: Victory Contents; Monster Union

Original release
- Network: KBS2
- Release: May 22 – July 11, 2019

Angel's Last Mission: Love (Korean: 단, 하나의 사랑) is a 2019 South Korean television series starring Shin Hye-sun, Kim Myung-soo, Lee Dong-gun, Kim Bo-mi, Do Ji-won, and Kim In-kwon. It aired on KBS2 every Wednesday and Thursday at 22:00 (KST) from May 22 to July 11, 2019.

== Synopsis ==
Lee Yeon-seo (Shin Hye-sun) is a talented and successful ballerina who can say anything that she wants with her family's Fantasia Ballet Company, but suffers a devastating accident while performing on stage that leaves her blind. She is bitter and abusive towards her staff, including her loyal secretary and butler, as well as her sly family. Dan (Kim Myung-soo) is an optimistic, carefree angel who is always getting into trouble. Wanting to return to heaven, he seems to be given the impossible mission of finding true love for Yeon-seo, but ends up falling for her himself.

== Cast ==
=== Main ===
- Shin Hye-sun as Lee Yeon-seo/Choi Seol-hee/Giselle, a ballerina who has never believed in love. She is abusive to her staff until Dan sent them off, even though she ordered them not to leave.
- Kim Myung-soo as Dan/Kim Dan/Yoo Seong-woo

An angel who can return to Heaven only if his mission is a success.

- Lee Dong-gun as Ji Kang-woo, Yeon-seo's mentor as well as her ballet instructor. He is a fallen angel who is initially obsessed with her as she is his dead lover's doppelganger, but eventually falls in love with her.
- Kim Bo-mi as Nina Geum, Yeon-seo's cousin, who is also a ballerina, and has a crush on Kang-woo.
- Do Ji-won as Choi Yeong-ja

Ni-na's mother, director of the Fantasia Ballet. A greedy woman who will stop at nothing to get what she wants.

- Kim In-kwon as Hu, an archangel that gives missions to Dan.

=== Supporting ===
- Lee Ye-na as Hwang Jeong-eun
- Woo Hee-jin as Chung Yu-mi
- Lee Hwa-ryong as Park Gyeong-il
- Gil Eun-hye as Geum Ru-na

Runa is Yeon-seo's cousin, who will do anything to get her sister what she wants. She is even more devious in her machinations than her mother.

- Kim Seung-wook as Geum Ki-chun
- Lee Je-yun as Ki Joon-soo
- Kim Yi-kyung as Gi Bo-ra
- Jo Sung-hyun as Ko Sung-min
- Park Won-sang as ballet company director

=== Special appearances ===
- Jang Hyun-sung as Cho Seung-wan (Ep. 1–2)
- Kim Ki-moo as dog stealer (Ep. 1)
- Lee Se-na as Yeon-seo's mother (Ep. 2) (Na Hui-su)
- Lee Seok-jun as Yeon-seo's father (Ep. 2) (Lee Jin-ung)
- Park Sang-myun (Ep. 2, 7, 9, 11–12)

== Production ==
The first script reading took place on January 18, 2019, at KBS Annex Broadcasting Station in Yeouido, South Korea.

== Original soundtrack ==
Soundtrack album by Various artists
- Recorded: 2019
- Genre: Soundtrack
- Languages: Korean; English
- Labels: Kakao M Victory Contents

=== Part 1 ===
Released on May 22, 2019
No.	Title	Lyrics	Music	Artist	Length
1.	"A Welcome Rain" (단비)	Kim Jong-cheon	Lovelyee; Kim Jong-cheon	Lee Moon-sae	4:48
2.	"A Welcome Rain" (Inst.)		Lovelyee; Kim Jong-cheon		4:48
Total length:					9:36

=== Part 2 ===
Released on May 30, 2019
No.	Title	Lyrics	Music	Artist	Length
1.	"Oh My Angel"	Kim Ji-won	Kim Ji-won; Seok Hye-min; Kim Seong-eun	Chai	3:59
2.	"Oh My Angel" (Inst.)		Kim Ji-won; Seok Hye-min; Kim Seong-eun		3:59
Total length:					7:58

=== Part 3 ===
Released on June 5, 2019
No.	Title	Lyrics	Music	Artist	Length
1.	"The Nights That I Miss You" (널 그리는 밤)	Hui Jang-nim; Lovelyee; Rocket Dan	Hui Jang-nim; Lovelyee; Rocket Dan	L (Infinite)	4:22
2.	"The Nights That I Miss You" (Inst.)		Hui Jang-nim; Lovelyee; Rocket Dan		4:22
Total length:					8:44

=== Part 4 ===
Released on June 13, 2019
No.	Title	Lyrics	Music	Artist	Length
1.	"Because of You"	Noheul; Krazy Park	Noheul; Krazy Park	Huh Gak	4:16
2.	"Because of You" (Inst.)		Noheul; Krazy Park		4:16
Total length:					8:32

=== Part 5 ===
Released on June 19, 2019
No.	Title	Lyrics	Music	Artist	Length
1.	"Stay"	Hui Jang-nim; Choi In-hee	Hui Jang-nim; Choi In-hee; Yoo Young-jun	O.WHEN	4:11
2.	"Stay" (Inst.)		Hui Jang-nim; Choi In-hee; Yoo Young-jun		4:11
Total length:					8:22

=== Part 6 ===
Released on June 26, 2019
No.	Title	Lyrics	Music	Artist	Length
1.	"In Your Light" (너란 빛으로)	Fromm	Fromm; Kwon Young-chan	Fromm	4:07
2.	"In Your Light" (Inst.)		Fromm; Kwon Young-chan		4:07
Total length:					8:14

=== Part 7 ===
Released on July 3, 2019
No.	Title	Lyrics	Music	Artist	Length
1.	"Scent" (향기)	Hani	Tom and Jerry; Lee Dong-hyun	So-jung (Ladies' Code)	3:27
2.	"Pray"	Hodge; Hee Jang-nim; Lovelyee	Hee Jang-nim; Lovelyee	KLANG	4:12
3.	"Scent" (Inst.)		Tom and Jerry; Lee Dong-hyun		3:27
4.	"Pray" (Inst.)		Hee Jang-nim; Lovelyee		4:12
Total length:					15:18

=== Classic OST ===
Released on July 4, 2019
No.	Title	Artist	Length
1.	"Tchaikovsky: Swan Lake, Op.20 - Act II. By A Lake: No.13 Dances Of The Swans - VII. Coda: Allegro Vivace" ([1부] 차이코프스키: 백조의 호수 - 2막. 13번 백조들의 춤 - 콛)	Mikhail Pletnev	1:51
2.	"Tchaikovsky: Swan Lake, Op.20 - Act IV. By The Lake: No.28 Finale: Andante - Allegro Agitato - Moderato E Maestoso - Moderato" ([1부] 차이코프스키: 백조의 호수 - 4막. 28번 피날레)	Mikhail Pletnev	6:35
3.	"Adam: Giselle - Act I. Finale Du 1er Acte Et Scene De Folie" ([10부] 아당: 지젤 - 1막. 1막의 피날레와 광란의 장면)	Andrew Mogrella	2:06
4.	"Adam: Giselle - Act II. Entree D'Hilarion" ([11부] 아당: 지젤 - 2막. 일라리옹의 입장)	Andrew Mogrella	2:25
5.	"Adam: Giselle - Act II. Entree De Loys - Pas De Deux" ([10부] 아당: 지젤 - 2막. 로이스의 입장 - 파드되)	Neville Marriner	2:22
6.	"Adam: Giselle - Act II. Finale" ([7부] 아당: 지젤 - 4막. 피날레)	Neville Marriner	2:11
7.	"Tchaikovsky: Swan Lake, Op.20 - Act II. By A Lake: No.13 Dances Of The Swans - II. Moderato Assai" ([2부] 차이코프스키: 백조의 호수 - 2막. 13번 백조들의 춤 - 모데라토 아사이)	Neeme Järvi	2:29
8.	"Minkus: Don Quixote - Act I. Don Quixote Invites Quiteria To A Minuet" ([6부] 밍쿠스: 돈키호테 - 1막. 돈키호테가 키테리아를 미뉴엣에 초대)	Nayden Todorov	2:10
9.	"Minkus: Don Quixote - Act I. Basilio With Friends" ([6부] 밍쿠스: 돈키호테 - 1막. 바실리오와 친구들)	Nayden Todorov	2:02
10.	"Delibes: Coppelia Ballet Suite - Act II. Music Of The Automata And Waltz" ([1부] 들리브: 코펠리아 발레 모음곡 - 2막. 오토마타의 음악과 왈츠)	Heinz Fricke	1:58

== Viewership ==
Angel's Last Mission: Love : South Korea viewers per episode (millions)

Episodes	Episode number															
Episodes	1	2	3	4	5	6	7	8	9	10	11	12	13	14	15	16
Ep.1–16	1.143	1.437	1.086	1.396	1.211	1.408	1.148	1.431	0.987	1.217	1.201	1.548	1.036	1.215	1.133	1.330
Ep.17–32	1.120	1.282	1.039	1.235	1.059	1.275	0.962	1.165	0.882	1.065	0.998	1.181	1.070	1.230	0.797	1.153

Source: Audience measurement performed nationwide by Nielsen Media Research.

Average TV viewership ratings
Ep.	Original broadcast date	Average audience share		
Ep.	Original broadcast date	Nielsen Korea		TNmS
Ep.	Original broadcast date	Nationwide	Seoul	Nationwide
1	May 22, 2019	7.3% (8th)	7.7% (7th)	7.3%
2	May 22, 2019	9.2% (6th)	9.5% (5th)	7.7%
3	May 23, 2019	6.6% (12th)	7.5% (7th)	6.3%
4	May 23, 2019	8.6% (6th)	8.9% (4th)	7.2%
5	May 29, 2019	8.2% (8th)	8.6% (5th)	7.4%
6	May 29, 2019	9.4% (6th)	9.7% (3rd)	8.8%
7	May 30, 2019	6.7% (15th)	6.8% (12th)	6.5%
8	May 30, 2019	8.4% (8th)	8.7% (4th)	7.8%
9	June 5, 2019	6.7% (11th)	6.9% (10th)	5.9%
10	June 5, 2019	7.9% (6th)	8.3% (5th)	7.4%
11	June 6, 2019	6.9% (12th)	7.7% (11th)	6.9%
12	June 6, 2019	8.7% (5th)	9.7% (5th)	7.5%
13	June 12, 2019	6.3% (12th)	6.6% (11th)	6.6%
14	June 12, 2019	7.3% (8th)	7.3% (9th)	7.6%
15	June 13, 2019	7.0% (11th)	7.2% (10th)	5.9%
16	June 13, 2019	7.8% (8th)	7.9% (7th)	7.5%
17	June 19, 2019	6.8% (11th)	7.0% (10th)	6.1%
18	June 19, 2019	7.9% (7th)	8.0% (7th)	7.0%
19	June 20, 2019	6.5% (13th)	7.4% (9th)	5.3%
20	June 20, 2019	7.9% (6th)	8.3% (7th)	6.6%
21	June 26, 2019	7.6% (9th)	7.7% (9th)	6.1%
22	June 26, 2019	8.1% (6th)	8.5% (7th)	6.7%
23	June 27, 2019	5.8% (16th)	6.6% (13th)	5.1%
24	June 27, 2019	7.1% (11th)	7.9% (9th)	6.2%
25	July 3, 2019	5.5% (17th)	5.8% (15th)	5.6%
26	July 3, 2019	6.6% (9th)	6.8% (9th)	6.0%
27	July 4, 2019	5.8% (15th)	6.3% (13th)	—N/a
28	July 4, 2019	7.2% (8th)	7.4% (7th)	5.1%
29	July 10, 2019	6.8% (16th)	7.6% (10th)	N/A
30	July 10, 2019	7.8% (9th)	8.7% (6th)	N/A
31	July 11, 2019	5.1% (19th)	5.5% (18th)	4.1%
32	July 11, 2019	7.2% (12th)	7.7% (9th)	5.6%
Average		7.3%	7.7%	— (Note: Due to some ratings not recorded, the exact average rating is unknown.)
In the table above, the blue numbers represent the lowest ratings and the red numbers represent the highest ratings.; This drama airs on a cable channel/pay TV which normally has a relatively smaller audience compared to free-to-air TV/public broadcasters (KBS, SBS, MBC and EBS).; N/A denotes that the rating is not known.

== Awards and nominations ==
Year	Award	Category	Recipient	Result	Ref.
2019	12th Korea Drama Awards	Best New Actor	Kim Myung-soo	Nominated	
2019	KBS Drama Awards	Top Excellence Award, Actress	Shin Hye-sun	Won	
2019	KBS Drama Awards	Excellence Award, Actor in a Miniseries	Kim Myung-soo	Nominated	
2019	KBS Drama Awards	Excellence Award, Actress in a Miniseries	Shin Hye-sun	Nominated	
2019	KBS Drama Awards	Best Young Actor	Ko Woo-rim	Nominated	
2019	KBS Drama Awards	Best New Actor	Kim Myung-soo	Won	
2019	KBS Drama Awards	Netizen Award, Actor	Kim Myung-soo	Nominated	
2019	KBS Drama Awards	Netizen Award, Actress	Shin Hye-sun	Nominated	
2019	KBS Drama Awards	Best Couple Award	Kim Myung-soo and Shin Hye-sun	Won	
2019	KBS Drama Awards	K-Drama Hallyu Star	Kim Myung-soo	Won	
