= Jung Yoo-min =

South Korean actress (born 1991)

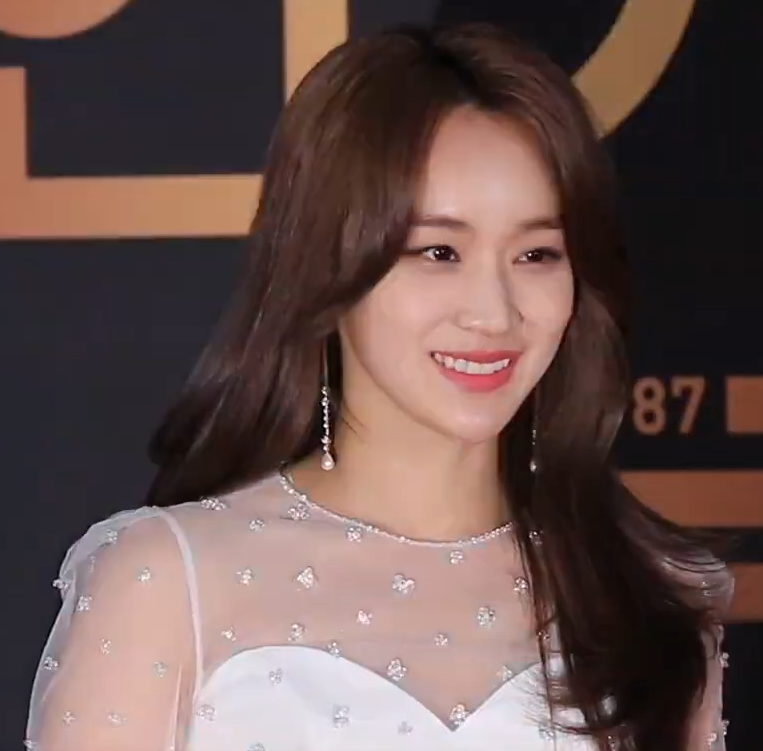
- Jung in 2019
- Born: July 10, 1991 (age 33); South Korea
- Education: Seoul Institute of the Arts – Department of Acting
- Occupation: Actress
- Years active: 2012–present
- Agent: Big Picture
- Spouse: Unknown (m. 2024)
- Children: 1

Korean name
- Hangul: 정유민
- RR: Jeong Yumin
- MR: Chŏng Yumin

Jung Yoo-min (Korean: 정유민; born July 10, 1991) is a South Korean actress.

== Early life ==
Jung Yoo-min was born in South Korea on July 10, 1991. She attended the Seoul Institute of the Arts in the Department of Acting in 2015.

== Personal life ==
On July 10, 2024, Big Picture confirmed that Jung would marry a non-celebrity in August. The couple married on August 23, 2024. Jung announced the birth of her first child on March 11, 2025.

== Filmography ==
=== Film ===
Film appearances
Year	Title	Role	Notes	Ref.
2012	Love Clinique	Sun	Cameo	
2017	The Chase	young Min Young-sook	Bit part	
2018	The Witness	Yoon Hee-won		

=== Television series ===
Television series appearances
Year	Title	Role	Notes	Ref.
2012	Holy Land	Mi Gyung	Cameo	
2012	The Birth of a Family	Jang Mi-hee	Cameo	
2013	Blooded Palace: The War of Flowers	Uhn Nyun		
2014	Gap-dong	Lee Jung-sook	Cameo (Episode 14)	
2014	Steal Heart	Kim Young-mi		
2014	Hi! School: Love On	Kim Joo-ah		
2015	Beating Again	Yoo Yoo-mi		
2015	Reply 1988	Hee Sook	Cameo (Episode 8)	
2015	Remember	Song Ha-young	Cameo	
2016	Happy Home	Ji-soo		
2016	Secret Healer	Hwa-jin		
2016	Hello, My Twenties!	Dancing Student	Cameo	
2016	Love in the Moonlight	Wol-hee		
2016	Entourage	Herself		
2017	Super Family	Lee Tae-yi	Cameo (Episode 12)	
2017	Judge vs. Judge	Hwang Min-ah		
2018	Heart Surgeons	Bae Yoo-ri		
2018	Room No. 9	young Jang Hwa-sa		
2019	Unasked Family	Hwang Soo-ji		
2020	Itaewon Class	Seo Jung-in	Cameo (Episode 6)	
2020–2021	Hospital Playlist	Jung Eun-bin	Cameo (Season 1–2)	
2021	Red Shoes	Kwon Hye-bin		
2022	Twenty-Five Twenty-One	Hwang Bo-mi	Cameo (Episode 1)	
2022	Vengeance of the Bride	Seo Mi-na	Cameo (Episode 6, 10, 27–28)	
2022	Red Balloon	Jo Eun-san		
2023	Perfect Marriage Revenge	Han Yi-joo		
2024	Connection	Choi Ji-yeon		

=== Web series ===
Web series appearances
Year	Title	Role	Ref.
2023	Celebrity	Han Yoo-rang	

=== Music video appearances ===
Music video appearances
Year	Song title	Artist	Ref.
2015	"The Day We Felt Distance" (멀어지던 날)	Cho Kyu-hyun	
2019	"Way Back Home" (퇴근길)	J_ust	

== Awards and nominations ==
Name of the award ceremony, year presented, category, nominee of the award, and the result of the nomination
Award ceremony	Year	Category	Nominee / Work	Result	Ref.
KBS Drama Awards	2019	Best New Actress	Unasked Family	Nominated	
Korea Drama Awards	2023	Hot Star Award	Celebrity	Won	
