= Beautiful Love, Wonderful Life =

2019 South Korean television series

- Promotional poster
- Hangul: 사랑은 뷰티풀 인생은 원더풀
- Lit.: Love Is Beautiful, Life Is Wonderful
- RR: Sarangeun byutipul insaengeun wondeopul
- MR: Sarangŭn pyut'ip'ul insaengŭn wŏndŏp'ul
- Genre: Melodrama; Romantic comedy
- Created by: KBS Drama Production
- Written by: Bae Yoo-mi
- Directed by: Han Joon-seo
- Starring: Seol In-ah; Kim Jae-young; Jo Yoon-hee; Yoon Park; Oh Min-suk
- Composer: Choi In-hee
- Country of origin: South Korea
- Original languages: Korean; Jeju Language
- No. of episodes: 100 (Note: In order to circumvent Korean laws that prevent commercial breaks in the middle of an episode, what would previously have been aired as single 70 minute episodes are now being repackaged as two 35 minute episodes, with two episodes being shown each night with a commercial break between the two.)

Production
- Executive producer: Bae Gyeung-soo (KBS)
- Producers: Choi Sang-yeol; Moon Bo-mi; Lee Eun-jin
- Camera setup: Single-camera
- Running time: 35 minutes
- Production company: HB Entertainment

Original release
- Network: KBS2
- Release: September 28, 2019 – March 22, 2020

Beautiful Love, Wonderful Life (Korean: 사랑은 뷰티풀 인생은 원더풀) is a 2019–2020 South Korean television series starring Seol In-ah, Kim Jae-young, Jo Yoon-hee, Yoon Park and Oh Min-suk. The series aired on KBS2 every Saturday and Sunday from 19:55 to 21:15 (KST) from September 28, 2019, to March 22, 2020.

== Synopsis ==
This is a story about love and deception. The deceptions come in every form - outright lies, obfuscations, failure to speak up, misleading silence, misdirection, rampant insincerity. Against this tidal wave, the main characters fight to find happiness. Their battles never fail to engage.

== Cast ==
=== Main ===
- Seol In-ah as Kim Cheong-ah
- Kim Jae-young as Goo Joon-hwi
- Jo Yoon-hee as Kim Seol-ah
- Yoon Park as Moon Tae-rang
- Oh Min-suk as Do Jin-woo

=== Supporting ===
- Kim Mi-sook as Sunwoo Yeong-ae
- Park Yeong-gyu as Kim Yeong-woong
- Cho Yu-jung as Kim Yeon-ah
  - Ok Ye-rin as (young) Yeon-ah
  - Kwon Eun-bin as Kim Yeon-ah (left the show)
- Na Young-hee as Hong Yoo-ra
- Park Hae-mi as Hong Hwa-yeong
- Jung Won-joong as Moon Joon-ik
- Jo Woo-ri as Moon Hae-rang
- Ryu Ui-hyun as Moon Pa-rang
- Kim Jin-yeop as Baek Rim
- Lee Tae-sun as Kang Shi-wol
- Park Yeong-soo as Na Tae-pyeong
- Lee Soo-mi as Yoo Ra-ne
- Kim Bo-jung as Oh Deok-hee
- Jin Ho-eun as Goo Joon-gyeom

=== Special appearances ===
- Yoo Jae-suk as Happy Together host (Ep. 2)
- Jun Hyun-moo as Happy Together host (Ep. 2)
- Kim Da-som as a mysterious actress (Ep. 3)
- Oh Jung-yeon as Bae Hyeon-ji (Ep. 3)
- Seol Jung-hwan as a reporter

== Original soundtrack ==
=== Part 1 ===
No.	Title	Lyrics	Music	Artist	Length
1.	"123 Love" (123 사랑)	Gamdongis; roz; Ki Hyun-suk	Gamdongis; roz; Ki Hyun-suk	Hello Ga-Young	3:39
2.	"123 Love" (Inst.)		Gamdongis; roz; Ki Hyun-suk		3:39
Total length:					7:18

=== Part 2 ===
No.	Title	Lyrics	Music	Artist	Length
1.	"The Way" (길)	Kim Beom-joo; Kim Si-hyuk; Kang Tae-kyu	Kim Beom-joo; Kim Si-hyuk; Cha Ye-oul	Sohyang	4:59
2.	"The Way" (Inst.)		Kim Beom-joo; Kim Si-hyuk; Cha Ye-oul		4:59
Total length:					9:58

=== Part 3 ===
No.	Title	Lyrics	Music	Artist	Length
1.	"How Can I Do" (어떻게 해)	Park Jung-hee; Kim Seung-jae	Kim Seung-Jae; Park Ga-young; Mo Soo-Jin	Acoustic Collabo	3:21
2.	"How Can I Do" (Inst.)		Kim Seung-Jae; Park Ga-young; Mo Soo-Jin		3:21
Total length:					6:42

=== Part 4 ===
No.	Title	Lyrics	Music	Artist	Length
1.	"The Beginning" (시작)	Han Jun	Lee Yu-jin	A.C.E (Kim Byeong-kwan & Chan)	3:17
2.	"The Beginning" (Inst.)		Lee Yu-jin		3:17
Total length:					6:34

=== Part 5 ===
No.	Title	Lyrics	Music	Artist	Length
1.	"Remember Me"	Kim Ah-reum; Miyao	Jade; Sungjin	D:amant	3:45
2.	"Remember Me" (Inst.)		Jade; Sungjin		3:45
Total length:					7:30

=== Part 6 ===
No.	Title	Lyrics	Music	Artist	Length
1.	"What I Can Do For You" (내가 해줄 수 있는 일)	Hoe Jang-nim; Choi In-hee	Hoe Jang-nim; Choi In-hee; Kim Hyun-suk; Kim Chan-hyuk	Na Yoon-kwon	5:00
2.	"What I Can Do For You" (Inst.)		Hoe Jang-nim; Choi In-hee; Kim Hyun-suk; Kim Chan-hyuk		5:00
Total length:					10:00

=== Part 7 ===
No.	Title	Lyrics	Music	Artist	Length
1.	"Bad Love" (나쁜 사랑)	Jin Kyo-jun	Jin Kyo-jun	Yoon Ye-kyu	3:52
2.	"Bad Love" (Inst.)		Jin Kyo-jun		3:52
Total length:					7:44

=== Part 8 ===
No.	Title	Lyrics	Music	Artist	Length
1.	"Close To You" (한걸음 또 한걸음)	Kang Tae-kyu	Jung Woo-sik; Jung So-ri	Jin Won	3:46
2.	"Close To You" (Inst.)		Jung Woo-sik; Jung So-ri		3:46
Total length:					7:32

=== Part 9 ===
No.	Title	Lyrics	Music	Artist	Length
1.	"So We Are" (그래서 우리는)	Kim Do-hyung; Gya Gya-mel	Kim Do-hyung; Flame Man (불꽃남자)	Do Hyung	4:16
2.	"So We Are" (Inst.)		Kim Do-hyung; Flame Man (불꽃남자)		4:16
Total length:					8:32

=== Part 10 ===
No.	Title	Lyrics	Music	Artist	Length
1.	"Love Is Coming" (그대 오는 날)	Kang Tae-kyu	Jung Woo-sik	Hong Jin-young	3:39
2.	"Love Is Coming" (Inst.)		Jung Woo-sik		3:39
3.	"Love Is Coming (Acoustic Ver.)"	Kang Tae-kyu	Jung Woo-sik	Hong Jin-young	3:41
4.	"Love Is Coming (Acoustic Ver.)" (Inst.)		Jung Woo-sik		3:41
Total length:					14:40

=== Part 11 ===
No.	Title	Lyrics	Music	Artist	Length
1.	"I Want To Hear You" (니가 듣고싶다)	Ppake; Aile; Kang Tae-kyu	Ppake; Aile; Space Rain (우주비); Doo	Hwan & Seo Seok-jin (N.CUS)	4:35
2.	"I Want To Hear You" (Inst.)		Ppake; Aile; Space Rain (우주비); Doo		4:35
Total length:					9:10

=== Part 12 ===
No.	Title	Lyrics	Music	Artist	Length
1.	"Love Always Run Away" (사랑은 늘 도망가)	Kang Tae-kyu	Hong Jin-young; Jung Woo-sik	Kim Yang	4:20
2.	"Love Always Run Away" (Inst.)		Hong Jin-young; Jung Woo-sik		4:20
Total length:					8:40

=== Part 13 ===
No.	Title	Lyrics	Music	Artist	Length
1.	"Destiny"	LoF!; NIA	LoF!; Yeun	NIA	3:38
2.	"Destiny" (Inst.)		LoF!; Yeun		3:32
Total length:					7:00

== Viewership ==
- In this table, the blue numbers represent the lowest ratings and the red numbers represent the highest ratings.
- N/A denotes that the rating is not known.
- Each night's broadcast is divided into two 40-minute episodes with a commercial break in between.

Ep.	Original broadcast date	Average audience share		
Ep.	Original broadcast date	AGB Nielsen		TNmS
Ep.	Original broadcast date	Nationwide	Seoul	Nationwide
1	September 28, 2019	17.1%	15.9%	19.3%
2	September 28, 2019	19.6%	17.8%	22.2%
3	September 29, 2019	20.2%	19.1%	20.9%
4	September 29, 2019	24.1%	23.0%	25.3%
5	October 5, 2019	18.5%	17.2%	19.2%
6	October 5, 2019	20.7%	19.6%	22.0%
7	October 6, 2019	21.7%	20.6%	20.8%
8	October 6, 2019	25.7%	24.2%	24.6%
9	October 12, 2019	19.2%	18.0%	18.0%
10	October 12, 2019	22.2%	21.3%	20.1%
11	October 13, 2019	20.3%	19.1%	19.4%
12	October 13, 2019	24.0%	22.5%	23.0%
13	October 19, 2019	16.9%	15.3%	17.7%
14	October 19, 2019	20.2%	19.1%	20.7%
15	October 20, 2019	20.5%	19.3%	20.4%
16	October 20, 2019	23.6%	22.2%	24.0%
17	October 26, 2019	13.6%	12.7%	—N/a
18	October 26, 2019	13.6%	12.7%	—N/a
19	October 27, 2019	18.8%	17.9%	18.7%
20	October 27, 2019	23.0%	22.0%	22.6%
21	November 2, 2019	17.3%	16.6%	17.7%
22	November 2, 2019	20.3%	20.0%	20.9%
23	November 3, 2019	20.6%	19.7%	19.5%
24	November 3, 2019	23.6%	22.4%	22.6%
25	November 9, 2019	17.2%	16.0%	16.9%
26	November 9, 2019	20.2%	18.6%	19.9%
27	November 10, 2019	20.7%	20.2%	19.5%
28	November 10, 2019	24.0%	22.9%	22.8%
29	November 16, 2019	17.9%	16.0%	17.3%
30	November 16, 2019	20.8%	18.6%	20.4%
31	November 17, 2019	20.9%	19.7%	19.3%
32	November 17, 2019	25.0%	23.5%	23.1%
33	November 23, 2019	19.2%	18.1%	18.3%
34	November 23, 2019	23.2%	21.7%	22.3%
35	November 24, 2019	24.4%	23.2%	22.4%
36	November 24, 2019	28.3%	26.7%	26.1%
37	November 30, 2019	19.6%	18.3%	19.3%
38	November 30, 2019	23.3%	21.7%	23.5%
39	December 1, 2019	23.5%	22.3%	21.1%
40	December 1, 2019	27.8%	26.2%	26.0%
41	December 7, 2019	20.2%	18.2%	—N/a
42	December 7, 2019	24.0%	21.9%	—N/a
43	December 8, 2019	23.6%	22.5%	22.5%
44	December 8, 2019	27.3%	26.2%	25.6%
45	December 14, 2019	19.5%	18.4%	20.1%
46	December 14, 2019	23.2%	22.0%	23.8%
47	December 15, 2019	23.7%	23.5%	22.1%
48	December 15, 2019	27.0%	26.3%	26.4%
49	December 21, 2019	21.9%	21.0%	20.3%
50	December 21, 2019	25.7%	24.3%	24.3%
51	December 22, 2019	24.4%	22.5%	23.6%
52	December 22, 2019	27.7%	26.4%	27.4%
53	January 4, 2020	19.4%	19.5%	18.2%
54	January 4, 2020	23.8%	23.6%	22.8%
55	January 5, 2020	24.7%	23.5%	24.0%
56	January 5, 2020	29.0%	28.2%	28.0%
57	January 11, 2020	18.4%	17.2%	19.9%
58	January 11, 2020	23.1%	21.8%	24.9%
59	January 12, 2020	24.0%	22.8%	23.3%
60	January 12, 2020	26.5%	25.4%	26.9%
61	January 18, 2020	21.9%	21.1%	20.5%
62	January 18, 2020	26.1%	25.1%	24.5%
63	January 19, 2020	23.4%	22.3%	22.4%
64	January 19, 2020	27.8%	26.4%	27.0%
65	January 25, 2020	17.4%	16.8%	15.7%
66	January 25, 2020	21.0%	20.5%	19.1%
67	January 26, 2020	21.8%	20.9%	21.1%
68	January 26, 2020	25.0%	23.7%	25.7%
69	February 1, 2020	20.9%	19.6%	20.5%
70	February 1, 2020	25.0%	23.7%	25.0%
71	February 2, 2020	23.9%	23.1%	23.7%
72	February 2, 2020	28.0%	26.7%	28.0%
73	February 8, 2020	21.3%	19.9%	20.1%
74	February 8, 2020	26.1%	24.4%	25.1%
75	February 9, 2020	25.2%	23.4%	24.9%
76	February 9, 2020	28.8%	26.9%	28.9%
77	February 15, 2020	20.9%	20.1%	19.8%
78	February 15, 2020	25.0%	24.0%	24.0%
79	February 16, 2020	27.5%	27.3%	25.7%
80	February 16, 2020	30.4%	29.9%	29.1%
81	February 22, 2020	22.4%	21.3%	21.0%
82	February 22, 2020	26.9%	26.0%	25.6%
83	February 23, 2020	26.4%	25.1%	26.3%
84	February 23, 2020	30.6%	29.2%	30.3%
85	February 29, 2020	22.6%	22.4%	20.8%
86	February 29, 2020	27.0%	25.9%	25.8%
87	March 1, 2020	27.2%	26.0%	25.6%
88	March 1, 2020	31.5%	30.3%	29.4%
89	March 7, 2020	24.3%	22.7%	22.5%
90	March 7, 2020	29.5%	27.5%	26.3%
91	March 8, 2020	28.8%	27.6%	27.1%
92	March 8, 2020	32.3%	31.0%	31.1%
93	March 14, 2020	15.9%	14.8%	16.3%
94	March 14, 2020	26.3%	24.6%	24.5%
95	March 15, 2020	28.8%	27.9%	28.5%
96	March 15, 2020	31.2%	30.3%	30.6%
97	March 21, 2020	25.4%	24.9%	24.5%
98	March 21, 2020	29.6%	29.3%	28.0%
99	March 22, 2020	29.2%	28.8%	27.8%
100	March 22, 2020	32.0%	31.5%	31.5%
Average		23.5%	22.4%	— (Note: Due to some ratings not recorded, the exact average rating is unknown.)

== Awards and nominations ==
Year	Award	Category	Recipient	Result	Ref.
2019	KBS Drama Awards	Excellence Award, Actor in a Serial Drama	Oh Min-suk	Won	
2019	KBS Drama Awards	Excellence Award, Actor in a Serial Drama	Yoon Park	Nominated	
2019	KBS Drama Awards	Excellence Award, Actress in a Serial Drama	Seol In-ah	Won	
2019	KBS Drama Awards	Excellence Award, Actress in a Serial Drama	Jo Yoon-hee	Nominated	
2019	KBS Drama Awards	Excellence Award, Actress in a Serial Drama	Kim Mi-sook	Nominated	
2019	KBS Drama Awards	Best New Actor	Kim Jae-young	Won	
2019	KBS Drama Awards	Best New Actress	Jo Woo-ri	Nominated	
2019	KBS Drama Awards	Best Couple	Kim Jae-young & Seol In-ah	Nominated	
2019	KBS Drama Awards	Best Couple	Jo Yoon-hee & Yoon Park	Nominated	
2019	KBS Drama Awards	Netizen Award	Kim Jae-young	Nominated	
2019	KBS Drama Awards	Netizen Award	Seol In-ah	Nominated	
2019	KBS Drama Awards	Netizen Award	Jo Yoon-hee	Nominated	
