= Song Geon-hee =

South Korean actor

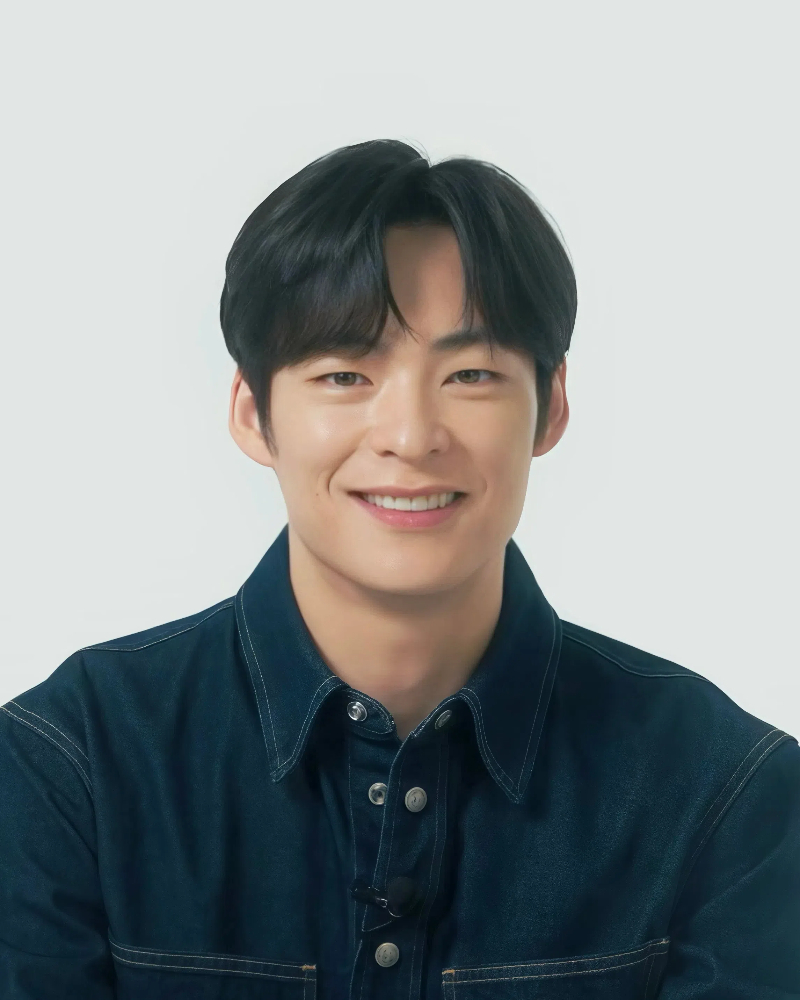
- Song in May 2024
- Born: August 16, 1997 (age 29); Gunpo, Gyeonggi Province, South Korea
- Education: Sejong University
- Occupation: Actor
- Years active: 2016–present
- Agent: JG Entertainment

Korean name
- Hangul: 송건희
- RR: Song Geonhui
- MR: Song Kŏnhŭi

Song Geon-hee (Korean: 송건희; born August 16, 1997) is a South Korean actor. He is best known for his role in the hit television series Sky Castle (2018–19) and the 2024 television series Lovely Runner.

== Filmography ==
=== Film ===
Year	Title	Role	Notes	Ref.
2022	A Christmas Carol	Moon Ja-hun		

=== Television series ===
Year	Title	Role	Notes	Ref.
2018	Gangnam Beauty			
2018–2019	Sky Castle	Park Young-jae		
2019	At Eighteen	Shin Jung-hoo	Cameo (Episode 3–4)	
2019	Arthdal Chronicles	Black Tongue		
2019	Birthday Letter	Kim Moo-gil		
2019	The Tale of Nokdu	Jeon Hwang-tae		
2019	King of Mask Singer	Contestant	Gargamel (Episode 197)	
2020	Mystic Pop-up Bar	Crown Prince		
2020	Missing: The Other Side	Thomas		
2020–2021	Snowdrop	Eun Young-woo		
2023	Joseon Attorney	Lee Hyul		
2024	Lovely Runner	Kim Tae-sung		
2024	Family by Choice	Dal’s blind date	Cameo (Ep.16)	
2025	Karma	Kim Beom-jun	Cameo (Ep.6)	
2026	The Scarecrow	Lee Ki-beom / Cha Young-bum		
2026	Our Sticky Love	Baek Sang-gil (youth)	Cameo (Ep.9-12)	

=== Web series ===
Year	Title	Role	Notes	Ref.
2017	Flat	Yeon Woo		
2017	Hello Stranger	Lee Ri-on		
2018	Not Alright, But It's Alright	Kwon Ki-woo		
2019	Love Alarm	Marx	Netflix series	
2022	Alice: She's the Last Weapon	Yeo-reum		

== Theater ==
Year	English title	Korean title	Role	Ref.
2022	Midnight Sun	태양의 노래	Jung Ha-ram	

== Awards and nominations ==
Name of the award ceremony, year presented, category, nominee of the award, and the result of the nomination
Award ceremony	Year	Category	Nominee / Work	Result	Ref.
Baeksang Arts Awards	2025	Best New Actor – Television	Lovely Runner	Nominated	
Blue Dragon Series Awards	2026	Best New Actor	The Scarecrow	Nominated	
Brand of the Year Awards	2024	Actor – Rising Star	Lovely Runner	Won	
