= Birthday Letter =

- Genre: Period drama War; Action; Thriller; Romance
- Written by: Bae Soo-young
- Screenplay by: Bae Soo-young
- Directed by: Kim Jung-kyoo
- Starring: Song Geon-hee; Jo Soo-min; Jeon Moo-song; Jung Young-sook
- Country of origin: South Korea
- Original language: Korean
- No. of seasons: 1
- No. of episodes: 4

Production
- Executive producer: Ham Young-hoon
- Running time: 32 minutes
- Production company: Ace Factory

Original release
- Network: KBS2
- Release: September 11 – September 12, 2019

Birthday Letter (Korean: 생일편지; RR: Saengilpyeonji) is a 2019 South Korean television series starring Song Geon-hee and Jo Soo-min, along with Jeon Moo-song and Jung Young-sook. It aired on KBS2 from 11–12 September 2019 on Wednesday at 22:00 until 23:10, and Thursday at 21:55 until 23:10 for 4 episodes.

== Plot ==
This series is set during the Korean Independence War in 1945, and celebrates the Chuseok Party.

During the Japanese colonial rule era, Kim Moo-gil (Song Geon-hee) and Yeo Il-ae (Jo Soo-min) are childhood friends who are each other's first love. Against their will, they both have to leave Hapcheon, South Korea and go to Hiroshima, Japan for conscription. There they are separated from each other and suffer an atomic bombing. Later, in 2019, they finally return home alive, and Moo-gil, now Jeon Moo-song, receives a birthday letter from his first love Il-ae, now Jung Young-sook.

== Cast ==
=== People in the year 1945 (past) ===
- Song Geon-hee as Kim Moo-gil
- Jo Soo-min as Yeo Il-ae, Moo-gil's hometown friend and first love.
- Go Geon-han as Jo Ham-duk, Moo-gil's hometown friend.
- Kim Yi-kyung as Jo Young-geum, Ham-duk's little sister who has crush on Moo-gil.
- Kim Hee-jung as Moo-gil and Moo-jin's mother
- Hong Seok-woo as Kim Moo-jin, Moo-gil's big brother.
- Oh Man-seok as Ham-duk and Young-geum's father
- Ham Sung-min as Joo Geun-kkae

=== People in the year 2019 (now) ===
- Jeon Moo-song as old Kim Moo-gil
- Jeon So-min as Kim Jae-yeon, Moo-gil's granddaughter.
- Kim Kyung-nam as Goo Ki-woong, Jae-yeon's lover and college classmate.
- Jung Young-sook as old Yeo Il-ae

== Rating ==
Episode	Original broadcast date	Average audience share	
Episode	Original broadcast date	TNmS	Nielsen
1	September 11, 2019	2.8%	2.8%
2	September 11, 2019	—N/a	2.8%
3	September 12, 2019	1.4%	0.9%
4	September 12, 2019	—N/a	1.4%
Average		%	2.0%
