= A Place in the Sun (South Korean TV series) =

2019 South Korean television series

- Promotional poster
- Also known as: The Sun's Seasons
- Hangul: 태양의 계절
- Hanja: 太陽의 季節
- RR: Taeyangui gyejeol
- MR: T'aeyangŭi kyejŏl
- Genre: Melodrama; Revenge
- Written by: Lee Eun-joo
- Directed by: Kim Won-yong
- Starring: Oh Chang-seok; Yoon So-yi; Choi Sung-jae; Ha Si-eun
- Country of origin: South Korea
- Original language: Korean
- No. of episodes: 102

Production
- Running time: 40 minutes
- Production company: Samhwa Networks

Original release
- Network: KBS2
- Release: June 3 – November 1, 2019

A Place in the Sun (Korean: 태양의 계절) is a 2019 South Korean television series starring Oh Chang-seok, Yoon So-yi, Choi Sung-jae and Ha Si-eun.

The drama received a warning for using a store selling acupressure beds, a product of the program's indirect advertiser, as a primary setting. It disrupted the narrative flow by displaying the product's features through dialogue and showing most of them.

== Plot ==
A man assumes a new identity after a car accident that almost killed him to seek revenge.

== Cast ==
=== Main characters ===
- Choi Sung-jae as Choi Gwang-il
- Ha Si-eun as Chae Deok-sil
- Oh Chang-seok as Oh Tae-yang/Kim Yoo-wol
  - Choi Seung-hoon as young Tae-yang/Yoo-wol
- Yoon So-yi as Yoon Si-wol

=== Supporting ===
- Lee Deok-hee as Jang Jeong-hee, Chairman's eldest daughter, Gwangil's mother and Taeyang's birth mother. CEO of Yangji Fashion.
  - Son Seong-yoon as young Jang Jeong-hee
