= Pearl in Red =

2026 South Korean television series

- Promotional poster
- Hangul: 붉은 진주
- Hanja: 붉은 珍珠
- Lit.: Red Pearl
- RR: Bulgeun jinju
- MR: Pulgŭn chinju
- Genre: Revenge drama
- Written by: Kim Seo-jung
- Directed by: Kim Sung-geun
- Starring: Park Jin-hee; Nam Sang-ji; Kim Kyung-bo; Kang Da-bin; Choi Jae-sung; Kim Hee-jung; Cheon Hee-joo
- Country of origin: South Korea
- Original language: Korean
- No. of episodes: 102

Production
- Production companies: DK E&M; Monster Union

Original release
- Network: KBS2
- Release: February 23 – August 7, 2026

Pearl in Red (Korean: 붉은 진주) is a 2026 South Korean television series written by Kim Seo-jung, directed by Kim Sung-geun, and starring Park Jin-hee, Nam Sang-ji, Kim Kyung-bo, Kang Da-bin, Choi Jae-sung, Kim Hee-jung, and Cheon Hee-joo. The series follows the intertwined fates of two women who return under false identities to uncover the truth and sins hidden in the Adele family, in a web of secrets and retribution. It aired on KBS2 from February 23, to August 7, 2026, every Monday to Friday at 19:50 (KST).

== Synopsis ==
Two women driven by tragic losses are targeting Adele Group. It begins with Kim Dan-hee assuming her deceased twin sister's identity, Kim Myeong-hee, and bringing her nephew into the Adele family as her son, aiming to gain control of the Adele Group and seeking revenge on the people who murdered and betrayed her twin sister. Baek Jin-ju, betrayed by a jealous friend and witnessing her father die in a horrible accident, grows into a person seeking punishment against those responsible for her father's death, under the name Chloe Lee. Both women are under disguise, seeking retribution and to uncover the group's dark secrets.

== Cast and characters ==
=== Main ===
- Park Jin-hee as Kim Myeong-hee / Kim Dan-hee
1. Kim Myeong-hee: The older of the twins, who works as a nurse and dreams of having an ordinary family, tragically dies. Left orphaned at a young age, she dedicated her life to protecting her twin sister, Dan-hee. To raise money for Dan-hee's surgery, she gets entangled with Tae-ho, but ultimately finds herself exploited and betrayed while pregnant with his child.
2. Kim Dan-hee: The younger of the twins, who sacrificed her life and lives under her deceased sister's name, plots meticulous revenge to take over the Adele Group after learning the truth behind her sister's death. She raised her deceased sister's son, Park Min-jun, as her own child in the Adele family and is determined to protect him from any danger plotted by Jung-ran. To crush Jung-ran's dreams of power, she strategically positioned her nephew Min-jun as Adele's successor. She herself climbed the corporate ladder, initially working as a jewelry appraiser before ultimately becoming the group's president.
- Nam Sang-ji as Baek Jin-ju / Chloe Lee

After being betrayed by a friend and losing her father in a horrible car crash and explosion, she reinvents herself as a top brand consultant and infiltrates the Adele Group to get revenge. Her life takes a complicated turn as she becomes embroiled with her former lover Min-jun and his half-brother Hyun-jun.

- Kim Kyung-bo as Park Min-jun

Dan-hee's nephew, who is the first director of Adele Group. The shadow of his mother's status as a mistress haunted his childhood. As a grown man, he faced relentless succession struggles and suffered the crushing loss of his first love, Jin-ju. His life is turned upside down by Chloe, a Jin-ju lookalike. As he uncovers her true identity and the Adele family's dark secrets, he transforms into a man determined to protect his love at any cost.

- Kang Da-bin as Park Hyun-jun

Min-jun's half-brother and Jung-ran's son who is the second division head of the Adele Group. Despite his bold and cunning nature, he shows little interest in vying for the succession. Only after losing Jin-ju did he realize she was his first love. Chloe's appearance sparks a growing obsession, clouding his judgment and driving him to make destructive choices.

- Choi Jae-sung as Park Tae-ho

The chairman of the Adele Group. Coming from a poor background, he married into a prominent jewelry family and manipulated his father-in-law's will to divert his wife's family's wealth to himself. He expanded the family business from a jeweler into a large corporation, with the sole goal of making Adele the world's top company. Ruthless and unscrupulous, he uses everyone, including his own family, as pawns to achieve his ambitions. A ruthless master manipulator, he doesn't hesitate to put Dan-hee and Jin-ju in harm's way to protect his own power and luxurious facade.

- Kim Hee-jung as Oh Jung-ran

Tae-ho's wife who is the director of the Adele Gallery. She rises from a floor-cleaning maid to head of a large corporation. Driven by ambition, she orchestrates the poisoning of the landlady and forges her master's will to secure her position.

- Cheon Hee-joo as Choi Yu-na

The head of the Adele Group's new business TF team. She has a complex relationship with Jin-ju, fueled by long-standing feelings of inadequacy. Believing Jin-ju stole her dreams of becoming a jewelry designer and her first love, Min-jun, she ultimately betrays her, claiming Jin-ju's success and life for herself.

=== Supporting ===
==== People around Dan-hee ====
- Ha Jae-sook as Jung Yoon-jung

Dan-hee's close friend and secretary.

- Geum Ho-suk as Jung Woo-jin

Yoon-jung's younger brother.

- Ban Hyo-jung as Madam Han

A renowned hanbok designer and owner of Ihwachae, who secretly supports Dan-hee.

==== People around Jin-ju ====
- Jung Ui-gap as James Lee

Chloe's father and Jin-ju's godfather, he assumes the role of godfather to Jin-ju and uses his deceased daughter's name as a means to seek vengeance on her behalf.

- Nam Seong-jin as Baek Jun-ki

The CEO of Temi Bio, who is Jin-ju's father.

==== Yu-na's family ====
- Cha Kwang-soo as Choi Sam-sik

Yu-na's father.

- Kim Kyung-sook as Hong Young-sil

Yu-na's mother.

==== Others ====
- Lee Myung-ho as Song Geun-tae

Jung-ran's chauffeur.

- Kim Bo-mi as Ok Hye-kyung (Butler Ok)

Tae-ho's housekeeper.

- Ban Sang-yoon as Kang Myeong-seok (Manager Kang)

Tae-ho's secretary.

== Production ==
=== Development ===
Pearl in Red is directed by Kim Sung-geun, who helmed Unpredictable Family (2023–2024) and My Merry Marriage (2024–2025), and the screenplay is written by Kim Seo-jung, while DK E&M and Monster Union jointly managed the production.

Director Kim described the series as focusing on character relationships and solidarity, following a healing journey where two women, previously masked by revenge, find self-discovery and learn to embrace their true selves. It conveys themes of self-forgiveness and love. Writer Kim S.J. added that the story explores the irony of finding truth through lies, aiming to challenge the notion that lies are inherently evil and truth is good. Instead, the work questions how human choices determine morality, conveying a profound message on the nature of truth and deception.

=== Casting ===
In November 2025, Park Jin-hee was cast as the lead, and the script reading was already in preparation.

Nam Sang-ji and Park J.H. were officially confirmed to lead the series on January 5, 2026. Both play characters who are involved in intense revenge under false identities after losing something precious. Two days later, Choi Jae-sung, Kim Hee-jung, Kim Kyung-bo, Kang Da-bin, and Cheon Hee-joo were confirmed their casting. It also reveals that Nam Sang-ji's character's real name is Baek Jin-ju. Lee Myung-ho, Kim Bo-mi, Cha Kwang-soo, Kim Kyung-sook, Jung Ui-gap, Ha Jae-sook, and Geum Ho-suk were revealed to have joined the cast by January 14, 2026.

== Release ==
On December 31, 2025, KBS officially unveiled Pearl in Red as part of its 2026 drama lineup. By January 2026, the series was confirmed to premiere on KBS2 on February 23, 2026, airing every Monday to Friday at 19:50 (KST).

== Viewership ==
Pearl in Red : South Korea viewers per episode (millions)

Episodes	Episode number																								
Episodes	1	2	3	4	5	6	7	8	9	10	11	12	13	14	15	16	17	18	19	20	21	22	23	24	25
1–25	1.594	1.626	1.528	1.648	1.708	1.698	1.688	1.555	1.452	1.414	1.355	1.226	1.505	1.369	1.493	1.363	1.377	1.341	1.455	1.411	1.295	1.386	1.471	1.494	1.373
26–50	1.310	1.398	1.377	1.289	1.351	1.310	1.411	1.337	1.260	1.351	1.447	1.277	1.378	1.405	1.482	1.288	1.342	1.165	1.381	1.329	1.298	1.300	1.321	1.284	1.347
51–75	1.299	1.302	1.266	1.304	1.427	1.444	1.365	1.281	1.320	1.357	1.079	1.285	1.293	1.369	1.219	1.404	1.271	1.318	1.328	1.343	1.296	1.354	1.370	1.267	1.411
76–100	1.339	1.250	1.361	1.287	1.417	1.414	1.424	1.358	1.533	1.271	1.490	1.480	1.491	1.474	1.420	1.339	1.417	1.401	1.456	1.412	1.524	1.437	1.427	1.465	1.371
101–102	1.394	1.477	–																						

Source: Audience measurement performed nationwide by Nielsen Korea.

Average TV viewership ratings
Ep.	Original broadcast date	Average audience share	
Ep.	Original broadcast date	Nielsen Korea	
Ep.	Original broadcast date	Nationwide	Seoul
1	February 23, 2026	8.7% (2nd)	7.2% (4th)
2	February 24, 2026	8.8% (2nd)	7.2% (2nd)
3	February 25, 2026	8.5% (2nd)	6.9% (3rd)
4	February 26, 2026	8.9% (2nd)	7.8% (3rd)
5	February 27, 2026	9.1% (2nd)	7.4% (3rd)
6	March 2, 2026	9.2% (3rd)	7.9% (4th)
7	March 3, 2026	9.4% (2nd)	7.5% (4th)
8	March 4, 2026	9.0% (2nd)	7.4% (4th)
9	March 10, 2026	7.9% (4th)	6.2% (4th)
10	March 11, 2026	7.7% (4th)	6.4% (4th)
11	March 12, 2026	7.4% (3rd)	6.0% (3rd)
12	March 13, 2026	6.7% (5th)	5.2% (7th)
13	March 16, 2026	8.0% (3rd)	6.4% (4th)
14	March 17, 2026	7.2% (3rd)	5.5% (5th)
15	March 18, 2026	8.2% (2nd)	6.3% (3rd)
16	March 19, 2026	7.4% (3rd)	5.7% (5th)
17	March 20, 2026	7.3% (5th)	5.4% (6th)
18	March 23, 2026	7.3% (4th)	5.8% (5th)
19	March 24, 2026	8.0% (2nd)	6.2% (4th)
20	March 25, 2026	7.7% (2nd)	5.8% (5th)
21	March 26, 2026	7.3% (4th)	5.7% (4th)
22	March 27, 2026	7.6% (3rd)	5.7% (6th)
23	March 30, 2026	7.9% (3rd)	6.2% (4th)
24	March 31, 2026	7.9% (2nd)	6.1% (3rd)
25	April 1, 2026	7.6% (2nd)	5.7% (5th)
26	April 2, 2026	7.1% (3rd)	5.8% (4th)
27	April 6, 2026	7.6% (3rd)	6.1% (4th)
28	April 7, 2026	7.5% (3rd)	6.1% (3rd)
29	April 8, 2026	7.0% (3rd)	5.3% (5th)
30	April 9, 2026	7.4% (3rd)	5.7% (4th)
31	April 13, 2026	7.1% (4th)	5.7% (5th)
32	April 14, 2026	7.6% (3rd)	6.0% (4th)
33	April 15, 2026	7.2% (4th)	5.6% (5th)
34	April 16, 2026	6.7% (3rd)	5.5% (3rd)
35	April 20, 2026	7.5% (3rd)	5.9% (4th)
36	April 21, 2026	7.5% (3rd)	6.4% (3rd)
37	April 22, 2026	7.2% (3rd)	5.8% (4th)
38	April 23, 2026	7.3% (2nd)	5.7% (4th)
39	April 27, 2026	7.7% (3rd)	6.2% (4th)
40	April 28, 2026	8.0% (2nd)	6.6% (2nd)
41	April 29, 2026	7.1% (2nd)	5.5% (4th)
42	April 30, 2026	7.1% (2nd)	5.3% (3rd)
43	May 4, 2026	6.6% (4th)	5.6% (5th)
44	May 5, 2026	7.4% (3rd)	5.9% (4th)
45	May 6, 2026	7.3% (3rd)	5.8% (4th)
46	May 7, 2026	7.2% (2nd)	5.8% (2nd)
47	May 11, 2026	7.1% (4th)	6.1% (5th)
48	May 12, 2026	7.1% (3rd)	5.8% (2nd)
49	May 13, 2026	6.7% (4th)	5.3% (4th)
50	May 14, 2026	7.3% (2nd)	6.1% (2nd)
51	May 18, 2026	7.1% (3rd)	5.8% (3rd)
52	May 19, 2026	7.0% (2nd)	5.5% (3rd)
53	May 20, 2026	7.0% (1st)	5.9% (2nd)
54	May 21, 2026	7.0% (3rd)	5.5% (3rd)
55	May 25, 2026	7.3% (3rd)	6.1% (3rd)
56	May 26, 2026	7.7% (2nd)	6.3% (2nd)
57	May 27, 2026	7.1% (2nd)	5.5% (3rd)
58	May 28, 2026	6.8% (3rd)	6.0% (2nd)
59	June 1, 2026	7.2% (3rd)	5.4% (4th)
60	June 2, 2026	7.9% (2nd)	6.2% (2nd)
61	June 3, 2026	6.1% (4th)	5.0% (6th)
62	June 4, 2026	7.3% (3rd)	5.7% (3rd)
63	June 8, 2026	7.2% (3rd)	6.0% (3rd)
64	June 9, 2026	7.3% (2nd)	6.0% (2nd)
65	June 10, 2026	6.5% (4th)	5.7% (3rd)
66	June 11, 2026	7.5% (2nd)	6.4% (2nd)
67	June 15, 2026	7.3% (3rd)	6.7% (2nd)
68	June 16, 2026	7.2% (3rd)	5.9% (3rd)
69	June 17, 2026	7.2% (3rd)	5.8% (3rd)
70	June 18, 2026	7.2% (3rd)	6.0% (3rd)
71	June 22, 2026	7.2% (3rd)	5.7% (3rd)
72	June 23, 2026	7.3% (2nd)	5.9% (2nd)
73	June 24, 2026	7.2% (2nd)	5.9% (3rd)
74	June 29, 2026	7.0% (4th)	5.7% (3rd)
75	June 30, 2026	7.7% (2nd)	6.3% (2nd)
76	July 1, 2026	7.6% (2nd)	6.0% (2nd)
77	July 2, 2026	6.8% (2nd)	5.7% (2nd)
78	July 6, 2026	7.3% (4th)	5.7% (4th)
79	July 7, 2026	7.2% (4th)	5.6% (4th)
80	July 8, 2026	7.8% (3rd)	6.1% (4th)
81	July 9, 2026	7.8% (2nd)	6.7% (2nd)
82	July 10, 2026	7.7% (4th)	6.5% (4th)
83	July 13, 2026	7.4% (4th)	6.3% (3rd)
84	July 14, 2026	8.2% (3rd)	7.3% (2nd)
85	July 15, 2026	7.0% (4th)	6.0% (4th)
86	July 16, 2026	7.8% (2nd)	6.6% (2nd)
87	July 17, 2026	7.5% (4th)	6.2% (4th)
88	July 20, 2026	8.1% (3rd)	6.9% (2nd)
89	July 21, 2026	8.1% (2nd)	6.8% (2nd)
90	July 22, 2026	8.1% (2nd)	6.5% (2nd)
91	July 23, 2026	7.4% (3rd)	6.1% (3rd)
92	July 24, 2026	7.6% (3rd)	6.3% (3rd)
93	July 27, 2026	7.7% (3rd)	6.6% (2nd)
94	July 28, 2026	8.2% (2nd)	6.6% (2nd)
95	July 29, 2026	7.5% (2nd)	5.9% (3rd)
96	July 30, 2026	8.0% (2nd)	6.7% (2nd)
97	July 31, 2026	7.9% (2nd)	7.0% (2nd)
98	August 3, 2026	7.4% (3rd)	6.1% (3rd)
99	August 4, 2026	7.7% (2nd)	6.5% (2nd)
100	August 5, 2026	7.4% (4th)	6.2% (4th)
101	August 6, 2026	7.5% (3rd)	6.3% (3rd)
102	August 7, 2026	7.4% (5th)	6.1% (6th)
Average		7.5%	6.1%
In the table above, the blue numbers represent the lowest ratings and the red numbers represent the highest ratings.
