= 2022 KBS Drama Awards =

36th edition of award ceremony

- Official logo
- Date: December 31, 2022
- Site: KBS Hall, Yeouido, Seoul
- Hosted by: Jun Hyun-moo; Lee Hye-ri; Jung Yong-hwa
- Official website: KBS Drama Awards

Highlights
- Grand Prize (Daesang): Joo Sang-wook; Lee Seung-gi

Television coverage
- Network: KBS2, KBS World
- Duration: Approx. 240 minutes
- Viewership: Ratings: 5.9%; Viewership: 1.161 million

The 2022 KBS Drama Awards, presented by Korean Broadcasting System (KBS), was held on December 31, 2022, from 21:20 (KST) at KBS Hall in Yeouido, Seoul. It was hosted by Jun Hyun-moo, Lee Hye-ri and Jung Yong-hwa.

Joo Sang-wook and Lee Seung-gi won the grand prize (Daesang) for their performances in The King of Tears, Lee Bang-won and The Law Cafe respectively.

== Winners and nominees ==
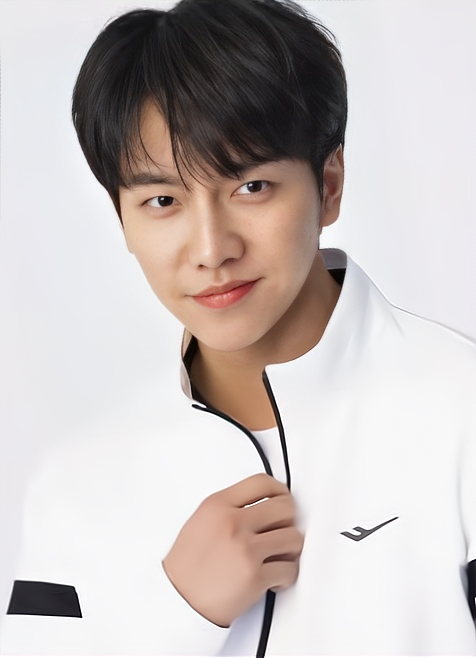
Lee Seung-gi

Winners of Grand Prize (Daesang)
- Winners are listed first and denoted in **bold**

Grand Prize (Daesang)
**Joo Sang-wook – The King of Tears, Lee Bang-won**; **Lee Seung-gi – The Law Cafe**
Top Excellence Award, Actor	Top Excellence Award, Actress
**Kang Ha-neul – Curtain Call**; **Doh Kyung-soo – Bad Prosecutor**; Joo Sang-wook – The King of Tears, Lee Bang-won; Lee Seung-gi – The Law Cafe; Yoon Shi-yoon – It's Beautiful Now; Seo In-guk – Café Minamdang	**Ha Ji-won – Curtain Call**; **Park Jin-hee – The King of Tears, Lee Bang-won**; Kang Han-na – Bloody Heart; Lee Se-young – The Law Cafe; Park Ha-na – Vengeance of the Bride; Park Ji-young – It's Beautiful Now
Excellence Award, Actor in a Miniseries	Excellence Award, Actress in a Miniseries
**Lee Joon – Bloody Heart**; Kang Ha-neul – Curtain Call; Doh Kyung-soo – Bad Prosecutor; Lee Seung-gi – The Law Cafe; Na In-woo – Jinxed at First; Seo In-guk – Café Minamdang	**Kang Han-na – Bloody Heart**; **Lee Hye-ri – Moonshine**; Ha Ji-won – Curtain Call; Lee Se-young – The Law Cafe; Krystal Jung – Crazy Love; Lee Se-hee – Bad Prosecutor; Oh Yeon-seo – Café Minamdang
Excellence Award, Actor in a Serial Drama	Excellence Award, Actress in a Serial Drama
**Yoon Shi-yoon – It's Beautiful Now**; **Lim Ju-hwan – Three Bold Siblings**; Joo Sang-wook – The King of Tears, Lee Bang-won; Kim Young-chul – The King of Tears, Lee Bang-won; Park In-hwan – It's Beautiful Now; Kim Seung-soo – Three Bold Siblings	**Lee Ha-na – Three Bold Siblings**; **Park Ji-young – It's Beautiful Now**; Park Jin-hee – The King of Tears, Lee Bang-won; Ye Ji-won – The King of Tears, Lee Bang-won; Kim So-eun – Three Bold Siblings
Excellence Award, Actor in a Daily Drama	Excellence Award, Actress in a Daily Drama
**Yang Byung-yeol – Bravo, My Life**; **Baek Sung-hyun – The Love in Your Eyes**; Lee Hyun-jin (actor) – Gold Mask; Kang Ji-sub and Son Chang-min – Vengeance of the Bride; Kim Jin-yeop (born 1988) – Love Twist	**Park Ha-na – Vengeance of the Bride**; **Cha Ye-ryun – Gold Mask**; Cha Min-ji – Bravo, My Life; Hahm Eun-jung – Love Twist; Nam Sang-ji – Bravo, My Life; Bae Noo-ri – The Love in Your Eyes
Best Actor in Drama Special/TV Cinema	Best Actress in Drama Special/TV Cinema
**Cha Hak-yeon – "The Stains"**; Kim Ki-hae – "Currently Offline"; Park Sung-hoon – "The Distributors"; Joo Jong-hyuk – "In My Ashtanga Class"; Kang Seung-yoon – "The Season of Undies"; Kim Gun-woo – "The Stranger"; Kim Min-cheol – "Prism"	**Shin Eun-soo – "Like Otters"**; Park Ha-na – "Devil in the Lake"; Kim So-eun – "The Distributors"; Byun Seo-yoon – "The Stain"; Han Ji-eun – "The Stranger"; Bae Yoon-kyung – "In My Ashtanga Class"; Kim Sae-byuk – "Silence of the Lambs"
Best Supporting Actor	Best Supporting Actress
**Sung Dong-il – Curtain Call, If You Wish Upon Me**; **Heo Sung-tae – Bloody Heart**; Jo Han-chul – Love All Play; Kwak Si-yang – Café Minamdang; Oh Min-suk – It's Beautiful Now; Song Seung-hwan – Three Bold Siblings	**Ye Ji-won – The King of Tears, Lee Bang-won**; **Park Ji-yeon (actress) – Bloody Heart**; Ji Soo-won – Vengeance of the Bride; Kim Seul-gi – The Law Cafe; Shin Dong-mi – It's Beautiful Now; Won Ji-an – If You Wish Upon Me
Best New Actor	Best New Actress
**Byeon Woo-seok - Moonshine**; **Lee You-jin - Three Bold Siblings**; **Chae Jong-hyeop - Love All Play**; Kim Min-gi – The King of Tears, Lee Bang-won; Noh Sang-hyun – Curtain Call; Yang Byung-yeol – Bravo, My Life; Seo Bum-june – It's Beautiful Now	**Kang Mi-na - Moonshine**, Café Minamdang; **Seohyun - Jinxed at First**; **Jung Ji-so - Curtain Call**; Park Ju-hyun - Love All Play; Nam Sang-ji – Bravo, My Life; Choi Ri – Bloody Heart; Bae Da-bin – It's Beautiful Now
Best Young Actor	Best Young Actress
**Jung Min-joon – Gold Mask**; Jung Hyeon-jun – Bad Prosecutor; Kim Joon-ui – The King of Tears, Lee Bang-won; Kim Si-woo (male) – Bravo, My Life; Kim So-min (born 2014) – It's Beautiful Now; Park Sang-hoon – The Law Cafe	**Yoon Chae-na – Love Twist, The Love in Your Eyes**; Ahn Se-bin – The Law Cafe; Ki So-yu – Three Bold Siblings; Kim Ha-yeon – Bravo, My Life; Kim Hyo-kyung – It's Beautiful Now; Lee A-ra – Vengeance of the Bride
Popularity Award, Actor	Popularity Award, Actress
**Doh Kyung-soo – Bad Prosecutor**; **Kang Ha-neul – Curtain Call**	**Krystal Jung – Crazy Love**; **Lee Se-hee – Bad Prosecutor**
Best Couple Award
**Doh Kyung-soo and Lee Se-hee – Bad Prosecutor**; **Kang Ha-neul and Ha Ji-won – Curtain Call**; **Kim Seung-soo and Kim So-eun – Three Bold Siblings**; **Lee Joon and Kang Han-na – Bloody Heart**; **Lee Seung-gi and Lee Se-young – The Law Cafe**; **Na In-woo and Seohyun – Jinxed at First**; **Yoon Shi-yoon and Bae Da-bin – It's Beautiful Now**; **Seo In-guk and Oh Yeon-seo – Café Minamdang**

== Presenters ==
Order of the presentation, name of the presenter(s), and award(s) they presented
Order	Presenter	Award
1	Choi Myung-bin and Seo Woo-jin	Best Young Actor/Actress
2	Na In-woo and Lee Se-hee	Best New Actor/Actress
3	Keum Sae-rok and Choi Dae-chul	Best Supporting Actor/Actress
4	Jeon So-min and Park Sung-hoon	Best Actor/Actress in Drama Special/TV Cinema
5	Ryu Jin and So Yi-hyun	Excellence Award in Daily Drama
6	Jinyoung and Kim So-hye	Popularity Award
7	Jun Hyun-moo, Lee Hye-ri and Jung Yong-hwa	Best Couple
8	Park Ha-na	Excellence Award, in a Serial Drama
9	Go Min-si and Lee Sang-yeob	Excellence Award, in a Miniseries
10	Park Eun-bin and Cha Tae-hyun	Top Excellence Award
11	Ji Hyun-woo and Kim Ui-chul	Grand Prize (Daesang)

== Special performances ==
Order of the presentation, name of the artist, and the song(s) they performed
Order	Artist	Performed
1	Jinjo Crew	"Circle of Life" (배우, 인생을 연기하다) (original song: "Merry-Go-Round of Life" (인생의 회전목마) by: Jo Hisaishi)
2	Forestella	"Warriors" (original song by: Imagine Dragons)
2	Forestella	"Song of the Wind" (바람의 노래) (original song by: Cho Yong-pil)

== See also ==
- 2022 SBS Drama Awards
- 2022 MBC Drama Awards
