= Lee Hyo-na =

South Korean actress

- Born: South Korea
- Occupation: Actress
- Years active: 2018–present
- Agent: Mask Studio

Korean name
- Hangul: 이효나
- RR: I Hyona
- MR: I Hyona
- Website: maskstudio.kr

Lee Hyo-na (Korean: 이효나) is a South Korean actress under Mask Studio. She made her acting debut in the 2018 KBS1 drama When Time Stopped.

== Filmography ==
=== Television series ===
Year	Title	Role	Notes	Ref.
2018	When Time Stopped	Eun-sook	Acting debut	
2019	I Have Three Boyfriends	Ahn Hyeon-jeong		
2020	Fatal Promise	Choi Joon Kyeong		
2022	Gold Mask	Chae Seung-hee		
2022	Bad Prosecutor	Park Ye-young		
2023	Unpredictable Family	Shin Ha-young		
2024	Parasyte: The Grey			
2025-2026	A Graceful Liar	Joo Young-chae		

== Awards and nominations ==
Name of the award ceremony, year presented, category, nominee of the award, and the result of the nomination
Award ceremony	Year	Category	Nominee / Work	Result	Ref.
KBS Drama Awards	2025	Best New Actress	A Graceful Liar	Nominated	
