= Jung Min-joon =

South Korean child actor (born 2016)

- Born: January 4, 2016 (age 10); South Korea
- Occupation: Actor
- Years active: 2017–present

Korean name
- Hangul: 정민준
- RR: Jeong Minjun
- MR: Chŏng Minjun

Jung Min-joon (born January 4, 2016) is a South Korean child actor.

== Filmography ==
=== Film ===
Year	Title	Role	Ref.
2020	Three Sisters	young Jin-seop	
2022	20th Century Girl	young Joseph / Poong Jun-ho	
2025	The Match	Cho Hun-hyun's son	

=== Television series ===
Year	Title	Role	Ref.
2017	The Rebel		
2019	Beautiful World		
2019	Doctor Detective		
2020	Hyena		
2020	Hi Bye, Mama!		
2021	Mouse		
2021	Mine		
2021	The Second Husband	Moon Sae-byeok / Moon Tae-yang	
2021	Lovers of the Red Sky	Ha Joong	
2022	Gold Mask	Hong Seo-joon	
2022	One Dollar Lawyer	Sa-joon	
2023–2024	Unpredictable Family	Shin Ga-ram	

== Awards and nominations ==
Award ceremony	Year	Category	Nominee / Work	Result	Ref.
KBS Drama Awards	2022	Best Young Actor	Gold Mask	Won	
