= Kim Hee-jung (actress, born 1970) =

South Korean actress (born 1970)

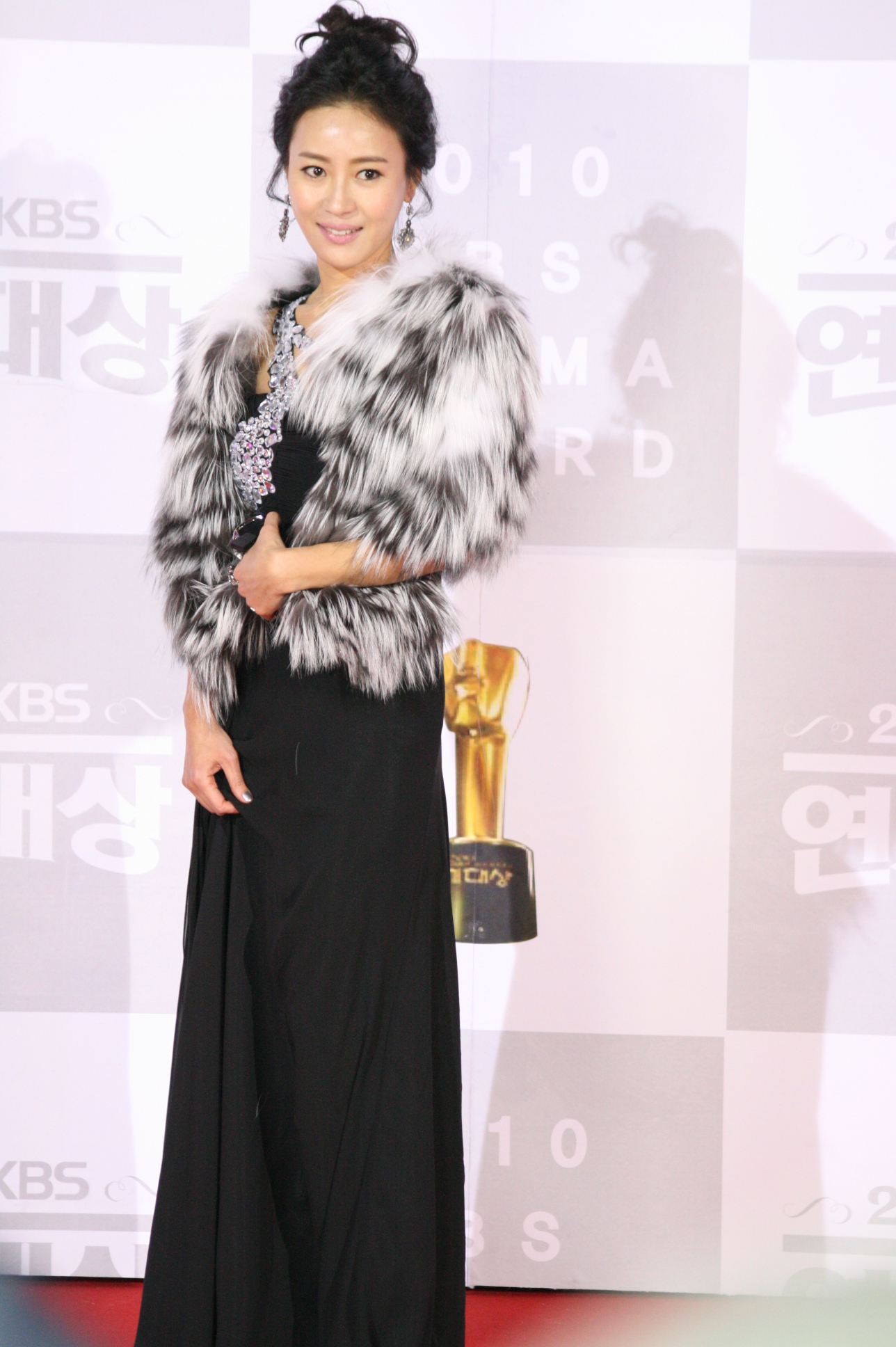
- Kim in December 2010
- Born: December 4, 1970 (age 55); Seoul, South Korea
- Education: ChungAng University - Theater and Film
- Occupation: Actress
- Years active: 1991–present
- Agent: Inyeon Entertainment

Korean name
- Hangul: 김희정
- Hanja: 金姬貞
- RR: Gim Huijeong
- MR: Kim Hŭijŏng

Kim Hee-jung (Korean: 김희정; born December 4, 1970) is a South Korean actress. She made her acting debut after auditioning at SBS's open call for actors in 1991. Kim is best known for her roles in the Korean dramas First Wives' Club (2007–2008), Hilarious Housewives (2009), Three Brothers (2009–2010), and Living in Style (2011-2012).

== Filmography ==
=== Television series ===
| Year | Title | Role |
|---|---|---|
| 1998 | Mister Q | |
| 1999 | Tomato | |
| 1999 | The Clinic for Married Couples: Love and War | |
| 2001–2002 | Ladies of the Palace | young Dal-rae |
| 2002–2003 | Rustic Period | Sayako |
| 2003 | All In | Soo-yeon's office colleague |
| 2003–2004 | The King's Woman | |
| 2004 | Into the Storm | |
| 2004 | Jang Gil-san | Gil-san's sister |
| 2004–2005 | Toji, the Land | Young-sun's mother |
| 2005 | Sad Love Story | Choi Joon-il's girlfriend |
| 2005 | Wonderful Life | Hyung-wook's mother |
| 2005–2006 | Marrying a Millionaire | Jang Soo-ok |
| 2006 | Famous Princesses | Bae Shin-ja |
| 2006–2007 | Queen of the Game | Park Young-soon |
| 2007 | Salt Doll | So-young's friend |
| 2007 | War of Money | Ma Dong-po's wife |
| 2007–2008 | First Wives' Club | Mo Ji-ran |
| 2009 | Hilarious Housewives | Kim Hee-jung |
| 2009–2010 | Three Brothers | Do Woo-mi |
| 2010–2011 | Flames of Desire | Yoon Jung-sook |
| 2011 | Warrior Baek Dong-soo | Lady Park |
| 2011–2012 | Living in Style | Na No-ra |
| 2012–2013 | Glass Mask | Kim Young-hee |
| 2013 | We Are Aliens | Mother |
| 2013 | A Hundred Year Legacy | Gong Kang-sook |
| 2013 | Gu Family Book | Lady Yoon |
| 2013 | Princess Aurora | Eun-ah (cameo) |
| 2013 | Master's Sun | Kang Gil-ja (guest - ep 8) |
| 2013–2014 | Wang's Family | Oh Soon-jung |
| 2013 | The Suspicious Housekeeper | Woo Sun-young (cameo) |
| 2013 | Drama Festival: "Principal Investigator: Save Wang Jo-hyun!" | Joong-sik's mother |
| 2014 | You're All Surrounded | Kim Hwa-young (guest - ep 1, 4) |
| 2014 | Steal Heart | Madam Hong |
| 2014 | KBS Drama Special: "We All Cry Differently" | Kim Kyung-hee |
| 2014 | 4 Legendary Witches | Secret Asset, Top Safety CEO |
| 2015 | Kill Me, Heal Me | Ji Soon-young |
| 2015 | Beating Again | Kang Min-ho's mother (guest) |
| 2015 | Warm and Cozy | Kim Hae-Shil |
| 2015 | KBS Drama Special: "Finding Argenta" | Kang Jin-ah |
| 2015 | My Daughter, Geum Sa-wol | Choi Ma-ri |
| 2015 | Six Flying Dragons | Madam Kang |
| 2016 | Mystery Freshman | Eun-sook |
| 2016 | Secret Healer | Ms. Kim |
| 2016 | Blow Breeze | Lee Nam-yi |
| 2017 | Strong Family | Maeng Mi-ae |
| 2017 | Sweet Enemy | Ma Yoo-kyung |
| 2017 | School 2017 | Kim Sa-boon |
| 2017 | Judge vs. Judge | Eom Sin-sook |
| 2018 | Sketch | Shi-hyun's mother |
| 2018 | The Time | Yang Hee-seok |
| 2018 | The Beauty Inside | Han Seok-hee |
| 2018 | A Pledge to God | Ahn Joo-ryun |
| 2019 | The Secret Life of My Secretary | Jeong Gal Hee's Mother |
| 2019 | Birthday Letter | Moo-gil and Moo-jin's mother |
| 2020 | Mystic Pop-up Bar | Wol-joo's mother (cameo) |
| 2020 | More Than Friends | Choi Won-jung |
| 2020 | Tale of the Nine Tailed | Nam Ji-ah's mother (cameo) |
| 2020 | Start-Up | Nam Do-san's mother |
| 2021–2022 | The Second Husband | Bok Bok-soon |
| 2022 | Bravo, My Life | Seo Myeong-sook |
| 2022 | Again My Life | Lee Mi-ok |
| 2022 | On Your Own Street, We Are | Seung-mo's mother |
| 2023 | Woman in a Veil | Seo Jeong-hye |
| 2023 | Longing for You | Pi Jang-mi |
| 2025 | Our Golden Days | Kim Da-jung |
| 2026 | Pearl in Red | Oh Jung-ran |

=== Web series ===
| Year | Title | Role |
|---|---|---|
| 2015 | Exo Next Door | Ji Yeon-hee's mother |
| 2021 | Sweet Home | Cha Jin-ok |
| 2021 | So Not Worth It | Se-wan's mother Cameo (Ep. 10) |
| 2022 | Kiss Sixth Sense | Kim Sa-ra |
| 2025 | Heo's Diner | Eun-sil's mother |

=== Film ===
| Year | Title | Role |
|---|---|---|
| 1990 | The Spirit of the Dragon | Ah-Mil |
| 2001 | Kiss Me Much | Woman selling her kidney (cameo) |
| 2002 | Conduct Zero | School nurse |
| 2004 | Mokpo, Gangster's Paradise | |
| 2005 | Something He Didn't Know (short film) | Miss Yoon |
| 2006 | Vampire Cop Ricky | |
| 2006 | For Horowitz | Jeon Gong-Ja's mother |
| 2006 | Monopoly | Female dealer |
| 2010 | Earth Rep Rolling Stars (animated film) | Nero (voice) |
| 2013 | Jit (Act) | Cha Joo-Hee |
| 2015 | Northern Limit Line | Park Dong-Hyuk's mother (cameo) |
| 2017 | Biting Fly | Kang Hae-Sun |
| 2017 | The Preparation | Jung-Ja |
| 2019 | Idol | Red-light district female boss |

== Awards and nominations ==
| Year | Award | Category | Nominated work | Result |
|---|---|---|---|---|
| 2008 | 2nd Korea Drama Awards | Netizen Popularity Award | First Wives' Club | Won |
| 2008 | SBS Drama Awards | Best Supporting Actress in a Serial Drama | First Wives' Club | Won |
| 2010 | KBS Drama Awards | Excellence Award, Actress in a Daily Drama | Three Brothers | Nominated |
| 2018 | MBC Drama Awards | Best Supporting Actress in a Soap Opera | Secrets and Lies | Nominated |
