= Yang Byung-yeol =

South Korean television and film actor

- Born: November 23, 1993 (age 32)
- Other names: Kang Yun-je; Kang Yoon-je; Yang Byeong-yeol
- Education: Hanyang University - Bachelor of Theater and Film
- Occupations: Film actor; theater actor
- Years active: 2015–present
- Agent: Npio Entertainment

Korean name
- Hangul: 양병열
- Hanja: 楊秉烈
- RR: Yang Byeongyeol
- MR: Yang Pyŏngyŏl

Yang Byung-yeol (Korean: 양병열; born 23 November 1993) is a South Korean theatre, film and television actor. He debuted in 2015 in Naver TV's web drama Dream Knight and was active under the stage name 'Kang Yun-je'. He later on began working under his birth name Yang Byung-yeol. He came into prominence in 2021 in MBC TV series The Red Sleeve, and KBS weekend drama Young Lady and Gentleman. He also appeared in 2018 film The Princess and the Matchmaker. In 2022, he appearied as main lead in KBS's daily drama Bravo, My Life.

== Career ==
Yang Byung-yeol is affiliated to artist management company Npio Entertainment.

In 2021, Yang was cast in historical romance TV series The Red Sleeve as Seong Sik, the elder brother of Seong Deok-im (Royal Noble Consort Uibin Seong) portrayed by Lee Se-young. His performance was appreciated and he received favorable reviews from viewers for his charming portrayal of the character. He was also recognised for his portrayal of Bong Joon-oh in KBS weekend drama Young Lady and Gentleman (2021–22). His "unrivaled performance" was appreciated in the 52 episodes series.

On March 5, 2022 Yang appeared in 546th episode of musical show Immortal Songs: Singing the Legend, which was Young Lady and Gentleman special. He along with Kim Yi-kyung sang a duet "Dream" (orig. song by Bae Suzy & Baekhyun).

In 2022, Yang appeared as main lead in KBS1 daily TV series Bravo, My Life, and won Excellence Award for Actor in a Daily Drama in 2022 KBS Drama Awards.

== Filmography ==
=== Films ===
Year	Title	Role	Notes	Ref.
2015	The Long Way Home	Second lieutenant Ahn		
2016	Trick	High school male student 1, son		
2018	The Princess and the Matchmaker	Man about town 3		

=== Television series ===
Year	Title	Role	Notes	Ref.
2015	Dream Knight	Joon	Debut	
2016	You Are a Gift	Lee Yeong-gwang		
2017	Magic School	Lee Seong	Web drama	
2017	Drama Stage: "Chief B and the Love Letter"	Son Jae-hyeon	Season 1	
2018	Devilish Charm	Joo Ja-rang		
2020	More Than Friends	Joon-yeong		
2020–21	Royal Secret Agent	Civil servant Kim		
2021–2022	Young Lady and Gentleman	Bong Joon-oh		
2021	The Red Sleeve	Seong Sik		
2022	Bravo, My Life	Kang Cha-yeol		

== Awards and nominations ==
Name of the award ceremony, year presented, category, nominee of the award, and the result of the nomination
Award ceremony	Year	Category	Nominee / Work	Result	Ref.
Asia Model Awards	2022	Rising Star Award, Actor	Yang Byung-yeol	Won	
KBS Drama Awards	2022	Excellence Award, Actor in a Daily Drama	Bravo, My Life	Won	
KBS Drama Awards	2022	Best New Actor	Bravo, My Life	Nominated	
