= Your House Helper =

2018 South Korean TV series

- Promotional poster
- Hangul: 당신의 하우스헬퍼
- RR: Dangsinui hauseu helpeo
- MR: Tangsinŭi hausŭ help'ŏ
- Genre: Romantic comedy; Slice of life
- Based on: Your House Helper by Seung Jung-yeon
- Written by: Kim Ji-seon
- Directed by: Jeon Woo-seong; Lim Se-joon
- Starring: Ha Seok-jin; Bona; Lee Ji-hoon; Go Won-hee; Jeon Soo-jin; Seo Eun-ah
- Country of origin: South Korea
- Original language: Korean
- No. of episodes: 32 (Note: Repackaged with two 35-minute episodes shown each night from this drama onwards in accordance with MBC and SBS drama serial time-slots.)

Production
- Executive producers: Hwang In-roe; Kim Sung-geun
- Producer: Choi Jun-ho
- Camera setup: Single-camera
- Running time: 35 minutes
- Production companies: Art & Culture (Note: A subsidiary of Creative Leaders Group Eight)

Original release
- Network: KBS2
- Release: July 4 – August 29, 2018

Your House Helper (Korean: 당신의 하우스헬퍼) is a 2018 South Korean television series based on a webcomic of the same title which was first published in 2014 by KTOON and lasted on the said platform for three seasons. The series stars Ha Seok-jin, Bona, Lee Ji-hoon, Go Won-hee, Jeon Soo-jin and Seo Eun-ah. It aired on KBS2's Wednesdays and Thursdays at 22:00 (KST) from July 4 to August 29, 2018.

== Synopsis ==
A man who works as a house helper helps arrange people's homes, lives, and relationships.

== Cast ==
=== Main ===
- Ha Seok-jin as Kim Ji-woon, a man from a prominent family who ends up working as a housekeeper.
- Bona as Im Da-young, an ambitious intern at an advertising company who tries to become a full-time employee and inherited both a house and a debt from her father.
- Lee Ji-hoon as Kwon Jin-kook, a skilled lawyer with a wealthy background.
- Go Won-hee as Yoon Sang-ah, a jewelry designer.
- Jeon Soo-jin as Kang Hye-joo, an accessory seller who has a complicated relationship with her boyfriend.
- Seo Eun-ah as Han So-mi, a nail shop owner who is scared of men after going through a traumatic event in the past.

=== Supporting ===
==== People around Ji-woon ====
- Jo Hee-bong as Go Tae-soo
- Yeon Joon-seok as Park Ga-ram

==== People around Da-young ====
- Yoon Joo-sang as Jang Yong-geon
- Jeong Suk-yong as Da-young's Team Leader
- Lee Min-young as Ahn Jin-hong
- Im Ji-kyu as Oh Yoon-gi
- Kim Min-seok as Seo Ho-gi
- Song Sang-eun as Baek Jang-mi
- Inoa as Choi Na-ri

==== Others ====
- Lee Do-gyeom as Bang Cheol-su
- Kim Seon-ho as Yong-joon (cameo)

== Production ==
The first script reading of the cast was held on May 21, 2018 at KBS Annex Broadcasting Station in Yeouido.

== Original soundtrack ==
Your House Helper OST

Soundtrack album by Various Artists
- Released: 2018
- Genre: Soundtrack
- Language: Korean
- Labels: withHC, VLENDING

=== Part 1 ===
Released on July 11, 2018
No.	Title	Lyrics	Music	Artist	Length
1.	"Good Day" (좋은 하루)	Shim Hyeon-bo	Park Seong-jin	SBGB	04:00
2.	"Good Day (Inst.)" (좋은 하루 (Inst.))		Park Seong-jin		04:00
Total length:					08:00

=== Part 2 ===
Released on July 12, 2018
No.	Title	Lyrics	Music	Artist	Length
1.	"The Sea Of You" (너라는 바다)	MATHI, Park Geun-chul, Jung Su-min	Park Geun-chul, Jung Su-min	Sanchez	04:55
2.	"The Sea Of You (Inst.)" (너라는 바다 (Inst.))		Park Geun-chul, Jung Su-min		04:55
Total length:					09:50

=== Part 3 ===
Released on July 19, 2018
No.	Title	Lyrics	Music	Artist	Length
1.	"Cat Butler" (고양이 집사)	Shim Hyun-bo	Park Sung-jin, Choi Min-chang	ABRY	03:05
2.	"Cat Butler (Inst.)" (고양이 집사 (Inst.))		Park Sung-jin, Choi Min-chang		03:05
Total length:					06:10

=== Part 4 ===
Released on July 26, 2018
No.	Title	Lyrics	Music	Artist	Length
1.	"Someday"	MATHI, Park Geun-chul, Jung Su-min	Park Geun-chul, Jung Su-min	Jang Na-ra	03:31
2.	"Someday (Inst.)"		Park Geun-chul, Jung Su-min		03:31
Total length:					07:02

=== Part 5 ===
Released on August 9, 2018
No.	Title	Lyrics	Music	Artist	Length
1.	"Smile Again"	MATHI, Park Geun-chul, Jung Su-min	Park Geun-chul, Jung Su-min	Juniel	04:07
2.	"Smile Again (Inst.)"		Park Geun-chul, Jung Su-min		04:07
Total length:					08:14

=== Part 6 ===
Released on August 15, 2018
No.	Title	Lyrics	Music	Artist	Length
1.	"You You"	Park Jeong-wook, Kim Joon-il, Sujin	Park Jeong-wook	PAXCHILD	03:11
2.	"You You (Inst.)"		Park Jeong-wook		03:11
Total length:					06:22

== Ratings ==
Ep.	Original broadcast date	Average audience share			
Ep.	Original broadcast date	TNmS		Nielsen Korea	
Ep.	Original broadcast date	Nationwide	Seoul	Nationwide	Seoul
1	July 4, 2018	4.5%	4.6%	4.1%	4.2%
2	July 4, 2018	4.6%	4.8%	4.1%	4.3%
3	July 5, 2018	3.5%	3.7%	3.2%	3.4%
4	July 5, 2018	4.4%	4.5%	4.0%	4.1%
5	July 11, 2018	4.0%	4.2%	3.6%	3.8%
6	July 11, 2018	4.7%	4.9%	4.3%	4.5%
7	July 12, 2018	3.6%	3.7%	3.2%	3.3%
8	July 12, 2018	4.3%	4.5%	3.9%	4.1%
9	July 18, 2018	4.1%	4.3%	3.7%	3.9%
10	July 18, 2018	4.4%	4.6%	4.0%	4.2%
11	July 19, 2018	3.8%	4.0%	3.5%	3.6%
12	July 19, 2018	4.9%	5.1%	4.5%	4.7%
13	July 25, 2018	2.7%	2.8%	2.3%	2.4%
14	July 25, 2018	3.1%	3.2%	2.7%	2.8%
15	July 26, 2018	3.5%	3.6%	3.1%	3.3%
16	July 26, 2018	4.4%	4.5%	4.0%	4.1%
17	August 1, 2018	3.3%	3.4%	3.0%	3.1%
18	August 1, 2018	3.6%	3.7%	3.2%	3.3%
19	August 2, 2018	3.0%	3.1%	2.6%	2.7%
20	August 2, 2018	3.5%	3.6%	3.1%	3.2%
21	August 8, 2018	3.4%	3.5%	3.0%	3.1%
22	August 8, 2018	3.8%	3.9%	3.4%	3.5%}
23	August 9, 2018	2.9%	3.0%	2.5%	2.6%
24	August 9, 2018	3.6%	3.7%	3.2%	3.3%
25	August 15, 2018 (Note: Aired earlier than usual due to the 2018 Asian Games football Group E match between South Korea and Bahrain.)	2.1%	2.2%	1.7%	1.8%
26	August 15, 2018	3.7%	3.9%	3.3%	3.5%
27	August 16, 2018	2.8%	3.0%	2.4%	2.6%
28	August 16, 2018	3.1%	3.5%	2.7%	3.0%
29	August 22, 2018	3.1%	3.4%	2.7%	3.2%
30	August 22, 2018	3.6%	3.8%	3.2%	3.4%
31	August 29, 2018 (Note: No episodes were aired on August 23 due to coverage of the 2018 Asian Games.)	3.3%	3.5%	2.9%	3.0%
32	August 29, 2018	3.4%	3.6%	3.0%	3.1%
In the table above, the blue numbers represent the lowest ratings and the red numbers represent the highest ratings.

== Awards and nominations ==
Year	Award	Category	Nominee	Result	Ref.
2018	2018 KBS Drama Awards	Excellence Award, Actor in a Miniseries	Ha Seok-jin	Nominated	
