= Bravo, My Life (TV series) =

2022 South Korean television daily drama

- Promotional poster
- Hangul: 으라차차 내 인생
- Lit.: Uhrachacha My Life
- RR: Eurachacha nae insaeng
- MR: Ŭrach'ach'a nae insaeng
- Genre: Drama; Romantic comedy; Family
- Created by: Ki Min-soo; KBS Drama Division
- Written by: Gu Ji-won; Jang Mon-woo
- Directed by: Seong Jun-hae
- Starring: Nam Sang-ji; Yang Byung-yeol; Lee Si-gang; Cha Min-ji
- Music by: Choi In-hee
- Country of origin: South Korea
- Original language: Korean
- No. of episodes: 120

Production
- Executive producers: Kim Sang-hwi (KBS); Hwang Eui-kyung (Monster Union)
- Producer: Hong Seok-gu
- Camera setup: Single-camera
- Running time: 35 minutes
- Production company: Monster Union

Original release
- Network: KBS1
- Release: April 11 – September 30, 2022

Bravo, My Life (Korean: 으라차차 내 인생) is a 2022 South Korean television series starring Nam Sang-ji, Yang Byung-yeol, Lee Si-gang and Cha Min-ji. The series, directed by Seong Jun-hae, revolves around Seo Dong-hee, a single mother who chooses to be her nephew's mother. It also depicts her struggle during the course of life. The daily drama premiered on KBS1 on April 11, 2022, and aired every weekday at 20:30 (KST) for 120 episodes.

== Cast and characters ==
=== Main ===
- Nam Sang-ji as Seo Dong-hee

27 years old, a single mother who chooses to become the mother of her nephew.

- Yang Byung-yeol as Kang Cha-yeol

A second-generation chaebol with brains and looks. After his father passed away, he was adopted by his uncle In-gyu.

- Lee Si-gang as Kang Seong-wook, the only son of the second-generation Inha fashion conglomerate.
- Cha Min-ji as Baek Seung-joo, a college friend having a crush on Kang Cha-yeol and the marketing manager of Inha Fashion.

=== Supporting ===
==== Dong-hee family ====
- Lee Han-wi as Kim Jeong-ho

61 years old, Seo Dong-hee's uncle, Seo Him-chan's grand uncle, Kim Hye-na's grandfather.

- Kim Hee-jung as Seo Myeong-sook

59 years old, Seo Dong-hee's aunt, Seo Him-chan's grand aunt, Kim Hye-na's grandmother.

- Lim Chae-won as Kim Jong-un

47 years old, she has spent 10 years as a committed playwright.

- Kum Ho-seok as Kim Tae-pyung

33 years old, divorced, he has an easygoing personality and life. Seo Dong-hee's Cousin, Kim Jeong-ho & Seo Myeong-sook's Son.

- Hong Ah-reum as Park Ja-young

33 years old, after divorce from Tae-Pyung, she is a single mother raising a daughter. She runs a beauty salon and works day and night with the determination to raise her daughter Hye-na as good as anyone else.

- Kim Ha-yeon as Kim Hye-na

13 years old, Tae-pyung and Ja-young's daughter. Seo Him-Chan's once-removed-cousin.

- Kim Young-ok as Seo Dong-hee's grandmother and Myungsook's mother.
- Seol Jung-hwan as Seo Jae-seok

Seo Dong-hee's older brother, he has deep brotherly friendship with her. He is a student preparing for the bar exam.

- Kim Si-woo as Seo Him-chan

Donghee's nephew, Jae-seok and Seung-joo's son. Kim Jeong-ho & Seo Myeong-sook's grandnephew. Kim Hye-na's once-removed-cousin.

==== Inha family ====
- Sunwoo Jae-duk as Kang In-gyu :60 years old, representative of In-ha Fashion and Kang Seong-wook's father.
- Park Hae-mi as Choi Mi Kyung

59 years old, wife of Kang In-gyu and Kang Seong-wook's mother.

=== Others ===
- Jo Mi-ryung as Bang Hye-ran, mother of Baek Seung-joo. She lived strong because of her husband, but faces a difficult reality due to the bankruptcy of her husband's company.
- Lee Dae-yeon as Jang Hyun-seok, he runs 'Hana Mandu', and a neighbor who is loved for his simple and good looks even though he is very wealthy. He is like a benefactor to Dong-hee (single mother) and a strong supporter.
- Kim Do-kyung as Lee Jong-min, is Seo Dong-hee's colleague.
- Kwon Dong-won as Seo Jae-Seok's friend.
- Kang Hyeon-jung as Jo Ki-ja

== Production ==
Writer Gu Ji-won is writing after three years as Gu last wrote KBS1's daily drama Home for Summer in 2019. On February 28, it was reported that Yang Byung-yeol was confirmed for the male lead of the series. He takes on the role of a second generation chaebol, who has good brains and a warm-hearted appearance. Nam Sang-ji was confirmed to play the female lead in the series. On March 16, it was announced that Lee Si-gang was confirmed for the role of a second-generation chaebol character. Cha Min-ji was confirmed to play as head of Inha Fashion Design Marketing. Jo Mi-ryung and Kim Ha-yeon are working together for the second time as they previously appeared in KBS1 daily drama No Matter What, aired in 2020.

== Original soundtrack ==
Bravo, My Life

Soundtrack album by Various
- Released: 2022
- Genre: Soundtrack
- Languages: Korean; English
- Labels: Danal Entertainment; Yogurt Studio

Part 1

Released on April 16, 2022
No.	Title	Lyrics	Music	Artist	Length
1.	"Realize"	Major League	Major League	Yeo Eun	4:14
2.	"Realize" (Inst.)				4:14

Original Soundtrack Parts 2–38

Part 2

Released on April 23, 2022
No.	Title	Lyrics	Artist	Length
1.	"Look Me"	Safira.K, coma	Safira.K (Safira K)	3:47
2.	"Look Me" (Inst.)			3:47

Part 3

Released on April 24, 2022
No.	Title	Lyrics	Music	Artist	Length
1.	"Don't Do It" (그러지마요)	Undefeated, Playing Child (high seAson)	Undefeated, SaFira K--Look Me	Moses	4:30
2.	"Don't Do It" (Inst.)				4:30

Part 4

Released on April 30, 2022
No.	Title	Lyrics	Music	Artist	Length
1.	"You Are Beautiful Too" (그대도 아름답다)	Kang Woo-kyung	Park Hyeon-am	Celine	3:46
2.	"You Are Beautiful Too" (Inst.)				3:46

Part 5

Released on May 1, 2022
No.	Title	Lyrics	Music	Artist	Length
1.	"Because of you, my day is brilliant" (너로 인해 내 오늘은 찬란해)	Major Leaguer	Ha Heon-je, Major Leaguer	Ahn Ye-seul	3:51
2.	"Because of you, my day is brilliant" (Inst.)				3:51

Part 6

Released on May 7, 2022
No.	Title	Lyrics	Music	Artist	Length
1.	"Always by your side" (언제나 네 곁에)	Seyoung Jeong	1Take, Joanna Jo, Sujin Jeon	Jeong Se-young	3:31
2.	"Always by your side" (Inst.)				3:31

Part 7

Released on May 8, 2022
No.	Title	Lyrics	Music	Artist	Length
1.	"Even if I wait and wait" (기다리고 기다려봐도)	Unbeaten	Undefeated, Lee Joo-yong	Song Min-kyung	3:40
2.	"Even if I wait and wait" (Inst.)				3:40

Part 8

Released on May 14, 2022
No.	Title	Lyrics	Music	Artist	Length
1.	"Here's My Heart" (여기 맘이)	GLODY, Invincible	GLODY, Invincible	Morning Coffee	3:32
2.	"Here's My Heart" (Inst.)				3:32

Part 9

Released on May 15, 2022
No.	Title	Lyrics	Music	Artist	Length
1.	"If I'm With You" (너와 함께 있다면)	Invincible, Jeong Yun-kyung	Invincible	Han Kyung-il	3:41
2.	"If I'm With You" (Inst.)				3:41

Part 10

Released on May 21, 2022
No.	Title	Lyrics	Music	Artist	Length
1.	"In the end we break up again" (결국 또 헤어지네요)	Undefeated	Lee Ju-yong	RAN	3:50
2.	"In the end we break up again" (Inst.)				3:50

Part 11

Released on May 22, 2022
No.	Title	Lyrics	Music	Artist	Length
1.	"Do You Know" (그대 아나요)	Undefeated, Jamie	Undefeated, Jamie, Lee Joo-yong	Kim Min-wool	3:54
2.	"Do You Know" (Inst.)				3:54

Part 12

Released on May 28, 2022
No.	Title	Lyrics	Music	Artist	Length
1.	"Love Again" (다시는 사랑은)	Undefeated, Playing Child (high seAson)	Undefeated, Choi Woong-jin (high seAson), Playing Child (high seAson)	The Daisy	4:18
2.	"Love Again" (Inst.)				4:18

Part 13

Released on May 29, 2022
No.	Title	Lyrics	Music	Artist	Length
1.	"Goodbye Days I Loved" (사랑했던 날들아 안녕)	Invincible	Invincible	Lydia	3:47
2.	"Goodbye Days I Loved" (Inst.)				3:47

Part 14

Released on June 4, 2022
No.	Title	Lyrics	Music	Artist	Length
1.	"Love is a Bubble" (사랑은 버블)	Rabbit Punch (Hello Good Boy, Lee Dong-young	Rabbit Punch (Hello Good Boy, Lee Dong-young, Kim Min-kyu)	Coda Bridge	3:21
2.	"Love is a Bubble" (Inst.)				3:21

Part 15

Released on June 5, 2022
No.	Title	Lyrics	Music	Artist	Length
1.	"I can't do anything like love again" (다시는 사랑같은 거 할 수가 없어)	Invincible, Sok Sok	Invincible, Sok Sok, Joo-yong Lee	Yoon Tae-Hwa	3:20
2.	"I can't do anything like love again" (Inst.)				3:20

Part 16

Released on June 11, 2022
No.	Title	Lyrics	Music	Artist	Length
1.	"Love doesn't hurt, it hurts because of people" (사랑이 아픈게 아니라 사람 때문에 아프더라)	Major league	Major league	Na Tae-joo	4:04
2.	"Love doesn't hurt, it hurts because of people" (Inst.)				4:04

Part 17

Released on June 12, 2022
No.	Title	Lyrics	Music	Artist	Length
1.	"Dried Flower" (말린꽃)	Major league	Major league	Runaway	3:54
2.	"Dried Flower" (Inst.)				3:54

Part 18

Released on June 18, 2022
No.	Title	Lyrics	Music	Artist	Length
1.	"As We Are Now" (우리 지금 이대로)	Choi Jeong-cheol	Park Kang-young, Shim Jae-woong	Choi Jeong-cheol	4:12
2.	"As We Are Now" (Inst.)				4:12

Part 19

Released on June 19, 2022
No.	Title	Lyrics	Music	Artist	Length
1.	"About Alone" (홀로에 관하여)	Kang Woo-kyung	Park Hyeon-am	Hwang Garam	3:38
2.	"About Alone" (Inst.)				3:38

Part 20

Released on June 25, 2022
No.	Title	Lyrics	Music	Artist	Length
1.	"After Breaking Up" (헤어지고 나서야)	Invincible, Sok-hee	Invincible, Sok-hee, Joo-yong	Vivian (BBAHN)	3:41
2.	"After Breaking Up" (Inst.)				3:41

Part 21

Released on July 2, 2022
No.	Title	Lyrics	Music	Artist	Length
1.	"Now I Can't Love You" (이제는 나 사랑할 수 없게 됐어)	Absolute Victory, Sok Suk	Absolute Victory, Sok Sak Hee, Ju-Yong Lee	Seo J	3:33
2.	"Now I Can't Love You" (Inst.)				3:33

Part 22

Released on July 3, 2022
No.	Title	Lyrics	Music	Artist	Length
1.	"One Day"	Koh-yeong-shik (major league), Lim Seong-hee	Koh Byung-sik (major leaguer), buzzer beater, Lim Seong-hee, Lee Sung-sung	Oneyears	3:53
2.	"One Day" (Inst.)				3:53

Part 23

Released on July 9, 2022
No.	Title	Lyrics	Music	Artist	Length
1.	"Be My Love"	Absolute Victory	Absolute Victory, Lee Dong-Young	NINE.i	3:31
2.	"Be My Love" (Inst.)				3:31

Part 24

Released on July 10, 2022
No.	Title	Lyrics	Music	Artist	Length
1.	"Love is You" (사랑은 너야)	Undefeated	Unbeatable, Lee Joo-yong	Moving Eun (Liar Band)	3:39
2.	"Love is You" (Inst.)				3:39

Part 25

Released on July 16, 2022
No.	Title	Lyrics	Music	Artist	Length
1.	"Tomorrow Will Be Better Than Today" (오늘보다 내일은 더 좋을거야)	Brown	Invincible	The Bridge	3:07
2.	"Tomorrow Will Be Better Than Today" (Inst.)				3:07

Part 26

Released on July 17, 2022
No.	Title	Lyrics	Music	Artist	Length
1.	"I'll Be Like This For a While" (한동안 나는 이럴 것 같아)	Pil-seung-hee, Sok-hee, Jung Yun-kyung	Undefeated, Sok-hee	Woo Yi Kyung	3:47
2.	"I'll Be Like This For a While" (Inst.)				3:47

Part 27

Released on July 23, 2022
No.	Title	Lyrics	Music	Artist	Length
1.	"My Heart Hurts" (한가빈마음이 아프지만)	Undefeated, Glody	Undefeated, Glody	Gabin Han	3:37
2.	"My Heart Hurts" (Inst.)				3:37

Part 28

Released on July 24, 2022
No.	Title	Lyrics	Music	Artist	Length
1.	"I Want to Hold You" (붙잡고 싶어)	Undefeated, Sok Sok	Undefeated, Sok Sok, Joo-yong	Rumy	3:27
2.	"I Want to Hold You" (Inst.)				3:27

Part 29

Released on July 30, 2022
No.	Title	Lyrics	Music	Artist	Length
1.	"What should I do, I can't do anything" (어떡하죠 아무것도 못하겠어)	Win Undefeated	Win Undefeated, Joo-yong	Sookhee	3:41
2.	"What should I do, I can't do anything" (Inst.)				3:41

Part 30

Released on July 31, 2022
No.	Title	Lyrics	Music	Artist	Length
1.	"Dancer" (무희)	Go Byeong-shik (major leaguer), Kang Rin	Go Byeong-sik (major leaguer), buzzer beater, Lee Sung-sung	Moon Geun Jo	3:50
2.	"Dancer" (Inst.)				3:50

Part 31

Released on August 6, 2022
No.	Title	Lyrics	Music	Artist	Length
1.	"I'm About to Go Crazy" (미치기 직전이야)	Glody, undefeated	Glody, undefeated	Hello Bonjour	3:28
2.	"I'm About to Go Crazy" (Inst.)				3:28

Part 32

Released on August 7, 2022
No.	Title	Lyrics	Music	Artist	Length
1.	"Do We Break Up Like This" (우리 이렇게 헤어지나요)	Undefeated, Project 632	Undefeated, Sok Sok-hee	Song Pu Reum	3:44
2.	"Do We Break Up Like This" (Inst.)				3:44

Part 33

Released on August 13, 2022
No.	Title	Lyrics	Music	Artist	Length
1.	"Don't Even Start" (시작하지도 말걸)	Undefeated, Sok Sok-hee,	Undefeated, Sok Sok-hee, Lee Joo-yong	Gold Dynasty	3:36
2.	"Don't Even Start" (Inst.)				3:36

Part 34

Released on August 14, 2022
No.	Title	Lyrics	Music	Artist	Length
1.	"I still can't feel it" (아직도 실감이 안나서)	Undefeated, Sok Sok-hee,	Undefeated, Sok Sok-hee, Lee Joo-yong	KOYO	4:16
2.	"I still can't feel it" (Inst.)				4:16

Part 35

Released on September 3, 2022
No.	Title	Lyrics	Music	Artist	Length
1.	"I didn't know love could hurt so much" (사랑이 이렇게 아픈 건 줄 미처 몰랐었어)	Victory and Undefeated, Minwool Kim	Victory and Undefeated, Kim Min-ul, Shim Gyu-tae	Hwang Si-yeon	3:29
2.	"I didn't know love could hurt so much" (Inst.)				3:29

Part 36

Released on September 4, 2022
No.	Title	Lyrics	Music	Artist	Length
1.	"Break Up" (헤어짐)	Win and lose, children who play (high seAson)	Undefeated, Undefeated Choi Woongjin (high seAson), Playing Children (high seAson)	Kim Dae-Hoon	3:13
2.	"Break Up" (Inst.)				3:13

Part 37

Released on September 9, 2022
No.	Title	Lyrics	Music	Artist	Length
1.	"I only knew it was okay" (괜찮은 줄만 알았었는데)	Undefeated, Sok Sok-hee	Undefeated, Sok Sok-hee, Lee Joo-yong	J Sera	3:35
2.	"I only knew it was okay" (Inst.)				3:35

Part 38

Released on September 12, 2022
No.	Title	Lyrics	Music	Artist	Length
1.	"How Can You Do It" (어떻게 그럴 수 있어)	Undefeated, The Daisy	Undefeated, The Daisy	meme (mim)	3:36
2.	"How Can You Do It" (Inst.)				3:36

Part 39

Released on September 18, 2022
No.	Title	Lyrics	Music	Artist	Length
1.	"I love you like the first day" (사랑합니다 처음 그날처럼)	Win, Undefeated	Win, Undefeated	Cheon Soa	3:22
2.	"I love you like the first day" (Inst.)				3:22

== Viewership ==
Bravo, My Life : South Korea viewers per episode (millions)

Episodes of	Episode number																			
Episodes of	1	2	3	4	5	6	7	8	9	10	11	12	13	14	15	16	17	18	19	20
1–20	2.741	2.419	2.381	2.670	2.415	2.752	2.590	2.568	2.793	2.580	2.674	2.552	2.750	2.686	2.617	2.811	2.631	2.444	2.621	2.327
21-40	2.623	2.542	2.646	2.412	2.361	2.437	2.334	2.575	2.439	2.459	2.732	2.419	2.637	2.467	2.085	2.376	2.544	2.718	2.797	2.819
41-60	2.595	2.598	2.611	2.866	2.676	2.603	2.721	2.692	2.778	2.941	2.640	2.861	2.822	2.856	2.806	2.420	2.921	2.893	2.801	2.909
61-80	2.691	2.882	2.924	2.833	2.857	2.613	2.975	2.844	2.905	3.113	2.936	3.078	3.081	2.925	3.186	2.942	3.275	3.123	3.033	3.028
81-100	2.915	3.123	3.084	3.020	2.980	2.775	3.274	3.034	2.899	2.936	2.944	3.170	2.917	2.978	2.941	3.087	3.179	3.099	3.218	3.087
101-120	3.091	3.037	3.162	1.830	2.544	3.382	3.172	3.118	3.173	3.067	3.235	3.187	2.982	3.021	2.726	3.159	2.807	3.067	3.236	2.932

Source: Audience measurement performed nationwide by Nielsen Korea.

Average TV viewership ratings
Ep.	Original broadcast date	Average audience share		
Ep.	Original broadcast date	Nielsen Korea		TNmS
Ep.	Original broadcast date	Nationwide	Seoul	Nationwide
1	April 11, 2022	17.3% (1st)	15.7% (1st)	—N/a
2	April 12, 2022	15.4% (2nd)	14.0% (2nd)	14.8% (2nd)
3	April 13, 2022	14.9% (2nd)	13.0% (2nd)	16.0% (1st)
4	April 14, 2022	16.4% (1st)	14.2% (1st)	16.4% (1st)
5	April 15, 2022	14.7% (1st)	13.9% (1st)	14.0% (1st)
6	April 18, 2022	17.2% (1st)	16.0% (1st)	16.8% (1st)
7	April 19, 2022	15.6% (2nd)	15.1% (1st)	15.8% (1st)
8	April 20, 2022	15.9% (1st)	14.8% (1st)	16.7% (1st)
9	April 21, 2022	17.0% (1st)	15.8% (1st)	16.9% (1st)
10	April 22, 2022	16.1% (1st)	14.7% (1st)	15.9% (1st)
11	April 25, 2022	16.9% (1st)	14.9% (1st)	17.3% (1st)
12	April 26, 2022	16.2% (1st)	15.2% (1st)	16.1% (1st)
13	April 27, 2022	16.5% (1st)	15.3% (1st)	16.6% (1st)
14	April 28, 2022	16.9% (1st)	14.7% (1st)	17.3% (1st)
15	April 29, 2022	16.1% (1st)	14.4% (1st)	16.0% (1st)
16	May 2, 2022	17.1% (1st)	15.1% (1st)	17.4% (1st)
17	May 3, 2022	16.7% (1st)	15.3% (1st)	16.5% (1st)
18	May 4, 2022	15.7% (1st)	14.3% (1st)	15.8% (1st)
19	May 5, 2022	16.2% (1st)	14.5% (1st)	16.6% (1st)
20	May 6, 2022	14.7% (1st)	14.2% (1st)	14.4% (1st)
21	May 9, 2022	16.5% (1st)	14.5% (1st)	16.4% (1st)
22	May 10, 2022	15.9% (1st)	14.4% (1st)	14.7% (2nd)
23	May 16, 2022 (Note: The 23rd episode was cancelled for May 11, 12 and 13, due to telecast of debate for Incheon Mayor, which was broadcast live for 2 hours from 19.00 hrs on the 11th and 12th)	16.6% (1st)	14.8% (1st)	17.0% (1st)
24	May 17, 2022	15.1% (2nd)	13.8% (1st)	14.6% (1st)
25	May 18, 2022	15.0% (1st)	13.5% (1st)	15.3% (1st)
26	May 19, 2022	15.3% (1st)	13.6% (1st)	15.2% (1st)
27	May 20, 2022	14.5% (1st)	12.8% (1st)	14.3% (1st)
28	May 23, 2022	16.0% (1st)	14.0% (1st)	16.5% (1st)
29	May 24, 2022	15.7% (1st)	13.7% (1st)	15.5% (1st)
30	May 25, 2022	15.3% (1st)	13.8% (1st)	16.5% (1st)
31	May 26, 2022	16.7% (1st)	14.8% (1st)	16.2% (1st)
32	May 27, 2022	14.7% (1st)	12.9% (1st)	15.2% (1st)
33	May 30, 2022	16.2% (1st)	14.0% (1st)	17.4% (1st)
34	May 31, 2022	15.2% (1st)	13.1% (1st)	15.3% (1st)
35	June 2, 2022	12.9% (1st)	11.2% (1st)	14.5% (1st)
36	June 3, 2022	14.7% (1st)	13.4% (1st)	15.4% (1st)
37	June 6, 2022	15.2% (1st)	13.9% (1st)	15.4% (1st)
38	June 7, 2022	16.7% (1st)	15.1% (1st)	17.2% (1st)
39	June 8, 2022	17.3% (1st)	15.8% (1st)	16.1% (1st)
40	June 9, 2022	17.8% (1st)	15.6% (1st)	17.8% (1st)
41	June 10, 2022	16.0% (1st)	14.6% (1st)	15.6% (1st)
42	June 13, 2022	16.8% (1st)	14.8% (1st)	17.6% (1st)
43	June 14, 2022	16.3% (1st)	14.3% (1st)	16.3% (1st)
44	June 15, 2022	17.8% (1st)	16.4% (1st)	17.6% (1st)
45	June 16, 2022	16.8% (1st)	15.2% (1st)	18.3% (1st)
46	June 17, 2022	15.8% (1st)	14.2% (1st)	17.2% (1st)
47	June 20, 2022	16.9% (1st)	14.5% (1st)	17.2% (1st)
48	June 21, 2022	16.7% (1st)	14.9% (1st)	17.5% (1st)
49	June 22, 2022	16.8% (1st)	14.6% (1st)	18.4% (1st)
50	June 23, 2022	18.1% (1st)	15.8% (1st)	18.2% (1st)
51	June 24, 2022	16.1% (1st)	13.7% (1st)	16.1% (1st)
52	June 27, 2022	17.3% (1st)	14.9% (1st)	19.4% (1st)
53	June 28, 2022	17.2% (1st)	15.0% (1st)	18.8% (1st)
54	June 29, 2022	17.6% (1st)	15.5% (1st)	19.1% (1st)
55	June 30, 2022	17.5% (1st)	15.0% (1st)	17.4% (1st)
56	July 1, 2022	15.4% (1st)	13.0% (1st)	15.5% (1st)
57	July 4, 2022	18.4% (1st)	15.7% (1st)	17.6% (1st)
58	July 5, 2022	17.9% (1st)	15.2% (1st)	17.2% (1st)
59	July 6, 2022	17.4% (1st)	14.7% (1st)	17.5% (1st)
60	July 7, 2022	17.9% (1st)	16.0% (1st)	18.4% (1st)
61	July 8, 2022	16.7% (1st)	14.3% (1st)	—N/a
62	July 11, 2022	17.7% (1st)	15.3% (1st)	19.1% (1st)
63	July 12, 2022	17.8% (1st)	15.5% (1st)	18.5% (1st)
64	July 13, 2022	18.0% (1st)	15.4% (1st)	19.5% (1st)
65	July 14, 2022	18.3% (1st)	16.1% (1st)	18.2% (1st)
66	July 15, 2022	16.6% (1st)	14.7% (1st)	17.7% (1st)
67	July 18, 2022	18.3% (1st)	15.6% (1st)	20.2% (1st)
68	July 19, 2022	17.3% (1st)	15.3% (1st)	18.5% (1st)
69	July 20, 2022	18.0% (1st)	15.9% (1st)	18.9% (1st)
70	July 21, 2022	19.0% (1st)	16.7% (1st)	19.4% (1st)
71	July 22, 2022	17.9% (1st)	16.2% (1st)	18.2% (1st)
72	July 25, 2022	19.5% (1st)	16.9% (1st)	19.7% (1st)
73	July 26, 2022	18.6% (1st)	16.1% (1st)	17.7% (1st)
74	July 27, 2022	18.3% (1st)	16.3% (1st)	18.2% (1st)
75	July 28, 2022	19.9% (1st)	17.9% (1st)	19.1% (1st)
76	July 29, 2022	18.3% (1st)	16.6% (1st)	19.1% (1st)
77	August 1, 2022	19.4% (1st)	16.5% (1st)	19.9% (1st)
78	August 2, 2022	18.6% (1st)	16.7% (1st)	18.5% (1st)
79	August 3, 2022	18.1% (1st)	15.8% (1st)	18.8% (1st)
80	August 4, 2022	18.2% (1st)	16.0% (1st)	18.3% (1st)
81	August 5, 2022	17.1% (1st)	14.6% (1st)	18.0% (1st)
82	August 8, 2022	18.6% (1st)	16.2% (1st)	18.5% (1st)
83	August 9, 2022	18.7% (1st)	16.9% (1st)	19.7% (1st)
84	August 10, 2022	18.5% (1st)	16.6% (1st)	—N/a
85	August 11, 2022	18.5% (1st)	16.1% (1st)	—N/a
86	August 12, 2022	16.9% (1st)	14.6% (1st)	18.1% (1st)
87	August 15, 2022	19.0% (1st)	16.6% (1st)	19.6% (1st)
88	August 16, 2022	18.6% (1st)	15.5% (1st)	19.7% (1st)
89	August 17, 2022	18.1% (1st)	15.6% (1st)	19.5% (1st)
90	August 18, 2022	17.9% (1st)	16.2% (1st)	18.8% (1st)
91	August 19, 2022	18.0% (1st)	16.4% (1st)	19.4% (1st)
92	August 22, 2022	19.3% (1st)	16.6% (1st)	20.1% (1st)
93	August 23, 2022	18.2% (1st)	15.6% (1st)	18.5% (1st)
94	August 24, 2022	18.3% (1st)	16.3% (1st)	18.6% (1st)
95	August 25, 2022	18.7% (1st)	16.2% (1st)	20.6% (1st)
96	August 29, 2022 (Note: The 96th episode was cancelled for August 26, due to broadcast an exclusive interview with Pope Francis.)	19.5% (1st)	17.4% (1st)	19.8% (1st)
97	August 30, 2022	19.5% (1st)	16.7% (1st)	18.3% (1st)
98	August 31, 2022	18.6% (1st)	15.5% (1st)	18.9% (1st)
99	September 1, 2022	19.3% (1st)	16.9% (1st)	20.0% (1st)
100	September 2, 2022	18.7% (1st)	16.3% (1st)	20.4% (1st)
101	September 6, 2022 (Note: The 101st episode was cancelled for September 5, due to broadcast of disaster broadcasts.)	19.0% (1st)	17.2% (1st)	20.2% (1st)
102	September 7, 2022	18.8% (1st)	17.0% (1st)	19.0% (1st)
103	September 8, 2022	18.8% (1st)	17.0% (1st)	19.6% (1st)
104	September 9, 2022	10.6% (2nd)	9.7% (2nd)	—N/a
105	September 9, 2022	14.7% (1st)	13.0% (1st)	—N/a
106	September 12, 2022	19.6% (1st)	17.5% (1st)	20.2% (1st)
107	September 13, 2022	18.9% (1st)	16.7% (1st)	20.0% (1st)
108	September 14, 2022	19.0% (1st)	16.7% (1st)	19.7% (1st)
109	September 15, 2022	19.0% (1st)	16.5% (1st)	19.6% (1st)
110	September 16, 2022	18.3% (1st)	16.1% (1st)	19.0% (1st)
111	September 19, 2022	20.1% (1st)	17.3% (1st)	20.3% (1st)
112	September 20, 2022	19.7% (1st)	17.2% (1st)	19.9% (1st)
112	September 20, 2022	19.7% (1st)	17.2% (1st)	19.9% (1st)
113	September 21, 2022	18.7% (1st)	17.1% (1st)	20.1% (1st)
114	September 22, 2022	19.0% (1st)	16.6% (1st)	18.0% (1st)
115	September 23, 2022	17.4% (1st)	15.3% (1st)	18.2% (1st)
116	September 26, 2022	19.2% (1st)	16.8% (1st)	20.7% (1st)
117	September 27, 2022	17.4% (1st)	15.5% (1st)	19.0% (1st)
118	September 28, 2022	18.6% (1st)	17.0% (1st)	19.8% (1st)
119	September 29, 2022	20.2% (1st)	17.5% (1st)	19.9% (1st)
120	September 30, 2022	17.7% (1st)	15.7% (1st)	17.8% (1st)
Average		17.326%	15.331%	17.823% (Note: This average ratings is calculated based on the published ratings, the exact average ratings is unknown due to multiple ratings not published.)
In the table above, the blue numbers represent the lowest ratings and the red numbers represent the highest ratings.; NR denotes that the series did not rank in the top 20 daily programs on that date.; N/A denotes that the rating is not known.

== Accolades ==
Award ceremony	Year	Category	Nominee	Result	Ref.
KBS Drama Awards	2022	Excellence Award, Actor in a Daily Drama	Yang Byung-yeol	Won	
KBS Drama Awards	2022	Excellence Award, Actress in a Daily Drama	Nam Sang-ji	Nominated	
KBS Drama Awards	2022	Best Young Actor	Kim Si-woo	Nominated	
KBS Drama Awards	2022	Best Young Actress	Kim Ha-yeon	Nominated	
