= Lee Do-gyeom =

South Korean actor (born 1990)

- Born: Lee Do-gyeom; 19 January 1990 (age 36); South Korea
- Other name: Lee Do-kyeom
- Education: Korea National University of Arts
- Occupations: Actor; model
- Years active: 2010–present
- Agent: Inyeon Entertainment
- Known for: While You Were Sleeping; Solomon's Perjury; Your House Helper

Lee Do-gyeom (Korean: 이도겸) is a South Korean actor and model. He is best known for his roles in dramas such as While You Were Sleeping, Solomon's Perjury and Your House Helper.

== Filmography ==
=== Television series ===
Year	Title	Role	Ref.
2016-2017	Solomon's Perjury	Lee Sung-min	
2017	Naked Fireman	Joon-ho	
2017	The Rebel	Do-ho	
2017	While You Were Sleeping	Myung Dae-gu	
2017	Prison Playbook	Officer Park	
2018	My Ex Diary	Kang-min	
2018	Your House Helper	Bang Chul-soo	
2018	My Healing Love	Im Joo-chul	
2019	Rookie Historian Goo Hae-ryung	Official member	
2019	Melting Me Softly	Baek Yeong-tak	
2022	Again My Life	Park Seung-wan	
2023–2024	Unpredictable Family	Kang Sun-woo	

=== Film ===
Year	Title	Role	Language	Ref.
2010	The Man from Nowhere	Child at workplace	Korean	
2021	Mission: Possible	Hotel staff	Korean	
