= Nam Sang-ji =

South Korean actress (born 1989)

- Born: December 14, 1989 (age 36); Bongsan-myeon, Gimcheon, South Korea
- Education: Department of Acting, Kyonggi University
- Occupation: Actress
- Years active: 2013–present
- Agent: Bingo One Ent Co

Korean name
- Hangul: 남상지
- Hanja: 南尚智
- RR: Nam Sangji
- MR: Nam Sangji

Nam Sang-ji (Korean: 남상지; born on December 14, 1989) is a South Korean actress. She made her acting debut in 2013 film Marriage Blue. Since then she has appeared in number of films. She is better known for her role in daily family drama Sisters-in-Law (2017). She appeared in films such as: Lucid Dream (2017) and Ashfall (2019) among others. In 2022, she is appearing as main lead of KBS's daily drama Bravo, My Life.

== Career ==
Nam Sang-ji is affiliated to artist management company Bingo One Ent Co. She made her debut in 2013 film Marriage Blue. She is alumni of Department of Acting, Kyonggi University.

In 2016 Nam appeared in period drama film Spirits' Homecoming portraying role of Zhao Fei. She also featured in its sequel Spirits' Homecoming, Unfinished Story. The film was a commercial success garnering more than 3.58 million viewers.

In 2017, she was seen in MBC's Sisters-in-Law as Park Ji-ho. she was praised for her "lovely charm" and "romantic acting". She was termed as "nice find".

In 2022, she got her first main role in KBS daily drama Bravo, My Life portraying a single mother who chooses to become mother of her nephew.

In 2026, Nam starred in KBS2's revenge drama Pearl in Red opposite Park Jin-hee.

== Filmography ==
=== Films ===
Year	Title	Role	Notes	Ref.
2013	Marriage Blue	Society employee		
2016	Spirits' Homecoming	Zhao Fei		
2016	The Last Princess	Orphanage schoolmistress		
2017	Lucid Dream	Soo-jin's hospital nurse		
2019	Ashfall	Nurse		
2019	Innocent Witness	Smiling female lawyer		
2020	The Singer	Young mistress		

=== Television series ===
Year	Title	Role	Notes	Ref.
2017	The Rebel			
2017	Sisters-in-Law	Park Ji-ho		
2022	Bravo, My Life	Seo Dong-hee		
2023	Woman in a Veil	Ae-ra	Cameo	
2023–2024	Unpredictable Family	Yoo Eun-sung		
2026	Pearl in Red	Baek Jin-ju / Chloe Lee		

== Awards and nominations ==
Name of the award ceremony, year presented, category, nominee of the award, and the result of the nomination
Award ceremony	Year	Category	Nominee / Work	Result	Ref.
KBS Drama Awards	2022	Best New Actress	Bravo, My Life	Nominated	
KBS Drama Awards	2022	Excellence Award, Actress in a Daily Drama	Bravo, My Life	Nominated	
