= Lee Si-a =

South Korean actress and singer (born 1990)

- Born: July 10, 1990 (age 36); Seoul, South Korea
- Education: Sungkyunkwan University – Performing Arts
- Occupations: Actress; singer
- Years active: 2011–present
- Agent: Earlybird Entertainment
- Musical career
- Genre: K-pop
- Years active: 2011–2013
- Labels: Trophy Entertainment; Tokuma Japan

Korean name
- Hangul: 이지아
- RR: I Jia
- MR: I Chia

Stage name
- Hangul: 이시아
- RR: I Sia
- MR: I Sia

Lee Si-a (Korean: 이시아; born July 10, 1990), birth name Lee Ji-a, is a South Korean actress and singer. She made her entertainment debut in 2011 as a member of the K-pop girl group CHI CHI. When Chi Chi disbanded in 2013, Lee turned to acting, and has appeared in television series such as More Than a Maid (2015), Signal (2016), and The Unusual Family (2016).

== Filmography ==
=== Film ===
Year	Title	Role	Ref.
2017	Lucid Dream	Mi-yeon	
2018	The Negotiation	Yoo Yeon-joo	
2019	Faceless Boss	Jeong Min-jeong	

=== Television series ===
Year	Title	Role	Notes	Ref.
2013	Hur Jun, The Original Story	Lady Yu (Gwanghae's wife)	Guest appearance	
2014	My Lovely Girl	Yoon So-eun		
2015	More Than a Maid	Heo Yoon-ok		
2015	Cheo Yong 2	Han Ji-soo	Special appearance, Ep. 6	
2015	Remember	Kim Han-na	Special appearance, Ep. 5–6	
2016	Signal	Kim Won-kyung (ep.3-4)		
2016	Doppelganger	Yeon-joo	Web drama	
2016	The Unusual Family	Kang Dan-yi		
2017	Tunnel	Shin Yeon-sook		
2017	Suspicious Partner	Lee Na-eun	Special appearance, Ep. 6	
2018	Mr. Sunshine	Choi Yoo-jin's mother	Special appearance	
2018	Let Me Introduce Her	Ji Eun-han		
2020	365: Repeat the Year	Seo Yeon-soo		
2021	Midnight Thriller – "Supermodel"	Lee Ji-eun		
2023	Korea–Khitan War	Queen Wonjeong		
2024	Flex X Cop	Kim Seon-young	Cameo (episode 4, 8–9)	
2025	The Queen Who Crowns	Yeong-sil		
2025	A Graceful Liar	Cha Jung-won / Joo Young-chae/Cha Soo-ah		

=== Television show ===
Year	Title	Role	Notes	Ref.
2013	Korean Art Idol Competition – Everyone Gather!	Contestant	Episode 1–3	

=== Music video appearances ===
Year	Song title	Artist	Ref.
2013	"Just Another Girl"	Kim Jae-joong	
