= A Graceful Liar =

2025 South Korean television series

- Promotional poster
- Hangul: 친밀한 리플리
- Lit.: Intimate Ripley
- RR: Chinmilhan Ripeulli
- MR: Ch'inmirhan Rip'ŭlli
- Genre: Melodrama; Revenge; Romance; Family; Thriller
- Written by: Lee Do-hyun
- Directed by: Son Seok-jin
- Starring: Lee Si-a; Lee Il-hwa; Seol Jung-hwan; Han Ki-woong; Lee Hyo-na
- Music by: Choi In-hee
- Ending theme: "To the End" by Redchair
- Country of origin: South Korea
- Original language: Korean
- No. of episodes: 101

Production
- Running time: 30 minutes
- Production companies: Neo Entertainment; Studio Bom

Original release
- Network: KBS2
- Release: September 22, 2025 – February 20, 2026

A Graceful Liar (Korean: 친밀한 리플리; RR: Chinmilhan Ripeulli) is a 2025–2026 South Korean television series written by Lee Do-hyun, directed by Son Seok-jin, and starring Lee Si-a, Lee Il-hwa, Seol Jung-hwan, Han Ki-woong, and Lee Hyo-na. The series unfolds as a daughter and mother who were bound by blood but separated for many years, becoming embroiled in a twisted game of lies and manipulation when they're reunited as in-laws. It aired on KBS2 from September 22, 2025, to February 20, 2026, every Monday to Friday at 19:50 (KST).

== Plot ==
Cha Jung-won, who has had a tough life after being abandoned by her biological mother and having her father falsely accused of murder, and growing up in poverty. Her so-called best friend, Joo Young-chae, betrayed her trust by stealing her design and getting accepted to study abroad. Although Jung-won thought she'd long moved on, Young-chae's betrayal still stung. But when Young-chae steals her design again, Jung-won decides she's had enough and sets out to reclaim what's rightfully hers, refusing to show kindness to someone who doesn't deserve it.

Joo Young-chae, who used to mockingly call Jung-won by her name, finds herself in a difficult situation. She asks Jung-won to impersonate her, allowing Young-chae to escape her controlling mother and start anew with her lover abroad. As Jung-won takes on Young-chae's identity, she's met with admiration, but slowly, her true self gets overshadowed. She enjoys being the rich daughter, and despite it being fake, she feels so alive. Before her wedding day to Jin Se-hoon, Jung-won discovers a shocking truth about her mother-in-law. A paternity test reveals they're connected by blood. Jung-won is fueled by resentment as she witnesses her mother's wealthy life with another family, a stark contrast to her own struggles. She sets her sights on revenge, plotting to marry her stepson and start a war of lies.

== Cast and characters ==
=== Main ===
- Lee Si-a as Cha Jung-won / Joo Young-chae / Jin Jung-won / Cha Soo-ah

Trapped in her own web of lies, Cha Jung-won loses herself as she tries to turn her fake identity as Jo Young-chae, the wealthy daughter of Gong Nan-sook, into reality. Her behavior increasingly exhibits symptoms of Ripley syndrome, as she rejects her true identity to escape the limitations of her status and live a more privileged life. She harbors a grudge against her mother who abandoned to her when she was young and has deep wounds from her father who was falsely accused of murder and she was labelled as the daughter of a murderer after that. Her life is getting harder as she's a talented designer but gets rejected by many companies due to her status. Her name is initially Cha Su-ah.

- Lee Il-hwa as Han Hye-ra / Han Young-sun

The vice president of Kunhyang Group, she is Jung-won's biological mother and also mother-in-law, and Se-hoon's stepmother. To escape the stigma of being called a "murderer's wife", she abandoned her daughter Su-ah and married Tae-seok, Kunhyang Group's chairman. She had tries to find her daughter Su-ah for many years, to make it up to her, but she accidentally broke that promise due to a car accident before. But as she discovering her daughter-in-law Young-chae, who she always raged on, is her abandoned daughter, her world is falling apart.

- Seol Jung-hwan as Joo Ha-neul

Young-chae's older brother and Jung-won's assistant. He's a strategic and patient man who wants to uncover the truth about his father's death. Despite that, he's a romantic who'll do anything for love. He falls for Jung-won, since their high school days, although he knows she's pretending to be Young-chae.

- Han Ki-woong as Jin Se-hoon

Hye-ra's stepson and Kunhyang heir, engaged to fake Joo Young-chae.

- Lee Hyo-na as Joo Young-chae

A rich daughter, who is a rival to Jung-won.

=== Supporting ===
- Lee Seung-yeon as Gong Nan-sook

Young-chae's mother and Ha-neul's stepmother.

- Choi Jong-hwan as Jin Tae-seok

The chairman of Kunhyang Group. He is Se-hoon and Se-mi's father and Hye-ra's second husband.

- Park Chul-ho as Cha Ki-beom

Jung-won's father who was falsely accused of murder. He is Hye-ra's ex-husband.

- Yoon Ji-sook as Jo Mi-hyang

Jung-won's aunt who becomes her mother.

- Choi Da-neum as Jin Se-mi
- Gong Da-im as Ahn Ji-na

=== Others ===
- Kim Hee-chan as Noh Min-goo

Jung-won's ex-boyfriend.

- Kim Hyun-jae as Park Kyung-shin

Young-chae's lover.

== Production and release ==
Writer Lee Do-hyun, known for her works such as The Witch's Game (2022–2023), Secrets and Lies (2018–2019), and Family Secret (2014–2015), wrote the screenplay, and director Son Seok-jin helmed the series. The production is handled by Neo Entertainment and Studio Bom.

In July 2025, SPOTV reported that Lee Si-a, Seol Jung-hwan, Han Ki-woong, and Lee Hyo-na are set to star, and the series was scheduled to air in September 2025. The next month, both actors — including Lee Il-hwa and Lee Seung-yeon — were officially confirmed to appear. By September 2025, a teaser poster was released, confirming the series would air on KBS2 on September 22, and would air every Monday to Friday at 19:50 (KST).

== Viewership ==
A Graceful Liar : South Korea viewers per episode (millions)

Episodes	Episode number																									
Episodes	1	2	3	4	5	6	7	8	9	10	11	12	13	14	15	16	17	18	19	20	21	22	23	24	25	26
1–25	1.363	1.577	1.599	1.396	1.446	1.485	1.568	1.673	1.473	1.603	1.683	1.344	1.482	1.420	1.801	1.450	1.500	1.489	1.502	1.276	1.438	1.321	1.436	1.312	1.304	–
26–50	1.428	1.523	1.432	1.441	1.449	1.513	1.547	1.490	1.529	1.358	1.524	1.605	1.408	1.449	1.545	1.468	1.684	1.620	1.629	1.545	1.596	1.723	1.593	1.447	1.663	–
51–75	1.662	1.681	1.738	1.764	1.618	1.628	1.744	1.599	1.547	1.593	1.647	1.514	1.722	1.752	1.628	1.594	1.856	1.852	1.652	1.669	1.723	1.764	1.740	1.690	1.629	–
76–101	1.662	1.639	1.752	1.643	1.800	1.755	1.701	1.653	1.766	1.815	1.688	1.655	1.765	1.957	1.939	1.815	1.889	1.822	1.721	1.731	1.828	1.825	1.942	1.959	1.808	1.939

Source: Audience measurement performed nationwide by Nielsen Korea.

Average TV viewership ratings
Ep.	Original broadcast date	Average audience share	
Ep.	Original broadcast date	Nielsen Korea	
Ep.	Original broadcast date	Nationwide	Seoul
1	September 22, 2025	7.9% (2nd)	6.6% (2nd)
2	September 23, 2025	8.8% (2nd)	7.4% (2nd)
3	September 24, 2025	9.0% (2nd)	7.8% (2nd)
4	September 25, 2025	7.9% (2nd)	7.1% (2nd)
5	September 26, 2025	8.0% (2nd)	7.2% (2nd)
6	September 29, 2025	8.3% (2nd)	7.1% (2nd)
7	September 30, 2025	8.6% (2nd)	7.3% (2nd)
8	October 1, 2025	9.2% (2nd)	8.0% (2nd)
9	October 2, 2025	8.4% (2nd)	6.8% (2nd)
10	October 3, 2025	8.6% (2nd)	7.2% (2nd)
11	October 9, 2025	9.0% (1st)	7.5% (2nd)
12	October 10, 2025	7.2% (1st)	6.3% (2nd)
13	October 13, 2025	8.0% (2nd)	7.4% (3rd)
14	October 14, 2025	8.1% (2nd)	6.7% (2nd)
15	October 15, 2025	8.1% (2nd)	6.2% (4th)
16	October 16, 2025	7.8% (2nd)	6.2% (3rd)
17	October 17, 2025	8.2% (2nd}	6.5% (3rd)
18	October 20, 2025	8.3% (2nd)	7.1% (2nd)
19	October 22, 2025	8.5% (3rd)	7.4% (2nd)
20	October 23, 2025	7.2% (2nd)	5.9% (3rd)
21	October 24, 2025	8.1% (3rd)	6.9% (4th)
22	October 27, 2025	7.5% (3rd)	6.1% (4th)
23	October 28, 2025	8.3% (2nd)	6.6% (3rd)
24	October 29, 2025	7.3% (3rd)	5.9% (4th)
25	October 31, 2025	7.4% (3rd)	6.0% (6th)
26	November 3, 2025	8.4% (2nd)	6.9% (2nd)
27	November 4, 2025	8.3% (2nd)	7.2% (2nd)
28	November 5, 2025	8.2% (2nd)	6.5% (3rd)
29	November 6, 2025	8.1% (2nd)	7.4% (2nd)
30	November 7, 2025	8.1% (1st)	7.1% (3rd)
31	November 10, 2025	8.7% (2nd)	7.5% (2nd)
32	November 11, 2025	8.8% (2nd)	7.4% (2nd)
33	November 12, 2025	8.4% (2nd)	7.1% (2nd)
34	November 13, 2025	8.5% (2nd)	7.1% (2nd)
35	November 14, 2025	7.5% (3rd)	6.3% (3rd)
36	November 17, 2025	8.6% (2nd)	7.3% (2nd)
37	November 18, 2025	9.0% (1st)	7.2% (2nd)
38	November 19, 2025	8.2% (2nd)	6.7% (2nd)
39	November 20, 2025	8.2% (2nd)	6.5% (2nd)
40	November 21, 2025	8.6% (2nd)	7.0% (3rd)
41	November 24, 2025	8.3% (2nd)	6.3% (3rd)
42	November 25, 2025	9.4% (2nd)	7.7% (1st)
43	November 26, 2025	8.8% (2nd)	7.4% (2nd)
44	November 27, 2025	9.3% (2nd)	8.0% (1st)
45	November 28, 2025	8.4% (3rd)	6.9% (3rd)
46	December 1, 2025	9.0% (2nd)	7.3% (2nd)
47	December 2, 2025	9.9% (1st)	8.5% (1st)
48	December 3, 2025	9.0% (2nd)	7.4% (2nd)
49	December 4, 2025	8.3% (2nd)	7.1% (2nd)
50	December 5, 2025	9.3% (1st)	7.6% (2nd)
51	December 8, 2025	9.3% (2nd)	7.7% (2nd)
52	December 9, 2025	9.4% (1st)	7.3% (2nd)
53	December 10, 2025	9.6% (2nd)	8.1% (1st)
54	December 11, 2025	9.5% (2nd)	7.8% (2nd)
55	December 12, 2025	9.1% (3rd)	7.3% (3rd)
56	December 15, 2025	9.1% (2nd)	7.8% (2nd)
57	December 16, 2025	9.8% (2nd)	8.5% (2nd)
58	December 17, 2025	9.1% (2nd)	8.0% (1st)
59	December 18, 2025	8.7% (2nd)	7.6% (2nd)
60	December 22, 2025	9.0% (2nd)	7.5% (2nd)
61	December 23, 2025	9.1% (2nd)	7.6% (2nd)
62	December 24, 2025	8.4% (2nd)	7.4% (2nd)
63	December 25, 2025	9.2% (2nd)	8.3% (2nd)
64	December 26, 2025	9.9% (3rd)	8.7% (3rd)
65	December 29, 2025	8.9% (2nd)	7.4% (2nd)
66	December 30, 2025	9.4% (2nd)	7.9% (2nd)
67	January 1, 2026	9.9% (2nd)	8.3% (2nd)
68	January 2, 2026	10.0% (3rd)	8.4% (3rd)
69	January 5, 2026	9.5% (2nd)	7.9% (2nd)
70	January 6, 2026	9.6% (2nd)	7.7% (2nd)
71	January 7, 2026	9.6% (2nd)	7.7% (2nd)
72	January 8, 2026	9.8% (2nd)	7.8% (2nd)
73	January 9, 2026	9.8% (3rd)	7.9% (3rd)
74	January 12, 2026	9.7% (2nd)	8.2% (2nd)
75	January 13, 2026	8.9% (2nd)	7.3% (2nd)
76	January 14, 2026	9.1% (2nd)	7.5% (2nd)
77	January 15, 2026	9.4% (2nd)	7.8% (2nd)
78	January 16, 2026	9.8% (2nd)	7.8% (3rd)
79	January 19, 2026	9.3% (2nd)	8.2% (2nd)
80	January 20, 2026	10.2% (2nd)	8.6% (2nd)
81	January 21, 2026	10.0% (2nd)	8.3% (2nd)
82	January 22, 2026	9.3% (2nd)	7.5% (2nd)
83	January 23, 2026	9.4% (3rd)	7.6% (3rd)
84	January 26, 2026	9.8% (2nd)	7.9% (2nd)
85	January 27, 2026	9.9% (2nd)	7.6% (2nd)
86	January 28, 2026	9.8% (2nd)	7.7% (2nd)
87	January 29, 2026	9.6% (2nd)	8.0% (2nd)
88	January 30, 2026	9.6% (3rd)	8.3% (3rd)
89	February 2, 2026	10.2% (2nd)	8.8% (2nd)
90	February 3, 2026	10.4% (2nd)	8.6% (2nd)
91	February 4, 2026	9.9% (2nd)	8.4% (2nd)
92	February 5, 2026	10.7% (2nd)	9.2% (2nd)
93	February 6, 2026	9.9% (3rd)	8.3% (3rd)
94	February 9, 2026	9.7% (2nd)	8.3% (2nd)
95	February 10, 2026	9.5% (2nd)	7.7% (2nd)
96	February 11, 2026	10.2% (2nd)	8.6% (2nd)
97	February 12, 2026	9.8% (2nd)	8.5% (2nd)
98	February 13, 2026	10.2% (3rd)	8.8% (3rd)
99	February 18, 2026	10.5% (2nd)	8.8% (2nd)
100	February 19, 2026	9.8% (2nd)	8.2% (3rd)
101	February 20, 2026	10.5% (2nd)	8.7% (2nd)
Average		9.0%	7.5%
In the table above, the blue numbers represent the lowest ratings and the red numbers represent the highest ratings.
