= Seo Eun-ah =

South Korean actress (born 1989)

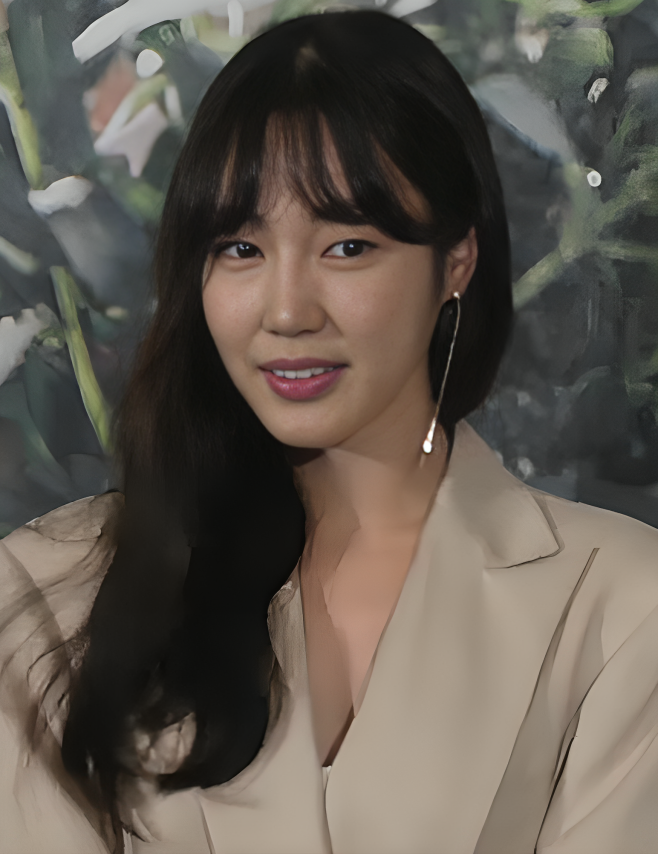
- Seo in July 2018
- Born: February 26, 1989 (age 37); Incheon, South Korea
- Education: Korea National University of Arts
- Occupation: Actress
- Years active: 2005–present
- Agent: A-road Entertainment

Korean name
- Hangul: 서은아
- RR: Seo Euna
- MR: Sŏ Ŭna

Seo Eun-ah (Korean: 서은아; born February 26, 1989) is a South Korean actress. She graduated from the Korea National University of Arts School of Drama with a major in Acting and a minor in Dance, and began her entertainment career in 2005 by appearing in Dove commercials. In 2013, Seo beat 200 hopefuls when she auditioned three times for the leading role as a student who has an affair with her professor's husband in the film Act, for which she won the Grand Bell Award for Best New Actress.

== Filmography ==
=== Film ===
Year	Title	Role	Notes/Ref.
2008	Good Yeon-Ha	Soo-jin's friend	short film
2008	Dance of a Free Bird	Girl on blind date	short film
2010	With My Lover on Weekend	Yoon-ji	short film
2012	U.F.O.	Lee Ji-hyun	
2012	Spooky Story	Son Joo-young	short film
2012	Fighting Family	Home Shopping production assistant	short film
2013	Act	Ha Yeon-ni	
2014	The Youth	Go-eun (segment "Play Girl")	
2015	Heuksan Island	Seol-ran	
2016	Missing	Soo-ryun	
2017	Roman Holiday	Ae-ri	
2019	Fist and Furious	Choi Sul-Ran	

=== Television series ===
Year	Title	Role	Network
2013	My Cute Guys	Eun-ah	tvN
2015	The Missing	Eun Chae-rin (ep.3-4)	OCN
2015	Hidden Identity	(ep.13)	tvN
2015	KBS Drama Special: "Secret"	Nguyen Thuy Tien	KBS2
2016	Signal	Yoo Seung-yeon (ep.10-11)	tvN
2017	Tunnel	Kim Mi-soo (ep.6)	OCN
2017	My Sassy Girl	Mal-geum	SBS
2018	Your House Helper	Han So-mi	KBS2
2018	The Sound of Your Heart: Reboot	Tae Hee	KBS2; Netflix
2018	The Sound of Your Heart: Reboot 2	Tae Hee	KBS2; Netflix
2019	Arthdal Chronicles	Ah Sa Mot	tvN
2020	Soul Mechanic	Na Seong-gyeong (Ep. 21-24)	KBS2
2023	Queenmaker	Seon-young	Netflix

=== Music video ===
Year	Song title	Artist
2013	"Difficult Woman"	Jang Bum-Joon

== Theater ==
Year	Title	Role
2010	Victory in Music	Mom Eun-Ah

== Awards and nominations ==
Year	Award	Category	Nominated work	Result
2013	50th Grand Bell Awards	Best New Actress	Act	Won
