= Cha Min-ji =

South Korean actress (born 1990)

- Born: Kim Min-ji; 29 April 1990 (age 36); Seoul, South Korea
- Occupation: Actress
- Years active: 2005–present
- Agent: Mystic Actors
- Known for: Queen of Mystery; How to Be Thirty; Oh My Ladylord

Cha Min-ji (Korean: 차민지; born 29 April 1990) is a South Korean actress. She is known for her roles in dramas such as Queen of Mystery, How to Be Thirty and Oh My Ladylord. She also appeared in movies The Cat Funeral, Welcome and Unalterable.

== Filmography ==
=== Television series ===
Year	Title	Role	Notes/Ref.
2008	Jungle Fish	Kang-sol	
2008	The Great King, Sejong	Dam-i	
2010	KBS Drama Special: "The Secret Garden"	Kim Gi-rim	
2011	The Princess' Man	Yeo-ri	
2012	KBS Drama Special: "The Whereabouts of Noh Sukja"	Jang-mi	
2012	Syndrome	Min-jee	
2012	I Need a Fairy	Lee Ha-ni	
2012	Seoyoung, My Daughter	Ha-young	
2013	The Eldest	Eun-joo	
2016	Still Loving You	Chae-won	
2017	Queen of Mystery	Ko Joo-yeon	
2017	Go Back	Ma Eun-ji	
2018	Drama Stage: "Fighter Choi Kang Soon"	Kwon Ji-young	
2018	Voice	Go Ye-ji	
2018	Priest	Jang Kyung-ran	
2019	Bad Love	Choi Eun-hye	
2020	Born Again	Jay	
2021	How to Be Thirty	Hong Ah-young	
2021	Oh My Ladylord	Choi In-young	
2022	Bravo, My Life	Baek Seung-joo	
2023	The Real Has Come!	Jin Soo-ji	Special appearance
2025	Queen's House	Do Yu-kyung	

=== Film ===
Year	Title	Role	Ref.
2008	Forever the Moment	Jang Bo-ram	
2014	Welcome	Yeon-joo	
2014	Zombie School	Jung-ja	
2015	The Cat Funeral	Eun-kyung	
2015	Twenty	20 year old woman	
2018	Unalterable	Young-jae's sister	
2020	Unalterable: The Untold Story - Director's Cut	Young-jae's sister	

== Theater ==
Year	English title	Korean title	Role	Ref.
2021	Two Suns	두 개의 태양	Sadako	

== Ambassadorship ==
- 6th Handball Ambassador in 2007

== Awards and nominations ==
Name of the award ceremony, year presented, category, nominee of the award, and the result of the nomination
Award ceremony	Year	Category	Nominee / Work	Result	Ref.
KBS Drama Awards	2022	Excellence Award, Actress in a Daily Drama	Bravo, My Life	Nominated	
Korea Youth Film Festival	2006	Best Actress	For Alice	Won	
