= Kang Da-bin =

South Korean actor (born 1992)

- Born: 14 February 1992 (age 34); South Korea
- Education: Seokyeong University
- Occupation: Actor
- Years active: 2013–present
- Known for: Blade Man; Dal Soon's Spring

Kang Da-bin (Korean: 강다빈; born February 14, 1992) is a South Korean actor. He is best known for Blade Man (2014) and Dal Soon's Spring (2017–2018).

== Filmography ==
=== Television series ===
Year	Title	Role	Ref.
2013	Love in Her Bag	Park Jong-min	
2014	Blade Man	Soo Jae	
2017	My Father Is Strange	Jin Sung-joon	
2017–2018	Dal Soon's Spring	Suh Hyun-do	
2023–2024	Unpredictable Family	Yoo Eun-hyuk	
