= Unpredictable Family =

2023–2024 South Korean television series

- Promotional poster
- Also known as: Bumpy Family; Tumbling Family; Udangtangtang Family
- Hangul: 우당탕탕 패밀리
- Lit.: Udangtangtang Family
- RR: Udangtangtang paemilli
- MR: Udangt'angt'ang p'aemilli
- Genre: Drama; Romantic comedy; Family
- Created by: Park Ki-ho; KBS Drama Division
- Written by: Moon Young-hoon
- Directed by: Kim Sung-geun
- Starring: Nam Sang-ji; Lee Do-gyeom; Kang Da-bin; Lee Hyo-na
- Music by: Lee Chang-hee
- Country of origin: South Korea
- Original language: Korean
- No. of episodes: 131

Production
- Executive producer: Lee Jeong-mi (KBS)
- Producers: Kim Young-jun; Woo Yes-ran; Kim Hyung-jun; Shin Dong-cheol
- Camera setup: Single-camera
- Running time: 30 minutes
- Production companies: Monster Union; Ascendio Entertainment

Original release
- Network: KBS1
- Release: September 18, 2023 – March 22, 2024

Unpredictable Family (Korean: 우당탕탕 패밀리) is a South Korean television series starring Nam Sang-ji, Lee Do-gyeom, Kang Da-bin and Lee Hyo-na. It premiered on KBS1 on September 18, 2023, and aired on every weekday at 20:30 (KST) for 131 episodes.

== Synopsis ==
A love story between an aspiring actor and a promising director, whose parents are a married couple who have been married for 30 years. Can they overcome such a complicated family relationship and become a real family?

== Cast and characters ==
=== Main ===
- Nam Sang-ji as Yoo Eun-seong (age 28) – Dong-gu and Chun-young's daughter, Eun-hyuk and Eun-ah's stepsister, an unknown actress who dreams of a brilliant rise, but is at the bottom in reality. Former Blue Film employee. Si-heon's former lover.
- Lee Do-gyeom as Kang Seon-woo (age 34) – Jeong-ae and Ki-seok's son. A promising Hollywood film director who must achieve what he sets out to achieve. Seon-ju's older brother. Eun-ah and Eun-hyuk's half-brother.
- Kang Da-bin as Yoo Eun-hyuk (age 35) – Eun-seong's older brother and Eun-ah's younger brother. Dong-gu's son and Chun-young's adopted son. Jeong-ae's biological son. A violent crime detective who calls himself the grim reaper of criminals. Sun-woo's half-brother. Seon-ju's half-brother. Ha-young's lover.
- Lee Hyo-na as Shin Ha-yeong (age 30) – Dal-yong's daughter, a film company planning producer who transforms into a colorful character to get what she wants. Eun-seong's boss at work. Blue Film team leader. Min-guk's aunt. Ga-ram's great-aunt. Eun-hyuk's lover.

=== Supporting ===
==== Eun-seong's family ====
- Lee Jong-won as Yoo Dong-gu (age 60) – father of three siblings, ex-husband of Jeong-ae. Chun-young's current husband. The eternally sad irregular worker at the local restaurant 'Haha Chicken'. Jeong-suk's former brother-in-law.
- Kim Seon-kyung as Go Chun-young (age 57, pseudonym: Yoon Ji-sook/Mari) – Dong-gu's current wife, Eun-ah & Eun-hyuk's adoptive mother, and Eun-seong's mother.
- Joo Sae-byeok as Yoo Eun-ah (age 37, pseudonym: Yoo Sara) – Eun-hyuk's older sister, Eun-seong's older step-sister. A show host obsessed with youth, beauty, and diet. She is Dong-gu's daughter and Chun-young's adoptive daughter. She is Jeong-ae's biological daughter. Seon-ju's stepsister. Seon-woo's half-sister. Min-guk's friend. She likes Min-guk.

==== Sun-woo's family ====
- Lee Dae-yeon as Kang Ki-seok (age 59) – Seon-woo and Seon-joo's father, Jeong-ae's current husband. The head of the household is quite authoritative, but doesn't get anything his way. Jeong-suk's brother-in-law.
- Choi Su-rin as Shim Jeong-ae (age 59, pseudonym: Shim Mi-jin/Sophie) – Seon-woo and Seon-ju's mother, Dong-gu's ex-wife. Ki-seok's current wife. She is Eun-ah and Eun-hyuk's biological mother.
- Ahn Yeon-hong as Shim Jeong-sook (age 49) – Seon-woo and Seon-ju's aunt and Jeong-ae's younger sister. He is an eternal child who cannot come to his senses even after causing an accident because of her love. She is Ki-seok's sister-in-law. She is Dong-gu's former sister-in-law. She is Eun-ah and Eun-hyuk's aunt. Seon-woo and Seon-ju's aunt.
- Lim Na-young as Kang Seon-ju (age 28) – Seon-woo's younger sister and Eun-seong's friend. She is the daughter of Ki-seok and Jeong-ae. She is an aspiring drama writer who lightly ignores the world's standards. Jeong-suk's nephew. Eun-ah and Eun-hyuk's half-sister. She is a part-time worker at Min-guk's cafe. She likes Min-guk.

==== Ha-young's family ====
- Im Ha-ryong as Shin Dal-yong (age 80) – The deceased father of Ha-seong and Ha-young, an indomitable romantic who lives and dies in love. Jin-sil's father-in-law. Min-guk's paternal grandfather. The great-grandfather of Ga-ram.
- Kim Bo-mi as Maeng Jin-sil (age 58) – Ha-yeong's sister-in-law and Dal-yong's daughter-in-law. She is a kind but fierce daughter-in-law who says everything she wants to say. She is the deceased wife of Ha-seong. She is Min-guk's mother. Ga-ram's paternal grandmother. The cafe's legal owner.
- Choi Woo-hyuk as Shin Min-guk (age 34) – Ha-yeong's nephew, Jin-jin's son. Ga-ram's father. A happy father raising a cuckoo chick. Cafe owner.
- Jeong Min-jun as Shin Ga-ram (age 6) – Min-guk's son, a kindergarten student who speaks English well. Jin-sil's grandson. Dal-yong's great-grandson. Ha-young's grandnephew. Hye-yoon's biological son.
- Yang Ji-won as Jeong Hye-yoon – Ga-ram's biological mother.

==== People around Eun-seong ====
- Lee Jung-hyuk as Yeon Je-ha

== Original soundtrack ==
- Part 1: Ahn Ye-seul - To My Boyfriend (Released on September 25, 2023)
- Part 2: Mini Mani - Even If You Forget Me (Released on October 2, 2023)
- Part 3: Lydia - Isn't That What Living Is All About? (Released on October 9, 2023)
- Part 4: Taehwa Yoon - As If Dreaming (Released on October 16, 2023)
- Part 5: Jo Joon-jo - Romantic Tango (Released on October 23, 2023)
- Part 6: Yeo-eun - There's Still Something I Want To Say To You (Released on October 30, 2023)
- Part 7: Bagna - In The End, I Am The Same (Released on November 2, 2023)
- Part 8: Yellow - I Love You More Than Anyone Else (Released on November 6, 2023)
- Part 9: Coda Bridge - There Are A Lot Of Things I Want To Do With You (Released on November 13, 2023)
- Part 10: Morning Coffee - Does There Have To Be A Reason To Love (Released on November 20, 2023)
- Part 11: Han Kyung-il - Some Days (Released on November 27, 2023)
- Part 12: Uhana - If I Really Loved You (Released on December 4, 2023)
- Part 13: Damu - I Loved You So Much (Released on December 11, 2023)
- Part 14: The Daisy - I Was Never Okay (Released on December 18, 2023)
- Part 15: Bernard Park - Aroha (Released on December 25, 2023)
- Part 16: Doha (XEED) - I Remember You To Forget (Released on January 1, 2024)
- Part 17: Naeunseol - To Me Who Was Loved (Released on January 8, 2024)
- Part 18: Joo Won-tak - Just Like That, The Day Goes By (Released on January 15, 2024)
- Part 19: Lee Hyeon - Walk In The Opposite Direction (Released on January 22, 2024)
- Part 20: Ha Jin-woo - An Uneventful Day (Released on February 5, 2024)

== Viewership ==
Unpredictable Family : South Korea viewers per episode (millions)

Episodes	Episode number																					
Episodes	1	2	3	4	5	6	7	8	9	10	11	12	13	14	15	16	17	18	19	20	21	22
1–22	2.183	1.421	1.966	1.571	1.832	1.737	1.322	1.144	1.182	1.072	1.295	1.146	1.932	1.768	1.695	1.754	1.483	1.818	1.471	1.717	1.948	1.677
23–44	1.869	1.747	1.646	1.894	1.643	1.776	1.572	1.753	1.823	1.750	2.031	1.695	1.689	1.793	1.561	1.785	1.757	1.790	1.853	1.625	1.917	1.827
45–66	1.896	1.935	1.675	1.924	1.933	1.927	1.938	2.053	2.043	1.850	1.856	1.984	1.869	2.019	1.910	N/A	N/A	1.997	N/A	N/A	N/A	2.159
67–88	N/A	N/A	N/A	N/A	2.100	1.945	2.428	2.389	2.324	2.255	2.117	2.277	2.193	2.176	2.173	1.934	1.986	2.129	2.221	2.293	2.186	2.091
89–110	2.231	1.823	1.938	2.020	2.113	2.070	2.246	1.983	2.083	1.978	2.044	1.980	1.652	1.732	2.127	2.168	2.125	1.980	2.054	2.016	2.198	2.049
111–131	1.823	2.092	2.080	2.078	2.127	2.025	2.115	2.133	2.198	2.205	1.971	2.152	2.212	2.058	2.046	2.002	2.093	2.054	2.172	1.984	2.012	–

Source: Audience measurement performed nationwide by Nielsen Korea.

Average TV viewership ratings
Ep.	Original broadcast date	Average audience share (Nielsen Korea)	
Ep.	Original broadcast date	Nationwide	Seoul
1	September 18, 2023	13.0% (1st)	10.8% (1st)
2	September 19, 2023	8.5% (1st)	7.4% (1st)
3	September 20, 2023	11.6% (1st)	9.9% (1st)
4	September 21, 2023	9.2% (1st)	7.4% (1st)
5	September 22, 2023	10.5% (1st)	8.7% (1st)
6	September 25, 2023	10.5% (1st)	9.0% (1st)
7	September 26, 2023	8.5% (2nd)	7.6% (2nd)
8	October 2, 2023	6.5% (3rd)	5.5% (3rd)
9	October 3, 2023	6.5% (5th)	5.5% (4th)
10	October 4, 2023	6.6% (6th)	5.4% (6th)
11	October 5, 2023	8.0% (1st)	6.7% (1st)
12	October 6, 2023	6.8% (3rd)	5.5% (4th)
13	October 9, 2023	11.5% (1st)	9.6% (1st)
14	October 10, 2023	10.2% (1st)	8.8% (1st)
15	October 11, 2023	10.5% (1st)	9.4% (2nd)
16	October 12, 2023	10.8% (1st)	9.3% (1st)
17	October 13, 2023	9.6% (1st)	8.0% (1st)
18	October 16, 2023	11.1% (1st)	9.4% (1st)
19	October 17, 2023	9.6% (1st)	7.9% (1st)
20	October 18, 2023	10.1% (1st)	8.3% (1st)
21	October 19, 2023	11.7% (1st)	10.3% (1st)
22	October 20, 2023	10.2% (1st)	8.6% (2nd)
23	October 23, 2023	11.0% (1st)	9.0% (1st)
24	October 24, 2023	10.7% (1st)	9.4% (1st)
25	October 25, 2023	10.3% (1st)	9.2% (1st)
26	October 26, 2023	11.5% (1st)	10.0% (1st)
27	October 27, 2023	9.8% (2nd)	8.2% (3rd)
28	October 30, 2023	10.7% (1st)	9.3% (1st)
29	October 31, 2023	9.3% (1st)	8.3% (1st)
30	November 1, 2023	10.9% (1st)	10.0% (1st)
31	November 2, 2023	10.7% (1st)	9.1% (1st)
32	November 3, 2023	10.4% (1st)	8.8% (1st)
33	November 6, 2023	11.6% (1st)	10.1% (1st)
34	November 7, 2023	10.0% (1st)	8.8% (1st)
35	November 8, 2023	10.1% (1st)	8.7% (1st)
36	November 9, 2023	10.8% (1st)	9.7% (1st)
37	November 10, 2023	8.8% (2nd)	7.4% (4th)
38	November 13, 2023	10.8% (1st)	9.1% (1st)
39	November 14, 2023	10.7% (1st)	9.1% (1st)
40	November 15, 2023	11.3% (1st)	10.1% (1st)
41	November 16, 2023	11.2% (1st)	9.7% (1st)
42	November 17, 2023	10.5% (2nd)	8.8% (2nd)
43	November 20, 2023	11.1% (1st)	9.6% (1st)
44	November 21, 2023	10.2% (3rd)	8.7% (3rd)
45	November 22, 2023	11.1% (1st)	9.7% (1st)
46	November 23, 2023	11.1% (1st)	9.4% (1st)
47	November 24, 2023	10.3% (1st)	8.7% (1st)
48	November 27, 2023	11.1% (1st)	9.5% (1st)
49	November 28, 2023	11.7% (1st)	10.5% (1st)
50	November 29, 2023	11.4% (1st)	10.1% (1st)
51	November 30, 2023	11.3% (1st)	9.4% (1st)
52	December 1, 2023	11.8% (1st)	10.6% (1st)
53	December 4, 2023	11.8% (1st)	10.1% (1st)
54	December 5, 2023	10.9% (1st)	9.1% (1st)
55	December 6, 2023	10.9% (1st)	9.9% (1st)
56	December 7, 2023	12.1% (1st)	10.9% (1st)
57	December 8, 2023	10.7% (1st)	8.9% (1st)
58	December 11, 2023	11.8% (1st)	10.2% (1st)
59	December 12, 2023	11.5% (1st)	9.4% (1st)
60	December 13, 2023	11.7% (1st)	10.1% (1st)
61	December 14, 2023	13.2% (1st)	12.2% (1st)
62	December 15, 2023	12.0% (1st)	10.6% (1st)
63	December 18, 2023	11.9% (1st)	N/A
64	December 19, 2023	13.6% (1st)	11.8% (1st)
65	December 20, 2023	12.5% (1st)	13.0% (1st)
66	December 21, 2023	12.8% (1st)	10.8% (1st)
67	December 22, 2023	11.4% (1st)	N/A
68	December 25, 2023	13.7% (1st)	N/A
69	December 26, 2023	12.0% (1st)	N/A
70	December 27, 2023	12.0% (1st)	N/A
71	December 28, 2023	12.9% (1st)	11.0% (1st)
72	December 29, 2023	12.0% (1st)	10.1% (1st)
73	January 1, 2024	13.2% (1st)	11.5% (1st)
74	January 2, 2024	13.5% (1st)	11.7% (1st)
75	January 3, 2024	13.4% (1st)	11.6% (1st)
76	January 4, 2024	12.9% (1st)	11.1% (1st)
77	January 5, 2024	12.0% (1st)	10.3% (1st)
78	January 8, 2024	13.1% (1st)	11.5% (1st)
79	January 9, 2024	12.6% (1st)	10.7% (1st)
80	January 10, 2024	12.5% (1st)	10.7% (1st)
81	January 11, 2024	13.0% (1st)	11.3% (1st)
82	January 12, 2024	11.4% (1st)	9.8% (1st)
83	January 15, 2024	11.6% (1st)	10.3% (1st)
84	January 16, 2024	12.5% (1st)	10.9% (1st)
85	January 17, 2024	12.3% (1st)	11.0% (2nd)
86	January 18, 2024	13.1% (1st)	11.4% (1st)
87	January 22, 2024	12.4% (1st)	11.2% (1st)
88	January 23, 2024	12.2% (1st)	10.4% (1st)
89	January 24, 2024	12.2% (1st)	10.9% (1st)
90	January 25, 2024	11.2% (1st)	10.1% (1st)
91	January 26, 2024	11.5% (1st)	9.9% (2nd)
92	January 29, 2024	11.8% (1st)	9.9% (1st)
93	January 30, 2024	12.0% (1st)	10.2% (1st)
94	January 31, 2024	12.2% (1st)	11.0% (1st)
95	February 1, 2024	12.7% (1st)	11.3% (1st)
96	February 2, 2024	11.9% (2nd)	10.2% (2nd)
97	February 5, 2024	12.5% (1st)	10.4% (1st)
98	February 6, 2024	11.7% (1st)	9.7% (1st)
99	February 7, 2024	12.2% (1st)	10.7% (1st)
100	February 8, 2024	11.4% (1st)	9.7% (1st)
101	February 9, 2024	8.9% (2nd)	7.8% (2nd)
102	February 12, 2024	9.8% (2nd)	8.4% (2nd)
103	February 13, 2024	11.9% (1st)	10.3% (1st)
104	February 14, 2024	12.6% (1st)	10.7% (1st)
105	February 15, 2024	12.5% (1st)	10.5% (1st)
106	February 16, 2024	11.5% (2nd)	10.0% (2nd)
107	February 19, 2024	11.9% (1st)	10.3% (1st)
108	February 20, 2024	11.6% (1st)	10.0% (1st)
109	February 21, 2024	12.3% (1st)	11.1% (1st)
110	February 22, 2024	11.6% (1st)	9.1% (1st)
111	February 23, 2024	10.6% (1st)	9.1% (2nd)
112	February 26, 2024	12.4% (1st)	10.5% (1st)
113	February 27, 2024	11.9% (1st)	9.7% (1st)
114	February 28, 2024	12.1% (1st)	10.2% (1st)
115	February 29, 2024	12.4% (1st)	10.5% (1st)
116	March 1, 2024	11.2% (1st)	9.2% (2nd)
117	March 4, 2024	12.7% (1st)	10.7% (1st)
118	March 5, 2024	12.4% (1st)	10.3% (1st)
119	March 6, 2024	13.3% (1st)	11.9% (1st)
120	March 7, 2024	12.6% (1st)	10.6% (1st)
121	March 8, 2024	11.7% (1st)	9.9% (1st)
122	March 11, 2024	12.8% (1st)	10.8% (1st)
123	March 12, 2024	12.8% (1st)	11.1% (1st)
124	March 13, 2024	12.2% (1st)	10.7% (1st)
125	March 14, 2024	12.0% (1st)	10.1% (1st)
126	March 15, 2024	11.7% (1st)	9.7% (2nd)
127	March 18, 2024	12.5% (1st)	10.8% (1st)
128	March 19, 2024	12.1% (1st)	10.5% (1st)
129	March 20, 2024	12.5% (1st)	10.7% (1st)
130	March 21, 2024	12.0% (1st)	10.4% (1st)
131	March 22, 2024	11.7% (1st)	9.7% (2nd)
Average		11.4%	— (Note: Due to multiple unpublished ratings, the exact average rating is unknown.)
In the table above, the blue numbers represent the lowest ratings and the red numbers represent the highest ratings.; N/A denotes ratings that were not published.
