= Gold Mask =

2022 South Korean television series

- Promotional poster
- Hangul: 황금 가면
- Hanja: 黃金 假面
- Lit.: Golden Mask
- RR: Hwanggeum gamyeon
- MR: Hwanggŭm kamyŏn
- Genre: Melodrama; Revenge; Family
- Created by: KBS Drama Division
- Written by: Kim Min-joo
- Directed by: Eo Soo-sun
- Music by: Baek Eun-woo
- Country of origin: South Korea
- Original language: Korean
- No. of episodes: 100

Production
- Executive producer: Hong Seok-gu (KBS)
- Producers: Kim Jong-sik; Kim Nam-hee
- Running time: 40 minutes
- Production company: IWill Media

Original release
- Network: KBS2
- Release: May 23 – October 7, 2022

Gold Mask (Korean: 황금 가면) is a South Korean television series starring Cha Ye-ryun, Na Young-hee and Lee Hwi-hyang. It is about a tragedy of three women, caused by greed and desire. The daily drama aired on KBS2 on May 23 to October 7, 2022, every weekday at 19:50 (KST) for 100 episodes.

== Synopsis ==
The drama tells the story of finding the answer to life in a mad fight between three women due to a tragedy caused by false desires and greed.

== Cast ==
=== Main ===
- Cha Ye-ryun as Yoo Soo-Yeon

Grew up with ordinary parents, she falls in love with a man from a chaebol family and marries him. Her life seems to mirror that of Cinderella and she is envied by others, but her life isn't easy due to mistreatment from her in-laws.

- Na Young-hee as Cha Hwa-Young

She is full of greed and desire, and tries to keep her upper class life.

- Lee Hwi-hyang as Go Mi-Sook

She is a private moneylender and she owns a franchise restaurant chain. She is a good person.

- Lee Joong-moon as Hong Jin-woo

He is the son of Cha Hwa-Young, he is tricked by his mother into divorcing Soo-Yeon and into marrying Yoo-ra.

- Lee Hyun-jin as Kang Dong-ha

He is a director of a private investment company, he wants to avenge his father's death.

- Yeon Min-ji as Seo Yoo-ra

An evil and cunning designer who will become Soo-Yeon's arch-nemesis. She killed Soo-Yeon's father and will kill anyone who dares to stop her wicked plans.

=== Supporting ===
- Sunwoo Eun-sook as Kim Hye-kyung

Yoo Su-yeon's mother.

- Jung Min-joon as Hong Seo-jun

Yoo Su-yeon's son to Jin-woo.

- Gong Da-im as Hong Jin-ah

An aristocrat who secretly has a crush on Kang Dong-ha, She is also Cha Hwa-yeong's arrogant and violent daughter.

- Lee Joo-eun as Noh Young-ji

The cousin of Yoo Su-yeon. After a divorce from a violent husband she began living with her aunt, Kim Hye Kyung.

- Hwang Dong-joo as Ko Dae-cheol

Restaurant manager, but he has a remarkable history as a special forces soldier.

- Kim Ji-yoon as Lee Ji-eun

The butler in charge of the housekeeping of the SA group.

== Production ==
The series is directed by Io Soo Sun, who has worked on series such as Angel's Revenge (2014) and Gracious Revenge (2019). It is written by Kim Min Joo, who wrote the series Sunny Again Tomorrow (2018) and I Wanna Hear Your Song (2019). It is planned by KBS Drama Department and produced by IWill Media.

== Original soundtrack ==
Part 1

Released on June 15, 2022
No.	Title	Lyrics	Music	Artist	Length
1.	"Confidently" (당당하게)	30Billion; Hwang Seung Min	30Billion; Hwang Seung-min; Kim Young-min	Hong Jin-young	4:15
2.	"Confidently" (당당하게; Inst.)		30Billion; Hwang Seung-min; Kim Young-min		4:15
Total length:					8:30

Part 2

Released on July 4, 2022
No.	Title	Lyrics	Music	Artist	Length
1.	"Always Love With You" (어느새 그대가)	Lee Ki-hwan	Soo Sang-han	Floody	3:24
2.	"Always Love With You" (어느새 그대가; Inst.)		Soo Sang-han		3:24
Total length:					6:48

Part 3

Released on July 24, 2022
No.	Title	Lyrics	Music	Artist	Length
1.	"Like Now" (이렇게 지금)	Baek Eun-woo	RUNY; Park Jeong-jun	RUNY	3:58
2.	"Like Now" (이렇게 지금; Inst.)		RUNY; Park Jeong-jun		3:58
Total length:					7:56

Part 4

Released on September 14, 2022
No.	Title	Lyrics	Music	Artist	Length
1.	"Only One" (오직 한사람)	Neighbor's Bachelor	Neighbor's Bachelor	FeelTong	4:25
2.	"Only One" (이오직 한사람; Inst.)		Neighbor's Bachelor		4:25
Total length:					8:50

Part 5

Released on October 1, 2022
No.	Title	Lyrics	Music	Artist	Length
1.	"I Can't Stop Crying" (눈물이 멈추질 않아)	Park Kyung-don	Park Kyung-don	Lee Sul	3:48
2.	"I Can't Stop Crying" (눈물이 멈추질 않아; Inst.)		Park Kyung-don		3:48
Total length:					7:36

== Viewership ==
Gold Mask : South Korea viewers per episode (millions)

Episodes	Episode number																			
Episodes	1	2	3	4	5	6	7	8	9	10	11	12	13	14	15	16	17	18	19	20
1–20	1.843	1.786	1.733	1.699	1.664	1.738	1.549	1.259	1.479	1.621	1.730	2.104	1.912	2.003	2.008	2.116	2.051	2.127	2.138	2.345
21–40	2.214	2.192	2.143	2.470	2.057	2.347	2.482	2.208	2.303	2.236	2.513	2.534	2.348	2.472	2.164	2.441	2.591	2.394	2.353	2.127
41–60	2.527	2.513	2.375	2.624	2.578	2.537	2.674	2.342	2.619	2.544	2.776	2.789	2.645	2.707	2.496	2.943	2.723	2.553	2.594	2.655
61–80	2.864	2.744	2.524	2.578	2.658	2.661	2.738	2.612	2.461	2.466	2.700	2.922	2.596	2.805	2.671	2.998	2.763	2.611	2.603	1.235
81–100	2.809	2.968	2.769	2.960	2.886	2.856	2.817	2.645	2.510	2.559	2.771	2.724	2.732	2.928	2.727	2.804	2.772	2.637	2.739	2.662

Source: Audience measurement performed nationwide by Nielsen Korea.

Average TV viewership ratings
Ep.	Broadcast date	Average audience share		
Ep.	Broadcast date	Nielsen Korea		TNmS
Ep.	Broadcast date	Nationwide	Seoul	Nationwide
1	May 23, 2022	11.5% (3rd)	10.0% (3rd)	11.1% (3rd)
2	May 24, 2022	11.3% (2nd)	9.7% (2nd)	11.7% (2nd)
3	May 25, 2022	10.4% (2nd)	9.2% (2nd)	12.0% (2nd)
4	May 26, 2022	10.1% (3rd)	8.5% (3rd)	10.9% (2nd)
5	May 27, 2022	10.4% (3rd)	8.8% (4th)	11.1% (2nd)
6	May 30, 2022	10.4% (3rd)	8.8% (3rd)	11.7% (2nd)
7	May 31, 2022	9.7% (3rd)	8.1% (3rd)	10.9% (2nd)
8	June 1, 2022	7.9% (4th)	7.0% (4th)	N/A
9	June 2, 2022	9.0% (3rd)	7.4% (5th)	9.9% (2nd)
10	June 3, 2022	9.8% (3rd)	8.2% (4th)	10.6% (2nd)
11	June 6, 2022	10.9% (2nd)	9.5% (2nd)	10.5% (2nd)
12	June 7, 2022	12.6% (2nd)	10.7% (2nd)	12.1% (2nd)
13	June 8, 2022	11.5% (3rd)	10.3% (3rd)	12.7% (2nd)
14	June 9, 2022	12.0% (2nd)	9.6% (3rd)	11.9% (2nd)
15	June 10, 2022	12.7% (2nd)	11.9% (2nd)	12.2% (2nd)
16	June 13, 2022	12.9% (2nd)	11.1% (2nd)	13.3% (2nd)
17	June 14, 2022	12.9% (2nd)	10.8% (2nd)	13.6% (2nd)
18	June 15, 2022	13.0% (2nd)	11.9% (2nd)	14.1% (2nd)
19	June 16, 2022	13.0% (2nd)	11.5% (2nd)	13.6% (2nd)
20	June 17, 2022	14.3% (2nd)	12.9% (2nd)	13.9% (2nd)
21	June 20, 2022	13.8% (2nd)	12.4% (2nd)	13.9% (2nd)
22	June 21, 2022	13.5% (2nd)	11.6% (2nd)	13.9% (2nd)
23	June 22, 2022	13.0% (2nd)	11.4% (2nd)	15.0% (2nd)
24	June 23, 2022	15.0% (2nd)	13.1% (2nd)	14.9% (2nd)
25	June 24, 2022	13.0% (2nd)	11.0% (2nd)	13.0% (2nd)
26	June 27, 2022	14.7% (2nd)	12.6% (2nd)	15.1% (2nd)
27	June 28, 2022	14.8% (2nd)	12.5% (2nd)	15.6% (2nd)
28	June 29, 2022	14.1% (2nd)	12.7% (2nd)	15.0% (2nd)
29	June 30, 2022	14.3% (2nd)	12.7% (2nd)	13.9% (2nd)
30	July 1, 2022	13.8% (2nd)	11.6% (2nd)	13.8% (2nd)
31	July 4, 2022	15.3% (2nd)	12.8% (2nd)	15.1% (2nd)
32	July 5, 2022	15.4% (2nd)	13.3% (2nd)	16.1% (2nd)
33	July 6, 2022	14.5% (2nd)	12.0% (2nd)	13.5% (2nd)
34	July 7, 2022	15.3% (2nd)	13.4% (2nd)	15.7% (2nd)
35	July 8, 2022	13.7% (2nd)	11.3% (2nd)	N/A
36	July 11, 2022	15.3% (2nd)	12.9% (2nd)	16.2% (2nd)
37	July 12, 2022	15.7% (2nd)	12.8% (2nd)	16.3% (2nd)
38	July 13, 2022	15.0% (2nd)	12.3% (2nd)	16.6% (2nd)
39	July 14, 2022	14.6% (2nd)	12.1% (2nd)	14.5% (2nd)
40	July 15, 2022	13.9% (2nd)	11.7% (2nd)	14.0% (2nd)
41	July 18, 2022	15.8% (2nd)	13.1% (2nd)	17.1% (2nd)
42	July 19, 2022	16.0% (2nd)	13.9% (2nd)	15.2% (2nd)
43	July 20, 2022	14.5% (2nd)	12.8% (2nd)	14.8% (2nd)
44	July 21, 2022	15.9% (2nd)	13.5% (2nd)	15.5% (2nd)
45	July 22, 2022	15.5% (2nd)	13.6% (2nd)	15.1% (2nd)
46	July 25, 2022	16.1% (2nd)	13.9% (2nd)	16.9% (2nd)
47	July 26, 2022	16.0% (2nd)	13.2% (2nd)	16.0% (2nd)
48	July 27, 2022	14.8% (2nd)	12.5% (2nd)	15.6% (2nd)
49	July 28, 2022	16.2% (2nd)	14.5% (2nd)	15.5% (2nd)
50	July 29, 2022	15.5% (2nd)	13.2% (2nd)	16.6% (2nd)
51	August 1, 2022	16.4% (2nd)	13.4% (2nd)	16.9% (2nd)
52	August 2, 2022	16.4% (2nd)	13.7% (2nd)	15.5% (2nd)
53	August 3, 2022	15.5% (2nd)	13.1% (2nd)	14.9% (2nd)
54	August 4, 2022	16.8% (2nd)	14.6% (2nd)	15.6% (2nd)
55	August 5, 2022	15.3% (2nd)	12.6% (2nd)	16.2% (2nd)
56	August 8, 2022	17.0% (2nd)	14.7% (2nd)	16.8% (2nd)
57	August 9, 2022	16.1% (2nd)	13.8% (2nd)	17.6% (2nd)
58	August 10, 2022	15.6% (2nd)	13.1% (2nd)	N/A
59	August 11, 2022	16.2% (2nd)	13.3% (2nd)	N/A
60	August 12, 2022	16.0% (2nd)	13.6% (2nd)	15.3% (2nd)
61	August 15, 2022	16.7% (2nd)	14.0% (2nd)	17.7% (2nd)
62	August 16, 2022	16.6% (2nd)	13.8% (2nd)	17.8% (2nd)
63	August 17, 2022	15.1% (2nd)	12.3% (2nd)	15.9% (2nd)
64	August 18, 2022	15.5% (2nd)	13.6% (2nd)	17.2% (2nd)
65	August 19, 2022	15.9% (2nd)	13.5% (2nd)	16.3% (2nd)
66	August 22, 2022	15.8% (2nd)	13.3% (2nd)	15.8% (2nd)
67	August 23, 2022	16.4% (2nd)	13.4% (2nd)	18.2% (2nd)
68	August 24, 2022	16.0% (2nd)	13.7% (2nd)	14.9% (2nd)
69	August 25, 2022	15.2% (2nd)	12.3% (2nd)	18.7% (2nd)
70	August 26, 2022	15.2% (1st)	13.1% (1st)	16.3% (1st)
71	August 29, 2022	16.4% (2nd)	14.1% (2nd)	15.5% (2nd)
72	August 30, 2022	17.3% (2nd)	14.4% (2nd)	16.6% (2nd)
73	August 31, 2022	15.7% (2nd)	13.0% (2nd)	15.5% (2nd)
74	September 1, 2022	16.8% (2nd)	14.5% (2nd)	17.4% (2nd)
75	September 2, 2022	16.1% (2nd)	13.7% (2nd)	16.9% (2nd)
76	September 5, 2022	17.8% (1st)	15.3% (1st)	17.9% (1st)
77	September 6, 2022	16.8% (2nd)	14.5% (2nd)	18.6% (2nd)
78	September 7, 2022	16.1% (2nd)	14.4% (2nd)	16.4% (2nd)
79	September 8, 2022	15.6% (2nd)	14.1% (2nd)	17.0% (2nd)
80	September 9, 2022	7.2% (5th)	5.9% (7th)	N/A
81	September 12, 2022	15.5% (2nd)	13.1% (2nd)	17.8% (2nd)
82	September 13, 2022	17.2% (2nd)	15.1% (2nd)	17.7% (2nd)
83	September 14, 2022	16.2% (2nd)	14.0% (2nd)	16.8% (2nd)
84	September 15, 2022	17.4% (2nd)	15.4% (2nd)	17.9% (2nd)
85	September 16, 2022	16.4% (2nd)	14.1% (2nd)	16.8% (2nd)
86	September 19, 2022	17.4% (2nd)	14.7% (2nd)	18.2% (2nd)
87	September 20, 2022	16.7% (2nd)	14.1% (2nd)	18.6% (2nd)
88	September 21, 2022	15.8% (2nd)	14.0% (2nd)	16.9% (2nd)
89	September 22, 2022	15.3% (2nd)	13.3% (2nd)	15.2% (2nd)
90	September 23, 2022	16.2% (2nd)	14.5% (2nd)	17.4% (2nd)
91	September 26, 2022	16.8% (2nd)	15.2% (2nd)	17.9% (2nd)
92	September 27, 2022	15.9% (2nd)	13.6% (2nd)	18.5% (2nd)
93	September 28, 2022	16.0% (2nd)	13.6% (2nd)	17.7% (2nd)
94	September 29, 2022	17.2% (2nd)	14.8% (2nd)	17.4% (2nd)
95	September 30, 2022	15.8% (2nd)	13.4% (2nd)	17.4% (2nd)
96	October 3, 2022	17.1% (1st)	15.3% (1st)	17.1% (1st)
97	October 4, 2022	16.3% (1st)	13.7% (1st)	19.0% (1st)
98	October 5, 2022	15.5% (1st)	13.0% (1st)	16.4% (1st)
99	October 6, 2022	16.7% (1st)	14.1% (1st)	18.2% (1st)
100	October 7, 2022	16.0% (1st)	13.9% (1st)	17.2% (1st)
Average		15.203%	13.016%	15.844% (Note: This average ratings is calculated based on the published ratings, the exact average ratings is unknown due to multiple ratings not published.)
In the table above, the blue numbers represent the lowest published ratings and the red numbers represent the highest published ratings.; N/A denotes ratings that was not released.
