= The Second Husband =

2021 South Korean television series

- Promotional poster
- Hangul: 두 번째 남편
- Hanja: 두番째男便
- RR: Du beonjjae nampyeon
- MR: Tu pŏntchae namp'yŏn
- Genre: Melodrama; Revenge; Romance
- Created by: Jang Ji-hoon; MBC Drama Division
- Written by: Seo Hyeon-joo
- Directed by: Kim Chil-bong
- Starring: Cha Seo-won; Uhm Hyun-kyung; Oh Seung-ah; Han Ki-woong
- Theme music composer: Kim Ui-yong; Keyman
- Opening theme: "Like Habit"
- Composer: Ma Sang-woo
- Country of origin: South Korea
- Original language: Korean
- No. of episodes: 150

Production
- Executive producer: Kim Seo-Joon
- Producers: Kim Heung-dong; Kim Hee-yeol
- Running time: 35 minutes
- Production companies: MBC C&I; Pan Entertainment

Original release
- Network: MBC TV
- Release: August 9, 2021 – April 5, 2022

The Second Husband (Korean: 두 번째 남편) is a South Korean television series starring Cha Seo-won, Uhm Hyun-kyung, Han Ki-woong and Oh Seung-ah. The series, directed by Kim Chil-bong and written by Seo Hyeon-joo for Pan Entertainment, is a passionate romance drama in which a woman who has lost her family unfairly ventures out for revenge amid mixed fate and love.

The daily drama premiered on MBC on August 9, 2021, and aired every weekday at 19:10 (KST) till April 5, 2022. In view of the popularity of the series, it was extended for another 30 episodes from its original 120 episodes making a total of 150 episodes.

== Synopsis ==
Second Husband is a passionate romance story. It revolves around Bong Seon-hwa (Uhm Hyun-kyung) and her family surrounding a confectionery company. She underwent an unfortunate childhood, but due to her strong and positive personality, she rises up. Growing up in the same neighborhood she had a long relationship with Moon Sang-hyeok (Han Ki-woong). But, when she unjustly loses her family due to a tragedy born out of an unstoppable desire, she pledges revenge in the mixed fate and love. Bong Seon-Hwa transforms into 'Sharon' in order to restore what was hers.

== Cast ==
=== Main ===
- Cha Seo-won as Yoon Jae-min

The only son of Yoon Dae-gook and Joo Hae-ran (Dae-gook is the chairman of a confectionery company). He has an MBA from the United States, but wanted to become a singer, and quarreled with his parents over his career choices. It was revealed he was actually Bae Seo-hyun, the youngest son of Seon-hwa's adoptive mother Bok Bok-soon, who was kidnapped at birth and eventually ended up unknowingly adopted by Hae-ran.

- Uhm Hyun-kyung as Bong Seon-hwa
  - Lee Hyo-bi as young Bong Seon-hwa

A diligent and positive girl, but due to forcing circumstances, pledges revenge. She has a child after a long relationship with Moon Sang-hyeok, but loses the child due to his betrayal and she wrongfully spent four years in jail for murder.

- Oh Seung-ah as Yoon Jae-kyeong

Jae-min's half sister, the illegitimate child of the chairman of a confectionery company. She's someone who does not hesitate to do anything to fulfill her ambitions. She is the main antagonist who killed Seon-hwa's grandmother and others, and will murder anyone who stands in her way. She was in the end, sentenced to thirty years' imprisonment for the murders and other crimes she committed.

- Han Ki-woong as Moon Sang-hyeok,

Seon-hwa's ex-lover, a heartless man who abandons his lover and child for power and money. He later gotten his comeuppance by spending seven years in prison.

=== Supporting ===
==== Daeguk Group ====
- Jung Sung-mo as Yoon Dae-gook, the chairman of confectionery company. He murdered his best friend in order to pursue Joo Hae Ran, and masks his evil doings from everyone around him. He thinks bloodline is very important and favors Jae-Min over Jae-Gyeong. He fails to acknowledge Yoon Jae-Gyung until she becomes pregnant with his grandson. He even tried to harm Seon-Hwa several times. His crimes were exposed in the end and he was sentenced to fifteen years in prison.
- Ji Soo-won as Joo Hae-ran

Jae-min's mother, Yoon Dae-gook's wife, the chairman of the Ace Welfare Foundation. Despite being quiet and classy always, she is vengeful and clever. She uses Dae-gook to gain power to get revenge at him as she blames him for her daughter's disappearance. It was revealed later that she was Seon-hwa's real mother and felt guilty for abusing and abandoning her real daughter. Eventually, she and Seon-hwa acknowledge each other and their relationship began to improve.

- Kang Yoon as Kim Soo-cheol

The secretary of Chairman Yoon of the confectionery company, who was brought in by Joo Hae-Ran at a young age. He secretly loves Jae-Gyeong and is loyal to her, and helped her commit several crimes. He eventually realised her true nature and thus confessed to the crime Seon-Hwa was accused of, and even exposed Jae-kyung. Soo-chul was in the end, sentenced to five years' jail.

==== Hanok Bakery ====
- Lee Ho-sung as Bae Dal-bong

Bok-Soon's father-in-law and Bae Seo-joon's grandfather. He has considerable wealth, but has frugal ways.

- Kim Hee-jung as Bok Bok-soon

Bae Dal-bong's daughter-in-law. Bae Seo-joon's mother. She lost her daughter Seo-jeong and treats Bong Seon-hwa as a daughter She was revealed to have a youngest son named Seo-hyun, who was kidnapped at birth and remained missing till this day.

- Shin Woo-gyeom as Bae Seo-joon

Bok-soon's son, Bae Dal-bong's grandchild

==== Sang-hyeok's family ====
- Choi Ji-yeon as Yang Mal-ja, Moon Sang-hyeok and Moon Sang-mi's mother. She is shameless and greedy, and thinks very highly of her son.
- Chun Yi-seul as Moon Sang-mi, an aspiring model, Moon Sang-hyeok's sister, she has crush on Bae Seo-joon

==== Bong Seon-hwa's family ====
- Sung Byung-sook as Han Gop-boon, Seon-hwa's grandmother, who was murdered in the middle of the series by Jae-kyung

==== Others ====
- Kim Sung-hee as Park Haeng-sil

Yoon Jae-kyeong's mother, a former room salon madam. She is greedy and evil like her daughter. However, it was revealed that she kept the secret from Dae Guk that Jae-kyeong is not his biological daughter and that she forged the DNA results to deceive him.

- Lee Kan-hee as Ok Kyeong-i

Mal Ja's friend

- Son Kwang-eop as Kang In-ho, an entrepreneur
- Kim Jung-hwa as Choi Eun-gyeol, who was ordered by Yoon Jae-Kyung to pretend to be Bong Bit-na, Joo Hae-ran's biological daughter.

=== Special appearance ===
- Tony Ahn as a producer
- Im Chan-mi (Note: Credited as Kim Chan-mi.)

== Production ==
Initially, Seo Eun-woo was cast in the role of Yoon Jae-kyeong, but due to the production schedule, she dropped out, and Oh Seung-ah took over.

This daily drama marks Uhm Hyun-kyung's reappearance in an MBC production three years after the Saturday revenge drama Hide and Seek in 2018. Uhm Hyun-kyung and Cha Seo-won are also reuniting after playing the second leads in TVN's 2019 miniseries Miss Lee. Oh Seung-ah and Kim Hee-jung are reunited after MBC's 2018 daily drama Secrets and Lies.

On December 7, 2021, one of the drama's staff tested positive for the COVID-19. On December 8, 2021, it was revealed that the main leads and the director are negative.

On January 6, 2022, it was reported that the series is confirmed to air for extended time than its initial planned 120 episodes.

The filming of the series was completed on March 17, 2022.

== Original soundtrack ==
The Second Husband

Soundtrack album by Various Artists
- Released: 2021
- Genre: Soundtrack
- Languages: Korean; English
- Labels: Blending Co., Ltd; MBC C&I; Star & Tree ENT

=== Part 1 ===
Released on August 19, 2021
No.	Title	Lyrics	Music	Artist	Length
1.	"Like Habit" (습관처럼)	Ma Sang-woo, Minmin	Kim Ui-yong, Keyman	Kim Yang	4:05
2.	"Like Habit" (Inst.)				4:05

=== Part 2 ===
Released on September 2, 2021
No.	Title	Lyrics	Music	Artist	Length
1.	"Bye Bye"	Kim Ui-yong, Keyman, Ma Sang-woo	Kim Ui-yong, Keyman, Ma Sang-woo	Kim Chu-ri	4:19
2.	"Bye Bye" (Inst.)				4:19

=== Part 3 ===
Released on September 24, 2021
No.	Title	Lyrics	Music	Artist	Length
1.	"I'm Sorry" (후회가 돼)	Kim Ui-yong, Keyman, Ma Sang-woo	Kim Ui-yong, Keyman, Ma Sang-woo	Leeds	4:10
2.	"I'm Sorry" (Inst.)				4:10

=== Part 4 ===
Released on October 18, 2021
No.	Title	Lyrics	Music	Artist	Length
1.	"What Is Life" (인생 뭐 있나)	Han-jun	Lee Yu-jin	Cha Seo-won	3:08
2.	"What Is Life" (Inst.)				3:08

=== Part 5 ===
Released on October 28, 2021
No.	Title	Lyrics	Music	Artist	Length
1.	"Because of You" (Original Ver.)	Seungmin Hwang, 30 Billion	Seungmin Hwang, Youngmin Kim (Eyelisten), 30 Billion	Cha Seo-won	4:40
2.	"Because of You" (Inst.)				4:40
3.	"Because of You" (Guitar Ver.)			Cha Seo-won	4:40
4.	"Because of You" (Guitar Ver. Ins)			Cha Seo-won	4:40

=== Part 6 ===
Released on November 18, 2021
No.	Title	Lyrics	Music	Artist	Length
1.	"Send" (보내)	Jeff Kim, 30 Billion	BrownChord, Hanye (HANYE), Kim Youngmin (Eyelisten), 30 Billion	Oh Hyun-ran	3:35
2.	"Send" (Inst.)				3:35

=== Part 7 ===
Released on November 30, 2021
No.	Title	Lyrics	Music	Artist	Length
1.	"My Love"	Invincible, Jamie	Invincible, Jamie, Lee Ju-yong	Park Hyun-seo	4:00
2.	"My Love" (Inst.)		Invincible, Jamie, Lee Ju-yong		4:00

=== Part 8 ===
Released on December 6, 2021
No.	Title	Lyrics	Music	Artist	Length
1.	"No Way"	Kim Ui-yong, Keyman, Ma Sang-woo	Kim Ui-yong, Keyman, Ma Sang-woo	Minmin	4:00
2.	"No Way" (Inst.)		Kim Ui-yong, Keyman, Ma Sang-woo		4:00

=== Part 9 ===
Released on December 9, 2021
No.	Title	Lyrics	Music	Artist	Length
1.	"One Person" (한 사람)	Hanjun	Lee Yoojin	Izi (Oh Jinseong)	3:25
2.	"One Person" (Inst.)				3:25

=== Part 10 ===
Released on December 16, 2021
No.	Title	Lyrics	Music	Artist	Length
1.	"Goodbye Lonely"	Sang-Woo Ma, Min-Min	Sang-Woo Ma	Hyeji	3:47
2.	"Goodbye Lonely" (Inst.)				3:25

=== Part 11 ===
Released on January 6, 2022
No.	Title	Lyrics	Music	Artist	Length
1.	"Future" (미래)	Invincible	Kwon Kyung-won, Invincible	Hallim	3:17
2.	"Future" (Inst.)				3:17

=== Part 12 ===
Released on March 30, 2022
No.	Title	Lyrics	Music	Artist	Length
1.	"Shalala" (샤랄라)	Kim Ui-yong, Keyman, Ma Sang-woo	Kim Ui-yong, Keyman, Ma Sang-woo	Cha Seo-won	3:04
2.	"Shalala" (Inst.)		Kim Ui-yong, Keyman, Ma Sang-woo		3:04

== Viewership ==
The Second Husband : South Korea viewers per episode (millions)

Episodes of	Episode number																			
Episodes of	1	2	3	4	5	6	7	8	9	10	11	12	13	14	15	16	17	18	19	20
1–20	N/A	N/A	N/A	.617	N/A	N/A	N/A	.721	.681	TBD	TBD	.685	.673	.739	TBD	TBD	.802	.819	.634	TBD
21-40	.807	.683	.836	.686	TBD	.852	.717	.895	.713	.874	.822	.806	.853	.805	.783	.982	.891	.808	1.062	.881
41-60	.981	.987	.975	1.087	.989	.977	.936	1.061	.952	.992	.963	1.123	1.039	1.013	1.035	.950	1.106	1.078	1.099	1.084
61-80	1.180	1.066	1.178	1.162	1.147	1.091	1.260	.974	1.183	1.352	1.194	1.231	1.254	1.307	1.303	1.151	1.294	1.226	1.235	1.316
81-100	1.281	1.371	1.271	1.296	1.252	1.271	1.470	1.344	1.410	1.359	1.241	1.410	1.315	1.442	1.401	1.389	1.413	1.544	1.618	1.700
101-120	1.651	1.567	1.518	1.492	1.691	1.490	1.621	1.562	1.577	1.726	1.544	1.593	1.565	1.536	1.614	1.526	1.060	1.079	1.190	1.679
121-140	1.487	1.398	1.306	1.408	1.265	1.297	1.465	1.332	1.351	1.368	1.257	1.428	1.373	1.518	1.421	1.484	1.564	1.477	1.445	1.426
141-150	1.468	1.522	1.306	1.314	1.454	1.382	1.565	1.445	1.320	1.383	–									

Source: Audience measurement performed nationwide by °Nielsen Korea.

Ep.	Original broadcast date	Average audience share		
Ep.	Original broadcast date	Nielsen Korea		TNmS
Ep.	Original broadcast date	Nationwide	Seoul	Nationwide
1	August 9, 2021	2.9%	—N/a	—N/a
2	August 10, 2021	2.8%	—N/a	—N/a
3	August 11, 2021	3.2%	—N/a	—N/a
4	August 12, 2021	4.1%	4.1%	—N/a
5	August 13, 2021	3.2%	—N/a	—N/a
6	August 16, 2021	3.7%	—N/a	—N/a
7	August 17, 2021	4.0%	—N/a	—N/a
8	August 18, 2021	4.3%	4.3%	4.4%
9	August 19, 2021	4.2%	3.8%	4.9%
10	August 20, 2021	4.2%	4.7%	—N/a
11	August 23, 2021	5.0%	—N/a	—N/a
12	August 25, 2021 (Note: The episode on August 24, 2021 was not aired due to coverage of the opening ceremony of the 2020 Tokyo Paralympics.)	4.4%	4.5%	5.0%
13	August 26, 2021	5.0%	5.1%	5.1%
14	August 27, 2021	4.7%	5.0%	5.3%
15	August 30, 2021	4.4%	—N/a	4.5%
16	August 31, 2021	4.4%	—N/a	5.5%
17	September 1, 2021	5.0%	4.9%	5.3%
18	September 2, 2021	5.3%	5.3%	5.6%
19	September 3, 2021	4.6%	4.6%	5.6%
20	September 6, 2021	4.6%	4.5%	6.2%
21	September 7, 2021	5.2%	5.2%	5.0%
22	September 8, 2021	4.5%	4.7%	5.0%
23	September 9, 2021	5.1%	4.7%	6.1%
24	September 10, 2021	4.6%	4.4%	—N/a
25	September 13, 2021	4.7%	4.8%	6.0%
26	September 14, 2021	4.9%	5.1%	5.2%
27	September 15, 2021	4.8%	4.9%	4.9%
28	September 16, 2021	5.6%	6.0%	6.3%
29	September 17, 2021	5.1%	5.5%	5.6%
30	September 23, 2021	5.7%	5.7%	6.1%
31	September 24, 2021	5.1%	5.1%	5.1%
32	September 27, 2021	5.4%	5.3%	6.5%
33	September 28, 2021	5.7%	5.4%	6.2%
34	September 29, 2021	5.3%	5.0%	6.2%
35	September 30, 2021	5.3%	5.5%	6.4%
36	October 4, 2021	6.2%	6.0%	6.6%
37	October 5, 2021	5.8%	5.3%	6.6%
38	October 6, 2021	5.8%	5.1%	4.3%
39	October 7, 2021	6.8%	6.2%	7.4%
40	October 8, 2021	5.7%	5.2%	6.2%
41	October 11, 2021	6.1%	5.5%	6.6%
42	October 12, 2021	6.2%	6.0%	7.0%
43	October 13, 2021	6.4%	6.1%	6.7%
44	October 14, 2021	6.4%	6.5%	6.5%
45	October 18, 2021 (Note: 45th episode was not aired on October 15 due to "MBC Newsdesk: PPP's presidential candidate debate".)	6.1%	6.2%	7.2%
46	October 19, 2021	6.2%	6.2%	6.3%
47	October 20, 2021	5.9%	5.7%	7.0%
48	October 21, 2021	6.8%	7.1%	7.7%
49	October 22, 2021	6.2%	6.1%	7.8%
50	October 25, 2021	6.3%	6.1%	7.4%
51	October 26, 2021	6.2%	5.9%	7.9%
52	October 27, 2021	6.8%	6.4%	7.7%
53	October 28, 2021	6.6%	6.1%	7.9%
54	October 29, 2021	6.6%	6.8%	8.1%
55	November 1, 2021	6.6%	6.8%	8.3%
56	November 3, 2021 (Note: 56th episode was not aired on November 2 due to telecast of the second round of 2021 KBO League postseason wild card game.)	5.8%	5.6%	8.1%
57	November 4, 2021	6.7%	6.2%	7.7%
58	November 8, 2021 (Note: 58th episode was not aired on November 5 due to telecast of the second round of 2021 KBO League postseason semi-playoffs.)	6.9%	6.9%	8.1%
59	November 9, 2021	7.0%	6.8%	8.4%
60	November 10, 2021	6.8%	6.1%	8.3%
61	November 11, 2021	7.8%	7.3%	9.2%
62	November 12, 2021	6.9%	6.6%	—N/a
63	November 15, 2021	7.7%	6.8%	8.9%
64	November 16, 2021	7.5%	6.8%	8.6%
65	November 17, 2021	7.6%	7.1%	9.3%
66	November 19, 2021 (Note: 66th episode was not aired on November 18 due to telecast of the 4th round of 2021 Korean Series.)	7.0%	6.8%	8.6%
67	November 22, 2021	7.6%	7.5%	8.7%
68	November 23, 2021	6.2%	5.9%	7.1%
69	November 24, 2021	7.9%	7.9%	9.0%
70	November 25, 2021	8.5%	8.4%	9.5%
71	November 26, 2021	7.6%	7.2%	9.5%
72	November 29, 2021	7.5%	6.8%	9.2%
73	November 30, 2021	7.6%	7.1%	8.8%
74	December 1, 2021	8.0%	7.9%	9.3%
75	December 2, 2021	8.4%	8.3%	9.4%
76	December 3, 2021	7.8%	7.5%	—N/a
77	December 6, 2021	8.0%	7.5%	8.2%
78	December 7, 2021	7.7%	7.4%	—N/a
79	December 8, 2021	7.4%	6.9%	10.2%
80	December 9, 2021	8.5%	8.0%	10.0%
81	December 10, 2021	8.2%	7.7%	9.0%
82	December 13, 2021	8.9%	8.6%	8.7%
83	December 14, 2021	8.4%	7.9%	9.9%
84	December 15, 2021	7.9%	7.7%	10.3%
85	December 16, 2021	8.3%	8.4%	9.6%
86	December 17, 2021	8.2%	7.7%	9.8%
87	December 20, 2021	8.9%	8.1%	10.8%
88	December 21, 2021	8.4%	8.2%	9.6%
89	December 22, 2021	9.0%	8.9%	10.2%
90	December 23, 2021	8.6%	7.9%	10.0%
91	December 24, 2021	8.1%	8.0%	9.4%
92	December 27, 2021	8.6%	8.5%	9.5%
93	December 28, 2021	8.5%	8.3%	9.8%
94	December 29, 2021	8.6%	8.4%	10.0%
95	December 30, 2021	9.0%	8.2%	10.7%
96	December 31, 2021	8.9%	8.6%	10.1%
97	January 3, 2022	9.0%	8.4%	9.6%
98	January 4, 2022	9.6%	8.4%	8.9%
99	January 5, 2022	9.5%	8.7%	10.1%
100	January 6, 2022	10.5%	9.8%	9.7%
101	January 7, 2022	9.7%	8.7%	9.7%
102	January 10, 2022	9.3%	8.0%	9.4%
103	January 11, 2022	8.9%	7.7%	9.3%
104	January 12, 2022	8.9%	8.3%	—N/a
105	January 13, 2022	9.9%	8.9%	9.3%
106	January 14, 2022	9.2%	—N/a	9.8%
107	January 17, 2022	9.7%	8.7%	9.1%
108	January 18, 2022	9.1%	8.6%	9.0%
109	January 19, 2022	9.5%	9.1%	10.1%
110	January 20, 2022	10.3%	9.9%	10.4%
111	January 21, 2022	9.9%	9.3%	9.7%
112	January 24, 2022	9.3%	8.8%	9.2%
113	January 25, 2022	9.7%	9.5%	10.3%
114	January 26, 2022	9.6%	9.3%	9.4%
115	January 27, 2022	9.6%	9.2%	10.1%
116	January 28, 2022	9.9%	9.7%	8.9%
117	January 31, 2022	5.7%	5.8%	6.5%
118	February 1, 2022	6.6%	6.8%	7.2%
119	February 2, 2022	7.1%	7.1%	7.2%
120	February 3, 2022	10.5%	10.5%	9.5%
121	February 4, 2022	9.1%	8.5%	9.6%
122	February 22, 2022 (Note: 122nd episode will be aired on February 22 due to telecast of 2022 Beijing Winter Olympics for 2 weeks and third presidential election debate on February 21.)	8.7%	8.7%	9.1%
123	February 23, 2022	7.8%	7.6%	9.2%
124	February 24, 2022	8.7%	8.4%	9.2%
125	February 25, 2022	7.8%	7.8%	9.0%
126	February 28, 2022	8.0%	7.8%	9.9%
127	March 1, 2022	8.6%	8.6%	10.4%
128	March 2, 2022	8.7%	8.9%	9.4%
129	March 3, 2022	8.5%	8.2%	9.7%
130	March 4, 2022	8.2%	8.1%	9.7%
131	March 7, 2022	7.4%	6.9%	8.3%
132	March 8, 2022	8.7%	8.1%	9.5%
133	March 11, 2022	8.6%	8.3%	10.0%
134	March 14, 2022	8.5%	8.1%	10.6%
135	March 15, 2022	8.7%	8.4%	9.5%
136	March 16, 2022	9.3%	9.4%	9.5%
137	March 17, 2022	9.6%	9.1%	11.0%
138	March 18, 2022	9.1%	8.9%	9.1%
139	March 21, 2022	9.0%	8.5%	9.4%
140	March 22, 2022	9.0%	8.8%	9.7%
141	March 23, 2022	8.9%	8.9%	9.0%
142	March 24, 2022	9.5%	9.2%	10.5%
143	March 25, 2022	8.6%	8.3%	9.9%
144	March 28, 2022	8.2%	7.9%	9.1%
145	March 29, 2022	9.0%	8.7%	8.9%
146	March 30, 2022	8.6%	8.6%	9.8%
147	March 31, 2022	9.9%	9.6%	10.5%
148	April 1, 2022	8.9%	8.8%	9.0%
149	April 4, 2022	8.2%	7.9%	9.6%
150	April 5, 2022	9.0%	8.9%	9.7%
Average		—	—	—
In this table, the blue numbers represent the lowest ratings and the red numbers represent the highest ratings.; N/A denotes that the rating is not known.

== Awards and nominations ==
Year	Award	Category	Recipient	Result	Ref.
2021	MBC Drama Awards	Top Excellence Award, Actor in a Daily Drama	Cha Seo-won	Won	
2021	MBC Drama Awards	Top Excellence Award, Actress in a Daily Drama	Uhm Hyun-kyung	Won	
2022	APAN Star Awards	Top Excellence Award, Actress in a Serial Drama	Uhm Hyun-kyung	Nominated	
2022	APAN Star Awards	Excellence Award, Actor in a Serial Drama	Cha Seo-won	Nominated	
