= A Sea of Her Own =

2017 South Korean television series

- Promotional poster
- Hangul: 그 여자의 바다
- RR: Geu yeojaui bada
- MR: Kŭ yŏjaŭi pada
- Genre: Period drama; Family
- Written by: Kim Mi-Jung; Lee Jung-Dae
- Directed by: Han Chul-Kyung
- Creative director: Choi Yun-soo
- Starring: Oh Seung-ah; Kim Joo-yong; Han Yoo-yi; Choi Sung-jae
- Narrated by: Seo Hye-jung
- Country of origin: South Korea
- Original language: Korean
- No. of episodes: 120

Production
- Executive producers: Choi Ji-young; Kim Sung-geun
- Producer: Kim Min-tae
- Running time: 40 min
- Production company: KBS Drama Production

Original release
- Network: KBS
- Release: February 27 – August 11, 2017

A Sea of Her Own (Korean: 그 여자의 바다; lit. 'Sea of the Woman') is a 2017 South Korea morning soap opera starring Oh Seung-ah, Kim Joo-yong, Han Yoo-yi and Choi Sung-jae. It aired on KBS2 from February 27, 2017 on Mondays to Fridays at 09:00 for 120 episodes.

It is the 42nd TV Novel series (11th in 2010s) of KBS.

== Summary ==
Set in the 1960s and 1970s, Yoon Soo In is consistently a top-ranked student in school, but due to her family's struggling financial circumstances, she begins to work at a factory instead of going to college. She nevertheless pursues her dreams.

== Cast ==
=== Main ===
- Oh Seung-ah as Yoon Soo-in
- Kim Joo-yong as Choi Jung-wook
- Han Yoo-yi as Jung Se-young
- Choi Sung-jae as Kim Sun-woo

=== Supporting ===
==== People around Soo-in ====
- Lee Dae-yeon as Yoon Dong-chul
- Park Hyun-suk as Park Soon-ok
- Lee Hyun-kyung as Lee Young-sun
- Han Eun-seo as Yoon Jung-in
- Kim Tae-seol as Yoon Min-jae
- Kim Do-yeon as Yoon Dal-ja
- Choi Woo-suk as Kang Tae-soo
- Chae Min-hee as Oh Seol-hee

==== Taesan Noodle Factory ====
- Kim Seung-wook as Jung Jae-man
- Lee Kan-hee as Hong Sook-hee
- Son Jong-bum as Hong Man-pyo

== Ratings ==
- In this table, The blue numbers represent the lowest ratings and the red numbers represent the highest ratings.
- NR denotes that the drama did not rank in the top 20 daily programs on that date.

Ep.	Original broadcast date	Average audience share			
Ep.	Original broadcast date	TNmS		AGB Nielsen	
Ep.	Original broadcast date	Nationwide	Seoul	Nationwide	Seoul
1	February 27, 2017	7.9% (15th)	6.5% (18th)	7.8% (17th)	7.1% (17th)
2	February 28, 2017	8.7% (12th)	7.4% (13th)	8.0% (15th)	7.5% (18th)
3	March 1, 2017	8.9% (8th)	7.6% (14th)	7.1% (NR)	(NR)
4	March 2, 2017	9.0% (11th)	8.1% (12th)	8.0% (16th)	6.8% (20th)
5	March 3, 2017	8.8% (13th)	7.7% (13th)	8.1% (16th)	(NR)
6	March 6, 2017	7.9% (18th)	7.7% (12th)	7.5% (NR)	(NR)
7	March 7, 2017	9.4% (12th)	7.9% (11th)	7.8% (16th)	(NR)
8	March 8, 2017	8.9% (NR)	(NR)	7.4% (19th)	(NR)
9	March 9, 2017	8.0% (14th)	6.4% (15th)	7.1% (17th)	(NR)
10	March 10, 2017	9.4% (5th)	8.9% (5th)	8.7% (8th)	8.2% (8th)
11	March 13, 2017	9.1% (15th)	8.1% (12th)	7.8% (18th)	(NR)
12	March 14, 2017	8.8% (12th)	7.3% (10th)	7.2% (19th)	6.4% (19th)
13	March 15, 2017	9.2% (9th)	7.9% (11th)	7.2% (16th)	(NR)
14	March 16, 2017	8.9% (16th)	7.7% (15th)	7.6% (16th)	6.6% (18th)
15	March 17, 2017	8.8% (14th)	7.6% (15th)	7.1% (17th)	(NR)
16	March 20, 2017	9.3% (14th)	7.9% (15th)	6.7% (NR)	(NR)
17	March 21, 2017	4.4% (NR)	(NR)	4.6% (NR)	(NR)
18	March 22, 2017	8.4% (14th)	7.4% (16th)	7.5% (17th)	6.6% (19th)
19	March 23, 2017	7.8% (12th)	8.0% (11th)	6.1% (20th)	(NR)
20	March 24, 2017	8.8% (12th)	7.7% (16th)	7.4% (16th)	(NR)
21	March 27, 2017	9.6% (13th)	8.5% (12th)	6.7% (20th)	(NR)
22	March 28, 2017	9.4% (13th)	8.1% (15th)	7.7% (15th)	(NR)
23	March 29, 2017	9.0% (15th)	8.1% (11th)	7.0% (18th)	6.1%(20th)
24	March 30, 2017	8.6% (13th)	7.7% (15th)	7.4% (14th)	6.7% (18th)
25	March 31, 2017	9.3% (13th)	7.3% (16th)	7.0% (17th)	6.1% (18th)
26	April 3, 2017	8.9% (16th)	7.7% (17th)	6.9% (18th)	(NR)
27	April 4, 2017	8.6% (15th)	7.4% (14th)	7.0% (18th)	(NR)
28	April 5, 2017	9.2% (14th)	7.7% (20th)	7.0% (20th)	(NR)
29	April 6, 2017	9.4% (11th)	7.7% (16th)	6.9% (NR)	(NR)
30	April 7, 2017	9.1% (11th)	8.4% (12th)	6.8% (17th)	5.9% (18th)
31	April 10, 2017	9.0% (14th)	8.6% (10th)	6.7% (NR)	(NR)
32	April 11, 2017	9.1% (12th)	7.5% (16th)	7.2% (17th)	(NR)
33	April 12, 2017	8.4% (16th)	(NR)	6.5% (NR)	(NR)
34	April 13, 2017	8.9% (16th)	8.4% (15th)	7.3% (16th)	(NR)
35	April 14, 2017	8.7% (13th)	8.1% (14th)	6.6% (18th)	(NR)
36	April 17, 2017	9.4% (15th)	7.9% (15th)	(NR)	(NR)
37	April 18, 2017	9.8% (10th)	8.9% (10th)	7.5% (14th)	6.8% (15th)
38	April 19, 2017	9.1% (14th)	7.8% (15th)	7.0% (17th)	(NR)
39	April 20, 2017	9.3% (13th)	8.8% (11th)	8.0% (13th)	7.0% (17th)
40	April 21, 2017	10.1% (10th)	9.1% (9th)	7.6% (13th)	6.7% (16th)
41	April 24, 2017	9.1% (13th)	8.2% (13th)	7.1% (18th)	(NR)
42	April 25, 2017	9.2% (11th)	8.5% (13th)	7.7% (14th)	6.8% (17th)
43	April 26, 2017	9.6% (11th)	8.9% (9th)	7.8% (11th)	(NR)
44	April 27, 2017	9.1% (12th)	8.1% (12th)	8.2% (12th)	6.9% (19th)
45	April 28, 2017	9.6% (9th)	9.3% (6th)	8.0% (11th)	6.4% (15th)
46	May 1, 2017	8.5% (14th)	7.9% (13th)	7.2% (16th)	(NR)
47	May 2, 2017	8.8% (8th)	8.6% (7th)	7.3% (9th)	6.4% (11th)
48	May 3, 2017	8.4% (9th)	7.8% (9th)	7.1% (11th)	(NR)
49	May 4, 2017	9.1% (7th)	8.4% (9th)	7.2% (13th)	(NR)
50	May 5, 2017	10.0% (7th)	9.7% (5th)	6.9% (16th)	5.9% (20th)
51	May 8, 2017	9.2% (13th)	9.0% (10th)	7.7% (14th)	6.6% (18th)
52	May 9, 2017	10.4% (5th)	9.6% (5th)	8.4% (7th)	6.5% (13th)
53	May 10, 2017	7.1% (12th)	6.8% (17th)	6.2% (18th)	(NR)
54	May 11, 2017	10.0% (9th)	9.4% (9th)	7.9% (13th)	7.2% (16th)
55	May 12, 2017	8.6% (13th)	7.9% (13th)	8.4% (9th)	7.1% (16th)
56	May 15, 2017	11.6% (8th)	10.5% (8th)	7.5% (15th)	(NR)
57	May 16, 2017	9.6% (11th)	8.9% (9th)	8.3% (11th)	7.2% (14th)
58	May 17, 2017	10.7% (7th)	10.0% (8th)	8.2% (11th)	(NR)
59	May 18, 2017	10.0% (7th)	9.0% (9th)	9.4% (9th)	8.1% (10th)
60	May 19, 2017	10.9% (6th)	9.6% (7th)	8.6% (9th)	6.9% (15th)
61	May 22, 2017	10.1% (10th)	9.2% (8th)	8.4% (9th)	7.2% (10th)
62	May 23, 2017	7.7% (16th)	6.5% (20th)	6.8% (19th)	(NR)
63	May 24, 2017	10.4% (9th)	9.0% (9th)	9.0% (9th)	7.7% (14th)
64	May 25, 2017	9.8% (11th)	8.7% (10th)	8.4% (11th)	7.0% (17th)
65	May 26, 2017	9.9% (8th)	8.9% (7th)	8.9% (9th)	7.6% (11th)
66	May 29, 2017	9.8% (8th)	9.2% (10th)	9.0% (9th)	7.9% (14th)
67	May 30, 2017	10.2% (6th)	9.4% (8th)	10.1% (5th)	8.9% (8th)
68	May 31, 2017	10.6% (8th)	9.9% (7th)	8.6% (12th)	7.1% (17th)
69	June 1, 2017	11.1% (7th)	10.3% (8th)	9.6% (9th)	8.3% (12th)
70	June 2, 2017	9.3% (8th)	8.3% (10th)	9.3% (8th)	8.0% (10th)
71	June 5, 2017	10.4% (6th)	9.9% (5th)	9.2% (8th)	7.9% (10th)
72	June 6, 2017	7.5% (18th)	(NR)	7.0% (19th)	(NR)
73	June 7, 2017	10.5% (8th)	9.5% (7th)	9.2% (10th)	7.6% (16th)
74	June 8, 2017	11.8% (5th)	10.2% (7th)	9.3% (10th)	8.3% (11th)
75	June 9, 2017	10.7% (6th)	9.3% (8th)	9.5% (8th)	8.0% (10th)
76	June 12, 2017	10.2% (7th)	9.0% (8th)	8.5% (9th)	7.3% (13th)
77	June 13, 2017	10.9% (4th)	9.0% (6th)	8.7% (7th)	7.1% (16th)
78	June 14, 2017	10.3% (8th)	8.3% (12th)	8.5% (8th)	7.2% (13th)
79	June 15, 2017	10.1% (6th)	8.5% (8th)	9.1% (8th)	8.1% (11th)
80	June 16, 2017	10.8% (5th)	9.3% (6th)	9.2% (7th)	8.3% (9th)
81	June 19, 2017	10.3% (6th)	8.8% (6th)	9.3% (7th)	8.1% (10th)
82	June 20, 2017	10.6% (5th)	9.3% (6th)	8.6% (8th)	7.6% (12th)
83	June 21, 2017	10.6% (6th)	8.9% (7th)	8.9% (11th)	7.7% (13th)
84	June 22, 2017	11.2% (6th)	8.9% (9th)	8.8% (10th)	7.8% (13th)
85	June 23, 2017	10.3% (8th)	8.6% (10th)	8.6% (8th)	7.5% (11th)
86	June 26, 2017	10.0% (8th)	8.6% (6th)	9.6% (7th)	8.2% (9th)
87	June 27, 2017	11.2% (5th)	9.2% (6th)	9.7% (7th)	7.4% (14th)
88	June 28, 2017	10.0% (5th)	8.8% (6th)	8.8% (8th)	7.2% (13th)
89	June 29, 2017	10.5% (7th)	8.5% (7th)	9.0% (8th)	8.1% (11th)
90	June 30, 2017	7.9% (13th)	6.8% (15th)	8.0% (11th)	6.8% (14th)
91	July 3, 2017	11.7% (5th)	9.2% (7th)	9.7% (7th)	8.6% (8th)
92	July 4, 2017	12.6% (4th)	10.4% (5th)	9.1% (10th)	7.4% (15th)
93	July 5, 2017	11.3% (7th)	8.7% (10th)	8.7% (10th)	7.5% (14th)
94	July 6, 2017	11.3% (7th)	9.5% (9th)	9.6% (8th)	8.4% (11th)
95	July 7, 2017	11.5% (8th)	9.8% (8th)	9.8% (7th)	8.8% (10th)
96	July 10, 2017	12.0% (6th)	9.3% (11th)	9.9% (7th)	8.4% (13th)
97	July 11, 2017	12.1% (5th)	9.4% (11th)	9.8% (7th)	8.8% (9th)
98	July 12, 2017	11.6% (7th)	10.4% (8th)	8.9% (9th)	8.2% (10th)
99	July 13, 2017	10.8% (9th)	9.2% (12th)	9.1% (10th)	8.1% (12th)
100	July 14, 2017	12.7% (5th)	11.3% (5th)	9.4% (8th)	8.0% (12th)
101	July 17, 2017	12.5% (5th)	10.4% (5th)	9.3% (9th)	8.4% (14th)
102	July 18, 2017	12.2% (4th)	9.6% (9th)	9.2% (10th)	8.2% (10th)
103	July 19, 2017	12.9% (4th)	10.8% (6th)	9.1% (8th)	8.6% (9th)
104	July 20, 2017	11.0% (7th)	8.7% (10th)	8.6% (9th)	6.9% (16th)
105	July 21, 2017	11.6% (6th)	9.8% (8th)	9.2% (10th)	7.9% (12th)
106	July 24, 2017	11.9% (4th)	10.1% (8th)	8.8% (13th)	7.6% (17th)
107	July 25, 2017	12.6% (4th)	10.9% (6th)	10.2% (7th)	9.4% (7th)
108	July 26, 2017	11.9% (4th)	9.3% (7th)	9.7% (5th)	8.9% (9th)
109	July 27, 2017	11.9% (4th)	10.6% (5th)	9.3% (7th)	8.7% (10th)
110	July 28, 2017	12.2% (5th)	9.5% (10th)	10.4% (7th)	9.8% (8th)
111	July 31, 2017	12.6% (4th)	10.1% (6th)	10.2% (8th)	9.4% (10th)
112	August 1, 2017	12.5% (5th)	10.1% (7th)	10.2% (6th)	8.4% (9th)
113	August 2, 2017	11.7% (4th)	9.5% (6th)	9.8% (4th)	8.6% (8th)
114	August 3, 2017	12.6% (4th)	9.8% (6th)	10.4% (5th)	9.4% (8th)
115	August 4, 2017	11.5% (5th)	9.7% (8th)	10.0% (9th)	9.0% (10th)
116	August 7, 2017	12.3% (4th)	10.0% (6th)	10.7% (7th)	9.3% (9th)
117	August 8, 2017	14.3% (4th)	11.8% (5th)	11.3% (5th)	9.9% (6th)
118	August 9, 2017	13.1% (4th)	10.0% (6th)	10.0% (6th)	8.4% (9th)
119	August 10, 2017	14.1% (4th)	11.1% (6th)	11.1% (5th)	9.4% (8th)
120	August 11, 2017	13.4% (4th)	10.9% (5th)	11.5% (5th)	9.5% (7th)
Average		10.1%	%	8.3%	%

- Episode 17 did not air on Mar. 21 due to a special news broadcast.

== Awards and nominations ==
Year	Award	Category	Nominee	Result
2017	31st KBS Drama Awards	Excellence Award, Actress in a Daily Drama	Oh Seung-ah	Nominated
