= Uhm Hyun-kyung =

South Korean actress (born 1986)

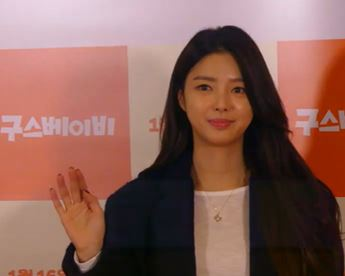
- Uhm in 2019
- Born: November 4, 1986 (age 40); Nonsan, South Korea
- Other name: Eom Hyeon-kyeong
- Education: Konkuk University – Department of Film Art
- Occupation: Actress
- Years active: 2005–present
- Agent: Yeojin Entertainment
- Spouse: Cha Seo-won (m. 2024)
- Children: 1

Korean name
- Hangul: 엄현경
- Hanja: 嚴賢璟
- RR: Eom Hyeongyeong
- MR: Ŏm Hyŏn'gyŏng

Uhm Hyun-kyung (Korean: 엄현경; born November 4, 1986) is a South Korean actress. She first appeared in Rainbow Romance in 2005. In her recent years, Hyun-kyung became notable for playing the evil and two-faced villain Min Soo-a in Hide and Seek. Recently, she starred as the female lead in the daily melodrama Man in a Veil.

== Personal life ==
=== Relationship and marriage ===
On June 5, 2023, it was announced that Uhm and actor Cha Seo-won, her co-star in Second Husband would be getting married in May next year and expecting their first child. On October 16, 2023, it was announced that she gave birth to a son.

== Filmography ==
=== Film ===
Year	Title	Role	Ref.
2006	Ice Bar	(cameo)	
2012	Hoya	Do-mi	

=== Television series ===
Year	Title	Role	Notes	Ref.
2005	Rainbow Romance	Uhm Hyun-kyung		
2006	Just Run!	Lee Soo-jung		
2007	Capital Scandal	Ueda Miyuki		
2007	The Innocent Woman	Seo Ah-young		
2011	Detectives in Trouble	Seo Hye-ran		
2011	Bravo, My Love!	Mi-ra	Guest appearance	
2011	KBS Drama Special: "Strawberry Ice Cream"	Han Joon-kyung		
2011	Garden of Heaven	Kim Myung-ok		
2012	The King's Doctor	So Ka-young		
2013	KBS Drama Special: "Sirius"	Kim Ahn-na		
2013	Good Doctor	Na In-young		
2013	KBS Drama Special: "The Unwelcome Guest"	Young-hee		
2014	Pluto Secret Society	Song Soo-ji		
2014	Let's Eat	Restaurant customer	Episode 16	
2014	Mother's Garden	Kim Soo-jin		
2014	The Greatest Marriage	Hyun Myung-yi		
2015	House of Bluebird	Seo Mi-jin		
2015	All is Well	Kang Hee-jung		
2016	The Good Wife	Lee Eun-joo	Episode 2	
2017	Innocent Defendant	Na Yeon-hee		
2017	Single Wife	Lee Ra-hee		
2017	Shut Up and Smash	Park Hyun-kyung		
2018	Hide and Seek	Ha Yeon-joo		
2019	Miss Lee	Koo Ji-na		
2020	Man in a Veil	Han Yoo-jung		
2021	The Second Husband	Bong Seon-hwa / Sharon Pu		
2024	The Brave Yong Su-jeong	Yong Soo-jung		
2026	Our Happy Days	Jo Eun-ae		

=== Television shows ===
Year	Title	Role	Notes	Ref.
2006	X-Man	Cast member	Episode 127–143	
2016–2018	Happy Together	Cast member	Season 3 (episode 438–557)	
2016	Beauty Sky	Cast member		
2019	Law of the Jungle	Cast member	in Thailand	
2019	Super Hearer	Villain		

=== Music video appearances ===
Year	Song title	Artist	Ref.
2006	"I'm in Tears"	Bubble Sisters	
2006	"Memory"	Melo Breeze	
2006	"Love Is"	The Name	
2006	"A Person Who Gives Happiness"	Lee Soo-young, Shin Dong-yup	
2007	"Because Love is Lost"	Krygen, Cindy	
2008	"Send-Off"	Makustle, Park Ki-young	
2008	"Emoticon"	Canaan, Lee Ji-hye, Kim Kyung-wook	
2008	"Between Hidden Time"	Yoon Gun	
2009	"Even If Love Is Also Lonely"	Taein	
2011	"Love Me"	Bae Da-hae	
2013	"Walking in the Rain"	Verbal Jint, Bumkey	

== Awards and nominations ==
Name of the award ceremony, year presented, category, nominee of the award, and the result of the nomination
Award ceremony	Year	Category	Nominee / Work	Result	Ref.
APAN Star Awards	2022	Top Excellence Award, Actress in a Serial Drama	The Second Husband	Nominated	
KBS Drama Awards	2015	Best Supporting Actress	House of Bluebird & All is Well	Won	
KBS Entertainment Awards	2016	Best Newcomer	Happy Together	Won	
MBC Drama Awards	2018	Excellence Award, Actress in a Weekend Special Project	Hide and Seek	Nominated	
MBC Drama Awards	2021	Top Excellence Award, Actress in a Daily Drama	The Second Husband	Won	
MBC Entertainment Awards	2022	Rookie Award in Variety Category	Omniscient Interfering View	Nominated	
