= Han Ki-woong =

South Korean actor

- Born: Han Ki-woong; 30 December 1987 (age 38); Seoul, South Korea
- Other name: Han Gi-woong
- Occupation: Actor
- Years active: 2012–present
- Agent: Bright Entertainment
- Known for: Love to the End; The Second Husband; Mother of Mine
- Family: Han Ki-won (twin brother)

Han Ki-woong is a South Korean actor. He is known for his roles in dramas such as Love to the End, Mother of Mine, Apgujeong Midnight Sun and The Second Husband.

== Filmography ==
=== Television series ===
Year	Title	Role	Ref.
2012	Light and Shadow	Gi-woong	
2013	I Can Hear Your Voice	Jeong Pil-seung	
2013	Jin Jin	Lee Ji-hoon	
2013-17	Ugly Miss Young-ae	Han Ki-woong	
2014	Apgujeong Midnight Sun	Kang-ho	
2015	Alchemist	Seo Jun-oh	
2016	The Royal Gambler	Sa-woon	
2017	Queen of Mystery	Cha Min-woo / No Doo-gil	
2017	Innocent Defendant	Cha Min-ho (young)	
2018	Love to the End	Park Jae-dong	
2018	Man in the Kitchen	Hee-cheol	
2019	Mother of Mine	Peter Park	
2019	Melting Me Softly	Lee Jung-woo	
2020	Team Bulldog: Off-Duty Investigation	Kim Min-seok	
2021	The Second Husband	Moon Sang-hyuk	
2023	Woman in a Veil	Nam Yoo-jin	

== Awards and nominations ==
Name of the award ceremony, year presented, category, nominee of the award, and the result of the nomination
Award ceremony	Year	Category	Nominee / Work	Result	Ref.
KBS Drama Awards	2023	Excellence Award, Actor in a Daily Drama	Woman in a Veil	Nominated	
