= Oh Seung-ah =

South Korean actress (born 1988)

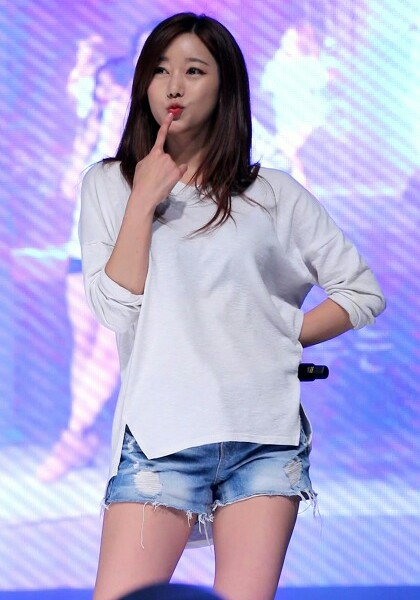
- Oh in May 2015
- Born: September 13, 1988 (age 38); Seoul, South Korea
- Education: Sejong University – Department of Film Arts
- Occupations: Actress; singer
- Years active: 2009–present
- Agent: Starhue Entertainment
- Musical career
- Genre: K-pop
- Instrument: Vocals
- Years active: 2009–2016
- Label: DSP Media
- Formerly of: Rainbow

Korean name
- Hangul: 오승아
- RR: O Seunga
- MR: O Sŭnga

Oh Seung-ah (Korean: 오승아, born September 13, 1988), is a South Korean actress and singer. She is a former member of the girl group Rainbow. She is best known for her role in The Second Husband (2021–2022), which gained her the title of "Serial Villain".

== Life and career ==
=== 1988–2016: Early life and career beginnings ===
Oh was born on September 13, 1988, in Seoul, South Korea. She has attended Changduk Girls' High School and Sangmyung University. Oh was given the choice to debut with Kara or Rainbow, but she chose Rainbow because she was friends with some of the members before debuting.

After becoming a member of Rainbow, she also focused on acting. She was a member of the group until its disbandment in 2016.

=== 2017–present: Activities as an actress and leading roles ===
She then started acting and starred in A Sea of Her Own, for which she was nominated for Excellence Award, Actress in a Daily Drama in 2017. She also starred in Grand Prince as a supporting role, for which she was praised by fans. In 2018 she played a protagonist villain role in Secrets and Lies for which she won the Best Actress award. In 2019 she was the Ambassador of Happy Angel. She was praised for her acting by playing a villainess role in Bad Love.

In 2021, Oh starred in the melodrama series The Second Husband as the main villain of the series playing the role of Yoon Jae-kyeong. In April 2021, Oh signed with Starhue Entertainment. In 2022, Oh returned to the small screen again as Kang Ba-da, the ruthless chaebol of Le Blanc and the lead villain of Vengeance of the Bride.

== Filmography ==
=== Film ===
Year	Title	Role	Notes	Ref.
2011	Heartbeat	Girl group member	Bit part	

=== Television series ===
Year	Title	Role	Notes	Ref.
2010	Big Thing	Mina		
2011–2014	The Clinic for Married Couples: Love and War	Soo-yeong	Cameo	
2013	The Dramatic	Seung-ah		
2013	Play Guide	Oh Seung-ah	Cameo	
2014–2015	Pinocchio	MSC news reporter interviewer	Cameo	
2014	Jang Bo-ri Is Here!	Choi Yoo-ra	Cameo	
2016	88 Street	Somi		
2017	KBS TV Novel – "A Sea of Her Own"	Yoon Soo-in		
2018	Grand Prince	Kim Hyo-bin		
2018–2019	Secrets and Lies	Shin Hwa-gyon		
2019	Drama Stage – "My Wife's Bed"	Lee Yi-na		
2019	Bad Love	Hang Yeon-soo		
2021	A Good Supper	Department store VVIP customer	Cameo	
2021	Love (ft. Marriage and Divorce)	Lee Yeon-hee	Cameo (Episode 1)	
2021–2022	The Second Husband	Yoon Jae-gyeong		
2022	Young Lady and Gentleman	Ahn Ji-min	Cameo (Episode 49–50)	
2022	Vengeance of the Bride	Kang Ba-da		
2023–2024	The Third Marriage	Jung Da-jung		
2025	Motel California	Secretary Oh		
2025	To the Moon	Jo Soo-jin		

=== Web series ===
Year	Title	Role	Ref.
TBA	Shine, My Life	Bitna	

=== Television shows ===
Year	Title	Role	Notes	Ref.
2012	The Romantic and Idol	Regular member	Season 1	
2020	King of Mask Singer	Contestant		
2022	Romantic Doctor Im Chae-moo	Cast Member		
2022	Real Barracks Talk	Host		

== Ambassadorship ==
- Public Relations Ambassador for The Miracle of 119 Won (2021)

== Awards and nominations ==
Name of the award ceremony, year presented, category, nominee of the award, and the result of the nomination
Award ceremony	Year	Category	Nominee / Work	Result	Ref.
Broadcast Actors Awards	2022	10 People Who Shined Korea	The Second Husband	Won	
KBS Drama Awards	2017	Excellence Award, Actress in a Daily Drama	A Sea of Her Own	Nominated	
MBC Drama Awards	2018	Best New Actress	Secrets and Lies	Won	
MBC Drama Awards	2024	Top Excellence Award, Actress in a Daily/Short Drama	The Third Marriage	Won	
