= Super Hearer =

South Korean television show

- Promotional poster
- Hangul: 슈퍼히어러
- RR: Syupeo hieoreo
- MR: Syup'ŏ hiŏrŏ
- Genre: Reality Show; Music Show
- Presented by: Jang Sung-kyu
- Country of origin: South Korea
- Original language: Korean
- No. of seasons: 1
- No. of episodes: 8

Production
- Production location: South Korea
- Running time: 90 minutes

Original release
- Network: tvN
- Release: June 16 – August 4, 2019

Super Hearer (Korean: 슈퍼히어러) is a South Korean music reality show program on tvN.

Season 1 of the show aired on tvN starting from June 16, 2019 to August 4, 2019 on Sundays at 22:40 (KST).

== Synopsis ==
This is a music reality show program where it features a panel of 5 "Hearers" and a panel of 5 "Villains". In each episode, there will be a featured theme. The Hearers' job is to listen to the different singing voices and find the correct contestant(s) that fits the theme. On the other hand, the Villains' job is to interfere the Hearers by making them confused which in turn preventing them from getting the right answers. If the Hearers won, the prize money will be given to them, if not the prize money will be given to the 5 contestants.

=== Gameplay ===
Round 1 is to listen to all 5 contestants sing 1 song, and then in the next part, each of the 5 contestants sing for 30 seconds. The Hearers would come together to choose only 1 contestant who they believe to fit the theme. If succeeded, the Hearers win ₩1,000,000 from this round.

Round 2 is to listen to each of the remaining 4 contestants sing a part of a song or a small medley, and their real identities are shown to only the Villains and the audience. The Hearers will have to eventually decide on the contestant(s) out of the remaining 4 who they believe to fit the theme. If the Hearers chose the correct contestant(s), they will get ₩2,000,000.

== Cast ==
=== Host ===
- Jang Sung-kyu

=== Hearers ===
Name	Episode
Yoon Jong-shin	1–2
Kangta (H.O.T.)	1–8
Jang Yun-jeong	1, 3-4, 6
K.Will	1–8

=== Villains ===
Name	Episode
Kim Gu-ra	1–8
Park Joon-hyung (g.o.d)	1–4, 7-8
Uhm Hyun-kyung	1–8
Boom	1, 3-8
Hwang Je-sung	1–8

== List of Episodes ==
Contestants' names in bold are the contestants who fulfill the theme.

– Succeeded in guessing correctly.
– Failed to guess correctly.

Episode	Broadcast Date	Theme	Guest(s)	Contestants (Note: Numbered according to where they stood)	Result		
Episode	Broadcast Date	Theme	Guest(s)	Contestants	Round 1	Round 2	Overall
1	June 16, 2019	Find the actual women	Hearer: Cha Eun-woo (Astro)	1. **Kim Soon-hee**; 2. Kang Joon-hyuk; 3. **Shin Cho-yi**; 4. Choi Woo-sung; 5. Yoo Seung-woo	Failed (Note: Chosen #4)	Failed (Note: Chosen #3 and #5)	Hearers: ₩0; Contestants: ₩3,000,000
2	June 23, 2019	Find the actual Korean(s)	Hearers: Hong Ji-min, Seulgi (Red Velvet); Villain: Yang Jae-woong	1. **Ahn Hyung-joo**; 2. Anya Floris (Note: From United States); 3. Jyunky (Note: From China; currently a member of co-ed trio Walwari); 4. Taufiq Tamim (Note: From Bangladesh); 5. Laure Mafo (Note: From France)	Failed	Failed (Note: Chosen #1 and #5)	Hearers: ₩0; Contestants: ₩3,000,000
3	June 30, 2019	Find the actual adult(s)	Hearers: Kim Hyun-chul, Sunny (Girls' Generation)	1. Song Yoo-jin; 2. Kwak Yi-an; 3. **Shin Mi-rae**; 4. **Park Seul-gi**; 5. Ahn So-myeong	Failed (Note: Chosen #1)	Failed	Hearers: ₩0; Contestants: ₩3,000,000
4	July 7, 2019	Find the actual rapper(s)	Hearers: Kim Hyun-chul, Sunny (Girls' Generation)	1. Sojung (Ladies' Code); 2. **Giant Pink**; 3. Son Seung-yeon; 4. **Killagramz**; 5. **Ravi (VIXX)**	Succeed (Note: Chosen #2)	Succeed (Note: Chosen #4 and #5)	Hearers: ₩3,000,000; Contestants: ₩0
5	July 14, 2019	Find the actual original singer(s)	Hearers: Kim Jong-jin, Hong Ji-min, Lee Dae-hwi (AB6IX); Villain: Hong Hyun-hee	1. **Bobby Kim**; 2. Kim Jung-wook (Note: Imitating Yesung (Super Junior); singer-songwriter, cousin of Ryeowook (Super Junior)); 3. **Park Sang-min**; 4. Im Sung-hyun (Note: Imitating Jo Sung-mo; member of vocal group The Hidden); 5. Heo Young-saeng (SS501) (Note: Imitating Kim Kyung-ho)	Failed	Failed (Note: Chosen #3)	Hearers: ₩0; Contestants: ₩3,000,000
6	July 21, 2019	Find the actual trot singer(s)	Hearers: Kim Jong-jin, Choi Yoo-jung (Weki Meki); Villain: Hong Hyun-hee	1. **Seol Ha-yoon**; 2. Jo Bin (Norazo); 3. **Bae Il-ho**; 4. Ahn Ye-eun; 5. Kim Jae-seon	Succeed	Failed	Hearers: ₩1,000,000; Contestants: ₩2,000,000
7	July 28, 2019	Find the actual rock singer(s)	Hearers: Yoon Do-hyun (YB), Gummy, Solji (EXID)	1. Park Hyo-joo; 2. **Kim Tae-hoon**; 3. **Seomoon Tak**; 4. DK (December); 5. Jung Byung-hee	Succeed	Failed (Note: Chosen #5)	Hearers: ₩1,000,000; Contestants: ₩2,000,000
8	August 4, 2019	Find the actual vocalist(s)	Hearers: Yoon Do-hyun (YB), Gummy, Heo Young-ji	1. Baek A-yeon; 2. Lee Go-eun; 3. **Lee Byung-il**; 4. **Son Tae-jin**; 5. **Shin Dong-hyuk**	Succeed	Failed (Note: Chosen #2 and #3)	Hearers: ₩1,000,000; Contestants: ₩2,000,000

== Ratings ==
- Ratings listed below are the individual corner ratings of Super Hearer. (Note: Individual corner ratings do not include commercial time, which regular ratings include.)
- In the ratings below, the highest rating for the show will be in red and the lowest rating for the show will be in blue each year.

Ep. #	Original Airdate	AGB Nielsen Ratings Nationwide
1	June 16, 2019	1.773%
2	June 23, 2019	1.866%
3	June 30, 2019	1.618%
4	July 7, 2019	1.827%
5	July 14, 2019	1.740%
6	July 21, 2019	3.162%
7	July 28, 2019	1.769%
8	August 4, 2019	1.890%
