= Liver or Die =

2019 South Korean television series

- Promotional poster
- Hangul: 왜그래 풍상씨!
- Lit.: What's Wrong, Poong-sang!
- RR: Waegeurae Pungsangssi!
- MR: Waegŭrae P'ungsangssi!
- Genre: Drama; Family
- Developed by: KBS Drama Division
- Written by: Moon Young-nam
- Directed by: Jin Hyung-wook
- Starring: Yoo Jun-sang; Oh Ji-ho; Jeon Hye-bin; Lee Si-young; Cha Seo-won
- Music by: Gaemi
- Country of origin: South Korea
- Original language: Korean
- No. of episodes: 40 (Note: In order to circumvent Korean laws that prevent commercial breaks in the middle of an episode, what would previously have been aired as single 70 minute episodes are now being repackaged as two 35 minute episodes, with two episodes being shown each night with a commercial break between the two.)

Production
- Executive producers: Kim Sang-heon; Kim Hee-yeol
- Camera setup: Single-camera
- Running time: 35 minutes
- Production companies: Chorokbaem Media; Pan Entertainment
- Budget: ₩6.3 billion

Original release
- Network: KBS2
- Release: January 9 – March 14, 2019

Liver or Die (Korean: 왜그래 풍상씨!) is a 2019 South Korean television series starring Yoo Jun-sang, Oh Ji-ho, Jeon Hye-bin, Lee Si-young and Cha Seo-won. It aired from January 9 to March 14, 2019 on KBS2's Wednesdays and Thursdays at 22:00 (KST).

== Synopsis ==
The story of Lee Poong-sang, a married middle-aged man, always has to take care of his siblings, as they never received love from their parents.

== Cast ==
=== Main ===
- Yoo Jun-sang as Lee Poong-sang (47 years old)

The eldest brother and father figure of the family.

- Oh Ji-ho as Lee Jin-sang (42 years old)
  - Choi Seung-hoon as young Jin-sang

He is the second oldest sibling and is seen as the family's "lost cause".

- Jeon Hye-bin as Lee Jeong-sang (35 years old)

She is the older twin and a university hospital doctor.

- Lee Si-young as Lee Hwa-sang (35 years old)

She is the younger twin and is seen as the family's black sheep.

- Cha Seo-won as Lee Wi-sang (29 years old)

He is the youngest sibling. He couldn't realize his dream of becoming a professional baseball player.

=== Supporting ===
==== Other family members ====
- Shin Dong-mi as Kan Boon-shil (47 years old)

Poong-sang's wife.

- Lee Bo-hee as Noh Yang-shim (65 years old)

Poong-sang, Jin-sang, Jeong-sang, Hwa-sang and Wi-sang's mother.

- Park In-hwan as Kan Bo-koo (70 years old)

Boon-shil's father. He runs the laundry.

- Kim Ji-young as Lee Joong-yi (15 years old)

Poong-sang and Boon-shil's daughter.

==== Others ====
- Ki Eun-se as Jo Young-pil (35 years old), Jeong-sang's friend.
- Song Jong-ho as Jin Ji-ham (41 years old), Jeong-sang's senior at the hospital, he's a surgeon.
- Choi Sung-jae as Kang Yeol-han (35 years old), Jeong-sang's colleague and past lover.
- Lee Sang-sook as Jeon Dal-ja (60 years old), Super Woman from Chungcheong Province.
- Choi Dae-chul as Jun Chil-bok (42 years old), Super Son and Jin-sang's friend.
- Yoon Sun-woo as Yoo Heung-man, Lee Hwa-sang's ex-husband.
- Lee Hyun-woong as Chonam's CEO.
- Lee Myung-ho as Yang-shim's lover.
- Kim Kiri as Kye Sang-ki, Young-pil's past lover.
- Lee Ga-ryeong as Mi-ryeon's production company actress.
- Kim Kwang-young as a widower.
- Lee Hyo-bi as the widower's daughter.
- Ha Min as Su Sam University Hospital's director.
- Cheon Lee-seul as Han Shim-lan.
- Park Ha-joon as Young Ha-nam (12 years old).
- Kim Hyo-gyeong as Jin Se-mi, Ji-shin and Su-jin's daughter.

=== Special appearances ===
- Ha Jae-young as Lee Ju-gil (Poong-sang, Jin-sang, Jeong-sang, Hwa-sang and Wi-sang's father)
- Ahn Nae-sang
- Moon Hee-kyung
- Oh Hyun-kyung
- Hwang Dong-joo
- Heo Sung-tae (ep. #1)
- Byeon Jeong-min as Bae Soo-jin (Ji-ham's wife)

== Production ==
The first script reading took place on October 31, 2018 at KBS Annex Broadcasting Station in Yeouido, South Korea.

The series is the third collaboration between screenwriter Moon Young-nam and director Jin Hyung-wook after Three Brothers (2009–2010) and Wang's Family (2013-2014).

== Original soundtrack ==
Liver or Die OST

Soundtrack album by Various artists
- Released: 2019
- Genre: Soundtrack
- Languages: Korean; English
- Labels: Most Contents; NHN Bugs

=== Part 1 ===
Released on January 17, 2019
No.	Title	Artist	Length
1.	"Dream" (꿈)	Noel	4:17
2.	"Dream" (Inst.)		4:17
Total length:			8:34

=== Part 2 ===
Released on January 31, 2019
No.	Title	Artist	Length
1.	"I Buried The Pain" (묻어버린 아픔)	Monday Kiz	4:21
2.	"I Buried The Pain" (Inst.)		4:21
Total length:			8:42

=== Part 3 ===
Released on February 7, 2019
No.	Title	Artist	Length
1.	"You Are The Only One" (유일한 사람)	Kim Hyung-joong	3:31
2.	"You Are The Only One" (Inst.)		3:31
Total length:			7:02

=== Part 4 ===
Released on February 14, 2019
No.	Title	Artist	Length
1.	"Too Painful Love Was Not Love" (너무 아픈 사랑은 사랑이 아니었음을)	Park Sae-byul	4:44
2.	"Too Painful Love Was Not Love" (Inst.)		4:44
Total length:			9:28

=== Part 5 ===
Released on February 20, 2019
No.	Title	Artist	Length
1.	"Winter Flower" (겨울꽃)	Kim Na-yeon	4:03
2.	"Winter Flower" (Inst.)		4:03
Total length:			8:06

=== Part 6 ===
Released on February 27, 2019
No.	Title	Artist	Length
1.	"Memories" (추억 한 줌)	Huh Gak	4:37
2.	"Memories" (Inst.)		4:37
Total length:			9:14

=== Part 7 ===
Released on March 7, 2019
No.	Title	Artist	Length
1.	"Beautiful Day" (햇살이 눈부신 어느날)	Min Young-ki	4:31
2.	"Beautiful Day" (Inst.)		4:31
Total length:			9:02

=== Part 8 ===
Released on March 15, 2019
No.	Title	Artist	Length
1.	"I Am a Happy Man" (나는 행복한 사람)	Yoo Jun-sang	3:36
2.	"I Am a Happy Man" (Inst.)		3:36
Total length:			7:12

== Viewership ==
Liver or Die : South Korea viewers per episode (millions)

Season	Episode number									
Season	1	2	3	4	5	6	7	8	9	10
Ep.1-10	0.949	1.044	1.038	1.265	1.082	1.156	1.235	1.655	1.242	1.535
Ep.11-20	1.229	1.381	1.305	1.558	1.338	1.512	1.267	1.813	1.820	2.039
Ep.21-30	1.453	1.810	2.046	2.346	1.566	1.951	2.060	2.340	2.269	2.857
Ep.31-40	2.715	3.242	2.319	2.785	2.954	3.308	2.904	3.406	3.298	3.692

Source: Audience measurement performed nationwide by Nielsen Media Research.

Average TV viewership ratings
Ep.	Original broadcast date	Average audience share		
Ep.	Original broadcast date	TNmS	AGB Nielsen	
Ep.	Original broadcast date	Nationwide	Nationwide	Seoul
1	January 9, 2019	5.4%	5.9% (20th)	5.5% (NR)
2	January 9, 2019	5.8%	6.7% (15th)	6.4% (17th)
3	January 10, 2019	6.4%	6.5% (18th)	5.9% (19th)
4	January 10, 2019	7.5%	7.8% (13th)	7.4% (12th)
5	January 16, 2019	6.8%	6.4% (18th)	6.0% (NR)
6	January 16, 2019	6.7%	6.5% (17th)	6.1% (19th)
7	January 17, 2019	7.4%	8.1% (13th)	8.3% (12th)
8	January 17, 2019	8.4%	10.2% (8th)	10.3% (7th)
9	January 23, 2019	—N/a	7.5% (15th)	7.3% (16th)
10	January 23, 2019	6.7%	8.8% (10th)	8.6% (10th)
11	January 24, 2019	6.2%	7.0% (14th)	7.2% (14th)
12	January 24, 2019	7.2%	8.0% (13th)	8.2% (12th)
13	January 30, 2019	7.2%	8.1% (13th)	8.1% (12th)
14	January 30, 2019	7.8%	9.3% (8th)	8.9% (11th)
15	January 31, 2019	7.5%	8.4% (13th)	8.4% (10th)
16	January 31, 2019	8.9%	9.5% (8th)	8.9% (7th)
17	February 6, 2019	7.6%	7.8% (17th)	
18	February 6, 2019	10.7%	11.0% (6th)	11.4% (4th)
19	February 7, 2019	11.3%	11.8% (8th)	12.3% (6th)
20	February 7, 2019	12.4%	12.7% (5th)	12.8% (3rd)
21	February 13, 2019	8.6%	9.0% (9th)	8.8% (10th)
22	February 13, 2019	10.0%	11.0% (7th)	11.0% (6th)
23	February 14, 2019	12.0%	13.1% (5th)	14.0% (4th)
24	February 14, 2019	13.2%	14.8% (2nd)	15.4% (2nd)
25	February 20, 2019	10.5%	10.1% (9th)	10.1% (8th)
26	February 20, 2019	12.3%	12.3% (4th)	12.2% (3rd)
27	February 21, 2019	12.8%	12.7% (6th)	12.4% (5th)
28	February 21, 2019	14.5%	14.4% (3rd)	14.1% (3rd)
29	February 27, 2019	13.5%	14.2% (3rd)	14.2% (2nd)
30	February 27, 2019	16.3%	17.5% (1st)	17.8% (1st)
31	February 28, 2019	15.9%	17.0% (3rd)	17.4% (2nd)
32	February 28, 2019	18.4%	20.0% (1st)	20.7% (1st)
33	March 6, 2019	14.3%	15.2% (4th)	15.6% (3rd)
34	March 6, 2019	17.0%	18.1% (2nd)	18.5% (2nd)
35	March 7, 2019	19.2%	18.5% (3rd)	18.3% (3rd)
36	March 7, 2019	21.4%	20.4% (2nd)	20.3% (2nd)
37	March 13, 2019	17.3%	17.6% (3rd)	17.5% (3rd)
38	March 13, 2019	19.7%	20.4% (2nd)	20.1% (1st)
39	March 14, 2019	20.0%	20.5% (3rd)	20.8% (2nd)
40	March 14, 2019	22.8%	22.7% (1st)	22.8% (1st)
Average		– (Note: Due to some ratings not recorded, the exact average rating is unknown.)	12.2%	12.1%
In this table below, the blue numbers represent the lowest ratings and the red numbers represent the highest ratings.; NR denotes that the series did not rank in the top 20 daily programs on that date.; N/A denotes that the rating is not known.

== Awards and nominations ==
Year	Award	Category	Recipient	Result	Ref.
2019	12th Korea Drama Awards	Best New Actor	Choi Sung-jae	Nominated	
2019	KBS Drama Awards	Top Excellence Award, Actor	Yoo Jun-sang	Won	
2019	KBS Drama Awards	Excellence Award, Actor in a Mid-length Drama	Yoo Jun-sang	Nominated	
2019	KBS Drama Awards	Excellence Award, Actress in a Mid-length Drama	Lee Si-young	Won	
2019	KBS Drama Awards	Best Supporting Actor	Choi Dae-chul	Nominated	
2019	KBS Drama Awards	Best Supporting Actress	Shin Dong-mi	Won	
2019	KBS Drama Awards	Best New Actor	Cha Seo-won	Nominated	
2019	KBS Drama Awards	Netizen Award, Actor	Yoo Jun-sang	Nominated	
2019	KBS Drama Awards	Netizen Award, Actress	Jeon Hye-bin	Nominated	
2019	KBS Drama Awards	Netizen Award, Actress	Lee Si-young	Nominated	
2019	KBS Drama Awards	Netizen Award, Actress	Shin Dong-mi	Nominated	
2019	KBS Drama Awards	Best Couple Award	Yoo Jun-sang and Shin Dong-mi	Won	
2019	KBS Drama Awards	Best Couple Award	Lee Si-young and Jeon Hye-bin	Nominated	
2019	KBS Drama Awards	Best Couple Award	Lee Si-young and Choi Dae-chul	Nominated	

== Remake ==
- Vietnam: it is titled Cây táo nở hoa and currently airs on channel HTV2 (2021).
