= Mongolian Princess =

- Directed by: Danwoo Jung
- Written by: Danwoo Jung
- Produced by: Kuiock Park; Yong Jung
- Starring: Danwoo Jung; Elisabeth Garcia; Park Ha-na
- Cinematography: Shin Sang-chul
- Edited by: Kim Mi-young; Kim Da-won; Jo Hyo-jung; Kim Mi-sook
- Music by: Hong Ji-hyun
- Production company: Film JoseE Studio
- Release date: 19 March 2015
- Running time: 80 minutes
- Country: South Korea
- Languages: English; Korean

Mongolian Princess (Korean: 몽골리안 프린세스) is a 2015 South Korean romantic drama film directed, written by, and starring Danwoo Jung, along with Elisabeth Garcia and Park Ha-na.

== Plot ==
This series tell about a love story about people who just aren't that interesting, what real-life romance actually the only person to have ever gone through a forced love story.

One day, you fell from the sky.
I never knew loving somebody could bring so much happiness.
I see the world differently because of you.
I am a different person because you live in my heart.

Dan-Woo (played by Danwoo Jung) is a man in his mid-thirties who's been bumming most of his life around the international acting circuit and career path which is far less interesting than it sounds. He's never even had a serious girlfriend, but that changes when he meets Elisabeth (played by Elisabeth Garcia), a French writer.

Danwoo likes communicating with someone who doesn't make him feel like an idiot, while Elisabeth likes the attention. This is the entire basis of their relationship. However, they later break-up hardly after told Danwoo's flashback, as his current-day relationship with Ha-Na (played by Park Ha-na). Neither Elisabeth nor Ha-Na particularly wants to hurt Dan-woo's feelings, but it's only the latter woman who recognizes that Danwoo's long term needs sometimes necessitate her saying things he doesn't want to hear.

This is a sweet and moving story about people who try to use romance to escape loneliness, only to realize that an absence of loneliness isn't the same thing as happiness. Even a break-up isn't the end of the world, Danwoo did manage to meet Ha-Na after all. Even if this was less because Elisabeth taught him how to love as it was because Danwoo had the sense not to attempt that same mistake again.

== Cast ==
=== Main ===
- Danwoo Jung as Dan-Woo
- Elisabeth Garcia as Elisabeth
- Park Ha-na as Ha-Na

=== Supporting ===
- Lee Eun-sol as Eun-Sol
- Kim Sun-young as Ji-No
- Lusy Loke as Carol
- Lee Ji-eun as a music director
- Kang Eun-byul as a theater staff
- Lee Tae-kyung as a Film audience
- Daniel Kay as Alex
- Kinnis Peabe as Chris
- Khalid Taphia as Ma-Bin
- Michelle Oliver as Cassie
- Yoo Nan-hee as Michelle

=== Cameo ===
- Hong Suk-chun as a Film actor
- Kim Jong-soo as a Film actor
- Park Hye-jin as Ha-Na's mother
- Je Yi-jung as an English language teacher

== Original soundtrack ==
Mongolian Princess OST

Soundtrack album by: Fromm; Hong Ji-hyun; Choi Soo-yeon
- Released: March 18, 2015
- Genre: Soundtrack
- Length: 12:13
- Language: Korean; English
- Label: Mirrorball Music (미러볼뮤직)
- Producer: QuiXote (키호테)

No.	Title	Lyrics	Singer	Length
1.	"I Am Elisabeth" (Main Theme)		Hong Ji-hyun	1:24
2.	"What Is Your Favorite Color"		Hong Ji-hyun	1:25
3.	"The Perfect Weather To Snuggle Up"		Choi Soo-yeon	1:56
4.	"Even Before You Kissed Me"		Hong Ji-hyun	0:52
5.	"You Are Not A Fool"		Hong Ji-hyun	1:15
6.	"How Can I Be Your Friend"		Hong Ji-hyun	1:12
7.	"Do You Mind If I Look At You"	Danwoo Jung	Fromm	3:26
8.	"I Am Danwoo"		Hong Ji-hyun	0:49
Total length:				12:13
