= Vengeance of the Bride =

2022 South Korean television series

- Promotional poster
- Hangul: 태풍의 신부
- Hanja: 颱風의 新婦
- Lit.: Bride of the Typhoon
- RR: Taepungui sinbu
- MR: T'aep'ungŭi sinbu
- Genre: Melodrama; Revenge; Family; Romantic thriller
- Developed by: KBS Drama Division (Planning)
- Written by: Song Jeong-rim
- Directed by: Park Ki-hyun
- Music by: Choi In-hee
- Country of origin: South Korea
- Original language: Korean
- No. of episodes: 102

Production
- Executive producers: Lee Jeong-mi (KBS); Lee So-yeon (CP)
- Producers: Kim Dong-gu; Kim sang-heon
- Editor: Cheon Yun-young
- Running time: 30-35 minutes
- Production companies: DK E&M; Chorokbaem Media

Original release
- Network: KBS2
- Release: October 10, 2022 – March 9, 2023

Vengeance of the Bride (Korean: 태풍의 신부) is a 2022 South Korean television series starring Park Ha-na, Kang Ji-seub, Park Yoon-jae and Oh Seung-ah. It premiered on KBS2 on October 10, 2022.

== Synopsis ==
A desperate revenge story of a woman who becomes the daughter-in-law of an enemy in search of her biological mother.

== Cast ==
- Park Ha-na as Eun Seo-yeon
  - Lee Ah-ra as young Eun Seo-yeon / Kang Ba-ram - The protagonist of the story, Eun Seo-yeon is a naive makeup artist who is clueless about her own life. However, after realizing that Kang Baek-san killed her family, she will transform into a vengeful woman, pledging a bitter vengeance like a winter wind.
- Kang Ji-seop as Kang Tae-poong
  - Son Jun-hee as young Kang Tae-poong - Kang Baek-san's son who is trained to become the CEO of LeBlanc. Eun Seo-yeon will marry him as part of her vengeance.
- Park Yoon-jae as Yoon San-deu - Eun Seo-yeon's childhood friend and lover who will become a victim of Kang Baek-san's evilness.
- Oh Seung-ah as Kang Ba-da - Kang Ba-da is the ruthless and evil chaebol who is full of insecurities and jealousy. Since she was a child, she harbors enmity to Ba-ram. She loves San-deul so much that she is willing to kill and commit heinous acts especially to Eun Seo-yeon.
- Choi Young-wan as Bae Soon-young
- Son Chang-min as Kang Baek-san - Ba-da and Tae-poong's heartless father. He is the main antagonist of the story. He plotted to kill Ba-ram's father to steal his wealth and company. He is blinded for his obsession to power and money that he is willing to hurt his children to hide his crimes.
- Ji Soo-won as Jeong Mo-yeon - Eun Seo-yeon's biological mother who suffers from amnesia.
- Kim Young-ok as Park Yong-ja
- Choi Su-rin as Nam In-soon - Kang Baek-san's arrogant and paranoid wife.
- Bae Geu-rin as Hong Jo-yi - Jeong Mo-yeon's wealthy daughter who works as a reporter. Originally kind and caring, but her unhealthy obsession to Tae-poong and jealousy to Eun Seo-yeon will drive her to plot evil schemes against her mother and Ba-ram's real identity.
- Joo Ji-won as Seo Yoon-hee
- Kim Kwang-young as Na Kwang-pil
- Kim Hye-sun
- Ahn So-jin as Gang Ba-lan
- Cha Kwang-soo as Ma Dae-geun
- Choi Young-wan as Bae Soon-young
- Cha Seung-woo as Cha Wi-dae

=== Special appearances ===
- Nam Sung-jin as Jin Il-suk
- Im Ho as Yoon Jae-ha

== Production ==
The series brings together writer Song Jeong-rim and actress Park Ha-na after three years of Love in Sadness 2019. On September 14, 2022, it was confirmed that Kang Ji-sub, Park Yoon-jae will be joining the series. The first reading of the script of the series was held at KBS headquarters on September 20, 2022, in presence of the cast and production staff.

=== Release ===
On September 19, 2022, KBS released the first teaser for the series, along with announcing the premiere date. The series premiered on October 10, 2022.

== Viewership ==
Vengeance of the Bride : South Korea viewers per episode (millions)

Episodes	Episode number																			
Episodes	1	2	3	4	5	6	7	8	9	10	11	12	13	14	15	16	17	18	19	20
1–20	2.086	2.051	1.980	2.203	2.153	2.337	2.053	2.219	2.071	2.220	2.169	2.185	2.238	2.151	2.181	2.233	2.019	2.132	2.211	2.231
21–40	2.146	2.223	2.284	2.323	2.340	2.183	2.141	2.294	2.312	2.152	2.302	2.335	2.225	2.116	2.313	2.359	2.200	2.348	2.216	2.366
41–60	2.388	2.309	2.326	2.298	2.420	2.426	2.195	2.544	2.320	2.299	2.370	2.296	2.435	2.363	2.683	2.514	2.402	2.500	2.326	2.426
61–80	2.417	2.260	2.303	2.436	2.525	2.603	2.407	2.356	2.345	2.820	2.408	2.491	2.457	2.491	2.459	2.356	2.602	2.456	2.554	2.582
81–100	2.511	2.490	2.617	2.650	2.554	2.320	2.425	2.376	2.599	2.532	2.399	2.513	2.362	2.570	2.484	2.398	2.482	2.409	2.394	2.560
101-102	2.485	2.528	–																	

Source: Audience measurement performed nationwide by Nielsen Korea.

Ep.	Original broadcast date	Average audience share		
Ep.	Original broadcast date	Nielsen Korea		TNmS
Ep.	Original broadcast date	Nationwide	Seoul	Nationwide
1	October 10, 2022	12.8% (2nd)	11.0% (2nd)	13.1% (2nd)
2	October 11, 2022	12.2% (2nd)	10.4% (2nd)	13.8% (2nd)
3	October 12, 2022	11.4% (2nd)	9.6% (2nd)	12.4% (2nd)
4	October 13, 2022	12.9% (2nd)	10.4% (2nd)	12.2% (2nd)
5	October 14, 2022	12.3% (3rd)	10.3% (3rd)	13.7% (2nd)
6	October 18, 2022	13.7% (2nd)	11.4% (2nd)	14.6% (2nd)
7	October 19, 2022	12.4% (2nd)	10.6% (2nd)	13.5% (2nd)
8	October 20, 2022	13.3% (2nd)	11.0% (2nd)	13.0% (2nd)
9	October 21, 2022	12.4% (2nd)	10.2% (2nd)	13.2% (2nd)
10	October 24, 2022	13.2% (2nd)	10.5% (2nd)	13.5% (2nd)
11	October 25, 2022	12.8% (2nd)	10.4% (2nd)	13.7% (2nd)
12	October 26, 2022	12.5% (2nd)	10.2% (2nd)	12.5% (2nd)
13	October 28, 2022	12.6% (2nd)	10.2% (2nd)	12.7% (2nd)
14	October 31, 2022	12.3% (1st)	10.6% (1st)	12.5% (1st)
15	November 2, 2022	12.8% (2nd)	11.2% (2nd)	12.3% (2nd)
16	November 3, 2022	13.6% (2nd)	12.3% (2nd)	13.0% (2nd)
17	November 4, 2022	12.2% (2nd)	9.6% (2nd)	13.1% (2nd)
18	November 7, 2022	12.8% (2nd)	10.4% (2nd)	12.8% (2nd)
19	November 8, 2022	13.3% (2nd)	11.0% (2nd)	13.3% (2nd)
20	November 9, 2022	13.2% (2nd)	10.8% (2nd)	11.9% (2nd)
21	November 10, 2022	13.0% (2nd)	10.1% (2nd)	12.6% (2nd)
22	November 11, 2022	13.1% (3rd)	11.0% (3rd)	N/A
23	November 14, 2022	13.9% (2nd)	11.5% (2nd)	14.1% (2nd)
24	November 15, 2022	13.6% (2nd)	11.3% (2nd)	13.9% (2nd)
25	November 16, 2022	13.7% (2nd)	11.9% (2nd)	13.0% (2nd)
26	November 17, 2022	13.0% (2nd)	10.7% (2nd)	12.3% (2nd)
27	November 18, 2022	12.8% (2nd)	11.1% (2nd)	13.6% (2nd)
28	November 21, 2022	13.5% (2nd)	11.5% (2nd)	14.3% (2nd)
29	November 23, 2022	13.7% (2nd)	12.2% (2nd)	12.2% (2nd)
30	November 25, 2022	13.2% (2nd)	11.4% (2nd)	12.5% (2nd)
31	November 29, 2022	13.2% (2nd)	10.6% (2nd)	N/A
32	November 30, 2022	13.3% (2nd)	11.4% (2nd)	N/A
33	December 1, 2022	13.3% (2nd)	11.5% (2nd)	N/A
34	December 2, 2022	12.6% (3rd)	11.1% (4th)	13.7% (2nd)
35	December 5, 2022	13.8% (2nd)	11.7% (2nd)	14.0% (2nd)
36	December 6, 2022	13.9% (2nd)	11.8% (2nd)	14.5% (2nd)
37	December 7, 2022	13.0% (2nd)	10.9% (2nd)	13.7% (2nd)
38	December 8, 2022	14.2% (2nd)	12.3% (2nd)	13.8% (2nd)
39	December 9, 2022	13.4% (2nd)	10.9% (2nd)	14.0% (2nd)
40	December 12, 2022	14.2% (2nd)	12.1% (2nd)	14.1% (2nd)
41	December 13, 2022	14.5% (2nd)	12.4% (2nd)	15.5% (2nd)
42	December 14, 2022	13.5% (2nd)	10.9% (2nd)	13.9% (2nd)
43	December 15, 2022	14.4% (2nd)	12.1% (2nd)	14.6% (2nd)
44	December 16, 2022	13.9% (2nd)	11.4% (2nd)	14.2% (2nd)
45	December 19, 2022	14.6% (2nd)	12.0% (2nd)	14.1% (2nd)
46	December 20, 2022	14.7% (2nd)	12.5% (2nd)	14.1% (2nd)
47	December 21, 2022	14.0% (2nd)	11.4% (2nd)	14.4% (2nd)
48	December 22, 2022	15.4% (2nd)	12.8% (2nd)	17.1% (2nd)
49	December 23, 2022	14.0% (2nd)	11.7% (2nd)	16.6% (2nd)
50	December 26, 2022	14.2% (2nd)	11.9% (2nd)	15.3% (2nd)
51	December 27, 2022	14.3% (2nd)	12.1% (2nd)	N/A
52	December 28, 2022	14.0% (2nd)	11.5% (2nd)	15.2% (2nd)
53	December 29, 2022	14.8% (2nd)	12.7% (2nd)	13.6% (2nd)
54	December 30, 2022	13.9% (2nd)	11.9% (2nd)	14.5% (2nd)
55	January 2, 2023	15.2% (2nd)	12.9% (2nd)	15.7% (2nd)
56	January 3, 2023	15.1% (2nd)	12.6% (2nd)	14.8% (2nd)
57	January 4, 2023	14.1% (2nd)	11.8% (2nd)	14.5% (2nd)
58	January 5, 2023	15.1% (2nd)	12.5% (2nd)	14.0% (2nd)
59	January 6, 2023	13.6% (2nd)	11.0% (2nd)	14.3% (2nd)
60	January 9, 2023	15.1% (2nd)	12.6% (2nd)	15.8% (2nd)
61	January 10, 2023	14.4% (2nd)	11.9% (2nd)	16.3% (2nd)
62	January 11, 2023	13.2% (2nd)	10.8% (2nd)	15.3% (2nd)
63	January 12, 2023	13.7% (2nd)	11.3% (2nd)	14.5% (2nd)
64	January 13, 2023	14.3% (2nd)	12.3% (2nd)	14.6% (2nd)
65	January 16, 2023	14.5% (2nd)	12.6% (2nd)	14.5% (2nd)
66	January 17, 2023	14.9% (2nd)	12.9% (2nd)	15.1% (2nd)
67	January 18, 2023	13.8% (2nd)	11.8% (2nd)	14.0% (2nd)
68	January 19, 2023	14.3% (2nd)	12.2% (2nd)	14.9% (2nd)
69	January 20, 2023	13.7% (2nd)	11.5% (2nd)	14.9% (2nd)
70	January 24, 2023	14.9% (2nd)	12.3% (3rd)	14.8% (2nd)
71	January 25, 2023	14.5% (2nd)	12.2% (2nd)	15.1% (2nd)
72	January 26, 2023	14.5% (2nd)	11.9% (2nd)	15.3% (2nd)
73	January 27, 2023	13.8% (2nd)	11.1% (3rd)	N/A
74	January 30, 2023	14.3% (2nd)	12.1% (2nd)	16.1% (2nd)
75	January 31, 2023	14.2% (2nd)	12.3% (2nd)	15.6% (2nd)
76	February 1, 2023	13.6% (2nd)	11.2% (2nd)	14.8% (2nd)
77	February 2, 2023	15.7% (2nd)	13.6% (2nd)	16.3% (2nd)
78	February 3, 2023	14.4% (2nd)	11.7% (2nd)	15.0% (2nd)
79	February 6, 2023	14.8% (2nd)	13.3% (2nd)	15.6% (2nd)
80	February 7, 2023	14.5% (2nd)	11.7% (2nd)	15.1% (2nd)
81	February 8, 2023	14.5% (2nd)	11.9% (2nd)	15.5% (2nd)
82	February 9, 2023	14.4% (2nd)	12.3% (2nd)	14.8% (2nd)
83	February 10, 2023	14.9% (2nd)	12.7% (2nd)	16.5% (2nd)
84	February 13, 2023	14.7% (2nd)	11.7% (2nd)	14.5% (2nd)
85	February 14, 2023	14.5% (2nd)	12.1% (2nd)	14.0% (2nd)
86	February 15, 2023	13.8% (2nd)	11.3% (2nd)	15.8% (2nd)
87	February 16, 2023	14.1% (2nd)	11.8% (2nd)	14.9% (2nd)
88	February 17, 2023	13.5% (2nd)	12.0% (3rd)	13.7% (2nd)
89	February 20, 2023	14.7% (2nd)	12.3% (2nd)	16.0% (2nd)
90	February 21, 2023	14.0% (2nd)	11.7% (2nd)	14.7% (2nd)
91	February 22, 2023	13.9% (2nd)	11.4% (2nd)	14.1% (2nd)
92	February 23, 2023	14.4% (2nd)	12.1% (2nd)	14.8% (2nd)
93	February 24, 2023	13.7% (2nd)	11.4% (3rd)	14.2% (2nd)
94	February 27, 2023	14.6% (2nd)	12.9% (2nd)	14.6% (2nd)
95	February 28, 2023	14.5% (2nd)	12.4% (2nd)	15.4% (2nd)
96	March 1, 2023	13.0% (2nd)	10.2% (2nd)	14.6% (2nd)
97	March 2, 2023	13.9% (2nd)	11.7% (2nd)	14.0% (2nd)
98	March 3, 2023	13.9% (2nd)	11.8% (2nd)	N/A
99	March 6, 2023	14.3% (2nd)	12.3% (2nd)	14.9% (2nd)
100	March 7, 2023	14.4% (2nd)	11.7% (2nd)	15.7% (2nd)
101	March 8, 2023	14.4% (2nd)	11.9% (2nd)	14.4% (2nd)
102	March 9, 2023	14.5% (2nd)	12.5% (2nd)	15.5% (2nd)
Average		13.8%	11.6%	— (Note: Due to some ratings not recorded, the exact average rating is unknown.)
In the table above, the blue numbers represent the lowest ratings and the red numbers represent the highest ratings.; N/A denotes that the rating is not known.

== Awards and nominations ==
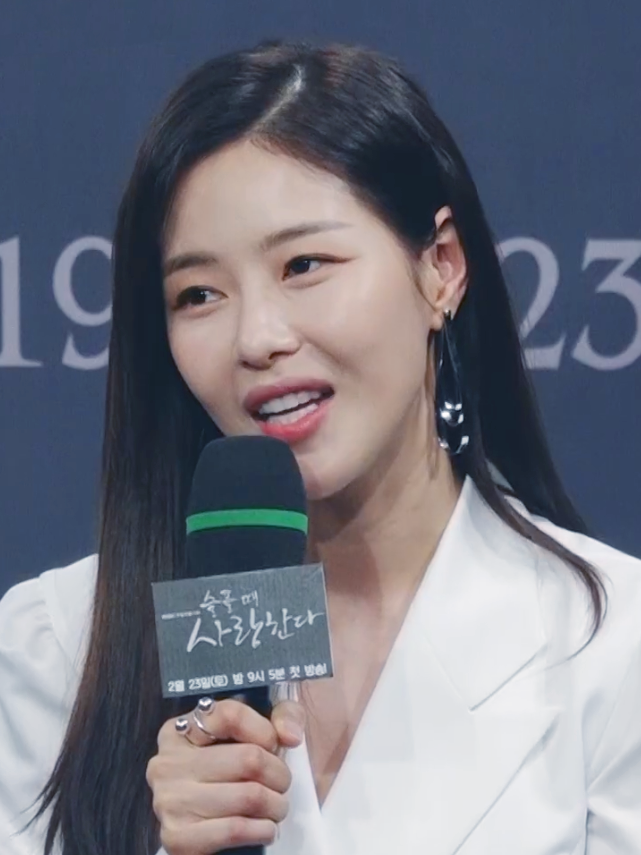
Park Ha-na, winner of Excellence Award, Actress

Name of the award ceremony, year presented, category, nominee of the award, and the result of the nomination
Award ceremony	Year	Category	Recipient	Result	Ref.
KBS Drama Awards	2022	Excellence Award, Actress in a Daily Drama	Park Ha-na	Won	
KBS Drama Awards	2022	Top Excellence Award, Actress	Park Ha-na	Nominated	
KBS Drama Awards	2022	Best Young Actress	Lee A-ra	Nominated	
