= 8th APAN Star Awards =

2022 edition of award ceremony

- Official poster
- Date: September 29, 2022
- Site: Korea International Exhibition Center (KINTEX), Western Ilsan District, Goyang, Gyeonggi Province
- Presented by: Korea Entertainment Management Association; Studio M1
- Hosted by: Kwon Yu-ri; Jung Il-woo

Highlights
- Most awards: The Red Sleeve (3)
- Most nominations: Squid Game (8)
- Grand Prize: Song Joong-ki
- Drama of the Year: The Red Sleeve
- Website: APAN Star Awards

Television/radio coverage
- Network: tvN; Naver Now

The 8th APAN Star Awards ceremony took place on September 29, 2022, at Korea International Exhibition Center, Western Ilsan District, Goyang, Gyeonggi Province. Hosted by Kwon Yu-ri and Jung Il-woo, it was held face-to-face for the first time in two years. The 2022 awards recognised the excellence in South Korea's television, including terrestrial, cable, OTT, and web dramas, aired from March 2021 to July 2022. Starting from this edition, another category for OTT dramas was introduced.

== Winners and nominees ==
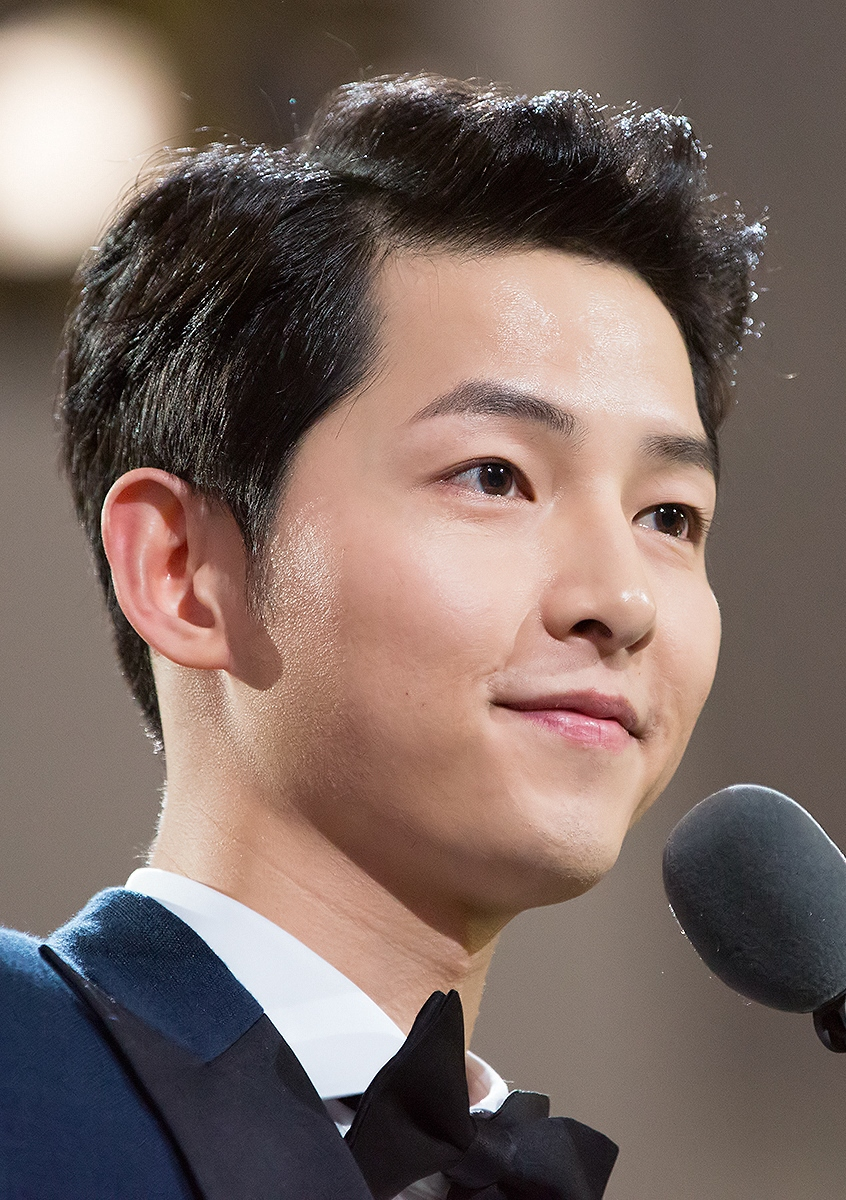
Song Joong-ki, winner of Grand Prize

- Winners are listed first, highlighted in **boldface**.

Source: Nominees

**Grand Prize (Daesang)**: **Song Joong-ki — Vincenzo**	**Drama of the Year**: **The Red Sleeve** (MBC) †; My Liberation Notes (JTBC); Squid Game (Netflix); Extraordinary Attorney Woo (ENA); Our Blues (tvN)
**Best Web Drama**: **Be My Boyfriend** (Naver TV Cast); Mad for Each Other (KakaoTV, Netflix); Heart.zip; Would You Like a Cup of Coffee? (KakaoTV); Blue Birthday (Naver TV)	**Best Short Drama**: **Deok-gu Is Back (tvN)**; XX+XY (tvN); Shared Office Hookup (tvN); Finding a Child (tvN); Hee-soo (KBS2)
**Best Director**: **Jung Ji-in and Song Yeon-hwa — The Red Sleeve**; Kim Hee-won — Vincenzo; Yoo In-shik — Extraordinary Attorney Woo; Han Jun-hee — D.P.; Hwang Dong-hyuk — Squid Game	**Best Screenwriter**: **Moon Ji-won — Extraordinary Attorney Woo**; Kim Min-seok — Juvenile Justice; Noh Hee-kyung — Our Blues; Park Hae-young — My Liberation Notes; Jung Hae-ri — The Red Sleeve
**Top Excellence Award, Actor in a Miniseries**: **Lee Jun-ho — The Red Sleeve**; Lee Je-hoon — Taxi Driver; Song Joong-ki — Vincenzo; Kim Nam-gil — Through the Darkness; Namkoong Min — The Veil	**Top Excellence Award, Actress in a Miniseries**: **Shin Min-a — Hometown Cha-Cha-Cha & Our Blues**; Kim Tae-ri — Twenty-Five Twenty-One; Park Eun-bin — Extraordinary Attorney Woo & The King's Affection; Seo Hyun-jin — Why Her; Honey Lee — One the Woman
**Excellence Award, Actor in a Miniseries**: **Jin Seon-kyu — Through the Darkness**; Rowoon — The King's Affection; Son Suk-ku — My Liberation Notes; Ahn Hyo-seop — Lovers of the Red Sky & Business Proposal; Choi Woo-shik — Our Beloved Summer	**Excellence Award, Actress in a Miniseries**: **Yoo Sun — Eve**; Kim Se-jeong — Business Proposal; Kim Ji-won — My Liberation Notes; Shin Hyun-been — Hospital Playlist 2 & Reflection of You; Lee Se-young — The Red Sleeve
**Top Excellence Award, Actor in a Serial Drama**: **Joo Sang-wook — The King of Tears, Lee Bang-won**; Um Ki-joon — The Penthouse: War in Life; Yoon Shi-yoon — It's Beautiful Now; Lee Tae-gon — Love (ft. Marriage and Divorce); Ji Hyun-woo — Young Lady and Gentleman	**Top Excellence Award, Actress in a Serial Drama**: **Park Jin-hee — The King of Tears, Lee Bang-won**; Kim So-yeon — The Penthouse: War in Life; Park Joo-mi — Love (ft. Marriage and Divorce); Uhm Hyun-kyung — The Second Husband; Choi Myung-gil — Red Shoes
**Excellence Award, Actor in a Serial Drama**: **Han Sang-jin — The All-Round Wife**; Kang Eun-tak — Young Lady and Gentleman; Kim Kyung-nam — Revolutionary Sisters; Oh Min-suk — It's Beautiful Now; Cha Seo-won — The Second Husband	**Excellence Award, Actress in a Serial Drama**: **So Yi-hyun — Red Shoes**; Park Ha-na — Young Lady and Gentleman; Shin Dong-mi — It's Beautiful Now; Han Da-gam — The All-Round Wife; Lee Ga-ryeong — Love (ft. Marriage and Divorce)
**Top Excellence Award, Actor in an OTT Drama**: **Jung Hae-in — D.P.**; Kim Soo-hyun — One Ordinary Day; Yoo Ah-in — Hellbound; Lee Jung-jae — Squid Game; Im Si-wan — Tracer	**Top Excellence Award, Actress in an OTT Drama**: **Kim Sung-ryung — Political Fever**; Kim Go-eun — Yumi's Cells; Kim Hye-soo — Juvenile Justice; Bae Suzy — Anna; Han So-hee — My Name
**Excellence Award, Actor in an OTT Drama**: **Ahn Bo-hyun — Yumi's Cells & My Name**; Koo Kyo-hwan — D.P.; Park Jung-min — Hellbound; Park Hae-soo — Squid Game; O Yeong-su — Squid Game	**Excellence Award, Actress in an OTT Drama**: **Han Sun-hwa — Work Later, Drink Now**; Kim Hyun-joo — Hellbound; Lee Yoo-mi — Squid Game & All of Us Are Dead; Lee Jung-eun — Juvenile Justice; Jung Eun-chae — Anna
**Best Supporting Actor**: **Heo Sung-tae — Squid Game**; **Yoon Byung-hee — Vincenzo & Our Blues**; Park Ji-hwan — Our Blues; Choi Young-joon — Our Blues; Yoon Kyung-ho — My Name	**Best Supporting Actress**: **Kim Shin-rok — Hellbound**; **Baek Ji-won — Extraordinary Attorney Woo & Anna**; Kim Ji-hyun — Thirty-Nine; Lee El — My Liberation Notes; Cha Ji-yeon — Taxi Driver
**Best New Actor**: **Yoon Chan-young — All of Us Are Dead**; **Tang Jun-sang — Move to Heaven & Racket Boys**; Kang Young-seok — Military Prosecutor Doberman & Insider; Park Seo-ham — Semantic Error; Choi Hyun-wook — Racket Boys & Twenty-Five Twenty-One	**Best New Actress**: **Park Ji-hu — All of Us Are Dead**; Roh Yoon-seo — Our Blues; Jung Ho-yeon — Squid Game; Cho Yi-hyun — School 2021 & All of Us Are Dead; Choi Sung-eun — Beyond Evil
**Best Couple**: **Park Seo-ham & Park Jae-chan — Semantic Error**; Park Eun-bin & Kang Tae-oh — Extraordinary Attorney Woo; Kim Woo-bin & Han Ji-min — Our Blues; Kim Go-eun & Park Jin-young — Yumi's Cells; Son Suk-ku & Kim Ji-won — My Liberation Notes; Ahn Hyo-seop & Kim Se-jeong — Business Proposal; Song Joong-ki & Jeon Yeo-been — Vincenzo; Lee Jun-ho & Lee Se-young — The Red Sleeve; Jung Il-woo & Kwon Yu-ri — Bossam: Steal the Fate; Choi Woo-shik & Kim Da-mi — Our Beloved Summer	**Best Original Soundtrack**: **Lim Young-woong — "Love Always Runs Away" (Young Lady and Gentleman OST)**; DK (Seventeen) — "Go!" (Twenty-Five Twenty-One OST); MeloMance — "Love, Maybe" (Business Proposal OST); V (BTS) — "Christmas Tree" (Our Beloved Summer OST); Kang Daniel — "Hush Hush (Korean Ver.)" (Rookie Cops OST); Wonstein — "Tuning In To You" (Extraordinary Attorney Woo OST); Lee Mu-jin — "Sweet" (Business Proposal OST); Jimin (BTS) X Ha Sung-woon — "With You" (Our Blues OST); Jihyo (Twice) — "Stardust Love Song" (Twenty-Five Twenty-One OST); Taeil (NCT) — "Starlight" (Twenty-Five Twenty-One OST)
**Popularity Star Award, Actor**: **Park Jae-chan — Semantic Error**; Kim Soo-hyun — One Ordinary Day; Rowoon — The King's Affection; Son Suk-ku — My Liberation Notes; Ahn Hyo-seop — Lovers of the Red Sky; Yoo Ah-in — Hellbound; Lee Jun-ho — The Red Sleeve; Im Si-wan — Tracer; Jung Il-woo — Bossam: Steal the Fate	**Popularity Star Award, Actress**: **Park Eun-bin — Extraordinary Attorney Woo**; Kwon Yu-ri — Bossam: Steal the Fate; Kim Go-eun — Yumi's Cells; Kim Se-jeong — Business Proposal; Kim Tae-ri — Twenty-Five Twenty-One; Bae Suzy — Anna; Shin Min-a — Hometown Cha-Cha-Cha; Lee Se-young — The Red Sleeve; Jung Ho-yeon — Squid Game; Han So-hee — My Name
**Global Star Award**: **Ji Chang-wook — The Sound of Magic**	**K-pop Label Award**: **Konnect Entertainment**

== Performers ==
- Kang Daniel
- Yuju
- Chancellor

== See also ==
- APAN Music Awards
- 7th APAN Star Awards
