= Cha Seo-won =

South Korean actor (born 1991)

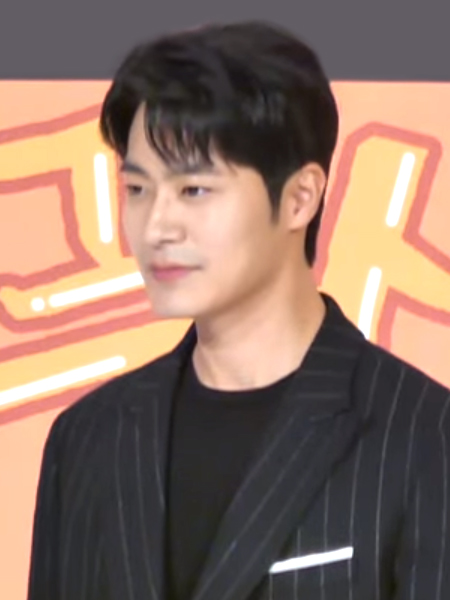
- Cha in January 2019
- Born: Lee Chang-yeob; April 15, 1991 (age 35); Busan, South Korea
- Education: Korea National University of Arts
- Occupation: Actor
- Years active: 2013–present
- Agent: Namoo Actors
- Spouse: Uhm Hyun-kyung (m. 2024)
- Children: 1

Korean name
- Hangul: 이창엽
- RR: I Changyeop
- MR: I Ch'angyŏp

Stage name
- Hangul: 차서원
- RR: Cha Seowon
- MR: Ch'a Sŏwŏn

Lee Chang-yeob (Korean: 이창엽; born April 15, 1991), known by his stage name Cha Seo-won (차서원), is a South Korean actor. His breakthrough role was in The Second Husband (2022), where he won his first acting award. He has also been a cast member of the variety show I Live Alone since 2022.

== Personal life ==
=== Military service ===
Cha enlisted for his mandatory military service as an active-duty soldier on November 22, 2022. In December 2022, he sustained a minor finger injury at the training center but resumed training after treatment. On May 21, 2024, Cha was officially discharged from the military.

=== Marriage and family ===
On June 5, 2023, it was announced that Cha's fiancée, actress Uhm Hyun-kyung, was pregnant, and that they planned to marry in May of the following year. They met while filming Second Husband. On October 16, 2023, Uhm gave birth to a son.

== Filmography ==
=== Film ===
Year	Title	Role	Notes	Ref.
2013	Tenderly Crunch	Da Yi Jae	Short film	
2018	A Boy and Sungreen	Doctor		
2022	Decision to Leave	Mr. Ryu	Bit part	

=== Television series ===
Year	Title	Role	Notes	Ref.
2013	The Heirs			
2015	Miss Mamma Mia			
2017	Sisters-in-Law	Choi Dong-joo		
2017	Children of the 20th Century	Lee Dong-hoon		
2018	The Rich Son	Choi Yong		
2019	Liver or Die	Lee Wi-sang		
2019	Miss Lee	Park Do-joon		
2021	The Second Husband	Yoon Jae-min		
2023	Our Blooming Youth	Jang-eui	Cameo (episode 12)	
2026	Spring Fever	Choi Yi-jun		
2026	The Wonderfools	Gu Jun-mo		

=== Web series ===
Year	Title	Role	Ref.
2023	Unintentional Love Story	Yoon Tae-joon	

=== Television shows ===
Year	Title	Role	Notes	Ref.
2022	I Live Alone	Cast Member	Episodes 455–472	
2022	If I Go Once	Cast Member		
2025	The Gentlemen's League 4	Cast Member		

== Theater ==
Year	Title	Role	Ref.
2022	Charmi (차미)	Oh Jin-hyuk	

== Discography ==
=== Soundtrack appearances ===
Title	Year	Album	Ref.
"What's in Life"	2021	Second Husband OST	
"Shalala"	2022	Second Husband OST	
"Beautiful day"	2023	Unintentional Love Story OST	

== Ambassadorship ==
- Korean Red Cross blood donation ambassador (2022)

== Awards and nominations ==
Name of the award ceremony, year presented, category, nominee of the award, and the result of the nomination
Award ceremony	Year	Category	Nominee / Work	Result	Ref.
APAN Star Awards	2022	Excellence Award, Actor in a Serial Drama	The Second Husband	Nominated	
KBS Drama Awards	2019	Best New Actor	Liver or Die	Nominated	
MBC Drama Awards	2021	Top Excellence Award, Actor in a Daily Drama	The Second Husband	Won	
