= Park Ha-na =

South Korean actress (born 1985)

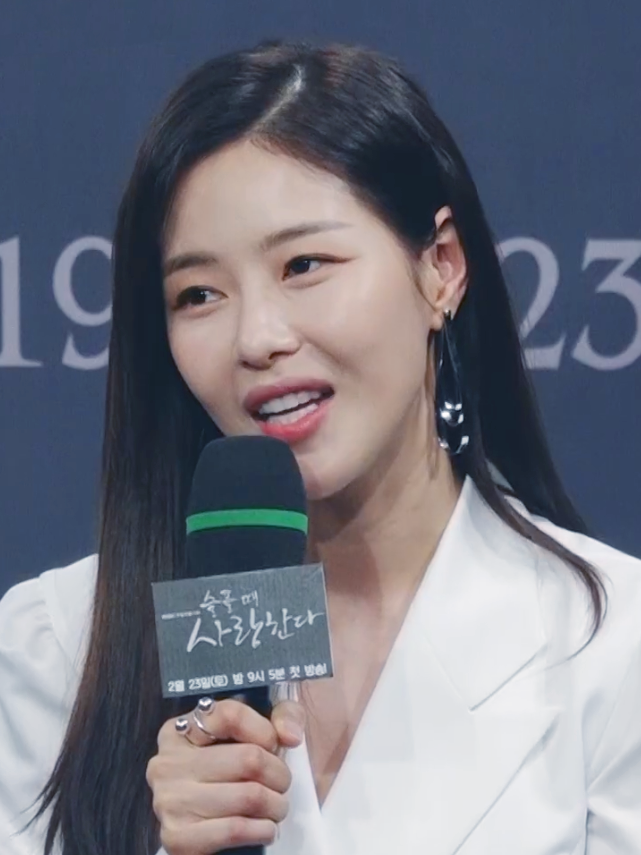
- Park in February 2019
- Born: July 25, 1985 (age 41); Buyeo County, South Chungcheong Province, South Korea
- Education: Paekche Institute of the Arts
- Occupation: Actress
- Years active: 2003–present
- Agent: FN Entertainment (Note: formerly Hanyang E&M)
- Spouse: Kim Tae-sool (m. 2025)

Korean name
- Hangul: 박하나
- RR: Bak Hana
- MR: Pak Hana

Park Ha-na (Korean: 박하나; born July 25, 1985) is a South Korean actress. Park made her entertainment debut in 2003 as a member of the idol group FUNNY. Since then, she has turned to acting and was in the lead role in Apgujeong Midnight Sun (2014).

== Career ==
In 2016, Ha-na played the villainous and psychotic Jang Se-jin in the daily drama melodrama The Promise. After that, she appeared in the daily drama Still Loving You as the evil and spoiled heiress Kim Bit-na.

In 2018, she began appearing as the protagonist Hong Se-yeon in Mysterious Personal Shopper. In 2020, she starred as the lead female in Fatal Promise.

== Personal life ==
On February 11, 2025, FN Entertainment confirmed that Park would marry basketball coach Kim Tae-sool in June. The couple married on June 21, 2025, in Seoul.

== Filmography ==
=== Film ===
Year	Title	Role	Notes	Ref.
2012	Love Fiction	Flight attendant 1		
2013	Steal My Heart	Lee Ho-tae's house delivery woman		
2015	Mongolian Princess	Ha-Na		
2022	Devil in the lake	Bo-young	Film Television	

=== Television series ===
Year	Title	Role	Ref.
2012	12 Signs of Love		
2012	Miss Panda and Mr. Hedgehog	Park Ha-na	
2013	Pure Love	Jong sun-jeong's sister	
2013	Two Weeks	Jang Young-ja	
2013	Miss Korea	Han So-jin	
2013	Empress Ki	Woo-hee	
2014	Apgujeong Midnight Sun	Baek Ya (Baek Seon-dong)	
2015	KBS Drama Special: "Red Moon"	Lady Hyegyŏng	
2016	The Promise	Jang Se-jin	
2016	KBS Drama Special: "Home Sweet Home"	Son Ji-ah	
2016	Still Loving You	Kim Bit-na	
2017	Girls' Generation 1979	Hong Do-hwa	
2017	Unexpected Heroes	No Deul-hee	
2018	Mysterious Personal Shopper	Hong Se-yeon	
2018	My Only One	Sung Soo-hyun	
2019	Love in Sadness	Yoon Ma-ri	
2019	Different Dreams	Cha Jeong-im	
2019	The Great Show	Kim Hye-jin	
2020	Fatal Promise	Cha Eun-dong	
2020	Mystic Pop-up Bar	Song Mi-ran	
2021	Young Lady and Gentleman	Jo Sa-ra	
2021	KBS Drama Special: "Hee-soo"	Kim Sang-mi	
2022	Vengeance of the Bride	Eun Seo-yeon	
2022	KBS Drama Special: "Devil in the Lake"	Bo-young	
2024	My Merry Marriage	Maeng Gong-hee	

=== Web series ===
Year	Title	Role	Notes	Ref.
2022	The Sound of Magic	Min Ji-soo	Special appearance	

=== Television shows ===
Year	Title	Role	Notes	Ref.
2017–2020	Rumor Has It	Host		
2022	World Dark Tour	Host		
2023–present	Goal Girl	Cast Member	Season 4	

=== Music video appearances ===
Year	Song title	Artist	Ref.
2008	"Not Young"	U-KISS	
2011	"Although A Bit Far"	Park Min-hye (Big Mama) & QueenBee	
2012	"Mr. Crazy"	Cold Cherry	

== Discography ==
=== Soundtrack appearances ===
Title	Year	Album
"Love Stops"	2012	Miss Panda and Mr. Hedgehog OST

== Awards and nominations ==
Name of the award ceremony, year presented, category, nominee of the award, and the result of the nomination
Award ceremony	Year	Category	Nominee / Work	Result	Ref.
APAN Star Awards	2022	Excellence Award, Actress in a Serial Drama	Young Lady and Gentleman	Nominated	
Asia Model Awards	2015	New Star Award	Park Ha-na	Won	
KBS Drama Awards	2016	Excellence Award, Actress in a Daily Drama	The Promise	Nominated	
KBS Drama Awards	2018	Excellence Award, Actress in a Daily Drama	Mysterious Personal Shopper	Won	
KBS Drama Awards	2020	Excellence Award, Actress in a Daily Drama	Fatal Promise	Won	
KBS Drama Awards	2021	Excellence Award, Actress in a Serial Drama	Young Lady and Gentleman	Won	
KBS Drama Awards	2022	Excellence Award, Actress in a Daily Drama	Vengeance of the Bride	Won	
KBS Drama Awards	2022	Best Actress in Drama Special/TV Cinema	Devil in the Lake	Nominated	
KBS Drama Awards	2022	Top Excellence Award, Actress	Vengeance of the Bride	Nominated	
MBC Drama Awards	2015	Best New Actress in a Serial Drama	Apgujeong Midnight Sun	Won	
