= Choi Sung-jae =

South Korean actor

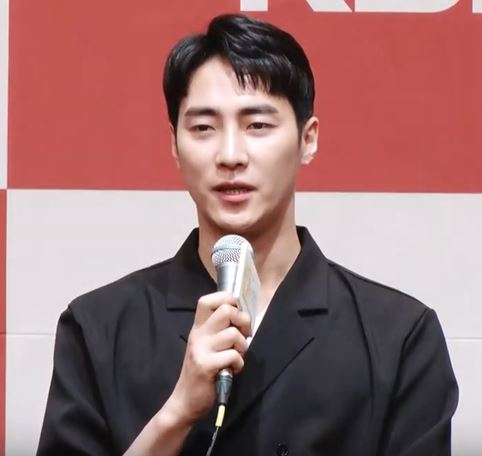
- Choi in May 2019
- Born: 18 July 1984 (age 40); South Korea
- Occupation: Actor

Korean name
- Hangul: 최성재
- RR: Choe Seongjae
- MR: Ch'oe Sŏngjae

Choi Sung-jae (born 18 July 1984) is a South Korean actor.

== Filmography ==
=== Television series ===
Year	Title	Role	Network
2012	Feast of the Gods		MBC
2013	Blue Tower		tvN
2014	Gap-dong	Detective	tvN
2015	The Man in the Mask	Ki-tae	KBS2
2016	The Doctors	Hwangbo Tae-yang	SBS
2016	Something About 1%	Jung Sun-woo	Dramax
2017	A Sea of Her Own	Kim Sun-woo	KBS2
2017	Circle	Humans B Central Control Room Agent (Ep. 2, special appearance)	tvN
2017	Temperature of Love	Lee Sung-jae	SBS
2018	My Contracted Husband, Mr. Oh	Oh Byung-chul	MBC
2018	Grand Prince	Kim Kwan	TV Chosun
2019	Liver or Die	Kang Yeol-han	KBS2
2019	A Place in the Sun	Choi Gwang-il	KBS2
2020-2021	My Wonderful Life	Jang Si-Kyung	MBC
2021	Nevertheless	Yoo Hyeon-woo (Ep. 1, cameo)	JTBC

=== Film ===
Year	Title	Role
2017	The Outlaws	Detective

== Awards and nominations ==
Year	Award	Category	Nominated work	Result
2019	12th Korea Drama Awards	Best New Actor	Liver or Die	Nominated
