= Miss Lee =

2019 South Korean television series

- Promotional poster
- Hangul: 청일전자 미쓰리
- Lit.: Chungil Electronics Miss Lee
- RR: Cheongil jeonja Misseu Ri
- MR: Ch'ŏngil chŏnja Missŭ Ri
- Genre: Workplace; Drama
- Created by: Studio Dragon
- Written by: Park Jeong-hwa
- Directed by: Han Dong-hwa
- Starring: Lee Hye-ri; Kim Sang-kyung; Uhm Hyun-kyung; Cha Seo-won
- Country of origin: South Korea
- Original language: Korean
- No. of episodes: 16

Production
- Producer: Lee Sang Soo
- Production company: Logos Film

Original release
- Network: tvN
- Release: September 25 – November 14, 2019

Miss Lee (Korean: 청일전자 미쓰리) is a 2019 South Korean television series starring Lee Hye-ri, Kim Sang-kyung, Uhm Hyun-kyung and Cha Seo-won. Created by Studio Dragon and produced by Logos Film, it aired on tvN from September 25 to November 14, 2019.

== Synopsis ==
The story of an ordinary employee named Lee Seon-sim who suddenly becomes the CEO of the company she works at.

== Cast ==
=== Main ===
- Lee Hye-ri as Lee Seon-sim
- Kim Sang-kyung as Yoo Jin-wook
- Uhm Hyun-kyung as Koo Ji-na
- Cha Seo-won as Park Do-joon

=== Supporting ===
- Baek Ji-won as Choi Yeong-ja
- Jung Hee-tae as Hwang Ji-sang
- Jung Soo-young as Lee Sun-shin
- Kim Eung-soo as Oh Man-bok
- Kim Hyung-mook as Moon Hyeong-seok
- Kwon Han-sol as Seo-eun
- Lee Hwa-ryong as Song Young-hoon
- Kim Jae-hyun as Idol star
- Christian Lagahit as Kisan

== Viewership ==
Miss Lee : South Korea viewers per episode (thousands)

Season	Episode number																Average
Season	1	2	3	4	5	6	7	8	9	10	11	12	13	14	15	16	Average
1	628	759	744	902	618	625	542	548	499	494	563	595	598	643	547	842	634

Source: Audience measurement performed nationwide by Nielsen Media Research.

Average TV viewership ratings
Ep.	Original broadcast date	Average audience share (AGB Nielsen)	
Ep.	Original broadcast date	Nationwide	Seoul
1	September 25, 2019	2.628%	3.118%
2	September 26, 2019	3.188%	3.833%
3	October 2, 2019	3.040%	3.134%
4	October 3, 2019	3.867%	4.407%
5	October 9, 2019	2.741%	3.236%
6	October 10, 2019	2.986%	3.545%
7	October 16, 2019	2.495%	2.883%
8	October 17, 2019	2.495%	2.911%
9	October 23, 2019	2.448%	2.796%
10	October 24, 2019	2.333%	2.757%
11	October 30, 2019	2.611%	2.502%
12	October 31, 2019	2.913%	3.258%
13	November 6, 2019	2.779%	3.215%
14	November 7, 2019	2.827%	2.878%
15	November 13, 2019	2.493%	2.726%
16	November 14, 2019	3.902%	4.140%
Average		2.859%	3.209%
In the table above, the blue numbers represent the lowest ratings and the red numbers represent the highest ratings.; This drama aired on a cable channel/pay TV which normally has a relatively smaller audience compared to free-to-air TV/public broadcasters (KBS, SBS, MBC and EBS).
