= Secrets and Lies (South Korean TV series) =

2018–2019 South Korean television series

- Promotional poster
- Hangul: 비밀과 거짓말
- RR: Bimilgwa geojinmal
- MR: Pimilgwa kŏjinmal
- Genre: Family; Melodrama
- Created by: Jang Jae-hoon
- Written by: Lee Do-hyun
- Directed by: Kim Jung-Ho; Kim Yong-min
- Starring: Oh Seung-ah; Seo Hae-won; Kim Kyung-nam; Lee Joong-moon
- Composer: Jang Eun-jin
- Country of origin: South Korea
- Original language: Korean
- No. of episodes: 122 (Note: Originally scheduled to air for 120 episodes, the series was extended by two episodes in lieu of 23 pre-empts.)

Production
- Executive producer: Lee Min-soo
- Producer: Kim Seo-gon
- Cinematography: Gong Hyung-seok; Kim Yeon-joong
- Editor: Jo Tae-hyun
- Camera setup: Single-camera
- Running time: 35 minutes
- Production company: MBC C&I

Original release
- Network: MBC TV
- Release: June 25, 2018 – January 11, 2019

Secrets and Lies (Korean: 비밀과 거짓말; RR: Bimilgwa geojinmal) is a 2018 South Korean television series starring Oh Seung-ah, Seo Hae-won, Kim Kyung-nam, and Lee Joong-moon. The series aired daily on MBC TV from 7:15 p.m. to 7:55 p.m. (KST) from June 25, 2018 to January 11, 2019.

== Cast ==
=== Main ===
- Oh Seung-ah as Shin Hwa-kyung (Park Seon-joo) - The lead character of the series. Hwa-kyung is evil and her ambition will cause her own downfall. In the end, she was imprisoned for attempted murder.
- Seo Hae-won as Han Woo-jung, an aspiring announcer
- Kim Kyung-nam as Yoon Do-bin, MBS PD
- Lee Joong-moon as Yoon Jae-bin, Do-bin's younger brother

=== Supporting cast ===
==== People around Hwa Kyung ====
- Jeon No-min as Shin Myung-joon
- Lee Il-hwa as Oh Yun-hee
- Suh In-suk as Oh Sang-pil
- ??? as Oh Yun-suk

==== People around Woo Jung ====
- Kim Hye-sun as Han Joo-won
- Lee Joon-young as Han Woo-chul

==== People around Do Bin ====
- Park Chul-min as Yoon Chang-soo
- Kim Hee-jung as Heo Yong-shim
- Kim Ye-rin as Yoon Sae-hee

=== Extended Cast ===
- Jun Jung-ro as Secretary Min

== Ratings ==
- In this table, the blue numbers represent the lowest ratings and the red numbers represent the highest ratings.
- NR denotes that the drama did not rank in the top 20 daily programs on that date.
- N/A denotes that the rating is not known.

| Ep. | Original broadcast date | Average audience share | | |
| Ep. | Original broadcast date | TNmS | AGB Nielsen | |
| Ep. | Original broadcast date | Nationwide | Nationwide | Seoul |
|---|---|---|---|---|
| 1 | June 25, 2018 | 5.3% | 4.9% (NR) | 2.7% (NR) |
| 2 | June 26, 2018 | 5.6% | 5.2% (NR) | 3.0% (NR) |
| 3 | June 27, 2018 | 4.9% | 4.5% (NR) | 2.3% (NR) |
| 4 | June 28, 2018 | 5.2% | 4.8% (NR) | 2.5% (NR) |
| 5 | June 29, 2018 | 4.7% | 4.3% (NR) | 2.1% (NR) |
| 6 | July 2, 2018 | 5.8% | 5.4% (NR) | 3.2% (NR) |
| 7 | July 3, 2018 | 6.2% | 5.8% (NR) | 3.6% (NR) |
| 8 | July 4, 2018 | 6.5% | 5.7% (18th) | 5.8% (16th) |
| 9 | July 5, 2018 | 6.3% | 5.9% (15th) | 5.2% (14th) |
| 10 | July 6, 2018 | 6.4% | 5.4% (15th) | 4.7% (19th) |
| 11 | July 9, 2018 | 7.9% | 5.9% (NR) | 3.7% (NR) |
| 12 | July 10, 2018 | 6.0% | 5.6% (NR) | 3.4% (NR) |
| 13 | July 11, 2018 | 6.9% | 5.8% (17th) | 5.6% (18th) |
| 14 | July 12, 2018 | 6.5% | 4.8% (19th) | 2.5% (NR) |
| 15 | July 13, 2018 | 5.6% | 5.3% (17th) | 3.1% (NR) |
| 16 | July 16, 2018 | 6.7% | 5.0% (NR) | 2.9% (NR) |
| 17 | July 17, 2018 | 6.3% | 4.8% (NR) | 2.4% (NR) |
| 18 | July 18, 2018 | 6.4% | 5.0% (18th) | 4.9% (19th) |
| 19 | July 19, 2018 | 6.0% | 5.2% (15th) | 4.8% (18th) |
| 20 | July 20, 2018 | 6.5% | 4.7% (20th) | 4.5% (NR) |
| 21 | July 23, 2018 | 4.7% | 4.3% (NR) | 3.9% (NR) |
| 22 | July 24, 2018 | 6.3% | 5.0% (NR) | 4.7% (NR) |
| 23 | July 25, 2018 | 7.2% | 5.9% (17th) | 5.3% (NR) |
| 24 | July 26, 2018 | 6.1% | 5.7% (14th) | 5.8% (13th) |
| 25 | July 27, 2018 | 6.6% | 5.1% (19th) | 5.3% (20th) |
| 26 | July 30, 2018 | 6.6% | 5.6% (19th) | 5.2% (20th) |
| 27 | July 31, 2018 | 6.9% | 5.6% (18th) | —N/a |
| 28 | August 1, 2018 | 5.9% | 5.1% (20th) | —N/a |
| 29 | August 2, 2018 | 5.7% | 5.4% (16th) | 4.9% (18th) |
| 30 | August 3, 2018 | 5.7% | 5.8% (17th) | 5.7% (19th) |
| 31 | August 6, 2018 | 8.2% | 6.4% (18th) | 6.2% (16th) |
| 32 | August 7, 2018 | 7.1% | 5.5% (20th) | —N/a |
| 33 | August 8, 2018 | 6.8% | 6.1% (16th) | 5.8% (18th) |
| 34 | August 9, 2018 | 7.8% | 6.2% (15th) | 6.0% (15th) |
| 35 | August 10, 2018 | 7.1% | 6.2% (15th) | 5.7% (19th) |
| 36 | August 13, 2018 | 6.9% | 6.1% (17th) | 6.0% (18th) |
| 37 | August 14, 2018 | 7.2% | 6.4% (12th) | 6.2% (12th) |
| 38 | August 15, 2018 | 7.5% | 6.8% (14th) | 7.3% (12th) |
| 39 | August 16, 2018 | 7.5% | 5.9% (13th) | 5.0% (16th) |
| 40 | August 17, 2018 | 8.0% | 6.7% (15th) | 6.1% (17th) |
| 41 | August 21, 2018 (Note: No episodes were aired on August 20, 22, 23 and 27 to 31 due to coverage of the 2018 Asian Games.) | 7.1% | 5.4% (NR) | 5.3% (NR) |
| 42 | August 24, 2018 | 6.8% | 5.1% (NR) | 4.9% (NR) |
| 43 | September 3, 2018 | 8.5% | 6.5% (18th) | —N/a |
| 44 | September 4, 2018 | 8.8% | 6.9% (13th) | 6.4% (12th) |
| 45 | September 5, 2018 | 8.3% | 7.7% (8th) | 6.8% (11th) |
| 46 | September 6, 2018 | 9.0% | 6.7% (13th) | 5.5% (16th) |
| 47 | September 7, 2018 | 8.4% | 6.7% (17th) | 5.8% (17th) |
| 48 | September 10, 2018 | 8.3% | 7.4% (14th) | 6.9% (16th) |
| 49 | September 11, 2018 | 8.7% | 6.6% (12th) | 6.2% (10th) |
| 50 | September 12, 2018 | —N/a | 7.2% (10th) | 6.4% (15th) |
| 51 | September 13, 2018 | 8.3% | 7.0% (11th) | 5.9% (14th) |
| 52 | September 14, 2018 | —N/a | 6.8% (16th) | 6.0% (16th) |
| 53 | September 17, 2018 | 6.2% | 5.5% (19th) | 5.7% (18th) |
| 54 | September 21, 2018 (Note: No episodes were aired from September 18 to 20 due to coverage of the September 2018 inter-Korean summit.) | 9.5% | 7.0% (11th) | 6.4% (16th) |
| 55 | September 27, 2018 (Note: No episodes were aired from September 24 to 26 due to the Chuseok 2018 Idol Star Athletics Championships.) | 9.1% | 8.0% (12th) | 7.6% (13th) |
| 56 | September 28, 2018 | 9.6% | 8.0% (7th) | 7.1% (10th) |
| 57 | October 2, 2018 (Note: No episode was aired on October 1 due to the Armed Forces Day holiday.) | —N/a | 8.2% (10th) | 6.8% (14th) |
| 58 | October 3, 2018 | —N/a | 8.3% (10th) | 7.7% (11th) |
| 59 | October 4, 2018 | —N/a | 9.0% (12th) | 8.0% (11th) |
| 60 | October 5, 2018 | 9.8% | 8.6% (9th) | 8.1% (9th) |
| 61 | October 6, 2018 | 11.3% | 9.1% (4th) | 8.1% (7th) |
| 62 | October 9, 2018 | 10.3% | 8.8% (7th) | 8.0% (7th) |
| 63 | October 10, 2018 | 10.8% | 9.2% (6th) | 8.2% (9th) |
| 64 | October 11, 2018 | 10.7% | 9.2% (6th) | 8.4% (7th) |
| 65 | October 15, 2018 (Note: No episode was aired on October 12 due to the broadcast of a soccer friendly match between South Korea and Uruguay.) | 11.4% | 9.5% (5th) | 8.8% (5th) |
| 66 | October 17, 2018 (Note: No episodes were aired on October 16, 19, 23, 30 and November 5 due to the broadcast of KBO playoff baseball games.) | 11.3% | 9.7% (5th) | 9.1% (7th) |
| 67 | October 18, 2018 | 11.3% | 9.5% (6th) | 8.2% (6th) |
| 68 | October 22, 2018 | 12.0% | 9.4% (7th) | 8.6% (7th) |
| 69 | October 24, 2018 | 12.4% | 10.2% (5th) | 9.6% (7th) |
| 70 | October 25, 2018 | 12.7% | 10.2% (9th) | 9.5% (10th) |
| 71 | October 26, 2018 | 11.7% | 9.9% (6th) | 9.0% (6th) |
| 72 | October 29, 2018 | 12.8% | 10.1% (4th) | 8.9% (6th) |
| 73 | October 31, 2018 | —N/a | 10.3% (6th) | 10.0% (5th) |
| 74 | November 1, 2018 | —N/a | 9.7% (7th) | 8.9% (8th) |
| 75 | November 2, 2018 | | | |
| 76 | November 6, 2018 | | | |
| 77 | November 7, 2018 | | | |
| 78 | November 8, 2018 | | | |
| 79 | November 9, 2018 | | | |
| 80 | November 12, 2018 | | | |
| 81 | November 13, 2018 | | | |
| 82 | November 14, 2018 | | | |
| 83 | November 15, 2018 | | | |
| 84 | November 16, 2018 | | | |
| 85 | November 19, 2018 | | | |
| 86 | November 20, 2018 | | | |
| 87 | November 21, 2018 | | | |
| 88 | November 22, 2018 | | | |
| 89 | November 23, 2018 | | | |
| 90 | November 26, 2018 | | | |
| 91 | November 27, 2018 | | | |
| 92 | November 28, 2018 | | | |
| 93 | November 29, 2018 | | | |
| 94 | November 30, 2018 | | | |
| 95 | December 3, 2018 | | | |
| 96 | December 4, 2018 | | | |
| 97 | December 5, 2018 | | | |
| 98 | December 6, 2018 | | | |
| 99 | December 7, 2018 | | | |
| 100 | December 10, 2018 | | | |
| 101 | December 11, 2018 | | | |
| 102 | December 12, 2018 | | | |
| 103 | December 13, 2018 | | | |
| 104 | December 14, 2018 | | | |
| 105 | December 17, 2018 | | | |
| 106 | December 18, 2018 | | | |
| 107 | December 19, 2018 | | | |
| 108 | December 20, 2018 | | | |
| 109 | December 21, 2018 | | | |
| 110 | December 24, 2018 | | | |
| 111 | December 25, 2018 | | | |
| 112 | December 26, 2018 | | | |
| 113 | December 27, 2018 | | | |
| 114 | December 28, 2018 | | | |
| 115 | January 2, 2019 (Note: No episodes were shown on December 31, 2018 and January 1, 2019 due to New Year specials.) | | | |
| 116 | January 3, 2019 | | | |
| 117 | January 4, 2019 | | | |
| 118 | January 7, 2019 | | | |
| 119 | January 8, 2019 | | | |
| 120 | January 9, 2019 | | | |
| 121 | January 10, 2019 | | | |
| 122 | January 11, 2019 | | | |
| Average | | — (Note: Due to some ratings not recorded, the exact average rating is unknown.) | — | — |

== Awards and nominations ==
| Year | Award | Category | Nominated work | Result | Ref. |
|---|---|---|---|---|---|
| 2018 | 2018 MBC Drama Awards | Top Excellence Award, Actress in a Soap Opera | Lee Il-hwa | Nominated | |
| 2018 | 2018 MBC Drama Awards | Excellence Award, Actress in a Soap Opera | Kim Hye-sun | Nominated | |
| 2018 | 2018 MBC Drama Awards | Best Supporting Actor/Actress in a Serial Drama | Jeon No-min | Won | |
| 2018 | 2018 MBC Drama Awards | Best Supporting Actor/Actress in a Serial Drama | Kim Hee-jung | Nominated | |
| 2018 | 2018 MBC Drama Awards | Best New Actress | Oh Seung-ah | Won | |

== Original soundtrack ==
Doctors OST

Soundtrack album
- Genre: Soundtrack
- Language: Korean

=== Track listings ===
| No. | Title | Artist | Length |
|---|---|---|---|
| 1. | "Hanging Around" | Byun Jin-sub | 4:18 |
