= Champ (2011 film) =

- Theatrical poster
- Hangul: 챔프
- RR: Chaempeu
- MR: Ch'aemp'ŭ
- Directed by: Lee Hwan-kyung
- Written by: Lee Hwan-kyung; Kim Young-seok; Kim Hwang-sung
- Produced by: Kim Min-ki; Lee Myung-sook; Lee Sang-hoon; Kim Min-guk; Lim Hee-chul; Chung Jae-seung; Heo Chang; Kim Sang-eun
- Starring: Cha Tae-hyun; Kim Su-jung; Yu Oh-seong; Park Ha-sun
- Cinematography: Lee Sang-gak
- Edited by: Kim So-yeon; Choi Jae-geun
- Music by: Lee Dong-jun
- Production companies: FineWorks; Daemyung Culture Factory; Vantage Holdings; Jidam Inc. (formerly Yein Culture); CL Entertainment
- Distributed by: Showbox/Mediaplex
- Release date: September 7, 2011
- Running time: 133 minutes
- Country: South Korea
- Language: Korean
- Box office: US$3,232,193

Champ (Korean: 챔프) is 2011 South Korean sport comedy-drama film is about a former horse jockey who became blind after losing his wife in an accident, but now gets a second chance with the help of his daughter and an injured horse.

== Plot ==
Two damaged souls race together for the race of their lifetime. Horse jockey Seung-ho loses his wife in a fatal car accident. The accident also leaves him practically blind. No longer able to work, he leads an aimless life with his little daughter. Things take turn for the worse when he loses all his savings after trying to cheat at the horse track and flees to a remote ranch in Jeju Island. There he meets a violent and limping horse named Woo-bak and he trains the horse for racing. Against all odds, Seung-ho and Woo-bak finish first in the preliminaries but when Seung-ho's blindness is discovered by the officials, they're disqualified from the finals. Woo-bak rejects all other jockeys and waits for Seung-ho to come back. The limping horse and his blind jockey bet everything to race one last time.

== Cast ==
- Cha Tae-hyun as Seung-ho
- Kim Su-jung as Ye-seung
- Yu Oh-seong as Trainer Yoon
- Park Ha-sun as Yoon-hee
- Park Won-sang as Trainer Kim
- Baek Do-bin as Sung-hyun
- Kim Kwang-kyu as Kwang-kyu
- Yoon Hee-seok as In-kwon
- Kim Ki-cheon as Director Park
- Kim Sang-ho as Sheriff
- Son Byeong-Ok as Gganjookyi
- Lee Yun-hee as Seung-ho's wife
- Baek Yoon-sik as President of horse riding association

== Box office ==
The film was released in South Korea on September 7, 2011. The film grossed US$765,803 on its opening weekend, ranking at number 6 with 112,513 admissions. In total the film grossed US$3,232,193 and had 535,766 admissions nationwide.
