= The Love Is Coming =

- Promotional poster
- Genre: Family; Romance; Melodrama
- Written by: Kim In-Kang
- Starring: Kim Ji-young; Lee Min-young; Go Se-won; Lee Hoon
- Country of origin: South Korea
- Original language: Korean
- No. of seasons: 1
- No. of episodes: 122

Production
- Production company: Hunus Entertainment

Original release
- Network: SBS
- Release: June 20 – December 16, 2016

The Love Is Coming (Korean: 사랑이 오네요; RR: Sarangi oneyo; lit. Here Comes Love) is a 2016 South Korean television series starring Kim Ji-young, Lee Min-young, Go Se-won and Lee Hoon. It aired on SBS on Mondays to Fridays at 8:30 AM KST starting June 20, 2016 and ending on 16 December, 2016.

== Summary ==
A single mother who was struggling with life finally realizes the true meaning of happiness as she discovers that it is the little things that make her happy.

== Cast ==
=== Main cast ===
- Kim Ji-young as Lee Eun-hee
- Lee Min-young as Na Sun-young
- Go Se-won as Na Min-soo
- Lee Hoon as Kim sang-ho / Geum Bang-seok
- Gong Da-Im as Lee Hae-in
- Shim Eun-jin as Shin Da-hee / Lee Chil-Chil
- Jang Dong-Jik as Oh Woo-joo

=== Supporting cast ===
- Park Geun-hyung as Na Dae-gi
- Kim Young-ran as Yang Bok-soon
- Min Chan-gi as Kim Jung-hoon
- Lee Young-yoo as Kim Ah-young
- Maeng Se-chang as Jang Han-sol
- Jeok Woo as Park Ri-na
- Choi Sung-min as Kim Ho-young
