= Go Se-won =

South Korean actor

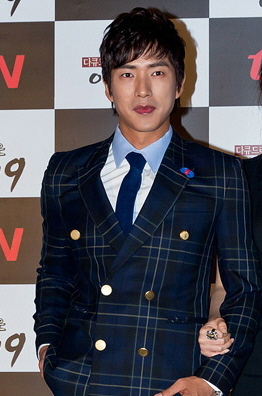
- Ko in September 2011
- Born: December 13, 1977 (age 48); Seoul, South Korea
- Other name: Ko Se-won
- Education: Dankook University – Theater and Film
- Occupation: Actor
- Years active: 1997–present
- Agent: Hunus Entertainment
- Spouse: Shin Rara (m. 2011; div. 2017)

Korean name
- Hangul: 고세원
- RR: Go Sewon
- MR: Ko Sewŏn

Go Se-won (born December 13, 1977) is a South Korean actor. Go began his acting career in musical theatre, then made the leap to television in 2007. He has played supporting roles in several Korean dramas such as Three Brothers, Cinderella's Stepsister, Three Sisters, You Don't Know Women, and The Moon and Stars for You. Go has also appeared in 13 seasons of cable sitcom Rude Miss Young-ae. In 2013, he was cast in his first onscreen leading role in the daily melodrama Crazy Love.

== Filmography ==
=== Television series ===
- Fatal Promise (KBS2, 2020)
- The Last Empress (SBS, 2018)
- What's Wrong with Secretary Kim (tvN, 2018)
- The Love Is Coming (SBS, 2016)
- Dodohara (SBS Plus, 2014)
- A Better Tomorrow (YouTube/Naver TV Cast, 2014)
- Mother's Garden (MBC, 2014)
- Crazy Love (tvN, 2013)
- The Moon and Stars for You (KBS1, 2012)
- Living in Style (SBS, 2011–2012)
- The Woman from the Olle Road (KBS2, 2011)
- You Don't Know Women (SBS, 2010)
- Three Sisters (SBS, 2010)
- Cinderella's Stepsister (KBS2, 2010)
- Three Brothers (KBS2, 2009–2010)
- Life Special Investigation Team (MBC, 2008)
- Five Men and a Baby Angel (Mnet, 2008)
- Ugly Miss Young-ae (tvN, 2007–14)

=== Variety shows ===
- King of Mask Singer (2015)

=== Film ===
- Red Family (2013)
- Mai Ratima (2013)
- Perfect Game (2011)
- Boy (2011)
- A Friend in Need aka Yeouido (2010)

== Musical theatre ==
- Finding Kim Jong-wook (2012)
- Sherlock Holmes: The Musical (2012)
- Oh! While You Were Sleeping (2010)
- I Love You (2009)
- Finding Kim Jong-wook (2009)
- The Rocky Horror Show (2008)
- Love in Cappuccino (2007)
- Le Passe-Muraille (2006)

== Awards ==
- 2012 1st K-Drama Star Awards: Fashionista Award
