= Three Sisters (South Korean TV series) =

2010 South Korean TV series

- Genre: Drama, Family
- Written by: Choi Yoon-jung
- Directed by: Yoon Ryu-hae; Sohn Jae-sung
- Starring: Myung Se-bin; Yang Mi-ra; Jo An
- Country of origin: South Korea
- Original language: Korean
- No. of episodes: 123

Production
- Executive producers: Kim Jung-min (SBS); Lee Ju-hyun; Hong Hyun-suk
- Producer: Kim Yong-jin
- Running time: Mondays to Fridays at 19:15 (KST)
- Production companies: EVERYSHOW; Saram&Saram

Original release
- Network: Seoul Broadcasting System
- Release: 19 April – 27 October 2010

Three Sisters (Korean: 세자매; RR: Sejamae) is a 2010 South Korean television series starring Myung Se-bin, Yang Mi-ra, Jo An, Song Jong-ho, Shim Hyung-tak, and Kim Young-jae. The daily drama is about the lives of two generations of three sisters, portraying their relationships and the difficulties they face. It aired on SBS on Mondays to Fridays at 19:15 from April 19 to October 27, 2010, for 123 episodes.

== Plot ==
39-year-old Kim Eun-young (Myung Se-bin) is the eldest among the younger generation of sisters. She has a thoughtful personality and was good in school, but to help her family she didn't attend college. Eun-young gets hurt when her husband Choi Young-ho (Kim Young-jae) has an affair, and contemplates divorce.

33-year-old Kim Eun-shil (Yang Mi-ra) is the middle sister of the younger generation of sisters. She is a divorcee and her daughter Yoon Goo-seul (Ahn Seo-hyun) lives with her ex-husband. Her character is somewhat vain, enjoying expensive items like designer clothes and bags.

29-year-old Kim Eun-joo (Jo An) is the youngest sister of the younger generation of sisters. Although she is a widow, she lives a bright life.

65-year-old Jang Jang-ae (Jung Jae-soon) is the eldest among the older generation of sisters. After her parents died, Jang-ae quit school to raise her two younger sisters. She never married and has no children.

61-year-old Jang Soon-ae (Park Won-sook) has a very considerate personality. She is the middle sister of the older generation of sisters, and the mother of the three sisters of the younger generation. She is married to Kim Won-tae (Jang Yong), and her husband runs a restaurant with her older sister Jang-ae. Soon-ae also has a son, Kim Eun-gook (Lee Je-hoon), who is adopted.

49-year-old Jang Ji-ae (Kyeon Mi-ri) is the youngest of the older generation of sisters. After the death of her parents soon after her birth, Ji-ae was raised by her oldest sister Jang-ae. With Jang-ae's support, Ji-ae was able to attend college. But she fell in love, dropped out, married her college sweetheart, then got divorced. She later lost her fortune to a younger man. Ji-ae has a romantic personality and now lives with Jang-ae.

== Cast ==
Kim family

- Myung Se-bin as Kim Eun-young (eldest sister)
- Yang Mi-ra as Kim Eun-shil (middle sister)
- Jo An as Kim Eun-joo (youngest sister)
- Jang Yong as Kim Won-tae (father)
- Park Won-sook as Jang Soon-ae (mother)
- Lee Je-hoon as Kim Eun-gook (brother)

Jang family

- Jung Jae-soon as Jang Jang-ae (Soon-ae's older sister)
- Kyeon Mi-ri as Jang Ji-ae (Soon-ae's younger sister)

Lee family

- Song Jong-ho as Lee Min-woo
- Hyun Woo-sung as Lee Min-chul (brother)
- Park Jung-soo as Park Young-ok (mother)

Go family

- Shin Soo-jung as Go Ji-young
- Ahn Gil-ho as Go Tae-young (brother)
- Park Joon-geum as Shin Sook-ja (mother)
- Kim Jin-woo as Go Se-jong (Eun-joo's son)

Choi family

- Kim Young-jae as Choi Young-ho
- Seo Ji-hee as Choi Bo-ram (Eun-young and Young-ho's daughter)
- Choi Eun-sook as Young-ho's mother
- Nam Hyun-joo as Young-ho's sister-in-law
- Lee Dae-ro as Young-ho's father (cameo)

Extended cast

- Shim Hyung-tak as Park Woo-chan
- Ahn Seo-hyun as Yoon Goo-seul (Eun-shil's daughter)
- Im Ji-eun as Kang Mi-ran
- Shin Ji-soo as Park Jin-sook
- Kim Hae-in as Kyung-ah (intern doctor)
- Go Se-won as Park Sang-tae
- Kim Byung-se as Jae-suk
- Jung Dong-hwan as Kim Won-bin
- Seo Kwon-soon as Jae-suk's mother
- Kang Sung-jin as Gun-dal (cameo)
- Kim Young-ran as matchmaker Madam Tu (cameo)
- Han Da-min as Song Tae-hee (cameo)

== Awards ==
- 2010 SBS Drama Awards: Best Supporting Actress in a Weekend/Daily Drama - Im Ji-eun
