= Won Ki-joon =

South Korean actor (born 1974)

- Born: February 12, 1974 (age 52); South Korea
- Education: Hanyang University - Theater and Film
- Occupation: Actor
- Years active: 1994–present

Korean name
- Hangul: 원기준
- Hanja: 元基俊
- RR: Won Gijun
- MR: Wŏn Kijun

Won Ki-joon (Korean: 원기준; born February 12, 1974) is a South Korean actor. He starred in television dramas such as Jumong (2006), Gourmet (2008), and Everybody Say Kimchi (2014).

== Filmography ==
=== Television drama ===
Year	Title	Role
1995	Inside the Mysterious Mirror	Won-rae
1998	Seven Brides	Jang-sik
1999	You Don't Know My Mind	
2000	Fireworks	Park Han-soo
2000	I Want To Keep Seeing You	Choi Young-min
2001	I Like Dong-seo	
2005	Pearl Earring	Kang Hyun-joong
2006	Jumong	Prince Youngpo
2008	Gourmet	Gong Min-woo
2008	Choe Yang-eop	Choe Yang-eop
2009	Can't Stop Now	Lee Byung-joo
2009	Dream	Jang Dae-sik
2010	Jejungwon	Evangelist Jung
2010	Golden House	Lee Jeong-heon
2010	Coffee House	Hyun-seok
2011	Twinkle Twinkle	Jegal Joon-soo
2011	Pit-a-pat, My Love	Gu Chang-ho
2011	Oh My God	Won Ki-joon
2012	Happy and	Kyung-chul (episode 7)
2012	KBS Drama Special – "Return Home"	Jin-mook
2013	Hur Jun, The Original Story	Heo Seok
2014	Everybody Say Kimchi	Im Dong-joon
2016	A Beautiful Mind	Yum Gyeon-ho
2017	Always Spring	Han Min-soo
2018	Evergreen	Oh-soo's father
2018	Gangnam Scandal	Bang Yoon-tae
2019	Everybody Say Kungdari	Lim Dong-Jun
2020–21	My Wonderful Life	

=== Film ===
Year	Title	Role
1997	PpilKu	Ki-chul
1999	Until We Meet	Mr. Park
2010	Finding Mr. Destiny	Kim Jong-wook the doctor (cameo)
2013	The Puppet	Joon-ki
2015	The Lingerie Murders	

=== Variety show ===
Year	Title	Notes
2015	King of Mask Singer	Contestant, pilot episode

== Theater ==
Year	Title	Role
2004	Grease	Doody
2006–2007	Finding Kim Jong-wook	Kim Jong-wook
2007	The Great Janggeum	Min Jeong-ho
2008	Really Really Like You	Kang Jin-young
2008	Return of High School Joker	19-year-old Na Doo-soo
2009	Our Sweet Days of Youth	Young-min
2010	Rain Man	Charlie Babbitt
2010	Princess Pyeonggang and the Fool Ondal	Ondal

== Awards and nominations ==
Year	Award	Category	Nominated work	Result
2006	MBC Drama Awards	Best New Actor	Jumong	Won
2008	16th Korean Culture and Entertainment Awards	Excellence Award in Drama and Broadcasting	Gourmet	Won
2008	SBS Drama Awards	Best Supporting Actor in a Special Planning Drama	Gourmet	Nominated
