= Wedding (TV series) =

- Promotional poster for Wedding
- Genre: Romance, Drama
- Written by: Oh Soo-yeon
- Directed by: Jung Hae-ryong
- Starring: Jang Na-ra; Ryu Si-won; Myung Se-bin; Lee Hyun-woo
- Theme music composer: Oh Seok-joon
- Country of origin: South Korea
- Original language: Korean
- No. of episodes: 18

Production
- Executive producer: Kim Won-yong
- Producer: Shin Hyun-taek
- Running time: 70 minutes on Mondays and Tuesdays at 21:55 (KST)
- Production companies: Samhwa Networks (formerly Samhwa Production)

Original release
- Network: Korean Broadcasting System
- Release: August 23 – October 25, 2005

Wedding (Korean: 웨딩) is an 18-episode South Korean television drama that aired on KBS2 in 2005. The series explores the relationship of a newly wed couple, showing how two people, who met and married through an arranged matchmaking, slowly develop a relationship and learn what it means to be married. Some of the issues explored include what is the most important thing in a marriage, trust and honesty between a couple, how past relationships affect present, and the role of family in a relationship. Unlike other dramas written by Oh Soo-yeon, which focused on people falling in love by fate or destiny, this one is about two people with very different personalities, values, and backgrounds, and seeing how they learn to love one another despite all of their differences.

== Plot ==
Lee Se-na (Jang Na-ra) is a single child raised in a wealthy family and pampered by her protective parents. She has never been hurt and naively believes that love can overcome all obstacles. Although she has a big heart, she is selfish, not trusting, and cares mostly only about her own feelings. One day, she meets Han Seung-woo (Ryu Si-won) through an arranged date and instantly falls in love with him. Seung-woo is from a poor family and likes a simple and frugal life. Although he is very honest and righteous, he has difficulty sensing other people's feelings and expressing his own. After a short period of time, Se-na and Seung-woo decide to get married, before they have truly gotten to know one another. We also meet Shin Yoon-soo (Myung Se-bin) and Seo Jin-hee (Lee Hyun-woo), both childhood friends of Seung-woo and each with their strengths, shortcomings, and past relationships with the main duo. As they learn more about one another and what it means to be married, Se-na and Seung-woo soon begin to argue and fight due to their differences, past relationships, mistrust, and their insecurities about the relationship. Their relationship deteriorates to the brink of divorce, not knowing whether they can overcome the obstacles that face them.

== Cast ==
- Jang Na-ra as Lee Se-na
  - Kim Bo-ra as young Lee Se-na
- Ryu Si-won as Han Seung-woo
- Myung Se-bin as Shin Yoon-soo
- Lee Hyun-woo as Seo Jin-hee
- Choi Woo-je as Jung-min
- Tomoaki Okabe as Louie
- Gong Hyun-joo as Oh Soo-ji
- Kim Min-joo as Cha Eun-hee
- Kang Seok-woo as Lee Jung-il
- Na Young-hee as Sung Hae-rim
- Jung Young-sook as Jung Sook-hee
- Lee Sae-min as Se-na's brother who's studying abroad
- Han Seung-joo as Seung-woo's brother
- Song Chang-eui as Yoon Hyung-chul
- Lee Young-ah
- Lee Hye-sook
- Min Ji-ah
