= Birthcare Center =

2020 South Korean TV series on birthcare

- Promotional poster
- Hangul: 산후조리원
- Hanja: 産後調理院
- Lit.: Postnatal Care Center
- RR: Sanhujoriwon
- MR: Sanhujoriwŏn
- Genre: Melodrama; Medical drama; Comedy
- Created by: Jinnie Choi for CJ ENM
- Written by: Kim Ji-soo; Choi Yoon-hee; Yoon Su-min
- Directed by: Park Su-won
- Starring: Uhm Ji-won; Park Ha-sun; Jang Hye-jin; Yoon Park; Choi Ri
- Country of origin: South Korea
- Original language: Korean
- No. of episodes: 8

Production
- Producer: Kim Dong-rae
- Camera setup: Single-camera
- Running time: 70 minutes
- Production companies: tvN; RaemongRaein Co., Ltd.

Original release
- Network: tvN
- Release: November 2 – November 24, 2020

Birthcare Center (Korean: 산후조리원) is a South Korean television series starring Uhm Ji-won, Park Ha-sun, Jang Hye-jin, Yoon Park and Choi Ri. The series directed by Park Su-won and written by Kim Ji-Soo revolves around Oh Hyun-jin (Uhm Ji-won), as she gets acquainted to child birth and postpartum care. It aired on tvN every Monday and Tuesday at 21:00 (KST) from November 2 to November 24, 2020.

As per Nielsen Korea, Birthcare Center ended with the audience rating of an average of 3.690% in national and 4.019% in the metropolitan area. In its last episode it recorded averages of 4.8% in the metropolitan area and 4.2% nationwide with a viewership of 1.1 million, which was its personal best. With an average viewership of 889,000 it maintained the No.1 rank in the same time zone including cable and full-length channels.

== Synopsis ==
Oh Hyun-jin (Uhm Ji-won) has a glittering career in her work life. She is the youngest member on the board of executives at the company she works at and is proficient in everything she does. But when she delivers her first child, she is in for a shock. Giving birth was far more difficult than she had expected, and she quickly discovers that although she is good at all things work-related, she hasn't got the first clue about how to bring up a baby. After being discharged from hospital, she heads to a postpartum care center – an exclusive establishment where even A-list stars come to get postpartum care. She is dismayed to realize that she is the oldest mother in the center, and embarrassed to notice that everyone else seems to know what they are doing when it comes to looking after babies. Fortunately, the other mothers at the center prove inspirational. Among their number is Cho Eun-jeong (Park Ha-sun ), aka 'the Queen Bee' – a seemingly perfect mother whom everyone wants to befriend in order to learn childcare secrets. And Choi Hye-suk (Jang Hye-jin) is the charismatic center manager, having knowledge about everything related to childcare.

== Cast ==
Cast and characters profile:

=== Main ===
- Uhm Ji-won as Oh Hyun-jin, the oldest mother and the youngest charismatic executive, who doesn't hold back. However her inexperience in having a baby makes her feel culturally shocked with the world of the mothers, in which no one cares about her job or educational background but only cares about her baby. Her inexperience results in her being outcast by the rest of the mothers.
- Park Ha-sun as Cho Eun-jeong, perfect parenting heart and "Love is Mother", a so-called first class mom who breastfeeds twins for 24 months. Everyone is willing to befriend her for her perfect parenting tips. However actually her twins are not as nice as what people see.
- Jang Hye-jin as Choi Hye-suk, president of the mothers and the director of the postpartum care center she is trusted by mothers as guide
- Yoon Park as Kim Do-yoon, Hyun-jin's handsome younger husband, CEO of an up-and-coming app development startup company.
- Choi Ri as Lee Roo-da, Yo-mi's mother who thinks of herself as much as she thinks of her child. She has strong clashes with most of the mothers in the center, especially against Eun-jeong.

=== Supporting ===
- Choi Soo-min as Ahn Hee-nam, a nurse in a postpartum care center whose voice changes suddenly with Jekyll and Hyde level. She uses her normal lower voice to talk to the mothers, while she uses nasal higher voice as sarcasm to incompetent mothers.
- Kim Min-chul as Min-soo
- Nam Yoon-su as Ha Gyeong-hoon, a handsome packet delivery boy whose presence is waited by the center's mothers and employees except Eun-jeong because he knows the secret about her twins' attitude.
- Lim Hwa-young as Park Yoon-ji
- Bae Woo-hee as Hee-won, junior to Do-yoon

=== Special appearances ===
- Kang Hong-seok as Grim Reaper, he almost takes Hyun-jin during her difficult delivery (Ep. 1)
- Jung Moon-sung as a resident specializing in obstetrics and gynecology who delivers Hyun-jin's baby (Ep. 1)
- Lee Jun-hyeok as Yang Joon-seok, a father at Serenity Birthcare Center who gives advice to Do-yoon (Ep. 2 & 5)
- Jung Yi-rang as a saleswoman who tries to sell a baby stroller to Do-yoon (Ep. 3)
- Park Si-yeon as Han Hyo-rin, an actress who struggles with her public image after giving birth (Ep. 4)
- So Joo-yeon as Alex Choi, a colleague and rival of Hyun-jin (Ep. 6)
- Kim Jae-hwa as Byun Young-mi, a selective babysitter known as the "Crouching Dragon" (Ep. 6)
- Jung Sang-hoon as a shaman who helps parents choose successful names for their children (Ep. 7)
- Mu Jin-sung as Cha Woo-seok. Lee Roo-da's boyfriend (Yo-mi's father) and Choi Hye-sook's son (Ep. 7).
- Cha Tae-hyun as Cha Tae-hyun, Ahn Hee-nam's son (Ep. 8)
- Jung Hee-tae as Roo-da's father, he abandoned his family when his daughter was young (Ep. 8)
- Yoo Ha-bok as Hyun-jin's boss (Ep. 8)
- Jung Soon-won, a prosecutor in Hyun-jin's imagination (Ep. 8)
- Jung Sung-il as Lee Seon-woo, Cho Eun-jeong's husband a famous golf player

== Episodes ==
No.	Title	Directed by	Written by	Original release date	South Korea viewers (millions)
1	"After Childbirth" (Korean: 산후 세계)	Park Su-won	Kim Ji-soo, Choi Yoon-hee & Yoon Su-min	November 2, 2020	0.897
2	"It's Like Paradise, They Said" (Korean: 조리원은 천국이라더니)	Park Su-won	Kim Ji-soo, Choi Yoon-hee & Yoon Su-min	November 3, 2020	1.056
3	"Half Person, Half Mom" (Korean: 반인반모(半人半母))	Park Su-won	Kim Ji-soo, Choi Yoon-hee & Yoon Su-min	November 9, 2020	0.722
4	"Monster" (Korean: 괴물)	Park Su-won	Kim Ji-soo, Choi Yoon-hee & Yoon Su-min	November 10, 2020	0.766
5	"The Third Gender" (Korean: 제3의 성)	Park Su-won	Kim Ji-soo, Choi Yoon-hee & Yoon Su-min	November 16, 2020	0.770
6	"A Good Mother" (Korean: 질풍노모기)	Park Su-won	Kim Ji-soo, Choi Yoon-hee & Yoon Su-min	November 17, 2020	0.953
7	"Your Name Is" (Korean: 너의 이름은)	Park Su-won	Kim Ji-soo, Choi Yoon-hee & Yoon Su-min	November 23, 2020	0.832
8	"A Mother's Film Noir" (Korean: 격정 엄마 느와르)	Park Su-won	Kim Ji-soo, Choi Yoon-hee & Yoon Su-min	November 24, 2020	1.113

== Production ==
The first script reading took place on May 6, 2020. Lim Hwa-young joined the cast in late May.

The promotional stills and teasers were released on October 15, 2020.

The series is available for streaming with English and Mandarin subtitles on iQIYI in South East Asia and Taiwan.

== Original soundtrack ==
Birthcare Center

Soundtrack album by Various Artists
- Released: 2020
- Genre: Soundtrack
- Languages: Korean; English
- Labels: Genie Music; Stone Music Entertainment

=== Part 1 ===
Released on November 10, 2020
No.	Title	Lyrics	Music	Artist	Length
1.	"Hey MAMA"	Jade, Dennis Chang	Dennis Chang, Moon Jung-wook	SAAY	3:04
2.	"Hey MAMA" (Inst.)		Dennis Chang, Moon Jung-wook		3:04
Total length:					6:08

=== Part 2 ===
Released on November 17, 2020
No.	Title	Lyrics	Music	Artist	Length
1.	"Beautiful Destiny" (소향)	Hana	Tom and Jerry, Safira.K	Sohyang	4:36
2.	"Beautiful Destiny (Inst.)"		Tom and Jerry, Safira.K		4:36
Total length:					9:12

=== Part 3 ===
Released on November 24, 2020
No.	Title	Lyrics	Music	Artist	Length
1.	"My time that was stopped again" (제인스)	Jayins	Jayins	Jayins	3:30
2.	"My time that was stopped again (Inst.)"		Jayins		3:30
Total length:					7:00

=== Score ===
Released on November 25, 2020
No.	Title	Music	Length
1.	"Postpartum Care Center (Title)"	Choi In-hee, Oh Hye-joo
2.	"Childbirth Encyclopedia"	Choi In-hee, Lee Sori
3.	"Enema's humiliation"	Choi In-hee, Lee Sori
4.	"Painless Heaven"	Choi In-hee, Lee Sori
5.	"The postpartum world"	Isori
6.	"Hello! Baby (LULLABY!)"	Choi In-hee, Oh Hye-joo
7.	"Hellgate"	Hyunjoo Kim
8.	"Up"	Isori
9.	"The time of the stormy old mother"	Isori
10.	"The old mother Jeongki Nam"	Moonjung Kim
11.	"Full-time mom vs working mom"	Oh Hye-joo
12.	"Lover"	Hyunjoo Kim
13.	"Breast milk X file"	Inhee Choi, Soori Lee
14.	"The Nameless Child"	Choi In-hee, Oh Hye-joo
15.	"Menbung period"	Choi In-hee, Lee Sori
16.	"HELL STAGE"	Choi In-hee, Lee Sori
17.	"Yumorisk"	Oh Hye-joo
18.	"Lovely Troubly"	Oh Hye-joo
19.	"Queen of lactation"	Choi In-hee, Lee Sori
20.	"STRANGE HEAVEN"	Choi In-hee, Lee Sori
21.	"Lovers at 3 PM"	Choi, Hyunil Seo
22.	"My name is me!"	Oh Hye-joo

== Viewership ==
Birthcare Center : South Korea viewers per episode (thousands)

Season	Episode number								Average
Season	1	2	3	4	5	6	7	8	Average
1	897	1056	722	766	770	953	832	1113	889

Source: Audience measurement performed nationwide by Nielsen Korea.

Average TV viewership ratings
Ep.	Original broadcast date	Average audience share (Nielsen Korea)	
Ep.	Original broadcast date	Nationwide	Seoul
1	November 2, 2020	4.186% (1st)	4.040% (1st)
2	November 3, 2020	4.044% (1st)	4.779% (1st)
3	November 9, 2020	3.031% (1st)	3.289% (2nd)
4	November 10, 2020	3.343% (1st)	3.509% (1st)
5	November 16, 2020	3.293% (1st)	3.391% (2nd)
6	November 17, 2020	3.773% (1st)	3.978% (1st)
7	November 23, 2020	3.628% (1st)	4.335% (1st)
8	November 24, 2020	4.223% (1st)	4.830% (1st)
Average		3.690%	4.019%
The blue numbers represent the lowest ratings and the red numbers represent the highest ratings.; This drama aired on a cable channel/pay TV which normally has a relatively smaller audience compared to free-to-air TV/public broadcasters (KBS, SBS, MBC and EBS).

== Awards and nominations ==
Awards	Category	Recipient	Result	Ref.
57th Baeksang Arts Awards	Best Actress	Uhm Ji-won	Nominated	
57th Baeksang Arts Awards	Best Supporting Actress	Park Ha-sun	Nominated	
