= Myung Se-bin =

South Korean actress (born 1975)

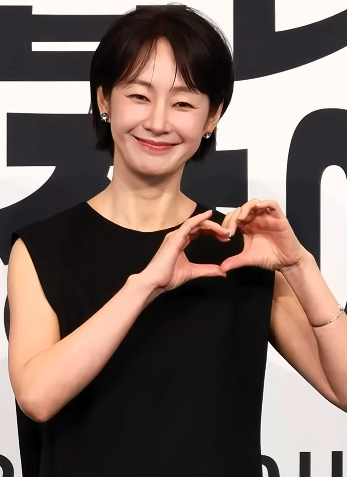
- Myung in 2025
- Born: April 10, 1975 (age 51); Nonhyeon-dong, Seoul, South Korea
- Education: Dongduk Women's University
- Occupation: Actress
- Years active: 1996–present
- Agent: Kosmo Entertainment
- Spouse: Gang Ho-sung (m. 2007; div. 2008)

Korean name
- Hangul: 명세빈
- Hanja: 明世彬
- RR: Myeong Sebin
- MR: Myŏng Sebin
- Website: kosmoent.co.kr

Myung Se-bin (Korean: 명세빈; born April 10, 1975) is a South Korean actress from the Seochok Myeong clan. She is best known for her television dramas Purity (1998), Paper Crane (1998), Into the Sun (2003), Three Sisters (2010) and Doctor Cha (2023).

== Early life and education ==
Myung Se-bin is a graduate from Dongduk Women's University.

== Career ==
Myung was spotted in 1996 at a department store in Seoul by singer Shin Seung-hun, who later cast her in his music video. She later modelled for magazines and commercials which led to an acting career.

== Personal life ==
Myung married lawyer Gang Ho-sung at the Sheraton Walkerhill Hotel on August 17, 2007. The couple divorced five months later in January 2008.

== Filmography ==
=== Film ===
Year	Title	Role	Ref.
1998	Scent of a Man	Shin Eun-hye	
1998	A Great Chinese Restaurant	Yoo Tae-hee	
TBA	The Hotel	Lee Jung-eun	

=== Television series ===
Year	Title	Role	Notes	Ref.
1998	Purity	Yoon Hye-jin		
1998	Paper Crane	Choi Na-hyun		
1999	House Above the Waves	Maria		
1999	Ghost	Seo Jae-young		
2000	She's the One	Jung Kyung-ran		
2000	Some Like It Hot	Hyun Mi-rae		
2001	I Still Love You	Oh Soon-mi		
2002	Who's My Love	Kim Go-eun		
2003	Into the Sun	Jeon Hye-rin		
2004	The Woman Who Wants to Marry	Lee Shin-young		
2005	Span Drama: "Midnight Tea Party"	cafe manager		
2005	Wedding	Shin Yoon-soo		
2006	Special of My Life	Yoon Se-ra		
2006	What's Up Fox	fashion show attendee	Cameo appearance	
2007	Prince Hours	Queen Hwa-in		
2010	Three Sisters	Kim Eun-young		
2013	The Sons	Sung In-ok		
2013	The King's Daughter, Soo Baek-hyang	Chae-hwa		
2015	Kill Me, Heal Me	Min Seo-yeon		
2017	First Love Again	Lee Ha-jin		
2017	Avengers Social Club	Lee Mi-sook		
2021	Bossam: Steal the Fate	Lady Haeindang of the Gwangju Yi clan, Yi I-cheom's sister and Dae-yeob's aunt		
2023	Doctor Cha	Choi Seung-hee		
2024	Missing Crown Prince	Queen Dowager Min Soo-ryun		
2025	The Dream Life of Mr. Kim	Park Ha-jin		

=== Music video appearances ===
Year	Title	Artist	Ref.
1996	"Love in My Own Way"	Shin Seung-hun	
1997	"Alone"	Lee Ji-hoon	
1999	"Promise"	Kim Bum-soo	

== Awards and nominations ==
Year	Awards	Category	Nominated work	Results
2017	KBS Drama Awards	Excellence Award, Actress in a Daily Drama	First Love Again	Won
2012	MBC Drama Awards	Top Excellence Award, Actress in a Serial Drama	The Sons	Nominated
2010	SBS Drama Awards	Excellence Award, Actress in a Weekend/Daily Drama	Three Sisters	Nominated
2005	KBS Drama Awards	Excellence Award, Actress	Wedding	Nominated
2004	MBC Drama Awards	Top Excellence Award, Actress	The Woman Who Wants to Marry	Nominated
2004	MBC Drama Awards	Best Couple Award with Yoo Jun-sang	The Woman Who Wants to Marry	Nominated
2004	MBC Drama Awards	Popularity Award, Actress	The Woman Who Wants to Marry	Nominated
1999	Grand Bell Awards	Best New Actress	Scent of a Man	Nominated
1999	Paeksang Arts Awards	Best New Actress (TV)	Purity	Won
1998	KBS Drama Awards	Best New Actress	Purity, Paper Crane	Won
1998	KBS Drama Awards	Photogenic Award, Actress	Purity, Paper Crane	Won
1998	Blue Dragon Film Awards	Best New Actress	Scent of a Man	Nominated
