= High Kick: Revenge of the Short Legged =

2011-12 South Korean sitcom

- Promotional poster
- Hangul: 하이킥! : 짧은 다리의 역습
- Hanja: 하이킥! : 짧은 다리의 逆襲
- RR: Haikik! : jjalbeun dariui yeokseup
- MR: Haik'ik! : tchalbŭn tariŭi yŏksŭp
- Genre: Situation comedy
- Created by: Kim Byung-wook
- Written by: Baek Sun-woo; Jang Jin-ah; Lee Young-chul
- Directed by: Kim Byung-wook; Park Soon-tae; Jo Chan-joo; Kim Yeong-gi
- Starring: Ahn Nae-sang; Yoon Yoo-sun; Yoon Kye-sang; Seo Ji-seok; Lee Jong-suk; Krystal Jung; Park Ha-sun; Baek Jin-hee; Kim Ji-won; Julien Kang; Kang Seung-yoon; Lee Juck; Park Ji-sun; Go Young-wook; Yoon Gun
- Country of origin: South Korea
- Original language: Korean
- No. of episodes: 123

Production
- Running time: 28 minutes
- Production company: Chorokbaem Media

Original release
- Network: MBC
- Release: September 19, 2011 – March 30, 2012

Related
- Unstoppable High Kick!; High Kick Through the Roof

High Kick: Revenge of the Short Legged (Korean: 하이킥! : 짧은 다리의 역습) was a South Korean sitcom that aired from 2011 to 2012. Revolving around the lives of the Ahn family and their neighbors, it explored the lives of people who are down and out and how they manage to recover.

== Plot ==
The story begins in 2041, where Lee Juck has released a best-selling novel called "High Kick: Revenge of the Short-legged". The book describes his experience with the Ahn's and Ji-won's households, the primary plot being the Ahn family's financial hardship. The story is narrated by Lee Juck himself.

The drama begins when Nae-sang's business partner, who has embezzled funds from the company, flees the country and leaves behind a mountain of debts and a horde of angry creditors. Faced with the prospect of going to debtors' prison, Nae-sang frantically collects his family (his wife in the middle of a massage session, his son during an ice hockey match and his daughter who had just arrived from LA) and escapes to the countryside.

Rendered both bankrupt and homeless, the family has no place to stay for the night after Nae Sang's plans to live with his great uncle fall through (the old man has died and sold his house). In desperation, they call Yoo Sun's younger brother, Kye-sang. They decide to move into the house he shares with Ji-seok, Yoo-sun's other younger brother.

The series follows several subplots through to their conclusion; the relationship between Ha-sun and Ji-seok, Jin-hee's search for a stable career, the one-sided love triangle between Ji-won, Jin-hee, and Kye-sang, and Jong-seok's unrequited love for Ji-won.

== Characters ==
Most characters use the actor's real name (with the exception of surnames).

=== The Ahn/Yoon house ===
Ahn Nae-sang (안내상, Ahn Nae-sang)
The head of the Ahn family. Nae Sang was scammed by a close friend out of a large sum of money. As a result, his company, Ahn Special Effects, became bankrupt, and he went on the run from his creditors. He tends to be calculating, hot-tempered, and tends to be viewed as self-centered due to his massive pride, but ultimately cares for his family. He quarrels often with his wife, although they enjoy a good relationship together. Later in the series, he develops Ahn Arts, an extra casting company, and later managed to build Ahn's World from money they won as second place in the lottery.

Yoon Yoo-sun (윤유선, Yoon Yoo-sun)
Ahn Nae-sang's wife. She developed early menopause from the stress of the bankruptcy. She is reasonable and seldom gets angry, unless provoked (usually by Nae-sang). She is a strong, resilient character. Throughout the series, she had thoughts of herself and what happened in her life.

Yoon Kye-sang (윤계상, Yoon Kye-sang)
Yoo-sun's younger brother and Ji-Seok's older brother. He is a doctor at a local community health center, previously working at a general hospital. He is cheerful, kind, and selfless, but sometimes obtuse about other people's feelings. He wears a perpetual smile on his face, even when sleeping. He always jokes around and say 농담입니다 (Nongdam-imnida) or "just kidding" while shaking his head. He demonstrates a strong sense of philanthropy, willing to help the less fortunate during his spare time, and ultimately wanted to go to Rwanda on a volunteer trip near the end of the series.

Yoon Ji-seok (윤지석, Seo Ji-seok)
Younger brother of Yoo-sun and Kye-sang. He is a gym teacher at the high school which Jong-seok and Soo-Jung attend, which is why he is called "Yoon-ssaem", or "Teacher Yoon". He can be impulsive and hot-tempered, but is generally straightforward and honest when expressing his emotions. He was secretly in love with Ha-sun, but couldn't muster up the courage to confess. He waited for Ha-sun for two months when Ha-sun's mother was in the hospital fighting cancer, and Ha-sun needs to be in the US.

Ahn Jong-seok (안종석, Lee Jong-suk)
Son of Ahn Nae-sang and Yoon Yoo-sun. He was an ice hockey star at his previous school, attending through a sports scholarship. He had trouble adjusting to academics after having been a jock his whole school career. Later, he asked his neighbor and classmate Kim Ji-won to be his tutor. He slowly develops feelings for Ji-Won even though she is unrequited towards him. He has an antagonistic relationship with his sister. His old fan club called him the "Ice Prince" but Ji-won later changed it to "Ice God", to which he liked better. He became bestfriends with Kang Seung-yoon after he saved his life.

Ahn Soo-jung (안수정, Krystal Jung)
Daughter of Ahn Nae-sang and Yoon Yoo-sun. Jong-seok's younger sister. She was an exchange student in Los Angeles, but suddenly had to stay home because of her father's financial difficulty. She is superficial and shallow at times, but is also capable of showing care and concern to people she loves, especially her dad. It is implied later through the episodes that she and Kang Seung-yoon may have feelings for one another. She then wrote a song in which the opening lines were: "Ahn Soo-jeong, Ahn Ahn, Soo-jeong, Soo-jeong".

=== Ji-won's house ===
Kim Ji-won (김지원, Kim Ji-won)
Ha Sun's cousin. Both her parents died at different points in her life. She uses an obsolete cell phone because it contains all of the messages and photos her father sent her, although later in the series receives a newer phone after her older phone stopped working. Academically and socially gifted, she is also sensitive to other people's feelings, and will find ways to cheer them up. She loves to ride her scooter even though her elders disapprove because of her narcolepsy. She is very fond of Kye-Sang and vows to follow him to Rwanda, though in the series she later on decided not to go, and in the last episode, it was implied that she "then went out of the classroom to do what really makes her happy". She inherits the house which Ha-Sun, Jin-Hee and Julien live in.

Park Ha-sun (박하선, Park Ha-sun)
She is a Korean language teacher at the same high school as Ji-Seok, which is why she is called "Pak-ssaem" or "Teacher Park". She is overly kind with a soft voice and has difficulty managing her students' behavior. She is naive and gullible and was scammed out of the school's move in money for Julien, the guest English teacher. She bears a grudge against Kye-Sang because of his pranks and overly cheerful manner.

Baek Jin-hee (백진희, Baek Jin-hee)
Ha Sun's younger school mate. She was perpetually unemployed and was forced to move out of her study dorm because she couldn't pay the rent. She has a tremendous amount of school debt, and has to be thrifty and frugal. She manages to get a paid internship at Kye-Sang's community health center. At the end of the series, she then employed at High Productions, a job she actually likes. Moreover, she then moved into a new home after getting the said new job.

Julien (줄리엔, Julien Kang)
He is a native English teacher at the same high school. He agreed to move into Ji-Won's house after Ha Sun was scammed out of the housing money intended for him. He speaks fluent Korean and is an excellent cook. He is easy-going and patient. He thinks he is best friends with Nae Sang (they actually have a friend-sign "My BF"), but Nae Sang is just exploiting him.

=== Highschool staff ===
Park Ji-sun (박지선, Park Ji-sun)
English language teacher at the high school. She is short tempered and bosses Ha Sun around. She suspects that Ha Sun and Julien are closeted couple and are living together. Later in the series, She and Julien ended up liking each other and then dated.

Yoon Gun (윤건, Yoon Gun)
A music teacher at the high school. He is reclusive and seldom speaks, but is very gifted in music. His always sits at the window sill in the teacher's office. Later in the series, he then debuted as a singer. He is angry at Ha-sun when Ha-sun encourages him to make good songs as he was "distracted by the face of Pak-ssaem" giving him encouragement.

Hong Soon-chang (홍순창, Hong Soon-chang)
The vice principal of the school. Played by the same actor who was the school administrator in the previous High Kicks.

=== Other characters ===
Kang Seung-yoon (강승윤, Kang Seung-yoon)
Jong-suk's best friend. He encountered the Ahn family when they were on the run in Gyeongsang Province and helped them out when they were in need. He speaks in the Gyeongsang dialect, and became a live-in guest in the Yoon house. He believes that the Earth is cubed, and his ambition is to become the President of Korea. He became Jong-seok's best friend when he saved him from a car accident. It is implied later through the episodes that he and Soo-jung (Krystal) may have feelings for one another. At the end of the series, it was shown that he became the president of the Republic of Korea and Soo-jung became his English translator. It was hinted that he and Soo-jung are in a relationship.
Go Young-wook (고영욱, Go Young-wook)
A tenant in the same study dorm as Jin Hee. He is preparing for the civil service entrance examination. He often quarrels with Jin-hee. He ends up dating Ha Sun when he inadvertently saves Ha Sun from drowning. He is very attracted to her, but she does not feel the same way. She is pressured into dating him by some people around her. He breaks up with her due to failing his exam, but in reality, the actor Go Young-wook was involved in a scandal involving sexual assault, resulting in being dismissed from the show.
Lee Jeok (이적, Lee Juck)
The story is told from a novel he wrote in the future. He is the head physician of a colorectal surgery clinic. He was Kye Sang's senior colleague at the hospital until Kye-sang left to offer his services to the poor and needy.

- Oh Hee-joon as Han Gyeo-re
- Yang Han-yeol as Yoon Ji-seok's admirer
- Kim Min-young as Ji-won's friend of High school
- Park Hee-jin as Ela mesma
- Taemin as Himself

== International broadcast ==
It aired on Japan cable channel KNTV.

It aired in Thailand on Workpoint TV in July 2012.

It aired in Panama on RPC-TV in upcoming 2019.

== Ratings ==
- In the table below, the blue numbers represent the lowest ratings and the red numbers represent the highest ratings.
- NR denotes that the drama did not rank in the top 20 daily programs on that date
- The broadcast was halted from February 20 to 24 due to MBC's labour union strike. A series of specials were aired instead.

Episode #	Date	Average audience share	
Episode #	Date	TNmS Ratings	
Episode #	Date	Nationwide	Seoul National Capital Area
1	2011/09/05	10.2% (14th)	11.9% (7th)
2	2011/09/06	10.4% (11th)	12.4% (8th)
3	2011/09/07	9.5% (12th)	10.9% (10th)
4	2011/09/08	11.2% (9th)	13.1% (6th)
5	2011/09/09	9.8% (12th)	11.2% (8th)
6	2011/09/12	9.7% (14th)	10.5% (10th)
7	2011/09/13	10.9% (9th)	11.9% (9th)
8	2011/09/14	10.6% (16th)	12.5% (11th)
9	2011/09/15	11.1% (10th)	12.0% (7th)
10	2011/09/16	13.1% (7th)	16.0% (5th)
11	2011/09/19	11.4% (10th)	12.8% (7th)
12	2011/09/20	9.9% (14th)	11.1% (9th)
13	2011/09/21	10.7% (11th)	11.8% (10th)
14	2011/09/22	9.7% (17th)	11.0% (12th)
15	2011/09/23	10.8% (9th)	11.3% (8th)
16	2011/09/26	10.7% (10th)	11.7% (7th)
17	2011/09/27	12.5% (10th)	13.3% (7th)
18	2011/09/28	10.1% (17th)	12.1% (8th)
19	2011/09/29	11.1% (10th)	12.8% (7th)
20	2011/09/30	10.7% (12th)	12.6% (7th)
21	2011/10/03	11.1% (13th)	12.9% (7th)
22	2011/10/04	11.0% (14th)	12.0% (13th)
23	2011/10/05	10.7% (13th)	13.4% (9th)
24	2011/10/06	9.9% (12th)	11.4% (7th)
25	2011/10/07	9.3% (19th)	11.0% (12th)
26	2011/10/10	9.9% (13th)	11.4% (9th)
27	2011/10/11	10.9% (10th)	12.3% (7th)
28	2011/10/12	10.5% (13th)	11.9% (9th)
29	2011/10/13	10.2% (14th)	12.4% (6th)
30	2011/10/14	10.2% (13th)	11.8% (6th)
31	2011/10/17	10.9% (10th)	13.5% (6th)
32	2011/10/18	13.0% (9th)	14.9% (5th)
33	2011/10/19	11.7% (10th)	12.5% (8th)
34	2011/10/20	11.9% (10th)	13.9% (5th)
35	2011/10/21	11.4% (10th)	12.1% (6th)
36	2011/10/24	10.3% (14th)	12.2% (9th)
37	2011/10/25	12.2% (10th)	14.7% (5th)
38	2011/10/26	12.3% (10th)	13.9% (6th)
39	2011/10/27	15.2% (5th)	17.1% (4th)
40	2011/10/28	11.4% (9th)	14.0% (4th)
41	2011/10/31	10.4% (14th)	11.6% (10th)
42	2011/11/01	11.4% (10th)	13.9% (5th)
43	2011/11/02	11.2% (13th)	12.3% (8th)
44	2011/11/03	12.1% (10th)	13.2% (5th)
45	2011/11/04	10.9% (9th)	12.1% (8th)
46	2011/11/07	(<8.7%) (NR)	10.9% (12th)
47	2011/11/08	11.7% (9th)	12.3% (5th)
48	2011/11/09	11.4 (10th)	12.9% (6th)
49	2011/11/10	10.8% (14th)	11.9% (7th)
50	2011/11/11	10.2% (14th)	13.5% (6th)
51	2011/11/14	12.8% (8th)	14.7% (5th)
52	2011/11/15	10.9% (16th)	13.5% (8th)
53	2011/11/16	12.4% (9th)	13.8% (5th)
54	2011/11/17	10.3% (14th)	12.2% (6th)
55	2011/11/18	10.6% (14th)	12.7% (8th)
56	2011/11/21	12.9% (7th)	14.5% (5th)
57	2011/11/22	12.8% (11th)	14.3% (7th)
58	2011/11/23	12.4% (11th)	14.0% (5th)
59	2011/11/24	11.5% (11th)	13.8% (5th)
60	2011/11/25	11.4% (14th)	13.2% (5th)
61	2011/11/28	12.1% (15th)	12.8% (12th)
62	2011/11/29	11.7 (13th)	13.1% (7th)
63	2011/11/30	10.9% (14th)	12.8% (6th)
64	2011/12/01	10.5% (13th)	12.1% (9th)
65	2011/12/02	12.3% (8th)	14.3% (5th)
66	2011/12/05	12.3% (8th)	12.9% (8th)
67	2011/12/06	9.7% (19th)	11.4% (15th)
68	2011/12/07	12.6% (8th)	14.5% (4th)
69	2011/12/08	12.5% (9th)	13.9% (5th)
70	2011/12/09	14.5% (4th)	16.6% (4th)
71	2011/12/12	13.4% (6th)	14.6% (4th)
72	2011/12/13	12.2% (11th)	14.7% (5th)
73	2011/12/14	12.7% (11th)	14.9% (5th)
74	2011/12/15	12.9% (8th)	15.8% (4th)
75	2011/12/16	14.2% (5th)	16.8% (4th)
76	2011/12/19	13.7% (6th)	15.7% (5th)
77	2011/12/20	13.2% (8th)	15.6% (4th)
78	2011/12/21	12.7%(9th)	14.6% (4th)
79	2011/12/22	12.7% (9th)	13.9% (6th)
80	2011/12/23	12.2% (14th)	13.3% (8th)
81	2011/12/26	11.8% (6th)	12.9% (5th)
82	2011/12/27	12.4% (8th)	13.1% (5th)
83	2011/12/28	12.0% (8th)	13.6% (6th)
84	2011/12/29	13.3% (5th)	14.4% (3rd)
85	2011/12/30	11.3% (13th)	12.3% (6th)
86	2012/01/02	10.9% (13th)	11.2% (10th)
87	2012/01/03	11.8% (8th)	12.6% (7th)
88	2012/01/04	11.7% (11th)	13.2% (6th)
89	2012/01/05	13.5% (9th)	13.8% (6th)
90	2012/01/06	12.6% (11th)	13.7% (7th)
91	2012/01/09	12.5% (15th)	14.3% (7th)
92	2012/01/10	14.1% (8th)	14.2% (7th)
93	2012/01/11	14.7% (6th)	15.0% (6th)
94	2012/01/12	14.6% (5th)	17.4% (4th)
95	2012/01/13	12.5% (9th)	13.5% (8th)
96	2012/01/16	11.0% (14th)	10.7% (13th)
97	2012/01/17	12.3% (10th)	11.9% (11th)
98	2012/01/18	12.9% (14th)	12.4% (9th)
99	2012/01/19	13.8% (12th)	15.4% (5th)
100	2012/01/20	11.1% (15th)	11.7% (13th)
101	2012/01/23	9.5% (20th)	11.5% (13th)
102	2012/01/24	9.6% (19th)	10.3% (12th)
103	2012/01/25	8.7% (19th)	9.0% (18th)
104	2012/01/26	9.7% (17th)	9.3% (14th)
105	2012/01/27	11.5% (17th)	13.0% (7th)
106	2012/01/30	10.1% (19th)	11.0% (11th)
107	2012/01/31	10.3% (17th)	9.9% (15th)
108	2012/02/01	12.6% (14th)	14.1% (8th)
109	2012/02/02	10.4% (17th)	10.3% (17th)
110	2012/02/03	9.8% (18th)	11.1% (11th)
111	2012/02/06	10.2% (19th)	11.7% (12th)
112	2012/02/07	8.7% (18th)	(<8.5%) (NR)
113	2012/02/08	10.2% 20th)	10.2% (16th)
114	2012/02/09	9.2% (20th)	9.3% (16th)
115	2011/02/10	9.7% (19th)	11.3% (12th)
116	2012/02/13	8.6% (20th)	9.5% (15th)
117	2012/02/14	10.6% (15th)	11.9% (9th)
118	2012/02/15	9.7% (17th)	11.3% (11th)
119	2012/02/16	10.3% (18th)	11.6% (12th)
120	2012/02/17	10.4% (18th)	12.9% (8th)
121	2012/02/20	8.5% (19th)	9.2% (18th)
122	2012/02/21	10.0% (14th)	12.4% (8th)
123	2012/02/22	11.7% (16th)	12.0% (12th)
124	2012/02/23	11.9% (14th)	12.7% (9th)
125	2012/02/24	10.6% (14th)	12.3% (9th)
126	2012/02/27	10.4% (17th)	12.2% (12th)
127	2012/02/28	9.1% (17th)	10.4% (9th)
128	2012/02/29	9.3% (19th)	9.8% (18th)
129	2012/03/01	5.6% (30th)	7.3 (31st)
