= Everybody Say Kimchi =

- Promotional poster
- Also known as: Everybody, Kimchi!; Everything Kimchi
- Genre: Family drama; Suspense; Romance; Comedy
- Written by: Won Young-ok
- Directed by: Kim Heung-dong; Lee Gye-joon
- Starring: Kim Ji-young
- Country of origin: South Korea
- Original language: Korean
- No. of episodes: 132

Production
- Executive producer: Choi Yong-won
- Producer: Kim Seo-gon
- Running time: 40 minutes
- Production company: MBC C&I

Original release
- Network: MBC TV
- Release: April 7 – October 31, 2014

Everybody Say Kimchi (Korean: 모두 다 김치) is a 2014 South Korean morning comedy-drama series starring Kim Ji-young, Kim Ho-jin, Won Ki-joon, and Cha Hyun-jung. It aired on MBC from April 7 to October 31, 2014, on Mondays to Fridays at 7:50 a.m. for 132 episodes.

== Plot ==
Yoo Ha-eun takes on the challenge of starting a kimchi business after being betrayed by her husband, lawyer Im Dong-joon. As she devotes her life to making quality kimchi, Ha-eun encounters resistance from Park Hyun-ji, the executive director of a rival conglomerate, as well as from her ex-husband. But unbeknownst to her, the owner of a neighboring farm, Shin Tae-kyung, secretly helps her and the two later fall in love.

== Cast ==
- Kim Ji-young as Yoo Ha-eun
- Kim Ho-jin as Shin Tae-kyung
- Won Ki-joon as Im Dong-joon
- Cha Hyun-jung as Park Hyun-ji
- Lee Hyo-choon as Na Eun-hee
- Yoon Hye-kyung as Yoo Ji-eun
- Seo Kwang as Jang Se-chan
- Roh Joo-hyun as Park Jae-han
- Lee Bo-hee as Ji Sun-young
- Myung Ji-yeon as Im Soo-jin
- Choi Ji-won as Im Da-yool
- Song Ah-young as Gong Ha-neul
- Park Dong-bin as Bae Yong-seok
- Lee Woong-hee
- Kim Byung-wook
- Park Cho-eun
- Noh Soo-ram
- Min Joon-hyun as lawyer colleague
- Gong Hyung-jin as Kang Se-hoon (cameo)
- Hwang Dong-joo as Joo Hyun-do (cameo)
- Park Si-eun as Han Yoon-jin (cameo)

== Awards and nominations ==
| Year | Award | Category | Recipient | Result |
|---|---|---|---|---|
| 2014 | MBC Drama Awards | Top Excellence Award, Actor in a Serial Drama | Kim Ho-jin | Nominated |
| 2014 | MBC Drama Awards | Excellence Award, Actress in a Serial Drama | Kim Ji-young | Won |
