= Drinking Solo =

2016 South Korean TV series

- Official Poster
- Also known as: Drinking Alone; Let's Drink; Honsul Couple
- Genre: Romance, Comedy, Drama, Food
- Written by: Myung Soo-hyun; Baek Seon-woo; Choi Bo-rim
- Directed by: Choi Kyu-shik; Jung Hyung-gun
- Starring: Ha Seok-jin; Park Ha-sun
- Country of origin: South Korea
- Original language: Korean
- No. of episodes: 16

Production
- Running time: 60 minutes
- Production company: CJ E&M

Original release
- Network: tvN
- Release: September 5 – October 25, 2016

Drinking Solo (Korean: 혼술남녀; RR: Honsullamnyeo) is a South Korean drama starring Ha Seok-jin and Park Ha-sun. It aired on the cable network tvN for 16 episodes from September 5 to October 25, 2016.

== Plot ==
This drama is about the slice-of-life and daily activities around the teachers, students, staffs of a private institution that prepares for civil service exam around the area of Seoul's Noryangjin. The characters like to drink alone after work for their own reasons. The story also depicts the romance between Jin Jung-suk and Park Ha-na. Jin Jung Suk (Ha Seok-jin) is a good looking and professional star lecturer. Meanwhile, Park Ha-na (Park Ha-sun) is a rookie lecturer who struggles to survive in the private institute world.

== Cast ==
=== Main cast ===
- Ha Seok-jin as Jin Jung-suk (Jin-sang)
- Park Ha-sun as Park Ha-na

=== Noryangjin Institute's teachers ===
- Hwang Woo-seul-hye as Hwang Jin-yi
- Min Jin-woong as Min Jin-woong
- Kim Won-hae as Kim Won-hae

=== Noryangjin Institute's 9th grade civil service students ===
- Gong Myung as Jin Gong-myung
- Key as Kim Ki-bum
- Jung Chae-yeon as Jung Chae-yeon
- Kim Dong-young as Kim Dong-young

=== Guest appearances ===
- Ha Yeon-soo as Hwang Joo-yeon (Kim Dong-young's girlfriend) (ep. 1, 2 & 16)
- Kim Hee-won as Jin Jung-suk's former school director (ep. 1)
- Choi Min-ho as Minho from Shinee (Kim Ki-bum's high school classmate) (ep. 5)
- Jeon So-min as Kim Won-hae's sister-in-law and Jin Jung-suk's blind date partner (ep.10)
- Jo Kwon as Kwon (fellow student at Noryangjin) (ep. 11)
- Jang Do-yeon as Seo Do yeon (Korean Professor) (ep. 12)
- Kim Ji-seok as guy at the club named Jin-sang (ep. 13)
- Jang Woo-hyuk a guy at the club (ep. 13)
- Lee Se-young as class alumni (ep. 14)
- DIA (ep. 15)
- Lee Myung-hoon as graduate from class #3 (ep. 14)
- Kim Hyun-mok as College student
- Lee Yong-yi Min Jin-woong's mother, Kim Mi-kyung

== Original soundtrack ==
Track listing

=== Part 1 ===
No.	Title	Artists	Length
1.	"I Could Leave (떠날 수 있을까)"	OKDAL	4:22
2.	"I Could Leave (떠날 수 있을까)" (Inst.)		4:22
Total length:			8:44

=== Part 2 ===
No.	Title	Artists	Length
1.	"Can I Smile? (웃어도 될까요)"	Jannabi	2:49
2.	"Can I Smile? (웃어도 될까요)" (Inst.)		2:49
Total length:			5:38

=== Part 3 ===
No.	Title	Artists	Length
1.	"Hello Love (너의 귓가에 안녕)"	Oh My Girl	3:04
2.	"Hello Love (너의 귓가에 안녕)" (Inst.)		3:04
Total length:			6:08

=== Part 4 ===
No.	Title	Artists	Length
1.	"With Me (나와)"	Vanilla Acoustic	3:23
2.	"With Me (나와)" (Inst.)		3:23
Total length:			6:46

=== Part 5 ===
No.	Title	Artist	Length
1.	"Dear My Lady (품에 안으면)"	40	4:16
2.	"Dear My Lady (품에 안으면)" (Inst.)		4:16
Total length:			8:32

=== Part 6 ===
No.	Title	Artists	Length
1.	"A Day Like Today (오늘 같은 날)"	Arie, Yoon Ji Hoon	3:16
2.	"A Day Like Today (오늘 같은 날)" (Inst.)		3:16
Total length:			6:32

Background Music

=== Background Music ===
No.	Title	Artists	Length
1.	"The Warmest Winter"	Choi In-young	2:18
2.	"Someone's Beautiful Life"	Choi In-young	3:22
3.	"Dream Of Hana"	Roh Hyung-woo	3:24
4.	"Everything Is Alright"	Lee Tae-hyun	2:22
5.	"Day Of Hana"	Roh Hyung-woo	2:23
6.	"Sorry That I'm Just Like That"	Choi In-young	4:44
7.	"Aware Of Drinking Solo"	Roh Hyung-woo	2:36
8.	"Long Day"	Yin Gyou-hwang	2:46
9.	"We Have A Fling"	Lee Tae-hyun	2:32
10.	"Have A Drink Today"	Yin Gyou-hwang	2:56
11.	"Life"	Yin Gyou-hwang	1:56
12.	"Day Goes By"	Choi In-young	3:05
13.	"Be Happy Park Hana"	Lee Tae-hyun	2:40
14.	"Drinking Solo Life"	Lee Tae-hyun	2:20
15.	"Theme Of Hana"	Yin Gyou-hwang	1:59
16.	"A Shot"	Choi In-young	2:18
17.	"Gypsy Life"	Yin Gyou-hwang	1:40
18.	"Standard Of Drinking Solo"	Roh Hyung-woo	2:48
19.	"Drinking Solo Of Good Quality"	Roh Hyung-hwang	2:31
Total length:			50:40

== Ratings ==
In this table, the blue numbers represent the lowest ratings and the red numbers represent the highest.

Ep.	Original broadcast date	Average audience share		
Ep.	Original broadcast date	AGB Nielsen		TNmS
Ep.	Original broadcast date	Nationwide	Seoul	Nationwide
1	September 5, 2016	2.922%	3.770%	3.2%
2	September 6, 2016	3.187%	4.114%	3.6%
3	September 12, 2016	2.453%	2.305%	2.9%
4	September 13, 2016	3.309%	3.607%	3.7%
5	September 19, 2016	2.556%	2.595%	2.9%
6	September 20, 2016	2.199%	2.308%	3.0%
7	September 26, 2016	3.271%	3.853%	3.9%
8	September 27, 2016	3.979%	4.797%	4.8%
9	October 3, 2016	3.624%	3.253%	4.2%
10	October 4, 2016	4.427%	5.199%	5.1%
11	October 10, 2016	3.686%	4.057%	4.8%
12	October 11, 2016	4.211%	5.323%	4.9%
13	October 17, 2016	4.045%	4.423%	4.5%
14	October 18, 2016	4.400%	4.932%	4.0%
15	October 24, 2016	3.700%	4.360%	4.0%
16	October 25, 2016	5.020%	6.348%	5.0%
Average		3.562%	4.078%	4.0%

- This drama airs on a cable channel/pay TV which normally has a relatively smaller audience compared to free-to-air TV/public broadcasters (KBS, SBS, MBC and EBS).

== Awards and nominations ==
Year	Award	Category	Nominee	Result
2017	53rd Baeksang Arts Awards	Best New Actor	Gong Myung	Nominated

== Production ==
First script reading took place June 28, 2016 at CJ E&M Center in Sangam-dong, Seoul, South Korea.
