= First Love Again =

- Promotional poster for First Love Again
- Genre: Family; Melodrama; Romance; Revenge
- Written by: Park Pil-joo
- Directed by: Yoon Chang-beom
- Starring: Myung Se-bin; Kim Seung-soo; Wang Bit-na; Park Jung-chul
- Music by: Lee Pil-ho
- Country of origin: South Korea
- Original language: Korean
- No. of episodes: 104

Production
- Executive producers: Kim Sung-geun; Lee Jae-gil
- Producers: Kang Soo-yeon; Song Min-yeob
- Running time: 35 min
- Production company: KBS Media

Original release
- Network: KBS2
- Release: November 28, 2016 – April 21, 2017

First Love Again (Korean: 다시, 첫사랑; RR: Dasi, cheotsarang; lit. 'Again, First Love') is a 2016 South Korean television series starring Myung Se-bin, Kim Seung-soo, Wang Bit-na, and Park Jung-chul. The series aired on KBS2 on Monday to Friday from 7:50 p.m. to 8:30 p.m. (KST).

== Plot ==
Lee Ha-jin has love and a talent for cooking, and is dating Cha Do-yoon, who unbeknownst to her, is the son of the chairman of LK group. Cha Do-yoon proposes to her which she accepts gladly, still unaware of his rich background. Cha Do-yoon's father wants his legitimate eldest son, Cha Do-yoon, to marry Baek Min-hui, the sole daughter and heir to Myunghua Foundation, so that he can get material benefits from her family. When both the Lee and Cha families meet at a formal meeting before the wedding, the enmity between the two is revealed, and they all disapprove of the marriage between Lee Ha-jin and Cha Do-yoon. The whole situation is further complicated by an unwanted pregnancy, with Baek Min-hui scheming to pass on her baby as Cha Do-yoon's child to keep the baby's life safe from the clutches of her mother, Chairwoman Kim of Myunghua Foundation. Will Baek Min-hui be able to separate Cha Do-yoon and Lee Ha-jin? Will Cha Do-yoon and Lee Ha-jin be able to forget their first love?

== Cast ==
=== Main cast ===
- Myung Se-bin as Lee Ha-jin
- Kim Seung-soo as Cha Do-yoon
- Wang Bit-na as Baek Min-hui
- Park Jung-chul as Choi Jung-woo

=== People around Ha-jin ===
- Lee Duk-hee as Hong Mi-ae
- Kang Seo-Ha as Chun Se-yoon
- Kang Nam-gil as Director Park

=== People around Do-yoon ===
- Kim Bo-mi as Kim Mal-soon
- Jung Han-yong as Cha Duk-bae
- Jo Eun-sook as Yoon Hwa-ran
- Yoon Chae-sung as Cha Tae-yoon
- Uhm Chae-young as Cha Hye-rin

=== People around Min-hui ===
- Seo Yi-sook as Kim Young-sook
- Kim Young-ki as President Baek

=== Others ===
- Jung Ae-yun as Mrs. Seo
- Choi Seung-hoon as Ga On
- Song Won-seok

== Ratings ==
- The blue numbers represent the lowest ratings and the red numbers represent the highest ratings
- NR denotes that the drama did not rank in the top 20 daily programs on that date

Episode #	Original broadcast date	Average audience share			
Episode #	Original broadcast date	TNmS Ratings		AGB Nielsen	
Episode #	Original broadcast date	Nationwide	Seoul National Capital Area	Nationwide	Seoul National Capital Area
1	November 28, 2016	16.7%	15.5%	14.9%	15.4%
2	November 29, 2016	16.8%	15.2%	14.0%	13.0%
3	November 30, 2016	16.6%	15.1%	14.3%	13.8%
4	December 1, 2016	16.7%	14.9%	13.7%	13.2%
5	December 2, 2016	16.0%	14.0%	13.5%	13.1%
6	December 5, 2016	17.9%	17.1%	16.0%	15.8%
7	December 6, 2016	19.2%	16.8%	14.8%	13.7%
8	December 7, 2016	16.9%	14.9%	15.1%	14.4%
9	December 8, 2016	18.2%	17.0%	15.9%	14.9%
10	December 9, 2016	15.6%	14.8%	13.7%	13.3%
11	December 12, 2016	18.8%	17.4%	16.5%	16.2%
12	December 13, 2016	18.7%	16.6%	15.6%	14.8%
13	December 14, 2016	17.3%	15.5%	15.4%	15.3%
14	December 15, 2016	18.8%	17.1%	16.6%	15.7%
15	December 16, 2016	16.7%	15.5%	15.9%	14.9%
16	December 19, 2016	17.4%	15.6%	16.9%	16.8%
17	December 20, 2016	19.3%	16.8%	16.2%	15.4%
18	December 21, 2016	18.6%	16.6%	16.6%	16.3%
19	December 22, 2016	19.1%	17.5%	17.6%	17.3%
20	December 23, 2016	18.6%	16.4%	16.1%	14.8%
21	December 26, 2016	17.9%	15.6%	17.1%	16.3%
22	December 27, 2016	20.1%	19.3%	16.9%	15.5%
23	December 28, 2016	18.3%	16.9%	17.6%	17.3%
24	December 29, 2016	19.6%	17.8%	18.1%	17.3%
25	December 30, 2016	18.3%	16.8%	17.1%	16.4%
26	January 2, 2017	19.6%	18.3%	18.2%	17.3%
27	January 3, 2017	21.0%	19.0%	18.8%	17.3%
28	January 4, 2017	20.0%	18.3%	17.9%	17.3%
29	January 5, 2017	20.1%	18.0%	18.7%	18.0%
30	January 6, 2017	20.0%	18.3%	17.1%	16.3%
31	January 9, 2017	20.1%	18.4%	18.4%	17.6%
32	January 10, 2017	20.9%	18.7%	18.6%	17.1%
33	January 11, 2017	20.1%	18.9%	19.2%	18.1%
34	January 12, 2017	21.2%	19.5%	18.7%	17.8%
35	January 13, 2017	20.4%	18.4%	17.6%	16.6%
36	January 16, 2017	21.8%	19.5%	19.5%	18.1%
37	January 17, 2017	22.1%	20.4%	19.7%	18.4%
38	January 18, 2017	20.1%	18.0%	18.5%	17.5%
39	January 19, 2017	22.2%	19.5%	18.9%	18.2%
40	January 20, 2017	18.4%	17.0%	17.3%	15.9%
41	January 23, 2017	21.6%	19.0%	19.9%	18.7%
42	January 24, 2017	21.4%	19.4%	19.2%	17.1%
43	January 25, 2017	19.7%	17.5%	18.0%	16.7%
44	January 26, 2017	20.1%	17.5%	18.7%	17.7%
45	January 27, 2017	12.9%	12.2%	11.2%	11.0%
46	January 31, 2017	21.8%	20.3%	20.6%	19.1%
47	February 1, 2017	21.1%	18.1%	19.8%	17.8%
48	February 2, 2017	21.9%	20.2%	21.7%	20.5%
49	February 3, 2017	19.2%	17.2%	19.7%	18.1%
50	February 6, 2017	19.9%	18.0%	20.5%	19.2%
51	February 7, 2017	20.5%	17.3%	20.9%	19.5%
52	February 8, 2017	21.3%	19.2%	20.7%	19.2%
53	February 9, 2017	19.9%	17.5%	20.4%	19.1%
54	February 10, 2017	20.9%	17.5%	19.7%	17.7%
55	February 13, 2017	21.4%	20.1%	21.8%	20.7%
56	February 14, 2017	20.6%	19.4%	19.9%	18.3%
57	February 15, 2017	19.4%	18.1%	19.8%	18.1%
58	February 16, 2017	21.3%	19.1%	20.7%	19.1%
59	February 17, 2017	20.5%	18.7%	20.6%	18.7%
60	February 20, 2017	19.8%	19.1%	21.8%	20.8%
61	February 21, 2017	18.8%	17.3%	20.6%	19.0%
62	February 22, 2017	20.9%	18.1%	20.4%	19.0%
63	February 23, 2017	20.7%	18.0%	21.1%	19.8%
64	February 24, 2017	21.4%	19.8%	20.6%	18.8%
65	February 27, 2017	21.1%	18.8%	20.2%	18.4%
66	February 28, 2017	21.9%	19.2%	21.6%	20.3%
67	March 1, 2017	22.0%	19.5%	22.7%	20.8%
68	March 2, 2017	22.7%	20.6%	22.5%	20.8%
69	March 3, 2017	22.1%	20.4%	20.3%	19.5%
70	March 6, 2017	21.1%	18.4%	21.4%	19.6%
71	March 7, 2017	22.0%	19.6%	22.1%	20.0%
72	March 8, 2017	21.8%	19.5%	21.8%	19.6%
73	March 9, 2017	20.7%	18.8%	22.6%	20.7%
74	March 10, 2017	19.2%	16.6%	19.1%	18.2%
75	March 13, 2017	22.4%	19.8%	21.7%	20.2%
76	March 14, 2017	23.2%	19.7%	22.7%	21.4%
77	March 15, 2017	21.6%	19.5%	21.8%	19.3%
78	March 16, 2017	25.5%	22.9%	22.6%	20.5%
79	March 17, 2017	22.7%	22.0%	20.9%	19.7%
80	March 20, 2017	24.8%	23.0%	22.9%	21.5%
81	March 21, 2017	24.1%	21.5%	23.3%	21.7%
82	March 22, 2017	25.7%	23.2%	22.4%	20.6%
83	March 23, 2017	26.0%	22.6%	23.5%	21.9%
84	March 24, 2017	24.6%	22.1%	21.5%	20.1%
85	March 27, 2017	25.5%	23.5%	23.4%	21.4%
86	March 28, 2017	25.8%	21.5%	23.5%	22.1%
87	March 29, 2017	25.6%	22.9%	22.0%	20.2%
88	March 30, 2017	25.4%	22.7%	22.2%	21.1%
89	March 31, 2017	24.4%	21.5%	22.5%	21.2%
90	April 3, 2017	25.5%	23.0%	22.5%	21.1%
91	April 4, 2017	24.2%	20.2%	21.1%	19.5%
92	April 5, 2017	24.3%	20.9%	22.4%	20.0%
93	April 6, 2017	24.4%	21.5%	21.4%	19.5%
94	April 7, 2017	23.3%	21.2%	19.8%	19.1%
95	April 10, 2017	24.6%	21.4%	20.8%	18.8%
96	April 11, 2017	24.2%	22.4%	20.5%	18.8%
97	April 12, 2017	23.8%	20.6%	20.5%	18.5%
98	April 13, 2017	23.4%	19.9%	20.9%	19.6%
99	April 14, 2017	24.3%	22.4%	21.5%	20.2%
100	April 17, 2017	26.1%	23.6%	23.7%	22.0%
101	April 18, 2017	25.6%	22.5%	22.7%	20.5%
102	April 19, 2017	23.7%	21.0%	20.0%	17.4%
103	April 20, 2017	24.0%	20.1%	21.9%	20.2%
104	April 21, 2017	24.7%	20.7%	21.4%	20.3%
Average		21.07%	18.91%	19.46%	18.20%

== Awards and nominations ==
Year	Award	Category	Nominee	Result
2017	31st KBS Drama Awards	Excellence Award, Actor in a Daily Drama	Kim Seung-soo	Won
2017	31st KBS Drama Awards	Excellence Award, Actress in a Daily Drama	Myung Se-bin	Won
2017	31st KBS Drama Awards	Best Young Actress	Uhm Chae-young	Nominated
2017	31st KBS Drama Awards	Best Couple Award	Kim Seung-soo and Myung Se-bin	Nominated
