= Three Days (TV series) =

2014 South Korean television series

- Promotional poster
- Also known as: 3 Days
- Genre: Action; Thriller
- Written by: Kim Eun-hee
- Directed by: Shin Kyung-soo; Hong Chang-wook
- Starring: Park Yoo-chun; Son Hyun-joo; Park Ha-sun; So Yi-hyun
- Country of origin: South Korea
- Original language: Korean
- No. of episodes: 16

Production
- Executive producer: Kim Young-sub
- Producers: Lee Sang-min; Song Jin-seon
- Running time: 70 minutes
- Production companies: Golden Thumb Pictures; C-JeS Entertainment

Original release
- Network: Seoul Broadcasting System
- Release: March 5 – May 1, 2014

Three Days (Korean: 쓰리 데이즈) is a 2014 South Korean action-thriller television series starring Park Yoo-chun, Son Hyun-joo, Park Ha-sun, Yoon Je-moon, So Yi-hyun, Jang Hyun-sung and Choi Won-young. It aired on SBS from March 5 to May 1, 2014 on Wednesdays and Thursdays at 9:55 p.m. for 16 episodes.

Inspired by the "real time" format of American series 24, the narrative of Three Days is divided into three parts; Part 1: The Prelude, Part 2: The Showdown, and Part 3: Judgement, with each segment lasting for 72 hours.

== Plot ==
The President of South Korea goes on holiday at a private villa. In the middle of the night, three gunshots are fired, and the president goes missing. His bodyguards, led by elite agent Han Tae-kyung, have three days to find the president and escort him safely back to the Blue House.

Three Days follows the intertwining fates of those sworn to protect the president, the president himself, his political staff, and the true power players in the shadows who decide whether he lives or dies.

== Cast ==
=== Main characters ===
- Park Yoo-chun as Han Tae-kyung
  - Nam Da-reum as young Tae-kyung
- Son Hyun-joo as Lee Dong-hwi, President of South Korea
- Park Ha-sun as Yoon Bo-won, police constable
- So Yi-hyun as Lee Cha-young, SWAT team agent
- Choi Won-young as Kim Do-jin
- Yoon Je-moon as Shin Kyu-jin, chief presidential secretary
- Jang Hyun-sung as Ham Bong-su, chief of the Presidential Security Service

=== Supporting characters ===
==== Staff of PSS ====
- Ahn Gil-kang as Kim Sang-hee, Chief Director of Presidential Bodyguards
- Kwon Min as Chief of the Situation Center
- Kim Jung-hak as Moon Sung Min
- Jo Young-jin as Blue House's Senior Civil Affairs
- Yoon Seo-hyun as president's bodyguard
- Kim Min-jae as Hwang Yoon Jae
- Park Hyuk-kwon as Goo Ja Kwang
- Jin Hyuk as Park Sang Gyu
- Kim Hak-sun as Kim Hyo Sun
- Seo Gun-woo as president's bodyguard
- Joo Yung-ho as president's bodyguard
- Kim Han-joon as president's bodyguard
- Yoo Sang-jae as team leader of 2nd support staff reporting to the president
- Yoo Jung-rae as Jung Rae

==== Extended Cast ====
- David No as Ahn Kyung-nam
- Dong Ha as Killer Yo-han
- Lee Dae-yeon as Han Ki Joon (Han Tae Kyung's father)
- Go In-bum as Yang Dae Ho
- Kim Hyung-kyu as Yo Han
- Lee Jae-yong as Choi Ji Hoon
- Min Sung-wook as Oh Young Min
- Jo Hee-bong as Lee Jae Woong
- Jung Won-joong as Kwon Jae Yun
- Lee Kyung-young as Kim Ki Bum
- Jang Dong-jik as Major Ri Chul Kyu
- Jun Jin-ki as Hwang Kyung Joon
- Nam Myung-ryul as Min Hyun Ki
- Kim Jong-soo as Byun Tae Hoon
- Jung Wook as Kwon Yong Han
- Park Sung-hoon as Lee Dong Sung
- Lee Hyun-wook as Kim Do Jin's right-hand man
- Ha Jun as Presidential guard
- Jang In-sub as Policeman
- Jin Seon-kyu as Tattoo man killer
- Kim Hak-sun
- Woo Sang-wook
- Ahn Ji-hye
- Kim Myung-jin
- Nam Moon-chul
- Heo Joon-suk
- Son Jong-hak
- Baek Seo-bin
- Lee Jae-won
- Kim Tae-yoon

== Production ==
Three Days initially encountered pre-production difficulties. After negotiations stalled between production company Golden Thumb Pictures and broadcaster SBS, on December 4, 2013, SBS removed the drama from its February 2014 programming slate. Five days later, SBS changed its mind and placed the drama back in its original airing schedule. But lead actor Park Yoochun, who had already re-adjusted his shooting schedule for the film Haemoo after the supposed cancellation of Three Days' timeslot, found the schedules of those two projects overlapping, leaving his casting uncertain. On December 20, 2013, a press release confirmed that Park was still the lead actor, and that his scheduling problems had been resolved. Park then underwent training in fighting and defense skills for his role as a presidential bodyguard. He continued filming despite suffering a shoulder injury on set.

Screenwriter Kim Eun-hee (who previously penned Sign and Phantom) had worked on the show's concept for over two years. Prior to filming, she had already written 6 episodes of the 16-episode series, in order to give the cast ample time to prepare and get into character.

The first script reading took place on November 13, 2013 at SBS Ilsan Production Center. With a budget of ₩10 billion, filming of the series began on December 26, 2013, and the broadcasting ended on May 1.

== Ratings ==
Episode #	Original broadcast date	Average audience share			
Episode #	Original broadcast date	TNmS Ratings		AGB Nielsen	
Episode #	Original broadcast date	Nationwide	Seoul National Capital Area	Nationwide	Seoul National Capital Area
1	March 5, 2014	12.8%	16.4%	11.9%	12.5%
2	March 6, 2014	12.3%	15.0%	11.1%	12.0%
3	March 12, 2014	12.5%	14.8%	11.7%	12.9%
4	March 13, 2014	14.5%	17.4%	12.7%	14.2%
5	March 19, 2014	13.0%	15.0%	12.2%	14.0%
6	March 20, 2014	12.8%	15.7%	12.9%	14.1%
7	March 26, 2014	12.4%	14.9%	11.3%	12.5%
8	March 27, 2014	12.1%	14.2%	11.0%	11.2%
9	April 2, 2014	11.3%	13.9%	10.4%	11.1%
10	April 3, 2014	12.2%	14.3%	11.9%	12.6%
11	April 9, 2014	12.0%	14.5%	11.3%	12.6%
12	April 10, 2014	12.2%	14.8%	12.0%	12.4%
13	April 23, 2014	10.5%	11.8%	11.1%	12.4%
14	April 24, 2014	11.5%	13.1%	11.9%	12.9%
15	April 30, 2014	10.9%	12.6%	12.3%	13.9%
16	May 1, 2014	13.2%	15.4%	13.8%	15.9%
Average		12.3%	14.6%	11.8%	13.0%

== Awards and nominations ==
Year	Award	Category	Recipient	Result
2014	3rd APAN Star Awards	Excellence Award, Actor in a Miniseries	Park Yoo-chun	Nominated
2014	SBS Drama Awards	Top Excellence Award, Actor in a Miniseries	Park Yoo-chun	Won
2014	SBS Drama Awards	Top Excellence Award, Actress in a Miniseries	Park Ha-sun	Nominated
2014	SBS Drama Awards	Excellence Award, Actor in a Miniseries	Son Hyun-joo	Nominated
2014	SBS Drama Awards	Excellence Award, Actress in a Miniseries	So Yi-hyun	Won
2014	SBS Drama Awards	Special Award, Actor in a Miniseries	Jang Hyun-sung	Nominated
2014	SBS Drama Awards	Top 10 Stars	Park Yoo-chun	Won
2014	SBS Drama Awards	Netizen Popularity Award	Park Yoo-chun	Nominated
2014	SBS Drama Awards	Best Couple Award	Park Yoo-chun and Park Ha-sun	Nominated

== International broadcast ==
It aired in Malaysia on ONE TV ASIA via Astro Channel 393 with English, Chinese and Malay subtitles and later on Astro Shuang Xing via Channel 324 and Channel 307 (HD) starting April 12, 2015 at 7.00 PM.

It aired in Indonesia and Singapore on ONE TV ASIA.

In China, the rights to stream the drama online were sold for US$50,000 per episode.

It aired in Japan on cable channel KNTV on Saturdays at 8:00 p.m. beginning August 9, 2014.

It aired in Thailand on PPTV HD on Mondays & Tuesdays at 9:30 p.m. from June 22 to August 18, 2015.
