= Two Wives (2009 TV series) =

- Promotional poster for Two Wives
- Genre: Melodrama; Family; Romance
- Written by: Lee Yoo-seon
- Directed by: Yoon Ryu-hae
- Starring: Kim Ji-young; Son Tae-young; Kim Ho-jin; Kang Ji-sub
- Country of origin: South Korea
- Original language: Korean
- No. of episodes: 156

Production
- Running time: 30 minutes
- Production companies: JerryBoys Contents (formerly Bloom Entertainment); Saram&Saram Ltd.

Original release
- Network: Seoul Broadcasting System
- Release: April 5 – October 30, 2009

Related
- Two Wives (Philippine adaptation)

Two Wives (Korean: 두 아내; RR: Du anae) is a 2009 South Korean television series starring Kim Ji-young, Son Tae-young, Kim Ho-jin, and Kang Ji-sub. The daily drama aired on SBS on Mondays to Fridays at 19:20 from May 4 to October 30, 2009, for 120 episodes.

The series was part of the "Wife Trilogy," which includes Temptation of Wife and Wife Returns.

== Plot ==
Kang Chul-soo (Kim Ho-jin) divorces his wife Yoon Young-hee (Kim Ji-young) to start anew with single mother Han Ji-sook (Son Tae-young), with whom he had carried on an affair. After the split, however, Chul-soo gets into a car accident and wakes up with no memory of Ji-sook. Chul-soo thinks he is still married to Young-hee, and Young-hee and everyone else can only play along while he recovers.

== Cast ==
=== Main characters ===
- Kim Ji-young as Yoon Young-hee
- Son Tae-young as Han Ji-sook
- Kim Ho-jin as Kang Chul-soo
- Kang Ji-sub as Song Ji-ho

=== Supporting characters ===
Yoon family

- Andy Lee as Yoon Nam-joon, Young-hee's younger brother
- Jeon Moo-song as Yoon Jang-soo, Young-hee's father
- Jo Yang-ja as Seo Yeo-ja, Young-hee's mother

Kang family

- Kim Yoon-kyung as Kang Do-hee
- Kim Yong-rim as Jang Young-ja, Chul-soo's mother
- Kang Sung-jin as Ahn Kyung-tae
- Kim Young-ran as Oh Dal-ja
- Uhm Min-woo as Kang Han-byul, Young-hee and Chul-soo's son

Han family

- Kim Su-jung as Han So-ri, Ji-sook's daughter

Extended cast

- Lee Yoo-jin as Jo Mi-mi
- Choi Won-young as Lee Young-min
- Go Jung-min as Yoo Young-sun
- Yoon Ji-min as Oh Hye-ran
- Kim Hye-ok as Ji-ho's mother
- Kim Na-young as Oh Ae-rang
- Jung Tae-won as Dong-joon
- Seol Ji-yoon as Dong-joon's mother
- Jang Joon-ho as editor
- Kang Soo-han as editor's son
- Jung Ji-ah as Se-ri
- Jung Chi-in
- Min Ah-ryung
- Jeon Sung-hwan
- Yang Hee-kyung

== Notes ==
- This was actress Son Tae-young's return to the small screen after marrying Kwon Sang-woo and giving birth to a son.
- Actress Kim Ji-young's real-life mother-in-law, Kim Yong-rim, portrayed her mother-in-law in this drama as well.

== Awards ==
- 2009 SBS Drama Awards: Best Young Actress – Kim Su-jung

== Adaptation ==
In 2014, ABS-CBN produced a Philippine remake based on Two Wives. The adaptation was originally aired from October 13, 2014, to March 13, 2015.
