= Kim Ho-jin =

South Korean actor and television host

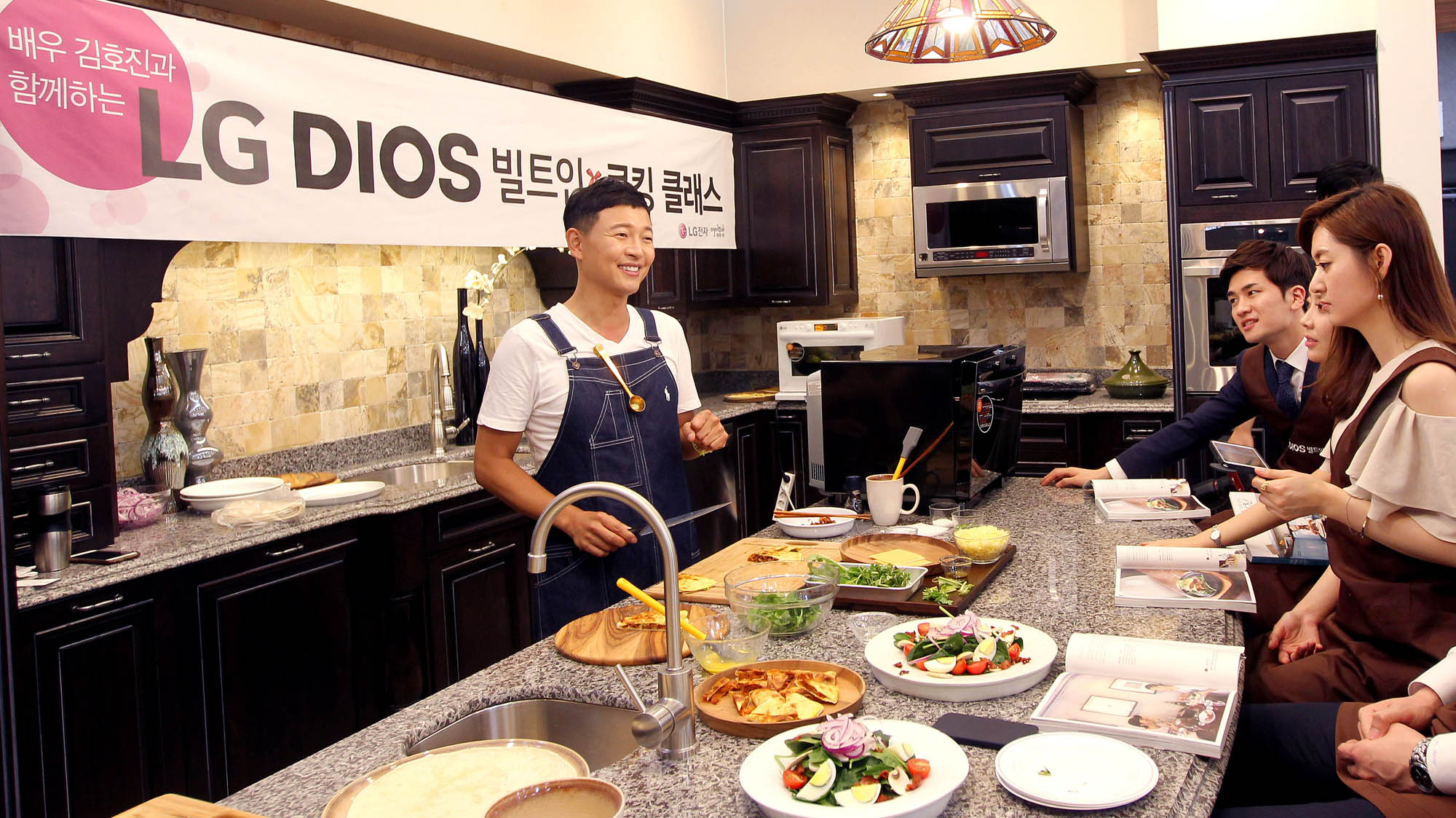
- Kim in 2015
- Born: May 5, 1970 (age 56); South Korea
- Education: Seoul Institute of the Arts - Film, Sejong Cyber University - Finance and Insurance, Chung-Ang University Graduate School of Performing Arts and Media - Master's degree in Film Studies
- Occupation: Actor
- Years active: 1990–present
- Spouse: Kim Ji-ho (m. 2001)
- Children: 1

Korean name
- Hangul: 김호진
- Hanja: 金鎬眞
- RR: Gim Hojin
- MR: Kim Hojin

Kim Ho-jin (born May 5, 1970) is a South Korean actor and food show host. Kim has played leading roles in the television dramas Tender Hearts (2001), Sunshine Hunting (2002), Yellow Handkerchief (2003), New Wise Mother, Good Wife (also known as Modern Housewives, 2007), Two Wives (2009), Can't Live Without You (2012), and Everybody Say Kimchi (2014).

He married actress Kim Ji-ho on December 11, 2001, at the Millennium Seoul Hilton Hotel. Their daughter was born on April 8, 2004. The couple met while shooting More Than Love in 2000.

== Filmography ==
=== Television series ===
Year	Title	Role	Network
1991	Maclang Era		KBS1
1993	Hope		KBS2
1993	Never on Sunday		KBS2
1993	Good Morning Yeong-dong		KBS2
1993	When I Miss You		KBS1
1994	Police	Bae Do-hyeop	KBS2
1995	Love and Marriage	Park Young-min	MBC
1995	LA Arirang		SBS
1995	Men of the Bath House	Kim Min-ki	KBS2
1997	Spring Day	Jang Dae-soo	KBS2
1997	The Reason I Live	Kim Kwang-pal	MBC
1997	Star		KBS2
1997	Because I Love You	Joon-ho	SBS
1998	Love Is All I Know		MBC
1998	Forever Yours	Jang Min-hyuk	MBC
1998	Romance	Lee Hyun-se	SBS
1999	Waves	Park Young-no	SBS
2000	KBS TV Novel: Dandelion	Song Gil-nam	KBS1
2000	More Than Love	Kim Dong-hee	MBC
2000	Ajumma	Kang Soo-hwan	MBC
2001	Tender Hearts	Han Dong-wook	KBS1
2002	Sunshine Hunting	Kang Dong-wook	KBS2
2002	Rustic Period	Kim Tae-seo	SBS
2003	Yellow Handkerchief	Lee Sang-min	KBS1
2004	Little Women	Park Seon-woo	SBS
2006	Seoul 1945	Lee Dong-woo	KBS1
2007	New Wise Mother, Good Wife	Heo Myung-pil	MBC
2008	Things We Do That We Know We Will Regret	Man (episode 2: "One Day and Again Another Day")	KBS2
2009	Empress Cheonchu	Wang Wook/Prince Gyeongju	KBS2
2009	Two Wives	Kang Chul-soo	SBS
2011	Garden of Heaven	Kang Tae-sub	Channel A
2012	Can't Live Without You	Hyun Tae	MBC
2014	Everybody Say Kimchi	Shin Tae-kyung	MBC
2015	My Daughter, Geum Sa-wol	Geum Hyung-sik	MBC
2017	The Emperor: Owner of the Mask		MBC
2017	The King in Love	Wang Young	MBC
2019	Everybody Says Kungdari	Han Soo Ho	MBC
2021	Melancholia	Baek Min-sik	tvN

=== Film ===
Year	Title	Role
1990	Madame Aema 4	
1991	Madame Aema 5	
1994	The Story of Two Women	
1994	Love on a Rainy Day	Wang Beom-soo
1997	Mister Condom	Sung-ho
2014	Venus Talk	Gu Dong-wook

=== Variety show ===
Year	Title	Network	Notes
2007	Kim Ho-jin's Cook and Talk	MBC Every 1	Host
	Find! Delicious TV	MBC	Host
2008	Tokyo Wine Diary	O'live TV	
2009	Body, Ruled by Food	KBS1	Host
2009	Kim Ho-jin's Lunch Box	O'live TV	
2011	Tasty Road 2	O'live TV	Host
2012	Olive Show	O'live TV	Jury member
2012	Kitchen Fighter	O'live TV	Jury member
2013	K-Food World Festival: Tasty Challenge	MBC	Host

== Awards and nominations ==
Year	Award	Category	Nominated work	Result
1994	KBS Drama Awards	Best New Actor		Won
2001	KBS Drama Awards	Excellence Award, Actor	Tender Hearts	Won
2003	KBS Drama Awards	Top Excellence Award, Actor	Yellow Handkerchief	Won
2008	KBS Drama Awards	Best Actor in a One-Act/Special/Short Drama	Things We Do That We Know We Will Regret	Nominated
2009	SBS Drama Awards	Excellence Award, Actor in a Serial Drama	Two Wives	Nominated
2009	KBS Drama Awards	Best Couple Award with Shin Ae	Empress Cheonchu	Nominated
2012	MBC Drama Awards	Top Excellence Award, Actor in a Serial Drama	Can't Live Without You	Nominated
2014	MBC Drama Awards	Top Excellence Award, Actor in a Serial Drama	Everybody Say Kimchi	Nominated
2019	MBC Drama Awards	Top Excellence Award, Actor in a Weekend/Daily Drama	Everybody Say Kungdari	Nominated
