= Kim Ji-ho =

South Korean actress (born 1974)

Kim Ji-Ho
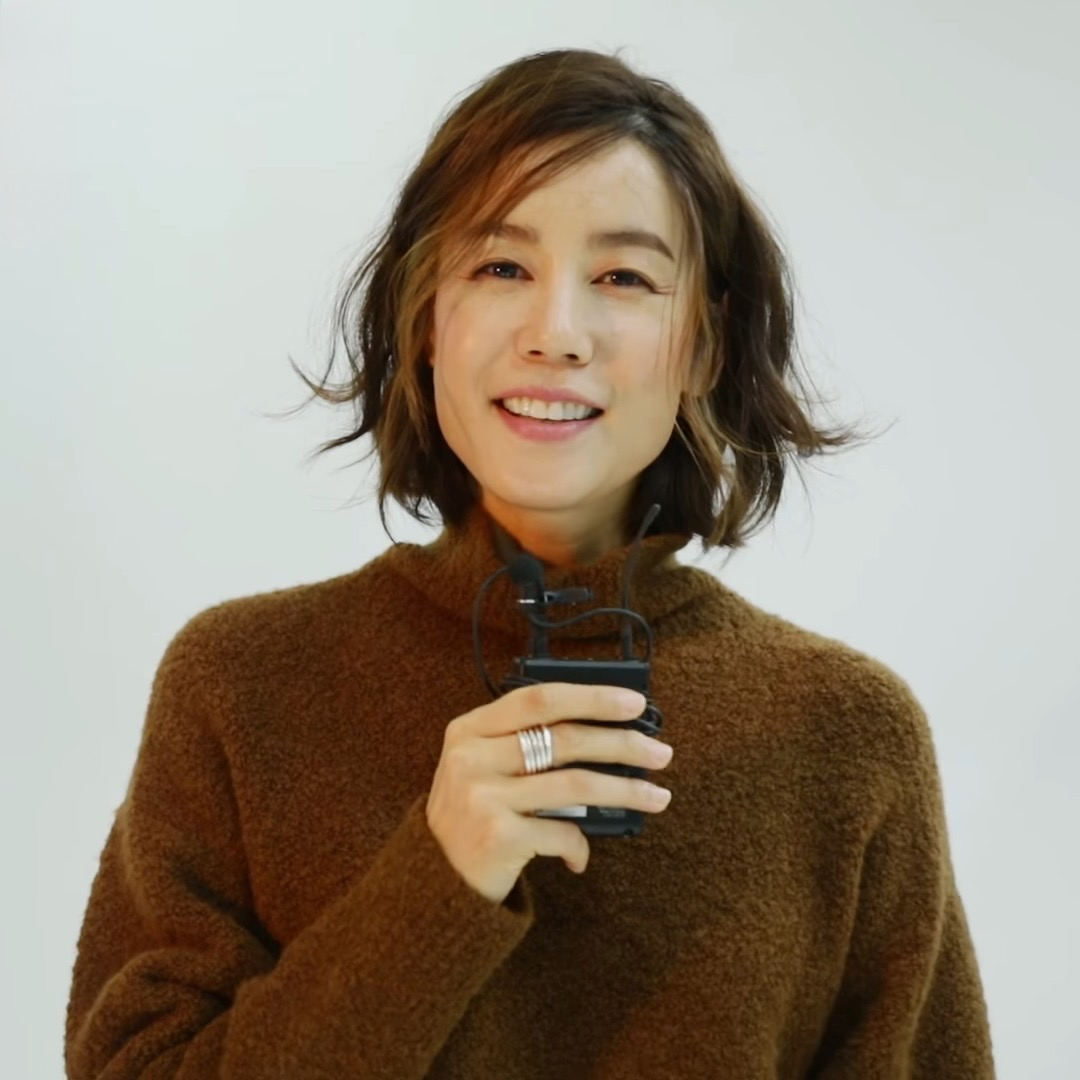
- Kim in 2018
- Born: July 22, 1974 (age 52); Seoul, South Korea
- Education: Seoul Women's University – Department of English Language and Literature
- Occupation: Actress
- Years active: 1994–present
- Agent: Inyeon Entertainment
- Spouse: Kim Ho-Jin (m. 2001)
- Children: 1

Korean name
- Hangul: 김지호
- Hanja: 金志祜
- RR: Gim Jiho
- MR: Kim Chiho

Kim Ji-Ho (Korean: 김지호; born July 22, 1974) is a South Korean actress.

== Career ==
Audiences were first introduced to Kim Ji-ho in 1994 in Shin Seung-hun's music video "For a Long Time Afterwards." She made her acting debut in Salut D'Amour that year, followed by the films A Man Wagging His Tail (1995) and Destiny (1997), both with Park Joong-hoon. Her popularity rose after starring in the 1995 television drama Apartment, and in 1996 she appeared in commercials for more than 30 products, including Kia Avella, Amorepacific Laneige, LG Corp, and Lotte Department Store. Kim's career later slowed down, but she continues to play leading roles in TV dramas such as Law Firm (2001), Glass Slippers (2002), Affection (2002), Single Again (2005), Even So Love (2007), and You Don't Know Women (2010).

Kim has also acted in Korean stagings of Closer (2006) and Proof (2008), and had a supporting role in the critically acclaimed sleeper hit Unbowed (2012).

== Personal life ==
Kim Ji-Ho married actor Kim Ho-Jin on December 11, 2001 at the Millennium Seoul Hilton Hotel. Their daughter was born on April 8, 2004. The couple met while shooting More Than Love in 2000.

== Filmography ==
=== Television series ===
Year	Title	Role	Network
1994	Salut D'Amour	Jegal Jong-Nam	KBS2
1995	TV City	Hong Hye-Joon	MBC
1995	Apartment	Jeon Hyun-Ah	MBC
1995	Two Dads		MBC
1996	August Bride	Jin-Kyung (past); Ga-Young (present)	SBS
1997	Palace of Dreams	Oh Jung-Min	SBS
1998	I Love You, I Love You	Lee Joo-Young	SBS
1999	Should My Tears Show	Kim Young-Eun	MBC
2000	More Than Love	Seo Kyung-Joo	MBC
2001	Law Firm	Park Jung-Ah	SBS
2002	Glass Slippers	Kim Tae-Hee	SBS
2002	Affection	Cha Mi-Yeon	SBS
2005	Single Again	Jung Geum-Joo	SBS
2007	Even So Love	Lee Hyo-Eun	MBC
2010	You Don't Know Women	Lee Min-Jung	SBS
2014	Wonderful Days	Kang Dong-Ok	KBS2
2015	My Daughter, Geum Sa-wol	Kim Ji-Young (guest)	MBC
2016	Happy Home	Han Mi-Soon	MBC

=== Films ===
Year	Title	Role
1995	A Man Wagging His Tail	Young-Eun
1997	Destiny	Yang-Hee
2011	Sorry and Thank You	Oh Soo-Young
2012	Unbowed	Jang Eun-Seo
2016	Unforgettable	Gil-Ja (adult)
2017	Steel Rain	Choi Soo-hyun
2021	Hard Hit	Park Yeon-su, Seong-gyu's wife

=== Variety shows ===
Year	Title	Notes
1995	Five Episodes of Youth	Host
1998	Sisa Touch Comedy File with Seo Se-Won and Kim Ji-Ho	Host
1998	Music Bank	Host
2007	Bangkok Cook & Look with Kim Ho-Jin and Kim Ji-Ho	Host
2010	Happy Birthday	Host

=== Music video appearance ===
Year	Song title	Artist
1994	"For a Long Time Afterwards"	Shin Seung-hun

== Theater ==
Year	Title	Role
2006	Closer	Park Tae-Hee ("Anna")
2008	Proof	Catherine

== Awards and nominations ==
Year	Award	Category	Nominated work	Result
1995	TV Journal Awards	Star of the Year	—N/a	Won
1995	MBC Entertainment Awards	Best Newcomer	Five Episodes of Youth	Won
1997	Korea Model Center	Best Dressed (Special Award)	—N/a	Won
2002	10th SBS Drama Awards	Excellence Award, Actress in a Drama Special	Affection	Won
2008	2nd Korea Drama Awards	Excellence Award, Actress	Even So Love	Nominated
2010	18th SBS Drama Awards	Excellence Award, Actress in a Weekend/Daily Drama	You Don't Know Women	Nominated
2011	9th Korea Green Foundation Anniversary	Green Santa Prize	—N/a	Won
2014	3rd APAN Star Awards	Best Supporting Actress	Wonderful Days	Nominated
2014	28th KBS Drama Awards	Excellence Award, Actress in a Serial Drama	Wonderful Days	Won
2016	35th MBC Drama Awards	Golden Acting Award, Actress in a Serial Drama	Happy Home	Won
