= Kim Ji-young (actress, born 1974) =

South Korean actress (born 1974)

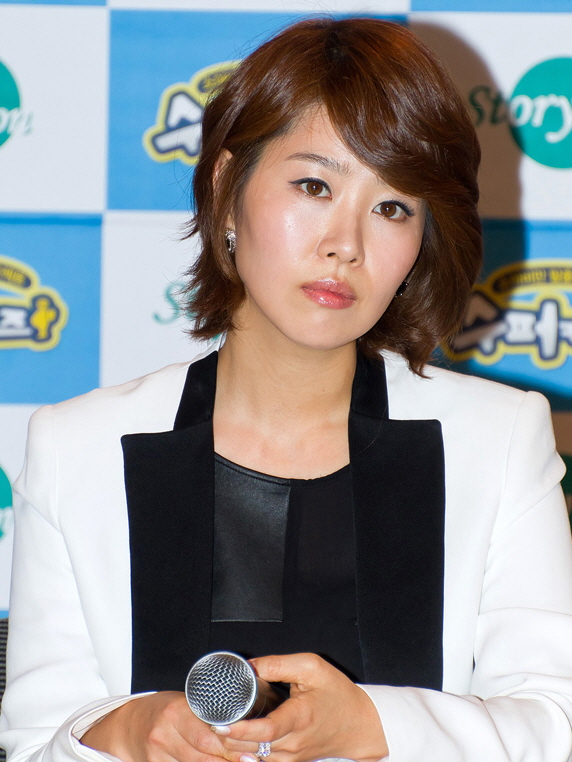
- Kim in March 2011
- Born: September 7, 1974 (age 52); Okcheon County, North Chungcheong Province, South Korea
- Education: Hanyang University ERICA Campus - Cultural Anthropology
- Occupation: Actress
- Years active: 1995–present
- Agent: Urban Works Entertainment
- Spouse: Nam Sung-jin (m. 2004)

Korean name
- Hangul: 김지영
- Hanja: 金志映
- RR: Gim Jiyeong
- MR: Kim Chiyŏng

Kim Ji-young (Korean: 김지영; born September 7, 1974) is a South Korean actress. She won several Best Supporting Actress awards for playing an indomitable handball player in the 2008 sports drama Forever the Moment. Kim also starred in leading roles in the televisions series My Lovely Fool (2006), Two Wives (2009), Marry Me, Please (also known as All About Marriage, 2010), and Everybody Say Kimchi (2014), as well as the film Touch (2012).

== Filmography ==
=== Film ===
| Year | Title | Role | Notes/Ref. |
|---|---|---|---|
| 1998 | If It Snows on Christmas | Ji-won | |
| 2003 | Happy Ero Christmas | Park Hyang-sook | |
| 2004 | Don't Tell Papa | Cho-won's homeroom teacher | |
| 2005 | Wet Dreams 2 | Biology teacher | |
| 2005 | Innocent Steps | Police officer in married disguise | |
| 2006 | Nasiriyah | Publisher colleague | Short film |
| 2006 | Old Miss Diary - Movie | Kim Ji-young | Cameo |
| 2008 | Forever the Moment | Song Jeong-ran | |
| 2010 | Cyrano Agency | Yoo-mi | |
| 2012 | All About My Wife | Radio show writer Song | |
| 2012 | Horror Stories | Hyun-soo's mother | Segment: "Ambulance on the Death Zone" |
| 2012 | Touch | Lee Soo-won/Park Joo-mi | |
| 2012 | Modern Family | Ji-won | Segment: "Star Shaped Stain" |
| 2014 | The Plan Man | Psychiatrist | |
| 2016 | Will You Be There? | Veterinarian | Cameo |
| 2017 | Room No.7 | | Cameo |
| 2018 | The Vanished | Doctor Cha | Special appearance |
| 2019 | Extreme Job | Chief Go's wife | |
| 2019 | Exit | Jung-hyun | |
| 2022 | 2037 | Kyung-sook / Yoon-young's mother | |
| 2023 | My Heart Puppy | Seon-mi | Cameo |
| 2023 | Because I Hate Korea | Kim Tae-eun | |
| 2023 | Single in Seoul | | pre-production |
| 2025 | Love Untangled | Bok-Hee | |

=== Television series ===
| Year | Title | Role |
|---|---|---|
| 1995 | Drama Game: "The Man Who Wakes Up Happiest" | |
| 1995 | Good Man, Good Woman | Kang-ja |
| 1995 | Daughter-in-law's Three Kingdoms | Korean daughter-in-law |
| 1996 | MBC Best Theater: "Made for Each Other" | |
| 1996 | Country Diaries | Bok-gil |
| 1996 | Reporting for Duty | Lee Hwi-jae's girlfriend |
| 1997 | Medical Brothers | Kim Young-ki |
| 1997 | Heroic Rebellion | Mi-sook |
| 1997 | You and I | Mi-sook |
| 1997 | New York Story | |
| 1998 | Run Barefoot | Na Chae-dan |
| 1998 | Love and Success | Gil-ja |
| 1999 | Tomato | Yoon Se-ra |
| 1999 | Love in 3 Colors | Yang Mi-ri |
| 1999 | I'm Still Loving You | Baek Jang-mi |
| 1999 | Oh! Happy Day | |
| 2000 | Nonstop | |
| 2000 | Mom and Sister | Jang Nam-kyeong |
| 2001 | Year of the Dragon Year of the Dog | Gyeon-sook |
| 2001 | Cool | Choi Se-ra |
| 2001 | When You Miss Someone | |
| 2001 | Everyday with You | Jung Ji-yeon |
| 2002 | Present | Yoo Mi-ran |
| 2003 | Swan Lake | Go Eun-ah |
| 2003 | Violet | Eun-soo |
| 2004 | Beijing My Love | Ri Young-hee |
| 2004 | Old Miss Diary | Kim Ji-young |
| 2004 | Toji, the Land | Mr. Kim's wife |
| 2004 | 4 Idiots | Seo Young-joo |
| 2005 | MBC Best Theater: "I'm Going to Movania Now" | Ji-won |
| 2006 | MBC Best Theater: "Hi, Angel" | Ae-shim |
| 2006 | Love Can't Wait | Kang Hee-jung |
| 2006 | My Lovely Fool | Jin Cha-yeon |
| 2008 | On Air | Herself (cameo, episode 1) |
| 2009 | Two Wives | Yoon Young-hee |
| 2010 | Marry Me, Please | Nam Jung-im |
| 2012 | May Queen | Lee Bong-hee |
| 2013 | My Kids Give Me a Headache | Ahn So-young's friend (cameo) |
| 2014 | KBS Drama Special: "First Birthday" | Jung-sook |
| 2014 | Everybody Say Kimchi | Yoo Ha-eun |
| 2015 | The Great Wives | Jo Kyung-soon |
| 2016 | The Love Is Coming | Lee Eun-hee |
| 2020 | Good Casting | Hwang Mi-soon / Gi Mi-sun |
| 2020 | Graceful Friends | Ji Myung-sook |
| 2021 | Country Diaries 2021 | Bok-gil |
| 2022 | Link: Eat, Love, Kill | Hong Bok-hee |

=== Web series ===
| Year | Title | Role | Ref. |
|---|---|---|---|
| 2022 | Monstrous | Han Seok-hee | |

=== Variety/radio shows ===
| Year | Title | Notes |
|---|---|---|
| 1998 | TV Loaded with Love | Host |
| 2008 | Kim Ji-young and Nam Sung-jin's Joa Joa | DJ |
| 2011 | Escape Obesity Project for Kids | Host |
| 2012 | Food Talk Plus | Host |
| 2012 | Hometown Theater | Narration |
| 2015 | Real Men: Female Soldier Special - Season 2 | Cast member |

== Theater ==
| Year | Title | Role |
|---|---|---|
| 2007 | Mong-yeon: A Love in Dreams | |
| 2007 | Sweet Goodbye | |

== Awards and nominations ==
| Year | Award | Category | Nominated work | Result |
|---|---|---|---|---|
| 1997 | MBC Drama Awards | Best New Actress | You and I | Won |
| 1998 | 34th Baeksang Arts Awards | Best New Actress (TV) | You and I | Won |
| 2006 | SBS Drama Awards | Excellence Award, Actress in a Serial Drama | My Lovely Fool | Won |
| 2008 | 16th Chunsa Film Art Awards | Best Supporting Actress | Forever the Moment | Won |
| 2008 | 17th Buil Film Awards | Best Supporting Actress | Forever the Moment | Nominated |
| 2008 | 9th Busan Film Critics Awards | Best Supporting Actress | Forever the Moment | Won |
| 2008 | 45th Grand Bell Awards | Best Supporting Actress | Forever the Moment | Nominated |
| 2008 | 29th Blue Dragon Film Awards | Best Supporting Actress | Forever the Moment | Won |
| 2008 | 7th Korean Film Awards | Best Supporting Actress | Forever the Moment | Won |
| 2009 | 3rd Asian Film Awards | Best Supporting Actress | Forever the Moment | Nominated |
| 2009 | SBS Drama Awards | Excellence Award, Actress in a Serial Drama | Two Wives | Nominated |
| 2010 | KBS Drama Awards | Top Excellence Award, Actress | Marry Me, Please | Nominated |
| 2010 | KBS Drama Awards | Excellence Award, Actress in a Daily Drama | Marry Me, Please | Won |
| 2014 | 3rd APAN Star Awards | Excellence Award, Actress in a Serial Drama | Everybody Say Kimchi | Nominated |
| 2014 | MBC Drama Awards | Excellence Award, Actress in a Serial Drama | Everybody Say Kimchi | Won |
| 2016 | SBS Drama Awards | Excellence Award, Actress in a Serial Drama | The Love is Coming | Won |
| 2020 | SBS Drama Awards | Excellence Award, Actress in a Miniseries Genre/Action Drama | Good Casting | Nominated |
