= Kim Su-jung =

South Korean actress (born 2004)

Kim Soo-jung
- Born: April 9, 2004 (age 21); Incheon, South Korea
- Education: School of Performing Arts Seoul
- Occupation: Actress
- Years active: 2008–2019
- Agent: DH Entertainment

Korean name
- Hangul: 김수정
- RR: Gim Sujeong
- MR: Kim Sujŏng

Kim Soo-jung (Korean: 김수정; born April 9, 2004) is a South Korean former actress. Kim began her career as a child actress, and has starred in television series and films, such as Two Wives (2009), Pink Lipstick (2011) and Champ (2011). She is also known as host for one of segments in Star Golden Bell.

== Filmography ==
=== Film ===
Year	Title	Role
2011	Champ	Lee Ye-seung
2019	Rainbow Playground	Hye-jin

=== Television series ===
Year	Title	Role
2008	My Precious You	Lee Ji-woo
2009	Two Wives	Han So-ri
2011	Pink Lipstick	Park Na-ri
2015	Enchanting Neighbor	Seo Yu-na

=== Variety show ===
Year	Title	Notes
2011	101 Secrets to Wake Our Child's Brain	
2013	Olala School	Cast member
2017–18	Leaving the Nest 2	Cast member
2019	Thought of Children	Cast member

== Awards and nominations ==
Year	Award	Category	Nominated work	Result
2009	SBS Drama Awards	Best Young Actress	Two Wives	Won
