= You Don't Know Women =

- Promotional poster
- Also known as: Don't Know Her; Conditions of Happiness
- Genre: Drama; Romance; Family
- Written by: Kim Young-in
- Directed by: Bae Tae-sup
- Starring: Kim Ji-ho; Go Se-won; Im Ho
- Country of origin: South Korea
- Original language: Korean
- No. of episodes: 109

Production
- Producer: Oh Se-kang
- Production location: Korea
- Running time: Mondays to Fridays at 08:40 (KST)

Original release
- Network: Seoul Broadcasting System
- Release: 2 August – 31 December 2010

You Don't Know Women (Korean: 여자를 몰라; RR: Yeojareul molla) is a television drama series from South Korea starring Kim Ji-ho, Go Se-won and Im Ho. The morning soap opera aired on SBS on Mondays to Fridays at 8:40 a.m. from August 2 to December 31, 2010 for 109 episodes.

== Cast ==
Lee family

- Kim Ji-ho as Lee Min-jung
- Lee Kyung-jin as Han Pyung-ja
- Goo Seung-hyun as Lee Sa-rang (Min-jung's son)

Park family

- Go Se-won as Park Moo-hyuk
- Gi Ju-bong as President Park

Kang family

- Im Ho as Kang Sung-chan
- Chae Min-seo Oh Yoo-ran
- Moon Ji-in as Oh Kyung-ran
- Im Ye-jin as Jang Geum-sook
- Lee Jung-gil as Kang Gyo-jang

Extended cast

- Jung Kyung-soon as Go Mi-ae
- Park Jung-woo as Ma Kang-soo
- Baek Seung-hyeon as Kim Jin-woo
- Park Sun-joon as Jin Sung-mo
- Park Young-jin as Joo Ki-ja
- Ji Yoo as Jang Eun-young
- Son Jung-min
- Kim Ga-eun

== See also ==
- List of South Korean television series
