= Kim Young-ran (actress) =

South Korean actress (born 1956)

- Born: August 19, 1956 (age 70); Seoul, South Korea
- Occupation: Actress
- Years active: 1974–present
- Agent: PK Entertainment

Korean name
- Hangul: 김영란
- Hanja: 金英蘭
- RR: Gim Yeongran
- MR: Kim Yŏngnan

Kim Young-ran (Korean: 김영란; born August 19, 1956) is a South Korean actress. Kim dropped out of Konkuk University in 1976 to pursue an acting career. She enjoyed her heyday as a leading actress in the late 1970s to the early 1980s, and continues to be active in supporting roles in television dramas until the present.

== Filmography ==
=== Television series ===
Year	Title	Role	Network
1978	Ok-nyeo	Ok-nyeo	MBC
1978	Yeon-ji	Yeon-ji	MBC
1978	Smile		MBC
1979	Anguk-dong Lady	Lady Hyegyŏng	MBC
1979	White Dandelion		MBC
1980	Country Diaries	Second daughter Young-sook	MBC
1981	Sae-ah		MBC
1981	Mischievous Milady	Jeong Nan-jeong	MBC
1981	Angry Eyes		MBC
1983	The Tale of Attendant Bae	Ae-rang	MBC
1983	500 Years of Joseon: "The King of Chudong Palace"	Queen Wongyeong	MBC
1984	Diary of a Devoted Wife		MBC
1985	500 Years of Joseon: "The Wind Orchid"	Jeong Nan-jeong	MBC
1986	Winter Flower		MBC
1987	The Last Witness	Son Ji-hye	MBC
1988	Sand Castle		MBC
1989	Winter Mist	Hye-ryun	MBC
1989	Your Toast		MBC
1990	500 Years of Joseon: "Daewongun"	Cho-wol, lover of Heungseon Daewongun	MBC
1991	Do You Know Eun Ha-su	Yoon Ji-sun	SBS
1993	Love That Can't Be Stopped	Young-ok	KBS2
1994	Han Myung-hoi	Dowager Queen Insu	KBS2
1995	Good Man, Good Woman		KBS2
1995	Always Blue Hearts	Byung-hee's mother	EBS
1996	Tears of the Dragon	Queen Sindeok	KBS1
1996	Landscaping with My Wife		KBS2
1996	Eun Ha-su	Sung-ja	KBS1
1996	Helpless Mom		SBS
1996	Under Seoul's Sky	Woo Myung-sook	MBC
1997	Yesterday	Hong Kyung-ae	MBC
1997	Passionate Love		KBS2
1998	As We Live Our Lives		KBS2
1999	Roses and Bean Sprouts	Kang Soo-ok	MBC
1999	Into the Sunlight	Han Eun-ok	MBC
2000	Look Back in Anger	Shin Jung-hee's mother	KBS2
2000	Tough Guy's Love	Moon Sung-ja	KBS2
2000	KBS TV Novel: "Dandelion"		KBS1
2000	KBS TV Novel: "Admonitions on Governing the People"	Queen Jeongsun	KBS2
2000	The Golden Era		MBC
2001	Ladies of the Palace	Jeong Nan-jeong's mother	SBS
2001	My Heart's Jewelry Box	Park Eun-shil	MBC
2001	Four Sisters	Yeo-jin, Dr. Jung's wife	MBC
2002	Sweet Home	Young-shil	MBC
2002	Orange	Kim Young-ran	SBS
2002	Ice Flower	Choi Do-ran	SBS
2002	Royal Story: Jang Hui-bin	Princess Sukan	KBS2
2003	The Bean Chaff of My Life	Gu Sook-hee	MBC
2003	Swan Lake	Heo Young-ae	MBC
2003	Something About 1%	Jung Mi-jung	MBC
2003	Pretty Woman	Hong Hyang-sook	MBC
2004	Beautiful Temptation	Kang Min-woo's mother	KBS2
2004	Island Village Teacher	Jang Jae-doo's mother	SBS
2004	Save the Last Dance for Me	Ms. Park	SBS
2005	5th Republic	Lee Soon-ja	MBC
2005	Autumn Shower	Kang Hyung-sook	MBC
2005	Dear Heaven	Bong Eun-ji	SBS
2006	A Woman's Choice	Ji Sun-young	KBS2
2007	Moon Hee	Bang Sook-hee	MBC
2008	Aster	Jung Soo-hee	MBC
2008	White Lie	Joo Ae-sook	MBC
2009	Queen of Housewives	Chun Ji-ae's mother	MBC
2009	Two Wives	Oh Dal-ja	SBS
2010	Pink Lipstick	Jung Hae-shil	MBC
2010	Three Sisters	Madam Tu	SBS
2010	Life Is Beautiful	Kyung-soo's mother	SBS
2011	Drama Special Series: "Hair Show"	Jin Kang-hye	KBS2
2011	Pit-a-pat, My Love	Im Jin-sook	KBS2
2012	My Husband Got a Family	Han Man-hee	KBS2
2012	Ice Adonis	Han Kyung-sook	tvN
2012	The Sons	Mrs. Jung	MBC
2012	It Was Love	Kim Myung-ja	MBC
2013	Crazy Love	Go Yoo-jung	tvN
2013	Princess Aurora	Lee Anna	MBC
2013	Who Are You?	Park Eung-joon's mother (guest, episodes 3-4)	tvN
2013	Hold My Hand	Kang Ae-soon	MBC
2014	12 Years Promise	Yeo Sam-sook	jTBC
2014	Apgujeong Midnight Sun	Oh Dal-ran	MBC
2016	The Love Is Coming	Yang Bok-soon	SBS

=== Film ===
Year	Title	Role
1974	Bridge of Death	
1976	I Want to Give You	
1977	A Young Man Aware of Gwanghamun Well	
1977	The Virgin's Castle	
1978	Woman Walking on Asphalt	Nam-soon
1978	Two Minus Three	
1979	Muldori Village	
1979	The Rain at Night	Ga-hee
1979	A Single Woman	
1980	The Man to Be Forgotten	
1980	Male Housekeeper	
1980	Love Me Once Again Despite Hatred '80	
1980	Two Women	
1981	Goodbye Daddy '81	
1985	The Singing Tramp of Last Year	
1991	Cafe Girl	
1993	To the Starry Island	
2013	Norigae	Go Da-ryung's mother

=== Variety show ===
Year	Title
1981	Kim Young-ran's Dish of the Day
1999	Kim Young-ran's Affordable Money Tech

== Writings ==
Year	Title	Publisher
1997	Kim Young-ran's Money Tech Lecture Series	The Dong-A Ilbo
1998	Kim Young-ran's Housewife Economics	Golden Bough Books

== Awards and nominations ==
Year	Award	Category	Nominated work	Result
1977	Hyundai Society of Film Critics Awards	Best New Actress	The Virgin's Castle	Won
1977	16th Grand Bell Awards	Best New Actress	The Virgin's Castle	Won
1979	25th Asia-Pacific Film Festival	Best Actress	Muldori Village	Won
1980	MBC Drama Awards	Top Excellence Award, Actress		Won
1981	17th Baeksang Arts Awards	Best Actress (TV)	Mischievous Milady	Won
1981	MBC Drama Awards	Top Excellence Award, Actress	Mischievous Milady	Won
