= Crazy Love (2013 TV series) =

2013 South Korean television series

- Promotional poster
- Genre: Melodrama; Romance
- Written by: Jang Soo-won; Jeon Bo-kyung
- Directed by: Lee Chang-han
- Starring: Park Sun-young; Go Se-won; Heo Tae-hee; Kim Yeon-joo; Kim Hae-in; Choi Dae-hoon
- Composer: Kim Tae-wan
- Country of origin: South Korea
- Original language: Korean
- No. of episodes: 100

Production
- Executive producers: Lee Chan-ho; Lee Jin-seok
- Producers: Lee Min-jin; Jo Na-hyun
- Production company: JS Pictures

Original release
- Network: tvN
- Release: April 8 – September 17, 2013

Crazy Love (Korean: 미친사랑; RR: Michinsarang) is a 2013 South Korean melodrama television series starring Park Sun-young, Go Se-won, Heo Tae-hee, Kim Yeon-joo, Kim Hae-in and Choi Dae-hoon. It aired on tvN from April 8 to September 17, 2013 on Mondays to Fridays at 21:45 (KST) for 100 episodes.

Due to the drama's popularity, beginning July 22, 2013, its format was expanded from Mondays to Thursdays (four episodes a week), to Mondays to Fridays (five episodes a week).

== Synopsis ==
Orphan Yoon Mi-so falls in love with Lee Min-jae, a rich heir. But what appeared to be a storybook ending with her prince turns into tragedy when Min-jae divorces her. Cast away like a used toy, Mi-so hits her all-time low. But after a life of abandonment and betrayal, she finds love again.

== Cast ==
Main

- Park Sun-young as Yoon Mi-so / Hong Eun-joo
- Go Se-won as Seo Kyung-soo
- Heo Tae-hee as Lee Min-jae
- Kim Yeon-joo as Han Na-young / Lee Sun-hee
- Kim Hae-in as Oh Hae-ryung
- Choi Dae-hoon as Baek Jae-hyuk

Supporting

- Yoo Hye-ri as Heo Myung-ja
- Lee Hee-do as Oh Tae-san
- Kim Young-ran as Go Yoo-jung
- Lee Chae-mi as Lee Hae-ram, Mi-so's daughter
- Jang Yoon-seo as Kim Jong-hee
- Kang Seo-joon as Yoon Chan-ki
- Maeng Sang-hoon as Yoon Moon-do
- Kim Bun-young as Yoon Ji-mi
- Oh Mi-hee as Jo Na-hyun
- Choi Joon-young as Seo Kyung-min
- Choi Min as Robert Jung
- Min Joon-hyun

== Soundtrack ==
The soundtrack features four tracks, namely "Bitter Love", "Send", "Unemptying Love", and "I Only Love You".
