= Park Ha-sun =

South Korean actress (born 1987)

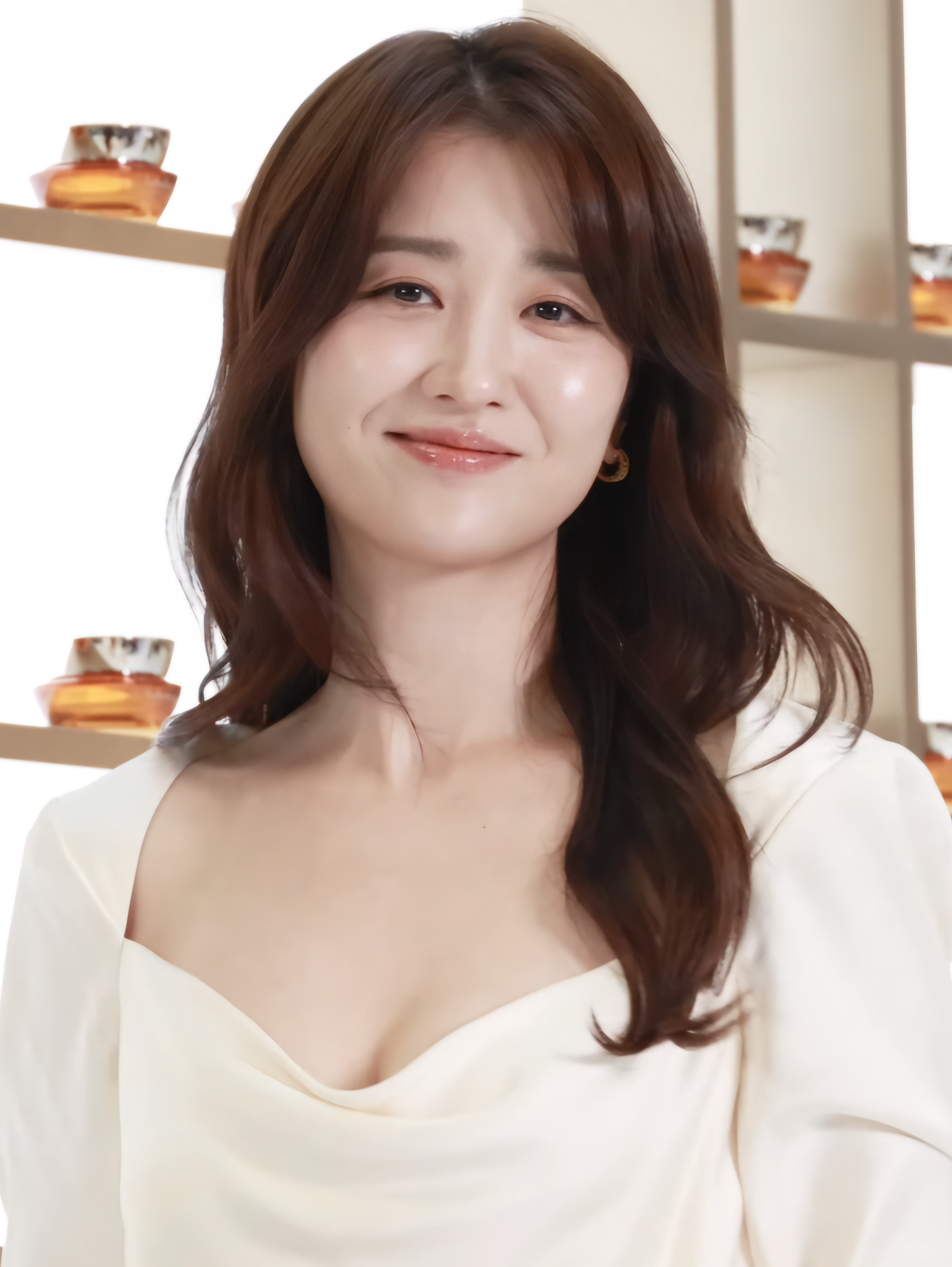
- Park in August 2024
- Born: October 22, 1987 (age 39); Seoul, South Korea
- Education: Dongguk University (Theater and Film)
- Occupation: Actress
- Years active: 2005–present
- Agent: Blitzway Entertainment
- Spouse: Ryu Soo-young (m. 2017)
- Children: 1

Korean name
- Hangul: 박하선
- Hanja: 朴河宣
- RR: Bak Haseon
- MR: Pak Hasŏn

Park Ha-sun (Korean: 박하선; born October 22, 1987) is a South Korean actress and entertainer. She made her debut in 2005 with the TV series Love Needs a Miracle. Park rose to fame for her portrayal of Queen Inhyeon in MBC's 2010 historical drama Dong Yi, and as a teacher in the sitcom High Kick: Revenge of the Short Legged that aired in 2011–2012.

Throughout her career, Park has appeared in various films, including The Last Blossom (2011), Champ (2011), Tone-deaf Clinic (2012), and Midnight Runners (2017). She has also starred in dramas like Two Weeks, Three Days, Drinking Solo, Birthcare Center, and The Veil. Since 2020, Park has been working as a radio jockey for Park Ha-sun Cinetown.

== Early life and education ==
Park was born October 22, 1987 in Seoul, South Korea. She went on to major in theater and film studies and graduated from Dongguk University. She was also chosen as an ambassador for the university in 2014, alongside Apink's Naeun and actress Im Yoon-ah.

== Career ==
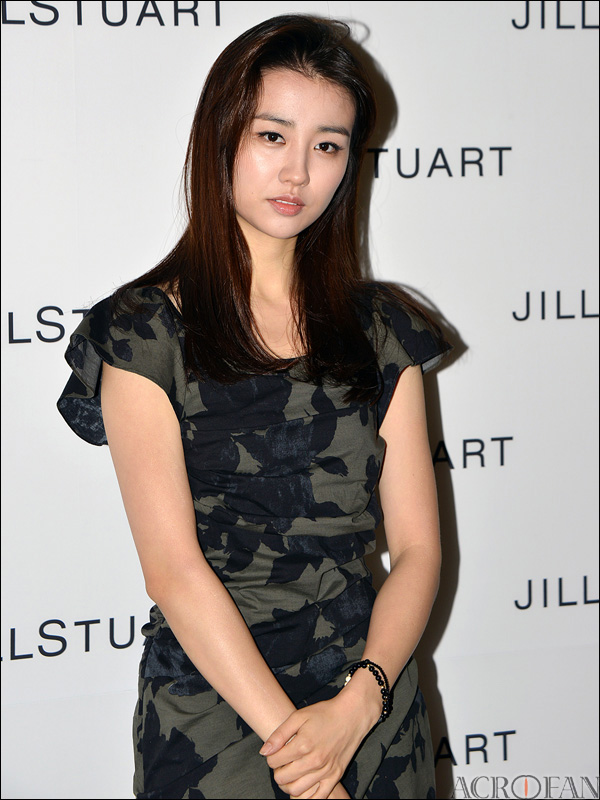
Park in September 2012

Park debuted in 2005 with the TV series Love Needs a Miracle and rose to stardom with her role as Queen Inhyeon in MBC's 2010 historical drama Dong Yi, followed by a comedic turn as a teacher in the popular sitcom High Kick: Revenge of the Short Legged that aired in 2011–2012. Her visual and stylish outfits received praise, leading to her becoming a popular actress by the first half of 2012. She won the Best TV Entertainment Award at the 48th Baeksang Arts Awards. Park also has appeared in films such as The Last Blossom (2011), Champ (2011), and Tone-deaf Clinic (2012).

In 2013, she returned to dramas with Ad Genius Lee Tae-baek on KBS and showcased her acting skills in the MBC drama Two Weeks. She also made a cameo in episode 30 of Potato Star 2013QR3. In 2014, she appeared in SBS dramas SBS dramas Three Days and Temptation. In January 2015, she participated in the Real Men: Female Soldier Special - Season 2. In September 2016, she portrayed Park Ha-na in the tvN drama Drinking Solo.

After getting married and having a child, she took a break from acting. During this time, the film Midnight Runners, in which she played Lee Joo-hee, was released on August 9, 2017. She won the Best Supporting Actress award the following year at the Golden Cinema Film Festival.

In March 2019, Park signed with new agency KeyEast. In July 2019, Park returned to acting as the lead role of Son Ji-eun in the Channel A drama Love Affairs in the Afternoon. Despite some initial concerns about the material, her acting contributed to the highest viewership ratings in Channel A drama history. She expressed her deep affection for the project, considering it a significant achievement in her career. In December 2019, she was cast as the main character in the film First Child.

On June 29, 2020, Park Ha-sun appeared on KBS 9 o'clock News Anchor Invitation Seat. In November 2020, she starred in the tvN drama Birthcare Center as Cho Eun-jeong, a seemingly perfect mother who breastfeeds twins for 24 months. Despite her image as a flawless parent, her life is far from perfect. Her portrayal earned her a nomination for Best Supporting Actress at the 57th Baeksang Arts Awards.

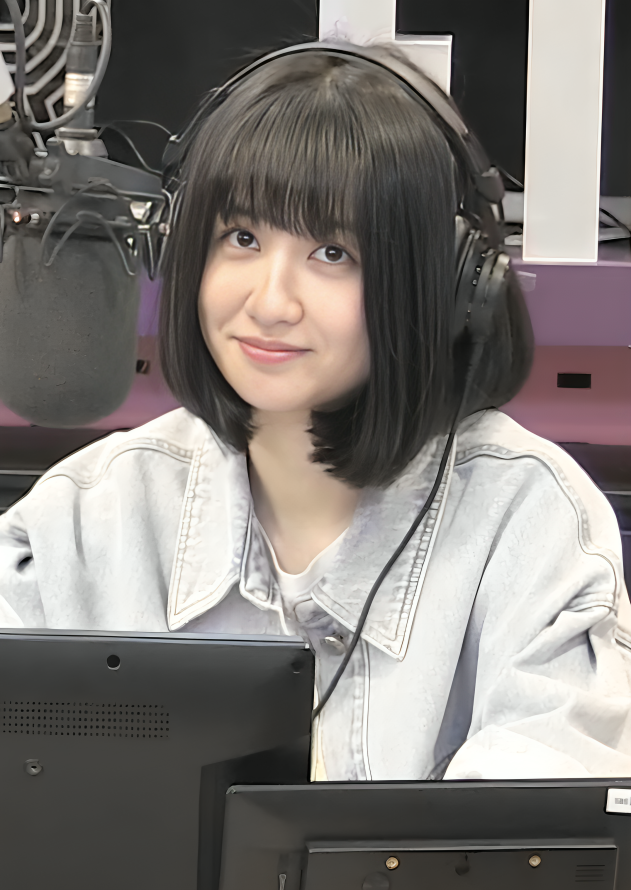
Park in April 2021

In September 2021, she starred in the MBC drama The Veil as Seo Soo-yeon, Ji-hyuk's colleague at the NIS and the head of the Criminal Information Integration Center. She was nominated for the Top Excellence Award for Actress in a Miniseries at the MBC Drama Awards. She later appeared in the spin-off titled Moebius: The Veil, which received positive reviews for its excellent direction and strong acting. Many viewers believed that including "Moebius" in the original series would have provided a more comprehensive understanding of the characters' past and backgrounds.

In March 2022, Park renewed her contract for the second time. In late February 2024, Park decided not to renew with KeyEast. She then signed an exclusive contract with Blitzway Entertainment.

== Personal life ==
=== Marriage and family ===
Park married actor Ryu Soo-young in a private ceremony at the Mayfield Hotel in Seoul on January 22, 2017. Their romantic relationship started in 2014. They also worked together in the television drama Two Weeks (2013).

They welcomed their first child, a daughter, on August 2, 2017.

=== Philanthropy ===
On March 15, 2022, Park made a donation ₩100 million to the Hope Bridge Disaster Relief Association along with Ryu Soo-young to help those who have been damaged by the massive wildfire that started in Uljin, North Gyeongsang Province and Samcheok, Gangwon Province.

On March 16, 2022, Park donated ₩10 million won for emergency relief in Ukraine to Korea's first international relief and development NGO Hope Friend Measures for Hunger.

On May 28, 2022, Park donated ₩10 million to the Heart Heart Orchestra, which comprises developmental disabilities.

On November 6, 2022, Park donated clothes and diapers to an orphanage, by posting via SNS.

== Filmography ==
=== Film ===
Year	Title	Role	Notes	Ref.
2006	Apt.	Jung-hong		
2007	Mom Never Dies	Ji-hye		
2008	Miracle of a Giving Fool	Ji-in		
2010	Jumunjin	So-hee		
2010	I Came from Busan	In-hwa		
2011	The Last Blossom	Jung Yeon-soo		
2011	Champ	Yoon-hee		
2012	Tone-deaf Clinic	Dong-joo		
2017	Midnight Runners	Joo-hee		
2017	Roman Holiday	Kang Sun-young		
2021	Confession	Park Oh-soon		
2022	First Child	Jung-ah		
2022	Ditto	Professor of sociology	Special appearance	
2023	Where Would You Like to Go?	Myeong-ji		

=== Television series ===
Year	Title	Role	Notes	Ref.
2005	Love Needs a Miracle	Song Yoon-ju		
2006	Just Run!	Min-jeong		
2007	Capital Scandal	So Yeong-rang		
2007	The King and I	Princess Consort Munseong of the Shin clan		
2008	Formidable Rivals	Seo Eun-young		
2008	Hometown Legends: "Curse of the Sajin Sword"	Hyang-yi		
2009	Romance Zero	Nam Hyeon-jeong		
2009	The Accidental Couple	Choi Soo-yeon		
2009	Can't Stop Now	Lee Joo-ah		
2010	Dong Yi	Queen Inhyeon		
2010		Documentary narrator		
2011	High Kick: Revenge of the Short Legged	Park Ha-sun		
2013	Ad Genius Lee Tae-baek	Baek Ji-yoon		
2013	Two Weeks	Seo In-hye		
2013	Potato Star 2013QR3	president of Jang Yul's fan club	Cameo appearance (Episode 30)	
2013	Drama Festival: "Lee Sang That Lee Sang"	Kyung-hye		
2014	Three Days	Yoon Bo-won		
2014	Temptation	Na Hong-joo		
2016	Drinking Solo	Park Ha-na		
2019	Love Affairs in the Afternoon	Son Ji-eun		
2020	Birthcare Center	Cho Eun-jeong		
2021	Drama Stage: "On the Way to the Gynecologist"	Yoo Hwa-yeong	Season 4; one act-drama	
2021	Monthly Magazine Home	Newlyweds	Cameo appearance	
2021	The Veil	Seo Soo-yeon		
2023	KBS Drama Special: "The True Love of Madam"	Choi Seol-ae	one act-drama	

=== Web series ===
Year	Title	Role	Notes	Ref.
2020–2022	No, Thank You	Min Sa-rin	Season 1–2	
2024	Tarot	Young-ji's mother		

=== Television show ===
Year	Title	Role	Notes	Ref.
2015	Real Men: Female Soldier Special - Season 2	Cast member		
2021	Bride X Club	Club leader		
2022	Special Live Broadcast to Help Damage from Wildfires	Host	Special live broadcast to help forest fire victims	
2022	As You Want	Tour guide		
2023	Myeongdong Love Room	Manager		
2023	Listen, See, It's Okay	Cast Member	Television, drama, sound	

=== Web shows ===
Year	Title	Role	Notes	Ref.
2022	Saturday Night Live Korea	Host	Episode 13 – Season 2	

=== Radio ===
Year	Title	Role	Ref.
2020–present	Park Ha-sun's Cinetown	DJ	

=== Hosting ===
Year	Title	Role	Notes	Ref.
2021	22nd Jeonju International Fantastic Film Festival	Host	with Kwon Hae-hyo	

=== Music video appearance ===
Year	Title		Artist	Ref.
Year	English	Hangul	Artist	Ref.
2015	"Growing"	꽃이 핀다	K.Will	

== Theater ==
Theater play performances of Park Ha-sun
Year	Title		Role	Venue	Date	Ref.
Year	English	Korean	Role	Venue	Date	Ref.
2010	A Nap	낮잠	Yi-sun			
2023	Our Little Sister	바닷마을 다이어리	Sachi	Seoul Arts Center	October 8 to November 19	

== Discography ==
Year	Track	Artist	Album
2009	남자...버림받다	Cerulean Blue (feat. narration by Park Ha-sun)	남자...버림받다
2012		Park Ha-sun	박하선의 야옹쌤 - 하이킥 고양이 울음소리

== Accolades ==
=== Awards and nominations ===
Name of the award ceremony, year presented, category, nominee of the award, and the result of the nomination
Award ceremony	Year	Category	Nominee / Work	Result	Ref.
APAN Star Awards	2025	Excellence Award, Actress in a Short Drama or Web Drama	A Love That's Completely Useless, Psychopath Yeo Soon-jeong	Won	
Baeksang Arts Awards	2011	Best New Actress – Television	Dong Yi	Nominated	
Baeksang Arts Awards	2012	Best Variety Performer - Female	High Kick: Revenge of the Short Legged	Won	
Baeksang Arts Awards	2021	Best Supporting Actress – Television	Birthcare Center	Nominated	
Golden Cinema Film Festival	2018	Best Supporting Actress	Midnight Runners	Won	
MBC Drama Awards	2010	Best New Actress	Dong Yi	Won	
MBC Drama Awards	2013	Excellence Award, Actress in a Miniseries	Two Weeks	Nominated	
MBC Drama Awards	2021	Top Excellence Award, Actress in a Miniseries	The Veil	Nominated	
MBC Entertainment Awards	2011	Excellence Award, Actress in a Sitcom/Comedy	High Kick: Revenge of the Short Legged	Won	
SBS Drama Awards	2014	Top Excellence Award, Actress in a Miniseries	Three Days	Nominated	
SBS Entertainment Awards	2021	Rookie Radio DJ Award	Park Ha-sun's Cine Town	Won	
Seoul International Drama Awards	2021	Best Actress	No, Thank You	Nominated	

=== State honors ===
Name of country, year given, and name of honor
Country Or Organization	Year	Honor Or Award	Ref.
Ministry of Gender Equality and Family	2011	Minister's Award	
