= Yoon Sang-hyun =

South Korean actor and singer (born 1973)

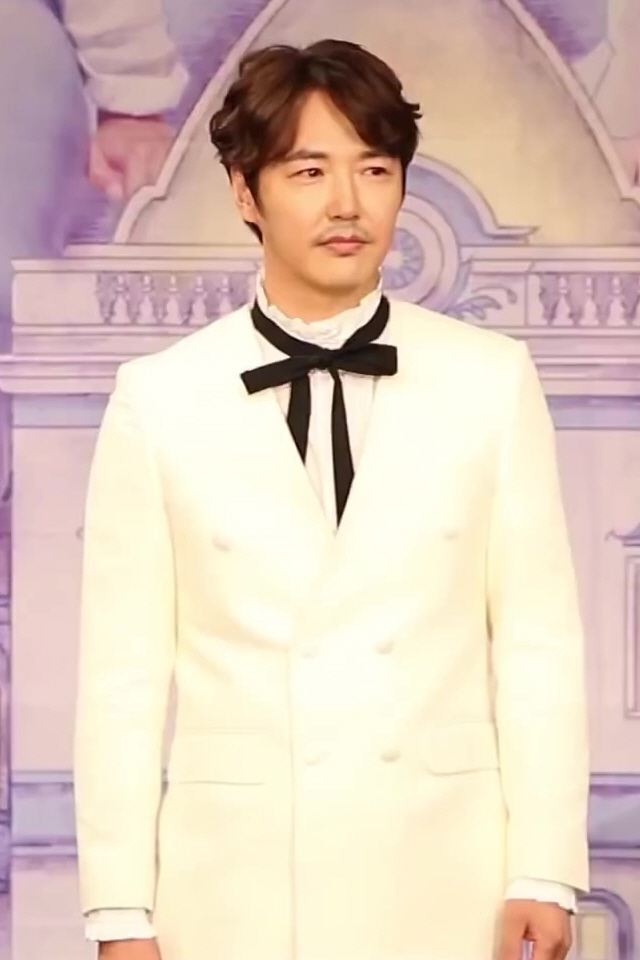
- Yoon in 2016
- Born: September 21, 1973 (age 53); Paju, South Korea
- Occupations: Actor; singer
- Years active: 2000–present
- Agent: Luke Media
- Spouse: MayBee (m. 2015)
- Children: Yoon Na-gyeom; Yoon Na-on; Yoon Hee-seong

Korean name
- Hangul: 윤상현
- Hanja: 尹相鉉
- RR: Yun Sanghyeon
- MR: Yun Sanghyŏn

Yoon Sang-hyun (Korean: 윤상현; born September 21, 1973) is a South Korean actor and singer. He is best known for his roles in Queen of Housewives (2009), My Fair Lady (2009), Secret Garden (2011) and I Can Hear Your Voice (2013).

== Career ==
Yoon Sang-hyun made his show business debut relatively late at age 32, in the 2005 television series Marrying a Millionaire. This was followed by forgettable supporting roles, until his breakout as the immature chaebol Tae-bong in Queen of Housewives in 2009. Later that year, he was cast in his first lead role as a rich woman's butler in My Fair Lady.

In early 2010, Yoon released the Japanese single Saigo no Ame ("The Last Rain"), which debuted at 11th place on the Oricon Chart. He released his second single Oath on June 24.

This was followed by hit TV series Secret Garden with Kim Sa-rang, in which he played the protagonist's cousin and Hallyu star Oska. He released a single titled "Looking at U" for the soundtrack of the drama.

In 2011, he released his Japanese debut studio album Precious Days, followed by concerts and showcases in Tokyo (February 25, 2011) and Osaka (February 27, 2011), which sold out after only one day. He then starred in romantic comedy Can't Lose, about a lawyer couple facing their own divorce suit.

Yoon appeared in his first major film role in 2012's Tone-deaf Clinic (released internationally as Love Clinique), playing a vocal coach who gives a tone-deaf woman voice lessons so that she can sing well in front of her crush.

In 2013, he returned to the small screen with the popular series I Can Hear Your Voice, playing a well-meaning but bumbling cop-turned-public defender. He later reunited with the director of I Can Hear Your Voice in the 2014 cable drama Gap-dong, in which he played a detective out to capture a serial killer and clear his father's name. He then starred in the comedy film, My Dynamite Family.

In 2016, Yoon starred in the romantic comedy drama My Horrible Boss. He starred in another rom-com the same year, playing the second lead role in Shopaholic Louis.

In 2017, Yoon starred in the mystery black-comedy drama, Ms. Perfect.

In 2018, Yoon starred in the melodrama Let's Look at the Sunset Holding Hands alongside Han Hye-jin.

In 2020 he appeared in 18 Again a television series based on the 2009 film 17 Again opposite Kim Ha-neul.

== Personal life ==
Yoon married singer MayBee (Kim Eun-ji) on February 8, 2015, at the Walkerhill Hotel in Seoul. A day later, they released the duet Balsam Colors to commemorate the occasion, with sales from the digital single going to charity. The couple became engaged in November 2014 after eight months of dating. The couple's first daughter Na-gyeom was born in December 2015, while their second daughter was born in May 2017.

== Filmography ==
=== Film ===
Year	Title	Role	Notes	Ref.
2006	Ssunday Seoul	man on date	Bit part	
2012	Tone-deaf Clinic	Shin-heung		
2014	A Dynamite Family	Soo-kyo		
2019	Miss & Mrs. Cops	Ji-chul		

=== Television series ===
Year	Title	Role	Notes	Ref.
2005	Marrying a Millionaire	Yoo Jin-ha		
2006	Fireworks	Kang Seung-woo		
2006	Common Single	Yoon Ji-heon		
2007	Winter Bird	Joo Kyung-woo		
2008	The Secret of Coocoo Island	Chairman Yoon		
2008	One Mom and Three Dads	Jung Sung-min		
2009	Queen of Housewives	Heo Tae-joon / "Tae-bong"		
2009	My Fair Lady	Seo Dong-chan		
2010	Secret Garden	Oska		
2011	Can't Lose	Yeon Hyung-woo		
2013	I Can Hear Your Voice	Cha Gwan-woo		
2014	Gap-dong	Ha Moo-yeom		
2014	Pinocchio	Cha Gwan-woo	Cameo, episode 12	
2015	The Time We Were Not in Love	Himself	Cameo, episode 2	
2016	My Horrible Boss	Nam Jung-gi		
2016	Shopping King Louie	Cha Joong-won		
2017	Ms. Perfect	Koo Jung-hee		
2017	Strong Girl Bong-soon	Charles Go	Cameo, episode 8	
2018	Hold Me Tight	Kim Do-young		
2018	My Secret Terrius	Yoo Ji-sub		
2020	18 Again	Hong Dae-young		
2024	Perfect Family	Choi Hyun-min		
2024	Namib	Shim Jun-seok		

=== Television show ===
Year	Title	Role	Ref.
2010	Family Outing 2	Cast member	
2015	Law of the Jungle in Yap Islands	Cast member	
2015	The Human Condition Season 2	Cast member	
2019	Same Bed, Different Dreams 2: You Are My Destiny	Cast member	

== Discography ==
=== Studio albums ===
Title	Album details	Peak chart positions	
Title	Album details	JPN	KOR
Precious Days (プレシャス・デイズ)	Released: February 16, 2011; Label: Sony Music	39	49

=== Singles ===
Title	Year	Peak chart positions	Album
Title	Year	JPN	Album
Korean
"I Love You" (사랑해요 (그대 Song))	2009	—	Non-album singles
"The Story of You and the Rain" (비와 당신의 이야기)	2009	—	Non-album singles
"Balsam Red" (봉숭아 물들다) (with MayBee)	2015	—	Non-album singles
"You Within Me" (내 안의 그대)	2016	—	Non-album singles
Japanese
"Saigo No Ame" (最後の雨)	2010	18	Precious Days
"Chikai" (誓い)	2010	32	Precious Days
"Summer Eyes"	2011	26	Non-album singles
"Farewell to Sorrow" (悲しみにさよなら)	2012	22	Non-album singles
"—" denotes releases that did not chart or were not released in that region.

=== Soundtrack appearances ===
Title	Year	Peak chart positions	Album
Title	Year	KOR	Album
"Never Ending Story"	2009	—	Queen of Housewives OST
"Helpless Love" (사랑은 어쩔 수 없네요)	2009	—	My Fair Lady OST
"I See You Leave" (바라본다)	2010	68	Secret Garden OST
"Here I Am"	2011	28	Secret Garden OST
"Do You Know I Am Used to This Feeling" (정든거 아시나요)	2011	96	Can't Lose OST
"Run & Run"	2012	—	Vocal Clinic OST
"If We Love Again" (다시 사랑한다면)	2020	—	18 Again OST
"—" denotes releases that did not chart or were not released in that region.

== Commercials ==
Year	Product	Notes
2005	Tudou	
2009	Pizza	
2009	RGII Somang	
2009	O Hui Cosmetics	with Ku Hye-sun
2009	Korean Wells	
2009	Maxim	
2009	Raycop	
2010	Digital Cable TV	with Kang Ho-dong
2011	Zoo Coffee	
2011	Sonsoo	with Song Joong-ki and Song Seung-heon
2011	Hi Mart mobile	
2011	Hi Mart Refrigerator TV	with T-ara
2011	Hi Mart Laptop	with T-ara
2011	Frion Fall Collection	
2013–2014	GSGM Chasecult	
2013	Citizens Participation in Criminal Trials	
2013	Shin Ramyun Black	with Jang Hyuk
2014	Busan Milk	

== Accolades ==
=== Awards and nominations ===
Year	Award	Category	Nominated work	Result
2006	SBS Drama Awards	New Star Award	Common Single	Won
2008	2nd Korea Drama Awards	Netizen Popularity Award	Winter Bird, The Secret of Coocoo Island	Nominated
2008	MBC Drama Awards	Best New Actor	The Secret of Coocoo Island	Nominated
2009	KBS Drama Awards	Excellence Award, Actor in a Miniseries	My Fair Lady	Nominated
2009	KBS Drama Awards	Popularity Award, Actor	My Fair Lady	Won
2009	KBS Drama Awards	Best Couple Award with Yoon Eun-hye	My Fair Lady	Won
2009	MBC Drama Awards	Top Excellence Award, Actor	Queen of Housewives	Won
2009	MBC Drama Awards	Popularity Award, Actor	Queen of Housewives	Nominated
2009	MBC Drama Awards	Best Couple Award with Sunwoo Sun	Queen of Housewives	Nominated
2009	17th Korean Culture and Entertainment Awards	Excellence Award, actor	Queen of Housewives	Won
2010	46th Baeksang Arts Awards	Best Actor (TV)	Queen of Housewives	Nominated
2011	MBC Drama Awards	Best Couple Award with Choi Ji-woo	Can't Lose	Nominated
2013	SBS Drama Awards	Excellence Award, Actor in a Miniseries	I Can Hear Your Voice	Nominated
2017	KBS Drama Awards	Excellence Award, Actor in a Mid-length Drama	Ms. Perfect	Nominated
2018	MBC Drama Awards	Top Excellence Award, Actor in a Wednesday-Thursday Miniseries	Hold Me Tight	Nominated
2019	13th SBS Entertainment Awards	Excellence Award in Reality Category	Same Bed, Different Dreams 2: You Are My Destiny	Won

=== Listicles ===
Name of publisher, year listed, name of listicle, and placement
Publisher	Year	Listicle	Placement	Ref.
Forbes	2010	Korea Power Celebrity 40	40th	
