= 18 Again =

2020 South Korean television series

- Promotional poster
- Hangul: 18 어게인
- RR: 18 eogein
- MR: 18 ŏgein
- Genre: Romance; Comedy; Fantasy drama; Coming-of-age
- Based on: 17 Again by Jason Filardi
- Written by: Ahn Eun-bin; Choi Yi-ryool; Kim Do-yeon
- Directed by: Ha Byung-hoon
- Starring: Kim Ha-neul; Yoon Sang-hyun; Lee Do-hyun
- Theme music composer: Various artists (Note: See 18 Again: OST Special Album CD 1 for the names of all involved theme music composers.)
- Composer: Various artists (Note: See 18 Again: OST Special Album CD 2 for the names of all involved musical score composers.)
- Country of origin: South Korea
- Original language: Korean
- No. of episodes: 16

Production
- Executive producer: Im Byung-hoon
- Producers: Kim Ji-won; Park Woo-ram
- Cinematography: Jo Young-jik; Byun Ji-soo
- Editor: Ha Byung-hoon
- Running time: 67–75 minutes
- Production company: JTBC Studios

Original release
- Network: JTBC
- Release: September 21 – November 10, 2020

18 Again (Korean: 18 어게인; RR: 18 eogein) is a 2020 South Korean television series based on the 2009 film 17 Again by Jason Filardi, likely inspired by the 1988 comedy movie of the (series') same name featuring George Burns. Starring Kim Ha-neul, Yoon Sang-hyun, and Lee Do-hyun. It aired on JTBC from September 21 to November 10, 2020, every Monday and Tuesday at 21:35 (KST). The series is available on iQIYI and Viu with multi-language subtitles.

== Synopsis ==
Jung Da-jung (Kim Ha-neul) and Hong Dae-young (Yoon Sang-hyun) are married and have a set of fraternal twins, Hong Shi-ah (Roh Jeong-eui) and Hong Shi-woo (Ryeoun). At first, they have a perfectly happy marriage despite having children at a very young age and having financial problems. Years later, their happy marriage starts crumbling when 37-year-old Da-jung files for divorce and their 18-year-old good looking twins start ignoring Dae-young, except for pocket money. Furthermore, Dae-young's life turns more miserable when he loses his job, after his boss promotes his nephew who has worked in the company for only 4 years, while relocating Dae-young to Busan.

Wishing he could go back in time and fix his life, Dae-young's 37-year-old body miraculously morphs into the body he had when he was 18 years old (Lee Do-hyun) but retains his 37-year-old mentality. He starts living a new life under his alias "Go Woo-young" and attends Serim High School, which is his twins' school, and also the school he and Da-jung attended 18 years ago. During Dae-young's life as the 18-year-old Go Woo-young, he learns that his daughter Shi-ah is working part-time in a convenience store without his permission and his son Shi-woo is being bullied at school by the basketball captain, Goo Ja-sung (Hwang In-youp). Dae-young also learns about his son's interest and talent in basketball that Shi-woo always hides from him. Dae-young eventually realizes the true reason behind his family's crumbling bond and gets to know more about his twins. He resolves to use this chance to protect his kids by befriending them and doing his best to be more present to the family despite his appearance as an 18-year-old boy.

== Cast ==
=== Main ===
- Kim Ha-neul as Jung Da-jung (She is the drama counterpart of 37-year-old Scarlett O'Donnell (Leslie Mann) in the original film.)
  - Han So-eun as 18-year-old Da-jung (She is the drama counterpart of 17-year-old Scarlett O'Donnell (Allison Miller) in the original film.)

Hong Dae-young's wife, 37-year-old mother of twins Shi-ah and Shi-woo, and a JBC intern announcer. Da-jung was very popular among Serim High School boys (she is every male students' first love) and eventually dated her classmate and popular basketball player Hong Dae-young. But before they can complete high school, they had to get married as she got pregnant with Hong Dae-young's twins, delaying her dream job of being a news announcer and postponing her college education. In present time, she is a 37-year-old mother to a pair of teenage twins who is getting fatigued of her husband's behavior. She files for a divorce alongside her job application at JBC to fulfill her dream despite being a mother in her late 30s. She is talented in martial arts, which she demonstrated since she was 18 years old. She gradually became troubled by her attraction towards her twins' 18-year-old friend "Go Woo-young", without knowing that Woo-young was actually her husband whose body reverted to his 18-year-old self. She later found out Woo-young's true identity and eventually reconciled with her husband when he once again reverted to his 37-year-old physical self in the finale of the series.

- Yoon Sang-hyun as Hong Dae-young (He is the drama counterpart of 37-year-old Mike O'Donnell, played by Matthew Perry in the original film)

Jung Da-jung's husband, 37-year-old father of twins Shi-ah and Shi-woo, and a senior washing machine repairman. Dae-young was a handsome, popular and talented basketball star in Serim High School. However, he decided not to pursue his basketball career and bravely took responsibility to marry his pregnant classmate and girlfriend Jung Da-jung and be a young father to their twins. In the first years of family life, he struggled to earn money for his family's sustenance, consequently losing his handsome, youthful looks due to combined aging, exhaustion from his multiple jobs, and unhealthy lifestyles like alcohol, smoking, and anger issues. In the present, he is a 37-year-old father to a pair of teenage twins both of whom inherit his good looks, harkening back to when he was young. His life started going downhill when Da-jung files a divorce paper against him and he gets fired from his job by his nepotistic boss.

  - Lee Do-hyun as 18-year-old Hong Dae-young turned Go Woo-young (He is the drama counterpart of 37-year-old Mike O'Donnell turned Mark Gold (Zac Efron) in the original film.)

Wishing he could go back in time and fix his life, Hong Dae-young's 37-year-old body miraculously morphs into his 18-year-old body but retains his 37-year-old mindset and mannerisms. Dae-young starts living a new life as his best friend Go Deok-jin's son "Go Woo-young" (he pretended to be a homeschooled teenage son of Deok-jin who lived in United States with his non-existent mother) and attends Serim High School, his twins' school, as a Class 2-7 student. At first, he wants to fulfill his dream of being basketball star and accepted into college through a basketball scholarship. However, by attending their school, he gets to know things about his twins that he never knew before and, later, the true reason behind the crumbling bond between him and the family. He resolves to use this chance to protect his kids by befriending them and to do his best to be more present to the family despite his appearance as an 18-year-old boy. (Note: Dae-young's original self (Yoon Sang-hyun) sometimes appear on-screen for the viewers to understand his inner feelings.) Later, Woo-young was offered a chance to receive a basketball scholarship and get admitted into Hankook University, but Woo-young ultimately decided to give up this chance as he chose his family as the more important thing to him (after realising it), and he thus transformed back to his 37-year-old self after leaving the school (under the pretext of returning to the USA) and confessing his true feelings to Da-jung, who earlier tried to convince him to accept this chance out of guilt for making him giving up his dream for her 19 years ago.

=== Supporting ===
==== Dae-young and Da-jung's family ====
- Roh Jeong-eui as Hong Shi-ah (Note: She is the drama's counterpart of Maggie O'Donnell (Michelle Trachtenberg) from the original film.)

The older twin daughter of Hong Dae-young and Jung Da-jung; a student of Class 2-7 in Serim High School. A pretty and popular girl at school but with a strong and rebellious personality, she frequently schemes Dae-young for her pocket money. In order to pursue her dream of being a makeup artist, she also works part-time in a convenience store without her parents' permission while only her friends and twin know about this, only to be caught by her father who runs into her while being in his 18-year-old body. Because of the incident in the convenience store, she was hostile towards him, especially when she finds that he (posing as Go Woo-young) is placed in her class. The bad blood between them was aggravated by Woo-young scolding her for her misbehaviour towards her father when she unknowingly confessed these mischievous acts to her friends in Woo-young's presence (without knowing that Woo-young was her father in disguise). However, as the series progressed, she was gradually touched by Woo-young's caring attitude and kindness towards her and start to befriend him, though she later confused Woo-young's kindness as romantic moves (without knowing he is her father). Despite her rebellious nature, she deeply loves and cares about her family, even blaming herself for her parents' crumbling relationship. Because of her late night part-time job, she always comes late to school, and is frequently being seen picking up trash or running in the school field as punishment. Even though she attracted both Seo Ji-ho (her childhood friend) and Goo Ja-sung (the high school basketball captain), however, she ends up with Ji-ho, as unlike her twin, she was generally less forgiving of Ja-sung and rejected his feelings for Ji-ho's due to her still remembering what Ja-sung did to Shi-woo in the past. Her hostility towards Ja-sung remains (though lesser compared to the past) even after he had sincerely sought and received forgiveness for his actions.

- Ryeoun as Hong Shi-woo (Note: He is the drama's counterpart of Alex O'Donnell (Sterling Knight) from the original film.)

The younger twin son of Hong Dae-young and Jung Da-jung; a student of Serim High School. Unlike his twin sister and despite his handsome look, Shi-woo is a school outcast and frequently being bullied by Goo Ja-sung and the basketball team. He is very talented in playing basketball and loves playing it just like Dae-young but he hides this fact from him because he feels inferior with his father's basketball talent. Because of being bullied and his family life, he initially shows a very cold personality and appears mostly in a gloomy mood. He meets his turned-18-year-old father (posing as Go Woo-young) at school when the latter saves him from being bullied by Ja-sung. He becomes best friends with Woo-young, who protects him from the bullies, plays basketball with him and encourages him to push forward with his basketball career. Through Woo-young, Shi-woo is able to elevate his crumbled self-esteem after being bullied and regains his smile. He also forgives Ja-sung after he apologises to him for bullying him and becomes friends with him and later the other basketball players. He is later accepted into the Hankook University through basketball scholarship, and grows into a popular basketball player with a bright career awaiting him, just like what his father wants when he was younger.

- Kim Mi-kyung as Yeo In-ja

Jung Da-jung's mother. In-ja was very upset with the fact that her daughter was pregnant when she was at school. At first, she wanted Da-jung to abort her twins, but later decided to support her decision in keeping the twins and treating Hong Dae-young like her son. However, she is very upset with Dae-young and Da-jung's decision to divorce without consulting with her. To comfort Da-jung and the twins after her divorce, she lived in Da-jung's house with her grandson and granddaughter for some time.

- Lee Byung-joon as Hong Joo-man

Hong Dae-young's father who is supportive to Dae-young's basketball career. Eighteen years ago, Joo-man, together with his wife, had kept his wife's failing health a secret from Dae-young in order not to distract him from achieving his basketball career; this makes Dae-young very upset later on when his mother ultimately dies. He aggravated Dae-young's resentment against him when asked Da-jung to abort the pregnancy, which then leads to Dae-young deciding to leave home and live with Da-jung. However, despite the strained relationship between him and Dae-young, he silently supports him through Da-jung by frequently sending her money to support the financially struggling teenage family. He later reconciles with 37-year-old Dae-young at the time when Dae-young's body is still in its 18-year-old form, after Dae-young, who was disguised as Go Woo-young, and emotionally revealed to his father his true self during a meeting between father and son after Woo-young and Shi-woo's basketball match.

==== People around Dae-young and Da-jung ====
- Wi Ha-joon as Ye Ji-hoon

A famous baseball athlete, the pitcher for Seum Wolves. Ji-hoon is well-known and admired by his fans (which includes Dae-young) for his perfect strike-outs. He endorses a number of commercial products, including Go Deok-jin's mobile game. He takes the parenting responsibility of his niece, Ye Seo-yeon after her father (Ji-hoon's elder brother) died due to a traffic accident and her mother abandoned the family. He harbors feelings toward Jung Da-jung because she reminds him of his late brother, but later encourages her to reconcile with her husband Dae-young after realising that Da-jung's feelings still remain towards her husband. He is grateful towards Dae-young for saving his niece from the car accident wreckage despite him failing to save his brother on time.

- Kim Kang-hyun as Go Deok-jin (Note: He is the drama's counterpart of Ned Gold (Thomas Lennon) from the original film.)

CEO of the game company Go Go Play; Hong Dae-young's rich best friend. A member of Serim High School's basketball team 18 years ago, Deok-jin became best friends with Dae-young when the latter saved him from their fellow team member Choi Il-kwon's bullying. Just like Hye-in, Deok-jin is also fond of collecting film and game merchandise, and he had built his own success as a game company CEO from his geeky hobby. In present time, he accepts Dae-young in his mansion when the latter leaves home due to his crumbling relationship with Da-jung. When Dae-young's body turns back to its 18-year-old version, he helps Dae-young assume a new identity by posing as his father, naming him "Go Woo-young" and enrolling him at Serim High School in Class 2-7. He falls in love at first sight with Class 2-7's adviser Hye-in during their first encounter at school.

- Lee Mi-do as Choo Ae-rin (Note: She is the drama's counterpart of Naomi (Nicole Sullivan) from the original film.)

A divorce lawyer; Da-jung's best friend. Eighteen years ago, Ae-rin was smitten with Hong Dae-young and attempted to bully Da-jung for being his girlfriend, unaware of Da-jung being a tough girl who can put up a fight. She became friends with her when Da-jung rescued her from being harassed by their seniors. In the present time, Ae-rin's crush on Dae-young shatters when he lost his handsome looks. She also encourages Da-jung to file the divorce against Dae-young. Her law firm's office is co-located in the same building as Deok-jin's game company office, therefore they always randomly encounter each other.

==== People from Serim High School ====
- Kim Yoo-ri as Ok Hye-in (Note: She is the drama's counterpart of Jane Masterson (Melora Hardin) except the fact that she is not the school principal.)

A music teacher and the homeroom teacher of Class 2-7 in Serim High School. Hye-in appears to be a beautiful, perfect teacher but she hides her geeky hobby from everyone, even using disguise to go to PC cafe for playing online games. Her secret room is full of film and game merchandise and a computer gaming set. She frequently interacts with a game account that is revealed to be Go Deok-jin's. She slowly develops feelings for Go Deok-jin but due to the fact that he was a father of her newly-transferred student Go Woo-young (who was actually Hong Dae-young who changed back into his teenage self), she politely rejects Deok-jin's feelings until the finale, where Woo-young, who was going to recover his 37-year-old self and wanting to leave the school, confesses to Hye-in that Deok-jin was not his true father and lies that Deok-jin was a kind-hearted stranger who in fact had adopted him when he could not find his birth parents, and encourages her to be together with Deok-jin, which finally allowed Hye-in and Deok-jin to be together.

- Lee Ki-woo as Choi Il-kwon
  - Kim Sun-min as 18-year-old Choi Il-kwon

A PE teacher and basketball coach at Serim High School. Il-kwon was Dae-young, Da-jung, Deok-jin and Ae-rin's classmate in Serim High School 18 years ago; Da-jung was also his first love. During his years in high school, he (and, accidentally, Deok-jin) saw his abusive father paying bribes to their coach in order for him to be included in the main lineup; this leads to him frequently bullying Deok-jin. He also showed a lot of jealousy and insecurity toward Hong Dae-young, in term of both basketball and Da-jung's love. He later copies his coach's crimes in present time, wherein he and his friends from the Hankook University basketball recruitment team collect bribes from the Serim basketball team's parents. He was eventually arrested and sentenced to imprisonment for bribery, along with two of the university coaches he conspired with to collect bribes from the parents. He seemed to realise Go Woo-young is actually Hong Dae-young, but he never revealed it to anyone (including Da-jung) for unknown reasons.

- Choi Bo-min as Seo Ji-ho
  - Kim Kang-hoon as child Seo Ji-ho

The class president of Class 2-7 in Serim High School. Losing his father at a young age, Ji-ho is the twins' childhood friend, being deeply loved by Dae-young who treats him as his third child. In present time, he is a model student in Serim and he harbors a crush on Hong Shi-ah, which drove him into a rivalry between himself and Ja-sung, who also apparently became attracted to Shi-ah despite having bullied her twin Shi-woo. Just like Ja-sung, he misunderstands the turned-18-year-old Dae-young's (posing as Go Woo-young) kind and caring behavior towards Hong Shi-ah as romantic moves, a misunderstanding which he held until he found out that Woo-young was actually Shi-ah's father Dae-young, making Ji-ho the only student from Serim to know about Woo-young's true identity. At the end of the series, he attends a medical school after his graduation from high school and became Shi-ah's boyfriend.

- Hwang In-youp as Goo Ja-sung (Note: He is the drama's counterpart of Stan (Hunter Parrish) from the original film.)

A student of Class 2-7 in Serim High School; the captain of Serim's basketball team. Ja-sung is known for his aggressive personality which came from his father, a rich company CEO, who abuses him and his mother, does not believe in his skill in basketball, and pays bribes to Choi Il-kwon. Ja-sung frequently abuses Hong Shi-woo, who once saw him being beaten by his father and consequently made the former very hurt to hide his humiliated side. He tried to show how strong and intimidating he is, but actually he is a weak-hearted and insecure person. He slowly harbors feelings for Hong Shi-ah and tries to win her heart even though she dislikes him because of her bullied twin and another past incident where Ja-sung insulted her mother (who just became an announcer at JBC at that time). With the help of turned-18-years-old Dae-young (posing as Go Woo-young), he drops his aggressiveness and insecurity and starts forgiving his father, apologizing and befriending Shi-woo. However, he maintain a bit of hostility towards Woo-young because he misunderstands Woo-young's kindness to Shi-ah as making romantic moves on her. He later confesses his feelings to Shi-ah (with Woo-young's help), but Shi-ah, due to her remembering Ja-sung's bullying behaviour towards Shi-woo in the past, politely declined his offer to date her and maintains a neutral relationship together with him throughout the rest of the series. Subsequently, like Shi-woo, he also furthers his basketball career in university after his high school graduation. He was also shown to become drunk easily with just one cup of beer, regardless of whether the beer contains alcohol or not.

- Oh So-hyun as Jeon Bo-bae

A student of Class 2-7 in Serim High School; one of Hong Shi-ah's friends. Bo-bae harbors a crush on Go Woo-young and confesses to him, but she stops pursuing him when she mistakenly assumes he likes Hong Shi-ah.

- Lee Eun-jae as Uhm So-mi

A student of Class 2-7 in Serim High School; one of Hong Shi-ah's friends. Without Shi-ah's knowing, So-mi has crush on her twin brother Hong Shi-woo and tries to confess to her feelings to him.

- Ryu Da-in as Hwang Young-sun

A student of Class 2-7 in Serim High School; one of Hong Shi-ah's friends.

- Bin Chan-wook as Bang Ki-yong

A student of Class 2-7 in Serim High School; Ja-sung's friend and fellow basketball player who also bullies Shi-woo. His father also bribes Choi Il-kwon so he can play in official games. It is presumed that he, like Ja-sung, began to befriend Si-woo and apologises to him for bullying him in the past.

==== People from JBC News ====
- Jang Hyuk-jin as Heo Woong-gi

Manager of the announcer department at JBC. Despite his reluctance, Woong-gi is ordered by the Director to do anything he can to make Jung Da-jung quit the internship. He later succeeds Sang-hwi as the Director of JBC News.

- Ahn Nae-sang as Moon Sang-hwi

Director of JBC News. A prejudiced senior, Sang-hwi dislikes the fact that Jung Da-jung passed the blind test and has been accepted as an intern despite being a mother in her thirties, and a teenage mother at that. He initially orders Woong-gi to make Da-jung quit the internship during her probation period, but he becomes fond of her due to the skills and talent she manifests at work. He later regrets his prejudice against Da-jung after she left the company.

- Kim Yoon-hye as Kwon Yu-mi

One of the four intern announcers (which includes Da-jung) at JBC. Yu-mi is the youngest among the interns and she always feels threatened by Da-jung's existence in the company, and viewed her and the other interns as rivals. However, after Da-jung saved her in an incident, she tried to repay her and successfully let her return to work in JBC after she was expelled from the company, and she grew to become more amicable towards her colleagues after this incident.

- Ko Eun-min as Lim Ja-young

One of the four intern announcers at JBC. Ja-young is friendly towards Da-jung and Gi-tae and is annoyed at Yu-mi's conceit and sense of competition towards them.

- Yang Dae-hyuk as Nam Gi-tae

One of the four intern announcers at JBC. Gi-tae is the only male intern among the four.

- Ahn Mi-na as Choi Ji-na

An announcer at JBC who is Yu-mi's senior.

==== Others ====
- Kim Yeon-jeong and Moon Woo-bin as Go Go Play employees

Go Deok-jin's subordinates. They are chance witnesses in awkward scenes involving Deok-jin, the turned-18-year-old Dae-young (posing as Woo-young) and Ae-rin, which leads to them mistakenly thinking that Woo-young is a severely disrespectful son, that Deok-jin is an irresponsible father, and that Ae-rin is Deok-jin's lover.

=== Special appearances ===
- Jun Hyun-moo as Bae Seung-hyun (Ep. 2)

One of the evaluators during the announcer casting blind test at JBC.

- Jang Sung-kyu as himself (Ep. 2)

An applicant during the announcer casting at JBC.

- Im Ji-kyu as Ji-hoon's older brother
- Song Yoo-hyun as Ji-hoon's brother's ex-girlfriend and Seo-yeon's biological mother who selfishly and cruelly abandoned her when she was a baby. When reunited in Episode 15, she refused to acknowledge Seo-yeon and even coldly said openly that she did not remember having a daughter, much to Seo-yeon's extreme sadness and Ji-hoon's anger and shock.
- Hur Jae as Coach at 2009 KBU draft (Ep. 8)
- Heo Jung-min as Ae-rin's ex-boyfriend
- Cho Ryeon as Dae-young's mother
- Lee Eol as Il-kwon's father
- Do Won-kyung as a Serim High School graduate and singer
- Kim Dong-hyun as a self-defense trainer (Ep. 10)
- Lee Do-ha as the black manicurist, Lee Sang-sik (Ep. 10)
- Moon Ji-in as a wife in Couples in Crisis (Ep. 11)
- Heo Jae-ho as a husband in Couples in Crisis (Ep. 11)
- Kim Ho-chang as a husband in Couples in Crisis (Ep. 11)

== Episodes ==
No.	English title	Korean title	Original release date	South Korea viewers (millions)
1	"Life Goes On"	삶은 계속된다	September 21, 2020	N/A (<0.487)
2	"About the Things That Made You Smile"	너를 웃게 만든 것에 대해서	September 22, 2020	0.653
3	"A Story About Rain and You"	비와 당신의 이야기	September 28, 2020	0.773
4	"The Boy We Loved Back Then"	그 시절, 우리가 사랑했던 소년	September 29, 2020	0.749
5	"First Loves Never Come True"	첫사랑은 이루어지지 않는다	October 5, 2020	0.853
6	"A Sincere Heart of Her Number 1 Fan"	어느 1호 팬의 진심	October 6, 2020	0.771
7	"Someone Who Gives Courage to Me"	내게 용기를 주는 사람	October 12, 2020	0.842
8	"The Story Only I Didn't Know"	나만 몰랐었던 이야기	October 13, 2020	0.865
9	"Things You Notice Only After You Have Lost Them"	잃고 나면 보이는 것들	October 19, 2020	0.911
10	"If I Love Again"	다시 사랑한다면	October 20, 2020	0.799
11	"Lost Love"	사랑을 놓치다	October 26, 2020	0.679
12	"Half-moon"	반달	October 27, 2020	0.656
13	"The Man That Makes My Heart Flutter"	나를 설레게 하는 남자	November 2, 2020	0.819
14	"I Miss You"	보고 싶다	November 3, 2020	0.779
15	"Confession"	고백	November 9, 2020	0.734
16	"Life Goes On"	삶은 계속된다	November 10, 2020	0.736

== Production ==
The series adaptation is directed by Ha Byung-hoon, who also helmed the similarly themed romantic fantasy drama Go Back in 2017.

18 Again was originally scheduled to premiere on September 7, 2020, but it was postponed by two weeks due to the COVID-19 pandemic.

== Original soundtrack ==
18 Again: OST Special Album

Soundtrack album by Various artists
- Released: November 10, 2020
- Genre: Soundtrack
- Length: 111:49
- Languages: Korean; English
- Labels: Kakao M; JTBC Studio; Most Contents

=== 18 Again: OST Special Album ===
The drama's soundtrack is compiled in a two-part album released on 10 November 2020. CD 1 and CD 2 contain the drama's theme songs and musical score, respectively.

CD 1
No.	Title	Lyrics	Music	Artist	Length
1.	"The Only One" (하나면 돼요)	CR Kim; Kim Soo-bin (Aiming); Clef Crew	CR Kim; Kim Soo-bin (Aiming); Clef Crew	Soyou (Sistar)	4:02
2.	"Hello"	Hana; Lee Yong-min	Lee Yong-min; Choi Jae-hyuk	Sohyang	4:04
3.	"If You" (너였으면)	Eun Jong-dae; Yoo Ji-ho (CLEF); Clef Crew	Eun Jong-dae; Choi Cheon-geun; Yoo Ji-ho (CLEF); Clef Crew	Choi Nakta	3:24
4.	"One Person" (한사람)	GamDongis; Han Seung-taek; Ahn Sung-wook	GamDongis; Han Seung-taek	Solji (EXID)	4:02
5.	"How To Love"	Jay Lee; Yoo Song-yeon	Yoo Song-yeon; Jay Lee	Sondia	3:09
6.	"Moments Become Memories" (기억은 추억이 된다)	Honey Pot	Honey Pot	Jukjae	4:08
7.	"Somebody"	Moon Sung-nam (Every Single Day)	Moon Sung-nam (Every Single Day)	Clara C	3:43
8.	"If We Love Again" (다시 사랑한다면)	Kang Eun-kyung	Kim Tae-won	Yoon Sang-hyun	3:51
9.	"First Time"	Moon Sung-nam (Every Single Day)	Moon Sung-nam (Every Single Day); Shim Ji; Gravity	Every Single Day	3:12
Total length:					33:35

CD 2
No.	Title	Artist	Length
1.	"Be Courageous"	Park Jung-in	0:53
2.	"Country Man"	Romantisco	2:46
3.	"Burning 18"	Jung Cha-shik	2:06
4.	"Rocking Cute"	Moon Sung-nam (Every Single Day)	1:55
5.	"New Beginning"	Kim Jung-hwan	2:22
6.	"I Got A Dream"	Kim Hong-kap	2:51
7.	"Guess Who"	Maeng Jae-joon	1:06
8.	"Be Loyal"	Son Han-mook	2:37
9.	"First Time Eb"	Kim Young-jin	1:16
10.	"Generations"	Romantisco	1:04
11.	"Daddy Strings"	Moon Sung-nam (Every Single Day)	3:49
12.	"Heart Shaking"	Moon Sung-nam (Every Single Day)	2:25
13.	"Reminiscence"	Park Jung-in	3:21
14.	"Funny Bunny"	Maeng Jae-joon	2:08
15.	"Buddy"	Kim Hong-kap	3:42
16.	"Fight Master"	Moon Sung-nam (Every Single Day); Lee Jae-woong	2:32
17.	"Somebody Lonely Gt."	Moon Sung-nam (Every Single Day)	2:32
18.	"Gamecraft"	Romantisco	1:35
19.	"My Son Strings"	Moon Sung-nam (Every Single Day)	5:23
20.	"When I Am With You"	Kim Hong-kap	2:38
21.	"Thrash"	Jung Cha-shik	2:35
22.	"Mismatch"	Romantisco	2:27
23.	"Blue Mood"	Moon Sung-nam (Every Single Day)	3:22
24.	"So Sweet"	Park Jung-in	1:10
25.	"My Day"	Kim Young-jin	1:23
26.	"One More Chance"	Son Han-mook	2:45
27.	"Somebody Gt. Happy"	Moon Sung-nam (Every Single Day)	2:35
28.	"I Am"	Jung Cha-shik	0:34
29.	"Morning"	Kim Jung-hwan	2:44
30.	"Too Late"	Kim Young-jin	1:15
31.	"Regret"	Son Han-mook	2:34
32.	"Fight On"	Jung Cha-shik	2:27
33.	"First Time Piano Comic"	Moon Sung-nam (Every Single Day)	3:22
Total length:			1:18:14

18 Again: Original Soundtrack Parts 1–9

Part 1

Released on September 22, 2020
No.	Title	Lyrics	Music	Artist	Length
1.	"The Only One" (하나면 돼요)	CR Kim; Kim Soo-bin (Aiming); Clef Crew	CR Kim; Kim Soo-bin (Aiming); Clef Crew	Soyou (Sistar)	4:02
2.	"The Only One" (Inst.)		CR Kim; Kim Soo-bin (Aiming); Clef Crew		4:02
Total length:					8:04

Part 2

Released on September 28, 2020
No.	Title	Lyrics	Music	Artist	Length
1.	"Hello"	Hana; Lee Yong-min	Lee Yong-min; Choi Jae-hyuk	Sohyang	4:04
2.	"Hello" (Inst.)		Lee Yong-min; Choi Jae-hyuk		4:04
Total length:					8:08

Part 3

Released on September 29, 2020
No.	Title	Lyrics	Music	Artist	Length
1.	"If You" (너였으면)	Eun Jong-dae; Yoo Ji-ho (CLEF); Clef Crew	Eun Jong-dae; Choi Cheon-geun; Yoo Ji-ho (CLEF); Clef Crew	Choi Nakta	3:24
2.	"If You" (Inst.)		Eun Jong-dae; Choi Cheon-geun; Yoo Ji-ho (CLEF); Clef Crew		3:24
Total length:					6:48

Part 4

Released on October 5, 2020
No.	Title	Lyrics	Music	Artist	Length
1.	"One Person" (한사람)	GamDongis; Han Seung-taek; Ahn Sung-wook	GamDongis; Han Seung-taek	Solji (EXID)	4:02
2.	"One Person" (Inst.)		GamDongis; Han Seung-taek		4:02
Total length:					8:04

Part 5

Released on October 6, 2020
No.	Title	Lyrics	Music	Artist	Length
1.	"How To Love"	Jay Lee; Yoo Song-yeon	Yoo Song-yeon; Jay Lee	Sondia	3:09
2.	"How To Love" (Inst.)		Yoo Song-yeon; Jay Lee		3:09
Total length:					6:18

Part 6

Released on October 13, 2020
No.	Title	Lyrics	Music	Artist	Length
1.	"Moments Become Memories" (기억은 추억이 된다)	Honey Pot	Honey Pot	Jukjae	4:08
2.	"Moments Become Memories" (Inst.)		Honey Pot		4:08
Total length:					8:16

Part 7

Released on October 18, 2020
No.	Title	Lyrics	Music	Artist	Length
1.	"Somebody"	Moon Sung-nam (Every Single Day)	Moon Sung-nam (Every Single Day)	Clara C	3:43
2.	"Somebody" (Inst.)		Moon Sung-nam (Every Single Day)		3:43
Total length:					7:26

Part 8

Released on October 20, 2020
No.	Title	Lyrics	Music	Artist	Length
1.	"If We Love Again" (다시 사랑한다면)	Kang Eun-kyung	Kim Tae-won	Yoon Sang-hyun	3:51
2.	"If We Love Again" (Inst.)		Kim Tae-won		3:51
Total length:					7:42

Part 9

Released on October 27, 2020
No.	Title	Lyrics	Music	Artist	Length
1.	"First Time"	Moon Sung-nam (Every Single Day)	Moon Sung-nam (Every Single Day); Shim Ji; Gravity	Every Single Day	3:12
2.	"First Time" (Inst.)		Moon Sung-nam (Every Single Day); Shim Ji; Gravity		3:12
Total length:					6:24

== Viewership ==
18 Again : South Korea viewers per episode (thousands)

Season	Episode number															
Season	1	2	3	4	5	6	7	8	9	10	11	12	13	14	15	16
1	N/A	653	773	749	853	771	842	865	911	799	679	656	819	779	734	736

Source: Audience measurement performed nationwide by Nielsen Korea.

Average TV viewership ratings
Ep.	Original broadcast date	Average audience share (Nielsen Korea)	
Ep.	Original broadcast date	Nationwide	Seoul
1	September 21, 2020	1.753% (9th)	—N/a
2	September 22, 2020	2.417% (14th)	—N/a
3	September 28, 2020	2.674% (9th)	2.494% (8th)
4	September 29, 2020	2.532% (13th)	2.531% (8th)
5	October 5, 2020	3.209% (6th)	2.987% (7th)
6	October 6, 2020	2.786% (11th)	2.855% (10th)
7	October 12, 2020	2.803% (10th)	—N/a
8	October 13, 2020	3.157% (6th)	3.220% (5th)
9	October 19, 2020	3.117% (5th)	2.969% (4th)
10	October 20, 2020	3.192% (6th)	2.985% (6th)
11	October 26, 2020	2.573% (10th)	2.423% (8th)
12	October 27, 2020	2.256% (13th)	2.315% (10th)
13	November 2, 2020	2.824% (10th)	2.797% (6th)
14	November 3, 2020	2.878% (10th)	—N/a
15	November 9, 2020	2.683% (13th)	—N/a
16	November 10, 2020	2.743% (12th)	—N/a
Average		2.725%	— (Note: Due to some ratings not recorded, the exact average rating is unknown.)
In the table above, the blue numbers represent the lowest ratings and the red numbers represent the highest ratings.; N/A denotes that the rating is not known.; This drama aired on a cable channel/pay TV which normally has a relatively smaller audience compared to free-to-air TV/public broadcasters (KBS, SBS, MBC and EBS).

== Awards and nominations ==
Name of the award ceremony, year presented, category, nominee of the award, and the result of the nomination
Award ceremony	Year	Category	Nominee	Result	Ref.
APAN Star Awards	2021	Best New Actor	Lee Do-hyun	Won	
Baeksang Arts Awards	2021	Best New Actor	Lee Do-hyun	Won	
