= Can't Lose =

2011 South Korean TV series

- Promotional poster for Can't Lose
- Also known as: Can't Live With Losing; Hate to Lose
- Hangul: 지고는 못살아
- RR: Jigoneun motsara
- MR: Chigonŭn mossara
- Genre: Romantic comedy Legal drama
- Based on: The Sasaki Couple's Merciless Battle by Morishita Yoshiko
- Written by: Lee Sook-jin
- Directed by: Lee Jae-dong
- Starring: Choi Ji-woo; Yoon Sang-hyun; Jo Mi-ryung; Kim Jung-tae
- Country of origin: South Korea
- Original language: Korean
- No. of episodes: 18

Production
- Producer: Oh Kyung-hoon
- Production company: Victory Contents

Original release
- Network: Munhwa Broadcasting Corporation
- Release: August 24 – October 20, 2011

Can't Lose (Korean: 지고는 못살아; RR: Jigoneun motsara; lit. 'Can't Live With Losing') is a 2011 South Korean romantic comedy television series, starring Choi Ji-woo and Yoon Sang-hyun, who play two bickering, married divorce lawyers who take out their frustrations on each other in and out of the courtroom. It aired on MBC from August 24 to October 20, 2011, on Wednesdays and Thursdays at 21:55 for 18 episodes.

It is a remake of the 2008 Japanese drama The Sasaki Couple's Merciless Battle (佐々木夫妻の仁義なき戦い, Sasaki Fusai no Jingi Naki Tatakai).

== Plot ==
Eun-Jae (Choi Ji-woo) and Hyung-Woo (Yoon Sang-hyun) have been married for one year. They are both lawyers.

They first met at a baseball game when they happened to have seats next to each other. During the baseball game they kissed and fell in love. Hyung-Woo told Eun-Jae that he wants to become a human rights lawyer. Eun-Jae supports his dream and they opened their own law firm together.

One year later, the thrill is gone in their relationship. Eun-Jae struggles to maintain the law firm alone, while Hyung-Woo helps clients who are not able to pay much for his services. Their interests have also diverged. One day, the couple learns that Eun-Jae did not register their marriage. The next day, Eun-Jae goes to file the proper papers. Eun-Jae is unhappy that Hyung-Woo is so generous to others and wants him to think about her more. Later on, Hyung-Woo's friends, who are a couple, stops by the law firm and the wife, Young-Joo (Jo Mi-ryung) insists that she wants a divorce. Young-Joo states that her husband Ki-Chan (Kim Jung-tae) hasn't worked in years and, yet, still gave his family a large sum of money. The married couple start yelling at each other. Ki-Chan states that he borrowed the money from Hyung-Woo.

Meanwhile, Eun-Jae hears of the loan and has had enough. Eun-Jae decides that they need a serious talk. Eun-Jae and Hyung-Woo then book a trip to Japan where they had their honeymoon. Hyung-Woo then mistakenly text messages his itinerary to his mother instead of Eun-Jae. When Hyung-Woo and Eun-Jae arrive at the airport they find Hyung-Woo's mother there as well, believing she was invited to their trip to Japan. Making matters worse Hyung-Woo receives a phone call from his mother-in-law asking to see him immediately and to keep it a secret. Hyung-Woo doesn't know why his wife and his mother-in-law doesn't get along or why he was never formally introduced to his mother-in-law, but he feels obligated to meet her and leaves ...

== Cast ==
- Choi Ji-woo as Lee Eun-jae
- Yoon Sang-hyun as Yeon Hyung-woo
- Kim Jung-tae as Go Ki-chan
- Jo Mi-ryung as Kim Young-joo
- Park Won-sook as Yoo Jung-nan
- Sung Dong-il as Jo Jung-goo
- Joo Jin-mo as Kang Woo-shik
- Kim Ja-ok as Hong Geum-ji
- Ha Seok-jin as Lee Tae-young
- Ga Deuk-hee as Ga Deuk-hee
- Kim Jin-woo as So Joo-hyun
- Song Jae-ho as Grandfather (guest, ep 1–4)
- Lee Soo-kyung as Eun Hee-soo (guest, ep 3–5)
- Kim Na-woon as Eun-jae's divorce lawyer (guest, ep 5)
- Lee Sang-yeob as Yeon Hyung-joo, Hyung-woo's younger brother (guest, ep 6,9)
- Ahn Yong-joon as Jung Ji-ho (guest, ep 12–13)
- Um Ki-joon as Cha Seok-hoon (guest, ep 14–17)
- Kang Boo-ja (guest)
- Shin Goo as Go Jung-dae (cameo)

== Ratings ==
| Episode # | Original broadcast date | Average audience share | | | |
| Episode # | Original broadcast date | TNmS Ratings | | AGB Nielsen | |
| Episode # | Original broadcast date | Nationwide | Seoul National Capital Area | Nationwide | Seoul National Capital Area |
|---|---|---|---|---|---|
| 1 | 2011 August 24 | 6.4% | 8.0% | 6.2% | 6.6% |
| 2 | 2011 August 25 | 5.7% | 7.4% | 6.9% | 8.7% |
| 3 | 2011 August 31 | 5.0% | 7.1% | 6.0% | 8.2% |
| 4 | 2011 September 1 | 4.6% | 6.1% | 6.6% | 8.2% |
| 5 | 2011 September 7 | 5.7% | 7.1% | 6.3% | 8.8% |
| 6 | 2011 September 8 | 5.4% | 7.0% | 5.8% | 7.4% |
| 7 | 2011 September 14 | 5.9% | 8.3% | 6.7% | 9.1% |
| 8 | 2011 September 15 | 5.9% | 7.8% | 6.6% | 8.6% |
| 9 | 2011 September 21 | 8.9% | 10.5% | 10.2% | 11.3% |
| 10 | 2011 September 22 | 5.3% | 6.5% | 5.8% | 7.0% |
| 11 | 2011 September 28 | 5.0% | 6.5% | 5.6% | 7.1% |
| 12 | 2011 September 29 | 5.5% | 7.8% | 6.1% | 8.4% |
| 13 | 2011 October 5 | 6.0% | 8.1% | 6.9% | 9.0% |
| 14 | 2011 October 6 | 5.9% | 8.0% | 6.4% | 8.6% |
| 15 | 2011 October 12 | 7.2% | 9.3% | 8.0% | 8.5% |
| 16 | 2011 October 13 | 6.0% | 8.1% | 7.8% | 9.2% |
| 17 | 2011 October 19 | 6.6% | 7.5% | 7.9% | 8.9% |
| 18 | 2011 October 20 | 6.0% | 6.7% | 7.5% | 8.2% |
| Average | | 5.9% | 7.6% | 6.8% | 7.5% |

== International broadcast ==
- It aired in Japan on TBS from January 31 to February 25, 2013. It also aired in Malaysia on 8TV.
- It aired in Vietnam from July 31, 2012, on SCTV film channel, called Không thể mất em.
- It aired in Indonesia from April 3, 2013, on B-Channel film channel, called Can't Lose.
