= Lee Hang-na =

South Korean actress (born 1969)

- Born: 22 February 1969 (age 57); Seoul, South Korea
- Other name: Hangna
- Education: Dongguk University; Mikhail Shchepkin Higher Theatre School
- Occupations: Actress; director; professor
- Years active: 1988–present
- Agent: Inyeon Entertainment
- Known for: Vincenzo; Train; Black Dog: Being A Teacher

Korean name
- Hangul: 이항나
- RR: I Hangna
- MR: I Hangna

Lee Hang-na (Korean: 이항나; born 22 February 1969) is a South Korean actress, director and professor. She is known for her roles in dramas such as Vincenzo, Train, and Black Dog: Being A Teacher. She has also appeared in movies like Svaha: The Sixth Finger, Time to Hunt, and Golden Slumber.

== Filmography ==
=== Television series ===
Year	Title	Role	Notes	Ref.
2001	Still Love	Byeong-ho's mother		
2008	Keu Keu Island's Secret	President's wife		
2015	Assembly	Kim Gyeong-ah		
2015	KBS Drama Special: "Crimson Moon"	Queen Sun-hee		
2016	Begin Again	Song Ji-sook		
2017	Sisters-in-Law	Jung Yoon-hee		
2017	Strongest Deliveryman	Hyeon Soo's mother	Cameo	
2017	Money Flower	Han Eun-shim		
2019	The Wind Blows	Kim Hee-eun		
2019	Everything and Nothing	Lee Hae-young		
2019	Black Dog: Being A Teacher	Song Young-sook		
2020	Train	Oh Mi-sook		
2021	Vincenzo	Kwak Hee-soo		
2021–2022	The One and Only	Choi Seong-hae		
2022	Island	Won Bo-ram		
2023	Taxi Driver 2	Ahn Young-sook	Cameo, (Ep. 9–10)	
2024	Begins ≠ Youth	Shim Seon-mi		
2024	Queen of Tears	Prisoner		
2024	Dongjae, the Good or the Bastard	Jeon Mi-ran		
2025	Buried Hearts	Seong Bo-yeon		

=== Film ===
Year	Title	Role	Ref.
1999	Rainbow Trout	Yeong-sook	
2003	Love Impossible	Professor Yeon Byeon-dae	
2013	The Attorney	Su-gyeong	
2016	4th Place	Jeong-ae	
2018	The Discloser	Hee-kyung	
2018	Golden Slumber	Team Leader Oh	
2019	Svaha: The Sixth Finger	Park Eun-hye	
2019	Bring Me Home	Ahn Kyung-ja	
2020	Time to Hunt	Gi-hoon's mother	
2020	Beyond That Mountain	Sou-hwan's mother	
2020	Jang Gae: The Foreigner	Kim Mi-sook	
2021	Story of You and the Rain	Young-ho's mother	
2024	Picnic	Yoon Mi-hyeon	

== Stage ==
=== Musical ===
Musical play performances
Year	Title		Role	Theater	Date	Ref.
Year	English	Korean	Role	Theater	Date	Ref.
2010	Tick, Tick... Boom!	틱틱붐	Director	Chungmu Art Center Main Theater, Black	September 30, 2010 – November 7, 2010	

=== Theater ===
Theater play performances
Year	Title		Role	Theater	Date	Ref.
Year	English	Korean	Role	Theater	Date	Ref.
2004	Between Coldness and Passion	냉정과 열정사이		Daehak-ro Seolchi Theater Jeongmiso	March 11, 2004 – May 9, 2004	
2005	LittleShop of Horrors	리틀샵 오브 호러스		Dongsoong Art Center Dongsoong Hall	May 27, 2005 – August 7, 2005	
2007	The Seagull	갈매기	Arkadina	LG Art Center	March 15, 2007 – March 25, 2007	
2007	Open Couple	오픈커플	Wife	Daehak-ro Yeollin Theater	October 4, 2007 – November 25, 2007	
2008–2009	Closer	클로저	Subin	December 5 to February 8	CJ Ajit Daehak-ro (formerly SM Art Hall)	
2010	Marriage of Hwiga-ro	휘가로의 결혼	Countess	Arko Arts Theater Main Theater	December 10, 2010 – December 26, 2010	
2010	Director on Stage: Naptime	감독 무대로 오다 시리즈 2탄 - 낮잠	Kim I-sun	Baekam Art Hall	January 26, 2010 – March 28, 2010	
2011	Asian Suite	아시안 스위트	Chioko	Daehak-ro Arts Theater Small Theater	June 30, 2011 – July 14, 2011	
2011	Asian Suite	아시안 스위트	Chioko	Sogakjang Gongyu (formerly Kijageun Sonamu) Small Theater	July 23, 2011 – July 31, 2011	
2012	The Inventor Next Door	이웃집 발명가	Audience	Hanyang Repertoire Theater	August 17, 2012 – September 2, 2012	
2013	Autumn Firefly	가을 반딧불이	Matsumi	Daehak-ro Arts Theater Main Theater	June 14, 2013 – June 30, 2013	
2013	The House That Doesn't Knock	노크하지 않는 집	Director	Daehak-ro Arts Theater Small Theater	September 7, 2013 – September 22, 2013	
2014	Autumn Firefly	가을 반딧불이	Matsumi	Daehak-ro Arts Theater Main Theater	February 7, 2014 – March 2, 2014	
2014	Rabbit Hole	래빗홀	Becca	Daehak-ro Arts Theater Small Theater	August 21, 2014 – September 6, 2014	
2015	The House That Doesn't Knock	노크하지 않는 집	Director	Daehak-ro Arts Theater Small Theater	December 23, 2015 – December 27, 2015	
2016	Come See Me	배우 날 보러와요	Park Gi-ja	Myeongdong Arts Theater	January 22–February 21	
2016	Come See Me	배우 날 보러와요	Park Gi-ja	CJB Media Center Art Hall	March 25 to 27	
2016	Come See Me	배우 날 보러와요	Park Gi-ja	Gyeongju Arts Center Main Performance Hall (Hwarang Hall)	April 2 to 3	
2019	Kamikaze Arirang	가미카제 아리랑	Kim Yu-ja	Daehakro Arts Theater Small Theater Station	February 9 to 17	
2020	Sweatshirt	스웨트	Cynthia	Myeongdong Arts Theater Station	September 4 to 27	
2022–2023	The Seagull	갈매기	Arghona	Universal Arts Center	Dec 21-Feb 5	
2024	Hamlet	햄릿	Actor 2	Hongik University Daehakro Art Center Main Theater	June 9, 2024 – September 1, 2024	

== Bibliography ==
- Breathing and Sound Training for Voice Acting

== Awards and nominations ==
- 2000 The 36th Dong-A Theater Awards Acting Awards
- 2001 Korea Theater Association's Best 5 Best Acting Awards
