= Choi Nakta =

South Korean singer (born 1990)

- Born: Choi Jung-ho; February 9, 1990 (age 36); South Korea
- Education: Dong-ah Institute of Media and Arts (Department of Instrumental Performance)
- Genres: Folks; Blues; Korean indie
- Occupations: Singer; Songwriter
- Years active: 2013–present

Korean name
- Hangul: 최정호
- RR: Choe Jeongho
- MR: Ch'oe Chŏngho

Choi Jung-ho (Korean: 최정호; born February 9, 1990), known professionally by his stage name Choi Nakta (Korean: 최낙타), is a South Korean indie singer and songwriter. He debuted in 2013 with a song, Ice Cream.

== Biography ==
Choi is the only child of Choi Jae-sung, a former member of the Democratic Party of South Korea.

He began playing the guitar in middle school and later majored in guitar in the Department of Instrumental Performance at the Dong-ah Institute of Media and Arts.

On November 1, 2025, He held a wedding ceremony with his non-celebrity girlfriend in Gangnam, Seoul, South Korea.

== Career ==
Since high school, he was nicknamed Camel, because he was slow and sluggish, which later led him to choose the stage name, Nakta (낙타) for his music career.

In 2011, after his discharge from military service, Choi was active as a guitarist in the jazz band Room217, whose members were all students at the Dong-ah Institute of Media and Arts. The group released an album and performed regularly at live concerts. However, it eventually disbanded after one senior member got married. He was also a member of the acoustic band, Red Chair.

In 2013, Choi debuted as a singer with the song, Ice Cream (얼음땡), The song was later used in a commercial for the coffee shop brand, Angel-in-us. Later, released second song, Let’s Stop Fighting (우리 그만 싸우자), in 2014.

In 2015, Choi signed with Table Sound. He released Extended Play, Bad, Bad (나빠나빠) and held his first solo concert.

In 2017, Choi released his first album, Piece One (조각, 하나) with a title song, Grab Me. Later, the song was used for original soundtrack of KBS2 drama, To. Jenny sung by, Kim Sung-cheol.

In 2018, Choi released the second part of the first album, Piece Two (조각, 둘) with a title song, Love Professor (연애박사) with Exy.

In 2023, Choi signed an exclusive contract with KH Company.

In 2024, Choi released the first full-length album, a colorless footprint (무색의 발자취), with a title song with the same name.

In July 2025, his contract with the KH Company has expired.

== Discography ==
=== Studio albums ===
Title	Album details
Piece One (조각, 하나)	Released: April 12, 2017 Track listing: 1. Grab Me; 2. Areurooreura (아를오오를아); 3. Childish (유치); 4. Eueu (으으); 5. Kuk-kuk (쿡쿡) (Feat. An Da-eun Of The ADE); 6. Scene#6
Piece Two (조각, 둘)	Released: December 23, 2018 Track listing: 1. Love Professor (연애박사) (feat. Exy); 2. PIG; 3. Insomnia (불면증); 4. WELCOME; 5. A day when I don't want to answer the phone (전화 받기 싫은 날); 6. Please (부탁해)
a colorless footprint (무색의 발자취)	Released: August 21, 2024 Track listing: 1. One note love 2. a colorless footprint (무색의 발자취); 3. TOY (Feat. siso); 4. SISAM; 5. Can't broke up (정리가 잘 안돼); 6. SOMETIME.. (가끔); 7. Maybe don't know love (나는 아마 사랑을); 8. SUMMER WITHOUT LOVE; 9. Complicated mind (그건 너무 이상한 마음이죠); 10. HOMETOWN

=== Extended plays ===
Title	Album details
Bad, Bad (나빠나빠)	Released: August 27, 2015 Track listing: 1. Arm Pillow (팔베개); 2. Bad, Bad (나빠나빠); 3. I'm Not Jealous (질투가 아냐); 4. Yakult Lady (야쿠르트 아줌마); 5. Scene#5
NAK! H! (낙! H!)	Released: July 12, 2023 Track listing: 1. DRIVER; 2. Chit! (칫!) (Feat. Mingginyu); 3. PUFF (뻐끔) (Feat. CHOILB); 4. Scramble (스크램블); 5. CHEERS MY DEAR

=== Singles ===
Title	Year	Peak chart positions	Album
Title	Year	KOR	Album
As lead artist
"Ice Cream" (얼음땡)	2013	—	Non-album singles
"Let's stop fighting" (우리 그만 싸우자)	2014	—	Non-album singles
"Cute" (귀여워)	2015	—	Non-album singles
"Love Puzzle" (사랑은 아무리 해도 어려워)	2016	—	Non-album singles
"Eueu" (으으)	2016	—	Piece One (조각, 하나)
"Areurooreura" (아를오오를아)	2016	—	Piece One (조각, 하나)
"HIDE AND SEEK" (숨바꼭질)	2016	—	Non-album singles
"Just Friend"	2019	—	Non-album singles
"NERD"	2019	—	Non-album singles
"WSID" (어떡해) (with Park Kyung)	2020	—	Non-album singles
"That Night" (고집) (with Hoyeon Kim)	2020	—	Non-album singles
"HERB"	2022	—	Non-album singles
"DRIVER"	2023	—	NAK! H! (낙! H!)
"TOY"	2023	—	NAK! H! (낙! H!)
"a colorless footprint" (무색의 발자취)	2024	—	a colorless footprint (무색의 발자취)
Soundtrack appearances
"Confession" (고백)	2017	—	Go Back Couple OST Part.4
"You Are Really Pretty" (너 정말 예쁘다)	2018	—	A Poem a Day OST Part.7
"You And I"	2019	—	Best Mistake OST Part.2
"Blooming" (꽃이 피었네)	2020	—	Welcome OST Part.13
"If You" (너였으면)	2020	—	18 Again OST Part.13
"One Step Closer" (한 걸음 가까이)	2021	—	My Roommate Is a Gumiho OST Part.4
"Wounded Heart" (마음의 상처)	2023	—	Poong, the Joseon Psychiatrist OST Part.4
"—" denotes release did not chart.

== Filmography ==
=== Television shows ===
Year	Title	Role	Notes	Ref.
2019	Studio Vibes	Participant		
2025	The Gentlemen's League 4	Cast member		
2025	King of Mask Singer	Participant		
