= Gap-dong =

South Korean television series

- Hangul: 갑동이
- RR: Gapdongi
- MR: Kaptongi
- Genre: Crime; Thriller; Drama; Mystery; Action
- Written by: Kwon Eum-mi
- Directed by: Jo Soo-won
- Starring: Yoon Sang-hyun; Kim Min-jung; Sung Dong-il; Kim Ji-won; Lee Joon
- Country of origin: South Korea
- Original language: Korean
- No. of episodes: 20

Production
- Executive producers: Bae Jong-byung; Kim Hee-yeol
- Producers: Kang Hee-jun; Lee Young-ok
- Production location: Korea
- Running time: 60 minutes
- Production company: Pan Entertainment

Original release
- Network: tvN
- Release: April 11 – June 21, 2014

Gap-dong (Korean: 갑동이) is a 2014 South Korean television series starring Yoon Sang-hyun, Kim Min-jung, Sung Dong-il, Kim Ji-won and Lee Joon. It aired on cable channel tvN from April 11 to June 14, 2014 on Fridays and Saturdays at 20:40 (KST) for 20 episodes.

The series is based on the real-life Hwaseong serial murders.

== Synopsis ==
In 1986, the (fictional) city of Iltan in Gyeonggi Province: A young girl gets brutally murdered by an unknown person on a dark night. As the city is gripped by a succession of serial killings, a total of nine murders within a twelve-kilometer radius since 1993, the police conclude that a man they've nicknamed "Gap-dong" is behind the crimes. Detective Yang Cheol-gon is convinced that the actual killer is Ha Il-sik, a resident of the town who is intellectually challenged. His attempt to arrest the suspect fails as Ha commits suicide to prove his innocence. His death inspires his son Moo-yeom to become a police officer to clear his father's name and restore his honor.

Seventeen years later, Moo-yeom is a police detective who spends his career chasing dead ends and helping juvenile delinquents. After the statute of limitations on the case expires, Moo-yeom becomes resigned to the belief that Gap-dong is dead. But then a series of incidents occur in the town that bear an eerie resemblance to Gap-dong's crimes. Cheol-gon, now a well-decorated officer, has recently transferred back to Iltan, and to his dismay, Moo-yeom joins his investigation team to catch Gap-dong once and for all.

== Cast ==
=== Main ===
- Yoon Sang-hyun as Ha Moo-yeom, a detective in Iltan Police Department's violent crimes unit. He vows to avenge his wrongly accused father.
- Kim Min-jung as Maria Oh, a psychiatrist with a mysterious double life and a suspicious curiosity for all things Gap-dong.
- Sung Dong-il as Yang Cheol-gon, a police inspector at the time of the original murders, and is now a well-decorated officer. Upon receiving his latest promotion, he surprises his superiors by requesting to be assigned back to Iltan, because he wants to end his career by capturing Gap-dong. Still convinced that Moo-yeom's father was the killer, he is extremely prejudiced against Moo-yeom, which makes for a combative working relationship. He also hiding grief of his daughter's death.
- Kim Ji-won as Ma Ji-wool, a 17-year-old high school student and webtoon artist with the pen name "Matilda". Ji-wool becomes pivotal to the case when her webtoon titled The Beast's Path ends up foretelling the crimes. When she becomes the killer's next target, it also serves as a set of clues to find him.
- Lee Joon as Ryu Tae-oh, an inmate of a prison psychiatric hospital, who becomes a barista after his release. With a genius IQ of 150, his excellent and detailed memory may prove valuable to cracking the case, but he also happens to have the disposition to be a dangerous psychopath, and considers Gap-dong his god and hero.

=== Supporting ===
- Jung In-gi as Cha Do-hyeok, the police section chief.
  - Hyun Woo as young Cha Do-hyeok
- Kang Nam-gil as Han Sang-hoon, a profiler
- Jang Gwang as Jinjo, a monk
- Choo Soo-hyun as Oh Young-ae
- Lee Seung-ho as Kim Shin-yong
- Yoo Eun-ho as Yang Seon-joo, Cheol-gon's daughter
  - Lee Go-eun as young Seon-joo
- Min Sung-wook as Nam Ki-ri
- Jung Won-joong as Park Joong-goo
- Jang Hee-soo as Kim Young-mi, Maria's mother
- Yoon Kyun-sang as the youngest detective
- Seo Cho-won as Supporting
- Hong In-young as Hong Sung-hee, a reporter
- Seo Joo-hee as Ji Hwa-ja, Ji-wool's mother
- Jo Ji-hwan as Lee Hyung-nyeon, Moo-yeom's partner and wife

== Ratings ==
In this table, the blue numbers represent the lowest ratings and the red numbers represent the highest ratings.

Ep.	Original broadcast date	Average audience share
Ep.	Original broadcast date	AGB Nielsen
Ep.	Original broadcast date	Nationwide
1	April 11, 2014	1.51%
2	April 12, 2014	1.98%
3	April 25, 2014	1.37%
4	April 26, 2014	1.64%
5	May 2, 2014	1.77%
6	May 3, 2014	1.76%
7	May 9, 2014	1.81%
8	May 10, 2014	2.32%
9	May 16, 2014	1.72%
10	May 17, 2014	2.00%
11	May 23, 2014	1.89%
12	May 24, 2014	2.08%
13	May 30, 2014	1.68%
14	May 31, 2014	1.91%
15	June 6, 2014	2.32%
16	June 7, 2014	2.23%
17	June 13, 2014	1.85%
18	June 14, 2014	2.17%
19	June 20, 2014	2.07%
20	June 21, 2014	2.13%
Average		1.91%

- This drama airs on a cable channel/pay TV which normally has a relatively smaller audience compared to free-to-air TV/public broadcasters (KBS, SBS, MBC and EBS).

== Awards and nominations ==
Year	Award	Category	Recipient	Result
2014	7th Korea Drama Awards	Best New Actor	Lee Joon	Nominated

== International broadcast ==
- It aired in Thailand on Workpoint TV beginning March 9, 2015.
- In Hong Kong, Macau, Sri Lanka and Southeast Asia, the drama began airing on tvN Asia with a variety of subtitles on 2016.
