= Secret Garden (South Korean TV series) =

2010 South Korean TV series

- Promotional poster
- Genre: Romance; Comedy; Fantasy
- Written by: Kim Eun-sook
- Directed by: Shin Woo-chul; Kwon Hyuk-chan
- Starring: Ha Ji-won; Hyun Bin; Yoon Sang-hyun; Kim Sa-rang
- Music by: Choi Seung-wook
- Opening theme: Secret Garden
- Ending theme: Appear by Kim Bum-soo; That Woman by Baek Ji-young; That Man by Hyun Bin
- Country of origin: South Korea
- Original language: Korean
- No. of episodes: 20

Production
- Executive producer: Oh Se-kang
- Producer: Yoon Hye-rim
- Camera setup: Multi-camera
- Running time: 80 minutes
- Production company: Hwa&Dam Pictures

Original release
- Network: SBS TV
- Release: 13 November 2010 – 16 January 2011

Secret Garden (Korean: 시크릿 가든) is a 2010 South Korean television drama starring Ha Ji-won, Hyun Bin, Yoon Sang-hyun, and Kim Sa-rang. It aired on SBS from November 13, 2010 to January 16, 2011, on Saturdays and Sundays at 22:00 (KST) for 20 episodes.

== Synopsis ==
A rationalizing Cinderella story between Gil Ra-im (Ha Ji-won), a stuntwoman, and Kim Joo-won (Hyun Bin), a high-end department store CEO.

While trying to resolve a scandal involving Joo-won's cousin, Oska (Yoon Sang-hyun), (a famous singer), Ra-im and Joo-won meet and he finds himself stunned by her coolness. Joo-won does not understand why Ra-im is constantly on his mind, and decides to pursue her. Though she initially is repelled by him, Ra-im gradually starts reciprocating his feelings.

As two different worlds collide, Ra-im and Joo-won gradually learn about each other's worlds. Joo-won's mother does not want them to love each other. Despite his mother's objections, they get married.

Meanwhile, Oska reunites with his first love, Yoon Seul (Kim Sa-rang), who has made a successful directing career for herself. However, Yoon Seul wants nothing to do with Oska, and instead has her eyes set on Joo-won. The story gets even more complicated when Ra-im and Joo-won magically start switching bodies.

== Cast ==
=== Main ===
- Ha Ji-won as Gil Ra-im

Tough but secretly lonely, Gil Ra-im works as a stunt woman for an action school that is run by director Im Jong-soo. Due to her father's death when she was in high school, she works hard and doesn't like relying on other people. Her one obsession is Oska, a famous Hallyu star. She meets the arrogant CEO, Kim Joo-won and although she initially dislikes him, their body swap brings about confusing feelings.

- Hyun Bin as Kim Joo-won

The CEO of a high-end departmental store, he is good-looking but arrogant. A childhood trauma caused him to have a defective memory and claustrophobia, causing him to be unable to take lifts. As a rational person, he always seeks answers and solutions to explain things that happen to him. When he meets the spunky Gil Ra-im, he is left confused as he does not understand why she is constantly on his mind. He also finds it hard to accept that she does not seem to care about him or what he is going through because of her.

- Yoon Sang-hyun as Choi Woo-young (Oska)

A famous Hallyu star who is slowly losing his popularity. He is Joo-won's cousin, as well as the first love of Yoon Seul. Frivolous and free-spirited, Oska used to rely on his charming looks and money, but seeing Seul again and discovering new talent in a young man named Tae-sun triggers something inside him, causing him to change.

- Kim Sa-rang as Yoon Seul

Oska's first love. She is a music video director. Unable to forgive Oska, she is bent on making him hurt as much as possible. However nearing the end of the series, they decided to give each other a chance to make dreams happen.

=== Supporting ===
- Lee Phillip as Lim Jong-soo

The director of an action school. Having studied abroad, Im Jong-soo speaks English fluently and is well connected with Hollywood. Despite his gruff and rough exterior, he cares about his stunt actors deeply and looks out for them. He holds a soft spot for Ra-im, who is oblivious to his feelings.

- Lee Jong-suk as Han Tae-sun

A young genius musician discovered by Oska in Jeju Island. Prickly and cold, he initially rebuffs Oska's attempts to recruit him. It is later revealed that he is gay and Oska becomes his muse.

- Yoo In-na as Im Ah-young

Ra-im's best friend who shares a loft with her. She works at the department store Joo-won owns.

- Kim Sung-oh as Secretary Kim

Joo-won's long-suffering assistant who has a crush on Im Ah-young.

- Park Joon-geum as Moon Boon-hong

Joo-won's mother.

- Kim Ji-sook as Moon Yeon-hong

Oska's mother.

- Choi Yoon-so as Kim Hee-won

Joo-won's sister who has a crush on Jong-soo.

- Kim Sang-kyum as Moon Chang-soo

Joo-won's grandfather. Chairman of Loel Department Store.

- Lee Byung-joon as Park Bong-ho

Joo-won's subordinate as well as great grand uncle. He aims to overthrow Joo-won as president and take over his position.

- Sung Byung-sook as Park Bong-hee

Moon Chang-soo's fourth wife, Park Bong-ho's sister.

- Yoon Ki-won as Choi Dong-kyu

Oska's long-suffering manager.

- Kim Gun as Yoo Jong-hun

Oska's assistant.

- Yoo Seo-jin as Park Ji-hyun

Joo-won's psychiatrist and long-term friend.

- Jang Seo-won as Hwang Jung-hwan

Ra-im's senior (sunbae) at the action school.

- Choi Dae-sung as Department Head Choi

Park Bong-ho's assistant.

- Moon Woong-ki as Sang-min

Member of action school.

=== Special appearances ===
- Jung In-gi as Ra-im's father
- Baek Seung-hee as Park Chae-rin, an actress that Oska was involved with.
- Ryu Sung-hoon as Gangster
- Jo Jae-yoon as Photographer (ep. 3)
- Kim Mi-kyung as Owner of Restaurant in Mountain
- Hwang Seok-jeong as Korean dry sauna owner
- Lee Joon-hyuk as Joon-hyuk, Oska's frenemy who has a one-sided love for Yoon Seul.
- Yum Dong-hun as pervert in department store
- Heo Tae-hee as rude party guest
- Baek Ji-young as herself
- Kim Ye-won as actress in Oska's music video
- Son Ye-jin as herself
- Song Yoon-ah as Top star in giveaway event
- Song Jae-rim as singer

== Original soundtrack ==
Secret Garden OST

Soundtrack album by Various Artists
- Released: 2010
- Genres: Kpop; Soundtrack
- Languages: Korean; English
- Labels: Sony Group; Achieve Group DN

Disc 1
No.	Title	Artist	Length
1.	"That Woman"	Baek Ji-young	4:34
2.	"You Are My Spring"	Sung Si-kyung	4:29
3.	"Reason"	4men	4:02
4.	"Here I Am"	4men	3:55
5.	"Appear"	Kim Bum-soo	4:04
6.	"A Woman"	BEN	4:21
7.	"I Can't"	MIIII	4:27
8.	"Scar"	BOIS	4:11
9.	"Appear (Ballad ver.)"	Yoari	4:03
10.	"You Are My Everything"	Jung Ha-yoon	3:36
11.	"Here I Am (Piano ver.)"	MIIII	3:55

Disc 2
No.	Title	Artist	Length
1.	"That Man"	Hyun Bin	4:33
2.	"Tears Stain"	Yoon Sang-hyun	4:17
3.	"Liar"	Yoon Sang-hyun	3:33
4.	"Fairytale"	Yiruma	4:07
5.	"Watching"	Yoon Sang-hyun	4:30
6.	"Here I Am (Piano Ver.)"	Yoon Sang-hyun	2:13
7.	"Main Title"	Various Artists	1:46
8.	"Lovely Oscar"	Various Artists	1:24
9.	"Guardian Angel"	Various Artists	2:09
10.	"Mysterious Garden"	Various Artists	2:22
11.	"Love Potion"	Various Artists	1:21
12.	"My Darling Lime"	Various Artists	1:31
13.	"Secret Garden"	Various Artists	2:44
14.	"Confusion"	Various Artists	1:26
15.	"My Daddy"	Various Artists	1:52
16.	"Virgin Love"	Various Artists	1:20

== Reception ==
The drama received positive response from critics and audience for its story, comedy, performance of cast especially of leads Hyun Bin, Yoon Sang-hyun and Ha Ji-won and production values. Secret Garden was a huge ratings success, with an estimation of more than 20 billion won worth of economic effect. Hyun Bin's portrayal as Kim Joo-won created a "Hyun Bin Syndrome" as his name and face were plastered everywhere, from newspapers to television and the internet. It won a number of awards at both the 2010 SBS Drama Awards and the 47th Baeksang Arts Awards, including "Grand Prize (Daesang)" for Hyun Bin.

== Ratings ==
Ep.	Original broadcast date	Average audience share			
Ep.	Original broadcast date	Nielsen Korea		TNmS	
Ep.	Original broadcast date	Nationwide	Seoul	Nationwide	Seoul
1	November 13, 2010	17.2%	18.3%	16.1%	16.5%
2	November 14, 2010	14.8% (Note: Numbers representing the lowest ratings)	16.0%	15.0%	15.6%
3	November 20, 2010	18.2%	19.8%	17.9%	18.9%
4	November 21, 2010	21.5%	24.1%	20.0%	20.8%
5	November 27, 2010	23.6%	25.5%	25.4%	26.3%
6	November 28, 2010	20.9%	22.9%	25.2%	25.6%
7	December 4, 2010	22.2%	24.1%	24.1%	24.7%
8	December 5, 2010	22.3%	24.3%	24.6%	24.8%
9	December 11, 2010	24.7%	27.0%	27.0%	27.8%
10	December 12, 2010	25.1%	27.5%	28.0%	28.7%
11	December 18, 2010	23.7%	25.3%	27.0%	28.2%
12	December 19, 2010	24.7%	27.3%	28.2%	29.2%
13	December 25, 2010	22.1%	23.3%	24.4%	25.0%
14	December 26, 2010	24.1%	26.1%	26.5%	27.1%
15	January 1, 2011	26.6%	29.5%	23.0%	29.3%
16	January 2, 2011	26.9%	29.9%	23.9%	29.9%
17	January 8, 2011	28.1%	30.5%	23.8%	30.0%
18	January 9, 2011	30.6%	33.0%	27.4%	34.1%
19	January 15, 2011	33.0%	35.3%	29.1%	35.0%
20	January 16, 2011	35.2% (Note: Numbers representing the highest ratings)	37.9%	31.4%	38.6%
Average		24.3%	26.4%	24.4%	26.8%

== Awards and nominations ==
Year	Award	Category	Recipient	Result
2010	SBS Drama Awards	Top Excellence Award, Actor in a Drama Special	Hyun Bin	Won
2010	SBS Drama Awards	Top Excellence Award, Actress in a Drama Special	Ha Ji-won	Won
2010	SBS Drama Awards	Best Supporting Actress in a Drama Special	Kim Sa-rang	Nominated
2010	SBS Drama Awards	Netizen Popularity Award - Drama	Secret Garden	Won
2010	SBS Drama Awards	Netizen Popularity Award - Actor	Hyun Bin	Won
2010	SBS Drama Awards	Netizen Popularity Award - Actress	Ha Ji-won	Won
2010	SBS Drama Awards	Top 10 Stars	Hyun Bin	Won
2010	SBS Drama Awards	Top 10 Stars	Ha Ji-won	Won
2010	SBS Drama Awards	Best Couple Award	Hyun Bin and Ha Ji-won	Won
2011	47th Baeksang Arts Awards	Grand Prize	Hyun Bin	Won
2011	47th Baeksang Arts Awards	Best Drama	Secret Garden	Won
2011	47th Baeksang Arts Awards	Best Director	Shin Woo-chul	Nominated
2011	47th Baeksang Arts Awards	Best Actor	Hyun Bin	Nominated
2011	47th Baeksang Arts Awards	Best Actress	Ha Ji-won	Nominated
2011	47th Baeksang Arts Awards	Best New Actor	Kim Sung-oh	Nominated
2011	47th Baeksang Arts Awards	Best New Actress	Yoo In-na	Won
2011	47th Baeksang Arts Awards	Best Screenplay	Kim Eun-sook	Won
2011	6th Seoul International Drama Awards	Outstanding Korean Director	Shin Woo-chul	Won
2011	6th Seoul International Drama Awards	Outstanding Korean Actor	Hyun Bin	Nominated
2011	6th Seoul International Drama Awards	Outstanding Korean Actress	Ha Ji-won	Nominated
2011	6th Seoul International Drama Awards	Outstanding Korean Screenwriter	Kim Eun-sook	Won
2011	6th Seoul International Drama Awards	Outstanding Korean Drama OST	"That Woman" - Baek Ji-young	Won
2011	4th Korea Drama Awards	Grand Prize (Daesang)	Secret Garden	Won
2011	4th Korea Drama Awards	Best Director	Shin Woo-chul	Nominated
2011	4th Korea Drama Awards	Best Actress	Ha Ji-won	Nominated
2011	4th Korea Drama Awards	Best Supporting Actor	Kim Sung-oh	Nominated
2011	4th Korea Drama Awards	Best Supporting Actress	Park Joon-geum	Nominated
2011	4th Korea Drama Awards	Best Supporting Actress	Yoo In-na	Nominated
2011	4th Korea Drama Awards	Best Writer	Kim Eun-sook	Won
2011	13th Mnet Asian Music Awards	Best OST	"That Woman" - Baek Ji-young	Won
2011	24th Grimae Awards	Grand Prize (Daesang)	Heo Dae-sun, Lee Seung-chun (camera directors)	Won
2011	24th Grimae Awards	Best Actress	Ha Ji-won	Won
2011	24th Grimae Awards	Best Lighting Director	Park Man-chang	Won
2011	Korea Content Awards	Prime Minister's Award in the Field of Broadcasting	Kim Eun-sook	Won

== Remakes ==
In 2011, BigBang made a parody based on this drama with the title Secret Big Bang, starring G-Dragon as Gil Ra-im and T.O.P as Kim Joo-tap.

In China, a film remake with the same title was released in 2012 starring Wallace Chung, Tan Weiwei and Korean singer Kangta.

In Thailand, a remake with the title Secret Garden Thailand was released in 2016 starring Ananda Everingham and Pimchanok Luevisadpaibul.
