= Beyond That Mountain =

2020 South Korean biopic film

- Theatrical release poster
- Hangul: 저 산 너머
- RR: Jeo san neomeo
- MR: Chŏ san nŏmŏ
- Directed by: Choi Jong-tae
- Written by: Choi Jong-tae
- Based on: Beyond That Mountain by Jung Chae-bong
- Produced by: Lee Sung-ho
- Starring: Lee Kyung-hoon; Lee Hang-na; Ahn Nae-sang; Kang Shin-il
- Cinematography: Kim Byung-jung
- Edited by: Yi Yoon-hwi
- Music by: Kim Joon-sung; Kim Bo-hyun
- Production company: Leon Pictures
- Distributed by: Little Big Pictures
- Release date: April 30, 2020
- Running time: 112 minutes
- Country: South Korea
- Language: Korean
- Box office: $588,909

Beyond That Mountain (Korean: 저 산 너머; RR: Jeo san neomeo) is a 2020 South Korean biographical film written and directed by Choi Jong-tae, starring Lee Kyung-hoon, Lee Hang-na, Ahn Nae-sang and Kang Shin-il. Based on the novel of the same name by Jung Chae-bong, it was released on April 30, 2020 on Buddha's Day.

== Plot ==
Set in 1928, this film is about the childhood of Stephen Kim Sou-hwan, former Cardinal of the Roman Catholic Church and Archbishop of Seoul. He was an iconic figure in South Korea's bloody and tumultuous transition from military rule to democracy, and was widely respected across all sections in South Korean society.

== Cast ==
- Lee Kyung-hoon as Stephen Kim Sou-hwan
- Lee Hang-na as Seo Jung-hwa
- Ahn Nae-sang as Kim Young-seok
- Kang Shin-il as Father Yoon
- Song Chang-eui as Kim Ik-hyun
- Lee Yul-eum as Kang Mal-son
- Jung Sang-hyun as Dong-han
- Lee Seul-bi as Sun-ja
- Kim Dong-hwa as Jin-goo
- Im Han-bin as Man-gil
- Baek Seung-ho as Yong-sik
- Yoon Seok-ho as Bong-pal
- Kim Young-jae as Kim Dae-geon
- Woo Hyun as Pottery shop owner
- Kim Gi-cheon as Ginseng shop owner

== Production ==
Child actor Lee Kyung-hoon was chosen among 260 candidates to portray Stephen Kim Sou-hwan.
