= How Should I Be =

- Also known as: 정 What in the world is happening
- Genre: Drama
- Starring: Kim Suk-hoon; Yoo Jun-sang; Kim Ji -ho Kim Sa-rang
- Country of origin: South Korea
- No. of episodes: 24

Production
- Running time: 65 minutes

Original release
- Network: SBS
- Release: 28 August – 13 November 2002

How Should I Be (Korean: 정; RR: Jeong) is a South Korean television series that was aired on SBS in 2002.

== Crew ==
- Teleplay: Jang Young-chul, Jeong Gyeong-sun
- Director: Jeong Se-ho

== Characters ==
- Kim Suk-hoon: The withdrawal
- Yoo Jun-sang: Byeongsu
- Kim Ji-ho: Unburned
- Kim Sa-rang: Eulsuk
- Youn Yuh-jung: Eomssi
- Park Geun-hyung: Taebong
- Im Ye-jin: User
- Han Chae-young: Hamish
- Kil Yong-woo: Dr. Tak
- Yang Jung-a: Line
- Choi Joon-yong: Due south
- Yun Gi-won: Acting
- Ryu Su-young: Ashes
- Jang Ho-jun
