= My Fair Lady (2009 TV series) =

South Korean television series

- Promotional poster
- Also known as: Take Care of the Young Lady; Take Care of Agasshi; Lady Castle
- Hangul: 아가씨를 부탁해
- Hanja: 아가씨를 付託해
- RR: Agassireul butakhae
- MR: Agassirŭl put'akhae
- Genre: Romance; Comedy
- Written by: Kim Eun-hee; Yoon Eun-kyung
- Directed by: Ji Young-soo
- Starring: Yoon Eun-hye; Yoon Sang-hyun; Jung Il-woo; Moon Chae-won
- Opening theme: "Hot Stuff" by Davichi
- Ending theme: "Hot Stuff" by Davichi
- Country of origin: South Korea
- Original language: Korean
- No. of episodes: 16

Production
- Executive producer: Han Joon-seo
- Producer: Lee So-yeon
- Camera setup: Multi-camera setup
- Running time: 60 minutes Wednesdays and Thursdays at 21:55 (KST)
- Production company: Victory Production

Original release
- Network: Korean Broadcasting System
- Release: 19 August – 8 October 2009

Related
- My Fair Lady (Philippines)

My Fair Lady (Korean: 아가씨를 부탁해; lit. 'Take Care of the Young Lady') is a 2009 South Korean television series, starring Yoon Eun-hye, Yoon Sang-hyun, Jung Il-woo and Moon Chae-won. It aired on KBS2 from August 19 to October 8, 2009, on Wednesdays and Thursdays at 21:55 for 16 episodes.

== Plot ==
Kang Hye-na, the only successor of Kang-san Group, is the owner of the 'Lady Castle' and lives a 'princess-like' life with her servants. Hye-na's parents died from a plane accident and her grandfather brought her up. Hye-na is strong-headed and selfish, whose world revolves around her because she could not experience the warmth of a family whilst growing up. One day, she comes across Dong-chan when she is carelessly driving and knocks into Dong-chan's truck in which he is shipping flowers. She knocks out a bunch of flowers from his truck so Dong-chan goes to complain. She refuses to apologise but just gives him money. She drives away although Dong-chan isn't satisfied. He chases after her and eventually cuts her off at the end of a road. Kang Hye-na ignores this and just drives straight into his truck. As a consequence of this he makes Hye-na do community service, kidnaps her, and appears in front of her as the new household manager. Hye-na makes every effort to throw him out from the Castle, but Dong-chan refuses to budge.

== Cast ==
- Yoon Eun-hye as Kang Hye-na

She is the owner of Lady Castle, and lost her parents in a plane crash. Even then, she lived a princess-like life with her servants but she had a lonely upbringing, living under the care of her stern grandfather. This resulted to her overtly indifferent and oblivious-to-others character. She has grown-up into a self-centered woman that every time she opens her mouth, she would blurt out blunt remarks no matter who the person is. She's skilled in horse riding, fencing, and clay shooting; the only reason is to either humiliate men unworthy of her, or to add awkwardness to conversations. One day, she came across Seo Dong-chan, a gigolo who turns her life upside down. She feels uneasy over the fact that she may have finally met her match.

- Yoon Sang-hyun as Seo Dong-chan

A former gigolo who gave up his schooling in the university and his first love just to make money for the operation of his mother who has leukemia. Dong-chan has good looks, eloquent speech, and can easily adapt to circumstances, thus making him the best gigolo. Soon after his mother died, he stopped his booming career. At the moment, he's paying off a five thousand debt from the charges from his mother's operations. One day, a woman named Kang Hye-na who is notorious for being arrogant and spoiled shows up and stimulated his competitive spirit. Dong-chan makes up his mind to enter the Castle and becomes her butler, thereby changing his whole life.

- Jung Il-woo as Lee Tae-yoon

An elite lawyer who came from a very wealthy family. He is devoting his life to legal service for the poor in a shabby lawyer's office. He may look like a soft and gentle young man, but when it comes to his work he is merciless and sharp like a knife. He reminds Hye-na of her first love which is why she was attracted to him.

- Moon Chae-won as Yeo Eui-joo

A bright and cheerful girl who dreams of becoming a shoe designer. She grew up with Dong-chan and is close to him. She constantly encourages him to take the right path, worrying about him and supporting him to get his life back on track. Behind Eui-joo's concern, is her unrequited love for Dong-chan.

- Wang Seok-hyeon as Kang Su-min
- Kim Young-kwang as Jung Woo-sung
- Lee Jung-gil as Chairman Kang
- Kim Myeong-gook as Representative Kang

Hye-na's uncle (her father's younger brother), and managing director of Kang-San Group. He schemes to make the company his own.

- Jo Hyun-kyu as Jang Dong-gun
- Shin Ki-hyun as Lee Byung-hun
- Song Joong-ki as butler (cameo)

== Original soundtrack ==
1. Hot Stuff - Davichi
2. Can't Stop Love / Helpless Love - Yoon Sang-hyun
3. Dash Girl - Yoon Eun-hye
4. I Give / Take Care of the Heart - Jung Jae-wook
5. Give My Love / Take Care of the Lady - Na Yoon-kwon
6. Lady (스윙)
7. The Story (숨겨진 이야기)
8. Take Care Girl (Tango) (아가씨를 부탁해 (탱고))
9. Hot Stuff (inst)
10. Can't Stop Love / Helpless Love (inst)
11. Dash Girl (inst)
12. I Give / Take Care of the Heart (inst)
13. Give My Love / Take Care of the Lady (inst)

Bonus Track:

1. I Love You - Miryo feat. Narsha
2. 로망스 (Romance) - Yoon Eun-hye and Yoon Sang-hyun

== Ratings ==
Date	Episode	Nationwide	Seoul
2009-08-19	1	17.4% (2nd)	17.7% (3rd)
2009-08-20	2	16.3% (6th)	16.7% (4th)
2009-08-26	3	16.4% (4th)	16.9% (5th)
2009-08-27	4	17.4% (3rd)	17.9% (2nd)
2009-09-02	5	14.9% (6th)	14.5% (6th)
2009-09-03	6	15.1% (7th)	14.7% (7th)
2009-09-09	7	14.4% (6th)	14.6% (6th)
2009-09-10	8	14.6% (7th)	14.7% (7th)
2009-09-16	9	13.8% (6th)	14.1% (6th)
2009-09-17	10	14.3% (8th)	14.5% (6th)
2009-09-23	11	13.6% (6th)	14.1% (6th)
2009-09-24	12	15.0% (5th)	15.2% (5th)
2009-09-30	13	14.8% (5th)	15.2% (5th)
2009-10-01	14	14.1% (7th)	14.5% (6th)
2009-10-07	15	16.1% (4th)	16.3% (5th)
2009-10-08	16	19.0% (2nd)	19.4% (1st)
Average		15.5%	15.7%

Source: TNS Media Korea

== Accolades ==
Year	Award	Category	Recipient	Result
2009	KBS Drama Awards	Excellence Award, Actor in a Miniseries	Yoon Sang-hyun	Nominated
2009	KBS Drama Awards	Excellence Award, Actress in a Miniseries	Yoon Eun-hye	Nominated
2009	KBS Drama Awards	Best New Actor	Jung Il-woo	Nominated
2009	KBS Drama Awards	Best New Actress	Moon Chae-won	Nominated
2009	KBS Drama Awards	Best Young Actor	Wang Seok-hyeon	Nominated
2009	KBS Drama Awards	Popularity Award, Actor	Yoon Sang-hyun	Won
2009	KBS Drama Awards	Popularity Award, Actress	Yoon Eun-hye	Won
2009	KBS Drama Awards	Best Couple Award	Yoon Sang-hyun and Yoon Eun-hye	Won

== Remake ==
A Philippine remake of the series premiered on TV5 on September 14, 2015, starring Jasmine Curtis-Smith, Vin Abrenica and Luis Alandy in the leading roles.
