= Love Impossible =

2003 film by Jeong Cho-sin

- Hangul: 남남북녀
- Hanja: 南男北女
- RR: Namnambungnyeo
- MR: Namnambungnyŏ
- Directed by: Jung Cho-shin
- Written by: Jin Han; Jung Cho-shin; Lee Shin-ho
- Produced by: Lee Joon-ik
- Starring: Kim Sa-rang; Zo In-sung
- Cinematography: Jeong Cho-shin
- Edited by: Park Gok-ji; Jeong Jin-hee
- Music by: Park Jung-won
- Production company: Tube Entertainment
- Distributed by: Tube Entertainment
- Release date: August 8, 2003
- Running time: 108 minutes
- Country: South Korea
- Language: Korean

Love Impossible (Korean: 남남북녀; RR: Namnambungnyeo; lit. 'South Man, North Woman'), also translated Love of South and North, is a 2003 South Korean romantic comedy, starring Kim Sa-rang, Zo In-sung and directed by Jung Cho-shin.

== Cast ==
- Kim Sa-rang as Oh Young-hee
- Zo In-sung as Kim Chul-soo
- Heo Young-ran as Seo Hye-young
- Hwangbo as Hye-mi
- Jung Seung-kyo as Jo Ho-chul
- Jo Hye-ryun as Night blue marine
- Lee Hang-na as Professor Yeon Byeon-dae
- Kim Yong-gun
- Jung Ji-soon
- Bae Jang-su
- Cha Yeong-ok
- Lee Sang-hyeok
