= Ms. Perfect =

2017 South Korean television series

- Genre: Mystery; Comedy
- Written by: Hong Seok-ku
- Directed by: Yoon Kyung-ah
- Starring: Ko So-young; Yoon Sang-hyun; Cho Yeo-jeong; Sung Joon
- Country of origin: South Korea
- Original language: Korean
- No. of episodes: 20

Production
- Executive producers: Lee Gun-jun; Lee Jae-gil
- Producers: Jun Jae-yeon; Choi Jun-ho
- Running time: 60 minutes
- Production companies: Ms. Perfect SPC; KBS Media

Original release
- Network: KBS2
- Release: February 27 – May 2, 2017

Ms. Perfect (Korean: 완벽한 아내; RR: Wanbyeokhan anae; lit. 'Perfect Wife') is a South Korean television series starring Ko So-young, Yoon Sang-hyun, Cho Yeo-jeong and Sung Joon. It premiered on February 27, 2017 on KBS2, and aired every Monday and Tuesday at 22:00 (KST).

== Synopsis ==
This is the story of Shim Jae-bok, a middle-aged married woman who gets involved in the mysterious death of Jung Na-mi. Mysteries start to unfold in the life of Jae-bok, and she rediscovers love in another person.

== Cast ==
=== Main ===
- Ko So-young as Shim Jae-bok
- Yoon Sang-hyun as Goo Jung-hee
- Cho Yeo-jeong as Lee Eun-hee / Moon Eun-kyung
  - Kim Soo-min as Lee Eun-hee (young)
- Sung Joon as Kang Bong-goo

=== People around Shim Jae-bok ===
- Kim Jung-nan as Na Hye-ran
- Jung Soo-young as Kim Won-jae

=== People around Goo Jung-hee ===
- Im Se-mi as Jung Na-mi
- Kim Kyu-chul as Jo Young-bae
- Lee Yong-yi as Goo Jung-hee's mother

=== People around Lee Eun-hee ===
- Nam Gi-ae as Choi Duk-boon / Moon Hyung-sun

=== People around Kang Bong-goo ===
- In Gyo-jin as Hong Sam-gyu

=== Others ===
- Jeon Se-hyun as Heo Moon-sook
- Park Joon-myun as Yang Soon-bong
- Heo Eun-jung as Son Yoo-kyung
- Choi Kwon-soo as Goo Jin-wook
- Lee Ji-won as Chae Ri
- Kim Bo-min as Goo Hye-wook
- Lee Jae-wook as Doctor
- Cha Hak-yeon as Brian Lee
  - Shin Jae-won as Brian Lee (young)
- Uhm Ji-man as Detective
- Kang Doo as Boss Ha
- Lee Min-sung as Jack
- Park Woong-bi as Jessy
- Jeon Heon-tae as Manager
- Jang Gyu-ri as Student
- Lee Yu-ri as Lee Jung-soon/Lee Yu-ri

== Production ==
- First script reading took place on January 10, 2017 at the KBS Annex Building in Yeouido, Seoul.
- This is Ko So-young's comeback after 10 years.
- This drama serves as a reunion for both Yoon Sang-hyun and Im Se-mi, who first worked together in the drama Shopping King Louis.

== Ratings ==
In this table, the blue numbers represent the lowest ratings and the red numbers represent the highest ratings.

Ep.	Original broadcast date	Average audience share			
Ep.	Original broadcast date	TNmS		AGB Nielsen	
Ep.	Original broadcast date	Nationwide	Seoul	Nationwide	Seoul
1	February 27, 2017	3.0%	3.6%	3.9%	4.5%
2	February 28, 2017	3.8%	4.5%	4.9%	5.6%
3	March 6, 2017	4.1%	4.9%	5.1%	6.0%
4	March 7, 2017	3.4%	4.1%	4.9%	5.6%
5	March 13, 2017	3.8%	4.2%	3.5%	3.8%
6	March 14, 2017	3.7%	4.0%	4.7%	5.1%
7	March 20, 2017	2.7%	2.8%	3.5%	3.6%
8	March 21, 2017	2.7%	3.0%	4.4%	4.7%
9	March 27, 2017	4.1%	4.2%	6.4%	6.5%
10	March 28, 2017	4.3%	4.8%	6.1%	6.6%
11	April 3, 2017	3.8%	4.7%	5.3%	6.3%
12	April 4, 2017	4.7%	4.9%	5.6%	5.8%
13	April 10, 2017	4.6%	4.9%	4.8%	5.1%
14	April 11, 2017	4.7%	5.1%	5.4%	5.8%
15	April 17, 2017	4.6%	5.4%	5.0%	5.8%
16	April 18, 2017	5.2%	5.5%	5.7%	6.0%
17	April 24, 2017	4.8%	5.1%	4.8%	5.2%
18	April 25, 2017	4.7%	4.9%	4.9%	5.1%
19	May 1, 2017	5.1%	5.6%	4.9%	5.4%
20	May 2, 2017	6.5%	6.7%	6.1%	5.9%
Average		4.2%	4.7%	5.0%	5.4%

== Original soundtrack ==
Ms. Perfect OST Album

Soundtrack album
- Recorded: May 9, 2017 (digital); May 16, 2017 (CD)
- Genre: Soundtrack
- Language: Korean, English
- Label: Star&Tree/LOEN
- Producer: Kim Young-ho (executive)

=== Part 1 ===
No.	Title	Artist	Length
1.	"I Am What I Am" (난 나니까)	Youjeen (Cherry Filter)	04:03
2.	"I Am What I Am" (난 나니까) (Inst.)		04:03
Total length:			08:06

=== Part 2 ===
No.	Title	Artist	Length
1.	"Dangerous"	Hyoseong (Secret)	03:03
2.	"Dangerous" (Inst.)		03:03
Total length:			06:06

=== Part 3 ===
No.	Title	Artist	Length
1.	"It Is Raining" (비가와)	Ahn Hyun-jung	03:32
2.	"It Is Raining" (Inst.)		03:32
Total length:			07:04

=== Part 4 ===
No.	Title	Artist	Length
1.	"I Miss You"	MIIII	04:01
2.	"I Miss You" (Inst.)		04:01
Total length:			08:02

=== Part 5 ===
No.	Title	Artist	Length
1.	"Don't Know"	Shin Jae	03:25
2.	"Don't Know" (Inst.)		03:25
Total length:			06:50

=== Part 6 ===
No.	Title	Artist	Length
1.	"Behind You"	Lee Sang-gon (Noel)	03:57
2.	"Behind You" (Inst.)		03:56
Total length:			07:53

=== Part 7 ===
No.	Title	Artist	Length
1.	"I'm Okay" (괜찮아 난)	Kil Gun	04:14
2.	"I'm Okay" (Inst.)		04:14
Total length:			08:28

=== Part 8 ===
No.	Title	Artist	Length
1.	"As Time Goes By" (시간이 지나면)	Anoc	04:02
2.	"As Time Goes By" (Inst.)		04:00
Total length:			08:02

== International broadcast ==
- Vietnam: HTV2

== Awards and nominations ==
Year	Award	Category	Nominee	Result
2017	31st KBS Drama Awards	Excellence Award, Actor in a Mid-length Drama	Yoon Sang-hyun	Nominated
2017	31st KBS Drama Awards	Excellence Award, Actress in a Mid-length Drama	Cho Yeo-jeong	Won
2017	31st KBS Drama Awards	Excellence Award, Actress in a Mid-length Drama	Ko So-young	Nominated
2017	31st KBS Drama Awards	Best Supporting Actor	In Gyo-jin	Nominated
