= Hold Me Tight (TV series) =

2018 South Korean TV series

- Promotional poster
- Hangul: 손 꼭 잡고, 지는 석양을 바라보자
- Lit.: Let's Hold Hands Tightly and Watch the Sunset
- RR: Son kkok japgo, jineun seogyangeul baraboja
- MR: Son kkok chapko, chinŭn sŏgyangŭl paraboja
- Genre: Romance; Melodrama
- Written by: Jung Ha-yeon
- Directed by: Jung Ji-in
- Starring: Han Hye-jin; Yoon Sang-hyun; Yoo In-young; Kim Tae-hoon
- Country of origin: South Korea
- Original language: Korean
- No. of episodes: 32 (Note: In order to circumvent Korean laws that prevent commercial breaks in the middle of an episode, what would previously have been aired as single 70 minute episodes are now being repackaged as two 35 minute episodes, with two episodes being shown each night with a commercial break between the two.)

Production
- Executive producers: Kim Mi-na; Lim Sung-gyun
- Camera setup: Single-camera
- Running time: 35 minutes
- Production companies: Number Three Pictures; SAYON Media

Original release
- Network: MBC TV
- Release: March 21 – May 10, 2018

Hold Me Tight (Korean: 손 꼭 잡고, 지는 석양을 바라보자) is a South Korean television series starring Han Hye-jin, Yoon Sang-hyun, Yoo In-young and Kim Tae-hoon. The series marks Han Hye-jin's first lead role in four years. It aired on MBC TV from March 21 to May 10, 2018, every Wednesday and Thursday at 21:55 (KST).

== Synopsis ==
The story of a married couple who spent half their lives as partners. They look back on the time they have spent together and rediscover themselves as they suddenly have to confront death.

== Cast ==
=== Main ===
- Han Hye-jin as Nam Hyun-joo, Do-young's wife who has sacrificed everything to support her husband, her longtime lover since college.
- Yoon Sang-hyun as Kim Do-young, Hyun-joo's husband who is a genius architect.
- Yoo In-young as Shin Da-hye, Do-young's first love.
- Kim Tae-hoon as Seok-jun, a prestigious doctor.

=== Supporting ===
- Lee Na-yoon as Kim Saet-byeol, Hyun-joo and Do-young's daughter.
- Lee Mi-do as Yoon Hong-sook
- Han Kyu-won as Bae Hee-joon
- Kim Soo-kyung as Yang Mi-young
- Sung Ryung as Kim Eun-mi
- Kong Jung-hwan as Park Young-geun
- Heo Tae-hee as Choi Joon
- Jang Yong as Nam Jin-tae

=== Special appearance ===
- Jason Scott Nelson as Jason, a party-goer. (Ep. 23)

== Production ==
The first script reading of the cast was held on January 28, 2018 at MBC Station in Sangam-dong.

== Original soundtrack ==
Hold Me Tight OST

Soundtrack album by Various artists
- Genre: Soundtrack
- Language: Korean
- Labels: Blending Co., Ltd.

=== Part 1 ===
Released on March 29, 2018
No.	Title	Artist	Length
1.	"If You"	The Ade	3:40
2.	"If You" (Inst.)		3:40
Total length:			7:20

=== Part 2 ===
Released on April 5, 2018
No.	Title	Artist	Length
1.	"Fatigue" (몸살)	Park Shi-hwan	4:06
2.	"Fatigue" (Inst.)		4:06
Total length:			8:12

=== Part 3 ===
Released on April 12, 2018
No.	Title	Artist	Length
1.	"Like at the First Time" (처음 그때처럼)	Cheon Dan-bi	3:35
2.	"Like at the First Time" (Inst.)		3:35
Total length:			7:10

=== Part 4 ===
Released on April 18, 2018
No.	Title	Artist	Length
1.	"When Morning Begins" (아침이 밝아오면)	Ravie Nuage	4:32
2.	"When Morning Begins" (Inst.)		4:32
Total length:			9:04

=== Part 5 ===
Released on April 26, 2018
No.	Title	Artist	Length
1.	"When Morning Begins Part.2" (아침이 밝아오면 Part.2)	Ju Yoon-ha	4:27
2.	"When Morning Begins Part.2" (Inst.)		4:27
Total length:			8:54

=== Part 6 ===
Released on May 3, 2018
No.	Title	Artist	Length
1.	"Here I Am"	Lee Si-eun	4:06
2.	"Here I Am" (Inst.)		4:06
Total length:			8:12

== Ratings ==
Ep.	Original broadcast date	Average audience share			
Ep.	Original broadcast date	TNmS		Nielsen Korea	
Ep.	Original broadcast date	Nationwide	Seoul	Nationwide	Seoul
1	March 21, 2018	3.3%	4.3%	2.1%	3.6%
2	March 21, 2018	4.1%	3.4%	3.4%	2.2%
3	March 22, 2018	2.9%	3.0%	2.7%	2.8%
4	March 22, 2018	3.3%	3.5%	3.0%	3.1%
5	March 28, 2018	3.2%	3.4%	2.7%	2.9%
6	March 28, 2018	3.9%	4.1%	3.3%	3.5%
7	March 29, 2018	3.9%	4.2%	3.3%	3.6%
8	March 29, 2018	4.6%	4.9%	4.1%	4.4%
9	April 4, 2018	3.6%	3.8%	3.4%	3.7%
10	April 4, 2018	4.0%	4.3%	4.2%	4.6%
11	April 5, 2018	3.9%	4.2%	3.8%	4.1%
12	April 5, 2018	4.2%	4.6%	4.2%	4.7%
13	April 11, 2018	3.6%	3.9%	2.9%	3.2%
14	April 11, 2018	4.4%	4.6%	3.7%	3.9%
15	April 12, 2018	3.6%	4.0%	3.4%	3.7%
16	April 12, 2018	4.5%	4.7%	4.2%	4.3%
17	April 18, 2018	3.8%	4.1%	3.2%	3.4%
18	April 18, 2018	4.5%	4.6%	4.0%	4.2%
19	April 19, 2018	4.4%	4.6%	3.5%	3.7%
20	April 19, 2018	5.1%	5.4%	4.5%	4.9%
21	April 25, 2018	3.3%	3.5%	3.2%	3.4%
22	April 25, 2018	3.4%	3.7%	3.6%	3.8%
23	April 26, 2018	3.4%	3.5%	3.2%	3.3%
24	April 26, 2018	3.4%	3.6%	3.3%	3.5%
25	May 2, 2018	2.4%	2.7%	2.8%	3.0%
26	May 2, 2018	2.9%	3.1%	3.6%	3.8%
27	May 3, 2018	3.4%	3.7%	3.2%	3.5%
28	May 3, 2018	3.6%	3.8%	3.4%	3.6%
29	May 9, 2018	2.9%	3.1%	3.0%	3.2%
30	May 9, 2018	3.8%	3.9%	3.8%	4.0%
31	May 10, 2018	3.2%	3.3%	2.8%	2.9%
32	May 10, 2018	4.2%	4.5%	3.8%	4.1%
Average		3.7%	3.9%	3.4%	3.6%
In the table above, the blue numbers represent the lowest ratings and the red numbers represent the highest ratings.

== Awards and nominations ==
Year	Award	Category	Recipient	Result	Ref.
2018	2018 MBC Drama Awards	Top Excellence Award, Actor in a Wednesday-Thursday Miniseries	Yoon Sang-hyun	Nominated	
2018	2018 MBC Drama Awards	Top Excellence Award, Actor in a Wednesday-Thursday Miniseries	Kim Tae-hoon	Nominated	
2018	2018 MBC Drama Awards	Top Excellence Award, Actress in a Wednesday-Thursday Miniseries	Han Hye-jin	Nominated	
2018	2018 MBC Drama Awards	Best Young Actress	Lee Na-yoon	Won	
