= Man of Men =

2019 film by Hwang Byeong-guk

- Theatrical release poster
- Hangul: 퍼펙트맨
- RR: Peopekteumaen
- MR: P'ŏp'ekt'ŭmaen
- Directed by: Yong Soo
- Written by: Yong Soo
- Produced by: Heo Seong-jin
- Starring: Sul Kyung-gu; Cho Jin-woong; Huh Joon-ho; Jin Seon-kyu; Kim Sa-rang
- Production company: Man Film
- Distributed by: Showbox
- Release date: October 2, 2019
- Running time: 117 minutes
- Country: South Korea
- Language: Korean
- Box office: US$8.9 million

Man of Men (Korean: 퍼펙트맨) is a 2019 South Korean comedy-drama film written and directed by Yong Soo. It stars Sul Kyung-gu, Cho Jin-woong, Huh Joon-ho, Jin Seon-kyu, and Kim Sa-rang. The film was released on October 2, 2019.

== Synopsis ==
Young-gi, a petty gangster dreaming of one big score for a perfect life, embezzles ₩700 million from his gang boss and invests it in stocks, only to be scammed and left with worthless paper. Now desperate to survive, Young-gi must come up with the money by any means. That is when he meets Jang-soo, the prickly head of a law firm.

Diagnosed with only two months to live, Jang-soo proposes a high-stakes deal. He will help Young-gi in exchange for Young-gi carrying out his unfinished business, with Jang-soo's life insurance payout on the line.

== Cast ==
- Sul Kyung-gu as Han Jang-soo
- Cho Jin-woong as Kang Young-gi
- Huh Joon-ho as Beom-do
- Jin Seon-kyu as Dae-guk
- Kim Sa-rang as Eun-ha
- Ji Seung-hyun as Choi Ki-tae
- Kim Min-seok as Kang Jeong-gi
- Park Bo-kyung as Ceramics store employee

== Production ==
Principal photography for Man of Men began in November 2018 and ended in January 2019. The film features a scene set at Sajik Baseball Stadium in Busan.

== Reception ==
=== Box office ===
The film was released on October 2, 2019, on 894 screens. It opened at third place at the South Korean box office with 77,448 admissions.

The film has grossed US$7,476,871 from 1,240,022 admissions.

=== Critical response ===
Yoon Min-sik of The Korea Herald noted that Man of Men "is far too familiar, far too obvious and far too sappy for a movie that came out in 2019", yet found it "pretty fun", largely thanks to the chemistry between its leads. While acknowledging the film's predictable plot and derivative premise, Yoon concluded that it was "fairly enjoyable", despite uneven humor, one-dimensional characters, and a lack of meaningful female roles.
