= A Love to Kill =

South Korean television series

- Promotional poster
- Also known as: Knock Out by Love; This Love I Want to Kill; Detestable Love
- Hangul: 이 죽일 놈의 사랑
- RR: I jugil nomui sarang
- MR: I chugil nomŭi sarang
- Genre: Melodrama; Romance
- Created by: KBS
- Written by: Lee Kyung-hee
- Directed by: Kim Kyu-tae
- Starring: Rain; Shin Min-a; Kim Sa-rang; Lee Ki-woo
- Composer: Choi Seung-kwon
- Country of origin: South Korea
- Original language: Korean
- No. of episodes: 16

Production
- Producer: Jung Sung-hyo (KBS)
- Production company: GROUP EIGHT

Original release
- Network: KBS2
- Release: 31 October – 20 December 2005

A Love to Kill (Korean: 이 죽일 놈의 사랑; RR: I jugil nomui sarang) is a 2005 South Korean television drama series, starring Rain, Shin Min-a, Kim Sa-rang, and Lee Ki-woo. It aired on KBS2 from October 31 to December 20, 2005, on Mondays and Tuesdays at 21:55 for 16 episodes.

== Synopsis ==
Kang Bok-gu (Rain) is a skilled K-1 fighter. However, he has never tried to win a single fight, as he has no desire for the attention that will come with a title. He lives in the same house with Han Da-jung (Kim Sa-rang), who saved him from a fire when they were teenagers. Racked by guilt that she became scarred as a result and knowing her love for him, Bok-gu intends to spend the rest of his life with her, even though he is not in love with her. After years of being estranged from his older brother Kang Min-gu (Kim Young-jae), Bok-gu finally reconciles with him. However, the reunion is short-lived. Min-gu attempts suicide upon learning of the engagement of his ex-girlfriend, Cha Eun-suk (Shin Min-ah).

Eun-suk is an up-and-coming actress. Caught in a compromising position with Kim Joon-sung (Lee Ki-woo), heir to a large conglomerate, she is forced into an engagement with him. As Min-gu lies in a vegetative state, Bok-gu learns of his relationship with Eun-suk. Min-gu had taken care of Eun-suk and her family, often helping them out financially, before Eun-suk became a famous actress. Bok-gu incorrectly assumes that Eun-suk is a social climber who broke up with Min-gu upon achieving success because she thought he would be a burden. Bok-gu blames her for Min-gu's current state and vows revenge.

Bok-gu starts by getting himself hired as Eun-suk's bodyguard. Then using the same method as his brother (as detailed in Min-gu's diary), Bok-gu woos her thereby humiliating and shaming her when made public. Reluctantly, Eun-suk starts to fall for Bok-gu. To complicate matters, Bok-gu finds himself falling for Eun-suk as well. On the day of her engagement, Bok-gu persuades Eun-suk to run away with him, but her family and Joon-sung announce that she has been kidnapped. When Bok-gu is arrested, Eun-suk publicly acknowledges her relationship with him to secure his release, knowing full well that the ensuing scandal will ruin her career.

Bok-gu completes his revenge by revealing to Eun-suk his identity as Min-gu's brother and his plans to ruin her. Eun-suk is devastated not only by this news because societal norms don't allow for romantic relationships with deceased or divorced persons' siblings, but also when she sees Min-gu in his current state. Eun-suk insists on taking over the care of Min-gu despite the protests of Bok-gu, who is saddened by what he has done and does not want Eun-suk to throw her life away caring for an invalid. As Eun-suk stubbornly continues to visit and care for Min-gu, Bok-gu realizes the truth about their relationship. Bok-gu finds out that Min-gu had been the one to leave Eun-suk, fearing he would stand in the way of her success. Eun-suk had been relentlessly and faithfully searching for Min-gu and leaving phone messages for him. Overcome by guilt for what he has done to Eun-suk, Bok-gu moves Min-gu away to prevent Eun-suk from seeing them again.

A year passes and Eun-suk has retired from acting. No longer an actress, her family runs a karaoke center while she holds a regular job. When her car breaks down, she pulls into the auto repair shop where Bok-gu is working and meets him again. He tells her that Min-gu has died. She is grief-stricken but, when Bok-gu drops his cell phone and she happens to pick it up and open it, she sees a recent picture of Min-gu and knows that Bok-gu is lying. She goes to Bok-gu's house and re-unites with Min-gu, who has awoken from his coma and is not able to speak, but clearly recognizes Eun-suk and is overjoyed to see her. Despite Bok-gu's protests, she decides to take Min-gu away to a house outside the city to care for him herself. Bok-gu and Da-jung pay a visit on Min-gu's birthday. It is apparent to everyone there that Bok-gu and Eun-suk love each other. Min-gu also realizes this and tries to drive Eun-suk away by being difficult and throwing fits. He has a health relapse and before he dies he asks Bok-gu to love Eun-suk and take care of her.

Because Bok-gu's guilt won't allow him to be with his brother's former girlfriend, and social scorn prohibits a woman from having a relationship with two brothers even after one dies, Bok-gu and Eun-suk realize their love is doomed, but they agree to forget everything for just one carefree day and night together before parting for good. They promise each other to live well and to succeed in their future careers.

Joon-sung, who had financed Eun-suk's last movie, releases it and she is thrust back into the limelight. She also decides to give Joon-sung a chance. Another year passes. Eun-suk's acting career has taken off again. There is speculation that she will marry Joon-sung. Bok-gu, too, has achieved fame after winning a championship fight and he has saved money to open his own auto shop. He still misses Eun-suk but carries on as promised, content that she is happy.

Then, Eun-suk disappears and Joon-sung goes to Bok-gu seeking help to find her. Concerned, Bok-gu goes to look for Eun-suk at the place they had spent their last day together. Trekking through the snow, Bok-gu finally finds Eun-suk, half-frozen, and miles from shelter. She had tried to keep her promise to succeed in life without him, but was unable to forget her prohibited love for him. Bok-gu tries to carry her to safety, but weighed down by her and hampered by the heavy snow, he has to stop. He hugs her tight to warm her but both eventually succumb to the cold. They are finally reunited in death.

== Cast ==
- Rain as Kang Bok-gu
- Shin Min-a as Cha Eun-suk
- Lee Ki-woo as Kim Joon-sung
- Kim Sa-rang as Han Da-jung
- Kim Young-jae as Kang Min-gu, Bok-gu's brother
  - Joo Min-soo as young Min-gu
- Kim Dae-jin as Park Mi-sook
- Kang Rae-yeon as Choi Mi-seon
- Park In-hwan as Cha Du-yong, Eun-suk's father
- Yoo Hye-ri as Park Ja-kyung, Eun-suk's stepmother
- Lee Min-hyuk as Cha Jae-suk, Eun-suk's younger brother
- Kim Song-hee as Cha Yoo-na, Eun-suk's younger sister
- Yoo Jae-geun as Sung-jin, Eun-suk's road manager
- Ji Sang-ryeol as Tae-choon
- Lim Ju-hwan as Actor role with Eun-suk
- Lee Soon-jae
- Choi Kwon
- Lee Dong-ho
- Park Soo-hyun
- Kim Sung-hoon
- Min Ji-ah

== Ratings ==
In the ratings below, the highest rating for the show will be in red, and the lowest rating for the show will be in blue.

Date	Episode	Nationwide	Seoul
2005-10-31	1	16.4% (3rd)	16.9% (3rd)
2005-11-01	2	14.8% (6th)	15.6% (5th)
2005-11-07	3	16.0% (4th)	15.7% (4th)
2005-11-08	4	15.8% (3rd)	17.9% (2nd)
2005-11-14	5	13.3% (6th)	13.7% (5th)
2005-11-15	6	15.4% (4th)	16.2% (4th)
2005-11-21	7	15.2% (4th)	16.4% (4th)
2005-11-22	8	15.5% (4th)	15.8% (4th)
2005-11-28	9	14.2% (6th)	14.7% (5th)
2005-11-29	10	15.8% (6th)	16.5% (5th)
2005-12-05	11	16.2% (6th)	17.1% (5th)
2005-12-06	12	15.2% (9th)	17.1% (5th)
2005-12-12	13	13.4% (10th)	13.5% (9th)
2005-12-13	14	14.1% (11th)	14.8% (10th)
2005-12-19	15	13.3% (10th)	14.2% (8th)
2005-12-20	16	13.4% (10th)	14.3% (8th)
Average		14.8%	15.6%

Source: TNMS Media Korea

== Awards ==
- 2005 KBS Drama Awards: Netizen Award - Rain
- 2005 KBS Drama Awards: Best Supporting Actress - Kim Sa-rang
- 2006 Baeksang Arts Awards: Best New Director (TV) - Kim Kyu-tae
- 2006 Asian Television Awards: Best Drama Series

== Remakes ==
An Indonesian remake was titled Bodyguard Jatuh Cinta.

In Thailand a remake was titled รักซ่อนแค้น (rạk s̀xn khæ̂n; literally: Love Hidden Revenge) on ONE HD directed by Attaporn Teemakorn beginning July 26, 2017.

A Philippine remake with the same title will premiere on Netflix in 2022.
