= This Is My Love (TV series) =

South Korean television series

- Promotional poster
- Also known as: My Love Eun-dong; Eun-dong, Whom I Love; My Love Donna
- Hangul: 사랑하는 은동아
- RR: Saranghaneun Eundonga
- MR: Saranghanŭn Ŭndonga
- Genre: Romance; Melodrama
- Written by: Baek Mi-kyung
- Directed by: Lee Tae-gon; Kim Jae-hong
- Starring: Joo Jin-mo; Kim Sa-rang
- Composer: Nam Hye-seung
- Country of origin: South Korea
- Original language: Korean
- No. of episodes: 16

Production
- Executive producers: Jo Joon-hyeong; Yoo Byeong-sul; Song Won-seop
- Producer: Park Sang-ok
- Cinematography: Kim Cheon-seok; Park Ji-seon
- Running time: 65 minutes
- Production companies: Drama House; Mong-jak-so Co.

Original release
- Network: JTBC
- Release: May 29 – July 18, 2015

This Is My Love (Korean: 사랑하는 은동아; lit. 'Beloved Eun-dong') is a 2015 South Korean television series starring Joo Jin-mo and Kim Sa-rang. It aired on JTBC from May 29 to July 18, 2015 on Fridays and Saturdays at 20:40 (KST) for 16 episodes.

== Synopsis ==
Top actor Ji Eun-ho (Joo Jin-mo) hires ghostwriter Seo Jung-eun (Kim Sa-rang) to write his autobiography in 2015. Eun-ho is tense, irritable and difficult to work with, but Jung-eun finds her assignment fascinating because Eun-ho claims he began acting not because he wanted to become a star but because he thought being in the limelight would help him find his first love, Ji Eun-dong. Eun-ho and Eun-dong's complicated romantic history has spanned two decades, and he's convinced that he can never love anyone else. As Jung-eun helps him remember Eun-dong and why he lost her, Eun-ho (whose birth name is Park Hyun-soo) looks back on his memories of her, from when they met in 1995 when he was seventeen.

== Cast ==
- Joo Jin-mo as Ji Eun-ho / Park Hyun-soo
  - Park Jin-young as 17-year-old Park Hyun-soo
  - Baek Sung-hyun as 27-year-old Park Hyun-soo
- Kim Sa-rang as Seo Jung-eun / Ji Eun-dong
  - Lee Ja-in as 13-year-old Ji Eun-dong
  - Yoon So-hee as 23-year-old Ji Eun-dong
- Kim Tae-hoon as Choi Jae-ho
  - Na In-woo as 24-year-old Choi Jae-ho
- Kim Yoo-ri as Jo Seo-ryung
- Kim Hyun-joon as Secretary Kim
- Kim Yoon-seo as Park Hyun-ah
- Lee Young-ran as Hyun-soo's mother
- Jung Dong-hwan as Hyun-soo's father
- Nam Kyung-eup as Coach Seo
- Seo Kap-sook as Madam Park
- Joo Min-kyung as Nan-shil
- Park Min-soo as Choi Ra-il
- Shin Rin-ah as Yoo Min-ah (Hyun-ah's daughter)
- Mi-jung as Madam Park
- Kim Yong-hee as Lee Hyun-bal
  - Dong Ha as young Lee Hyun-bal
- Kim Min-ho as Go Dong-gyu
- Kim Mi-jin as Go Mi-soon
- Jang Ki-yong as Lee Suk-tae

== Original soundtrack ==
This Is My Love OST

Soundtrack album by Various artists
- Recorded: 2015
- Genre: Soundtrack
- Languages: Korean; English
- Label: Vitamin Entertainment

=== Part 1 ===
Released on June 5, 2015
No.	Title	Artist	Length
1.	"My Heart is that way" (내맘이그래요)	Kim Tae-hyun (DickPunks)	3:39
2.	"My Heart is that way" (Inst.)		3:39
Total length:			7:38

=== Part 2 ===
Released on June 12, 2015
No.	Title	Artist	Length
1.	"Back in days" (일호에)	Lee Won-suk	4:28
2.	"Back in days" (Inst.)		4:28
Total length:			8:56

=== Part 3 ===
Released on June 13, 2015
No.	Title	Artist	Length
1.	"Seen, Heard" (보인다, 들린다)	Han Hee-jun	3:27
2.	"Seen, Heard" (Inst.)		3:27
Total length:			6:54

=== Part 4 ===
Released on July 3, 2015
No.	Title	Artist	Length
1.	"Neol geurida" (널그리다)	Jang Woo-ram	4:33
2.	"Neol geurida" (Inst.)		4:33
Total length:			7:38

Disc 2:
No.	Title	Artist	Length
1.	"Beloved Eun dong" (Opening Title)	Various Artists	0:56
2.	"A Promise"	Various Artists	2:33
3.	"Cheoeum Neoreul Bon Soongan"	Various Artists	3:10
4.	"Eundongiwa Donghwachaek"	Various Artists	3:14
5.	"Gidarim"	Various Artists	3:11
6.	"Ilheobeorin shiganeul chataseo"	Various Artists	4:01
7.	"Hogishim"	Various Artists	1:58
8.	"Sarangi Shijakdwoida"	Various Artists	3:56
9.	"Soonsoohan Sarang"	Various Artists	3:02
10.	"Sesangeso Gajang Ddaddeuthan"	Various Artists	2:08
11.	"Woondonghwa"	Various Artists	1:59
12.	"Wooseoyo"	Various Artists	1:06

== Awards and nominations ==
Year	Award	Category	Recipient	Result
2015	8th Korea Drama Awards	Excellence Award, Actress	Kim Sa-rang	Nominated
2015	4th APAN Star Awards	Excellence Award, Actress in a Miniseries	Kim Sa-rang	Nominated
