= Kim Sa-rang (actress) =

South Korean actress and model (born 1978)

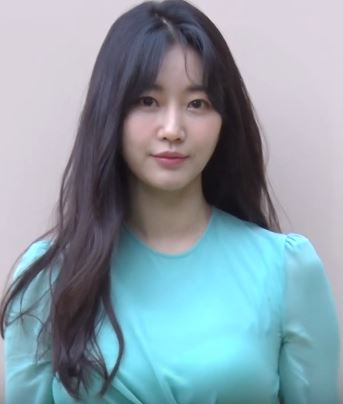
- Kim in April 2019
- Born: January 12, 1978 (age 48); Seoul, South Korea
- Education: Yong In University (BMus, MMus)
- Occupations: Actress; model
- Years active: 2000–present
- Height: 173 cm (5 ft 8 in)
- Beauty pageant titleholder
- Title: Miss Korea 2000
- Major competitions: Miss Universe 2001 (unplaced); Best National Costume (winner)

Korean name
- Hangul: 김사랑
- Hanja: 金莎朗
- RR: Gim Sarang
- MR: Kim Sarang

Kim Sa-rang (Korean: 김사랑; born January 12, 1978) is a South Korean actress, model and beauty pageant titleholder. She is most known for her roles in the television series Secret Garden with Hyun Bin, A Love to Kill with Rain, and This is My Love with Joo Jin-mo. She is also known for being crowned Miss Korea in 2000 and representing South Korea in Miss Universe 2001, the 50th Miss Universe pageant in Puerto Rico. She won 'Best National Costume' Hanbok. In 2015, she became a free agent after leaving Brave Entertainment.

== Early life and education ==
Kim Sa-rang was born on January 12, 1978, in South Korea. She graduated from Gwangyoung Girls' High School. Kim earned both a bachelor's and master's degree in traditional Korean music at Yong In University. She has one younger brother.

== Career ==
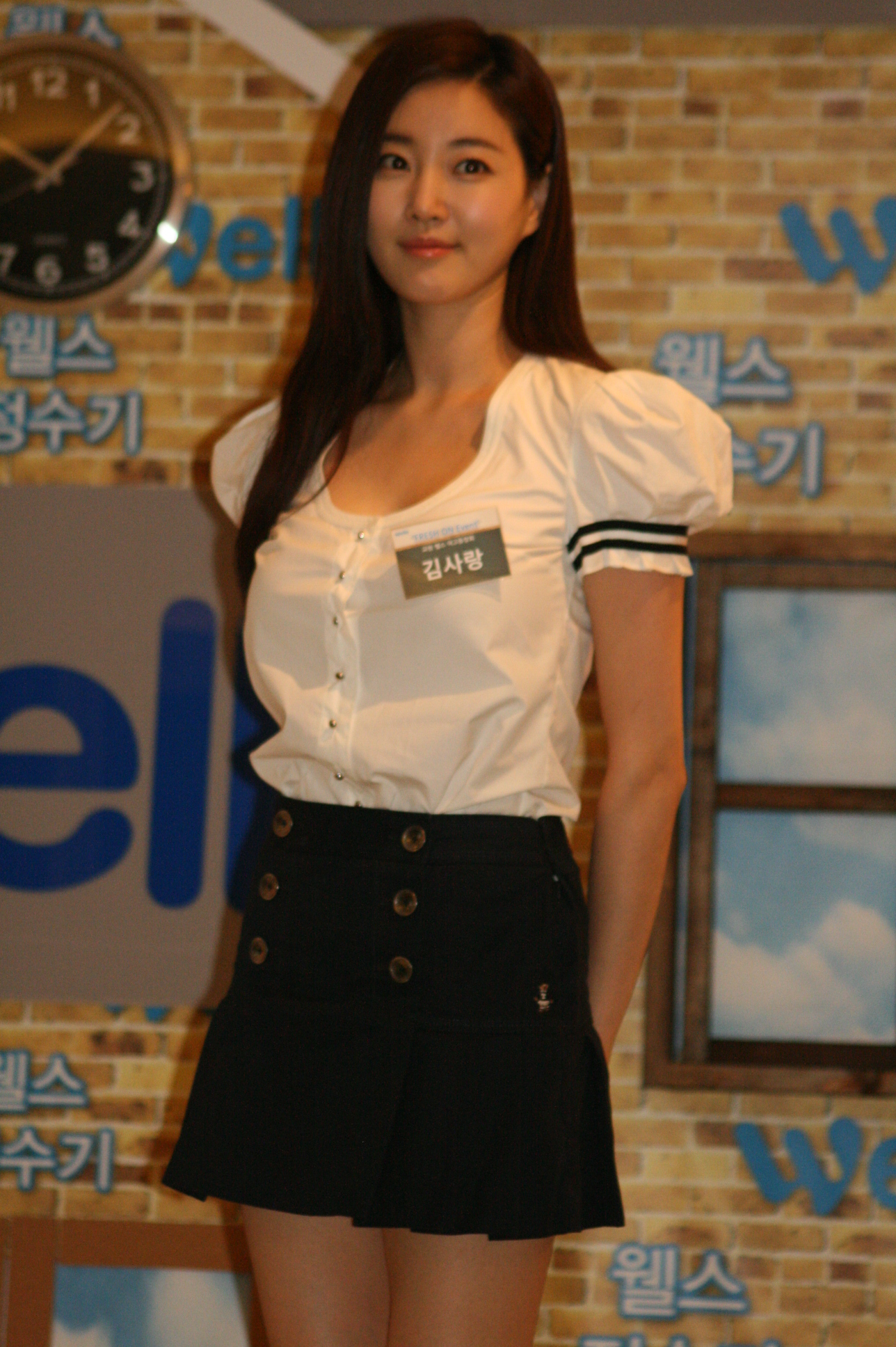
Kim in January 2000

Kim made her acting debut in 2000 in the television drama series Anger of Angel, which garnered positive reviews.

In 2001, she was cast in the television drama series How Should I Be. That same year, she got her first big role in a television drama series entitled Mina which was again met with positive reviews and she was considered a rising star.

In 2003, she appeared in Thousand Years of Love. Her other roles in television include appearances in A Love to Kill, The King and I, Tokyo Sun Shower and Secret Garden. She was last seen in the TV drama series This is My Love.

Kim made her first movie debut in 2002 with Man is Born. Following this, Kim also starred in Love: Impossible, Who Slept with Her? and Radio Dayz.

She has also appeared in several K-pop music videos including "Because You're My Woman" and "Demon".

=== Miss Korea ===
Kim was crowned Miss Korea on May 28, 2000, at the Sejong Cultural Center, the site of the 1980 Miss Universe Pageant. She represented Korea in the Miss Universe Pageant 2001. During the pageant, she won the award for Best National Costume, which was a Korean hanbok dress.

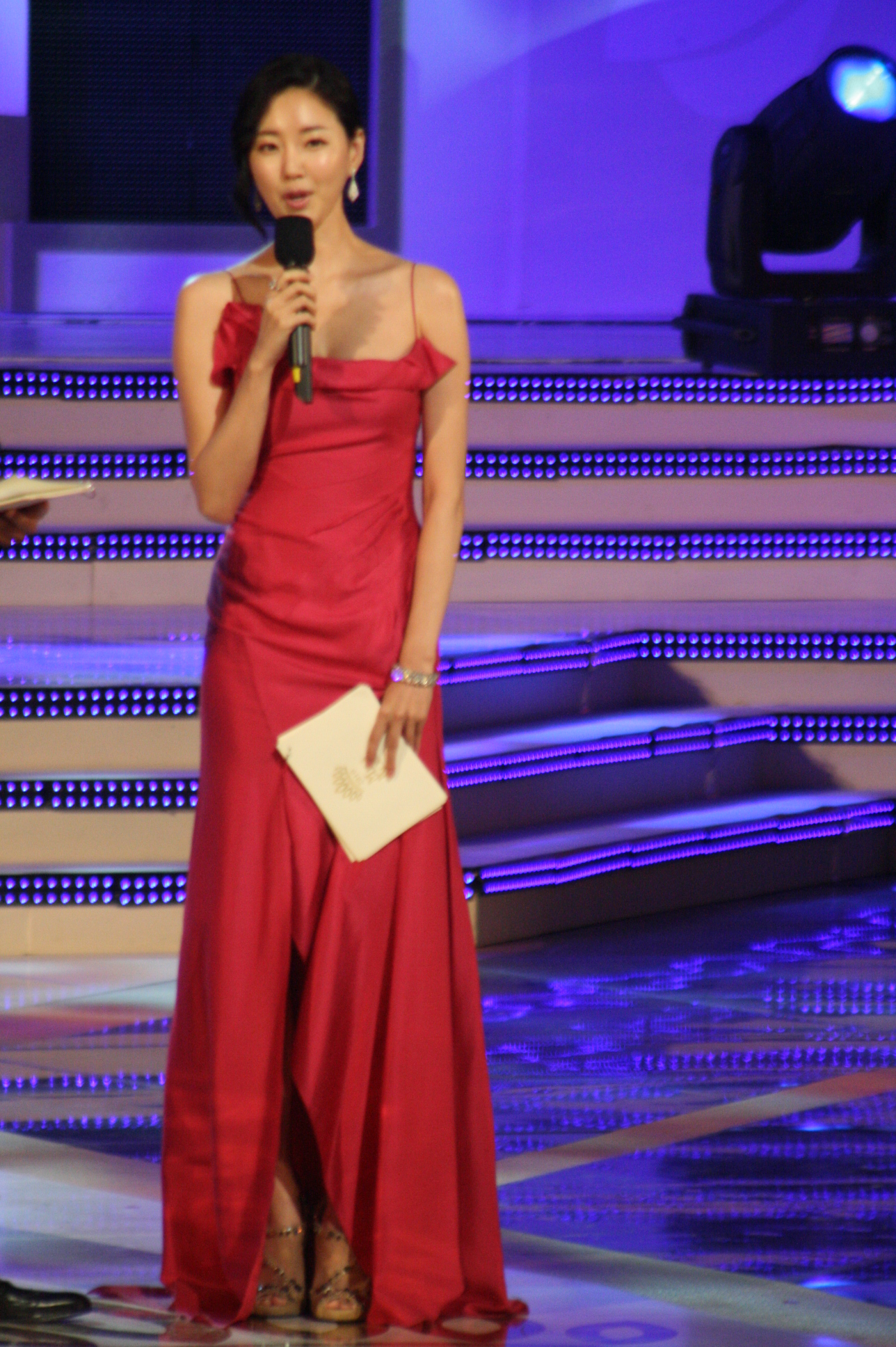
Kim during Miss Korea 2010 as a host

== Filmography ==
=== Film ===
Year	Title	Role
2002	Birth of a Man	Sa-rang
2003	Love Impossible	Oh Yeong‑hee
2006	Hot for Teacher	Uhm Ji-young
2008	Radio Dayz	Marie
2019	Man of Men	Eun-ha

=== Television series ===
Year	Title	Role	Ref.
2000	Anger of Angel		
2001	How Should I Be	Yoo Jin	
2001	Mina	Park Mina (after surgery)	
2001	Lovers	Kim Sa-rang	
2002	Affection	Eul-sook	
2003	A Maiden's Dream	Bogdong	
2003	Thousand Years of Love	Kum-hwa / Go Eun-bi	
2005	A Love to Kill	Han Da-jung	
2007	The King and I	Eoudong [Gisaeng]	
2007	How to Meet a Perfect Neighbor	Herself	
2008	Tokyo Sun Shower	Lee Soo-jin	
2010–2011	Secret Garden	Yoon Seul	
2015	This is My Love	Seo Jung-eun/Ji Eun-dong	
2019	Abyss	Go Se-yeon (cameo, various episodes)	
2020	Get Revenge	Kang Hae-ra	

=== Music video appearances ===
Year	Song title	Artist
1989	"To Lady" (숙녀에게)	Byeon Jin-seop
2004	"Because You're My Woman"	Lee Seung-gi
2011	"Demon"	Jay Park

=== Broadcasting ===
Year	Title
2003, 2006	Shin, Kim Won Hee's Hey Hey Hey
2006	I Asked Ambitious Ten Thousand People
2011	Kim Sa-rang & Lee Tae-im Find Your Taste!
2011	Hope Road

=== Radio ===
Year	Title	Network	Station
2011	Radio Secret Garden	SBS FM	Yunseul Station

=== Hosting ===
Year	Title	Notes
2001	Live Music Camp	
2010	1st Seoul Cultural Arts Awards	

=== Variety show ===
Year	Title	Role
2011	Road of Hope	Charity worker
2017	I Live Alone	Herself

=== Ambassadorship ===
Year	Title
2002	Children Peace Ambassador

== Awards and nominations ==
Year presented, name of the award ceremony, award category, nominated work and the result of the nomination
Year	Award	Category	Nominated work	Result
2000	Miss Korea 2000	Miss Korea	—N/a	Won
2001	Miss Universe Pageant 2001	Best National Costume	Korean Hanbok Dress	Won
2002	Ambassador	Children's Peace Ambassador	—N/a	Won
2005	KBS Drama Awards	Drama Awards Women Tribologists	—N/a	Won
2005	KBS Performance Awards	Best Supporting Actress Award	A Love to Kill	Won
2010	SBS Drama Awards	Best Supporting Actress in a Drama Special	Secret Garden	Nominated
2011	19th Republic of Korea Entertainment News	CF Special Star Award	—N/a	Won
2012	10th Korea Jewelry	Best Jewelry Fair Lady	—N/a	Won
2015	8th Korea Drama Awards	Excellence Award, Actress	This is My Love	Nominated
2015	4th APAN Star Awards	Excellence Award, Actress in a Miniseries	This is My Love	Nominated
