= 2016 KBS Drama Awards =

30th edition of award ceremony

- Date: December 31, 2016
- Hosted by: Jun Hyun-moo; Park Bo-gum; Kim Ji-won
- Official website: 2016 KBS 연기대상

Television coverage
- Network: KBS, KBS World

The 2016 KBS Drama Awards, presented by Korean Broadcasting System (KBS), was held on December 31, 2016, at KBS Hall in Yeouido, Seoul. It was hosted by Jun Hyun-moo, Park Bo-gum and Kim Ji-won.

== Winners and nominees ==
(Winners denoted in bold)

Grand Prize (Daesang)
**Song Hye-kyo** – **Descendants of the Sun**; **Song Joong-ki** – **Descendants of the Sun**
Top Excellence Award, Actor	Top Excellence Award, Actress
**Park Shin-yang** – **My Lawyer, Mr. Jo**; **Park Bo-gum** – **Love in the Moonlight**; Song Il-kook – Jang Yeong-sil; Song Joong-ki – Descendants of the Sun; Ahn Jae-wook – Five Enough; Lee Dong-gun – The Gentlemen of Wolgyesu Tailor Shop; Lee Sang-yoon – On the Way to the Airport; Cha In-pyo – The Gentlemen of Wolgyesu Tailor Shop	**Kim Ha-neul** – **On the Way to the Airport**; Kim Yoo-jung – Love in the Moonlight; Song Hye-kyo – Descendants of the Sun; Bae Suzy – Uncontrollably Fond; So Yoo-jin – Five Enough; Lee Yoo-ri – The Promise; Jo Yoon-hee – The Gentlemen of Wolgyesu Tailor Shop
Excellence Award, Actor in a Miniseries	Excellence Award, Actress in a Miniseries
**Lee Sang-yoon** – **On the Way to the Airport**; Kim Young-kwang – Sweet Stranger and Me; Song Joong-ki – Descendants of the Sun; Oh Ji-ho – My Fair Lady; Jang Hyuk – A Beautiful Mind; Jin Goo – Descendants of the Sun	**Kim Ji-won** – **Descendants of the Sun**; Kim Ha-neul – On the Way to the Airport; Park Jin-hee – My Fair Lady; Song Hye-kyo – Descendants of the Sun; Soo Ae – Sweet Stranger and Me; Jo Bo-ah – Sweet Stranger and Me
Excellence Award, Actor in a Mid-length Drama	Excellence Award, Actress in a Mid-length Drama
**Song Il-gook** – **Jang Yeong-sil**; Kim Woo-bin – Uncontrollably Fond; Park Bo-gum – Love in the Moonlight; Park Shin-yang – My Lawyer, Mr. Jo; Cho Jae-hyun – The Master of Revenge	**Kim Yoo-jung** – **Love in the Moonlight**; Kang So-ra – My Lawyer, Mr. Jo; Bae Suzy – Uncontrollably Fond; Jeong Yu-mi – The Master of Revenge; Chae Soo-bin – Love in the Moonlight
Excellence Award, Actor in a Serial Drama	Excellence Award, Actress in a Serial Drama
**Ahn Jae-wook** – **Five Enough**; **Lee Dong-gun** – **The Gentlemen of Wolgyesu Tailor Shop**; Shim Hyung-tak – Five Enough; Cha In-pyo – The Gentlemen of Wolgyesu Tailor Shop	**So Yoo-jin** – **Five Enough**; **Jo Yoon-hee** – **The Gentlemen of Wolgyesu Tailor Shop**; Oh Hyun-kyung – The Gentlemen of Wolgyesu Tailor Shop; Im Soo-hyang – Five Enough
Excellence Award, Actor in a Daily Drama	Excellence Award, Actress in a Daily Drama
**Oh Min-suk** – **Secrets of Women**; Kim Yu-seok – Sweet Home, Sweet Honey; Kim Jin-woo – The Unusual Family; Song Jong-ho – The Promise; Lee Min-woo – That Sun in the Sky; Jung Hee-tae – My Mind's Flower Rain	**Lee Yoo-ri** – **The Promise**; **So Yi-hyun** – **Secrets of Women**; Park Ha-na – The Promise; Song Ji-eun – Sweet Home, Sweet Honey; Yoon A-jung – That Sun in the Sky; Lee Si-a – The Unusual Family
Best Actor in a One-Act/Special/Short Drama	Best Actress in a One-Act/Special/Short Drama
**Kim Sung-oh** – **Becky's Back**; **Lee Dong-hwi** – **Drama Special – Red Teacher**; Seo Ji-hoon – Drama Special – Legendary Shuttle; Lee Sang-yeob – Drama Special – Home Sweet Home; Lee Ji-hoon – Drama Special – Legendary Shuttle; Ji Soo – Page Turner; Han Joo-wan – Drama Special – Twenty Thousand Won to Pyongyang	**Kang Ye-won** – **Becky's Back**; **Cho Yeo-jeong** – **Babysitter**; Kim So-hyun – Page Turner; Son Yeo-eun – Drama Special – Home Sweet Home; Jeon Hye-bin – Drama Special – Nodle Shop Woman; Jung So-min – Drama Special – Red Teacher
Best Supporting Actor	Best Supporting Actress
**Lee Jun-hyeok** – **Love in the Moonlight**; Kim Kap-soo – My Lawyer, Mr. Jo; In Gyo-jin – Becky's Back; Jo Jae-yoon – Descendants of the Sun; Choi Dae-chul – Love in the Moonlight, Sweet Home, Sweet Honey & Becky's Back; Choi Won-young – The Gentlemen of Wolgyesu Tailor Shop	**Ra Mi-ran** – **The Gentlemen of Wolgyesu Tailor Shop**; Jung Hye-sung – Love in the Moonlight; Seo Jeong-yeon – Descendants of the Sun; Shin Hye-sun – Five Enough; Oh Yoon-ah – My Fair Lady; Hwang Seok-jeong – My Lawyer, Mr. Jo
Best New Actor	Best New Actress
**Sung Hoon** – **Five Enough**; **Jinyoung** – **Love in the Moonlight**; Kwak Dong-yeon – Love in the Moonlight; Kim Min-seok – Descendants of the Sun; Onew – Descendants of the Sun; Ji Soo – Page Turner; Hyun Woo – The Gentlemen of Wolgyesu Tailor Shop	**Kim Ji-won** – **Descendants of the Sun**; **Lee Se-young** – **The Gentlemen of Wolgyesu Tailor Shop**; Kim Yoo-jung – Love in the Moonlight; Gong Seung-yeon – The Master of Revenge; Park So-dam – A Beautiful Mind; Shin Hye-sun – Five Enough
Best Young Actor	Best Young Actress
**Jung Yoon-seok** – **Love in the Moonlight, Five Enough & Jang Yeong-sil**; Go Woo-rim – The Master of Revenge; Baek Su-ho – A Beautiful Mind; Jo Hyun-do – Five Enough; Choi Min-young – The Promise	**Heo Jung-eun** – **Love in the Moonlight, My Fair Lady & My Lawyer, Mr. Jo**; Kim Bo-min – The Promise, Drama Special – Midsummer's Dream; Kim Hwan-hee – On the Way to the Airport; Park Seo-yeon – On the Way to the Airport, The Promise; Jin Ji-hee – Becky's Back
Best Writer	Netizen Award
**Kim Eun-sook** and **Kim Won-seok** – **Descendants of the Sun**	**Park Bo-gum** – **Love in the Moonlight**
Best Couple Award	Special Award: Asia Best Couple
**Song Hye-kyo** & **Song Joong-ki** – Descendants of the Sun; **Park Bo-gum** & **Kim Yoo-jung** – Love in the Moonlight; **Kim Ji-won** & **Jin Goo** – Descendants of the Sun; **Kim Ha-neul** & **Lee Sang-yoon** – On the Way to the Airport; **Heo Jung-eun** & **Oh Ji-ho** – My Fair Lady; **Ra Mi-ran** & **Cha In-pyo** – The Gentlemen of Wolgyesu Tailor Shop; **Lee Se-young** & **Hyun Woo** – The Gentlemen of Wolgyesu Tailor Shop	**Song Hye-kyo** & **Song Joong-ki** – **Descendants of the Sun**

== Presenters ==
Order	Presenter	Award
1	Kim Min-jung	Best Young Actor/Actress
2	Oh Ji-ho, Uhm Hyun-kyung	Best Supporting Actor/Actress
3	Choi Soo-jong, Janice Lee	Special Award: Asia Best Couple
4	Bong Tae-gyu, Lee Ha-na	Best Actor/Actress in a One-Act/Special/Short Drama
5	Mark Lippert, Han Go-eun	Netizen Award
6	Kim Sung-soo, Park Eun-hye	Writer of the Year
7	Song Il-gook, Kim So-hyun	Best New Actor/Actress
8	In Gyo-jin, So Yi-hyun	Best Couple Award
9	Kim Yeong-cheol, Cho Yeo-jeong	Excellence Award in a Serial Drama
10	Han Chae-ah, Kwak Si-yang	Excellence Award in a Daily Drama
11	Park Seo-joon, Park Hyung-sik	Excellence Award in a Miniseries
12	Kim Seung-soo, Myung Se-bin	Excellence Award in a Mid-length Drama
13	Im Dong-jin, Chae Shi-ra	Top Excellence Award
14	Ko Dae-young, Kim Soo-hyun	Grand Prize (Daesang)

== Special performances ==
Order	Artist	Performed
1	Go Doo-shim, Choi Soo-jong	Intro
2	I.O.I	Congratulatory Performance: "Whatta Man" "Pick Me"
3	Gummy	"Moonlight Drawn By Clouds" (구르미 그린 달빛) (Love in the Moonlight OST)
3	Gummy	"You Are My Everything" (Descendants of the Sun OST)
