= Choi Min-yeong =

South Korean actor (born 2002)

- Born: October 9, 2002 (age 24); Seoul, South Korea
- Occupation: Actor
- Years active: 2014–present
- Agent: Saram Entertainment

Korean name
- Hangul: 최민영
- Hanja: 崔民英
- RR: Choe Minyeong
- MR: Ch'oe Minyŏng

Choi Min-yeong (Korean: 최민영; born October 9, 2002) is a South Korean actor. He has appeared in the television series The Promise (2016), Twenty-Five Twenty-One (2022) and Weak Hero Class 2 (2025). Since 2023, he has starred as Dae in the American series XO, Kitty.

== Career ==
Choi Min-yeong made his debut in the KBS2 drama Magic Thousand Characters in 2014. He then appeared in TV series such as JTBC's Strong Girl Bong-soon (2017), tvN's Mr. Sunshine (2018), and JTBC's Itaewon Class (2020). As a musical actor he has appeared in the musicals Bonnie & Clyde, Empress Myeongseong, Frankenstein, and Kinky Boots.

Since April 2022, Choi Min-yeong has had an exclusive contract with artist management company Saram Entertainment. In 2022, he gained recognition in the tvN drama Twenty-Five Twenty-One in the role of Baek Yi-hyun, the younger brother of Baek Yi-jin (Nam Joo-hyuk). That same year, he was cast as Kim "Dae" Dae-heon in the American Netflix television series XO, Kitty, a spin-off of the To All the Boys film series.

== Filmography ==
=== Film ===
Year	Title	Role	Ref.
2014	I Want to Talk to You	Kang Joon-seok	
2023	Dream Palace	Dong-wook	

=== Television series ===
Year	Title	Role	Notes	Ref.
2014	The Magic Thousand-Character Classic	Baby boy		
2016	The Promise	young Kang Tae-joon	Nominated for KBS Drama Awards	
2016	Choco Bank	Young Dal-soo		
2016	Memory	Kim Myung-soo		
2016	Entertainer	Lee Gyeong-soo		
2016	Lucky Romance	Min-jae		
2016	W	Kang Cheol's younger brother	Special appearance	
2017	Strong Girl Bong-soon	young In Guk-doo		
2017	Chicago Typewriter	young Han Se-joo		
2017	Queen for Seven Days	young Seo Noh		
2017	Two Cops	young Tak Jae-hee		
2018	Radio Romance	Woo Ji-woo		
2018	Mr. Sunshine	young Goo Dong-mae		
2018	Your Honor	young Han Soo-ho/Han Gang-ho		
2019	Confession	Yoo Joon-hwan		
2020	Itaewon Class	young Jang Dae-hee		
2021	You Are My Spring	young Chae Joon		
2022	Twenty-Five Twenty-One	Baek Yi-hyun		

=== Web series ===
Year	Title	Role	Notes	Ref.
2023–present	XO, Kitty	Kim Dae-heon	American Netflix series	
2025	Weak Hero	Seo Jun-tae	Season 2	

== Theatre ==
Year	Title	Role	Ref.
2013	Empress Myeongseong - Dageu	Crown prince	
2013	Bonnie and Clyde	Young Clyde	
2014	Frankenstein	Young Frankenstein	
2014	Kinky Boots	Young Charlie	

== Awards and nominations ==
Name of the award ceremony, year presented, category, nominee of the award, and the result of the nomination
Award ceremony	Year	Category	Nominee / Work	Result	Ref.
Blue Dragon Film Awards	2023	Best New Actor	Dream Palace	Nominated	
KBS Drama Awards	2016	Best Young Actor	The Promise	Nominated	
The DIMF Musical Star	2020	Grand Prize (1st place)	Choi Min-yeong	Won	
