= Kim Sung-oh =

South Korean actor (born 1978)

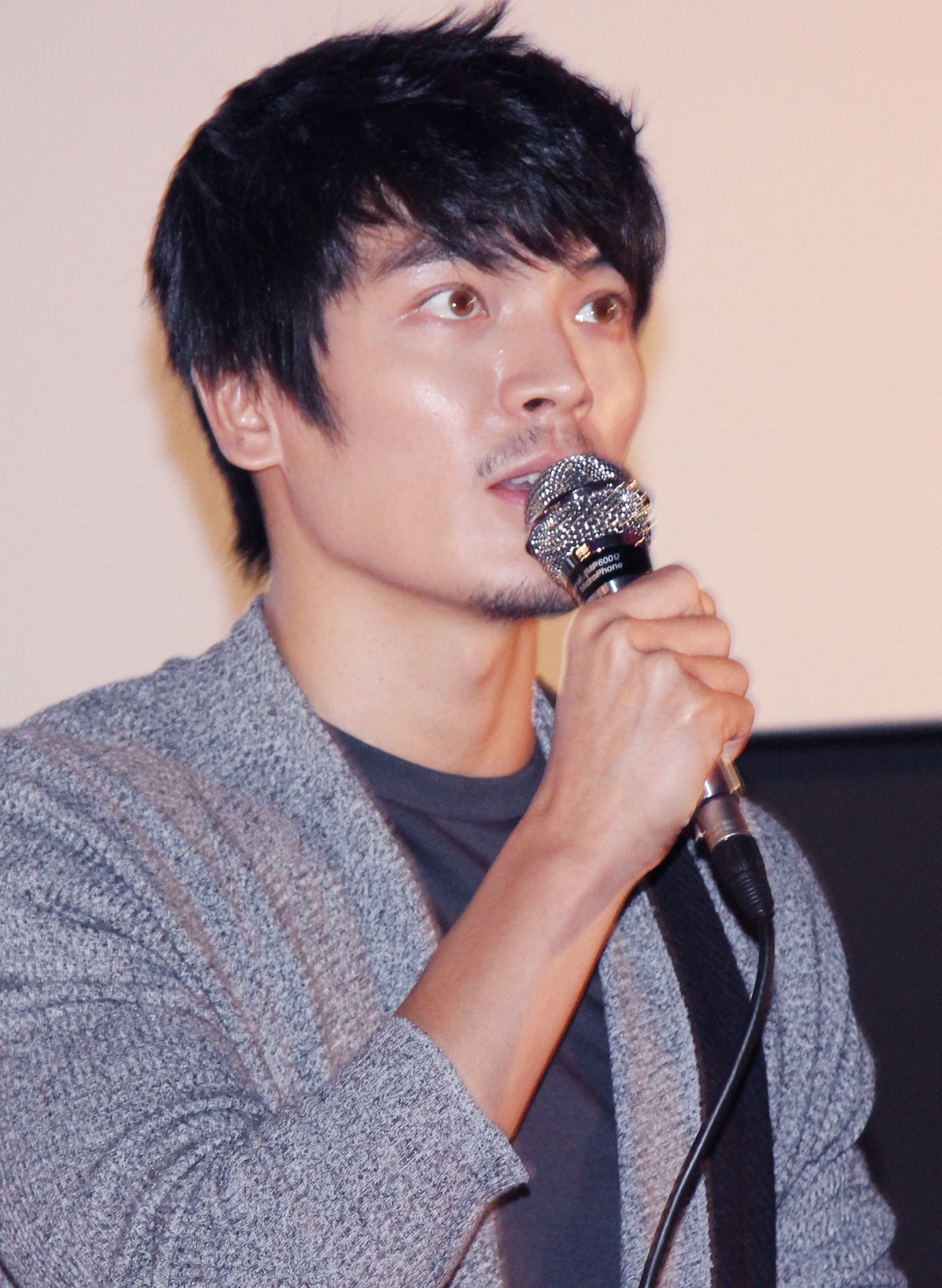
- Kim in 2013
- Born: September 15, 1978 (age 48); Nowon District, Seoul, South Korea
- Occupation: Actor
- Years active: 2000–present
- Agent: Ghost Studio
- Spouse: Choi Yu-jin (m. 2014)
- Children: 1

Korean name
- Hangul: 김성오
- RR: Gim Seongo
- MR: Kim Sŏngo

Kim Sung-oh (Korean: 김성오; born September 15, 1978) is a South Korean actor. He is best known for his supporting roles in the television series Secret Garden (2010–2011) and the film The Man from Nowhere (2010).

== Personal life ==
Kim was married in December 2014 to an ordinary person who is five years his junior. The two reportedly met in 2012 and began a relationship a year later. They have a son, born in 2016 named Kim Ah-il (김아일).

== Filmography ==
=== Film ===
Year	Title	Role	Notes	Ref.
2002	Emergency Act 19	Soldier 2 at vinyl house		
2003	Sword in the Moon	Mu-kwan's underling 3		
2004	Fighter in the Wind	flight school instructor		
2005	She's on Duty	one of Hammer's goons		
2005	A Bittersweet Life	Oh Moo-sung's subordinate		
2006	Lost in Love	man in couple		
2008	Life is Beautiful	guy with scary face		
2009	Kiss Me, Kill Me	gang member 1		
2009	White Night	40-year-old man		
2009	Potato Symphony	Jjang-goo ("Bulging head")		
2010	The Man from Nowhere	Jong-seok		
2012	My PS Partner	Seok-woon		
2012	Love 911	Yong-soo		
2012	The Tower	In-geon		
2013	Tough as Iron	Hwi-gon		
2014	Fashion King	Kim Nam-jung		
2015	You Call It Passion	Section chief Ma	Cameo	
2016	Missing You	Ki-bum		
2017	The Merciless	Jung Seung-pil	Cameo	
2018	Unstoppable	Ki-tae		
2018	Door Lock	Detective Lee		
2020	Secret Zoo	Kim Gun-wook		
2022	Kingmaker	Secretary Park		
2022	The Pirates: The Last Royal Treasure	Kang-seop		
2023	Kill Boksoon	Sergeant Shin		
2023	12.12: The Day	Kim Chang-se		
2025	Hitman 2	Chang Cheol-ryong		
2025	Good News	Seigo Maeda (the flight first officer)		

=== Television series ===
Year	Title	Role	Notes	Ref.
2005	Sad Love Story			
2007	Ghost Pang Pang	Sung Joo-shin, gigolo		
2007	Chosun Police 1			
2008	On Air	Kim Sung-oh, SW department manager	Cameo	
2009	Father's House			
2009	City Hall	paparazzo		
2009	Green Coach	Kim Kyung-shik		
2009	Will It Snow for Christmas?	Tae-joon's underling		
2010	Giant	Cha Boo-cheol		
2010	Secret Garden	Secretary Kim		
2011	Sign	Lee Ho-jin	Cameo (episode 15–19)	
2011	Midas	Kim Dong-cheol		
2011	Myung-wol the Spy	Cop in action movie	Cameo (episode 1)	
2011	KBS Drama Special "Terminal"	Man-soo		
2011	Glory Jane	Joo Dae-sung		
2012	History of a Salaryman	Prosecutor Park Moon-soo	Cameo (episode 20)	
2012	Phantom	Shin Hyo-jung's fan	Cameo (episode 1)	
2012	A Gentleman's Dignity	Officer Kim	Cameo (episode 15)	
2013	When a Man Falls in Love	Lee Chang-hee		
2014	Inspiring Generation	Jung Jae-hwa		
2014	Diary of a Night Watchman	Sadam		
2015	Warm and Cozy	Hwang Wook		
2015	She Was Pretty	Man Harassing Ha-Ri	Cameo (episode 3)	
2016	The Royal Gambler	Hwanghae-do's Gaejakdoo	Cameo (episode 10)	
2016	Squad 38	mortgage lender	Cameo	
2016	Becky's Back	Woo Bum-ryong		
2017	Fight for My Way	Hwang Jang-ho		
2017–2018	A Korean Odyssey	Lee Han-joo		
2020	Graceful Friends	Jo Hyung-woo		
2021	L.U.C.A.: The Beginning	Lee Son		
2021	The Great Shaman Ga Doo-shim	Sound of evil spirits	Voice cameo (Episode 1–2)	
2022	Money Heist: Korea – Joint Economic Area	Cha Moo-hyuk		
2022	Alice, the Ultimate Weapon	The hidden guardian of 'Winter		
2022	A Model Family	Choi Kang-jun		
2022	Desperate Mr. X	Seung-il	Cameo (episode 2)	
2022	Unlock My Boss	Ma-pi		
2023	Island	Yul	Part 2	
2023	Lies Hidden in My Garden	Park Jae-ho		
2025	One: High School Heroes	High school dean	Cameo (episode 8)	
2025	Low Life	Im Jeon-chul		
2025	Shin's Project	Choi Cheol		

=== Television shows ===
Year	Title	Role	Notes	Ref.
2021	On Rent: House on Wheels	Cast Member	with team actor The Pirates 2	

=== Music video appearances ===
Year	Song title	Artist
2003	"For a Long, Long Time"	Vibe
2005	"Cup of Tears"	Park Sang-min
2005	"그대만큼만"	Park Sang-min
2011	"To Live at Least Once"	4Men
2011	"I Love You"	4Men

=== Radio drama ===
Year	Title	Role
2011	Radio Secret Garden	Secretary Kim, Joo-won's assistant

== Awards and nominations ==
Year	Award	Category	Nominated work	Result
2011	47th Baeksang Arts Awards	Best New Actor (TV)	Secret Garden	Nominated
2011	4th Korea Drama Awards	Best Supporting Actor	Giant, Midas, Secret Garden	Nominated
2016	KBS Drama Awards	Excellence Award, Actor in a One-act Drama	Becky's Back	Won
2017	KBS Drama Awards	Best Supporting Actor	Fight My Way	Won
