= Spring Turns to Spring =

2019 South Korean television series

- Promotional poster
- Also known as: Spring Is Coming
- Hangul: 봄이 오나 봄
- Lit.: Spring Must Be Coming
- RR: Bomi ona bom
- MR: Pomi ona pom
- Genre: Fantasy; Comedy
- Directed by: Kim Sang-ho
- Starring: Lee Yu-ri; Uhm Ji-won; Lee Jong-hyuk; Choi Byung-mo
- Country of origin: South Korea
- Original language: Korean
- No. of episodes: 32 (Note: In order to circumvent Korean laws that prevent commercial breaks in the middle of an episode, what would previously have been aired as single 70 minute episodes are now being repackaged as two 35 minute episodes, with two episodes being shown each night with a commercial break between the two.)

Production
- Executive producer: Lee Jin-seok
- Camera setup: Single-camera
- Running time: 35 minutes
- Production company: JS Pictures

Original release
- Network: MBC TV
- Release: January 23 – March 21, 2019

Spring Turns to Spring (Korean: 봄이 오나 봄; RR: Bomi ona bom) is a 2019 South Korean television series starring Lee Yu-ri, Uhm Ji-won, Lee Jong-hyuk, and Choi Byung-mo. It aired on MBC TV from January 23 to March 21, 2019, every Wednesday and Thursday at 22:00 (KST).

== Synopsis ==
The story of two women whose souls switch bodies, giving them chance to live out their dreams and gain new experiences.

== Cast ==
=== Main ===
- Lee Yu-ri as Kim Bo-mi (32 years old), a beautiful and intelligent, but self-centered news anchor.
- Uhm Ji-won as Lee Bom (42 years old), a former popular actress who is now a devoted wife and mother.
- Lee Jong-hyuk as Lee Hyung-suk (39 years old), Bo-mi's team leader at the broadcasting station.
- Choi Byung-mo as Park Yoon-cheol (45 years old), Bom's husband who is a member of the National Assembly.

=== Supporting ===
==== Angel's House ====
- Ahn Se-ha as Heo Bom-sam
- Kim Nam-hee as Heo Bom-il
- Oh Young-shil as Sister Angelina

==== MBS Broadcasting Station ====
- Jung Han-heon as Yoon Young-hoo
- Kim Jeong-pal as Director Kim
- Mi Ram as Reporter Chun Soo-hyun
- Kim Yoon-joo as Writer Yeon Min-jeong

==== Others ====
- Carson Allen as Anastasia
- Kim Kwang-kyu as Representative Bang Kwang-gyu
- Son Eun-seo as Choi Seo-jin
- Lee Seo-yeon as Park Si-won, Bom's daughter.
- Yoo Jung-woo as Je Im-soo, a rising idol.
- Heo Tae-hee as Yoon Jin-woo
- Geum Chae-an as Kim Yu-ri

== Production ==
The first script reading of the cast was held on November 16, 2018.

== Original soundtrack ==
Spring Turns to Spring OST

Soundtrack album by Various Artists
- Released: 2018
- Genre: Soundtrack
- Languages: Korean; English
- Labels: Music&NEW, MusicBuddy, Vlending

=== Part 1 ===
Released on January 30, 2019
No.	Title	Lyrics	Music	Artist	Length
1.	"Well come to the BOM"	TAIBIAN	TAIBIAN, mOnSteR nO.9, Kim Bo-sun	Berry Good	3:11
2.	"Well come to the BOM" (Inst.)		TAIBIAN, mOnSteR nO.9, Kim Bo-sun		3:11
Total length:					6:22

=== Part 2 ===
Released on February 13, 2019
No.	Title	Lyrics	Music	Artist	Length
1.	"Hey Jude"	TAIBIAN	TAIBIAN, Bark	NATURE	3:12
2.	"Hey Jude" (Inst.)		TAIBIAN, Bark		3:12
Total length:					6:24

=== Part 3 ===
Released on February 20, 2019
No.	Title	Lyrics	Music	Artist	Length
1.	"Magic"	DAVINK	DAVINK	DAVINK, Stella Jang	3:44
2.	"Magic" (Inst.)		DAVINK		3:44
Total length:					7:28

=== Part 4 ===
Released on February 27, 2019
No.	Title	Lyrics	Music	Artist	Length
1.	"Oh My" (봄을 만나)	Oh Ji-hyun	Oh Ji-hyun	Laboum	3:27
2.	"Oh My" (Inst.)		Oh Ji-hyun		3:27
Total length:					6:54

=== Part 5 ===
Released on March 6, 2019
No.	Title	Lyrics	Music	Artist	Length
1.	"Happy Moments"	Khangu	Khangu, muto	Mackelli	3:57
2.	"Happy Moments" (Inst.)		Khangu, muto		3:57
Total length:					7:54

=== Part 6 ===
Released on March 13, 2019
No.	Title	Lyrics	Music	Artist	Length
1.	"Say My Name"	TAIBIAN	TAIBIAN, Jeon Yoon-gi	Yebin (DIA)	3:41
2.	"Say My Name" (Inst.)		TAIBIAN, Jeon Yoon-gi		3:41
Total length:					7:22

== Ratings ==
Ep.	Broadcast date	Title	Average audience share (Nielsen Korea)	
Ep.	Broadcast date	Title	Nationwide	Seoul
1	January 23, 2019	Change (체인지)	2.2%	2.1%
2	January 23, 2019	Change (체인지)	2.2%	2.2%
3	January 24, 2019	Change Again (또 다시 체인지)	1.5%	1.7%
4	January 24, 2019	Change Again (또 다시 체인지)	1.9%	2.1%
5	January 30, 2019	Couple or Trouble (Note: Literally translated into Fantasy Couple, the title is a reference to the 2006 television series Couple or Trouble.) (환장의 커플)	2.5%	2.7%
6	January 30, 2019	Couple or Trouble (환장의 커플)	2.4%	2.7%
7	January 31, 2019	Eternal Change (영원한 체인지)	1.7%	1.9%
8	January 31, 2019	Eternal Change (영원한 체인지)	2.4%	2.9%
9	February 7, 2019 (Note: No episodes were aired on February 6 due to the broadcast of the film 1987: When the Day Comes.)	Your Wedding Ceremony (너의 결혼식)	1.9%	2.3%
10	February 7, 2019	Your Wedding Ceremony (너의 결혼식)	2.0%	2.3%
11	February 13, 2019	Lion Face (사자대면)	2.0%	2.4%
12	February 13, 2019	Lion Face (사자대면)	2.4%	2.8%
13	February 14, 2019	Finding My Place (내 자리를 찾아서!)	2.0%	2.4%
14	February 14, 2019	Finding My Place (내 자리를 찾아서!)	2.1%	2.6%
15	February 20, 2019	There is No Reason to Die Lie This (이대로 죽으라는 법은 없지!)	2.0%	2.4%
16	February 20, 2019	There is No Reason to Die Lie This (이대로 죽으라는 법은 없지!)	2.4%	2.7%
17	February 21, 2019	I'll Kill You, Park Yun-chul VS Move, Lee Hyung-seok, Anchor is Mine! (죽여버릴거야, 박윤철 VS 앵커는 내꺼야, 이형석 비켜!)	2.1%	2.5%
18	February 21, 2019	I'll Kill You, Park Yun-chul VS Move, Lee Hyung-seok, Anchor is Mine! (죽여버릴거야, 박윤철 VS 앵커는 내꺼야, 이형석 비켜!)	2.4%	2.7%
19	February 28, 2019 (Note: No episodes were aired on February 27 due to news coverage on the 2019 DPRK-US Vietnam Summit.)	The Medicine Is Finished! Now You Just Have To Eat? (약이 완성됐어! 이제 먹기만 하면 되는데?)	2.6%	3.3%
20	February 28, 2019	The Medicine Is Finished! Now You Just Have To Eat? (약이 완성됐어! 이제 먹기만 하면 되는데?)	3.0%	3.5%
21	March 6, 2019	Unexpected Sentiment (뜻밖의 정의구현)	2.9%	3.3%
22	March 6, 2019	Unexpected Sentiment (뜻밖의 정의구현)	3.3%	3.7%
23	March 7, 2019	Where Is It? Who Am I? (여기는 어디? 난 누구?)	2.7%	3.5%
24	March 7, 2019	Where Is It? Who Am I? (여기는 어디? 난 누구?)	3.0%	3.8%
25	March 13, 2019	There Is No Reason To Die Like This! (여기는 어디? 난 누구?)	2.8%	3.2%
26	March 13, 2019	There Is No Reason To Die Like This! (여기는 어디? 난 누구?)	3.2%	3.7%
27	March 14, 2019	Coming Out (커밍아웃)	2.0%	2.2%
28	March 14, 2019	Coming Out (커밍아웃)	2.2%	2.5%
29	March 20, 2019	The Promise - Those Who Acquire The Medicine Bear The Weight (Note: The title is a reference to the 2013 television series The Heirs.) (약속자들 - 약을 획득하는 자 그 무게를 견뎌라)	3.6%	4.4%
30	March 20, 2019	The Promise - Those Who Acquire The Medicine Bear The Weight (약속자들 - 약을 획득하는 자 그 무게를 견뎌라)	4.3%	5.3%
31	March 21, 2019	Spring Is Back Again (봄이 또 왔나 봄)	3.0%	3.7%
32	March 21, 2019	Spring Is Back Again (봄이 또 왔나 봄)	3.5%	4.0%
Average			2.5%	2.9%
In the table above, the blue numbers represent the lowest ratings and the red numbers represent the highest ratings.
