= Jin Ji-hee =

South Korean actress (born 1999)

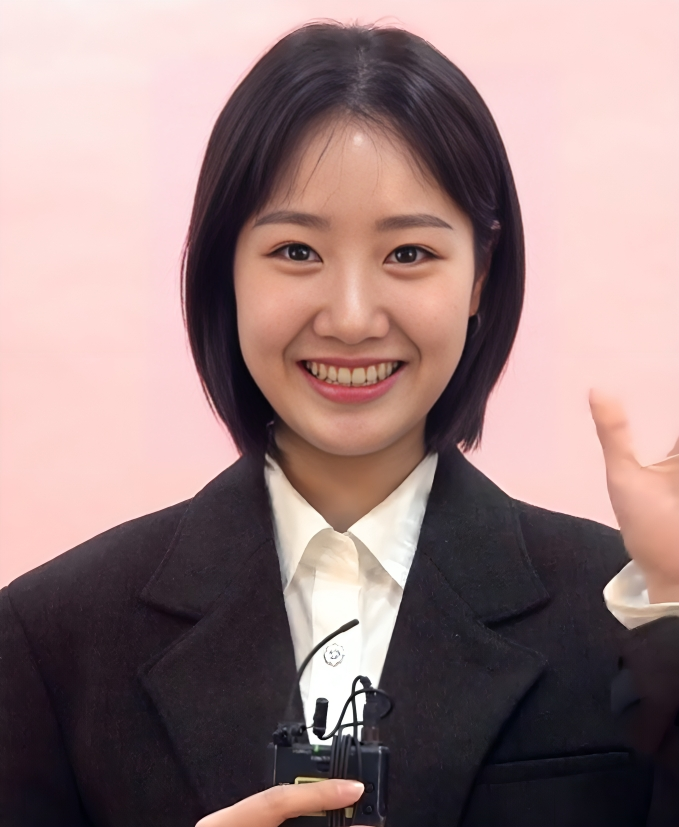
- Jin in January 2023
- Born: March 25, 1999 (age 27); Dongjak District, Seoul, South Korea
- Education: Dongguk University (Division of Theatre)
- Occupation: Actress
- Years active: 2003–present
- Agent: The Harry Media

Korean name
- Hangul: 진지희
- Hanja: 陳智熙
- RR: Jin Jihui
- MR: Chin Chihŭi

Jin Ji-hee (Korean: 진지희; born March 25, 1999) is a South Korean actress. She began her career as a child actress, and is best known for her roles in the relationship drama Alone in Love (2006), the horror fairytale Hansel and Gretel (2007), the family sitcom High Kick Through the Roof (2009), the teen mystery series Schoolgirl Detectives (2014), and The Penthouse: War in Life (2020–2021).

== Career ==
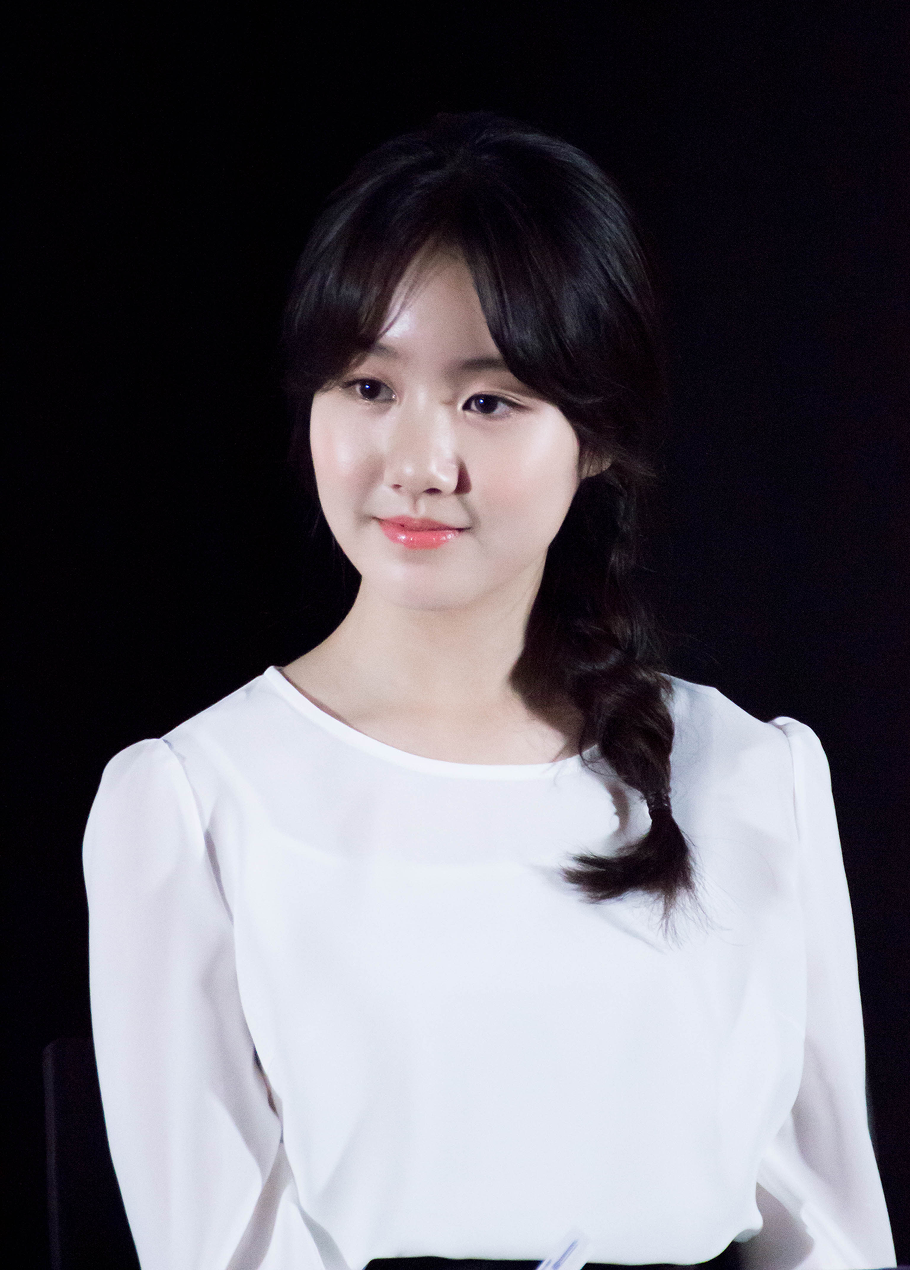
Jin in 2016

In June 2019, Jin signed with new agency C-JeS Studios.

In August 2025, Jin signed with new agency The Harry Media.

== Filmography ==
=== Film ===
| Year | Title | Role | Notes | Ref. |
|---|---|---|---|---|
| 2005 | Cello | Yoon-hye | | |
| 2006 | Bambi II | Thumper's sister (Korean dubbing) | Animated film | |
| 2007 | Hansel and Gretel | Jung-soon | | |
| 2007 | A Man Who Was Superman | Hee-jung / Ji-young | | |
| 2010 | Oceans | Narration (Korean dubbing) | Documentary | |
| 2011 | Hoichori | Joo-yeon / Song-yi | | |
| 2012 | Doomsday Book | Park Min-seo | Segment: Happy Birthday | |
| 2013 | Boomerang Family | Shin Min-kyung | | |
| 2014 | The Huntresses | young Jin-ok | | |
| 2015 | The Throne | Princess Hwawan | | |
| 2016 | Take off 2 | | | |
| 2017 | The Star Next Door | So Eun | | |

=== Television series ===
| Year | Title | Role | Notes | Ref. |
|---|---|---|---|---|
| 2003 | Yellow Handkerchief | Lee Yoo-na | | |
| 2004 | First Love of a Royal Prince | | | |
| 2006 | Seoul 1945 | Choi Eun-hee (young) | | |
| 2006 | Alone in Love | Jo Eun-sol | | |
| 2006 | Great Inheritance | Goo Dong-joo | | |
| 2008 | East of Eden | Lee Gi-soon (young) | | |
| 2009 | Ja Myung Go | Princess Ra-hee (young) | | |
| 2009 | Hometown Legends | Hyo-eun | Episode "The Quiet Village" | |
| 2009 | High Kick Through the Roof | Jung Hae-ri | | |
| 2010 | Birdie Buddy | Mi-soo (young) | | |
| 2011 | Insu, the Queen Mother | Songyi | | |
| 2012 | High Kick: Revenge of the Short Legged | Hae-ri | Cameo (episode 110) | |
| 2012 | Moon Embracing the Sun | Princess Min-hwa (young) | | |
| 2013 | Goddess of Fire | young Yoo Jung | | |
| 2014 | Can We Fall in Love, Again? | Lee Se-ra | | |
| 2014 | Schoolgirl Detectives | Ahn Chae-yool | Lead role | |
| 2016 | Becky's Back | Yang Ok-hee | | |
| 2017 | Fight for My Way | Jang Bo-ram | Cameo (episode 1 and 7) | |
| 2017 | Band of Sisters | Kang Ha-sae | | |
| 2018 | 100 Days My Prince | Jin Rin | Cameo (episode 13) | |
| 2020–2021 | The Penthouse: War in Life | Yoo Je-ni | Season 1–3 | |
| 2023 | Perfect Marriage Revenge | Han Yoo-ra | | |

=== Web series ===
| Year | Title | Role | Notes | Ref. |
|---|---|---|---|---|
| 2020 | The Temperature Of Language: Our Nineteen | Woo Jin-ah | | |

=== Television shows ===
| Year | Title | Role | Notes | Ref. |
|---|---|---|---|---|
| 2005 | Bboongbboong-E | | | |
| 2010 | When Pigs Fly, Part 2 (돼지 날다 2부) | Commentator | | |
| 2010 | Life of Exploration | Moderator | | |
| 2011 | Kim Yu-na's Kiss & Cry | Contestant | As skater with Cha Jun-hwan | |
| 2022 | Restaurant Forgotten 2 | Cast Member | young deputy manager | |

=== Hosting ===
| Year | Title | Notes | Ref. |
|---|---|---|---|
| 2022 | Opening ceremony 18th Jecheon International Music & Film Festival | with Lee Chung-ju | |

=== Music video appearances ===
| Year | Title | Artist | Ref. |
|---|---|---|---|
| 2010 | "Present" | K.Will | |
| 2012 | "Peace Song" | Lena Park | |

== Theater ==
| Year | Title | Role | Ref. |
|---|---|---|---|
| 2021 | Julius Caesar | Marcus Brutus | |
| 2022–2023 | The Seagull | Nina | |
| 2025 | The Old Man's Dream | Mary Warren | |
| 2026 | The Seagull | Nina | |

== Discography ==
=== Singles ===
| Title | Year | Peak chart position | Album |
| Title | Year | KOR Gaon | Album |
|---|---|---|---|
| "Oceans" | 2010 | — | Non-album single |
"—" denotes a recording that did not chart

== Ambassadorship ==
- Public Relations Ambassador for the Seoul International Architecture Film Festival (2022)

== Awards and nominations ==
Name of the award ceremony, year presented, category, nominee of the award, and the result of the nomination
| Award ceremony | Year | Category | Nominee / Work | Result | Ref. |
|---|---|---|---|---|---|
| Brand Customer Loyalty Award | 2021 | Female Actress – Rising Star | Jin Ji-hee | Won | |
| Grand Bell Awards | 2013 | Best Supporting Actress | Boomerang Family | Nominated | |
| KBS Drama Awards | 2016 | Best Young Actress | Becky's Back | Nominated | |
| KBS Drama Awards | 2020 | Best Actress in a One-Act/Special/Short Drama | KBS Drama Special – Modern Girl | Nominated | |
| Korean Culture and Entertainment Awards | 2021 | Excellence Actress Award | The Penthouse: War in Life | Won | |
| MBC Drama Awards | 2012 | Best Young Actress | Moon Embracing the Sun | Nominated | |
| MBC Entertainment Awards | 2009 | Best Young Actor/Actress | High Kick Through the Roof | Won | |
