= Park Seo-yeon =

South Korean actress (born 2002)

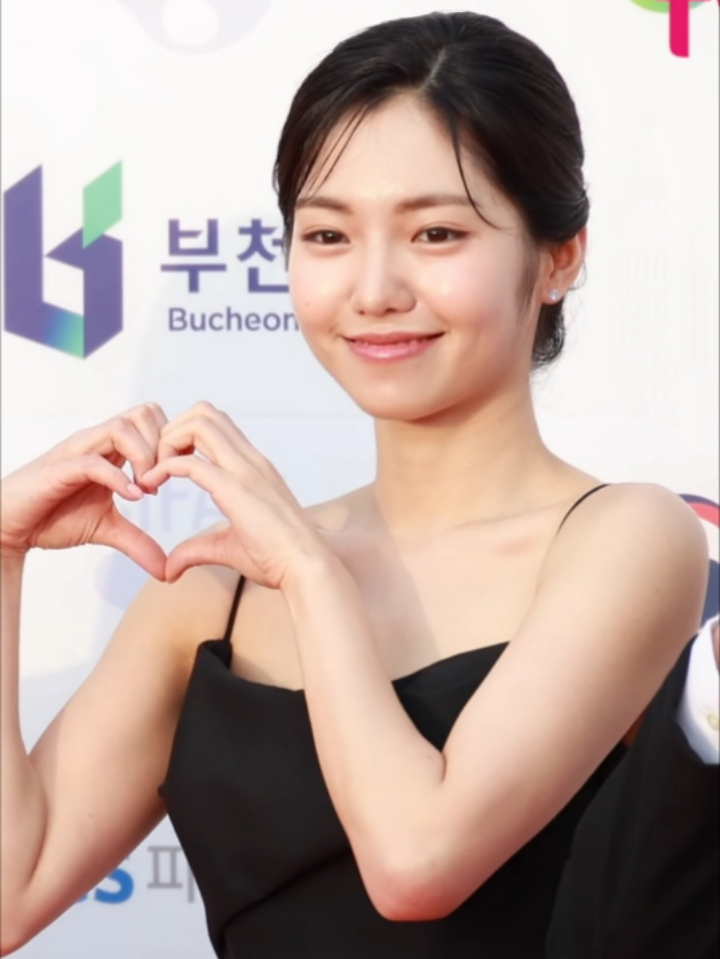
- Park in July 2025
- Born: March 5, 2002 (age 24); Incheon, South Korea
- Education: Goyang Arts High School
- Occupation: Actress
- Years active: 2011–present
- Agent: Fidespartium

Korean name
- Hangul: 박서연
- RR: Bak Seoyeon
- MR: Pak Sŏyŏn

Park Seo-yeon (Korean: 박서연; born March 5, 2002) is a South Korean actress. Formerly a child actress, she made her acting debut in 2011, since then, she has appeared in number of films and television series. She is known for her various roles as child actor. She was nominated for Best Young Actress Award in 2016 for the KBS's TV series The Promise and On the Way to the Airport. She has acted in films also such as: 26 Years (2012) and Scarlet Innocence (2014). In 2022, she is cast in fantasy TV series From Now On, Showtime!.

== Career ==
Park was born on March 5, 2002. After graduating in acting from the Goyang Arts High School, she made her debut in the 2011 short film Working on Saturday.

Park has played childhood role of Soo Ae's in A Thousand Days' Promise (2011), Hwang Jung-eum's in Lucky Romance (2016) and Seo Ji-hye's in Crash Landing on You (2020), establishing herself as a child actress. She has appeared in films playing young role in 26 Years (2012), Happiness for Sale (2013), and Scarlet Innocence (2014).

In 2022, she is cast in MBC's fantasy TV series From Now On, Showtime! as ghost Kang Ah-reum alongside Park Hae-jin a ghost employer.

== Filmography ==
=== Films ===
Year	Title	Role	Notes	Ref.
2011	Working on Saturday	Main role	Short film	
2012	26 Years	Young Sim Mi-jin		
2013	The Gifted Hands	Yeon-i		
2013	Happiness for Sale	Jin-Hee		
2014	Scarlet Innocence	Young Chung-yi		

=== Television series ===
Year	Title	Role	Notes	Ref.
2011	A Thousand Days' Promise	Young Seo-yeon		
2012	Hero	Young Jang Chae-ok		
2013	The End of the World	Soo-jung		
2013	Heartless City	Young Lee Kyeong-mi		
2013	Goddess of Fire		Guest role	
2014	Shining Romance	Young Bit-na		
2014	Jang Bo-ri Is Here!	Young In-hwa		
2014	Quiz of God 4	Young Ho-yeon		
2015	House of Bluebird	Young Han Seon-hee		
2015	Divorce Lawyer in Love		Guest role	
2015	The Producers	Young trainee		
2015	The Return of Hwang Geum-bok	Young Hwang Geum-bok		
2015	Hello Monster	Middle school student Cha Ji-an		
2016	The Promise	Young Lee Na-yeon / Baek Do-hee		
2016	Choco Bank	Young Mal-nyeon	Web series	
2016	Lucky Romance	Young Bo-nui		
2016	On the Way to the Airport	Annie Seo / Seo Eun-woo		
2016-17	Our Gap-soon	Jo Cho-rong		
2017	Queen for Seven Days	young Yoon Myung-hye		
2017	KBS Drama Special: "Kang Duk-soon's Love History"	Na Hae-hyang	Episode 6	
2018	Hold Me Tight	Young Nam Hyeon-joo		
2018	Sweet Revenge 2	Jeong Bo-ra		
2018	Where Stars Land	Gong So-hee		
2018	Twelve Nights	Young Han Yoo-Kyung		
2019	The Banker	No Han-sol		
2019	One Fine Week	Yoo Ah-ri	Web series	
2019–20	Crash Landing on You	Young Dan		
2020	The Uncanny Counter	Kim Dan-oh		
2021	Joseon Exorcist	Chae Yi	Cancelled after 2 episodes	
2022	Bad and Crazy	A murderer	Cameo (Ep. 8)	
2022	From Now On, Showtime!	Kang Ah-reum		

== Awards and nominations ==
Name of the award ceremony, year presented, category, nominee of the award, and the result of the nomination
Award ceremony	Year	Category	Nominee / Work	Result	Ref.
KBS Drama Awards	2016	Best Young Actress	The Promise	Nominated	
MBC Drama Awards	2022	Best New Actress	From Now On, Showtime!	Nominated	
