= In Gyo-jin =

South Korean actor (born 1980)

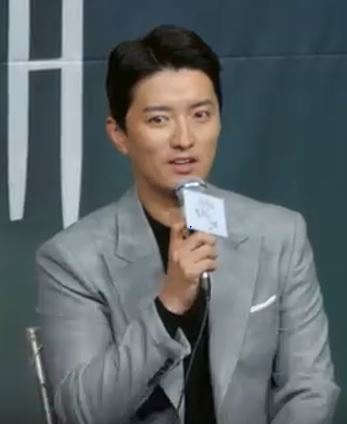
- In in 2018
- Born: August 29, 1980 (age 46); Jochiwon, South Chungcheong Province, South Korea
- Other name: Do Yi-sung
- Education: Bugil High School; Dankook University (dropped out)
- Occupation: Actor
- Years active: 2000–present
- Agent: Blitzway Entertainment
- Spouse: So Yi-hyun (m. 2014)
- Children: 2

Korean name
- Hangul: 인교진
- Hanja: 印喬鎭
- RR: In Gyojin
- MR: In Kyojin

In Gyo-jin (Korean: 인교진; Hanja: 印喬鎭; born August 29, 1980) is a South Korean actor. He is best known for his supporting roles in various television dramas.

== Career ==
In was born in Jochiwon, Yeongi County, South Chungcheong Province (now Sejong City). He studied English Language and Literature at Dankook University.

In made his acting debut in 2000, first appearing in the long-running television series Lifetime in the Country. Early in his career, his then-agency proposed that he use a stage name, and he was known as Do Yi-sung (Korean: 도이성) until 2011. In 2012, he reverted to using his birth name under the advice of his agency Madin Entertainment. He signed with a new agency in 2015, KeyEast which also managed his wife, actress So Yi-hyun. The couple left KeyEast in 2020 along with fellow entertainers Jung Ryeo-won and Son Dam-bi and joined H& Entertainment, which was founded by KeyEast's former general manager Hong Min-ki.

== Personal life ==
His father, In Chi-wan, is the CEO of a plastic manufacturing company. In is the eldest of two siblings and his younger brother, In Doo-jin, is also an actor.

In married actress So Yi-hyun on October 4, 2014. In and So had been friends for a decade before dating; they were costars in Fairy and Swindler (2003), Aeja's Older Sister, Minja (2008) and Happy Ending (2012). Their first child, a daughter named In Ha-eun, was born on December 4, 2015. In Gyo-jin and his daughter were cast members of the KBS2's variety show The Return of Superman. On April 23, 2017, it was reported that In Gyo-jin and So Yi-hyun were expecting their second child. In October 2017, they welcomed their second daughter.

== Filmography ==
=== Films ===
Year	Title	Role	Notes/Ref.
2002	The Hidden Princess	Soo-il	
2006	Holy Daddy	Lee Chang-soo	
2008	The Divine Weapon	In-ha	Special appearance
2016	Mood of the Day	Dong-wook	
2022	Come Back Home	Sang-man	

=== Television series ===
Year	Title	Role	Notes/Ref.
2000	Lifetime in the Country	Jae-dong	
2001	Three Friends	Restaurant waiter	(cameo)
2001	How Should I Be	Min-soo	
2001	I Want to See Your Face		
2003	A Windy Gene	Jung-hak	
2003	Fairy and Swindler	Go Min-sang	
2005	That Summer's Typhoon		
2006	How Much Love	Oh Soo-chul	
2008	Aeja's Older Sister, Minja	Park Ha-jin	
2009	Queen Seondeok	Kim Yong-choon	
2011	The Greatest Love	Han Mi-na's husband	
2011	Miss Ajumma	Lee Byung-chul	
2011	If Tomorrow Comes	Lee Sung-ryong	
2012	Happy Ending	Lee Sung-hoon	
2012	I Need Romance 2012	Han Jung-min	
2012	The King's Doctor	Kwon Suk-chul	
2013	Hur Jun, The Original Story	Prince Gwanghae	
2013	Good Doctor	Lee Soo-jin's husband (ep.12)	
2013	Waiting for Love	Joo Yeon-ae ex-boyfriend	Cameo
2013	More and More	Tae-won	
2014	Cunning Single Lady	Man in TV program	Caemo (episode 1)
2014	Tears of Heaven	Jin Hyun-woong	
2014	Birth of a Beauty	Gyo Ji-hoon	
2015	Make a Woman Cry	Hwang Kyung-chul	
2015	Cheer Up!	Im Soo-yong	
2016	Becky's Back	Hong Doo-sik	
2016	Sweet Stranger and Me	Emergency room doctor	Cameo (ep.1–2)
2016	Entourage	Himself	Cameo (ep.6)
2016	My Fair Lady	Car repair shop owner	Cameo
2017	Ms. Perfect	Hong Sam-gyu	
2017	Fight for My Way	Kim In-gyo	Cameo
2017	Jugglers	Jo Sang-Moo	
2018	Feel Good to Die	Kang In-han	
2018	After the Rain	Kang-soo	One-act drama
2019	Welcome to Waikiki 2	Kwak Ha-ni	Cameo (ep. 5)
2019	My Country: The New Age	Park Moon-bok	
2019	When the Camellia Blooms	Hwang Doo-shik	Cameo (ep. 26)
2020–2021	Homemade Love Story	Kim Hwak-se	
2021	Hometown Cha-Cha-Cha	Jang Young-guk	
2022	Love All Play	Joo Sang-hyeon	
2023	The Secret Romantic Guesthouse	Yook Ho	
2024	Who Is She	Choi Min-seok	

=== Television shows ===
Year	Title	Role	Notes/Ref.
2016	The Return of Superman	Cast member	with his daughter, In Ha-eun
2018	Same Bed, Different Dreams 2: You Are My Destiny	Cast member	Eps 31 - 115
2020	Like Likes Like	Cast member	
2022–2023	High School Dad	Host	Season 1–3
2022–2023	Dads from across the water	Host	with Jang Yoon-jeong and Kim Na-young
2023	Oh Eun-young's Game	Judge	

== Theater ==
List of Stage Play(s)
Year	Title		Role	Theater	Date	Ref.
Year	English	Korean	Role	Theater	Date	Ref.
2013	Hurry Sale Happy Apartment - Yeoncheon	급매 행복아파트 천사호 - 연천	Junsu	Yeoncheon Sureul Art Hall	2013.11.29 ~ 2013.11.29	
2013	Hurry Sale Happy Apartment - Cheonho	급매 행복아파트 천사호	Junsu	Mimaji Art Center Noon Theater	2013.05.04 ~ 2013.08.31	
2010	Love Play	연애희곡	Masaya Mukai	Chungmu Art Center Small Theater Blue	2010.09.04 ~ 2010.10.31	

== Awards and nominations ==
Name of the award ceremony, year presented, category, nominee of the award, and the result of the nomination
Award ceremony	Year	Category	Nominee / Work	Result	Ref.
APAN Star Awards	2021	Best Supporting Actor	Homemade Love Story	Nominated	
KBS Drama Awards	2016	Best Supporting Actor	Becky's Back	Nominated	
KBS Drama Awards	2017	Best Supporting Actor	Girls' Generation 1979; Ms. Perfect	Nominated	
KBS Drama Awards	2018	Best Supporting Actor	Feel Good to Die; Jugglers	Won	
KBS Drama Awards	2020	Best Supporting Actor	Homemade Love Story	Nominated	
MBC Drama Awards	2015	Best Supporting Actor in a Serial Drama	Make a Woman Cry	Nominated	
SBS Drama Awards	2023	Best Supporting Actor in a Miniseries Romance/Comedy Drama	The Secret Romantic Guesthouse	Nominated	
SBS Entertainment Awards	2018	Best Family (with So Yi-hyun)	Same Bed, Different Dreams 2: You Are My Destiny	Won	
