= Lee Yu-ri =

South Korean actress (born 1980)

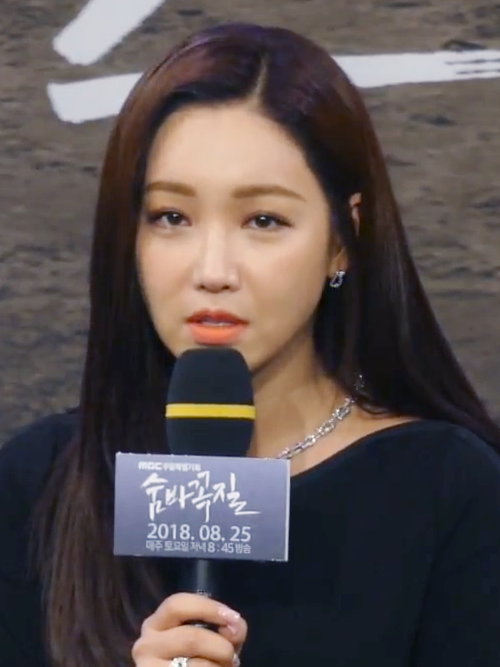
- Lee in August 2018
- Born: January 28, 1980 (age 46); Eungam, Eunpyeong, Seoul, South Korea
- Education: Kyewon University of Arts and Design
- Occupation: Actress
- Years active: 2001–present
- Agent: The Jun Entertainment
- Spouse: Jo Kye-hyun (m. 2010)

Korean name
- Hangul: 이유리
- Hanja: 李幼梨
- RR: I Yuri
- MR: I Yuri
- Website: Official website

Lee Yu-ri (Korean: 이유리; born January 28, 1980) is a South Korean actress. Lee first became known for her role in the teen drama series School 4, and subsequently gained popularity with her role in the family drama Precious Family (2005). In recent years, she became known for her role as the antagonist in television drama series Twinkle Twinkle (2011) and Jang Bo-ri Is Here! (2014). She most recently starred in Spring Turns to Spring (2019) and Lie After Lie (2020).

In 2014, Lee won the Grand Prize at MBC Drama Awards, gaining 385,434 (about 54%) out of 712,300 votes sent in by the viewers. She was also ranked in the top five of Gallup Korea's "Actor of the Year", climbing to second place just behind Kim Soo-hyun.

== Other activities ==
In 2011, Lee and fellow actress Kim Soo-kyum co-launched female apparel shopping mall Miss Today.

== Personal life ==
Lee Yu-ri met her husband, a missionary theologian, through bible study in 2008. They started dating in 2009 and married in September 2010.

== Filmography ==
=== Film ===
Year	Title	Role	Notes	Ref.
2004	Bunshinsaba	Kim In-sook		
2005	Friendly and Harmonious			
2022	The Singer	Gan Nan		

=== Television series ===
Year	Title	Role	Notes	Ref.
1999	Hur Jun	One of the court maids	Pre-debut (extra role)	
1999	MBC Best Theater		Pre-debut (extra role)	
2001	This Is What Love Is	Oh Yoon-a		
2001	Empress Myeongseong	Empress Sunmyeong		
2001	School 4	Park Seo-won		
2002	MBC Best Theater	Su-jin	Episode "Being a Mom Is Burdensome"	
2002	Loving You	Jo Soo-kyung		
2003	Argon	Kang Kang-hee		
2003	Yellow Handkerchief	Na Mi-ryeong		
2003	Twenty	Chae-ri		
2003	Wife	Kim Yoon-joo		
2004	Precious Family	Ahn Seong-mi		
2005	Young-jae's Golden Days	Joo Eun-jae		
2006	Invincible Parachute Agent	Kang Eun-hyuk's past lover	Cameo (Episode 1)	
2006	Love and Ambition	Park Sun-hee		
2008	Don't Cry My Love	Jo Mi-soo		
2008	Mom's Dead Upset	Na Young-mi		
2010	Daring Women	Ji Soon-young		
2011	My Daughter the Flower	The cafe owner	Cameo (Episode 1)	
2011	Twinkle Twinkle	Hwang Geum-ran		
2012	Blue Tower	Kim Yoo-ri	Cameo (Episode 44 of Season 2)	
2012	Ice Adonis	Seol Yeon-hwa		
2013	Your Lady	Lee Eun-soo / Oh Yoo-jung		
2014	MBC Drama Festival	Radio DJ	Episode : Guitar and Hot Pants	
2014	Jang Bo-ri Is Here!	Yeon Min-jung		
2015	Super Daddy Yeol	Cha Mi-rae		
2016	Honey, I am Sorry	Xia Churong	Chinese drama	
2016	KBS Drama Special	Yoon Da-jung	Episode : Pinocchio's Nose	
2016	Another Miss Oh	Park Do-kyung's mother (Young)	Cameo (Episode 10)	
2016	The Promise	Lee Na-yeon / Baek Do-hee		
2017	Band of Sisters	Yeon Min-jeong	Cameo (Episode 64)	
2017	Ms. Perfect	Lee Jung-soon / Lee Yu-ri	Cameo (Episode 1,18)	
2017	Strongest Deliveryman	Yoon Hwa-young	Cameo (Episode 10–11)	
2017	My Father Is Strange	Byun Hye-young		
2018	Hide and Seek	Min Chae-rin		
2019	Spring Turns to Spring	Kim Bo-mi		
2020	Lie After Lie	Ji Eun-Soo		
2022	Becoming Witch	Gong Ma-ri		

=== Television shows ===
Year	Title	Role	Notes	Ref.
2012	Food Essay	Host		
2013	Bright Solutionists	Host		
2014–2015	Quiz to Change the World	Host	Episode 274–283	
2014	MBC Gayo Daejejeon	Host		
2017	Single Wife Season 1	Host		
2017	2017 KBS Drama Awards	Host		
2018	Single Wife Season 2	Host		
2020–present	Stars' Top Recipe at Fun-Staurant	Cast (chef)	Episode 14–present	
2021	Comfortable Café	MC	Season 1	
2021–present	Extreme Concern Counseling Center	MC		
2021	Legend Music Class - Lalaland	Cast Member		
2021	Legendary Actors	Main Cast	Chuseok special program	
2022	Dog-Daughter-in-law	Host		
2022	Running Full Course	Cast Member	Pilot program	
2023	Walking Into the Fantastic	Host	with Park Na-rae and Kyuhyun	

=== Music video appearances ===
Year	Song title	Artist	Album	Ref.
2002	"You Touched My Heart"	Sung Si-kyung	Melodie D'Amour	
2004	"Tonight"	Hong Kyung-min	Listen and Repeat	
2007	"All I Need Is Your Love"	Baek Ji-young	The Sixth Miracle	

== Discography ==
=== Singles ===
Title	Year	Album
"I Remember My Heart"	2012	Yellow Boots
"I Will Live for You"	2018	Hide and Seek

== Ambassadorship ==
Year	Title	Campaign organiser	Ref.
2011	Goodwill Ambassador for Ministry of Unification	Ministry of Unification	
2011	Goodwill Ambassador for Good People	Good People	
2008	Goodwill Ambassador for 3rd Seoul Christianity Film Festival	Seoul International Agape Film Festival	
2008	Goodwill Ambassador for Seoul Metro	Seoul Metropolitan Subway Corporation	

== Accolades ==
=== Awards and nominations ===
Name of the award ceremony, year presented, category, nominee of the award, and the result of the nomination
Award ceremony	Year	Category	Nominee / Work	Result	Ref.
Asia Influential Awards	2015	Prize for Most Attractive Actress	Jang Bo-ri Is Here!	Won	
APAN Star Awards	2014	Top Excellence Award, Actress in a Serial Drama	Jang Bo-ri Is Here!	Nominated	
APAN Star Awards	2018	Top Excellence Award, Actress in a Serial Drama	Hide and Seek	Nominated	
Baeksang Arts Awards	2015	Best Actress – Television	Jang Bo-ri Is Here!	Nominated	
Brand of the Year Awards	2017	Actress of the Year	My Father Is Strange	Won	
KBS Drama Awards	2001	Best Young Actress	School 4	Won	
KBS Drama Awards	2002	Best New Actress	Loving You	Won	
KBS Drama Awards	2016	Top Excellence Award, Actress	The Promise	Nominated	
KBS Drama Awards	2016	Excellence Award, Actress in a Daily Drama	The Promise	Won	
KBS Drama Awards	2017	Top Excellence Award, Actress	My Father Is Strange	Won	
KBS Drama Awards	2017	Excellence Award, Actress in a Serial Drama	My Father Is Strange	Nominated	
KBS Drama Awards	2017	Netizen Award, Actress	My Father Is Strange	Nominated	
KBS Drama Awards	2017	Best Couple	Lee Yu-ri with Ryu Soo-young; My Father Is Strange	Won	
KBS Entertainment Awards	2020	Excellence Award – Entertainment Category	Stars' Top Recipe at Fun-Staurant	Won	
KCA Consumer Day Awards	2018	Best Drama Actor	Hide and Seek	Won	
Korea Culture and Entertainment Awards	2018	Grand Prize (Daesang)	Hide and Seek	Won	
Korea Drama Awards	2011	Best Supporting Actress	Twinkle Twinkle	Won	
MBC Drama Awards	2011	Excellence Award, Actress in a Serial Drama	Twinkle Twinkle	Won	
MBC Drama Awards	2014	Grand Prize (Daesang) (Determined through viewer's votes)	Jang Bo-ri Is Here!	Won	
MBC Drama Awards	2014	Top Excellence Award, Actress in a Serial Drama	Jang Bo-ri Is Here!	Nominated	
MBC Drama Awards	2014	Popularity Award, Actress	Jang Bo-ri Is Here!	Nominated	
MBC Drama Awards	2014	PD Award	Jang Bo-ri Is Here!	Won	
MBC Drama Awards	2018	Grand Prize (Daesang)	Hide and Seek	Nominated	
MBC Drama Awards	2018	Top Excellence Award, Actress in a Weekend Drama	Hide and Seek	Won	
MBC Drama Awards	2019	Top Excellence Award, Actress in a Wednesday-Thursday Miniseries	Spring Turns to Spring	Nominated	
SBS Drama Awards	2006	Queen of Tears	Love and Ambition	Won	
SBS Drama Awards	2010	Top Excellence Award, Actress in a Weekend/Daily Drama	Daring Women	Nominated	
SBS Entertainment Awards	2017	Best Entertainer Award	Single Wife	Won	
Seoul Arts College	2015	SAC Art Award	Lee Yu-ri	Won	
Seoul International Drama Awards	2021	Outstanding Korean Actress	Lie After Lie	Nominated	
University Film Festival of Korea	2021	Best Actress	The Singer	Won	

=== Listicles ===
Name of publisher, year listed, name of listicle, and placement
Publisher	Year	Listicle	Placement	Ref.
Forbes	2015	Korea Power Celebrity	28th	
