= Becky's Back =

2016 South Korean television series

- Also known as: Baek-hee Has Returned
- Hangul: 백희가 돌아왔다
- RR: Baekhuiga dorawatda
- MR: Paekhŭiga torawatta
- Genre: Family comedy
- Created by: KBS Drama Division
- Written by: Lim Sang-choon
- Directed by: Cha Young-hoon
- Starring: Kang Ye-won; Jin Ji-hee; Kim Sung-oh; Choi Dae-chul; In Gyo-jin; Choi Phillip
- Music by: Gaemi
- Country of origin: South Korea
- Original language: Korean
- No. of episodes: 4

Production
- Executive producers: Hong Suk-gyu; Han Sung-ho; Oh Han-min
- Producer: Lee Na-jeong
- Running time: 61–65 minutes
- Production company: FNC Entertainment

Original release
- Network: KBS2
- Release: June 6 – June 14, 2016

Becky's Back (Korean: 백희가 돌아왔다; lit. 'Baek-hee Is Back') is a four-episode Korean drama starring Kang Ye-won, Jin Ji-hee, Kim Sung-oh, Choi Dae-chul, In Gyo-jin and Choi Phillip. that aired on KBS2 from June 6, 2016 to June 14, 2016.

== Synopsis ==
Shin Ok-hee, a frequent runaway and borderline delinquent, reluctantly relocates with her parents to their hometown of Seomwoldo, an island in the middle of nowhere. Her mother Yang Baek-hee (Becky) had left her hometown eighteen year previously as an unwed mother and under a cloud of scandal. In Seomwoldo, Ok-hee discovers that she has more in common with her mother than she knew, and encounters three men — all of whom believe themselves to be her biological father. In her attempts to discover her parentage, Ok-hee unlocks secrets that allow lives and loves to heal.

== Cast ==
- Kang Ye-won as Yang Baek-hee (Becky)
- Jin Ji-hee as Shin Ok-hee
- Kim Sung-oh as Woo Bum-ryong
- Choi Dae-chul as Cha Jong-myung
- In Gyo-jin as Hong Doo-sik
- Choi Phillip as Shin Ki-joon
- Kim Hyun-sook as Hwang Jang-mi
- Yoo Hae-jung as Hong Bo-reum
- Jo Yang-ja as Jum-rye
- Lee Yong-nyeo as Passenger ship passenger
- Han Tae-il as Villager
- Nam Jung-hee as Villager
- Jo Ryun as Villager
- Kim Jung-young as Hong Doo-sik's older sister
- Park Young-soo as Mr. Jung (pork restaurant owner)
- Hong Kyung-yeon as Supermarket owner
- Jeon Bae-soo as Teacher
- In Sung-ho as Police
- Kim In-kyung as Nam Joo-ri
- Choi Gyo-sik as Taxi driver
- Jo Mi-nyeo as Choi Myung-sun
- Lee Jae-wook as Barber
- Kim Hyun as Neighbor

== Ratings ==
In this table, the blue numbers represent the lowest ratings and the red numbers represent the highest ratings.

Ep.	Original broadcast date	Average audience share			
Ep.	Original broadcast date	TNmS		AGB Nielsen	
Ep.	Original broadcast date	Nationwide	Seoul	Nationwide	Seoul
1	June 6, 2016	8.8% (14th)	9.6% (12th)	9.4% (11th)	9.9% (8th)
2	June 7, 2016	7.8% (15th)	8.1% (14th)	9.0% (11th)	10.1% (7th)
3	June 13, 2016	7.8% (18th)	8.7% (11th)	10.0% (8th)	10.6% (8th)
4	June 14, 2016	9.1% (10th)	9.3% (11th)	10.4% (7th)	11.6% (4th)
Average		8.4%	8.9%	9.7%	10.6%

== Awards and nominations ==
Year	Award	Category	Recipient	Result
2016	30th KBS Drama Awards	Excellence Award, Actor in a One-Act/Special/Short Drama	Kim Sung-oh	Won
2016	30th KBS Drama Awards	Excellence Award, Actress in a One-Act/Special/Short Drama	Kang Ye-won	Won
2016	30th KBS Drama Awards	Best Supporting Actor	In Gyo-jin	Nominated
2016	30th KBS Drama Awards	Best Supporting Actor	Choi Dae-chul	Nominated
2016	30th KBS Drama Awards	Best Young Actress	Jin Ji-hee	Nominated
