= The Promise (2016 TV series) =

South Korean television series

- Promotional poster
- Hangul: 천상의 약속
- Lit.: Heaven's Promise
- RR: Cheonsangui yaksok
- MR: Ch'ŏnsangŭi yaksok
- Genre: Melodrama; Revenge
- Created by: KBS Drama Production (KBS 드라마 제작국)
- Written by: Kim Yoon-shin; Heo In-moo
- Directed by: Jeon Woo-sung
- Starring: Lee Yu-ri; Seo Jun-young; Park Ha-na; Song Jong-ho
- Country of origin: South Korea
- Original language: Korean
- No. of episodes: 102

Production
- Executive producer: Lee Hyang-bong
- Running time: 35 minutes
- Production company: Neo Entertainment

Original release
- Network: KBS2
- Release: February 1 – June 24, 2016

The Promise (Korean: 천상의 약속; RR: Cheonsangui yaksok; lit. 'Heaven's Promise') is a 2016 South Korean television series starring Lee Yu-ri (in a twin role), Seo Jun-young, Park Ha-na and Song Jong-ho. It airs on KBS2 on Mondays to Fridays at 19:50, for 102 episodes with the first episode airing on February 1, 2016.

== Plot ==
Na-yeon (Lee Yu-ri) is a bright woman. She supports her boyfriend Tae-joon (Seo Jun-young), who is from a poor background, and has even given up entering a university. But Tae-joon dumps her for his success and goes with Se-jin (Park Ha-na), who is the granddaughter of the Baekdo Company president. Do-hee (Lee Yu-ri) is Na-Yeon's twin sister, who was separated from her at birth. Hence, they have never met each other. Do-hee works as a reporter at a weekly magazine, and is the girlfriend of Hwi-kyung (Song Jong-ho), who is the successor of Baekdo Company, and Se-jin's step-uncle. After a series of events, Se-jin's family wrongfully placed Na-yeon in a mental hospital. Do-hee manages to track Na-yeon down, and they switch places. Shortly after, Do-hee dies in Na-yeon's place when the building catches fire. After her death, Na-yeon decides to take revenge. She takes on the identity of Do-hee, then marries Hwi-kyung, stepping into Se-jin's family in the process.

== Cast ==
=== Main cast ===
- Lee Yu-ri as Lee Na-yeon / Baek Do-hee (dual role) (32 years old)
  - Park Seo-yeon as young Lee Na-yeon / Baek Do-hee (12 years old)
- Seo Jun-young as Kang Tae-joon (32 years old)
  - Choi Min-young as young Kang Tae-joon (12 years old)
- Song Jong-ho as Park Hwi-kyung (35 years old)
  - Jang Do-yoon as young Park Hwi-kyung (15 years old)
- Park Ha-na as Jang Se-jin (32 years old)
  - Gong Yeon-sung as young Jang Se-jin (12 years old)

=== Supporting cast ===
Lee Na-yeon's family

- Yoon Bok-in as Yang Mal-sook
- Jo Hye-sun as Lee Eun-bong
  - Kim Esther as young Lee Eun-bong
- Han Ga-rim as Lee Geum-bong
  - Kim Min-kyul as young Lee Geum-bong
- Im Hyun-sung as Lee Joong-dae

Jang Se-jin's family

- Lee Jong-won as Jang Kyung-wan
- Kim Hye-ri as Park Yoo-kyung
- Kim Do-yeon as Yoon Young-sook
- Yoon Joo-sang as Park Man-jae

Kang Tae-joon's family

- Oh Young-shil as Oh Man-jung
- Song Young-kyu as Heo Poong-dal
- Kang Bong-sung as Heo Se-kwang

Baek Do-hee's family

- Kim Bo-mi as Ahn Sung-joo
- Park Chan-hwan as Baek Dong-jin

=== Others ===
- Kim Bo-min as Lee Sae-byul
- Yoon Byung-hee as Team leader Bae
- Lee Seol-goo as Park Joon-ik
- Hong Seung-bum as Park Hee-suk

=== Guest appearances ===
- Lee Yeon-soo as Lee Yoon-ae
- Yoon Da-hoon as Lee Ki-man

== Ratings ==
- The blue numbers represent the lowest ratings and the red numbers represent the highest ratings
- NR denotes that the drama did not rank in the top 20 daily programs on that date

Episode #	Original broadcast date	Average audience share			
Episode #	Original broadcast date	TNmS Ratings		Nielsen Korea	
Episode #	Original broadcast date	Nationwide	Seoul National Capital Area	Nationwide	Seoul National Capital Area
1	2016/02/01	17.6%	15.2%	15.7%	15.6%
2	2016/02/02	18.2%	16.3%	15.6%	14.8%
3	2016/02/03	16.4%	13.3%		12.8%
4	2016/02/04	17.5%	14.1%	15.0%	14.9%
5	2016/02/05	16.6%	14.5%	14.8%	14.7%
6	2016/02/08	10.6%	10.4%	8.2%	8.4%
7	2016/02/09	13.1%	11.8%	11.5%	10.8%
8	2016/02/10	13.6%	11.9%	12.2%	11.8%
9	2016/02/11	17.6%	15.5%	14.0%	13.6%
10	2016/02/12	16.3%	14.6%	14.5%	14.4%
11	2016/02/15	16.7%	14.3%	15.4%	15.3%
12	2016/02/16	17.6%	14.0%	15.7%	16.4%
13	2016/02/17	18.3%	15.6%	14.8%	15.1%
14	2016/02/18	18.4%	15.7%	15.8%	16.4%
15	2016/02/19	18.8%	16.0%	15.6%	14.8%
16	2016/02/22	17.6%	15.3%	15.8%	16.7%
17	2016/02/23	17.8%	16.2%	15.6%	
18	2016/02/24	18.2%	15.4%	15.8%	15.7%
19	2016/02/25	18.8%	16.1%	15.5%	16.1%
20	2016/02/26	19.2%	17.6%	16.6%	17.0%
21	2016/02/29	18.1%	15.8%	16.8%	17.7%
22	2016/03/01	20.5%	17.9%	18.0%	18.5%
23	2016/03/02	20.6%	16.6%	17.9%	18.6%
24	2016/03/03	18.6%	16.5%	16.8%	
25	2016/03/07	20.2%	18.1%	17.1%	17.4%
26	2016/03/08	20.8%	18.5%	17.8%	17.0%
27	2016/03/09	19.5%	16.7%	15.8%	15.4%
28	2016/03/10	18.9%	16.0%	15.8%	15.9%
29	2016/03/11	19.4%	16.1%	16.9%	
30	2016/03/14	19.7%	17.7%	18.4%	
31	2016/03/15	20.2%	17.4%	19.0%	19.4%
32	2016/03/16	19.4%	16.3%	17.7%	17.5%
33	2016/03/17	19.0%	15.8%	16.3%	16.0%
34	2016/03/18	19.0%	15.6%	17.6%	17.1%
35	2016/03/21	20.0%	17.1%	18.5%	19.2%
36	2016/03/22	21.5%	18.6%	18.5%	18.4%
37	2016/03/23	19.6%	16.7%	17.8%	17.4%
38	2016/03/24	18.1%	15.5%	17.0%	16.9%
39	2016/03/25	18.7%	17.2%	16.9%	15.9%
40	2016/03/28	20.1%	18.0%	17.0%	17.3%
41	2016/03/29	20.8%	18.0%	19.8%	19.0%
42	2016/03/30	21.3%	18.8%	19.1%	18.9%
43	2016/03/31	20.8%	17.7%	17.8%	18.1%
44	2016/04/04	21.1%	18.8%	19.6%	18.9%
45	2016/04/05	20.1%	17.5%	18.9%	17.9%
46	2016/04/06	20.1%	18.0%	18.2%	17.8%
47	2016/04/07	20.0%	17.2%	18.8%	19.2%
48	2016/04/08	19.7%	18.7%		18.8%
49	2016/04/11	21.0%	19.5%	17.6%	17.0%
50	2016/04/12	20.5%	18.7%	19.6%	18.8%
51	2016/04/13	16.3%	15.9%	16.4%	17.1%
52	2016/04/14	20.1%	17.6%	19.8%	19.5%
53	2016/04/15	18.5%	17.0%	18.1%	
54	2016/04/18	20.5%	19.2%	19.0%	19.4%
55	2016/04/19	19.5%	16.9%	20.0%	20.6%
56	2016/04/20	21.7%	18.9%	19.8%	19.9%
57	2016/04/21	19.2%	16.9%	17.9%	17.4%
58	2016/04/22	20.0%	17.3%	18.9%	18.4%
59	2016/04/25	20.7%	19.0%	19.0%	18.7%
60	2016/04/26	19.7%	16.9%	19.5%	19.2%
61	2016/04/27	20.4%	16.9%	18.5%	18.1%
62	2016/04/28	20.3%	18.2%	19.1%	19.3%
63	2016/04/29	21.0%	19.3%	17.9%	17.7%
64	2016/05/02	20.9%	20.4%	19.0%	19.1%
65	2016/05/03	20.8%	19.4%	20.1%	19.6%
66	2016/05/04	17.8%	16.5%	17.9%	17.8%
67	2016/05/05	17.9%	17.1%	16.7%	16.0%
68	2016/05/06	19.3%	17.5%	16.7%	15.8%
69	2016/05/09	20.3%	18.5%	19.3%	19.2%
70	2016/05/10	21.6%	19.1%	20.1%	18.9%
71	2016/05/11	19.6%	18.0%	17.6%	15.8%
72	2016/05/12	20.7%	18.3%	19.8%	19.0%
73	2016/05/13	19.9%	18.4%		18.0%
74	2016/05/16	21.0%	19.0%	18.9%	19.7%
75	2016/05/17	9.3%	8.7%	10.4%	10.6%
76	2016/05/18	20.0%	17.9%	17.1%	16.1%
77	2016/05/19	18.4%	16.4%	17.1%	
78	2016/05/20	19.7%	18.7%	16.7%	16.3%
79	2016/05/23	20.7%	18.9%	17.9%	17.8%
80	2015/05/24	20.8%	18.7%	19.0%	17.8%
81	2016/05/25	19.7%	18.5%	17.7%	
82	2016/05/26	20.9%	18.7%	20.4%	20.0%
83	2016/05/27	21.6%	19.0%	18.9%	18.1%
84	2016/05/30	19.5%	18.2%	19.3%	18.3%
85	2016/05/31	21.4%	19.5%	19.3%	18.4%
86	2016/06/01	18.8%	16.9%	18.7%	
87	2016/06/03	20.2%	17.7%	19.2%	18.9%
88	2016/06/06	9.8%	10.0%	9.2%	9.1%
89	2016/06/07	20.9%	19.6%	19.0%	18.3%
90	2016/06/08	18.7%	16.6%	17.1%	16.1%
91	2016/06/09	19.4%	18.7%	18.3%	17.9%
92	2016/06/10	20.4%	19.7%	19.2%	18.7%
93	2016/06/13	21.2%	20.9%	20.2%	20.0%
94	2016/06/14	19.6%	19.4%	19.1%	19.2%
95	2016/06/15	20.7%	19.5%	20.3%	20.4%
96	2016/06/16	20.2%	19.2%	20.1%	19.7%
97	2016/06/17	19.4%	18.6%	18.1%	17.4%
98	2016/06/20	22.3%	22.0%	21.3%	20.7%
99	2016/06/21	21.1%		20.4%	19.7%
100	2016/06/22	21.5%	20.7%	21.1%	21.1%
101	2016/06/23	21.4%	20.4%	20.5%	19.8%
102	2016/06/24	21.6%	21.4%	21.3%	20.8%
Average		19.25%	17.28%	17.57%	17.35%

- Episodes 78 aired on May 20, 2016

== Awards and nominations ==
Year	Award	Category	Recipient	Result
2016	30th KBS Drama Awards	Top Excellence Award, Actress	Lee Yu-ri	Nominated
2016	30th KBS Drama Awards	Excellence Award, Actor in a Daily Drama	Song Jong-ho	Nominated
2016	30th KBS Drama Awards	Excellence Award, Actress in a Daily Drama	Lee Yu-ri	Won
2016	30th KBS Drama Awards	Excellence Award, Actress in a Daily Drama	Park Ha-na	Nominated
2016	30th KBS Drama Awards	Best Young Actor	Choi Min-young	Nominated
2016	30th KBS Drama Awards	Best Young Actress	Kim Bo-min	Nominated
2016	30th KBS Drama Awards	Best Young Actress	Park Seo-yeon	Nominated
