= A Beautiful Mind (TV series) =

2016 South Korean television series

- Promotional poster
- Also known as: Dr. Frankenstein
- Hangul: 뷰티풀 마인드
- Lit.: Beautiful Mind
- RR: Byutipul maindeu
- MR: Pyut'ip'ul maindŭ
- Genre: Medical; Melodrama; Mystery
- Developed by: KBS Drama Division
- Written by: Kim Tae-hee
- Directed by: Mo Wan-il
- Starring: Jang Hyuk; Park So-dam; Yoon Hyun-min; Park Se-young; Huh Joon-ho
- Music by: Lee Chang Hee
- Country of origin: South Korea
- Original language: Korean
- No. of episodes: 14

Production
- Executive producers: Ji Byung-hyun; Kim Dong-rae
- Producers: Kim Jin-woo; Yoon Jae-hyuk
- Running time: 60 minutes
- Production company: Raemongraein Co. Ltd.

Original release
- Network: KBS2
- Release: June 20 – August 2, 2016

A Beautiful Mind (Korean: 뷰티풀 마인드) is a South Korean television series starring Jang Hyuk, Park So-dam, Yoon Hyun-min and Park Se-young. It aired from June 20 to August 8, 2016, on KBS2's Mondays and Tuesdays at 22:00 KST.

Though the drama had its supporters, its episode count was decreased from the initially planned 16 to 14 due to low viewership ratings.

== Synopsis ==
Inspired by Mary Shelley's gothic novel Frankenstein, A Beautiful Mind tells the story of a world-renowned but unsympathetic neurosurgeon, and his involvement with the mysterious deaths in the hospital he works in.

== Cast ==
=== Main ===
- Jang Hyuk as Lee Young-oh
  - Baek Su-ho as teenage Lee Young-oh.
  - Park Ha-joon as kid Lee Young-oh

A 36-year-old assistant professor at the department of neurology in Hyunsung Hospital. He is a genius neurosurgeon who is unable to feel empathy. He is daring and has impeccable observational, deductive and logical skills which he uses to make lightning quick diagnoses. He creates the illusion of an empathy he cannot feel through the reading of minute physiological cues.

- Park So-dam as Gye Jin-sung

A 26-year-old traffic policewoman who upholds onto her principles strongly. She is honest, straightforward and a stickler for rules.

- Yoon Hyun-min as Hyun Suk-joo

A 36-year-old cardio-thoracic surgeon who is popular among patients and highly trusted by his colleagues. He's ranked first for being the doctor that patients want to visit the most, the staff that colleagues want to work with the most, and also the senior that juniors want to take after.

- Park Se-young as Kim Min-jae

A 34-year-old senior research fellow at the department of neurology in Hyunsung Hospital. She graduated from a university at the countryside and came from a disadvantaged background. She is a lady of both intelligence and looks.

- Huh Joon-ho as Lee Gun-myung

The 58-year-old head of cardio cerebrovascular center in Hyunsung Hospital. He is impartial and treats all patients the same.

=== Supporting ===
- Kim Jong-soo as Shin Dong-jae – Director of Hyunsung Hospital. Treats Gye Jin-sung as a daughter.
- Oh Jung-se as Kang Hyun-joon – Director of Hyunsung Hospital Foundation. He comes from a rich family and is ambitious.
- Ryu Seung-soo as Kim Myung-soo – Three term assemblyman and aspiring presidential candidate.
- Gong Hyung-jin as No Seung-chan – Team leader of police crime division.
- Min Sung-wook as So Ji-yong – Doctor in department of neurosurgery.
- Lee Jae-ryong as Chae Soon-ho – Assistant Minister for Planning and Coordination, Cardiothoracic Department at Hyunsung Hospital.
- Shim Yi-young as Kim Yoon-kyung – Doctor in the department of anesthesiology, single mother raising a daughter on her own.
- Ha Jae-sook as Jang Moon-kyung – Nurse, pregnant.
- Kim Do-hyun as Kwon Duk-joong – Associate professor in the department of cardiology.
- Dong Ha as Yang Sung-eun – Third year resident.
- Jeon Sung-woo as Hong Kyung-soo – Fellow in the department of anesthesiology.
- Mori.U as Lee Hye-joo – Nurse.
- Jung Moon-sung as Hwang Jeong-hwan – Associate professor in the department of radiology.
- Jo Jae-wan as Oh Kyung-jin – Doctor in the department of neurosurgery.
- Jang Ki-yong as Nam Ho-young – Male nurse.
- Lee Sung-wook as Yoo Jang-bae – Doctor in the department of neurology.
- Jung Hee-tae as Park Soo-bum – Traffic police.
- Lee Si-won as Lee Si-hyun – Third year resident.
- Yeon Je-wook as Song Ki-ho – Research fellow in the department of thoracic-cardiovascular.
- Woo Jung-gook as Lee Kwang-bok – Technician in Hyunsung Medical Center.
- Yoo Jae-myung as Noh Seung-chan.
- Park Eun-hye as Shim Eun-ha – Pathologist (cameo, ep. 3–5).
- Kim Dae-gon as Kim-min
- Seo Jun-young as Lee Sang-joon – Patient (cameo, ep. 2 and 9).
- Son Jong-hak as Oh Young-bae – President of Green Pharmacy, ex-doctor of Hyunsung Medical Center.
- Jang Hyuk-Jin as Kim Soo-in – Reporter.
- Park Sun-chun as Gye Jin-sung's mother.
- Jo Byeong-kyu as Gye Jin-sung's brother.
- Lee Dong-kyu as Kang Chul-min – Traffic accident victim (Ep. 1).
- Ryu Tae-ho as Coroner Yang – Pathologist doing Kang Chul-min's autopsy (Ep. 1).
- Bang Dae-han as Dong-joon – Deaf son of Kang Chul-min (Ep. 1).
- Kim Beo-rae as Kang Il-do – Kang Hyun-joon's father.
- Heo Joon-suk as Hong Il-bum – Patient's father (Ep. 3).
- Baek Ji-won as Wife of glioblastoma patient (Ep. 6).
- Kang Eui-sik as Doctor in countryside clinic (Ep. 7).
- Kim Da-ye as a heart transplant patient (Ep. 7).
- Lee Jae-wook as Patient who refused to admit drinking alcohol after surgery (Ep. 9).
- Hwang Tae-kwang as Choi Sang-hyuk – TV anchorman (Ep. 10).
- Lee Do-hyun as Choi Yo-sub – Choi Sang-hyuk's son (Ep. 10).
- Lee Jae-woo as Jo Yoon-ho – Patient with Ewing's sarcoma in spine (Ep. 12–13).
- Seo Yoon-ah as Jo Yoon-ho's wife (Ep. 12–13).
- Won Ki-joon as Yum Kyun-ho – Cellist with tumor (Ep. 14).
- Yang Hee-myung as Detective Chun.
- Kim Hyun-sook as secretary.

== Original soundtrack ==
=== Part 1 ===
No.	Title	Artist	Length
1.	"Dirt (먼지)"	Bernard Park	3:46
2.	"Dirt (먼지)" (Inst.)		3:46
Total length:			7:32

=== Part 2 ===
No.	Title	Artist	Length
1.	"I'll Hold You (안아줄께)"	Nu Ri	4:15
2.	"I'll Hold You (안아줄께)" (Inst.)		4:15
Total length:			8:30

== Ratings ==
Ep.	Original broadcast date	Average audience share	
Ep.	Original broadcast date	TNmS	AGB Nielsen
Ep.	Original broadcast date	Nationwide	
1	June 20, 2016	4.5%	4.1%
2	June 21, 2016	4.3%	4.5%
3	June 27, 2016	4.8%	4.7%
4	June 28, 2016	4.0%	4.5%
5	July 4, 2016	4.1%	3.5%
6	July 5, 2016	4.0%	4.0%
7	July 11, 2016	3.7%	3.5%
8	July 12, 2016	3.5%	4.3%
9	July 18, 2016	3.8%	4.4%
10	July 19, 2016	4.0%	3.9%
11	July 25, 2016	3.2%	3.4%
12	July 26, 2016	3.7%	3.9%
13	August 1, 2016	2.0%	2.8%
14	August 2, 2016	2.6%	3.2%
Average		3.7%	3.9%
In this table, the blue numbers represent the lowest ratings and the red numbers represent the highest ratings.

== Awards and nominations ==
Year	Award	Category	Recipient	Result
2016	9th Korea Drama Awards	Best Screenplay	Kim Tae-hee	Nominated
2016	30th KBS Drama Awards	Excellence Award, Actor in a Miniseries	Jang Hyuk	Nominated
2016	30th KBS Drama Awards	Best New Actress	Park So-dam	Nominated
2016	30th KBS Drama Awards	Best Young Actor	Baek Seung-hwan	Nominated
