= So Yi-hyun =

South Korean actress (born 1984)

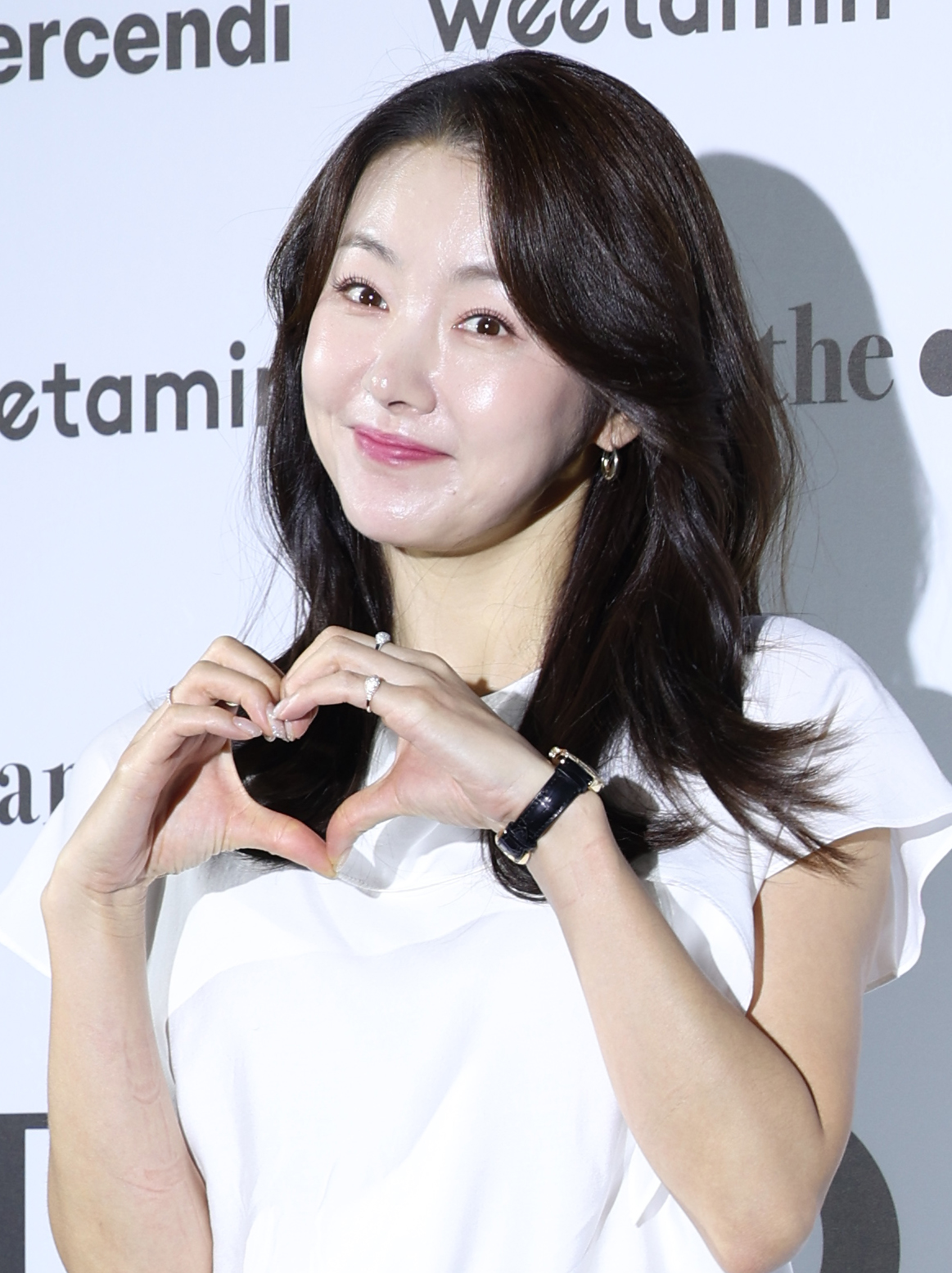
- So in 2026
- Born: Jo Woo-jung; August 28, 1984 (age 42); Jeonju, South Korea
- Other names: So E-hyun; Soh Yi-hyeon
- Education: University of Suwon - Theater and Film
- Occupation: Actress
- Years active: 2002–present
- Agent: Blitzway Entertainment
- Spouse: In Gyo-jin (m. 2014)
- Children: 2

Korean name
- Hangul: 조우정
- Hanja: 趙禑炡
- RR: Jo Ujeong
- MR: Cho Ujŏng

Stage name
- Hangul: 소이현
- RR: So Ihyeon
- MR: So Ihyŏn

So Yi-hyun (Korean: 소이현; born Jo Woo-jung, 조우정; August 28, 1984) is a South Korean actress, with starring and supporting roles in Hyena, Assorted Gems, Gloria, Heartstrings, Glowing She, Cheongdam-dong Alice, and Who Are You?.

== Personal life ==
=== Marriage and family ===
So married actor In Gyo-jin on October 4, 2014. So and In had been friends for a decade before dating; they were co-stars in Aeja's Older Sister, Minja (2008) and Happy Ending (2012). Their first child, a daughter, was born on December 4, 2015. In October 2017, she gave birth to a second daughter.

== Filmography ==
=== Television series ===
Year	Title	Role
2003	Yellow Handkerchief	Yoon Na-young
2003	Fairy and Swindler	Ji-na
2003	Punch	Oh Hae-mi
2004	April Kiss	Jang Jin-ah
2004	MBC Best Theater: "Where Are Arrows We Shoot?"	Hee-young
2005	Resurrection	Lee Kang-joo
2006	Special Crime Investigation: "Murder in the Blue House"	Park Hee-young
2006	Hyena	Lee Jung-yoon
2008	Before and After: Plastic Surgery Clinic	Hong Ki-nam
2008	Aeja's Older Sister, Minja	Lee Chae-rin
2009	Swallow the Sun	Yoo Mi-ran
2009	Assorted Gems	Gung Ryu-bi (Ruby)
2010	Gloria	Jung Yoon-seo
2011	Heartstrings	Jung Yoon-soo
2012	Glowing She	Jeon Ji-hyun
2012	Happy Ending	Park Na-young
2012	Cheongdam-dong Alice	Seo Yoon-joo
2013	I Can Hear Your Voice	Min Joon-gook's lawyer (cameo, episodes 1, 12)
2013	Who Are You?	Yang Shi-ohn
2014	Three Days	Lee Cha-young
2016	Secrets of Women	Kang Ji-yoo
2016	Entourage	Cameo
2016	The Sound of Your Heart	
2018	Fates & Furies	Cha Soo-hyun
2021	Red Shoes	Kim Gem-ma
2023	My Happy Ending	Kwon Yoon-jin
2026	Recipe for Love	Cha Se-ri

=== Film ===
Year	Title	Role
2004	Father and Son: The Story of Mencius	Choi Hyun-jung
2006	Dark Forest	Kim Jung-ah
2006	The Restless	Hyo
2013	Top Star	Mi-na

=== Variety shows ===
Year	Title	Notes/Ref.
2004–2005	Music Bank	MC
2011	It City: So Yi-hyun's Taste of Indochina	Travel
2013	Section TV	MC
2016–2017	The Return of Superman	Cast member with her daughter, In Ha-eun Eps 130–162, and 193
2018	Same Bed, Different Dreams 2: You Are My Destiny	Cast Member Eps 31–115
2021	Sister Shoots	Host
2022	Scance, not Hocance	Host
2023	Oh Eun-young Game	judge

=== Music video appearances ===
Year	Korean Title	English Title	Artist
2002	감기	"Cold"	Lee Ki-chan
2006	마지막 은영이에게	"To Eun-young, for the Last Time"	KCM
2006	태양의 눈물	"Tears of the Sun"	KCM

== Awards and nominations ==
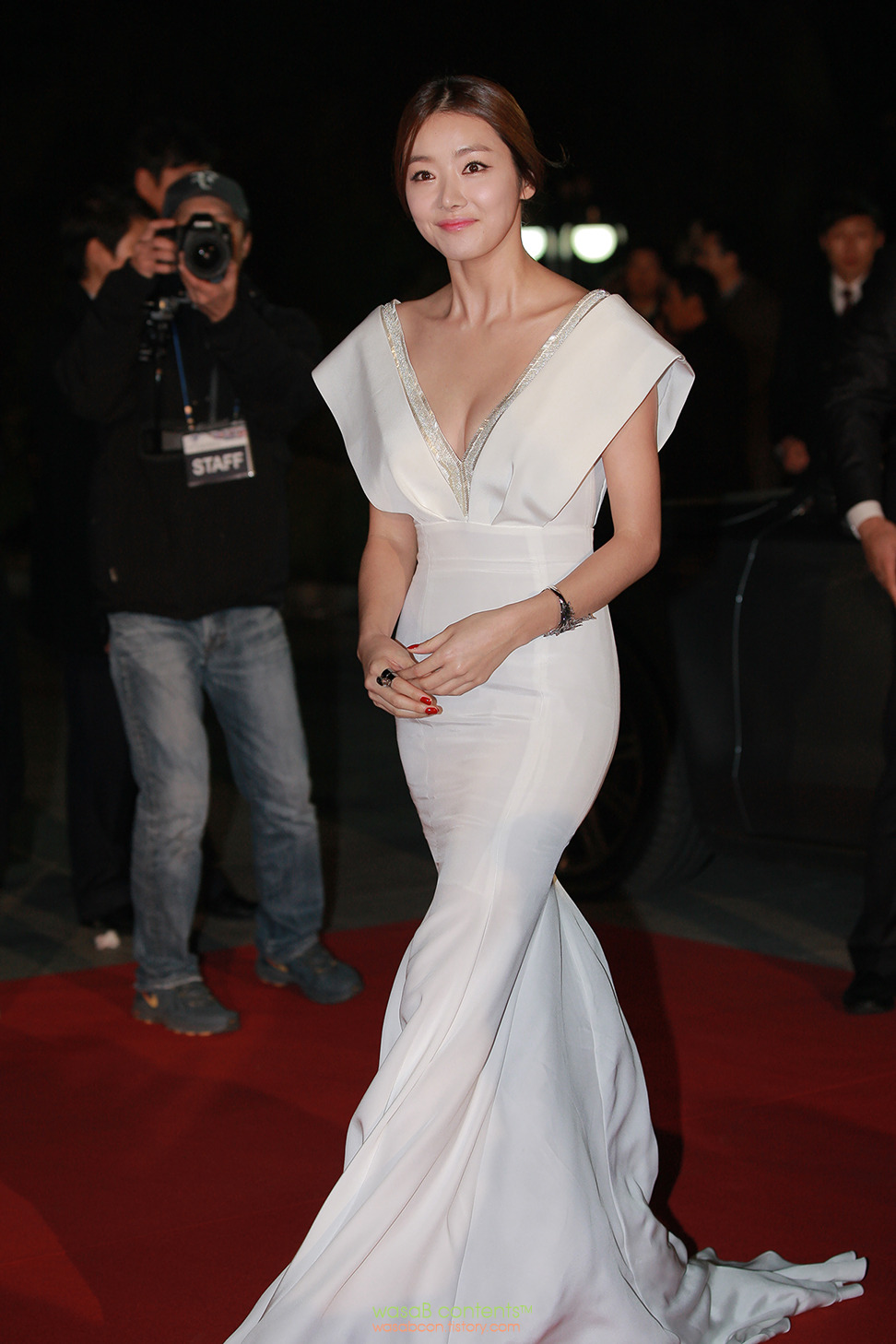
So at the 34th Blue Dragon Film Awards in 2013

Year	Award	Category	Nominated work	Result
2003	SBS Drama Awards	New Star Award	Punch	Won
2013	MBC Entertainment Awards	Excellence Award for Variety Shows, Female	Section TV	Won
2013	SBS Drama Awards	Excellence Award, Actress in a Miniseries	Cheongdam-dong Alice	Nominated
2014	SBS Drama Awards	Excellence Award, Actress in a Miniseries	Three Days	Won
2016	KBS Drama Awards	Excellence Award, Actress in a Daily Drama	Secrets of Women	Won
2019	SBS Drama Awards	Excellence Award, Actress in a Mid-length Drama	Fates & Furies	Nominated
2021	KBS Drama Awards	Excellence Award, Actress in a Daily Drama	Red shoes	Won
2022	8th APAN Star Awards	Excellence Award, Actress in a Serial Drama	Red shoes	Won
