= Choco Bank =

- Promotional Poster
- Genre: Web series Drama; Comedy; Romance; Business
- Written by: Woo Su-jin
- Directed by: Kim Yun-ji
- Starring: Kim Jong-in; Park Eun-bin
- Theme music composer: Kim Jang-woo
- Country of origin: South Korea
- Original language: Korean
- No. of episodes: 6

Production
- Producer: Jung Jung-hwa
- Running time: 14 mins Monday – Friday 10:00 am
- Production company: Cheil Worldwide Inc.

Original release
- Network: Naver TV Cast; YouTube
- Release: February 15 – February 21, 2016

Choco Bank (Korean: 초코 뱅크) is a South Korean web series created by Cheil Worldwide Inc. for the Financial Services Commission (FSC). It consists of six episodes about the financial management of start up businesses. The web drama recorded 2,519,849 views in the week of February 15 to February 21, 2016, according to cons TV.

== Background ==
Choco Bank is about a man named Kim Eun-haeng (Kim Jong-in), a college graduate entering the workforce. His father made sure he had a lucky start in life by giving him a name that means "bank" in Korean. He will deal with the concerns with which many in their 20s struggle when they start working for the first time. He was unemployed for five years. He later meets a girl named Ha Cho-co (Park Eun-bin) who is preparing to start a business. The story plays out as the two find out more about the financial service industry.

== Cast ==
- Kim Jong-in as Kim Eun-haeng
- Park Eun-bin as Ha Cho-co / Byun Mal-nyeon
  - Park Seo-yeon as young Mal-nyeon
- Yeon Joon-seok as Bae Dal-soo
  - Choi Min-young as young Dal-soo
- Lee Il-hwa as Eun-haeng's mother
- Lee Chae-won as Hong Chae-ri
- Kim Young-hee as Cho-co's landlord
- Kim Sook as Worker at Financial Bank

== Original soundtracks ==
Track listing
No.	Title	Artist	Length
1.	"Pounding Love"	CLC	3:58
2.	"Pounding Love" (Inst.)	CLC	3:58
3.	"You're Sweet"	Vanilla Man (Vanilla Acoustic) feat. Joo Ye In	3:07
4.	"A Walk"	Han All	3:02
5.	"I'll Cry"	Kim Ji-soo	3:21

== Awards and nominations ==
Year	Award	Category	Recipient	Result
2017	12th Soompi Awards	Best Web Series	Choco Bank	Nominated
