= Yoo Hae-jung =

South Korean actress (born 2000)

- Born: October 9, 2000 (age 26); South Korea
- Occupation: Actress
- Years active: 2006–present
- Agent: Broomstick

Korean name
- Hangul: 유해정
- RR: Yu Haejeong
- MR: Yu Haejŏng

Yoo Hae-jung (Korean: 유해정; born October 9, 2000) is a South Korean actress.

== Filmography ==
=== Television series ===
Year	Title	Role	Network
2007	Delicious Stories		SBS
2008	On Air		SBS
2008	UCIS: Unsolved Crime Investigation Service		MBC Dramanet
2008	Here He Comes		MBC
2009	High Kick Through the Roof		MBC
2010	Quiz of God 1	Eun-ok	OCN
2013	Good Doctor	Eun-ok	KBS2
2013	The Eldest	young Kim Young-sun	jTBC
2016	Becky's Back	Hong Bo-Reum	KBS2

=== Film ===
Year	Title	Role
2011	Lovable	Da-seul
2014	Guardian	Hee-jung

== Awards and nominations ==
Year	Award	Category	Nominated work	Result
2012	11th Asian Film Festival of Dallas	Special Jury Prize for Acting	Lovable	Won
2012	49th Grand Bell Awards	Best New Actress	Lovable	Nominated
