= On the Way to the Airport =

2016 South Korean television series

- Promotional poster
- Also known as: Road to the Airport
- Hangul: 공항가는 길
- RR: Gonghangganeun gil
- MR: Konghangganŭn kil
- Genre: Romance; Melodrama
- Created by: KBS Drama Production
- Written by: Lee Sook-yeon
- Directed by: Kim Cheol-kyu
- Creative directors: Yoo Ho-joon; Kwak Jung-hoo; Kim Jung-uk
- Starring: Kim Ha-neul; Lee Sang-yoon; Shin Sung-rok; Choi Yeo-jin; Jang Hee-jin
- Composer: Lee Im-woo
- Country of origin: South Korea
- Original language: Korean
- No. of episodes: 16

Production
- Executive producers: Kang Byung-taek; Jinnie Jin-hee Choi; Park Ji-young
- Producers: No Sang-hoon; Lee Young-bum
- Production locations: South Korea; Malaysia
- Editors: Lee Young-seop; Lee Yoon-jung
- Camera setup: Single-camera
- Running time: 60 minutes
- Production company: Studio Dragon (Note: Studio Dragon is CJ E&M's drama production subsidiary founded in May 2016. On the Way to the Airport is the first series produced by the company for a free-to-air, public and/or terrestrial broadcast network.)

Original release
- Network: KBS2
- Release: September 21 – November 10, 2016

On the Way to the Airport (Korean: 공항가는 길) is a South Korean television series starring Kim Ha-neul, Lee Sang-yoon, Shin Sung-rok, Choi Yeo-jin, and Jang Hee-jin, about married individuals who meet by fate and become more involved in each other's lives. It aired on KBS2 from September 21 to November 10, 2016, every Wednesday and Thursday at 22:00 (KST) for 16 episodes.

== Synopsis ==
Choi Soo-ah (Kim Ha-neul) is an experienced AirAsia stewardess who is married to Park Jin-seok (Shin Sung-rok), a pilot who dominates every aspect of her and their daughter Park Hyo-eun's (Kim Hwan-hee) life. Despite the protest, Jin-seok sends Hyo-eun to an international school in Malaysia where she meets Annie Seo/Seo Eun-woo, Seo Do-woo's (Lee Sang-yoon) daughter. Tragedy strikes when Annie dies while attempting to return home, and despite their initial denial, Soo-ah and Do-woo's lives become intertwined.

== Cast ==
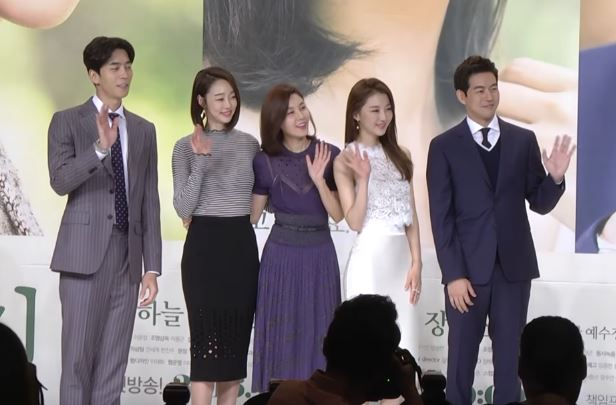
Main cast at the press conference

=== Main ===
- Kim Ha-neul as Choi Soo-ah, a twelve-year veteran flight attendant.
- Lee Sang-yoon as Seo Do-woo, a part-time university lecturer in architecture.
- Shin Sung-rok as Park Jin-seok, a pilot and Soo-ah's husband.
- Choi Yeo-jin as Song Mi-jin.
- Jang Hee-jin as Kim Hye-won, Do-woo's wife.

=== Supporting ===
==== Soo-ah's family ====
- Kim Hwan-hee as Park Hyo-eun, Soo-ah and Jin-seok's daughter.
- Kim Kwon as Choi Je-ah.
- Lee Young-ran as Kim Young-sook.

==== Do-woo's family ====
- Ye Soo-jung as Go Eun-hee.
- Park Seo-yeon as Annie Seo / Seo Eun-woo.
- Son Jong-hak as Min-seok.

==== People around Soo-ah ====
- Oh Ji-hye as Mary.
- Seo Cho-won as Supporting.
- Ha Jae-sook as Lee Hyeon-joo.

==== People around Do-woo ====
- Choi Song-hyun as Han Ji-eun.
- Park Gyeong-ree as Kim-yeong
- Jay Kim as Jang Hyun-woo.
- Jo Kyung-sook as Hong Kyung-ja.
- Kim Sa-hee as Hwang Hyun-jeong.
- Song Yoo-hyun as Choi Kyung-sook.

==== Airline staff ====
- Jung Yeon-joo as Kang Eun-joo.
- Lee Jung-hyuk as Park Sang-hyeop.
- Kim Sung-hoon as Park Chang-hoon.
- Kim Tae-hyung as Kevin Oh.
- Park Seon-im as Kim Joo-hyun.
- Na Hye-jin as Yang Hye-jin.
- Choi Seo-yeon as Lee Seon-young.

==== Others ====
- Park Min-jung as Ms. Kim

== Original soundtrack ==
On the Way to the Airport OST

Soundtrack album by Various artists
- Recorded: 2016
- Genre: Soundtrack
- Languages: Korean; English
- Labels: CJ E&M; Friends.Net

=== Part 1 ===
Released on October 4, 2016
No.	Title	Artist	Length
1.	"Only you" (이방인)	Morra	3:48

=== Part 2 ===
Released on October 6, 2016
No.	Title	Artist	Length
1.	"Would that be Alright?" (이방인)	LeeSa	4:06

=== Part 3 ===
Released on October 19, 2016
No.	Title	Artist	Length
1.	"For Nothing" (이방인)	Han Hee-jun	2:50

=== Part 4 ===
Released on October 26, 2016
No.	Title	Artist	Length
1.	"City Sunset" (이방인)	Sunwoo Jung-a	4:39

=== Part 5 ===
Released on November 2, 2016
No.	Title	Artist	Length
1.	"Knot" (이방인)	The Ray	3:58

Disc 2:
No.	Title	Artist	Length
1.	"On the way to the Airport" (Opening Title)	Various Artists	1:50
2.	"Autmn sky"	Various Artists	2:11
3.	"In the Memories"	Various Artists	3:01
4.	"Love is coming"	Various Artists	2:51
5.	"Obscured Love"	Various Artists	3:05
6.	"Persona Solitario"	Various Artists	2:47
7.	"Separate the wind"	Various Artists	2:31
8.	"Sad memories"	Various Artists	3:41
9.	"Soo Ah's love song"	Various Artists	2:55
10.	"You and Me"	Various Artists	2:04

== Ratings ==
Ep.	Original broadcast date	Average audience share			
Ep.	Original broadcast date	TNmS		Nielsen Korea	
Ep.	Original broadcast date	Nationwide	Seoul	Nationwide	Seoul
1	September 21, 2016	8.5% (15th)	9.6% (8th)	7.4% (18th)	7.4% (18th)
2	September 22, 2016	7.1% (NR)	7.5% (NR)	7.5% (19th)	7.9% (15th)
3	September 28, 2016	7.6% (19th)	8.1% (13th)	9.0% (13th)	9.3% (11th)
4	September 29, 2016	8.1% (19th)	9.3% (10th)	8.3% (15th)	8.4% (13th)
5	October 5, 2016	6.6% (NR)	6.1% (NR)	7.5% (NR)	7.8% (15th)
6	October 6, 2016	7.1% (NR)	7.4% (20th)	9.1% (10th)	9.9% (7th)
7	October 12, 2016	6.9% (20th)	6.8% (20th)	8.5% (14th)	8.8% (11th)
8	October 13, 2016	6.8% (NR)	6.8% (NR)	7.4% (19th)	8.1% (15th)
9	October 19, 2016	6.6% (NR)	6.8% (NR)	7.8% (18th)	8.1% (15th)
10	October 20, 2016	6.8% (NR)	7.4% (NR)	8.1% (16th)	8.7% (14th)
11	October 26, 2016	7.1% (NR)	6.7% (19th)	8.8% (13th)	10.1% (9th)
12	October 27, 2016	7.2% (19th)	7.2% (19th)	9.3% (9th)	9.8% (9th)
13	November 2, 2016	6.7% (20th)	7.4% (NR)	8.5% (13th)	9.2% (9th)
14	November 3, 2016	6.5% (NR)	6.5% (NR)	9.1% (11th)	9.4% (10th)
15	November 9, 2016	6.1% (NR)	6.8% (19th)	8.1% (18th)	8.9% (11th)
16	November 10, 2016	6.5% (NR)	6.1% (NR)	9.3% (11th)	9.8% (9th)
Average		7.0%	7.3%	8.4%	8.9%
In the table above, the blue numbers represent the lowest ratings and the red numbers represent the highest ratings.; NR denotes that the drama did not rank in the top 20 daily programs on that date.

== Awards and nominations ==
Year	Award	Category	Recipient	Result
2016	30th KBS Drama Awards	Top Excellence Award, Actor	Lee Sang-yoon	Nominated
2016	30th KBS Drama Awards	Top Excellence Award, Actress	Kim Ha-neul	Won
2016	30th KBS Drama Awards	Excellence Award, Actor in a Miniseries	Lee Sang-yoon	Won
2016	30th KBS Drama Awards	Excellence Award, Actress in a Miniseries	Kim Ha-neul	Nominated
2016	30th KBS Drama Awards	Best Young Actress	Kim Hwan-hee	Nominated
2016	30th KBS Drama Awards	Best Young Actress	Park Seo-yeon	Nominated
2016	30th KBS Drama Awards	Best Couple Award	Kim Ha-neul and Lee Sang-yoon	Won
2017	53rd Paeksang Arts Awards	Best Actress (TV)	Kim Ha-neul	Nominated
