= Baek Su-ho =

South Korean actor

- Born: Baek Seung-hwan; April 17, 1998 (age 28); South Korea
- Education: Sungkyunkwan University (Department of Design)
- Occupation: Actor
- Years active: 2007–present
- Agent: Sangyoung ENT

Korean name
- Hangul: 백승환
- Hanja: 白承煥
- RR: Baek Seunghwan
- MR: Paek Sŭnghwan

Stage name
- Hangul: 백수호
- Hanja: 白守護
- RR: Baek Suho
- MR: Paek Suho

Baek Su-ho (Korean: 백수호; born Baek Seung-hwan on April 17, 1998) is a South Korean actor. He began his career as a child actor.

== Filmography ==
=== Films ===
Year	Title	Role
2007	Wide Awake	Na Sang-woo
2009	Goodbye Mom	Min-suk (young)
2011	Silenced	Jeon Min-soo
2013	South Bound	Choi Na-ra
2014	Confession	Im Hyun-tae (young)

=== Television series ===
Year	Title	Role
2008	Takdeok Choi Yang-eop	Gae-ttong's son
2011	Deep Rooted Tree	Yoon Pyung (young)
2011	Me Too, Flower!	Seo Jae-hee (young)
2011	Insu, the Queen Mother	Yoon Goo (young)
2012	I Love Lee Taly	Geum Eun-dong (young)
2013	Jang Ok-jung, Living by Love	Hyun Chi-soo (young)
2015	The Jingbirok: A Memoir of Imjin War	Lee Yeon (young)
2015	Blood	Park Ji-sang (young)
2015	Six Flying Dragons	Moo-hyul (young)
2016	A Beautiful Mind	Lee Young-oh (young)
2017	Queen for Seven Days	Lee Yeok (young)
2019	Different Dreams	Majar
2019	Everything and Nothing	Kang Ki-hyun
2026	The Scarecrow	Im Seok-man

=== Music video appearances ===
Year	Song title	Artist
2012	"Legend of Tears"	Hi.ni

== Awards and nominations ==
Year	Award	Category	Nominated work	Result
2016	30th KBS Drama Awards	Best Young Actor	A Beautiful Mind	Nominated
2017	31st KBS Drama Awards	Best Young Actor	Queen for Seven Days	Nominated
