= Will It Snow for Christmas? =

2009–2010 South Korean television series

- Promotional poster
- Hangul: 크리스마스에 눈이 올까요?
- Lit.: Will it snow on Christmas?
- RR: Keuriseumaseue nuni olkkayo?
- MR: K'ŭrisŭmasŭe nuni olkkayo?
- Written by: Lee Kyung-hee
- Directed by: Choi Moon-suk
- Starring: Go Soo; Han Ye-seul; Song Jong-ho; Sunwoo Sun
- Country of origin: South Korea
- No. of episodes: 16

Production
- Production company: SidusHQ

Original release
- Network: Seoul Broadcasting System
- Release: December 2, 2009 – January 28, 2010

Will It Snow for Christmas? (Korean: 크리스마스에 눈이 올까요?; RR: Keuriseumaseue nuni olkkayo?) is a South Korean television melodrama series starring Go Soo, Han Ye-seul, Song Jong-ho, Sunwoo Sun, and Jo Min-su. It aired on SBS from December 2, 2009 to January 28, 2010 on Wednesdays and Thursdays at 21:55 for 16 episodes.

== Synopsis ==
Han Ji-wan (Han Ye-seul), a cheerful and meddlesome girl, and Cha Kang-jin (Go Soo), the son of a bar hostess, meet as teenagers and are drawn to each other despite frequent clashes. After a tragedy tears them apart, they meet again as adults years later.

== Cast ==
- Go Soo as Cha Kang-jin
  - Kim Soo-hyun as teenage Kang-jin
- Han Ye-seul as Han Ji-wan
  - Nam Ji-hyun as teenage Ji-wan
- Song Jong-ho as Park Tae-joon
- Sunwoo Sun as Lee Woo-jung
- Jo Min-su as Cha Chun-hee (Kang-jin's mother)
- Chun Ho-jin as Han Joon-soo
- Kim Do-yeon as Seo Young-sook
- Song Joong-ki as Han Ji-yong (Ji-wan's older brother)
- Kim Ki-bang as Cha Bu-san (Kang-jin's younger brother)
  - Seo Jae-wook as teenage Bu-san
- Seok Jin-yi as Lee Jin-kyung
  - Yang So-young as teenage Jin-kyung
- Kim Kwang-min as Seo Jae-hyun
- Kim Joon-hyung as Kyung-soo
- Min Ji-young as Miss Sun
- Kim In-tae as Noh Gyo-soo
- Kim Hyung-bum as Kim Jung-pil
- Yeo Min-joo as Song Yoon-joo
- Do Ji-han as Park Jong-suk
- Baek Seung-hyeon
- Kim Kwang-kyu as Kang-jin's homeroom teacher

== Production and broadcast ==
The series marked Go Soo's return to television after four years. It was sold to Japan before its premiere, and its first episode drew praise for the performances of its child actors. It began airing in Japan in April 2010 on KNTV.

== Ratings ==
According to TNS Media Korea, episodes one and two achieved a rating of 8.6% and 7.7% nationwide and ranked second against its rivals Iris on KBS and Hero on MBC. The ratings of the rerun for episodes one and two, however, were recorded to be 8.7% and 11.4% nationwide, surpassing its original broadcast.

Date	Episode	Nationwide	Seoul Area
2009-12-02	1	8.6% (21st)	9.0% (20th)
2009-12-03	2	7.7% (24th)	(<8.7%)
2009-12-09	3	7.2% (27th)	(<8.2%)
2009-12-10	4	7.8% (19th)	7.5% (20th)
2009-12-16	5	9.9% (16th)	10.3% (14th)
2009-12-17	6	9.4% (16th)	9.5% (15th)
2009-12-23	7	16.4% (5th)	16.7% (4th)
2009-12-24	8	15.6% (4th)	16.0% (4th)
2010-01-06	9	14.5% (8th)	14.5% (7th)
2010-01-07	10	12.7% (10th)	12.5% (11th)
2010-01-13	11	10.8% (15th)	10.1% (16th)
2010-01-14	12	11.5% (12th)	11.8% (11th)
2010-01-20	13	9.7% (18th)	9.8% (16th)
2010-01-21	14	10.7% (12th)	10.1% (13th)
2010-01-27	15	9.1% (19th)	8.9% (19th)
2010-01-28	16	10.9% (11th)	10.8% (11th)
Average		10.8%	-

Source: TNS Media Korea

== See also ==
- List of Christmas films
