= Lucky Romance =

2016 South Korean television series

- Hangul: 운빨로맨스
- RR: Unppal romaenseu
- MR: Unppal romaensŭ
- Genre: Romance; Comedy; Workplace
- Based on: Lucky Romance by Kim Dal-nim
- Written by: Choi Yoon-gyo
- Directed by: Kim Kyung-hee
- Starring: Hwang Jung-eum; Ryu Jun-yeol; Lee Soo-hyuk; Lee Chung-ah
- Country of origin: South Korea
- Original language: Korean
- No. of episodes: 16

Production
- Executive producer: Kim Do-hoon
- Producers: Sim Jung-woon; Bae Jeong-hoon
- Running time: 70 minutes
- Production company: H. Brothers C&M

Original release
- Network: MBC TV
- Release: May 25 – July 14, 2016

Lucky Romance (Korean: 운빨로맨스) is a 2016 South Korean television series based on the webtoon of the same name published in 2014 on Naver, starring Hwang Jung-eum and Ryu Jun-yeol. It aired on MBC TV's Wednesdays and Thursdays at 22:00 (KST) timeslot from May 25 to July 14, 2016.

== Synopsis ==
The drama centers on the romantic and comedic interactions between Shim Bo-nui, a woman who has blind faith in superstitions and fortune-tellings, with Je Soo-ho, CEO of a Game developer company who is a scientific and logical man.

== Cast ==
=== Main ===
- Hwang Jung-eum as Shim Bo-nui
  - Lee Ye-seon as child Bo-nui
  - Park Seo-yeon as young Bo-nui

A 26-year-old, attractive woman, who can learn quickly. On the other hand, she is blindly superstitious. She always follows the fortune-tellings of shaman Goo Shin, because she is told she was born unlucky. The shaman tells her that in order to save her sister Bo-ra, she has to sleep with a man born in the year of the Tiger. She meets Je Soo-ho and coincidentally he was born a Tiger.

- Ryu Jun-yeol as Je Soo-ho
  - Gil Jeong-woo as child Soo-ho
  - Seol Woo-hyung as young Soo-ho

A 31-year-old man. Born as a genius, he is a very logical and scientific person, who does not believe in anything supernatural. He is the owner and also CEO of a game developer company, Zeze Factory. He meets Bo-nui, who asks him to sleep with her.

- Lee Soo-hyuk as Choi Geon-wook / Gary Choi
  - Hong Dong-young as young Geon-wook

A 24-year-old man. A Korean with Canadian citizenship. He is a famous professional tennis player, always placed high in ATP rankings. When he returns to South Korea, he immediately searches for his first love Bo-nui. He has a strained relationship with his father.

- Lee Chung-ah as Han Seol-hee / Amy Han

A 34-year-old woman. The director of a big sport company that represents Gun-wook. She is Soo-ho's first love. Ever since she lost her older brother in a fire accident, she never shows her true feelings to anyone, and always strives to be perfect in everyone's eyes.

=== Supporting ===
People around Shim Bo-nui

- Kim Ji-min as Shim Bo-ra
  - Kim Bo-min as young Bo-ra
- Kim Jong-goo as Goo Shin
- Kim Sang-ho as Won Dae-hae

People around Je Soo-ho

- Jung Sang-hoon as Han Ryang-ha
- Gi Ju-bong as Je Mool-po
- Na Young-hee as Yang Hee-ae
- Jung In-gi as Ahn Young-il

People around Choi Geon-wook

- Jo Young-jin as Choi Ho

Zeze Factory

- Lee Cho-hee as Lee Dal-nim
- Jung Young-gi as Song Dae-gwon
- Yoon Bong-gil as Lee Hyun-bin
- Jin Hyuk as Ryu Ji-hoon
- Cha Se-young as Ga Seung-hyun
- Kwon Hyuk-soo as Jo Yoon-bal

Extended cast

- Jo Seon-mook
- Song Kyung-hwa
- Jo Shi-nae
- Baek Ji-won
- Oh Hee-joon

=== Cameo appearances ===
- Kim Young-hee
- Ray Yang
- Park Sung-kwang
- Heo Kyung-hwan

== Original soundtrack ==
Lucky Romance Original Soundtrack

Soundtrack album by Various Artists
- Released: July 14, 2016 (digital); August 3, 2016 (CD)
- Genre: Soundtrack
- Labels: H. Brothers/LOEN; L200001279
- Producer: Sim Jung-woon (executive)

=== OST Part 1 ===
No.	Title	Artist	Length
1.	"찌릿찌릿" (Tingle)	Kei from Lovelyz	2:20

=== OST Part 2 ===
No.	Title	Artist	Length
1.	"슬픈인연" (Sad Fate)	Park Hye-soo	4:03

=== OST Part 3 ===
No.	Title	Artist	Length
1.	"내게 말해줘" (Tell Me)	Soyou from Sistar	4:00

=== OST Part 4 ===
No.	Title	Artist	Length
1.	"샤랄라 로맨스" (Shalala Romance)	Dawon from Cosmic Girls	3:29

=== OST Part 5 ===
No.	Title	Artist	Length
1.	"진심을 너에게" (Sincerely To You)	Sweetpea	3:32

=== OST Part 6 ===
No.	Title	Artist	Length
1.	"내게 기대" (Lean On Me)	(XIA) Junsu	3:57

=== OST Part 7 ===
No.	Title	Artist	Length
1.	"그 누구보다" (More Than Anyone)	Taeyoon	5:11

== Ratings ==
Ep.	Original broadcast date	Average audience share			
Ep.	Original broadcast date	TNmS		Nielsen Korea	
Ep.	Original broadcast date	Nationwide	Seoul	Nationwide	Seoul
1	May 25, 2016	8.9%	10.4%	10.3%	12.3%
2	May 26, 2016	7.0%	8.0%	8.7%	10.1%
3	June 1, 2016	7.6%	7.8%	8.0%	8.0%
4	June 2, 2016	7.9%	9.0%	8.2%	8.9%
5	June 8, 2016	8.0%	9.9%	8.4%	9.2%
6	June 9, 2016	8.1%	9.6%	8.9%	9.8%
7	June 15, 2016	8.1%	10.0%	9.8%	10.3%
8	June 16, 2016	8.5%	10.0%	8.7%	9.6%
9	June 22, 2016	8.6%	11.0%	9.2%	10.0%
10	June 23, 2016	7.9%	10.2%	8.0%	9.1%
11	June 29, 2016	8.2%	10.1%	8.4%	9.7%
12	June 30, 2016	7.7%	9.3%	7.7%	8.0%
13	July 6, 2016	7.0%	9.5%	6.6%	6.7
14	July 7, 2016	6.8%	8.4%	6.4%	7.0
15	July 13, 2016	7.0%	8.5%	6.8%	7.0%
16	July 14, 2016	7.2%	9.1%	6.4%	6.8
Average		7.78%	9.43%	8.17%	8.9%
In the table above, the blue numbers represent the lowest ratings and the red numbers represent the highest ratings.

== Awards and nominations ==
Year	Award	Category	Recipient	Result
2016	9th Korea Drama Awards	Excellence Award, Actress	Hwang Jung-eum	Nominated
2016	9th Korea Drama Awards	Best Original Soundtrack	"내게 말해줘" by Soyou	Nominated
2016	36th MBC Drama Awards	Top Excellence Award, Actor in a Miniseries	Ryu Jun-yeol	Nominated
2016	36th MBC Drama Awards	Best New Actor	Ryu Jun-yeol	Won
2016	36th MBC Drama Awards	Top Excellence Award, Actress in a Miniseries	Hwang Jung-eum	Nominated
2016	36th MBC Drama Awards	Excellence Award, Actress in a Miniseries	Lee Chung-ah	Nominated
