= Song Jong-ho =

South Korean actor (born 1976)

- Born: October 5, 1976 (age 50); Seoul, South Korea
- Education: Pyeongtaek University - Computer Statistics
- Occupation: Actor
- Years active: 1995–present
- Agent: Blossom Entertainment

Korean name
- Hangul: 송종호
- Hanja: 宋鍾鎬
- RR: Song Jongho
- MR: Song Chongho

Song Jong-ho (Korean: 송종호; born October 5, 1976) is a South Korean actor. Song debuted as a runway model in Park Byung-chul's fashion show in 1995. His print and runway modeling career lasted until 1999, when he turned to acting. He is best known for his roles in Will It Snow for Christmas? (2009), The Princess' Man (2011), and Reply 1997 (2012).

== Career ==
Song Jong-ho majored in Computer Statistics at Pyeongtaek University, but he soon realized that his true passion lay in entertainment. In 1995, he made his debut as a model in a fashion show of designer Park Byung-chul. Song's print and runway modeling career lasted until 1999, when he turned to acting. Song first appeared in sitcoms and television dramas in minor and supporting roles.

In 2007, he drew notice as a surgical intern in the medical drama Surgeon Bong Dal-hee, for which he received a New Star Award at the SBS Drama Awards. Another notable role followed in the 2009 melodrama Will It Snow for Christmas?, as a penniless man whose family went bankrupt during the IMF crisis, and thus feels conflicted about falling for an heiress. Song said he cried when he first read Lee Kyung-hee's script, describing it as "so entertaining and sad and it had a lot of great lines," that he begged his manager to get him cast in the drama.

In 2011, Song's profile rose further when he starred in The Princess' Man, a period drama set in the Joseon period which drew both high ratings and critical acclaim. In it, he played a nobleman fallen on hard times who betrays his best friend in order to possess the woman he loves and achieve his ambition. This was followed by the popular Reply 1997, a nostalgic cable drama in which Song played a warm-hearted computer genius-turned-politician loosely based on Ahn Cheol-soo, and was part of the show's central love triangle.

Song returned to the Joseon era in his next two projects. He made his big screen debut in The Grand Heist (2012), an ensemble heist comedy about a group of quirky professionals who attempt to steal ice (a valuable commodity at the time) from the royal storage. Then in The Fugitive of Joseon (2013), Song portrayed an uigeumbu, an intelligent and tenacious investigator hunting down the protagonist until he becomes convinced of the latter's innocence and they join forces.

He then made guest appearances on The Suspicious Housekeeper (as a stalker) and Beyond the Clouds (as the heroine's fiancé whose death early in the drama serves as a catalyst). Not long after, Song headlined The Reason I'm Getting Married, which was featured on the single-episode anthology, KBS Drama Special.

== Filmography ==
=== Television series ===
Year	Title	Role	Network
1999	Invitation		KBS2
1999	Jump		MBC
1999	March		SBS
2001	Nonstop 2		MBC
2003	Thousand Years of Love		SBS
2004	First Love of a Royal Prince	Yoon-joon	MBC
2007	Surgeon Bong Dal-hee	Lee Min-woo	SBS
2007	Golden Bride	Kim Young-min	SBS
2008	Tazza	Ahn Se-hoon	SBS
2008	My Life's Golden Age		MBC
2009	Cain and Abel	Kang Suk-hoon	SBS
2009	Will It Snow for Christmas?	Park Tae-joon	SBS
2010	Three Sisters	Lee Min-woo	SBS
2011	The Princess' Man	Shin Myeon	KBS2
2012	Reply 1997	Yoon Tae-woong	tvN
2012	KBS Drama Special: "The Flight of the Spoonbill"	Kyeong-ho	KBS2
2013	The Fugitive of Joseon	Lee Jung-hwan	KBS2
2013	The Suspicious Housekeeper	Jang Do-hyung/Seo Ji-hoon	SBS
2014	Beyond the Clouds	Gong Woo-jin (cameo)	KBS2
2014	KBS Drama Special: "The Reason I'm Getting Married"	Han Seung-wook	KBS2
2014	Dr. Frost	Moon Sung-hyun/Park Dong-hee	OCN
2015	A Girl Who Sees Smells	Chun Baek-kyung	SBS
2015	Orange Marmalade	Han Yoon-jae	KBS2
2015	All About My Mom	Yoon Sang-hyuk	KBS2
2015	Cheo Yong 2	Nam Hui-jun	OCN
2016	The Promise	Park Hwi-kyung	KBS2
2016	The Royal Gambler	Kim Yi-soo (Cameo)	SBS
2017	A Korean Odyssey	Kang Dae-sung	tvN
2017	Band of Sisters	Jo Han-sung	SBS
2019	Liver or Die	Jin Ji-ham	KBS2
2019	Arthdal Chronicles	Issroob	tvN
2020	Was It Love?	Ryu Jin	JTBC
2021	Secret Royal Inspector & Joy	Jang Ki-wan (cameo)	tvN
2022	Love Is for Suckers	Kim In-woo	ENA

=== Film ===
Year	Title	Role
2012	The Grand Heist	Kim Jae-joon

=== Variety show ===
Year	Title	Notes
2000	Achieve the Goal Saturday	
2007	Road Trip	
2010	Lucky Strike 300	Host

=== Music video appearances ===
Year	Song title	Artist
2004	"For You Not to Know"	As One
2007	"Say Goodbye"	i

== Musical theatre ==
Year	Title	Role
2008–2009	Music in My Heart	Jang Jae-hyuk

== Awards and nominations ==
Year	Award	Category	Nominated work	Result
2000	Model Center	Model Best 10, Print Model category	—N/a	Won
2007	SBS Drama Awards	New Star Award	Surgeon Bong Dal-hee	Won
2011	KBS Drama Awards	Best New Actor	The Princess' Man	Nominated
