= The Woman Who Swallowed the Sun =

2025 South Korean television series

- Promotional poster
- Hangul: 태양을 삼킨 여자
- RR: Taeyangeul samkin yeoja
- MR: T'aeyangŭl samk'in yŏja
- Genre: Melodrama; Revenge; Romance; Crime thriller
- Written by: Seol Kyung-eun
- Directed by: Kim Jin-hyun
- Starring: Jang Shin-young; Seo Ha-joon; Yoon A-jung; Oh Chang-seok
- Music by: Ma Sang-woo
- Country of origin: South Korea
- Original language: Korean
- No. of episodes: 125

Production
- Camera setup: Multi-camera
- Running time: 27–31 minutes
- Production company: MBC C&I

Original release
- Network: MBC TV
- Release: June 9 – December 12, 2025

The Woman Who Swallowed the Sun (Korean: 태양을 삼킨 여자) is a 2025 South Korean television series written by Seol Kyung-eun and directed by Kim Jin-hyun. Produced under MBC C&I, it stars Jang Shin-young, Seo Ha-joon, Yoon A-jung and Oh Chang-seok. It aired on MBC TV from June 9, to December 12, 2025, every Monday to Friday at 19:05 (KST).

== Premise ==
A drama depicting the desperate revenge of a woman who, in the name of her only daughter, takes on a chaebol family in a world where victims are made to appear as perpetrators.

== Cast ==
=== Main ===
- Jang Shin-young as Baek Seol-hee / Lucia Jung
- Seo Ha-joon as Moon Tae-kyeong
- Yoon A-jung as Min Kyeong-chae
- Oh Chang-seok as Kim Sun-jae

=== Supporting ===
- Jeon No-min as Min Du-sik
- Ahn So-jin as Min Soo-jung
- Park Seo-yeon as Min Se-ri
- Kang Suk-jung as Min Ji-seob
- Son Se-bin as Oh Ja-kyeong
- Lee Kan-hee as Jang Yeon-sook
- Park Cheol-min as Oh Pan-sul
- Kim Nan-hee as Yang Mal-suk
- Lee Lu-da as Baek Mi-soo (Ep.1–12)

== Production ==
=== Development ===
The series was officially commissioned with Kim Jin-hyun serving as director and the script is penned by Seol Kyung-eun, while MBC C&I managed the production. On May 7, 2025, the video of the script reading session was revealed. The press conference was held on June 5, 2025, at the MBC in Sangam-dong.

On November 19, 2025, the series was extended for 5 additional episodes, from 120 episodes to 125.

=== Casting ===
In March 2025, it was reported that Jang Shin-young, Seo Ha-joon and Oh Chang-seok would appear in the series. On April 8, the casting lineup, which includes Jang Shin-young, Seo Ha-joon, Yoon A-jung and Oh Chang-seok was officially confirmed. On the same month, Lee Lu-da joined the cast. In May 2025, Son Se-bin and Ahn Yi-seo were reportedly cast to appear.

=== Filming ===
Principal photography of the series commenced on Thursday, March 27, 2025 at 9:00 (KST).

== Release ==
The series premiered on MBC TV on July 23, 2025, and aired on a Monday–Friday timeslot at 19:05 (KST).

== Viewership ==
The Woman Who Swallowed the Sun : South Korea viewers per episode (thousands)

1	Episode number																								
1	1	2	3	4	5	6	7	8	9	10	11	12	13	14	15	16	17	18	19	20	21	22	23	24	25
1–25	640	543	586	649	643	773	704	558	680	802	659	700	682	718	666	733	741	844	794	783	814	744	827	715	774
26–50	800	784	971	883	814	761	797	822	839	666	756	773	780	817	701	810	821	735	710	808	841	766	799	755	778
51–75	N/A	812	787	881	848	889	782	825	883	850	876	875	836	822	812	860	854	870	787	948	875	937	886	899	949
76–100	837	852	1014	862	942	861	842	930	947	813	910	1059	952	942	957	909	920	995	948	931	932	889	991	953	896
101–125	1047	989	998	904	948	1024	1155	1100	980	1094	1092	1109	1086	1041	1006	1052	1138	1186	1076	1141	1157	1194	1220	N/A	1213

Source: Audience measurement performed nationwide by Nielsen Korea

EP	Original broadcast date	Nielsen Korea
EP	Original broadcast date	Nationwide
1	June 9, 2025	3.8%
2	June 10, 2025	3.3%
3	June 11, 2025	3.5%
4	June 12, 2025	3.6%
5	June 13, 2025	3.8%
6	June 16, 2025	4.3%
7	June 17, 2025	3.8%
8	June 18, 2025	3.5%
9	June 19, 2025	3.8%
10	June 20, 2025	4.7%
11	June 23, 2025	3.6%
12	June 24, 2025	4.2%
13	June 25, 2025	3.9%
14	June 26, 2025	3.7%
15	June 27, 2025	3.9%
16	June 30, 2025	4.2%
17	July 1, 2025	4.3%
18	July 2, 2025	4.9%
19	July 3, 2025	4.4%
20	July 4, 2025	4.5%
21	July 7, 2025	4.5%
22	July 8, 2025	4.3%
23	July 9, 2025	4.7%
24	July 10, 2025	4.2%
25	July 11, 2025	4.4%
26	July 14, 2025	4.5%
27	July 15, 2025	4.7%
28	July 16, 2025	5.4%
29	July 17, 2025	5.4%
30	July 18, 2025	4.6%
31	July 21, 2025	4.7%
32	July 22, 2025	4.7%
33	July 23, 2025	4.6%
34	July 24, 2025	4.7%
35	July 25, 2025	3.9%
36	July 28, 2025	4.3%
37	July 29, 2025	4.4%
38	July 30, 2025	4.5%
39	July 31, 2025	4.9%
40	August 1, 2025	4.1%
41	August 4, 2025	4.7%
42	August 5, 2025	4.7%
43	August 6, 2025	4.3%
44	August 7, 2025	4.3%
45	August 8, 2025	4.7%
46	August 11, 2025	4.7%
47	August 12, 2025	4.6%
48	August 13, 2025	4.9%
49	August 14, 2025	4.7%
50	August 15, 2025	4.3%
51	August 18, 2025	4.8%<
52	August 19, 2025	4.7%
53	August 20, 2025	4.7%
54	August 21, 2025	5.0%
55	August 22, 2025	4.9%
56	August 22, 2025	5.2%
57	August 26, 2025	4.7%
58	August 27, 2025	4.8%
59	August 28, 2025	5.1%
60	August 29, 2025	4.9%
61	September 1, 2025	5.3%
62	September 2, 2025	5.1%
63	September 3, 2025	4.8%
64	September 4, 2025	4.9%
65	September 5, 2025	4.7%
66	September 8, 2025	5.2%
67	September 9, 2025	4.8%
68	September 10, 2025	5.0%
69	September 11, 2025	4.8%
70	September 12, 2025	5.4%
71	September 15, 2025	5.2%
72	September 16, 2025	5.5%
73	September 17, 2025	5.4%
74	September 18, 2025	5.4%
75	September 19, 2025	5.7%
76	September 22, 2025	5.0%
77	September 23, 2025	5.2%
78	September 24, 2025	5.8%
79	September 25, 2025	5.2%
80	September 26, 2025	5.3%
81	September 29, 2025	5.3%
82	September 30, 2025	4.9%
83	October 1, 2025	5.4%
84	October 2, 2025	5.6%
85	October 9, 2025	4.8%
86	October 10, 2025	5.4%
87	October 13, 2025	6.0%
88	October 15, 2025	5.4%
89	October 16, 2025	5.4%
90	October 17, 2025	5.6%
91	October 20, 2025	5.4%
92	October 21, 2025	5.4%
93	October 22, 2025	5.7%
94	October 23, 2025	5.4%
95	October 27, 2025	5.3%
96	October 28, 2025	5.6%
97	October 31, 2025	5.3%
98	November 3, 2025	6.0%
99	November 4, 2025	5.4%
100	November 5, 2025	5.1%
101	November 6, 2025	5.8%
102	November 7, 2025	5.6%
103	November 10, 2025	5.8%
104	November 11, 2025	5.4%
105	November 12, 2025	5.5%
106	November 13, 2025	6.1%
107	November 17, 2025	6.5%
108	November 18, 2025	6.2%
109	November 19, 2025	5.9%
110	November 20, 2025	6.4%
111	November 21, 2025	6.2%
112	November 24, 2025	6.4%
113	November 25, 2025	6.5%
114	November 26, 2025	6.0%
115	November 27, 2025	6.0%
116	November 28, 2025	6.0%
117	December 1, 2025	6.6%
118	December 2, 2025	6.8%
119	December 4, 2025	6.2%
120	December 8, 2025	6.6%
121	December 9, 2025	6.4%
122	December 10, 2025	6.6%
123	December 11, 2025	6.9%
124	December 12, 2025	2.8%
125	December 12, 2025	6.5%
Average		_
