= The Secret House (TV series) =

2022 South korean television series

- Promotional poster
- Hangul: 비밀의 집
- Hanja: 秘密의 집
- RR: Bimirui jip
- MR: Pimirŭi chip
- Genre: Melodrama; Revenge; Romance; Mystery; Crime
- Created by: MBC Drama Division
- Written by: Won Yeong-ok
- Directed by: Lee Min-soo
- Starring: Seo Ha-jun; Lee Young-eun; Kim Jung-heon
- Music by: Shasa
- Country of origin: South Korea
- Original language: Korean
- No. of episodes: 124

Production
- Producers: Kim Sang-heon; Baek Ho-min
- Running time: 40 minutes
- Production companies: MBC C&I; Green Snake Media

Original release
- Network: MBC TV
- Release: April 11 – October 10, 2022

The Secret House (Korean: 비밀의 집; RR: Bimirui jip) is a 2022 South Korean television series starring Seo Ha-jun, Lee Young-eun and Kim Jung-heon. The series, directed by Lee Min-soo and written by Won Yeong-ok for Green Snake Media, is a revenge story in which a dirt spoon lawyer chasing the traces of his missing mother walks into the secret surrounding him to fight the world. The daily drama premiered on MBC on April 11, 2022, and aired every weekday at 19:10 (KST) for 124 episodes.

== Cast and characters ==
=== Main ===
- Seo Ha-joon as Woo Ji-hwan

A dirt spoon lawyer, who has a secret to hide in the face of his family's misfortune.

- Lee Young-eun as Baek Joo-hong

The daughter of Sang-gu and Haeng-ja. Woo Ji-hwan's first love and a bright and warm-hearted emergency medicine resident.

- Kim Jung-heon as Nam Tae-hyung

Sook-jin's son. Seoul Central District Prosecutor's Office Criminal Division 1 Prosecutor.

- Kang Byul as Nam Tae-hee

Sook-jin's daughter. Wide Marketing Department Manager.

- Lee Seung-yeon as Ham Sook-jin

Nam Tae-hyung and Nam Tae-hee's mother. Wide Representative. She can do anything for his son.

=== Supporting ===
==== Ji-hwan's house ====
- Yoon Bok-in as Kim Kyeong-seon

Ji-Hwan's mother.

- Yoon A-jung as Woo Min-young

Ji-hwan's older sister.

- Park Ye-rin as Woo Sol

Ji-hwan's daughter.

- Ahn Yong-joon as Heo Jin-ho

Ji-hwan's employee and assistant.

==== Tae-hyung's house ====
- Jang Hang-sun as Nam Heung-sik

The largest building owner, and honorary chairman of Wide.

- Bang Eun-hee as Yoo Gwang-mi

Heung-sik's primary care nurse.

- Jo Yu-shin as Yang Man-su

Butler of Nam Heung-sik's family.

==== Scarlet house ====
- Park Chung-sun as Baek Sang-goo

Joo-hong's father.

- Kim Nan-hee as Shim Haeng-ja

Joo-hong's mother and Sang-goo's wife.

== Production ==
Director Lee Min-soo and Lee Young-eun are reuniting after 12 years since MBC daily 2010 soap opera The Scarlet Letter. Lee Young-eun, herself is returning to TV series after hiatus of 3 years. She was last seen in KBS daily drama Home for Summer. Yoon A-jung and Yoon Bok-in are working together after 5 years, since the 2016-17 KBS daily drama That Sun in the Sky.

== International broadcast ==
In Vietnam, the series was broadcast on VTV3 from June 7, 2023 under the title Ngôi nhà bí mật.

In India, the series was broadcast on Atrangii from July 3, 2023 under the title My Secret House.

== Original soundtrack ==
The Secret House

Soundtrack album by Various
- Released: 2022
- Genre: Soundtrack
- Languages: Korean; English
- Labels: Dreamus; KG Company

=== Part 1 ===
Released on April 26, 2022
| No. | Title | Lyrics | Music | Artist | Length |
|---|---|---|---|---|---|
| 1. | "Goodbye" (한영주) | Jongsu Wi, Jinho Huh, Nam Taenam | Jongsu Wi, Huh Jin-ho | Han Young-joo | 4:17 |
| 2. | "Goodbye" (inst.) | | | | 4:17 |

=== Part 2 ===
Released on May 30, 2022
| No. | Title | Lyrics | Music | Artist | Length |
|---|---|---|---|---|---|
| 1. | "Bad Dream" (나쁜 꿈) | Jinho Heo, Taegyu Kang | Jongsu Wi | Han Young-joo | 4:30 |
| 2. | "Bad Dream" (inst.) | | | | 4:30 |

=== Part 3 ===
Released on August 13, 2022
| No. | Title | Lyrics | Music | Artist | Length |
|---|---|---|---|---|---|
| 1. | "Lies" (거짓말) | Hee-seong Yoon, Tae-gyu Kang | Yoon Hee-sung | Kang Joo-won | 3:54 |
| 2. | "Lies" (inst.) | | | | 3:54 |

=== Part 4 ===
Released on August 26, 2022
| No. | Title | Lyrics | Music | Artist | Length |
|---|---|---|---|---|---|
| 1. | "Don't Leave Me" (가지마) | Wi Jong-soo | Wi Jong-soo | Han Young-joo | 4:23 |
| 2. | "Don't Leave Me" (inst.) | | | | 4:23 |

=== Part 5 ===
Released on September 4, 2022
| No. | Title | Lyrics | Music | Artist | Length |
|---|---|---|---|---|---|
| 1. | "Vacancy" (빈자리) | Birth | Wi Jong-soo | Han Young-joo | 4:23 |
| 2. | "Vacancy" (inst.) | | | | 4:23 |

== Viewership ==
The Secret House : South Korea viewers per episode (thousands)

| Episodes of | Episode number | | | | | | | | | | | | | | | | | | | |
| Episodes of | 1 | 2 | 3 | 4 | 5 | 6 | 7 | 8 | 9 | 10 | 11 | 12 | 13 | 14 | 15 | 16 | 17 | 18 | 19 | 20 |
|---|---|---|---|---|---|---|---|---|---|---|---|---|---|---|---|---|---|---|---|---|
| 1–20 | 701 | 796 | 928 | 851 | 751 | 900 | 897 | 800 | 995 | 810 | 904 | 778 | 816 | 956 | 887 | 847 | 880 | 733 | 921 | 753 |
| 21-40 | 875 | 628 | 832 | 975 | 808 | 888 | 735 | 831 | 903 | 731 | 778 | 850 | 879 | 613 | 837 | 555 | 793 | 744 | 889 | 957 |
| 41-60 | 878 | 901 | 801 | 890 | 955 | 911 | 970 | 877 | 900 | 656 | 906 | 1078 | 941 | 928 | 932 | 948 | 904 | 727 | 937 | 875 |
| 61-80 | 841 | 1030 | 829 | 839 | 897 | 1003 | 1006 | 784 | 901 | 873 | 957 | 1031 | 976 | 935 | 958 | 869 | 1059 | 951 | 1045 | 1018 |
| 81-100 | 1047 | 1021 | 1020 | 1166 | 1082 | 1007 | 1184 | 1087 | 1075 | 1198 | 1035 | 1162 | 1071 | 1101 | 1091 | 1212 | 1135 | 1236 | 1168 | 1226 |
| 101-120 | 1172 | 1238 | 1183 | 1095 | 1190 | 1151 | 1272 | 1218 | 1128 | 1144 | 1111 | 1171 | 1173 | 1276 | 1230 | 1321 | 1353 | 1210 | 1413 | 1242 |
| 121-124 | 1144 | 1250 | 1385 | 1418 | – | | | | | | | | | | | | | | | |

Source: Audience measurement performed nationwide by °Nielsen Korea.

| Ep. | Original broadcast date | Average audience share | | |
| Ep. | Original broadcast date | Nielsen Korea | | TNmS |
| Ep. | Original broadcast date | Nationwide | Seoul | Nationwide |
|---|---|---|---|---|
| 1 | April 11, 2022 | 4.9% (12th) | 4.6% (14th) | —N/a |
| 2 | April 12, 2022 | 5.4% (12th) | 5.2% (12th) | 5.8% (10th) |
| 3 | April 13, 2022 | 5.7% (9th) | 5.5% (9th) | 7.8% (7th) |
| 4 | April 14, 2022 | 5.5% (10th) | 5.0% (12th) | 7.2% (8th) |
| 5 | April 15, 2022 | 4.7% (14th) | 4.6% (15th) | 5.8% (10th) |
| 6 | April 18, 2022 | 5.8% (11th) | 5.3% (12th) | 6.5% (9th) |
| 7 | April 19, 2022 | 5.8% (8th) | 5.5% (6th) | 6.8% (6th) |
| 8 | April 20, 2022 | 5.2% (13th) | 4.8% (15th) | 6.8% (8th) |
| 9 | April 21, 2022 | 6.1% (8th) | 5.8% (8th) | 6.8% (8th) |
| 10 | April 22, 2022 | 5.5% (12th) | 5.6% (11th) | 6.2% (9th) |
| 11 | April 25, 2022 | 5.7% (11th) | 5.2% (11th) | 7.4% (8th) |
| 12 | April 26, 2022 | 5.1% (11th) | 4.6% (11th) | 5.7% (9th) |
| 13 | April 27, 2022 | 5.1% (11th) | 4.9% (12th) | 6.7% (7th) |
| 14 | April 28, 2022 | 6.0% (9th) | 5.9% (7th) | 7.9% (5th) |
| 15 | April 29, 2022 | 5.6% (11th) | 5.7% (10th) | 6.8% (9th) |
| 16 | May 2, 2022 | 5.4% (12th) | 5.1% (14th) | 6.6% (8th) |
| 17 | May 3, 2022 | 5.3% (12th) | 5.1% (11th) | 6.9% (7th) |
| 18 | May 4, 2022 | 4.9% (11th) | 5.1% (10th) | 7.2% (7th) |
| 19 | May 5, 2022 | 5.8% (6th) | 5.5% (6th) | 7.1% (5th) |
| 20 | May 6, 2022 | 5.0% (13th) | 5.3% (12th) | 6.6% (7th) |
| 21 | May 9, 2022 | 5.4% (8th) | 5.2% (8th) | 6.4% (9th) |
| 22 | May 10, 2022 | 4.0% (17th) | 3.9% (16th) | 5.1% (11th) |
| 23 | May 11, 2022 | 5.1% (9th) | 5.2% (8th) | 6.9% (7th) |
| 24 | May 12, 2022 | 6.0% (6th) | 5.5% (7th) | 7.1% (5th) |
| 25 | May 13, 2022 | 5.2% (11th) | 4.9% (12th) | 6.9% (5th) |
| 26 | May 16, 2022 | 5.6% (11th) | 5.7% (9th) | 7.3% (5th) |
| 27 | May 17, 2022 | 4.7% (12th) | 4.4% (16th) | 6.1% (9th) |
| 28 | May 18, 2022 | 4.8% (13th) | 4.1% (15th) | 6.9% (6th) |
| 29 | May 19, 2022 | 5.6% (7th) | 5.6% (7th) | 7.0% (6th) |
| 30 | May 23, 2022 (Note: The 30 episode was cancelled for May 20 due to 'News Special'.) | 4.6% (16th) | 4.7% (15th) | 6.3% (10th) |
| 31 | May 24, 2022 | 4.8% (13th) | 4.4% (15th) | 6.5% (7th) |
| 32 | May 25, 2022 | 5.2% (11th) | 5.0% (10th) | 7.0% (7th) |
| 33 | May 26, 2022 | 5.2% (9th) | 5.1% (9th) | 6.6% (9th) |
| 34 | May 27, 2022 | 3.8% (17th) | 3.6% (16th) | 5.0% (13th) |
| 35 | May 30, 2022 | 5.4% (14th) | 5.1% (13th) | 7.2% (7th) |
| 36 | May 31, 2022 | 3.5% (19th) | 3.6% (14th) | 4.3% (12th) |
| 37 | June 2, 2022 (Note: 37th episode was cancelled for June 1 due to 'the 8th National Simultaneous Local Election Counting Broadcast'.) | 5.0% (9th) | 5.0% (8th) | 7.1% (6th) |
| 38 | June 3, 2022 | 4.8% (12th) | 4.7% (11th) | 6.4% (7th) |
| 39 | June 6, 2022 | 5.3% (12th) | 5.5% (9th) | 6.9% (7th) |
| 40 | June 7, 2022 | 5.6% (9th) | 5.4% (8th) | 6.8% (7th) |
| 41 | June 8, 2022 | 5.3% (12th) | 5.5% (9th) | 6.8% (9th) |
| 42 | June 9, 2022 | 5.3% (9th) | 5.0% (10th) | 7.6% (6th) |
| 43 | June 10, 2022 | 5.2% (12th) | 5.6% (11th) | 7.2% (7th) |
| 44 | June 13, 2022 | 5.5% (11th) | 5.2% (11th) | 7.4% (8th) |
| 45 | June 14, 2022 | 6.0% (9th) | 5.5% (8th) | 7.4% (8th) |
| 46 | June 15, 2022 | 5.5% (11th) | 5.5% (10th) | 7.6% (8th) |
| 47 | June 16, 2022 | 6.0% (7th) | 5.5% (6th) | 7.9% (5th) |
| 48 | June 17, 2022 | 5.5% (11th) | 5.3% (10th) | 7.4% (6th) |
| 49 | June 20, 2022 | 5.3% (12th) | 5.3% (10th) | 7.6% (6th) |
| 50 | June 21, 2022 | 4.1% (15th) | 4.2% (13th) | 5.2% (11th) |
| 51 | June 22, 2022 | 5.8% (9th) | 5.5% (7th) | 7.7% (6th) |
| 52 | June 23, 2022 | 6.8% (6th) | 6.9% (5th) | 8.6% (6th) |
| 53 | June 24, 2022 | 5.8% (10th) | 5.9% (10th) | 6.5% (9th) |
| 54 | June 27, 2022 | 5.8% (12th) | 5.5% (12th) | 8.0% (5th) |
| 55 | June 28, 2022 | 5.8% (10th) | 5.6% (10th) | 8.3% (6th) |
| 56 | June 29, 2022 | 6.1% (9th) | 6.0% (10th) | 7.9% (7th) |
| 57 | June 30, 2022 | 5.6% (10th) | 5.3% (10th) | 7.3% (8th) |
| 58 | July 1, 2022 | 5.1% (11th) | 4.6% (11th) | 6.0% (10th) |
| 59 | July 4, 2022 | 6.1% (8th) | 5.6% (9th) | 6.8% (9th) |
| 60 | July 5, 2022 | 5.5% (11th) | 4.8% (13th) | 7.1% (7th) |
| 61 | July 6, 2022 | 5.5% (9th) | 5.4% (7th) | 7.0% (8th) |
| 62 | July 7, 2022 | 6.6% (6th) | 6.3% (6th) | 8.4% (5th) |
| 63 | July 8, 2022 | 5.3% (12th) | 4.9% (13th) | —N/a |
| 64 | July 11, 2022 | 5.7% (10th) | 5.4% (8th) | 7.3% (9th) |
| 65 | July 12, 2022 | 6.2% (8th) | 5.7% (7th) | 7.6% (6th) |
| 66 | July 13, 2022 | 6.4% (9th) | 5.8% (8th) | 9.1% (6th) |
| 67 | July 14, 2022 | 6.3% (6th) | 5.8% (5th) | 7.6% (6th) |
| 68 | July 15, 2022 | 5.1% (10th) | 4.8% (11th) | 6.6% (9th) |
| 69 | July 18, 2022 | 6.1% (11th) | 5.3% (13th) | 8.5% (6th) |
| 70 | July 19, 2022 | 5.7% (9th) | 5.4% (9th) | 7.8% (6th) |
| 71 | July 20, 2022 | 6.3% (7th) | 6.2% (7th) | 7.7% (8th) |
| 72 | July 21, 2022 | 6.6% (6th) | 6.6% (6th) | 7.6% (7th) |
| 73 | July 22, 2022 | 6.0% (9th) | 5.9% (9th) | 7.6% (6th) |
| 74 | July 25, 2022 | 6.0% (6th) | 5.4% (8th) | 8.5% (5th) |
| 75 | July 26, 2022 | 6.2% (6th) | 6.0% (6th) | 7.2% (7th) |
| 76 | July 27, 2022 | 6.0% (8th) | 5.2% (7th) | 7.1% (8th) |
| 77 | July 28, 2022 | 6.6% (7th) | 6.3% (6th) | 7.8% (6th) |
| 78 | July 29, 2022 | 6.1% (8th) | 5.8% (8th) | 7.6% (5th) |
| 79 | August 1, 2022 | 6.6% (7th) | 6.1% (6th) | 8.0% (8th) |
| 80 | August 2, 2022 | 6.2% (7th) | 5.8% (6th) | 7.7% (6th) |
| 81 | August 3, 2022 | 6.3% (6th) | 6.1% (6th) | 7.1% (8th) |
| 82 | August 4, 2022 | 6.5% (5th) | 6.0% (5th) | 7.9% (5th) |
| 83 | August 5, 2022 | 6.3% (7th) | 5.9% (8th) | 8.0% (6th) |
| 84 | August 8, 2022 | 6.8% (8th) | 6.3% (11th) | 8.5% (4th) |
| 85 | August 11, 2022 (Note: 85th episode was cancelled for August 9 due to 'News Special'. On August 10th, the broadcast was canceled and replaced with a special news.) | 6.9% (6th) | 6.1% (6th) | —N/a |
| 86 | August 12, 2022 | 6.3% (9th) | 6.3% (8th) | 7.5% (7th) |
| 87 | August 15, 2022 | 6.7% (8th) | 6.5% (5th) | 8.1% (5th) |
| 88 | August 16, 2022 | 6.8% (7th) | 6.0% (8th) | 8.5% (6th) |
| 89 | August 17, 2022 | 6.9% (6th) | 6.5% (6th) | 8.4% (5th) |
| 90 | August 18, 2022 | 7.3% (5th) | 6.8% (4th) | 8.5% (4th) |
| 91 | August 19, 2022 | 6.6% (8th) | 6.2% (9th) | 8.6% (7th) |
| 92 | August 22, 2022 | 6.8% (7th) | 6.5% (7th) | 8.4% (5th) |
| 93 | August 23, 2022 | 7.0% (6th) | 6.4% (8th) | 8.5% (5th) |
| 94 | August 24, 2022 | 6.6% (6th) | 6.4% (5th) | 7.5% (6th) |
| 95 | August 25, 2022 | 7.2% (5th) | 6.6% (4th) | 8.7% (5th) |
| 96 | August 26, 2022 | 7.2% (8th) | 7.0% (8th) | 8.1% (7th) |
| 97 | August 29, 2022 | 7.5% (6th) | 7.4% (5th) | 9.3% (4th) |
| 98 | August 30, 2022 | 7.5% (7th) | 7.2% (5th) | 8.6% (7th) |
| 99 | August 31, 2022 | 7.4% (6th) | 7.0% (5th) | 8.9% (6th) |
| 100 | September 1, 2022 | 7.6% (5th) | 7.1% (4th) | 9.6% (4th) |
| 101 | September 2, 2022 | 7.0% (7th) | 6.6% (6th) | 8.9% (5th) |
| 102 | September 6, 2022 (Note: The 101st episode was cancelled for September 5, due to broadcast of disaster broadcasting.) | 7.2% (7th) | 6.9% (6th) | 8.4% (6th) |
| 103 | September 7, 2022 | 7.3% (6th) | 7.0% (6th) | 8.8% (6th) |
| 104 | September 8, 2022 | 6.6% (5th) | 6.2% (5th) | 9.4% (4th) |
| 105 | September 13, 2022 (Note: The 105th episode was cancelled for September 9 and 12 for the broadcast of 2022 Idol Star Athletics Championships.) | 7.2% (5th) | 6.2% (6th) | 9.3% (4th) |
| 106 | September 14, 2022 | 7.2% (7th) | 7.0% (6th) | 10.1% (4th) |
| 107 | September 15, 2022 | 8.1% (5th) | 7.8% (4th) | 10.1% (3rd) |
| 108 | September 16, 2022 | 7.5% (6th) | 7.1% (6th) | 9.4% (6th) |
| 109 | September 19, 2022 | 7.1% (5th) | 7.2% (4th) | 9.4% (4th) |
| 110 | September 20, 2022 | 7.1% (5th) | 6.9% (5th) | 9.4% (4th) |
| 111 | September 21, 2022 | 7.1% (6th) | 6.6% (7th) | 9.0% (6th) |
| 112 | September 22, 2022 | 7.3% (5th) | 6.8% (5th) | 8.2% (4th) |
| 113 | September 23, 2022 | 7.6% (6th) | 7.3% (6th) | 8.2% (6th) |
| 114 | September 26, 2022 | 7.5% (5th) | 7.4% (4th) | 10.0% (4th) |
| 115 | September 27, 2022 | 7.7% (5th) | 7.3% (4th) | 9.7% (3rd) |
| 116 | September 28, 2022 | 8.1% (4th) | 7.9% (5th) | 9.6% (4th) |
| 117 | September 29, 2022 | 8.4% (4th) | 8.2% (3rd) | 9.4% (4th) |
| 118 | September 30, 2022 | 6.8% (7th) | 6.3% (6th) | —N/a |
| 119 | October 3, 2022 | 8.0% (5th) | 7.9% (4th) | 9.3% (5th) |
| 120 | October 4, 2022 | 7.5% (6th) | 7.5% (4th) | 9.9% (4th) |
| 121 | October 5, 2022 | 7.0% (6th) | 6.4% (6th) | 9.6% (3rd) |
| 122 | October 6, 2022 | 7.5% (5th) | 7.0% (4th) | 10.2% (4th) |
| 123 | October 7, 2022 | 8.0% (5th) | 8.0% (5th) | 8.9% (4th) |
| 124 | October 10, 2022 | 7.6% (6th) | 7.5% (5th) | 9.0% (5th) |
| Average | | — | — | — |
In this table, the blue numbers represent the lowest ratings and the red numbers represent the highest ratings.; N/A denotes that the rating is not known.

== Awards and nominations ==
| Year | Award | Category | Recipient | Result | Ref. |
|---|---|---|---|---|---|
| 2022 | MBC Drama Awards | Excellence Award, Actor in a Daily/Short Drama | Seo Ha-joon | Won | |
| 2022 | MBC Drama Awards | Excellence Award, Actor in a Daily/Short Drama | Kim Jung-heon | Nominated | |
| 2022 | MBC Drama Awards | Excellence Award, Actress in a Daily/One Act Drama | Kang Byul | Nominated | |
