= Secrets of Women =

Secrets of Women may refer to:

- Secrets of Women (film), a 1952 Swedish film
- Secrets of Women (TV series), a 2016 South Korean television series
