= Only Love (TV series) =

- Promotional poster
- Also known as: I Just Want to Love; I Only Want to Love
- Genre: Romance; Family; Melodrama; Revenge
- Written by: Choi Yoon-jeong
- Directed by: Ahn Gil-ho
- Starring: Seo Ha-joon; Im Se-mi; Lee Kyu-han; Nam Bo-ra; Yoon Jong-hoon; Kim Ye-won
- Country of origin: South Korea
- Original language: Korean
- No. of episodes: 123

Production
- Executive producer: Kim Young-sub
- Producers: Jung Yong-woo; Min Yeon-hong; Park Sun-young
- Production location: South Korea
- Running time: 40 minutes Mondays to Fridays at 19:20 (KST)
- Production companies: SBS Plus; Curtain Call Inc.

Original release
- Network: Seoul Broadcasting System
- Release: 2 June – 12 December 2014

Only Love (Korean: 사랑만 할래; RR: Sarangman hallae) is a 2014 South Korean daily drama melodrama television series starring Seo Ha-joon, Im Se-mi, Lee Kyu-han, Nam Bo-ra, Yoon Jong-hoon, and Kim Ye-won. It aired on SBS on Mondays to Fridays at 19:20 for 123 episodes from June 2 to December 12, 2014.

== Plot ==
Kim Tae-yang is a physician and Choi Yoo-ri is a broadcasting producer. Choi Jae-min is a dandy-ish executive at a clothing company and Kim Saet-byul is an unwed mother. Kim Woo-joo is much younger than Hong Mi-rae.

As these three couples fall in love, they explore issues of age difference, blood ties and adoption, and wealth and poverty.

== Cast ==
=== Main characters ===
- Seo Ha-joon as Kim Tae-yang
- Im Se-mi as Choi Yoo-ri
- Lee Kyu-han as Choi Jae-min
- Nam Bo-ra as Kim Saet-byul
- Yoon Jong-hoon as Kim Woo-joo
- Kim Ye-won as Hong Mi-rae

=== Supporting characters ===
- Jung Sung-mo as Kim Sang-bae
- Song Ok-sook as Oh Mal-sook
- Yoon So-jung as Yang Yang-soon
- Jung Hye-sun as Woo Jeom-soon
- Han Seo-jin as Kim Soo-ah
- Kil Yong-woo as Choi Dong-joon
- Lee Eung-kyung as Lee Young-ran
- Lee Hyun-wook as Choi Yoo-bin
- Seo Woo-rim as Kang Min-ja
- Noh Young-gook as Choi Myung-joon
- Oh Mi-hee as Jung Sook-hee
- Lee Jung-eun as Park Soon-ja
- Lee Ga-ryeong as Head of design department
- Kim Na-young
- Shin Soo-jung
- Joo Hyun-jin

== Awards and nominations ==
Year	Award	Category	Recipient	Result
2014	3rd APAN Star Awards	Best Supporting Actress	Song Ok-sook	Nominated
2014	3rd APAN Star Awards	Best New Actress	Nam Bo-ra	Won
2014	22nd SBS Drama Awards	New Star Award	Nam Bo-ra	Won
2014	22nd SBS Drama Awards	New Star Award	Seo Ha-joon	Won
