= MBC C&I =

Korean drama production company

MBC C&I Co., Ltd.
- Native name: 주식회사 엠비씨씨앤아이
- Genre: Korean drama
- Founded: January 1, 1990 (as MBC Mediatech Co., Ltd.)
- Headquarters: 396 (Sangam-dong), World cup buk-ro, Mapo District, Seoul, South Korea
- Key people: Doo In-tae (President and CEO)
- Products: TV series
- Services: TV series production; TV series sale
- Owner: Munhwa Broadcasting Corporation
- Parent: Munhwa Broadcasting Corporation
- Website: www.mbccni.co.kr

MBC C&I (Korean: 엠비씨씨앤아이, formerly MBC Mediatech and MBC Production) is a Korean drama production company. MBC C&I is a subsidiary of Munhwa Broadcasting Corporation.

== List of works ==
=== TV series ===
Year	Title	Original title	Network	Notes
2010	Pink Lipstick	분홍 립스틱	MBC TV	
2010	Joseon X-Files	조선X파일 기찰비록	tvN	
2011	Dangerous Woman	위험한 여자	MBC TV	
2011	Special Affairs Team TEN	특수사건전담반 TEN	OCN	
2012	Angel's Choice	천사의 선택	MBC TV	
2012	It Was Love	사랑했나봐	MBC TV	
2012	Ice Adonis	노란 복수초	tvN	
2012	Glass Mask	유리가면	tvN	
2013	You Are the Boss!	잘났어, 정말!	MBC TV	
2013	Hold My Hand	내 손을 잡아	MBC TV	
2013	Special Affairs Team TEN 2	특수사건전담반 TEN 2	OCN	
2014	Everybody Say Kimchi	모두 다 김치	MBC TV	
2014	Lady of the Storm	폭풍의 여자	MBC TV	
2015	Eve's Love	이브의 사랑	MBC TV	
2015	Victory for Tomorrow	내일도 승리	MBC TV	
2016	Good Person	좋은사람	MBC TV	
2016	Always Spring	언제나 봄날	MBC TV	
2017	Teacher Oh Soon-nam	훈장 오순남	MBC TV	
2017	Backflow	역류	MBC TV	
2018	Secrets and Lies	비밀과 거짓말	MBC TV	
2019	Blessing of the Sea	용왕님보우하사	MBC TV	
2021	The Second Husband	두 번째 남편	MBC TV	Co-produced by Pan Entertainment
2022	Secret House	비밀의 집	MBC TV	Co-produced by Green Snake Media
2022	Witch's Game	마녀의 게임	MBC TV	
2023	Meant to Be	하늘의 인연	MBC TV	
2023	The Third Marriage	세 번째 결혼	MBC TV	
2024	The Brave Yong Soo-jung	용감무쌍 용수정	MBC TV	
2024	Desperate Mrs. Seon-joo	친절한 선주씨	MBC TV	
2025	The Woman Who Swallowed the Sun	태양을 삼킨 여자		
2025-26	First Man	첫 번째 남자		DK Entertainment
2026	Love in Sync	공감세포		WeMad, LG U+
2026	Family Register	가족관계증명서		Void

=== TV shows ===
Year	Title	Original title	Network	Notes
2016	Dr. Go	닥터고	MBC TV	
2017	Living Together in Empty Room	발칙한 동거 - 빈방 있음	MBC TV	
2017	All Broadcasting in the World	세모방 : 세상의 모든 방송	MBC TV	
2017	Wizard of Nowhere	오지의 마법사	MBC TV	

=== Films ===
Year	Title	Original title	Notes
1997	Man With Flowers	꽃을 든 남자	
2002	Can't Live Without Robbery	도둑맞곤 못살아	
2002	Desire	욕망	Co-produced
2006	The Old Garden	오래된 정원	
2006	Moodori	무도리	
2006	My Scary Girl	달콤, 살벌한 연인	
2008	Tears in the Arctic	북극의 눈물	Co-produced
