= The Noblesse =

2014 South Korean television series

- Promotional poster
- Hangul: 귀부인
- RR: Gwibuin
- MR: Kwibuin
- Genre: Romance
- Written by: Ho Young-ok
- Directed by: Han Chul-soo; Sunwoo Young-gun
- Starring: Seo Ji-hye; Park Jung-ah; Hyun Woo-sung; Jung Sung-woon
- Country of origin: South Korea
- Original language: Korean
- No. of episodes: 114

Production
- Running time: 40 minutes
- Production company: Drama House

Original release
- Network: JTBC
- Release: January 13 – August 8, 2014

The Noblesse (Korean: 귀부인; RR: Gwibuin; lit. 'Noblewoman') is a 2014 South Korean television series starring Seo Ji-hye, Park Jung-ah, Hyun Woo-sung and Jung Sung-woon. It aired on JTBC's Monday–Friday time slot from January 13 to August 8, 2014.

== Synopsis ==
The friendship and love stories of two women with completely different backgrounds.

== Cast ==
=== Main ===
- Seo Ji-hye as Yoon Shin-ae
- Park Jung-ah as Lee Mi-na
- Hyun Woo-sung as Han Jung-min
- Jung Sung-woon as Park Young-min

=== Supporting ===
- Chang Mi-hee as Hong Sun-joo
- Ryu Tae-joon as Baek Gi-ha
- Na Young-hee as Gi-ha's mother
- Sunwoo Eun-sook as Bang Jung-sim
- Lee Si-eon as Yoon Shin-joong
- Han Ye-won as Jung Seok-kyung
- Choi Ro-woon as Park Joon-hee
- Moon Hee-kyung as Park Kyung-ja
- Yoo Hye-ri as Hwang Myung-soon
- Dokgo Young-jae as Park Kyung-joon
- Yoon Ji-min as Yoo Hwa-young
- Lee Jae-woo as Kim Jin-wook
