= Ice Adonis =

2012 South Korean television drama

- Promotional poster
- Also known as: Yellow Boots
- Genre: Revenge; Melodrama
- Created by: CJ ENM; Park Ji-young; Choi Gwan-yong
- Written by: Yeo Jung-mi
- Directed by: Choi Eun-kyung
- Starring: Lee Yu-ri; Hyun Woo-sung; Yoon A-jung; Jung Chan
- Music by: Nam Hye-seung (CP); Ikeugeobuk
- Country of origin: South Korea
- Original language: Korean
- No. of episodes: 108

Production
- Executive producer: Baek Ho-min (MBC)
- Producers: Shin Seung-woo; Lee Hyung-sun
- Running time: 35 minute
- Production company: MBC C&I

Original release
- Network: tvN
- Release: February 27 – August 30, 2012

Related
- Snowdrop

Ice Adonis (Korean: 노란 복수초; RR: Noran boksucho; lit. 'Yellow Adonis'), also known as Yellow Boots, is a 2012 South Korean television drama series starring Lee Yu-ri, Hyun Woo-sung, Yoon A-jung and Jung Chan. It aired on tvN from February 27 to August 30, 2012 on Mondays to Thursdays at 09:45 KST for 108 episodes. The Korean title is named after the flower Adonis amurensis.

== Synopsis ==
Yeon-hwa and Yoo-ra became sisters after Yeon-hwa's mother engaged with Yoo-ra's father, but there is an invisible distance between both of them, especially Yeon-hwa's lover is Yoon-jae, who Yoo-ra crushes on. Until one day, Yoo-ra's car accidentally crashes into Yoon-hee, Yoon-jae's beloved sister, causing her to die. Yoo-ra then, comes up with a plan to blame Yeon-hwa for the accident, with the help of her father; a judge, and a police officer Park, whom she and her father bribed. This causes Yeon-hwa to be sentenced in jail for three years. When Yeon-hwa heard the news that Yoon-jae and Yoo-ra are to be married, she manages to escape from jail and plans to show up at the wedding unannounced, and do something drastic to Yoo-ra to get her to confess. After knowing that Yoon-jae and Yoo-ra are now a seemingly happy couple, Yeon-hwa decides to focus on keeping her health strong, and gives birth to a boy named Tae-yang (she didn't know she was pregnant before trying to escape prison). Because she is in jail, she is only allowed to take care of her baby for 18 months, and the baby has to be sent away, where they can get picked up after their parent is released from jail. At 18 months, the baby is heading off to an orphanage. However, Yoo-ra finds out about the baby and decides to switch his identity with another baby and send Tae-yang to a different couple, who was looking for a kid to adopt.

Later on, Yeon-hwa is released out of jail earlier, and she decides to bring Tae-yang home, but she quickly finds out that Tae-yang is nowhere to be seen and that none of the kids found at the orphanage is her child. Devastated, she decides to go on a search for Tae-yang, as she starts to revenge on Yoo-ra, Choi In-seok, and police officer Park Chang-do, and prove her innocence. Her revenge goes through many hardships, but Yeon-hwa succeeds in her plans, and wins over the position as vice president of J Cosmetics, and gains the trust from chairwoman Julia, Yoon-jae's biological mother, who was once set up by Yoon-jae's stepmother, causing Yoon-jae to misunderstand that his mother was cheating when she really was set up. Yeon-hwa also starts a relationship with the president of J Cosmetics, Choi Kang-wook, who is also the stepbrother of Yoon-jae.

== Cast ==
=== Main ===
- Lee Yu-ri as Seol Yeon-hwa

A kind hearted girl, who happens to be Yoon-jae's girlfriend; later ex-girlfriend, Yoo-ra's stepsister/rival, and Kang-wook's later on fiancé. She was wrongly convicted of murder, set up by Yoo-ra. While being in jail, she gives birth to Yoon-jae's child, but because she is in jail, she is forced to send her child, Tae-yang to an orphanage when he is 18 months old. However, when Yeon-hwa is released from jail, she realized Tae-yang has been taken away. She goes on a search to find him, and starts her revenge in the people she believed to have set her up. Throughout her revenge quest, she starts a relationship with Kang-wook and gains the trust of chairwoman Julia.

- Hyun Woo-sung as Ha Yoon-jae

The kind eldest son of J Cosmetics, who happens to be Yeon-hwa's boyfriend; later ex-boyfriend, Yoo-ra's childhood friend/long term crush, and Kang-wook's stepbrother. He truly and really loves Yeon-hwa and plans to marry her, but when Yeon-hwa was framed of killing his sister, he becomes upset and heartbroken, unaware that she was wrongly convicted. He then agrees to marry Yoo-ra. Later on, Yeon-hwa is released out of jail, and has reapplied to be an employee at J Cosmetics. Yoon-jae still believes that Yeon-hwa is the murderer, and tries his best not to care about her, but he still has feelings and protects her. He is the father of Tae-yang, and has no idea about it and Yoo-ra's evil plans. At times, he finds out about a few of Yoo-ra's plans to ruin Yeon-hwa, but has no idea Yoo-ra's plans years ago when the incident occurred, but he later found his wife suspicious and teams up with Kim Tae-il to find out if Yoo-ra is really the murderer of Yoon-hee.

- Yoon A-jung as Choi Yoo-ra

The ambitious daughter of a judge, Yeon-hwa's stepsister, and Yoon-jae's childhood friend, whom she crushes on. She rivals Yeon-hwa, and does anything to get her kicked out of J Cosmetics. She believes that Yoon-jae likes her, but is jealous and angry to find out that her crush is the boyfriend of her one and only rival, and she starts a plan to break them up. One day, she accidentally hits Yoon-jae's sister Yoon-hee, causing Yoon-hee to die. Yoo-ra, scared that she will go to jail and lose the trust from Yoon-jae, decides to team up with her father; the judge, and a police officer, and frame Yeon-hwa, Yeon-hwa is then framed for 3 years. Yoo-ra marries Yoon-jae thinks she can finally relax peacefully, but only until she finds out that Yeon-hwa had given birth to Yoon-jae's son. Thinking that she will once again lose her husband, she switches the identity of the baby at the orphanage, and send him to another couple, without anyone knowing. Later on, she finds out that Yeon-hwa is released from jail. From then on, she tries many ways to ruin Yeon-hwa, but most failed. She then starts losing Yoon-jae's attention, until she gets pregnant, and uses this to rub it in Yeon-hwa's face, as Yeon-hwa gets a fake death report of her child. But not for long, she has a miscarriage and blames Yeon-hwa for the loss of her baby. She also slowly becomes to be suspected by her husband and he secretly starts setting her up and testing her.

- Jung Chan as Choi Kang-wook

A kind and responsible son of Jang Min-ja; stepbrother of Yoon-jae, and Yeon-hwa's later on fiancé. He competes with Yoon-jae, with the help from his mother, and becomes the president of J Cosmetics. He secretly helps Yeon-hwa, and send her supporting notes when she is in jail, using the identity as Cho Ru-ba. He supports Yeon-hwa even after she is released from jail and does anything to help her. He falls for her genuinely and proposes her, which she agrees for the sake of her revenge. He finds out about Yeon-hwa's true feelings, but decides to still marry her, despite the fact she does not have true love feelings for him, but thanks him for helping her. He dies after saving Yeon-hwa's son. Yeon-hwa also finds out about Cho Ru-ba's true identity.

=== Supporting ===
- Min Ji-hyun as Seol Soo-ae, Yeon-hwa's sister

She has a small special-aid problem, and only listens to her sister and mother. She is scared of Jo Myung-tu, her step-grandma, and Yoo-ra. She believes in her sister's innocence, and helps her sister take care of her mother. Soo-ae also starts to have a close relationship with Kim Tae-il.

- Kim Young-ran as Han Kyung-sook

The beloved mother of Yeon-hwa and Soo-ae. She becomes In-seok's wife and Yoo-ra's stepmother. She has evidence to prove that Yoo-ra is the true murderer and that her daughter has been wrongly convicted, and In-seok had contributions to the plans. Because of these evidences, Yoo-ra had kidnapped Kyung-sook 2 times, leaving her hospitalized and disabled, for a while.

- Yoo Hye-ri as Jang Min-ja

The evil stepmother oh Yoon-jae and Yoon-hee, and the mother of Kang-wook. She was once a maid of the Ha family. One day, she sets up Joo Hye-ran, the wife of the Ha family, making it look like Hye-ran left her kids and husband for another guy. Thus, Min-ja seduces the chairman of J Cosmetics and becomes his wife and Yoon-jae/Yoon-hee's stepmother. She plans for her son Kang-wook to become the president of J Cosmetics. She also tries to win the trust of chairwoman Julia, who she has no idea that Julia is Hye-ran, coming back for revenge.

- Shim Eun-jin as Ha Yoon-hee
  - Lee Jae-in as young Ha Yoon-hee

The beloved sister of Yoon-jae, the team leader of J Cosmetics, and the girlfriend of Kim Tae-il, and is pregnant with his child. Because of her relationship with Tae-il, her brother Yoon-jae strongly disapproves. One day, Yoo-ra hits her with her car, and Yoon-hee dies. Before dying, she points to Yoo-ra, saying that she was the murderer, but everyone mistakens that she pointed to Yeon-hwa, thus, making Yeon-hwa the murderer.

- Kang Suk-jung as Kim Tae-il

The beloved boyfriend of Ha Yoon-hee. He believes that Yeon-hwa has caused Yoon-hee and his non born son's death, and thus uses power to get revenge. However, he slowly starts to believe that Yeon-hwa is innocent and starts to suspect Yoo-ra, and targets her police officer, the one who hid all the evidence. He also starts a close connection with Yeon-hwa's sister, Soo-ae.

- Choi Sang-hoon as Choi In-seok

Kyung-sook's husband, Yoo-ra's dad, Yeon-hwa's stepdad, and a court judge. To protect his daughter from being sentenced for murdering, he takes advantage on his position as a judge and teams up with Yoo-ra and Chang-do, and sentences Yeon-hwa. He knows most of Yoo-ra's wrongdoings, but stays quiet, thinking that is the way to protect his daughter. He later gets higher positions in society, which he used his power and the help of Yeon-hwa (this was one of her plans to revenge).

- Jung Hye-sun as Jo Myung-ru

The grandmother of Yoo-ra, and the mother of In-seok. She has no clue about Yoo-ra and In-seok's plans. She also dislikes Yeon-hwa, Kyung-sook, and Soo-ae.

- Jung Kyung-ho as Park Chang-do

The police officer, which Yoo-ra and In-seok bribed to hide all the evidence about the car accident. He is often bugged by Yoo-ra. He becomes Tae-il's target.

- Jo Kyung-hwan as Ha Myung-gook
- Ha Jae-sook as Kim Young-soon
- Hong Yeo-jin as Julia/Joo Hye-ran

The chairwoman. She is the biological mother of Yoon-jae and Yoon-hee, but was set up by Min-ja, and got into an accident. She plans to revenge on Min-ja. She also supports Yeon-hwa, and helps her with her revenge, believing that Yeon-hwa isn't the true murderer.

- Ham Jin-sung as Tae-il's subordinate
- Yoo Pil-ran as hairstyling instructor

== Reception ==
Ice Adonis topped the rating chart amongst other cable programs for 18 consecutive weeks, which resulted in its original run of 100 episodes being extended by eight more episodes. Distribution rights were later sold to Japan, Taiwan, Singapore, Philippines and Indonesia.
