= Yoon A-jung =

South Korean actress (born 1981)

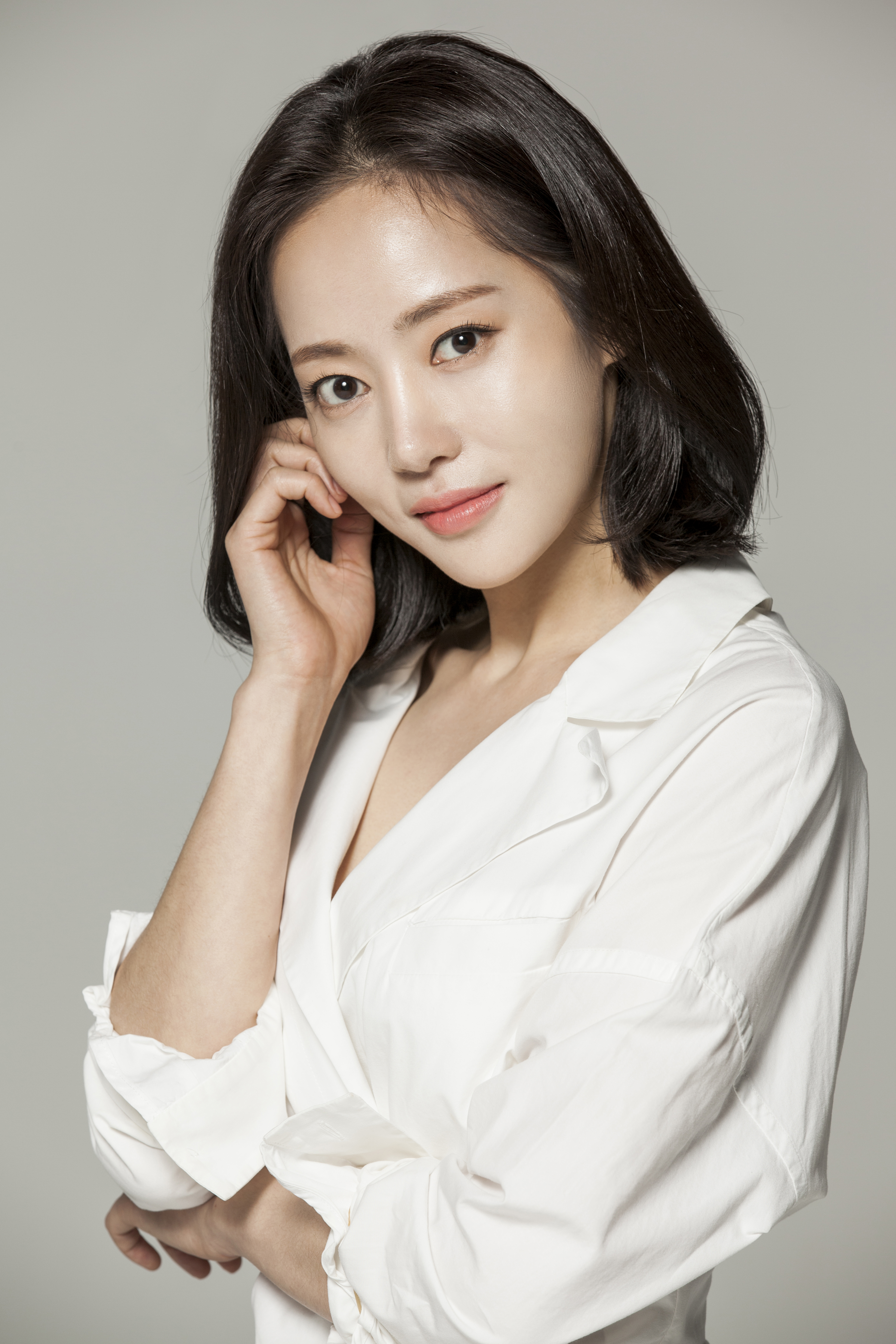
- Born: November 19, 1981 (age 44); Gwangju, South Korea
- Education: Kookmin University
- Occupation: Actress
- Years active: 2008–present
- Agent: EL Park

Korean name
- Hangul: 윤아정
- RR: Yun Ajeong
- MR: Yun Ajŏng

Yoon A-jung (Korean: 윤아정; born November 19, 1981) is a South Korean actress.

== Filmography ==
=== Television series ===
Year	Title	Role	Notes/Ref.
2008	Glass Castle	Lee Joo-hee	
2009	I'll Give You Everything	Cha Nam-joo	
2011	My Bittersweet Life	Hong Joo-mi	
2012	Ice Adonis	Choi Yoo-ra	
2012	Drama Special Series: "The Brightest Moment in Life"	Seo-jung	
2013	A Hundred Year Legacy	Kim Joo-ri	
2013	Empress Ki	Yeon-hwa	
2014	Temptation	Han Ji-sun	
2014	Rosy Lovers	Park Se-ra	
2016	That Sun in the Sky	Kang In-kyung	
2017	You Are Too Much	Go Na-kyung	
2019	Woman of 9.9 Billion	Yu Mi-ra	
2022	The Secret House	Woo Min-yeong	Cameo
2023	Pale Moon	So Mi-kyung	
2025	The Woman Who Swallowed the Sun	Min kyung-chae	

=== Film ===
Year	Title	Role
2008	The Moonlight of Seoul	Mi-seon

=== Variety show ===
Year	Title	Notes
2017	Live Talk Show Taxi	Guest with Eru (Episode 497)

== Awards and nominations ==
Year	Award	Category	Nominated work	Result
2014	3rd APAN Star Awards	Best Supporting Actress	Temptation, Empress Ki	Nominated
2016	KBS Drama Awards	Excellence Award, Actress in a Daily Drama	That Sun in the Sky	Nominated
2017	MBC Drama Awards	Golden Acting Award, Actress in a Weekend Drama	You Are Too Much	Nominated
2025	MBC Drama Awards	Excellence Award, Actress in a Daily/Short Drama	The Woman Who Swallowed the Sun	Won
