= Through the Waves =

2018 South Korean television series

- Promotional poster
- Hangul: 파도야 파도야
- Hanja: 波濤야 波濤야
- RR: Padoya padoya
- MR: P'adoya p'adoya
- Genre: Period drama; Romance; Family
- Written by: Lee Hyun-jae; Lee Hwang-won
- Directed by: Lee Duk-gun
- Creative director: Lee Dae-kyung
- Starring: Ah Young; Park Jung-wook; Jay Kim; Jang Jae-ho; Seo Ha; Noh Haeng-ha; Kim Jung-heon; Jung Yoon-hye
- Country of origin: South Korea
- Original language: Korean
- No. of episodes: 143

Production
- Executive producer: Lee Gun-joon
- Producer: Park Man-young
- Running time: 40 min
- Production company: KBS Drama Production

Original release
- Network: KBS2
- Release: February 12 – August 31, 2018

Through the Waves (Korean: 파도야 파도야) is a 2018 South Korea morning soap opera starring Ah Young, Park Jung-wook, Jay Kim, Jang Jae-ho, Seo Ha, Noh Haeng-ha, Kim Jung-heon, and Jung Yoon-hye. It aired on KBS2 from February 12, 2018 to August 31, 2018.

It is the 44th and the final TV Novel series (13th in 2010s) of KBS. It is also the lowest-rated TV Novel series, averaging only 7.4% and hitting a peak of 10.4%, according to AGB Nielsen's nationwide ratings.

== Plot ==
This is a family drama which tells the story of a family of five women who lost their property and became separated after the war.

== Cast ==
=== Main ===
- Ah Young as Oh Bok-shil/Oh Se-ra, the only daughter in the Oh household who becomes a singer named Oh Se-ra in order to look for her missing father.
  - Jo Ye-rin as young Oh Bok-shil
- Park Jung-wook as Han Kyung-ho, Bok-shil's childhood friend and Daeguk Construction employee who realizes his feelings for her.
  - Park Ha-joon as young Han Kyung-ho
- Jay Kim as Cha Sang-pil, the chief executive officer of Lucky Entertainment and an orphan who becomes insecure of his position in the Hwang household that adopted him.
- Jang Jae-ho as Oh Jung-hoon, the eldest of the Oh brood who shoulders the burden of being the man of the household and fails in his dreams of becoming a lawyer.
  - Kwon Mi-reu as young Oh Jung-hoon
- Seo Ha as Uhm Soon-young, Jung-hoon's girlfriend of four years whom he had to abandon to marry a rich woman.
- Noh Haeng-ha as Hwang Mi-jin, the daughter of construction magnate Hwang Chang-shik whom Jung-hoon marries to get a better chance in life.
  - Lee Yoo-joo as young Hwang Mi-jin
- Kim Jung-heon as Oh Jung-tae, the second son of the Oh family who could not go to school and could only live a poor and violent life.
  - Lee Hyun-bin as young Oh Jung-tae
- Jung Yoon-hye as Kim Choon-ja, the Oh siblings' childhood friend and neighbor who insistently clings onto her longtime crush, Jung-tae.

=== Supporting ===
==== Oh Family ====
- Lee Kyung-jin as Lee Ok-boon, the mother of the Oh siblings who lost her husband during the war and was forced to make difficult decisions to survive.
- Ban Hyo-jung as Hong Ki-jun, the grandmother of the Oh siblings who lives with the guilt of losing her son's riches during the war and plunging their family into poverty.
- Lee Si-hoo as Oh Jung-woo, the youngest of the Oh siblings whose leg becomes lame in a childhood accident.
  - Jung Hyeon-jun as young Oh Jung-woo

==== Sohyun-dong Neighbors ====
- Kyun Oh-hyun as Han Cheon-sam, Kyung-ho's father who works as a musician for the Golden Carriage Cabaret.
- Lee Kyung-sil as Yang Mal-soon, Kyung-ho's mother who is a seamstress and holds a tight leash on the household.
- Jung Sung-ho as Kim Sang-man, Choon-ja's father who works for the government and helps the Oh family settle into the poor Seoul neighborhood of Sohyun-dong.

==== Daeguk Construction ====
- Sunwoo Jae-duk as Hwang Chang-sik, the Chairman of Daeguk Construction whose wealth was secretly built on the stolen riches of the Oh family.
- Sung Hyun-ah as Cheon Geum-geum, Chang-shik's nosy and haughty wife.

==== Golden Carriage Cabaret ====
- Lee Joo-hyun as Cho Dong-chul, chief executive officer of Golden Carriage Cabaret who runs a gang of thugs and does dirty work for Hwang Chang-shik.
- Park Seon-young as Gu Mi-shim, Soon-young's aunt who initially opposes her relationship with Jung-hoon.
- Song Young-jae as Johnny Kim, Han Cheon-sam's musical partner who influences his gambling addiction.
- Nam Tae-woo as Park Yong-chil, Dong-chul's lackey.

==== Lucky Entertainment ====
- Kim Min-seon as Oh Hae-rin, the daughter of a rich ally of Hwang Chang-shik and Bok-shil's fellow singer trainee who has a crush on Kyung-ho.
- Seo Jae-won as Heo Jin-gyu, Sang-pil's employee.

==== Extended ====
- Kim Kwang-tae as
- Lee Jin-mok
- Jo Hee
- Kang Jae-eun
- Lee Yoon-sang
- Goo Jung-rim
- Lee Ye-rin

== Original soundtrack ==
Through the Waves OST

Soundtrack album by Various artists
- Genre: Soundtrack
- Languages: Korean; English
- Label: LOEN Entertainment

=== Part 1 ===
Released on March 19, 2018
No.	Title	Lyrics	Music	Artist	Length
1.	"The Road To You" (그대에게 가는 길)	Lee Ji-yoon	Blue Ocean	Cha Soo-kyung	3:04
2.	"The Road To You" (Inst.)		Blue Ocean		3:04
Total length:					6:08

=== Part 2 ===
Released on April 5, 2018
No.	Title	Lyrics	Music	Artist	Length
1.	"Fate" (인연)	Hwi Jang-nam, Choi Chul-ho, Miss Kim	Hwi Jang-nim, Miss Kim	Dong Woo	3:10
2.	"Fate" (Inst.)		Hwi Jang-nim, Miss Kim		3:10
Total length:					6:20

=== Part 3 ===
Released on April 27, 2018
No.	Title	Lyrics	Music	Artist	Length
1.	"Pinwheel" (바람개비)	Kim Jong-chul	Choi Chul-ho, Kim Jong-chul	Ah Young	2:57
2.	"Pinwheel" (Inst.)		Choi Chul-ho, Kim Jong-chul		2:57
Total length:					5:54

== Ratings ==
- In this table, The blue numbers represent the lowest ratings and the red numbers represent the highest ratings.
- NR denotes that the drama did not rank in the top 20 daily programs on that date.

Ep.	Original broadcast date	Average audience share		
Ep.	Original broadcast date	AGB Nielsen ratings		TNmS ratings
Ep.	Original broadcast date	Nationwide	Seoul National Capital Area	Nationwide
001	February 12, 2018	7.8% (15th)	6.9% (16th)	10.1% (7th)
002	February 13, 2018	7.5% (14th)	6.6% (14th)	9.4% (9th)
003	February 14, 2018 (Note: Episodes 1-3 were aired 10 minutes late at 9:10 a.m. due to the 2018 Winter Olympics.)	7.4% (17th)	7.0% (17th)	7.7% (17th)
004	February 15, 2018 (Note: Episodes scheduled to air on February 15 and 16 were pushed back due to the 2018 Winter Olympics.)	8.0% (17th)	6.5% (18th)	9.2% (14th)
005	February 16, 2018	7.4% (16th)	6.2% (18th)	10.3% (10th)
006	February 19, 2018	7.5% (12th)	6.7% (12th)	9.0% (11th)
007	February 20, 2018	5.8% (20th)	NR	8.2% (NR)
008	February 21, 2018	6.3% (15th)	5.3% (19th)	8.5% (11th)
009	February 22, 2018	7.7% (18th)	7.2% (17th)	9.2% (14th)
010	February 23, 2018	7.3% (17th)	6.4% (20th)	9.7% (12th)
011	February 26, 2018	6.8% (18th)	NR	9.3% (14th)
012	February 27, 2018	7.8% (15th)	6.8% (18th)	11.5% (9th)
013	February 28, 2018	7.7% (15th)	7.0% (17th)	9.9% (12th)
014	March 1, 2018	8.2%	NR	11.1%
015	March 2, 2018	7.3%	6.1%	9.7%
016	March 5, 2018	6.8%	6.0%	10.3%
017	March 6, 2018	7.3%	6.0%	10.8%
018	March 7, 2018	2.5%	NR	7.7%
019	March 8, 2018	6.7%	NR	10.0%
020	March 9, 2018	6.9%	6.1%	9.6%
021	March 12, 2018	4.7%	NR	6.4%
022	March 13, 2018	6.5%	NR	8.6%
023	March 14, 2018	7.7%	6.6%	10.3%
024	March 15, 2018	7.1%	NR	9.1%
025	March 19, 2018	6.8%	NR	10.2%
026	March 19, 2018	6.3%	NR	10.4%
027	March 20, 2018	7.1%	6.3%	9.6%
028	March 21, 2018	7.0%	NR	10.1%
029	March 22, 2018	6.6%	NR	9.3%
030	March 23, 2018	6.8%	NR	9.7%
031	March 26, 2018	6.5%	NR	8.9%
032	March 27, 2018	7.5%	6.8%	9.9%
033	March 28, 2018	7.0%	6.3%	9.3%
034	March 29, 2018	7.2%	6.3%	8.5%
035	March 30, 2018	6.9%	5.9%	9.0%
036	March 31, 2018	6.6%	6.2%	9.3%
037	April 2, 2018	7.1%	6.3%	10.8%
038	April 3, 2018	6.8%	5.5%	10.6%
039	April 4, 2018	5.8%	NR	8.4%
040	April 5, 2018	6.5%	NR	7.9%
041	April 6, 2018	6.6%	5.8%	8.8%
042	April 9, 2018	7.6%	7.0%	9.0%
043	April 10, 2018	6.7%	6.0%	8.7%
044	April 11, 2018	5.9%	NR	7.8%
045	April 12, 2018	6.6%	5.3%	8.5%
046	April 13, 2018	6.9%	5.5%	8.7%
047	April 16, 2018	7.0%	6.0%	10.0%
048	April 17, 2018	7.5%	6.6%	9.7%
049	April 18, 2018	7.2%	NR	10.7%
050	April 19, 2018	7.5%	5.6%	10.6%
051	April 20, 2018	6.8%	5.7%	8.6%
052	April 23, 2018	6.8%	5.7%	9.0%
053	April 24, 2018	3.6% (19th)	NR	4.7%
054	April 25, 2018	6.8%	NR	9.4%
055	April 26, 2018	7.7%	6.7%	10.5%
056	April 27, 2018	7.7%	7.2%	8.8%
057	April 30, 2018	7.4%	6.3%	9.2%
058	May 1, 2018	7.2%	6.2%	8.7%
059	May 2, 2018	7.0%	6.2%	8.8%
060	May 3, 2018	6.8%	5.7%	8.2%
061	May 4, 2018	6.7%	5.8%	8.6%
062	May 7, 2018	7.1%	6.0%	8.7%
063	May 8, 2018	7.3%	6.6%	8.4%
064	May 9, 2018	6.3%	NR	8.8%
065	May 10, 2018	6.0%	NR	7.6%
066	May 11, 2018	6.6%	6.1%	8.6%
067	May 14, 2018	7.0%	6.3%	9.2%
068	May 15, 2018	7.5%	6.6%	10.5%
069	May 16, 2018	5.7%	NR	8.0%
070	May 17, 2018	6.4%	NR	6.7%
071	May 18, 2018	6.6%	6.0%	9.3%
072	May 21, 2018	6.9%	6.0%	8.8%
073	May 22, 2018	6.4%	5.4%	9.6%
074	May 23, 2018	6.6%	NR	8.2%
075	May 24, 2018	6.8%	5.7%	9.4%
076	May 25, 2018	6.5%	5.6%	9.1%
077	May 28, 2018	6.2%	5.9%	9.8%
078	May 29, 2018	6.8%	6.3%	9.2%
079	May 30, 2018	7.0%	6.3%	8.4%
080	May 31, 2018	6.6%	5.6%	9.0%
081	June 4, 2018	7.5%	7.1%	8.7%
082	June 5, 2018	6.7%	6.1%	8.5%
083	June 6, 2018	7.4%	6.6%	8.8%
084	June 7, 2018	7.3%	6.5%	9.8%
085	June 8, 2018	5.3%	5.0%	7.3%
086	June 11, 2018	7.0%	6.3%	9.0%
087	June 12, 2018	7.2%	6.6%	9.6%
088	June 13, 2018	6.9%	6.0%	10.5%
089	June 14, 2018	6.9%	6.3%	8.4%
090	June 15, 2018	7.3%	6.3%	9.2%
091	June 18, 2018	6.9%	6.3%	8.6%
092	June 19, 2018	7.9%	6.8%	9.8%
093	June 20, 2018	8.3%	7.3%	10.2%
094	June 21, 2018	7.6%	6.3%	9.4%
095	June 22, 2018	8.8%	7.9%	10.5%
096	June 25, 2018	8.9%	7.8%	10.7%
097	June 26, 2018	7.8%	6.6%	10.4%
098	June 27, 2018	8.2%	7.3%	10.7%
099	June 28, 2018	7.7%	NR	11.0%
100	June 29, 2018	7.9%	6.7%	10.7%
101	July 2, 2018	7.2%	6.3%	9.2%
102	July 3, 2018	7.8%	6.2%	10.4%
103	July 4, 2018	7.7%	6.2%	10.1%
104	July 5, 2018	7.8%	NR	8.9%
105	July 6, 2018	7.6%	6.4%	10.0%
106	July 9, 2018	7.8%	7.0%	10.5%
107	July 10, 2018	8.1%	6.8%	10.4%
108	July 11, 2018	8.5%	7.1%	11.0%
109	July 12, 2018	7.4%	NR	9.1%
110	July 13, 2018	7.7%	6.0%	10.1%
111	July 16, 2018	6.5%	5.6%	9.8%
112	July 17, 2018	7.6%	6.7%	10.4%
113	July 18, 2018	7.7%	6.3%	10.5%
114	July 19, 2018	8.4%	7.3%	10.1%
115	July 20, 2018	8.5%	7.6%	NR
116	July 23, 2018	7.5%	6.4%	9.5%
117	July 24, 2018	7.6%	6.4%	10.3%
118	July 25, 2018	7.8%	6.5%	10.4%
119	July 26, 2018	7.8%	6.8%	9.3%
120	July 27, 2018	8.0%	6.5%	9.0%
121	July 30, 2018	8.4%	7.6%	9.9%
122	July 31, 2018	8.0%	6.8%	8.6%
123	August 2, 2018	9.6%	8.4%	8.7%
124	August 3, 2018	8.4%	7.3%	9.4%
125	August 6, 2018	9.2%	7.9%	10.2%
126	August 7, 2018	8.4%	6.9%	10.1%
127	August 8, 2018	8.8%	7.5%	10.7%
128	August 9, 2018	9.0%	7.4%	11.8%
129	August 10, 2018	8.7%	7.7%	10.7%
130	August 13, 2018	8.6%	7.5%	10.6%
131	August 14, 2018	8.4%	7.3%	9.8%
132	August 15, 2018	9.1%	7.8%	10.7%
133	August 16, 2018	8.8%	7.4%	10.6%
134	August 17, 2018	8.3%	7.1%	
135	August 20, 2018	9.1%	8.0%	10.9%
136	August 21, 2018	8.6%	7.7%	9.9%
137	August 22, 2018	10.3% (7th)	8.9% (8th)	
138	August 23, 2018	9.7%	8.1%	
139	August 24, 2018	9.2%	7.6%	
140	August 27, 2018	9.0%	6.9%	
141	August 28, 2018	8.8%	7.2%	
142	August 29, 2018	9.8%	8.1%	
143	August 30, 2018	10.4% (6th)	8.3% (9th)	
Average ratings		7.4%	%	%
