= Hyun Woo-sung =

South Korean actor

Hyun Woo-Sung
- Born: March 16, 1979 (age 47); South Korea
- Education: Seoul National University of Science and Technology – Materials Science and Engineering
- Occupation: Actor
- Years active: 2010–present

Korean name
- Hangul: 현우성
- RR: Hyeon Useong
- MR: Hyŏn Usŏng

Hyun Woo-Sung (born March 16, 1979) is a South Korean actor.

== Filmography ==
=== Television series ===
| Year | Title | Role |
|---|---|---|
| 2010 | Three Sisters | Lee Min-Chul |
| 2011 | You Are So Pretty | Byun Kang-Soo |
| 2011 | Heaven's Garden | Shin Woo-Gyun |
| 2012 | Ice Adonis | Ha Yoon-Jae |
| 2014 | The Noblesse | Han Jung-Min |
| 2014 | Two Mothers | Lee Myung-Woon |
| 2014 | Stormy Woman | Park Hyun-Woo |
| 2016 | Good Person | Suk Ji-Wan |
| 2018 | Sweet Revenge 2 | Sa Gi Jun |
| 2019 | Graceful Family | Joo Tae-Hyeong |
| 2021 | Love Scene Number | Han Myung-hoon |
| 2021 | The Road: The Tragedy of One | Jo Sang-mu |
| 2022 | Rookie Cops | Kang Nam-gi |
