= Kim Jung-heon =

South Korean actor

- Born: 3 May 1987 (age 39); Seoul, South Korea
- Occupation: Actor
- Years active: 2006–present
- Agent: Blue Dragon Entertainment
- Known for: No Matter What; Secrets of Women; Through the Waves

Kim Jung-heon is a South Korean actor. He is known for his roles in dramas such as No Matter What, Through the Waves, Golden Cross and Secrets of Women.

== Filmography ==
=== Television series ===
Year	Title	Role	Ref.
2006	I Am a Model Men	Himself	
2011	I Believed in Men	Han Jung-heon	
2011	Run 60	Ghost	
2012	KBS Drama Special: My Wife Natree's First Love	Jeong Eun-woo	
2014	Golden Cross	Alex	
2015	She Was Pretty	Se-hoon	
2016	Time of Miracle: Loss Time	Kim Yeong-cheol	
2016	Secrets of Women	Min Seon-ho	
2018	Through the Waves	Oh Jeong-tae	
2018	My Only One	Seung-joon	
2020	No Matter What	Na Joon-soon	
2021	Revolutionary Sisters	Jin Jeong-han	
2022	The Secret House	Nam Tae-hyung	
2023	The Killing Vote	Oh Jeong-ho	
2023	Moon in the Day	Gu Tae-joo	
2024	Bitter Sweet Hell	Gu Kyung-tae	
2025	The Manipulated	TBA	

=== Film ===
Year	Title	Role
2006	Arang	Detective
2007	The Perfect Couple	Handsome boy
2008	Antique	Pretty worker
2009	Flight	Amazonness Si-bum host
2010	Come, Closer	Yeong-soo's friend
2011	Mama	Min-hyeok
2012	Hoya	Il-kang
2014	Take Out	Yong-min
2014	Manshin: Ten Thousand Spirits	Mountain Spirit
2015	Mission, Steal the Top Star	Hong Min-woo
2017	The Tooth and the Nail	Detective Lee Jin-woo

=== Music video appearances ===
Year	Title	Artist
2006	"Unbelievable"	Park Han-geun
2007	"If It Were A Dream"	Danny Ahn
2007	"Christmas Story"	SG Wannabe
2010	"Don't Go"	Zia
2014	"Winter of Haeundae"	Zizo
2020	"Don't Come Back"	Hong Chang-woo

== Theatre ==
Year	Title	Korean Title	Role	Ref.
2014	Flower Boy Bath	꽃미남탕	Man-yong	
