= Son Se-bin =

South Korean actress (born 1989)

- 손세빈
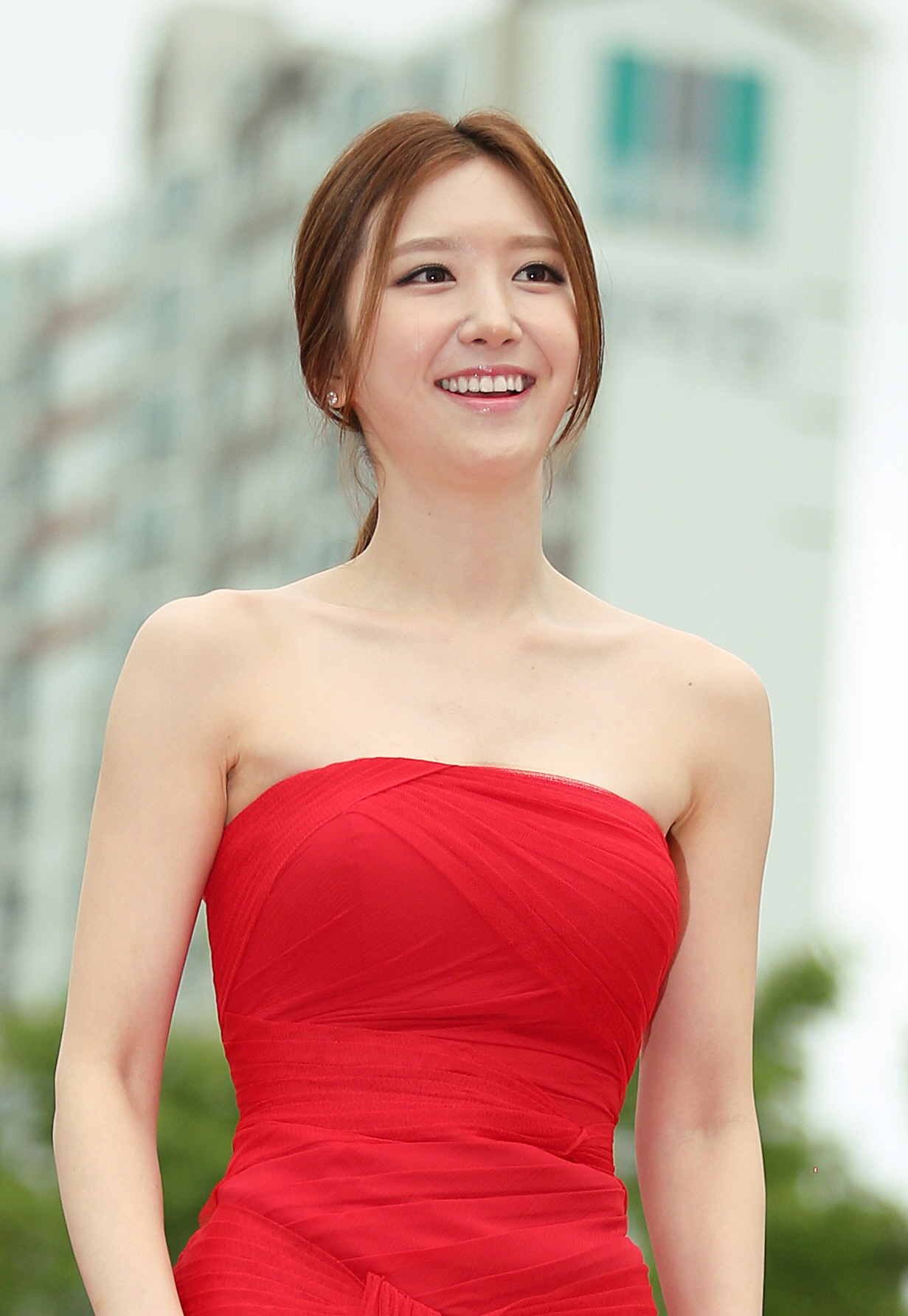
- Son at the red carpet event of the Pifan in Bucheon on July 17, 2014
- Born: May 27, 1989 (age 37); Seoul, South Korea
- Occupation: Actress
- Years active: 2005–present
- Agent: Wooridle Company

Korean name
- Hangul: 손세빈
- RR: Son Sebin
- MR: Son Sebin

Son Se-bin (Korean: 손세빈, born May 27, 1989) is a South Korean actress.

== Biography ==
Son debuted as an actress in the small screen under the name Lee Yoo-na in the 2004 SBS TV series Island Village Teacher. However, her official debut was in 2010 SBS TV series Three Sisters. She then appeared in minor roles in the TV series Coffee House, and the films You're My Pet and City in Blossom. In 2012, Son changed her name from Lee Yoo-na to Son Se-bin, and appeared on the film China Blue using her new name. Following her appearances in the two 2013 SBS TV series, Two Women's Room and One Well-Raised Daughter, which established her career as an actress, she signed a contract with Diorgol Entertainment in 2014.

In 2015, Son appeared in a Clarisonic television commercial.

In 2016, Son signed an exclusive modeling contract with YGKPlus, and participated in 2017 as a runway model at the 2018 S/S Seoul Fashion Week for Moon Jung-wook's brand, Nineteeneighty, collection.

In 2019, she signed an exclusive contract with Wooridle Company. During the 2020 S/S Seoul Fashion Week, Son appeared as the opening model for Nineteeneighty's collection.

== Filmography ==
=== Film ===
Year	Title	Role	Ref.
2004	My Mother the Mermaid		
2005	Jump	Lee Yoo-na	
2007	The Elephant on the Bike		
2007	The Show Must Go On		
2011	You're My Pet	Kim Ji-young	
2011	City in Blossom	Han Mi-yoo	
2012	China Blue	Joo-won	
2014	Man in Love	Hye-kyung	

=== Television series ===
Year	Title	Role	Notes	Ref.
2004	Island Village Teacher			
2010	Three Sisters			
2010	Coffee House			
2013	Two Women's Room	Jin Soo-hee		
2013	One Well-Raised Daughter	Eun So-yeon		
2014	Gunman in Joseon	Myung-wol	Special appearance	
2014	Bad Guys	Jung Hon-ja		
2014	The Greatest Marriage	Kang Ha-ni		
2014	Love & Secret	Heo Anna		
2015	A Girl Who Sees Smells	Driver's girlfriend	Special appearance	
2015	Divorce Lawyer in Love	Go Mi-hee		
2015	KBS Drama Special: "Prince's Prince"	Hyang-dan		
2016	I Have a Lover	Ha Se-joon		
2017	Blow Breeze	Rest stop woman	Special appearance	
2018	Something in the Rain			
2019	Touch Your Heart	Kim Min-ji		
2025	The Woman Who Swallowed the Sun	Oh Ja-kyeong		

=== Web series ===
Year	Title	Role	Notes	Ref.
2018	YG Future Strategy Office	Herself	Sitcom	

== Awards ==
Year	Award	Category	Nominated work	Results	Ref.
2012	Eco-Friendly Ambassadors Contest	Miss Eco Queen	—N/a	Won	
