= Seo Ha-joon =

South Korean actor (born 1989)

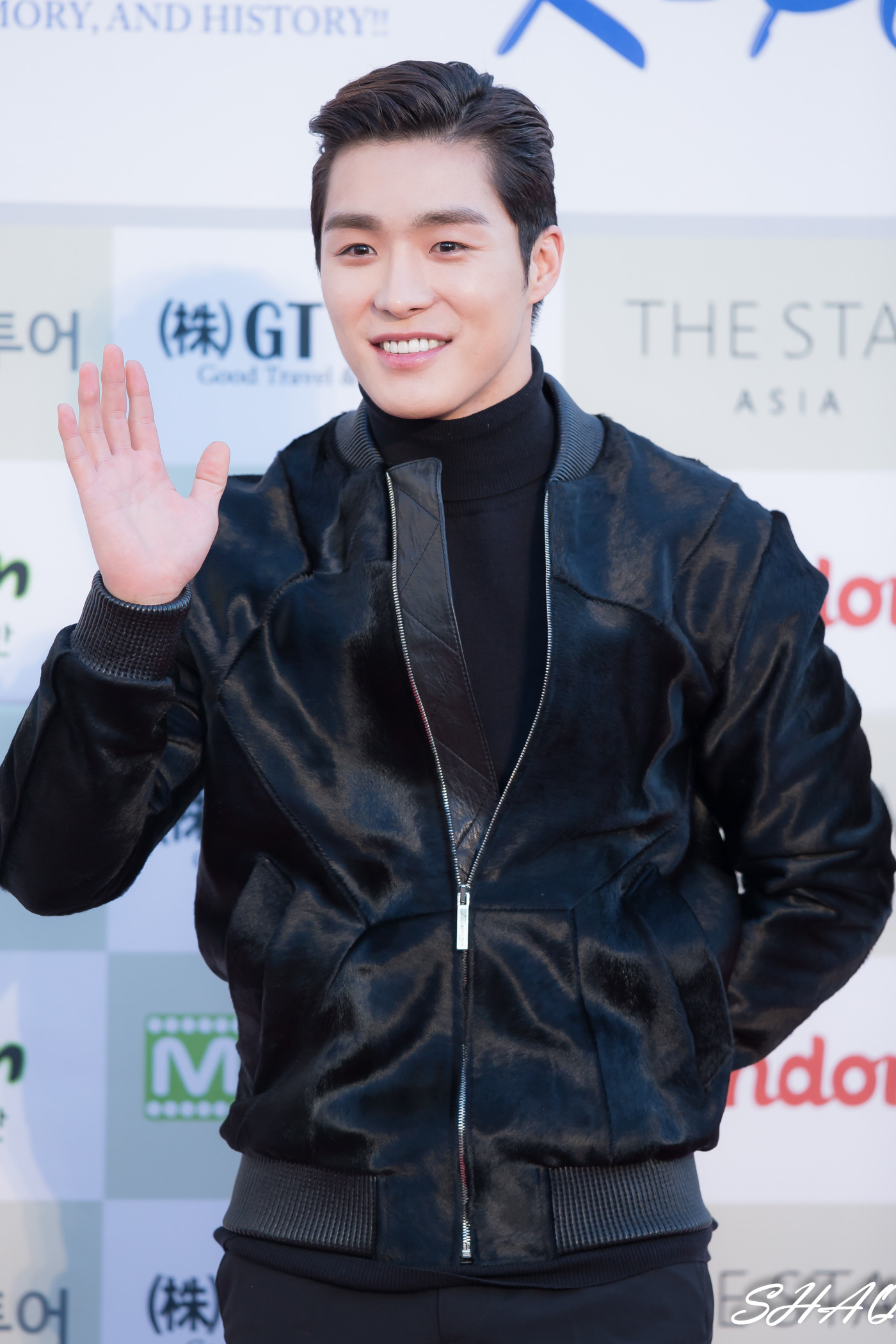
- Seo in February 2016
- Born: September 19, 1989 (age 37); Seoul, South Korea
- Occupation: Actor
- Years active: 2013–present
- Agent: Bless ENT

Korean name
- Hangul: 서하준
- RR: Seo Hajun
- MR: Sŏ Hajun

Seo Ha-joon (Korean: 서하준; born September 19, 1989) is a South Korean actor.

== Filmography ==
=== Television series ===
Year	Title	Role
2013	Princess Aurora	Seol Seol-hee
2014	Only Love	Kim Tae-yang
2016	Marrying My Daughter Twice	Kim Hyun-tae
2016	Flowers of the Prison	King Myeongjong
2019–2020	Want a Taste?	Lee Jin-sang
2020–2021	Phoenix 2020	Seo Jung-min
2022	The Secret House	Woo Ji-hwan

=== Film ===
Year	Title	Role
2014	Goodbye...and Hello	Lee Do-wan

=== Variety show ===
Year	Title	Role	Notes
2014	Law of the Jungle in Borneo	Cast member	Episodes 100-107
2016	King of Mask Singer	Contestant	as "Adults Don't Know Peterpan", episode 81

== Musical theatre ==
Title	Year	Role
Dead Poets Society	2008	
Full House	2014	Lee Young-jae
Cafe-in	2014	Kang Ji-min

== Awards and nominations ==
Year	Award	Category	Nominated work	Result
2014	SBS Drama Awards	New Star Award	Only Love	Won
2016	SBS Drama Awards	Special Award, Actor in a Serial Drama	Marrying My Daughter Twice	Nominated
2016	9th Korea Drama Awards	Best New Actor	The Flower in Prison	Won
2016	MBC Drama Awards	Excellence Award, Actor in a Special Project Drama	The Flower in Prison	Won
2016	MBC Drama Awards	Best Couple Award	Seo Ha-joon (with Jin Se-yeon); The Flower in Prison	Nominated
2019	SBS Drama Awards	Top Excellence Award, Actor in a Long Drama	Want a Taste?	Nominated
2020	SBS Drama Awards	Excellence Award, Actor in a Mid/Long-length Drama	Phoenix 2020	Nominated
2022	MBC Drama Awards	Excellence Award, Actor in a Daily/Short Drama	The Secret House	Won
2025	APAN Star Awards	Excellence Award, Actor in a Serial Drama	The Woman Who Swallowed the Sun	Won
