= Yoon Bok-in =

South Korean actress (born 1970)

- Born: December 16, 1970 (age 55); Dongducheon, South Korea
- Occupations: Actress; theater actor
- Years active: 1990–present
- Agent: Star Weave Entertainment

Korean name
- Hangul: 윤복인
- Hanja: 尹福仁
- RR: Yun Bokin
- MR: Yun Pogin

Yoon Bok-in (Korean: 윤복인; born on 16 December 1970) is a South Korean actress. She made her acting debut in 1990 in theater, since then, she has appeared in number of plays, films and television series. She got recognition for her supporting roles in Suspicious Partner (2017), Train (2020), and Hello, Me! (2021). She has acted in films such as: Crossing (2008) and Rosebud (2019) among others.

== Career ==
Yoon Bok-in is affiliated to artist management company Star Weave Entertainment since February 2022, which has acquired Entertainment O, to which she was originally affiliated.

On August 15, 2018 Yoon participated as a narrator in the 2018 Korean National Choir Festival creative cantata 'Song in the Wilderness' held at the Seoul Arts Center.

In 2020, Yoon appeared in OCN's TV series Train, a fantasy thriller set in parallel universes.

In 2021, she was cast in KBS fantasy rom-com Hello, Me! and tvN's crime drama Vincenzo portraying mother of the protagonists.

In 2022, she is seen in MBC's daily drama The Secret House portraying mother of the main lead.

== Filmography ==
=== Films ===
Year	Title	Role	Notes	Ref.
2006	Family Matters			
2008	Crossing	Baby's mother		
2014	Innocent Thing	Obstetrics and gynecology nurse		
2019	Rosebud	Mi-ran		
2022	Good Morning	Fishing hole patient	Special appearance	
TBA	The Accident			

=== Television series ===
Year	Title	Role	Notes	Ref.
2013	The End of the World	Park Joo-hee		
2014	Secret Affair	Yoon Ji-soo		
2014	Drama Festival: "Fitting"	Kyeong-hee's mother	Episode 1	
2015	Heard It Through the Grapevine	Kim Jin-ae		
2015	Assembly	Oh Ae-ri		
2015	My Daughter, Geum Sa-wol	Yoo Kwon-soon		
2016	Cheese in the Trap	Kim Young-hee		
2016	The Promise	Yang Mal-sook		
2016	My Lawyer, Mr. Jo	Jung Se-mi		
2016	Secret Healer	Mrs. Ok	Special appearance	
2016–2017	That Sun in the Sky	Park Mal-soon		
2016–2017	Night Light	Kim Hwa-sook		
2017	The Happy Loner	Na Ji-young's mother		
2017	Suspicious Partner	Park Young-soon		
2017	Lovers in Bloom	Lee Sun-ok		
2017	Children of the 20th Century	Yoon Bok-in, A-reum's mother		
2017–2018	Oh, the Mysterious	Yoo Kwang-mi		
2018	Sunny Again Tomorrow	Lim Eun-ae		
2018	Sketch	Oh Yeong-sim's mother	Special appearance	
2019	Top Star U-back	Yoo Baek's mother		
2019	Blessing of the Sea	Jung Moo-shim		
2019	Suspicious Mother-in-law	Ji Hwa-ja		
2019	I Wanna Hear Your Song	Park Yeong-hee		
2019	The Lies Within	Kim Seo-hee's mother		
2019–2020	Hot Stove League	Jeong Mi-sook		
2020	Forest			
2020	Fatal Promise	Go Jae-sook		
2020	Dinner Mate	Jun Sung-ja		
2020	Train	Jo Young-ran		
2020	More Than Friends	JTBC		
2020	KBS Drama Special: "The Reason Why I Can't Tell You"		Season 11, Episode 5	
2021	So I Married the Anti-fan	Jang Hwa-jeong		
2021	Hello, Me!	Ji Ok-jung		
2021	Vincenzo	Oh Gyeong-ja		
2021	Idol: The Coup	Dr. Cha Mi-yeon		
2021–2022	The One and Only	Hong Jang-mi		
2022	Forecasting Love and Weather	Chae Yoo-jin's mother	Special appearance	
2022	The Secret House	Kim Kyung-sun		
2022	It's Beautiful Now	Jeong Myeong-hee (VIP client)	Cameo	
2022	Cheer Up	Jeong Seon-hye		
2023	Agency	Park Kyung-sook		
2023–2024	Korea–Khitan War	Gang Gam-chan's wife		
2024	No Gain No Love	Lee Eun-ok		
2024	My Merry Marriage	Maeng Gyeong-bok		

=== Theater ===
Year	Title	Role	Ref.
2005	Seagull		
2008	Seoul Theater Festival - Railroad		
2008	Soft store: Creative Praise	Okja	
2009	Three Sisters	Irina	
2010	Rhino's Love	mukja	
2012	Cleveland in the Rain	Production	
2014	On a Starry Night	Gangnammi	

=== Web series ===
Year	Title	Role	Ref.
2021	Work Later, Drink Now	Kang Ji-goo's mother	
