= That Sun in the Sky =

2016 South Korean television series

- Promotional poster
- Also known as: Reaching for the Stars
- Hangul: 저 하늘에 태양이
- RR: Jeo haneure taeyangi
- MR: Chŏ hanŭre t'aeyangi
- Genre: Family; Melodrama; Period drama Comedy; Romance
- Written by: Kim Ji-wan; Lee Jin-suk
- Directed by: Kim Shin-il
- Creative director: Yoo Kwan-mo
- Starring: Yoon A-jung; Lee Min-woo; Noh Young-hak; Kim Hye-ji
- Music by: Lee Chang-hee
- Country of origin: South Korea
- Original language: Korean
- No. of episodes: 121

Production
- Executive producer: Choi Ji-young
- Producer: Hwang Seung-ki
- Running time: 40 min
- Production company: KBS Drama Production

Original release
- Network: KBS
- Release: September 7, 2016 – February 24, 2017

That Sun in the Sky (Korean: 저 하늘에 태양이) is a 2016 South Korea morning soap opera starring Yoon A-jung, Lee Min-woo, Noh Young-hak, Kim Hye-ji. It aired on KBS2 from September 7, 2016 on Mondays to Fridays at 09:00 for 121 episodes.

It is the 41st TV Novel series (10th in 2010s) of KBS.

== Summary ==
This series depicts the process of a pure countryside woman overcoming many obstacles, and growing into the best actor in Korea in the 1970s.

== Cast ==
=== Main ===
- Yoon A-jung as Kang In-kyung
- Lee Min-woo as Nam Jung-ho
- Noh Young-hak as Cha Min-woo / Kim Shin-woo
- Kim Hye-ji as Nam Hee-ae

=== Supporting ===
==== People around In-kyung ====
- Oh Seung-yoon as Kang Han-soo
- Yoon Bok-in as Park Mal-soon

==== People at Ran-guk Dong ====
- Han Ga-rim as Bae Choon-ja
- Han Ji-an as Oh Kim-soon
- Kim Seung-dae as Heo Chil-bong

==== Baedo Film Studio ====
- Ban Min-jung as Yoon Mi-hee
- Ha Jee-un as Lee Seo-yeon
- Lee Jae-yong as Nam Tae-joon
- Hyun Chul-ho as Kim Choong-seok

==== Seongri Transport ====
- Choi Joon-yong as Lee Hyung-ok
- Kim Kyu-chul as Byun Geun-tae
- Park Kyung-hye as Go Sung-ran
- Jang Tae-sung as Ma Chul-hee
- Lee Myung-ho as Im Hee-sang

== Ratings ==
- In this table, The blue numbers represent the lowest ratings and the red numbers represent the highest ratings.
- NR denotes that the drama did not rank in the top 20 daily programs on that date.

Ep.	Original broadcast date	Average audience share			
Ep.	Original broadcast date	TNmS Ratings		AGB Nielsen	
Ep.	Original broadcast date	Nationwide	Seoul National Capital Area	Nationwide	Seoul National Capital Area
1	September 7, 2016	10.4% (9th)	8.5% (15th)	7.8% (17th)	NR
2	September 8, 2016	2.5% (NR)	NR	2.4% (NR)	NR
3	September 9, 2016	10.7% (7th)	8.9% (10th)	8.0% (12th)	7.0% (17th)
4	September 12, 2016	10.9% (11th)	8.4% (18th)	7.7% (NR)	NR
5	September 13, 2016	9.2% (13th)	7.4% (16th)	7.9% (14th)	7.2% (19th)
6	September 14, 2016	7.9% (18th)	NR	6.5% (NR)	NR
7	September 19, 2016	9.3% (15th)	NR	7.9% (16th)	7.1% (19th)
8	September 20, 2016	10.0% (13th)	8.7% (14th)	7.4% (19th)	NR
9	September 21, 2016	9.6% (12th)	8.3% (13th)	6.9% (NR)	NR
10	September 22, 2016	9.6% (11th)	7.9% (13th)	7.6% (17th)	6.9% (20th)
11	September 23, 2016	9.1% (14th)	7.5% (16th)	7.7% (17th)	6.8% (20th)
12	September 26, 2016	9.4% (15th)	7.8% (16th)	8.6% (14th)	7.8% (19th)
13	September 27, 2016	9.0% (15th)	6.7% (18th)	8.4% (15th)	7.8% (18th)
14	September 28, 2016	9.5% (14th)	8.0% (15th)	7.5% (17th)	6.8% (20th)
15	September 29, 2016	10.6% (12th)	7.7% (18th)	7.7% (18th)	NR
16	September 30, 2016	11.0% (8th)	8.0% (14th)	8.5% (16th)	7.4% (17th)
17	October 3, 2016	10.0% (13th)	8.3% (14th)	8.4% (18th)	NR
18	October 4, 2016	9.5% (13th)	7.5% (14th)	8.4% (16th)	7.7% (18th)
19	October 5, 2016	9.8% (12th)	7.8% (18th)	8.3% (15th)	7.4% (18th)
20	October 6, 2016	10.1% (13th)	8.3% (14th)	7.6% (17th)	6.7% (20th)
21	October 7, 2016	9.2% (13th)	7.3% (17th)	7.1% (19th)	NR
22	October 10, 2016	8.9% (15th)	7.3% (19th)	8.1% (17th)	7.6% (18th)
23	October 11, 2016	9.4% (13th)	8.0% (17th)	7.4% (17th)	NR
24	October 12, 2016	8.8% (16th)	7.3% (16th)	NR	NR
25	October 13, 2016	8.5% (18th)	NR	7.5% (17th)	NR
26	October 14, 2016	9.4% (15th)	7.4% (16th)	6.8% (17th)	NR
27	October 17, 2016	9.3% (15th)	7.9% (16th)	7.6% (18th)	NR
28	October 18, 2016	8.2% (16th)	NR	7.4% (18th)	NR
29	October 19, 2016	8.8% (16th)	7.2% (18th)	7.3% (20th)	NR
30	October 20, 2016	9.7% (13th)	8.6% (14th)	7.3% (20th)	NR
31	October 21, 2016	10.3% (11th)	8.9% (12th)	7.8% (16th)	6.9% (17th)
32	October 24, 2016	9.6% (15th)	8.4% (13th)	8.4% (14th)	7.5% (19th)
33	October 25, 2016	10.5% (8th)	9.1% (9th)	8.9% (12th)	8.4% (11th)
34	October 26, 2016	10.0% (7th)	8.3% (12th)	7.5% (19th)	6.5% (20th)
35	October 27, 2016	9.9% (13th)	9.3% (9th)	8.0% (15th)	7.3% (18th)
36	October 28, 2016	9.9% (13th)	8.5% (13th)	8.5% (14th)	7.2% (17th)
37	October 31, 2016	10.2% (11th)	8.7% (13th)	8.4% (15th)	7.5% (18th)
38	November 1, 2016	10.1% (9th)	8.7% (9th)	8.0% (14th)	6.8% (18th)
39	November 2, 2016	9.5% (13th)	8.6% (13th)	7.7% (16th)	7.1% (18th)
40	November 3, 2016	10.0% (13th)	9.1% (15th)	8.4% (16th)	NR
41	November 4, 2016	10.3% (7th)	8.3% (11th)	8.7% (8th)	7.6% (13th)
42	November 7, 2016	11.5% (6th)	9.9% (8th)	9.1% (11th)	7.8% (16th)
43	November 8, 2016	10.8% (6th)	9.6% (7th)	9.8% (7th)	8.0% (13th)
44	November 9, 2016	10.7% (9th)	9.2% (9th)	9.4% (11th)	7.8% (16th)
45	November 10, 2016	10.9% (8th)	10.2% (9th)	9.6% (10th)	7.9% (19th)
46	November 11, 2016	12.6% (4th)	10.9% (6th)	10.2% (7th)	7.9% (11th)
47	November 14, 2016	11.4% (7th)	9.7% (6th)	9.1% (12th)	7.6% (18th)
48	November 15, 2016	11.7% (6th)	10.2% (6th)	9.0% (9th)	7.3% (16th)
49	November 16, 2016	11.2% (8th)	9.9% (6th)	8.8% (9th)	7.7% (13th)
50	November 17, 2016	10.5% (9th)	8.8% (9th)	9.1% (10th)	7.8% (14th)
51	November 18, 2016	11.7% (6th)	9.1% (11th)	9.9% (9th)	8.2% (14th)
52	November 21, 2016	11.2% (10th)	8.3% (12th)	9.5% (9th)	8.5% (11th)
53	November 22, 2016	12.9% (6th)	10.3% (7th)	9.2% (10th)	7.7% (13th)
54	November 23, 2016	12.1% (7th)	10.1% (8th)	9.5% (9th)	8.5% (13th)
55	November 24, 2016	11.8% (6th)	9.7% (7th)	10.0% (8th)	8.3% (13th)
56	November 25, 2016	11.5% (7th)	10.1% (8th)	10.5% (7th)	9.5% (8th)
57	November 28, 2016	11.4% (7th)	10.2% (6th)	10.2% (9th)	8.6% (12th)
58	November 29, 2016	11.1% (7th)	9.4% (7th)	9.1% (8th)	7.4% (12th)
59	November 30, 2016	11.1% (8th)	9.9% (7th)	8.7% (10th)	7.3% (13th)
60	December 1, 2016	11.3% (8th)	10.5% (7th)	9.1% (11th)	6.9% (18th)
61	December 2, 2016	10.9% (7th)	8.9% (9th)	9.4% (10th)	8.3% (11th)
62	December 5, 2016	11.7% (6th)	10.7% (6th)	9.6% (8th)	8.5% (10th)
63	December 6, 2016	11.4% (6th)	10.1% (6th)	9.6% (7th)	8.0% (12th)
64	December 7, 2016	12.6% (6th)	10.6% (6th)	9.9% (7th)	8.7% (9th)
65	December 8, 2016	12.3% (6th)	10.5% (7th)	10.4% (8th)	9.0% (8th)
66	December 9, 2016	13.3% (3rd)	11.7% (5th)	9.8% (7th)	8.2% (9th)
67	December 12, 2016	13.0% (6th)	11.8% (6th)	9.6% (10th)	8.6% (12th)
68	December 13, 2016	12.9% (6th)	11.0% (6th)	9.7% (6th)	8.0% (13th)
69	December 14, 2016	12.2% (7th)	10.8% (7th)	9.2% (9th)	8.0% (15th)
70	December 15, 2016	13.7% (6th)	11.9% (7th)	10.5% (6th)	8.6% (11th)
71	December 16, 2016	12.7% (5th)	10.6% (6th)	10.7% (6th)	8.9% (10th)
72	December 19, 2016	13.0% (5th)	11.4% (5th)	10.1% (7th)	8.8% (10th)
73	December 20, 2016	12.1% (7th)	10.7% (5th)	9.9% (5th)	9.4% (5th)
74	December 21, 2016	12.3% (6th)	10.7% (6th)	8.6% (9th)	7.1% (17th)
75	December 22, 2016	13.5% (5th)	12.0% (5th)	10.4% (6th)	9.0% (8th)
76	December 23, 2016	13.2% (5th)	10.7% (7th)	10.4% (7th)	9.2% (9th)
77	December 26, 2016	11.0% (7th)	9.3% (8th)	9.6% (9th)	8.6% (11th)
78	December 27, 2016	11.9% (5th)	10.2% (5th)	10.8% (5th)	9.9% (5th)
79	December 28, 2016	12.1% (5th)	10.6% (6th)	10.0% (7th)	8.5% (12th)
80	December 29, 2016	12.7% (4th)	10.9% (8th)	9.8% (10th)	8.2% (14th)
81	December 30, 2016	12.0% (7th)	9.9% (10th)	10.9% (7th)	9.4% (10th)
82	January 2, 2017	11.9% (6th)	10.4% (6th)	9.8% (9th)	8.6% (13th)
83	January 3, 2017	11.4% (7th)	10.1% (5th)	9.6% (9th)	8.1% (13th)
84	January 4, 2017	11.7% (6th)	10.6% (6th)	9.9% (7th)	7.9% (16th)
85	January 5, 2017	11.4% (7th)	10.1% (7th)	9.3% (10th)	8.1% (16th)
86	January 6, 2017	12.5% (5th)	10.0% (7th)	11.0% (6th)	10.2% (8th)
87	January 9, 2017	10.7% (9th)	9.3% (10th)	10.3% (5th)	9.0% (8th)
88	January 10, 2017	12.4% (5th)	10.7% (5th)	10.1% (6th)	8.5% (11th)
89	January 11, 2017	12.7% (5th)	11.3% (5th)	10.5% (5th)	9.2% (5th)
90	January 12, 2017	12.6% (5th)	10.8% (6th)	10.8% (6th)	9.6% (6th)
91	January 13, 2017	13.3% (5th)	11.2% (6th)	10.2% (7th)	8.9% (10th)
92	January 16, 2017	12.6% (5th)	11.4% (5th)	10.3% (5th)	8.7% (11th)
93	January 17, 2017	12.0% (6th)	10.4% (5th)	9.6% (6th)	8.1% (14th)
94	January 18, 2017	11.7% (6th)	9.3% (6th)	9.5% (7th)	7.8% (15th)
95	January 19, 2017	11.5% (8th)	9.8% (8th)	10.2% (7th)	8.7% (10th)
96	January 20, 2017	12.8% (5th)	10.9% (7th)	11.1% (6th)	9.6% (7th)
97	January 23, 2017	12.2% (4th)	10.6% (5th)	10.3% (6th)	8.8% (7th)
98	January 24, 2017	12.9% (5th)	10.9% (6th)	10.3% (6th)	8.8% (10th)
99	January 25, 2017	12.1% (6th)	9.6% (8th)	10.1% (7th)	8.2% (9th)
100	January 26, 2017	12.7% (5th)	10.0% (7th)	10.0% (7th)	8.0% (13th)
101	January 27, 2017	8.1% (12th)	6.4% (20th)	7.3% (14th)	6.8% (16th)
102	January 30, 2017	12.0% (5th)	9.8% (10th)	9.8% (15th)	NR
103	January 31, 2017	12.9% (5th)	10.3% (5th)	11.3% (6th)	9.8% (7th)
104	February 1, 2017	12.7% (4th)	10.7% (6th)	10.9% (7th)	9.5% (8th)
105	February 2, 2017	13.9% (4th)	11.0% (7th)	11.8% (6th)	10.3% (7th)
106	February 3, 2017	11.8% (7th)	8.9% (11th)	10.4% (8th)	9.2% (8th)
107	February 6, 2017	11.6% (6th)	8.5% (12th)	11.7% (5th)	10.1% (7th)
108	February 7, 2017	12.9% (5th)	10.5% (6th)	11.5% (6th)	9.6% (7th)
109	February 8, 2017	12.1% (5th)	9.1% (10th)	10.8% (5th)	9.1% (10th)
110	February 9, 2017	12.9% (4th)	10.4% (6th)	12.3% (6th)	10.8% (7th)
111	February 10, 2017	12.1% (7th)	8.6% (11th)	11.9% (6th)	10.2% (9th)
112	February 13, 2017	12.3% (5th)	10.4% (6th)	11.8% (5th)	10.0% (9th)
113	February 14, 2017	11.9% (6th)	9.8% (8th)	10.9% (7th)	9.0% (9th)
114	February 15, 2017	11.4% (6th)	10.1% (5th)	11.0% (7th)	8.8% (11th)
115	February 16, 2017	12.0% (6th)	10.4% (7th)	10.4% (8th)	8.8% (9th)
116	February 17, 2017	11.4% (7th)	8.7% (15th)	10.8% (7th)	9.1% (10th)
117	February 20, 2017	10.6% (6th)	9.4% (6th)	10.2% (9th)	8.9% (11th)
118	February 21, 2017	11.0% (6th)	9.3% (7th)	10.4% (9th)	8.4% (11th)
119	February 22, 2017	11.4% (5th)	9.4% (5th)	10.7% (5th)	9.5% (9th)
120	February 23, 2017	11.9% (5th)	9.9% (6th)	10.6% (7th)	8.9% (10th)
121	February 24, 2017	12.9% (4th)	11.0% (6th)	11.1% (7th)	9.4% (9th)
Average		11.1%	%	7.1%	7.6%
