= Secrets of Women (TV series) =

2016 South Korean television series

- Promotional poster
- Also known as: Secrets Inside the Mind
- Genre: Melodrama; Revenge
- Written by: Song Jeong-rim
- Directed by: Lee Kang-hyun
- Starring: So Yi-hyun; Oh Min-suk; Kim Yoon-seo; Kim Jung-heon
- Music by: Lee Chang-hee
- Country of origin: South Korea
- Original language: Korean
- No. of episodes: 104

Production
- Executive producers: Kim Sung Geun; Kim Dong-koo; Lee Jong-seok
- Running time: 35 minutes
- Production companies: DK E&M; Dream T Entertainment

Original release
- Network: KBS2
- Release: 27 June – 25 November 2016

Secrets of Women (Korean: 여자의 비밀) is a 2016 South Korean television series starring So Yi-hyun, Oh Min-suk, Kim Yoon-seo and Kim Jung-heon. It airs on KBS2 on Mondays to Fridays at 19:50, for 100 episodes with the first episode airing on 27 June 2016.

== Plot ==
Kang Ji-yoo is a ballerina, the girlfriend of Yoo Kang Yu, heir of Moseong Group. After a traffic accident, Kang Ji-yoo lost all of her memories, her family using up all their money to pay five years' worth of hospital treatments. To pay for her huge debt, she entered the Yoo family (with no idea about Kang-Yu's identity or their past due to her amnesia) to be the nurse & guardian of Moseong Group's chairman Yoo Man-ho (Kang-Yu's father). Chae Seo-rin was Ji-yoo's best friend during high school, but was then raped on the orders of Byeon Il-goo. She was then forced to work with him to become the biggest stockholder of Moseong Group, becoming Ji-yoo's enemy in the process.

== Cast ==
=== Main cast ===
- So Yi-hyun as Kang Ji-yoo

A talented ballerina and Kang-woo's girlfriend. Due to a traffic accident (in which her father died as well), she was in a coma for five years and lost all of her memories. She was found by Seo-rin after the accident and kept her in a nursing home (posing as "Hong Sun-bok"), forcing her mother to care for Ji-yoo thinking she has no hope of ever regaining consciousness. Unbeknownst to Ji-yoo, she and Kang-woo had a child, which was taken away by Seo-rin (during her five-year coma) as part of her plan of revenge, claiming it as her child with Kang-woo. Since regaining consciousness, along with trying to recover her memories and fighting the feeling of maybe having given birth to a child, she has been working as a nurse in the Yoo family to try to find out the real cause of the accident (as well as justice for her father's unjust death), her only memory a man with a wing tattoo. She has no idea or realization on how close she is with Kang-woo (and their past relationship) as well as their son.

- Oh Min-suk as Yoo Kang-woo

Heir to Moseong Group, Yoo Man-ho's second wife's son, and Ji-yoo's boyfriend before the accident. After Ji-yoo "supposedly" died in the accident, he became insane. Seo-rin tricked the distraught Kang-woo into marrying her, making him believe he had cheated on Ji-yoo with Seo-rin, as well as claiming she is pregnant with "their" child.
After encountering Ji-yoo again after 5 years, he tries very hard to help Ji-yoo recover her memories so that he can finally marry Ji-yoo and live the happy life that was stolen from him.

- Kim Yoon-seo as Chae Seo-rin/Hong Sun-bok

Despite being poor, she was Ji-yoo's best friend during high school. One night she was raped as she was on her way doing an errand for Ji-yoo (which was a pretext for Seo-rin to celebrate her 18th birthday which was organized as a surprise by Ji-yoo). After Ji-yoo's accident, Sun-bok changed her name to "Chae Seo-rin" (after a gangster saved her) because she wanted to get out of the "nightmare" that was her poverty. Byeon Il-goo then forced her to help him to become the biggest stockholder of Moseong Group. Seo-rin marries Kang-woo because of a child she claims to be theirs, but the child is actually Kang-woo and Ji-yoo's son which Seo-rin stole away from the then-unconscious Ji-yoo.

- Kim Jung-heon as Min Seon-ho

A university student, the legitimate child of Yoo Man-ho from his first wife. Has been harboring an unrequited love for Ji-yoo for seven years. After finding Ji-yoo alive and conscious, he becomes her friend whom she leans on to help her recover her memories especially about the accident. He resents his father for abandoning them, especially his mother (played by Lee Sang-suk) who had died of cancer.

=== Kang Family and household ===
- Sora Jung as Song Hyun-sook - Ji-yoo's mother
- Park Chul-ho as Kang Kyung-ik

Ji-yoo's father. Died at the traffic accident which Ji-yoo suffered

- Kwon Hwa-woon as Kang Ji-chan

Ji-yoo's brother. Works at a coffee shop. Seon-ho's friend.

- Choi Ran as Park Bok-ja

Seo-rin's mother who previously worked as the Kang family's household help. 4 years after Seo-rin's disappearance and new identity, she sent her to the U.S., but returned to South Korea after 2 years. Currently living in secret with the Kang family to avoid her daughter whom she fears.

=== Yoo Family and household ===
- Song Ki-yoon as Yoo Man-ho

Kang-woo's father, chairman of Moseong Group. Hates Seo-rin very much but likes and dotes on Ji-yoo.

- Moon Hee-kyung as Yoo Jang-mi

Kang-woo's sister. Hates Ji-yoo very much, always thinks of schemes to remove her from the Yoo family.

- Lee Young-bum as Byeon Il-goo

Jang-mi's husband. One of the executives as well as stockholder of Moseong Group. Wants to control Moseong Group.

- Ha Seung-ri as Byeon Mi-rae

Byeon Il-goo & Yoo Jang-mi's daughter. Wants to be a singer but is not talented.

- Son Jang-woo as Yoo Ma-eum

Ji-yoo and Kang-woo's son. He was born in secret while Ji-yoo was unconscious. Seo-rin took him away from his birth mother and deceived the Yoo family, claiming Ma-eum is her son with Kang-woo.

- Jung Jae-soon as Mi-hee - Kang-woo & Jang-mi's mother
- Lee Ju-hwa as Wonju-daek - Yoo family's household help

=== Other characters ===
- Kim Hyun as Caretaker
- Jo Yeon-hee as Nurse Kim
- Lee Sun-goo as Oh Dong-soo

A gangster who works under Byeon Il-goo. Secretly in love with Seo-rin, he becomes her driver & secretary, as well as aiding in her revenge plan.

== Ratings ==
In the table below, the blue numbers represent the lowest ratings and the red numbers represent the highest ratings. "—" denotes that it did not rank in the Top 20 daily programs.

Episode #	Date	Average audience share			
Episode #	Date	TNmS Ratings		AGB Nielsen	
Episode #	Date	Nationwide	Seoul National Capital Area	Nationwide	Seoul National Capital Area
1	2016/06/27	15.5%	14.6%	14.1%	13.4%
2	2016/06/28	13.2%	11.4%	12.5%	11.4%
3	2016/06/29	13.1%	11.6%	12.5%	12.9%
4	2016/06/30	13.9%	12.3%	13.3%	13.8%
5	2016/07/01	16.3%	15.0%	15.2%	15.3%
6	2016/07/04	15.1%	14.1%	15.5%	15.3%
7	2016/07/05	16.1%	15.5%	15.3%	15.6%
8	2016/07/06	14.8%	12.0%	15.2%	14.5%
9	2016/07/07	15.8%	13.6%	14.7%	14.7%
10	2016/07/08	15.0%	14.0%	14.3%	14.4%
11	2016/07/11	17.7%	14.5%	16.7%	16.6%
12	2016/07/12	16.1%	13.7%	15.0%	14.9%
13	2016/07/13	16.0%	13.8%	15.5%	15.8%
14	2016/07/14	15.2%	14.2%	14.7%	14.5%
15	2016/07/15	16.7%	14.5%	16.2%	16.5%
16	2016/07/18	16.2%	14.3%	15.1%	14.9%
17	2016/07/19	17.8%	14.7%	15.8%	15.6%
18	2016/07/20	17.3%	14.9%	15.4%	15.3%
19	2016/07/21	17.4%	15.6%	16.0%	16.2%
20	2016/07/22	17.6%	16.4%	15.2%	15.7%
21	2016/07/25	15.2%	11.9%	15.6%	16.0%
22	2016/07/26	17.9%	15.3%	15.1%	15.2%
23	2016/07/27	16.8%	14.9%	15.7%	15.6%
24	2016/07/28	17.8%	16.0%	15.7%	16.1%
25	2016/07/29	16.1%	14.1%	15.6%	15.5%
26	2016/08/01	18.2%	16.3%	15.4%	15.0%
27	2016/08/02	19.7%	16.8%	17.3%	17.7%
28	2016/08/04	16.7%	14.9%	14.8%	15.0%
29	2016/08/05	18.2%	17.1%	16.6%	16.4%
30	2016/08/08	16.9%	15.7%	15.7%	15.1%
31	2016/08/09	18.1%	16.7%	14.9%	13.9%
32	2016/08/10	16.7%	15.2%	15.1%	14.1%
33	2016/08/12	16.5%	14.7%	15.5%	14.9%
34	2016/08/15	15.9%	13.9%	14.2%	14.0%
35	2016/08/16	14.1%	12.3%	11.8%	11.9%
36	2016/08/17	19.2%	16.6%	15.8%	15.5%
37	2016/08/18	15.8%	13.2%	13.6%	13.7%
38	2016/08/19	17.9%	15.7%	16.6%	16.4%
39	2016/08/22	18.4%	15.7%	16.4%	15.6%
40	2016/08/23	19.5%	17.1%	15.0%	16.7%
41	2016/08/24	17.7%	14.6%	15.8%	15.2%
42	2016/08/25	19.7%	18.3%	16.6%	16.8%
43	2016/08/26	18.7%	15.8%	17.6%	16.6%
44	2016/08/29	19.0%	16.4%	17.5%	17.8%
45	2016/08/30	19.7%	16.2%	18.3%	16.9%
46	2016/08/31	21.4%	18.4%	18.1%	18.0%
47	2016/09/01	20.2%	17.6%	18.1%	17.6%
48	2016/09/02	21.5%	18.1%	18.9%	17.6%
49	2016/09/05	20.8%	17.8%	18.5%	17.4%
50	2016/09/06	20.8%	18.2%	18.6%	17.5%
51	2016/09/07	20.8%	18.6%	18.0%	16.9%
52	2016/09/08	18.7%	16.4%	18.2%	17.4%
53	2016/09/09	20.2%	16.7%	18.3%	16.7%
54	2016/09/12	19.4%	16.6%	17.9%	17.5%
55	2016/09/13	19.0%	16.3%	18.6%	18.4%
56	2016/09/14	14.1%	13.0%	12.3%	11.5%
57	2016/09/15	6.4%		6.1%	
58	2016/09/15	15.9%	14.0%	14.5%	13.9%
59	2016/09/19	21.5%	18.3%	19.1%	18.5%
60	2016/09/20	22.8%	19.4%	19.6%	18.5%
61	2016/09/21	20.8%	18.5%	18.6%	17.2%
62	2016/09/22	22.0%	19.2%	19.5%	19.1%
63	2016/09/26	22.3%	19.1%	20.1%	19.5%
64	2016/09/27	24.3%	21.0%	21.0%	20.3%
65	2016/09/28	23.7%	20.4%	19.7%	18.6%
66	2016/09/29	23.9%	20.7%	21.1%	19.6%
67	2016/09/30	22.1%	18.9%	19.5%	18.5%
68	2016/10/03	23.5%	20.0%	22.3%	21.0%
69	2016/10/04	25.1%	22.0%	22.7%	21.2%
70	2016/10/05	22.6%	18.8%	21.0%	19.2%
71	2016/10/06	22.4%	19.4%	19.4%	18.5%
72	2016/10/07	23.9%	20.5%	21.3%	19.9%
73	2016/10/10	22.2%	18.8%	18.6%	17.7%
74	2016/10/11	23.1%	20.0%	19.4%	18.4%
75	2016/10/12	22.5%	21.3%	19.0%	17.3%
76	2016/10/14	19.2%	16.6%	17.1%	16.9%
77	2016/10/17	21.1%	19.1%	18.2%	17.3%
78	2016/10/18	22.2%	18.8%	19.8%	18.8%
79	2016/10/19	21.5%	17.7%	18.2%	17.3%
80	2016/10/20	21.0%	19.2%	18.1%	17.1%
81	2016/10/21	20.6%	18.8%	17.1%	15.8%
82	2016/10/24	22.4%	20.4%	19.6%	19.0%
83	2016/10/25	21.5%	18.3%	18.0%	17.1%
84	2016/10/26	21.9%	19.7%	19.3%	17.8%
85	2016/10/27	21.5%	18.5%	18.8%	17.3%
86	2016/10/28	22.1%	19.3%	18.6%	17.7%
87	2016/10/31	22.2%	19.1%	19.6%	18.7%
88	2016/11/01	21.8%	18.6%	18.7%	17.6%
89	2016/11/03	22.3%	19.2%	18.4%	17.4%
90	2016/11/04	20.3%	17.7%	17.6%	16.2%
91	2016/11/07	22.3%	18.6%	19.9%	19.6%
92	2016/11/08	23.3%	20.1%	21.4%	20.8%
93	2016/11/09	22.3%	19.4%	20.0%	18.6%
94	2016/11/10	22.1%	19.4%	19.4%	18.1%
95	2016/11/14	22.3%	19.1%	19.1%	18.0%
96	2016/11/15	22.8%	19.6%	19.7%	18.3%
97	2016/11/16	22.5%	20.1%	18.7%	17.4%
98	2016/11/17	23.3%	20.1%	19.8%	18.9%
99	2016/11/18	22.8%	20.1%	18.9%	18.0%
100	2016/11/21	22.5%	19.6%	18.1%	17.0%
101	2016/11/22	24.2%	22.1%	20.3%	19.5%
102	2016/11/23	21.9%	19.2%	20.4%	19.3%
103	2016/11/24	24.1%	21.6%	20.1%	19.3%
104	2016/11/25	22.9%	20.0%	20.4%	19.7%
Average		19.48%	17.13%	17.32%	16.82%

== Awards and nominations ==
Year	Award	Category	Recipient	Result
2016	5th APAN Star Awards	Excellence Award, Actress in a Serial Drama	So Yi-hyun	Nominated
2016	30th KBS Drama Awards	Excellence Award, Actor in a Daily Drama	Oh Min-suk	Won
2016	30th KBS Drama Awards	Excellence Award, Actress in a Daily Drama	So Yi-hyun	Won
