= Kang Suk-jung =

South Korean actor

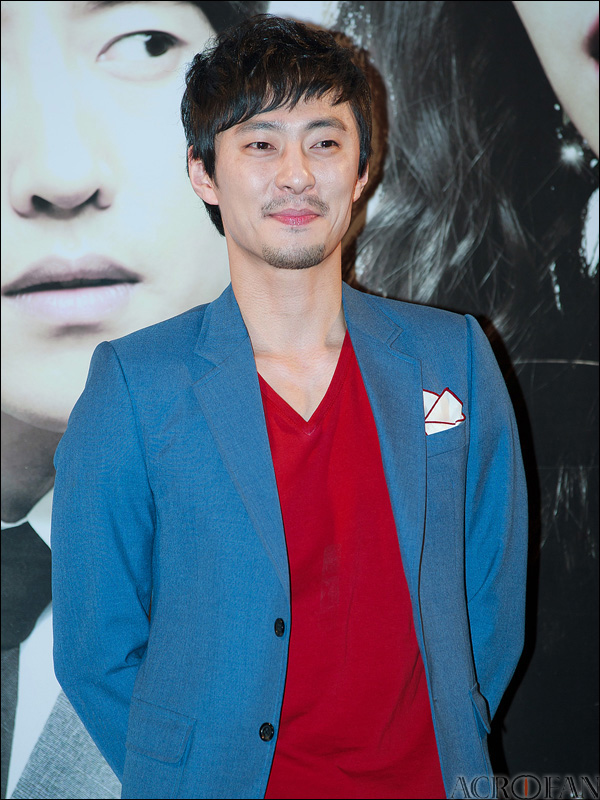
- Kang in 2012
- Born: June 18, 1979 (age 47); South Korea
- Education: Cheongju University - Performing Arts and Multimedia
- Occupation: Actor
- Years active: 2007–present
- Agent: Happy Actors

Korean name
- Hangul: 강석정
- Hanja: 姜石定
- RR: Gang Seokjeong
- MR: Kang Sŏkchŏng

Kang Suk-jung (born June 18, 1979) is a South Korean actor.

== Television series ==
Year	Title	Role	Network
2007	By My Side	Produce vendor	MBC
2007	Seo-young's Spy	Kim Ji-wook	Super Action
2008	Woman of Matchless Beauty, Park Jung-geum	Detective Kim	MBC
2008	Don't Be Swayed		MBC
2009	White Lie	Cha Min-jae	MBC
2012	Ice Adonis	Kim Tae-il	tvN
2013	Your Lady	Hwang Jae-yeol	SBS
2013	Fantasy Tower	Bartender	tvN
2014	Cheo Yong	Im Dong-chul (ep.7)	OCN
