= List of Korean dramas =

This is an incomplete list of Korean dramas, broadcast on nationwide networks KBS (KBS1 and KBS2), MBC, SBS; and cable channels JTBC, tvN, OCN, Channel A, MBN, Mnet and TV Chosun. The list also contains notable miniseries and web series broadcast on Naver TV, TVING, Wavve, Coupang Play, Netflix, Viu, Viki, iQIYI, Disney+ (Star), Apple TV+, Amazon Prime Video, Paramount+, and other online streaming platforms.

== 0–9 ==
- 100 Days My Prince (2018)
- 100 Days of Deception (2026)
- 12 Signs of Love (2012)
- 12 Years Promise (2014)
- 18 Again (2020)
- 1st Republic (1981–1982)
- 365: Repeat the Year (2020)
- 4 Legendary Witches (2014–2015)
- 49 Days (2011)
- 5th Republic (2005)
- 7 First Kisses (2016–2017)
- 7th Grade Civil Servant (2013)
- 90 Days, Time to Love (2006–2007)

== A ==
- A Beautiful Mind (2016)
- A Bird That Doesn't Sing (2015–2016)
- A Bloody Lucky Day (2023)
- A Bona Fide Killer (2026)
- A Breeze of Love (2023)
- A Daughter Just Like You (2015)
- A Gentleman's Dignity (2012)
- A Girl Who Sees Smells (2015)
- A Good Day to Be a Dog (2023–2024)
- A Graceful Liar (2025–2026)
- A Happy Woman (2007)
- A Head Coach's Turnover (2025)
- A Hundred Memories (2025)
- A Hundred Year Legacy (2013)
- A Killer Paradox (2024)
- A Korean Odyssey (2017–2018)
- A Little Love Never Hurts (2013–2014)
- A Love So Beautiful (2020–2021)
- A Love to Kill (2005)
- A Man Called God (2010)
- A Model Family (2022)
- A New Leaf (2014)
- A Piece of Your Mind (2020)
- A Place in the Sun (2018–2019)
- A Pledge to God (2018–2019)
- A Poem a Day (2018)
- A Shop for Killers (2024–present)
- A Shoulder to Cry On (2023)
- A Superior Day (2022)
- A Tale of Two Sisters (2013)
- A Thousand Days' Promise (2011)
- A Thousand Kisses (2011–2012)
- A Time Called You (2023)
- A Virtuous Business (2024)
- A Witch's Love (2014)
- A-Teen (2018)
- A-Teen 2 (2019)
- About Time (2018)
- Absolute Value of Romance (2026)
- Abyss (2019)
- Ad Genius Lee Tae-baek (2013)
- Adamas (2022)
- Adult Trainee (2021)
- Aeja's Older Sister, Minja (2008–2009)
- Aema (2025)
- Aftermath (2014)
- Again My Life (2022)
- Age of Innocence (2002)
- Age of Warriors (2002–2003)
- Agency (2023)
- Agent Kim Reactivated (2026)
- Air City (2007)
- Alchemy of Souls (2022–2023)
- Alice (2020)
- All About Eve (2000)
- All About My Mom (2015–2016)
- All About My Romance (2013)
- All In (2003)
- All My Love for You (2010–2011)
- All of Us Are Dead (2022–present)
- All That We Loved (2023)
- Alone in Love (2006)
- Always Meet Again (2026)
- Amanza (2020)
- Amor Fati (2021–2022)
- Andante (2017–2018)
- Ang Shim Jung (2010–2011)
- Angel Eyes (2014)
- Angel's Choice (2012)
- Angel's Last Mission: Love (2019)
- Angel's Revenge (2014)
- Angry Mom (2015)
- Anna (2022)
- Anniversary Anyway (2019)
- Another Miss Oh (2016)
- Another Peaceful Day of Second-Hand Items (2021)
- Apgujeong Midnight Sun (2014–2015)
- April Kiss (2004)
- Arang and the Magistrate (2012)
- Are You Human? (2018)
- Argon (2017)
- Arthdal Chronicles (2019–2023)
- Artificial City (2021–2022)
- As You Stood By (2025)
- Asphalt Man (1995)
- Assembly (2015)
- Assorted Gems (2009–2010)
- At Eighteen (2019)
- At a Distance, Spring Is Green (2021)
- Athena: Goddess of War (2010–2011)
- Autumn Shower (2005)
- Avengers Social Club (2017)
- Awaken (2020–2021)

== B ==
- Babel (2019)
- Baby Faced Beauty (2011)
- Babysitter (2016)
- Bachelor's Vegetable Store (2011–2012)
- Backstreet Rookie (2020)
- Bad and Crazy (2021–2022)
- Bad Family (2006)
- Bad Guy (2010)
- Bad Guys (2014)
- Bad Guys 2 (2017–2018)
- Bad Housewife (2005)
- Bad Memory Eraser (2024)
- Bad Papa (2018)
- Bad Prosecutor (2022)
- Bad Thief, Good Thief (2017)
- Bad Woman, Good Woman (2006)
- Ball Boy Tactics (2025)
- Ballad of Seodong (2005–2006)
- Band of Sisters (2017)
- Banjun Drama (2004–2006)
- Bargain (2022)
- Basketball (2013)
- Battle for Happiness (2023)
- Be Melodramatic (2019)
- Be My Dream Family (2021)
- Be Positive (2016)
- Be Strong, Geum-soon! (2005)
- Beasts of Asia (2021–2022)
- Beating Again (2015)
- Beating Heart (2005)
- Beautiful Days (2001)
- Beautiful Gong Shim (2016)
- Beautiful Love, Wonderful Life (2019–2020)
- Beautiful World (2019)
- Beauty and Mr. Romantic (2024)
- Because This Is My First Life (2017)
- Becky's Back (2016)
- Becoming a Billionaire (2010)
- Becoming Witch (2022)
- Beethoven Virus (2008)
- Begins ≠ Youth (2024)
- Behind Every Star (2022)
- Behind the White Tower (2007)
- Behind Your Touch (2023)
- Bel Ami (2013–2014)
- Best Chicken (2019)
- Between Him and Her (2023–2024)
- Between Steps (2026)
- Beyond Evil (2021)
- Beyond the Bar (2025)
- Beyond the Clouds (2014)
- Big (2012)
- Big Bet (2022–2023)
- Big Issue (2019)
- Big Man (2014)
- Big Mouth (2022)
- Big Thing (2010)
- Billie Jean, Look at Me (2006–2007)
- Birdie Buddy (2011)
- Birth of a Beauty (2014–2015)
- Birthcare Center (2020)
- Birthday Letter (2019)
- Bitch x Rich (2023–2025)
- Bitter Sweet Hell (2024)
- Bitter Sweet Life (2008)
- Bizarre Bunch (2005–2006)
- Black (2017)
- Black Dog: Being A Teacher (2019–2020)
- Black Knight (2023)
- Black Knight: The Man Who Guards Me (2017–2018)
- Black Out (2024)
- Blade Man (2014)
- Blessing of the Sea (2019)
- Blind (2022)
- Blood (2015)
- Blood Free (2024)
- Blooded Palace: The War of Flowers (2013)
- Bloodhounds (2023–present)
- Bloody Flower (2026)
- Bloody Heart (2022)
- Blossom Sisters (2010)
- Blow Breeze (2016–2017)
- Blue Birthday (2021)
- Bodyguard (2003)
- Bon Appétit, Your Majesty (2025)
- Born Again (2020)
- Bossam: Steal the Fate (2021)
- Boyfriend on Demand (2026)
- Boyhood (2023–2026)
- Boys Over Flowers (2009)
- Brain (2011–2012)
- Brain Works (2023)
- Branding in Seongsu (2024)
- Bravo My Life (2017–2018)
- Bravo, My Life (2022)
- Bravo, My Love! (2011–2012)
- Bread, Love and Dreams (2010)
- Brewing Love (2024)
- Bridal Mask (2012)
- Bride of the Century (2014)
- Bride of the Sun (2011–2012)
- Brilliant Heritage (2020)
- Brilliant Legacy (2009)
- Bring It On, Ghost (2016)
- Bubble Gum (2015)
- Bubbly Lovely (2016–2017)
- Bulgasal: Immortal Souls (2021–2022)
- Buried Hearts (2025)
- Business Proposal (2022)

== C ==
- Cabbage Your Life (2026)
- Café Minamdang (2022)
- Cain and Abel (2009)
- Call It Love (2023)
- Can This Love Be Translated? (2025)
- Can We Fall in Love, Again? (2014)
- Can We Get Married? (2012–2013)
- Can't Lose (2011)
- Can't Stand Anymore (2013–2014)
- Capital Scandal (2007)
- Captivating the King (2024)
- Cashero (2025)
- Castaway Diva (2023)
- Catch the Ghost (2019)
- Cats on the Roof (2003)
- Celebrity (2023)
- CEO-dol Mart (2023)
- Cheat on Me If You Can (2020–2021)
- Check-in Hanyang (2024–2025)
- Cheer Up (2022)
- Cheer Up! (2015)
- Cheer Up, Mr. Kim! (2012–2013)
- Cheese in the Trap (2016)
- Cheongdam-dong Alice (2012–2013)
- Cheongdam-dong Scandal (2014–2015)
- Cheo Yong (2014–2015)
- Chicago Typewriter (2017)
- Chicken Nugget (2024)
- Chief Detective 1958 (2024)
- Chief of Staff (2019)
- Children of a Lesser God (2018)
- Children of Nobody (2018–2019)
- Children of the 20th Century (2017)
- Chimera (2021)
- Chip In (2020)
- Choco Bank (2016)
- Chocolate (2019–2020)
- Chunja's Special Day (2008)
- Cinderella at 2 AM (2024)
- Cinderella Game (2024–2025)
- Cinderella Man (2009)
- Cinderella with Four Knights (2016)
- Cinderella's Stepsister (2010)
- Circle (2017)
- City Conquest (cancelled)
- City Hunter (2011)
- City of the Sun (2015)
- Class of Lies (2019)
- Clean with Passion for Now (2018–2019)
- Cleaning Up (2022)
- Climax (2026)
- Cloud Stairs (2006)
- Coffee House (2010)
- Coffee Prince (2007)
- Coffee, Do Me a Favor (2018)
- Color Rush (2020–2022)
- Coma (2006)
- Come and Hug Me (2018)
- Come Back Mister (2016)
- Concrete Market (2025)
- Confession (2019)
- Confidence Queen (2025)
- Connect (2022)
- Connection (2024)
- Conspiracy in the Court (2007)
- Couple or Trouble (2006)
- Crash (2024–2026)
- Crash Course in Romance (2023)
- Crash Landing on You (2019–2020)
- Crazy Love (2013)
- Crazy Love (2022)
- Creating Destiny (2009–2010)
- Criminal Minds (2017)
- Cross (2018)
- Cruel Love (2007–2008)
- Crushology 101 (2025)
- Cunning Single Lady (2014)
- Curtain Call (2022)

== D ==
- D-Day (2015)
- D.P. (2021–2023)
- Dae Jang Geum Is Watching (2018–2019)
- Dae Jo-yeong (2006–2007)
- Daemyeong (1981)
- Daily Dose of Sunshine (2023)
- Dal-ja's Spring (2007)
- Dali & Cocky Prince (2021)
- Damo (2003)
- Dangerous Woman (2011–2012)
- Dare to Love Me (2024)
- Daring Women (2010)
- Dark Hole (2021)
- Dating Agency: Cyrano (2013)
- Daughters-in-Law (2007–2008)
- Dead-End Job (2026)
- Dear Archimedes (TBA)
- Dear Heaven (2005–2006)
- Dear Hongrang (2025)
- Dear Hyeri (2024)
- Dear My Friends (2016)
- Dear X (2025)
- Dear X Who Doesn't Love Me (2022)
- Dear.M (2022)
- Death's Game (2023–2024)
- Deep Rooted Tree (2011)
- Definitely Neighbors (2010)
- Delayed Justice (2020–2021)
- Delicious Proposal (2001)
- Delightfully Deceitful (2023)
- Delivery (2021)
- Delivery Man (2023)
- Descendants of the Sun (2016)
- Designated Survivor: 60 Days (2019)
- Desperate Mrs. Seonju (2024–2025)
- Destined with You (2023)
- Detectives in Trouble (2011)
- Devilish Charm (2018)
- Diary of a Night Watchman (2014)
- Diary of a Prosecutor (2019–2020)
- Did We Really Love? (1999)
- Different Dreams (2019)
- Dinner Mate (2020)
- Discovery of Love (2014)
- Distorted (2017)
- Dive into You (2026)
- Divorce Attorney Shin (2023)
- Divorce Lawyer in Love (2015)
- DNA Lover (2024)
- Do Do Sol Sol La La Sol (2020)
- Do You Like Brahms? (2020)
- Doctor Cha (2023)
- Doctor Detective (2019)
- Doctor Doctor (2000)
- Doctor John (2019)
- Doctor Lawyer (2022)
- Doctor on the Edge (2026)
- Doctor Prisoner (2019)
- Doctor Shin (2026)
- Doctor Slump (2024)
- Doctor Stranger (2014)
- Doctor X: Mafia in White (2026)
- Dog Knows Everything (2024)
- Dokgo Rewind (2018)
- Dong Yi (2010)
- Dongjae, the Good or the Bastard (2024)
- Don't Call Me Ma'am (2025)
- Don't Cry My Love (2008–2009)
- Don't Dare to Dream (2016)
- Don't Hesitate (2009–2010)
- Don't Look Back: The Legend of Orpheus (2013)
- Doom at Your Service (2021)
- Doona! (2023)
- Doubt (2024)
- Drama City (1984–2008)
- Drama Special Series (2010–2013)
  - Just an Ordinary Love Story (2012)
  - Puberty Medley (2013)
  - Rock, Rock, Rock (2010)
  - White Christmas (2011)
- Drama Stage (2017–present)
  - Don't Announce Your Husband's Death (2022)
  - Find the 1st Prize (2022)
  - The Apartment Is Beautiful (2022)
- Dream (2009)
- Dream High (2011)
- Dream High 2 (2012)
- Dream of the Emperor (2012–2013)
- Dream to You (2026)
- Dreaming of a Freaking Fairy Tale (2024)
- Drinking Solo (2016)
- Dr. Brain (2021)
- Dr. Champ (2010)
- Dr. Frost (2014–2015)
- Dr. Ian (2015)
- Dr. Jin (2012)
- Dr. Kkang (2006)
- Dr. Park's Clinic (2022)
- Dr. Romantic (2016–2023)
- Duel (2017)
- Dummy Mommy (2012)
- Durian's Affair (2023)
- Duty After School (2023)
- Dynamite Kiss (2025)

== E ==
- East of Eden (2008–2009)
- Eccentric! Chef Moon (2020)
- Eight Days, Assassination Attempts against King Jeongjo (2007)
- Eighteen, Twenty-Nine (2005)
- Emergency Couple (2014)
- Emperor of the Sea (2004–2005)
- Empire of Gold (2013)
- Empress Cheonchu (2009)
- Empress Ki (2013–2014)
- Empress Myeongseong (2001–2002)
- Enchanting Neighbor (2015)
- Encounter (2018–2019)
- Endless Love (2014)
- Endless Love Series (2000–2006)
  - Autumn in My Heart (2000)
  - Spring Waltz (2006)
  - Summer Scent (2003)
  - Winter Sonata (2002)
- Enemies from the Past (2017–2018)
- Entertainer (2016)
- Entourage (2016)
- Erexion (2006)
- Eve (2022)
- Evergreen (2018)
- Everybody Say Kimchi (2014)
- Evilive (2023)
- Exit (2018)
- Exo Next Door (2015)
- Extracurricular (2020)
- Extraordinary Attorney Woo (2022)
- Extraordinary You (2019)
- Ex-Girlfriends' Club (2015)
- Eyes of Dawn (1991–1992)

== F ==
- Face Me (2024)
- Faith (2012)
- Falling for Challenge (2015)
- Familiar Wife (2018)
- Family (2012–2013)
- Family by Choice (2024)
- Family Matters (2024–2026)
- Family Register (2026)
- Family Secret (2014–2015)
- Family's Honor (2008–2009)
- Family: The Unbreakable Bond (2023)
- Fanletter, Please! (2022)
- Fantastic (2016)
- Fashion 70s (2005)
- Fashion King (2012)
- Fatal Promise (2020)
- Fates & Furies (2018–2019)
- Father, I'll Take Care of You (2016–2017)
- Father's House (2009)
- Feast of the Gods (2012)
- Feel Good to Die (2018)
- Fifties Professionals (2026)
- Fight for My Way (2017)
- Filing for Love (2026)
- Final Table (2026)
- Find Me in Your Memory (2020)
- Fireworks (2000)
- Fireworks (2006)
- First Lady (2025)
- First Love (1996–1997)
- First Love (2025)
- First Love Again (2016–2017)
- First Love of a Royal Prince (2004)
- First Wives' Club (2007–2008)
- Five Enough (2016)
- Five Fingers (2012)
- Flames of Desire (2010–2011)
- Flex X Cop (2024–present)
- Flower Boy Ramen Shop (2011)
- Flower Boys Next Door (2013)
- Flower Crew: Joseon Marriage Agency (2019)
- Flower Grandpa Investigation Unit (2014)
- Flower of Evil (2020)
- Flower of Queen (2015)
- Flower of Revenge (2013)
- Flowers of the Prison (2016)
- Fly High Butterfly (2022)
- For Eagle Brothers (2025)
- Forbidden Love (2004)
- Forecasting Love and Weather (2022)
- Forest (2020)
- Forever Young (2015)
- Foundation of the Kingdom (1983)
- Four Hands, Two Sonatas (2026)
- Four Sisters (2001)
- Fragile (2024)
- Francesca Next Door (2026)
- Frankly Speaking (2024)
- Freedom Fighter, Lee Hoe-young (2010)
- Freeze (2006)
- Friend, Our Legend (2009)
- Friendly Rivalry (2025)
- Friends (2002)
- From Now On, Showtime! (2022)
- Full House (2004)
- Full House Take 2 (2012)

== G ==
- Gangnam B-Side (2024)
- Gangnam Beauty (2018)
- Gangnam Scandal (2018–2019)
- Gap-dong (2014)
- Gaus Electronics (2022)
- Genie, Make a Wish (2025)
- Get Karl! Oh Soo-jung (2007)
- Get Revenge (2020–2021)
- Get Up (2008)
- Ghost Doctor (2022)
- Giant (2010)
- Girls' Generation 1979 (2017)
- Glamorous Temptation (2015–2016)
- Glass Castle (2008–2009)
- Glass Mask (2012–2013)
- Glass Slippers (2002)
- Glitch (2022)
- Gloria (2010–2011)
- Glorious Day (2014)
- Glory Jane (2011)
- Go Back (2017)
- God of War (2012)
- Goddess of Fire (2013)
- Goddess of Marriage (2013)
- God's Gift: 14 Days (2014)
- Gogh, The Starry Night (2016)
- Gold Land (2026)
- Gold Mask (2022)
- Golden Apple (2005–2006)
- Golden Bride (2007–2008)
- Golden Cross (2014)
- Golden Fish (2010)
- Golden House (2010)
- Golden Pouch (2016–2017)
- Golden Rainbow (2013–2014)
- Golden Time (2012)
- Good Boy (2025)
- Good Casting (2020)
- Good Doctor (2013)
- Good Job (2022)
- Good Job, Good Job (2009)
- Good Luck! (2025)
- Good Manager (2017)
- Good Partner (2024–2026)
- Goodbye Dear Wife (2012)
- Goodbye Earth (2024)
- Goodbye Mr. Black (2016)
- Goodbye My Love (1999)
- Goodbye Solo (2006)
- Goodbye to Goodbye (2018)
- Gourmet (2008)
- Graceful Family (2019)
- Graceful Friends (2020)
- Gracious Revenge (2019–2020)
- Grand Prince (2018)
- Great Inheritance (2006)
- Green Mothers' Club (2022)
- Green Rose (2005)
- Grid (2022)
- Grudge: The Revolt of Gumiho (2010)
- Gu Family Book (2013)
- Guardian Angel (2001)
- Guardian: The Lonely and Great God (2016–2017)
- Gunman in Joseon (2014)
- Gwanggaeto, The Great Conqueror (2011–2012)
- Gyebaek (2011)
- Gyeongseong Creature (2023–2024)

== H ==
- H.I.T (2007)
- Haechi (2019)
- Han River Police (2023)
- Happiness (2021)
- Happiness in the Wind (2010)
- Happy Anding (2026)
- Happy Ending (2012)
- Happy Home (2016)
- Happy Sisters (2017–2018)
- Happy Together (1999)
- He Is Psychometric (2019)
- He Who Can't Marry (2009)
- Heading to the Ground (2009)
- Head over Heels (2025)
- Healer (2014–2015)
- Heard It Through the Grapevine (2015)
- Heart Surgeons (2018)
- Heart to Heart (2015)
- Heartbeat (2023)
- Heartless City (2013)
- Hearts and Hari (2020)
- Hearts of Nineteen (2006–2007)
- Heartstrings (2011)
- Heaven & Earth (2007)
- Heavenly Ever After (2025)
- Heesu in Class 2 (2025)
- Hellbound (2021–2024)
- Hello Franceska (2005–2006)
- Hello Monster (2015)
- Hello My Teacher (2005)
- Hello, Me! (2021)
- Hello! Miss (2007)
- Hello, My Twenties! (2016–2017)
- Heo's Diner (2025)
- Her Private Life (2019)
- Here Comes Mr. Oh (2012–2013)
- Here's My Plan (2021)
- Hero (2009–2010)
- Heroes Next Door (2025)
- Hi Bye, Mama! (2020)
- Hi! School: Love On (2014)
- Hidden Identity (2015)
- Hide (2024)
- Hide and Seek (2018)
- Hierarchy (2024)
- High Class (2021)
- High Cookie (2023)
- High End Crush (2015–2016)
- High Kick Through the Roof (2009–2010)
- High Kick! (2006–2007)
- High Kick: Revenge of the Short Legged (2011–2012)
- High School King of Savvy (2014)
- High School Return of a Gangster (2024)
- High Society (2015)
- Hilarious Housewives (2009)
- History of a Salaryman (2012)
- History of Scruffiness (2025)
- Hit the Top (2017)
- Hogu's Love (2015)
- Hold Me Tight (2018)
- Hold My Hand (2013–2014)
- Home for Summer (2019)
- Home Sweet Home (2010)
- Homemade Love Story (2020–2021)
- Hometown (2021)
- Hometown Cha-Cha-Cha (2021)
- Hong Gil-dong (2008)
- Hong Kong Express (2005)
- Honour (2026)
- Hospital Playlist (2020–2021)
- Hospital Ship (2017)
- Hot Blood (2009)
- Hot Stove League (2019–2020)
- Hotel del Luna (2019)
- Hotel King (2014)
- Hotelier (2001)
- House of Bluebird (2015)
- How Are U Bread (2020)
- How Long I've Kissed (2012)
- How Should I Be (2002)
- How to Be Thirty (2021)
- How to Buy a Friend (2020)
- How to Meet a Perfect Neighbor (2007)
- Human Vapor (2026)
- Hunter with a Scalpel (2025)
- Hur Jun (1999–2000)
- Hur Jun, The Original Story (2013)
- Hush (2020–2021)
- Hwang Jini (2006)
- Hwarang: The Poet Warrior Youth (2016–2017)
- Hyde Jekyll, Me (2015)
- Hyena (2020)
- Hyper Knife (2025)

== I ==
- I Am a Running Mate (2025)
- I Am Legend (2010)
- I Am Sam (2007)
- I Am the Mother Too (2018)
- I Can Hear Your Voice (2013)
- I Do, I Do (2012)
- I Have a Lover (2015–2016)
- I Love Lee Taly (2012)
- I Need Romance (2011)
- I Need Romance 2012 (2012)
- I Need Romance 3 (2014)
- I Order You (2015)
- I Picked Up a Celebrity on the Street (2018)
- I Wanna Hear Your Song (2019)
- I'm After You (2015)
- I'm Not a Robot (2017–2018)
- I'm Sorry, But I Love You (2016–2017)
- I'm Sorry, I Love You (2004)
- Ice Adonis (2012)
- Ice Girl (2005)
- Idol Drama Operation Team (2017)
- Idol I (2025–2026)
- Idol: The Coup (2021)
- If Tomorrow Comes (2011–2012)
- If Wishes Could Kill (2026)
- If You Wish Upon Me (2022)
- Iljimae (1993)
- Iljimae (2008)
- Imaginary Cat (2015–2016)
- Imitation (2021)
- Immortal Admiral Yi Sun-sin (2004–2005)
- In Your Radiant Season (2026)
- In-soon Is Pretty (2007)
- Incarnation of Money (2013)
- Innocent Defendant (2017)
- Insider (2022)
- Inspector Koo (2021)
- Inspiring Generation (2014)
- Insu, the Queen Mother (2011–2012)
- Into the Flames (2014)
- Introverted Boss (2017)
- Invincible Lee Pyung Kang (2009)
- Ireland (2004)
- Iris (2009)
- Iris II: New Generation (2013)
- Iron Family (2024)
- Island (2022–2023)
- It Was Love (2012–2013)
- It's Beautiful Now (2022)
- It's My Life (2018–2019)
- It's Okay to Not Be Okay (2020)
- It's Okay, Daddy's Girl (2010–2011)
- It's Okay, That's Love (2014)
- Itaewon Class (2020)
- Item (2019)

== J ==
- Ja Myung Go (2009)
- Jang Bo-ri Is Here! (2014)
- Jang Ok-jung, Living by Love (2013)
- Jang Yeong-sil (2016)
- Jazz for Two (2024)
- Jealousy (1992)
- Jejungwon (2010)
- Jeon Woo-chi (2012–2013)
- Jeong Do-jeon (2014)
- Jeongnyeon: The Star Is Born (2024)
- Jewel in the Palace (2003–2004)
- Ji Woon-soo's Stroke of Luck (2012)
- Jikji (2005)
- Jinxed at First (2022)
- Jirisan (2021)
- Jolly Widows (2009–2010)
- Joseon Attorney (2023)
- Joseon Exorcist (2021)
- Joseon Survival Period (2019)
- Joseon X-Files (2010)
- JTBC Drama Festa (2017–present)
  - Hello Dracula (2020)
- Judge vs. Judge (2017–2018)
- Jugglers (2017–2018)
- Jumong (2006–2007)
- Jump (1999)
- Jungle Fish (2008)
- Jungle Fish 2 (2010)
- Junwoo (1975–1978)
- Just Dance (2018)
- Justice (2019)
- Juvenile Justice (2022)

== K ==
- Kairos (2020)
- Karma (2025)
- KBS Drama Special (2010–present)
  - Do You Know Taekwondo? (2012)
  - If We Were a Season (2017)
  - My Prettiest Moments (2012)
  - Pianist (2010)
  - Review Notebook of My Embarrassing Days (2018)
- KBS TV Novel (1987–2018)
  - A Sea of Her Own (2017)
  - Dal Soon's Spring (2017–2018)
  - Dear My Sister (2011–2012)
  - Eunhui (2013–2014)
  - In Still Green Days (2015)
  - Land of Gold (2014)
  - Landscape in My Heart (2007)
  - Love, My Love (2012–2013)
  - My Mind's Flower Rain (2016)
  - Samsaengi (2013)
  - Single-minded Dandelion (2014–2015)
  - Sunok (2006)
  - That Sun in the Sky (2016–2017)
  - The Stars Are Shining (2015–2016)
  - Through the Waves (2018)
- Kick Kick Kick Kick (2025)
- Kill Heel (2022)
- Kill It (2019)
- Kill Me, Heal Me (2015)
- Kim Is a Genius (2019)
- Kim Su-ro, The Iron King (2010)
- Kimcheed Radish Cubes (2007–208)
- Kimchi Cheese Smile (2007–2008)
- Kimchi Family (2011–2012)
- King of Ambition (2013)
- King the Land (2023)
- Kingdom (2019–2021)
- Kingmaker: The Change of Destiny (2020)
- Kiss Sixth Sense (2022)
- Kkondae Intern (2020)
- Knight Flower (2024)
- Knock-Off (TBA)
- Kokdu: Season of Deity (2023)
- Korea–Khitan War (2023–2024)
- Korean Peninsula (2012)

== L ==
- L.U.C.A.: The Beginning (2021)
- Lady Cha Dal-rae's Lover (2018–2019)
- Land of Wine (2003)
- Last (2015)
- Last Scandal (2008)
- Last Summer (2025)
- Late Night Restaurant (2015)
- Law and the City (2025)
- Law School (2021)
- Lawless Lawyer (2018)
- Lawyers (2005)
- Lee San, Wind of the Palace (2007–2008)
- Left-Handed Wife (2019)
- Legal High (2019)
- Legend of Hyang Dan (2007)
- Legend of the Patriots (2010)
- Less Than Evil (2018–2019)
- Let Me Be Your Knight (2021–2022)
- Let Me Introduce Her (2018)
- Let's Eat (2013–2014)
- Let's Eat 2 (2015)
- Let's Eat 3 (2018)
- Level Up (2019)
- Leverage (2019)
- Liar Game (2014)
- Lie After Lie (2020)
- Lie to Me (2011)
- Lies Hidden in My Garden (2023)
- Life (2018)
- Life Is Beautiful (2010)
- Life on Mars (2018)
- Lights and Shadows (2011–2012)
- Light on Me (2021)
- Light Shop (2024)
- Like Flowers in Sand (2023–2024)
- Likeable or Not (2007–2008)
- Line Romance (2014)
- Link: Eat, Love, Kill (2022)
- Listen to Love (2016)
- Listen to My Heart (2011)
- Little Women (2022)
- Live (2018)
- Live On (2020–2021)
- Live Up to Your Name (2017)
- Live Your Own Life (2023–2024)
- Liver or Die (2019)
- Living Among the Rich (2011–2012)
- Living in Style (2011–2012)
- Lobbyist (2007)
- Local Hero (2016)
- Longing for You (2023)
- Look Back in Anger (2000)
- Loss Time Life (2019)
- Lost (2021)
- Love.exe (2025)
- Love & Secret (2014–2015)
- Love (ft. Marriage and Divorce) (2021–2022)
- Love Again (2012)
- Love Alarm (2019–2021)
- Love Alert (2018)
- Love All Play (2022)
- Love and Obsession (2009–2010)
- Love Andante (2024)
- Love Can't Wait (2006)
- Love for a Thousand More (2016)
- Love for Love's Sake (2025)
- Love in 3 Colors (1999)
- Love in Contract (2022)
- Love in Her Bag (2013)
- Love in Sadness (2019)
- Love in Sync (2026)
- Love in the Big City (2024)
- Love in the Moonlight (2016)
- Love Is for Suckers (2022)
- Love Letter (2003)
- Love Me (2025–2026)
- Love Me When You Can (2006–2007)
- Love Next Door (2024)
- Love on a Rooftop (2015)
- Love on the Menu (2026)
- Love Phobia (2026)
- Love Playlist (2017–2019)
- Love Rain (2012)
- Love Returns (2017–2018)
- Love Revolution (2020)
- Love Scene Number (2021)
- Love Scout (2025)
- Love Song for Illusion (2024)
- Love Story in Harvard (2004–2005)
- Love to Hate You (2023)
- Love to the End (2018)
- Love Truly (2006)
- Love Twist (2021–2022)
- Love with Flaws (2019–2020)
- Love Your Enemy (2024)
- Love, Take Two (2025)
- Loveholic (2005)
- Lovely Horribly (2018)
- Lovely Runner (2024)
- Lovers (2006–2007)
- Lovers in Bloom (2017)
- Lovers in Paris (2004)
- Lovers in Prague (2005)
- Lovers of Haeundae (2012)
- Lovers of Music (2014)
- Lovers of the Red Sky (2021)
- Lovestruck in the City (2020–2021)
- Loving You a Thousand Times (2009–2010)
- Low Life (2025)
- LTNS (2024)
- Lucifer (2007)
- Lucky Romance (2016)

== M ==
- Ma Boy (2012)
- Mackerel Run (2007)
- Mad Concrete Dreams (2026)
- Mad Dog (2017)
- Mad for Each Other (2021)
- Madame Antoine: The Love Therapist (2016)
- Made in Korea (2025–2026)
- Maestra: Strings of Truth (2023–2024)
- Magic Cellphone (2016)
- Magic Kid Masuri (2002–2004)
- Make a Woman Cry (2015)
- Make Me Tingle (2026)
- Make Your Wish (2014–2015)
- Mama (2014)
- Mama Fairy and the Woodcutter (2018)
- Man from the Equator (2012)
- Man in a Veil (2020–2021)
- Man in the Kitchen (2017–2018)
- Man to Man (2017)
- Man Who Dies to Live (2017)
- Manhole (2017)
- Manny (2011)
- Marie and Her Three Daddies (2025–2026)
- Marriage Contract (2016)
- Marriage, Not Dating (2014)
- Marry Him If You Dare (2013)
- Marry Me Now (2018)
- Marry Me, Mary! (2010)
- Marry My Husband (2024)
- Marry You (2024)
- Marrying a Millionaire (2005–2006)
- Marrying My Daughter Twice (2016)
- Mary Kills People (2025)
- Mask (2015)
- Mask Girl (2023)
- Master of Study (2010)
- Master's Sun (2013)
- Matrimonial Chaos (2018)
- May I Help You? (2022)
- May It Please the Court (2022)
- May Queen (2012)
- May the Congressman Protect You (TBA)
- Me Too, Flower! (2011)
- Meant to Be (2023)
- Medical Top Team (2013)
- Melancholia (2021)
- Melo Movie (2025)
- Melody of Love (2013–2014)
- Meloholic (2017)
- Melting Me Softly (2019)
- Memories of the Alhambra (2018–2019)
- Memorials (2020)
- Memorist (2020)
- Memory (2016)
- Men Are Men (2020)
- Mental Coach Jegal (2022)
- Mercy for None (2025)
- Merry Mary (2007)
- Midas (2011)
- Military Prosecutor Doberman (2022)
- Mimi (2014)
- Mina (2001)
- Mine (2021)
- Miracle (2022)
- Miraculous Brothers (2023)
- Misaeng: Incomplete Life (2014)
- Miss Ajumma (2011)
- Miss Korea (2013–2014)
- Miss Lee (2019)
- Miss Mamma Mia (2015)
- Miss Mermaid (2002–2003)
- Miss Monte-Cristo (2021)
- Miss Night and Day (2024)
- Miss Panda and Mr. Hedgehog (2012)
- Miss Ripley (2011)
- Missing 9 (2017)
- Missing Crown Prince (2024)
- Missing You (2012–2013)
- Missing: The Other Side (2020–2023)
- Mistress (2018)
- Misty (2018)
- Model (1997)
- Modern Farmer (2014)
- Mom and Sister (2000–2001)
- Mom Has an Affair (2020)
- Mom's Dead Upset (2008)
- Money Flower (2017–2018)
- Money Game (2020)
- Money Heist: Korea – Joint Economic Area (2022)
- Monstar (2013)
- Monster (2016)
- Monstrous (2022)
- Monthly Magazine Home (2021)
- Moon Embracing the Sun (2012)
- Moon in the Day (2023)
- Moon Lovers: Scarlet Heart Ryeo (2016)
- Moon River (2025)
- Moonshine (2021–2022)
- Moorim School: Saga of the Brave (2016)
- More Than a Maid (2015)
- More Than Friends (2020)
- Motel California (2025)
- Mother (2018)
- Mother and Mom (2025)
- Mother of Mine (2019)
- Mother's Garden (2014)
- Mouse (2021)
- Move to Heaven (2021)
- Moving (2023)
- Mr. Back (2014)
- Mr. Duke (2000)
- Mr. Plankton (2024)
- Mr. Queen (2020–2021)
- Mr. Sunshine (2018)
- Mrs. Cop (2015–2016)
- Ms. Hammurabi (2018)
- Ms. Incognito (2025)
- Ms. Kim's Million Dollar Quest (2004)
- Ms. Ma, Nemesis (2018)
- Ms. Perfect (2017)
- My 19 Year Old Sister-in-Law (2004)
- My Absolute Boyfriend (2019)
- My Beautiful Bride (2015)
- My Beloved Sister (2006–2007)
- My Bias, My Boss (2026)
- My Bittersweet Life (2011)
- My Catman (2017)
- My Contracted Husband, Mr. Oh (2018)
- My Country: The New Age (2019)
- My Dangerous Wife (2020)
- My Daughter the Flower (2011–2012)
- My Daughter, Geum Sa-wol (2015–2016)
- My Dear Cat (2014)
- My Dearest (2023)
- My Dearest Nemesis (2025)
- My Demon (2023–2024)
- My Fair Lady (2003)
- My Fair Lady (2009)
- My Fair Lady (2016–2017)
- My Fantastic Funeral (2015)
- My Father Is Strange (2017)
- My Fellow Citizens! (2019)
- My First First Love (2019)
- My First Love (2018)
- My First Time (2015)
- My Girl (2005–2006)
- My Girlfriend Is a Gumiho (2010)
- My Girlfriend Is the Man! (2025)
- My Golden Life (2017–2018)
- My Happy Ending (2023–2024)
- My Healing Love (2018–2019)
- My Heart Twinkle Twinkle (2015)
- My Holo Love (2020)
- My Horrible Boss (2016)
- My Husband Got a Family (2012)
- My Husband's Woman (2007)
- My Kids Give Me a Headache (2012–2013)
- My Lawyer, Mr. Jo (2016)
- My Lawyer, Mr. Jo 2: Crime and Punishment (2019)
- My Liberation Notes (2022)
- My Little Baby (2016)
- My Love By My Side (2011)
- My Love from the Star (2013–2014)
- My Love Patzzi (2002)
- My Love Toram (2005)
- My Lovely Boxer (2023)
- My Lovely Girl (2014)
- My Lovely Journey (2025)
- My Lovely Liar (2023)
- My Lovely Sam Soon (2005)
- My Lover, Madame Butterfly (2012–2013)
- My Man Is Cupid (2023–2024)
- My Merry Marriage (2024)
- My Military Valentine (2024)
- My Mister (2018)
- My Mother Is a Daughter-in-law (2015)
- My Name (2021)
- My Only Love Song (2017)
- My Only One (2018–2019)
- My Perfect Stranger (2023)
- My Precious You (2008–2009)
- My Princess (2011)
- My Roommate Is a Gumiho (2021)
- My Rosy Life (2005)
- My Royal Nemesis (2026)
- My Runway (2016)
- My Sassy Girl (2017)
- My Secret Hotel (2014)
- My Secret Romance (2017)
- My Secret Terrius (2018)
- My Spring Days (2014)
- My Strange Hero (2018–2019)
- My Sweet Mobster (2024)
- My Too Perfect Sons (2009)
- My Troublesome Star (2025)
- My Unfamiliar Family (2020)
- My Unfortunate Boyfriend (2015)
- My Youth (2025)
- My YouTube Diary (2019–2020)
- Mysterious Personal Shopper (2018)
- Mystic Pop-up Bar (2020)

== N ==
- Naeil's Cantabile (2014)
- Naked Fireman (2017)
- Namib (2024)
- Narco-Saints (2022)
- Navillera (2021)
- Never Forget Your Enemy (2026)
- Never Twice (2019–2020)
- Nevertheless (2021)
- New Heart (2007–2008)
- New Tales of Gisaeng (2011)
- Newtopia (2025)
- Nice to Not Meet You (2025)
- Nice Witch (2018)
- Night Has Come (2023)
- Night Light (2016–2017)
- Nine (2013)
- Nine Puzzles (2025)
- No Gain No Love (2024)
- No Matter What (2020–2021)
- No Mercy (2025)
- No Way Out: The Roulette (2024)
- No Tail to Tell (2026)
- No, Thank You (2020–2021)
- Noble, My Love (2015)
- Nobody Knows (2020)
- Nokdu Flower (2019)
- Nonstop (2000–2006)
- Not Others (2023)
- Notes from the Last Row (2026)
- Nothing Uncovered (2024)
- Now in Pyongyang (1982–1985)
- Now, We Are Breaking Up (2021–2022)
- Numbers (2023)

== O ==
- Oasis (2023)
- OB & GY (2010)
- Oh Feel Young (2014)
- Oh My Baby (2020)
- Oh My Ghost (2015)
- Oh My Ghost Clients (2025)
- Oh My Ladylord (2021)
- Oh My Venus (2015–2016)
- Oh! My Lady (2010)
- Oh! Youngsim (2023)
- Oh, the Mysterious (2017–2018)
- Ohlala Couple (2012)
- Ojakgyo Family (2011–2012)
- On Air (2008)
- On the Verge of Insanity (2021)
- On the Way to the Airport (2016)
- Once Again (2020)
- Once Upon a Small Town (2022)
- One-of-a-Kind Romance (2026)
- One Dollar Lawyer (2022)
- One Fine Day (2006)
- One Mom and Three Dads (2008)
- One More Happy Ending (2016)
- One More Time (2017)
- One Ordinary Day (2021)
- One Spring Night (2019)
- One Sunny Day (2014–2015)
- One the Woman (2021)
- One Warm Word (2013–2014)
- One Well-Raised Daughter (2013–2014)
- One: High School Heroes (2025)
- Only Because It's You (2012–2013)
- Only Love (2014)
- Only You (2005)
- Operation Proposal (2012)
- Orange Marmalade (2015)
- Our Beloved Summer (2021–2022)
- Our Blooming Youth (2023)
- Our Blues (2022)
- Our Chocolate Moments (2025)
- Our Dating Sim (2023)
- Our Gap-soon (2016–2017)
- Our Golden Days (2025–2026)
- Our Happy Days (2026)
- Our Movie (2025)
- Our Sticky Love (2026)
- Our Universe (2026)
- Our Unwritten Seoul (2025)
- Over the Rainbow (2006)

== P ==
- Pachinko (2022–2024)
- Padam Padam (2011–2012)
- Page Turner (2016)
- Painter of the Wind (2008)
- Pale Moon (2023)
- Pandora: Beneath the Paradise (2023)
- Papa (1996)
- Paradise Ranch (2011)
- Parasyte: The Grey (2024)
- Parole Examiner Lee (2024)
- Partners for Justice (2018–2019)
- Passionate Love (2013–2014)
- Pasta (2010)
- Payback: Money and Power (2023)
- Pearl in Red (2026)
- Pegasus Market (2019)
- Perfect Crown (2026)
- Perfect Family (2024)
- Perfect Marriage Revenge (2023)
- Perfume (2019)
- Persona (2019)
- Personal Taste (2010)
- Phantom (2012)
- Phantom Lawyer (2026)
- Phoenix (2004)
- Phoenix 2020 (2020–2021)
- Piano (2001–2002)
- Pied Piper (2016)
- Pink Lipstick (2010)
- Pinocchio (2014–2015)
- Player (2018–2024)
- Playful Kiss (2010)
- Please Come Back, Soon-ae (2006)
- Please Don't Date Him (2020–2021)
- Plus Nine Boys (2014)
- Police University (2021)
- Poong, the Joseon Psychiatrist (2022–2023)
- Portraits of Delusion (2026)
- Poseidon (2011)
- Positively Yours (2026)
- Possessed (2019)
- Potato Star 2013QR3 (2013–2014)
- Pots of Gold (2013)
- Power Rangers Dino Force Brave (2017)
- Precious Family (2004–2005)
- Pride and Prejudice (2014–2015)
- Priest (2018–2019)
- Prime Minister & I (2013–2014)
- Prince Hours (2007)
- Princess Aurora (2013–2014)
- Princess Hours (2006)
- Princess Lulu (2005)
- Prison Playbook (2017–2018)
- Private Lives (2020)
- Pro Bono (2025–2026)
- Prosecutor Princess (2010)
- Protect the Boss (2011)
- Psychopath Diary (2019–2020)
- Pump Up the Healthy Love (2025)
- Punch (2014–2015)
- Pure Love (2013)
- Pure Pumpkin Flower (2010–2011)
- Pyramid Game (2024)

== Q ==
- Que Sera Sera (2007)
- Queen and I (2012)
- Queen for Seven Days (2017)
- Queen Mantis (2025)
- Queen of Divorce (2024)
- Queen of Housewives (2009)
- Queen of Masks (2023)
- Queen of Mystery (2017)
- Queen of Mystery 2 (2018)
- Queen of Reversals (2010–2011)
- Queen of Tears (2024)
- Queen Seondeok (2009)
- Queen Woo (2024)
- Queen: Love and War (2019–2020)
- Queen's House (2025)
- Queenmaker (2023)
- Quiz of God (2010–2019)

== R ==
- Racket Boys (2021)
- Radiant Office (2017)
- Radio Romance (2018)
- Rain or Shine (2017–2018)
- Reborn Rich (2022)
- Reborn Rookie (2026)
- Recipe for Farewell (2022–2023)
- Recipe for Love (2026)
- Record of Youth (2020)
- Red Balloon (2022–2023)
- Red Shoes (2021)
- Red Swan (2024)
- Reflection of You (2021)
- Remarriage & Desires (2022)
- Remember (2015–2016)
- Remember, Hari (2018–2019)
- Replay: The Moment (2021)
- Reply Series (2012–2016)
  - Reply 1988 (2015–2016)
  - Reply 1994 (2013)
  - Reply 1997 (2012)
- Reset (2014)
- Resident Playbook (2025)
- Resurrection (2005)
- Return (2018)
- Reunited Worlds (2017)
- Revenant (2023)
- Revenge of Others (2022)
- Reverse (2017–2018)
- Reverse (2026)
- Revolutionary Love (2017)
- Revolutionary Sisters (2021)
- Rich Man (2018)
- Righteous Love (2014–2015)
- Risky Romance (2018)
- River Where the Moon Rises (2021)
- Road No. 1 (2010)
- Robber (2008)
- Romance (2002)
- Romance in the House (2024)
- Romance Is a Bonus Book (2019)
- Romance Town (2011)
- Romance Zero (2009)
- Romantics Anonymous (2025)
- Rooftop Prince (2012)
- Rookie Cops (2022)
- Rookie Historian Goo Hae-ryung (2019)
- Room No. 9 (2018)
- Rose Mansion (2022)
- Rosy Lovers (2014–2015)
- Royal Family (2011)
- Royal Secret Agent (2020–2021)
- Royal Story: Jang Hui-bin (2002–2003)
- Ruby Ring (2013–2014)
- Ruby Ruby Love (2017)
- Rugal (2020)
- Ruler of Your Own World (2002)
- Run (2020)
- Run On (2020–2021)
- Run, Jang-mi (2014–2015)
- Rustic Period (2002–2003)

== S ==
- S Line (2025)
- Sad Love Story (2005)
- Saimdang, Memoir of Colors (2017)
- Salamander Guru and The Shadows (2012)
- Salon de Holmes (2025)
- Salut D'Amour (1994–1995)
- Sandglass (1995)
- Sang Doo! Let's Go to School (2003)
- Sassy Girl Chun-hyang (2005)
- Save Me (2017)
- Save Me 2 (2019)
- Save the Family (2015)
- Save the Last Dance for Me (2004–2005)
- Say It with Your Eyes (2000–2001)
- Scent of a Woman (2011)
- School Series (1999–present)
  - School 2013 (2012–2013)
  - School 2017 (2017)
  - School 2021 (2021–2022)
  - Who Are You: School 2015 (2015)
- Schoolgirl Detectives (2014–2015)
- Search (2020)
- Search: WWW (2019)
- Second 20s (2015)
- Second Shot at Love (2025)
- Second to Last Love (2016)
- Secret (2000)
- Secret Affair (2014)
- Secret Boutique (2019)
- Secret Campus (2006)
- Secret Door (2014)
- Secret Garden (2010–2011)
- Secret Healer (2016)
- Secret Love (2013)
- Secret Mother (2018)
- Secret Queen Makers (2018)
- Secret Relationships (2025)
- Secret Royal Inspector & Joy (2021)
- Secrets and Lies (2018–2019)
- Secrets of Women (2016)
- See You at Work Tomorrow! (2026)
- See You in My 19th Life (2023)
- Sell Your Haunted House (2021)
- Semantic Error (2022)
- Seoul 1945 (2006)
- Seoul Busters (2024)
- Seoyoung, My Daughter (2012–2013)
- Serendipity's Embrace (2024)
- Sexi Mong (2007)
- SF8 (2020)
- Shadow Detective (2022–2023)
- Shark: The Storm (2025)
- Sharp (2003–2007)
- She Knows Everything (2020)
- She Was Pretty (2015)
- She Would Never Know (2021)
- Shin Don (2005–2006)
- Shin's Project (2025)
- Shine or Go Crazy (2015)
- Shining Romance (2013–2014)
- Shooting Stars (2022)
- Shopping King Louie (2016)
- Short (2018)
- Should We Kiss First? (2018)
- Show Window: The Queen's House (2021–2022)
- Shut Up & Let's Go (2012)
- Sign (2011)
- Signal (2016)
- Single Dad in Love (2008)
- Siren's Kiss (2026)
- Sisters of the Sea (2005–2006)
- Sisters-in-Law (2017)
- Sisyphus: The Myth (2021)
- Six Flying Dragons (2015–2016)
- Sketch (2018)
- Sky Castle (2018–2019)
- Smile Again (2006)
- Smile Again (2010–2011)
- Smile, Mom (2010–2011)
- Smile, You (2009–2010)
- Snow Flower (2006–2007)
- Snow White's Revenge (2024)
- Snowdrop (2021–2022)
- So I Married the Anti-fan (2021)
- So Not Worth It (2021)
- Social Savvy Class 101 (2024)
- Sold Out on You (2026)
- Solomon's Perjury (2016–2017)
- Somebody (2022)
- Someday (2006)
- Something About 1% (2003)
- Something About 1% (2016)
- Something Happened in Bali (2004)
- Something in the Rain (2018)
- Song of the Bandits (2023)
- Songgot: The Piercer (2015)
- Sorry Not Sorry (2024)
- Soul (2009)
- Soul Mechanic (2020)
- Soundtrack 1 (2022)
- Soundtrack 2 (2023)
- Special Affairs Team TEN (2011–2013)
- Special Labor Inspector (2019)
- Spice Up Our Love (2024)
- Spirit Fingers (2025)
- Splash Splash Love (2015)
- Splendid Politics (2015)
- Sponsor (2022)
- Spooky in Love (2026)
- Spotlight (2008)
- Spring Day (2005)
- Spring Fever (2026)
- Spring of Youth (2025)
- Spring Turns to Spring (2019)
- Spy (2015)
- Spy Myung-wol (2011)
- Squad 38 (2016)
- Squid Game (2021–2025)
- Stained Glass (2004–2005)
- Stairway to Heaven (2003–2004)
- Standby (2012)
- Star in My Heart (1997)
- Stars Falling from the Sky (2010)
- Start-Up (2020)
- Star's Echo (2004)
- Star's Lover (2008–2009)
- Steal Heart (2014)
- Stealer: The Treasure Keeper (2023)
- Still 17 (2018)
- Still Shining (2026)
- Still You (2012)
- Stranger (2017–2020)
- Strangers 6 (2012)
- Strangers Again (2023)
- Strangers from Hell (2019)
- Strong Girl Bong-soon (2017)
- Strong Girl Nam-soon (2023)
- Strongest Chil Woo (2008)
- Strongest Deliveryman (2017)
- Study Group (2025)
- Style (2009)
- Successful Story of a Bright Girl (2002)
- Suits (2018)
- Suji & Uri (2024)
- Summer Strike (2022)
- Summer Vacation (2026)
- Sungkyunkwan Scandal (2010)
- Sunlight Pours Down (2004)
- Sunny Again Tomorrow (2018)
- Super Daddy Yeol (2015)
- Super Junior Unbelievable Story (2008)
- Super Rookie (2005)
- Surely Tomorrow (2025–2026)
- Surgeon Bong Dal-hee (2007)
- Suspicious Partner (2017)
- Swallow the Sun (2009)
- Sweden Laundry (2014–2015)
- Sweet 18 (2004)
- Sweet Buns (2004–2005)
- Sweet Enemy (2017)
- Sweet Home (2020–2024)
- Sweet Home, Sweet Honey (2015–2016)
- Sweet Munchies (2020)
- Sweet Revenge (2017–2018)
- Sweet Revenge 2 (2018)
- Sweet Spy (2005–2006)
- Sweet Stranger and Me (2016)
- Sweet Temptation (2015)
- Sweet, Savage Family (2015–2016)
- Switch (2018)
- Sword & Silence (2026–2027)
- Syndrome (2012)

== T ==
- Taejo Wang Geon (2000–2002)
- Take Care of Us, Captain (2012)
- Tale of the Nine Tailed (2020)
- Tale of the Nine Tailed 1938 (2023)
- Tamra, the Island (2009)
- Tantara (2026)
- Tarot (2024)
- Tastefully Yours (2025)
- Tasty Life (2012)
- Taxi Driver (2021–present)
- Tazza (2008)
- Teach You a Lesson (2026)
- Team Bulldog: Off-Duty Investigation (2020)
- Tears of Heaven (2014–2015)
- Tears of the Dragon (1996–1998)
- Tell Me That You Love Me (2023–2024)
- Tell Me What You Saw (2020)
- Temperature of Love (2017)
- Temptation (2014)
- Temptation of an Angel (2009)
- Temptation of Wife (2008–2009)
- Tempest (2025)
- Tempted (2018)
- Terroir (2008–2009)
- Thank You (2007)
- That Winter, the Wind Blows (2013)
- The 101st Proposal (2006)
- The 8 Show (2024)
- The Accidental Couple (2009)
- The All-Round Wife (2021–2022)
- The Apartment Job (2026)
- The Art of Negotiation (2025)
- The Art of Sarah (2026)
- The Atypical Family (2024)
- The Auditors (2024)
- The Banker (2019)
- The Beauty Inside (2018)
- The Bequeathed (2024)
- The Birth of a Family (2012–2013)
- The Blade and Petal (2013)
- The Blue Road (2026)
- The Brave Yong Su-jeong (2024)
- The Bride of Habaek (2017)
- The Chaser (2012)
- The City Hall (2009)
- The Clinic for Married Couples: Love and War (1999–2009)
- The Cursed (2020)
- The Crowned Clown (2019)
- The Dawn of the Empire (2002–2003)
- The Deal (2023)
- The Defects (2025)
- The Devil Judge (2021)
- The Divorce Insurance (2025)
- The Doctors (2016)
- The Dream Life of Mr. Kim (2025)
- The Duo (2011)
- The East Palace (2026)
- The Eldest (2013–2014)
- The Elegant Empire (2023–2024)
- The Emperor: Owner of the Mask (2017)
- The Empire (2022)
- The End of the World (2013)
- The Escape of the Seven (2023–2024)
- The Fabulous (2022)
- The Family is Coming (2015)
- The Fiery Priest (2019–2024)
- The First Man (2025–2026)
- The First Night with the Duke (2025)
- The First Responders (2022–2023)
- The Forbidden Marriage (2022–2023)
- The Frog (2024)
- The Fugitive of Joseon (2013)
- The Fugitive: Plan B (2010)
- The Game: Towards Zero (2020)
- The Gentlemen of Wolgyesu Tailor Shop (2016–2017)
- The Ghost Detective (2018)
- The Glory (2022–2023)
- The Golden Garden (2019)
- The Golden Spoon (2022)
- The Good Bad Mother (2023)
- The Good Detective (2020)
- The Good Wife (2016)
- The Great King, Sejong (2008)
- The Great Merchant (2010)
- The Great Seer (2012–2013)
- The Great Shaman Ga Doo-shim (2021)
- The Great Show (2019)
- The Greatest Love (2011)
- The Greatest Marriage (2014)
- The Guardians (2017)
- The Guest (2018)
- The Happy Loner (2017)
- The Haunted Palace (2025)
- The Heirs (2013)
- The Heavenly Idol (2023)
- The Husband (2026)
- The Hymn of Death (2018)
- The Idle Mermaid (2014)
- The Idolmaster KR (2017)
- The Impossible Heir (2024)
- The Innocent Man (2012)
- The Interest of Love (2022–2023)
- The Jingbirok: A Memoir of Imjin War (2015)
- The Judge from Hell (2024)
- The Judge Returns (2026)
- The K2 (2016)
- The Kidnapping Day (2023)
- The Killer's Shopping List (2022)
- The Killing Vote (2023)
- The King 2 Hearts (2012)
- The King and I (2007–2008)
- The King and the Queen (1998–2000)
- The King in Love (2017)
- The King of Chudong Palace (1983)
- The King of Dramas (2012–2013)
- The King of Legend (2010–2011)
- The King of Pigs (2022)
- The King of Tears, Lee Bang-won (2021–2022)
- The King: Eternal Monarch (2020)
- The King's Affection (2021)
- The King's Daughter, Soo Baek-hyang (2013–2014)
- The King's Doctor (2012–2013)
- The King's Face (2014–2015)
- The Kingdom of the Winds (2008–2009)
- The Lady in Dignity (2017)
- The Last Empress (2018–2019)
- The Last Match (1994)
- The Law Cafe (2022)
- The Legend (2007)
- The Legend of Kitchen Soldier (2026)
- The Legend of the Blue Sea (2016–2017)
- The Liar and His Lover (2017)
- The Lies Within (2019)
- The Light in Your Eyes (2019)
- The Love in Your Eyes (2022–2023)
- The Love Is Coming (2016)
- The Lover (2015)
- The Man in the Mask (2015)
- The Manipulated (2025)
- The Master of Revenge (2016)
- The Matchmakers (2023)
- The Merchant (2001–2002)
- The Merchant: Gaekju 2015 (2015–2016)
- The Midnight Romance in Hagwon (2024)
- The Midnight Studio (2024)
- The Miracle (2013)
- The Miracle We Met (2018)
- The Missing (2015)
- The Most Beautiful Goodbye (2017)
- The Murky Stream (2025)
- The Musical (2011)
- The Mysterious Class (2021)
- The Nice Guy (2025)
- The Noblesse (2014)
- The One and Only (2021–2022)
- The Package (2017)
- The Penthouse: War in Life (2020–2021)
- The Potato Lab (2025)
- The Practical Guide to Love (2026)
- The President (2010–2011)
- The Price of Confession (2025)
- The Princess' Man (2011)
- The Producers (2015)
- The Promise (2016)
- The Queen of Office (2013)
- The Queen Who Crowns (2025)
- The Queen's Classroom (2013)
- The Real Has Come! (2023)
- The Rebel (2017)
- The Red Sleeve (2021–2022)
- The Remarried Empress (2026)
- The Reputable Family (2010)
- The Return of Hwang Geum-bok (2015)
- The Return of Iljimae (2009)
- The Rich Son (2018)
- The Road Home (2009)
- The Road: The Tragedy of One (2021)
- The Royal Gambler (2016)
- The Running Mates: Human Rights (2019)
- The Scandal (2013)
- The Scandal (2026)
- The Scandal of Chunhwa (2025)
- The Scarecrow (2026)
- The Scholar Who Walks the Night (2015)
- The School Nurse Files (2020)
- The Second Husband (2021–2022)
- The Secret House (2022)
- The Secret Life of My Secretary (2019)
- The Secret Lovers (2005)
- The Secret of Birth (2013)
- The Secret of My Love (2017–2018)
- The Secret Romantic Guesthouse (2023)
- The Silent Sea (2021)
- The Slave Hunters (2010)
- The Slingshot (2009)
- The Smile Has Left Your Eyes (2018)
- The Snow Queen (2006–2007)
- The Sound of Magic (2022)
- The Sound of Your Heart (2016)
- The Spies Who Loved Me (2020)
- The Story of Kang-goo (2014)
- The Story of Park's Marriage Contract (2023–2024)
- The Substitute (2026)
- The Suspicious Housekeeper (2013)
- The Tale of Lady Ok (2024)
- The Tale of Nokdu (2019)
- The Third Charm (2018)
- The Third Hospital (2012)
- The Third Marriage (2023–2024)
- The Thorn Birds (2011)
- The Three Musketeers (2014)
- The Three Witches (2015–2016)
- The Time (2018)
- The Time We Were Not in Love (2015)
- The Trauma Code: Heroes on Call (2025–present)
- The Trunk (2024)
- The Two Sisters (2024)
- The Tyrant (2024)
- The Uncanny Counter (2020–2023)
- The Undateables (2018)
- The Vampire Detective (2016)
- The Veil (2021)
- The Village: Achiara's Secret (2015)
- The Vineyard Man (2006)
- The Virtual Bride (2015)
- The Virus (2013)
- The Wedding Scheme (2012)
- The Whirlwind (2024)
- The Wind Blows (2019)
- The Winning Try (2025)
- The Witch (2025)
- The Witch's Diner (2021)
- The Woman Who Still Wants to Marry (2010)
- The Woman Who Swallowed the Sun (2025)
- The Wonderfools (2026)
- The World of the Married (2020)
- The Worst of Evil (2023)
- Thirty-Nine (2022)
- This Is My Love (2015)
- Thousand Years of Love (2003)
- Three Bold Siblings (2022–2023)
- Three Brothers (2009–2010)
- Three Color Fantasy (2017)
  - Queen of the Ring (2017)
  - Romance Full of Life (2017)
  - The Universe's Star (2017)
- Three Days (2014)
- Three Friends (2000–2001)
- Three Sisters (2010)
- Thrice Married Woman (2013–2014)
- Through the Darkness (2022)
- Time Between Dog and Wolf (2007)
- Times (2021)
- To My Beloved (2012)
- To My Beloved Thief (2026)
- To the Beautiful You (2012)
- To the Moon (2025)
- To. Jenny (2018)
- Today's Webtoon (2022)
- Toji, the Land (2004–2005)
- Tokyo Sun Shower (2008)
- Tomorrow (2022)
- Tomorrow Boy (2016)
- Tomorrow, with You (2017)
- Top Management (2018)
- Top Star U-back (2018–2019)
- Touch (2020)
- Touch Your Heart (2019)
- Tracer (2022)
- Train (2020)
- Trap (2019)
- Tree of Heaven (2006)
- Triangle (2014)
- Trigger (2025)
- Trio (2002–2003)
- Triple (2009)
- Trolley (2022–2023)
- True Beauty (2020–2021)
- True to Love (2023)
- Tunnel (2017)
- Twelve (2025)
- Twelve Nights (2018)
- Twenty-Five Twenty-One (2022)
- Twenty-Twenty (2020)
- Twinkle Twinkle (2011)
- Twinkling Watermelon (2023)
- Two Cops (2017–2018)
- Two Mothers (2014)
- Two Outs in the Ninth Inning (2007)
- Two Weeks (2013)
- Two Wives (2009)
- Two Women's Room (2013–2014)
- Typhoon Family (2025)

== U ==
- Ugly Alert (2013)
- Ugly Miss Young-ae (2007–2019)
- Uinyeo Dae Jang Geum (TBA)
- Unasked Family (2019–2020)
- Uncle (2021–2022)
- Uncle Samsik (2024)
- Uncontrollably Fond (2016)
- Under the Gun (2024)
- Under the Queen's Umbrella (2022)
- Undercover (2021)
- Undercover High School (2025)
- Undercover Miss Hong (2026)
- Unframed (2021)
- Unfriend (TBA)
- Unkind Ladies (2015)
- Unknown Woman (2017)
- Unlock My Boss (2022–2023)
- Unmasked (2025)
- Unpredictable Family (2023–2024)
- Unstoppable Marriage (2007–2008)
- Until the Azalea Blooms (1998)
- Untouchable (2017–2018)

== V ==
- Vagabond (2019)
- Vampire Idol (2011–2012)
- Vampire Prosecutor (2011–2012)
- Vampire Detective (2016)
- Vengeance of the Bride (2022–2023)
- Vigilante (2023)
- Villains (2025–2026)
- Villains Everywhere (2025)
- Vincenzo (2021)
- VIP (2019)
- Voice (2017–2021)

== W ==
- W (2016)
- Walking on Thin Ice (2025)
- Wang's Family (2013–2014)
- Want a Taste? (2019–2020)
- Wanted (2016)
- War of Money (2007)
- Warm and Cozy (2015)
- Warrior Baek Dong-soo (2011)
- Was It Love? (2020)
- Watcher (2019)
- Way Back Love (2025)
- We Are All Trying Here (2026)
- We Are Dating Now (2002)
- We Broke Up (2015)
- Weak Hero (2022–2025)
- Wedding (2005)
- Wedding Impossible (2024)
- Wednesday 3:30 PM (2017)
- Weightlifting Fairy Kim Bok-joo (2016–2017)
- Welcome (2020)
- Welcome 2 Life (2019)
- Welcome Rain to My Life (2012)
- Welcome to Samdal-ri (2023–2024)
- Welcome to the Show (2011)
- Welcome to Waikiki (2018)
- Welcome to Waikiki 2 (2019)
- Welcome to Wedding Hell (2022)
- West Palace (1995)
- Whale Star: The Gyeongseong Mermaid (TV series) (2027)
- What a Boss Wants (2026)
- What Comes After Love (2024)
- What Happens to My Family? (2014–2015)
- What's for Dinner? (2009)
- What's Up (2011–2012)
- What's Up Fox (2006)
- What's Wrong with Secretary Kim (2018)
- When a Man Falls in Love (2013)
- When I Was the Most Beautiful (2020)
- When Life Gives You Tangerines (2025)
- When My Love Blooms (2020)
- When the Camellia Blooms (2019)
- When the Devil Calls Your Name (2019)
- When the Phone Rings (2024)
- When the Stars Gossip (2025)
- When the Weather Is Fine (2020)
- When Women Powder Twice (2011–2012)
- Where Stars Land (2018)
- Where Your Eyes Linger (2020)
- Which Star Are You From (2006)
- While You Were Sleeping (2011)
- While You Were Sleeping (2017)
- Whisper (2017)
- White Lie (2008–2009)
- White Nights 3.98 (1998)
- Who Are You? (2008)
- Who Are You? (2013)
- Who Is She (2024–2025)
- Why Her (2022)
- Wife Returns (2009–2010)
- Wild Romance (2012)
- Will It Snow for Christmas? (2009–2010)
- Will You Be My Manager? (2025)
- Witch at Court (2017)
- Witch Yoo Hee (2007)
- Witch's Love (2018)
- Wok of Love (2018)
- Woman in a Veil (2023)
- Woman of 9.9 Billion (2019–2020)
- Woman of Matchless Beauty, Park Jung-geum (2008)
- Woman with a Suitcase (2016)
- Women in the Sun (2008)
- Wonderful Days (2014)
- Wonderful Life (2005)
- Wonderful Mama (2013)
- Wonderful World (2024)
- Woori the Virgin (2022)
- Work Later, Drink Now (2021–2023)
- Working Mom (2008)
- Working Mom Parenting Daddy (2016)
- Worlds Within (2008)
- Would You Marry Me? (2025)
- Wuri's Family (2001–2002)

== X ==
- XX (2020)

== Y ==
- Yeon Gaesomun (2006–2007)
- Yeonnam-dong 539 (2018)
- YG Future Strategy Office (2018)
- Yonder (2022)
- Yong-pal (2015)
- You and Everything Else (2025)
- You and I (1997–1998)
- You Are a Gift (2016)
- You Are My Destiny (2008–2009)
- You Are My Destiny (2014)
- You Are My Spring (2021)
- You Are the Best! (2013)
- You Are the Boss! (2013)
- You Are the Only One (2014–2015)
- You Are Too Much (2017)
- You Don't Know Women (2010)
- You Drive Me Crazy (2018)
- You're All Surrounded (2014)
- You're Beautiful (2009)
- You're Only Mine (2014)
- Young Lady and Gentleman (2021–2022)
- Your Honor (2018)
- Your Honor (2024)
- Your House Helper (2018)
- Your Lady (2013)
- Your Neighbor's Wife (2013)
- Youth of May (2021)
- Yumi's Cells (2021–2026)

== Z ==
- Zombie Detective (2020)

== See also ==
- List of South Korean television series
- Television in South Korea
- List of South Korean actresses
- List of South Korean male actors
- List of programs broadcast by Arirang TV
- List of programs broadcast by JTBC
- List of programs broadcast by MBC TV
- List of programs broadcast by OCN
- List of programs broadcast by Seoul Broadcasting System
- List of programs broadcast by the Korean Broadcasting System
- List of programs broadcast by tvN (South Korean TV channel)
