= Lee Il-hwa =

South Korean actress (born 1971)

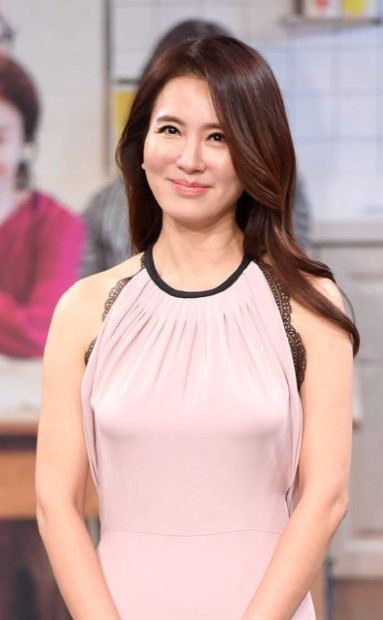
- Lee in August 2017
- Born: January 29, 1972 (age 54); Seoul, South Korea
- Education: Kyung Hee University
- Occupation: Actress
- Years active: 1991–present
- Agent: UMI Entertainment
- Spouses: Kang In-won (m. 1996; div. 1997) Unknown (m. 2011)

Korean name
- Hangul: 이일화
- RR: I Ilhwa
- MR: I Irhwa

Lee Il-hwa (Korean: 이일화; born January 29, 1972) is a South Korean actress. She made her acting debut in 1991, and has since appeared in numerous television dramas, notably the Reply series.

== Filmography ==
=== Film ===
Year	Title	Role	Notes/Ref.
1994	No Need to Justify Yearning	Yoon Soo-jin/Y	
2008	Frivolous Wife	Aunt-in-law	
2008	Romantic Island	Lee Yeon-sook	
2009	Bandhobi	Eun-joo	
2014	Fashion King	Woo Ki-myung's mother	
2015	The Accidental Detective	Noh Tae-soo's wife	
2017	Daddy You, Daughter Me	Won Sang-Tae's wife	
2018	The Accidental Detective 2: In Action	Noh Tae-soo's wife	
2021	Unfamiliar, Familiar	Sang-Hwa	
2022	My son	Su-won	
2022	Hero	Empress Myeongseong	Special appearance
2023	Count	Do-soon	
2024	My Name Is Loh Kiwan	Jeong-ju	

=== Television series ===
Year	Title	Role
1992	Calendula	
1992	Three Families Under One Roof	Dance teacher
1995	Hopefully the Sky	Go Hye-ryun
1995	Son of the Wind	Im Soo-yeon
1995	Elegy	
1995	Chanpumdanja	Yong-deok
1996	Sword	Han-wol
1996	Dangerous Love	Jin-sook
1996	Drama Game: "Love in the Celestial Sphere"	
1997	Sad Song of the Son-in-law	Myung-jin
1997	Today, for Some Reason	
1997	Love and Farewell	Eun Ha-young
1997	Lady	Eun-shil
1998	Eun-ah's Daughter	
2002	MBC Theater: "Kiss in a Veil"	Textile artist
2002	Sunflower Family	Kang Joo-young
2003	Rustic Period	Lee Young-sook
2003	HDTV Novel: "The Fragrant Well"	Kang Soo-ji
2003	Garden of Eve	Ru-bi
2004	Kkangsooni	Jung Eun-soo
2005	Drama City: "Second First Love"	Kyung-hee
2005	Queen of Conditions	Han Sung-woo's ex-wife
2005	Ballad of Seodong	Yeon Ga-mo
2005	Bizarre Bunch	Lee Ok-doo
2005	Jikji	Princess Soochoon
2006	Chomsungdae's Moon	Min-sook
2007	MBC Best Theater: "Dreamers"	Jung Min-kyung
2007	Good Day to Love	Ji-young
2007	It's OK Because I Love You	Young-hwa
2007	First Wives' Club	Jo Yong-hee
2007	Medical Gibang Cinema	Gye-wol
2008	Iljimae	Lady Han
2008	Returned Earthen Bowl	Yoon Ga-young
2008	Wife and Woman	Chae Yeo-jin
2008	General Hospital 2	Hyun-joo's mother (guest, episodes 9–10)
2009	Hometown Legends: "The Masked Ghost"	Lady Jeong
2009	Heading to the Ground	Maeng Geum-hee
2010	OB & GY	Lee Jung-joo (guest, episode 9)
2010	Prosecutor Princess	Ha Jung-ran
2010	Golden Fish	Moon Jung-won
2010	Jungle Fish 2	Lee Ra-yi's mother
2011	Midas	Kang In-sook
2011	You're Fine That Way	SPED teacher
2011	Quiz of God 2	Hwang Kyu-ri (guest, episode 5)
2011	Heartstrings	Song Ji-young
2011	Kimchi Family	Jung Geum-joo
2012	Wild Romance	Eun Ji Sook (Yoo Eun Jae's mother)
2012	Happy and	Jung-ja (episode 4 "Man Must Die to Live"); Ji-young (episode 8 "My Mother, Your Mother")
2012	Feast of the Gods	Song Yeon-woo's real mother (cameo)
2012	Love, My Love	Choi Myung-joo
2012	Reply 1997	Lee Il-hwa
2012	Seoyoung, My Daughter	Bang Shim-deok
2013	King of Ambition	Hong Ahn-shim
2013	Ugly Alert	Na In-sook
2013	Empire of Gold	Im Yoon-hee (cameo)
2013	Reply 1994	Lee Il-hwa
2013	My Love from the Star	Han Sun-young
2014	Jeong Do-jeon	Lady Kang (later Queen Sindeok)
2014	Let's Eat	Hyun Kwang-suk's mother (cameo, episode 16)
2014	Doctor Stranger	Lee Mi-sook
2014	Modern Farmer	Yoon Hye-jung
2014	Family Secret	Go Tae-hee
2015	Orange Marmalade	Kang Min-ha
2015	Loss: Time: Life	Hae-sook
2015	She Was Pretty	Han Jung-hye
2015	Reply 1988	Lee Il-hwa
2016	Choco Bank	Eun-haeng's mother
2016	The Master of Revenge	Go Kang-sook
2017	Good Manager	Jang Yoo-seon
2017	Man in the Kitchen	Jung Hwa-young
2017	Witch at Court	Kwak Young-sil
2018	Secrets and Lies	Oh Yeon-hee
2019	Her Private Life	Lee Sol
2020	Lie After Lie	Kim Ho-Ran
2020	Man in a Veil	Yoon Soo Hee
2021	Over to You	Ji-young (Cameo)
2021	The King's Affection	Queen Dae-Wang
2021–2022	Young Lady and Gentleman	Anna Kim
2022	Eve	Jang Moon-hee
2024	Beauty and Mr. Romantic	Jang Soo-yeon
2025	A Graceful Liar	Han Hye-ra

=== Television show ===
Year	Title	Role	Notes	Ref.
2025–2026	Reply 1988 10th Anniversary	Cast Member		

=== Web series ===
Year	Title	Role	Notes	Ref.
2021	Life Derm She	Goria	tvN D STUDIO	
2025	Butterfly	Mrs. Kim	Amazon Prime Video	

=== Music video appearances ===
Year	Title	Ref.
2025	"Don't Worry Dear"	

== Theater ==
Year	Title	Role	Ref.
2006	The Miracle Worker	Anne Sullivan	
2022–2023	Misery	Annie Wilkes	
2023	The Dressing Room	C	

== Discography ==
=== Soundtrack appearances ===
List of soundtrack appearances, showing year released, and name of the album
Title	Year	Album
"Don't Worry Dear (걱정말아요 그대)" (Stray Dogs featuring Lee Il-hwa)	2025	Reply 1988 10th Anniversary OST

== Awards and nominations ==
Name of the award ceremony, year presented, category, nominee of the award, and the result of the nomination
Award ceremony	Year	Category	Nominee / Work	Result	Ref.
KBS Drama Awards	2017	Best Supporting Actress	Good Manager, Witch's Court	Won	
KBS Drama Awards	2018	Excellence Award, Actress in a One Act/Special/Short Drama	Mother's Third Marriage	Won	
KBS Drama Awards	2021	Best Supporting Actress	Young Lady and Gentleman	Nominated	
Korea Drama Awards	2017	Excellence Award, Actress	Good Manager	Won	
MBC Drama Awards	2018	Top Excellence Award, Actress in a Soap Opera	Secrets and Lies	Nominated	
Seoul International Drama Awards	2021	Outstanding Korean Actress	Kairos	Nominated	
