= Princess Suchun =

- Princess of Goryeo
- Died: 1345; Goryeo
- Spouse: Heo Jong (before 1345)
- House: House of Wang (by birth); Yangcheon Heo (by marriage)
- Father: Chungseon of Goryeo

Korean name
- Hangul: 수춘옹주
- Hanja: 壽春翁主
- RR: Suchun ongju
- MR: Such'un ongju

Princess Suchun (died 1345) was the only daughter of King Chungseon of Goryeo. Since her mother was unknown, it was speculated that she was a maid/low-born woman.

When the King stayed in Yeongyeong, Yuan dynasty, he summoned Heo-Jong (허종) and gave him a generous gift by saying,

"I only have one daughter and since you have been together for 27 years, there are no useless words, this is why I love you again and again."
"나에게는 딸이 하나밖에 없는데 그대가 27년이나 함께 하면서 쓸데없는 말이 생기지 않으니, 이것이 내가 그대를 거듭 사랑하는 까닭이다."

— 《Goryeosa》Volume 105〈Biographies〉Volume 18 - Jesin - Heogong - Heojong

They later married but childless and in early 1345, she died and as her husband, Heo was said to be very sad about this and died while mourned her affairs.

== In popular culture ==
- Portrayed by Lee Il-hwa in the 2005 MBC Mini series Jikji.
