= Hearts and Hari =

2020 South Korean web series

- Promotional poster
- Hangul: 연애공식 구하리
- RR: Yeonaegongsik guhari
- MR: Yŏnaegongsik kuhari
- Genre: Drama; Horror; Romance
- Based on: The Haunted House
- Screenplay by: Choi Eun-bi
- Directed by: Yul Kim; Wooyeol Lee
- Starring: Park Ji-ye; Hyunjun
- Country of origin: South Korea
- Original language: Korean
- No. of episodes: 12

Production
- Executive producers: Son Yoon-jung; Kim Jin-ah
- Producer: Kim Yong-man
- Running time: 7–11 minutes
- Production company: CJ ENM

Original release
- Network: Tooniverse
- Release: January 17 – March 21, 2020

Related
- The Haunted House (TV series); Remember, Hari

Hearts and Hari (Korean: 연애공식 구하리) is a South Korean web series, starring Park Ji-ye and Hyunjun. It is a sequel to the 2018 web drama Remember, Hari. A video game adaptation titled Ghost Signal (고스트 시그널) on December 12, 2019, on Android and January 9, 2020, on iOS, published by Rhaon. And later aired on Tooniverse and YouTube on January 17 to March 21, 2020, every Friday at 5:00 and 9:00 (KST). (Note: The last 12 episode is aired on Saturday.)

== Cast ==
- Park Ji-ye as Goo Ha-ri
- Hyunjun as Choi Kang-lim
- Bae Gyu-ri as Shin Chae-rin
- Kim Bum-soo as Jang Do-yoon
- Song Ji-hyun as Im Byeol
- Dew Se-ul as Choi Eun-seo
- Yoo Byeong-hoon as Ha Min-hyun
- Lee Soo-ha as Lee Min-ah

== Ghost Signal ==
Ghost Signal (Korean: 고스트 시그널) is a dating sim developed and published by Rhaon, the game was released on December 12, 2019, on Android and January 9, 2020, on iOS. The player controls Hari with an exclusive story content.
