= Park Joon-hyung =

- Hangul: 박준형
- RR: Bak Junhyeong
- MR: Pak Chunhyŏng

Park Joon-hyung (Korean: 박준형) is a Korean name consisting of the family name Park and the given name Joon-hyung, and may also refer to:

- Joon Park (born 1969), South Korean-based American singer
- Park Joon-hyung (comedian) (born 1975), South Korean comedian
- Park Jun-Heong (born 1993), South Korean football player
