= List of programs broadcast by OCN =

This is a list of programmes broadcast on South Korean cable television channel OCN.

== Dramas ==
=== Monday–Tuesday ===
==== OCN Pick ====
OCN Pick was the name used while My Secret Romance was airing, however, it was later changed to OCN Romance Series.

- My Secret Romance (애타는 로맨스; 2017)
- Meloholic (멜로홀릭; 2017)
- My First Love (애간장; 2018)
- Short (쇼트; 2018)
- Evergreen (그남자 오수; 2018)

=== Wednesday–Thursday ===
==== OCN Original ====
- The Guest (손: The Guest; 2018)
- Quiz of God: Reboot (신의 퀴즈5; 2018)
- Possessed (빙의; 2019)
- Save Me 2 (구해줘2; 2019)
- Class of Lies (미스터 기간제; 2019)
- The Running Mates: Human Rights (달리는 조사관; 2019)

=== Saturday–Sunday ===
==== OCN Original ====
- Coma (코마; 2006)
- Someday (썸데이; 2006)
- Quiz of God (신의 퀴즈; 2010)
- Yaksha (야차; 2010–2011)
- Quiz of God Season 2 (신의 퀴즈 2; 2011)
- Vampire Prosecutor (뱀파이어 검사; 2011)
- Special Affairs Team TEN (특수사건전담반 TEN; 2011–2012)
- Hero (히어로; 2012)
- Quiz of God Season 3 (신의 퀴즈 3; 2012)
- Vampire Prosecutor Season 2 (뱀파이어 검사 2; 2012)
- The Virus (더 바이러스; 2013)
- Special Affairs Team TEN Season 2 (특수사건전담반 TEN 2; 2013)
- Cheo Yong (귀신보는 형사, 처용; 2014)
- Quiz of God Season 4 (신의 퀴즈 4; 2014)
- Reset (리셋; 2014)
- Bad Guys (나쁜 녀석들; 2014)
- Dr. Frost (닥터 프로스트; 2014–2015)
- The Missing (실종느와르; 2015)
- My Beautiful Bride (아름다운 나의 신부; 2015)
- Cheo Yong Season 2 (귀신보는 형사, 처용 2; 2015)
- Local Hero (동네의 영웅; 2016)
- The Vampire Detective (뱀파이어 탐정; 2016)
- Squad 38 (38사기동대; 2016)
- Voice (보이스; 2017)
- Tunnel (터널; 2017)
- Duel (듀얼; 2017)
- Save Me (구해줘; 2017)
- Black (블랙; 2017)
- Bad Guys 2 (나쁜 녀석들: 악의 도시; 2017–2018)
- Children of a Lesser God (작은 신의 아이들; 2018)
- Mistress (미스트리스; 2018)
- Life on Mars (라이프 온 마스; 2018)
- Voice 2 (보이스2; 2018)
- Player (플레이어; 2018)
- Priest (프리스트; 2018–2019)
- Kill It (킬잇; 2019)
- Voice 3 (보이스3; 2019)
- Watcher (왓쳐; 2019)
- The Lies Within (모두의 거짓말; 2019)
- Tell Me What You Saw (본대로 말하라; 2020)
- Rugal (루갈; 2020)
- Train (트레인; 2020)
- Missing: The Other Side (미씽: 그들이 있었다; 2020)
- The Uncanny Counter (경이로운 소문; 2020)
- Times (타임즈; 2021)
- Chimera (키마이라; 2021)
- A Superior Day (우월한 하루; 2022)

==== OCN Dramatic Cinema ====
A project which combines film and drama formats.

- Trap (트랩; 2019)
- Strangers from Hell (타인은 지옥이다; 2019)
- Team Bulldog: Off-Duty Investigation (번외수사; 2020)
- Search (써치; 2020)
- Dark Hole (다크홀; 2021)

== OCN TV Movie series ==
- Same Bed, Different Dreams (동상이몽; November 28, 2004 – January 2, 2005) - 6 omnibus episodes
- Family Scandal (가족연애사; December 9 – 30, 2005)
- Family Scandal 2 (가족연애사 2; January 5 – 26, 2007)
- Kid Gang (키드갱; May 18 – August 9, 2007)
- Temptation of Eve (이브의 유혹; August 24 – September 14, 2007) - 4 omnibus episodes
- Company Love (직장연애사; November 9 – 30, 2007)
- Medical Gibang Cinema (메디컬 기방 영화관; November 20, 2007 – January 22, 2008)
- Children's Series (애시리즈; December 10 – 24, 2007) - 3 omnibus episodes
- The Tales of Nights (천일야화; December 14, 2007 – January 25, 2008) - 8 omnibus episodes
- Samin Samsaek (삼인삼색; January 17 – 31, 2008)
- The Art of Seduction (유혹의 기술; March 28 – April 18, 2008)
- Comic Battle - Director Jang vs Director Kim (코믹배틀 - 장감독 vs 김감독; May 9, 2008) - 1 episode
- Don't Ask Me About the Past (과거를 묻지 마세요; May 17 – June 8, 2008)
- Kyungsung Theater's Back Room (경성 기방 영화관; May 17 – June 14, 2008) - 10 omnibus episodes
- My Lady Boss, My Hero (여사부일체; September 19 – November 7, 2008)
- The Tales of Nights 2 (천일야화 2; October 12 – November 4, 2008)
- An Erotic Actor Murder Case (에로배우 살인사건; November 14 – 21, 2008) - 2 omnibus episodes
- Love is Delicious (사랑은 맛있다; December 18, 2008) - 1 episode
- Korean Mystery Detective Jung Yak Yong (조선추리활극 정약용; November 27, 2009 – January 15, 2010)
- Sidus FNH (싸이더스FNH; December 7, 2013 – April 17, 2014)
