= Park Mi-sun =

South Korean comedian and TV host (born 1967)

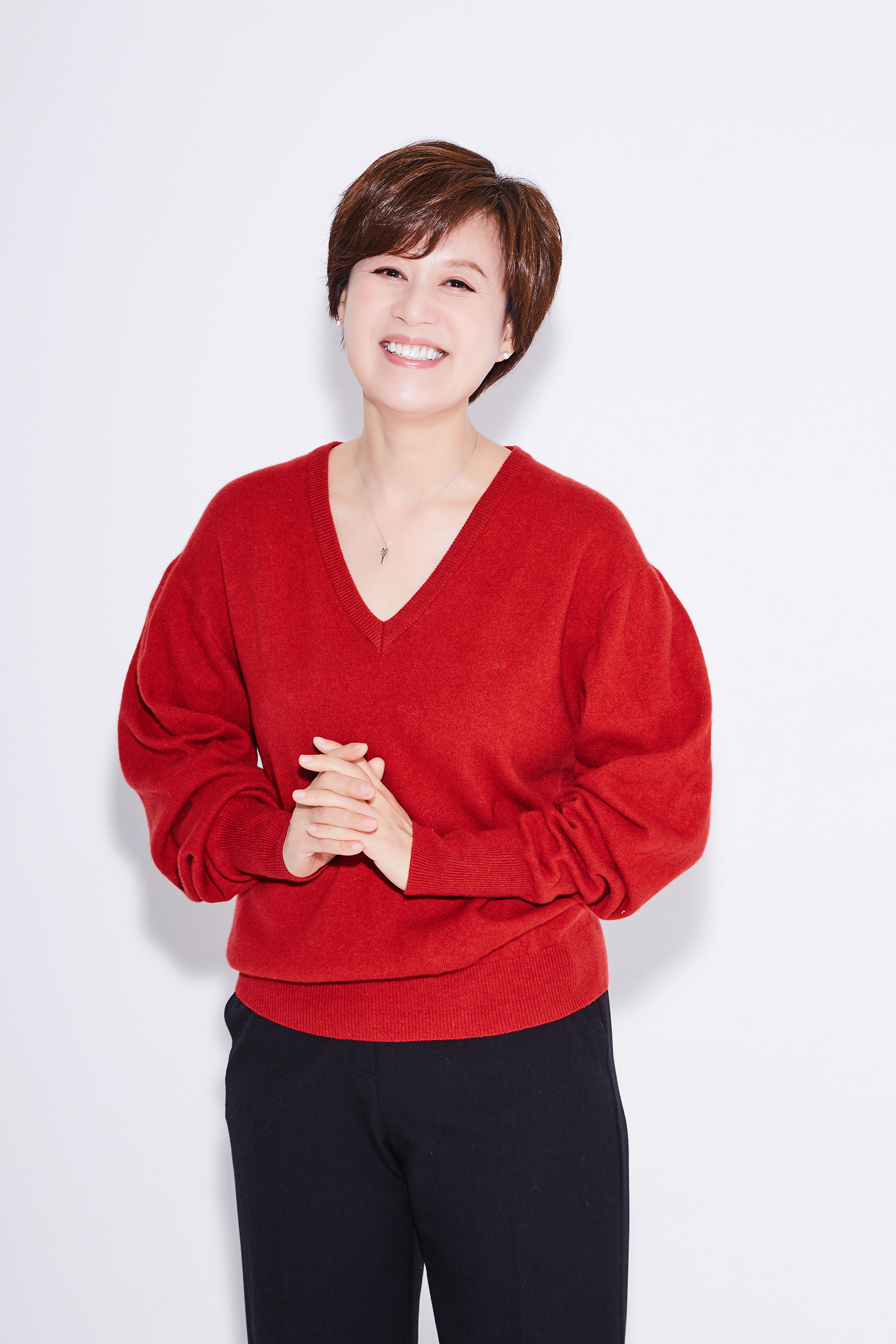
- Park in 2015
- Born: March 10, 1967 (age 59); Bogwang-dong, Yongsan District, Seoul, South Korea
- Education: Hanyang University
- Occupations: Comedian; TV host; actress
- Years active: 1987–present
- Agents: New-Able Entertainment; Cube Entertainment
- Spouse: Lee Bong-won (m. 1993)
- Children: 2

Korean name
- Hangul: 박미선
- Hanja: 朴美善
- RR: Bak Miseon
- MR: Pak Misŏn

Park Mi-sun (Korean: 박미선; born March 10, 1967) is a South Korean comedian and TV host of variety shows, notably Quiz to Change the World, Happy Together - Season 3, and We Got Married. In 1988, She made her official debut with a gold prize in the 2nd MBC TV Gag Contest. In October 1991, She moved to SBS when SBS was launched. She married Lee Bong-won, who moved to SBS at the same time. She expanded her field of activity to KBS after she declared her freelance in September 1994. She also starred in the sitcoms Soonpoong Clinic, Hilarious Housewives, and All My Love.

== Personal life ==
Park Mi-sun graduated from Hanyang University in 1985 with a bachelor's degree in Theater and Film.

She is married to fellow comedian Lee Bong-won. They have two children, son Lee Sang-yeob and daughter Lee Yu-ri.

== Filmography ==
=== Television shows ===
- Attack on Sisters (2022); with Jang Young-ran
- Golf Battle: Birdie Buddies (2022–2023); Narrator (Season 4–5)
- Avatar Singer (2022)
- Taste of Travel (2022)
- High School Daddy (2022–2023); Season 1–3
- Fan Heart Contest (2022)
- Mask Debate (2022)
- Teacher of Narat (2021–2022)
- Chosun Panstar (2021)
- MBC is Back (2021)
- Exercise Restaurant (2021–present)
- Steve JOBson ([2021)
- Misun: Impossible (2020–present)
- Don't be the First One! (2020–present)
- Modern K-Pop History, Bangjajeon (2014)
- Whale Wars (2014)
- Hey Fox (2014)
- Mamma Mia (2013–2014)
- Daechan Life (2013–2014)
- Shinmungo (2013)
- Bonanza Show Bang Bang Bang (2013)
- Blind Test Show 180° (2013)
- How's Your Husband? (2012)
- Star King (2012)
- The Great Birth - Season 2 (2012)
- Encore, Rebellion of the Tone-deaf (2011–2012)
- Even If It's Hateful, Once Again (2011–2012)
- We Got Married (2011–2017)
- Comedy Star (2010)
- Kind Mi-sun (2010)
- Intimate Note - Season 3 (2009–2010)
- Happy Together - Season 3 (2008–2015)
- Quiz to Change the World (2008–2012)
- Cheerful Hero (2008)
- True or False (2008)
- Sponge 2.0 (2007–2008)
- Bad Housewife (2007)
- Love in Asia (2007–2008)
- Let's Try to Live Well (2006–2007)
- Talk Talk Talk at 2 p.m. (2006–2007)
- Capture the Moment, How Is That Possible (2006–2008)
- Economic Vitamin (2006–2007)
- 대발견 IQ (2005)
- Couple's Diary (2005)
- What An Amazing World (2002–2009)
- Gag Concert (2002)
- 발견천하 Eureka (2002)
- Man in Crisis (2002)
- Happy TV (2000)
- Studio of Love (1999)
- Current Affairs Comedy File (1999)
- Video ActionQ (1998)
- Show! Missy Republic (1995)
- TV Talk (1995)
- The Incredible People (1995)
- Comedy Observatory (1991)
- A Good Laugh at Saturday 7 p.m. (1991)
- Youth March (1988)

=== Television series ===
- To. Jenny (2018)
- Sweet Revenge (2017)
- What Is Mom? (2012)
- The Greatest Love (2011) - cameo
- All My Love for You (2010)
- Hilarious Housewives (2009)
- Golden Bride (2007)
- Please Come Back, Soon-ae (2006)
- Oolla Boolla Blue-jjang (2004)
- Soonpoong Clinic (1998–2000)

=== Films ===
- Tone-deaf Clinic (2012)
- Fortune Salon (2009)
- Boy Goes to Heaven (2005) - cameo
- There We Were (2004)
- Two Wacky Heroes (1990)
- The Winter of the Kiwi (1987) - extra
- Potato (1987)

=== Radio programs ===
- Lee Bong-won and Park Mi-sun's Wa Wa Show (2010)
- Lee Bong-won and Park Mi-sun's Our House Radio (2008–2009)
- Kim Heung-gook and Park Mi-sun's Korean Special Show (2003)
- Jeon Yu-seong and Park Mi-sun's Radio Special Operation (1997)
- Kim Heung-gook and Park Mi-sun's Radio Special Operation (1997)

== Awards ==
- 2013 KBS Entertainment Awards: Top Excellence Award, Female Entertainer in a Variety Show (Mamma Mia, Happy Together - Season 3)
- 2011 23rd Korean PD Awards: Best Performer, TV Host category
- 2011 MBC Entertainment Awards: Top Excellence Award, Female Entertainer in a Variety Show (Quiz to Change the World)
- 2010 MBC Entertainment Awards: Top Excellence Award, MC category (Quiz to Change the World)
- 2009 MBC Entertainment Awards: Top Excellence Award, Actress in a Sitcom or Comedy (Tae-hee, Hye-kyo, Ji-hyun)
- 2009 KBS Entertainment Awards: Top Excellence Award, Female Entertainer in a Variety Show (Comedy Star, Happy Together - Season 3)
- 2009 45th Baeksang Arts Awards: Best Female Variety Performer (Sunday Night)
- 2008 MBC Entertainment Awards: Top Excellence Award, Female Entertainer in a Variety Show
- 2007 9th KBS Right Language Awards: Recipient
- 2005 12th Korean Entertainment Arts Awards: Best Radio Host
- 2004 SBS Drama Awards: Special Award for Radio (Korean Special Show)
- 2000 36th Baeksang Arts Awards: Best Female Comedian (Soonpoong Clinic)
- 1999 MBC Drama Awards: Top Excellence Award in Radio
- 1996 MBC Drama Awards: Excellence Award in Radio
- 1988 MBC Drama Awards: Best Newcomer in Comedy
- 1988 2nd MBC Gag Contest: Gold Medal
