= Jung Kyung-ho (actor, born 1972) =

South Korean actor

- Born: March 17, 1972 (age 54); South Korea
- Occupation: Actor
- Years active: 2001–present
- Agent: Doremi Entertainment

Korean name
- Hangul: 정경호
- RR: Jeong Gyeongho
- MR: Chŏng Kyŏngho

Jung Kyung-ho (born March 17, 1972) is a South Korean actor. He starred in film such as R2B: Return to Base (2012) and The Piper (2015).

== Filmography ==
=== Film ===
Year	Title	Role
2004	R-Point	Corporal Lee Jae-pil
2008	Once Upon a Time in Seoul	Mouse
2009	The Executioner	Jang
2010	Sooni, Where are You?	Heukssari
2010	On the Pitch	Jook Kuenchi
2010	Norwegian Woods	Chang wook
2010	Living Like A Beaten Dog	
2011	Jungle Fish 2– Theater	Min Chanki
2011	Funny Neighbors	Yang Insoo
2012	R2B: Return to Base	Captain Jo Tae-bong
2012	Happy Hotel	
2015	The Piper	Chul-soo's father
2016	Hiya	Park Dong-suk
2022	Lovely Voice: The Beginning	music Film

=== Television series ===
Year	Title	Role
2010	Golden House	Sang-geun
2010	The Third Activity By Mrs. Kwang Ja Kim	Jeong Kyungho
2010	Jungle Fish 2	Min Chanki
2011	The Duo	Kkul-tteok
2011	Heartstrings	Goo Jung-eun
2012	Ice Adonis	Park Chang-do
2013	Wonderful Mama	Sasa Kim
2014	Dr. Frost	Jeong Min-Woo
2015	Yong-pal	Doocheul's friend
2016	Marrying My Daughter Twice	Kang Woo-sik
2017	Good Manager	man blackmailing Kim Sung-ryong (Guest)

=== Musical ===
Year	Title	Role
2010–11	College of Laugh	
2014	A Story of an Old Thief	

=== Variety show ===
Year	Title	Notes
2009	Fun TV Roller Coaster 1	
2012	Roller Coaster 2	
