= Jungle Fish 2 =

2010 South Korean television series

- Promotional poster
- Hangul: 정글피쉬 2
- RR: Jeonggeulpiswi 2
- MR: Chŏnggŭlp'ishwi 2
- Genre: Teen drama
- Based on: Jungle Fish
- Written by: Seo Jae-won; Kim Kyung-min; Im Chae-joon
- Directed by: Kim Jung-hwan; Min Doo Shik
- Starring: Hong Jong-hyun; Park Ji-yeon
- Country of origin: South Korea
- Original language: Korean
- No. of episodes: 8

Production
- Executive producer: Kim Gwang-pil
- Producer: Kim Jeong-hwan
- Production locations: Seoul, South Korea

Original release
- Network: KBS2
- Release: November 4 – December 30, 2010

Jungle Fish 2 (Korean: 정글피쉬 2) is a 2010 South Korean youth television series starring Hong Jong-hyun and Park Ji-Yeon, Lee Joon, Han Ji-woo, Shin So-yu and Kim Bo-ra. It is based on the teen drama Jungle Fish that aired in 2008. The series ran on KBS2 from 4 November to 30 December 2010.

An audition was held in July 2010 to recruit the actors, more than 1,100 teenagers applied for the roles. The show was a commercial success scoring higher ratings than its prequel; and was well received by both teenagers and critics. It is also one of KBS's most-watched series online of all time.

The series was edited into a theatrical feature film released on March 3, 2011.

== Summary ==
Hyo-ahn, the ace of Gahwa high school, apparently committed suicide by jumping off a five-story building. Ho-soo, who had broken off their relationship the day before, wants to know why. Rumors surface over SNS messaging that Hyo-Ahn's back story is not as innocent as it seems. Ho-soo works with Hyo-ahn's classmates that have known her since elementary school.

The series is similar to the original Jungle Fish TV special in that it deals with the subject of teenage hardships and academic pressures.

== Cast ==
=== Main ===
- Hong Jong-hyun as Min Ho-soo
- Park Ji-yeon as Seo Yool
- Lee Joon as Ahn Ba-woo
- Han Ji-woo as Baek Hyo-Ahn
- Shin So-Yul as Lee Ra-Yi
- Kim Bo-ra as Yoon Gong-ji

=== Supporting ===
- Choi Myung-kyung as Lee Sang-yong
- Lee Mi-so as Yoo Yeo-jin
- Yoon Hee-seok as Jung In-woo
- Kim Dong-beom as Bae Tae-rang
- Ryu Hyo-young as Jeong Yoo-mi
- Go Kyung-pyo as Bong Il-tae
- Jung Kyung-ho as Min Chan-ki
- Choi Woo-hyeok as Speaker
- Shin Seo-hyun as Hong Eun-ja
- Kim So-young as Han Jae-eun
- Kim Jae-woo as Shin Won-tak
- Nam Hyun-joo as Ho-soo's mother
- Jung Man-sik as Ba-woo's father
- Jeon So-min as Ba-woo's date
- Lee Il-hwa as Ra-yi's mother
- Jo Jae-yoon as P.E. Teacher
- Song Eun-jin as Teacher

== Original soundtrack ==
Jungle Fish 2 - OST

Soundtrack album by Various Artists
- Released: November 4, 2010
- Genres: Ballad, Rock/Metal, Dance, Folk/Blues
- Length: 32:29
- Language: Korean
- Label: Pony Canyon Korea

Album Tracklist
No.	Title	Artist	Length
1.	"Only Once" (단 한번만)	Bang Min-ah	4:08
2.	"No Matter What" (누가 뭐래도)	Supernova	3:42
3.	"More & More" (점점)	Park Ji-yeon	3:48
4.	"Sleepless Dream" (잠들지 않는 꿈)	Taru	3:09
5.	"Sad Feeling" (슬픈 예감)	여희	4:05
6.	"Tomorrow"	Yoo Seung-chan	3:27
7.	"I Can Do It"	Taru	3:33
8.	"I love You" (널 사랑하나 봐)	Xena	3:35
9.	"Knockin' On Heaven's Door"	Taru	3:03
Total length:			32:29

== Ratings ==
Ep.	Original broadcast date	Average audience share	
Ep.	Original broadcast date	TNmS	AGB Nielsen
Ep.	Original broadcast date	Nationwide	
1	November 4, 2010	4.9%	4.1% (46th)
2	November 11, 2010	4.7%	4.4% (41th)
3	November 25, 2010	4.8%	5% (40th)
4	December 2, 2010	4.6%	3.8% (NR)
5	December 9, 2010	3.8%	4.3% (50th)
6	December 16, 2010	4.3%	3.7% (NR)
7	December 23, 2010	4.3%	4.6% (40th)
8	December 30, 2010	4.3%	4% (NR)

== Awards and nominations ==
Year	Ceremony	Award	Recipient	Result	Ref.
2011	The 13th Seoul International Youth Film Festival	The discovery of Korean films growth	Jungle Fish 2 - The Movie	Nominated	

== Media release ==
The series was released as a DVD in Japan in May and in Singapore in June 2011.

KBS's official YouTube channel KBS World released the full series on YouTube on 2015. It has amassed over 700,000 views since; making one of the channel's most watched dramas.

== International broadcast ==
Premiere	Network	Country
May 4, 2011	KBS World	Various
October 27, 2012	Star TV	Singapore
July 6, 2019	KBS Japan	Japan
