= Don't be the First One! =

South Korean TV program

- Also known as: Number 1
- Genre: Reality television Talk show
- Written by: Hwang Sun-young; Jeong Yoon-hee; Choi Mi-yeon; Kim Seong-won; Park Joo-kyung; Seong Mi-jung; Kim Hyun-joo; Ahn A-reum; Lee Shin-young; Lee Young-kyung
- Directed by: Yoo Ki-hwn; Kim Na-hyun; Park Hyun-jung; Hwang Je-min; Yoo Su-jin; Kim Yun-sung; Lee Ji-eun; Kim Hee-dong; Sung Yeon-ho; Hwang Ye-seong; Kim Jihye; Park Yeon-gyo; Park Koo-seul; Kim Min-hyung
- Presented by: Park Mi-Sun; Jang Do-youn
- Country of origin: South Korea
- Original language: Korean

Production
- Running time: 135 minutes

Original release
- Network: JTBC
- Release: May 20, 2020 – August 21, 2021

Don't be the First One! (Korean: 1호가 될 순 없어), also known as Number 1, is a South Korean television entertainment program distributed by JTBC.

== Synopsis ==
According to a research in 2019, 11,800 couples divorced in South Korea, but none came from comedian couples. This reality show analyses what maintained the comedian couples' marriages.

== Format ==
The show is filmed with hidden cameras set up in each of the celebrities' actual home. In each episode, as the show moves from one family to the next, a brief analysis by the starring guests is given to in between segment of the episode.

== Presenters ==
=== Hosts ===
- Park Mi-sun Ep. 1 – present
- Jang Do-yeon Ep. 1 – present

==== Current cast ====
- Choi Yang-rak – Paeng Hyun-sook Ep. 1 – present
- Kang Jae-joon – Lee Eun-hyeong Ep. 1 – present
- Park Joon-hyung – Kim Ji-hye Ep. 1 – present
- Kim Hak-rae – Im Mi-sook Ep. 17 – present
- Yoon Hyung-bin – Jung Kyung-mi Ep. 20 – present
- Kim Won-hyo – Shim Jin-hwa Ep. 25 – present

== Ratings ==
In the ratings below, the highest rating for the show will be in red, and the lowest rating for the show will be in blue each year.

=== List of ratings in 2020 (episode 1- ) ===
Ep. #	Broadcast date	Average audience share
Ep. #	Broadcast date	Nationwide
1	May 20	3.221%
2	May 27	3.081%
3	June 3	2.917%
4	June 10	1.977%
5	June 17	2.118%
6	June 24	2.234%
7	July 1	2.364%
8	July 8	2.423%
9	July 15	2.109%
10	July 22	2.296%
11	July 29	2.167%
12	August 5	2.074%
13	August 16	3.951%
14	August 23	3.882%
15	August 30	5.527%
16	September 6	3.773%
17	September 13	4.036%
18	September 20	4.121%
19	September 27	3.610%
20	October 11	4.372%
21	October 18	3.578%
22	October 25	4.121%
23	November 1	3.830%
24	November 8	3.482%
25	November 15	4.121%
26	November 22	3.908%
27	November 29	%
