= Park Ji-ye =

South Korean actress (born 1995)

- Born: November 15, 1995 (age 29); Gangnam District, Cheongdam-dong, South Korea
- Education: Dongduk Women's University; Kaywon High School of Arts
- Occupation: Actress
- Years active: 2014–present
- Agent: Film It Su Da

Korean name
- Hangul: 박지예
- RR: Bak Jiye
- MR: Pak Chiye

Park Ji-ye (Korean: 박지예; born November 15, 1995) is a South Korean actress. She is best known for her role as Hari Koo in Tooniverse's web drama of Remember, Hari (2018) and Hearts and Hari (2020) from The Haunted House animated franchise.

== Filmography ==
=== Television series ===
Year	Title	Role	Ref.
2017	Hello, My Twenties!		
2018	Mistress	Se-yeon's cafe	
2020	Do You Like Brahms?	Flute	
2021	Secret Royal Inspector & Joy	Kkot-dan-i	

=== Web series ===
Year	Title	Role	Ref.
2018	Remember, Hari	Hari Koo	
2019	Anniversary Anyway	Kim Wan	
2020	Hearts and Hari	Hari Koo	
2020	My YouTube Diary	Hari Koo	
2021	Move to Heaven	Bank Employee	
2021	Dr. Brain	Mi-na	
