= Doremi Entertainment =

- Doremi Entertainment logo
- Native name: 도레미엔터테인먼트
- Formerly: DRM Media
- Company type: Small and medium-sized enterprises
- Genre: Korean drama
- Founded: April 6, 2006 (as Dandi Entertainment)
- Founder: Park Nam-sung
- Headquarters: 659, Gonghang-dong, Gangseo District, Seoul, South Korea
- Key people: Park Nam-sung (founder and CEO)
- Products: TV series; OST
- Services: TV series production; Artist management; OST making
- Website: doremient.co.kr

Doremi Entertainment (Korean: 도레미엔터테인먼트) is a South Korean artist management, TV series original sound track making, and Korean drama production company.

== List of works ==
=== TV series ===
| Year | Title | Network | Note | Ref. |
|---|---|---|---|---|
| 2006 | Please Come Back, Soon-ae | SBS TV | | |
| 2007 | Kimchi Cheese Smile | MBC TV | | |
| 2007 | Get Karl! Oh Soo-jung | SBS TV | with SEGO Entertainment | |
| 2007 | Cruel Love | KBS2 | with Golden Thumb Pictures | |
| 2009 | Queen of Housewives | MBC TV | | |
| 2013 | Thunder Store | Tooniverse | | |
| 2013 | Cruel City | JTBC | | |
| 2013 | I Can Hear Your Voice | SBS TV | with Kim Jong-hak Production | |
| 2013 | Your Neighbor's Wife | JTBC | with Drama House | |
| 2014 | Some Guys, Some Girls | Daum TV Pot; YouTube | web series; not to be confused with the 2015 SBS variety show | |
| 2015 | Beating Again | jTBC | 2nd collaboration with Kim Jong-hak Production | |
| 2015 | My Beautiful Bride | OCN | | |
| 2017 | Super Family 2017 | SBS TV | | |
| 2017 | Man Who Dies to Live | MBC TV | | |
| 2020 | Private Lives | jtbc | | |

=== TV series OST ===
| Year | Title | Note |
|---|---|---|
| 2007 | Cruel Love | |
| 2011 | Bravo, My Love! | |
| 2011 | Glory Jane | in collaboration with Kim Jong-hak Production |
| 2012 | I Do, I Do | in collaboration with Kim Jong-hak Production |
| 2012 | The King 2 Hearts | in collaboration with Kim Jong-hak Production |
| 2012 | Full House Take 2 | |
| 2012 | The King's Doctor | |
| 2013 | Cruel City | |
| 2013 | I Can Hear Your Voice | in collaboration with SBS Contents Hub |
| 2013 | Your Neighbor's Wife | in collaboration with Drama House and J Content Hub |
| 2014 | Big Man | in collaboration with Kim Jong-hak Production and KBS Media |
| 2014 | Some Guys, Some Girls | |
| 2014 | Healer | in collaboration with Kim Jong-hak Production |
| 2015 | Beating Again | in collaboration with Kim Jong-hak Production |
| 2015 | Beloved Eun-dong | in collaboration with Drama House and J Content Hub |
| 2015 | My Beautiful Bride | |
| 2016 | Flowers of the Prison | in collaboration with Kim Jong-hak Production |

== Managed artists ==
- Kwak Min-Seok
- Jung Kyung-ho
- Kang Sang-won
- Jang Won-hyuk
- Na Hyun-Joo
- Won Hyun-joon
- Park Hyun-woo
