= Remember, Hari =

2018 South Korean web series

- Korean promotional poster. From left to right: Park Ji-ye, Hyunjun
- Also known as: The Haunted House EX: The Haunted Memory
- Hangul: 신비아파트 외전: 기억, 하리
- RR: Sinbi apateu oejeon: gieok, Hari
- MR: Sinbi ap'at'ŭ oejŏn: kiŏk, Hari
- Genre: Drama; Horror; Romance
- Based on: The Haunted House
- Written by: Kim Jong-min
- Directed by: Ko Bong-soo; Park Yong-jin
- Starring: Park Ji-ye; Hyunjun; Jang So-jung; Jung Sung-young
- Country of origin: South Korea
- Original language: Korean
- No. of seasons: 2
- No. of episodes: 20

Production
- Running time: 11–18 minutes
- Production companies: CJ ENM; IN Culture & Contents (Inster Contents Group)

Original release
- Network: Tooniverse
- Release: August 2, 2018 – April 5, 2019

Related
- The Haunted House (TV series); Hearts and Hari

Remember, Hari (Korean: 신비아파트 외전: 기억, 하리) is a South Korean web series, starring Park Ji-ye and Hyunjun. Based on animated series, The Haunted House. It aired on cable network Tooniverse at 8:00 every Thursday and Friday from August 2 to September 7, 2018, in the first season. The second season aired on February 15 to April 5, 2019, at 8:00 every Friday.

A sequel titled Hearts and Hari (고스트 시그널) premiered on January 17, 2020. The series was streamed online on YouTube.

== Cast ==
=== Main ===
- Park Ji-ye as Goo Ha-ri
- Hyunjun as Choi Kang-lim
- Jang So-jung as Lee Ga-eun
- Jung Sung-young as Kim Hyun-woo

=== Supporting ===
- Lee Dong-gil as Park Joo-min
- Lee Hyo-na as Park Soo-yeon
- Jung Han-bit as Snow Lady
