= Erexion =

2006–2007 South Korean children's drama

- Also known as: SFX Drama Erexion
- Hangul: 이레자이온
- RR: Irejaion
- MR: Irejaion
- Genre: Children's drama
- Directed by: Park Chan-yool; Yu Min-hang
- Starring: Choi Woo-seok; Jang Ji-won; Lee Geon; Lee Ka-young; Cha Woo-jin; Jeong Se-in; Jeong Lee-ro; Lee Han-sol; Jeon-yeong; Ji Jun-seong
- Country of origin: South Korea
- Original language: Korean
- No. of episodes: 26

Production
- Running time: 17 minutes and 30 seconds

Original release
- Network: KBS2
- Release: November 24, 2006 – April 27, 2007

Erexion (Korean: SFX 드라마 이레자이온) is a South Korean children's tokusatsu drama that premiered on November 24, 2006. It was produced by Chungam Entertainment and aired on KBS 2. Its format is similar to the tokusatsu productions of Japan. The seven members are based upon the seven days of the Asian calendar (Sun, Moon, Fire, Water, Wood, Metal, Earth).

== Synopsis ==
On the distant planet Airon (아이런), there was a Crystal tower which held "the crystals," a powerful source of energy that kept the galaxy in balance. The evil Terra (테라), however, tried to gain control of it, and the brave general Kamo (카모) stopped him by destroying the tower. The crystals split into seven pieces and were scattered all over the Earth, and Terra became dormant due to an explosion that knocked him out. Thus Li (리 대사제), the high priestess of Airon — along with her bodyguard, Mok-gi, and six individuals from the past, present, and future — ventures off to Earth to find the seven pieces and restore balance . As the Universe Seven (천지 7인), Il-sung (일성), Wur-hwa (월화), Hwa-san (화산), Soo-shim (수심), Toh-ryuk (토력), Geum-gang (금강은), and Mok-gi (목기) fight against the treacherous Chu-yi (츄이) and the reawakened Terra, in order to prevent the crystals from falling into the wrong hands.

== Cast ==
- Choi Woo-seok as Il-seong
- Jang Ji-won as Wol-hwa
- Lee Geon as Hwa-san
- Lee Ka-young as Su-shim
- Cha Woo-jin as Mok-gi
- Jeong Se-in as Keum-kang
- Jeong Lee-ro as Do-ryeok
- Lee Han-sol as Te-ra
- Jeon-yeong
- Ji Jun-seong as Chu-yi

== Songs ==
Theme song
"Light" (빛) by Paran
Insert songs
"Invisible Force" (보이지 않는 힘) by Kim Kyo-min (김교민)
"We're in this together" (우리함께) by Kim Kyo-min (with Kwon Dae-hun, 권대훈)
