= Jungle Fish =

2008 South Korean television series

- Promotional poster
- Hangul: 정글피쉬
- RR: Jeonggeulpiswi
- MR: Chŏnggŭlp'ishwi
- Genre: Teen drama
- Written by: Seo Jae-won; Kim Kyung-min; Im Chae-joon
- Directed by: Choi Sung-bum
- Starring: Kim Soo-hyun; Park Bo-young
- Country of origin: South Korea
- Original language: Korean
- No. of episodes: 1

Production
- Executive producer: Kim Gwang-pil
- Producer: Kim Jeong-hwan
- Production locations: Seoul, South Korea
- Running time: 60 minutes

Original release
- Network: KBS2
- Release: May 5, 2008

Jungle Fish (Korean: 정글피쉬) is a 2008 South Korean youth television special starring Kim Soo-hyun and Park Bo-young. Based on a true story, the drama depicts the pressures placed on students to achieve and gain admission to prestigious colleges and universities. Also, it showcased new interactive blogging. The series marked Kim's first official lead role. It aired on KBS2 on 5 May 2008 at 19:20 (KST), and is available for worldwide streaming through KBS World's official YouTube channel.

The special recorded a viewership rating of 3.3%. It received critical acclaim for filming and editing, and acting by a cast of young performers winning numerous awards, including the Peabody Award. It became the KBS show with the most international awards in history.

It was given a theatrical screening on 23 September 2010 at the Lotte Cinema at Konkuk University. A television series, Jungle Fish 2, was created featuring a different cast, and aired in 2010 on KBS.

== Summary ==
The drama Jungle Fish, which means a fish that lived on the coast of Africa and fell into the jungle by a whirlwind, portrays the current youth (fish) who are struggling for the better future (beach) while suffering from the reality (jungle) of the entrance exam.

The story is about high school students around Han Jae-ta (Kim Soo-hyun) who share their concerns and problems through the blog. One day, an examination paper leak incident occurs at his school through special tutoring. The class leader leads Jae-ta and digs into the problem to confirm "Who is the protagonist of the incident?", and the incident is gradually amplified through Jae-ta's blog. Through this incident, Jae-ta and his friends are increasingly in conflict and skepticism about "the value of friendship and success."

== Cast ==
=== Main ===
- Kim Soo-hyun as Han Jae-ta

A high-school student, who has good photography skills and runs a blog about his daily life.

- Park Bo-young as Lee Eun-soo

Her mother wants her to enroll in a prestigious college. She unburdens her daily life problems through the blog.

=== Supporting ===
- Hwang Chan-sung as Park Young-sam

Jae-ta's friend who leads him to find out who stole the exam question papers.

- Jang Ki-bum as Han Dong-hee

Jae-ta's friend who comes in skepticism about the friendship with him after the incident.

- Cha Min-ji as Kang-sol

Eun-soo's good friend who refuses to talk with her after learning the truth.

- Seo Hye-jin as Na Mi-rae

Eun-soo's classmate who takes special classes with her and Dong-hee.

- Ryu Hyo-young as Jung Yoo-mi
- Kim C as Jae-ta's uncle
- Kim Dong-beom as speaker

== Awards ==
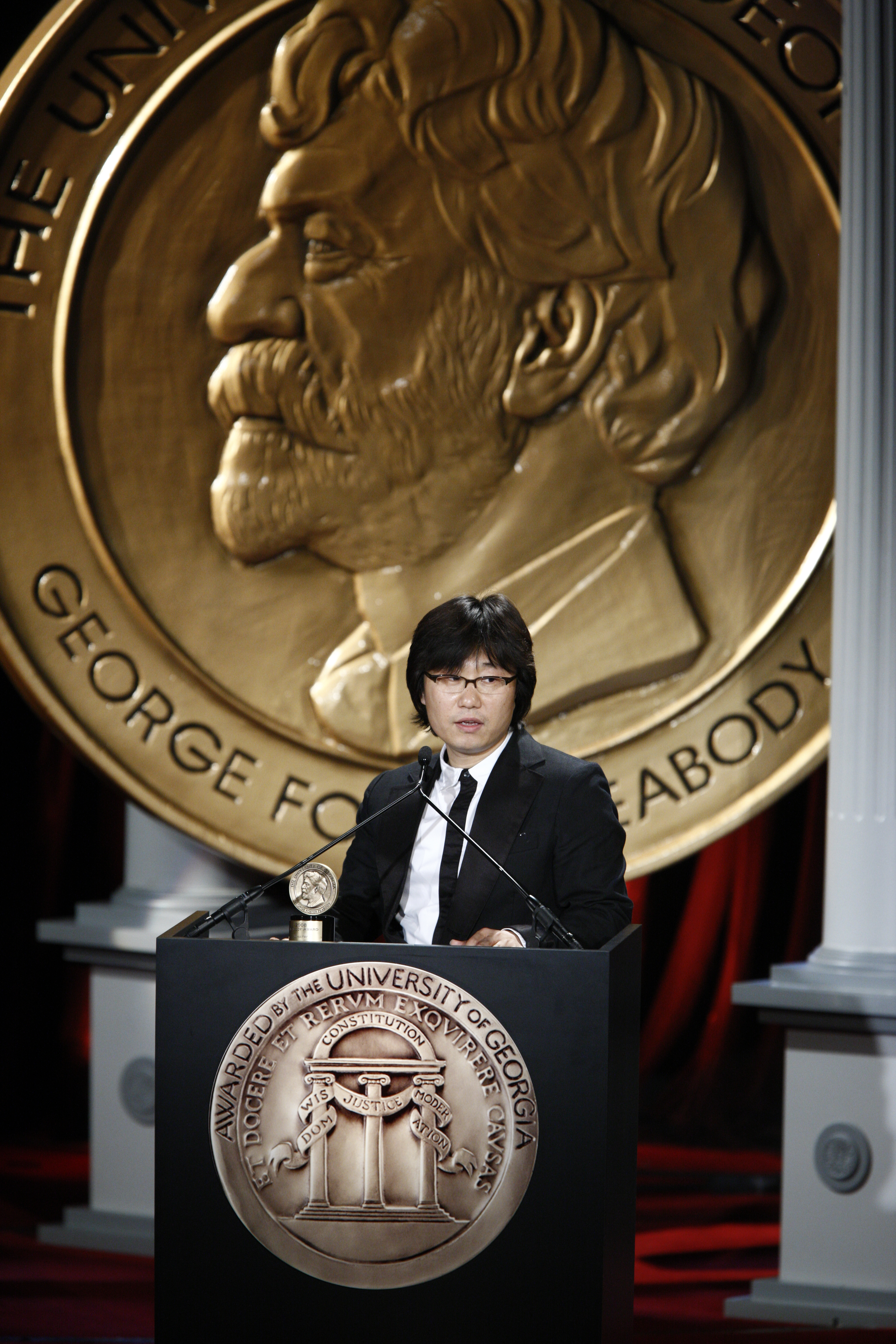
Kim Jeong-hwan at the 68th Annual Peabody Awards for Jungle Fish

Ceremony	Year	Award	Result	Ref.
Japan East Asia PD Forum	2008	Excellence Award	Won	
Asia-Pacific Broadcasting Union Awards	2008	Grand Prize - TV Youth	Won	
Seoul Drama Festival Awards	2008	Best Juvenile Series	Won	
Peabody Award	2009	Award Winner	Won	
