= Kim Dong-beom =

South Korean actor

- Born: January 26, 1991 (age 35); South Korea
- Occupation: Actor
- Years active: 2007–present

Korean name
- Hangul: 김동범
- RR: Gim Dongbeom
- MR: Kim Tongbŏm

Kim Dong-beom (born January 26, 1991) is a South Korean actor. Kim made his acting debut in 2007, and has appeared in mostly bit parts and supporting roles. His major roles have been in Jungle Fish 2 (2010) and Kong's Family (2013).

== Filmography ==
=== Film ===
Year	Title	Role
2008	Our School's E.T.	Je-dong
2009	4th Period Mystery	Do-il
2010	71: Into the Fire	Student soldier Jae-seon
2013	Kong's Family	Jang Young-deok
2015	Northern Limit Line	Kim Il-byung

=== Television series ===
Year	Title	Role	Network
2007	My Mom! Super Mom!		KBS2
2008	Jungle Fish	Speaker	KBS2
2009	Hilarious Housewives	Kim Dong-beom, Yoon Jong-shin's manager	MBC
2010	Jungle Fish 2	Bae Tae-rang	KBS2
2010	Pure Pumpkin Flower	Hyo-jae	SBS
2011	Real School!	Bad boy Kim Dong-beom	MBC Every 1
2011	Romance Town	Choi	KBS2
2011	KBS Drama Special "Human Casino"	Baek Ga-myeon	KBS2
2012	Ugly Miss Young-ae 10	Dong-beom	tvN
2012	Family	Bin Dae-chul	KBS2
