= Hilarious Housewives =

South Korean situation comedy

- Promotional poster
- Hangul: 태희혜교지현이
- RR: TaehuiHyegyoJihyeoni
- MR: T'aehŭiHyegyoChihyŏni
- Genre: Sitcom
- Written by: Kim Hyun-hee; Park Min-jung; Baek Ji-hyeon; Kwak Kyung-yoon; Han Sul-hee
- Directed by: Kwon Ik-jun; Jun Jin-su; Jung Chang-yeong; Lee Ji-seon
- Starring: Park Mi-sun; Jung Sun-kyung; Kim Hee-jung; Choi Eun-kyung; Hong Ji-min
- Country of origin: South Korea
- Original language: Korean
- No. of seasons: 1
- No. of episodes: 133

Production
- Running time: 30 minutes

Original release
- Network: MBC
- Release: March 2 – September 4, 2009

Hilarious Housewives (Korean: 태희혜교지현이) was a South Korean situation comedy revolving around the lives of middle-class housewives and their families with lighthearted stories. It aired on MBC from March 2, 2009, to September 4, 2009, on Mondays to Fridays at 19:45 for 133 episodes.

== Plot ==
Jung Sun-kyung owns a bakery. One day, her husband asks for a divorce and then disappears. Sun-kyung finds herself thrust into the role of running her husband's talent agency as well as the bakery. She faces multiple challenges in her new job, but her neighbours Mi-sun, Hee-jung, and Ji-min help her overcome them. The show depicts the lives of five housewives, with Mi-sun as the main character.

== Cast and characters ==
=== Housewives ===
- Park Mi-sun as Park Mi-sun

She's the neighbourhood wives' club president and runs a real estate agency. She's older than the other housewives and keeps tabs on everyone. Thus, she practically knows everything that goes on in the neighbourhood.

- Jung Sun-kyung as Jung Sun-kyung

She owns a bakery but one day her husband goes missing and she finds herself running her husband's talent agency. She is kind and caring, although not the most intelligent.

- Kim Hee-jung as Kim Hee-jung

She's a full-time housewife who obsesses about providing the best education for her daughter. She's full of envy and curious about the lives of her neighbours. She also likes to gossip about people behind their backs.

- Choi Eun-kyung as Choi Eun-kyung

She's rich and has everything that a housewife desires. Her son is a straight-A student and her husband is a high-earner, making her the envy of all the housewives in the neighbourhood.

- Hong Ji-min as Hong Ji-min

A writer for a daily radio show. Her husband Kim Gook-jin lost his job but she tries her best to support her family as the breadwinner. She likes to get involved in matters where she feels like she can make a difference.

=== Family ===
- Sunwoo Yong-nyeo as Sunwoo Yong-nyeo

Jung Sun-kyung's mother-in-law. A typical Korean mother-in-law.

- Shim Eun-kyung as Shim Eun-kyung

Jung Sun-kyung's daughter who is in middle school

- Lee Se-chang as Han Sung-pil

Kim Hee-jung's husband. A neighbourhood hottie with a good sense of humour, a troublemaker you can't hate.

- Han Bo-bae as Han Bo-bae

Kim Hee-jung's daughter. She is also Shim Eun-kyung's best friend

- Lee Tae-min as Jun-su

Choi Eun-kyung's son. He is a good student, has a good personality, and is filial. In a word, he is a 'mother's son'.

- Lee Jang-woo as Choi Jang-woo

Aspiring comedian and Choi Eun-kyung's younger brother

- Kim Gook-jin as Kim Gook-jin

Hong Ji-min's husband, patriarchal and authoritarian. Strong-willed and timid. Becomes a full-time housewife after losing his job.

- Jung Se-in as Kim Young-chul

Hong Ji-min's son. Shim Eun-kyung's friend, a troublemaker who doesn't study

=== Others ===
- Park Sung-woong as Park Sung-woong

A friend of Sun-kyung's husband, Shim Hak-gyu. He runs a furniture workshop in a commercial building. He has a serious and solid personality and appearance but sometimes enjoys making inappropriately cold jokes.

- Jang Hee-jin as Jang Hee-jin

King Wang Bakery's part-timer.

- Yoon Jong-shin as Yoon Jong-shin

He is a DJ at a radio station where Hong Ji-min works. He was a popular singer back in the day but is now on the decline.

- Clara as Lee Sung-min

Radio PD who is in charge of Hong Ji-min and Yoon Jong-shin's radio program.

- Kim Dong-beom as Kim Dong-beom

Yoon Jong-shin's road manager.

- Moon Hee-joon as Moon Hee-joon

Aspiring entertainer affiliated with Jung Sun-kyung's entertainment agency, a young man who has been working hard for 10 years to achieve his dream of becoming an idol singer.

- No Min-woo as No Min-woo

He was originally a teacher at the English academy Eun-kyung and Bo-bae attended. He taught English by singing pop songs on the guitar, and after passing an audition, he became an idol trainee.

- Kim Hyun-woo as Kim Hyun-woo

Young CEO of a neighbourhood chicken restaurant.

- Park Jang-geun as Jang-geun

Hyun-woo's friend. Also runs the chicken restaurant.

=== Cameos and special appearances ===
- Park Myung-soo (Ep 07)
- Kim Heung-gook (Ep 31, Ep 45)
- Boom (Ep 36)
- Kim Sung-soo (Ep 51)
- MC Mong (Ep 53)
- Shin Eun-jung (Ep 63, Ep 64)
- Jeong Jun-ha (Ep 71)
- Taegoon (Ep 72)
- Kim Na-young (Ep 76, Ep 82)
- Kim Gu-ra (Ep 92)
- Norazo (Ep 111)
- Lee Hyuk-jae (Ep 115)
- Kim Hee-chul (Ep 116)
- Kim Hyun-chul (Ep 123)
- Sunny (Ep 126)
- Jessica Jung (Ep 126)
- Park Young-tae (Ep 131, Ep 132, Ep 133)
- Yoo Jae-ik
- Nam Hyun-joo
- Jeong Su-yeon
- Other viewer appearances - Scenes for which viewers apply to appear in the show.
