= Anniversary Anyway =

2019 South Korean web series

- Promotional poster
- Hangul: 어쨌든 기념일
- RR: Eojjaetdeun ginyeomil
- MR: Ŏtchaettŭn kinyŏmil
- Genre: Drama
- Starring: Hongseok; Nayun; Gyujin; Minseo; Jaesuk Lee; Park Ji-ye
- Country of origin: South Korea
- Original language: Korean
- No. of episodes: 14

Production
- Production company: 72 Seconds

Original release
- Network: Naver V (V Live)
- Release: May 21 – July 5, 2019

Anniversary Anyway (Korean: 어쨌든 기념일) is a South Korean web series starring Hongseok, Nayun, Gyujin, Minseo, Jaesuk Lee and Park Ji-ye, the series aired on Naver V (V Live) at 7:00 PM every Tuesday and Friday on May 5 to July 5, 2019.

== Cast ==
- Hongseok as Hong Woo-jae
- Nayun as Cha Sae-yi
- Gyujin as Doojin Gong
- Minseo as Kong Gong Jin
- Jaesuk Lee as Gu Yun Seung
- Park Ji-ye as Kim Wan
