= Your Neighbor's Wife =

2013 South Korean television series

- Promotional poster
- Hangul: 네 이웃의 아내
- RR: Ne iusui anae
- MR: Ne iusŭi anae
- Genre: Drama
- Written by: Kang Ji-yeon; Yoo Won; Lee Joon-yeong; Min Seon
- Directed by: Lee Tae-gon
- Starring: Yum Jung-ah; Jung Joon-ho; Shin Eun-kyung; Kim Yu-seok
- Music by: Nam Hye-seung
- Country of origin: South Korea
- Original language: Korean
- No. of episodes: 22

Production
- Producers: Kim Woon-ho; Park Joon-seo
- Running time: 70 minutes
- Production companies: DRM Media; Drama House

Original release
- Network: JTBC
- Release: October 14 – December 24, 2013

Your Neighbor's Wife (Korean: 네 이웃의 아내; RR: Ne iusui anae) is a 2013 South Korean television series starring Yum Jung-ah, Jung Joon-ho, Shin Eun-kyung and Kim Yu-seok. It aired on JTBC from October 14 to December 24, 2013.

== Synopsis ==
The story of two couples in their 40s who live in the same apartment building.

== Cast ==
=== Main ===
- Yum Jung-ah as Chae Song-ha
- Jung Joon-ho as Min Sang-shik
- Shin Eun-kyung as Hong Kyung-joo
- Kim Yu-seok as Ahn Sun-gyu

=== Supporting ===
- Jung Han-yong as Vice-president
- Kim Boo-sun as Gook Young-ja
- Lee Se-chang as Pig dad
- Yoon Ji-min as Kim Ji-young
- Yang Jin-woo as Director Jung
- Moon Bo-ryung as Eun-chae
- Yum Dong-hun as Yang Sang-moo
- Lee Byung-joon as President Bu
- Seo Yi-sook as Ha Sung-in
- Im Shi-eun as Min-kyung
- Im Je-noh as Min-seok
- Lee Han-na as Eun-mi
- Kim Seung-yoon as Min Eun-kyung
- Yoon Hong-bin as Tae-ho
- Kim Yong-hee as Doctor Yoon
- Jeon Jin-woo as Min-shik

== Original soundtrack ==
Your Neighbor's Wife OST

Soundtrack album by Various Artists
- Released: 2013
- Genre: Soundtrack
- Languages: Korean; English
- Label: Kakao M

=== Part 1 ===
Released on October 21, 2013
| No. | Title | Lyrics | Music | Artist | Length |
|---|---|---|---|---|---|
| 1. | "Believe in Love Again" (다시 사랑을 믿어) | Kim Mi-jin | 1601 | Shin Yu-mi | 3:05 |

=== Part 2 ===
Released on November 5, 2013
| No. | Title | Lyrics | Music | Artist | Length |
|---|---|---|---|---|---|
| 1. | "Only You" (그대 하나만) | Miyo | Miyo | Duk Hwan | 4:15 |

=== Part 3 ===
Released on November 19, 2013
| No. | Title | Lyrics | Music | Artist | Length |
|---|---|---|---|---|---|
| 1. | "Suddenly" (울컥) | Miyo | Miyo | Ji-yoon | 4:00 |

=== Part 4 ===
Released on December 9, 2013
| No. | Title | Artist | Length |
|---|---|---|---|
| 1. | "Bye Bye" (바이바이) | Chu Ga-yul | 3:41 |
| 2. | "When I Walk" (걷다보면) | Han Soo-ji | 3:23 |
| Total length: | | | 7:04 |

== Viewership ==
In this table, the blue numbers represent the lowest ratings and the red numbers represent the highest ratings.

| Ep. | Original broadcast date | Average audience share (AGB Nielsen) |
| Ep. | Original broadcast date | Nationwide |
|---|---|---|
| 1 | October 14, 2013 | 1.722% |
| 2 | October 15, 2013 | 2.205% |
| 3 | October 21, 2013 | 2.346% |
| 4 | October 22, 2013 | 2.816% |
| 5 | October 28, 2013 | 1.916% |
| 6 | October 29, 2013 | 2.642% |
| 7 | November 4, 2013 | 1.986% |
| 8 | November 5, 2013 | 2.431% |
| 9 | November 11, 2013 | 2.113% |
| 10 | November 12, 2013 | 2.678% |
| 11 | November 18, 2013 | 2.482% |
| 12 | November 19, 2013 | 2.861% |
| 13 | November 25, 2013 | 2.366% |
| 14 | November 26, 2013 | 2.607% |
| 15 | December 2, 2013 | 2.087% |
| 16 | December 3, 2013 | 2.519% |
| 17 | December 9, 2013 | 2.429% |
| 18 | December 10, 2013 | 2.190% |
| 19 | December 16, 2013 | 2.294% |
| 20 | December 17, 2013 | 2.459% |
| 21 | December 23, 2013 | 2.125% |
| 22 | December 24, 2013 | 2.457% |
| Average | | 2.351% |

- This drama airs on a cable channel/pay TV which normally has a relatively smaller audience compared to free-to-air TV/public broadcasters (KBS, SBS, MBC and EBS).
