= Jikji (TV series) =

South Korean drama television series

- Hangul: 직지
- RR: Jikji
- MR: Chikchi
- Genre: Historical
- Created by: Choi Won-suk
- Screenplay by: Ji Min-young (Lee Joo-hee)
- Directed by: Lee Chang-sup
- Creative director: Jang Ui-soon
- Starring: Han Min; Kim Jin-keun
- Composer: Nam Hye-seung
- Country of origin: South Korea
- Original language: Korean
- No. of seasons: 1
- No. of episodes: 1

Production
- Cinematography: Kim Seung-chul
- Editor: Jo In-hyung
- Running time: 80 minutes

Original release
- Network: MBC
- Release: December 3, 2005

Jikji (Korean: 직지; RR: Jikji) is a 2005 South Korean mini series starring Han Min and Kim Jin-keun. It aired on MBC on Saturday, 3 December 2005 at 21:40 until 01:10. This series aired as an HD special drama for the 44th anniversary of MBC's founding.

== Plot ==
It simultaneously shows that human love and the Buddha's mercy aren't different through Myo-Duk, who achieved the way of love and Baek-Woon, who achieved the way of victory and Buddhahood to save people from a dark age. It also tells about the chronicle life and love of them two and focuses on the heartbreaking love story of them who transcend their status.

Baek-Woon (played by Kim Jin-keun) was born as the youngest son of a poor family at the end of the Goryeo Dynasty and was raised by his grandmother. When his old mother suffers from the limitations of their status, she sends him to the temple at the age of 15 to follow the path of a monk. In the process, Baek-Woon then meets Myo-Duk (played by Han-Min), the daughter of a prestigious family, by chance while training at a mountain temple.

Myo-duk has an outstanding talent for her thrifty family, but her mother, who was her filial piety, died early and her concubine grew up in her hands, so she had a crooked personality. She used her beauty to make a prank on the children of her nobility, but she is in a state of self-defense. Later, they fall in fateful love, but when Baek-Woon leaves the temple for the capital, Myo-Duk becomes a monk herself and to be with him and create the "Jikji".

== Cast ==
=== Main ===
- Han Min as Myo-duk (묘덕; 20–40 years old)
  - A daughter from a noble family. Not like woman in her age, Myo-duk is excellent at archery, dance, calligraphy, painting and academic excellence.
- Kim Jin-geun as Baekwoon Kyung-han (백운경한; 37–60 years old)
  - His Personal name is Kyung-han (경한) and his courtesy name is Baek-woon (백운). He is the Jikji's founder.

=== Supporting ===
- Lee Jung-gil as King Chungsuk
- Yang Mi-kyung as Lady Won Deok-Bi
- Won Mi-won as Kyung-han's old mother
- Kim Byung-se as Prince Jungan, Princess Suchun's husband
- Lee Il-hwa as Princess Suchun, King Chungsuk's half sister
- Yoo Seung-bong as Myo-duk's father
- Cha Joo-ok as Myo-duk's stepmother
- Han Tae-il as head of Buddhist monk
- Kim Sang-koo as Kim Gye-saeng
- Hwang Ui-kwon as Lee-Saek
- Park Jong-sul as a Blacksmith
- Kim Heung-soo as Yuan Princess's bodyguard
- Ahn Su-jung as Yuan Princess
- Lee Young-joon as Buddhist monk
- Lee Duk-jin as Suk-Chan
- Yoon Su-hyun as Daljam monk
- Jang Nam-kyung as Lady Jo–neighbor

=== Extended cast ===
- Jang Tae-sung
- Choi Sung-woong
- Lee Hwa-jin
- Kim Nam-kil
- Yoo Jung-suk
- Choi Sun-young
- Park Tae-jin

== Production ==
- This series started filming in September 2005 exquisitely combined the secret scenery with the love of the main characters by using representative temples of Korea such as:
1. Seonunsa (선운사) in Gochang, North Jeolla Province.
2. Seonamsa (선암사) in Suncheon, South Jeolla Province.
3. Hwaeomsa (화엄사) in Gurye, South Jeolla Province.
4. Bongjeongsa (봉정사) in Andong, North Gyeongsang Province.
