= My Beautiful Bride =

2015 South Korean television series

- Promotional poster
- Hangul: 아름다운 나의 신부
- RR: Areumdaun naui sinbu
- MR: Arŭmdaun naŭi sinbu
- Genre: Action; Crime
- Written by: Yoo Sung-yeol
- Directed by: Kim Chul-kyoo; Kim Sang-woo
- Starring: Kim Mu-yeol; Lee Si-young; Ko Sung-hee; Ryu Seung-soo; Park Hae-joon
- Country of origin: South Korea
- Original language: Korean
- No. of episodes: 16

Production
- Camera setup: Single-camera
- Running time: 60 minutes
- Production company: Doremi Entertainment

Original release
- Network: OCN
- Release: June 20 – August 9, 2015

My Beautiful Bride (Korean: 아름다운 나의 신부; RR: Areumdaun naui sinbu) is a South Korean television series starring Kim Mu-yeol, Lee Si-young, Ko Sung-hee, Ryu Seung-soo, Park Hae-joon. The series aired on OCN every Saturday and Sunday at 22:20 (KST) from June 20 to August 9, 2015.

== Synopsis ==
A desperate love story about a man who pushes himself to the bitter end of the world to reclaim his beloved bride.

== Cast ==
=== Main ===
- Kim Mu-yeol as Kim Do-hyung
- Lee Si-young as Cha Yoon-mi
- Ko Sung-hee Yoon Joo-young / Yoon Joo-hee
- Ryu Seung-soo as Seo Jin-ki / Lee Ki-soo
- Park Hae-joon as Park Hyung-sik

=== Supporting ===
- Choi Byung-mo as Secretary Kim
- Son Jong-hak as Director Kang
- Lee Jae-yong as Song Hak-soo
- Lee Seung-yun as Lee Jin-sook
- Kim Bo-yun as Moon In-sook
- Han Sung-yun as Cha Yoon-mi
- Jo Han-chul as Park Tae-kyu
- Kim Sung-hoon as Shim Han-joo
- Park Hyun-woo as Kim Myung-hwan
- Lee Sun-ah as Oh Jung-yeon
- Park In-bae as Janggab (grove)
- Yoon Jin-ho as Lee Jang-ho
- Lee El as Son Hye-jung
- Shim Min as Kang Jung-hwa
- Kim Ye-ryeong as Joo-young's mother
- Park Soo-young as President Jo
- Lee Kyu-bok as Yoon Min-soo (Joo Young's older brother)
- Song Yi-woo as Min-soo's wife
- Park Kwang-jae
- Kim Min-sang
- Brian Joo
- Lee Moo-saeng as Do-hyung's lawyer

== Ratings ==
- In this table, The blue numbers represent the lowest ratings and the red numbers represent the highest ratings.

Episode #	Original broadcast date	Average audience share	
Episode #	Original broadcast date	AGB Nielsen Ratings	TNmS Ratings
1	June 20, 2015	0.690%	0.8%
2	June 21, 2015	0.723%	1.1%
3	June 27, 2015	0.635%	0.9%
4	June 28, 2015	1.008%	1.3%
5	July 4, 2015	0.901%	1.4%
6	July 5, 2015	0.686%	1.3%
7	July 11, 2015	0.778%	1.3%
8	July 12, 2015	0.879%	1.3%
9	July 18, 2015	0.690%	1.2%
10	July 19, 2015	1.112%	1.4%
11	July 25, 2015	0.870%	1.1%
12	July 26, 2015	1.146%	1.6%
13	August 1, 2015	1.009%	1.4%
14	August 2, 2015	1.028%	1.1%
15	August 8, 2015	1.094%	1.3%
16	August 9, 2015	1.287%	1.9%
Average		0.91%	1.28%

- Note: This drama airs on a cable channel/pay TV which normally has a relatively smaller audience compared to free-to-air TV/public broadcasters (KBS, SBS & MBC & EBS).
