= IZ (band) =

Korean boyband

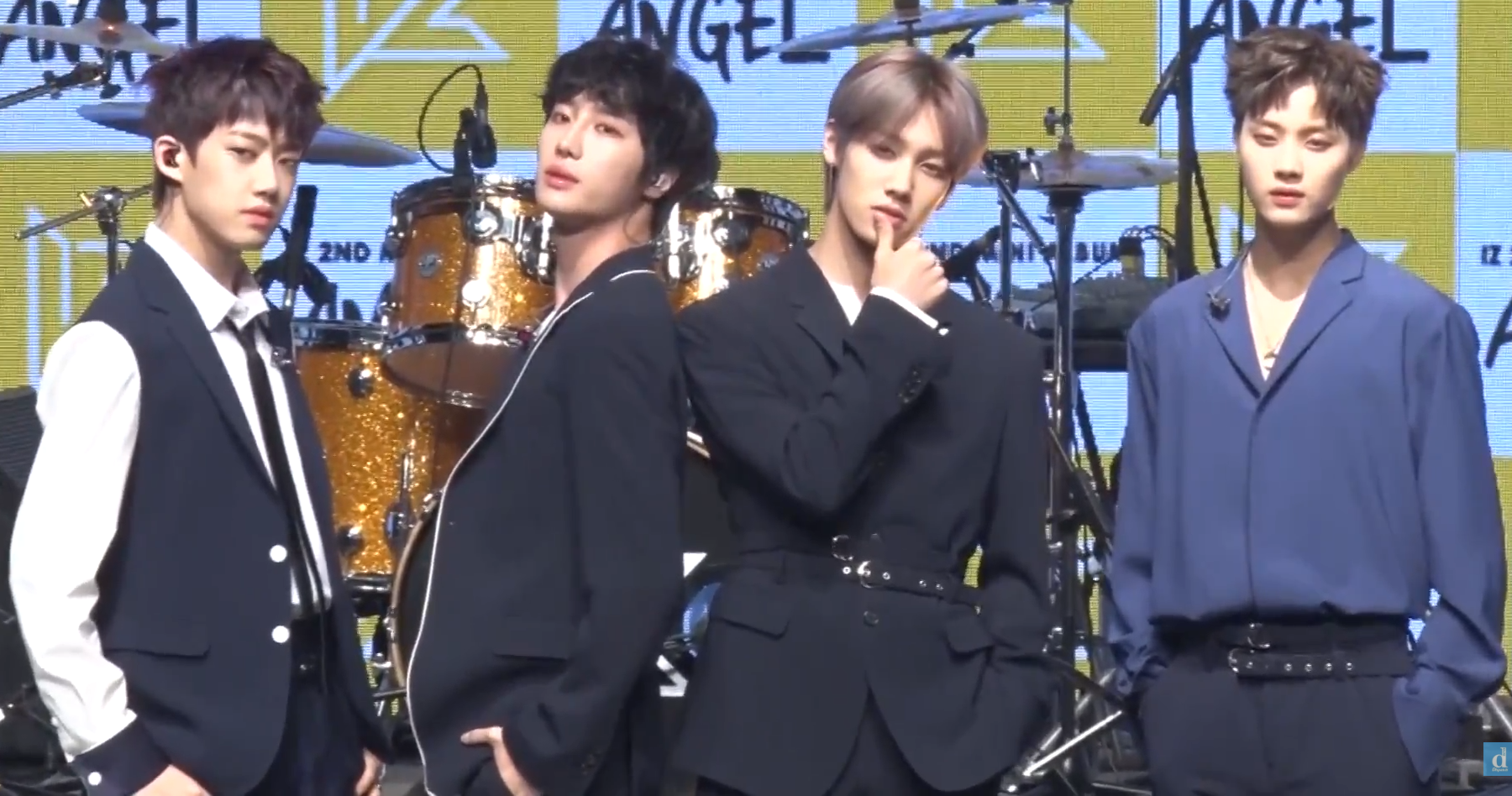
- From left to right: Junyoung, Jihoo, Hyunjun, Woosu

Background information
- Origin: Seoul, South Korea
- Genres: K-pop
- Years active: 2017–present
- Labels: Music K Entertainment; Sony Music; Columbia Records
- Members: Jihoo; Woosu; Hyunjun; Junyoung
- Website: musickent.com/artist_iz/

IZ (Korean: 아이즈; pronounced "eyes") is a South Korean boyband formed by Music K Entertainment in 2017. They debuted on August 31, 2017, with the album All You Want.

== Members ==
- Hyunjun (현준) – guitar, leader
- Jihoo (지후) – vocals
- Woosu (우수) – drums
- Junyoung (준영) – bass

== Discography ==
=== Extended plays ===
Title	Album details	Peak chart positions	Sales
Title	Album details	KOR	Sales
All You Want	Released: August 31, 2017; Label: Music K Entertainment, LOEN Entertainment; Formats: CD, digital download; Track listing: 1. Prologue Storm; 2. All You Want (다해); 3. Is You (너라서); 4. Crush on You (저격해); 5. You & Me (너도 나처럼)	22	KOR: 2,776
Angel	Released: May 1, 2018; Label: Music K Entertainment, Kakao M, Sony Music, Columbia Records; Formats: CD, digital download; Track listing: 1. Granulate (새살); 2. Angel; 3. Ole Ole; 4. Tears (ㅠㅠ (너 없는 하루)); 5. Heartbeat (난리법석이야); 6. Crush on You (저격해); 7. Angel (Inst.)	29	KOR: 2,027

=== Single albums ===
Title	Album details	Peak chart positions	Sales
Title	Album details	KOR	Sales
Re: IZ	Released: May 23, 2019; Label: Music K Entertainment, Kakao M, Sony Music, Columbia Records; Formats: CD, digital download; Track listing: 1. Re:IZ (Intro) (날개); 2. Eden (에덴); 3. Hello (안녕); 4. Eden (에덴) (Inst.); 5. Hello (안녕) (Inst.)	10	KOR: 7,192+
From: Iz	Released: August 21, 2019; Label: Music K Entertainment, Kakao M, Sony Music, Columbia Records; Formats: CD, digital download; Track listing: 1. Lovers (Intro); 2. Final Kiss (너와의 추억은 항상 여름같아); 3. Burn; 4. Road to the Sun (구름의 속도); 5. Final Kiss (너와의 추억은 항상 여름같아) (Inst.)	43	1,235
Memento	Released: November 29, 2019; Label: Music K Entertainment, Kakao M, Sony Music, Columbia Records; Formats: CD, digital download; Track listing: 1. Memento (메멘토); 2. Memento (메멘토) (Inst.)	53	—N/a
The:IZ	Released: January 31, 2020; Label: Music K Entertainment, Kakao M, Sony Music, Columbia Records; Formats: CD, digital download; Track listing: 1. The Day (Prod. Sweetune); 2. Superstition; 3. See you (Outro)	15	KOR: 4,186

=== Singles ===
Title	Year	Peak chart positions		Album
Title	Year	KOR Dig.	KOR Album	Album
"All You Want" (다해)	2017	—	—	All You Want
"Angel"	2018	—	—	Angel
"Eden" (에덴)	2019	—	—	Re: IZ
"Final Kiss" (너와의 추억은 항상 여름같아)	2019	—	—	From: IZ
"Memento" (메멘토)	2019	—	80	Memento
"The Day"	2020	—	—	The:IZ
"Say Yes" (겨우살이)	2021	—	—	StorIZ: New Born
"Missing U"	2021	—	—	StorIZ: Blossom
"Flower Language" (미운 꽃말)	2021	—	—	StorIZ: Break
"—" denotes releases that did not chart.

== Awards and nominations ==
=== Soribada Best K-Music Awards ===
Year	Category	Recipient	Result
2018	New Hallyu Rookie Award	IZ	Won

=== Korean Culture Entertainment Awards ===
Year	Category	Recipient	Result
2019	K-pop Singer Award	IZ	Won

=== The Fact Music Awards ===
Year	Category	Recipient	Result
2019	Band Performer of the Year	IZ	Won
