= Fight for My Way =

2017 South Korean TV series

- Promotional poster
- Hangul: 쌈 마이웨이
- Lit.: Fight My Way
- RR: Ssam maiwei
- MR: Ssam maiwei
- Genre: Workplace; Slice of Life; Romance
- Written by: Lim Sang-choon
- Directed by: Lee Na-jeong
- Starring: Park Seo-joon; Kim Ji-won; Ahn Jae-hong; Song Ha-yoon
- Music by: Eom Ki-yeop
- Country of origin: South Korea
- Original language: Korean
- No. of episodes: 16

Production
- Executive producers: Moon Joon-ha; Kim Hee-yeol; Jeon San
- Producer: Yoon Jae-hyuk
- Running time: 70 minutes
- Production company: Pan Entertainment
- Budget: ₩3.8 billion

Original release
- Network: KBS2
- Release: May 22 – July 11, 2017

Fight For My Way (Korean: 쌈 마이웨이) is a 2017 South Korean television series starring Park Seo-joon and Kim Ji-won, with Ahn Jae-hong and Song Ha-yoon. It premiered on May 22, 2017, every Monday and Tuesday at 22:00 (KST) on KBS2.

The series was the slot leader during its entire run and topped the TV popularity index for 3 consecutive weeks. It was praised for its realistic plot and great performances. Fight For My Way was later adapted into a manhwa. In 2026, the series received a Filipino adaptation with the same name.

== Synopsis ==
The story is about underdogs with big dreams struggling to survive and striving for success in a career they are under-qualified for. A long time friendship is blossoming into romance between two immature friends Ko Dong-man (Park Seo-joon) and Choi Ae-ra (Kim Ji-won) whose childish dynamic has not changed despite reaching adulthood.

== Cast ==
=== Main ===
==== The Crazy Fantastic Four ====
They are four individuals who are considered to be lacking of abilities, but eventually in the series, they will grow as both individuals and friends.

- Park Seo-joon as Ko Dong-man
  - Jo Yeon-ho as young Ko Dong-man

A former taekwondo player who used to be famous but had to stop because of a painful past is now a nameless mixed martial arts fighter. Later, he falls in love with his long-time best friend, Choi Ae-ra, while struggling to succeed in his career and love life.

- Kim Ji-won as Choi Ae-ra
  - Lee Han-seo as young Choi Ae-ra

A strong and sassy girl. She is working as a department store employee at the information desk, but dreams of becoming an announcer. She has not given up on her dreams, even though she is not eligible and faces too much humiliation, specifically because of her rival in love, Park Hye-ran. She keeps striving for her dream to come true.

- Ahn Jae-hong as Kim Joo-man

The so-called "brain" of the four. He landed a permanent position at a home shopping network. His loyalty and love for his girlfriend of six years will be put to the test.

- Song Ha-yoon as Baek Seol-hee
  - Kim Ha-yeon as young Baek Seol-hee

An innocent and quirky girl of the group, who is working in customer service at the home shopping network. For six years, her universe revolves around Joo-man, and she is extremely in love with him.

=== Supporting ===
==== People related to Dong-man ====
- Son Byong-ho as Go Hyung-shik

Dong-man's father.

- Kim Ye-ryeong as Park Soon-yang

Dong-man's mother.

- Jo Eun-yoo as Go Dong-hee
  - Go Na-hee as young Go Dong-hee

Dong-man's younger sister.

- Lee Elijah as Park Hye-ran

Dong-man's ex-girlfriend. A famous anchor who is divorced after being married to a wealthy man, but still has luck in fame and appearance. She's trying to get back with Dong-man after dumping him.

- Kim Sung-oh as Hwang Jang-ho

Dong-man's taekwondo coach and loyal friend.

==== People related to Ae-ra ====
- Jeon Bae-soo as Choi Cheon-gap

Ae-ra's father.

- Jin Hee-kyung as Hwang Bok-hee / Ganako Hwang

A mysterious woman in the village where the main characters live. Choi Ae-ra's mother who left her due to some problems and went to Japan. She had breast cancer, which was cured. She returned to South Korea as fantastic four's landlady and lived with her adopted son Nam-il. She had a mysterious flip mobile in which she kept many photographs of Ae-ra and Nam-il as memories of their childhood.

- Kang Ki-doong as Jang Kyung-goo

A broadcasting production director and an acquaintance of Ae-ra.

- Kwak Si-yang as Kim Nam-il, Hwang Bok-hee/Ganako Hwang's adopted son.

==== People related to Joo-man ====
- Pyo Ye-jin as Jang Ye-jin

Joo-man's new workmate at the home shopping network, secretly a daughter of a wealthy household. She will put Joo-man and Seol-hee's love for each other to the test.

- Kim Hee-chang as Head of Department Choi

Joo-man's and Ye-jin's boss.

==== People related to Seol-hee ====
- Lee Jung-eun as Geum-bok

Seol-hee's mother.

- Kim Hak-sun as Baek Jang-soo

Seol-hee's father.

=== Others ===
- Kim Gun-woo as Kim Tak-su

A star fighter and Dong-man's biggest rival.

- Yang Kyung-won as Cho-yun
- Chae Dong-hyun as Yang Tae-hee

Tak-su's manager.

- Park Gyu-young as Ahn Su-jeong
- Oh Eui-shik as Manager Oh
- Yoon Sa-bong as Kim Joo-hye
- Yang Ki-won as Choi Won-bo

Tak-su's coach.

- Go Geon-han as Moo-bin's colleague
- Lee Chae-eun
- Gong Sang-ah
- Lee Seo-hwan
- Baek Ji-won
- Kim Jae-cheol
- Jung Bo-ram
- Yoo Min-joo
- Park Ye-jin
- Yoon Yeo-hak
- Cha Sang-mi
- Kim Se-joon
- Park Seung-chan
- Han Geu-rim
- Ji Sung-geun
- Choi Na-moo
- Choi Hyo-eun as Mai-ei
- Kim Tae-rang (Voice appearance)
- Yoon Ji-yeon (Voice appearance)

=== Special appearances ===
- Kwak Dong-yeon as Kim Moo-ki (Ep. 1)

Ae-ra's ex-boyfriend, who cheated on her.

- Jin Ji-hee as Jang Bo-ram (Ep. 1 & 7)

Dong-man's schoolmate.

- Choi Woo-shik as Park Moo-bin (Ep. 1–7)

Dong-man's high school classmate who grew up to be a sweet-seeming but actually conceited doctor. He falls for Ae-ra and tries to win her over, but it is later revealed that he is engaged.

- Jung Soo-young as Young-sook (Ep. 1)

Moo-ki's new girlfriend, who is much older than them and runs a successful restaurant.

- Hwang Bo-ra as Park Chan-sook (Ep. 1 & 2)

Ae-ra's university friend.

- Kim Dae-hwan
- In Gyo-jin as Kim In-gyo

Ae-ra's colleague.

- Jo Mi-ryung as Lee Ji-sook (Ep. 5)

Department store VIP customer.

- Ji Hye-ran as Sonya (Ep. 6 & 8)

Tak-su's girlfriend.

- Shin Yong-moon as Ring Announcer (Ep. 8)
- Kwak Si-yang as Kim Nam-il (Ep. 11–16)

Hwang Bok-hee's son.

- Julien Kang as John Carlos (Ep. 13–14, 16)

Dong-man's trainer.

== Production ==
- The drama is directed by Lee Na-jeong (The Innocent Man) and written by Im Sang-choon (Becky's Back).
- First script reading took place on March 24, 2017 at the KBS Annex Building in Yeouido, Seoul, South Korea.
- It was confirmed that the cast and crew of Fight For My Way would be taking a reward vacation to Jeju Island after the conclusion of the drama.

== Original soundtrack ==
Fight For My Way OST Album

Soundtrack album by Various artists
- Released: 2017
- Genre: Soundtrack
- Language: Korean
- Label: Pan/RIAK/Warner

=== Part 1 ===
No.	Title	Lyrics	Music	Artist	Length
1.	"Dumbhead"	Lee Jong-soo; Kim Hyo-shin; Lee Hyun-joo; Miste.Lee	Lee Jong-soo; Lee Han-min	Arie Band	03:19
2.	"Dumbhead" (Inst.)		Lee Jong-soo; Lee Han-min		03:19
Total length:					06:38

=== Part 2 ===
No.	Title	Lyrics	Music	Artist	Length
1.	"Good Morning" (굿모닝)	Park Woo-sang	Park Woo-sang	Kassy	03:07
2.	"Good Morning" (Inst.)		Park Woo-sang		03:07
Total length:					06:14

=== Part 3 ===
No.	Title	Lyrics	Music	Artists	Length
1.	"Fight for My Way" (쌈,마이웨이)	Eom Ki-yeob	Eom Ki-yeob	HerCheck (Super Kidd); 2morrow	03:34
2.	"Fight for My Way" (Inst.)		Eom Ki-yeob		03:34
Total length:					07:08

=== Part 4 ===
No.	Title	Lyrics	Music	Artists	Length
1.	"Ambiguous" (알듯 말듯해)	August08	Key U; Wild Boar; August08	Seo Eunkwang, Im Hyun-sik, Yook Sung-jae (BtoB)	03:45
2.	"Ambiguous" (Inst.)		Key U; Wild Boar; August08		03:45
Total length:					07:30

=== Part 5 ===
No.	Title	Lyrics	Music	Artist	Length
1.	"Night Is Gone, Again" (또 밤이 지나버렸네)	Eom Ki-yeob; Lee Young-joo	L.a.V	Ryu Ji-hyun	03:30
2.	"Night Is Gone, Again" (Inst.)		L.a.V		03:30
Total length:					07:00

=== Special track ===
No.	Title	Lyrics	Music	Artists	Length
1.	"I Miss U"	Kim Bum-joo; Cha Yeoul	Kim Bum-joo; Cha Yeoul	Cha Yeoul	03:23
2.	"I Miss U" (Inst.)		Kim Bum-joo; Cha Yeoul		03:23
Total length:					06:46

=== Charted songs ===
Chart performance

Title	Year	Peak chart positions	Sales	Remarks
Title	Year	KOR Gaon	Sales	Remarks
"Good Morning" (Kassy)	2017	89	KOR: 21,935+	Part 2
"Ambiguous" (Seo Eunkwang, Im Hyun-sik, Yook Sung-jae (BtoB))	2017	37	KOR: 155,093+	Part 4

== Ratings ==
Ep.	Original broadcast date	Average audience share			
Ep.	Original broadcast date	Nielsen Korea		TNmS	
Ep.	Original broadcast date	Nationwide	Seoul	Nationwide	Seoul
1	May 22, 2017	5.4% (NR)	6.2% (NR)	5.6% (NR)	6.4% (NR)
2	May 23, 2017	6.0% (NR)	6.3% (NR)	6.4% (NR)	6.7% (18th)
3	May 29, 2017	10.7% (7th)	11.4% (5th)	9.1% (11th)	10.2% (6th)
4	May 30, 2017	10.0% (6th)	10.5% (5th)	9.0% (9th)	10.9% (4th)
5	June 5, 2017	10.6% (5th)	11.5% (4th)	8.3% (11th)	9.7% (6th)
6	June 6, 2017	11.4% (5th)	12.1% (4th)	9.4% (8th)	11.4% (4th)
7	June 12, 2017	10.9% (5th)	11.3% (4th)	8.7% (12th)	9.2% (5th)
8	June 13, 2017	9.8% (6th)	10.1% (5th)	8.7% (13th)	10.1% (4th)
9	June 19, 2017	12.1% (4th)	13.5% (4th)	9.9% (8th)	12.0% (4th)
10	June 20, 2017	11.2% (5th)	11.9% (4th)	10.3% (6th)	11.3% (4th)
11	June 26, 2017	12.0% (5th)	13.2% (4th)	10.5% (5th)	12.7% (4th)
12	June 27, 2017	11.9% (4th)	13.1% (4th)	8.5% (12th)	9.4% (5th)
13	July 3, 2017	12.6% (4th)	13.5% (4th)	11.2% (8th)	11.6% (4th)
14	July 4, 2017	13.0% (4th)	14.2% (4th)	11.4% (6th)	11.5% (4th)
15	July 10, 2017	12.9% (4th)	13.8% (4th)	12.0% (5th)	12.5% (4th)
16	July 11, 2017	13.8% (4th)	14.4% (4th)	11.4% (9th)	11.4% (4th)
Average		10.9%	11.7%	9.4%	10.4%
In the table above, the blue numbers represent the lowest ratings and the red numbers represent the highest ratings.; NR denotes that the drama did not rank in the top 20 daily programs on that date.

== Adaptation ==
A Philippine adaptation of the series has been announced for Viva One which will premiere on November 20, 2026.

== Awards and nominations ==
Year	Award	Category	Recipient	Result	Ref.
2017	Brand of the Year Awards	Drama of the Year	Fight for My Way	Won	
2017	10th Korea Drama Awards	Excellence Award, Actor	Ahn Jae-hong	Nominated	
2017	10th Korea Drama Awards	Excellence Award, Actress	Song Ha-yoon	Won	
2017	1st The Seoul Awards	Best Drama	Fight for My Way	Nominated	
2017	1st The Seoul Awards	Best Supporting Actor	Ahn Jae-hong	Nominated	
2017	1st The Seoul Awards	Best Supporting Actress	Song Ha-yoon	Nominated	
2017	9th Melon Music Awards	Best OST	Kassy ("Good Morning")	Nominated	
2017	31st KBS Drama Awards	Top Excellence Award, Actor	Park Seo-joon	Nominated	
2017	31st KBS Drama Awards	Top Excellence Award, Actress	Kim Ji Won	Nominated	
2017	31st KBS Drama Awards	Excellence Award, Actor in a Miniseries	Park Seo-joon	Won	
2017	31st KBS Drama Awards	Excellence Award, Actress in a Miniseries	Kim Ji Won	Won	
2017	31st KBS Drama Awards	Best Supporting Actor	Kim Sung-oh	Won	
2017	31st KBS Drama Awards	Best Supporting Actress	Song Ha-yoon	Nominated	
2017	31st KBS Drama Awards	Best New Actor	Ahn Jae-hong	Won	
2017	31st KBS Drama Awards	Best New Actress	Pyo Ye-jin	Nominated	
2017	31st KBS Drama Awards	Netizen Award – Male	Park Seo-joon	Won	
2017	31st KBS Drama Awards	Netizen Award – Female	Kim Ji Won	Won	
2017	31st KBS Drama Awards	Best Couple Award	Park Seo-joon & Kim Ji Won	Won	
2017	31st KBS Drama Awards	Best Couple Award	Ahn Jae-hong & Song Ha-yoon	Nominated	
2017	31st KBS Drama Awards	Best Young Actor	Jo Yeon-ho	Nominated	
2017	31st KBS Drama Awards	Best Young Actress	Lee Han-seo	Nominated	
2017	31st KBS Drama Awards	Best OST	Seo Eunkwang, Im Hyun-sik, Yook Sung-jae (BTOB) ("Ambiguous")	Won	
2018	30th Korea Producer Awards	Best Drama	Fight for My Way	Won	
2018	54th Baeksang Arts Awards	Best Drama	Fight for My Way	Nominated	
2018	54th Baeksang Arts Awards	Best Screenplay	Lim Sang-choon	Nominated	
2018	54th Baeksang Arts Awards	Best Actor	Park Seo-joon	Nominated	
2018	54th Baeksang Arts Awards	Best Supporting Actor	Ahn Jae-hong	Nominated	
2018	54th Baeksang Arts Awards	Best Supporting Actress	Song Ha-yoon	Nominated	
2018	KBS WORLD Global Fan Awards	Best Couple	Park Seo-joon & Kim Ji-won	Won	
2018	13th Seoul International Drama Awards	Best Comedy	Fight for My Way	Nominated	
2018	13th Seoul International Drama Awards	Excellence Award for Korean Drama	Fight for My Way	Won	
2018	13th Seoul International Drama Awards	Best Screenwriter	Lim Sang-choon	Nominated	
2018	13th Seoul International Drama Awards	Outstanding Korean Actor	Park Seo-joon	Won	
2018	13th Seoul International Drama Awards	Outstanding Korean Actress	Kim Ji Won	Nominated	
