= Love Returns (TV series) =

2017 South Korean television series

- Promotional poster
- Also known as: Hate To Love You
- Hangul: 미워도 사랑해
- Lit.: I Love Even If I Hate
- RR: Miwodo saranghae
- MR: Miwŏdo saranghae
- Genre: Family; Melodrama
- Written by: Kim Hong-joo
- Directed by: Park Ki-ho
- Creative directors: Lee Min-soo; Kim Soo-jin
- Starring: Lee Sung-yeol; Pyo Ye-jin; Lee Dong-ha; Han Hye-rin
- Ending theme: "Aurora Love" by Jungheum Band
- Country of origin: South Korea
- Original language: Korean
- No. of episodes: 120

Production
- Executive producer: Yoon Sung-sik
- Producer: Song Min-yeob
- Running time: 35 minutes
- Production company: KBS Drama Production

Original release
- Network: KBS1
- Release: November 13, 2017 – May 4, 2018

Love Returns (Korean: 미워도 사랑해; RR: Miwodo saranghae) is a 2017 South Korean television series starring Lee Sung-yeol, Pyo Ye-jin, Lee Dong-ha, and Han Hye-rin. The series aired daily on KBS1 from 8:25 p.m. to 9:00 p.m. (KST) starting from November 13, 2017.

== Synopsis ==
The drama follows the life a woman who ends up losing everything after living a turbulent life. When she starts anew from the bottom, her life blossoms. The value that holds us together is not blood nor law, but rather the love and affection between us.

== Cast ==
=== Main ===
- Lee Sung-yeol as Hong Seok-pyo

He grew up without knowing a mother's love because his parents were always busy with work. He is cranky and sensitive, and is very mistrustful of those who approach him. Thanks to his mother who is the founder of Genius Cosmetics, he is a major shareholder and CEO, and contributes to the company's growth. However, symptoms of a panic disorder cast dark shadows on his future. To top that off, he is falsely accused for malpractice and embezzlement, and ends up being put on probation for two years. To fulfill his pledge to the judge, he becomes an 'undercover boss' and works at the Genius Beauty Center to experience what it's like to be at the bottom of the social ladder. There, he meets the woman of his fate, Eun-jo.

- Pyo Ye-jin as Gil Eun-jo

She is a spontaneous, sentimental and stubborn woman. She hated her rich stepmother, Haengja, who came into her life when she was still in high school. She never treated Haengja like a mother even though she used her money like it was hers. But when she experiences her father's sudden death and stepmother's absence, she begins to realize what the love of family is. She starts anew from the bottom, and learns the true meaning of life.

- Lee Dong-ha as Byun Boo-shik

He had to live by himself since middle school because his stepfather rejected him and his mother barely looked after him. Five years later, she comes back to his side with a huge debt from his stepfather. That's when Boo-shik swears to the world that no matter what, he would live his life cunningly. He graduated from law school and became a lawyer at a late age. As a deep-dyed utilitarian, he chases benefits rather than duty or cause. He is gifted with the ability to please others, and he always puts on a mask, never revealing his real emotions.

- Han Hye-rin as Jung In-woo

She lived a difficult life because of her father who left the family after divorce. Her perseverance and righteousness helped her cope with this unfriendly world. She enters the Genius Beauty Center as an intern, thanks to the skin care certificate that she received during high school. But the head of the Beauty Center, Gu Jonghee, and a nasty customer named Gil Eunjo don't let her live in peace. One day, her hated father comes back with a huge sum of money in his hands. Life suddenly becomes fun for her.

=== Supporting ===
==== Eun-jo's family and people at Geum-dong market ====
- Song Ok-sook as Kim Haeng-ja
- Kim Sun-woong as Oh Dae Young
- Go Byung-wan as Gil Myung-jo
- Yoon Sa-bong as Park Bo-geum
- Kim Han-joon as Joo Yoon-bal
- Eun Seo-yeol as Min Yang-ah
- Ok Joo-ri as rice-cake shop president

==== In-woo's family and people at Sook-yi's Beauty Salon ====
- Lee Byung-joon as Jung Geun-seop
- Park Myung-shin as Jang Jung-sook
- Yoon Young-ah as Jung In-jung
- Lee Ah-hyun as Dong Mi-ae

==== Seok Pyo's family and people at genius group ====
- Kim Beop-rae as Goo Choong-seo
- Song Yoo-hyun as Goo Jong-hee
- Yoo Ji-yeon as Hong Kyung-ha

==== Others ====
- Kim Seul-gi as Secretary Lee
- Kim Ki-hyeon

== Production ==
The series had a working title, I Believe Even If I Hate (미워도 믿어도; Miwodo mideodo). Pyo Ye-jin and Lee Sung-yeol got the lead roles for the first time in this series.

== Original soundtrack ==
Love Returns OST

Soundtrack album by Various artists
- Released: November 14, 2017
- Genre: Soundtrack
- Languages: Korean, English
- Labels: Plus Media, Danal Entertainment

=== Part 1 ===
No.	Title	Artist	Length
1.	"Aurora (오로라)"	Jungheum Band	03:11
2.	"Aurora (오로라)" (Inst.)		03:11
Total length:			06:22

=== Part 2 ===
No.	Title	Artist	Length
1.	"That Person (그사람)"	J-Cera	03:56
2.	"That Person (그사람)" (Inst.)		03:56
Total length:			07:12

=== Part 3 ===
No.	Title	Artist	Length
1.	"You're Beautiful (넌 예뻐)"	Takada Kenta	3:01
2.	"You're Beautiful (넌 예뻐)" (Inst.)		3:01
Total length:			6:02

=== Part 4 ===
No.	Title	Artist	Length
1.	"Because I Love You (그래도 사랑이니까)"	Jo Moon-geun	4:00
2.	"Because I Love You (그래도 사랑이니까)" (Inst.)		4:00
Total length:			8:00

=== Part 5 ===
No.	Title	Lyrics	Artist	Length
1.	"If I Were (내가 만일)"	Kim Bum-soo	Keumjo (Nine Muses)	3:30
2.	"If I Were (내가 만일)" (Inst.)			3:30
Total length:				7:00

=== Part 6 ===
No.	Title	Artist	Length
1.	"The Person Who Gives Happiness (행복을 주는 사람)"	Serri (Dal Shabet)	3:04
2.	"The Person Who Gives Happiness (행복을 주는 사람)" (Inst.)		3:04
Total length:			6:08

=== Part 7 ===
No.	Title	Artist	Length
1.	"Waiting For You (널 기다리다)"	Arie Band	3:35
2.	"Waiting For You (널 기다리다)" (Inst.)		3:35
Total length:			9:08

=== Part 8 ===
No.	Title	Artist	Length
1.	"Eyes Nose Lips (눈코입)"	Live Yubin	4:34
2.	"Eyes Nose Lips (눈코입)" (Inst.)		4:34

== Ratings ==
Ep.	Original broadcast date	Average audience share			
Ep.	Original broadcast date	TNmS		AGB Nielsen	
Ep.	Original broadcast date	Nationwide	Seoul	Nationwide	Seoul
1	November 13, 2017	19.6% (1st)	16.0% (1st)	18.5% (1st)	17.5% (1st)
2	November 14, 2017	17.8% (1st)	13.2% (3rd)	17.4% (1st)	16.0% (1st)
3	November 16, 2017	17.9% (1st)	14.2% (1st)	15.8% (1st)	14.8% (1st)
4	November 17, 2017	17.8% (1st)	14.3% (2nd)	15.3% (1st)	14.0% (1st)
5	November 20, 2017	17.1% (1st)	13.7% (1st)	17.3% (1st)	15.6% (1st)
6	November 21, 2017	18.5% (1st)	14.8% (1st)	17.5% (1st)	16.0% (1st)
7	November 22, 2017	17.8% (1st)	14.4% (1st)	16.6% (1st)	15.3% (1st)
8	November 23, 2017	18.5% (1st)	14.7% (1st)	16.8% (1st)	15.7% (1st)
9	November 24, 2017	17.5% (2nd)	14.4% (2nd)	16.3% (1st)	14.7% (1st)
10	November 27, 2017	17.9% (1st)	14.2% (1st)	16.3% (1st)	14.9% (1st)
11	November 28, 2017	17.4% (1st)	14.1% (1st)	16.9% (1st)	16.4% (1st)
12	November 29, 2017	17.9% (1st)	15.1% (1st)	16.0% (1st)	15.1% (1st)
13	November 30, 2017	18.3% (1st)	15.2% (1st)	17.6% (1st)	16.3% (1st)
14	December 1, 2017	16.0% (2nd)	13.0% (3rd)	15.4% (1st)	14.4% (2nd)
15	December 4, 2017	18.4% (2nd)	14.9% (2nd)	16.1% (1st)	14.8% (1st)
16	December 5, 2017	16.6% (2nd)	12.5% (2nd)	16.6% (1st)	15.6% (1st)
17	December 6, 2017	17.3% (1st)	14.8% (2nd)	16.4% (1st)	15.1% (1st)
18	December 7, 2017	19.3% (1st)	15.7% (1st)	17.3% (1st)	16.1% (1st)
19	December 8, 2017	17.4% (2nd)	14.2% (2nd)	15.9% (1st)	14.6% (2nd)
20	December 11, 2017	18.5% (1st)	15.0% (1st)	16.4% (1st)	15.0% (1st)
21	December 12, 2017	17.6% (2nd)	14.6% (1st)	16.7% (1st)	15.8% (1st)
22	December 13, 2017	17.8% (2nd)	14.7% (1st)	16.9% (1st)	14.9% (1st)
23	December 14, 2017	19.8% (1st)	16.0% (1st)	17.8% (1st)	16.4% (1st)
24	December 15, 2017	17.1% (2nd)	12.8% (3rd)	17.0% (1st)	15.5% (1st)
25	December 18, 2017	19.3% (2nd)	14.4% (2nd)	18.3% (1st)	17.3% (1st)
26	December 19, 2017	18.6% (2nd)	14.2% (2nd)	17.9% (1st)	16.6% (1st)
27	December 20, 2017	18.3% (2nd)	14.8% (2nd)	17.7% (1st)	16.9% (1st)
28	December 21, 2017	18.2% (2nd)	13.8% (2nd)	16.2% (2nd)	14.1% (2nd)
29	December 22, 2017	16.8% (2nd)	12.5% (2nd)	17.1% (1st)	15.9% (2nd)
30	December 25, 2017	18.8% (1st)	15.0% (1st)	17.7% (1st)	15.5% (2nd)
31	December 26, 2017	20.1% (2nd)	16.4% (2nd)	18.2% (2nd)	16.3% (2nd)
32	December 27, 2017	19.7% (2nd)	15.0% (2nd)	18.1% (1st)	17.1% (1st)
33	December 28, 2017	20.1% (2nd)	15.3% (2nd)	17.8% (1st)	16.3% (1st)
34	December 29, 2017	19.7% (2nd)	15.2% (2nd)	16.9% (2nd)	14.9% (2nd)
35	January 1, 2018	19.8% (2nd)	15.7% (2nd)	19.5% (2nd)	18.2% (2nd)
36	January 2, 2018	20.8% (2nd)	16.6% (2nd)	18.7% (2nd)	17.5% (2nd)
37	January 3, 2018	19.4% (2nd)	14.9% (2nd)	18.6% (2nd)	17.6% (2nd)
38	January 4, 2018	20.0% (2nd)	15.8% (2nd)	17.6% (2nd)	15.9% (2nd)
39	January 5, 2018	19.8% (2nd)	15.7% (2nd)	19.0% (2nd)	17.4% (2nd)
40	January 8, 2018	21.6% (2nd)	16.5%	18.8% (2nd)	16.8% (2nd)
41	January 9, 2018	18.4% (2nd)	14.3%	17.9% (2nd)	15.7% (2nd)
42	January 10, 2018	19.0% (2nd)	15.9%	18.6% (2nd)	16.7% (2nd)
43	January 11, 2018	20.8% (2nd)	16.6%	19.1% (2nd)	16.7% (2nd)
44	January 12, 2018	19.5% (2nd)	15.4%	18.9% (2nd)	17.1% (2nd)
45	January 15, 2018	21.8% (2nd)	17.7%	19.1% (2nd)	16.6% (2nd)
46	January 16, 2018	21.1% (2nd)	17.0%	19.2% (1st)	17.6% (1st)
47	January 17, 2018	19.9% (2nd)	15.8%	18.9% (2nd)	17.4% (2nd)
48	January 18, 2018	21.7% (2nd)	17.6%	17.9% (2nd)	16.1% (2nd)
49	January 19, 2018	20.2% (2nd)	16.1%	17.3% (2nd)	15.8% (2nd)
50	January 22, 2018	21.9% (2nd)	17.8%	20.1% (1st)	18.2% (1st)
51	January 23, 2018	21.1% (2nd)	16.9%	20.0% (1st)	18.4% (1st)
52	January 24, 2018	21.4% (2nd)	17.2%	20.0% (1st)	18.3% (1st)
53	January 25, 2018	21.8% (2nd)	18.3%	19.0% (2nd)	17.5% (2nd)
54	January 26, 2018	21.6% (2nd)	17.4%	18.5% (2nd)	16.5% (2nd)
55	January 29, 2018	22.0% (2nd)	19.5%	20.6% (1st)	18.1% (1st)
56	January 30, 2018	21.6% (2nd)	17.5%	19.9% (2nd)	18.1% (2nd)
57	January 31, 2018	21.7% (2nd)	18.3%	20.2% (2nd)	18.8% (1st)
58	February 1, 2018	22.4% (2nd)	18.6%	19.8% (2nd)	18.0% (1st)
59	February 2, 2018	21.6% (2nd)	17.7%	19.0% (2nd)	17.1% (2nd)
60	February 5, 2018	20.0% (2nd)	16.1%	17.9% (2nd)	16.0% (2nd)
61	February 6, 2018	22.1% (2nd)	18.6%	19.2% (2nd)	17.7% (2nd)
62	February 7, 2018	15.3% (4th)	11.0%	14.6% (4th)	14.3% (4th)
63	February 8, 2018	21.0% (1st)	17.6%	18.7% (1st)	17.3% (1st)
64	February 12, 2018	17.7% (1st)	13.2%	17.3% (1st)	15.8% (1st)
65	February 13, 2018	14.9% (1st)	10.8%	13.5% (1st)	12.5% (2nd)
66	February 14, 2018	18.7% (1st)	14.8%	17.7% (1st)	16.9% (2nd)
67	February 15, 2018	10.4% (3rd)	6.3%	10.6% (2nd)	10.4% (2nd)
68	February 16, 2018	14.8% (1st)	10.2%	15.0% (1st)	14.4% (2nd)
69	February 19, 2018	18.2% (1st)	14.0%	17.1% (1st)	16.1% (1st)
70	February 20, 2018	14.2% (3rd)	10.6%	13.2% (3rd)	12.7% (4th)
71	February 21, 2018	16.4% (1st)	12.7%	14.6% (2nd)	13.9% (2nd)
72	February 22, 2018	17.0% (1st)	13.3%	16.0% (2nd)	14.4% (3rd)
73	February 23, 2018	14.4% (1st)	10.0%	13.4% (2nd)	13.1% (2nd)
74	February 26, 2018	23.5% (1st)	19.6%	21.9% (1st)	21.0% (1st)
75	February 27, 2018	23.7% (1st)	20.1%	22.0% (1st)	20.4% (1st)
76	February 28, 2018	24.3% (1st)	20.4%	21.1% (1st)	19.2% (1st)
77	March 1, 2018	21.4% (1st)	20.2%	21.0% (1st)	19.0% (1st)
78	March 2, 2018	23.9% (1st)	19.8%	21.3% (1st)	20.2% (1st)
79	March 5, 2018	25.9% (1st)	22.3%	21.7% (1st)	20.1% (1st)
80	March 6, 2018	23.7% (1st)	19.6%	20.8% (1st)	19.9% (1st)
81	March 7, 2018	23.8% (1st)	20.3%	19.9% (1st)	18.4% (1st)
82	March 8, 2018	24.3% (1st)	20.5%	21.3% (1st)	19.4% (1st)
83	March 12, 2018	23.7% (1st)	20.0%	19.9% (1st)	18.2% (1st)
84	March 13, 2018	23.9% (1st)	20.2%	19.8% (1st)	18.1% (1st)
85	March 14, 2018	22.9% (1st)	19.0%	20.1% (1st)	19.2% (1st)
86	March 15, 2018	24.2% (1st)	20.5%	21.6% (1st)	20.4% (1st)
87	March 16, 2018	23.7% (1st)	20.1%	19.2% (1st)	17.6% (1st)
88	March 19, 2018	23.7% (1st)	19.5%	21.3% (1st)	20.1% (1st)
89	March 20, 2018	24.5% (1st)	21.0%	20.1% (1st)	18.6% (1st)
90	March 21, 2018	24.2% (1st)	20.3%	20.6% (1st)	19.4% (1st)
91	March 22, 2018	23.8% (1st)	19.5%	19.4% (1st)	17.9% (2nd)
92	March 23, 2018	22.4% (1st)	18.2%	19.6% (1st)	18.7% (1st)
93	March 26, 2018	23.5% (1st)	19.8%	19.9% (1st)	18.2% (1st)
94	March 27, 2018	21.7% (1st)	17.5%	19.4% (1st)	18.2% (1st)
95	March 28, 2018	21.3% (1st)	17.0%	19.4% (1st)	18.7% (1st)
96	March 29, 2018	23.1% (1st)	19.2%	19.9% (1st)	19.0% (1st)
97	March 30, 2018	21.2% (1st)	16.9%	18.1% (1st)	16.1% (1st)
98	April 2, 2018	23.2% (1st)	19.3%	20.4% (1st)	19.5% (1st)
99	April 3, 2018	22.0% (1st)	18.2%	19.4% (1st)	17.8% (1st)
100	April 4, 2018	21.8% (1st)	17.7%	19.6% (1st)	18.5% (1st)
101	April 6, 2018	20.6% (1st)	16.5%	18.0% (1st)	16.0% (1st)
102	April 9, 2018	23.3% (1st)	18.9%	19.7% (1st)	18.3% (1st)
103	April 10, 2018	21.5% (1st)	17.1%	19.4% (1st)	19.0% (1st)
104	April 11, 2018	19.8% (1st)	16.0%	18.7% (1st)	17.9% (1st)
105	April 12, 2018	21.6% (1st)	17.2%	19.8% (1st)	19.0% (1st)
106	April 13, 2018	20.6% (1st)	16.0%	18.5% (1st)	17.9% (1st)
107	April 16, 2018	23.0% (1st)	19.6%	20.5% (1st)	19.1% (1st)
108	April 17, 2018	22.7% (1st)	18.5%	19.1% (1st)	18.1% (1st)
109	April 18, 2018	21.1% (1st)	16.8%	19.0% (1st)	17.9% (1st)
110	April 19, 2018	22.9% (1st)	18.7%	19.4% (1st)	18.2% (1st)
111	April 20, 2018	21.4% (1st)	17.3%	18.6% (1st)	17.5% (1st)
112	April 23, 2018	22.9% (1st)	19.0%	20.8% (1st)	18.7% (1st)
113	April 24, 2018	21.7% (1st)	17.5%	19.6% (1st)	17.2% (1st)
114	April 25, 2018	21.0% (1st)	17.1%	18.9% (1st)	18.0% (1st)
115	April 26, 2018	19.7% (1st)	15.4%	19.5% (1st)	18.2% (1st)
116	April 30, 2018	21.9% (1st)	18.3%	19.9% (1st)	18.4% (1st)
117	May 1, 2018	20.4% (1st)	16.5%	19.0% (1st)	17.1% (1st)
118	May 2, 2018	17.1% (1st)	13.0%	19.9% (1st)	18.9% (1st)
119	May 3, 2018	20.2% (1st)	16.1%	20.0% (1st)	19.0% (1st)
120	May 4, 2018	19.0% (1st)	14.8%	18.0% (1st)	16.9% (1st)
Average		20.3%	–	18.4%	17.0%
In the table above, the blue numbers represent the lowest published ratings and the red numbers represent the highest published ratings.

- Episode 3 did not air on November 15, due to special news coverage of the Pohang earthquake.
- Episode 64 did not air on February 9 due to coverage of the Opening Ceremonies of the 2018 PyeongChang Winter Olympic Games.
- Episode 83 did not air on March 9 due to coverage of the Opening Ceremonies of the 2018 PyeongChang Winter Paralympics Games.
- Episode 101 did not air on April 5 due to the special broadcast of the Spring is Coming concert held in Pyongyang, North Korea.
- Episode 116 did not air on April 27 due to special news coverage of the inter-Korean summit.

== Awards and nominations ==
Year	Award	Category	Recipient	Result	Ref.
2017	31st KBS Drama Awards	Best New Actress	Pyo Ye-jin	Nominated	
