= List of Arthdal Chronicles characters =

This is a list of characters of the South Korean television series Arthdal Chronicles.

== Cast overview ==
= Main cast (credited)
= Recurring cast (3+)
= Guest cast (1–2)

Character	Portrayed by	
Character	Season 1 (2019)	Season 2 (2023)
Main
Ta-gon	Jang Dong-gun^{1}	
Eun-seom / Saya	Song Joong-ki^{2}	Lee Joon-gi
Tan-ya	Kim Ji-won^{3}	Shin Se-kyung
Taealha	Kim Ok-vin^{4}	
Recurring
San-ung	Kim Eui-sung	Kim Eui-sung
Asa Ron	Lee Do-kyung	—N/a
Hae Mi-hol	Jo Sung-ha	
Dan-byeok	Park Byung-eun	
Moong-tae	Park Jin	
Moo-baek	Park Hae-joon	Park Hae-joon
Do-ti	Go Na-hee	
Gum-bool	Song Jae-ryong	
Book-soe	Kim Choong-gil	
Kitoha	Lee Ho-cheol	
Hae Tu-ak	Yoon Sa-bong	Yoon Sa-bong

- ^1 Jung Je-won and Moon Woo-jin portray a young Ta-gon.
- ^2 Kim Ye-jun portrays a young Eun-seom.
- ^3 Heo Jung-eun portrays a young Tan-ya.
- ^4 Kim Seo-yeon portrays a young Taealha.

== Main characters ==
=== Ta-gon ===
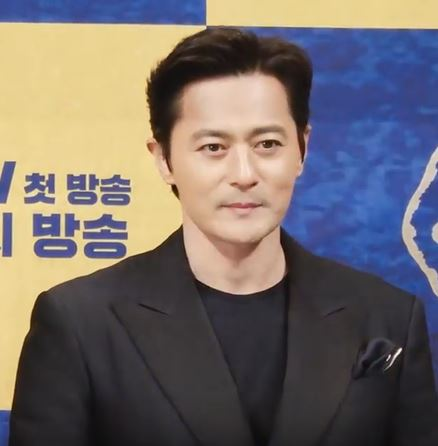
Jang Dong-gun plays Ta-gon

Ta-gon (Jang Dong-gun) is the first son of San-ung, leader of the Arthdal Union. Blessed with both intelligence and physicality, he's a genius strategist and warrior, the head of the Daekan troops. A hero who triumphed over the Neanthals in the Great War through his war strategy. After the Great War, San-ung declared the Great Hunt, and ordered the genocide of the Neanthal. Ta-gon was in the front lines of the Great Hunt, proving his ability. Under leadership of Ta-gon, the Daekan troops not only enforced the Great Hunt, but also pacified rebelling tribes that attempted to riot against the Arthdal Union. Ta-gon's reputation in Arthdal continued to rise.

As Ta-gon became a hero for all Arthdal tribes, one person watched with wary eyes – his own father, San-ung. Although he was initially pleased with Ta-gon's cunning strategies, as Ta-gon's eminence rose, San-ung became uneasy. Overcome by power-lust, San-ung tries to take down Ta-gon by trapping him. This incites a war between father and son, and Ta-gon leaps over the mountain of his father, and takes control of Arthdal. Ta-gon finally becomes the Hero of Arthdal. Ta-gon is also Igutu (mixed blood of human and Neanthal); nobody in Arthdal is aware of that except San-ung, Eun-seom, Saya and Taealha.

=== Eun-seom and Saya ===
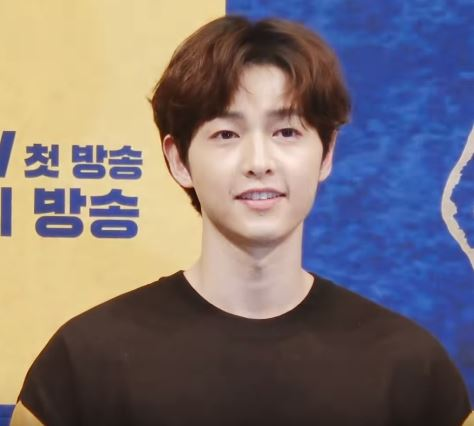
Song Joong-ki plays Eun-seom and Saya, identical twins

Eun-seom and Saya (Song Joong-ki in season 1 and Lee Joon-gi in season 2) are identical twins. Eun-seom is the son of Asa Hon and Neanthal, Ragaz. A member of the Wahan tribe of Iark, a foreigner to Arthdal. Ta-gon's most powerful enemy, in the days to come. The offspring of an alien relationship not accepted in Arthdal. Eun-seom and Saya are a mixed race of the Saram (human race) and the Neanthal, a pair of Igutus born during the Great War. An old Arthdal prophecy says that "the child born on the day when the blue comet appears will bring calamity." And so it is, on the day they were born, a bright blue streak lit across the sky. Eun-seom's mother, Asa Hon, willing to do anything to keep Eun-seom alive, escapes Arthdal and heads to Iark. But Asa Hon meets her death in the voyage to Iark.

Young Eun-seom was raised in the Wahan tribe of Iark. The Wahan got used to Eun-seom's dissimilar purple lips, and the scars on his back, but Eun-seom was more unique than just his appearance. He can copy any maneuver after seeing it just once, no matter how complicated. Thus, he was teaching Tan-ya the intricate dance of the Great Spiritual Mother, that she was supposed to be mastering. In addition, Eun-seom was a better hunter than his peers, as he is extraordinarily strong and fast. Although not comparable to the Neanthal, an average man cannot keep up with an Igutu's strength and speed. Eun-seom's abilities were strange to the Wahan. Despite being raised in Wahan, Eun-seom was still an outsider. His only confidant was Tan-ya, a Wahan girl of same age whom he grew up with. To Eun-seom, Tan-ya is his family who has been there for him since he was young and for whom he develops genuine romantic feelings. This is shown when he tries to kiss her as he is lovestruck by her during a festival . Tan-ya is a thoughtful girl who always took care of the lonely Eun-seom as she was his only friend. Eun-seom loves Tan-ya and eventually wants to win her over. Ultimately, Eun-seom's outstanding abilities and personality created a big problem, and Eun-seom is on the verge of banishment from Wahan. At the same time of Eun-seom's crisis, a danger also approaches the land of Iark. Following the orders of San-ung, the leader of the Arthdal Union, who wants to conquer Iark, Ta-gon and the Daekan troops descend the Great Black Cliff. The Wahan tribe were trounced. After his unsuccessful attempt to save Tanya, both Tan-ya and the Wahan are taken to Arthdal. To save them and his love Tanya, Eun-seom heads to Arthdal, the root of his secret.

Saya, on the other hand, Ragaz brought him along when he encountered Mubaek and his Saram soldiers. They fought and Ragaz died, killed by and arrow shot by Ta-gon. Ta-gon found Saya hidden in the bushes and he brought him home, giving him to Taealha to raise. Saya spent much of his life in the top most section of the Fortress of Fire. Saya's identity was revealed first time in the end of episode 6, season 1. He was shown to be manipulative and have a revenge streak, as he foiled Taealha's plan due to her part in the murder of the one he loved, Saenarae. After meeting Tanya he begins to like her. As his feelings grows towards Tanya he becomes jealous of her due to her feelings for Eunseom which leads to him being possessive and is determined to keep Tanya by his side.

=== Tan-ya ===
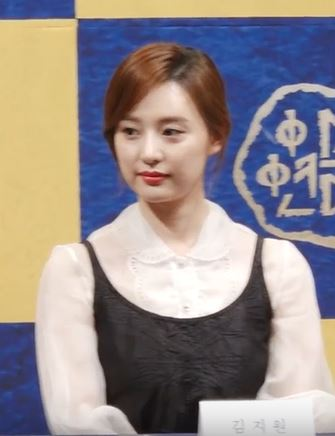
Kim Ji-won plays Tan-ya

Tan-ya (Kim Ji-won in season 1 and Shin Se-kyung in season 2) is the daughter of Yeol-son, the anointed successor of the next Great Spiritual Mother of the Wahan. The prophesied child of the blue comet. On the day that Tan-ya was born, her mother died before being able to meet her beloved daughter. Tan-ya was born on the same day as Eun-seom, the day the blue comet crossed the sky. But, the Wahan prophesy of the blue comet differed from that of the Arthdal: "The one who will break the shell will arrive on the day of the blue comet, accompanied by death. Wahan will ceased to be Wahan."

Tan-ya is a clever, pretty, bright Wahan girl, destined to be the next Great Spiritual Mother. In Iark, a land where the bow and arrow has not even been invented, she uses a sling as her hunting tool. She is a warrior capable of taking an adult's life. The Saram race cannot dream, but priestesses must be able to dream to qualify as a spiritual mother. In order to have dreams, Tan-ya is burdened with training and practice, but she has yet to meet a dream. Moreover, she has not been able to master the spiritual dance of generations of spiritual mothers. As Tan-ya becomes more frustrated and pressured, one day, Eun-seom secretly watches and learns the spiritual dance, and teaches Tan-ya. She finds out that Eun-seom has dreams, and at first, Tan-ya is suspicious. At the same time, she feels bad for herself because she is not having dreams. But without knowing, she begins to have feelings for Eun-seom which are later shown when she is separated from him.

The days were peaceful, until the Arthdal Daekan troops arrived in the Wahan Village. Tan-ya ends up being captured with the Wahan people due to her loyalty with her tribe, and taken to the faraway Arthdal land. Bit by bit, she feels her destiny and her anointed mission as the child of the blue comet approach her, along with the truth of the Wahan Tribe.

=== Taealha ===
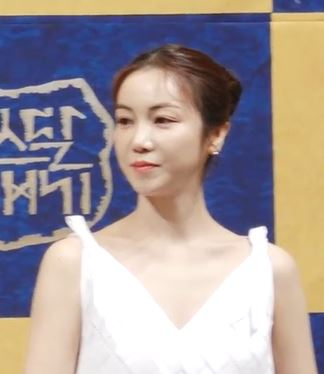
Kim Ok-vin plays Taealha

Taealha (Kim Ok-vin) is the daughter of the Hae Tribe Chief, Mi-hol. A scientist, warrior, and ambitious politician. The Hae people are foreigners to Arthdal who arrived from far far away, crossing the oceans. It has not been long since the Hae settled in Arthdal. The Hae chief, Mi-hol, used the exceptional technology of the Hae as a means to survive in Arthdal. As Mi-hol's daughter, Taealha realized at a young age, that if you do not become strong, you die. If you can not be a strong person, you must stand on the side of a strong person. Correct judgment about who is strong is the only thing that matters. This was carved deep into her heart. Descendants of the Hae are raised to be experts in various fields of science, and Taealha is no exception. But her interest is in power, not science. Rather than mastering the science, she would rather control the scientists. She believed that the one who could influence the people to lead the direction of history would be the person at the apex of power.

With insight and analytical power, Taealha predicts early on that Arthdal is on the verge of change. Although she did not experience it, she knows from history. The explosive growth of Arthdal's agriculture and production will ultimately lead to the birth of a nation. Believing that nations are born in the midst of clashing storms and desires, Taealha finds Ta-gon. And so, Ta-gon becomes the Hero of Arthdal. Everything seemed to follow Taealha's desires and plans. She enjoys great power as Ta-gon's political comrade. Taealha had no fears, Arthdal was as good as hers. However, a strong rival appears from an unexpected place.

== Recurring characters ==
=== Arthdal ===
==== Saenyeok Tribe and Daekan Forces ====
- San-ung (Kim Eui-sung) is Ta-gon's father, Chief of the Saenyeok Tribe. Leader of the Arthdal Tribal Union. The brave San-ung, who rose to the position of Arthdal Tribal Union Leader at a young age, has an ability to embrace and include others that made people want to follow him. He is intelligent and fair when solving problems. He achieved a triumphant victory in the Great War against the Neanthal, but the hero of this war was not him, but his son, Ta-gon. San-ung's jealousy towards his son was only a small inconvenience then. But when Ta-gon's eminence climbed to threaten his position as Tribal Union Leader, San-ung made a terrible determination in his heart.
- Moo-baek (Park Hae-joon) is an extremely skilled Daekan warrior, reputed to be the best. He is a highly efficient swordsman. Older brother of Mu-gwang, he is kind and compassionate. He wishes for peace and equality of all those in Arthdal.
- Dan-byeok (Park Byung-eun) is the son of San-ung, half brother of Ta-gon. The current general of Arthdal's guards force. Successor of the Chief of Saenyeok tribe. Dan-byeok was recognized as the successor of the Saenyeok Tribe Chief early on. Although Ta-gon was older, since no one knew who Ta-gon's mother was, Dan-byeok felt no need to be vigilant against him. He does not understand why his father was hateful towards Ta-gon and guarded against him from a young age. And so, he always felt sorry for Ta-gon and had much sympathy for him. With superior swordsmanship and physicality, his reputation amongst the Saenyeok and the Union Tribes was high.
- Gil-sun (Park Hyung-soo) is originally a member of the Daekan troops, he is currently a troop leader of the Guard Forces. Born of the White Mountain Tribe, after he fought alongside Ta-gon in the Great Hunt of Neanthal. He was the first to return to Arthdal, and is charged with keeping the peace within Arthdal as a member of the Guard Forces. A soldier who understands politics, he works under high-ranking leaders. He is quick to catch on to the interests at stake and changing political tides.
- Yeon-bal (Choi Young-joon) is a Daekan warrior. As a Saenyeok tribesman and out of loyalty to Ta-gon, he performs his tasks as ordered. With Moo-baek and Gil-son above him, and Mu-gwang, and Kitoha below him, he is often the one who is picked on and often feels unfairly treated. Free-spirited and friendly, he is clever unlike his appearance.
- Kitoha (Lee Ho-cheol) is a Daekan warrior from the White Mountain Tribe with good fighting skills and almost inhumanly powerful strength. He has a wild personality, and loves to drink and gamble, but unfitting to his appearance and abilities, he is very superstitious, even getting scared out of his wits at the slightest sign of misfortune.
- Mu-gwang (Hwang Hee) is a Daekan warrior, younger brother of Moo-baek. He performs cruel and dirty tasks with no moral consideration. If it's Ta-gon's orders, he obeys without remorse. He feels frustrated towards his older brother, Moo-baek, who cares not for power and is unwavering in his loyalty only towards the Union. He was most brutal in his treatment of the Iark people, killing them without hesitation.
- Yang-cha (Ki Do-hoon) is a Daekan warrior who is adept at using bronze weapons. He always wears a mask over his mouth, as he is serving a punishment of silence for something that happened in the past. Ta-gon gave young Yang-cha a secret order in the past. Ta-gon also reveals to Yang-cha his true feelings. Within the Daekan troops, he is reputed to be comparable to Moo-baek, seen as the best Warrior of the next generation.
- Park Ryang-poong (Song Yoo-taek) is a Daekan Warrior from a small minority tribe who was able to receive a leadership appointment. Unlike his appearances, he is intelligent and quick-witted, being able to accurately complete his given tasks.
- Dae-dae (Lee Hwang-eui) is the Chief historian of the Tribal Union Castle. The head of all the scribes who record the happenings in the castle, and an administrative officer. But Dae-dae's role doesn't just stop there, he serves at the side of the Union Tribe Leader. He passes no judgment on the tides of power, but is a scholar who pledges loyalty firmly to the Union itself.

==== White Mountain Tribe ====
- Asa Ron (Lee Do-kyung) is the Chief Elder of White Mountain Tribe, he controls the religious rites and ceremonies. As the Chief Elder who heads the Great Temple which serves the Eight Gods of Arthdal, he is at Arthdal's apex of power. However, Asa Ron has one thing lacking, he descends from only a branch house of the Great Mother Asa Shin, and not her direct line. He can communicate the wills of God, but he cannot meet the Gods himself. Thus, Asa Ron leads his clan not by the strength of his innate abilities, but by his outstanding political judgment.
- Asa Sakan (Son Sook) is a member of the Asa clan, the mother of White Mountain Tribe. The greatest Elder of the White Mountain Tribe who protects the sacred caves of White Mountain Tribe, who has the great influence to sway the decisions of the Great Temple. She believes it's her mission to protect the divine power of the Asa clan and the Arthdal Union.
- Asa Mot (Seo Eun-ah) is a member of the Asa clan, chief priestess, she orchestrates the rites and ceremonies of Arthdal under Asa Ron. She is also trusted by Asa Ron to manage the Great Temple. She believes that her body belongs to Airuzu, her heart to Isodunyong, she is unwavering in her faith and principles, an even more stout fundamentalist than Asa Ron.
- Asa Yon (Chang Ryul) is a priest of the Asa Clan, he originally served in the Sacred Caves of White Head Mountain, following Isodunyong. However, he was noticed by Asa Ron and was transferred to the Great Temple, becoming a priest who serves the Eight Gods. Intelligent and a realist at times he clashes with Asa Mot.
- Asa Moo (Park Ji-won) is the oracle of the Asa Clan who communicates the words of Isodunyeong. She always appears drunk, with a dazed appearance and slurred words. She dances inside the Great Temple and raises cries as she receives messages from the Gods.
- Asa Hon (Choo Ja-hyun) is a member of the Asa Clan, Eun-seom and Saya's mother. She was tasked to deliver gifts to the Neanthal, and at a burning Atturad, she witnessed the cruelty of the Saram race. After, she escaped with the Neanthal, Ragaz and giving him her heart, eventually conceiving Eun-seom and Saya. Being chased by the Daekan Troops, Asa Hon takes young Eunsom to the Great Black Cliff, attempting to head towards Iark.

==== Hae Tribe ====
- Hae Mi-hol (Jo Sung-ha) is the Chief of Hae tribe, Taealha's father. The master of Arthdal's science and information, the proprietor of the fortress of fire. Around 50 years ago, Mi-hol arrived in Arthdal as a young child. But he helped the adults of the Hae tribe to begin a large scale farming operation. He made bronze instruments, and brought upon abundance to Arthdal, allowing the Hae to reach their current status. Mihol observed the rapidly changing Arthdalian politics, while calculating his steps. He strategized and planned meticulously to ensure the Hae tribe's mission and survival. But the one thing that he did not account for was his daughter Taealha.
- Hae Tu-ak (Yoon Sa-bong) is a Hae warrior, Taealha's closest attendant. Although she appears gregarious and clumsy, she is Taealha's right-hand woman. Her appearance may suggest she's has a big body and moves dully, but she is a female warrior who is skilled in martial arts. Hae Tu-ak's appeal is that she will crush the arms of those who attack her while speaking innocent words through her mouth.
- Hae Yeo-bi (Park Sung-yeon) is Mi-hol's closest retainer who has devoted her life to the survival of the Hae Tribe. Under Mi-hol's direction, she currently closely monitors Taealha, who she raised with her own hands. With no emotion, she strictly reprimands and incenses Taealha. Skilled in martial arts, she at times clashes with Hae Tu-ak, who is her complete opposite.
- Hae Heul-lip (Bae Ki-beom) is a Hae Historian, Mi-hol's information gatherer. To him, Mi-hol's word is Law. Clever with an ability to act quickly, he holds Mi-hol's trust. He is entrusted with the task to record information on Arthdal and all the tribes on Arth Lands.
- Hae Al-yong is Hae tribe's Chief historian. He maintains the library of the Fortress of Fire, which holds 5,000 volumes of bamboo and leather books. Although only 5000, at that time, this is equivalent to all the books of the Arth Land and Aniachu land. Al-yong who maintains and publishes these books is called Al-yong the Sage by the people of the Arthdal Tribal Union.
- Hae Ga-eun is Hae tribe's agricultural technologist whose brain is so superior that she is knowledgeable of the species and breeds of all the plants.
- Hae Kka-dak (Lim Jin-woong) is Hae tribe's Bronze technologist. Although he usually is lazy and ignorant, he is the best bronze maker in all of Hae Tribe.
- Hae Ddae-mun is Hae Kka-dak's young son. Just by listening to them talk, you might get confused of who is the father and who is the son. He will snark you when you least expect it.

=== Bachi guild ===
- Ha-rim is Arthdal's medicine man. Born in the White Mountain Tribe, he is Arthdal's premier medicine man. Other than his technical skills in surgery, he can also recognize any medicinal herb at one glance. His outstanding medical skills contributed to bring Ta-gon's strategy to reality. If there was no Ha-rim, Arthdal would not have won the Great War against the Neanthal. He carries with him the burden of guilt, knowing that numerous Neanthal died in the Great War, and that Asa Hon who did not know of the conspiracy, has since gone missing, with no one knowing whether she's dead or alive.
- Chae-eun (Go Bo-gyeol in season 1 and Ha Seung-ri in season 2) is a medicine woman, Ha-rim's daughter, who naturally learned medicine by watching her father since she was young. Intelligent and bright, if the Union Tribes cannot find Ha-rim, they'll look for Chae-eun. Ha-rim finds much support from Chae-eun. She has no prejudice against the Neanthal or Igutus, and she helps Eun-seom when he arrives from Iark.
- Nun-byeol (Ahn Hye-won in season 1 and Lee Si-woo in season 2) is Chae-eun's little sister, Ha-rim's second daughter who he saved from the battlefields and raised as his own, actually an adopted war orphan, a Neanthal. Fearing for her naturally weak constitution as he cut most of her veins to make her weak so that no one notices her strong strength like of Neanthals, Ha-rim taught Nun-byeol sword fighting. She copies the movements, but has no strength behind them, and tires easily from even a little practice. For all her weakness, Nun-byeol has Chae-eun, her strong and clever sister who is her protector.
- Su-chin is a retainer of the medicine temple who was originally from a small minority tribe. He will follow any orders from Ha-rim and Chae-eun.
- Mu-Myung-jin is an artisan who works in the fabric-dye quarters, originally of the White Mountain Tribe.
- Ul-baek is the chief of the Bachi guild (merchant union), originally of the Saenyeok tribe, he has the most influence in the markets of Arthdal
- Turihan is a member of the Bachi guild who holds great pride in being from the White Mountain Tribe. He is a follower of the Asa Clan.
- Ra-im is a member of the Bachi guild who was not born on Arth continent, but takes great pride in being a part of the Arthdal Union.

=== Iark (Wahan Tribe) ===
- Yeol-son (Jung Suk-yong) is the Wahan Clan Chief, Tan-ya's father. He has crafty hands and uses them to skillfully make small sculptures, furniture, or weapons. His inventions are rare items that have never been seen by the surrounding clans, and are highly coveted in bartering. One day, the warriors of Arthdal arrived in Iark, and Yeolson was kidnapped to Arthdal. In Arthdal, where civilization is progressing, a handy, quick learner like Yeolson is valued. The innocent Yeolson adapts to the ways of a civilization, and plays an important part in the history of Arth.
- Cho-seol (Kim Ho-jung) is Wahan clan's Great Spiritual Mother, who is as a noble existence in the clan. She took Tan-ya, the child of the blue comet under her wing, as her next successor. As a priestess, she has felt that a tremendous change is upon the land of Iark and the Wahan Clan. She also guessed that Tan-ya will be the center of that change. She is always anxious that the unpredictable Eun-seom and Tan-ya share a close relationship. Looking back upon the forbidden rules of Wahan that were passed through generations of Wahan's Great Mothers, Eun-seom's existence is a danger to the Wahan Clan.
- Dal-sae (Shin Joo-hwan) is Wahan's greatest hunter and warrior, the successor of the Clan, but once he was kidnapped to Arthdal, that was quickly forgotten, and surviving was the only thing left in his mind. In Iark, Dal-sae was always picking on Eun-seom, as his rival, but becomes Eun-seom's closest comrade in the future.
- Moong-tae (Park Jin) is a Wahan warrior who has many fears, he makes many mistakes while hunting as he was born without agility. However, he bears great strength that it's hard to believe it belongs to a human. This strong but timid young man was quick to yield to the cruel military power of Arthdal.
- Teo-dae (Yang Kyung-won) is a pure and thick-skinned Wahan Warrior who is the next skilled hunter after Dal-sae amongst the Wahan.
- Book-soe (Kim Choong-gil) is a Wahan warrior who may look like he's the eldest brother, but he has the fragile heart of a child. He likes to eat, and when he was in Iark, he always had a piece of jerky in his mouth.
- Do-ti (Go Na-hee) is a Wahan child who survived the day of the Wahan tribe massacre. She goes with Eun-seom to Arthdal afterwards, and experiences a shocking world. Although she nags Eun-seom sassily, her existence itself gives strength to Eun-seom.
- Wooroomi (Kim Bi-bi) is Do-ti's mother, the best sling-shot in Wahan.

=== Neanthals ===
- Ragaz (Teo Yoo) is Eun-seom and Saya's father. Met Asa Hon for the first time at the peak of the White Mountain when the Union leaders tried to offer the Neanthals to join hands with them. Asa Hon was a translator for Sa-nung since she understood Neanthals language. They met again during the burning of the Atturad while Asa Hon was sent there and unknowingly used as a sacrificial victim by Union leader, Sa-nung to deliver gifts that purposely caused disease outbreak in the Neanthals. In rage, Ragaz intended to kill Asa Hon in the first place but unable to do so when suddenly he fell on his knees and threw up bloods. Asa Hon then knelt and apologized to him. At that point, Ragaz noticed Asa Hon's good intention when she was holding a Neanthal baby. She also suggested that they should save the remaining children of Neanthal. As the Great Hunt was still on going, Ragaz and Asa Hon tied knot and conceived twins, Saya and Eun-seom. He was the last adult Neanthal survivor from The Great Hunt. After hiding his eldest son behind a bush from the Daekan Troops, he fought and killed several Deakan warriors, almost killing the best Deakan warrior, Moo-baek in the process but died soon after being shot on his neck with an arrow by young Tagon. The last words he said before he died, he saw the Sarams will meet their doomsday by killing each other in his dream. However, they didn't understand his message.
- Raknrup (Moon Jong-won)
- Muteurubeu (Ok Go-won)
- Yiseuroobeu (Song Jong-ho)
- Rottip (Nichkhun)

=== Momo Tribe ===
- Karika (Erika Karata) is the Xabara (head) of the Momo Tribe.
- Tapien (Shim Eun-woo) is Sateunik's wife.

=== Doldambool ===
- Ipsaeng (Kim Sung-cheol)
- Badoru (Tae Won-seok)
- Sateunik (Jo Byeong-kyu)
- Chanaraki (Baek Seung-ik)
- Syoreujakin (Kim Do-Hyun)
- Koldu (Ryoo Sung-hyun)

== Guest characters ==
- Wabi tribe leader (Nash Ang)
- Kitoha (Choi Moo-sung)
- Saenarae (Jisoo)
- Black Tongue of Shaiti In (Song Geon-hee)
- Arok (Suho)
