= Our Blooming Youth =

2023 South Korean television series

- Promotional poster
- Hangul: 청춘월담
- Hanja: 靑春월담
- Lit.: A Tale of Youth
- RR: Cheongchunwoldam
- MR: Ch'ŏngch'unwŏldam
- Genre: Period drama; Romance; Mystery
- Based on: The Golden Hairpin by Ce Ce Qing Han
- Developed by: Studio Dragon (planning)
- Written by: Jung Hyeon-jeong
- Directed by: Lee Jong-jae
- Starring: Park Hyung-sik; Jeon So-nee; Pyo Ye-jin; Yoon Jong-seok; Lee Tae-sun
- Music by: Nam Hye-seung
- Country of origin: South Korea
- Original language: Korean
- No. of episodes: 20

Production
- Executive producer: Soo Jae-hyun
- Producers: Oh Seul-gi; Ji Yong-ho
- Running time: 70 minutes
- Production company: Story & Pictures Media

Original release
- Network: tvN
- Release: February 6 – April 11, 2023

Our Blooming Youth (Korean: 청춘월담) is a 2023 South Korean television series directed by Lee Jong-jae, and starring Park Hyung-sik, Jeon So-nee, Pyo Ye-jin, Yoon Jong-seok, and Lee Tae-sun, adapted from the 2015 Chinese novel The Golden Hairpin by Ce Ce Qing Han. It aired on tvN from February 6 to April 11, 2023, every Monday and Tuesday at 20:50 (KST). It is also available for streaming on Amazon Prime Video in Southeast Asia and Viki in all other regions.

== Synopsis ==
Crown Prince Lee Hwan, already under suspicion in the poisoning death of his older brother, receives a mysterious prophecy concerning his own death. He crosses paths with noblewoman Min Jae-yi, who is on the run after being framed for the murder of her family. They agree to help each other.

== Cast ==
=== Main ===
- Park Hyung-sik as Lee Hwan

A lonely crown prince who holds the secret of a mysterious curse.

- Jeon So-nee as Min Jae-yi

A genius girl who pursues the truth while being framed for the murder of her immediate family.

- Pyo Ye-jin as Jang Ga-ram

Min Jae-yi's only friend.

- Yoon Jong-seok as Han Seong-on

Lee Hwan's friend and Min Jae-yi's fiancée.

- Lee Tae-sun as Kim Myung-jin

A scholar who has studied in various fields of knowledge .

=== Supporting ===
==== People around Han Seong-on ====
- Jo Sung-ha as Left State Councillor Han Jung-eon

Left State Councillor and the head of the prestigious Yeongsan Han family.

==== People around Kim Myung-jin ====
- Son Byung-ho as Chief State Councillor Kim An-jik

Chief State Councillor who protects the neutrality of the court and stands firmly on the side of the Crown Prince in the palace.

- Kim Ki-doo as Man-dok

Bok-soo's husband who is the owner of a tavern together with his wife is known for their generosity.

- Lee Min-ji as Bok-soon

Man-dok's wife.

- Park Hyo-jun as Sam-chil

The owner of a building that renting Manyeondang to Myung-jin.

- Jung In-gyeom as Monk Mujin

Kim Myung-jin's teacher who has gray-haired long hair looks like a god, not a monk. Some people call him a taoist.

==== People in the Palace ====
- Heo Won-seo as Tae-gang / Tae-san

A silent escort who always follows Lee Hwan like a shadow.

- Choi Dae-chul as Eunuch So

Crown Prince's eunuch with the title of the senior 5th rank.

- Park Won-ho as Eunuch Cha

Crown Prince's eunuch.

- Oh Hee-joon as Eunuch Kim

Crown Prince's eunuch.

==== Royal Palace ====
- Lee Jong-hyuk as King

Lee Hwan's father and the ruler of Joseon.

- Hong Soo-hyun as Queen / Cho Soo-young (personal name)

The Queen and niece of Right State Councillor Cho Won-bo.

- Jung Woong-in as Right State Councillor Cho Won-bo

Right State Councillor and head of the Queen's family.

- Jung Da-eun as Princess Ha-yeon

The king's beloved daughter and younger sister of Lee Hwan.

- Im Han-bin as Grand Prince Myeongan

Lee Hwan's younger half-brother who was born as a child to Gye-bi and the King.

=== Others ===
- Lee Ha-yool as Crown Prince Uihyeon

The deceased crown prince who died three years ago.

- Seo Tae-hwa as Min Ho-seung

Min Jae-yi's deceased father.

- Jo Jae-ryong as Cho Won-oh

Cho Won-bo's cousin who is a criminal judge.

- Kim Tae-hyang as Yoon Seung-beom

A loyal butler of Han family.

- Yoon Ye-hee as Special Court Lady Kwon Deok-sim
- Son Kwang-eup as court official
- Park Seon-woo as Cho Eung-yoon
- Yoon Da-in as the Queen's butler

=== Special appearance ===
- Kim Woo-seok as Sim-yeong
- Jang Yeo-bin as the daughter of Lee Pan's family
- Lee Chae-kyung as shaman
- Yoon Seok-hyun as Song-ga
- Cha Seo-won as Jang-eui

== Original soundtrack ==
=== Part 1 ===
Released on February 14, 2023
No.	Title	Lyrics	Music	Artist	Length
1.	"In My Heart" (이 내 맘)	Nam Hye-seung; Janet Seo	Nam Hye-seung; Park Sang-hee	Cheeze	3:51
2.	"In My Heart" (이 내 맘; Inst.)		Nam Hye-seung; Park Sang-hee		3:51
Total length:					7:42

=== Part 2 ===
Released on February 28, 2023
No.	Title	Lyrics	Music	Artist	Length
1.	"Wind" (바람)	Nam Hye-seung; Park Jin-ho	Nam Hye-seung; Park Jin-ho	Jongho (Ateez)	4:23
2.	"Wind" (바람; Inst.)		Nam Hye-seung; Park Jin-ho		4:23
Total length:					8:46

== Viewership ==
Our Blooming Youth : South Korea viewers per episode (thousands)

Season	Episode number																				Average
Season	1	2	3	4	5	6	7	8	9	10	11	12	13	14	15	16	17	18	19	20	Average
1	852	797	786	755	769	701	694	722	640	697	791	806	787	787	812	693	785	741	743	1015	769

Source: Audience measurement performed nationwide by Nielsen Korea.

Average TV viewership ratings
Ep.	Original broadcast date	Average audience share (Nielsen Korea)	
Ep.	Original broadcast date	Nationwide	Seoul
1	February 6, 2023	4.219% (1st)	5.012% (1st)
2	February 7, 2023	3.572% (1st)	4.295% (1st)
3	February 13, 2023	3.717% (1st)	4.454% (1st)
4	February 14, 2023	3.619% (1st)	4.237% (1st)
5	February 20, 2023	3.556% (1st)	4.183% (1st)
6	February 21, 2023	3.374% (2nd)	3.696% (2nd)
7	February 27, 2023	3.356% (1st)	4.021% (1st)
8	February 28, 2023	3.607% (1st)	4.385% (1st)
9	March 6, 2023	3.287% (1st)	3.711% (1st)
10	March 7, 2023	3.413% (1st)	3.754% (1st)
11	March 13, 2023	3.598% (1st)	4.007% (1st)
12	March 14, 2023	3.651% (1st)	4.144% (1st)
13	March 20, 2023	3.789% (1st)	4.351% (1st)
14	March 21, 2023	3.825% (1st)	4.332% (1st)
15	March 27, 2023	3.785% (1st)	4.201% (1st)
16	March 28, 2023	3.242% (2nd)	3.436% (2nd)
17	April 3, 2023	3.869% (1st)	4.286% (1st)
18	April 4, 2023	3.830% (1st)	4.628% (1st)
19	April 10, 2023	3.740% (1st)	4.016% (1st)
20	April 11, 2023	4.877% (1st)	5.596% (1st)
Average		3.696%	4.237%
In the table above, the blue numbers represent the lowest ratings and the red numbers represent the highest ratings.; This series aired on a cable channel/pay TV which normally has a relatively smaller audience compared to free-to-air TV/public broadcasters (KBS, SBS, MBC and EBS).
