= Moon in the Day =

2023 South Korean television series

- Promotional poster
- Also known as: Moonrise During the Day
- Hangul: 낮에 뜨는 달
- Lit.: The Moon that Rises in the Day
- RR: Naje tteuneun dal
- MR: Naje ttŭnŭn tal
- Genre: Fantasy; Reincarnation; Romance
- Based on: The Moon that Rises in the Day by Heyum
- Written by: Kim Hye-won; Jung Seong-eun
- Directed by: Pyo Min-soo; Park Chan-yul
- Starring: Kim Young-dae; Pyo Ye-jin; On Joo-wan; Jung Woong-in; Lee Geung-young
- Music by: Gaemi
- Country of origin: South Korea
- Original language: Korean
- No. of episodes: 14

Production
- Running time: 60 minutes
- Production company: IWill Media

Original release
- Network: ENA
- Release: November 1 – December 14, 2023

Moon in the Day (Korean: 낮에 뜨는 달) is a 2023 South Korean television series starring Kim Young-dae, Pyo Ye-jin, On Joo-wan, Jung Woong-in, and Lee Geung-young. Based on a webtoon of the same Korean title, which was published on Naver, it depicts a thousand-year-long love story between a man and a woman. It aired on ENA from November 1 to December 14, 2023, every Wednesday and Thursday at 21:00 (KST). It is also available for streaming on U-Next in Japan, and on Viu and Viki in selected regions.

== Synopsis ==
The series tells the story of a man who is stuck in time after being killed by his lover, and a woman who has no memories of her past life and experiences time continuously.

== Cast ==
=== Main ===
- Kim Young-dae as Han Jun-oh / Do-ha
1. Han Jun-oh: a well-known top star who suffers from insecurity.
2. Do-ha: an elite aristocrat from Silla, who was killed by his lover. With his soul still lingering in the mortal realm, he seeks revenge by possessing the body of Jun-oh.
- Pyo Ye-jin as Kang Young-hwa / Han Ri-ta
1. Kang Young-hwa: a firefighter-turned-bodyguard.
2. Han Ri-ta: the sole survivor of a noble family from Daegaya, who lost her loved ones to Do-ha, leading to her seeking revenge and finally killing Do-ha after pretending to be his lover.
- On Joo-wan as Han Min-oh

Jun-oh's older brother who is the CEO of his agency Beginning Entertainment.

- Jung Woong-in as Seok Chul-hwan

The former CEO of Beginning Entertainment who loses his company to Min-oh and becomes homeless.

- Lee Geung-young So Ri-bu

Do-ha's adoptive father.

=== Supporting ===
- Jung Shin-hye as Jung Yi-seul

Jun-oh's ex-girlfriend.

- Kim Dong-young as Jang Yoon-je

Jun-oh's manager.

- Moon Ye-won as Choi Na-yeon

Young-hwa's roommate.

- Lee Jun-hyeok as Go Kyung-se

A lawyer.

- Shin Yu-ro as Monk Hae-in

The person who gave his self-defense device to Young-hwa when she was young.

- Lee Young-seok as the chief monk of a small hermitage in Samgak-san
- Kim Jung-heon as Gu Tae-joo

A top star and Jun-oh's rival.

- Choi Jae-won as Director Kim

=== Special appearance ===
- Ahn Gil-kang as General Gaya

== Production and release ==
Filming of the series began in April 2023.

Moon in the Day was initially scheduled to premiere on October 25, 2023, but was pushed back to November 1.

== Viewership ==
Moon in the Day : South Korea viewers per episode (thousands)

Season	Episode number														Average
Season	1	2	3	4	5	6	7	8	9	10	11	12	13	14	Average
1	381	357	448	342	393	343	372	404	388	347	357	374	325	N/A	372

Source: Audience measurement performed nationwide by Nielsen Korea. (Note: The average rating and viewership was calculated based on the published data. The exact average rating and viewership are unknown due to the missing rating and viewership for one episode.)

Average TV viewership ratings
Ep.	Original broadcast date	Average audience share (Nielsen Korea)	
Ep.	Original broadcast date	Nationwide	Seoul
1	November 1, 2023	1.581% (4th)	1.320% (6th)
2	November 2, 2023	1.625% (4th)	1.498% (4th)
3	November 8, 2023	1.974% (3rd)	2.056% (4th)
4	November 9, 2023	1.530% (3rd)	1.383% (5th)
5	November 15, 2023	1.510% (5th)	1.404% (6th)
6	November 16, 2023	1.356% (5th)	1.168% (6th)
7	November 22, 2023	1.506% (4th)	1.732% (4th)
8	November 23, 2023	1.541% (4th)	1.547% (5th)
9	November 29, 2023	1.666% (4th)	1.834% (5th)
10	November 30, 2023	1.623% (4th)	1.396% (6th)
11	December 6, 2023	1.757% (3rd)	2.177% (4th)
12	December 7, 2023	1.622% (4th)	1.418% (5th)
13	December 13, 2023	1.463% (5th)	1.600% (6th)
14	December 14, 2023	1.935% (3rd)	N/A
Average		1.621%	1.579%
In the table above, the blue numbers represent the lowest ratings and the red numbers represent the highest ratings.; N/A denotes ratings that were not published.; This series aired on a cable channel/pay TV which normally has a relatively smaller audience compared to free-to-air TV/public broadcasters (KBS, SBS, MBC and EBS).
