= Second to Last Love (South Korean TV series) =

2016 South Korean television series

- Promotional poster
- Also known as: The Second Last Love; My Second Last Love
- Genre: Romance
- Based on: Saigo Kara Nibanme no Koi by Yoshikazu Okada
- Written by: Choi Yoon-jeong
- Directed by: Choi Young-hoon
- Starring: Kim Hee-ae; Ji Jin-hee; Kwak Si-yang
- Country of origin: South Korea
- Original language: Korean
- No. of episodes: 20

Production
- Executive producer: Lee Yong-seok
- Producer: Lee Gwang-soon
- Cinematography: Seo Deuk-won; Park Sung-jin
- Editors: Park In-cheol; Shin Sook
- Running time: 70 minutes
- Production companies: Salt Light Media; Linus Pictures

Original release
- Network: SBS
- Release: July 30 – October 16, 2016

Second to Last Love (Korean: 끝에서 두번째 사랑; RR: Kkeuteseo dubeonjjae sarang) is a South Korean television series starring Kim Hee-ae, Ji Jin-hee and Kwak Si-yang. It is a Korean drama remake of the Japanese television drama series Saigo Kara Nibanme no Koi. It replaced Beautiful Gong Shim and aired on SBS on Saturdays and Sundays at 22:00 (KST) for 20 episodes from July 30 to October 16, 2016.

== Cast ==
=== Main cast ===
- Kim Hee-ae as Kang Min-joo

A 46-year-old woman, she is a SBC Broadcasting's executive producer and the leader of drama division's team 1.

- Ji Jin-hee as Go Sang-sik

A 46-year-old man, he is a grade 5 official and the head of Woori City Hall's regional tourism section.

- Kwak Si-yang as Park Joon-woo

A 35-year-old man, he is the owner of healing cafe "Rest".

=== Go Sang-sik's family ===
- Kim Seul-gi as Go Mi-rye

A 35-year-old woman, she is Sang-sik youngest sister and an unknown webtoon writer.

- Jung Soo-young as Go Sang-hee

A 42-year-old woman, she is Sang-sik's first younger sister and Cheon-soo's wife.

- Lee Soo-min as Go Ye-ji

A 15-year-old girl, she is Sang-sik's only daughter.

- Lee Hyung-chul as Park Cheon-soo

A 45-year-old man, he is Sang-sik's brother-in-law, Sang-hee's husband and a middle school's math teacher.

- Hong Tae-eui as Park Hoon

An 18-year-old boy, he is Sang-sik's nephew, Sang-hee and Cheon-soo's only son.

- Sung Ji-ru as Dok Go-bong

A 62-year-old man, he is owner of the bar where Sang-sik is a customer.

- Stephanie Lee as Min Ji-seon

A 29-year-old woman, she is a Canadian-born Korean model.

=== Kang Min-joo's friends ===
- Kim Na-young as Shin Ae-kyung

A 46-year-old woman, she is Min-joo's friend and a 2nd year divorced woman.

- Seo Jeong-yeon as Goo Tae-yeon

A 46-year-old woman, she is Min-joo's friend, a single lady, and a writing teacher.

=== People of Woori City Hall ===
- Moon Hee-kyung as Na Choon-woo

A 55-year-old woman, she is the Deputy Mayor.

- Kim Kwon as Cha Soo-hyuk

A 35-year-old man, he is a grade 7 official and a competent of the regional tourism section.

- Go Bo-gyeol as Han Song-yi

A 28-year-old woman, she is a female contract employee of the regional tourism section.

- Do Gi-seok as Shin Seok-gi

A 43-year-old man, he is the Economic and Cultural director.

=== SBC Broadcasting Bureau ===
- Park Sung-geun as Han Jeong-sik

A 49-year-old man, he is an executive producer and the leader of drama division's team 2.

- Yang Hyung-wook as Gook Young-soo

A 52-year-old man, he is the head of drama division.

- Lee Hye-eun as Oh Young-ae

A 43-year-old woman, she is the production PD of drama division and Min-joo's right arm.

- Jang Seok-hyun as Nam Gi-cheol

A 35-year-old man, he is a 5th year assistant director and Min-joo's left arm

- Han Soo-jin as Na Ae-ri

A 33-year-old woman, she is a new drama writer.

- Kim Dong-gyun as PD

=== Extended cast ===
- Jung Yoo-an as Kim Hyun-seok
- Ho Hyo-hoon
- Seo Yang-won
- Kwon Eun-soo as Miss Kim
- Lee Eun-hyung
- Kang Jae-joon
- Choi Yoon-joon
- Jung Young-joo as writer Hwang
- Jung Hyun-seok
- Lee Hyun-jin as Jang Eun-ho
- Lee Jeong-sung as teacher Ma
- In Sung-ho
- Jeon Heon-tae
- Han So-young as Na Joo-yeon
- Bang Eun-hee
- Kang Dong-yeop

=== Cameo appearances ===
- Go Doo-shim as Kang Min-joo's mother
- Yoon Joo-sang as Kang Min-joo's father

== Ratings ==
In the table below, the blue numbers represent the lowest ratings and the red numbers represent the highest ratings.

Ep.	Original broadcast date	Average audience share			
Ep.	Original broadcast date	TNmS		AGB Nielsen Ratings	
Ep.	Original broadcast date	Nationwide	Seoul	Nationwide	Seoul
1	July 30, 2016	7.5%	9.1%	8.7%	10.4%
2	July 31, 2016	8.3%	9.8%	9.3%	10.9%
3	August 7, 2016	8.3%	9.0%	9.9%	11.1%
4	August 14, 2016	8.9%	9.2%	11.8%	12.8%
5	August 21, 2016	7.8%	8.5%	8.4%	9.5%
6	August 27, 2016	6.7%	7.3%	7.8%	8.9%
7	August 28, 2016	8.0%	8.7%	8.9%	9.9%
8	September 3, 2016	6.3%	6.7%	7.9%	9.3%
9	September 4, 2016	7.6%	9.4%	8.1%	8.9%
10	September 10, 2016	6.7%	7.3%	8.1%	9.5%
11	September 11, 2016	6.8%	6.8%	9.0%	10.1%
12	September 24, 2016	5.9%	6.8%	7.5%	8.0%
13	September 25, 2016	5.9%	6.7%	8.2%	8.5%
14	October 1, 2016	6.5%	7.8%	7.2%	8.2%
15	October 2, 2016	7.1%	8.1%	7.4%	8.0%
16	October 8, 2016	5.8%	6.1%	7.3%	8.3%
17	October 9, 2016	6.8%	7.7%	7.8%	8.6%
18	October 15, 2016	5.5%	6.6%	7.2%	8.2%
19	October 15, 2016	5.6%	6.4%	6.4%	7.1%
20	October 16, 2016	7.0%	8.2%	8.4%	9.6%
Average		6.95%	7.81%	8.27%	9.29%

=== Notes ===
- Episode 3 wasn't aired on Saturday August 6 due to broadcast of the 2016 Summer Olympics in Rio de Janeiro, Brazil. This episode was aired on Sunday August 7, 2016.
- Episode 4 wasn't aired on Saturday August 13 due to broadcast of the 2016 Summer Olympics in Rio de Janeiro, Brazil. This episode was aired on Sunday August 14, 2016.
- Episode 5 wasn't aired on Saturday August 20 due to broadcast of the 2016 Summer Olympics in Rio de Janeiro, Brazil. This episode was aired on Sunday August 21, 2016.
- Episode 12 wasn't aired on September 17 and 18 due to broadcast of Assassination and The Beauty Inside in the SBS's Chuseok programs. This episode was aired on Saturday September 24, 2016.
- Two episodes 18 and 19 were aired consecutively on Saturday October 15.

== Original soundtrack ==
Second to Last Love Original Soundtrack

Soundtrack album by Various Artists
- Genre: Soundtrack, Ballad, Pop
- Label: Donuts Culture, KT Music

=== Part 1 ===
No.	Title	Artist	Length
1.	"Summer Picnic (쉼표)"	Bae Soo-jeong (배수정)	3:52
2.	"Summer Picnic (쉼표)" (English Ver.)	Bae Soo-jeong (배수정)	3:52
3.	"Summer Picnic (쉼표)" (Inst.)		3:52
Total length:			11:36

=== Part 2 ===
No.	Title	Artist	Length
1.	"Clean (오늘도 맑음)"	Ryu Su-jeong and Baby Soul (Lovelyz)	3:19
2.	"Clean (오늘도 맑음)" (Inst.)		3:19
Total length:			6:38

=== Part 3 ===
No.	Title	Artist	Length
1.	"My Window"	Riot Kidz	3:23
2.	"My Window" (Inst.)		3:23
Total length:			6:46

=== Part 4 ===
No.	Title	Artist	Length
1.	"Heart to Heart"	Jisun (Loveholics)	3:48
2.	"Heart to Heart" (Inst.)		3:48
Total length:			7:36

=== Part 5 ===
No.	Title	Artist	Length
1.	"Meaning of You (그대가 내게)"	Hong Dae-kwang	3:17
2.	"Meaning of You (그대가 내게)" (Inst.)		3:17
Total length:			6:34

=== Part 6 ===
No.	Title	Artist	Length
1.	"My All"	Ben	3:52
2.	"My All" (Inst.)		3:52
Total length:			7:44

=== Part 7 ===
No.	Title	Artist	Length
1.	"Do You Know (알고 있나요)"	Gemini (제미니)	3:47
2.	"Do You Know (알고 있나요)" (Inst.)		3:47
Total length:			7:34

== Awards and nominations ==
Year	Award	Category	Recipient	Result
2016	5th APAN Star Awards	Best New Actor	Kwak Si-yang	Nominated
2016	SBS Drama Awards	Top Excellence Award, Actress in a Romantic-Comedy Drama	Kim Hee-ae	Nominated
2016	SBS Drama Awards	Excellence Award, Actor in a Romantic-Comedy Drama	Ji Jin-hee	Nominated
2016	SBS Drama Awards	Excellence Award, Actress in a Romantic-Comedy Drama	Kim Seul-gi	Nominated
2016	SBS Drama Awards	Special Award, Actor in a Romantic-Comedy Drama	Sung Ji-ru	Nominated
2016	SBS Drama Awards	Special Award, Actress in a Romantic-Comedy Drama	Jung Soo-young	Nominated
2016	SBS Drama Awards	New Star Award	Kwak Si-yang	Won
