= Pyo Ye-jin =

South Korean actress (born 1992)

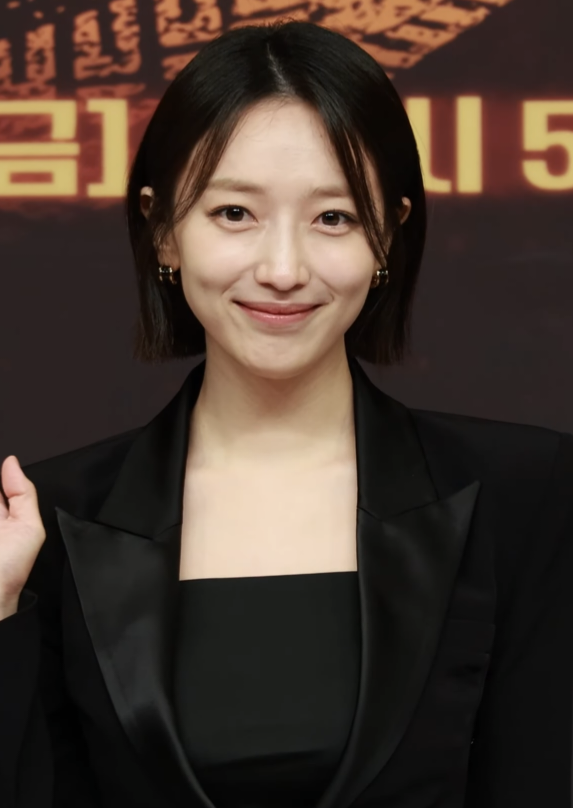
- Pyo in November 2025
- Born: February 3, 1992 (age 34); Changwon, South Korea
- Education: Baekseok Arts University (Aviation)
- Occupation: Actress
- Years active: 2012–present
- Agent: Secret

Korean name
- Hangul: 표예진
- RR: Pyo Yejin
- MR: P'yo Yejin

Pyo Ye-jin (Korean: 표예진; born February 3, 1992) is a South Korean actress. She began her career in supporting roles in television dramas and films, and gained recognition for her antagonist role in 2019 SBS mystery melodrama VIP, securing the Best Character Award at the 2019 SBS Drama Awards. Subsequently, Pyo took a hacker role in both seasons of the highly-rated SBS revenge action series Taxi Driver, and later starred in the television dramas Our Blooming Youth and Moon in the Day.

== Career ==
Pyo Ye-jin worked as a flight attendant from 2011 to 2013 at Korean Air before she left to pursue an acting career. She then enrolled as a trainee actress in JYP Entertainment until 2015.

Pyo began to get bigger roles from 2016 to 2017 after she signed to agency Pan Stars Company, with some of the standout works being 2016's TV ratings-guarantee family weekend The Gentlemen of Wolgyesu Tailor Shop on KBS2, and her first lead role in the 2017 daily drama Love Returns on KBS1.

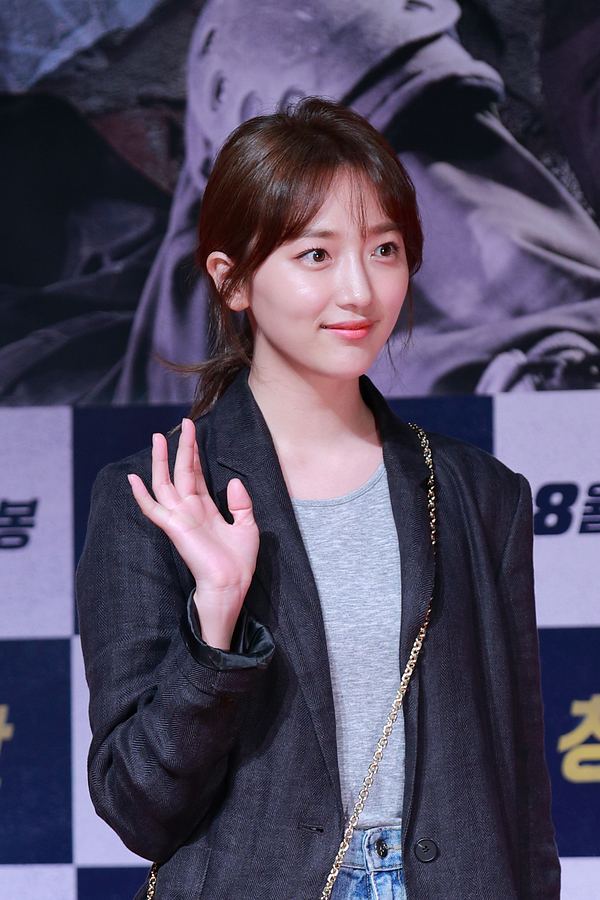
Pyo in August 2017

From 2018 onwards, Pyo has accumulated more notable roles. She won Popular Character Award at the 11th Korea Drama Awards for her role as an enthusiastic rookie secretary in tvN's rom-com workplace What's Wrong with Secretary Kim in 2018. With SBS mystery melodrama VIP, Pyo won Best Character Award at the 2019 SBS Drama Awards for her portrayal of a new employee in the VIP team of a luxurious department store.

Pyo then acted in the SBS highly-rated revenge action Taxi Driver and its sequel, as the vigilante team's IT analyst and youngest member.

In January 2023, Pyo signed with Secret Entertainment. She appeared on two series that year: tvN's historical mystery Our Blooming Youth, and ENA's fantasy drama Moon in the Day, which was her first female lead role in a weekly miniseries.

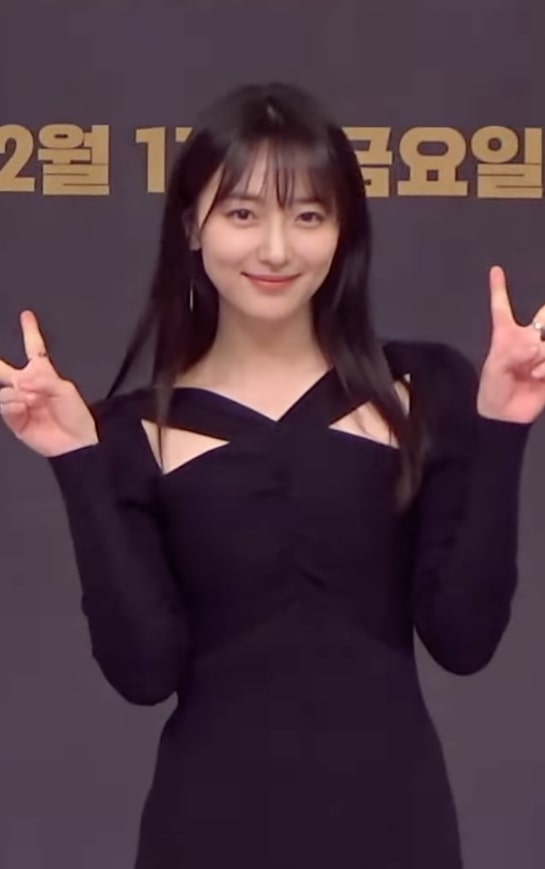
Pyo in 2023

In October 2024, she was cast as Ji Chang-wook's love interest in Disney+ series The Manipulated.

== Filmography ==
=== Film ===
Year	Title	Role	Notes	Ref.
2014	Miss Granny	Music show MC	Cameo	
2020	Shiho	Shi Ah		
2021	Unframed – Blue happiness		Special appearance, Watcha's short film	

=== Television series ===
Year	Title	Role	Notes	Ref.
2012	Here Comes Mr. Oh			
2016	Marriage Contract	Hyun A-ra		
2016	The Doctors	Hyun Soo-jin		
2016	The Gentlemen of Wolgyesu Tailor Shop	Kim Jung		
2017	Fight for My Way	Jang Ye-jin		
2017	While You Were Sleeping	Cha Yeo-jung		
2017	Love Returns	Gil Eun-jo		
2018	What's Wrong with Secretary Kim	Kim Ji-a		
2019	Hotel del Luna	Actress	Cameo (ep. 6)	
2019	VIP	On Yoo-ri / Ha Yoo-ri		
2021–present	Taxi Driver	Ahn Go-eun	Seasons 1–3	
2023	Our Blooming Youth	Jang Ga-ram		
2023	Revenant	Influencer	Cameo (ep. 6)	
2023	Moon in the Day	Kang Young-hwa / Han Ri-ta		
2026	Filing for Love	Yeon So-young	Special appearances	

=== Web series ===
Year	Title	Role	Notes	Ref.
2015	Dream Knight		Cameo (eps. 5 and 12)	
2016	Deux Yeoza	Woman 2		
2016	72 Seconds 2	Girl	Cameo (ep. 7)	
2016	72 Seconds 3	Waitress	Cameo (ep. 7)	
2021	Lovestruck in the City	Yoon Seon-a	Cameo (eps. 11–12)	
2024	Dreaming of a Freaking Fairy Tale	Shin Jae-rim		
2025	The Manipulated	Song Su-ji	Special appearances	

== Discography ==
=== Soundtrack appearances ===
Title	Year	Peak chart positions	Album
Title	Year	KOR Gaon	Album
"A Walk" (산책)	2021	— (Note: "A Walk" didn't enter Gaon Digital Chart, but peaked at position 95 on the Gaon Download Chart and position 61 on the Gaon BGM Chart.)	Taxi Driver OST Part 3
"—" denotes a recording that did not chart

== Awards and nominations ==
Name of the award ceremony, year presented, category, nominee of the award, and the result of the nomination
Award ceremony	Year	Category	Nominee / Work	Result	Ref.
Asia Model Awards	2017	New Star Awards	Pyo Ye-jin	Won	
Brand of the Year Awards	2021	Rising Star Actress	Pyo Ye-jin	Nominated	
KBS Drama Awards	2017	Best New Actress	Fight for My Way and Love Returns	Nominated	
Korea Drama Awards	2018	Popular Character Award – Female	What's Wrong with Secretary Kim	Won	
Korea Cultural Entertainment Awards	2016	Best New actress (TV)	The Gentlemen of Wolgyesu Tailor Shop	Won	
SBS Drama Awards	2019	Best Character Award (Actress)	VIP	Won	
SBS Drama Awards	2021	Excellence Award for an Actress in a Mini-Series Genre/Fantasy Drama	Taxi Driver	Nominated	
SBS Drama Awards	2023	Excellence Award, Actress in a Seasonal Drama	Taxi Driver 2	Won	
SBS Drama Awards	2025	Excellence Award, Actress in a Miniseries Genre/Action Drama	Taxi Driver 3	Won	
Seoul International Drama Awards	2021	Excellent Korean Drama OST	"A Walk" (산책)	Nominated	
