= Kwak Si-yang =

South Korean actor (born 1987)

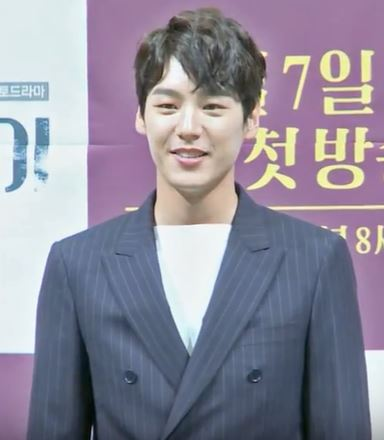
- Kwak in April 2017
- Born: Kwak Myeong-jin; January 15, 1987 (age 39); Seoul, South Korea
- Education: Dankook University – Environmental and civil engineering
- Occupation: Actor
- Years active: 2014–present
- Agent: Drawing Entertainment

Korean name
- Hangul: 곽명진
- RR: Gwak Myeongjin
- MR: Kwak Myŏngjin

Stage name
- Hangul: 곽시양
- RR: Gwak Siyang
- MR: Kwak Siyang

Kwak Si-yang (Korean: 곽시양; born January 15, 1987), birth name Kwak Myeong-jin (곽명진), is a South Korean actor.

== Career ==
Kwak debuted as an actor in the 2014 drama Glorious Day. His first major role was the film 2014 Night Flight. He then appeared in the music drama, Persevere, Goo Hae-ra.

On October 1, 2015, Starhaus Entertainment launched the project group One O One, releasing their debut single "Love You". The group consists of Kwak along with fellow Starhaus actors Ahn Hyo-seop, Song Won-seok and Kwon Do-kyun.

Kwak gained popularity after starring in the hit romantic comedy drama Oh My Ghost, portraying a chef who appears stand-offish but is kind and sweet. He then starred in daily drama All is Well, and joined the reality show We Got Married where he was paired with actress Kim So-yeon.

In 2016, Kwak starred in his first historical drama Mirror of the Witch. He received his first major role in SBS's 2016 drama Second to Last Love, which won him the New Star Award at SBS Drama Awards.

In 2017, he starred in tvN's fantasy-romance drama Chicago Typewriter as Yoo Ah-in's rival. He also made a special appearance in KBS' romantic comedy drama Fight for My Way.

In 2018, Kwak appeared in the thriller film The Witness, and also in the romance thriller drama Four Men, a prequel to the 2017's Man to Man.

In 2019, Kwak starred in the war film The Battle of Jangsari. In 2020, he joined the SBS sci-fi drama Alice as time traveler Yu Min-hyuk.

In 2021, Kwak starred in the SBS historical-fantasy drama Lovers of the Red Sky. The same year he joined the JTBC drama Idol: The Coup. Later in September 2021, Kwak signed a contract with Drawing Entertainment after his contract with the previous agency has ended.

In 2022, he played the role of barista Gong Soo-cheol in the KBS2 drama Café Minamdang.

== Personal life ==
On September 20, 2023, it was confirmed that Kwak is in a relationship with actress Lim Hyeon-joo. In November 2024, both their agencies confirmed their breakup.

On September 3, 2026, Kwak's agency 9ATO Entertainment confirmed that he and Yoo Ji-ae, formerly of girl group Lovelyz, will get married on November 28.

== Filmography ==
=== Film ===
Year	Title	Role	Ref.
2014	Night Flight	Yong-joo	
2016	Sori: Voice From The Heart	Hyun-soo	
2016	Elephant in the Room	Lee Jae-won	
2016	Familyhood	Kang Ji-hoon	
2018	The Witness	Tae-ho	
2019	The Battle of Jangsari	Park Chan-nyun	
2024	The Desperate Chase	Jo Soo-kwang	
2024	You'll Die in 6 Hours	Ki-hoon	
2026	Three Evil Islands	Ryuhei Matsuda	

=== Television series ===
Year	Title	Role	Notes	Ref.
2014	Glorious Day	Jung Hee-joo		
2015	Persevere, Goo Hae-ra	Kang Se-jong		
2015	Oh My Ghost	Seo-joon		
2015	All is Well	Kang Gi-chan		
2016	One More Happy Ending	Divorced man	Cameo (Episode 1)	
2016	Secret Healer	Poong-yeon		
2016	Second to Last Love	Park Joon-woo		
2017	Three Color Fantasy - Queen of the Ring	Professional model	Cameo (Episode 5)	
2017	Chicago Typewriter	Baek Tae-min / Heo Young-min		
2017	Fight for My Way	Kim Nam-il	Cameo (Episode 11–16)	
2019	Welcome 2 Life	Goo Dong-tae		
2020	Alice	Yoo Min-hyuk		
2021	Lovers of the Red Sky	Prince Juhyang (Yi Hu)		
2021	Idol: The Coup	Cha Jae-hyuk		
2022	Café Minamdang	Gong Soo-cheol		
2024	Flex X Cop	Jin Seung-ju		
2024	Good Partner	Chun Hwan-Seo	(Episode 12-13)	
2025	Love Scout	Min Jeong-hyuk	Cameo (Episode 9)	
2025	My Dearest Nemesis	Kim Shin-won		
2025	The Divorce Insurance	Shin Hyun-jae	Cameo (Episode 5-6)	
2026	A Love Other Than Yours	Seo Jae-hyuk		

=== Web series ===
Year	Title	Role	Notes	Ref.
2016	Strange Visitor	Himself		
2017	2TV Snack	Himself		
2021	Genesis	Choi Jin-soo		
2022	Rookie Cops	Kim Hyun-soo	Special appearance	

=== Television shows ===
Year	Title	Role	Notes	Ref.
2015–2016	We Got Married – Season 4	Cast Member	with Kim So-yeon (Episode 287–316)	
2017	Lost Time	Host		
2017	Law of the Jungle in Sumatra	Cast member	Episodes 256–261	
2018	Sea Police	Cast member		
2021–2022	My Little Old Boy	Special member	Episode 266–285	

=== Music video appearances ===
Year	Title	Artist	Role	Ref.
2009	"You and I"	Park Bom	Sick Boyfriend	

== Discography ==
=== Soundtrack appearances ===
Title	Year	Album
"Do You Know?" (with Yoo Sung-eun)	2015	Persevere, Goo Hae-ra OST
"Bus Stop" (with Jinyoung of B1A4)	2015	Persevere, Goo Hae-ra OST
"Love You"	2015	101 (One o One) OST
"Stunning"	2015	101 (One o One) OST
"You Are My Light"	2016	101 (One o One) OST

== Awards and nominations ==
Name of the award ceremony, year presented, category, nominee of the award, and the result of the nomination
Award ceremony	Year	Category	Nominee / Work	Result	Ref.
APAN Star Awards	2016	Best New Actor	Second to Last Love	Nominated	
Asia Artist Awards	2016	New Actor Award	Kwak Si-yang	Won	
Asia Artist Awards	2018	Choice Award	Kwak Si-yang	Won	
Asia Model Awards	2016	New Star Award (Actor)	Kwak Si-yang	Won	
MBC Drama Awards	2019	Excellence Award, Actor in a Monday-Tuesday Miniseries	Welcome 2 Life	Nominated	
MBC Entertainment Awards	2015	New Star Awards	We Got Married - Season 4	Won	
MBC Entertainment Awards	2015	Best Couple Award	Kwak Si-yang with Kim So-yeon; We Got Married - Season 4	Nominated	
KBS Drama Awards	2015	Excellence Award, Actor in a Daily Drama	All is Well	Won	
KBS Drama Awards	2015	Netizen Award, Actor	All is Well	Nominated	
KBS Drama Awards	2022	Best Supporting Actor	Café Minamdang	Nominated	
SBS Drama Awards	2016	New Star Award	Second to Last Love	Won	
SBS Drama Awards	2020	Excellence Award, Actor in a Miniseries Fantasy / Romance Drama	Alice	Nominated	
SBS Drama Awards	2021	Best Character Award, Actor	Lovers of the Red Sky	Won	
Wildflower Film Awards	2015	Best New Actor	Night Flight	Nominated	
