= In Still Green Days =

2015 South Korean television series

- Promotional poster
- Hangul: 그래도 푸르른 날에
- RR: Geuraedo pureureun nare
- MR: Kŭraedo p'urŭrŭn nare
- Genre: Period drama; Romance; Family
- Written by: Kim Ji-soo; Park Chul
- Directed by: Eo Soo-sun; Jeon Chang-gun
- Creative director: Hong Eun-mi
- Starring: Song Ha-yoon; Lee Hae-woo; Jung Yi-yeon; Kim Min-soo
- Country of origin: South Korea
- Original language: Korean
- No. of episodes: 129

Production
- Executive producer: Lee Jae-young
- Producer: Kim Won-yong
- Running time: 40 min
- Production company: KBS Drama Production

Original release
- Network: KBS2
- Release: March 2 – August 28, 2015

In Still Green Days (Korean: 그래도 푸르른 날에) is a 2015 South Korea morning soap opera starring Song Ha-yoon, Lee Hae-woo, Jung Yi-yeon, and Kim Min-soo. It aired on KBS2 from March 2, 2015, to August 28, 2015, on Mondays to Fridays at 09:00 (KST) to 09:45 (KST).

It is the 38th TV Novel series (7th in 2010s) of KBS.

== Summary ==
This coming-of-age drama is set in the 1970s.

== Cast ==
=== Main ===
- Song Ha-yoon as Lee Young-hee
- Lee Hae-woo as Seo In-ho
- Jung Yi-yeon as Lee Jung-hee / Jang En-ah
- Kim Min-soo as Park Dong-soo

=== Supporting ===
==== People around Young-hee ====
- Park Hyun-suk as Choi Myung-joo
- Oh Mi-yeon as Kim Min-ja
- Kim Yong-seok as Lee Sang-goo
- Yoo Hyun-joo as Lee Mi-jung
- Choi Chang-yeop as Lee Jung-hoon
- Kim Woo-seok as Lee Young-hoon

==== People around In-ho ====
- Choi Dong-yeop as Seo Byung-jin
- Park So-jung as Kang Mi-sun
- Hung Ye-eun as Seo Hye-young

==== People around En-ah ====
- Yoon Hae-young as Jung Deok-hee
- Kim Myung-soo as Jang Yong-taek
- Song Tae-won as Jang Seok-beom

=== Others ===
- Kim Do-yeon as Hyang-sook
- Lee Myung-hoon as Yoo Sang-min
- Song Tae-yoon as Dongha High student #1
