= Song Ha-yoon =

South Korean actress (born 1986)

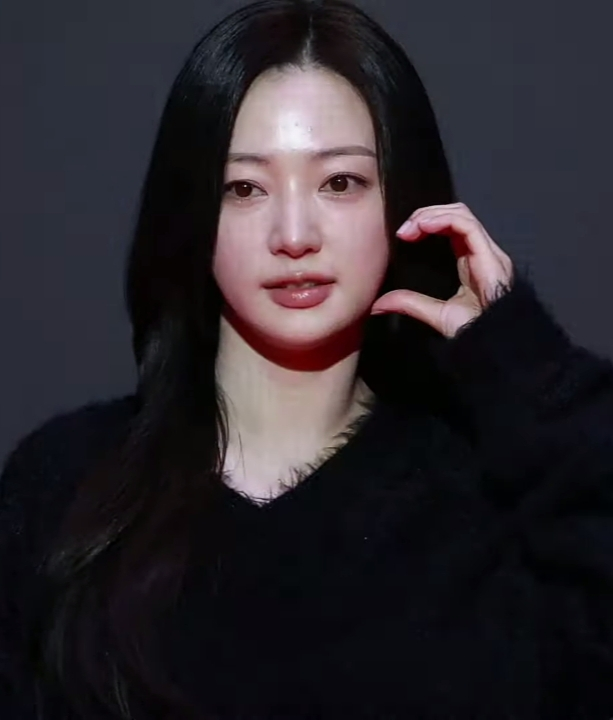
- Song in 2023
- Born: Kim Mi-sun; December 2, 1986 (age 39); Bucheon, South Korea
- Other name: Kim Byul (김별)
- Occupation: Actress
- Years active: 2003–present
- Agent: King Kong by Starship

Korean name
- Hangul: 김미선
- RR: Gim Miseon
- MR: Kim Misŏn

Stage name
- Hangul: 송하윤
- Hanja: 宋昰昀
- RR: Song Hayun
- MR: Song Hayun
- Website: Official website

Kim Mi-sun (Korean: 김미선; born December 2, 1986), better known by the stage name Song Ha-yoon (송하윤), is a South Korean actress. She is best known for her roles in the television series Fight for My Way (2017) and Marry My Husband (2024).

She debuted as Kim Byul in 2003, but changed her stage name in 2012.

== Bullying allegations controversy ==
After the success of Marry My Husband, Song came under media radar for being an alleged bully in school. A comment made by the alleged victim regarding Song using violence surfaced. The victim alleged that when Song had invited him to meet and had then held him down and hit him for 90 minutes. Before going public with his claims, he contacted Song's agency twice in an attempt to contact Song, and later said that if she had apologized, he would have dropped the matter. Instead, the agency twice told him that they couldn't reach Song. This prompted him to go public. After the bullying allegations came to light, it also turned out that Song had been expelled from her high school, but that expulsion was connected to a separate incident of school violence.

== Filmography ==
=== Film ===
Year	Title	Role	Ref.
2005	Innocent Steps		
2006	Dasepo Naughty Girls	Bellflower	
2006	Love House		
2008	Baby and I	Kim Byul	
2008	Members of the Funeral	Woo Ah-mi	
2009	Fly High	Soo-kyung	
2009	Stray Cats		
2012	Helpless	Han-na	
2012	Dangerously Excited	Mi-sun	
2014	Whistle Blower	Kim Yi-seul	
2018	Intimate Strangers	Se-gyeong	

=== Television series ===
Year	Title	Role	Ref.
2003	Sang Doo! Let's Go to School		
2005	Nonstop 5		
2005	MBC Best Theater: "Taereung National Village"	Jung Ma-roo	
2008	Strongest Chil Woo	Yeon-doo	
2011	KBS Drama Special: "Guardian Angel Kim Young-goo"	Choi Na-young	
2012	Phantom	Choi Seung-yeon	
2013	KBS Drama Special: "Chagall's Birthday"	Joon-hee	
2014	Reset	Choi Yoon-hee	
2014	Sweden Laundry	Kim Bom	
2014	KBS Drama Special: "I Introduce My Father"	Choi Hee-young	
2015	Dream Knight	Joo In-hyung	
2015	In Still Green Days	Lee Young-hee	
2015	My Daughter, Geum Sa-wol	Lee Hong-do / Joo Oh-wol	
2016	Touching You	Jin Hee-young	
2017	Band of Sisters	Sera Park	
2017	Fight for My Way	Baek Seol-hee	
2018	Devilish Charm	Joo Gi-Bbeum	
2020	Please Don't Date Him	Seo Ji-seong	
2023	Oh! Youngsim	Oh Young-sim	
2024	Marry My Husband	Jung Soo-min	
TBA	The History of Jealousy	TBA	

=== Music video appearances ===
Year	Title	Artist	Ref.
2004	"Sweety"	Clazziquai	
2005	"To Her" (그녀에게)	UN	
2006	"Snowman" (눈사람)	Gavy NJ	
2007	"After...Goodbye" (이별후에)	The Name & Choi Jin-yi	
2009	"Afraid"	st.Haru	
2010	"Unnecessary Words"	Tim feat. Yiruma	
2012	"Caffeine" (카페인)	Yang Yo-seob	
2013	"Although I" (그래도 나는)	Yang Yo-seob	

== Awards and nominations ==
Name of the award ceremony, year presented, category, nominee of the award, and the result of the nomination
Award ceremony	Year	Category	Nominee / Work	Result	Ref.
Baeksang Arts Awards	2018	Best Supporting Actress (TV)	Fight for My Way	Nominated	
Golden Cinema Film Festival	2019	Cinematographers' Choice Popularity Award	Intimate Strangers	Won	
KBS Drama Awards	2015	Excellence Award, Actress in a Daily Drama	In Still Green Days	Nominated	
KBS Drama Awards	2017	Best Couple Award	Song Ha-yoon (with Ahn Jae-hong); Fight for My Way	Nominated	
KBS Drama Awards	2017	Best Supporting Actress	Fight for My Way	Nominated	
Korea Drama Awards	2017	Excellence Award, Actress	Fight for My Way	Won	
Korea First Brand Awards	2018	Actress Category	Song Ha-yoon	Won	
KWeb Fest Awards	2016	Best Actress	Touching You	Won	
MBC Drama Awards	2015	Best New Actress in a Special Project Drama	My Daughter, Geum Sa-wol	Nominated	
SBS Drama Awards	2012	Special Acting Award, Actress in a Drama Special	Phantom	Nominated	
The Seoul Awards	2017	Best Supporting Actress – Drama	Fight for My Way	Nominated	
