= The Desperate Chase (film) =

South Korean action comedy film

- Theatrical release poster
- Hangul: 필사의 추격
- Lit.: Desperate Pursuit
- RR: Pilsaui chugyeok
- MR: P'ilsaŭi ch'ugyŏk
- Directed by: Kim Jae-hoon
- Written by: Han Jang-hyuk; Kim Aromi
- Produced by: Gu Seong-mok; Kim Sang-yoon
- Starring: Park Sung-woong; Kwak Si-yang; Yoon Kyung-ho
- Production companies: The Contents On; Contents G
- Distributed by: The Contents On
- Release date: August 21, 2024
- Running time: 110 minutes
- Country: South Korea
- Language: Korean
- Box office: US$779,896

The Desperate Chase (Korean: 필사의 추격) is a 2024 South Korean action comedy film directed by Kim Jae-hoon, starring Park Sung-woong, Kwak Si-yang, and Yoon Kyung-ho. The film is about a Gold Medi Valley, a medical complex, coming up in Jeju Island, where a troubled detective with anger control disorder, chases South Korea's best swindler and master of transformation. It premiered on August 21, 2024 in South Korea.

== Plot ==
Kim In-hae, a master conman known as "Big Bang" for his flawless disguises that baffle detectives; Jo Soo-kwang, a hot-headed detective with a quick temper and even quicker reflexes; and Joo Rin-pang, a cold-blooded crime boss. These three cross paths on Jeju Island, each with their own agenda. As soon as they arrive on the island, an unpredictable and chaotic chase ensues, with no way out.

== Cast ==
- Park Sung-woong as Kim In-hae
- Kwak Si-yang as Jo Soo-kwang
- Yoon Kyung-ho as Ju Rin-fang
- Jung Yoo-jin as Lee Soo-jin
- Park Hyo-joo as Yang Se-ra
- Ye Soo-jung as Chairperson Yoo

== Production ==
Filming began on December 19, 2022 and was wrapped up on March 8, 2023. Director Kim Jae-hoon said he was inspired to make the film during a month-long stay on Jeju Island. Speaking with the island's locals, he learned that "Jeju is suffering from many internal problems despite its outward appearance... Due to reckless development from Chinese capital, much of the natural landscape was being destroyed, and this was causing many conflicts among the local residents... I wanted to share these stories with a wider audience." Kim incorporated what he had seen and heard on the island into the script, with most of the filming taking place in the rural villages where he had resided whilst living on the island.

The film international rights were bought by Rights Cube, Apex Success Global), and Mockingbird Pictures) of Japan, Taiwan and Vietnam respectively prior to its market premiere in Cannes.

== Reception ==
=== Box office ===
The film was released on August 21, 2024 on 623 screens.

As of September 8, 2024, the film has grossed US$779,896 from 119,799 admissions.
