= VIP (South Korean TV series) =

2019 South Korean television series

- Promotional poster
- Hangul: 브이아이피
- RR: Beuiaipi
- MR: Pŭiaip'i
- Genre: Mystery; Drama
- Written by: Cha Hye-won
- Directed by: Lee Jung-rim
- Starring: Jang Na-ra; Lee Sang-yoon; Lee Chung-ah; Kwak Sun-young; Pyo Ye-jin; Shin Jae-ha
- Country of origin: South Korea
- Original language: Korean
- No. of episodes: 16

Production
- Producer: Song Kyung-hwa
- Running time: 60 minutes
- Production company: The Story Works

Original release
- Network: SBS TV
- Release: October 28 – December 24, 2019

VIP (Korean: 브이아이피) is a 2019 South Korean television series starring Jang Na-ra, Lee Sang-yoon, Lee Chung-ah, Kwak Sun-young, Pyo Ye-jin and Shin Jae-ha. It aired on SBS TV from October 28 to December 24, 2019, every Monday and Tuesday at 22:00 (KST) for 16 episodes.

== Synopsis ==
The story of Sung Un Department Store's team who works for the VIP clients which constitute the top 1% of their customers.

One day after a receiving a text message about her husband's infidelity from an anonymous source, Na Jeong-seon (Jang Na-ra) begins to suspect her husband and her colleagues of having an affair. In her quest to discover the truth, she ends up unravelling more than one secret that her colleagues are hiding.

== Cast ==
=== Main ===
==== VIP Team ====
- Jang Na-ra as Na Jeong-seon

Wife and colleague to Park Seong-joon. She is from an affluent family and got a high-level job at Sung Un Department Store without much difficulty, after graduating from a prestigious university.

- Lee Sang-yoon as Park Seong-joon

The team leader of Sung Un Department Store's VIP Management Team and Na Jeong-seon's husband.

- Lee Chung-ah as Lee Hyeon-ah

A professional and fashionable section chief of VIP Management Team. She has recently returned from a year off work due to a former scandal with her boss, who was in charge of HR.

- Kwak Sun-young as Song Mi-na

A working mother of two young sons who had missed a few promotions due to multiple maternity leaves, despite having worked for six years in the company.

- Pyo Ye-jin as On Yoo-ri

She comes from a poor family and fights for survival. She becomes the center of office gossip after landing a job at Sung Un Department Store's VIP Management Team. Her hiring caused the team members' lives to change.

- Shin Jae-ha as Ma Sang-woo

A new employee at the VIP Management Team. He has been brought up in comfortable surroundings, with a prestigious education.

=== Supporting ===
==== Sung Un Department Store ====
- Jung Joon-won as Cha Jin-ho
- Lee Jae-won (actor) as Lee Byeong-hoon, Mi-na's husband
- Park Sung-geun as Ha Jae-woong
- Jang Hyuk-jin as Bae Do-il
- Cho Seung-yeon as Ha Young-woong
- Lee Jin-hee as Kang Ji-young

==== Others ====
- Kim Mi-kyung as Key Mi-ok
- Choi Hong-il as Na Young-chul
- Jung Ae-ri as Han Sook-young
- Sora Jung as Han Sook-ja
- Bae Hae-sun as Gil-ja
- Jang Hyun-sung as Jang Jin-chul
- Yoon Ji-on as Kim Min-ki
- Oh Se-young as Han So-mi
- Jeon Hye-jin as Lee Byung-eun

=== Special appearances ===
- Oh Ah-rin as Ha Rim
- Bae Hae-sun as a nouveau riche VIP customer
- Kim Yu-bin as Cha Se-rin
- Seo Woo-jin as Seo-jin
- Soy Kim as Ria
- Lee Ki-chan as Daniel
- Shim Hee-sub as Chef Michael

== Episodes ==
No.	Title	Directed by	Written by	Original release date	South Korea viewers (millions)
1	"A Whole New World"	Lee Jung-rim	Cha Hye-won	October 28, 2019	1.059
2	"Women With a Secret"	Lee Jung-rim	Cha Hye-won	October 29, 2019	1.263
3	"Crack"	Lee Jung-rim	Cha Hye-won	November 4, 2019	1.354
4	"Truth or Dare"	Lee Jung-rim	Cha Hye-won	November 5, 2019	1.407
5	"Ugly Truth"	Lee Jung-rim	Cha Hye-won	November 18, 2019	1.276
6	"Red Pill or Blue Pill"	Lee Jung-rim	Cha Hye-won	November 19, 2019	1.469
7	"The Calm Before the Storm"	Lee Jung-rim	Cha Hye-won	November 25, 2019	1.306
8	"Tifóne"	Lee Jung-rim	Cha Hye-won	November 26, 2019	1.894
9	"After the Storm"	Lee Jung-rim	Cha Hye-won	December 2, 2019	1.898
10	"Out of Tune"	Lee Jung-rim	Cha Hye-won	December 3, 2019	2.081
11	"Irreparable"	Lee Jung-rim	Cha Hye-won	December 9, 2019	2.006
12	"Blind Side"	Lee Jung-rim	Cha Hye-won	December 10, 2019	2.159
13	"Two Opponents"	Lee Jung-rim	Cha Hye-won	December 16, 2019	2.163
14	"End of the Maze"	Lee Jung-rim	Cha Hye-won	December 17, 2019	2.248
15	"Were We Ever In Love?"	Lee Jung-rim	Cha Hye-won	December 23, 2019	2.468
16	"Someone's Ending, Someone's Beginning"	Lee Jung-rim	Cha Hye-won	December 24, 2019	2.688

== Production ==
The first script reading took place on April 18, 2019. Filming began on May 9 and ended on October 26, 2019, two days before the premiere of the series.

== Reception ==
=== Viewership ===
VIP : South Korea viewers per episode (millions)

Season	Episode number																Average
Season	1	2	3	4	5	6	7	8	9	10	11	12	13	14	15	16	Average
1	1.059	1.263	1.354	1.407	1.276	1.469	1.306	1.894	1.898	2.081	2.006	2.159	2.163	2.248	2.468	2.688	1.796

Source: Audience measurement performed nationwide by Nielsen Media Research.

Average TV viewership ratings
Ep.	Part	Original broadcast date	Average audience share		
Ep.	Part	Original broadcast date	AGB Nielsen		TNmS
Ep.	Part	Original broadcast date	Nationwide	Seoul	Nationwide
1	1	October 28, 2019	5.9% (17th)	6.7% (15th)	6.1% (18th)
1	2	October 28, 2019	6.8% (15th)	7.8% (9th)	6.6% (15th)
2	1	October 29, 2019	6.5% (13th)	6.9% (12th)	6.4% (13th)
2	2	October 29, 2019	7.6% (7th)	8.2% (5th)	7.4% (12th)
3	1	November 4, 2019	6.0% (17th)	7.1% (12th)	6.8% (15th)
3	2	November 4, 2019	8.0% (10th)	9.4% (3rd)	7.5% (14th)
4	1	November 5, 2019	7.4% (10th)	8.5% (4th)	6.9% (13th)
4	2	November 5, 2019	9.1% (5th)	10.4% (2nd)	8.2% (8th)
5	1	November 18, 2019 (Note: Broadcast is delayed due to the SBS 2019 WBSC Premier 12 baseball game broadcast.)	5.9% (18th)	6.7% (12th)	6.0% (20th)
5	2	November 18, 2019	7.8% (10th)	9.1% (5th)	7.6% (12th)
6	1	November 19, 2019	6.1% (15th)	7.0% (10th)	6.8% (15th)
6	2	November 19, 2019	9.0% (4th)	10.4% (3rd)	8.9% (8th)
7	1	November 25, 2019	6.4% (14th)	7.1% (13th)	7.0% (15th)
7	2	November 25, 2019	8.1% (10th)	9.0% (4th)	8.2% (10th)
8	1	November 26, 2019	8.5% (8th)	9.1% (6th)	7.5% (11th)
8	2	November 26, 2019	11.4% (4th)	12.4% (2nd)	9.9% (7th)
9	1	December 2, 2019	8.3% (10th)	8.9% (6th)	7.8% (13th)
9	2	December 2, 2019	11.3% (4th)	12.3% (2nd)	9.2% (7th)
10	1	December 3, 2019	10.6% (5th)	11.4% (3rd)	8.0% (10th)
10	2	December 3, 2019	12.7% (2nd)	13.5% (2nd)	10.4% (7th)
11	1	December 9, 2019	9.6% (6th)	10.8% (5th)	8.4% (10th)
11	2	December 9, 2019	12.2% (4th)	13.6% (2nd)	10.6% (7th)
12	1	December 10, 2019	10.0% (6th)	11.0% (4th)	8.5% (9th)
12	2	December 10, 2019	13.2% (2nd)	14.2% (2nd)	10.7% (7th)
13	1	December 16, 2019	10.6% (5th)	12.0% (4th)	9.2% (10th)
13	2	December 16, 2019	13.1% (3rd)	15.0% (2nd)	11.0% (5th)
14	1	December 17, 2019	11.2% (5th)	12.6% (3rd)	10.2% (7th)
14	2	December 17, 2019	13.9% (2nd)	15.7% (2nd)	12.6% (4th)
15	1	December 23, 2019	11.9% (5th)	13.8% (3rd)	9.8% (7th)
15	2	December 23, 2019	14.9% (2nd)	16.6% (1st)	12.9% (3rd)
16	1	December 24, 2019	12.0% (3rd)	13.0% (3rd)	11.5% (5th)
16	2	December 24, 2019	15.9% (2nd)	17.7% (1st)	14.2% (3rd)
Average			9.8%	10.9%	8.8%
In the table above, the blue numbers represent the lowest ratings and the red numbers represent the highest ratings.

=== Accolades ===
Year	Award	Category	Nominee	Result	Ref.
2019	2019 SBS Drama Awards	Best New Actor	Shin Jae-ha	Nominated	
2019	2019 SBS Drama Awards	Best New Actress	Kwak Sun-young	Nominated	
2019	2019 SBS Drama Awards	Best Supporting Actress	Lee Chung-ah	Won	
2019	2019 SBS Drama Awards	Best Character Award (Actress)	Pyo Ye-jin	Won	
2019	2019 SBS Drama Awards	Excellence Award in Miniseries (Actor)	Lee Sang-yoon	Won	
2019	2019 SBS Drama Awards	Top Excellence Award in Miniseries (Actress)	Jang Na-ra	Nominated	
2019	2019 SBS Drama Awards	Producer Award	Jang Na-ra	Won	

== Adaptations ==
Country	Local title	Network	Original release
Thailand	VIP รักซ่อนชู้	One 31	11 October 2023 – 30 November 2023
