= Flight (2009 film) =

- Theatrical poster
- Hangul: 비상
- Hanja: 飛上
- RR: Bisang
- MR: Pisang
- Directed by: Park Jeong-hun
- Written by: Park Jeong-hun
- Produced by: DDOL Film
- Starring: Kim Bum; Kim Byul; Bae Soo-bin
- Edited by: Kim Mi-yeong
- Music by: Lee Won-kyung; Kim Hye-ji
- Release date: December 3, 2009
- Running time: 100 minutes
- Country: South Korea
- Language: Korean
- Box office: $141,392 (28,896)

Flight (Korean: 비상; also known as Fly High) is a 2009 South Korean romantic action drama film directed by Park Jeong-hun, starring Kim Bum, Kim Byul and Bae Soo-bin.

== Plot ==
Si-bum dreams of becoming an actor. One day, he meets Su-kyoung and falls in love with her at first sight. With Si-bum around, Su-kyoung seems to get over her depression and her strained relationship with her father, but suddenly Su-kyoung disappears to confront her mother's death. After receiving contact, Si-bum meets up with Su-kyoung at the sea and both escape their realities. Su-kyoung becomes severely injured in an accident, and in desperately struggling to save her, Si-bum steals money to pay her hospital bills. However, he had stolen from a gang who catches and forces him to work as a male escort. Si-bum uses his acting skills to cheer up a recovering Su-kyoung pretending he makes a living from acting. As his popularity rises as an escort, he follows Ho-su, his boss and mentor, to make more money in Seoul. One day he comes across one of his old friends and gets involved in a big fight.

== Cast ==
- Kim Bum as Si-bum
- Kim Byul as Su-kyoung
- Bae Soo-bin as Ho-su
- Lee Chae-young as Su-ah
- Yeon Je-wook as Gu-taek
- Kim Jin-woo as Young-ho
- Ko Yun-ho as Se-joong
- Bang Young as Detective Oh
- Kim Hye-jin as Seong-ju
- Kim Jung-heon as Amazonness Si-bum host
- Park Min-jung as Woman from affair
- Ban Min-jeong as Hye-jeong
- Won Poong-yeon as Gi-doong
- Lee Chan-ho as Youngest
