= Jung Soo-young =

South Korean actress (born 1982)

- Born: Jung Soo-young; 12 February 1982 (age 44); South Korea
- Other names: Jung Su-young, Jeong Soo-yeong, Jeong Su-young
- Education: Kookmin University; Korea National University of Arts
- Occupation: Actress
- Years active: 2000–present
- Known for: Second to Last Love; Fates & Furies; My Contracted Husband, Mr. Oh
- Spouse: Shim Jae-rim

Jung Soo-young is a South Korean actress. She is best known for her role in drama Second to Last Love as Go Sang-hee.

== Personal life ==
Jung is married to Shim Jae-rim who is also an actor.

== Filmography ==
=== Television series ===
Year	Title	Role
2006	Couple or Trouble	Kang-ja
2007	War of Money	Kim Hyun-jung
2007	Drama City: "Pure Suni"	Young-ja
2007	Kimchi Cheese Smile	Jung Soo-yeong
2008	Four Colours of Love	Jeong Su-young
2008	Hometown Legends: "Woman Returning Home"	Yoon
2009	The Road Home	Kim Min-kyung
2009	The City Hall	Jung Bo-mi
2009	Hero	Na Ga-yeong
2010	The Woman Who Still Wants to Marry	Sang-woo's colleague
2010	The Great Merchant	Kim Seo-joo
2010	Coffee House	Oh Hyun Joo
2010	Queen of Reversals	Ji Hwa-ja (Cameo)
2011	KBS Drama Special: "Sorry I'm Late"	Eun-joo
2011	Me Too, Flower!	Drunken woman (Cameo)
2012	Angel's Choice	Kang Yu-mi
2012	Big	Shaman (Cameo)
2012	Arang and the Magistrate	Bang-wool's client
2012	Jeon Woo-chi	Eul-yi
2013	Heartless City	Prosecutor Oh Jeong-yeon
2013	KBS Drama Special: "Puberty Medley"	Jung Woo and Ah Yeong's homeroom teacher (Cameo)
2013	KBS Drama Special: "Yeonu's Summer"	Lee Ji-yeong
2013	KBS Drama Special: "The Devil Rider"	Woman from Mapo
2013	Drama Festival: "The Sleeping Witch"	Hwa Jeong
2013	Secret Love	Lee Ja-yeong
2013	Let's Eat	Park Kyung-mi
2014	Can We Fall in Love, Again?	Moon Eun-joo
2014	Mama	Jin Hyo-jung
2014	Discovery of Love	Jang Gi-eun
2014	Flirty Boy and Girl	Man third elder sister
2014	Misaeng: Incomplete Life	Kang Min-kyung (Cameo)
2015	Divorce Lawyer in Love	Lee Hong-yeon (Cameo)
2015	Who Are You: School 2015	Ahn Joo-ri
2015	Mrs. Cop	Hong Ban-jang
2015	Second 20s	Ra Yoon-yeong
2015	The Village: Achiara's Secret	Hye-jin's friend
2016	My Little Baby	Jo Ji-yeong
2016	Let's Make a New Start	Na Yeong-jin
2016	Second to Last Love	Go Sang-hee
2017	Ms. Perfect	Kim Won-jae
2017	Fight for My Way	Moo-ki's new girlfriend (Cameo)
2017	Jugglers	Moon Soon-young
2018	Welcome to Waikiki	Department store person (Cameo)
2018	Mysterious Personal Shopper	Hong Seon-hee
2018	My Contracted Husband, Mr. Oh	Park Kyung-sook
2018	What's Wrong with Secretary Kim	Kim-joong (Cameo)
2018	Fates & Furies	Kang Sun-young
2019	My Fellow Citizens!	Jo Myung-im
2019	Her Private Life	Fortune Teller (Cameo)
2019	I Wanna Hear Your Song	Gong Seon-mi (Cameo)
2019	Miss Lee	Lee Sun-shin
2020	My Dangerous Wife	Kim Hee-jung
2020	Live On	Jae-yi's mother (Cameo)
2021	Uncle	Cheon Da-jeong
2022	My Liberation Notes	Jo Kyung-sun
2022	Three Bold Siblings	Na Eun-joo
2022	Hit the Spot	Lee Mi-young
2023	Secret Playlist	Go Yoo-jung
2024	The Two Sisters	Yoon Yi-ra
2024	The Tale of Lady Ok	Mrs. Hong
2025	Dynamite Kiss	Jang Jin-hee
2025	Typhoon Family	Cha Ju-joo
2026	Positively Yours	Bang Soon-hee

=== Variety shows ===
Year	Title	Role
2017	King of Mask Singer	Contestant (Rapunzel) Episode 113

=== Film ===
Year	Title	Role	Language
2008	A Man Who Wants to Kill	Jin-hee	Korean
2009	Fortune Salon	Customer (Cameo)	Korean
2010	Harmony	Ji Hwa-ja	Korean
2012	Whatcha Wearin'?	Jin-joo	Korean
2013	The Five	Dae-ho's wife	Korean
2015	Love Guide for Dumpees	Teacher Kim	Korean
2017	My Last Love	Kim Soon-jeong	Korean
2024	Love in the Big City	Jun-su's mother	Korean
TBA	Nineteen, Thirty-Nine	Nam Hee-nam	Korean

== Theater ==
Year	English title	Korean title	Role	Ref.
2002–2003	Mamma Mia!	맘마 미아	Alee	
2004, 2007–2009	Singin' in the Rain	사랑은 비를 타고	Yoo Mi-ri	
2005	Little Shop of Horrors	리틀 샵 오브 호러스	Chiffon	
2005	Grease	그리스	Marty	
2008	The Seagull	갈매기	Nina	
2012	Hamlet	햄릿	Sarah	

== Awards and nominations ==
Year presented, name of the award ceremony, category, nominated work, and the result of the nomination
Year	Award	Category	Nominated work	Result	Ref.
2016	SBS Drama Awards	Special Award	Second to Last Love	Nominated	
2023	Scene Stealer Festival	Bonsang (Main Prize)	My Liberation Notes	Won	
