= Arie (singer) =

South Korean singer (born 1985)

Arie 아리
- Born: Kim Hyo-shin; August 6, 1985 (age 40)
- Origin: South Korea
- Genres: Rock
- Occupation: Singer
- Instrument: Vocals
- Years active: 2010–present
- Label: Garnet
- Member of: Arie Band, P.O.M, 나누미7일짱
- Website: blog.naver.com/arie2yagi

Korean name
- Hangul: 김효신
- RR: Gim Hyosin
- MR: Kim Hyosin

Stage name
- Hangul: 아리
- RR: Ari
- MR: Ari

Arie (born Kim Hyo-shin on August 6, 1985) is a South Korean singer. She is leader and member of idol rock band Arie Band, and member of project groups P.O.M (Pair of magnetar) and 나누미7일짱. Her father is Kim Sung-il, CEO of record label Garnet Entertainment.

== Discography ==
=== Singles ===
- R U Ready?, March 2010
- P.O.M – Beautiful, June 2014
- Merci, August 2015
- 여행, September 2015
- 나누미7일짱 – 이리와, February 2016

=== Soundtracks ===
- 위험한 여자 OST Part 2, January 2012
- 위대한 조강지처 OST Part 3, October 2015
- 위대한 조강지처 OST, November 2015
- 별난가족 OST Part 2, August 2016
- 혼술남녀 OST Part 6, October 2016 (with Yoon Ji-hoon)
