= Yoon Sa-bong =

South Korean actress (born 1980)

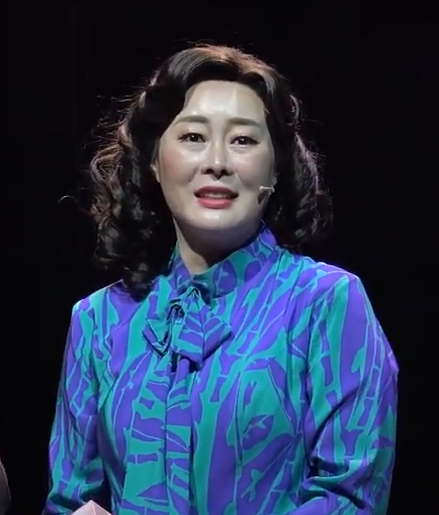
- Yoon in 2022
- Born: Yoon Sa-bong; June 5, 1980 (age 46); South Korea
- Other names: Yoon Mi-soo, Yoon Mi-su
- Education: Kyungsung University (Bachelor of Drama and Film)
- Occupations: Actress; singer
- Years active: 2006–present
- Agent: Hunus Entertainment
- Known for: Hi Bye, Mama! The Tale of Nokdu; Love Returns

Korean name
- Hangul: 윤사봉
- RR: Yun Sabong
- MR: Yun Sabong

Yoon Sa-bong (Korean: 윤사봉; born June 5, 1980) is a South Korean actress and singer. She made her debut in musical show "Nonsense" (2006). She also appeared in dramas, The Tale of Nokdu, Love Returns and Hi Bye, Mama!.

== Biography and career ==
She was born on June 5, 1980. She completed her studies from Kyungsung University. She made her debut as an actress in 2006. In 2008 she got Fox Award in 2nd Daegu Music Awards. After her debut as an actress, she has appeared in several films and television dramas including Hi Bye, Mama!, The Tale of Nokdu and Love Returns. She appeared in movies such as Finding Mr. Destiny and Kim Ji-young: Born 1982.

== Filmography ==
=== Television series ===
| Year | Title | Role | Ref. |
|---|---|---|---|
| 2016 | Shopping King Louie | Yeji | |
| 2017 | Tomorrow, with You | Mi-soo | |
| 2017 | Fight for My Way | Kim Joo-hye | |
| 2017 | The Lady in Dignity | Yoon-su | |
| 2017 | Hello, My Twenties! 2 | Ho Chang's sister | |
| 2017 | Love Returns | Park Bo-geum | |
| 2018 | Partners for Justice | Jang Hoo-nam | |
| 2019 | Arthdal Chronicles | Hae Took-ak | |
| 2019 | The Tale of Nokdu | Kang Soon-nyeo | |
| 2020 | Hi Bye, Mama! | Mi Dong-daek | |
| 2020 | Good Casting | Prison boss | |
| 2020 | Private Lives | Yang In Sook | |
| 2021 | Nevertheless | Jung Sook-eun | |
| 2021 | Lovers of the Red Sky | Kyun Joo-daek | |
| 2022 | Forecasting Love and Weather | Oh Myung-joo | |
| 2022 | Crazy Love | Lady Hong (cameo) | |
| 2022–2023 | Trolley | Kim Bit-na | |
| 2024 | Knight Flower | Jang So-woon | |
| 2024 | O'PENing: Grand Shining Hotel | Seo Eun-seok | |
| 2024 | Connection | Jung Yeon-joo | |

=== Web series ===
| Year | Title | Role | Ref. |
|---|---|---|---|
| 2022 | The Sound of Magic | Yoon Ah-yi's landlady | |
| 2023 | Moving | School's janitor | |

=== Film ===
| Year | Title | Role | Language | Ref. |
|---|---|---|---|---|
| 2010 | Finding Mr. Destiny | Ms.Jung | Korean | |
| 2019 | Kim Ji-young: Born 1982 | Soo-hyun | Korean | |
| 2020 | And So Again Today | The Season of the Next Step | Korean | |
| 2020 | The Season of the Next Step | Sa-bong | Korean | |
| 2022 | Honest Candidate 2 | Ms. Han | Korean | |

== Theater ==
| Year | English title | Korean title | Role | Ref. |
|---|---|---|---|---|
| 2022 | Crash Landing on You | 사랑의 불시착 | Ma Young-ae | |

== Awards and nominations ==
Name of the award ceremony, year presented, category, nominee of the award, and the result of the nomination
| Award ceremony | Year | Category | Result | Nominee / Work | Ref. |
|---|---|---|---|---|---|
| 2nd Daegu Music Awards | 2008 | Best Actress | Won | Yoon Sa-bong | |
| SBS Drama Awards | 2024 | Best Supporting Actress in a Miniseries Genre/Action | Won | Connection | |
