= Arie Band =

South Korean idol rock band

Arie Band 아리 밴드
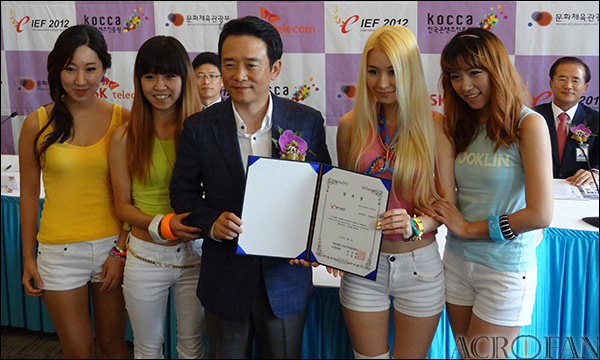
- Arie Band in 2012

Background information
- Origin: Seoul, South Korea
- Genres: Rock; K-pop; dance music
- Years active: 2010–present
- Label: Garnet Entertainment
- Members: Arie; So Hyeon; Ji Hei; Lee Joo
- Past members: ZinA

Arie Band is South Korean all-female idol rock band formed around its lead vocalist, Arie. Arie Band was selected as rookie of the month in July 2010. Arie and her band were featured in January 2011 on Mnet show M Rookies performing the main theme of the South Korean television drama Assorted Gems.

== Discography ==
=== Singles ===
- Oh! You, October 2012
- Oh! You (Take 3), April 2013

=== EPs ===
- Astonish The World, November 2012
- OST Best Collection, May 2014

=== Soundtracks ===
- A Hundred Year's Inheritance OST, May 2013
- KBS2 드라마 쌈, 마이웨이, May 2017
- 보그맘, September 2017
