= IWill Media =

South Korean drama production company

iWill Media Corporation
- iWill Media logo
- Native name: 아이윌미디어
- Type: Small and medium-sized enterprises
- Genre: Korean drama
- Founded: December 20, 2010
- Founder: Kim Jong-shik
- Headquarters: 11th floor, KBS Media Center, 45 Maebongsan-ro, Seogyo-dong, Mapo District, Seoul, South Korea
- Number of locations: South Korea
- Key people: Kim Jong-shik (Founder); Jeon Yong-joo (President and CEO)
- Products: TV series
- Services: TV series production
- Revenue: 136,385,600,000 (December 2016)
- Owner: Terapin Studios (100%)
- Number of employees: 9 (December 2016)
- Parent: NPX Capital (2022-present)
- Website: iwillmedia.co.kr

iWill Media (Korean: 아이윌미디어) is a Korean drama production company founded in 2010 by former KBS and Pan Entertainment executive Kim Jong-shik. As of July 2022, it now operates as a subsidiary of Terapin Studios, itself a division of NPX Capital.

== Works ==
Year	Title	Original title	Network	Ref.
2011	The Best Day in My Life	오늘만 같아라	MBC TV	
2012	Syndrome	신드롬	JTBC	
2013	When a Man Falls in Love	남자가 사랑할 때	MBC TV	
2013	A Little Love Never Hurts	사랑해서 남주나	MBC TV	
2014	Love & Secret	달콤한 비밀	KBS2	
2015	My Mother Is a Daughter-in-law	어머님은 내 며느리	SBS TV	
2015	The Time We Were Not in Love	너를 사랑한 시간	SBS TV	
2015	I Have a Lover	애인 있어요	SBS TV	
2016	Solomon's Perjury	솔로몬의 위증	JTBC	
2017	Sisters-in-Law	별별 며느리	MBC TV	
2017	Witch at Court	마녀의 법정	KBS2	
2017	Black	블랙	OCN	
2018	Player	플레이어	OCN	
2019	Gracious Revenge	우아한 모녀	KBS2	
2020	Men Are Men	그놈이 그놈이다	KBS2	
2020	Royal Secret Agent	신 암행어사	KBS2	
2021	On the Verge of Insanity	미치지 않고서야	MBC TV	
2023	Moon in the Day	낮에 뜨는 달	ENA	
2025	A Head Coach's Turnover	맹감독의 악플러	MBC TV	

== Production crew ==
=== Actors ===
- Yook Sung-jae

=== Screenwriters ===
- Joo Chan-ok
- Choi Hyun-kyung
- Park Ye-kyung
- Oh Sang-hee
- Choi Ran
- Seo Yoon-hee
- Lee Ha-na
- Moon Jung-min
- Park Ji-ha
- Shin Jae-hyung
- Kim Ho-soo

=== Directors ===
- Kang Il-soo
