= Sisters-in-Law (TV series) =

2017 South Korean television series

- Promotional poster
- Also known as: All Kinds of Daughters-in-Law; Unique Daughters-in-Law
- Hangul: 별별 며느리
- RR: Byeolbyeol myeoneuri
- MR: Pyŏlbyŏl myŏnŭri
- Genre: Family; Melodrama
- Created by: Kim Sung-mo
- Written by: Oh Sang-hee
- Directed by: Lee Jae-jin
- Starring: Hahm Eun-jung; Lee Joo-yeon; Kang Kyung-joon; Cha Do-jin
- Country of origin: South Korea
- Original language: Korean
- No. of episodes: 100

Production
- Executive producers: Kim Jong-sik; Song Jae-joon
- Running time: 30 min
- Production company: iWill Media

Original release
- Network: MBC TV
- Release: June 5 – November 14, 2017

Sisters-in-Law (Korean: 별별 며느리; RR: Byeolbyeol myeoneuri; lit. All Kinds of Daughters-in-Law) is a 2017 South Korean television series starring Hahm Eun-jung, Lee Joo-yeon, Kang Kyung-joon, and Cha Do-jin. The series airs daily on MBC from 20:55 to 21:30 (KST), however, starting episode 40, the series was moved to Monday and Tuesday 20:55 (KST) time-slot with 2 episodes back-to-back.

== Cast ==
=== Main ===
- Hahm Eun-jung as Hwang Eun-byul
- Kang Kyung-joon as Choi Han-joo
- Lee Joo-yeon as Hwang Geum-byul
- Cha Do-jin as Park Min-ho

=== Supporting ===
- Nam Myung-ryul as Hwang Ho-sik
- Kim Chung as Na Myung-ja
- Kim Young-ok as Kang Hae-soon
- Jo Kyung-sook as Shin Young-ae
- Kim Byung-choon as Choi Soo-chan
- Park Hee-jin as Choi Soon-young
- Cha Seo-won as Choi Dong-joo
- Choi Jung-woo as Park Sang-goo
- Moon Hee-kyung as Yoon So-hee
- Nam Sang-ji as Park Ji-ho
- Jang Sung-won as Jang Tae-poong
- Oh Joo-eun as Oh Mi-ja
- Son Se-yoon as Yang Soo-min
- Kim Jae-hyun as Kim Tae-gi
- Son Gun-woo as Yoon Gun-woo
- Song Ho-soo as Oh Seung-chan
- Yang Dae-hyuk as Jang Hyun-soo
- Jung Ah-rang as Kim Mi-jung
- Choi Hyun-seo as Baek Min-joo
- Ahn Bo-hyun as James Seo / Seo Joon-young
- Kim Young-pil as Han Jang-soo
- Kim Jung-soo as Doctor Kim
- Choi Seung-hoon

== Original soundtrack ==
=== Part 1 ===
No.	Title	Artist	Length
1.	"Love Holiday"	Hyemi (Nine Muses)	03:37
2.	"Love Holiday" (Inst.)		03:37
Total length:			07:14

=== Part 2 ===
No.	Title	Artist	Length
1.	"With You" (그대와 함께)	Shin Joo-hyun	03:46
2.	"With You" (Inst.)		03:46
Total length:			07:32

=== Part 3 ===
No.	Title	Artist	Length
1.	"Happy Day" (기분 좋은 날)	1set	02:46
2.	"Happy Day" (Inst.)		02:46
Total length:			05:32

== Ratings ==
- In this table, The blue numbers represent the lowest ratings and the red numbers represent the highest ratings.
- NR denotes that the drama did not rank in the top 20 daily programs on that date.

Ep.	Original broadcast date	Average audience share			
Ep.	Original broadcast date	TNmS		AGB Nielsen	
Ep.	Original broadcast date	Nationwide	Seoul	Nationwide	Seoul
1	June 5, 2017	7.9% (15th)	7.4% (13th)	7.4% (15th)	7.5% (13th)
2	June 6, 2017	7.6% (17th)	7.5% (18th)	6.6% (NR)	(NR)
3	June 7, 2017	7.3% (16th)	6.8% (17th)	6.9% (NR)	7.4% (19th)
4	June 8, 2017	7.7% (14th)	7.8% (12th)	5.7% (NR)	(NR)
5	June 9, 2017	6.4% (17th)	6.1% (18th)	5.9% (18th)	5.8% (20th)
6	June 12, 2017	7.5% (19th)	7.2% (20th)	6.5% (NR)	(NR)
7	June 13, 2017	7.9% (16th)	7.0% (18th)	6.5% (NR)	7.3% (12th)
8	June 14, 2017	7.0% (NR)	(NR)	6.7% (NR)	7.2% (13th)
9	June 15, 2017	6.4% (NR)	(NR)	6.8% (17th)	7.5% (12th)
10	June 16, 2017	6.7% (16th)	6.3% (16th)	6.0% (19th)	5.9% (18th)
11	June 19, 2017	7.6% (17th)	7.1% (16th)	6.0% (NR)	(NR)
12	June 20, 2017	7.1% (15th)	5.9% (18th)	6.0% (NR)	(NR)
13	June 21, 2017	6.4% (NR)	(NR)	5.2% (NR)	(NR)
14	June 22, 2017	7.0% (20th)	(NR)	5.6% (NR)	6.0% (18th)
15	June 23, 2017	6.8% (17th)	6.5% (18th)	5.8% (18th)	6.0% (18th)
16	June 26, 2017	7.3% (16th)	6.9% (17th)	6.3% (NR)	(NR)
17	June 27, 2017	7.1% (19th)	6.3% (19th)	7.0% (17th)	7.3% (16th)
18	June 28, 2017	6.9% (16th)	6.4% (20th)	5.9% (NR)	(NR)
19	June 29, 2017	6.8% (19th)	7.0% (18th)	5.6% (NR)	(NR)
20	June 30, 2017	6.3% (18th)	4.9% (20th)	5.7% (18th)	(NR)
21	July 3, 2017	7.2% (NR)	(NR)	5.4% (NR)	(NR)
22	July 4, 2017	7.4% (19th)	(NR)	6.9% (17th)	7.2% (17th)
23	July 5, 2017	7.5% (17th)	(NR)	5.7% (NR)	(NR)
24	July 6, 2017	7.2% (20th)	7.2% (19th)	6.3% (NR)	(NR)
25	July 7, 2017	7.4% (17th)	7.0% (18th)	5.7% (20th)	5.9% (20th)
26	July 10, 2017	9.2% (16th)	8.7% (16th)	6.6% (NR)	(NR)
27	July 11, 2017	7.1% (19th)	(NR)	6.3% (NR)	(NR)
28	July 12, 2017	7.1% (19th)	(NR)	6.6% (NR)	7.4% (15th)
29	July 13, 2017	8.3% (16th)	8.3% (16th)	6.1% (NR)	6.5% (20th)
30	July 14, 2017	6.7% (19th)	6.0% (19th)	6.0% (19th)	(NR)
31	July 17, 2017	8.8% (15th)	8.8% (12th)	6.8% (NR)	(NR)
32	July 18, 2017	8.2% (14th)	7.9% (13th)	6.4% (18th)	6.7% (16th)
33	July 19, 2017	7.7% (17th)	7.2% (20th)	5.7% (NR)	(NR)
34	July 20, 2017	7.3% (18th)	7.2% (16th)	5.6% (NR)	(NR)
35	July 21, 2017	7.8% (17th)	7.0% (18th)	6.4% (18th)	6.6% (17th)
36	July 24, 2017	8.2% (19th)	7.7% (20th)	6.7% (NR)	(NR)
37	July 25, 2017	7.9% (15th)	7.0% (17th)	6.9% (20th)	6.7% (18th)
38	July 26, 2017	7.9% (17th)	(NR)	5.3% (NR)	(NR)
39	July 27, 2017	7.9% (17th)	(NR)	5.4% (NR)	(NR)
40	July 28, 2017	7.8% (16th)	7.4% (17th)	6.0% (20th)	(NR)
41	July 31, 2017	8.3% (16th)	7.0% (19th)	6.9% (NR)	(NR)
42	July 31, 2017	7.3% (19th)	(NR)	6.2% (NR)	(NR)
43	August 1, 2017	7.5% (16th)	6.8% (18th)	6.3% (NR)	6.4% (17th)
44	August 1, 2017	9.1% (13th)	8.4% (11th)	7.6% (15th)	8.0% (11th)
45	August 7, 2017	8.0% (17th)	(NR)	(NR)	(NR)
46	August 7, 2017	7.8% (18th)	(NR)	6.8% (19th)	6.8% (18th)
47	August 8, 2017	8.3% (15th)	7.4% (14th)	6.4% (19th)	6.6% (17th)
48	August 8, 2017	8.9% (11th)	7.9% (12th)	6.9% (16th)	7.1% (14th)
49	August 14, 2017	8.0 (17th)	6.8 (19th)	5.7% (NR)	(NR)
50	August 14, 2017	8.8% (14th)	7.3% (15th)	6.3% (NR)	(NR)
51	August 15, 2017	8.0% (14th)	6.9% (16th)	6.6% (NR)	(NR)
52	August 15, 2017	9.2% (6th)	8.3% (7th)	7.7% (15th)	7.9% (12th)
53	August 21, 2017	8.7% (16th)	7.5% (17th)	6.2% (NR)	(NR)
54	August 21, 2017	9.3% (13th)	8.3% (12th)	7.2% (19th)	7.0% (19th)
55	August 22, 2017	8.1% (16th)	6.0% (20th)	5.9% (NR)	(NR)
56	August 22, 2017	9.7% (10th)	7.0% (18th)	7.8% (11th)	7.2% (12th)
57	August 28, 2017	8.6% (17th)	7.7% (18th)	(NR)	6.9% (19th)
58	August 28, 2017	10.0% (12th)	8.9% (13th)	8.7% (15th)	9.1% (13th)
59	August 29, 2017	8.1% (15th)	6.9% (19th)	(NR)	6.7% (18th)
60	August 29, 2017	9.9% (9th)	8.2% (11th)	7.6% (11th)	7.6% (12th)
61	September 4, 2017	8.6% (15th)	7.7% (14th)	6.3% (NR)	(NR)
62	September 4, 2017	10.3% (9th)	9.2% (8th)	7.6% (17th)	7.4% (14th)
63	September 5, 2017	8.5% (13th)	7.5% (12th)	7.8% (15th)	7.9% (12th)
64	September 5, 2017	9.3% (9th)	7.9% (8th)	9.5% (9th)	9.5% (6th)
65	September 11, 2017	8.6% (17th)	7.5% (19th)	7.1% (20th)	7.1% (18th)
66	September 11, 2017	10.6% (12th)	9.2% (10th)	8.2% (16th)	7.9% (15th)
67	September 12, 2017	11.1% (9th)	10.1% (8th)	6.6% (15th)	6.6% (16th)
68	September 12, 2017	12.3% (6th)	11.4% (5th)	8.4% (10th)	8.3% (10th)
69	September 18, 2017	7.8% (17th)	7.3% (17th)	6.6% (NR)	(NR)
70	September 18, 2017	9.8% (10th)	8.5% (12th)	8.1% (11th)	8.0% (15th)
71	September 19, 2017	8.1% (14th)	6.8% (17th)	7.3% (15th)	7.5% (13th)
72	September 19, 2017	10.6% (7th)	9.9% (8th)	9.1% (10th)	9.0% (9th)
73	September 25, 2017	8.4% (16th)	7.2% (16th)	6.1% (NR)	(NR)
74	September 25, 2017	10.6% (8th)	9.2% (9th)	8.4% (12th)	8.3% (14th)
75	September 26, 2017	8.6% (12th)	6.9% (14th)	6.2% (18th)	6.0% (19th)
76	September 26, 2017	10.6% (7th)	8.4% (8th)	8.0% (11th)	7.7% (11th)
77	October 2, 2017	3.1% (NR)	(NR)	2.7% (NR)	(NR)
78	October 2, 2017	7.6% (16th)	6.2% (17th)	6.4% (NR)	(NR)
79	October 3, 2017	3.2	(NR)	3.3	(NR)
80	October 3, 2017	7.5% (12th)	6.5% (11th)	7.1% (13th)	6.9% (13th)
81	October 9, 2017	7.4% (NR)	(NR)	5.4% (NR)	(NR)
82	October 9, 2017	9.6% (13th)	8.7% (15th)	7.1% (NR)	(NR)
83	October 10, 2017	8.7% (15th)	7.5% (15th)	6.8% (17th)	6.8% (18th)
84	October 10, 2017	10.9% (7th)	9.4% (9th)	8.5% (11th)	8.3% (11th)
85	October 16, 2017	8.5% (15th)	7.7% (19th)	5.9% (NR)	(NR)
86	October 16, 2017	9.9% (11th)	8.8% (12th)	7.4% (15th)	6.7% (19th)
87	October 17, 2017	8.4% (16th)	7.5% (13th)	7.0% (15th)	6.6% (17th)
88	October 17, 2017	11.3% (7th)	10.4% (8th)	9.4% (9th)	8.7% (9th)
89	October 30, 2017	7.7% (16th)	(NR)	6.2% (NR)	(NR)
90	October 30, 2017	9.7% (12th)	8.6% (12th)	8.1% (12th)	7.6% (15th)
91	October 31, 2017	8.0% (14th)	6.9% (19th)	6.9% (17th)	6.4% (10th)
92	October 31, 2017	10.1% (8th)	8.9% (8th)	8.6% (11th)	8.1% (13th)
93	November 6, 2017	8.2% (15th)	7.4% (14th)	6.4% (NR)	(NR)
94	November 6, 2017	10.2% (8th)	8.6% (11th)	7.6% (14th)	7.1% (14th)
95	November 7, 2017	8.5% (15th)	7.2% (14th)	7.0% (17th)	7.1% (15th)
96	November 7, 2017	11.0% (8th)	10.2% (7th)	8.8% (8th)	8.7% (8th)
97	November 13, 2017	8.6% (14th)	7.6% (13th)	6.4% (NR)	(NR)
98	November 13, 2017	10.3% (8th)	8.8% (10th)	7.8% (16th)	7.3% (18th)
99	November 14, 2017	8.3% (15th)	7.2% (11th)	7.0% (17th)	6.9% (16th)
100	November 14, 2017	9.8% (11th)	8.5% (8th)	8.6% (12th)	8.2% (12th)
Average		8.3%	%	6.7%	%

- Starting episode 40, the series was moved to Monday and Tuesday 20:55 time-slot with 2 episodes back-to-back.

== Awards and nominations ==
Year	Award	Category	Recipient	Result
2017	36th MBC Drama Awards	Excellence Award, Actor in a Soap Opera	Kang Kyung-joon	Won
2017	36th MBC Drama Awards	Excellence Award, Actor in a Soap Opera	Cha Do-jin	Nominated
2017	36th MBC Drama Awards	Excellence Award, Actress in a Soap Opera	Hahm Eun-jung	Nominated
2017	36th MBC Drama Awards	Excellence Award, Actress in a Soap Opera	Lee Joo-yeon	Nominated
2017	36th MBC Drama Awards	Golden Acting Award, Actor in a Soap Opera	Kim Byung-choon	Nominated
2017	36th MBC Drama Awards	Golden Acting Award, Actress in a Soap Opera	Kim Chung	Nominated
2017	36th MBC Drama Awards	Best New Actress	Hahm Eun-jung	Nominated
2017	36th MBC Drama Awards	Best New Actress	Lee Joo-yeon	Nominated
