= Jang Shin-young =

South Korean actress (born 1984)

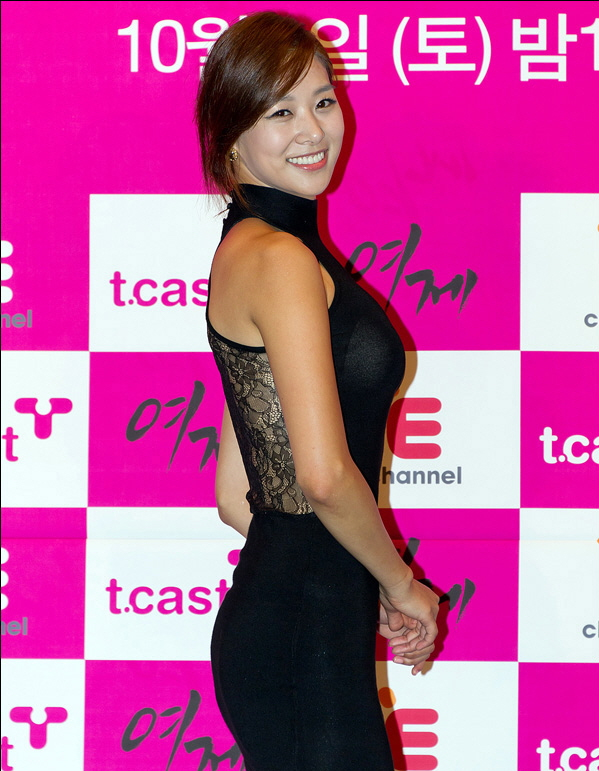
- Jang in 2011
- Born: January 17, 1984 (age 42); Jeonju, South Korea
- Education: Chung-Ang University – Theatre and Film (leave of absence)
- Occupation: Actress
- Years active: 2001–present
- Spouses: Wi Seung-cheol (m. 2006; div. 2009) Kang Kyung-joon (m. 2018)
- Children: 2

Korean name
- Hangul: 장신영
- RR: Jang Sinyeong
- MR: Chang Sinyŏng

Jang Shin-young (Korean: 장신영; born January 17, 1984) is a South Korean actress. She made her entertainment debut through a local beauty contest in 2001, and is best known for her portrayal of the femme fatale lead in the E Channel drama The Empress (2011). She was cast in the leading role in Flower of Revenge (2013), the first daily drama by cable station JTBC.

== Biography ==
She married Wi Seung-cheol, a marketing director at Bae Yong-joon's management agency BOF, on November 18, 2006. The couple divorced in 2009; they have a son.

In 2018, Jang announced she will marry for the second time to her Flower of Revenge co-star Kang Kyung-joon.

== Filmography ==
=== Television series ===
Year	Title	Role
2002	Wuri's Family	
2002	Story of Two Men	
2002	Sunrise House	Jung Yun-hee
2003	Forever Love	
2003	Pretty Woman	Kim So-yeon
2003	Desert Spring	In-hee
2005	Rebirth - NEXT	Kang Jung-hwa/Geum-young/Ah-hae/Young-sook/Yoo-ha
2007	Winter Bird	Hee-jin
2009	The Road Home	Han Suin
2010	I Am Legend	Kang Soo-in
2011	KBS Drama Special: "Perfect Spy"	Yoo-mi
2011	Gwanggaeto, The Great Conqueror	Yeon-hwa
2011	KBS Drama Special: "Linger"	Cho-yeon
2011	The Empress	Seo In-hwa
2011	Bride of the Sun	Kim Hyo-won
2012	The Chaser	Shin Hye-ra
2013	Flower of Revenge	Jeon Se-mi/Jennifer Dyer Mason/Choi Seo-yeon
2013	Empire of Gold	Yoon Seol-hee
2014	My Spring Days	Bae Ji-won
2015	My Heart Twinkle Twinkle	Lee Soon-jin
2017	Radiant Office	Jo Seok-kyung
2017–2018	Bad Guys 2	Kim Ae-kyung
2018	Suits	Na Joo-hee (cameo)
2019	Babel	Tae Yoo-ra
2022	Cleaning Up	Geum Jan-di
2025	The Woman Who Swallowed the Sun	Baek Seol-hee / Lucia Jung

=== Film ===
Year	Title	Role
2002	No Comment	
2004	Springtime	Su-yeon
2005	Red Eye	Oh Mi-sun
2010	First Love	
2010	The Piano in a Factory	Chen's wife
2010	The Outlaw	Han So-young

=== Music video appearances ===
- "Take a Drink With You" (Davichi, 2013)
- "Wash" (Seo In-young, 2011)
- "Wounded" (Min Kyung-hoon, 2010)
- "Ping" (Clazziquai Project, 2009)
- "어떻게 사람이 그래" (Noblesse, 2009)
- "Bye Bye Bye" (Monday Kiz, 2005)
- "A Thorn Tree That Loved Yearning" (Tei, 2005)
- "Did We Really Love" (Brown Eyed Soul, 2003)

=== Variety show ===
- Beauty Up (jTBC, 2012)
- Law of the Jungle W (SBS, 2012)
- Fashion of Cry (On Style, 2011)
- Fox's Butler (MBC, 2010)
- TV Entertainment Tonight (SBS, 2004–2005)
- Guesthouse Daughters (KBS, 2017)
- Same Bed, Different Dreams 2 - You Are My Destiny (SBS, 2017)
- Cooking - The Birth of a Cooking King (JTBC, 2021)

== Awards ==
- 2017 MBC Drama Awards: Golden Acting Award, Actress in a Miniseries (Radiant Office)
- 2012 SBS Drama Awards: Special Acting Award, Actress in a Miniseries (The Chaser)
- 2001 71st Miss Chunhyang Contest
