= Welcome to Waikiki =

2018 South Korean television series

- Promotional poster
- Hangul: 으라차차 와이키키
- RR: Eurachacha Waikiki
- MR: Ŭrach'ach'a Waik'ik'i
- Genre: Comedy; Slice of life
- Written by: Kim Ki-ho
- Directed by: Lee Chang-min
- Starring: Kim Jung-hyun; Lee Yi-kyung; Son Seung-won
- Music by: Park Se-joon
- Country of origin: South Korea
- Original language: Korean
- No. of episodes: 20

Production
- Executive producers: Baek Chang-ju; Hahm Young-hoon; Park Jin-hyung; Park Joon-seo
- Producer: Park Jong-eun
- Running time: 70 minutes
- Production companies: C-JeS Production; Drama House

Original release
- Network: JTBC
- Release: February 5 – April 17, 2018

Welcome to Waikiki (Korean: 으라차차 와이키키) is a 2018 South Korean television series starring Kim Jung-hyun, Lee Yi-kyung and Son Seung-won. It aired on JTBC from February 5 to April 17, 2018, every Monday and Tuesday at 23:00 (KST).

On June 6, 2018, it was renewed for a second season, which premiered on March 25, 2019.

== Synopsis ==
The story is about three men who come to run a failing guesthouse called Waikiki. Complications spark when their guesthouse is visited by a single mother and her baby.

== Cast ==
=== Main ===
- Kim Jung-hyun as Kang Dong-gu

A short-tempered young man that resembles an "icon of misfortune" who dreams of becoming a movie director. Picking himself up after a painful breakup, he starts working again, and later falls in love with Yoon-ah.

- Lee Yi-kyung as Lee Joon-ki

The son of an A-list actor who wants to follow the footsteps of his father but is stuck in minor roles. He is very determined to make it on his own and would go to great lengths in order to land better roles. He is allergic to walnut. He eventually sees Seo-jin as a woman.

- Son Seung-won as Bong Doo-sik

A kindhearted but timid freelance writer who barely receives work. He currently works in a convenience store and whiles his time away writing a web story.

- Jung In-sun as Han Yoon-ah

A single mother who ends up staying in the guesthouse with her daughter Sol in exchange for helping out. She makes the other residents uncomfortable with her quirky behavior and is prone to forgetting things and causing accidents. She initially wanted to be a rapper but later on studied in earnest to be a pastry chef. Afraid of trusting men again, she eventually agrees to be Dong-gu's girlfriend.

- Go Won-hee as Kang Seo-jin

Dong-gu's sister who wants to be a journalist but had difficulty landing a job. Joon-ki calls her Chewbacca, later on shortened to Bacca. Her facial hair is a source of embarrassment and she has to shave it regularly. She falls for and starts a relationship with Joon-ki in but hides it from her disapproving brother.

- Lee Joo-woo as Min Soo-ah

Dong-gu's ex-girlfriend and a famous model, who suddenly broke up with him. She ends up staying in the guesthouse when her new boyfriend ran away with all her money. She tries to make a comeback with Doo-sik's help.

=== Supporting ===
- Kang Kyung-joon as Song Hyun-joon (eps. 9–16)

A pastry chef, the owner of bakery, and an instructor in Yoon-ah's school, who is in love with Yoon-ah.

- Lee Jung-hyuk as Kim Woo-sung
- Ryu Hye-rin as Jin-joo
- Lee Ji-ha as Ji-soo's mother
- Kim Ji-sung as Ah-young
- Chang Ryul as Jang-yul

=== Special appearances ===
- Park Sung-woong as Park Sung-woong (ep. 1)

An actor.

- Seol Jung-hwan as Lee Yoon-suk (eps. 1–2, 10–11)

Soo-ah's boyfriend who is a con-artist.

- Han Ji-sang as Tae Hyun (eps. 2–3)

Seo-jin's college senior and first boyfriend.

- Go Min-si as Lee Min-ah (ep. 3)

Doo-sik's co-worker.

- Choi Ri as Ji-min (ep. 3)

Joon-ki's waxer.

- Kim Young-ok as Jang-gun's grandmother (ep. 4)
- Lee Deok-hwa as Lee Deok-hwa (ep. 4)

An actor and Joon-ki's father.

- Jason Scott Nelson as a hotel guest (ep. 4)
- Kim Seo-hyung as Kim Hee-Ja (ep. 4)

An actress.

- Jo Woo-ri as Sun-woo (ep. 5)

The daughter of Doo-sik's boss.

- Jin Ye-sol as Kwon Hye-jin (ep. 5)

A script writer who wanted to date Joon-ki.

- Jeon Soo-kyeong as the owner of Waikiki Guesthouse (ep. 6)
- Wheesung as Wheesung (ep. 6)

A wedding singer.

- Han Bo-bae as Yoon Mal-geum / Cherry

An adult movie actress and Doo-sik's first love. (eps. 7–9)

- Kang Kyun-sung as Kang Kyun-sung (ep. 10)

An actor playing as a masked octopus.

- Shin Seung-hwan as Min Soo-bong (ep. 11)

Soo-ah's brother and a UFC fighter.

- Tae In-ho as Kim Jae-woo (eps. 11–12)

A producer at JBC.

- Kim Byung-se as Park Chang-ho (ep. 12)

An announcer.

- Yoon Se-ah as Dong-gu's university club senior (ep. 12)
- Jung Soo-young as a department store person
- Kim Ki-hyeon as Min Ki-young (ep. 13)

An actor.

- Seo Yu-ri as Radio DJ Seo Yu-ri (ep. 13)
- Kang Hong-seok as Hong-suk (ep. 13)
- Shin Hyun-soo as Philip (ep. 16)

A model.

- Lee Ha-yool as Seo Jin-woo (ep. 16)

An actor.

- Olena Sidorchuk as Angela (ep. 17)
- HALO as ASTAR (ep. 18)

An idol group.

- Kim Kiri as MC Dacopy (ep. 19)

A rapper.

- Kim Jin-woo as Sol's father (ep. 20)
- Kim Ho-chang as Lee Sang-heon (ep. 6)

== Episodes ==
=== Series overview ===
| Season | Episodes | Originally released | |
| Season | Episodes | First released | Last released |
|---|---|---|---|
| 1 | 20 | February 5, 2018 | April 17, 2018 |
| 2 | 16 | March 25, 2019 | May 14, 2019 |

=== Welcome to Waikiki (2018) ===
| No. overall | No. in season | Title | Directed by | Written by | Original release date |
|---|---|---|---|---|---|
| 1 | 1 | "Episode 1" | Lee Chang-min | Kim Ki-ho | February 5, 2018 |
Kang Dong-goo, Lee Joon-ki and Bong Doo-sik run the struggling Waikiki guesthouse in Itaewon while trying to build careers in film and writing. Their financial problems become more complicated when they unexpectedly find an abandoned baby named Sol in one of the guest rooms. While the three men argue about what to do, Sol's mother Han Yoon-ah later appears and becomes connected with the household.
| 2 | 2 | "Episode 2" | Lee Chang-min | Kim Ki-ho | February 6, 2018 |
Yoon-ah tries to prove that she can contribute to the guesthouse while Dong-goo remains distracted by his former girlfriend Min Soo-ah. Meanwhile, Joon-ki's acting work leaves him stuck in elaborate costume makeup after a filming delay, creating new problems for the household.
| 3 | 3 | "Episode 3" | Lee Chang-min | Kim Ki-ho | February 12, 2018 |
The residents continue adjusting to Yoon-ah and Sol living at Waikiki while Dong-goo struggles with his feelings and the guesthouse's worsening financial condition. Joon-ki and Doo-sik continue pursuing unstable work in acting and writing, leading to another series of misunderstandings and comic problems.
| 4 | 4 | "Episode 4" | Lee Chang-min | Kim Ki-ho | February 13, 2018 |
Dong-goo becomes increasingly involved in Yoon-ah's problems despite trying to keep his distance, while Joon-ki continues taking unusual acting jobs. Doo-sik also encounters new difficulties as the residents try to keep the guesthouse operating.
| 5 | 5 | "Episode 5" | Lee Chang-min | Kim Ki-ho | February 19, 2018 |
Kang Seo-jin becomes discouraged after suffering a setback in her dream of becoming a journalist. At the same time, Doo-sik's attempt to advance his writing career places him in an awkward situation just as he becomes interested in a new coworker.
| 6 | 6 | "Episode 6" | Lee Chang-min | Kim Ki-ho | February 20, 2018 |
A man from Yoon-ah's baking class begins showing interest in her, making Dong-goo suspicious and jealous. Their attempts to manage the situation lead to another lie that forces them into an increasingly difficult misunderstanding.
| 7 | 7 | "Episode 7" | Lee Chang-min | Kim Ki-ho | February 26, 2018 |
After losing her home and money, Soo-ah turns to Dong-goo for help and ends up staying at Waikiki. Doo-sik unexpectedly meets a former classmate under embarrassing circumstances, while tensions and new relationships begin developing among the housemates.
| 8 | 8 | "Episode 8" | Lee Chang-min | Kim Ki-ho | February 27, 2018 |
Joon-ki considers an unusual performance opportunity after continuing to struggle as an actor. Dong-goo and Doo-sik both face problems involving their romantic feelings as life at Waikiki becomes more complicated.
| 9 | 9 | "Episode 9" | Lee Chang-min | Kim Ki-ho | March 5, 2018 |
Dong-goo worries that a mistake involving Sol has damaged his chances with Yoon-ah. Meanwhile, Joon-ki and Seo-jin's long-running habit of arguing with each other grows increasingly intense.
| 10 | 10 | "Episode 10" | Lee Chang-min | Kim Ki-ho | March 6, 2018 |
Joon-ki and Seo-jin disagree about what happened between them the previous night, leaving both confused about their relationship. Doo-sik and Soo-ah work together to confront Soo-ah's dishonest former boyfriend and expose his actions.
| 11 | 11 | "Episode 11" | Lee Chang-min | Kim Ki-ho | March 19, 2018 |
Soo-ah's intimidating older brother visits, forcing the residents to maintain a lie that had previously been created to reassure him. Their attempts to keep the truth hidden produce another series of misunderstandings.
| 12 | 12 | "Episode 12" | Lee Chang-min | Kim Ki-ho | March 20, 2018 |
The relationships inside Waikiki continue to change as Joon-ki and Seo-jin struggle with their feelings, while Dong-goo becomes increasingly attached to Yoon-ah. Doo-sik and Soo-ah continue dealing with problems created by their personal and professional lives.
| 13 | 13 | "Episode 13" | Lee Chang-min | Kim Ki-ho | March 26, 2018 |
The Waikiki residents continue facing work, family and romantic problems while trying to keep the guesthouse running. Dong-goo's feelings for Yoon-ah become more difficult to hide, and the others become involved in further misunderstandings.
| 14 | 14 | "Episode 14" | Lee Chang-min | Kim Ki-ho | March 27, 2018 |
Romantic tensions continue to grow among the residents of Waikiki, while Joon-ki's acting career and Doo-sik's writing ambitions bring new complications. Dong-goo struggles to decide how openly he should express his feelings for Yoon-ah.
| 15 | 15 | "Episode 15" | Lee Chang-min | Kim Ki-ho | April 2, 2018 |
The residents become involved in another series of misunderstandings as their romantic relationships develop. Dong-goo and Yoon-ah move closer to confronting their feelings, while Joon-ki, Seo-jin, Doo-sik and Soo-ah face their own problems.
| 16 | 16 | "Episode 16" | Lee Chang-min | Kim Ki-ho | April 3, 2018 |
Dong-goo becomes angry with the other residents after believing that they have all taken Yoon-ah's side against him. Doo-sik and Soo-ah become caught in another unpleasant situation, while Yoon-ah faces problems of her own.
| 17 | 17 | "Episode 17" | Lee Chang-min | Kim Ki-ho | April 9, 2018 |
After confirming that Yoon-ah has feelings for him, Dong-goo becomes increasingly insecure about their new relationship. Meanwhile, Doo-sik becomes interested in a Ukrainian guest staying at Waikiki.
| 18 | 18 | "Episode 18" | Lee Chang-min | Kim Ki-ho | April 10, 2018 |
Joon-ki reacts unexpectedly when he discovers that he has a stalker, while Doo-sik develops feelings for one of Soo-ah's friends. Dong-goo and Yoon-ah continue adjusting to their relationship.
| 19 | 19 | "Episode 19" | Lee Chang-min | Kim Ki-ho | April 16, 2018 |
Joon-ki is selected to throw the ceremonial first pitch at a baseball game, while Soo-ah begins working on her own fashion designs. Yoon-ah takes a baking qualification examination as she continues trying to build an independent future for herself and Sol.
| 20 | 20 | "Episode 20" | Lee Chang-min | Kim Ki-ho | April 17, 2018 |
Sol's biological father unexpectedly appears at Waikiki, forcing Yoon-ah and Dong-goo to confront what his return means for their relationship. Joon-ki and Seo-jin reconsider their future together, while Soo-ah begins acknowledging her feelings for Doo-sik. The residents face the latest crisis at Waikiki while continuing to pursue their personal and professional goals.

=== Welcome to Waikiki 2 (2019) ===
| No. overall | No. in season | Title | Directed by | Written by | Original release date |
|---|---|---|---|---|---|
| 21 | 1 | "Episode 1" | Lee Chang-min | Kim Ki-ho, Song Ji-eun, Song Mi-so and Seo Dong-bum | March 25, 2019 |
Lee Joon-ki continues running the financially troubled Waikiki guesthouse and brings his old high-school friends Cha Woo-sik and Kook Ki-bong into the business. Woo-sik is a struggling singer and Ki-bong is a minor-league baseball player, and the three men attempt to keep Waikiki operating while dealing with debt and unstable careers. Their lives become further complicated when Han Soo-yeon, their former classmate and Woo-sik's first love, unexpectedly becomes involved with them.
| 22 | 2 | "Episode 2" | Lee Chang-min | Kim Ki-ho, Song Ji-eun, Song Mi-so and Seo Dong-bum | March 26, 2019 |
Soo-yeon struggles to adjust after the sudden collapse of her former life and becomes increasingly dependent on the Waikiki residents. Woo-sik tries to hide his lingering feelings for her, while Joon-ki and Ki-bong continue dealing with problems in their acting and baseball careers.
| 23 | 3 | "Episode 3" | Lee Chang-min | Kim Ki-ho, Song Ji-eun, Song Mi-so and Seo Dong-bum | April 1, 2019 |
Woo-sik, Joon-ki and Ki-bong continue trying to make money and keep the guesthouse open while Soo-yeon begins rebuilding her life. Cha Yoo-ri and Kim Jung-eun also become more closely involved with the group, creating new personal and romantic complications.
| 24 | 4 | "Episode 4" | Lee Chang-min | Kim Ki-ho, Song Ji-eun, Song Mi-so and Seo Dong-bum | April 2, 2019 |
The Waikiki residents continue facing problems caused by their unstable jobs, financial difficulties and personal relationships. Woo-sik tries to manage his feelings for Soo-yeon while Joon-ki and Ki-bong encounter further setbacks in their careers.
| 25 | 5 | "Episode 5" | Lee Chang-min | Kim Ki-ho, Song Ji-eun, Song Mi-so and Seo Dong-bum | April 8, 2019 |
Soo-yeon attempts to become more independent while adapting to life at Waikiki. The others continue pursuing acting, music and sports careers, but their plans repeatedly create new misunderstandings and financial problems.
| 26 | 6 | "Episode 6" | Lee Chang-min | Kim Ki-ho, Song Ji-eun, Song Mi-so and Seo Dong-bum | April 9, 2019 |
Woo-sik's relationship with Soo-yeon becomes increasingly complicated as he tries to conceal his feelings for her. Meanwhile, Joon-ki and Ki-bong continue encountering embarrassing setbacks in their respective careers.
| 27 | 7 | "Episode 7" | Lee Chang-min | Kim Ki-ho, Song Ji-eun, Song Mi-so and Seo Dong-bum | April 15, 2019 |
The residents continue helping each other through financial and career problems while Soo-yeon tries to establish a new direction for herself. Personal feelings within the group become increasingly difficult to ignore.
| 28 | 8 | "Episode 8" | Lee Chang-min | Kim Ki-ho, Song Ji-eun, Song Mi-so and Seo Dong-bum | April 16, 2019 |
Woo-sik, Joon-ki and Ki-bong become involved in another series of mishaps as they pursue their careers and try to solve Waikiki's financial problems. Soo-yeon, Yoo-ri and Jung-eun also face new challenges in their work and relationships.
| 29 | 9 | "Episode 9" | Lee Chang-min | Kim Ki-ho, Song Ji-eun, Song Mi-so and Seo Dong-bum | April 22, 2019 |
The relationships among the Waikiki residents continue to develop while their attempts to earn money and improve their careers create further problems. Woo-sik remains conflicted about his feelings for Soo-yeon.
| 30 | 10 | "Episode 10" | Lee Chang-min | Kim Ki-ho, Song Ji-eun, Song Mi-so and Seo Dong-bum | April 23, 2019 |
The group struggles with new misunderstandings involving work, romance and money while continuing to maintain the guesthouse. Soo-yeon gradually becomes more confident as she develops a life separate from her former wealthy upbringing.
| 31 | 11 | "Episode 11" | Lee Chang-min | Kim Ki-ho, Song Ji-eun, Song Mi-so and Seo Dong-bum | April 29, 2019 |
Career setbacks and relationship problems continue affecting the residents of Waikiki. Woo-sik and Soo-yeon become increasingly aware of the emotional tension between them, while the others face difficulties of their own.
| 32 | 12 | "Episode 12" | Lee Chang-min | Kim Ki-ho, Song Ji-eun, Song Mi-so and Seo Dong-bum | April 30, 2019 |
The residents continue balancing their personal ambitions with the need to support the guesthouse and one another. New romantic developments and misunderstandings force several members of the group to reconsider their feelings.
| 33 | 13 | "Episode 13" | Lee Chang-min | Kim Ki-ho, Song Ji-eun, Song Mi-so and Seo Dong-bum | May 6, 2019 |
Woo-sik's feelings for Soo-yeon become harder to conceal while Joon-ki, Ki-bong, Yoo-ri and Jung-eun face important changes in their own careers and relationships. The future of Waikiki remains uncertain.
| 34 | 14 | "Episode 14" | Lee Chang-min | Kim Ki-ho, Song Ji-eun, Song Mi-so and Seo Dong-bum | May 7, 2019 |
The residents continue making decisions about their relationships and future careers as the series approaches its conclusion. Woo-sik and Soo-yeon move closer to resolving the feelings that have remained between them since their school years.
| 35 | 15 | "Episode 15" | Lee Chang-min | Kim Ki-ho, Song Ji-eun, Song Mi-so and Seo Dong-bum | May 13, 2019 |
The future of the guesthouse and the careers of its residents remain uncertain as several relationships reach turning points. Woo-sik must decide whether to be honest with Soo-yeon about his feelings.
| 36 | 16 | "Episode 16" | Lee Chang-min | Kim Ki-ho, Song Ji-eun, Song Mi-so and Seo Dong-bum | May 14, 2019 |
The residents face the final developments in their careers and relationships while continuing their efforts to keep Waikiki alive. Woo-sik and Soo-yeon resolve their feelings for one another, and the group moves forward with their lives while remaining connected through the guesthouse.

== Production ==
Ryu Hwa-young was first offered a major role, but declined. The first script reading of the cast was held on December 18, 2017, at the JTBC building in Sangam-dong.

On March 6, 2018, JTBC extended the series for four more episodes and aired two commentary specials in preparation for the extension.

== Original soundtrack ==
Welcome to Waikiki OST

Soundtrack album by Various artists
- Genre: Soundtrack
- Language: Korean
- Labels: Drama House; Sony Music

=== Part 1 ===
| No. | Title | Lyrics | Music | Artist | Length |
|---|---|---|---|---|---|
| 1. | "Waikiki Wonderland" (와이키키 원더랜드) | UK | UK | Ulala Session | 2:50 |
| 2. | "Waikiki Wonderland (Inst.)" (와이키키 원더랜드 (Inst.)) | | UK | | 2:50 |
| Total length: | | | | | 5:40 |

=== Part 2 ===
| No. | Title | Lyrics | Music | Artist | Length |
|---|---|---|---|---|---|
| 1. | "Wild Dream" | Kim Eana | Cho Hyung-woo, JeA | Cho Hyung-woo | 2:16 |
| 2. | "Wild Dream (Inst.)" | | Cho Hyung-woo, JeA | | 2:16 |
| Total length: | | | | | 4:32 |

=== Part 3 ===
| No. | Title | Lyrics | Music | Artist | Length |
|---|---|---|---|---|---|
| 1. | "Cheer Up" (잘하고있어) | Choi Sang-yeop, Park Se-joon | Park Se-joon, Woo Ji-hoon | Choi Sang-yeop | 3:50 |
| 2. | "Cheer Up (Inst.)" (잘하고있어 (Inst.)) | | Park Se-joon, Woo Ji-hoon | | 3:50 |
| Total length: | | | | | 7:40 |

=== Part 4 ===
| No. | Title | Lyrics | Music | Artist | Length |
|---|---|---|---|---|---|
| 1. | "Will You Come In" (들어와줄래) | KamDongis, Park Se-joon | KamDongis, Seo Jae-ha | Mind U | 3:24 |
| 2. | "Will You Come In (Inst.)" (들어와줄래 (Inst.)) | | KamDongis, Seo Jae-ha | | 3:24 |
| Total length: | | | | | 6:48 |

=== Part 5 ===
| No. | Title | Lyrics | Music | Artist | Length |
|---|---|---|---|---|---|
| 1. | "Fluttering Steps" (설레는 발걸음) | Park Se-joon, Han Joon | Park Se-joon, Lee Yoo-jin | Seunghee (Oh My Girl) | 3:20 |
| 2. | "Fluttering Steps (Inst.)" (설레는 발걸음 (Inst.)) | | Park Se-joon, Lee Yoo-jin | | 3:20 |
| Total length: | | | | | 6:40 |

== Viewership ==
Welcome to Waikiki : South Korea viewers per episode (thousands)

| Season | Episode number | | | | | | | | | | | | | | | | | | | |
| Season | 1 | 2 | 3 | 4 | 5 | 6 | 7 | 8 | 9 | 10 | 11 | 12 | 13 | 14 | 15 | 16 | 17 | 18 | 19 | 20 |
|---|---|---|---|---|---|---|---|---|---|---|---|---|---|---|---|---|---|---|---|---|
| 1 | N/A | N/A | N/A | N/A | N/A | N/A | N/A | N/A | 523 | N/A | N/A | N/A | N/A | N/A | N/A | N/A | 458 | 472 | N/A | 488 |

Source: Audience measurement performed nationwide by Nielsen Korea.

Average TV viewership ratings (nationwide)
| Ep. | Original broadcast date | Title | Average audience share | |
| Ep. | Original broadcast date | Title | Nielsen Korea | TNmS |
|---|---|---|---|---|
| 1 | February 5, 2018 | The New World (신세계) | 1.742% | 2.6% |
| 1 | February 5, 2018 | A Family is Born (가족의 탄생) | 1.742% | 2.6% |
| 2 | February 6, 2018 | Anyone Can Be a Wolverine (누구나 그렇게 울버린이 된다) | 1.861% | 2.2% |
| 2 | February 6, 2018 | You Know What? It's a Secret (있잖아요 비밀이에요) | 1.861% | 2.2% |
| 3 | February 12, 2018 | A Beautiful Farewell (아름다운 이별) | 1.743% | 1.8% |
| 3 | February 12, 2018 | Are You Still Dreaming? (그대 아직 꿈꾸고 있는가) | 1.743% | 1.8% |
| 4 | February 13, 2018 | You Did a Good Job (수고했어, 오늘도) | 1.635% | 2.2% |
| 4 | February 13, 2018 | His And Her Circumstances (그 남자 그 여자의 사정) | 1.635% | 2.2% |
| 5 | February 19, 2018 | Nothing's Wrong With You! (너는 문제없어!) | 1.595% | 1.9% |
| 5 | February 19, 2018 | Perfect Room to Recover (완전한 사육) | 1.595% | 1.9% |
| 6 | February 20, 2018 | Jealousy is My Power (질투는 나의 힘) | 1.589% | 2.1% |
| 6 | February 20, 2018 | Marriage is an Insane Act (결혼은 미친짓이다) | 1.589% | 2.1% |
| 7 | February 26, 2018 | The Girl We Loved (그 시절 우리가 사랑했던 소녀) | 1.733% | 2.4% |
| 7 | February 26, 2018 | When a Man Falls in Love (남자가 사랑할 때) | 1.733% | 2.4% |
| 8 | February 27, 2018 | A Cute Woman (귀여운 여인) | 2.242% | 2.6% |
| 8 | February 27, 2018 | For Love (사랑을 위하여) | 2.242% | 2.6% |
| 9 | March 5, 2018 | A Secret You Can't Tell (말할 수 없는 비밀) | 2.007% | 2.5% |
| 9 | March 5, 2018 | My Gangster Lover (내 깡패 같은 애인) | 2.007% | 2.5% |
| 10 | March 6, 2018 | My Love Olivia (내 사랑 올리비아) | 1.966% | 1.9% |
| 10 | March 6, 2018 | A Simple Confession (화려하지 않은 고백) | 1.966% | 1.9% |
| Special | March 12, 2018 | N/A | 1.091% | 1.8% |
| Special | March 13, 2018 | N/A | 1.291% | 1.8% |
| 11 | March 19, 2018 | Night Of The Living Dead (살아있는 시체들의 밤) | 1.837% | 2.7% |
| 11 | March 19, 2018 | I Love You So Much (진짜 진짜 좋아해) | 1.837% | 2.7% |
| 12 | March 20, 2018 | I'm a Woman Too (나도 여자랍니다) | 2.102% | 2.0% |
| 12 | March 20, 2018 | Life And Death Situation (사생결단) | 2.102% | 2.0% |
| 13 | March 26, 2018 | Secretly Greatly (은밀하게 위대하게) | 1.652% | 2.6% |
| 13 | March 26, 2018 | A Real Man (진짜 사나이) | 1.652% | 2.6% |
| 14 | March 27, 2018 | The Morning Dew in Colombia (콜롬비아의 아침이슬) | 1.582% | 2.2% |
| 14 | March 27, 2018 | No Matter How Much I Think About You (아무리 생각해도 난 너를) | 1.582% | 2.2% |
| 15 | April 2, 2018 | Hide And Seek (숨바꼭질) | 1.590% | 1.9% |
| 16 | April 3, 2018 | Their Wretched Love (이 죽일놈들의 사랑) | 1.543% | 1.8% |
| 16 | April 3, 2018 | A Simple Confession 2 (화려하지 않은 고백2) | 1.543% | 1.8% |
| 17 | April 9, 2018 | For New Couples (시작하는 연인들을 위하여) | 1.941% | 2.2% |
| 17 | April 9, 2018 | Can Love Be Translated? (사랑도 통역이 되나요?) | 1.941% | 2.2% |
| 18 | April 10, 2018 | Stalker (스토커) | 2.069% | 2.0% |
| 18 | April 10, 2018 | Dancing With Elizabeth (엘리자베스와 춤을) | 2.069% | 2.0% |
| 19 | April 16, 2018 | The Dancer in the Dark (어둠 속의 댄서) | 1.616% | 2.3% |
| 19 | April 16, 2018 | Misfortune Always Comes (불행은 언제나) | 1.616% | 2.3% |
| 20 | April 17, 2018 | Because It Hurts (아프니까 으라차차) | 2.081% | 2.3% |
| Average | | | 1.806% | 2.2% |
In the table above, the blue numbers represent the lowest ratings and the red numbers represent the highest ratings.; This series aired on a cable channel/pay TV which normally has a relatively smaller audience compared to free-to-air TV/public broadcasters (KBS, SBS, MBC and EBS).; Episode 10 was cut into two parts for the preparation of the extension of the show.; Episodes 11 and 12 did not air as originally planned on March 12 and 13, 2018. Instead, they were aired a week later on March 19 and 20. The one-week delay was to allow time for better production. A special episode was broadcast on March 12 and 13, featuring behind-the-scenes footage and commentary by the performers.

== Remake ==
A Vietnamese remake titled Nhà trọ Balanha aired in 2020 on VTV3.
