= Cha Do-jin =

South Korean actor (born 1983)

- Born: Im Sung-kyu; July 15, 1983 (age 43); Yecheon County, North Gyeongsang Province, South Korea
- Occupation: Actor
- Years active: 2007–present

Korean name
- Hangul: 임성규
- RR: Im Seonggyu
- MR: Im Sŏnggyu

Stage name
- Hangul: 차도진
- RR: Cha Dojin
- MR: Ch'a Tojin

Im Sung-kyu (Korean: 임성규; born July 15, 1983), better known by his stage name Cha Do-jin (차도진), is a South Korean actor. He is best known for his roles in the television dramas Empress Ki (2013–2014) and Sisters-in-Law (2017).

== Filmography ==
=== Film ===
Year	Title	Role	Notes	Ref.
2007	A Love	Sang-woo		
2008	Eye for an Eye	Cha Young-jae		
2013	Horny Family	Park Chan-hyuk		

=== Television series ===
Year	Title	Role	Notes	Ref.
2009	Friend, Our Legend	Doruko		
2010	Dr. Champ	Go Bum		
2010–2011	Athena: Goddess of War	Athena operative		
2011	The Duo	Jin-deuk		
2013	Samsaengi	Park Dong-woo		
2013–2014	Empress Ki	Tab Ja-hae		
2014	My Dear Cat	Cha Dong-woo	Cameo	
2015–2016	The Stars Are Shining	Hong Sung-guk		
2016	The Master of Revenge	Lee Ki-baek		
2016	You Are a Gift	Ma Do-jin		
2017	Sisters-in-Law	Park Min-ho		
2019	The Banker	Jo Young-kyung	Guest	

== Awards and nominations ==
Name of the award ceremony, year presented, category, nominee of the award, and the result of the nomination
Award ceremony	Year	Category	Nominated work	Result
MBC Drama Awards	2017	Excellence Award, Actor in a Soap Opera	Sisters-in-Law	Nominated
