= Lee Ha-yool =

South Korean actor (born 1987)

- Born: Lee Jong-ho; May 20, 1987 (age 39); Incheon, South Korea
- Other name: Lee Ha-yul
- Education: Seoul Institute of the Arts; Department of Acting (dropped out)
- Occupation: Actor
- Years active: 2011–present
- Agent: Ace Factory

Korean name
- Hangul: 이종호
- RR: I Jongho
- MR: I Chongho

Stage name
- Hangul: 이하율
- Hanja: 李河汩
- RR: I Hayul
- MR: I Hayul

Lee Ha-yool (born Lee Jong-ho on May 20, 1987) is a South Korean actor.

== Filmography ==
=== Television series ===
Year	Title	Role	Ref.
2011	Midnight Hospital	Kwon Dae-woong	
2011	Padam Padam	Lee Yoo-jin	
2012	KBS Drama Special: "Don't Worry, I'm a Ghost"	Kim Jin-soo	
2013	KBS TV Novel: "Eunhui"	Choi Myung-ho	
2014	Angel Eyes	Kim Jin-soo	
2014	Diary of a Night Watchman	Dae-ho	
2015	Splendid Politics	Lee Ji	
2015	The Stars Are Shining	Yoon Jong-hyun	
2015	The Three Witches	Jin Tae-won	
2016	KBS Drama Special: "Pinocchio's Nose"	Kang In-gook	
2016	Person Who Gives Happiness	Seo Suk-jin	
2018	Welcome to Waikiki	Seo Jin-woo	
2018	Ping Pong Ball		
2018	My Secret Terrius	Jung In-soo	
2018	The Third Charm	Kang Cheol-Nam	
2018	Ms. Ma, Nemesis	Detective Cheon Do-su	
2019	Designated Survivor: 60 Days	Kim Jun-oh	
2020	Search	Park Ki-hyung	
2022	Eve	Jang Jin-wook	
2022	Insider	Kim Woo-jae	
2022	Alchemy of Souls	Sang-ho	
2023	Our Blooming Youth	Crown Prince Uihyeon	
2024	Cinderella at 2 AM	Kim Hyo-Seong	
2025	Kick Kick Kick Kick	Camper 1	
2025	The Price of Confession	Lee Ki-dae	

=== Films ===
Year	Title	Role	Ref.
2012	The Heaven is Only Open to the Single!	Jin-woo	
2018	Faceless Boss	Park Tae-gyu	

=== Music video appearances ===
Year	Song title	Artist	Ref.
2012	"Bloom"	Gain	

== Awards and nominations ==
Year	Award	Category	Nominated work	Result	Ref.
2015	34th MBC Drama awards	Best Actor	The Stars are Shining	Nominated	
2017	36th MBC Drama Awards	Excellence Award, Actor in a Soap Opera	Person Who Gives Happiness	Nominated	
