= Love & Secret =

- Promotional poster
- Genre: Romance; Corporate; Family; Melodrama
- Written by: Kim Kyung-hee
- Directed by: Park Man-young
- Starring: Shin So-yul; Kim Heung-soo
- Music by: Choi In-hee
- Country of origin: South Korea
- Original language: Korean
- No. of episodes: 102

Production
- Executive producer: Jung Hae-ryong
- Running time: 35 minutes
- Production company: iWill Media

Original release
- Network: KBS2
- Release: November 11, 2014 – April 3, 2015

Love & Secret (Korean: 달콤한 비밀; RR: Dalkomhan bimil; lit. 'Sweet Secret') is a 2014 South Korean daily drama starring Shin So-yul and Kim Heung-soo. It aired on KBS2 from November 11, 2014 to April 3, 2015 on Mondays to Fridays at 19:50 for 102 episodes.

== Plot ==
Han Ah-reum, the daughter of the Korean Vice-Minister for Culture, returns home with a child born out of wedlock, a fact that will shame her family and ruin the chances of her father becoming the Minister for Culture. Cheon Sung-woon, heir of the Winner fashion and clothing company, is being backed into an arranged marriage that he does not want. When the paths of the two cross and re-cross, initial hostility turns into love. However, the secret of Ah-reum's illegitimate daughter may become a barrier to true love.

== Cast ==
=== Main characters ===
- Shin So-yul as Han Ah-reum

Fashion student who was pregnant with Phillip's daughter, Tiffany, but was abandoned by him. She becomes a single mother despite the stigma that it brings, and later becomes a designer at Winner's in order to provide for her daughter, where she meets and falls in love with Cheon Sung-woon.

- Kim Heung-soo as Cheon Sung-woon

Director of the Winner's Group, he falls in love with Ah-reum and breaks off an arranged marriage with Go Yoon-yi. He persists in wanting to marry Ah-reum even after it is discovered that she is a single mother.

- Yang Jin-woo as Phillip Choi

Hedge fund manager who abandons Ah-reum for a financially more lucrative marriage, but seeks a divorce from his wife once he has extracted what he wants from it. When Ah-reum rejects him, he becomes obsessed with winning her back, and taking custody of Tiffany. He uses Winner's need for expansion capital to manipulate Sung-woon and Ah-reum

- Yeon Min-ji as Go Yoon-yi

Corporate lawyer, and Sung-woon's friend since childhood. She is from an impoverished background, and Sung-woon's family paid for her education with the intention of marrying her to him. When Sung-woon breaks off their engagement, she helps Phillip and betrays Winner's in order to drive Sung-woon and Ah-reum apart.

=== Supporting characters ===
Han family

- Jung Dong-hwan as Han Pan-suk

Ah-reum's father, the vice-minister for culture and candidate to become minister. He ruins his career and reputation for probity in order to protect Ah-reum.

- Kim Hye-ok as Oh Myung-hwa

Ah-reum's mother, a housewife who suffers early onset dementia, which Phillip uses to snatch Tiffany and paint Ah-reum as an unfit mother.

- Son Seung-won as Han Jin-woo

Ah-reum's younger brother, a medical student and talented singer.

- Park Joon-myun as Oh Sun-hwa
- Choi Seung-kyung as Kwon Young-soo
- Yang Han-yeol as Kwon Hyuk-min

Chun family

- Kim Eung-soo as Chun Do-hyung
- Hwang In-young as Lee Soo-ah
- Heo Jin as Lee Hae-bang
- Jo Hyun-do as Chun Sung-ho

Extended cast

- Jo Hyun-sik as Secretary Jang
- Im Baek-chun as Kim Sung-chul
- Yoo Hee-do as Woo Sang-joon
- Son Se-bin as Heo Anna

== Ratings ==
- The blue numbers represent the lowest ratings and the red numbers represent the highest ratings
- NR denotes that the drama did not rank in the top 20 daily programs on that date

Episode #	Original broadcast date	Average audience share			
Episode #	Original broadcast date	TNmS Ratings		AGB Nielsen	
Episode #	Original broadcast date	Nationwide	Seoul National Capital Area	Nationwide	Seoul National Capital Area
1	2014/11/11	14.6%	14.4%	14.5%	15.4%
2	2014/11/12	18.1%	16.8%	17.3%	17.6%
3	2014/11/13	16.0%	15.3%	16.4%	17.3%
4	2014/11/14	15.9%	15.3%	15.8%	16.5%
5	2014/11/17	18.2%	18.3%	18.6%	19.3%
6	2014/11/18	16.8%	17.0%	15.4%	
7	2014/11/19	17.4%	17.1%	17.7%	17.8%
8	2014/11/20	17.4%	17.0%	16.8%	17.6%
9	2014/11/24	17.7%	16.7%	17.2%	18.1%
10	2014/11/25	16.8%	16.2%	16.9%	18.1%
11	2014/11/26	18.2%	16.8%	17.7%	
12	2014/11/27	17.5%	16.1%	17.3%	17.8%
13	2014/11/28	17.5%	16.4%	16.7%	16.8%
14	2014/12/01	18.2%	17.9%	18.6%	18.9%
15	2014/12/02	17.2%	16.8%	17.7%	18.1%
16	2014/12/03	18.6%	17.7%	18.1%	18.6%
17	2014/12/04	19.5%	19.4%	19.2%	19.7%
18	2014/12/05	18.0%	16.8%	17.6%	17.3%
19	2014/12/08	19.1%	18.3%	18.7%	19.2%
20	2014/12/09	18.5%	18.6%	18.0%	19.3%
21	2014/12/10	19.4%	18.8%	18.5%	18.2%
22	2014/12/11	19.5%	20.1%	18.7%	19.2%
23	2014/12/12	16.6%	15.6%	18.1%	19.2%
24	2014/12/15	17.5%	16.8%	18.2%	19.8%
25	2014/12/16	17.8%	17.7%	17.3%	17.6%
26	2014/12/17	19.4%	19.0%	18.7%	18.8%
27	2014/12/18	17.8%	17.1%	19.2%	19.7%
28	2014/12/19	17.8%	17.8%	16.7%	17.6%
29	2014/12/22	19.2%	18.0%	19.2%	19.0%
30	2014/12/23	18.8%	18.5%	16.9%	16.7%
31	2014/12/24	16.9%	16.1%	18.0%	18.3%
32	2014/12/25	20.0%	18.3%	20.3%	21.1%
33	2014/12/26	19.6%	19.7%	19.6%	19.5%
34	2014/12/29	19.9%	20.5%	19.8%	19.9%
35	2014/12/30	19.4%	19.1%	19.0%	19.1%
36	2014/12/31	18.7%	19.5%	18.2%	17.8%
37	2015/01/01	21.2%	21.3%	20.8%	20.2%
38	2015/01/02	18.9%	19.1%	17.9%	17.5%
39	2015/01/05	19.6%	20.0%	20.4%	21.0%
40	2015/01/06	20.7%	20.8%	20.0%	19.9%
41	2015/01/07	18.3%	17.0%	17.6%	17.2%
42	2015/01/08	18.9%	19.2%	20.1%	21.1%
43	2015/01/09	19.2%	18.6%	19.3%	19.6%
44	2015/01/12	18.1%	17.1%	18.8%	19.6%
45	2015/01/13	18.0%	17.4%	18.4%	18.8%
46	2015/01/14	19.6%	18.6%	19.5%	19.9%
47	2015/01/15	20.2%	19.4%	18.7%	19.6%
48	2015/01/16	18.2%	18.7%	18.3%	18.4%
49	2015/01/19	19.6%	19.2%	19.2%	19.6%
50	2015/01/20	18.5%	17.9%	18.6%	18.9%
51	2015/01/21	18.6%	17.5%	18.8%	18.3%
52	2015/01/22	19.0%	17.9%	18.6%	18.9%
53	2015/01/23	17.2%	16.3%	16.9%	17.4%
54	2015/01/26	16.6%	16.4%	16.9%	16.5%
55	2015/01/27	19.9%	18.2%	19.4%	19.5%
56	2015/01/28	19.5%	18.5%	17.7%	17.2%
57	2015/01/29	19.4%	18.0%	18.3%	18.9%
58	2015/01/30	18.3%	17.4%	17.1%	16.8%
59	2015/02/02	20.2%	19.3%	20.1%	20.2%
60	2015/02/03	20.7%	19.5%	19.1%	18.3%
61	2015/02/04	18.3%	16.8%	18.2%	17.6%
62	2015/02/05	18.8%	18.2%	17.0%	16.7%
63	2015/02/06	16.3%	15.2%		14.7%
64	2015/02/09	19.4%	18.2%	17.2%	16.9%
65	2015/02/10	20.0%	18.5%	17.7%	17.4%
66	2015/02/11	18.6%	17.0%	16.1%	14.9%
67	2015/02/12	19.1%	18.9%	18.1%	17.9%
68	2015/02/13	18.1%	17.3%	16.8%	16.4%
69	2015/02/16	19.4%	18.3%	19.7%	19.8%
70	2015/02/17	18.0%	18.3%	18.2%	18.9%
71	2015/02/18	15.6%	16.0%	14.9%	14.2%
72	2015/02/19	14.5%	14.5%	12.6%	11.9%
73	2015/02/20	15.9%	15.0%	14.7%	14.2%
74	2015/02/23	19.1%	18.9%	18.2%	19.3%
75	2015/02/24	20.2%	19.3%	19.8%	20.3%
76	2015/02/25	18.8%	16.2%	18.3%	17.8%
77	2015/02/26	17.7%	16.0%	17.6%	18.3%
78	2015/02/27	19.3%	19.2%	18.5%	19.6%
79	2015/03/02	18.8%	18.4%	18.7%	19.8%
80	2015/03/03	21.6%	21.0%	19.7%	20.6%
81	2015/03/04	18.7%	16.6%	17.9%	17.4%
82	2015/03/05	18.4%	17.7%	18.5%	18.3%
83	2015/03/06	19.2%	18.5%	17.7%	18.5%
84	2015/03/09	19.4%	18.7%	19.4%	19.7%
85	2015/03/10	20.0%	19.7%	18.7%	18.5%
86	2015/03/11	17.9%	16.6%	18.2%	
87	2015/03/12	18.6%	17.4%	19.3%	20.0%
88	2015/03/13	19.2%	17.6%	17.9%	17.7%
89	2015/03/16	18.3%	17.5%	18.3%	18.1%
90	2015/03/17	19.3%	18.7%	20.0%	19.8%
91	2015/03/18	17.9%	17.1%	17.9%	17.3%
92	2015/03/19	19.2%		18.2%	17.8%
93	2015/03/20	18.1%	17.9%	17.3%	17.1%
94	2015/03/23	18.8%	17.8%	18.9%	19.1%
95	2015/03/24	21.0%	18.9%	20.1%	20.5%
96	2015/03/25	19.1%	17.4%	18.5%	18.4%
97	2015/03/26	19.6%	19.3%	19.0%	
98	2015/03/30	20.9%	17.6%	19.2%	19.4%
99	2015/03/31	19.9%	17.7%	19.4%	19.0%
100	2015/04/01	21.3%	18.8%	20.0%	19.4%
101	2015/04/02	21.4%	19.6%	21.1%	21.6%
102	2015/04/03	22.3%	21.5%	19.8%	19.5%
Average		18.67%	17.92%	18.19%	18.36%

- Episodes 71-73 affected by Korean New Year

== Awards and nominations ==
Year	Award	Category	Recipient	Result
2014	28th KBS Drama Awards	Excellence Award, Actor in a Daily Drama	Kim Heung-soo	Nominated
2014	28th KBS Drama Awards	Excellence Award, Actress in a Daily Drama	Shin So-yul	Won
2014	28th KBS Drama Awards	Best New Actress	Shin So-yul	Nominated

== International broadcast ==
The series aired, one week after initial broadcast, on KBS World with subtitles.
