= Red Eye (2005 South Korean film) =

- Poster for "Red Eye"
- Hangul: 레드아이
- RR: Redeuai
- MR: Redŭai
- Directed by: Kim Dong-bin
- Written by: Lee Yong-yeon; Seong Gi-young
- Produced by: Kim Nam-hee
- Starring: Jang Shin-young; Song Il-kook; Lee Dong-gyu; Kim Hye-na; Kwak Ji-min
- Edited by: Shin Min-gyeong
- Music by: Mun Dae-hyeon
- Distributed by: Big Blue Film
- Release date: February 4, 2005
- Running time: 98 minutes
- Country: South Korea
- Language: Korean
- Budget: $5 million

Red Eye (Korean: 레드아이) is a 2005 South Korean horror film.

== Plot ==
July 16, 1988 a night train (or "red eye") to Yeosu leaves Seoul station and crashes killing 250 people. 15 years later to the day, a train is running the same line for the last time. But it has incorporated some of the coaches from the old crashed train.

A stewardess named OH Mi-sun (Jang Shin-young) has just started the job and is working on said train. Her father was a guard who died on the crashed train 15 years ago, and some blamed him for it. Mi-sun has psychic powers that were previously unknown to her, and starts getting glimpses of the spirits of those who died in the crash fifteen years prior.

Unsettling incidents occur and two passengers are murdered by supernatural means. With two dead bodies the train is supposed to stop at a station for the police, but it goes through the station because of a crazy young couple who are intent on crashing the train. They were the two tiny children (brother and sister) who were in the first train crash with their parents.

Increasingly strange incidents occur as the lights go out in some carriages and the carriages suddenly look old and in another, lights shatter and glass falls on the passengers. The passengers do not know where to go to escape the coming crash since the back of the train is no longer safe. Mi-Sun tries to stop them from crashing the train.

Mi-sun has gained knowledge from contact with a dead form which rose from a black puddle in one of the carriages and tells them that they are both dead, and that they now inhabit the bodies of other people. Also that their father and his wife planned to kill themselves and the children on that train 15 years ago but the poison he was going to use was ruined by a stewardess JUNG Jin-sook (Kim Hyeon-suk) when she accidentally kicked the jar it was in, so he got into the driver's cabin and put the train on a collision course with another train, causing the terrible wreck over a decade ago.

In anger the brother smashes Mi-sun's head hard four times against the window causing her to collapse with bleeding to the head but he knows it is true as his sister regresses to a little girl again. The spirit of Mi-sun's father enters the driver's cabin and pilots the train harmlessly through the train that it was on a collision with and the crazy man reverts to a scared child comforting his sister. As the trains, natural and supernatural begin to part, things start getting back to normal on the train with the ghosts disassembling, the old carriages becoming normal again and the human passengers start coming out of hiding.

Mi-sun's father comforts her as she dies from her injuries. The train is finally stopped and it is daylight and the bewildered people get off.

The scene changes to night again and the train for Yeosu arrives in Seoul station for its last run. We see Mi-sun on the platform, and she is again a stewardess on this train on its unnatural journey.

The white end titles are rolled up against a night background that a driver would see from the cabin of the train.
