= Go Won-hee =

South Korean actress (born 1994)

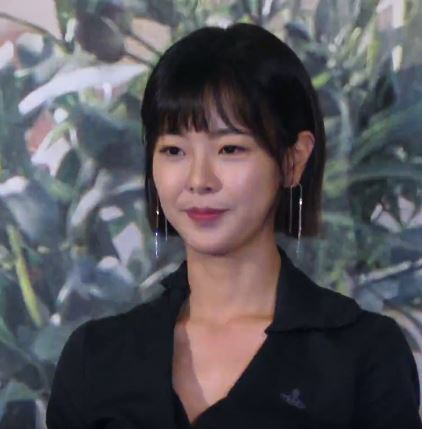
- Go in 2018
- Born: Kim Won-hee; September 12, 1994 (age 31); South Korea
- Education: Chung-Ang University
- Occupation: Actress
- Years active: 2011–present
- Agent: SBD
- Spouse: Unknown (m. 2022; div. 2025)

Korean name
- Hangul: 김원희
- RR: Gim Wonhui
- MR: Kim Wŏnhŭi

Stage name
- Hangul: 고원희
- RR: Go Wonhui
- MR: Ko Wŏnhŭi

Kim Won-hee (Korean: 김원희; born September 12, 1994), better known by the stage name Go Won-hee (Korean: 고원희), is a South Korean actress. She is known for her role in the television series The Stars Are Shining (2015–2016), Strongest Deliveryman (2017), Perfume (2019), and King the Land (2023).

== Career ==
Go was an idol trainee who was set to debut with girl group Fiestar but instead decided to focus on modeling and acting. She began her entertainment career as a commercial model in 2011, and became the youngest ever model for Asiana Airlines in 2012.

She then began acting, and has since starred in films and television dramas such as Blooded Palace: The War of Flowers (2013), My Dear Cat (2014), and Tabloid Truth (2014).

In 2015, she joined the cast of sketch comedy/variety show Saturday Night Live Korea.

== Personal life ==
On September 16, 2022, Go's agency confirmed that Go would marry her older non-celebrity boyfriend. They married in a private ceremony on October 7, 2022, at Hotel Shilla in Seoul, attended by their parents and friends of both families. On November 25, 2025, her agency announced her divorce after two years of marriage. It was also revealed that the couple never registered their marriage, and thus, were in a common-law marriage.

== Filmography ==
=== Film ===
| Year | Title | Role | Notes | Ref. |
|---|---|---|---|---|
| 2011 | A Sailor Went to Sea | | | |
| 2012 | Don't Click | | | |
| 2012 | Natural Burials | Chung-ah (young) | Released in theater and as television series | |
| 2014 | Tabloid Truth | Choi Mi-jin | | |
| 2015 | The Silenced | Shizuko | | |
| 2018 | After My Death | Han-sol | | |

=== Television series ===
| Year | Title | Role | Notes | Ref. |
|---|---|---|---|---|
| 2012 | Natural Burials | Chung-ah (young) | Released in theater and as television series | |
| 2013 | Blooded Palace: The War of Flowers | Queen Jangnyeol | | |
| 2013 | Medical Top Team | Yoo Na-yeon | Cameo | |
| 2014 | Cheo Yong | | | |
| 2014 | My Dear Cat | Shin Ji-eun | | |
| 2015 | The King's Face | Queen Inmok | | |
| 2015 | The Time We Were Not in Love | Yoon Min-ji | | |
| 2015 | The Stars Are Shining | Jo Bong-hee | | |
| 2017 | Strongest Deliveryman | Lee Ji-yoon | | |
| 2017–2018 | The Best Moment to Quit Your Job | Yeon-ji | | |
| 2018 | Welcome to Waikiki | Kang Seo-jin | | |
| 2018 | Secret Queen Makers | Ahn Gong-joo | | |
| 2018 | Your House Helper | Yoon Sang-ah | | |
| 2019 | Perfume | Min Ye-Rin | | |
| 2019 | Flower Crew: Joseon Marriage Agency | Kang Ji-hwa | | |
| 2020 | Eccentric! Chef Moon | Yoo Yoo-jin / Yoo Bella | | |
| 2021 | Revolutionary Sisters | Lee Gwang-tae | | |
| 2021 | Nevertheless | a woman talking to Jae-eon | Cameo (episode 6) | |
| 2023 | King the Land | Oh Pyung-hwa | | |
| 2025 | Our Golden Days | Jeong Bo-ah | | |

=== Web series ===
| Year | Title | Role | Ref. |
|---|---|---|---|
| 2021 | A DeadbEAT's Meal | Yeo Eun-ho | |
| 2023 | Love to Hate You | Shin Na-eun | |

=== Television show ===
| Year | Title | Role | Ref. |
|---|---|---|---|
| 2015 | Saturday Night Live Korea - Season 6 | Cast member | |

=== Music video appearances ===
| Year | Song title | Artist | Ref. |
|---|---|---|---|
| 2011 | "Only Learned Bad Things" 못된 것만 배워서 | B1A4 | |
| 2012 | "Such a Man" 그런남자 | Ne;Mo | |
| 2013 | "One Spring Day" 어느 봄날 | 2AM | |

== Awards and nominations ==
Awards and nominations
| Year | Award | Category | Nominated work | Result | Ref. |
|---|---|---|---|---|---|
| 2015 | KBS Drama Awards | Excellence Award, Actress in a Daily Drama | The Stars Are Shining | Nominated | |
| 2017 | 10th Korea Drama Awards | Best New Actress | Strongest Deliveryman | Won | |
| 2019 | KBS Drama Awards | Excellence Award, Actress in a Miniseries | Perfume | Nominated | |
| 2019 | KBS Drama Awards | Netizen Award, Actress | Perfume | Nominated | |
| 2019 | KBS Drama Awards | Best Couple Award with Shin Sung-rok | Perfume | Nominated | |
