= Shin So-yul =

South Korean actress (born 1985)

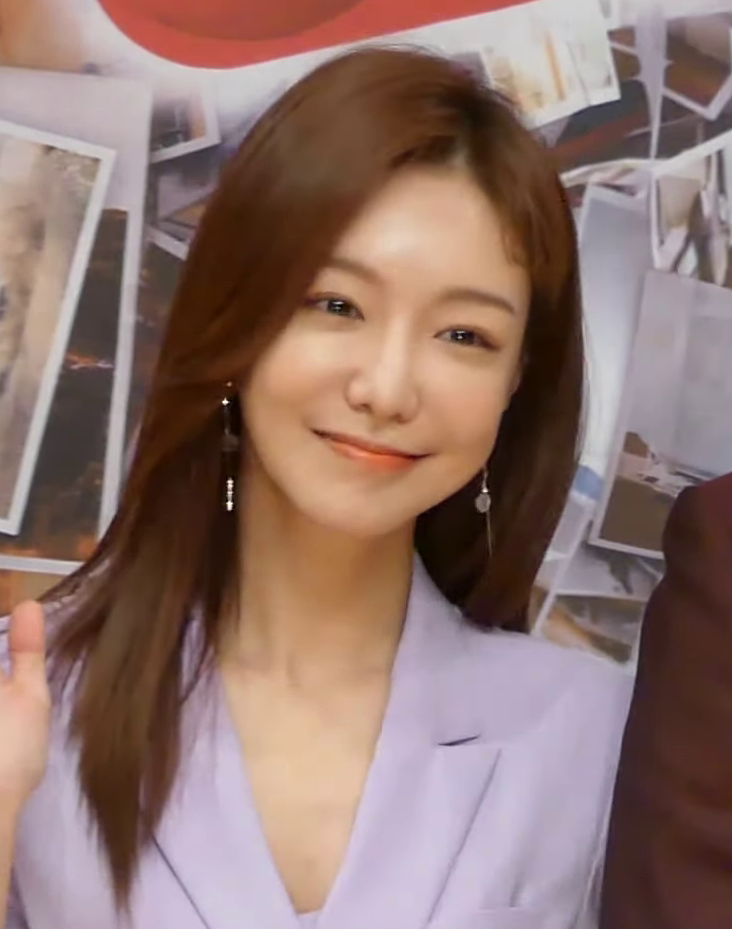
- Shin in 2019
- Born: Kim Jung-min; August 5, 1985 (age 41); Guro District, Seoul, South Korea
- Education: Kookmin University - Theater and Film
- Occupation: Actress
- Years active: 2004–present
- Agent: Never Die Entertainment
- Spouse: Kim Ji-chul (m. 2019)

Korean name
- Hangul: 김정민
- RR: Gim Jeongmin
- MR: Kim Chŏngmin

Stage name
- Hangul: 신소율
- RR: Sin Soyul
- MR: Sin Soyul

Shin So-yul (Korean: 신소율; born August 5, 1985), birth name Kim Jung-min, is a South Korean actress. Shin began acting in 2006, and appeared in supporting roles in films and television series such as Hello My Love, Jungle Fish 2, and Penny Pinchers. Her breakthrough would come in 2012 with the popular cable dramedy Reply 1997. In 2013, she received acting nominations from the Baeksang Arts Awards and the Grand Bell Awards for her risque role in romantic comedy film My PS Partner, and became one of the hosts of talk show Talk Club Actors. Shin played the leading role in the 2014 daily drama Love & Secret. In recent years, Shin became recognized for her supporting roles in various television dramas.

== Filmography ==
=== Film ===
Year	Title	Role	Notes/Ref.
2007	Shadows in the Palace	Subang gungnyeo ("palace maid who does embroidery")	
2007	My Love	Reporter	
2009	The Pit and the Pendulum	Min-jung	
2009	Hello My Love	Lee Ha-na	
2010	Lovers Vanished	Min-jung	
2010	The Haunted House Project	Ji-young	
2011	Penny Pinchers	Ha Kyung-joo	
2012	My PS Partner	So-yeon	
2013	Private Island	Na-na	
2014	Gyeongju	Da-yeon	
2014	The Royal Tailor	Wol-hyang	
2016	A Violent Prosecutor	Ha-na	
2017	The Merciless		Cameo
2018	The Pension	Ja-yeong	
2018	On Your Wedding Day	Kim So-jung	special appearance
2018	Passing Summer	Sung-hye	
2019	Forever	Lee So-yeon	
2020	Si, Nario	Oh Da-woon	
2020	The Therapist: Fist of Tae-baek	Bo-mi	
2021	A Long Day	Yoon-ju	
2023	Oksu Station Ghost	Tae-hee	
2026	Heartman: Rock and Love	Ji-woo	
TBA	To Heart	So-yeon	

=== Television series ===
Year	Title	Role	Notes/Ref.
2006	Someday	Yoon-deok's friend	
2006	Lovers	DO staff	
2007	H.I.T	Mean high school girl	Cameo
2010	Jungle Fish 2	Lee Ra-yi	
2011	Midas	Kwon Yi-ji	
2011	Deep Rooted Tree	Mok-ya	
2012	Reply 1997	Mo Yoo-jung	
2012	What Is Mom?	Shin So-yul	
2012	My Lover, Madame Butterfly	Girl on matchmaking date	Cameo
2012	Cheongdam-dong Alice	Choi Ah-jung	
2013	All About My Romance	Female student	Cameo
2013	Ugly Alert	Shin Joo-young	
2013	KBS Drama Special: "Jin Jin"	Jang Yoo-jin	one act-drama
2013	Reply 1994	Mo Yoo-jung	Cameo
2014	KBS Drama Special: "Playing Games"	Yoo Jin-ah	one act-drama
2014	Steal Heart	Han Da-young	
2014	Dodohara (Be Arrogant)	Do Ra-hee	
2014	Love & Secret	Han Ah-reum	KBS2
2015	Mrs. Cop	Choi Nam-jin	
2015	Six Flying Dragons	Mok-ya	special appearance
2016	Yeah, That's How It Is	Yoo So-hee	
2017–2018	Black Knight: The Man Who Guards Me	Kim Young-mi	
2018	Should We Kiss First?	An Hee-jin	
2018	Clean with Passion for Now	Seo Ji-hye	Cameo (episode 10)
2018	Coffee, Do Me a Favor	Hyun-woo's sister	
2019	Big Issue	Jang Hye-jung	
2020	Train	Lee Jung-min	
2020	SF8	Shin Ji-soo	Episode: "White Crow"
2020	Lonely Enough to Love	Kang Woo's patient	Cameo (episode 1)
2022	The Law Cafe	Da-young	Cameo (episode 12)
2023	KBS Drama Special: "Shoot For Love"	Han Ga-yeon	one act-drama
2024	Bitter Sweet Hell	Oh Ji-eun	

=== Web series ===
Year	Title	Role	Ref.
2015	The Big Dipper	Shin So-yul	
2016	Justice Team	Lee Bo-bae	

=== Variety/radio show ===
Year	Title	Notes/Ref.
2006	Hi Hi Hi	Reporter
2007	Super Fight Prism	Host
2010	Coco & Marc - Season 2	Host
2011	M! Countdown	Host
2011	Music Town	Host
2012	Olive Show - Home Cafe	Host
2012	Saturday Night Live Korea - Season 3	Host, episode 18
2013	Talk Club Actors	Host
2015	Real Men: Female Soldier Special - Season 3	Cast member
2018	Mimi Shop	Cast member
2022	Sisters' Share House (Season 1–2)	Host

=== Music video appearances ===
Year	Song title	Artist
2008	"Butterfly"	Loveholics
2011	"Top Star"	Tony An
2014	"Because of You"	Grey Dog feat. Shin So-yul
2014	"Winter in Haeundae"	Zizo
2016	"I Really Like You"	10cm

== Discography ==
=== Singles ===
Year	Song title	Artist	Notes
2010	"Feeling Sad (Farewell version)"	Lee Joon, Kim Bo-ra, Shin So-yul, Han Ji-woo, Hong Jong-hyun	Track from Jungle Fish 2 OST
2014	"Because of You"	Grey Dog feat. Shin So-yul	

== Awards and nominations ==
Year	Award	Category	Nominated work	Result
2011	6th Men's Health Cool Guy Contest	Vital Woman Award	—N/a	Won
2013	49th Baeksang Arts Awards	Best Supporting Actress	My PS Partner	Nominated
2013	21st Korean Culture and Entertainment Awards	Best New Actress in Film	My PS Partner	Won
2013	50th Grand Bell Awards	Best New Actress	My PS Partner	Nominated
2014	KBS Drama Awards	Excellence Award, Actress in a Daily Drama	Love & Secret	Won
2014	KBS Drama Awards	Best New Actress	Love & Secret, Playing Games	Nominated
