= A Daughter Just Like You =

2015 South Korean television series

- Promotional poster
- Genre: Family drama Romance
- Starring: Lee Soo-kyung; Kang Kyung-joon; Kim Hye-ok; Kil Yong-woo
- Country of origin: South Korea
- Original language: Korean
- No. of episodes: 120

Production
- Production location: South Korea
- Running time: 35 minutes Mondays to Fridays at 20:55 (KST)
- Production companies: CT E&C (formerly CT Pictures)

Original release
- Network: MBC
- Release: May 18 – November 16, 2015

A Daughter Just Like You (Korean: 딱 너 같은 딸) is a 2015 South Korean television series starring Lee Soo-kyung, Kang Kyung-joon, Kim Hye-ok and Kil Yong-woo. It aired on MBC on Mondays to Fridays at 20:55 for 120 episodes beginning May 18, 2015.

== Plot ==
Hong Ae-Ja (Kim Hye-Ok) works as a host at a home shopping channel. She has three accomplished daughters: Ji-Sung (Woo Hee-Jin), In-Sung (Lee Soo-Kyung) and Hee-Sung (Jung Hye-Seong). Hong Ae-Ja's family interconnects with So Pan-Seok's (Jung Bo-Suk) family and Heo Eun-Sook's (Park Hae-Mi) as in-laws.

== Cast ==
=== Hong Ae-ja's family ===
- Kim Hye-ok as Hong Ae-ja
- Kil Yong-woo as Ma Jung-ki (Ae-ja's husband)
- Woo Hee-jin as Ma Ji-sung (Ae-ja's oldest daughter)
  - Kim Hye-yoon as young Ma Ji-sung (Ep. 1)
- Lee Soo-kyung as Ma In-sung (Ae-ja's second daughter)
- Jung Hye-sung as Ma Hee-sung (Ae-ja's youngest daughter)

=== So Pan-suk's family ===
- Jeong Bo-seok as So Pan-suk
- Kang Kyung-joon as So Jung Geun (Pan-suk's eldest son)
  - Lee Gun-ha as young Jung Geun
- Jung Woo-shik as So Seung Geun (Pan-suk's second son)
- Jo Woo-ri as So Jung Yi (Pan-suk's youngest daughter)

=== Huh Eun-sook's family ===
- Park Hae-mi as Huh Eun-sook (Ji-sung's mother-in-law)
- Lee Byung-joon as Baek Min-suk (Ji-sung's father-in-law)
- Lee Ji-hoon as Baek Woo-jae (Ji-sung's husband)
- Yoon Jong-hoon as Bae Sun Jae

=== Others ===
- Jun Won-joo as Mal Nyun (Jung-ki's mother)
- Kang Sung-min as Kang Hyun Woo
- Go Yun-ah as Baek Mi Na (Ji-sung & Woo-jae's daughter)
- Han Seung-hyun as Sung Chan
- Joey Albright as Dave
- Choi Min
- Han Yeo-wool
- Lee Chang
- Kim Seo-kyung
- Ahn Byung-kyung
- Seo Kwang-jae
- Choi Jung-won as Ahn Jin Bong
