= Whatcha Wearin'? =

2012 film by Byun Sung-hyun

- Promotional poster for Whatcha Wearin'?
- Hangul: 나의 P.S. 파트너
- RR: Naui P.S. pateuneo
- MR: Naŭi P.S. p'at'ŭnŏ
- Directed by: Byun Sung-hyun
- Written by: Byun Sung-yun; Kim Min-soo
- Produced by: Im Sang-jin
- Starring: Ji Sung; Kim Ah-joong
- Cinematography: Choe Sang-ho
- Edited by: Kim Sang-bum; Kim Jae-bum
- Music by: Kim Hong-jib
- Distributed by: CJ Entertainment
- Release date: 6 December 2012
- Running time: 114 minutes
- Country: South Korea
- Language: Korean
- Budget: ₩3 billion
- Box office: US$12,490,864

Whatcha Wearin'? (Korean: 나의 P.S. 파트너; lit. 'My P.S. Partner') is a 2012 South Korean romantic comedy film, starring Ji Sung and Kim Ah-joong. It is about a woman who in an attempt to spice up her five-year relationship, tries to have phone sex with her boyfriend but accidentally gets another man on the line instead.

The film was released in theaters on December 6, 2012.

== Plot ==
Instead of calling her boyfriend, Yoon-jung accidentally calls a total stranger, Hyun-seung, a man who is having trouble getting over his ex-girlfriend. She ends up having phone sex with him and later, they become comfortable with each other and start talking about their respective relationship problems. They eventually decide to meet and a more intimate friendship develops, which leads to both falling for each other.

== Cast ==
- Ji Sung - Hyun-seung
- Kim Ah-joong - Yoon-jung
- Shin So-yul - So-yeon
- Kang Kyung-joon - Seung-joon
- Kim Sung-oh - Seok-woon
- Moon Ji-yoon - Young-min
- Jung Soo-young - Jin-joo
- Kim Bo-mi - Yoon-mi
- Kim Bo-yeon - Yoon-jung's mother
- Ok Ji-young - Soo-jung
- Lee Mi-so - Hye-rim
- Hwang Seung-eon - Choi Young-ah
- Kwak Ji-min - Ah-ra
- Kim Joo-ryung - "sea turtle"-faced woman
- Kim Jun-ho - restaurant waiter
- Shin Hae-chul - himself (cameo)

== Box office ==
Whatcha Wearin'? was the fastest rated-19 adult romantic comedy to hit the 1 million admissions mark, reaching its goal in only 10 days — a day faster than the previous record holders Sex Is Zero 2, My Scary Girl and Petty Romance. Total ticket sales amounted to 1,831,644, or a revenue of $12,376,644.

== Awards and nominations ==
2013 49th Baeksang Arts Awards

- Nomination - Best Supporting Actress - Shin So-yul

2013 50th Grand Bell Awards

- Nomination - Best New Actress - Shin So-yul
