= You Are a Gift =

South Korean television series

- Promotional poster
- Also known as: You Are My Present; You're My Special Gift; The Gifted
- Hangul: 당신은 선물
- RR: Dangsineun seonmul
- MR: Tangsinŭn sŏnmul
- Genre: Melodrama; Romance; Family; Revenge
- Created by: Hong Chang-wook
- Written by: Lee Moon-hwi; Oh Bo-hyun
- Directed by: Yoon Ryu-hae
- Starring: Heo Yi-jae; Cha Do-jin; Choi Myung-gil; Jin Ye-sol; Kim Cheong; Song Jae-hee; Shim Ji-ho
- Country of origin: South Korea
- Original language: Korean
- No. of episodes: 111

Production
- Executive producers: Kim Yong-jin; Park Jae-sam
- Producer: Park Kyung-ryul
- Running time: 38 minutes every Mondays to Fridays at 19:20 (KST)
- Production companies: Celltrion Entertainment (formerly Dream E&M); SBS Plus

Original release
- Network: SBS
- Release: 13 June – 24 November 2016

You Are a Gift (Korean: 당신은 선물; RR: Dangsineun seonmul) is a 2016 South Korean evening daily drama series starring Heo Yi-jae, Cha Do-jin, Choi Myung-gil, Jin Ye-sol, Kim Cheong, Song Jae-hee, and Shim Ji-ho. It aired on SBS from June 13 to November 24, 2016, airing every Monday to Friday evening at 19:20 for 111 episodes.

== Cast and characters ==
=== Main cast ===
- Heo Yi-jae as Kong Hyeon-soo
  - Park Ji-so as young Kong Hyeon-soo
- Cha Do-jin as Ma Doo-jin
- Choi Myung-gil as Eun Young-ae
- Jin Ye-sol as Kang Se-ra
- Kim Cheong as Cheon Tae-hwa
- Song Jae-hee as Ma Seong-jin
- Shim Ji-ho as Han Yoon-ho

=== People around Kong Hyeon-soo ===
- Sa Mi-ja as Choi Kang-ja
- Yoon Yoo-sun as Bok Soon-yi
- Im Ji-eun as Kong Eul-sook
- Jo Yi-hyun as Kong Han-sol

=== People around Ma Doo-jin ===
- Im Chae-moo as Ma Dong-sik
- Yoon Soo as Ma Yeo-jin

=== People around Kang Se-ra ===
- Bang Eun-hee as Yoo Mi-ran
- Lee Byung-joon as Kang Poong-ho

=== People around Han Yoon-ho ===
- Ahn Nae-sang as Professor Han

=== Extended cast ===
- Na Ya as Song Hyo-rim
- Kim Byung-se as Kim Chul-yong
- Kim Young-jae as Kong Gil-dong
- Kim Young-ok
- Seo Jin-wook
- Choi Dae-hoon as Detective Hwang
- Jung Hyun-seok
- Go Myung-hwan as Mr. Lee
- Way as Kyungha (the gossiping office worker In Kang Se-ra's team)
- Lee Kyu-seob
- Hong Seo-joon as Kim Seo-joon
- Lee Jeong-seong
- Uhm Seo-hyun
