= Gracious Revenge =

2019 South Korean television series

- Promotional poster
- Also known as: Perfect Mother and Daughter; Elegant Mother and Daughter
- Hangul: 우아한 모녀
- RR: Uahan monyeo
- MR: Uahan monyŏ
- Genre: Melodrama; Revenge; Family; Romance
- Created by: KBS Drama Division
- Written by: Oh Sang-Hee
- Directed by: Eo Soo-Sun
- Starring: Choi Myung-gil; Cha Ye-ryun; Kim Heung-soo; Oh Chae-yi
- Composer: Lee Chang-hee
- Country of origin: South Korea
- Original language: Korean
- No. of episodes: 103

Production
- Executive producer: Moon Jun-ha (KBS)
- Producer: Lee Daekyung
- Running time: 40 minutes
- Production company: IWill Media

Original release
- Network: KBS2
- Release: November 4, 2019 – March 27, 2020

Gracious Revenge (Korean: 우아한 모녀; RR: Uahan monyeo) is a 2019 South Korean television series starring Choi Myung-gil, Cha Ye-ryun, Kim Heung-soo, and Oh Chae-yi. It aired on KBS2 every weekday at 19:50 (KST) starting November 4, 2019.

== Synopsis ==
The series focuses on a woman whose dangerous love life is introduced after she was raised as a tool for her mother's revenge.

== Cast ==
- Choi Myung-gil as Jung Mi-ae/Cha Mi-yeon/Carry Jung
- Cha Ye-ryun as Han Yu-jin/Janice
- Kim Heung-soo as Goo Hae-jun
- Oh Chae-yi as Hong Se-ra
- Kim Do-yeon as Prisoner

== Viewership ==
- In this table, the blue numbers represent the lowest ratings and the red numbers represent the highest ratings.
- N/A denotes that the rating is unknown.
- The latest episode achieved 2.9 million views nationwide.

Ep.	Original broadcast date	TNmS	AGB Nielsen	
Ep.	Original broadcast date	Nationwide	Nationwide	Seoul
2019
1	November 4	14.0%	10.4%	9.0%
2	November 5	14.9%	9.9%	7.5%
3	November 6	12.3%	10.9%	9.1%
4	November 7	13.1%	9.9%	8.4%
5	November 8	13.4%	9.7%	8.1%
6	November 11	12.3%	10.0%	9.5%
7	November 12	14.5%	11.6%	9.8%
8	November 13	14.4%	10.9%	9.0%
9	November 14	15.2%	12.2%	9.6%
10	November 15	14.5%	11.6%	10.3%
11	November 18	14.2%	12.1%	10.4%
12	November 19	15.1%	12.3%	10.9%
13	November 20	14.6%	11.7%	10.4%
14	November 21	15.2%	12.1%	10.4%
15	November 22	14.3%	11.5%	9.1%
16	November 25	14.5%	12.7%	11.3%
17	November 26	15.4%	12.8%	10.6%
18	November 27	15.8%	12.1%	9.6%
19	November 28	15.3%	11.6%	10.2%
20	November 29	14.9%	11.4%	9.9%
21	December 2	14.6%	11.8%	10.0%
22	December 3	15.4%	12.4%	10.9%
23	December 4	14.9%	12.0%	10.4%
24	December 5	15.3%	12.0%	10.5%
25	December 6	15.3%	11.2%	9.4%
26	December 9	15.2%	12.4%	11.0%
27	December 10	16.9%	13.0%	11.4%
28	December 11	15.7%	12.0%	10.3%
29	December 12	16.4%	12.9%	11.1%
30	December 13	16.3%	12.5%	11.2%
31	December 16	17.3%	13.2%	12.1%
32	December 17	17.3%	13.4%	11.6%
33	December 18	16.0%	12.4%	10.6%
34	December 19	16.8%	12.4%	10.3%
35	December 20	16.1%	11.9%	10.5%
36	December 23	15.8%	13.4%	11.1%
37	December 24	15.9%	11.9%	10.1%
38	December 25	16.2%	12.9%	11.2%
39	December 26	17.1%	13.4%	11.8%
40	December 30	17.0%	14.2%	13.0%
41	December 31	15.2%	12.3%	10.8%
2020
42	January 1	18.3%	14.5%	12.2%
43	January 2	18.9%	14.1%	12.3%
44	January 3	17.1%	13.8%	12.0%
45	January 6	16.9%	15.0%	13.5%
46	January 7	18.6%	13.2%	11.2%
47	January 8	15.6%	13.8%	12.4%
48	January 9	18.1%	13.2%	12.1%
49	January 10	17.0%	13.5%	11.9%
50	January 13	17.6%	13.8%	12.3%
51	January 14	18.1%	13.1%	11.4%
52	January 15	17.2%	13.0%	11.1%
53	January 16	17.6%	14.3%	12.3%
54	January 17	17.6%	13.4%	11.3%
55	January 20	17.7%	13.8%	11.6%
56	January 21	17.7%	14.2%	12.3%
57	January 22	18.0%	13.6%	11.5%
58	January 23	17.8%	13.6%	11.4%
59	January 27	16.4%	13.4%	11.6%
60	January 28	17.3%	13.6%	11.5%
61	January 29	17.7%	13.5%	11.5%
62	January 30	—	13.8%	11.5%
63	January 31	17.4%	13.5%	11.4%
64	February 3	18.2%	14.9%	13.0%
65	February 4	18.4%	15.3%	13.7%
66	February 5	18.4%	14.8%	12.7%
67	February 6	18.5%	14.6%	12.7%
68	February 7	18.0%	13.7%	11.9%
69	February 10	19.4%	14.7%	12.3%
70	February 11	17.9%	15.7%	13.8%
71	February 12	19.3%	15.1%	12.9%
72	February 13	20.2%	15.3%	13.4%
73	February 14	19.3%	15.5%	13.5%
74	February 17	19.6%	15.8%	13.4%
75	February 18	19.6%	15.7%	13.7%
76	February 19	18.2%	14.9%	12.1%
77	February 20	18.9%	15.8%	14.1%
78	February 21	19.4%	16.3%	14.3%
79	February 24	20.2%	17.0%	15.1%
80	February 25	20.8%	17.4%	15.2%
81	February 26	20.0%	17.0%	15.0%
82	February 27	20.6%	18.0%	15.7%
83	February 28	20.8%	16.6%	14.4%
84	March 2	20.8%	17.0%	14.8%
85	March 3	20.2%	16.9%	15.1%
86	March 4	22.0%	16.8%	14.6%
87	March 5	21.3%	17.7%	15.7%
88	March 6	21.2%	17.7%	16.2%
89	March 9	20.2%	16.3%	14.4%
90	March 10	21.1%	17.2%	15.0%
91	March 11	20.3%	16.6%	14.7%
92	March 12	20.9%	16.9%	14.7%
93	March 13	21.4%	17.2%	15.1%
94	March 16	20.9%	16.9%	15.0%
95	March 17	20.8%	16.8%	14.8%
96	March 18	21.4%	17.2%	15.2%
97	March 19	20.4%	18.2%	16.1%
98	March 20	21.3%	17.7%	15.6%
99	March 23	21.2%	16.5%	14.5%
100	March 24	21.9%	17.9%	16.0%
101	March 25	21.2%	18.0%	15.9%
102	March 26	22.8%	18.8%	17.1%
103	March 27	22.8%	17.6%	14.9%
Average		— (Note: Due to some ratings not recorded, the exact average rating is unknown.)	14.1%	12.2%
