= Kang Kyung-joon =

South Korean actor (born 1983)

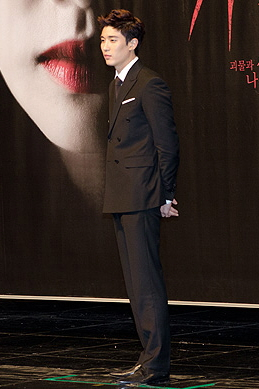
- Kang in February 2013
- Born: February 11, 1983 (age 43); South Korea
- Education: Kaywon School of Art & Design – Department of Design; Konkuk University – Department of Film Arts
- Occupation: Actor
- Years active: 2004–present
- Spouse: Jang Shin-young (m. 2018)
- Children: 2

Korean name
- Hangul: 강경준
- RR: Gang Gyeongjun
- MR: Kang Kyŏngjun

Kang Kyung-joon (Korean: 강경준; born February 11, 1983) is a South Korean actor. He made his acting debut in the fifth season of the sitcom Nonstop in 2004, and was the MC of Music Bank from November 6, 2005 to November 19, 2006. After a supporting role in 2012 manga-adapted romantic comedy To the Beautiful You, Kang played leading roles in melodramas Flower of Revenge, Two Women's Room and A Daughter Just Like You.

== Filmography ==
=== Television series ===
- Welcome to Waikiki (JTBC, 2018)
- Sisters-in-Law (MBC, 2017)
- A Daughter Just Like You (MBC, 2015)
- Two Women's Room (SBS, 2013)
- Flower of Revenge (jTBC, 2013)
- 7th Grade Civil Servant (MBC, 2013) (cameo)
- To the Beautiful You (SBS, 2012)
- Daddy's Sorry (TV Chosun, 2012)
- History of a Salaryman (SBS, 2012) (cameo)
- Cooking Up Romance (KBS2, 2008)
- The Great Catsby (tvN, 2007)
- My Beloved Sister (MBC, 2006–2007)
- The Youth in Bare Foot (MBC, 2005)
- Single Again (SBS, 2005)
- Encounter (MBC, 2005)
- Nonstop 5 (MBC, 2004–2005)

=== Film ===
- My PS Partner (2012)
- Manner of the Battle (2008)

=== Variety show ===
- Music Bank (KBS2, 2005-2006)
- Same Bed, Different Dreams Season 2 (SBS, 2017–present)
- Rural Police 4 (MBC every1, 2018)
- Law of the Jungle (SBS, 2019)
- Handsome Tigers (SBS, 2020)
- The Return of Superman (KBS, 2023)

=== MV ===
- G.E.M. Long Distance (2015)

== Awards ==
- 2004 MBC Entertainment Awards: Best Newcomer in a Sitcom/Comedy (Nonstop 5)
- 2017 MBC Drama Awards: Excellence Award, Actor in a Soap Opera (Sister-in-Law)
