= Working Mom =

2008 South Korean TV series

- Promotional poster
- Genre: Family; Comedy; Drama; Romance
- Written by: Kim Hyun-hee
- Directed by: Oh Jong-rok
- Starring: Yum Jung-ah; Bong Tae-gyu; Cha Ye-ryun; Ryu Tae-joon
- Opening theme: "Kkok" by Kwon Yuri and Choi Sooyoung
- Country of origin: South Korea
- Original language: Korean
- No. of episodes: 16

Production
- Producer: Lee Hyun-jik
- Camera setup: Multiple-camera setup
- Running time: Wednesdays and Thursdays at 21:55 (KST)
- Production companies: JS Pictures; Rainbow Pictures

Original release
- Network: SBS
- Release: July 30 – September 18, 2008

Working Mom (Korean: 워킹맘) is a 2008 South Korean television drama directed by Oh Jong-rok starring Yum Jung-ah, Bong Tae-gyu, Cha Ye-ryun and Ryu Tae-joon. It aired on SBS from July 30 to September 18, 2008 on Wednesdays and Thursdays at 21:55 for 16 episodes.

== Plot ==
Working Mom revolves around the many difficult choices and tradeoffs working women make as they juggle career and family. Choi Ga-young is a successful career woman whose life turns upside down when she accidentally becomes pregnant with the child of her younger co-worker, the troubled but charming Park Jae-sung. Suddenly, she finds herself transformed into a full-time mom dealing with two rowdy little boys.

Determined to return to her glory days, Ga-young decides to start working again, but she has to leave her kids with someone. It would have been her mother, but she died a few years ago and now the only way is to persuade her father to get married again. At first, everything seems to be going smoothly, until Ga-young's plan takes a turn when her new stepmother refuses to take care of her step-grandsons. Thus, Ga-young's quest to win back her job and her husband (who is secretly having an affair with his colleague) begins.

== Cast ==
=== Main characters ===
- Yum Jung-ah as Choi Ga-young
- Bong Tae-gyu as Park Jae-sung
- Cha Ye-ryun as Go Eun-ji
- Ryu Tae-joon as Ha Jung-won

=== Supporting characters ===
- Kim Ja-ok as Kim Bok-sil
- Yoon Joo-sang as Choi Jong-man
- Im Dae-ho as Go Joo-mong
- Hong Su-min as Jung Hyun-joo
- Noh Jung-woong as Park Ji-ho
- Jung Tae-won as Park Ji-min
- Kim Ji-young as Ahn Heung-boon
- Lee Sung-min as Kang Chul-min
- Kwon Se-in as Park In-seong
- Jung Suk-won as Swimming pool lifeguard
- Kim Ga-yeon as Park In-hye
- Jung Hyo-eun as Kang Soo-bin
- Lee Eun-soo as Kang Won-jae
- Ha Jae-young as Jang Kyung-tae
- Lee Seung-hyung as Lee Bang-won

== Original soundtrack ==
No.	Title	Artist	Length
1.	"꼭 (Kkok)"	Kwon Yuri, Choi Sooyoung (Girls' Generation)	03:24
2.	"사랑을 몰라요 (You Don't Know About Love)"	Sunny (Girls' Generation)	03:33
3.	"그대를 꿈꾸다 (Dreaming of You)"	Lee Yoon-jong
4.	"너만 있다면"	Lee Yoon-jong
5.	"Summer Latin"	Various Artists
6.	"허무한 일상"	Various Artists
7.	"기분 좋은 날 (Lovely Day)"	Various Artists
8.	"I'm Working Mom"	Various Artists
9.	"Sometimes"	Various Artists
10.	"말썽 꾸러기 (Troublemaker)"	Various Artists
11.	"천일몽"	Various Artists
12.	"Hunting"	Various Artists
13.	"달콤한 휴식 (Sweet Relief)"	Various Artists
14.	"Sometimes (Guitar Ver.)"	Various Artists
15.	"Working Flamingo"	Various Artists

== Awards and nominations ==
Year	Award	Category	Recipient	Result
2008	2nd Korea Drama Awards	Netizen Popularity Award	Cha Ye-ryun	Nominated
2008	SBS Drama Awards	Excellence Award, Actor in a Drama Special	Bong Tae-gyu	Nominated
2008	SBS Drama Awards	Excellence Award, Actress in a Drama Special	Yum Jung-ah	Nominated
2008	SBS Drama Awards	Best Supporting Actress in a Drama Special	Kim Ja-ok	Won
2008	SBS Drama Awards	PD Award	Bong Tae-gyu	Won
2008	SBS Drama Awards	New Star Award	Cha Ye-ryun	Won
