= Perfume (South Korean TV series) =

2019 South Korean television series

- Promotional poster
- Hangul: 퍼퓸
- RR: Peopyum
- MR: P'ŏp'yum
- Genre: Romantic comedy; Fantasy
- Developed by: KBS Drama Production
- Written by: Choi Hyun-ok
- Directed by: Kim Sang-hwi
- Starring: Shin Sung-rok; Go Won-hee; Cha Ye-ryun; Kim Min-kyu
- Country of origin: South Korea
- Original language: Korean
- No. of episodes: 32 (Note: In order to circumvent Korean laws that prevent commercial breaks in the middle of an episode, what would previously have been aired as single 70 minute episodes are now being repackaged as two 35 minute episodes, with two episodes being shown each night with a commercial break between the two.)

Production
- Producers: Kwon Yong-han; Kim Jung-ah
- Camera setup: Single-camera
- Running time: 35 minutes
- Production companies: Hoga Entertainment; Signal Pictures

Original release
- Network: KBS2
- Release: June 3 – July 23, 2019

Perfume (Korean: 퍼퓸) is a 2019 South Korean television series starring Shin Sung-rok, Ha Jae-sook, Go Won-hee, Cha Ye-ryun and Kim Min-kyu. It aired on KBS2 from June 3 to July 23, 2019.

== Synopsis ==
Min Jae-hee is a middle-aged housewife, who is furious at the world due to her appearance and her husband's affair with a younger woman. She attempts to commit suicide but stops when she receives a magic perfume from a delivery man which makes her young and pretty after using the perfume. She starts working as a model under the name Min Ye-rin and meets Seo Yi-do, a successful fashion designer with multiple allergies and fears.

== Cast ==
=== Main ===
- Shin Sung-rok as Seo Yi-do
  - Choi Seung-hoon as young Yi-do
- Ha Jae-sook as Min Jae-hee
- Go Won-hee as Min Ye-rin
- Cha Ye-ryun as Han Ji-na
- Kim Min-kyu as Yoon Min-seok

=== Supporting ===
- Yeon Min-ji as Song Min-hee
- Kim Jin-kyung as Kim Jin-kyung (daughter)
- Shin Hye-jeong as Son Mi-yu

== Production ==
- Go Joon-hee was first cast as Min Ye-rin, but she withdrew from the series due to emotional stress caused by her being falsely implicated in the Burning Sun scandal.
- The male lead role was offered to Eric Mun, but he declined.

== Viewership ==
Perfume : South Korea viewers per episode (thousands)

Episodes	Episode number															
Episodes	1	2	3	4	5	6	7	8	9	10	11	12	13	14	15	16
1–16	759	1023	905	1183	908	1202	1115	1229	856	1108	850	1216	N/A	1080	1016	1278
17–32	N/A	856	812	990	N/A	904	N/A	920	N/A	831	811	928	826	948	823	1025

Source: Audience measurement performed nationwide by Nielsen Media Research.

Ep.	Original broadcast date	Average audience share	
Ep.	Original broadcast date	AGB Nielsen	
Ep.	Original broadcast date	Nationwide	Seoul
1	June 3, 2019	5.0% (19th)	5.5% (18th)
2	June 3, 2019	6.4% (11th)	7.0% (9th)
3	June 4, 2019	6.0% (11th)	6.1% (10th)
4	June 4, 2019	7.2% (7th)	8.0% (5th)
5	June 10, 2019	5.4% (17th)	5.6% (17th)
6	June 10, 2019	6.6% (11th)	7.3% (8th)
7	June 11, 2019	5.9% (11th)	6.4% (9th)
8	June 11, 2019	6.8% (6th)	7.6% (6th)
9	June 17, 2019	4.9% (17th)	5.3% (19th)
10	June 17, 2019	6.4% (11th)	7.0% (8th)
11	June 18, 2019	4.8% (NR)	—N/a
12	June 18, 2019	6.7% (9th)	6.9% (12th)
13	June 24, 2019	4.3% (NR)	—N/a
14	June 24, 2019	6.1% (15th)	6.3% (12th)
15	June 25, 2019	5.3% (19th)	5.6% (16th)
16	June 25, 2019	6.9% (9th)	7.2% (8th)
17	July 1, 2019	4.0% (NR)	—N/a
18	July 1, 2019	5.0% (18th)	5.3% (16th)
19	July 2, 2019	4.4% (NR)	—N/a
20	July 2, 2019	5.2% (17th)	5.3% (16th)
21	July 8, 2019	4.2% (NR)	—N/a
22	July 8, 2019	4.7% (NR)	—N/a
23	July 9, 2019	4.3% (NR)	—N/a
24	July 9, 2019	4.9% (NR)	—N/a
25	July 15, 2019	3.7% (NR)	—N/a
26	July 15, 2019	4.7% (20th)	—N/a
27	July 16, 2019	4.7% (NR)	4.9% (20th)
28	July 16, 2019	5.3% (16th)	5.8% (14th)
29	July 22, 2019	4.4% (NR)	—N/a
30	July 22, 2019	5.2% (18th)	—N/a
31	July 23, 2019	4.6% (NR)	4.7% (19th)
32	July 23, 2019	5.9% (15th)	6.3% (13th)
Average		5.3%	— (Note: Due to some ratings not recorded, the exact average rating is unknown.)

== Awards and nominations ==
Year	Award	Category	Recipient	Result
2019	12th Korea Drama Awards	Excellence Award, Actor	Shin Sung-rok	Nominated
2019	KBS Drama Awards	Excellence Award, Actor in a Miniseries	Shin Sung-rok	Nominated
2019	KBS Drama Awards	Excellence Award, Actress in a Miniseries	Ko Won-hee	Nominated
2019	KBS Drama Awards	Best Supporting Actress	Ha Jae-sook	Won
2019	KBS Drama Awards	Netizen Award, Actor	Shin Sung-rok	Nominated
2019	KBS Drama Awards	Netizen Award, Actress	Ko Won-hee	Nominated
2019	KBS Drama Awards	Best Couple Award	Shin Sung-rok and Ko Won-hee	Nominated
