= Kim Heung-soo (actor) =

South Korean actor

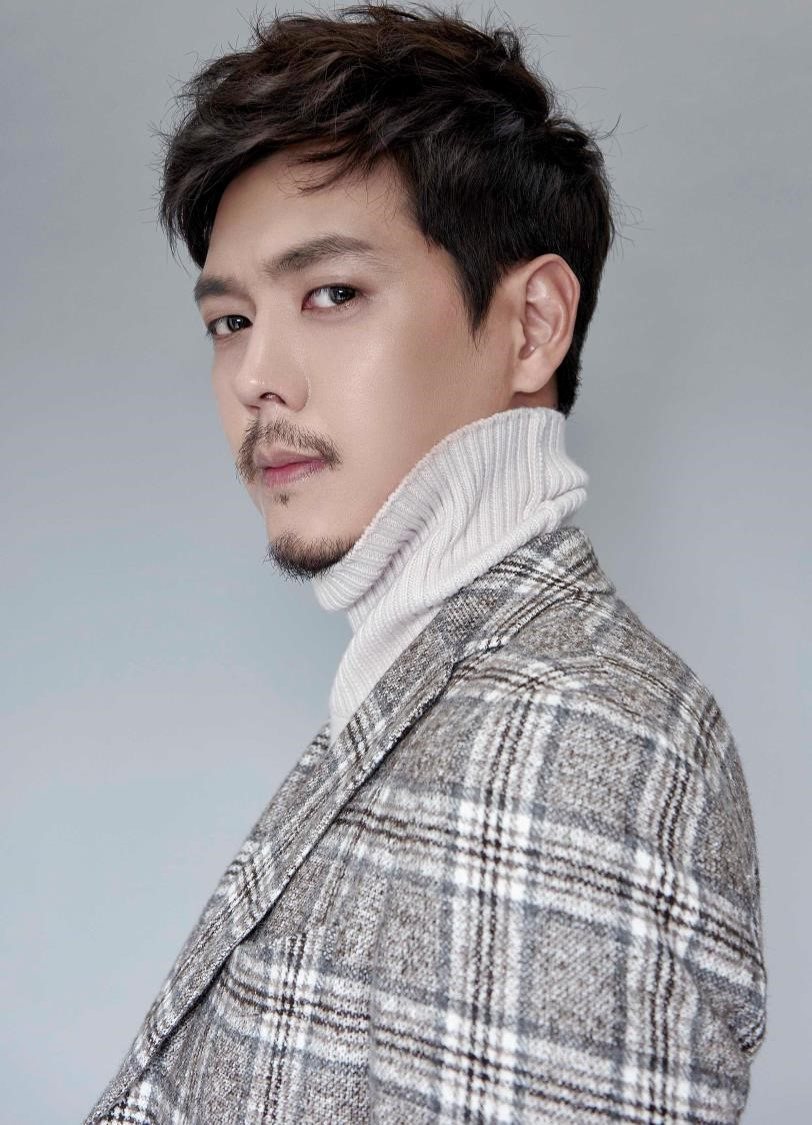
- Kim in 2019
- Born: May 19, 1983 (age 43); Seoul, South Korea
- Occupation: Actor
- Years active: 1999–present
- Agent: Acom My ENT

Korean name
- Hangul: 김흥수
- Hanja: 金興銖
- RR: Gim Heungsu
- MR: Kim Hŭngsu

Kim Heung-soo (born May 19, 1983) is a South Korean actor. He is best known for his roles in television series, such as Love & Secret (2014–2015) and Gracious Revenge (2019–2020).

== Filmography ==
=== Film ===
Year	Title	Role	Notes
2002	Over the Rainbow	Kyung-soo	
2003	Romantic Assassin	San	
2007	Hellcats	Na Won-suk	
2008	Like Father, Like Son	Gun-sung	
2010	Lady Daddy	Young-kwang	Cameo
2010	A Good Night Sleep for the Bad	Yoon-sung	
2010	Loveholic	Dong-joo	

=== Television ===
Year	Title	Network	Role	Notes
1999–2000	School 2	KBS2	Park Heung-soo	
2000	Gibbs Family	MBC	Joon-hyuk	
2000	My Funky Family	MBC		
2000	RNA	KBS2	Go Moo-sung	
2002	Drama City – Beautiful Youth	KBS2	Han Kang-pyo	
2002–2003	Honest Living	SBS	Kim Heung-soo	
2004	More Beautiful Than a Flower	KBS2	Kim Jae-soo	
2004–2005	Emperor of the Sea	KBS2	Jung Nyun	
2005	Princess Lulu	SBS	Kim Chan-ho	
2007	Drama City – Aperture	KBS2	Goo Young-goo	
2007–2008	Kimcheed Radish Cubes	MBC	Jung Dong-sik	
2008	Life Special Investigation Team	MBC	Gong Chul-soo	
2009	Invincible Lee Pyung Kang	KBS2	Je Young-ryu	
2010–2011	The President	KBS2	Ki Soo-chan	
2011	Drama Special Series – Perfect Spy	KBS2	Kim Hyuk-bum	
2014	KBS Drama Special – Youth	KBS2	Suk-hyun	
2014	Quiz of God 4	OCN	Lee Jong-suk	Guest (episode 5)
2014	Diary of a Night Watchman	MBC	Prince Ki-san	
2014–2015	Love & Secret	KBS2	Chun Sung-woon	
2018	Risky Romance	MBC	Choi Han-sung	Guest
2019–2020	Gracious Revenge	KBS2	Goo Hae-joon	

=== Music video appearances ===
Year	Song title	Artist
2000	"See You"	Go Ho-kyung
2005	"Three Letters"	M To M
2006	"Tears of the Sun"	KCM
2006	"To Eun-young, for the Last Time"	KCM
2010	"I've Done Only Good Things for You"	Bebe Mignon
2010	"What Are You Doing?"	4Men feat. Mi
2014	"Pung Pung"	Ali

== Awards and nominations ==
Year	Award	Category	Nominated work	Result
2004	18th KBS Drama Awards	Best Supporting Actor	More Beautiful Than a Flower	Won
2007	21st KBS Drama Awards	Excellence Award, Actor in a One-Act/Special/Short Drama	Drama City – Aperture	Nominated
2008	44th Baeksang Arts Awards	Best New Actor (Film)	Hellcats	Nominated
2014	28th KBS Drama Awards	Excellence Award, Actor in a Daily Drama	Love & Secret	Nominated
2019	33rd KBS Drama Awards	Excellence Award, Actor in a Daily Drama	Gracious Revenge	Nominated
