= Son Seung-won =

South Korean actor

- Born: June 29, 1990 (age 36); South Korea
- Education: Seoul Institute of the Arts
- Occupation: Actor
- Years active: 2009–2018
- Agent: Blossom

Korean name
- Hangul: 손승원
- Hanja: 孫承源
- RR: Son Seungwon
- MR: Son Sŭngwŏn

Son Seung-won (born June 29, 1990) is a South Korean actor. He is most active in musical theatre, and was the youngest Korean actor cast in the leading role in the Korean staging of Hedwig and the Angry Inch in 2013.

He is known for his role in the television series Hello, My Twenties! and Welcome to Waikiki.

== DUI and imprisonment ==
In April 2019, Son was sentenced to one year and six months in prison, forfeiting his military service. His acting career has come to an end after this incident. Son was released from prison in May 2020.

== Filmography ==
=== Television series ===
Year	Title	Role	Ref.
2014	KBS Drama Special: "We All Cry Differently"	Ryu Ji-han	
2014–15	Love & Secret	Han Jin-woo	
2014–15	Healer	Kim Moon-sik (young)	
2015	Hello Monster	Choi Eun-bok	
2016	My Lawyer, Mr. Jo	Byun Seung-mo	
2016-17	Person Who Gives Happiness	Lee Gun-woo	
2016-17	Hello, My Twenties!	Im Sung-min	
2018	Welcome to Waikiki	Bong Doo-shik	

=== Film ===
Year	Title	Role	Notes
2011	Glove	Park Choong-nam	

== Musical theatre ==
Year	Title	Role
2009	Spring Awakening	
2010	A Person Who Dreams	
2011	Welcome Mom	Him Chan
2011-2012	Thrill Me	Nathan Leopold
2012-2013	The Birth of Playing Hard to Get	Seo Dong
2013	Trace U	Koo Bon-ha
2013-2014	Hedwig and the Angry Inch	Hedwig
2013	The Veiled Empress of 1895	Hwi
2013-2014	Le Passe Muraille	News Vendor
2016	Bare the musical	Peter
2016	The Days	Kang Moo-young
2017-2018	Fan Letter	Jung Se-hoon
2018	R&J	Student 1
2018-2019	Rimbaud	Rimbaud
