= The Stars Are Shining =

2015–2016 South Korean television series

- Promotional poster
- Also known as: Stardust
- Hangul: 별이 되어 빛나리
- RR: Byeori doeeo binnari
- MR: Pyŏri toeŏ pinnari
- Genre: Period drama; Romance; Family
- Written by: Yoo Eun-ha; Jo So-young
- Directed by: Kyun Kwe-hong
- Starring: Go Won-hee; Lee Ha-yool; Seo Yoon-na; Cha Do-jin
- Country of origin: South Korea
- Original language: Korean
- No. of episodes: 128

Production
- Executive producer: Lee Jin-seo
- Producer: Yoo Hyun-ki
- Running time: 40 min
- Production company: KBS Drama Production

Original release
- Network: KBS2
- Release: August 31, 2015 – February 26, 2016

The Stars Are Shining (Korean: 별이 되어 빛나리) is a 2015 South Korea morning soap opera starring Go Won-hee, Lee Ha-yool, Seo Yoon-na, and Cha Do-jin. It aired on KBS2 from August 31, 2015, to February 26, 2016, on Mondays to Fridays at 09:00 (KST) to 09:45 (KST).

It is the 39th TV Novel series (8th in 2010s) of KBS.

== Summary ==
In 1960's, the family of an optimistic girl Jo Bong-hee, fell into difficulties after her father's death. Then, she decided to rekindle her hope and overcomes different obstacles to become the best fashion designer in Korea.

== Cast ==
=== Main ===
- Go Won-hee as Jo Bong-hee
- Lee Ha-yool as Yoon Jong-hyun
- Seo Yoon-na as Seo Mo-ran
- Cha Do-jin as Hong Sung-guk

=== Supporting ===
==== People around Bong-hee ====
- Baek Soo-lyeon as Jae Gun-mo (Cameo)
- Song Young-goo as Jo Jae-gun (Cameo)
- Kim Ye-ryeong as Lee Jung-rae
- Kim Ji-woo as Jo Bong-hyun
- Choi Soo-im as Jo Bong-seon

==== People around Jong-hyun ====
- Yoon Joo-sang as Yoon Gil-jae
- Lee Yeon-kyung as Han Bok-joo

==== People around Mo-ran ====
- Im Ho as Seo Dong-pil
- Jo Eun-sook as Oh Ae-suk

==== People around Sung-guk ====
- Kim Hee-won as Choi Kyung-ja
- Lee Du-seop as Jung Man-buk
- Park Seon-woo as Jung Chun-sik
- Yoon Ji-wook as Jung Chul-buk
