= Flower of Revenge =

South Korean television series

- Promotional poster
- Also known as: Thorn Flower; A Flower with Thorns; Thorny Flower
- Hangul: 가시꽃
- RR: Gasikkot
- MR: Kasikkot
- Genre: Melodrama Revenge Family
- Written by: Lee Hong-ku
- Directed by: Kim Do-hyung
- Starring: Jang Shin-young; Kang Kyung-joon; Seo Do-young; Sa Hee; Jung Ji-yoon; Lee Won-suk
- Composer: Kim Hyun-bo
- Country of origin: South Korea
- Original language: Korean
- No. of episodes: 120

Production
- Executive producer: Jo Joon-hyung
- Production location: Korea
- Cinematography: Ahn Jae-hyun; Lee Gang-min
- Editor: Park Seon-young
- Running time: 40 minutes
- Production company: JTBC (Drama House)

Original release
- Network: jTBC
- Release: February 4 – August 1, 2013

Flower of Revenge (Korean: 가시꽃; lit. 'Spine Flower') is a 2013 South Korean television series starring Jang Shin-young, Kang Kyung-joon, Seo Do-young, Sa Hee, Jung Ji-yoon, and Lee Won-suk. It was the very first daily drama broadcast by cable channel jTBC, and it aired from February 4 to August 1, 2013 on Mondays to Fridays at 20:15 (KST) for 120 episodes.

== Synopsis ==
Jeon Se-mi (Jang Shin-young) was once a pure and innocent girl. But that all changes when she is betrayed by her lover, loses her family, and raped. Her traumatic past pushes her on a path of vengeance against the people who wronged her and made her life into shambles.

== Cast ==
=== Main ===
- Jang Shin-young as Jeon Se-mi / Jennifer Dyer Mason / Choi Seo-yeon
- Kang Kyung-joon as Kang Hyuk-min
- Seo Do-young as Park Nam-joon
- Sa Hee as Kang Ji-min
- Jung Ji-yoon as Chun Soo-ji
- Lee Won-suk as Baek Seo-won

=== Supporting ===
- Kim Byung-choon as Kang Joo-chul

Hyuk-min's father.

- Cha Hwa-yeon as Min Hwa-young

Hyuk-min's mother.

- Kim Kwon as Kang Sung-min

Hyuk-min's younger brother.

- Choi Woo-suk as Yoo Je-joon

Se-mi's ex, Ji-min's husband.

- Kim Ji-young as Nam-joon's grandmother.
- Lee Deok-hee as Lee Jin-sook

Nam-joon's mother.

- Yoo Ah-mi as Park Sun-young

Nam-joon's aunt.

- Kim Kyung-sook as Mrs. Hyun

Soo-ji's mother.

- Ahn Suk-hwan as Baek Doo-jin

Seo-won's father.

- Park Jin-joo as Park Nam-hee

Nam-joon's young sister.

- Kim Kwon as Kang Sung-min

Hyun-min's young brother.

- Kang Ye-seo as Yoo Ye-ji

Ji-min's daughter.

- Lee Chul-min as Kim Baek-choon
- Kim Young-bae as Detective Seo

=== Special appearances ===
- Kang Shin-il as Mr. Jeon

Se-mi's father.

- Kim Chung as Mrs. Hong

Se-mi's mother.
