= Princess Lulu =

- Written by: Kwon So-yeon; Lee Hye-sun
- Directed by: Son Jung-hyun; Park Hyung-ki
- Starring: Kim Jung-eun; Jung Joon-ho
- Country of origin: South Korea
- Original language: Korean
- No. of episodes: 20

Production
- Executive producer: Goo Bon-geun
- Producer: Kim Yang
- Production companies: POIBOS Co. Ltd.; Kim Jong-hak Production

Original release
- Network: Seoul Broadcasting System
- Release: July 27 – September 29, 2005

Princess Lulu (Korean: 루루 공주; RR: Ruru gongju) is a 2005 South Korean television series starring Kim Jung-eun, Jung Joon-ho and Kim Heung-soo. It aired on SBS from July 27 to September 29, 2005, on Wednesdays and Thursdays at 21:55 for 20 episodes.

== Plot ==
Go Hee-soo is the granddaughter of the president of South Korea's biggest conglomerate KS Group. Raised by her grandfather, she is charming and elegant. However, she regrets that she lost her mother, who died in a plane accident with Kim Chan-ho's parents. One day, she meets Kang Woo-jin, who has just come back from the United Kingdom. She is attracted to his carefree personality as he shows her a world she never knew. But Chan-ho, a very good friend of Kang Woo-jin's, grew up with Hee-soo and never regarded her as his older sister. Their love triangle is just the beginning.

== Cast ==
Main characters

- Kim Jung-eun as Go Hee-soo
- Jung Joon-ho as Kang Woo-jin
- Kim Heung-soo as Kim Chan-ho

Supporting characters

- Lee Seung-woo as Go Sun
- Lee Soon-jae as President Go Duk-soo
- Geum Bo-ra as Mrs. Park
- Yoon So-jung as Jang Myung-sook
- Ha Seok-jin as Suk-jin
- Heo Jung-min as Jung-min
- Lee Han-wi as Department head Jo
- Lee Eui-jung as Lee Jae-kyung
- Jung So-young as Kim Yoo-mi
- Park Chul-min as Moon Ki-sa
- Kim Sun-hwa as Wang Jip-sa
- Lee Hyo-jung as President Park Jong-chul
- Kim Ki-doo

== Reception ==
The series was criticized for excessive product placement and its unrealistic storylines, such that lead actress Kim Jung-eun herself nearly walked off the set. On September 10, 2005, she posted on her Internet fan cafe an entry titled "I am sorry." In the entry, she said she no longer had any confidence in acting in a story that was unconvincing and had been forcibly extended. She also said, "Due to the flow of the drama, which is becoming increasingly difficult to understand, I cannot force the viewers to accept my insincerity and I am no longer confident in portraying a character that changes at every episode." She also criticized the current drama production system. "I had to shoot the episode for Thursday that very afternoon, and it was only Saturday that I could get the script for next Wednesday's episode." Viewers who read the entry posted varying reactions on the Internet board of the drama; while some of them agreed with her assessment of the problems of the TV production system, others criticized her for being unprofessional. The production staff eventually persuaded Kim to continue filming, and she went back to work the next day, September 11.

== International broadcast ==
- In the Philippines aired on ABS-CBN from February 13 to April 12, 2006 replacing Vietnam Rose.
- In Vietnam aired on VTV3 from January 24, 2007.
- In Thailand aired on Channel 3 from June 7 to August 30, 2008.
