= Cha Ye-ryun =

South Korean actress (born 1985)

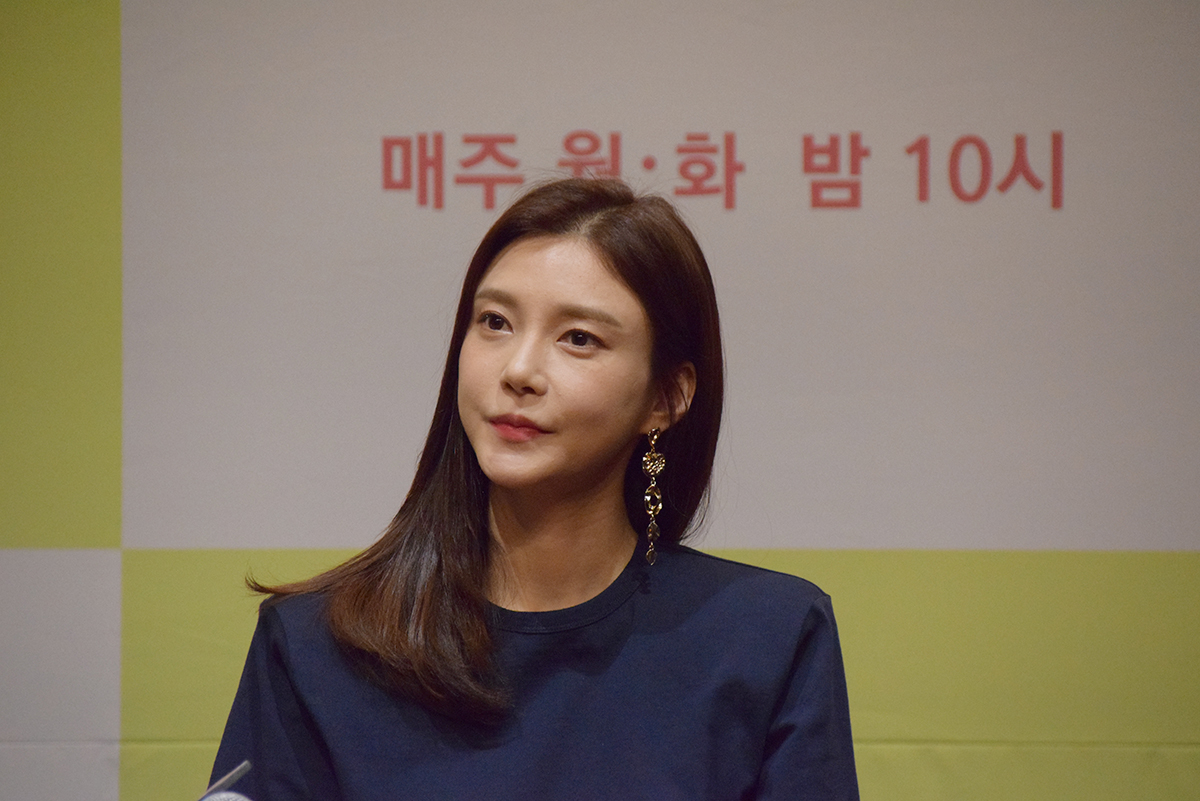
- Cha in 2019
- Born: Park Hyun-ho; July 16, 1985 (age 41); Seoul, South Korea
- Occupation: Actress
- Years active: 2005–present
- Agent: HB Entertainment
- Spouse: Joo Sang-wook (m. 2017)
- Children: 1

Korean name
- Hangul: 박현호
- RR: Bak Hyeonho
- MR: Pak Hyŏnho

Stage name
- Hangul: 차예련
- RR: Cha Yeryeon
- MR: Ch'a Yeryŏn

Cha Ye-ryun (Korean: 차예련; born July 16, 1985), born Park Hyun-ho (박현호), is a South Korean actress. A graduate of Sangmyung High School, she began acting in 2005 at the age of 20, when she had a supporting role in the horror film Voice. In 2007, she made her official television debut as one of the main cast members in the melodrama Cruel Love. Cha played her first leading role in the 2014 romantic-comedy film The Actress Is Too Much.

== Personal life ==
Cha and actor Joo Sang-wook began dating in March 2016, after meeting on the set of 2015 TV series Glamorous Temptation. The couple later married on May 25, 2017, at the Grand Walkerhill Hotel in Seoul. Their first child was born on July 31, 2018.

== Filmography ==
=== Film ===
Year	Title	Role	Notes	Ref.
2005	Voice	Cho-ah		
2006	A Bloody Aria	In-jung		
2007	Muoi: The Legend of a Portrait	Seo-yeon		
2008	Do Re Mi Fa So La Ti Do	Yoon Jung-won		
2009	Where Are You Going?	Eun-young	Cameo	
2011	Little Black Dress	Choi Soo-jin		
2011	Sector 7	Park Hyun-jung		
2014	The Plan Man	Lee Ji-won		
2014	Actress is Too Much	Na-bi		
2014	The Tenor – Lirico Spinto	Lee Yoon-hee		
2015	The Chosen: Forbidden Cave	Joo Hye-in		
2015	Twin Spirit			

=== Television series ===
Year	Title	Role	Notes	Ref.
2007	Cruel Love	Joanne / Park Shin-young		
2008	Working Mom	Ko Eun-ji		
2008	Star's Lover	Choi Eun-young		
2009	Style	Herself	Cameo	
2009	Invincible Lee Pyung-Kang	Kwan Ja-rak		
2010	Dr. Champ	Kang Hee-young		
2011	Royal Family	Jo Hyun-jin		
2013	Golden Rainbow	Kim Chun-won / Yoon Ha-bin		
2014	My Lovely Girl	Shin Hae-yoon		
2015	Glamorous Temptation	Kang Il-joo		
2019	Perfume	Han Ji-na		
2019–2020	Gracious Revenge	Jennis Han Yoo-jin / Hong Yoo-ra		
2022	Gold Mask	Yoo Su-yeon		
2023	Battle for Happiness	Kim Na-young		

=== Web series ===
Year	Title	Role	Ref.
2021	Midnight Thriller	Yeon-hee	

=== Television shows ===
Year	Title	Role	Ref.
2021	I Need Women	Main Cast	

=== Music video appearances ===
Year	Song title	Artist	Ref.
2003	"Yet Love"	Jo Jang-hyuk	
2006	"Scent of a Woman"	SeeYa	
2006	"Because I Love You"	SeeYa	
2010	"I'm Sorry"	M To M	
2021	"Again"	Monni	

== Discography ==
=== Soundtrack appearances ===
List of soundtrack appearances, showing year released, and name of the album
Title	Year	Album
"My Black Mini Dress" (with Yoon Eun-hye, Park Han-byul, and Yoo In-na)	2011	Little Black Dress OST

== Awards and nominations ==
Name of the award ceremony, year presented, category, nominee of the award, and the result of the nomination
Award ceremony	Year	Category	Nominee / Work	Result	Ref.
Asia Model Awards	2011	Model Star Award	Cha Ye-ryun	Won	
Asia Model Festival Awards	2012	BBF Popular Star	Cha Ye-ryun	Won	
Herald Donga Lifestyle Awards	2014	Best Dressed	Cha Ye-ryun	Won	
KBS Drama Awards	2019	Excellence Award, Actress in a Daily Drama	Gracious Revenge	Won	
KBS Drama Awards	2022	Excellence Award, Actress in a Daily Drama	Gold Mask	Won	
KBS Entertainment Awards	2022	Best Entertainer Award	Stars' Top Recipe at Fun-Staurant	Won	
KBS Entertainment Awards	2022	Rookie Award in Show and Variety Category	Stars' Top Recipe at Fun-Staurant	Nominated	
Korea Drama Awards	2008	Netizen Popularity Award	Working Mom	Nominated	
MBC Drama Awards	2011	Best New Actress in a Miniseries	Royal Family	Nominated	
SBS Drama Awards	2008	New Star Award	Working Mom	Won	
SBS Drama Awards	2014	Excellence Award, Actress in a Miniseries	My Lovely Girl	Nominated	
