= I Am Sam (TV series) =

2007 South Korean television series

- Promotional poster
- Also known as: I'm Sam; I Am Your Teacher
- Genre: Romance, Comedy
- Based on: Kyōkasho ni Nai! by Kazuto Okada
- Written by: Lee Jin-mae
- Directed by: Kim Jung-gyu
- Starring: Yang Dong-geun; Park Min-young; Park Jun-gyu; Son Tae-young; Choi Seung-hyun
- Country of origin: South Korea
- No. of episodes: 16

Production
- Producer: Lee Jae-sang
- Running time: 60 minutes
- Production company: Pan Entertainment

Original release
- Network: KBS2
- Release: August 6 – October 2, 2007

I Am Sam (Korean: 아이엠샘) is a 2007 South Korean television series starring Yang Dong-geun, Park Min-young, Park Jun-gyu, Son Tae-young, and Choi Seung-hyun in his acting debut. It aired on KBS2 from August 6 to October 2, 2007, on Mondays and Tuesdays at 21:55 (KST) for 16 episodes. Based on the Japanese manga series Kyōkasho ni Nai! (English: "Not in a Textbook!", or "Very Private Lesson"), Yang plays a geeky, straight-arrow, under-qualified high school teacher who becomes a live-in tutor for the troublemaking daughter of a notorious gangster, in exchange for one billion won.

The title is a word play since sam in Korean roughly translates to "teacher" in slang, thus the international title, I Am Your Teacher.

== Synopsis ==
Yoo Jae-gon (Park Jun-gyu), head of an infamous gangster organization, becomes troubled by the future prospects of his only daughter, Eun-byul (Park Min-young), who refuses to study. Then coincidence or fate brings together Eun-byul and goofy-looking high school teacher Jang Yi-san (Yang Dong-geun) in a somewhat sticky situation. After finding out that Yi-san can actually inspire his troublesome daughter to focus on her studies, Jae-gon offers a deal to Yi-san: become his daughter's private tutor in exchange for one million won. The catch is Yi-san has to move in with her. And the money? It's given as security for his own life.

== Cast ==
=== Main ===
- Yang Dong-geun as Jang Yi-san
- Park Min-young as Yoo Eun-byul
- Son Tae-young as Shin So-yi
- Park Jun-gyu as Yoo Jae-gon (Eun-byul's father)
- Choi Seung-hyun as Chae Moo-shin
- Park Chae-kyung as Min Sa-kang (Eun-byul's best friend)

=== Supporting ===
- Park Chae-kyung as Min Sa-kang (Eun-byul's friend)
- Park Jae-jung as Kim Woo-jin (Mr. Yoo's right-hand man)
- Jo Hyang-ki as Hong Dae-ri (Mr. Yoo's assistant)
- Kwak Ji-min as Da-bin
- Dan Ji as Ye-bin
- Ban So-young as Hyo-bin
- Lee Min-ho as Heo Mo-se (Principal's son)
- Choi Jae-hwan as Han Tae-sung (Moo-shin's friend)
- Park Chul-ho as Kim In-seol
- Kim Yoo-bin as Kim Hee-chul
- Joo Jong-hyuk as Ji Seon-hoo
- Kim Hong-shik as Park Nam-kyu
- Yoo Tae-woong as Go Dong-sool
- Choi Joo-bong as Heo Deok-bae (Principal)
- Park Sang-hyun as Park Han-suk
- Shin Pyo as Kang Ha

== Reception ==
I Am Sam received average viewership ratings of around 6.5%.

== Awards ==
- 2007 KBS Drama Awards: Best New Actress - Park Min-young

== Source material ==
- Title: Not in the Textbook! (also known as Very Private Lesson) (教科書にないッ!, Kyōkasho ni Nai!) (교과서엔 없어; Gyogwaseoen eopseo)
- Original story: Kazuto Okada (岡田和人)
- Genre: Comedy, Romance
- Age rating: 10+
Manga storyline

Oraku is a lucky man... He has a comfortable job teaching at a local high school. He has Satsuki, a fellow teacher whom he hopes to marry someday.

He has Aya, a beautiful student who has fallen in love with him. He has Aya's father, a wealthy man who wants so much for his little girl to be happy that he has sent her to live with Oraku.

Oraku is a very lucky man. Of course Aya loves nothing more than to come on to Oraku by lounging around his apartment half naked. Unfortunately for Oraku, Aya's father happens to be wealthy because he is a major crime boss, and he will have Oraku slowly murdered if Aya doesn't remain absolutely pure.

Now Oraku must not only restrain himself, but also protect Aya from the hordes of men and women at school...

And of course, if Satsuki or any of the other teachers find out that Oraku is living with one of his students, he will be permanently dismissed from the teaching profession.

== See also ==
- List of Korean television shows
- Contemporary culture of South Korea
- Big Bang (South Korean band)
