= Glory Jane =

2011 South Korean television drama series

- Promotional poster
- Also known as: Man of Honor; Young-kwang's Jae-in; The Glory of Jae-in; Young Love Jane
- Hangul: 영광의 재인
- Hanja: 榮光의 재인
- RR: Yeonggwangui Jaein
- MR: Yŏnggwangŭi Chaein
- Genre: Romance; Melodrama; Action; Sports
- Written by: Kang Eun-kyung
- Directed by: Lee Jung-sub
- Starring: Chun Jung-myung; Park Min-young; Lee Jang-woo
- Opening theme: "Glory Jane (Title)"
- Country of origin: South Korea
- Original language: Korean
- No. of episodes: 24

Production
- Production location: Korea
- Running time: 60 minutes Wednesdays and Thursdays at 21:55 (KST)
- Production company: Kim Jong-hak Production

Original release
- Network: Korean Broadcasting System
- Release: October 12 – December 29, 2011

Glory Jane (Korean: 영광의 재인; lit. 'Young-kwang's Jae-in' or Man of Honor (Note: In Korean, yeonggwang means "honor" and jaein means "man." The title is also a pun on the protagonists' names.)) is a 2011 South Korean television drama series, starring Chun Jung-myung, Park Min-young, and Lee Jang-woo. The series follows the romantic and professional trials of an aspiring nurse and two baseball players as they strive for their love and dreams. It aired on KBS2 from October 12 to December 29, 2011 on Wednesdays and Thursdays at 21:55 for 24 episodes.

== Synopsis ==
Yoon Jae-in (Park Min-young) is a hardworking nurse who does not remember her past. In fact she is the daughter of Yoon Il-goo (Ahn Nae-sang) who was the president of a trading company. Yoon Il-goo was killed in a car accident orchestrated by his friend Seo Jae-myung (Son Chang-min), to make sure that Jae-myung takes over control of the company. When Jae-in's mother Eun-joo (Jang Young-nam) received news of her husband's accident she took Jae-in and drove to the hospital. However, due to heavy rain, they got into a car accident caused by Jae-myung's goons, which separated the mother and daughter. Jae-myung ordered Kim In-bae (Lee Ki-yeol) who works as his chauffeur to send Jae-in, who had lost all of her memories at the time, to an orphanage, where In-bae told her to never forget her name. 17 years later, In-bae's son, Young-kwang (Chun Jung-myung), is a baseball player and one of the league's most promising sluggers, but he's since been demoted to the minors. He had a fallout with his rival, Jae-myung's son, Seo In-woo (Lee Jang-woo), who not only comes from a rich family but is currently the league's top star. While injured, Young-kwang meets Jae-in, and she saves him with a blood transfusion. Under Jae-myung's orders, In-bae is chased and killed in an accident orchestrated by his goons, to prevent In-bae from revealing Jae-myung's dark secrets. Young-kwang decides to quit being a baseball player and owning his father's noodle shop. Jae-in also quits her job as a nurse to find a job with Young-kwang. In-woo finds himself disowned by his father, and the three of them apply for jobs at Jae-myung's office. Young-kwang and In-woo continue to vie for Jae-in's affections in a bitter rivalry that goes far back to their childhoods. Seo In-chul (Park Sung-woong) also enters their lives; his lover is Kim Kyung-joo (Kim Yun-joo), who happens to be Young-kwang's runaway sister. Then Eun-joo awakens from her coma.

== Cast ==
=== Main characters ===
- Chun Jung-myung as Kim Young-kwang
  - Ahn Do-gyu as young Young-kwang
- Park Min-young as Yoon Jae-in
  - Ahn Eun-jung as young Jae-in
- Lee Jang-woo as Seo In-woo
  - Kim Ji-hoon as young In-woo
- Lee Jin as Cha Hong-joo

=== Supporting characters ===
- Son Chang-min as Seo Jae-myung
- Park Sung-woong as Seo In-chul
- Choi Myung-gil as Park Gun-ja
- Lee Ki-young as Kim In-bae
- Kim Yun-joo as Kim Kyung-joo
- Nam Bo-ra as Kim Jin-joo
- Jung Hye-sun as Oh Soon-nyeo
- Kim Sun-kyung as Im Jung-ok
- Lee Moon-sik as Heo Young-do
- Kim Sung-oh as Joo Dae-sung
- Choi Seung-kyung as Go Kil-dong
- Ahn Nae-sang as Yoon Il-goo
- Jang Young-nam as Yeo Eun-joo
- Kim Seung-wook as Coach Choi
- Choi Ran as Director of nursing service
- Roh Kyung-joo as Oh Jung-hae

== Ratings ==
Date	Episode	Nationwide	Seoul
2011-10-12	1	7.3%	8.2%
2011-10-13	2	9.1% (18th)	9.4% (19th)
2011-10-19	3	12.3% (6th)	13.6% (6th)
2011-10-20	4	12.3% (8th)	14.7% (6th)
2011-10-26	5	12.0% (8th)	13.1% (7th)
2011-10-27	6	12.3% (9th)	13.7% (6th)
2011-11-02	7	12.2% (8th)	14.0% (6th)
2011-11-03	8	14.0% (6th)	16.1% (5th)
2011-11-09	9	12.9% (10th)	12.3% (9th)
2011-11-10	10	12.6% (8th)	12.3% (9th)
2011-11-16	11	13.1% (7th)	14.2% (6th)
2011-11-17	12	13.2% (7th)	14.3% (5th)
2011-11-23	13	11.9% (9th)	14.6% (4th)
2011-11-24	14	12.9% (7th)	14.7% (4th)
2011-11-30	15	12.6% (8th)	15.2% (4th)
2011-12-01	16	12.4% (7th)	14.0% (4th)
2011-12-07	17	13.9% (5th)	16.7% (4th)
2011-12-08	18	14.5% (5th)	15.9% (5th)
2011-12-14	19	15.4% (4th)	17.1% (4th)
2011-12-15	20	16.2% (4th)	18.8% (3rd)
2011-12-21	21	14.3% (4th)	16.6% (4th)
2011-12-22	22	15.2% (5th)	17.3% (4th)
2011-12-28	23	21.8% (1st)	24.9% (1st)
2011-12-28	24	20.2% (3rd)	22.1% (2nd)
average		13.5%	15.2%

Source: TNS Media Korea

== Awards and nominations ==
Year	Award	Category	Recipient	Result
2011	19th Korean Culture and Entertainment Awards	Best New Actress in a Drama	Nam Bo-ra	Won
2011	KBS Drama Awards	Top Excellence Award, Actor	Chun Jung-myung	Nominated
2011	KBS Drama Awards	Top Excellence Award, Actress	Park Min-young	Nominated
2011	KBS Drama Awards	Excellence Award, Actor in a Mid-length Drama	Chun Jung-myung	Won
2011	KBS Drama Awards	Excellence Award, Actress in a Mid-length Drama	Park Min-young	Won
2011	KBS Drama Awards	Best Supporting Actor	Son Chang-min	Nominated
2011	KBS Drama Awards	Best New Actor	Lee Jang-woo	Won
2011	KBS Drama Awards	Best Young Actor	Ahn Do-gyu	Nominated
2012	7th Seoul International Drama Awards	Outstanding Korean Drama	Glory Jane	Nominated
