= Who Are You? (2013 TV series) =

2013 South Korean television series

- Promotional poster
- Genre: Police procedural Mystery; Horror; Romance
- Created by: Jang Hang-jun
- Written by: Moon Ji-young; Ban Ki-ri
- Directed by: Jo Hyun-tak
- Starring: So Yi-hyun; Ok Taec-yeon; Kim Jae-wook
- Composer: Kim Hyeon-jong
- Country of origin: South Korea
- Original language: Korean
- No. of episodes: 16

Production
- Executive producer: Lee Chan-ho
- Producer: Lee Min-jin
- Production location: Korea
- Cinematography: Kim Hong-jae; Choi Jae-rak
- Editor: Nam In-joo
- Running time: 60 minutes
- Production company: A Story

Original release
- Network: tvN
- Release: 29 July – 17 September 2013

Who Are You? (Korean: 후아유) is a 2013 South Korean television series starring So Yi-hyun, Ok Taec-yeon, and Kim Jae-wook. It aired on tvN from July 29 to September 17, 2013 on Mondays and Tuesdays at 23:00 (and simultaneously broadcast on OnStyle) for 16 episodes.

== Synopsis ==
Detective Yang Shi-ohn (So Yi-hyun) wakes up from a six-year coma. She gets reassigned to the lost and found department, where she discovers that she's gained the supernatural ability to see ghosts connected to the objects left behind there. Along with her new partner, rookie cop Cha Gun-woo (Ok Taecyeon) who's a hotheaded skeptic, Shi-ohn uses the information to solve cold cases. Gun-woo only believes in tangible things he can see, hear and touch, but he gradually comes to trust Shi-ohn, and together, the bickering partners help the spirits fulfill their dying wishes and unfinished business before passing on to the afterlife.

One of the ghosts watching over Shi-ohn is her ex-boyfriend Lee Hyung-joon (Kim Jae-wook), another detective who died that night six years ago in the same incident that left Shi-ohn with a serious head injury that nearly killed her and left her comatose. They were working on a big case together, but Shi-ohn has no memory of what happened that fateful night.

== Cast ==
=== Main ===
- So Yi-hyun as Yang Shi-ohn
- Ok Taec-yeon as Cha Gun-woo
- Kim Jae-wook as Lee Hyung-joon

=== Supporting ===
- Kim Chang-wan as Choi Moon-shik
- Park Young-ji as Moon Heung-joo
- Kim Ki-chun as Jung Tae-soo
- Kim Kyung-beom as Team leader Bong
- Kim Ye-won as Jang Hee-bin
- Noh Young-hak as Im Sung-chan
- Oh Hee-joon as Seung-ha

=== Special appearances ===
- Moon Ga-young as Dan Oh-reum (ep. 1-2)
- Jo Seung-hyun as Bae Kyung-min (ep. 1-2)
- Jang Hyun-sung as Park Hyung-jin, psychiatrist (ep. 1-2)
- Kim Seung-soo as Park Eung-joon, prosecutor (ep. 3-4, 13)
- Kim Young-ran as Eung-joon's mother (ep. 3-4)
- Kim Byung-choon as Mr. Wang (ep. 9-10)
- Choi Woo-shik as Hee-koo, hacker (ep. 10, 12)
- Kim Yoon-hye as Im Jung-eun (ep. 16)

== Ratings ==
In this table, the blue numbers represent the lowest ratings and the red numbers represent the highest ratings.

Ep.	Original broadcast date	Average audience share
Ep.	Original broadcast date	AGB Nielsen
Ep.	Original broadcast date	Nationwide
1	July 29, 2013	0.595%
2	July 30, 2013	0.564%
3	August 5, 2013	0.652%
4	August 6, 2013	1.477%
5	August 12, 2013	1.295%
6	August 13, 2013	1.035%
7	August 19, 2013	1.359%
8	August 20, 2013	1.158%
9	August 26, 2013	1.407%
10	August 27, 2013	1.320%
11	September 2, 2013	1.250%
12	September 3, 2013	1.199%
13	September 9, 2013	1.106%
14	September 10, 2013	1.237%
15	September 16, 2013	0.961%
16	September 17, 2013	0.870%
Average		1.092%

- This drama airs on a cable channel/pay TV which normally has a relatively smaller audience compared to free-to-air TV/public broadcasters (KBS, SBS, MBC and EBS).

== International broadcast ==
- Japan - DATV: beginning April 2, 2014.
- Thailand - Workpoint TV: Beginning November 22, 2014. It is also available to stream on Iflix with subtitles.
- Sri Lanka: It is available to stream on Iflix with subtitles.
- Indonesia: It is available to stream on Iflix with subtitles.
- Malaysia: It is available to stream on Iflix with subtitles.
- Philippines: It is available to stream on Iflix with subtitles.
