= The Cat (2011 film) =

- Poster
- Hangul: 고양이 : 죽음을 보는 두 개의 눈
- RR: Goyangi : jugeumeul boneun du gaeui nun
- MR: Koyangi : chugŭmŭl ponŭn tu kaeŭi nun
- Directed by: Byun Seung-wook
- Written by: Jang Yun-mi
- Produced by: Lee Joon-dong
- Starring: Park Min-young; Kim Dong-wook; Kim Ye-ron
- Cinematography: Lee In-won
- Edited by: Kim Hyeon
- Music by: Lee Jae-jin
- Distributed by: Next Entertainment World
- Release date: July 7, 2011
- Running time: 106 minutes
- Country: South Korea
- Language: Korean

The Cat (Korean: 고양이: 죽음을보는 두개의눈; lit. 'The Cat: Eyes that See Death') is a 2011 South Korean horror film directed by Byun Seung-wook. The film is about So-yeon (Park Min-young), who works at a small pet-grooming shop called Kitty N Puppy. So-yeon has claustrophobia and starts having apparitions of a ghostly young girl with cat-like eyes (Kim Ye-ron).

== Plot ==
So-yeon is a kind woman who works as a groomer in a pet shop called Kitty N Puppy, but has claustrophobia due to childhood trauma. A woman comes to the pet shop to collect her Persian cat, Bidanyi, one day, after one of Bidanyi's lengthy checkups at the pet shop. The next day, the woman is found dead in an elevator, but Bidanyi is unharmed. The police are unable to determine the cause of her death. So-yeon's friend Kim Jun-seok, one of the police officers investigating the murder, gives her Bidanyi to look after, since she has already had experience with animals.

So-yeon starts to have nightmares of a young girl with cat-like eyes and is haunted by hallucinations. Jun-seok and his fellow officers watch CCTV footage of the woman who died and it's concluded that she died of a panic attack. So-yeon's friend Bo-hee, who recently adopted a cat, dies of a similar cause. That night, So-yeon cuts her finger while preparing food for Bidanyi. Bidanyi licks the blood and becomes aggressive. So-yeon, terrified, takes the cat to the dead woman's husband, but he does not want him. He explains that his wife claimed to be haunted by a strange little girl after buying Bidanyi. Disturbed, So-yeon leaves Bidanyi in a park. At the animal shelter, a staff member cremates a dead cat, but is pulled inside the furnace by an unseen force and burns to death.

Jun-seok and So-yeon go to the animal shelter, where they find dead cats and the charred remains of the staff member. They learn that some time ago, there was an infestation of stray cats in the boiler room of an apartment complex. The doors and windows were cemented shut and the cats were left to suffocate. Two weeks later, workers removed the dead cats. So-yeon remarks on the similarity of the murder victims all being found dead in a small space. She is again approached by a confused old woman she had encountered before, who is looking for her granddaughter. Jun-seok discovers that the old woman reported her missing granddaughter nine months ago, but her son closed the case. So-yeon escorts the woman back to her apartment - in the same complex where the stray cats lived in the boiler room - and Jun-seok gives her a photo of the granddaughter, who looks exactly like the cat-eyed girl So-yeon had seen in her hallucinations, the same one the dead woman had complained of seeing. So-yeon sees the old woman's son beating his mother; he is then killed by a horde of cats.

So-yeon goes to the complex's boiler room and is confronted by cats. While trying to fight off the hoarde, including Bidanyi, So-yeon falls into a large canister. The cat-eyed girl appears and shows her how she died; she had played with the cats in the boiler room, and upon hearing of the plans to kill them, she attempted to hide them in the canister. While climbing out, she fell and was paralyzed, dying with the cats after the door and windows were cemented. The girl also has a special relationship with those who have cats, and it is actually the restless spirits of the cats who have murdered the others. The girl convinces the cats to stop and they let So-yeon go free.

Having conquered her claustrophobia, So-yeon visits her father in a mental hospital, riding in an elevator for the first time without panicking. As she leaves, she and Ju-seok find a kitten underneath their car, and she kindly beckons toward it.

== Cast ==
- Park Min-young as So-yeon
- Kim Ye-ron as Hee-jin
- Kim Dong-wook as Jun-seok
- Shin Da-eun as Bo-hee
- Lee Sang-hee as animal pound doctor
- Jo Seok-hyun as Park Joo-im
- Park Hyun-young as Kim Soon-kyung
- Baek Soo-ryun as grandmother with dementia
- Lee Han-wi as pet shop owner
- Lee Joong-ok as Police chief Lee
- Seo Yi-sook as psychiatrist
- Lee Ji-hyun as veterinarian
- Kim Min-jae as animal rescue staff
- Jo Han-hee as women's association head
- Song Moon-soo as manager
- Lee Jung-gu as asylum doctor
- Kim Gye-seon as asylum receptionist
- Kim Ik-tae as So-yeon's father
- Lee Cheol-min as son of demented grandmother
- Lee Sung-min as Bidan's "papa"
- Yoon Ga-hyun as Bidan's "mom"

== Release ==
The Cat premiered in South Korea on July 7, 2011.

=== Box office ===
On its opening week, it grossed US$2,048,882 in South Korea, placing it at second place on the weekend box office chart. It grossed a total of US$4,514,589 in South Korea and US$4,461,042 in the foreign markets.

=== Critical reception ===
Film Business Asia gave the film a 5/10 review, saying it is "almost a paint-by-numbers example of a classic Korean horror...The Cat is a watchable curio and no more."
