= Her Private Life (TV series) =

2019 South Korean television series

- Promotional poster
- Hangul: 그녀의 사생활
- Hanja: 그女의 私生活
- RR: Geunyeoui sasaenghwal
- MR: Kŭnyŏŭi sasaenghwal
- Genre: Romantic comedy
- Based on: Noona Fan Dot Com by Kim Sung-yeon
- Developed by: Studio Dragon
- Written by: Kim Hye-young
- Directed by: Hong Jong-chan
- Starring: Park Min-young; Kim Jae-wook
- Music by: Choi In-hee
- Opening theme: "Help Me" by (G)I-dle
- Country of origin: South Korea
- Original language: Korean
- No. of episodes: 16

Production
- Running time: 60 minutes
- Production company: Bon Factory Worldwide

Original release
- Network: tvN
- Release: April 10 – May 30, 2019

Her Private Life (Korean: 그녀의 사생활) is a 2019 South Korean television series, created by Kim Hye-young and directed by Hong Jong-chan, starring Park Min-young and Kim Jae-wook. Developed by Studio Dragon and produced by Bon Factory Worldwide, the show is based on a web novel called Noona Fan Dot Com (Korean: 누나팬닷컴; RR: Nunapaendatkeom) written by Kim Sung-yeon and published in 2007. The series aired on tvN from April 10 to May 30, 2019.

== Synopsis ==
Sung Deok-mi (Park Min-young) is a talented chief curator of Cheum Museum of Art, who also happens to have a secret: she is a fangirl of White Ocean's Cha Shi-an (Jung Jae-won). In addition, she is the fansite manager of the famous "The Road to Sian" (Korean: 시안은 나의 길; RR: Sianeun naui gil; lit. 'Sian is My Way'), the abbreviation of which (Korean: 시나길; RR: Sinagil) she uses as her screen name. Ryan Gold (Kim Jae-wook) is a standoffish artist who develops Stendhal syndrome, eventually retiring as an artist. After the current boss, Uhm So-hye (Kim Sun-young), is investigated for embezzlement, Ryan Gold becomes the new Art Director of Cheum Museum of Art.

After unfounded rumors break out claiming Deok-mi and Shi-an are dating, Ryan suggests he and Deok-mi pretend to date to ward off Shi-an's fans who threaten to harm her. However, Kim Hyo-jin (Kim Bo-ra), Um So-hye's spoiled daughter, who is another fansite manager of Cha Shi-an under the pseudonym Sindy, (a fact unknown to her mother as she would strongly disapprove), manages to land a job as an intern in the museum, seeking to prove that Ryan and Deok-mi are a fake couple. This leaves them both no choice but to continue the act even at work, and they eventually fall in love.

== Cast ==
=== Lead characters ===
- Park Min-young as Sung Deok-mi / Sinagil
  - Park So-yi as young Sung Deok-mi

The chief curator at Cheum Museum of Art who often does not get credit for the work she does under Director Eom, an incompetent socialite. She runs a fan website called "The Road to Sian" which she intends on keeping secret. She later falls in love with Ryan.

- Kim Jae-wook as Ryan Gold / Heo Yoon-je
  - Choi Go as young Ryan Gold

The standoffish new art director of Cheum Museum of Art who is very strict and is allergic to caffeine. After seeing Lee Sol's painting, he develops Stendhal syndrome which prohibits him from painting, eventually leading to his retirement. He is also famous in New York for his perspective on new artists. He eventually falls in love with Deok-mi.

=== Supporting characters ===
People around Sung Deok-mi

- Ahn Bo-hyun as Nam Eun-gi
  - Yang Hee-won as young Nam Eun-gi

An Olympic silver medalist in judo who opens his own gym and becomes an instructor. After his single mother abandoned him in the hospital, Deok-mi's mother took him in and raised him with Deok-mi as family. He harbours secret love for Deok-mi.

- Park Jin-joo as Lee Seon-joo

Deok-mi's best friend who is the owner of CocoMoco café, which Deok-mi, Ryan, and Eun-gi frequent. Like Deok-mi, she is also a fangirl of Cha Shi-an, and she often voices out her sadness that she can no longer be a full-time fan after becoming a mother. She helps with the creation of Ryan and Deok-mi's fake relationship. After seeing her employee, Joo-hyuk, at a concert, she becomes a fan and makes and runs a fansite for him.

- Kim Mi-kyung as Go Young-sook

Deok-mi's mother who is a knitting-obsessed woman that is often portrayed as the head of the household. She urges Deok-mi to give up being a fangirl, citing it would be difficult for her to date since men would find her hobby off-putting. Not knowing Ryan and Deok-mi's relationship is fake, she becomes ecstatic and treats Ryan as her future son-in-law, inviting him for dinner and giving him side dishes.

- Maeng Sang-hoon as Sung Geun-ho

Deok-mi's father who is a quiet, soft-spoken man that began collecting suiseki stones after his business failed. He is completely immersed in taking care of his rocks, which annoys his wife.

- Park Myung-shin as Nam Se-yeon

A chief editor of an art magazine and mother of Nam Eun-gi. After having personal troubles, she allowed Young-sook to care for her son since he was an infant. Young-sook and Se-yeon become friends and accept that they are both the mother of Eun-gi. Although she has a good relationship with her son, he often calls her "Editor Nam" while he calls Young-sook "Mom", which she doesn't seem to mind.

People around Ryan Gold

- Hong Seo-young as Choi Da-in

A visual art director from New York who is in love with Ryan, her friend of ten years. She follows Ryan and moves to South Korea. She works at Cheum Museum of Art in collaboration with Cha Shi-an for his upcoming album and art exhibition. Feeling dejected after learning about Ryan and Deok-mi's relationship, she becomes happy when Eun-gi tells her that their relationship is fake.

- Jung Jae-won as Cha Shi-an / Sian (stage name)

An idol and the most popular member of the boy group, White Ocean (Korean: 화이트오션; RR: Hwaiteuosyeon). He adores the fansite "The Road to Sian", stating that it is the only fansite whose owner seems to understand him. He is a fan of artist Lee Sol, and plans on collecting all of her nine paintings. He grows close to Ryan Gold after learning that they are neighbors.

- Lee Il-hwa as Gong Eun-young / Lee Sol

A retired artist who caused Ryan Gold's Stendhal syndrome, and Ryan's biological mother.

Cheum Museum of Art

- Kim Sun-young as Eom So-hye

A wealthy and eccentric former art director of Cheum Museum of Art, who resigned after an investigation for embezzlement and slush funds. Despite resigning, she plans on taking back her position after the investigation is completed. She remains a powerful authority in the museum after becoming the head director of TK Cultural Foundation, which funds the museum. She uses her connections to get her daughter, Sindy, a job in Cheum Museum of Art as an intern.

- Kim Bo-ra as Cindy / Kim Hyo-jin

An investigative intern in Cheum Museum of Art and the daughter of the former art director, Uhm So-hye. She is a fan of Cha Shi-an and runs a fansite called "Sindy" where she calls out Deok-mi as Shi-an's girlfriend. After an article comes out reporting that Ryan and Deok-mi are dating, Hyo-jin uses her mother's connections to get a job in Cheum Museum of Art. She makes another site called "CUPATCH" where she investigates the validity of Ryan and Deok-mi's relationship. Eventually, it is shown that she becomes a part of the Cheum Museum family through her determination, creativity, and hard work.

- Kim Chang-hoi as Secretary Kim

So-hye's secretary who often helps to hide Hyo-jin's fangirling activities from her mother.

- Seo Ye-hwa as Yoo Kyung-ah
- Jung Won-chang as Kim Yoo-seob

Others

- Im Ji-kyu as Kang Seung-min

Seon-joo's husband who is a television documentary series director that hopes to switch to variety shows after the release of his current documentary.

- Jung Si-yul as Kang Geon-woo

Seon-joo's son

- Yoo Yong-min as Joo-hyuk

Seon-joo's part-time employee who often breaks cups while working. He is the vocalist and guitarist of an underground band called Fade.

=== Special appearances ===
- IN2IT as other members of idol group White Ocean (Ep. 1)
  - Hyunuk
  - Inho
  - Inpyo
  - Jiahn
- Kim Ho-chang as Ryan Gold's senior and psychiatrist (Ep. 1)
- Kim Young-ok as Deok-mi's grandmother (Ep. 4)
- Seo Sang-won as Noh Suk, a writer who is Yoon Tae-hwa's friend (Ep. 5)
- Hwang Hyo-eun as Latte, Ryan Gold's avatar (Ep. 5, 9)
- Jung Soo-young as fortune teller possessed by French spirit (Ep. 7)
- Park Seul-gi as MC of Cha Shi-an's autograph session (Ep. 7)
- Lee Han-wi as Kim Moo-san, Uhm So-hye's husband (Ep. 16)

== Production ==
- The first script reading was held on February 25, 2019 with the attendance of the cast and crew.
- It is the second time that Kim Mi-kyung portrays Park Min-young's mother in a television series, after Sungkyunkwan Scandal (2010).

== Original soundtrack ==
Her Private Life OST

Soundtrack album by Various artists
- Released: 2019
- Genre: Soundtrack
- Languages: Korean; English
- Label: Stone Music Entertainment

=== Part 1 ===
Released on April 11, 2019
No.	Title	Lyrics	Music	Artist	Length
1.	"Help Me"	Park Geun-cheol; Lim Hyun-joon; Soyeon	Park Geun-cheol; Lim Hyun-joon	(G)I-DLE	3:58
2.	"Help Me" (Inst.)		Park Geun-cheol; Lim Hyun-joon		3:58
Total length:					7:56

=== Part 2 ===
Released on April 18, 2019
No.	Title	Lyrics	Music	Artist	Length
1.	"Floating" (둥둥)	Kim Ho-kyung	1601	Hong Dae-kwang	3:22
2.	"Floating" (Inst.)		1601		3:22
Total length:					6:44

=== Part 3 ===
Released on April 25, 2019
No.	Title	Lyrics	Music	Artist	Length
1.	"Shining Star"	Glody	Glody; Vulcan4; Hidden Card	IN2IT	2:56
2.	"Shining Star" (Inst.)		Glody; Vulcan4; Hidden Card		2:56
Total length:					5:52

=== Part 4 ===
Released on May 2, 2019
No.	Title	Lyrics	Music	Artist	Length
1.	"Maybe"	Galactika	Athena; Galactika	Lee Hae-ri (Davichi)	3:48
2.	"Maybe" (Inst.)		Athena; Galactika		3:48
Total length:					7:36

=== Part 5 ===
Released on May 9, 2019
No.	Title	Lyrics	Music	Artist	Length
1.	"Happy"	Joo Seong-geun; Alan JS Han	Oh Ji-hyeon; Joo Seong-geun	1415	3:05
2.	"Happy" (Inst.)		Oh Ji-hyeon; Joo Seong-geun		3:05
Total length:					6:10

=== Part 6 ===
Released on May 16, 2019
No.	Title	Lyrics	Music	Artist	Length
1.	"Think of You"	Kim Ho-kyung	1601	Ha Sung-woon	4:18
2.	"Think of You" (Inst.)		1601		4:18
Total length:					8:36

=== Part 7 ===
Released on May 23, 2019
No.	Title	Lyrics	Music	Artist	Length
1.	"Smile Again"	Park Geun-chul; DANI	RUNY; JUNO	RUNY	3:21
2.	"Smile Again" (Inst.)		RUNY; JUNO		3:21
Total length:					6:42

Disc 2:
No.	Title	Artist	Length
1.	"Starstruck Accident"	Various Artists	2:14
2.	"Hello!Ryan gold Hello!"	Various Artists	2:08
3.	"Romance of Deokhoo"	Various Artists	2:25
4.	"Mr. Wolf"	Various Artists	1:53
5.	"Trauma"	Various Artists	3:37
6.	"Ddu Ddu"	Various Artists	2:22
7.	"Thinking Lion"	Various Artists	2:22
8.	"Lazy Violin"	Various Artists	2:27
9.	"Code name Sinagil"	Various Artists	2:38
10.	"Rabbit Couple"	Various Artists	2:55
11.	"Photo Zone"	Various Artists	1:30
12.	"Water Drops"	Various Artists	2:50
13.	"The goddess of cannon"	Various Artists	2:07
14.	"U, Who?"	Various Artists	2:03
15.	"Good and Gone"	Various Artists	3:20
16.	"The Age of Deokhoo"	Various Artists	2:15
17.	"Draw the Line"	Various Artists	1:57
18.	"Home Master"	Various Artists	2:32
19.	"Story of us"	Various Artists	4:45
20.	"The best golden lion"	Various Artists	1:58
21.	"The Picture of the Water drops"	Various Artists	2:13
22.	"Idol fan club"	Various Artists	2:50
23.	"I like you"	Various Artists	4:00
24.	"Deokjil Mate"	Various Artists	2:06
25.	"Sweet Day"	Various Artists	1:08
26.	"Crayon"	Various Artists	1:49
27.	"Deokhoo's song"	Various Artists	1:59
28.	"Busy Day"	Various Artists	1:27
29.	"The game of wit"	Various Artists	1:46
30.	"Like this"	Various Artists	2:14
31.	"Missing"	Various Artists	4:08
32.	"Deokming out"	Various Artists	1:53
Total length:			77:51

== Viewership ==
Her Private Life : South Korea viewers per episode (thousands)

Season	Episode number																Average
Season	1	2	3	4	5	6	7	8	9	10	11	12	13	14	15	16	Average
1	624	596	656	677	688	644	672	739	787	691	703	747	658	610	636	629	672

Source: Audience measurement performed nationwide by Nielsen Media Research.

Average TV viewership ratings
Ep.	Original broadcast date	Average audience share		
Ep.	Original broadcast date	AGB Nielsen		TNmS
Ep.	Original broadcast date	Nationwide	Seoul	Nationwide
1	April 10, 2019	2.661%	3.572%	3.395%
2	April 11, 2019	2.410%	2.921%	3.504%
3	April 17, 2019	2.432%	2.576%	3.153%
4	April 18, 2019	2.347%	2.600%	3.120%
5	April 24, 2019	2.539%	3.079%	3.091%
6	April 25, 2019	2.675%	3.392%	2.986%
7	May 1, 2019	2.716%	3.364%	3.213%
8	May 2, 2019	2.808%	3.246%	3.608%
9	May 8, 2019	3.085%	3.381%	3.814%
10	May 9, 2019	2.730%	3.243%	3.368%
11	May 15, 2019	2.697%	3.250%	3.808%
12	May 16, 2019	2.793%	3.587%	3.570%
13	May 22, 2019	2.655%	3.008%	3.346%
14	May 23, 2019	2.735%	2.888%	3.478%
15	May 29, 2019	2.474%	2.618%	3.495%
16	May 30, 2019	2.864%	3.341%	3.279%
Average		2.664%	3.129%	3.389%
In the table above, the blue numbers represent the lowest ratings and the red numbers represent the highest ratings.; This drama aired on a cable channel/pay TV which normally has a relatively smaller audience compared to free-to-air TV/public broadcasters (KBS, SBS, MBC and EBS).

== Awards and nominations ==
Year	Award	Category	Recipient	Result	Ref.
2019	12th Korea Drama Awards	Best Original Soundtrack	"Maybe" (Lee Hae-ri)	Nominated	
