= Confidence Queen (TV series) =

2025 South Korean TV series

- Promotional poster
- Hangul: 컨피던스 맨 KR
- RR: Keonpideonseu maen KR
- MR: K'ŏnp'idŏnsŭ maen KR
- Genre: Crime; Comedy
- Based on: The Confidence Man JP by Ryôta Kosawa
- Written by: Hong Seung-hyun; Kim Da-hye
- Directed by: Nam Ki-hoon
- Starring: Park Min-young; Park Hee-soon; Joo Jong-hyuk
- Country of origin: South Korea
- Original language: Korean
- No. of episodes: 12

Production
- Running time: 61 minutes
- Production companies: TME Group; GHOST4 Production; The Fifth Wall Studio

Original release
- Network: TV Chosun; Coupang Play; Prime Video
- Release: September 6 – October 12, 2025

Related
- The Confidence Man JP

Confidence Queen (Korean: 컨피던스 맨 KR) is a 2025 South Korean crime comedy television series starring Park Min-young, Park Hee-soon and Joo Jong-hyuk. A remake of the original Japanese 2018 drama, The Confidence Man JP, the series follows three con artists who devise elaborate and unconventional schemes to exploit individuals driven by greed, set against the backdrop of the real estate and financial sectors. It premiered on TV Chosun on September 6, 2025, aired every Saturday and Sunday at 22:30 (KST). It is available to stream on Coupang Play in South Korea and on Prime Video in 240 countries (excluding Mainland China and South Korea).

On September 16, 2025, TV Chosun announced the change of broadcast time to 22:30 from earlier 21:10 (KST) starting from the fifth episode, due to the low viewership.

== Cast and characters ==
=== Main ===
- Park Min-young as Yoon Yi-rang

The leader of Team Confidence Man, a genius conman in the top 1% of South Korea with an IQ of 165

  - Ki So-yu as young Yoon Yi-rang
- Park Hee-soon as James

The spiritual pillar of Team Confidence Man, a middle-aged man who exemplifies French chic.

- Joo Jong-hyuk as Myung Gu-ho

He is the youngest member of Team Confidence Man, with a pure and upright personality and a tall and handsome appearance

=== Supporting ===
- Hyun Bong-sik as Mr. Mule, porter in episode 1
- Kim Young-mi

=== Cameo ===
- Song Ji-hyo as Baek-hwa, a shaman (Episode 1)
- Lee Bong-ryun as Yesol's mother (Episode 1)
- Jung Woong-in as Jeon Tae-soo, loan shark kingpin (Episode 1, 2)
- Jung Yi-joo as Kim Bo-ra, an art student with dreams (Episodes 3, 4)
- Lee Yi-kyung as Yoo Myung-min, art critic, a buyer for the world's top auction house.
- Choi Hong-il as Kim Yong-bok, a master of forgery
- Rowoon as a manager, (Episodes 3, 4)
- Kim Joo-ah as Han Jae-hee, victim of a botched surgery
- Kim Sun-young as Jae-kyung Hospital's CEO Lee Sun-mi
- Ha Jun as surgeon, Jo Sung-woo
- Kwon Da-ham as Im Kwang-sik
- Kim Han-jong as Mr. Mustache
- Yoon Chae-kyung as Lee Hye-yoon, beauty YouTuber and victim of Gil Mi-in
- Oh Na-ra as Gil Mi-in, the CEO of Mystique
- Yura as gas station worker
- Yoo Seung-mok as Lee Sung-min
- Park Myung-hoon as Ha Jung-ho, CEO of HaHaJungho, a large-scale seafood distribution company
- Kim Byeong-chun as Oh Chang-dae, factory owner
- Kim Bo-sung as himself
- Kim Tae-hoon as Kang Yo-seop, a famous architect and professor, CEO of Josef Architects
- Kang Nam-gil as Mr. Jo Man-bok
- Um Hyo-sup as Yoo Sang-won, Minister of Land, Infrastructure and Transport
- Jung Ae-yeon as Lee Na-ra,lawyer and acting representative of Jay Fund International
- Han Groo as Ko Sang-hee, girlfriend of James
- Yeo Hoe-hyun as Oracle Engineering and the second-generation tycoon

== Production ==
The series is the first Korean original drama for Prime Video. It is a joint collaboration with Coupang Play and TV Chosun, directed by Nam Ki-hoon, written by Hong Sung-hyun, who wrote Cheo Yong (2013), Criminal Minds (2017), and produced by the production company TME Group in association with GHOST4 Production and The Fifth Wall Studio.

On July 23, 2024, it was reported that Park Min-young was considering to appear in the series in lead role. On July 11, 2025, it was confirmed that Song Ji-hyo would make a special appearance in the series. The script reading photos were revealed on August 11, 2025.

The series began filming in September 2024 and finished filming all 12 episodes in May 2025. Park Min-young shared photos showcasing the various characters she portrayed in the series; one such character is of a flight attendant, the scenes for which were filmed at Clark International Airport in Pampanga, Philippines.

== Release and reception ==
The first Korean 'Amazon Original Drama' started streaming on Prime Video globally (excluding Mainland China and South Korea) and Coupang Play in South Korea on September 6, 2025.

The series was at the 9th place in the worldwide rankings of Amazon Prime TV shows after the release of episodes 1 and 2. On September 12, it was reported that the series is at 5th place worldwide in the Amazon Prime TV and 4th place in Coupang Play's popular shows as of September 10.

The series ended on October 12, 2025. It ranked among the top 8 most-watched shows worldwide on Amazon Prime TV, and placed in the top 3 on Coupang Play’s weekly list of most popular shows.

== Episodes ==
No.	Title	Original release date
1	"Speed Dial 0"	September 6, 2025
Yoon Yi-rang, the leader of Team Confidence Man, targets Baek Hwa, a swindler who deceived a concerned mother, Yesol-mo. Using a staged casino and a team of disguised allies—Myung Gu-ho and James; they manipulate Baek Hwa into a high-stakes gamble that ends in chaos, betrayal, and a bag of talismans instead of cash. Gu-ho, wounded and disillusioned, retires to a quiet seaside life, but he is drawn back when James is injured during a solo mission against their next target, Jeon Tae-soo. Yi-rang infiltrates 'Rising Airlines' as a flight attendant, while Gu-ho poses as the chairman’s illegitimate son to bait Jeon. Their plan unfolds across an airport and a swapped suitcase full of cash, culminating in a tense confrontation where Jeon, suspicious, points a gun at Gu-ho. In the epilogue, Yi-rang quietly restores justice to Yesol-mo, by returning the cash shaman has taken from her.
2	"Sand Foundation"	September 7, 2025
In this episode, Jeon Tae-soo tests the loyalty of Yoon Yi-rang and Myung Gu-ho by entrusting them with a secretive mission to the Philippines involving a password-protected hard drive. Their journey turns into chaos when they’re kidnapped, only for Jeon Tae-soo to dramatically appear at crucial point, deepening his trust in Gu-ho. As pressure mounts from upcoming investigations, Jeon plans a scheme to smuggle 50 billion won in slush funds disguised as relief supplies aboard a chartered plane. But the plan unravels mid-flight when Yi-rang and James, posing as a co-pilot execute a daring heist, dumping the money overboard and leaving Jeon Tae-soo with worthless paper. The elaborate con was later revealed culminating in the stolen funds being anonymously donated to a youth shelter. As Jeon Tae-soo is arrested for child abuse and confinement, Yi-rang’s mysterious behavior hints at a deeper motive.
3	"Déjà vu"	September 13, 2025
The episode opened with a lavish VIP charity auction, where Team Confidence Man—Yoon Yi-rang, Myung Gu-ho, and James—executed a daring con against art critic Yoo Myung-min. Disguised in glamorous roles, they infiltrated the event to steal incriminating evidence from Yoo’s office, but their plan hit a snag when the safe didn’t contain what they expected. The episode then revealed their motive: Yoo had harassed a young artist and was involved in art fraud and illegal cultural trade. Yi-rang, initially reluctant, joined the mission after discovering a personal connection to one of Yoo’s paintings. The team baited Yoo with a forged masterpiece, which he failed to detect, boosting their confidence, until their forger was suddenly arrested, and Yoo turned toward them, raising the stakes with a tense question look!.
4	"Ghost Castle"	September 14, 2025
Yi-rang, Gu-ho, and James expose Mr. Famous, who imprisoned young artists, forced them to work, and used them to launder money through fictitious auctions. During a charity gala, they obtain a USB stick containing evidence, and Yi-rang organises a provocation with the fake artist Myeong-shin, which leads to Mr Famous being ridiculed at the auction. Bo-ra reveals the truth and shows recordings of the abuse, and the police arrest Mr Famous. Yi-rang deletes the ‘Ghost Castle’ file from the USB stick, suggesting her personal connection to the past and trauma, which James discovers. Translated with DeepL.com (free version)
5	"Atoms Black Noir"	September 20, 2025
Yoon Yi-rang, James, and Myung Gu-ho reconnect with young patient Han Jae-hee at Jae-kyung Hospital and uncover medical negligence linked to CEO Lee Sun-mi and surgeon Jo Sung-woo. After Jae-hee’s condition worsens due to a botched surgery, the trio initiates a revenge plan. Yi-rang confronts Lee Sun-mi, while James infiltrates her circle by posing as a VVIP broker and manipulating her trust through staged encounters and drug-laced gifts. Lee Sun-mi is tricked into believing she has a life-threatening aortic condition and desperately seeks help from "Rachel," a legendary ghost surgeon—unaware that Rachel is Yi-rang in disguise. As panic sets in, Lee Sun-mi agrees to pay US$2.5 million for the surgery. The episode ends with Yi-rang entering the operating room in full scrubs, setting the stage for a dramatic climax.
6	"Waves on the Edge"	September 21, 2025
7	"Mask Girl"	September 27, 2025
8	"Mr. Gray"	September 28, 2025
9	"Their First Encounter"	October 4, 2025
10	"Madame Oh's Heydays"	October 5, 2025
11	"The Falling Out"	October 11, 2025
12	"Checkmate"	October 12, 2025

== Original soundtrack ==
Confidence Queen

Soundtrack album by Various
- Released: 2025
- Genre: Soundtrack
- Language: Korean; English
- Label: Warner Music Group/ADA; Leon Korea Co., Ltd.

=== Part 1 ===
Released on September 6, 2025
No.	Title	Lyrics	Music	Artist	Length
1.	"Got Me Good"	Lee Jun-hwa, GA EUN	Lee Jun-hwa, GA EUN	Ahn Shin-ae	3:03
2.	"Got Me Good" (Inst.)				3:03
Total length:					6:06

=== Part 2 ===
Released on September 13, 2025
No.	Title	Lyrics	Music	Artist	Length
1.	"Lights, Camera, Action"	Lee Jun-hwa	Lee Jun-hwa	Hui	3:29
2.	"Lights, Camera, Action" (Inst.)				3:29
Total length:					6:58

=== Part 3 ===
Released on September 20, 2025
No.	Title	Lyrics	Music	Artist	Length
1.	"No Turning Back"	Lee Yong-min (UrbaneMusic), Ameno	Lee Yong-min, Choi Jae-hyuk (UrbaneMusic)	Keonhee (Oneus)	3:20
2.	"No Turning Back" (Inst.)				3:20
Total length:					6:40

=== Part 4 ===
Released on September 27, 2025
No.	Title	Lyrics	Music	Artist	Length
1.	"Bleed It Out"	Junhwa Lee	Junhwa Lee, Ameno	Elaine	4:02
2.	"Bleed It Out" (Inst.)				4:02
Total length:					8:04

=== Part 5 ===
Released on October 4, 2025
No.	Title	Lyrics	Music	Artist	Length
1.	"Am I Wrong"	Ji Seong-ho, Ameno	NadaNiel, Ji Seong	Leenzy	3:01
2.	"Am I Wrong" (Inst.)				3:01
Total length:					6:02

=== Part 6 ===
Released on October 11, 2025
No.	Title	Lyrics	Music	Artist	Length
1.	"Giddy Up"	Lee Jun-hwa	Lee Jun-hwa	Iraon	2:26
2.	"Giddy Up" (Inst.)				2:26
Total length:					4:52

== Viewership ==
Confidence Queen : South Korea viewers per episode (thousands)

Episodes	Episode number											
Episodes	1	2	3	4	5	6	7	8	9	10	11	12
1–12	N/A	363	N/A	N/A	287	330	360	397	292	N/A	323	N/A

Source: Audience measurement performed nationwide by Nielsen Korea.

Average TV viewership ratings
Ep.	Original broadcast date	Average audience share (Nielsen Korea)	
Ep.	Original broadcast date	Nationwide	Seoul
1	September 6, 2025	1.1% (13th)	N/A
2	September 7, 2025	1.484% (9th)	1.479% (9th)
3	September 13, 2025	1% (15th)	N/A
4	September 14, 2025	0.9% (24th)	N/A
5	September 20, 2025	1.303% (9th)	1.274% (4th)
6	September 21, 2025	1.571% (4th)	1.517% (5th)
7	September 27, 2025	1.771% (4th)	1.734% (3rd)
8	September 28, 2025	1.772% (6th)	1.689% (5th)
9	October 4, 2025	1.467% (7th)	1.185% (10th)
10	October 5, 2025	0.7% (31th)	N/A
11	October 11, 2025	1.4% (11th)	1.358% (8th)
12	October 12, 2025	1.4% (12th)	1.504% (9th)
Average		N/A	N/A
In the table above, the blue numbers represent the lowest ratings and the red numbers represent the highest ratings.; N/A denotes that the ratings were not published.; NR denotes that the series did not rank in the top 20 daily programs on that date.; This series aired on a cable channel/pay TV which normally has a relatively smaller audience compared to free-to-air TV/public broadcasters (KBS, SBS, MBC, and EBS).
