= Kim Jae-wook =

South Korean model and actor (born 1983)

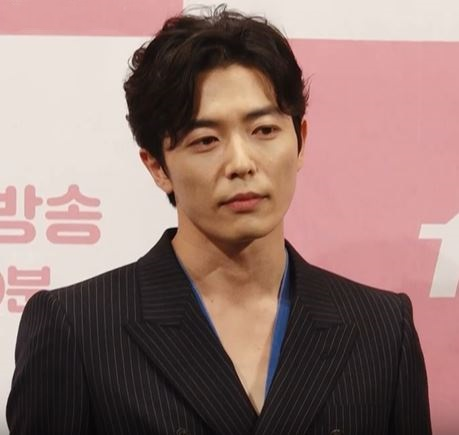
- Kim in 2019
- Born: April 2, 1983 (age 43); Seoul, South Korea
- Other name: Kim Jae-uck
- Education: Dankook High School; Seoul Institute of the Arts
- Occupations: Actor; model; singer
- Years active: 2002–present
- Agent: Management SOOP

Korean name
- Hangul: 김재욱
- RR: Gim Jaeuk
- MR: Kim Chaeuk

Kim Jae-wook (Korean: 김재욱; born April 2, 1983) is a South Korean model and actor. He is best known for his roles in the hit series Coffee Prince (2007), comedy film Antique (2008), mystery drama Who Are You? (2013), Voice (2017), The Guest (2018), Her Private Life (2019), and Crazy Love (2022). He is fluent in Japanese, and played the role of Sō Takeyuki, the Japanese husband of Princess Deokhye, in the film The Last Princess (2016).

== Early life ==
Kim was born in Seoul, and grew up in Tokyo, Japan until he was seven years old before returning to South Korea. His father worked as a journalist and was transferred to Japan as a foreign correspondent. He started out performing in a band, and began modelling at age 17. Due to the time he spent in Japan, he can speak fluent Japanese.

== Career ==
=== 2002–2011: Career beginnings and breakthrough ===
In 2002, Kim debuted as the member of an indie band in the MBC drama Ruler of Your Own World. After this first role, he concentrated on his modeling career for 5 years. In 2007, he auditioned for and won the role of No Sun-ki in the 2007 hit drama series Coffee Prince. The role shot him to fame in both South Korea and several Asian countries. He later appeared in the 2008 drama The Kingdom of The Winds, and served as the ambassador of goodwill for the 9th Jeonju International Film Festival (JIFF) in May 2008.

Kim then starred in his first film, Antique, based on the manga Antique Bakery, which was invited to the 59th Berlin International Film Festival. He played a gay chef working at a bakery. He won the Best New Actor award at the 16th Korea Culture and Entertainment Awards. In October 2009, he formed a modern rock band named Walrus, where he served as guitarist and vocal. The name of the group came from the Beatles single "I am the Walrus".

Kim got his first leading role in Bee TV's South Korean-Japanese drama Give Me Your Memory: Pygmalion's Love, which aired in March 2010. The same year, he starred in the melodrama television series Bad Guy, and featured in the romantic comedy series Marry Me, Mary!.

Before enlisting to military service in 2011, he played in rock musical, Hedwig And the Angry Inch, from May 14 until June 19, 2011.

=== 2013–2016: Comeback ===
After finishing his mandatory military service, Kim made his comeback in the 2013 television series Who Are You?, playing the dead boyfriend of So Yi-hyun's character. In 2014, Kim was featured in KBS' period action drama Inspiring Generation as Kim Hyun-joong's rival, but quit after episode 8 due to unavoidable circumstances.

In 2015, Kim was cast for the lead role in the fantasy comedy film Planck Constant, playing a script writer with weird sexual fantasies. In June, Kim signed an exclusive contract with management agency Better ENT.

The following year, Kim took on the role of a Japanese nobleman who marries Son Ye-jin's character Princess Deokhye in the period film The Last Princess. The same year, Kim took a leading role in the film Two Rooms, Two Nights as a popular movie director who tries to maintain secretive romantic relationships with both his current girlfriend and ex-girlfriend.

=== 2017–present: Rising popularity ===
In January 2017, Kim starred in romance film Another Way, playing the role of a police officer who finds Seo Yea-ji's character online and forms a suicide pact. He then played the antagonist in OCN's hit thriller drama Voice, earning acclaim for his performance as a serial killer. In June, he left Better ENT and signed with new management agency Management SOOP. In July, Kim was cast in the romance drama Temperature of Love, playing a rich businessman.

In 2018, Kim was cast in the musical play Amadeus in triple casting, alongside Jo Jung-suk and Kim Sung-kyu. Kim's Japanese film Butterfly Sleep was released in Japan in May 2018. The same year, he was cast in OCN's supernatural thriller The Guest. In 2019, Kim was cast as the main lead in the romantic comedy drama Her Private Life alongside Park Min-young. The show marks Kim's first time as a primary lead in a romantic comedy. In 2020, Kim created "My Margiela", a five-episode video series on the Belgian fashion designer Martin Margiela. In 2022, Kim starred alongside Krystal Jung in KBS2 television series Crazy Love, playing a maths instructor and CEO of a top math institute.

In 2025, Kim starred in Netflix's mystery historical television series Dear Hongrang alongside Jo Bo-ah and Lee Jae-wook. It is based on Tangeum: Swallowing Gold by Jang Da-hye and was produced by Studio Dragon.

== Personal life ==
=== Bibliography ===
In May 2011, along with fashion models Jang Yoon-ju, Ji Hyun-jung, Han Hye-jin and Song Kyung-ah, he co-authored Top Model, a book based on their experiences in the industry.

=== Military service ===
He enlisted for mandatory military service on July 5, 2011 for 21 months of active duty after five weeks of basic military training.

== Filmography ==
=== Film ===
Year	Title	Role	Notes	Ref.
2006	Monopoly			
2008	Antique	Min Sun-woo (Ono)		
2010	Heart of Gold	Yoo-sung		
2010	Bang	Alex		
2015	C'est Si Bon	Kang Myung-chan	Cameo	
2015	Planck Constant	Kim Woo-joo		
2016	Two Rooms, Two Nights	In-sung		
2016	The Last Princess	So Takeyuki		
2017	Another Way	Soo-wan		
2018	Butterfly Sleep	Soh Chan-hae		

=== Television ===
Year	Title	Role	Notes	Ref.
2002	Ruler of Your Own World	Ki-hong	Band member	
2007	Coffee Prince	Noh Sun-ki		
2007	Dal-ja's Spring	Choon-ha		
2008	The Kingdom of the Winds	Chu Bal-so		
2010	Give Me Your Memory: Pygmalion's Love	Kim Gyeon		
2010	Bad Guy	Hong Tae-sung		
2010	Marry Me, Mary!	Byun Jung-in		
2013	Who Are You?	Lee Hyung-joon		
2014	Inspiring Generation	Kim Soo-ok		
2014	Drama Festival: "4teen"	Adult Joon-yi	Cameo	
2015	Sweet Temptation	Seok-min		
2017	Voice	Mo Tae-gu		
2017	Temperature of Love	Park Jung-woo		
2018	The Guest	Choi Yoon		
2018	Quiz of God 5: Reboot		Cameo	
2019	Her Private Life	Ryan Gold		
2022	Crazy Love	Noh Go-jin		
2023–2024	Death's Game	Jung Gyu-cheol	Cameo	
2025	Melo Movie	Ko Jun		
2025	Dear Hongrang	Grand Prince Hanpyeong	Episodes 1, 3, 7–8	
2026	To My Beloved Thief	Old Man	Cameo (ep.16)	
2026	Filing for Love	Jeon Jae-yeol		

=== Music video appearances ===
Year	Song title	Artist	Notes	Ref.
2007	"Ice Fortress"	Dear Cloud		
2011	"Seoul Witch"	Walrus		
2011	"To be"	Walrus		
2015	"The Brand New Blues"	I am not		
2019	"Special"	Dickpunks	Friendship appearance	
2019	"OO DA DA"	Sumin		
2024	"Curse"	Jung Joonil		

=== Video games ===
Year	Title	Role	Publisher	Note	Ref.
2023	Like a Dragon Gaiden: The Man Who Erased His Name	Homare Nishitani III	Sega	Speaks in Japanese. Credited as Kim Jae-uck in credits	

== Stage ==
=== Musical ===
Musical play performances
Year	Title		Role	Theater	Date	Ref.
Year	English	Korean	Role	Theater	Date	Ref.
2011	Hedwig and the Angry Inch	헤드윅	Hedwig	KT&G Sangsang Art Hall	May 14 to June 19	
2024	Pagwa	파과	Tu-woo (Bullfighting)	Hongik University Daehakro Arts Center, Grand Theater	March 15, 2024 – May 26, 2024	

=== Theater ===
Theater play performances
Year	Title		Role	Theater	Date	Ref.
Year	English	Korean	Role	Theater	Date	Ref.
2018	Amadeus	아마데우스	Wolfgang Amadeus Mozart	Gwanglim Art Center BBCH Hall	February 27 to April 29	
2021	Minstrel Park In-hwan		Himself	Inje Haneul Nerin Centre Grand Performance Hall	August 14	
2025	White Rabbit, Red Rabbit		Himself	Sejong Center for the Performing Arts S Theater	May 4	
2025	Amadeus	아마데우스	Antonio Salieri	Hongik University Daehakro Arts Center, Grand Theater	September 16 to November 23	

== Discography ==
Year	Song	Album name	Publisher	Agency	Ref.
2011	"To Be"	Walrus The Single	Sony Music	CJ	
2011	"Mozaic"	Walrus The Single	Sony Music	CJ	
2011	"Seoul Witch"	Walrus The Single	Sony Music	CJ	
2014	"Reorganize"	Walrus The 2nd Single	Sony Music	SSS Records	
2014	"It's Alright"	Walrus The 2nd Single	Sony Music	SSS Records	
2014	"Summer Rain"	Walrus The 2nd Single	Sony Music	SSS Records	

== Awards and nominations ==
Year presented, name of the award ceremony, award category, nominated work and the result of the nomination
Year	Award	Category	Nominee / Work	Result	Ref.
2007	1st Korea Drama Awards	Netizen Popularity Award	Coffee Prince	Won	
2008	16th Korea Culture and Entertainment Awards	Best New Actor	Antique	Won	
2008	Asia Model Awards	Fashionista Award	Kim Jae-wook	Won	
2013	Japan's Korean Wave 10th Anniversary Korean TV Drama Awards	Jury Special Award	Kim Jae-wook	Won	
2017	SBS Drama Awards	Excellence Award, Actor in a Monday–Tuesday Drama	Temperature of Love	Nominated	
2019	StarHub Night of Stars 2019	Best Male Asian Star	Her Private Life	Won	
