= The Guest (South Korean TV series) =

2018 South Korean television series

- Promotional poster
- Hangul: 손 the guest
- Lit.: Hand the guest
- RR: Son the guest
- MR: Son the guest
- Genre: Supernatural; Horror; Thriller; Drama; Mystery
- Created by: Choi Jin-hee for Studio Dragon
- Written by: Kwon So-ra; Seo Jae-won
- Directed by: Kim Hong-seon
- Starring: Kim Dong-wook; Kim Jae-wook; Jung Eun-chae
- Composer: Kim Tae-seong
- Country of origin: South Korea
- Original language: Korean
- No. of episodes: 16

Production
- Executive producers: Choi Jin-hee; Kim Gun-hong
- Producer: Kim Ryun-hee
- Camera setup: Single-camera
- Running time: 60 minutes
- Production company: Studio Dragon

Original release
- Network: OCN
- Release: September 12 – November 1, 2018

The Guest (Korean: 손 the guest) is a 2018 South Korean television series about exorcism and shamanism that stars Kim Dong-wook, Kim Jae-wook, and Jung Eun-chae. It aired on OCN from September 12 to November 1, 2018, every Wednesday and Thursday at 23:00 (KST).

Despite not airing in prime time, the series received a peak rating of 4% nationwide.

== Plot ==
Yoon Hwa-pyung, the young son of a shaman family, is a psychic and can see ghosts. After a villager is possessed, he too is possessed by a powerful spirit called Park Il-do. His mother is then mysteriously killed and his grandmother commits suicide. Priest Yang and young priest-in-training Priest Choi arrive to perform an exorcism. Choi speaks with Hwa-pyung and is subsequently possessed, with the spirit leaving Hwa-pyung's body.

Priest Choi returns home and brutally murders his parents as his kid brother, Choi Yoon, hides. At the same time, Hwa-pyung runs away from home after his father tries to strangle him, blaming him for the family's deaths. He stops before Priest Choi's house, sensing an evil spirit inside. A policewoman and her daughter, Kang Gil-young, drive by and see Hwa-pyung; the policewoman investigates and saves Yoon before she is murdered by Priest Choi. Yoon joins the traumatized Gil-young and Hwa-pyung outside before the kids are separated by the police.

In 2018, 20 years after the incident, Hwa-pyung is now a taxi driver whose ultimate goal is to find Priest Choi in order to exorcise Park Il-do from his body. With his powers, he is able to see through the eyes of those possessed by Park Il-do and find out who they have killed, which results in his entanglement with Gil-Young, who followed her mother's footsteps and became a police detective. Yoon is now a priest, also determined to find his possessed brother. Unbeknownst to the three, they are the children from the incident, though they do not recognize each other now all these years later. As Hwa-pyung and Yoon reluctantly work together to expel demons, Gil-young works to bring justice to the victims, being skeptical of spirits.

== Cast ==
=== Main ===
- Kim Dong-wook as Yoon Hwa-pyung, a shaman who was born with psychic powers.
  - Choi Seung-hoon as young Yoon Hwa-pyung
- Kim Jae-wook as Choi Yoon / Matthew, a cynical and cold priest who alienates people but is recognized by his abilities as an exorcist.
  - Jung Yoo-geun as young Choi Yoon
- Jung Eun-chae as Kang Gil-young, a passionate and tough but easygoing detective who does not believe in the supernatural.
  - Kim Ji-young as young Kang Gil-young

=== Supporting ===
- Lee Won-jong as Yook Gwang
- Park Ho-san as Detective Ko Bong-sang, Gil-young's partner.
- Ahn Nae-sang as Priest Yang
- Yoon Jong-suk as Priest Choi Sang-hyun
- Jeon Bae-soo as Kim Young-soo
- Baek Bum-soo as Choi Min-goo
- Lee Joong-ok as Choi Min-sang
- Park Ji-a as Believer Kim
- Kim Hye-eun as Park Hong-joo
- Kim Shi-eun as Kim Ryoon-hee
- Shim Yi-young as Lee Hye-kyung
- Kim Hyung-min as Jung Hyun-soo
- Heo Yool as Jung Seo-yoon
- Lee Sang-hoon as Park Eui-won
- Kim Tae-hoon as Kang Jong-ryeol
- Ha Ji-eun as Han Mi-jin
- Han Kyu-won
- Kwon Ye-eun as Oh Cho-hee's daughter
- Kim Ji-won as Son Hyun-joo
- Yoo Seung-mok as Yoon Hwa-pyung's father

=== Special appearance ===
- Park Hyo-joo as Gil-young's mother
- Shim So-young as a possessed sushi place owner

== Original soundtrack ==
The Guest Original Soundtrack

Soundtrack album by Various Artists
- Recorded: 2018
- Genre: Soundtrack
- Languages: Korean; English
- Labels: Stone Music Entertainment; Pop Music; Genie Music

Part 1

Released on October 4, 2018
No.	Title	Lyrics	Music	Artist	Length
1.	"Somewhere"	Choi Jung-in (최정인)	Choi Jung-in (최정인)	O3ohn (오존)	02:55
2.	"Somewhere (Memory Ver.)"	Choi Jung-in (최정인)	Choi Jung-in (최정인)	Ha Jin (하진)	03:30
3.	"Somewhere" (Inst.)		Choi Jung-in (최정인)		02:55
4.	"Somewhere (Memory Ver.)" (Inst.)		Choi Jung-in (최정인)		03:30
Total length:					12:50

Part 2

Released on October 11, 2018
No.	Title	Lyrics	Music	Artist	Length
1.	"Bad Dream" (나쁜 꿈)	Yoon Young-joon	Yoon Young-joon	Son Seung-yeon	04:00
2.	"Bad Dream" (Inst.)	Yoon Young-joon	Yoon Young-joon		04:00
Total length:					8:00

== Viewership ==
The Guest : South Korea viewers per episode (thousands)

Season	Episode number																Average
Season	1	2	3	4	5	6	7	8	9	10	11	12	13	14	15	16	Average
1	386	732	664	833	736	809	859	750	719	723	703	865	912	928	888	1037	784

Source: Audience measurement performed nationwide by Nielsen Korea.

Average TV viewership ratings
Ep.	Original broadcast date	Average audience share			
Ep.	Original broadcast date	Nielsen Korea		TNmS	
Ep.	Original broadcast date	Nationwide	Seoul	Nationwide	Seoul
1	September 12, 2018	1.575% (5th)	1.846% (6th)	2.2% (4th)	N/A
2	September 13, 2018	2.902% (3rd)	3.488% (3rd)	N/A	N/A
3	September 19, 2018	2.572% (3rd)	2.857% (3rd)	2.7%	N/A
4	September 20, 2018	3.207% (3rd)	3.917% (3rd)	3.0%	N/A
5	September 26, 2018	2.899% (7th)	3.390% (7th)	3.6%	N/A
6	September 27, 2018	2.960% (3rd)	3.176% (3rd)	N/A	4.0%
7	October 3, 2018	3.025% (4th)	2.974% (5th)	4.0%	4.3%
8	October 4, 2018	3.151% (3rd)	3.339% (3rd)	3.9%	4.5%
9	October 10, 2018	2.887% (3rd)	3.534% (1st)	N/A	N/A
10	October 11, 2018	3.054% (2nd)	3.396% (3rd)	4.2%	N/A
11	October 17, 2018	2.616% (4th)	2.875% (4th)	4.4%	N/A
12	October 18, 2018	3.297% (2nd)	3.700% (2nd)	4.6%	5.0%
13	October 24, 2018	3.328% (2nd)	3.618% (2nd)	N/A	
14	October 25, 2018	3.378% (2nd)	3.498% (2nd)	5.0%	5.5%
15	October 31, 2018	3.399% (1st)	3.766% (1st)	N/A	
16	November 1, 2018	4.073% (2nd)	4.808% (2nd)	5.6%	6.3%
Average		3.020%	3.386%	— (Note: Due to some unpublished ratings, the exact average rating is unknown.)	—
In the table above, the blue numbers represent the lowest published ratings and the red numbers represent the highest published ratings.; N/A denotes that the rating is not known.; This series aired on a cable channel/pay TV which normally has a relatively smaller audience compared to free-to-air TV/public broadcasters (KBS, SBS, MBC and EBS).
