= What's Wrong with Secretary Kim =

2018 South Korean television series

- Promotional poster
- Also known as: What's Wrong, Secretary Kim
- Hangul: 김비서가 왜 그럴까
- RR: Gimbiseoga wae geureolkka
- MR: Kimbisŏga wae kŭrŏlkka
- Genre: Romantic comedy
- Based on: Why Secretary Kim by Jung Kyung-yoon
- Developed by: Studio Dragon
- Written by: Jung Eun-young
- Directed by: Park Joon-hwa
- Starring: Park Seo-joon; Park Min-young
- Country of origin: South Korea
- Original language: Korean
- No. of episodes: 16

Production
- Executive producers: Jang Jeong-do; Moon Suk-hwan; Oh Kwang-hee
- Producer: Lee Young-ok
- Camera setup: Single-camera
- Running time: 62–76 minutes
- Production company: Bon Factory Worldwide

Original release
- Network: tvN
- Release: June 6 – July 26, 2018

Related
- What's Wrong with Secretary Kim (Philippines); Dear My Secretary (Thailand); My Dear Secretary (China)

What's Wrong with Secretary Kim (Korean: 김비서가 왜 그럴까 / gimbiseoga wae geuleolkka) is a 2018 South Korean television series starring Park Seo-joon and Park Min-young. It is based on the novel of the same title by Jung Kyung-yoon which was first published in 2013, which was then serialized into a webtoon comic by KakaoPage in 2015. The series aired on tvN from June 6 to July 26, 2018, on Wednesdays and Thursdays for 16 episodes.

== Synopsis ==
Lee Young-joon (Park Seo-joon) is the vice-chairman of a major corporation. His world is shaken when, one day, his highly capable secretary, Kim Mi-so (Park Min-young), announces that she is resigning from her position after nine years. Young-joon decides to do whatever he can to persuade Mi-so to change her mind.

== Cast ==
=== Main ===
- Park Seo-joon as Lee Young-joon / Lee Sung-hyeon
  - Moon Woo-jin as 9-year-old Lee Sung-hyeon (Note: When Lee Young-joon was 9 years old, at the time he was kidnapped, his name was Lee Sung-hyeon. It was changed shortly after the kidnapping incident.)

Vice-chairman of Yumyung Group. He is handsome and capable, but his narcissism makes it difficult for Mi-so to work with him. He becomes aware of his feelings towards Mi-so after realizing that he might lose her. He can be jealous of Mi-so when she is with his brother or with someone other than him. At one point in his life, he suffered PTSD.

- Park Min-young as Kim Mi-so
  - Kim Ji-yoo as 5-year-old Kim Mi-so

A highly skilled secretary who has worked with Young-joon for nine years. She soon reciprocates Young-joon's feelings after realizing that he was a part of her childhood.

=== Supporting ===
Lee Young-joon's family

- Lee Tae-hwan as Lee Sung-yeon / Morpheus
  - Bae Gang-yoo as 11-year-old Lee Sung-yeon

Young-joon's older brother and a famous author. He had a crush on Mi-so.

- Kim Byeong-ok as Chairman Lee
  - Go Se-won as young Chairman Lee (Ep. 11–12)

Young-joon and Sung-yeon's father. Chairman of Yumyung Group.

- Kim Hye-ok as Madame Choi
  - Lee Soo-kyung as young Madame Choi (Ep. 11–12)

Young-joon and Sung-yeon's mother.

Kim Mi-so's family

- Baek Eun-hye as Kim Pil-nam

Mi-so's oldest sister who is a psychiatrist.

- Heo Sun-mi as Kim Mal-hee

Mi-so's second oldest sister who is a urologist.

- Jo Deok-hyun as Kim Young-man

Mi-so's father who is a rock musician.

Yumyung Group

- Kang Ki-young as Park Yoo-sik

President of Yumyung Group, the second-in-command after the vice-chairman. Young-joon's best friend back from university. He is Young-joon's confidant and provides him with much advice drawn from personal experience. He is still in love with his ex-wife.

- Hwang Chan-sung as Go Gwi-nam

A deputy in Yumyung Group who later transfers to Chi-in's group. He is known for his handsome looks, elite education, being a workaholic, and extreme frugality.

- Pyo Ye-jin as Kim Ji-a

The rookie secretary to the vice-chairman, being groomed to replace Mi-so who has announced her resignation.

- Kim Ye-won as Sul Ma-eum

Yoo-sik's secretary who is clumsy and careless, often comparing unfavorably to Mi-so.

- Hwang Bo-ra as Bong Se-ra

A section head in Chi-in's team, who initially coveted the open position of secretary to the vice-chairman, and initially had a crush on Gwi-nam.

- Lee Yoo-joon as Jung Chi-in

A team leader in the vice-chairman's office, who frequently organizes after-work gatherings.

- Lee Jung-min as Lee Young-ok

A member of Chi-in's team, who has a strict adherence to dieting.

- Kim Jung-woon as Park Joon-hwan

A member of Chi-in's team, who is bespectacled and brags about his university education.

- Kang Hong-seok as Yang Cheol

A secretary and chauffeur to the vice-chairman, he is a man of few words. He ends up bailing out Se-ra several times.

- Bae Hyun-sung as Bae Yun-sung, an intern staff.

=== Special appearances ===
- Hong Ji-yoon as Oh Ji-ran, a famous model and onetime girlfriend of Young-joon (Ep. 1-3 & 16)
- Choi Na-mu as woman at the Spanish Embassy party (Ep. 1)
- Shin Joo-yeon as Kim Mi-so's friend (Ep. 1)
- Park Byung-eun as Park Byung-eun, Kim Mi-so's blind date (Ep. 3)
- Lee Do-yeon as a reporter who interviewed Morpheus (Ep. 4)
- Lee Chang as center director of the Art Center (Ep. 4)
- Choi Hee as the host of the book concert (Ep. 8)
- Jung Soo-young as an agency staff (Ep. 9)
- Mihal Ashminov as a chef at a restaurant (Ep. 9)
- Seo Hyo-rim as Choi Seo-jin, Park Yoo-sik's ex-wife (Ep. 9, 11–12 & 16)
- Lee Min-ki as young Mi-so's father (Ep. 10) (Note: The character appears in a short crossover scene, alluding Director Park Joon-hwa's previous work Because This Is My First Life (2017) where the character originally appears.)
- Jung So-min as young Mi-so's mother (Ep. 10)
- Choi Hyun-woo as Magician (Ep. 10)
- Son Seong-yoon as the kidnapper (Ep. 11–12)
- Gil Hae-yeon as the woman at the reserved parking space (Ep. 12)
- Jung Woo-suk as Psychiatrist (Ep. 12)
- Park Na-rae as the lewd devil (voice) (Ep. 13)
- Jung Yu-mi as Jung Yu-mi, a childhood friend and former classmate of Lee Young-joon (Ep. 14)
- Kim Ga-yeon and Lee Se-young as the staff who talked behind Kim Mi-so's back (Ep. 14)
- Lee Byung-joon as a wedding dress designer (Ep. 16)

== Production ==
=== Development ===
Much of the visual styling of the series protagonists have referenced the comic version's cues, including clothing designs and reenacting the comic cover for the drama's promotional stills and images.

The first script reading was held on April 10, 2018, at Studio Dragon in Sangam-dong, Seoul, South Korea.

Maserati Korea provided the cars of Lee Young-joon, Lee Sung-yeon and Yumyong Group. The cars featured in the show include a Maserati Ghibli (driven by Yoo-sik), a Maserati Levante (driven by Sung-yeon), a Maserati GranCabrio (driven by Young-joon), and a Maserati Quattroporte (driven by Young-joon).

=== Promotion ===
The press conference for the drama was held on May 30, 2018, at the Times Square in Seoul with the attendance of the main cast and crew.

== Original soundtrack ==
What's Wrong with Secretary Kim OST

Soundtrack album by Various artists
- Released: 2018
- Genre: Soundtrack
- Languages: Korean; English
- Labels: Bon Factory Worldwide, kakao M
- Producers: Moon Seok-hwan, Oh Kwang-hee

=== Part 1 ===
Released on June 14, 2018
No.	Title	Lyrics	Music	Artist	Length
1.	"Love Virus"	ZigZag Note, Kim Myeong-shin	ZigZag Note, Kim Myeong-shin	Kihyun (Monsta X), SeolA (Cosmic Girls)	03:27
2.	"Love Virus (Inst.)"		ZigZag Note, Kim Myeong-shin		03:27
Total length:					06:54

=== Part 2 ===
Released on June 20, 2018
No.	Title	Lyrics	Music	Artist	Length
1.	"It's You"	Good Choice, Yoda	Kim Se-jin, Midnight	Jeong Se-woon	03:39
2.	"It's You (Inst.)"		Kim Se-jin, Midnight		03:39
Total length:					07:18

=== Part 3 ===
Released on June 21, 2018
No.	Title	Lyrics	Music	Artist	Length
1.	"Wanna Be"	ZigZag Note	ZigZag Note	GFriend	03:09
2.	"Wanna Be (Inst.)"		ZigZag Note		03:09
Total length:					06:18

=== Part 4 ===
Released on June 27, 2018
No.	Title	Lyrics	Music	Artist	Length
1.	"Just A Little Bit More" (조금만 더)	ZigZag Note, Kim Young-sung, Good Choice	ZigZag Note, Kim Young-sung	Jinho (Pentagon), Rothy	03:25
2.	"Just A Little Bit More (Inst.)" (조금만 더 (Inst.))		ZigZag Note, Kim Young-sung		03:25
Total length:					06:50

=== Part 5 ===
Released on June 28, 2018
No.	Title	Lyrics	Music	Artist	Length
1.	"Because I Only See You" (그대만 보여서)	Good Choice, Red Socks	Red Socks	Kim Na-young	03:40
2.	"Because I Only See You (Inst.)" (그대만 보여서 (Inst.))		Red Socks		03:40
Total length:					07:20

=== Part 6 ===
Released on July 4, 2018
No.	Title	Lyrics	Music	Artist	Length
1.	"Why Am I Like This" (왜 이럴까)	Moon Sung-nam, Im Joo-yeon	Moon Sung-nam, Im Joo-yeon	Lee Da-yeon	02:40
2.	"Why Am I Like This (Inst.)" (왜 이럴까 (Inst.))		Moon Sung-nam, Im Joo-yeon		02:40
Total length:					05:20

=== Part 7 ===
Released on July 5, 2018
No.	Title	Lyrics	Music	Artist	Length
1.	"In The End" (토로)	Kang Myeong-shin, ZigZag Note, Noh Eun-jong	ZigZag Note, Noh Eun-jong	Yun Ddan Ddan	04:25
2.	"In The End (Inst.)" (토로 (Inst.))		ZigZag Note, Noh Eun-jong		04:25
Total length:					08:50

=== Part 8 ===
Released on July 12, 2018
No.	Title	Lyrics	Music	Artist	Length
1.	"Words Being Said For The First Time" (처음 하는 말)	Good Choice	Kim Se-jin, Midnight	Song Yuvin (Myteen)	03:56
2.	"Words Being Said For The First Time (Inst.)" (처음 하는 말 (Inst.))		Kim Se-jin, Midnight		03:56
Total length:					07:52

Disc 2:
No.	Title	Artist	Length
1.	"Secretary (Opening Theme)"	Various Artists	1:49
2.	"Alsong Big Band"	Various Artists	1:53
3.	"Art of Love"	Various Artists	3:02
4.	"Baby Elephant"	Various Artists	2:17
5.	"Big Bean"	Various Artists	2:28
6.	"Edge"	Various Artists	2:08
7.	"Funny Sunny"	Various Artists	1:26
8.	"Gaint Food"	Various Artists	1:43
9.	"Groove Company"	Various Artists	1:21
10.	"Kim Possible"	Various Artists	1:47
11.	"Lonely Boss"	Various Artists	1:59
12.	"Lovely Girl"	Various Artists	1:31
13.	"Loving You"	Various Artists	3:19
14.	"Mad Walk"	Various Artists	2:43
15.	"Man in Black"	Various Artists	2:43
16.	"New Recruit"	Various Artists	1:48
17.	"Nothing to Lose"	Various Artists	3:02
18.	"Old Story"	Various Artists	2:40
19.	"Pacific"	Various Artists	1:58
20.	"Squeeze"	Various Artists	1:29
21.	"Tambara"	Various Artists	1:46
22.	"Think Srtings"	Various Artists	3:04
23.	"Tempest"	Various Artists	2:36
24.	"Why Brass Mind"	Various Artists	3:32
25.	"Why Chomic Lim"	Various Artists	2:40
26.	"Why Slow Piano Mode"	Various Artists	3:21
Total length:			58:05

== Viewership ==
What's Wrong with Secretary Kim : South Korea viewers per episode (millions)

Season	Episode number																Average
Season	1	2	3	4	5	6	7	8	9	10	11	12	13	14	15	16	Average
1	1.510	1.480	2.002	1.727	1.783	1.897	1.926	2.058	2.002	2.231	2.383	2.348	2.094	2.234	2.014	2.348	2.002

Source: Audience measurement performed nationwide by Nielsen Media Research.

Average TV viewership ratings
Ep.	Original broadcast date	Title	Average audience share		
Ep.	Original broadcast date	Title	Nielsen Korea		TNmS
Ep.	Original broadcast date	Title	Nationwide	Seoul	Nationwide
1	June 6, 2018	I Want to Pick Up My Life Now	5.757%	6.446%	6.3%
2	June 7, 2018	She Just Doesn't Want to Get Married	5.403%	5.529%	5.6%
3	June 13, 2018	Go on a Date	6.950%	8.252%	8.3%
4	June 14, 2018	I Come Back to Forgive You	6.379%	6.945%	6.3%
5	June 20, 2018	Ordinary Relationships	6.855%	7.500%	7.0%
6	June 21, 2018	What's Wrong with Vice Chairman Lee?	7.687%	8.554%	7.7%
7	June 27, 2018	Memories Should Stay Buried	7.281%	8.201%	8.5%
8	June 28, 2018	I Like You Too	8.120%	9.326%	8.3%
9	July 4, 2018	Let's Make it Official	7.767%	9.428%	8.8%
10	July 5, 2018	It Was You All Along	8.403%	9.545%	9.2%
11	July 11, 2018	Why Hold Back the Truth?	8.665%	10.565%	10.6%
12	July 12, 2018	I Don't Want to Waste Away Tonight	8.393%	10.052%	9.7%
13	July 18, 2018	Nothing Can Stop Us	7.673%	8.717%	8.7%
14	July 19, 2018	I Will Always Stay with You	8.100%	9.506%	9.2%
15	July 25, 2018	Wedding Bells	7.107%	7.725%	8.0%
16	July 26, 2018	What's Wrong with You, Kim Mi So?	8.602%	10.001%	9.8%
Average			7.446%	8.518%	8.3%
In the table above, the blue numbers represent the lowest ratings and the red numbers represent the highest ratings.; This drama aired on a cable channel/pay TV which normally has a relatively smaller audience compared to free-to-air TV/public broadcasters (KBS, SBS, MBC and EBS).

== Awards and nominations ==
Year	Award	Category	Recipient	Result	Ref.
2018	11th Korea Drama Awards	Top Excellence Award, Actor	Park Seo-joon	Nominated	
2018	11th Korea Drama Awards	Excellence Award, Actor	Hwang Chan-sung	Won	
2018	11th Korea Drama Awards	Hallyu Star Award	Hwang Chan-sung	Won	
2018	11th Korea Drama Awards	Popular Character Award – Female	Pyo Ye-jin	Won	
2018	11th Korea Drama Awards	Best Original Soundtrack	"Because I Only See You" (Kim Na-young)	Nominated	
2018	6th APAN Star Awards	Top Excellence Award, Actor in a Miniseries	Park Seo-joon	Won	
2018	6th APAN Star Awards	Excellence Award, Actress in a Miniseries	Park Min-young	Nominated	
2018	6th APAN Star Awards	K-Star Award, Actor	Park Seo-joon	Nominated	
2018	6th APAN Star Awards	K-Star Award, Actress	Park Min-young	Won	
2019	14th Annual Soompi Awards	Best Actress of the Year	Park Min-young	Won	
2019	14th Annual Soompi Awards	Best Actor of the Year	Park Seo-joon	Nominated	
2019	14th Annual Soompi Awards	Best Couple	Park Seo-joon and Park Min-young	Nominated	

== Adaptations ==
In November 2023, ABS-CBN announced a Philippine remake for the series. It premiered on March 18, 2024 on Viu.

Thailand will produce an adaptation of the series titled Dear My Secretary and is set to premiere in 2025.

China will have its own adaptation title My Dear Secretary and will release in 2025.

Indonesia also produced its own adaptation titled What's Up With Secretary Kim, released as a film on November 8, 2025.

Sri Lanka also produced its own adaptation titled පියවදනී - Piyawadani(TV series) , The girl who speaks sweet words , released on 10th April 2023 on TV Derana ( Sri Lankan Chanel)

Hong Kong will produce its own adaptation and is set to release on January 28, 2027 on ViuTV.
