= Crazy Love (2022 TV series) =

2022 South Korean television series

- Promotional poster
- Hangul: 크레이지 러브
- RR: Keureiji reobeu
- MR: K'ŭreiji rŏbŭ
- Genre: Romantic comedy
- Written by: Kim Bo-gyeom
- Directed by: Kim Jung-hyun
- Starring: Kim Jae-wook; Krystal Jung; Ha Jun
- Music by: Jeong Seung-hyun
- Country of origin: South Korea
- Original language: Korean
- No. of episodes: 16

Production
- Executive producers: Kim Bo-yeon; Kim Shin-ah
- Producers: Kang Bo-young; Han Hee-yoon
- Running time: 70 minutes
- Production companies: Arc Media; Slingshot Studios

Original release
- Network: KBS2
- Release: March 7 – April 26, 2022

Crazy Love (Korean: 크레이지 러브) is a South Korean television series starring Kim Jae-wook, Krystal Jung, and Ha Jun. It aired on KBS2 from March 7 to April 26, 2022, every Monday and Tuesday at 21:30 (KST). Initially scheduled to be released as one of iQiYi's originals, the series was instead streamed on Disney+ in selected regions.

== Synopsis ==
Noh Go-jin (Kim Jae-wook), the CEO of GOTOP — South Korea's top teaching institute — pretends to have amnesia after being injured in a car accident. Lee Shin-ah (Krystal Jung), Go-jin's introverted and quiet secretary, has been diagnosed with terminal brain cancer. Believing that Go-jin has amnesia, Shin-ah pretends to be his fiancé.

== Cast ==
=== Main ===
- Kim Jae-wook as Noh Go-jin, genius math instructor and CEO of GOTOP Education who pretends to have amnesia after being involved in a car accident.
- Krystal Jung as Lee Shin-ah, Go-jin's secretary who has been diagnosed with cancer following months of headaches which she attributes to her stressful job. She has held the position as Go-jin's secretary for a year despite all of her predecessors quitting the position within 3 months. However her dream is to become an instructor for Korean.
- Ha Jun as Oh Se-gi, vice president of GOTOP Education who is the only person that can comfort Go-jin. However, it turns out that he holds Go-jin responsible for his sister's suicide.

=== Supporting ===
==== People related to GOTOP ====
- Kim Ki-nam as Gong Hee-cheol
- Baek Joo-hee as Chief Ma
- Lee Ji-min as Michelle Lee, a unique English teacher who was scouted by Noh Go-jin for a penalty.
- Lee Si-eon as Kang Min, a former English teacher who was kicked out by Noh Go-jin.
- Jo In as Kim Hye-sun, Noh Go-jin's former secretary.
- Moon Do-yoon as Lee So-ra, Noh Go-jin's former secretary who resigned after three months due to Noh Go-jin's strict temperament beyond meticulousness.
- Lee Mi-young as a cleaning employee
- Lee Yoon-hee as a security guard
- Jung Sung-ho as Kim Cha-bae

==== People around Lee Shin-ah ====
- Park Han-sol as Choo Ok-hee, Lee Shin-ah's close friend who lives with her. Ok-hee has a career as a stage actor. She is a true friend that Shin-ah can rely on. During the day, she works part-time as a secretary at a lawyer's office and goes to auditions all the time.
- Yoon San-ha as Lee Su-ho, Lee Shin-ah's brother and Chu Ok-hee's boyfriend.
- Kim Hak-sun as Lee Yong-gu, Lee Shin-ah's father.

==== Others ====
- Im Won-hee as Park Tae-yang, representative of Mirae Edu.
- Yoo In-young as Baek Soo-young, Noh Go-jin's ex-girlfriend who broke up with him to save him from her father.
- Ko Kyu-pil as Joo Jun-pal, a solver of the Heungshinso who is called detective Zhull.
- Lee Ha-jin
- Seo Ji-hoo as Baek Soo-young's loyal secretary

=== Special appearance ===
- Tae In-ho as a reporter
- Yoon Sa-bong as Hong Yeo-sa

Park Tae-yang's wife

- Jung Shin-hye as Oh Se-hee, Oh Se-gi's sister

== Original soundtrack ==
=== Part 1 ===
Released on March 7, 2022
No.	Title	Lyrics	Music	Artist	Length
1.	"I'm Crazy"	Kim Ho-kyung	Jeong Seung-hyun; Park Tae-hyun	Lee Dae-hwi (AB6IX); Jeon Woong (AB6IX)	3:29
2.	"I'm Crazy" (Inst.)		Jeong Seung-hyun; Park Tae-hyun		3:29
Total length:					6:58

=== Part 2 ===
Released on March 15, 2022
No.	Title	Lyrics	Music	Artist	Length
1.	"Stay Alive"	Rang	Lee Hae Sol; Rang	Fromis 9	3:35
2.	"Stay Alive" (Inst.)		Lee Hae Sol; Rang		3:35
Total length:					7:10

=== Part 3 ===
Released on March 21, 2022
No.	Title	Lyrics	Music	Artist	Length
1.	"Bite!" (물어!)	Jeon-ni; Nmore; Jozu	Jeon-ni; Nmore; Jozu	Baekho	3:18
2.	"Bite!" (물어!; Inst.)		Jeon-ni; Nmore; Jozu		3:18
Total length:					6:36

=== Part 4 ===
Released on March 29, 2022
No.	Title	Lyrics	Music	Artist	Length
1.	"Dive Into You"	Midnight	Midnight; TM	Jay B	3:26
2.	"Dive Into You" (Inst.)		Midnight; TM		3:26
Total length:					6:52

=== Part 5 ===
Released on April 4, 2022
No.	Title	Lyrics	Music	Artist	Length
1.	"Maybe"	Kim Beom-ju; Kim Si-hyuk; Nam Ki-moon	Kim Beom-ju; Kim Si-hyuk; Nam Ki-moon	Davii	3:07
2.	"Maybe" (Inst.)		Kim Beom-ju; Kim Si-hyuk; Nam Ki-moon		3:07
Total length:					6:14

=== Part 6 ===
Released on April 12, 2022
No.	Title	Lyrics	Music	Artist	Length
1.	"Wide Open"	Juniel	Seo Eui-seong; Mats Tärnfors; Linnea Gawell	Juniel	3:02
2.	"Wide Open" (Inst.)		Seo Eui-seong; Mats Tärnfors; Linnea Gawell		3:02
Total length:					6:04

== Viewership ==
Crazy Love : South Korea viewers per episode (thousands)

Season	Episode number																Average
Season	1	2	3	4	5	6	7	8	9	10	11	12	13	14	15	16	Average
1	N/A	N/A	N/A	N/A	N/A	N/A	N/A	N/A	N/A	N/A	671	639	N/A	728	697	741	N/A

Source: Audience measurement performed nationwide by Nielsen Korea.

Average TV viewership ratings
Ep.	Original broadcast date	Average audience share (Nielsen Korea)	
Ep.	Original broadcast date	Nationwide	Seoul
1	March 7, 2022	3.4% (25th)	—N/a
2	March 8, 2022	2.4% (36th)	—N/a
3	March 14, 2022	1.9% (40th)	—N/a
4	March 15, 2022	2.3% (34th)	—N/a
5	March 21, 2022	2.1% (35th)	—N/a
6	March 22, 2022	2.5% (30th)	—N/a
7	March 28, 2022	2.5% (29th)	—N/a
8	March 29, 2022	2.6% (28th)	—N/a
9	April 4, 2022	2.6% (30th)	—N/a
10	April 5, 2022	3.0% (24th)	—N/a
11	April 11, 2022	4.3% (16th)	4.1% (17th)
12	April 12, 2022	4.0% (20th)	3.8% (19th)
13	April 18, 2022	3.8% (21st)	3.7% (18th)
14	April 19, 2022	4.4% (15th)	4.2% (16th)
15	April 25, 2022	4.3% (16th)	4.1% (18th)
16	April 26, 2022	4.6% (12th)	4.3% (14th)
Average		3.2%	—
In the table above, the blue numbers represent the lowest ratings and the red numbers represent the highest ratings.; N/A denotes ratings that were not released.
