= Park Min-young =

South Korean actress (born 1986)

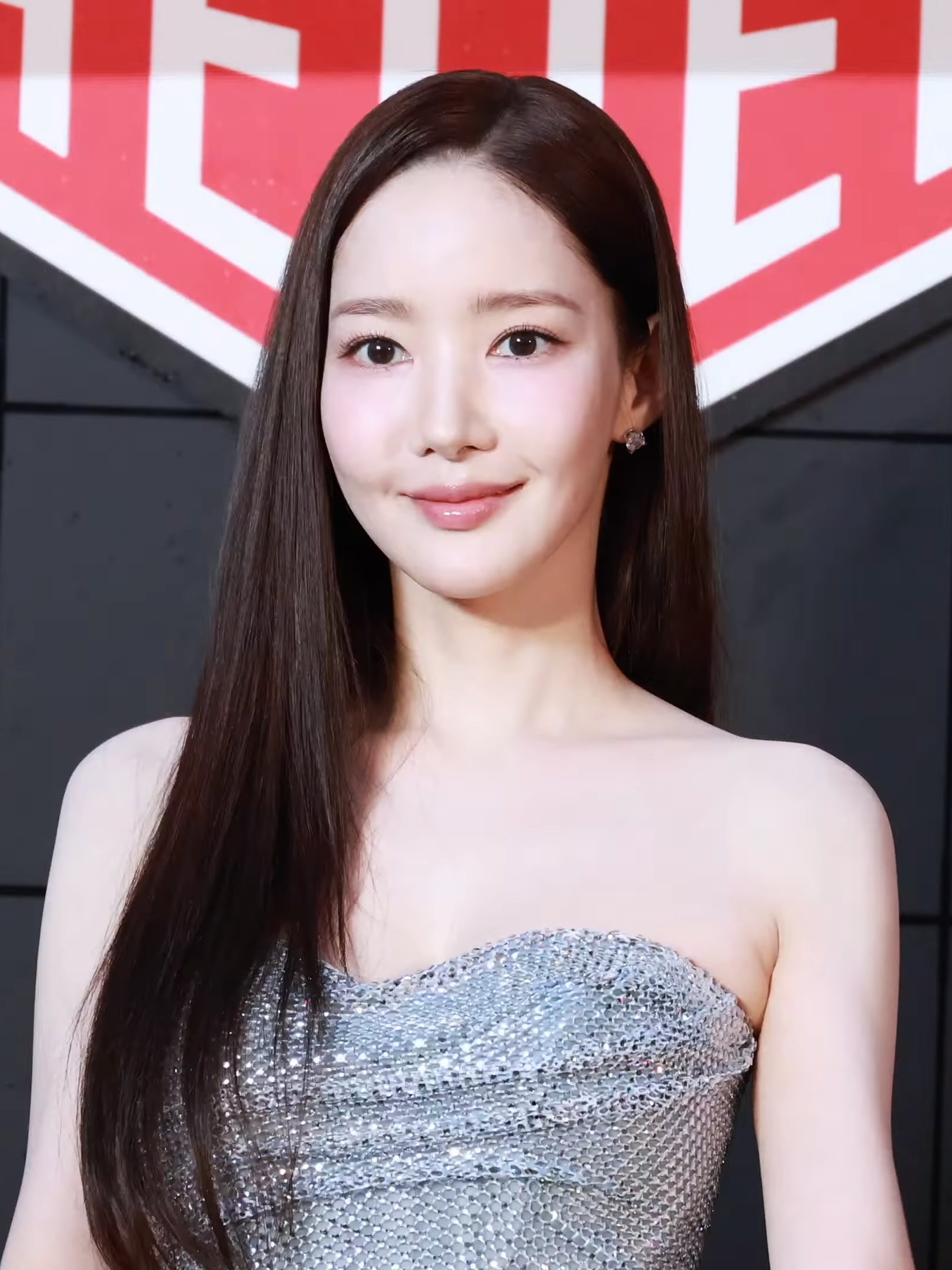
- Park in June 2025
- Born: March 4, 1986 (age 40); Seoul, South Korea
- Other name: Rachel Park
- Education: Dongguk University (BA)
- Occupation: Actress
- Years active: 2005–present
- Agent: Dareum Entertainment

Korean name
- Hangul: 박민영
- RR: Bak Minyeong
- MR: Pak Minyŏng

Signature
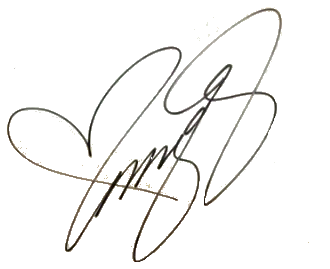

Park Min-young (Korean: 박민영; born March 4, 1986), also known as Rachel Park, is a South Korean actress. She rose to fame in the historical coming-of-age drama Sungkyunkwan Scandal (2010) and has since starred in television series City Hunter (2011), Glory Jane (2011), Healer (2014–2015), Remember (2015–2016), What's Wrong with Secretary Kim (2018), Her Private Life (2019), Forecasting Love and Weather (2022), and Marry My Husband (2024).

== Early life and education ==
During her time in high school, Park studied abroad in the United States as an international exchange student.

In February 2013, Park graduated from Dongguk University in Seoul with a degree in Theatre.

== Career ==
=== 2005–2009: Early career ===
Park made her entertainment debut in a SK Telecom commercial in 2005. She launched her acting career a year later in the hit sitcom High Kick! (2006). She continued to appear in television dramas, in roles such as the only daughter of a notorious gangster in I Am Sam (2007) and a gumiho (nine-tailed fox in Korean mythology) in an episode of horror-themed drama Hometown of Legends (2008). She played a villainous princess in the period drama Ja Myung Go (2009) and a girl caught between two marathon runners in Running, Gu (2010).

In 2008, Park was featured in BigBang's hit song Haru Haru where she played the girlfriend of G-Dragon.

=== 2010–2011: Breakthrough ===
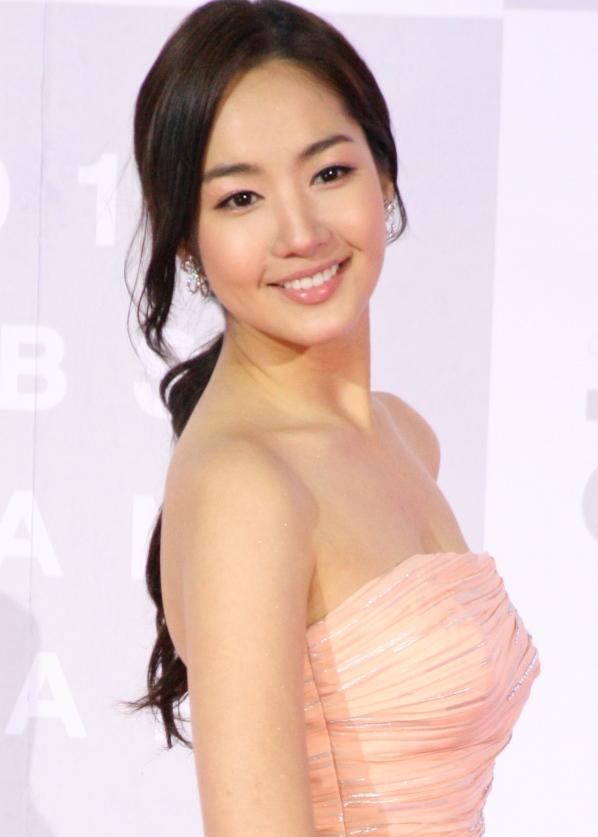
Park at the 2010 KBS Drama Awards

Park's breakthrough came with the 2010 drama Sungkyunkwan Scandal, a coming-of-age drama in which her character, an intelligent and resourceful young woman, disguises herself as a boy in order to enter the most prestigious learning institution in Joseon. This was followed in 2011 by another success with City Hunter, based on the titular Japanese manga. Park starred opposite Lee Min-ho in a story about a vigilante out for revenge and justice, and the secret service agent he falls for. Park's success on the small screen resulted in increased advertising offers for the actress.

Later that year, she made her big screen debut in the horror film The Cat, about a woman who becomes consumed by fear after she adopts a cat found at the site of a mysterious death. Park next appeared in the melodrama Glory Jane, in the role of a nurse's aide who becomes involved with a former baseball player (played by Chun Jung-myung).

=== 2012–present: Leading roles ===
Park starred in another manga screen adaptation in 2012; in Dr. Jin, a neurosurgeon (played by Song Seung-heon) travels back in time to 1860. Park played dual roles as the protagonist's girlfriend in the present-day (a comatose doctor), and her doppelgänger in the Joseon era (a sheltered noblewoman).

In May 2013, Park Min Young ended her contract with the previous management company King Kong Entertainment and was a free agent for six months. In November 2013, Park signed with new management agency Culture Depot.

She next played an idealistic intern in the legal drama A New Leaf (2014), who clashes with her brilliant but cynical lawyer boss until he becomes an amnesiac (played by Kim Myung-min). This was followed by a role as a tabloid reporter in Healer, a series written by Song Ji-na that also starred Ji Chang-wook and Yoo Ji-tae. Healer was popular in China and resulted in increased recognition for Park.

Park next starred as a lawyer in the Korean drama Remember on SBS from late 2015 to early 2016, and played a Queen in the historical drama, Queen for Seven Days, which aired in 2017. In September 2017, It was confirmed that Park will be a fixed cast member in Netflix's variety show Busted!. In November 2017, it was reported that Park Min Young's contract with her agency Culture Depot expired. In December 2017, Park signed with new management agency Namoo Actors.

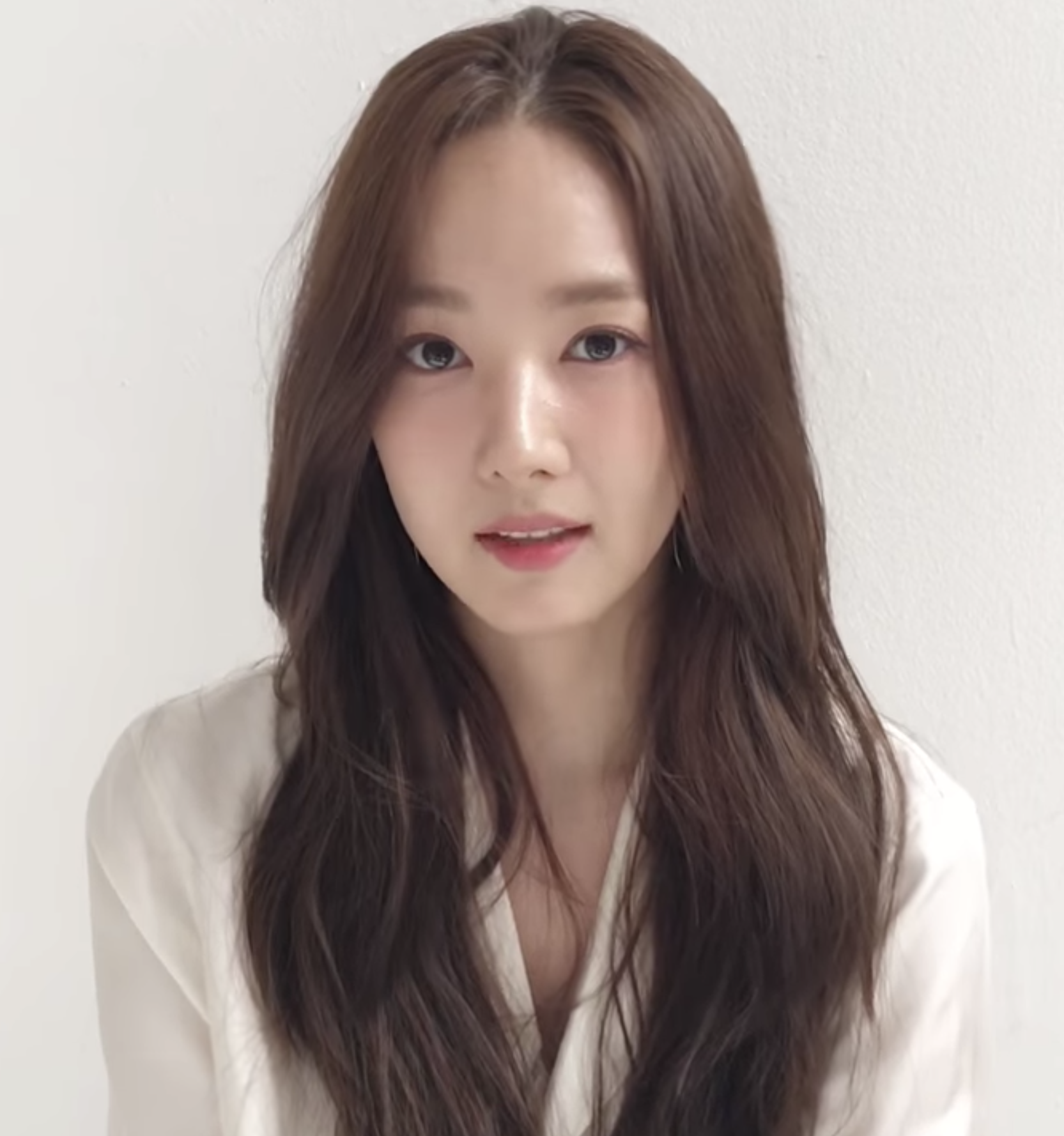
Park in 2018

In 2018, Park was cast in her first romantic comedy drama What's Wrong with Secretary Kim alongside Park Seo-joon. The series was a ratings success, leading to increased popularity for Park. In October, Park held her first fan meeting since her debut 12 years ago titled My Day.

In 2019, Park starred in her second romantic comedy drama Her Private Life alongside Kim Jae-wook. Park played Seong Deok-mi who works as a curator at an art museum but spends her time outside of work as a passionate fangirl of idol groups.

In 2020, she starred in the JTBC romance drama When the Weather Is Fine alongside Seo Kang-joon.

On December 29, 2021, Namoo Actors announced that Park's contract had expired after she decided not to renew it. A day later, Hook Entertainment announced that Park has signed an exclusive contract.

In 2022, Park starred in the JTBC romance drama Forecasting Love and Weather alongside Song Kang, playing Jin Ha-kyung – a general forecaster at Korea Meteorological Administration.

In January 2024, Park appeared as the female lead in the fantasy revenge melodrama Marry My Husband alongside Na In-woo (as Yoo Ji-hyuk), where she portrayed Kang Ji-won, an assistant manager who spends her days burdened by an incompetent husband, neglectful in-laws, and a hard work life, and becomes a cancer patient at a young age. She gets her revenge with the assistance of Yoo Ji-hyuk.

In January 2025, Park departed from Hook Entertainment after her contract expired and joined Dareum Entertainment.

Park then starred in TV Chosun's crime-comedy series Confidence Queen, the Korean remake of The Confidence Man JP, where she played a genius con artist. It was the first so-called first Korean Amazon Original Drama which streams exclusively on Prime Video globally and Coupang Play in South Korea on September 6, 2025. She is starring in TvN's Siren's Kiss based on the 1999 Japanese television series Koori no Sekai by Hisashi Nozawa, in which she will play a high-profile art auctioneer who becomes the center of a criminal investigation.

== Public image ==
Park Min-young has been widely regarded as one of South Korea's most beloved and respected actresses. In the media, Park has been synonymous as the "Queen of Rom-coms."

Park rose to prominence as a fashion icon following her role as Kim Mi-so in What's Wrong with Secretary Kim back in 2018, where her polished office looks sparked fashion trends among women in their 20s and 30s.

== Other activities ==
=== Philanthropy ===
On March 7, 2022, Park donated ₩100 million to the Hope Bridge Disaster Relief Association to help the victims of the Uljin forest fire 2022, that started in Uljin and has spread to Samcheok, Gangwon.

On February 8, 2024, Park donated ₩100 million to the Seoul Asan Medical Center Cancer Center to help cancer patients.

== Filmography ==
=== Film ===
Key
| † | Denotes films that have not yet been released |

| Year | Title | Role | Ref. |
|---|---|---|---|
| 2011 | The Cat | So-yeon | |

=== Television series ===
Key
| † | Denotes television productions that have not yet been released |

| Year | Title | Role | Notes | Ref. |
|---|---|---|---|---|
| 2006–2007 | High Kick! | Kang Yoo-mi | | |
| 2007 | I Am Sam | Yoo Eun-byul | | |
| 2008 | Hometown of Legends | Lee Myung-ok | | |
| 2009 | Ja Myung Go | Princess Ra-hee | | |
| 2010 | Running, Gu | Moon Haeng-joo | | |
| 2010 | Sungkyunkwan Scandal | Kim Yoon-hee / Kim Yoon-shik | | |
| 2011 | City Hunter | Kim Na-na | | |
| 2011 | Glory Jane | Yoon Jae-in | | |
| 2012 | Dr. Jin | Yoo Mi-na / Hong Young-rae | | |
| 2014 | A New Leaf | Lee Ji-yoon | | |
| 2014–2015 | Healer | Chae Young-shin / Oh Ji-an | | |
| 2015–2016 | Remember | Lee In-a | | |
| 2017 | Queen for Seven Days | Shin Chae-kyung | | |
| 2018 | What's Wrong with Secretary Kim | Kim Mi-so | | |
| 2019 | Her Private Life | Sung Duk-mi | | |
| 2020 | When the Weather Is Fine | Mok Hae-won | | |
| 2022 | Forecasting Love and Weather | Jin Ha-kyung | | |
| 2022 | Love in Contract | Choi Sang-eun | | |
| 2023–2024 | Castle in the Time | Xu Zhen | Chinese drama | |
| 2024 | Marry My Husband | Kang Ji-won | | |
| 2024 | Braveness of the Ming | Xie Yu Fei | Chinese drama | |
| 2025 | Confidence Queen | Yoon Yi-rang | | |
| 2026 | Siren's Kiss | Han Seol-ah | | |
| 2025–2027 | Nine to Six † | Kang Yi-ji | | |

=== Hosting ===
| Year | Title | Notes | Ref. |
|---|---|---|---|
| 2014 | 2014 KBS Drama Awards | with Kim Sang-kyung and Seo In-guk | |
| 2019 | 33rd Golden Disc Awards | With Lee Seung-gi | |

=== Television shows ===
| Year | Title | Role | Notes | Ref. |
|---|---|---|---|---|
| 2025 | Perfect Glow | Host | | |

=== Web shows ===
| Year | Title | Role | Notes | Ref. |
|---|---|---|---|---|
| 2018–21 | Busted! | Cast member | Season 1–3 | |

=== Music video appearances ===
| Year | Song title | Artist | Ref. |
|---|---|---|---|
| 2007 | "Don't Say Goodbye" | Kim Young-jin (I) | |
| 2008 | "Haru Haru" | BigBang | |
| 2009 | "Love Story" | Gavy NJ | |

== Accolades ==
=== Awards and nominations ===
Name of the award ceremony, year presented, category, nominee of the award, and the result of the nomination
| Award ceremony | Year | Category | Nominee / work | Result | Ref. |
|---|---|---|---|---|---|
| APAN Star Awards | 2018 | Excellence Award, Actress in a Miniseries | What's Wrong with Secretary Kim | Nominated | |
| APAN Star Awards | 2018 | K-Star Popular Actress Award | What's Wrong with Secretary Kim | Won | |
| Asia Artist Awards | 2017 | Best Celebrity Award | Queen for Seven Days | Won | |
| Asia Artist Awards | 2019 | Asia Celebrity Award, Actress | Park Min-young | Won | |
| Asia Artist Awards | 2019 | Best Artist Award, Actress | Park Min-young | Won | |
| Asia Artist Awards | 2022 | Best Artist Award, Actress | Park Min-young | Won | |
| Asia Artist Awards | 2022 | Hot Trend Award – Actress | Park Min-young | Won | |
| Asia Artist Awards | 2024 | Best Actress of the Year (Daesang) | Park Min-young | Won | |
| Asia Artist Awards | 2024 | Best Artist Award, Actress | Park Min-young | Won | |
| Asia Drama Conference | 2018 | Special Recognition Award | What's Wrong with Secretary Kim | Won | |
| Asia Model Awards | 2008 | Model Award | Park Min-young | Won | |
| Asia Model Awards | 2015 | Asia Special Award, Actress | Park Min-young | Won | |
| Baeksang Arts Awards | 2008 | Best New Actress (TV) | I Am Sam | Nominated | |
| Baeksang Arts Awards | 2011 | Best Actress (TV) | Sungkyunkwan Scandal | Nominated | |
| Cosmo Beauty Awards | 2018 | Annual Shining Beauty Idol | Park Min-young | Won | |
| DramaFever Awards | 2016 | Best Couple | Park Min-young (with Ji Chang-wook); Healer | Won | |
| iQiYi Taiwan Entertainment Awards | 2019 | Most Beautiful Award | What's Wrong with Secretary Kim | Won | |
| KBS Drama Awards | 2007 | Best New Actress | I Am Sam | Won | |
| KBS Drama Awards | 2008 | Excellence Award, Actress in a Special/One Act Drama | Hometown of Legends: Gumiho | Won | |
| KBS Drama Awards | 2010 | Excellence Award, Actress in a Mid-length Drama | Sungkyunkwan Scandal | Won | |
| KBS Drama Awards | 2010 | Netizen's Award | Sungkyunkwan Scandal | Won | |
| KBS Drama Awards | 2010 | Best Couple Award | Park Min-young (with Park Yoo-chun); Sungkyunkwan Scandal | Won | |
| KBS Drama Awards | 2011 | Top Excellence Actress | Glory Jane | Nominated | |
| KBS Drama Awards | 2011 | Excellence Award, Actress in a Mid-length Drama | Glory Jane | Won | |
| KBS Drama Awards | 2014 | Excellence Award, Actress in a Mid-length Drama | Healer | Won | |
| KBS Drama Awards | 2014 | Best Couple Award | Park Min-young (with Ji Chang-wook); Healer | Won | |
| KBS Drama Awards | 2017 | Excellence Award, Actress in a Mid-length Drama | Queen for Seven Days | Nominated | |
| KCA Consumer Day Awards | 2018 | Best Drama Actress | What's Wrong with Secretary Kim | Won | |
| Korea Drama Awards | 2011 | Best Actress | Sungkyunkwan Scandal & City Hunter | Nominated | |
| MBC Entertainment Awards | 2007 | Best New Actress in Comedy/Sitcom | High Kick! | Won | |
| MBC Drama Awards | 2014 | Excellence Award, Actress in a Miniseries | A New Leaf | Nominated | |
| SBS Drama Awards | 2011 | Excellence Award, Actress in a Drama Special | City Hunter | Nominated | |
| SBS Drama Awards | 2011 | Popularity Award | City Hunter | Nominated | |
| SBS Drama Awards | 2011 | Best Couple Award | Park Min-young (with Lee Min-ho); City Hunter | Nominated | |
| SBS Drama Awards | 2016 | Top Excellence Award, Actress in a Genre Drama | Remember | Nominated | |
| Seoul International Drama Awards | 2011 | Outstanding Korean Actress | Sungkyunkwan Scandal | Nominated | |
| Soompi Awards | 2018 | Actress of the year | Queen for Seven Days | Nominated | |
| Soompi Awards | 2018 | Best Kiss Award | Park Min-young (with Yeon Woo-jin); Queen for Seven Days | Nominated | |
| Soompi Awards | 2019 | Best Actress of the Year | What's Wrong with Secretary Kim | Won | |
| Soompi Awards | 2019 | Best Couple | Park Min-young (with Park Seo-joon); What's Wrong with Secretary Kim | Nominated | |
| StarHub Night of Stars | 2019 | Best Female Asian Star | Her Private Life | Won | |
| Top Chinese Music Awards | 2012 | Fashion Artist Award | Park Min-young | Won | |
| tvN Joy Festival | 2018 | Female Character of the Year | What's Wrong with Secretary Kim | Won | |
| tvN Joy Festival | 2018 | Thursday Icon | What's Wrong with Secretary Kim | Won | |
| Visionary Awards | 2026 | 2026 Visionary | Park Min-young | Won | |

=== State honors ===
Name of the organization, year given, and name of honor
| Organization | Year | Honor | Ref. |
|---|---|---|---|
| National Tax Service | 2021 | Presidential Commendation | |

=== Listicles ===
Name of publisher, year listed, name of listicle, and placement
| Publisher | Year | Listicle | Rank | Ref. |
|---|---|---|---|---|
| Forbes | 2012 | Korea Power Celebrity | 23rd | |
