= I'm a Pet =

South Korean reality variety show

- Hangul: 나는 펫
- RR: Naneun pet
- MR: Nanŭn p'et
- Genre: Reality television
- Country of origin: South Korea
- Original language: Korean

Production
- Camera setup: Multi-camera
- Running time: 25 minutes
- Production company: Comedy TV

Original release
- Network: Comedy TV
- Release: July 14, 2007 – August 29, 2009

I'm a Pet (Korean: 나는펫) is a South Korean variety show, aired on Comedy TV, a channel affiliated with YTN Media It is a reality show that depicts the story of a financially independent single career woman living together with a handsome younger man whom she treats as a pet. It gained attention for its concept, achieving viewership ratings in the 1% range from its first season. Most cast members were ordinary people, but there are many who appeared who have since become famous, such as Yoo In-na, Kim Si-hyang, Jeong Ga-eun and more. Each season was 15 episodes until season 7, when was it reduced to 8 episodes; season 7 was also the final season.

== Seasons ==
=== Season 1 (2007.07.14 – 2007.10.20) ===
- Kim Hee-joo (female) & Yoo Sung-min (male)
- Cheongmi (female) & Lim Se-hyeok (male)
- Kim Mokryeon (female) & Choi Dong-geun (male)

=== Season 2 (2007.10.28 – 2008.02.04) ===
- Kim Yuri = Yuri Arai (Female) & Jeong Jin-seong (male)
- Kim Hwa-yeon (female) & Lee Chang-min (male)
- Shin Dong-hee (female) & Kim Hyun-woong (male)

=== Season 3 (2008.02.09 – 2008.06.16) ===
- Lee Ji-eun (female)b Yumi (female) & Lee Kkotnam (male)
- Kim Si-hyang (female) & Kim Seon-hyung (male)
- Kim Yu-jin (female) & Seong Ki-guk (male)

=== Season 4 (2008.06.31 – 2008.09.13) ===
- Yoo Ah-reum (female) & Yoo Min-wook (male), Park Ji-hwan (male)
- Ji Ho-jin (female) & Choi Kang-hwi (male), Kim Soo-hwan (male)
- Kim Ye-jin (female) & Kim Do-hyeok (male)

=== Season 5 (2008.09.20 – 2009.01.10) ===
- Jeong Ga-eun (female) & Lim Dong-kyun (male)
- Eun Hyerin (female) & Yoon Kwangsun (male)
- Han Se-ju (female) & Park Gi-pyo (male)

=== Season 6 (2009.01.17 – 2009.04.18) ===
- Yoo Eun-hye (female) & Choi Gwan-hee (male)
- Park Ji-yoon (female) & Lee Sang-jin (male)
- Choi Yeon-kyung (female) & Shin Jong-ho (male)

=== Season 7 (2009.07.11 – 2009.08.29) ===
- Paris Munshu (Moon Sook-young) (female) & Kim Kyung-hyeon (male)
- Jang Eun-ae (female) & Koo Hyun-ho (male)
- Kim Joohyun (female) & So Joonyoung (male)
