= Ga-eun =

Korean given name

- Hangul: 가은
- RR: Gaeun
- MR: Kaŭn
- IPA: [kaɯn]

Ga-eun, Gaeun, Kaeun or Ka Un (Korean: 가은) is a Korean given name.

People with this name include:

- Kim Ga-eun, a South Korean actress
- Kim Ga-eun (badminton), a South Korean badminton player
- Jeong Ga-eun, a South Korean actress
- Yoon Ga-eun, a South Korean film director
- Cho Ka-eun, a South Korean singer
- Lee Gaeun from Produce 101

Fictional characters with this name include:

- Gaeun Lee, a protagonist from The Haunted House animated series
