= Park Young-rin =

South Korean actress (born 1984)

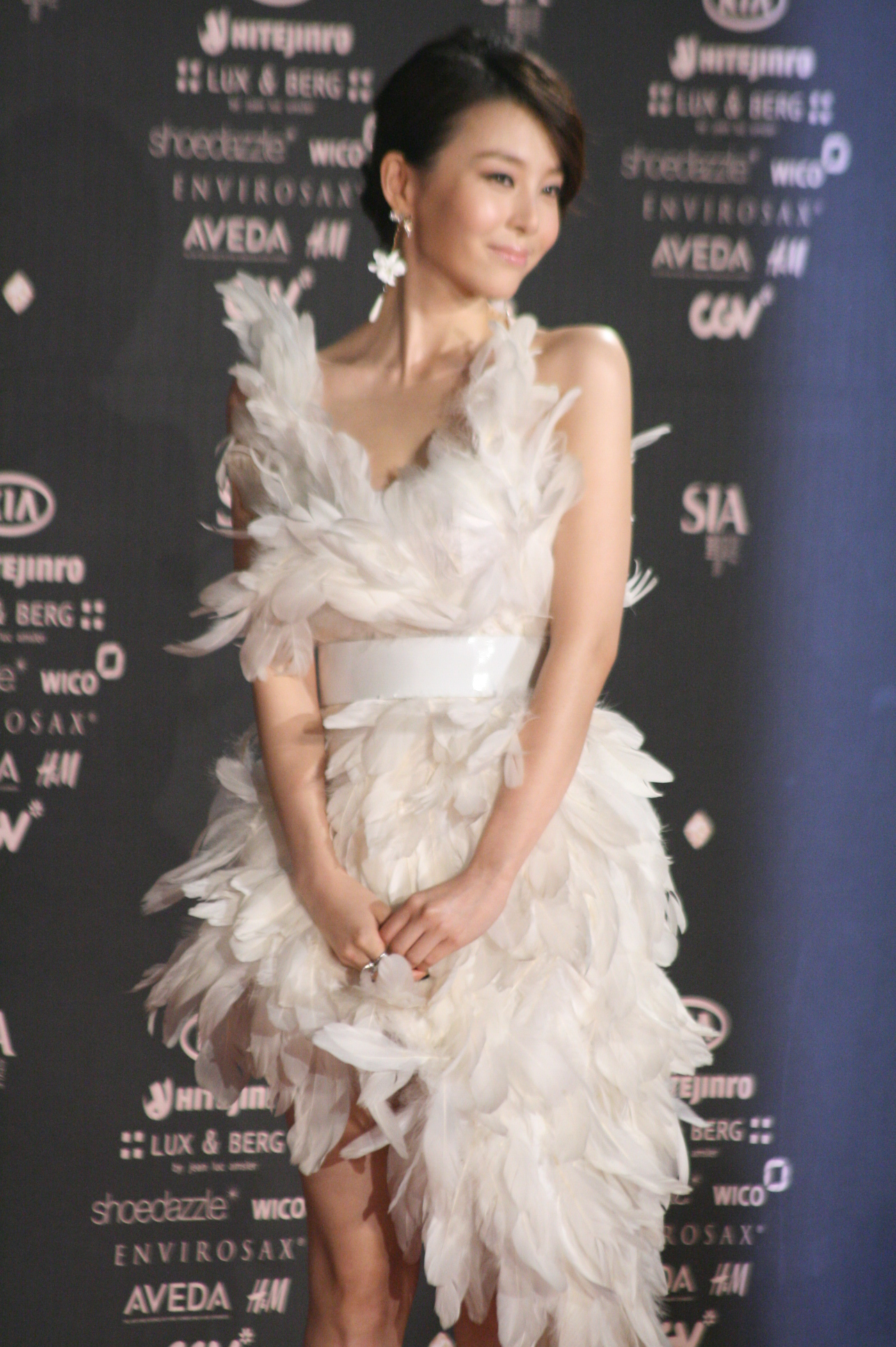
- Park in November 2011
- Born: February 24, 1984 (age 42); Seosan, Chungcheong Province, South Korea
- Other name: Park Tae-in (박태인)
- Education: Baehwa Girls' High School; Hanyang University – Department of Theater and Film
- Occupations: Actress; TV personality
- Years active: 2006–present
- Agent: WS Entertainment

Korean name
- Hangul: 박영린
- Hanja: 朴榮鄰
- RR: Bak Yeongrin
- MR: Pak Yŏngnin

Stage name
- Hangul: 박태인
- RR: Bak Taein
- MR: Pak T'aein

Park Young-rin (Korean: 박영린; born February 24, 1984), alias Park Tae-in, is a South Korean actress. Park Young-rin served as the interview-host and debuted in "Entertainer Intermediary" in 2006. In 2008, she became an actor and appeared in TV series Don't Cry My Love (2008, MBC) and Birdie Buddy (2010). She appeared as the protagonist villain of morning drama in Your Lady (2013). From the beginning of 2014 to May 2019, she performed on stage under the stage name of Park Tae-in (박태인), and changed her name back to her real name before acting in TV series Graceful Family (2019). In 2020 she is appearing in TV series Phoenix 2020.

== Career ==
In 2006, she appeared on J-POP Wave, a music program of cable TV station Mnet. In 2008, she made her debut as an actress in Don't Cry My Love produced by MBC. In 2009 she was cast in the main role in the musical work "Really Really Like". In 2010, while appearing in variety shows and current affairs programs, she played a reporter Park Eun-joo, in Birdie Buddy produced by tvN. In 2012, she appeared in the role of an actress in Queen In-hyun's Man. In 2013, she played the role of the fiancée of the chaebol in Your Lady, produced and broadcast by SBS.

In March 2014, she changed her stage name from Park Young-rin to Park Tae-in. After renaming, she passed the Hanyang University transfer exam and was transferred to the third grade of the theater and film department. She graduated in February 2016.

In 2015, she appeared in TV series Blood and in 2016, she was cast in film Girls' Stories. In 2017 she appeared in Sweet Revenge. She also appeared in the daily drama Sweet Enemy where she portrayed the envious main villain Hong Se-na who murdered her own bestfriend. In 2019, she changed her name back to Park Young-rin and appeared in Graceful Family, a TV series produced by MBN. She also made an appearance in Leverage as lawyer, telecast by TV Chosun.

In 2020, she appeared in Fatal Promise, by KBS, where she portrayed the evil and scheming surgeon Oh Hye-won who is willing to put someone in danger just to succeed. Recently she is appearing as the antagonist Miranda in the TV series Phoenix 2020, produced by SBS, a remake of 2004 series of the same name.

== Filmography ==
=== Film ===
| Year | Title | Role | Notes | Ref. |
|---|---|---|---|---|
| 2016 | Girls' Stories | Lee Ye-na | | |
| TBA | 4:44 Seconds | | Filming | |

=== Television series ===
| Year | Title | Role | Ref. |
|---|---|---|---|
| 2008–2009 | Don't Cry My Love | | |
| 2010 | Birdie Buddy | Park Eun Joo | |
| 2012 | Queen In-hyun's Man | Yoon Na-jeong | |
| 2013 | Your Lady | Min Se-yeon | |
| 2015 | Blood | Seo Hye-ri | |
| 2017 | Sweet Revenge | Hong Se-na | |
| 2019 | Graceful Family | Lee Kyeong-ah | |
| 2019 | Leverage | Lawyer | |
| 2020 | Fatal Promise | Oh Hye-won | |
| 2020 | Phoenix 2020 | Yoon Mi-ran (Miranda) | |

== Theatre ==
| Year | Title | Role | Notes | Ref. |
|---|---|---|---|---|
| 2009 | Really Really Like (진짜진짜 좋아해) | Uhm Jung Hwa | Musical | |

== Awards and nominations ==
| Award ceremony | Year | Category | Nominated work | Result | Ref. |
|---|---|---|---|---|---|
| SBS Drama Awards | 2017 | Daily & Weekend Drama Category Female Outstanding Actor Award | Sweet Revenge | Nominated | |
