= Kim Si-hyang =

South Korean racing model (born 1982)

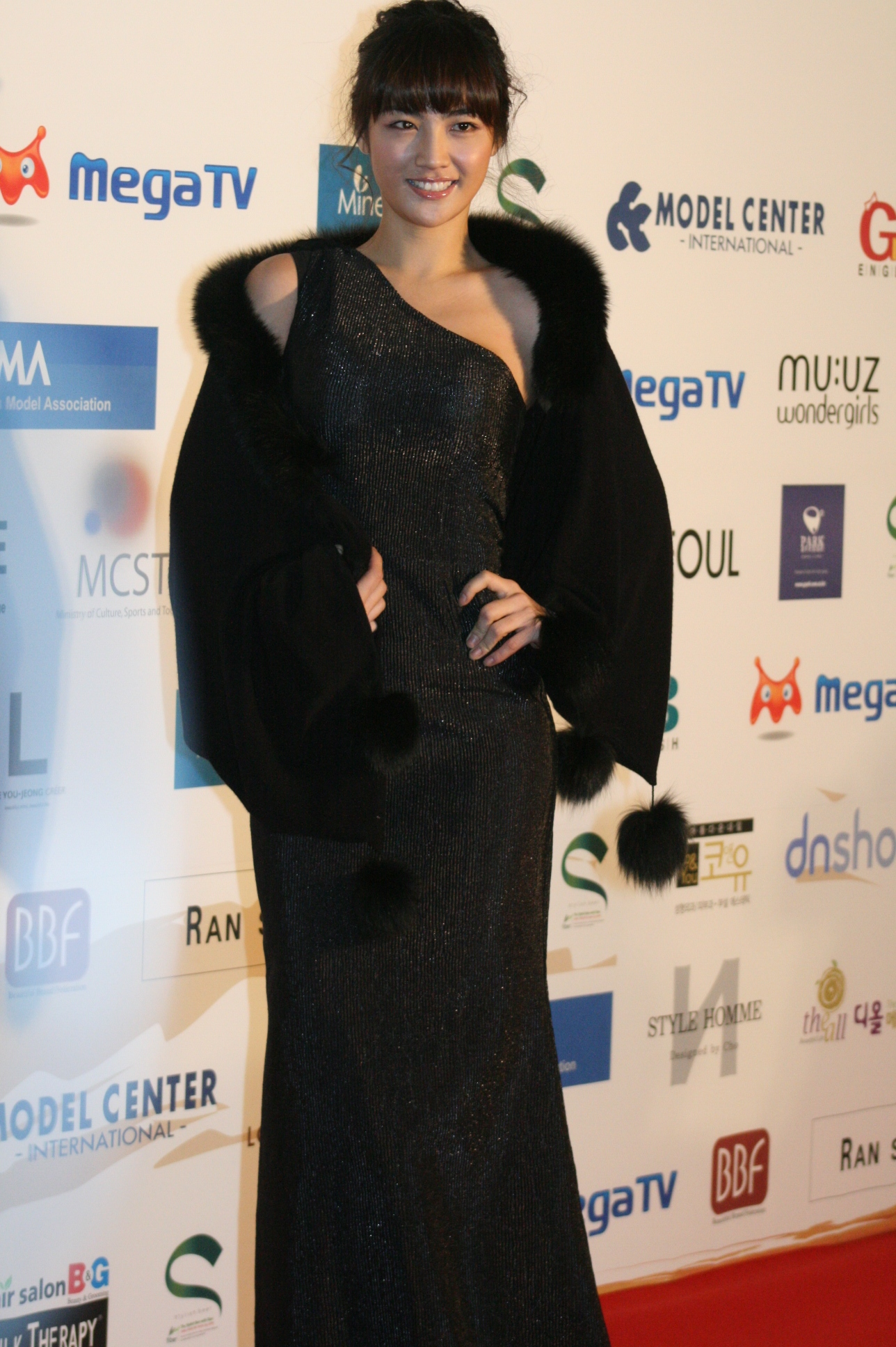
- Born: September 6, 1982 (age 42); Busan, South Korea
- Occupation(s): Racing model, television personality
- Height: 1.75 m (5 ft 9 in)

Korean name
- Hangul: 김시향
- RR: Gim Sihyang
- MR: Kim Sihyang

Kim Si-hyang (Korean: 김시향; born September 6, 1982) is a South Korean racing model and television personality.

== Biography ==
She debuted as a racing model at the 2003 Busan Motor Show and actively worked as a racing model and companion model for large-scale events until 2007. With her sophisticated image and healthy, attractive appearance, she gained a significant fanbase on online communities like DC Inside's Racing Model Gallery, which focuses on racing models.

In February 2007, she appeared on cable TV channel tvN's TvNGELS Season 2 as she prepared to debut in the entertainment industry. In February 2008, she starred as the lead in cable TV Comedy TV's Raising a Pet Man: I'm a Pet Season 3. Following this, she retired from racing modeling and officially debuted as a TV personality. Building on her popularity as a racing model, she gained further fame with her sophisticated yet pure image showcased in Raising a Pet Man: I'm a Pet Season 3, leading to appearances on various terrestrial and cable TV programs.

On January 12, 2009, she announced a temporary halt to her broadcasting activities to focus on studying acting and becoming a genuine actress. Although she resumed her broadcasting career in April 2009, she was unable to achieve significant success and eventually retired. On October 6, 2018, she married a hair designer who was working as a salon director at the time. She currently operates a flower shop called "Flower by Sihyang," located in Seoul.
