= Park Gi-pyo =

South Korean entertainer (born 1989)

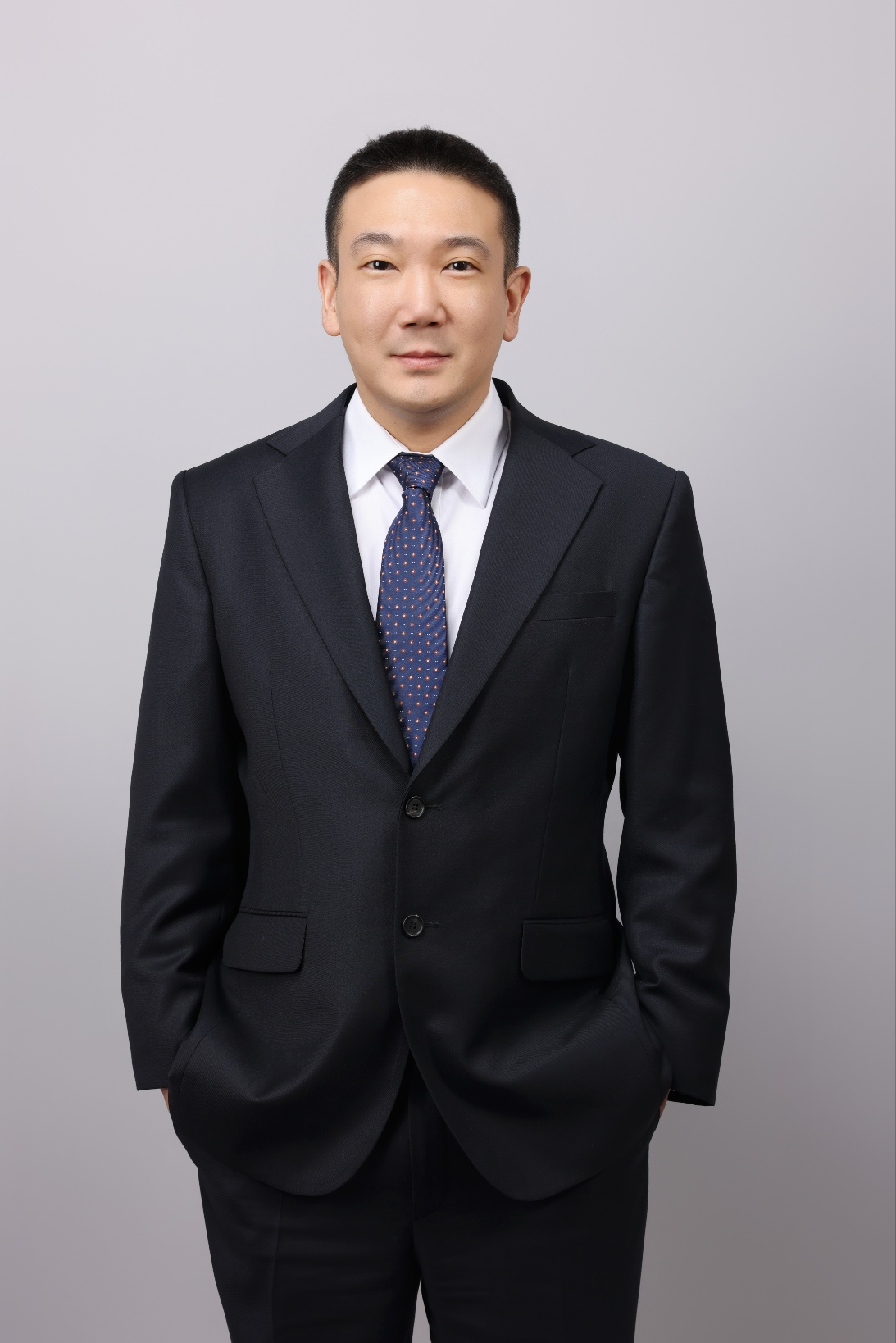
- Park in 2024
- Born: June 19, 1989 (age 37); Seoul, South Korea
- Occupations: Television personality; businessman

Korean name
- Hangul: 박기표
- Hanja: 朴起杓
- RR: Bak Gipyo
- MR: Pak Kip'yo

Park Gi-pyo (Korean: 박기표; born June 19, 1989) is a South Korean businessman and television personality.

== Biography ==
He made his debut in the entertainment industry in 2008 as a lead actor alongside Han Se-joo in Comedy TV's Raising a Pet Man: I'm a Pet Season 5. In 2009, he simultaneously worked as a model and broadcaster, appearing in the Apple iPhone 1 commercial. However, he decided to halt his broadcasting activities to focus on managing his father's company. In 2020, he returned to broadcasting, taking on the role of Danny in SBS's morning drama Phoenix 2020. Despite this, his comeback did not lead to further activities in the entertainment industry. Currently, he serves as the CEO and model of Safe Zone Korea Co., Ltd., a South Korean fashion company, dedicating himself to corporate management and supporting the entertainment industry.
