= Phoenix 2020 =

2020 South Korean television daily drama

- Promotional poster
- Also known as: Firebird
- Hangul: 불새 2020
- Lit.: Firebird 2020
- RR: Bulsae 2020
- MR: Pulsae 2020
- Genre: Melodrama; Romance
- Created by: Choi Young-hoon; Studio S (SBS)
- Written by: Lee Yoo-jin
- Directed by: Lee Hyun-jik
- Starring: Hong Soo-ah; Lee Jae-woo; Seo Ha-jun; Park Young-rin
- Composer: Choi Cheul-ho
- Country of origin: South Korea
- Original language: Korean
- No. of episodes: 120

Production
- Executive producer: Park Young-soo
- Producers: Ahn Je-hyun; Shin Sang-yoon
- Running time: 35 minutes
- Production companies: Studio S (SBS); Samhwa Networks
- Budget: ₩5.2 billion

Original release
- Network: SBS TV
- Release: October 26, 2020 – April 9, 2021

Related
- Phoenix (2004)

Phoenix 2020 (Korean: 불새 2020; RR: Bulsae 2020) is a South Korean television romantic drama series directed by Lee Hyun-jik starring Hong Soo-ah, Lee Jae-woo, Seo Ha-jun and Park Young-rin. The series is a reboot of the 2004 MBC series (Note: Produced by Chorokbaem Media and Diamond Ogilvy Group) of the same name and includes 120 episodes. The story follows a rich woman and a poor man who marry, get divorced, and meet again after their fortunes have reversed. It premiered on SBS TV on October 26, 2020, and aired on weekdays at 8:35 a.m. KST until April 9, 2021.

== Synopsis ==
Wealthy chaebol, Lee Ji-eun (Hong Soo-ah) falls in love with the poor Jang Sae-hoon and marries against their families' wishes. Ji-eun was engaged to Sae-hoon's family friend, Seo Jeong-in (Seo Ha-jun), but he was in a committed relationship with another woman. The couple was expecting a child despite the lack of approval from Jeong-in's father. Ji-eun and Sae-hoon eventually divorce, and Jeong-in later dies. After ten years, Ji-eun and Sae-hoon meet again but with swapped lifestyles. Once affluent, Ji-eun lost her fortune while Sae-hoon became a rich entrepreneur. Their changes in wealth allow them to view the world differently and understand each other leading to their reunification.

However, they both have other love interests. Ji-eun meets Seo Jeong-min (Seo Ha-jun), heir to the Seorin Group and Jeong-in's twin brother, and they start going out while Sae-hoon is dating his girlfriend, Mi-ran. At the same time, Jeong-min's ambitious stepmother, Choi Myung-hwa, wants to hang on to Seorin Group at all costs. She is Mi-ran's mother but living under an assumed name and has not seen Mi-ran in years. Jeong-min dislikes Myung-hwa, and Seo Moon-soo (chairman of Seorin Group, Jeong-min's father, and Myung-hwa's husband) plans to remove her.

The show ends with a series of legal cases against Seorin Group, ironically brought to court by Jeong-min himself after he tires of his father's controlling tendencies. Seo Moon-soo is angry at his only living son after Jeong-in's death. In the legal chaos, Moon-soo jettisons Myung-hwa but she kills him and stays with her daughter. Ji-eun and Jeong-min break up, and Ji-eun and Sae-hoon start to work together again.

== Cast ==
=== Main ===
- Hong Soo-ah as Lee Ji-eun, a chaebol, who ten years later, became a helper
- Lee Jae-woo as Jang Sae-hoon aka William Jang
- Seo Ha-joon as Seo Jeong-min
- Park Young-rin as Miranda

=== Supporting ===
- Yang Hye-jin as Cho Hyun-sook
- Kim Seung-hyun as Cho Hyun-min Lee Ji-eun's maternal uncle
- Lee Chung-mi as Ji-eun's younger sister
- Jeong Seo-ha as Lee Young-eun, Lee Ji-eun's sister
- Ok Ji-young as Nam Bok-ja, Lee Ji-eun's best friend

Jang Se-hun's family and people around him

- Shin Seong-gyun as Jang Ji-wook, Jang Se-hoon's father
- Kim Ho-chang as Kim Ho-jin, Jang Se-hun's best friend

Seo Jeong-min's family and people around him

- Kim Jong-seok as Seo Moon-soo
- Seo Ha-joon as Seo Jeong-in
- Hyuna Sung as Choi Myung-hwa /Baek Soon Su
- Yang Hong-seok as Shin A-jun
- Lee Chung-mi as Seo Eun Ju, secretary to Seo Jeong-min
- Jin Miryung as Seo Hee Su
- Park Gi-pyo as Danny (Seo Hee Su's son)

Others

- Oh Cho-hee as Hannah Na-kyung
- Kim Byung-chun as Park Kwang-cheol
- Kang Sung-jin as Lecturer

== Production ==
On June 30, 2020, SBS announced their remake of the 2004 drama Phoenix with the original writer, Lee Yoo-jin. The remake ran for 120 episodes, a much longer run compared to the original's 26 episodes. Lee Yoo-jin commented on the story, "It seems to be a different story from the original. The setting of reunion between Lee Ji-eun and Jang Se-hoon is changed, but the reunion and love journey of the two are different from the original. After reuniting the once-loved man and woman, the process of recovering and understanding the wounds that have been inflicted on each other has been depicted, rather than the ending of achieving love again." The filming started in the second half of 2020 and a production presentation was held on October 20, 2020.

== Release ==
The television series first aired on October 26, 2020, on SBS TV and aired on weekday mornings until April 9, 2021.

== Original soundtrack ==
Phoenix

Soundtrack album by Various Artists
- Released: 4 November 2020
- Genre: Soundtrack
- Languages: Korean; English
- Label: Warner Music

=== Part 1 ===
Released on November 4, 2020
| No. | Title | Lyrics | Music | Artist | Length |
|---|---|---|---|---|---|
| 1. | "Call your name" (박지용) | Yang Gyeong-seok, Park Ji-yong (Honey), Wooside | Yang Kyung-seok | Park Ji-yong (Honeyji) | 3:41 |
| 2. | "Call your name (Inst.)" | | Yang Kyung-seok | | 3:41 |
| Total length: | | | | | 7:22 |

=== Part 2 ===
Released on November 12, 2020
| No. | Title | Lyrics | Music | Artist | Length |
|---|---|---|---|---|---|
| 1. | "Will we be able to meet again" (기현 (Kihyun)) | ALMOND | 필승불패 | Kihyun | 4:00 |
| 2. | "Will we be able to meet again (Inst.)" | | 필승불패 | | 4:00 |
| Total length: | | | | | 8:00 |

=== Part 3 ===
Released on January 5, 2021
| No. | Title | Artist | Length |
|---|---|---|---|
| 1. | "Sight" | Jeok Woo | 3:22 |
| 2. | "Gaze (Inst.)" | | 3:22 |
| Total length: | | | 6:44 |

=== Part 4 ===
Released on January 11, 2021
| No. | Title | Artist | Length |
|---|---|---|---|
| 1. | "Beautiful days...and us" | DooBoo, Jincheol (Round About) | 3:39 |
| 2. | "Beautiful days...and us (Inst.)" | | 3:39 |
| Total length: | | | 7:18 |

=== Part 5 ===
Released on January 19, 2021
| No. | Title | Lyrics | Music | Artist | Length |
|---|---|---|---|---|---|
| 1. | "Love is leaving like this" | Victory and Defeat, ALMOND | Victory and Defeat | Kim Minwool | 3:17 |
| 2. | "Love is leaving like this (Inst.)" | | Victory and Defeat | | 3:17 |
| Total length: | | | | | 6:34 |

=== Part 6 ===
Released on January 25, 2021
| No. | Title | Lyrics | Artist | Length |
|---|---|---|---|---|
| 1. | "This mind wanders aimlessly" | Victory invincible, Almond | Gabin Han | 3:47 |
| 2. | "This mind wanders aimlessly (Inst.)" | | | 3:47 |
| Total length: | | | | 7:34 |

=== Part 7 ===
Released on February 1, 2021
| No. | Title | Lyrics | Music | Artist | Length |
|---|---|---|---|---|---|
| 1. | "A stuffy heart" | Victory and Defeat, ALMOND | Victory and Defeat, 1L2L | Lydia | 3:27 |
| 2. | "A stuffy heart (Inst.)" | | Victory and Defeat, 1L2L | | 3:27 |
| Total length: | | | | | 6:54 |

=== Part 8 ===
Released on February 8, 2021
| No. | Title | Lyrics | Music | Artist | Length |
|---|---|---|---|---|---|
| 1. | "Hold my hand" | Victorious and unsuccessful, ALMOND | Victorious and unsuccessful, LACONIC | Moon Songhee | 3:25 |
| 2. | "Hold my hand (Inst.)" | | Victorious and unsuccessful, LACONIC | | 3:25 |
| Total length: | | | | | 6:50 |

=== Part 9 ===
Released on February 15, 2021
| No. | Title | Lyrics | Music | Artist | Length |
|---|---|---|---|---|---|
| 1. | "You can't draw" | Haeun | Haeun, Park Jungjun | Damu | 3:16 |
| 2. | "You can't draw (Inst.)" | | Haeun, Park Jungjun | | 3:16 |
| Total length: | | | | | 6:32 |

=== Part 10 ===
Released on February 22, 2021
| No. | Title | Lyrics | Music | Artist | Length |
|---|---|---|---|---|---|
| 1. | "The Day We Loved Each Other" | Victory and Undefeated, Jamie, ALMOND | Undefeated, Jamie | 12DAL | 4:39 |
| 2. | "The Day We Loved Each Other" (Inst.) | | Undefeated, Jamie | | 4:39 |
| Total length: | | | | | 9:18 |

=== Part 11 ===
Released on March 1, 2021
| No. | Title | Lyrics | Music | Artist | Length |
|---|---|---|---|---|---|
| 1. | "Destiny" | Oh Heung-seon, Lee Yong-gyu, Shin Seong-jin | Oh Heung-seon, Lee Yong-gyu, Shin Seong-jin | Soo-ah, Park Jung-min | 5:02 |
| 2. | "Destiny" (Inst.) | | Oh Heung-seon, Lee Yong-gyu, Shin Seong-jin | | 5:02 |
| Total length: | | | | | 10:04 |

=== Part 12 ===
Released on March 8, 2021
| No. | Title | Lyrics | Music | Artist | Length |
|---|---|---|---|---|---|
| 1. | "Your memories, our memories" | Victory invincible, Yuk sang-hui, Almond | Victory invincible, Yuk sang-hui, Almond | Morning Coffee | 3:34 |
| 2. | "Your memories, our memories" (Inst.) | | Victory invincible, Yuk sang-hui, Almond | | 3:34 |
| Total length: | | | | | 7:08 |

=== Part 13 ===
Released on March 15, 2021
| No. | Title | Lyrics | Music | Artist | Length |
|---|---|---|---|---|---|
| 1. | "Until today" | Victorious and unsuccessful, Yoo-Kyung- hee, Almond | Victorious and un-defeated, Yoo-Suk-hee, 1L2L | Na-eun Seol | 3:32 |
| 2. | "Until today" (Inst.) | | Victorious and un-defeated, Yoo-Suk-hee, 1L2L | | 3:32 |
| Total length: | | | | | 7:04 |

=== Part 14 ===
Released on March 22, 2021
| No. | Title | Lyrics | Music | Artist | Length |
|---|---|---|---|---|---|
| 1. | "Every day I Love You" | Victory and Undefeated, Yoo, Yuk, and Almond | Un-defeated | CherryBerry | 3:22 |
| 2. | "Every day I Love You" (Inst.) | | | | 3:22 |
| Total length: | | | | | 6:44 |

=== Part 15 ===
Released on March 29, 2021
| No. | Title | Lyrics | Music | Artist | Length |
|---|---|---|---|---|---|
| 1. | "I Still Remember" (feat. Eun Chae) | Victory and Undefeated, Yoo, Yuk, and Almond | Un-defeated | Espresso | 3:04 |
| 2. | "I Still Remember" (Inst.) | | | | 3:04 |
| Total length: | | | | | 6:08 |

=== Part 16 ===
Released on April 5, 2021
| No. | Title | Lyrics | Music | Artist | Length |
|---|---|---|---|---|---|
| 1. | "Every Moment Is Happy" | Victory and Undefeated, Yoo Yuk-hee, Min-hyuk Jung | Victory and Defeat | Jung Min-hyuk, Nakyung | 3:23 |
| 2. | "Every Moment Is Happy" (Inst.) | | Victory and Defeat | | 3:23 |
| Total length: | | | | | 6:46 |

== Viewership ==
Phoenix : South Korea viewers per episode (thousands)

| Episodes | Episode number | | | | | | | | | | | | | | | | | | | |
| Episodes | 1 | 2 | 3 | 4 | 5 | 6 | 7 | 8 | 9 | 10 | 11 | 12 | 13 | 14 | 15 | 16 | 17 | 18 | 19 | 20 |
|---|---|---|---|---|---|---|---|---|---|---|---|---|---|---|---|---|---|---|---|---|
| Ep.01-20 | N/A | N/A | N/A | 748 | N/A | N/A | N/A | 700 | 727 | N/A | N/A | N/A | N/A | 760 | N/A | N/A | 681 | N/A | N/A | N/A |
| Ep.21-40 | 837 | 811 | 777 | 819 | N/A | N/A | N/A | N/A | 836 | N/A | N/A | N/A | 897 | 895 | 840 | N/A | N/A | N/A | 900 | N/A |
| Ep.41-60 | N/A | N/A | N/A | 795 | N/A | N/A | N/A | N/A | 913 | N/A | N/A | N/A | 833 | 897 | N/A | N/A | N/A | N/A | 883 | N/A |
| Ep.61-80 | N/A | 943 | 871 | 912 | 881 | N/A | N/A | N/A | 1021 | 887 | N/A | N/A | 849 | 876 | 795 | N/A | N/A | N/A | N/A | N/A |
| Ep.81-100 | N/A | N/A | N/A | 845 | 827 | N/A | N/A | N/A | 806 | N/A | N/A | N/A | 758 | 901 | 800 | N/A | N/A | 788 | 816 | N/A |
| Ep.101-120 | N/A | N/A | 718 | 799 | 883 | N/A | N/A | 710 | 814 | 811 | N/A | 869 | 814 | 864 | 942 | 884 | 752 | 767 | 792 | 853 |

Source: Audience measurement performed nationwide by °Nielsen Korea.

| Ep. | Original broadcast date | Average audience share | | |
| Ep. | Original broadcast date | Nielsen Korea | | TNmS |
| Ep. | Original broadcast date | °Nationwide | °°Seoul | Nationwide |
|---|---|---|---|---|
| 1 | October 26, 2020 | 5.4% | —N/a | 5.2% |
| 2 | October 27, 2020 | 4.6% | —N/a | 5.4% |
| 3 | October 28, 2020 | 4.7% | —N/a | 7.0% |
| 4 | October 29, 2020 | 4.8% | 4.6% | 5.4% |
| 5 | October 30, 2020 | 3.4% | —N/a | —N/a |
| 6 | November 2, 2020 | 5.0% | —N/a | 5.1% |
| 7 | November 3, 2020 | 5.2% | —N/a | 5.2% |
| 8 | November 4, 2020 | 4.7% | —N/a | 5.2% |
| 9 | November 5, 2020 | 5.2% | 5.0% | 4.9% |
| 10 | November 6, 2020 | 4.3% | —N/a | —N/a |
| 11 | November 9, 2020 | 5.1% | —N/a | 5.0% |
| 12 | November 10, 2020 | 4.5% | —N/a | 4.7% |
| 13 | November 11, 2020 | 4.7% | —N/a | 5.2% |
| 14 | November 12, 2020 | 5.1% | 4.6% | 5.4% |
| 15 | November 13, 2020 | 5.2% | —N/a | —N/a |
| 16 | November 16, 2020 | 4.8% | —N/a | 5.2% |
| 17 | November 17, 2020 | 4.5% | —N/a | 5.0% |
| 18 | November 18, 2020 | 4.1% | —N/a | 5.0% |
| 19 | November 19, 2020 | 4.6% | —N/a | —N/a |
| 20 | November 20, 2020 | 5.0% | —N/a | —N/a |
| 21 | November 23, 2020 | 5.5% | 5.1% | 5.5% |
| 22 | November 24, 2020 | 5.4% | 5.1% | 5.3% |
| 23 | November 25, 2020 | 4.9% | —N/a | 5.6% |
| 24 | November 26, 2020 | 5.3% | 5.2% | 5.7% |
| 25 | November 27, 2020 | 5.5% | —N/a | 5.6% |
| 26 | November 30, 2020 | 5.0% | —N/a | 6.0% |
| 27 | December 1, 2020 | 5.3% | —N/a | 5.6% |
| 28 | December 2, 2020 | 5.1% | —N/a | 5.4% |
| 29 | December 3, 2020 | 5.7% | 5.3% | 6.2% |
| 30 | December 4, 2020 | 5.1% | —N/a | 5.6% |
| 31 | December 7, 2020 | 5.4% | —N/a | 5.2% |
| 32 | December 8, 2020 | 5.1% | —N/a | 5.7% |
| 33 | December 9, 2020 | 5.8% | 5.5% | 5.1% |
| 34 | December 10, 2020 | 5.9% | 5.6% | 5.3% |
| 35 | December 11, 2020 | 5.3% | 4.9% | 5.9% |
| 36 | December 14, 2020 | 5.4% | —N/a | 5.8% |
| 37 | December 15, 2020 | 5.9% | —N/a | 5.4% |
| 38 | December 16, 2020 | 5.5% | —N/a | 5.4% |
| 39 | December 17, 2020 | 5.8% | 5.4% | 5.6% |
| 40 | December 18, 2020 | 5.8% | 5.8% | 5.4% |
| 41 | December 21, 2020 | 5.9% | 5.9% | 5.5% |
| 42 | December 22, 2020 | 5.7% | —N/a | 5.6% |
| 43 | December 23, 2020 | 5.0% | —N/a | 5.2% |
| 44 | December 24, 2020 | 5.5% | 5.0% | 5.8% |
| 45 | December 25, 2020 | 5.0% | 4.8% | 5.6% |
| 46 | December 28, 2020 | 5.7% | —N/a | 5.4% |
| 47 | December 29, 2020 | 5.6% | —N/a | 5.6% |
| 48 | December 30, 2020 | 5.5% | —N/a | 5.7% |
| 49 | December 31, 2020 | 6.4% | 6.3% | 6.3% |
| 50 | January 1, 2021 | 4.2% | —N/a | —N/a |
| 51 | January 4, 2021 | 5.8% | —N/a | 6.9% |
| 52 | January 5, 2021 | 5.8% | —N/a | 6.1% |
| 53 | January 6, 2021 | 5.4% | —N/a | 5.9% |
| 54 | January 7, 2021 | 6.1% | —N/a | 6.0% |
| 55 | January 8, 2021 | 6.2% | —N/a | 6.3% |
| 56 | January 11, 2021 | 5.7% | —N/a | 6.6% |
| 57 | January 12, 2021 | 5.9% | —N/a | 6.0% |
| 58 | January 13, 2021 | 5.3% | —N/a | 5.7% |
| 59 | January 14, 2021 | 6.2% | 6.2% | 5.5% |
| 60 | January 15, 2021 | 5.3% | —N/a | 6.1% |
| 61 | January 18, 2021 | 5.4% | —N/a | 6.2% |
| 62 | January 19, 2021 | 6.5% | 6.3% | 6.2% |
| 63 | January 20, 2021 | 6.0% | 5.8% | 5.4% |
| 64 | January 21, 2021 | 5.5% | 5.1% | 6.0% |
| 65 | January 22, 2021 | 5.7% | —N/a | 5.5% |
| 66 | January 25, 2021 | 5.7% | 5.2% | 5.8% |
| 67 | January 26, 2021 | 6.1% | —N/a | 6.3% |
| 68 | January 27, 2021 | 5.1% | —N/a | 5.9% |
| 69 | January 28, 2021 | 6.5% | 6.3% | 6.0% |
| 70 | January 29, 2021 | 5.7% | 5.5% | 5.8% |
| 71 | February 1, 2021 | 5.4% | —N/a | 5.8% |
| 72 | February 2, 2021 | 5.6% | —N/a | 5.9% |
| 73 | February 3, 2021 | 5.5% | 5.2% | 5.7% |
| 74 | February 4, 2021 | 5.7% | 5.1% | 5.9% |
| 75 | February 5, 2021 | 5.0% | —N/a | 5.8% |
| 76 | February 8, 2021 | 5.1% | —N/a | 6.0% |
| 77 | February 9, 2021 | 5.3% | —N/a | 5.5% |
| 78 | February 10, 2021 | 4.9% | —N/a | 4.8% |
| 79 | February 11, 2021 | 4.7% | —N/a | —N/a |
| 80 | February 12, 2021 | 2.8% | —N/a | —N/a |
| 81 | February 15, 2021 | 5.8% | —N/a | 5.6% |
| 82 | February 16, 2021 | 5.3% | —N/a | 5.4% |
| 83 | February 17, 2021 | 5.2% | 4.8% | 4.9% |
| 84 | February 18, 2021 | 5.7% | 5.6% | 5.8% |
| 85 | February 19, 2021 | 5.4% | 5.3% | 5.5% |
| 86 | February 22, 2021 | 5.1% | —N/a | —N/a |
| 87 | February 23, 2021 | 5.1% | —N/a | 5.1% |
| 88 | February 24, 2021 | 4.8% | —N/a | 4.6% |
| 89 | February 25, 2021 | 5.5% | 5.4% | 4.8% |
| 90 | February 26, 2021 | 3.7% | —N/a | —N/a |
| 91 | March 1, 2021 | 5.0% | —N/a | —N/a |
| 92 | March 2, 2021 | 5.5% | —N/a | 5.4% |
| 93 | March 3, 2021 | 5.2% | —N/a | 5.3% |
| 94 | March 4, 2021 | 5.9% | 5.3% | 5.9% |
| 95 | March 5, 2021 | 5.3% | —N/a | 5.4% |
| 96 | March 8, 2021 | 5.1% | —N/a | 4.7% |
| 97 | March 9, 2021 | 5.9% | 5.4% | 5.2% |
| 98 | March 10, 2021 | 5.3% | 5.3% | 5.2% |
| 99 | March 11, 2021 | 5.4% | 5.1% | 5.1% |
| 100 | March 12, 2021 | 5.2% | —N/a | 5.7% |
| 101 | March 15, 2021 | 4.6% | —N/a | —N/a |
| 102 | March 16, 2021 | 5.5% | 5.5% | 5.7% |
| 103 | March 17, 2021 | 4.8% | —N/a | 5.2% |
| 104 | March 18, 2021 | 5.4% | 5.1% | 5.5% |
| 105 | March 19, 2021 | 5.8% | 5.6% | 6.4% |
| 106 | March 22, 2021 | 5.2% | —N/a | 6.2% |
| 107 | March 23, 2021 | 5.4% | 5.5% | 5.7% |
| 108 | March 24, 2021 | 5.0% | 4.9% | 5.7% |
| 109 | March 25, 2021 | 5.4% | 5.6% | 5.5% |
| 110 | March 26, 2021 | 5.2% | 4.9% | 6.1% |
| 111 | March 29, 2021 | 5.8% | —N/a | 6.3% |
| 112 | March 29, 2021 | 5.9% | 5.6% | 6.4% |
| 113 | March 30, 2021 | 5.8% | 5.5% | 6.3% |
| 114 | March 30, 2021 | 5.7% | 5.4% | 6.3% |
| 115 | March 31, 2021 | 6.3% | 5.9% | 6.9% |
| 116 | April 5, 2021 | 5.9% | 5.8% | 6.2% |
| 117 | April 6, 2021 | 5.3% | | 5.9% |
| 118 | April 7, 2021 | 5.4% | 5.2% | 4.8% |
| 119 | April 8, 2021 | 5.5% | 5.4% | 5.9% |
| 120 | April 9, 2021 | 5.7% | 5.7% | 5.5% |
| Average | | 5.33% | — (Note: Due to some ratings not recorded, the exact average rating is unknown.) | — |
In this table, the blue numbers represent the lowest ratings and the red numbers represent the highest ratings.; N/A denotes that the rating is not known.
°(Analysis criteria: 13 regions nationwide, households, unit:%); °°(Analysis criteria: metropolitan area, household, unit:%)

== Awards and nominations ==
| Year | Award | Category | Nominee | Result | Ref. |
|---|---|---|---|---|---|
| 2020 | SBS Drama Awards | Top Excellence Award, Actor in a Mid/Long-length Drama | Lee Jae-woo | Nominated | |
| 2020 | SBS Drama Awards | Top Excellence Award, Actress in a Mid/Long-length Drama | Hong Soo-ah | Nominated | |
| 2020 | SBS Drama Awards | Excellence Award, Actor in a Mid/Long-length Drama | Seo Ha-joon | Nominated | |
