= Shin Soo-yeon =

South Korean actress (born 2004)

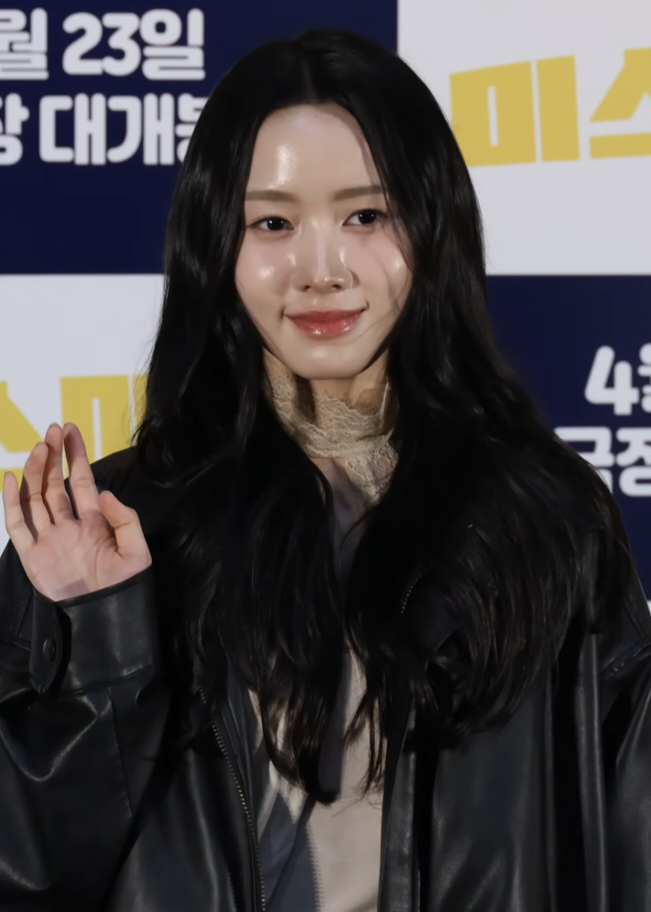
- Shin in April 2026
- Born: 29 November 2004 (age 21); Incheon, South Korea
- Other names: Shin Soo-yun
- Education: Inhwa Girls' Middle School
- Occupations: Actress; model
- Years active: 2009–present
- Agent: Hunus Entertainment
- Known for: Hi Bye, Mama! The World of the Married; Graceful Family

Korean name
- Hangul: 신수연
- RR: Sin Suyeon
- MR: Sin Suyŏn

Shin Soo-yeon (Korean: 신수연; born 29 November 2004) is a South Korean actress and model. She is known for her roles in dramas such as Hi Bye, Mama!, Graceful Family, Encounter (2018–19), and The World of the Married.

== Filmography ==
=== Film ===
Year	Title	Role	Ref.
2010	The Unjust	Tae-ra	
2011	Late Blossom	Hwang Min-ji	
2014	The Legacy	Kyung-hee (young)	
2014	Mourning Grave	Jung Se-hee (young)	
2015	The Night of the Prophet	Yeo-joo (young)	
2015	The Throne	Lady Hyegyeong (young)	
2016	Run-Off	Ri Ji-hye (young)	
2019	The Divine Move 2: The Wrathful	Soo-yeon	
2020	Steel Rain 2: Summit	Young-hee	
2022	Emergency Declaration	High School Student	
2023	Devils	Hyun-ah	
2026	Mismatch	Ji-yun	

=== Television series ===
Year	Title	Role	Ref.
2009	High Kick Through the Roof	Jung Hae-ri (young)	
2010	Queen of Reversals	So-ra	
2011	Twinkle Twinkle	Park Ji-won	
2011	When Women Powder Twice	So-young	
2012	Late Blossom	Hwang Min-ji	
2013	Blooded Palace: The War of Flowers	Seol-hwa	
2013	Love in Her Bag	Eun Kyung-hee/Kim Seo-hyun (young)	
2013	Reply 1994	Sung Na-jung (young)	
2014	Jang Bo-ri Is Here!	Yeon Min-jung (young)	
2014	Doctor Stranger	Oh Soo-hyun (young)	
2014	Healer	Chae Young-shin (10-year-old)	
2015	I Have a Lover	Baek-jo	
2016	My Fair Lady	Eun-soo	
2017	Saimdang, Memoir of Colors	Yi Mae-chang	
2018	Mr. Sunshine	Soo-mi	
2018	Encounter	Ji-yoo	
2019	The Crowned Clown	Dal-rae	
2019	Love Affairs in the Afternoon	Lee Ah-jin	
2019	Graceful Family	Mo Seok-hee (young)	
2020	Hi Bye, Mama!	Jang Young-shim	
2020	The World of the Married	Yoon No-eul	
2020	The King: Eternal Monarch	Koo Seo-ryeong (young)	
2020	Do You Like Brahms?	Lee Jung-kyung (young)	
2021	Melancholia	Choi Si-an	
2021	Bulgasal: Immortal Souls	Lee Hye-suk	
2022	Doctor Lawyer	Geum Seok-yeong (young)	
2024	The Escape of the Seven	Han-na	

== Awards and nominations ==
Year	Award	Category	Nominee / Work	Result	Ref.
2010	Lotte Department Store Pretty Child Competition	Grand Prize Pretty Child	Shin Soo-yeon	Won	
2010	Grand Prize at Mimi Princess Competition	Grand Prize Mimi Princess	Shin Soo-yeon	Won	
2012	Tuta Kids Model Contest	Kids Model Contest	Shin Soo-yeon	Won	
