= Jeong Ga-eun =

South Korean actress (born 1978)

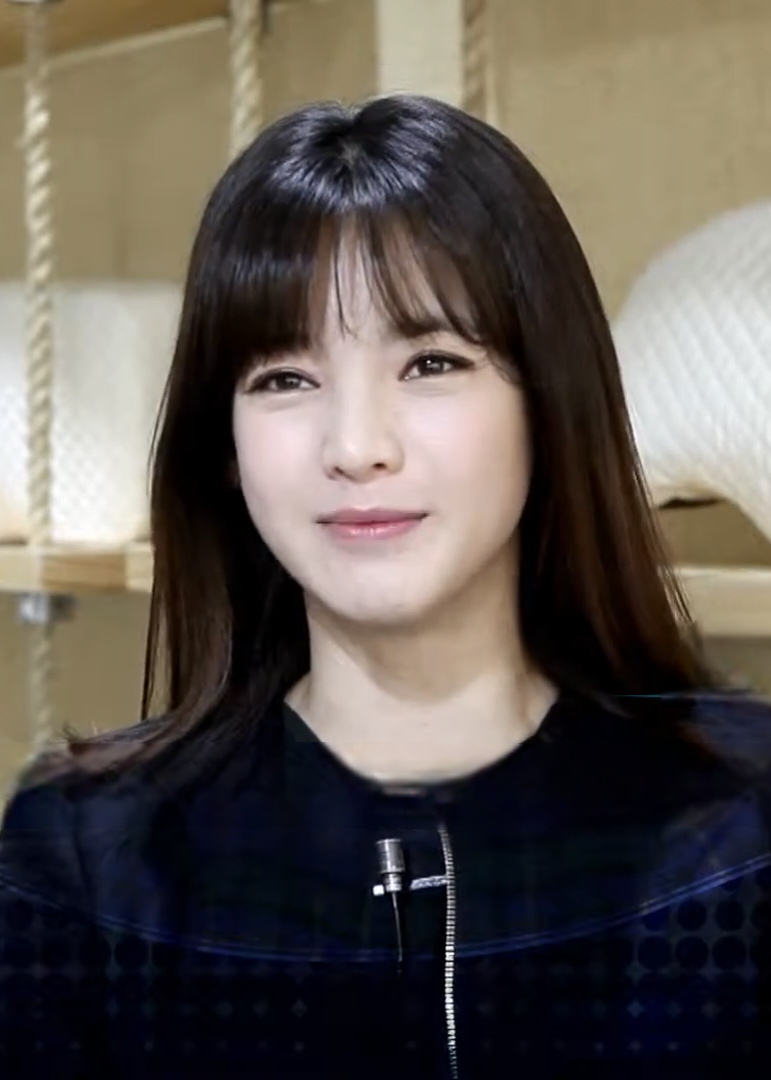
- Jeong in June 2015
- Born: Baek Seong-hyang (백성향); May 21, 1978 (age 48); Busan, South Korea
- Occupations: Actress; model
- Years active: 2001–present
- Agent: Double V Entertainment
- Spouse: Unknown (m. 2016; div. 2018)
- Children: 1 daughter

Korean name
- Hangul: 백라희
- RR: Baek Rahui
- MR: Paek Rahŭi

Stage name
- Hangul: 정가은
- Hanja: 鄭佳恩
- RR: Jeong Gaeun
- MR: Chŏng Kaŭn

Baek Ra-hee (Korean: 백라희; born May 21, 1978), better known by her stage name Jeong Ga-eun (정가은), is a South Korean actress, taxi driver, and clothing retailer who has appeared in several Korean television series such as Rollercoaster and Sunday Sunday Night.

== Career ==
Debuting as a beauty contestant for Miss Gyeongnam Seon of 2001, Jeong began a career in the entertainment industry by serving as the fitting model and face of CJ O Shopping's clothing merchandise. Debuting as a beauty contestant for Miss South Gyeongsang Province Seon of 2001, Jeong began a career in the entertainment industry by serving as the fitting model and face of CJ O Shopping's clothing merchandise.

Soon after, Jeong rose to fame as a TV personality, joining variety show casts such as Sponge 2.0, BEAST Idol Maid, Infinite Girls and Heroes. She concurrently made several Korean soap operas and commercials including LG's TNGT in 2006 and SK Telecom in 2007.

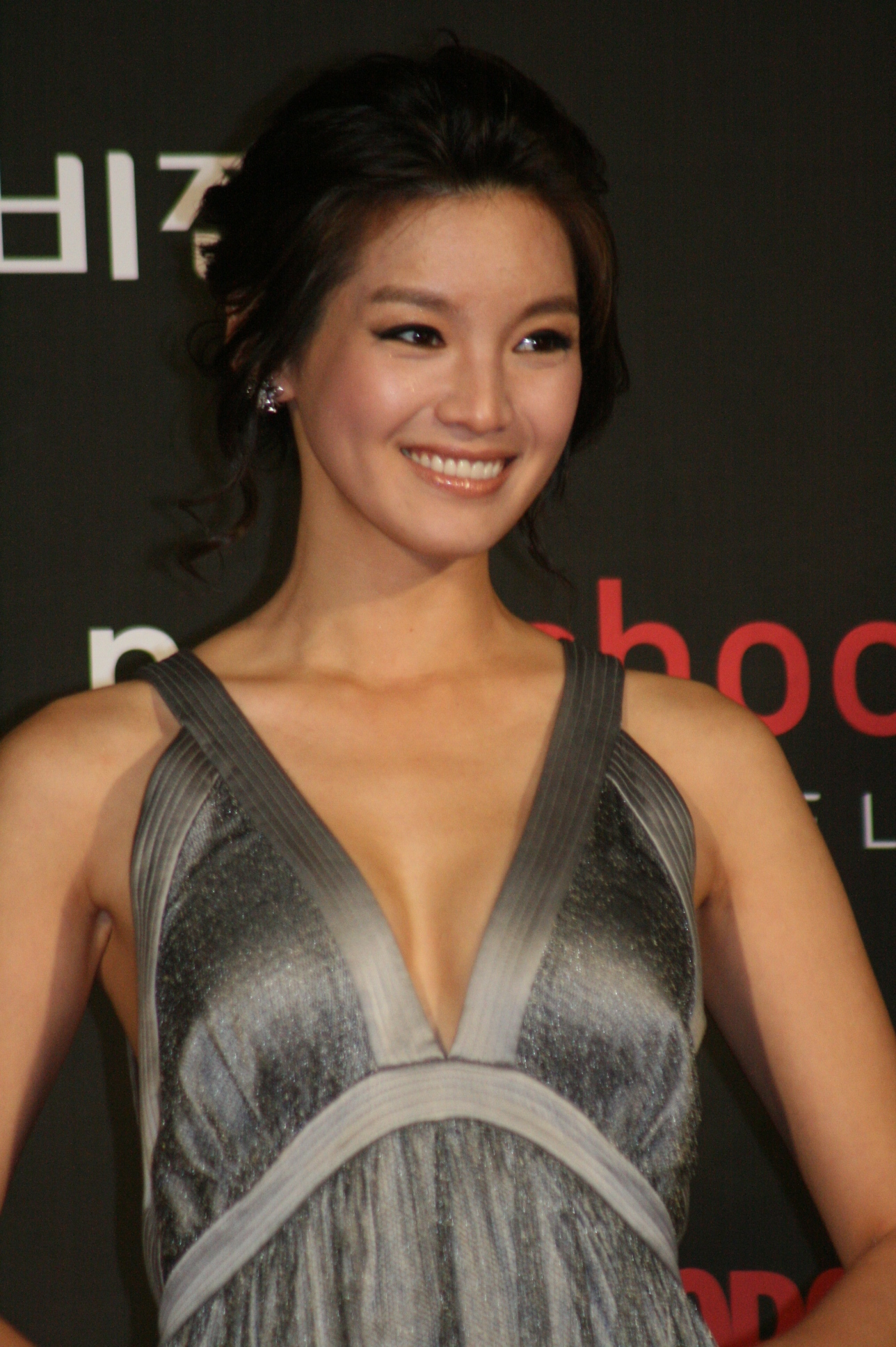
Jung in 2009

In July 2009, she joined a situation comedy programme called Rollercoaster of South Korean cable channel tvN, and it boosted her popularity. Since creating it in 2009, Jeong co-operates an online dress mall called Jungganda (정간다; Korean, "Jeong is coming").

== Personal life ==
Jeong married a businessman on January 30, 2016, in Gangnam, Seoul. She gave birth to a daughter on July 20. On January 26, 2018, her agency announced their divorce. In 2025, Jeong revealed that she had been defrauded by her ex-husband and became a taxi driver to support herself and their daughter, whom she has custody of.

== Filmography ==
Films

- Tales of Nobody (2023)

Television

- Comedy TV Raising a Pet Man: I'm a Pet Season 5 (2008)
- KBS2 Sponge 2.0 (2003–2012)
- MBC Sunday Sunday Night (2009–2014)
- tvN Rollercoaster, lead actress with Jeong Hyeong-don (2009–2011)
- MBC Infinite Girls (2009–2013)
- SBS Good Sunday's Yo Girls Diary Season 2 (2010)
- SBS Heroes (2010–2011)
- MBC every1 Beast Idol Maid (2010)
- SBS Master's Sun as Ahn Jin-joo (2013)
- MBC A Thousand Kisses as Jang Hye-bin (2011–2012)
- tvN Rollercoaster 2 (2012)
- KBS2 Family (2012) cameo
- SBS Plus Her Lovely Heels (2014)
- SBS FiL, SBS M, Lifetime Shall I Light Your Daily Life (Host, 2021–2022)

Music video appearance

- Shinhwa's "Throw my fist" (2006)
