= Shining Romance =

2013–2014 South Korean television series

- Promotional poster
- Genre: Drama; Romance; Soap opera
- Written by: Seo Hyun-joo
- Directed by: Shin Hyung-chan; Jung Ji-in
- Starring: Lee Jin; Park Yoon-jae; Jo An
- Music by: Jeong Se-rin
- Country of origin: South Korea
- Original language: Korean
- No. of episodes: 122

Production
- Executive producer: Kim Kyung-hee
- Running time: 40 minutes
- Production company: Munhwa Broadcasting Corporation

Original release
- Network: MBC TV
- Release: December 23, 2013 – June 20, 2014

Shining Romance (Korean: 빛나는 로맨스; RR: Binnaneun romaenseu) is a South Korean daily television drama series starring Lee Jin, Park Yoon-jae and Jo An. It aired on MBC TV from December 23, 2013 to June 20, 2014 on Mondays to Fridays at 19:15 for 122 episodes.

== Plot ==
"Super mom" Oh Bit-na has been a housewife for five years to her plastic surgeon husband and five-year-old daughter named Yeon-doo. One day, she coincidentally meets her childhood friend, Ha-joon. Ha-joon still remembers his promise to Bit-na that they made in elementary school. Their promise was to grow up and marry with each other. But Chae-ri, who has her heart set for Ha-joon, is jealous of Bit-na and tries to stop Bit-na from marrying with Ha-joon. Chae-ri also tries to stop Bit-na from becoming the best cook in Chunwoongak, where Chae-ri lives, and knowing that Professor Jang (Chae-ri's foster father) is Bit-na's biological father. Bit-na's husband, Byun Tae-shik cheats on Bit-na and has an affair with a con artist named Emma. To marry Emma (mostly for money) Byun Tae-shik tricks Bit-na into an unfair fake divorce. When Ha-joon knows that Bit-na is divorced, he does anything to make her become his girlfriend and soon, become his wife. Chae-ri and her mother, Kim Ae-sook, try to stop Bit-na but Bit-na, smart and quick-witted, avoids the traps set by them. When the truth about Bit-na being the daughter of Professor Jang gets revealed, Bit-na becomes the owner of Chungwookgak. Kim Ae-sook throws down a big flower pot that was meant for Bit-na, but hit Ae-sook's own daughter, Chae-ri. Therefore, Chae-ri seriously injures her head and starts acting like a five-year old, even calling Bit-na's young daughter "older sister". Ae-sook is arrested for her many crimes, especially for switching Chae-ri and Bit-na when they were babies, twisting their fates. Lee Tae-ri, turns herself into the police for a hit-and-run accident that she caused and killed Bit-na's foster father. The final episode of Shining Romance ends with Yeon-doo in Ha-joon's arms, Bit-na walking along beside them.

== Cast ==
- Lee Jin as Oh Bit-na
- Park Yoon-jae as Kang Ha-joon
- Jo An as Jang Chae-ri
- Heo Jung-eun as Byun Yeon-doo
- Lee Hwi-hyang as Kim Ae-sook
- Hong Yo-seob as Jang Jae-ik
- Jeon Yang-ja as Yoon Bok-shim
- Kyeon Mi-ri as Lee Tae-ri
- Jung Han-yong as Kang Dae-poong
- Yoo Min-kyu as Kang Ki-joon
- Kwak Ji-min as Oh Yoon-na
- Lee Mi-sook as Jung Soon-ok
- Kim Soo-yeon as Byun Tae-young
- Yoon Mi-ra as Heo Mal-sook
- Yoon Hee-seok as Byun Tae-shik
- Ji Soo-yeon as Emma Jung
- Lee Kye-in as Mr. Oh
- Nam Kyung-eup as Nam Soo-chul
- Kim Hak-rae as Neighborhood uncle

== Ratings ==
Episode #	Original broadcast date	Average audience share			
Episode #	Original broadcast date	TNmS Ratings		AGB Nielsen	
Episode #	Original broadcast date	Nationwide	Seoul National Capital Area	Nationwide	Seoul National Capital Area
1	December 23, 2013	10.0%	12.0%	10.3%	10.8%
2	December 24, 2013	7.8%	8.4%	8.7%	8.8%
3	December 25, 2013	9.7%	10.0%	10.2%	10.8%
4	December 26, 2013	8.6%	9.3%	9.2%	8.7%
5	December 27, 2013	8.7%	10.0%	9.5%	9.9%
Average		-	-	-	-

== Awards and nominations ==
Year	Award	Category	Recipient	Result
2014	7th Korea Drama Awards	Excellence Award, Actress	Lee Jin	Nominated
2014	MBC Drama Awards	Top Excellence Award, Actor in a Serial Drama	Park Yoon-jae	Nominated
2014	MBC Drama Awards	Top Excellence Award, Actress in a Serial Drama	Lee Jin	Nominated
2014	MBC Drama Awards	Excellence Award, Actress in a Serial Drama	Jo An	Nominated
2014	MBC Drama Awards	Golden Acting Award, Actress	Lee Mi-sook	Won
