= Lee Chung-mi =

South Korean actress (born 1990)

- Born: Lee Chung-mi; 27 August 1990 (age 36); South Korea
- Other name: Lee Cheong-mi
- Education: Hanyang Women's University
- Occupation: Actress
- Years active: 2010–present
- Agent: Glorious Entertainment
- Known for: Dream High 2 Endless Love; Sweet Enemy

Lee Chung-mi is South Korean actress. She is best known for her roles in Endless Love, The Third Charm and Sweet Enemy.

== Filmography ==
=== Television ===
Year	Title	Role	Network	Ref.
2011	Me Too, Flower!		MBC	
2012	Dream High 2	Ga Yeong	KBS	
2014	Endless Love	Hyo Ri	SBS	
2015	Reply 1988	Nam Goong Neul Bo	tvN	
2016	7 First Kisses	Ji Young	Naver TV Cast	
2017	Rebel: Thief Who Stole the People	Han Deok	MBC	
2018	Sweet Enemy	Hwang Geum Sook	SBS	
2018	The Third Charm	Mi Yeong	JTBC	
2018	Player	Yang Hae Joo	KST	
2018	Just Dance		KBS1	
2020	365: Repeat the Year	Kim Se-rin's sister	MBC	
2020	Phoenix 2020	Lee Young-eun	SBS	

=== Film ===
Year	Title	Role	Language	Ref.
2013	My Little Hero	Thunderman member 'Butterfly'	Korean	
2014	Han River	Jo-yeon	Korean	
2014	Compassion	Jeong Ha-na	Korean	
2021	We're Not Good At Parting	Ji-an		
