= Love in Her Bag =

2013 South Korean television series

- Promotional poster
- Also known as: Her Legend; Bag Story
- Hangul: 그녀의 신화
- Hanja: 그女의神話
- RR: Geunyeoui sinhwa
- MR: Kŭnyŏŭi sinhwa
- Genre: Romance, Drama
- Written by: Kim Jung-ah
- Directed by: Lee Seung-ryul
- Starring: Choi Jung-won; Kim Jeong-hoon; Son Eun-seo; Park Yoon-jae
- Music by: Hwang Sang-jun
- Country of origin: South Korea
- Original language: Korean
- No. of episodes: 20

Production
- Executive producers: Jo Joon-hyung; Lee Jang-soo; Yoo Hong-gu
- Producer: Go Jung-ho
- Production location: Korea
- Production company: Logos Film

Original release
- Network: JTBC
- Release: August 5 – October 8, 2013

Love in Her Bag (Korean: 그녀의 신화; RR: Geunyeoui sinhwa; lit. 'Her Myth') is a 2013 South Korean television series starring Choi Jung-won, Kim Jeong-hoon, Son Eun-seo, and Park Yoon-jae. It aired on JTBC from August 5 to October 8, 2013 on Mondays and Tuesdays at 20:45 (KST) for 20 episodes.

== Synopsis ==
Despite her poverty, home abuse from her aunt (who took her in following her mother's death), and lack of education or connections, bright and plucky Eun Jung-soo (Choi Jung-won) works her way up in the luxury handbag industry based on sheer talent alone. She encounters Do Jin-hoo (Kim Jeong-hoon), the smart and handsome chaebol heir of a fashion company, and Kim Seo-hyun (Son Eun-seo) who has to hide her true identity as Eun Kyung-hee, Jung-soo's cousin who, with her mother's help, usurped Jung-soo's place as the adopted daughter of a rich woman, in order to achieve her dreams.

== Cast ==
=== Main ===
- Choi Jung-won as Eun Jung-soo
  - Kim Bo-ra as teenage Jung-soo
  - Kim Soo-hyun as young Jung-soo
- Kim Jeong-hoon as Do Jin-hoo
  - Yong Hong-bin as teenage Jin-hoo
- Son Eun-seo as Kim Seo-hyun / Eun Kyung-hee, Eun Jung-soo's cousin
  - Park So-young as teenage Kyung-hee
  - Shin Soo-yeon as young Kyung-hee
- Park Yoon-jae as Kang Min-ki

=== Supporting ===
- Choi Su-rin as Eun Hye-jung, Eun Jung-soo's mother
- Maeng Sang-hoon as Eun Ki-jung, Eun Jung-soo's uncle
- Jeon Soo-kyeong as Kim Mi-yeon, Eun Jung-soo's aunt
- Jang Tae-sung as Eun Kyung-ho
  - Jung Yoon-seok as young Kyung-ho
- Byun Jung-hye as Yeo Sook-kyung
- Kim Sung-kyum as Do Kyung-chul
- Kim Byung-se as Kim Jong-wook
- Kim Hye-sun as Woo Do-young
- Jeon No-min as Choi Soo-ho
- Lee Yeon-kyung as Jang Yeon-sook
- Shim Eun-jin as Goo So-young
- Jin Ye-sol as Yoo Ah-ra
- Jin Sung as Jegal Yong-sam
- Na Hyun-joo as Go Eun-joo
- Yoon Chae-yi as Song Jin-kyung
- Kang Da-bin as Park Jong-min
- Lee Hee-do as Kim Dae-poong
