= Fatal Promise =

2020 South Korean TV revenge melodrama series

- Promotional poster
- Hangul: 위험한 약속
- Hanja: 危險한 約束
- Lit.: Dangerous Promise
- RR: Wiheomhan yaksok
- MR: Wihŏmhan yaksok
- Genre: Revenge; Melodrama
- Created by: KBS Drama Production
- Written by: Ma Ju-hee
- Directed by: Kim Shin-il
- Starring: Park Ha-na; Go Se-won; Kang Sung-min; Park Young-rin
- Country of origin: South Korea
- Original language: Korean
- No. of episodes: 104 (Note: four-episode extension from the original 100)

Production
- Executive producers: Kim Yong-jin (Mega Monster); Sohn Jae-sung (Mega Monster); Moon Jun-ha (KBS Drama Production)
- Producers: Baek Sung-min; Lee Min-soo
- Camera setup: Single-camera
- Running time: 40 minutes
- Production company: Mega Monster

Original release
- Network: KBS2
- Release: March 30 – August 28, 2020

Fatal Promise (Korean: 위험한 약속) is a 2020 South Korean television series starring Park Ha-na, Go Se-won, Kang Sung-min and Park Young-rin. The Mega Monster-produced series, directed by Kim Shin-il and written by Ma Ju-hee, revolves around the revenge of a girl who was unjustly sacrificed by a man to save his family in exchange for injustice and compromise to reality. The daily drama was premiered on KBS2 on March 30, 2020 and aired every weekday at 19:50 (KST) till August 28, 2020.

== Synopsis ==
The drama is a fierce sensibility melodrama. Cha Eun-dong, an upright citizen who has stood up against injustice. Coming from humble beginnings, she has also practiced patience. Unfortunately one day her family is cast into turbulence after she is betrayed by the one person she confides in. Brutally deceived, she is reborn by the burning fire of vengeance as she swears retribution. In contrast, Kang Tae-in has always been a rational man of morals who has always kept his word. Starting as a lowly employee to now the chairman of F Sports Group, he has only depended on himself for a better life. The one promise he has broken was the one he made to Eun Dong, after having to choose between her and his chance for opulence. The two people meet again seven years later.

== Cast and characters ==
The cast and characters of the series are:

Main

- Park Ha-na as Cha Eun-dong
  - Yoo Chae-yeon as child Cha Eun-dong

She is the daughter of a security worker who was a former Catholic priest who lost everything in the face of injustice. It was a 'trouble maker' that unintentionally caused a disturbance over the overflowing sense of justice from an early age.

- Go Se-won as Kang Tae-in

F-Sports Group director who is cold-hearted. A man who compromised with reality for his family. Grown up as the son of an ordinary family, he rose from the F-Sports group's lower end staff to executive positions with only one skill. He has even received the credentials of the chairman with his cool reason and thorough judgment. However, Choi Joon-hyuk's strategy leads to being driven to the end of the cliff, and eventually, he abandons his promise with Cha Eun-dong and compromises with reality. Kang Tae-in, suffering from guilt, has never forgotten her. Seven years later, she appears in front of him in anger, and the sealed Pandora's box opens.

- Kang Sung-min as Choi Jun-hyuk

F Sports Group Legal Affairs Team Leader. Son of Juran, Chairman of the Korean Hospital Medical Foundation, who shook everyone's lives with dangerous transactions. F Sports Group Chairman Kwang-Hoon-han is a family. However, his credibility is toward his college classmate Kang Tae-in, and his case with him is on the brink of confrontation. Then, in the wake of an incident, he makes a dangerous proposal that cannot be resisted to Kang Tae-in's fiancée Oh Hye-won, which completely transforms the lives of three people Cha Eun-dong, Kang Tae-in, and Oh Hye-won.

- Park Young-rin as Oh Hye-won

Korea Hospital Thoracic and Cardiovascular Surgeon and fiancée of Kang Tae-in, a person who is shaken in front of desire at every moment. She promised to marry Kang Tae-in, who had been a lover since college. Born in a poor family. She was about to take office as a thoracic surgeon, but she is in danger of losing everything she had accumulated unjustly. And at the end of the cliff, Choi Jun-hyuk proposes a risky deal, and there is a conflict between love and ambition.

- Lee Chang-wook as Han Ji-hoon
  - Ki Eun-yoo as child Han Ji-hoon

Son of F Sports Group Chairman/ Son of Geum Soo-jeo, Chairman of F Sports Group, who has consistently pure love. He was born with a silver spoon and grew up without any shortcomings, but he was Han-Liang who caused all kinds of accidents when he was in school due to resentment and wounds toward his father. His life, which couldn't be found at all as serious, completely changes when he meets Cha Eun-dong. Whenever it was difficult, he became the only resting place for her, and he later confronts Kang Tae-in fiercely over Cha Eun-dong.

=== Supporting ===
==== People around Cha Eun-dong ====
- Lee Dae-yeon as Cha Man-jong, Cha Eun-dong father, a former priest, he got a job as a security officer at the hospital where Hye-won works, and he faced a mysterious accident there. (Special appearance)
- Yoo Jun-seo as Cha Eun-chan, Eun-dong's younger brother.
- Yu Ji-yeon as Kong Young-sim, Eun-dong's close bloody sister, girlfriend of Bong Seok-gu
- Hyun Cheol-ho as Bong Seok-gu, due to the former lawyer Lee Chang-wook, they live as a family and calls Eun-dong his sister-in-law.

==== People around Kang Tae-in ====
Actor	Role	Profile
Kang Shin-il	Kang Il-seop	Kang Tae-in's father always feels guilty for his son and his wife. He saw his son running around for the company, which made his life tired and lonely and felt sad.
Lee Kan-hee	Yeon Doo-sim	Kang Tae-in's mother, a kind wife dedicated to her family, a woman who has forgotten her first love. Feeling the trivial happy life one day, first love appeared in front of her again.
Kim Jung-woon	Lee Chang-wook	Kang Tae-in's friend, a lawyer

==== People around Han Ji-hoon ====
Actor	Role	Profile
Kil Yong-woo	Han Kwang-hoon	Han Ji-hoon's father, chairman of F Sports Group as a model entrepreneur who knows how to give back to society. The only drinking friend who is open to him is not his son Ji-hoon or his wife, but Kang Tae-in, a trusted employee.
Kim Hye-ji	Han Seo-joo	Han Ji-hoon's sister, Choi Myung-hee's daughter, who brought her to Han after remarrying. From the moment she entered the house, she tried to be loved by Chairman Han, but for Chairman Han, his real son, Ji-hoon, was always first.
Kim Na-woon	Choi Myung-hee	Han Ji-hoon's mother, Chairman Choi's sister, 20 years ago, her brother Choi Young-guk helped her to rejoin with Chairman Han, who had both financial strength and ability.

==== People around Oh Hye-won ====
- Yoon Bok-in as Go Jae-sook - Hye-won's mother

== Original soundtrack ==
Fatal Promise

Soundtrack album by Various Artists
- Released: 22 August 2020
- Genre: Soundtrack
- Languages: Korean; English
- Label: Danal Entertainment

=== Part 1 ===
Released on April 3, 2020
No.	Title	Lyrics	Music	Artist	Length
1.	"Confession" (이우)	Kang Hyun-min	Kang Hyun-min	Lee Woo	3:53
2.	"Confession (Inst.)"	Kang Hyun-min	Kang Hyun-min	Lee Woo	3:53
Total length:					7:46

=== Part 2 ===
Released on April 11, 2020
No.	Title	Lyrics	Music	Artist	Length
1.	"Three letters of your name" (숙희)	winning unbeaten	winning unbeaten	Sookhee	3:51
2.	"Three letters of your name (Inst.)"	Kang Hyun-min	Kang Hyun-min	Sookhee	3:51
Total length:					7:42

=== Part 3 ===
Released on April 18, 2020
No.	Title	Lyrics	Music	Artist	Length
1.	"If we hadn't known, like this" (더 데이지)	Kim Jin-woo	Kim Jin-woo	The Daisy	3:22
2.	"If we hadn't known, like this (Inst.)"	Kim Jin-woo	Kim Jin-woo	The Daisy	3:22
Total length:					6:44

=== Part 4 ===
Released on April 25, 2020
No.	Title	Lyrics	Music	Artist	Length
1.	"I regret it" (란)	Victory and Undefeated, Jamie, Jinwoo Kim	Undefeated, Jamie, Kim Jin-woo	RAN	3:32
2.	"I regret it (Inst.)"	Victory and Undefeated, Jamie, Jinwoo Kim	Undefeated, Jamie, Kim Jin-woo	RAN	3:32
Total length:					7:04

== Ratings ==
Average TV viewership ratings°(Analysis criteria: 13 regions nationwide, households, unit:%)°°(Analysis criteria: metropolitan area, household, unit:%)
Ep.	Original broadcast	Average audience share (Nielsen Korea)		TNmS ratings
Ep.	Original broadcast	°Nationwide	°°Seoul	Nationwide
1	2020/03/30	12.5%	10.5%	16.4%
2	2020/03/31	12.2%	10.2%	16.4%
3	2020/04/01	12.4%	10.5%	16.6%
4	2020/04/02	11.7%	9.9%	16.1%
5	2020/04/03	12.3%	10.9%	16.4%
6	2020/04/06	12.2%	10.4%	16.7%
7	2020/04/07	13.1%	11.3%	17.6%
8	2020/04/08	13.0%	11.4%	17.8%
9	2020/04/09	13.2%	11.2%	16.0%
10	2020/04/10	12.5%	10.6%	16.2%
11	2020/04/13	12.2%	11.0%	16.8%
12	2020/04/14	13.8%	12.7%	16.9%
13	2020/04/15	12.2%	11.0%	
14	2020/04/16	12.9%	10.9%	17.3%
15	2020/04/17	14.4%	13.3%	17.7%
16	2020/04/20	13.3%	12.0%	16.3%
17	2020/04/21	13.8%	11.8%	17.0%
18	2020/04/22	13.6%	11.9%	17.2%
19	2020/04/23	13.4%	12.1%	15.7%
20	2020/04/24	13.1%	11.7%	17.2%
21	2020/04/27	13.3%	11.9%	17.0%
22	2020/04/28	13.3%	12.3%	17.8%
23	2020/04/29	12.7%	11.7%	17.0%
24	2020/04/30	12.6%	11.3%	15.5%
25	2020/05/01	12.2%	10.3%	15.8%
26	2020/05/04	12.4%	11.3%	15.1%
27	2020/05/05	13.0%	12.0%	16.6%
28	2020/05/06	12.8%	11.0%	16.2%
29	2020/05/07	13.0%	11.5%	15.9%
30	2020/05/08	11.4%	10.1%	15.0%
31	2020/05/11	13.0%	11.8%	16.2%
32	2020/05/12	12.2%	11.0%	16.6%
33	2020/05/13	12.7%	10.8%	16.4%
34	2020/05/14	12.8%	11.5%	16.3%
35	2020/05/18	13.8%	12.5%	17.2%
36	2020/05/19	13.2%	11.6%	16.5%
37	2020/05/20	12.1%	10.2%	16.7%
38	2020/05/21	12.3%	10.9%	15.6%
39	2020/05/22	12.4%	11.7%	16.1%
40	2020/05/25	14.3%	13.0%	16.5%
41	2020/05/26	14.0%	13.2%	18.0%
42	2020/05/27	13.2%	11.5%	16.0%
43	2020/05/28	12.8%	11.6%	16.2%
44	2020/06/01	12.7%	11.3%	15.5%
45	2020/06/02	14.0%	12.8%	16.7%
46	2020/06/03	12.8%	11.5%	15.7%
47	2020/06/04	13.3%	12.2%	16.3%
48	2020/06/08	13.3%	12.4%	14.7%
49	2020/06/09	13.1%	11.5%	15.2%
50	2020/06/10	13.8%	12.6%	17.4%
51	2020/06/11	13.4%	12.5%	16.2%
52	2020/06/12	13.7%	12.8%	17.3%
53	2020/06/15	13.2%	12.3%	15.8%
54	2020/06/17	12.8%	11.3%	15.8%
55	2020/06/18	14.2%	13.2%	17.2%
56	2020/06/19	12.2%	11.8%	14.9%
57	2020/06/22	12.9%	11.9%	16.2%
58	2020/06/23	13.6%	12.5%	16.1%
59	2020/06/24	15.2%	14.3%	18.2%
60	2020/06/25	14.9%	13.7%	18.0%
61	2020/06/26	12.9%	12.1%	15.3%
62	2020/06/29	15.2%	13.4%	18.8%
63	2020/06/30	15.1%	14.0%	18.3%
64	2020/07/01	13.8%	12.1%	15.8%
65	2020/07/02	13.9%	11.9%	17.1%
66	2020/07/03	14.2%	11.9%	18.0%
67	2020/07/06	14.6%	13.3%	18.1%
68	2020/07/07	14.5%	13.4%	17.6%
69	2020/07/08	13.5%	11.8%	16.8%
70	2020/07/09	13.9%	12.6%	17.7%
71	2020/07/10	14.6%	12.9%	16.8%
72	2020/07/13	15.2%	13.4%	18.7%
73	2020/07/14	14.8%	12.3%	17.7%
74	2020/07/15	14.6%	12.9%	17.6%
75	2020/07/16	14.4%	13.2%	16.7%
76	2020/07/17	14.1%	12.5%	17.7%
77	2020/07/20	14.7%	13.0%	18.4%
78	2020/07/21	15.3%	13.7%	17.9%
79	2020/07/22	15.8%	13.2%	19.6%
80	2020/07/23	16.4%	15.1%	21.2%
81	2020/07/24	14.5%	12.1%	18.8%
82	2020/07/27	16.0%	13.9%	21.1%
83	2020/07/28	15.8%	13.7%	19.7%
84	2020/07/29	14.9%	13.4%	19.3%
85	2020/07/30	14.7%	12.9%	19.0%
86	2020/08/03	15.5%	14.5%	18.8%
87	2020/08/04	14.8%	13.6%	18.2%
88	2020/08/05	14.6%	13.0%	17.7%
89	2020/08/06	14.7%	12.7%	17.5%
90	2020/08/07	14.6%	12.0%	18.8%
91	2020/08/10	16.5%	14.8%	19.8%
92	2020/08/11	15.9%	13.8%	19.2%
93	2020/08/12	15.1%	13.6%	18.3%
94	2020/08/13	14.7%	13.4%	18.9%
95	2020/08/14	14.3%	12.9%	17.7%
96	2020/08/17	15.0%	13.9%	17.2%
97	2020/08/18	15.1%	13.5%	17.6%
98	2020/08/19	15.1%	13.5%	18.1%
99	2020/08/20	15.1%	14.4%	17.8%
100	2020/08/24	15.6%	14.9%	19.2%
101	2020/08/25	14.9%	13.7%	18.7%
102	2020/08/26	5.4%	4.8%	19.3%
103	2020/08/27	15.3%	14.1%	18.2%
104	2020/08/28	15.6%	13.7%	17.7%
Average ratings		13.73%	12.26%	17.22%
The blue numbers represent the lowest ratings and the red numbers represent the highest ratings.; N/A denotes that the rating is not known.

== Awards and nominations ==
Year	Award	Category	Nominee	Result	Ref.
2020	34th KBS Drama Awards	Excellence Award, Actress in a Daily Drama	Park Ha-na	Won	
2020	34th KBS Drama Awards	Excellence Award, Actor in a Daily Drama	Go Se-won	Nominated	
2020	34th KBS Drama Awards	Excellence Award, Actor in a Daily Drama	Kang Sung-min	Nominated	
