= Graceful Family =

2019 South Korean television series

- Promotional poster
- Also known as: Elegant Family
- Hangul: 우아한 가
- Hanja: 優雅한 家
- RR: Uahan ga
- MR: Uahan ka
- Genre: Mystery; Suspense; Melodrama
- Written by: Kwon Min-Soo
- Directed by: Han Chul-Soo
- Starring: Im Soo-hyang; Lee Jang-woo; Shin Soo-yeon; Bae Jong-ok
- Composer: Kim Jong Chun (김종천)
- Country of origin: South Korea
- Original language: Korean
- No. of episodes: 16

Production
- Executive producers: Keom Ja-Eun; Kim Bong-Soo
- Producers: Han Cheol-Soo; Yuk Jeong-Yong; Lee Kwon-Young; Kim Mi-Jin
- Camera setup: Single-camera
- Running time: 65–78 minutes; 105 minutes (Finale)
- Production company: Samhwa Networks

Original release
- Network: MBN; Dramax
- Release: August 21 – October 17, 2019

Graceful Family (Korean: 우아한 가; RR: Uahan ga) is a 2019 South Korean television series starring Im Soo-hyang, Lee Jang-woo, and Bae Jong-ok. It aired on Wednesdays and Thursdays at 23:00 (KST) of MBN and Dramax from August 21 to October 17, 2019.

Besides receiving critical acclaim, Graceful Family became the highest-rated drama in MBN network history at the time of its run, and currently is ranked as the second-highest rated drama of the network, after being surpassed by Bossam: Steal the Fate.

== Synopsis ==
Mo Seok-hee (Im Soo-hyang) is the only daughter of the MC Group, a large chaebol (conglomerate). Her grandfather is the founder and majority shareholder of the chaebol and her father, Mo Cheol-hee, is the President. 15 years ago, as a young teenager, Seok-hee was forced by her father to move to the United States after her mother was murdered.

Now, 15 years later, Seok-hee has become a beautiful and intelligent woman with a strong personality. She acts tough and arrogant, but hides her kindness and suffering over her mother's death. She comes back to Korea after learning that her grandfather is in a coma and is hospitalized in Seoul in a facility owned by MC Group, evading her family's efforts to prevent her return.

Heo Yoon-do (Lee Jang-woo) is a lawyer with no office and only a few small clients. He works by helping the residents of his neighborhood in a makeshift office at his adoptive father's restaurant. He is diligent and ethical.

Driving from the airport, Seok-hee meets Yoon-do at a police station. After a prickly first meeting, Seok-hee sees something in Yoon-do and hires him as her lawyer, and he starts working for the TOP Team at MC Group. She finds the Mo family dysfunctional, with the President's second wife (previously his mistress) jockeying for a position with his latest mistress, a popular but fading actress (and their young son) all living in the family compound. Also living in the compound are two sons with the second wife, the older one, Mo Wan-soo, an unsuccessful film director, more interested in fast cars and wine, and the younger one, Mo Wan-joon, who is being groomed as the eventual successor, secretly hiding his transgender identity and abusing his wife (their marriage is only for show and has remained unconsummated).

The TOP Team manages the affairs of the Mo family. The TOP Team is led by Han Je-gook (Bae Jong-ok), a former judge who had previously been known to be fair and incorruptible. However, many years ago, after ruling against the MC Group in a case, in retaliation she was transferred to a court in a rural area. Disappointed, she agreed to work for the MC Group. Je-kook becomes an ambitious and treacherous woman who wants to control MC Group and exercise extensive influence over South Korean politics and business. At TOP, Je-kook works to cover up immoral or illegal (or in the case of the transgender son, simply embarrassing) behavior by the Mo family, and uncover the immoral and illegal secrets of powerful and wealthy Korean people, to blackmail or destroy them.

Coincidentally, Seok-hee and Yoon-do discover that they have a connection. Yoon-do's mother, a housekeeper for the Mo family 15 years ago, had been convicted of murdering Seok-hee's mother. Convinced that Yoon-do's mother was framed, they join forces to reveal the truth behind Seok-hee's mother's death, and the secrets that Je-kook and TOP hide as well as to help Seok-hee gain her rightful place in MC Group. They are helped by an editor and a reporter of a small newspaper and a friendly police officer but must struggle against the power and long reach of TOP. Along the way to seek justice, the group finds allies from the most unexpected places.

Episode	Summary
1	After 15 years in the US, Seok-hee dodges the security blanket around her and managed to fly back to Korea. After being apprehended during a vehicle incident, she meets Yoon-do in a police precinct and later hires him as her lawyer. Dodging MC Group's security, Seok-hee heads to the hospital to visit his sick grandfather, Mo Wang-Pyo.
2	Seok-hee went on a blind date with the son of prosecutor Joo Heong-Il, one of those involved in the conspiracy from 15 years ago. Mad from Seok-hee's rejection, Joo Tae-hyeong vowed to get back at her. Seok-hee was stopped and arrested by the prosecutor's office after a packet of marijuana was slipped in her bag.
3	Seok-hee tells Yoon-do that she was set up by TOP through Joo Tae-hyeong. Yoon-do advised her that cooperating with authorities is her best option but she was adamant that the only way she would be released is to prove her innocence. Meanwhile, Yoon-do works as an intern for TOP.
4	Yoon-do uncovers irrefutable proof that somebody has slipped drugs in Seok-hee's bag while she was shopping for clothes. Yoon-do confronts Tae-hyeong with this evidence leading to Seok-hee's release.
5	Mo Wang-Pyo surprised everybody in the family when he was wheeled into the dining hall after 15 years of being in a coma. He announced the next successor of the MC Group. Yoon-do finally meets her mother in prison after 15 years of being declined during his visits.
6	Seok-hee's appointment as the new CEO is in the agenda during the next shareholders' meeting. TOP, in cahoot with the incumbent Chairman Mo Cheol-hee, is working out ways to prevent this from happening. On her way to the shareholder meeting, Seok-hee was stopped by the police for a test on sobriety. The test turns positive for alcohol, her license was suspended for DUI, and she missed the board meeting.
9	Ha Yeong-seo plots to kick Choi Na-Ri out of the house. With the help of TOP's fabrication of lies, a compromising video was found which was used to blackmail Na-Ri. Eventually, Na-Ri agreed to leave the family house with her son, Mo Seo-jin. Through Yeong-seo's instigation, the mother and son were flown to Laos.
10	TOP fabricates an affair between Baek Soo-jin and the chef. Pictures taken was used to force her to accept a divorce with no alimony. With the help of Seok-hee, Soo-jin made a comeback and forced a more favorable counter-negotiation with TOP.
11	The nature of Mo Wan-joon's secret "affair" is finally revealed. Heo Yoon-do's past identity and additional details on what happened 15 years ago is revealed via a CCTV footage that Reporter Kim has kept all this time.
12	An old investigation report from 15 years back resurfaced. A repentant accomplice is back with the intent of paying for past sins. A confrontation with the previous prosecutor Joo Hyeong-il. Meanwhile, Mo Cheol-hee is now contemplating Mo Wan-soo as MC Group's successor.
13	After Director Han learns that Yoon-do is Tae-ho, TOP trumped up made-up charges of embezzlement of funds, which led to the arrest of Yoon-do by the prosecutor's office. TOP also messed up the lives of Detective Oh, Reporter Kim, and Yoon-do's adopted father. The group hatches a plan for Yoon-do's release within 48 hours and how to get back at Director Han.
14	The forces of good are in the works trying to put the villains to justice, and it is a tough fight. TOP makes public Prosecutor Joo Hyeong-il's criminal acts to overshadow the news on Yoon-do's retrial request. Mo Seok-hee learns the truth about her real father.
15	Mo Seok-hee uses her new position to right the wrongs committed by TOP and members of her family. But, Director Han continues to find ways to install Mo Wan-joon as the new CEO. During the shareholder's meeting aiming to approve Wan-joon as the new heir, a surprise guest turned the tables around. Mo Wan-soo decided the punishment for himself.
16	Those who committed a crime were prosecuted and handed out their sentences. Yoon-do was granted a retrial and Im Soon found innocent and released. Mo Seok-hee decides to take law and handed out MC Group's management rights to a professional. TOP is now a law firm supporting MC and is on the right side of law.

== Cast ==
=== Main ===
- Im Soo-hyang as Mo Seok-hee
  - Shin Soo-yeon as young Mo Seok-hee
- Lee Jang-woo as Heo Yoon-do/Tae-Ho
- Bae Jong-ok as Han Je-gook

=== Supporting ===
- Jung Won-joong as Mo Cheol-hee, President of MC Group
- Moon Hee-kyung as Ha Yeong-seo, Mo Cheol-hee's former mistress and now second wife who is the head of his household
- Lee Kyu-han as Mo Wan-soo
- Kim Jin-woo as Mo Wan-joon
- Gong Hyun-joo as Baek Soo-jin
- Jeon Jin-seo as Mo Seo-jin
- Jung Hye-in as Lee Kyung-ah

=== Others ===
- Jun Gook-hwan as Mo Wang-pyo, Seok-hee's grandfather
- Oh Seung-eun as Choi Na-ri
- Park Hyun-sook as Jeong Yoon-sook
- Park Hye-na as Ahn Jae-rim
- Son Jin-hwan as Lawyer Yoon
- Park Sang-myun as Heo Jang-soo
- Jo Kyung-sook as Im Soon
- Na In-gyoo as Detective Oh
- Jang Seo-kyung as Go Eun-ji
- Kim Chul-ki as Yoon Sang-won
- Kwon Hyuk-hyun as Kwon Joon-hyeok
- Park Young-rin as Hwang Bo-joo-young
- Park Chul-min as Kim Boo-gi
- Kim Yoon-seo as Oh Gwang-mi
- Jung Ho-bin as Joo Hyeong-il
- Hyun Woo-sung as Joo Tae-hyeong
- Moon Sook as "Milk Witch" (Loan shark) (Ep. 4, 16)

== Reception ==
Graceful Family premiered with high viewership for MBN network and attracted media attention in Korea and internationally. The Maeil Business Newspaper reported the drama was sold to broadcasters in Malaysia, Indonesia, the Philippines, Taiwan, Hong Kong, Thailand, Vietnam, Myanmar and North and South America due to the quality performances of its actors and actresses, script and production of the drama.

== Viewership ==
Graceful Family : South Korea viewers per episode (millions)

Season	Episode number																Average
Season	1	2	3	4	5	6	7	8	9	10	11	12	13	14	15	16	Average
1	TBD	TBD	0.570	0.575	0.792	TBD	0.771	0.722	0.999	1.001	1.368	1.356	1.401	1.373	1.557	1.685	N/A

Source: Audience measurement performed nationwide by Nielsen Media Research.

Average TV viewership ratings
Ep.	Original broadcast date	Average audience share (AGB Nielsen)	
Ep.	Original broadcast date	Nationwide	Seoul
1	August 21, 2019	2.689% (NR)	—N/a
2	August 22, 2019	1.828% (NR)	—N/a
3	August 28, 2019	2.720% (NR)	—N/a
4	August 29, 2019	2.899% (NR)	—N/a
5	September 4, 2019	3.700% (6th)	3.408% (8th)
6	September 5, 2019	2.074% (NR)	—N/a
7	September 18, 2019	4.322% (4th)	4.319% (3rd)
8	September 19, 2019	3.653% (NR)	3.784% (8th)
9	September 25, 2019	5.205% (2nd)	5.608% (1st)
10	September 26, 2019	5.284% (2nd)	5.585% (2nd)
11	October 2, 2019	7.125% (1st)	7.432% (1st)
12	October 3, 2019	6.556% (2nd)	6.945% (1st)
13	October 9, 2019	7.316% (1st)	7.808% (1st)
14	October 10, 2019	6.974% (1st)	7.559% (1st)
15	October 16, 2019	7.981% (1st)	8.405% (1st)
16	October 17, 2019	8.478% (1st)	8.305% (1st)
Average		4.925%	— (Note: Due to some ratings not recorded, the exact average rating is unknown.)
In this table below, the blue numbers represent the lowest ratings and the red numbers represent the highest ratings.; This series airs on a cable channel/pay TV which normally has a relatively smaller audience compared to free-to-air TV/public broadcasters (KBS, SBS, MBC and EBS).; NR denotes that the series did not rank in the top 20 daily programs on that date.; N/A denotes that the rating is not known.
