= Yoon Mi-ra =

South Korean actress (born 1951)

- Born: December 18, 1951 (age 74); Jeongeup, South Korea
- Occupation: Actress

Korean name
- Hangul: 윤미라
- RR: Yun Mira
- MR: Yun Mira

Yoon Mi-ra (Korean: 윤미라; born December 18, 1951) is a South Korean actress.

== Filmography ==
=== Film ===
Year	Title	Role
1970	The Invincible of the Far East	
1970	I'll Say Goodbye	
1970	Gu Bong-seo's Marriage Plan	
1970	Double-edged Sword	
1970	Girls from Eight Provinces	
1970	Quick as Lightning	
1970	Operation Tokyo Expo '70	
1972	Ok-Nyeo's Resentment	
1972	Resentment of Daughter-in-law	
1973	Biwon	
1973	A She-Sailor	
1973	Two Faces in Sunset	
1974	The Tigress	
1974	Parade of Wives	
1974	Confession of My Life	
1975	A Troupe of Strolling Actors	
1975	The Fool Yong-chil	
1975	Gold Madam	
1976	Family	
1976	I Am Looking for a Wife	
1976	Three Sisters	
1976	Woman In Jail	
1976	Great Escape of Women Prisoners	
1976	Young City	
1976	Five Commandments	
1976	Yui Hyeol Mun, Righteous Martial Party	
1977	Mission of Canon-Chungjin	
1977	Mister O (Mister Zero)	
1978	The Old Manor	
1978	Under the Sky With No Mother (Sequel)	
1978	Woman Who Brought the Storm	
1978	Festival of the Chicks	
1978	The Sunny Side of Love	
1978	Floating Plants	
1980	This Pain of the Woman	
1981	The Man Made to Cry By a Woman	
1981	On the Road	
2002	Surprise (aka Surprise Party)	
2011	Sunny	Past picture (cameo)

=== Television series ===
Year	Title	Role	Network
1990	Love on a Jujube Tree	Doo Shim	KBS
1994	The Moon of Seoul	Ok-hee	MBC
1994	Partner	Jap-sun	MBC
1995	Blowing of the Wind	Kim Mal-soon	KBS2
1996	First Love	Lee Hyo-kyung's mother	KBS2
1997	Because I Really	Hong Geum-pyo	KBS1
1997	Wedding Dress		KBS2
1998	KBS TV Novel: "Eun-ah's Daughter"		KBS1
1999	You Don't Know My Mind	Na Do-bong	MBC
2000	Say It with Your Eyes	In-kyung's aunt	MBC
2000	More Than Words Can Say	Yeo Sang-sook	KBS1
2001	The Rules of Marriage	Park Dal-ja	MBC
2001	Way of Living: Couple	Song Jung-hee	SBS
2002	Whenever the Heart Beats	Hwang Su-im	KBS2
2002	The Woman	Yang Dong-hee	SBS
2003	Wife	Geum Chon-chak	KBS2
2003	Escape from Unemployment	Jo Chang-sook	SBS
2003	Pretty Woman	Baek Keum-rye	MBC
2004	Terms of Endearment	Lee Hyung-sil	KBS2
2005	Be Strong, Geum-soon!	Oh Mi-ja	MBC
2005	That Woman	Han Sun-nyeo	SBS
2006	Famous Princesses	Ban Chin-soon	KBS2
2006	Queen of the Game	Jang Su-ja	SBS
2007	Que Sera, Sera	Yoon Jung-im	MBC
2007	Winter Bird	Ms. Lee	MBC
2007	Cannot Hate You	Jung Soon-im	SBS
2008	Chunja's Special Day	Heo Young-ae	MBC
2008	Temptation of Wife	Yoon Mi-ja	SBS
2009	My Too Perfect Sons	Bae Ok-hee	KBS2
2010	Happiness in the Wind	Yoon Sun-hee	KBS1
2011	Believe in Love	Yoon Hwa-young	KBS2
2011	War of the Roses	Mrs. Yoo	SBS
2012	Tasty Life	Han Bong-soon	SBS
2012	Can't Live Without You	Lee Mi-ja	MBC
2013	Your Lady	Park Soon-ja	SBS
2013	Passionate Love	Jang Bok-hee	SBS
2013	Shining Romance	Heo Mal-sook	MBC
2014	The Greatest Marriage	Jeon Ryeo-ja	TV Chosun
2015	My Heart Twinkle Twinkle	Lee Mal-sook	SBS
2015	My Mom	Mrs. Jang	MBC
2016	Father, I'll Take Care of You	Han Ae-Ri	MBC
2017	Reunited Worlds	Lady Doh	SBS
2018	I Am the Mother Too	Lim Eun-ja	SBS
2021	Amor Fati	Ko Sang-hye	SBS
2023–2024	Live Your Own Life	Lee Seon-soon, Hyo-sim's mother	KBS2

== Awards and nominations ==
Year	Award	Category	Nominated work	Result
1997	KBS Drama Awards	Top Excellence Award, Actress	Because I Really	Won
2006	KBS Drama Awards	Best Supporting Actress	Famous Princesses	Nominated
2009	KBS Drama Awards	Top Excellence Award, Actress	My Too Perfect Sons	Nominated
