= Your Lady =

- Promotional poster
- Also known as: Your Woman
- Genre: Romance; Melodrama; Family
- Written by: Lee Do-young
- Directed by: Jung Hyo
- Starring: Lee Yu-ri; Park Yoon-jae; Im Ho; Park Young-rin; Lee Byung-wook
- Country of origin: South Korea
- Original language: Korean
- No. of episodes: 120

Production
- Executive producer: Lee Hyun-jik
- Producer: Park Yong-soon
- Production location: Korea
- Running time: Mondays to Fridays at 08:30 (KST)

Original release
- Network: Seoul Broadcasting System
- Release: 18 February – 2 August 2013

Your Lady (Korean: 당신의 여자; RR: Dangsinui yeoja; also known as Your Woman) is a 2013 South Korean television series starring Lee Yu-ri, Park Yoon-jae, Im Ho, Park Young-rin and Lee Byung-wook. The morning melodrama aired on SBS from February 18 to August 2, 2013, on Mondays to Fridays at 8:30 a.m. for 120 episodes.

== Cast ==
=== Main characters ===
- Lee Yu-ri as Lee Eun-soo/Oh Yoo-jung
- Park Yoon-jae as Kang Jung-hoon
- Im Ho as Na Jin-gu
- Park Young-rin as Min Se-yeon
  - Lee Young-eun as young Min Se-yeon
- Lee Byung-wook as Min Dong-yeon

=== Supporting characters ===
- Jung Han-yong as Kang Man-bok
- Lee Mi-young as Ma Pal-soon
- Noh Hyun-hee as Ma Dong-hee
- Yoon Mi-ra as Park Soon-ja
- Kim Min-chan as Na Dae-gu
- Jeon Hyeon-seok as Na Joon-hee
- Lee Jin-ah as Lee Kyeong-seon
- Yoo Ha-joon as Ji Hyeon-woo
- Kang Ji-woo as So-ra
- Kang Suk-jung as Hwang Jae-yeol
- Jung Moon-sung as Kim Tae-seong
- Lee Ji-hye as Manager Yang
- Kim Ha-yoo as Eun-soo
- Ham Jin-sung as Tae-seong's subordinate
