= Jin Ye-sol =

South Korean actress

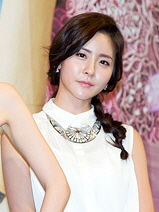
- Jin in 2012
- Born: September 24, 1985 (age 41); Seoul, South Korea
- Other name: Chin Ye-sol
- Education: Myongji University – Theater and Film
- Occupation: Actress
- Years active: 2009–present
- Agent: Hunus Entertainment
- Height: 5 ft 5 in (1.65 m)
- Relatives: Sunday (younger sister)

Korean name
- Hangul: 진예솔
- RR: Jin Yesol
- MR: Chin Yesol

Jin Ye-sol (Korean: 진예솔; born September 24, 1985) is a South Korean actress. She's also the brand ambassador for My Cherie Closet (MCC).

== Filmography ==
=== Television series ===
Year	Title	Role	Ref.
2009	Temptation of an Angel	Shin Hyun-ji	
2009–2010	Loving You a Thousand Times	Park Soo-jeong	
2010	OB & GY	Soo-ah	
2010–2011	Pure Pumpkin Flower	Kang Joon-seon's secretary	
2011	New Tales of Gisaeng	Jin Joo-ah	
2011	49 Days	Ma Soon-jeong	
2012	Queen and I	Yoon-wol	
2012	It Was Love	Joo Kyung-eun	
2012–2013	Can We Get Married?	Han Chae-young	
2013	Love in Her Bag	Yoo Ah-ra	
2014	A Witch's Love	Jung Young-chae (cameo)	
2014–2015	Birth of a Beauty	Lee Min-young	
2015	Great First Wives	Jo Soo-jeong	
2016	Monster	Park So-hee	
2016	You Are a Gift	Kang Se-ra	
2016	Good People	Seok Ji-wan's blind date (cameo)	
2017	The Rebel	Nan-hyang	
2017	Return of Fortunate Bok	Shin Ye-won / Shin Yoo-jin	
2018	Welcome to Waikiki	Kwon Hye-jin (cameo, ep. 5)	
2018	The Undateables	Han Ye-ri	
2019–2020	It's My Life	Jung Jin-ah	
2020–2021	My Wonderful Life	Go Sang-ah	
2022	Today's Webtoon	Ji Han-seul	

=== Music video appearances ===
Year	Title	Artist
2010	"Raining" (비오니까)	Psy
2010	"You Know" (알잖아)	Hyeryung
2010	"Because of Woman" (여자이니까)	J-Cera

== Awards and nominations ==
Year	Award	Category	Nominated work	Result
2015	MBC Drama Awards	Best Supporting Actress in a Serial Drama	Great First Wives	Nominated
