= Tasty Life =

South Korean television series

- Official poster
- Also known as: Delicious Life
- Genre: Family; Comedy; Romance
- Written by: Kim Jung-eun
- Directed by: Woon Goon-il
- Starring: Im Chae-moo; Yoon Jung-hee; Ryu Hyun-kyung; Yoo Da-in; Lee Hye-ri
- Country of origin: South Korea
- Original language: Korean
- No. of episodes: 39

Production
- Executive producer: Park Hyung-ki
- Producers: Kim Kwang-soo; Lee Sung-hoon
- Production location: Korea
- Running time: 70 minutes
- Production company: JS Pictures

Original release
- Network: SBS TV
- Release: 28 April – 23 September 2012

Tasty Life (Korean: 맛있는 인생; RR: Masinneun insaeng) is a 2012 South Korean television series starring Im Chae-moo, Yoon Jung-hee, Ryu Hyun-kyung, Yoo Da-in and Lee Hye-ri. The series written by Kim Jung-eun and directed by Woon Goon-il is about four daughters of a wealthy father, who fall in love, marry, and go through the ups and downs in life. It aired on SBS TV from April 28 to September 23, 2012 on Saturdays and Sundays at 20:40 for 39 episodes.

== Plot ==
Jang Shin-jo was once a police detective, but has now switched from carrying a gun to wielding a kitchen knife as a restaurant owner. He is also an adoring father with four daughters.

== Cast ==
- Im Chae-moo as Jang Shin-jo
- Yoon Jung-hee as Jang Seung-joo
- Ryu Hyun-kyung as Jang Jung-hyun
- Yoo Da-in as Jang Joo-hyun
- Lee Hye-ri as Jang Mi-hyun

Han Bong-soon's family

- Yoon Mi-ra as Han Bong-soon
- Ye Ji-won as Oh Jin-joo
- Lee Mid-eum as Oh Bong

Choi In-goo's family

- Park Geun-hyung as Choi In-goo
- Won Jong-rye - Hwang Geum-sook
- Choi Won-young as Kang In-chul
- Yoo Yeon-seok as Choi Jae-hyuk
- Yoo Seo-jin as Choi Shin-young

Min Yong-ki's family

- Kim Hak-chul as Min Yong-ki
- Lee Eung-kyung as Jo Hye-ran
- Jung Joon as Min Tae-hyung
- Clara Lee as Min Young-woo

Extended cast

- Ahn Suk-hwan as Jo Pyung-goo
- Park Yoon-jae as Lee Jae-bok
- Lee Eun-hee as Lee Hyo-ri
- Choi Kwon as Bae Sam-bong
- Yeom Hyun-seo as Jo Mi-so
- Kim Min-gook as Han Min-gook
- Hong Sung-sook as Kang Yoo-kyung
- Seok Jin-yi as Kim Hee-soo
- Kim Re-ah as Lee Young-hee
- Bae Jang-hwan as Kim Hwan
- Jung Yoo-seok as Hong Seok-goo
- Heo Joon-seok as Tae-kwon
- Han Sung-yong as Choon-bae
- Kang Chang-mook as chauffeur
- Kim Joon-hyung as Seo Hyung-jin
- Kim Ja-ok
- Jeon Jin-seo as Kid in a coma
