= Park Yoon-jae =

South Korean actor (born 1981)

- Born: January 14, 1981 (age 45); South Korea
- Education: Myongji College - Theater Studies
- Occupation: Actor
- Years active: 2002–present
- Agent: Nest Management (네스트매니지먼트)
- Family: Chae Rim (sister)

Korean name
- Hangul: 박윤재
- RR: Bak Yunjae
- MR: Pak Yunjae

Park Yoon-jae (Korean: 박윤재; born January 14, 1981) is a South Korean actor. He is best known for starring in the television series Indomitable Daughters-in-Law (2011), Your Lady (2013), and Shining Romance (2013).

== Filmography ==
=== Television series ===
Year	Title	Role	Notes/Ref.
2002	The Maengs' Golden Era	Choi Kyu-young	
2008	Spotlight	Yoon Seok-chang	
2011	New Tales of Gisaeng	Oh Jin-am	
2011	Indomitable Daughters-in-Law	Moon Shin-woo	
2012	Tasty Life	Lee Jae-bok	
2012	Faith	Prince Deokheung	
2013	Your Lady	Kang Jung-hoon	
2013	Love in Her Bag	Kang Min-ki	
2013	Shining Romance	Kang Ha-joon	
2015	The Invincible Lady Cha	Kim Ji-seok	
2017	Unknown Woman	Goo Do-chi	
2018–2019	It's My Life	Yang Nam-jin	
2021	Red Shoes	Yoon Ki-seok	
2022–2023	Vengeance of the Bride	Oh Ji-hoon / Lee Jae-yong	
2025	Queen's House	Hwang Ki-chan	

=== Film ===
Year	Title	Role
2002	The Coast Guard	Private Yoon
2007	Bravo My Life	Jin Hyun-sub
2009	Fly High	Young-ho's friend

== Awards and nominations ==
Award	Year	Category	Nominated work	Result	Ref.
Baeksang Arts Awards	2012	Best New Actor (TV)	Indomitable Daughters-in-Law	Nominated	
KBS Drama Awards	2018	Excellence Award ㅡ Actor in a Daily Drama	It's My Life	Won	
KBS Drama Awards	2018	Best Couple Award (With Seo Hyo-rim)	It's My Life	Nominated	
KBS Drama Awards	2025	Excellence Award ㅡ Actor in a Daily Drama	Queen's House	Won	
MBC Drama Awards	2011	Best New Actor in a Serial Drama	Indomitable Daughters-in-Law	Won	
MBC Drama Awards	2014	Top Excellence Award, Actor in a Serial Drama	Shining Romance	Nominated	
SBS Drama Awards	2013	Excellence Award, Actor in a Weekend/Daily Drama	Your Lady	Nominated	
