= It's My Life (South Korean TV series) =

2018 South Korean television series

- Promotional poster
- Hangul: 비켜라 운명아
- RR: Bikyeora unmyeonga
- MR: Pik'yŏra unmyŏnga
- Genre: Family; Melodrama
- Written by: Park Gye-hyung
- Directed by: Kwak Gi-won
- Starring: Park Yoon-jae; Seo Hyo-rim; Jin Ye-sol; Kang Tae-sung
- Country of origin: South Korea
- Original language: Korean
- No. of episodes: 124 (Note: Originally scheduled to air for 120 episodes, the series was extended by four episodes in lieu of one pre-empt.)

Production
- Running time: 35 minutes
- Production company: KBS Drama Production

Original release
- Network: KBS1
- Release: November 5, 2018 – April 26, 2019

It's My Life (Korean: 비켜라 운명아) is a 2018 South Korean television series starring Park Yoon-jae, Seo Hyo-rim, Jin Ye-sol and Kang Tae-sung. The series aired daily on KBS1 from 8:25 p.m. to 9:00 p.m. (KST) from November 5, 2018, to April 26, 2019.

== Cast ==
=== Main ===
- Park Yoon-jae as Yang Nam-jin
- Seo Hyo-rim as Han Seung-joo
- Jin Ye-sol as Jeong Jin-ah
- Kang Tae-sung as Choi Shi-woo

=== Supporting ===
- Jo Duk-hyun as Lee Sang-hyeon
- Hong Yo-seob as Han Man-seok
- Kim Hye-ri as Choi Soo-hee
- Nam Il-woo as Ahn Seok-ho
- Kang Doo as Go Seon-gyoo
- Baek Soo-ryun as Mrs. Kang
- Im Chae-moo as Jang Hee-cheol
- Kim Do-yeon
- Lee Jong-nam as Yang Soon-ja
- Lee Shi-ah
- Kang Shin-il as Heo Chung-san
- Yuk Dong-il as Kang Dae-shik
- Song Min-ji as Seo Yeon-ji
- Yoo Ji-yeon as Ko Yeon-shil
- Kim Kyung-ryong as Kang Dae-shik's father
- Kang Doo as Ko Sun-kyu
- Jeon Jin-seo

=== Special appearances ===
- Kim Gwang-in
- Dong Yoon-seok

== Viewership ==
- In this table, the blue numbers represent the lowest ratings and the red numbers represent the highest ratings.
- N/A denotes that the rating is not known.

Ep.	Original broadcast date	Average audience share		
Ep.	Original broadcast date	TNmS	AGB Nielsen	
Ep.	Original broadcast date	Nationwide	Nationwide	Seoul
1	November 5, 2018	19.6%	17.3% (1st)	15.9% (1st)
2	November 6, 2018	17.4%	16.7% (1st)	15.0% (1st)
3	November 7, 2018	—N/a	14.7% (1st)	13.0% (1st)
4	November 8, 2018	—N/a	17.8% (1st)	16.0% (1st)
5	November 9, 2018	—N/a	16.7% (1st)	15.4% (1st)
6	November 12, 2018	18.3%	16.4% (1st)	14.6% (1st)
7	November 13, 2018	18.7%	17.2% (1st)	15.7% (1st)
8	November 14, 2018	19.9%	17.5% (1st)	15.5% (1st)
9	November 15, 2018	21.5%	18.9% (1st)	13.9% (1st)
10	November 16, 2018	20.3%	17.3% (1st)	15.4% (1st)
11	November 19, 2018	22.2%	19.6% (1st)	17.4% (1st)
12	November 20, 2018	18.2%	17.7% (1st)	16.1% (1st)
13	November 21, 2018	21.1%	18.2% (1st)	15.7% (1st)
14	November 22, 2018	22.5%	19.1% (1st)	17.1% (1st)
15	November 23, 2018	21.1%	18.6% (1st)	17.1% (1st)
16	November 26, 2018	22.9%	19.6% (1st)	17.4% (1st)
17	November 27, 2018	21.8%	19.0% (1st)	17.7% (1st)
18	November 28, 2018	21.8%	17.9% (1st)	15.8% (1st)
19	November 29, 2018	22.3%	19.0% (1st)	17.4% (1st)
20	November 30, 2018	20.5%	18.5% (1st)	16.3% (1st)
21	December 3, 2018	22.4%	20.0% (1st)	17.7% (1st)
22	December 4, 2018	21.1%	20.3% (1st)	18.0% (1st)
23	December 5, 2018	21.2%	18.3% (1st)	16.3% (1st)
24	December 6, 2018	22.9%	18.5% (1st)	16.5% (1st)
25	December 7, 2018	—N/a	19.1% (1st)	17.9% (1st)
26	December 10, 2018	19.3%	18.9% (1st)	17.2% (1st)
27	December 11, 2018	19.8%	18.4% (1st)	16.8% (1st)
28	December 12, 2018	20.0%	17.0% (1st)	14.6% (1st)
29	December 13, 2018	21.3%	19.2% (1st)	17.9% (1st)
30	December 14, 2018	21.4%	18.1% (1st)	16.8% (1st)
31	December 17, 2018	21.7%	18.4% (1st)	16.8% (1st)
32	December 18, 2018	20.3%	17.7% (1st)	16.1% (1st)
33	December 19, 2018	21.6%	18.6% (1st)	17.0% (1st)
34	December 20, 2018	21.5%	18.8% (1st)	17.0% (1st)
35	December 21, 2018	20.5%	18.7% (1st)	17.4% (1st)
36	December 24, 2018	20.6%	18.1% (1st)	16.3% (1st)
37	December 25, 2018	20.7%	19.1% (1st)	17.3% (1st)
38	December 26, 2018	21.3%	19.0% (1st)	17.3% (1st)
39	December 27, 2018	22.2%	19.1% (1st)	17.7% (2nd)
40	December 28, 2018	21.8%	19.7% (1st)	18.3% (1st)
41	December 31, 2018	19.8%	18.4% (1st)	17.3% (1st)
42	January 1, 2019	15.3%	15.6% (1st)	14.4% (1st)
43	January 2, 2019	21.0%	19.3% (1st)	17.8% (1st)
44	January 3, 2019	23.0%	20.1% (1st)	19.1% (1st)
45	January 4, 2019	21.3%	19.9% (1st)	18.3% (1st)
46	January 7, 2019	22.1%	19.5% (1st)	17.5% (1st)
47	January 8, 2019	—N/a	19.1% (1st)	17.4% (1st)
48	January 9, 2019	20.7%	17.9% (1st)	16.1% (1st)
49	January 10, 2019	22.4%	20.4% (1st)	18.8% (1st)
50	January 11, 2019	20.5%	19.4% (1st)	17.8% (1st)
51	January 14, 2019	21.6%	20.0% (1st)	18.6% (1st)
52	January 15, 2019	21.1%	19.2% (1st)	17.4% (1st)
53	January 16, 2019	20.3%	20.1% (1st)	18.9% (1st)
54	January 17, 2019	22.2%	20.0% (1st)	18.5% (1st)
55	January 18, 2019	21.6%	20.5% (1st)	19.5% (1st)
56	January 21, 2019	22.2%	19.7% (1st)	18.3% (1st)
57	January 22, 2019	22.0%	20.2% (1st)	18.8% (1st)
58	January 23, 2019	21.3%	19.6% (1st)	17.8% (1st)
59	January 24, 2019	22.8%	20.8% (1st)	18.8% (1st)
60	January 25, 2019	21.2%	20.4% (1st)	19.0% (1st)
61	January 28, 2019	23.2%	21.6% (1st)	20.6% (1st)
62	January 29, 2019	22.2%	20.3% (1st)	18.8% (1st)
63	January 30, 2019	21.8%	19.5% (1st)	17.9% (1st)
64	January 31, 2019	22.6%	21.3% (1st)	19.2% (1st)
65	February 1, 2019	22.0%	21.1% (1st)	19.6% (1st)
66	February 4, 2019	16.6%	16.1% (1st)	15.0% (1st)
67	February 5, 2019	15.4%	16.1% (1st)	15.4% (1st)
68	February 6, 2019	19.3%	19.9% (1st)	19.0% (1st)
69	February 7, 2019	23.7%	21.5% (1st)	19.8% (1st)
70	February 8, 2019	21.9%	20.4% (1st)	18.4% (1st)
71	February 11, 2019	22.0%	20.9% (1st)	18.9% (1st)
72	February 12, 2019	23.1%	20.9% (1st)	19.0% (1st)
73	February 13, 2019	22.4%	20.0% (1st)	18.2% (1st)
74	February 14, 2019	22.8%	21.8% (1st)	20.5% (1st)
75	February 15, 2019	22.8%	21.4% (1st)	20.0% (1st)
76	February 18, 2019	24.1%	21.2% (1st)	19.7% (1st)
77	February 19, 2019	23.4%	21.0% (1st)	19.3% (1st)
78	February 20, 2019	23.6%	19.9% (1st)	17.9% (1st)
79	February 21, 2019	24.1%	21.3% (1st)	19.1% (1st)
80	February 22, 2019	23.6%	20.5% (1st)	18.5% (1st)
81	February 25, 2019	24.9%	21.2% (1st)	19.9% (1st)
82	February 26, 2019	23.4%	21.4% (1st)	19.9% (1st)
83	February 28, 2019 (Note: No episode was aired on February 27 due to news coverage of the 2019 North Korea–United States Hanoi Summit.)	18.5%	17.6% (1st)	16.5% (1st)
84	March 1, 2019	22.3%	20.9% (1st)	19.1% (1st)
85	March 4, 2019	24.5%	22.5% (1st)	20.3% (1st)
86	March 5, 2019	24.9%	23.1% (1st)	21.0% (1st)
87	March 6, 2019	23.7%	21.9% (1st)	20.4% (1st)
88	March 7, 2019	25.8%	22.7% (1st)	20.5% (1st)
89	March 8, 2019	24.9%	21.1% (1st)	19.3% (1st)
90	March 11, 2019	25.0%	22.8% (1st)	20.5% (1st)
91	March 12, 2019	25.6%	21.9% (1st)	20.1% (1st)
92	March 13, 2019	23.6%	21.2% (1st)	19.5% (1st)
93	March 14, 2019	24.8%	22.2% (1st)	20.3% (1st)
94	March 15, 2019	24.8%	20.9% (1st)	19.6% (1st)
95	March 18, 2019	24.8%	21.6% (1st)	20.0% (1st)
96	March 19, 2019	24.5%	21.5% (1st)	20.0% (1st)
97	March 20, 2019	24.0%	21.2% (1st)	19.4% (1st)
98	March 21, 2019	24.2%	22.0% (1st)	20.1% (1st)
99	March 22, 2019	20.4%	19.2% (1st)	18.3% (1st)
100	March 25, 2019	25.4%	21.7% (1st)	19.5% (1st)
101	March 26, 2019	21.0%	18.7% (1st)	17.0% (1st)
102	March 27, 2019	22.5%	20.5% (1st)	19.5% (1st)
103	March 28, 2019	23.9%	21.4% (1st)	19.8% (1st)
104	March 29, 2019	22.7%	20.1% (1st)	18.3% (1st)
105	April 1, 2019	24.5%	22.2% (1st)	20.4% (1st)
106	April 2, 2019	23.2%	21.2% (1st)	19.3% (1st)
107	April 3, 2019	23.3%	20.1% (1st)	18.0% (1st)
108	April 4, 2019	23.7%	21.2% (1st)	19.8% (1st)
109	April 5, 2019	22.7%	20.6% (1st)	18.7% (1st)
110	April 8, 2019	24.7%	22.0% (1st)	20.0% (1st)
111	April 9, 2019	23.8%	21.5% (1st)	19.8% (1st)
112	April 10, 2019	22.7%	20.4% (1st)	18.2% (1st)
113	April 11, 2019	19.6%	17.9% (1st)	16.9% (1st)
114	April 12, 2019	22.6%	20.3% (1st)	19.1% (1st)
115	April 15, 2019	23.6%	21.2% (1st)	19.3% (1st)
116	April 16, 2019	23.0%	19.7% (1st)	17.7% (1st)
117	April 17, 2019	21.4%	18.8% (1st)	16.7% (1st)
118	April 18, 2019	24.0%	19.6% (1st)	17.2% (1st)
119	April 19, 2019	20.6%	18.3% (1st)	16.7% (1st)
120	April 22, 2019	24.5%	20.8% (1st)	18.6% (1st)
121	April 23, 2019	24.0%	21.1% (1st)	18.8% (1st)
122	April 24, 2019	23.6%	19.5% (1st)	17.2% (1st)
123	April 25, 2019	25.7%	20.8% (1st)	19.3% (1st)
124	April 26, 2019	24.4%	20.4% (1st)	18.9% (1st)
Average		—	19.7%	18.0%

== Awards and nominations ==
Year	Award	Category	Recipient	Result	Ref.
2018	2018 KBS Drama Awards	Excellence Award, Actor in a Daily Drama	Park Yoon-jae	Won	
2018	2018 KBS Drama Awards	Excellence Award, Actress in a Daily Drama	Seo Hyo-rim	Nominated	
