= Sweet Enemy =

2017 South Korean television series

- Promotional Poster
- Also known as: Sweet Revenge
- Hangul: 달콤한 원수
- RR: Dalkomhan wonsu
- MR: Talk'omhan wŏnsu
- Genre: Family; Melodrama; Revenge; Romance
- Created by: Hong Chang-wook
- Written by: Baek Young-sook
- Directed by: Lee Hyun-jik
- Creative directors: Lee Dan; Seo Yong-ho
- Starring: Park Eun-hye; Yoo Gun; Lee Jae-woo; Park Tae-in
- Composer: Park Se-joon
- Country of origin: South Korea
- Original language: Korean
- No. of episodes: 124 (Note: Originally scheduled to air for 120 episodes, the series was extended by four episodes in lieu of one preempt.)

Production
- Executive producer: Hwang Chang-wook
- Producer: Ahn Suk-joon
- Cinematography: Park Jong-gi
- Editor: Jang Shi-yeon
- Camera setup: Single-camera
- Running time: 40 minutes
- Production companies: Sweet Enemy SPC; FNC Add Culture

Original release
- Network: SBS TV
- Release: June 12 – December 1, 2017

Sweet Enemy (Korean: 달콤한 원수; RR: Dalkomhan wonsu) is a 2017 South Korean television series starring Park Eun-hye, Yoo Gun, Lee Jae-woo, and Park Tae-in. The series airs daily on SBS TV from 8:30 a.m. to 9:10 a.m. (KST).

== Plot ==
Oh Dal-Nim (Park Eun-Hye) is falsely accused of murder. She decides to take revenge on those responsible for misery.

== Cast ==
=== Main ===
- Park Eun-hye as Oh Dal-nim

Staff of Best Food Product Development Department. She is an expert on food. Her life was totally changed after she was wrongly accused of murdering Jae-hee.

- Yoo Gun as Choi Sun-ho

General Manager of Best Food, Bok-nam's grandson. Although he will be the inheritor of the company soon, he still fascinated in comic books. After his lover Jae-hee's death, he became deeply depressed and lost his motivation in life.

- Lee Jae-woo as Jung Jae-wook

Famous chef in Korea, Yi-ran's step son. He is usually surrounded by female admirers.

- Park Tae-in as Hong Se-na

Jae-hee's best friend since their childhood, Department Manager of Best Food Product Development Department. She acts like a kind-hearted person in front of everyone, but she hates Jae-hee because of her success. One day, she pushed Jae-hee down from the upper verandah of Sun-ho's family summer villa and she died.

=== Supporting ===
==== People around Jae-wook ====
- Lee Bo-hee as Yoon Yi-ran
- Choi Ja-hye as Jung Jae-hee

==== People around Se-na ====
- Kim Hee-jung as Ma Yoo-Kyung
- Kim Ho-chang as Hong Se-kang

==== People around Sun-ho / Best Food ====
- Jang Jung-hee as Cha Bok-nam
- Lee Jin-ah as Ko Eun-jung
- Choi Ryung as Choi Go-bong
- Ok Go-woon as Choi Roo-bi

==== People around Dal-nim ====
- Kwon Jae-hee as Kang Soon-hee
- Lee Chung-mi as Hwang Geum-sook

== Ratings ==
- In this table, The blue numbers represent the lowest ratings and the red numbers represent the highest ratings.

Ep.	Original broadcast date	Average audience share			
Ep.	Original broadcast date	TNmS		AGB Nielsen	
Ep.	Original broadcast date	Nationwide	Seoul	Nationwide	Seoul
1	June 12, 2017	9.6% (9th)	7.3% (18th)	8.3% (10th)	8.2% (9th)
2	June 13, 2017	10.4% (7th)	8.8% (7th)	8.4% (9th)	7.4% (10th)
3	June 14, 2017	9.4% (10th)	8.6% (10th)	7.7% (14th)	7.0% (17th)
4	June 15, 2017	9.1% (11th)	7.3% (17th)	8.8% (9th)	8.3% (9th)
5	June 16, 2017	10.5% (6th)	8.8% (7th)	8.7% (10th)	8.2% (11th)
6	June 19, 2017	8.7% (12th)	7.2% (15th)	7.9% (11th)	7.1% (17th)
7	June 20, 2017	10.0% (8th)	8.3% (8th)	8.3% (12th)	7.7% (11th)
8	June 21, 2017	9.7% (9th)	8.3% (10th)	9.0% (9th)	8.8% (9th)
9	June 22, 2017	10.0% (8th)	8.8% (10th)	9.2% (9th)	9.2% (9th)
10	June 23, 2017	9.6% (10th)	7.7% (14th)	8.1% (10th)	7.5% (11th)
11	June 26, 2017	8.5% (10th)	7.2% (14th)	8.2% (11th)	7.7% (12th)
12	June 27, 2017	9.3% (9th)	7.6% (13th)	7.7% (14th)	7.0% (17th)
13	June 28, 2017	7.7% (12th)	6.7% (18th)	7.9% (12th)	6.8% (15th)
14	June 29, 2017	9.2% (10th)	7.9% (10th)	8.3% (12th)	7.5% (14th)
15	June 30, 2017	7.7% (14th)	6.2% (18th)	8.0% (11th)	7.4% (11th)
16	July 3, 2017	10.0% (13th)	8.2% (15th)	8.7% (10th)	8.1% (12th)
17	July 4, 2017	10.0% (10th)	8.1% (13th)	9.0% (11th)	8.2% (13th)
18	July 5, 2017	9.8% (10th)	7.2% (18th)	8.6% (14th)	8.1% (10th)
19	July 6, 2017	10.5% (12th)	9.1% (11th)	8.6% (13th)	7.8% (14th)
20	July 7, 2017	11.7% (6th)	9.9% (8th)	9.4% (10th)	8.7% (13th)
21	July 10, 2017	10.8% (12th)	8.6% (18th)	9.1% (12th)	8.4% (13th)
22	July 11, 2017	11.9% (8th)	9.3% (12th)	8.9% (11th)	8.0% (11th)
23	July 12, 2017	9.8% (10th)	8.3% (16th)	9.4% (7th)	8.6% (8th)
24	July 13, 2017	11.3% (7th)	9.3% (11th)	9.1% (10th)	8.3% (10th)
25	July 14, 2017	10.8% (9th)	9.2% (11th)	9.6% (7th)	8.4% (9th)
26	July 17, 2017	11.2% (8th)	9.6% (8th)	9.1% (10th)	8.8% (12th)
27	July 18, 2017	11.5% (6th)	9.9% (8th)	9.4% (7th)	8.6% (9th)
28	July 19, 2017	11.7% (6th)	10.0% (8th)	8.9% (11th)	7.9% (15th)
29	July 20, 2017	11.4% (5th)	9.8% (8th)	9.1% (8th)	7.6% (13th)
30	July 21, 2017	11.8% (5th)	10.0% (7th)	9.4% (9th)	8.3% (10th)
31	July 24, 2017	10.8% (11th)	8.7% (15th)	9.3% (9th)	8.8% (10th)
32	July 25, 2017	10.4% (8th)	9.2% (7th)	9.7% (8th)	9.4% (7th)
33	July 26, 2017	11.1% (6th)	8.6% (10th)	9.6% (7th)	9.1% (8th)
34	July 27, 2017	10.5% (7th)	8.8% (12th)	8.7% (11th)	7.2% (16th)
35	July 28, 2017	11.1% (9th)	9.5% (8th)	9.9% (8th)	9.5% (10th)
36	July 31, 2017	11.0% (9th)	8.3% (13th)	9.3% (10th)	8.2% (13th)
37	August 1, 2017	10.3% (9th)	7.9% (14th)	9.0% (8th)	7.8% (12th)
38	August 2, 2017	11.1% (6th)	9.0% (8th)	9.6% (6th)	8.8% (7th)
39	August 3, 2017	10.5% (7th)	9.2% (9th)	9.5% (7th)	8.5% (13th)
40	August 4, 2017	10.7% (6th)	8.8% (9th)	9.6% (10th)	9.4% (8th)
41	August 7, 2017	10.9% (8th)	8.5% (10th)	9.2% (10th)	8.0% (13th)
42	August 8, 2017	11.8% (6th)	10.0% (8th)	9.8% (9th)	8.7% (8th)
43	August 9, 2017	11.9% (5th)	9.5% (8th)	9.6% (9th)	8.4% (9th)
44	August 10, 2017	11.8% (8th)	9.9% (10th)	10.1% (8th)	9.3% (10th)
45	August 11, 2017	12.1% (5th)	9.4% (11th)	10.2% (7th)	8.9% (11th)
46	August 14, 2017	11.5% (6th)	9.1% (13th)	10.3% (7th)	9.8% (17th)
47	August 15, 2017	9.8% (5th)	8.0% (10th)	11.0% (5th)	10.4% (6th)
48	August 16, 2017	11.3% (6th)	8.4% (9th)	10.9% (5th)	9.4% (6th)
49	August 17, 2017	12.7% (4th)	9.6% (8th)	10.9% (5th)	10.1% (7th)
50	August 18, 2017	11.0% (5th)	9.3% (8th)	11.4% (5th)	10.2% (7th)
51	August 21, 2017	11.9% (5th)	9.2% (9th)	10.6% (7th)	9.1% (12th)
52	August 22, 2017	12.2% (4th)	9.6% (6th)	10.3% (6th)	8.9% (8th)
53	August 23, 2017	12.0% (6th)	9.7% (9th)	11.2% (5th)	10.0% (8th)
54	August 24, 2017	12.7% (5th)	10.8% (6th)	11.5% (6th)	10.4% (8th)
55	August 25, 2017	13.5% (4th)	10.7% (8th)	11.3% (6th)	9.8% (9th)
56	August 28, 2017	12.6% (5th)	9.7% (8th)	11.0% (5th)	9.5% (12th)
57	August 29, 2017	13.0% (4th)	9.8% (7th)	11.6% (4th)	10.3% (7th)
58	August 30, 2017	12.7% (5th)	9.7% (8th)	11.3% (5th)	10.0% (7th)
59	August 31, 2017	12.6% (4th)	10.6% (5th)	11.2% (NR)	10.1% (NR)
60	September 1, 2017	12.2% (4th)	9.1% (10th)	11.5% (5th)	10.5% (8th)
61	September 4, 2017	11.4% (6th)	9.2% (7th)	11.6% (4th)	10.8% (5th)
62	September 5, 2017	10.6% (4th)	9.3% (5th)	10.2% (6th)	8.6% (7th)
63	September 6, 2017	12.5% (4th)	9.8% (7th)	11.0% (5th)	9.7% (8th)
64	September 7, 2017	12.7% (4th)	10.4% (7th)	11.4% (5th)	9.9% (8th)
65	September 8, 2017	12.3% (5th)	8.9% (9th)	11.3% (5th)	10.0% (7th)
66	September 11, 2017	14.1% (4th)	10.8% (6th)	12.1% (6th)	10.9% (7th)
67	September 12, 2017	12.4% (5th)	10.0% (9th)	11.6% (5th)	10.5% (6th)
68	September 13, 2017	12.1% (6th)	9.0% (8th)	11.4% (6th)	10.5% (7th)
69	September 14, 2017	13.0% (6th)	10.4% (8th)	10.6% (7th)	9.5% (8th)
70	September 15, 2017	12.1% (6th)	9.6% (9th)	11.5% (5th)	10.9% (6th)
71	September 18, 2017	11.9% (7th)	10.4% (7th)	11.3% (6th)	10.2% (6th)
72	September 19, 2017	12.3% (6th)	10.2% (6th)	11.5% (5th)	10.1% (6th)
73	September 20, 2017	13.0% (5th)	10.2% (8th)	11.7% (5th)	10.4% (6th)
74	September 21, 2017	13.4% (4th)	10.6% (7th)	12.3% (5th)	10.5% (8th)
75	September 22, 2017	14.0% (5th)	12.0% (5th)	12.9% (4th)	12.0% (5th)
76	September 25, 2017	13.0% (5th)	10.9% (5th)	13.0% (5th)	11.5% (6th)
77	September 26, 2017	13.4% (5th)	11.5% (5th)	12.0% (4th)	10.9% (6th)
78	September 27, 2017	15.4% (4th)	11.9% (5th)	13.0% (4th)	11.4% (4th)
79	September 28, 2017	13.6% (4th)	11.7% (5th)	13.3% (4th)	11.0% (7th)
80	September 29, 2017	13.2% (5th)	10.2% (5th)	13.6% (4th)	12.6% (4th)
81	October 2, 2017	10.6% (6th)	8.0% (10th)	10.8% (5th)	9.7% (8th)
82	October 3, 2017	11.7% (5th)	9.0% (6th)	10.1% (4th)	9.8% (4th)
83	October 4, 2017	8.9% (5th)	6.3% (11th)	6.7% (8th)	6.3% (10th)
84	October 5, 2017	10.9% (4th)	8.7% (8th)	9.9% (6th)	8.9% (9th)
85	October 6, 2017	12.0% (5th)	8.9% (6th)	12.3% (4th)	11.4% (3rd)
86	October 9, 2017	13.4% (4th)	10.4% (7th)	12.2% (4th)	10.4% (10th)
87	October 10, 2017	13.6% (5th)	11.4% (6th)	12.8% (5th)	12.0% (5th)
88	October 11, 2017	13.4% (5th)	10.9% (6th)	13.3% (4th)	12.1% (3rd)
89	October 12, 2017	14.2% (5th)	11.3% (6th)	12.3% (5th)	10.8% (7th)
90	October 13, 2017	14.4% (3rd)	11.9% (3rd)	12.8% (4th)	11.5% (4th)
91	October 16, 2017	13.7% (5th)	11.1% (5th)	11.8% (6th)	10.5% (6th)
92	October 17, 2017	13.8% (4th)	11.0% (5th)	11.4% (6th)	9.7% (6th)
93	October 18, 2017	13.9% (4th)	11.6% (5th)	11.7% (4th)	11.0% (5th)
94	October 19, 2017	13.2% (6th)	11.3% (7th)	11.8% (6th)	10.8% (6th)
95	October 20, 2017	13.7% (3rd)	11.3% (5th)	12.2% (3rd)	11.4% (4th)
96	October 23, 2017	13.3% (6th)	11.5% (5th)	11.6% (6th)	9.9% (8th)
97	October 24, 2017	13.1% (5th)	10.3% (6th)	11.3% (5th)	10.3% (6th)
98	October 25, 2017	13.6% (4th)	11.0% (4th)	11.1% (4th)	9.5% (5th)
99	October 26, 2017	13.7% (2nd)	10.3% (4th)	12.4% (2nd)	11.0% (5th)
100	October 27, 2017	12.8% (4th)	9.9% (7th)	11.9% (5th)	10.1% (5th)
101	October 30, 2017	14.3% (2nd)	11.9% (4th)	12.6% (3rd)	11.6% (3rd)
102	October 31, 2017	14.4% (3rd)	11.8% (4th)	12.4% (4th)	11.2% (4th)
103	November 2, 2017 (Note: No episode was aired on November 1 due to the broadcast of SBS 15th Future Korean Report.)	13.7% (5th)	11.4% (6th)	11.8% (4th)	10.7% (5th)
104	November 3, 2017	12.9% (5th)	10.4% (7th)	11.9% (6th)	10.5% (6th)
105	November 6, 2017	13.5% (5th)	11.2% (5th)	12.0% (5th)	10.7% (5th)
106	November 7, 2017	13.7% (5th)	11.9% (6th)	12.2% (5th)	10.7% (6th)
107	November 8, 2017	13.3% (5th)	10.8% (5th)	12.2% (5th)	10.5% (5th)
108	November 9, 2017	13.6% (5th)	10.9% (6th)	12.3% (5th)	10.6% (6th)
109	November 10, 2017	12.8% (5th)	10.4% (8th)	12.3% (5th)	10.8% (8th)
110	November 13, 2017	12.9% (5th)	10.4% (8th)	12.3% (6th)	11.0% (8th)
111	November 14, 2017	13.6% (4th)	10.7% (6th)	12.0% (6th)	10.7% (7th)
112	November 15, 2017	14.2% (4th)	11.6% (4th)	12.6% (4th)	11.3% (4th)
113	November 16, 2017	13.4% (4th)	10.9% (4th)	12.3% (4th)	11.4% (4th)
114	November 17, 2017	13.6% (5th)	11.1% (6th)	12.8% (6th)	11.1% (6th)
115	November 20, 2017	12.9% (5th)	9.7% (7th)	12.8% (5th)	11.4% (5th)
116	November 21, 2017	14.6% (5th)	12.2% (5th)	12.9% (5th)	11.3% (6th)
117	November 22, 2017	13.7% (5th)	11.8% (5th)	12.3% (5th)	11.2% (5th)
118	November 23, 2017	13.6% (5th)	10.9% (6th)	11.9% (5th)	10.9% (6th)
119	November 24, 2017	13.9% (3rd)	11.4% (4th)	12.8% (5th)	11.7% (6th)
120	November 27, 2017	14.0% (3rd)	11.7% (4th)	12.5% (4th)	11.9% (4th)
121	November 28, 2017	13.5% (4th)	11.3% (5th)	12.9% (5th)	12.0% (5th)
122	November 29, 2017	13.5% (4th)	10.8% (4th)	12.3% (4th)	11.5% (4th)
123	November 30, 2017	14.3% (3rd)	11.6% (4th)	12.8% (4th)	11.6% (4th)
124	December 1, 2017	13.8% (3rd)	12.1% (4th)	12.0% (5th)	11.1% (7th)
Average		12.04%	9.79%	10.77%	9.71%
