= Jin Miryung =

South Korean singer (born 1957)

- Born: April 5, 1957 (age 68)
- Origin: Seoul, South Korea
- Genres: Trot, Ballad
- Occupation(s): Singer, actress, television presenter
- Years active: 1975–present

Korean name
- Hangul: 진미령
- RR: Jin Miryeong
- MR: Chin Miryŏng

Jin Miryung (Korean: 진미령; born April 5, 1957) is a South Korean television presenter, singer, and actress.

== Biography ==
She made her debut in 1977 at the 1st MBC Seoul Music Festival with the song "The Girl and the Streetlight" (lyrics and composition by Jang Deok). It was previously rumored that her maternal grandmother was of Chinese descent, but she is actually of pure Korean heritage. Her father, Kim Dong-seok, was a member of the Korean Liberation Army and participated in the Korean War. She was in a common-law relationship with comedian Jeon Yu-seong from 1993 to 2011. She was originally a singer who released up to her 14th album, she later transitioned into a broadcaster and appeared in various entertainment shows, dramas, and films.

== Discography ==
=== Studio albums ===
- 1976: Debut Split Album "I Won't Forget"
- 1977: 1st Album "Tell Me / When I Feel Love"
- 1978: 2nd Album "Stories of the Past / A Father's Love"
- 1979: 3rd Album "White Dandelion / Soap Bubbles"
- 1980: 4th Album "Regretful Love / Rainbow"
- 1980: 5th Album "Your Voice / Regretful Love"
- 1981: 6th Album "Departing Ship / Han-O-Baek-Nyeon"
- 1989: 7th Album From LA to Seoul – "One and Two / Aha"
- 1991: 8th Album Golden Album – "I Like Being Alone / Garage"
- 1994: 9th Album "A Woman at Thirty / Only Me by Your Side"
- 1996: 10th Album "A Man's Dream"
- 2002: 11th Album "Stepmother"
- 2004: 12th Album "The Day I Became a Woman for the First Time"
- 2007: 13th Album "Alone"
- 2008: 14th Album "Perfect Couple"

=== Other albums ===
- 1977: 1st Seoul Music Festival "The Girl and the Streetlamp"
- 1980: Jin Mi-ryeong & Jung Yoon-sun – Old Songs Revisited ("Song of Sorrow / Again, Even If I Hate You")
- 1990: Jang Deok Memorial Album "After You Left"
