= Comedy TV =

South Korean TV channel

Comedy TV was a South Korean cable channel owned by iHQ. It started in October 2000. It ceased to exist as a cable channel from July 5, 2021 as it changed its name to iHQ to allow airing of more diverse programming, and was reborn as a YouTube streaming channel until 2024.

== Program allocations ==
The channel aired contents related with comedy.In 2008, they made a program regarding supernatural phenomena called "ghost spot". In 2009, a program regarding Ulzzang first aired. From 2015, show called "Delicious things (맛있는 녀석들) gained popularity and made the YouTube channel owned by the company earn a gold button on YouTube.
