= List of Life Bar episodes =

Life Bar (Korean: 인생술집) is a South Korean talk show distributed by tvN every Saturday at 10:50 pm. Season 1 broadcast its final episode on April 13, 2017. Season 2 premiered on May 18, 2017.

As of April 11, 2019, 118 episodes of Life Bar have been aired.

== Series overview ==
Year	Episodes	Originally aired	
Year	Episodes	First aired	Last aired
2016	4	December 8, 2016	December 29, 2016
2017	47	January 5, 2017	December 28, 2017
2018	52	January 4, 2018	December 27, 2018
2019	15	January 3, 2019	April 11, 2019

== Episodes ==
=== 2016 ===
List of episodes in 2016 (episode 1–4)

Ep. #	Air Date	Guest(s)	Remarks
Season 1
1	December 8, 2016	Cho Jin-woong	Special Guest: Kwon Yul
2	December 15, 2016	Park Sung-woong	Special Guest: Jung Sun Hee; Kim Root joined the Employees
3	December 22, 2016	Ha Ji-won	Special Guest: Chong Ha Bong
4	December 29, 2016	Hyun-soo Kim	Special Guest: Lee Yeong-ran

=== 2017 ===
List of episodes in 2017 (episode 5–51)

Ep. #	Air Date	Guest(s)	Remarks
5	January 5, 2017	Yoo In-young	Special Guest: Hong Yoon Hwa
6	January 12, 2017	Jang Hyuk	Special Guest: Baek Seung-won
7	January 19, 2017	Kim Sung-kyun	
8	January 26, 2017	Kim Soo-ro, Kang Sung-jin	
9	February 2, 2017	Lee Da-hae	Special Guest: Yoon So-yi; Eric Nam joined the regular MC
10	February 9, 2017	Yoo Jun-sang	
11	February 16, 2017	Kang Ha-neul	Special Guest: Han Jae-young
12	February 23, 2017	Yoon Jin-seo	Special Guest: Oh Ji-ho
13	March 2, 2017	Seo Shin-ae, Jung Chae-yeon (DIA), Cheng Xiao (Cosmic Girls), Solbin (Laboum)	Special MC: Yoon So-yi
14	March 9, 2017	Seo Shin-ae, Jung Chae-yeon (DIA), Cheng Xiao (Cosmic Girls), Solbin (Laboum)	Special MC: Yoon So-yi
15	March 16, 2017	Han Chae-ah	
16	March 23, 2017	Bae Jong-ok	
17	March 30, 2017	Im Si-wan, Park Byung-eun	
18	April 6, 2017	Kim Nam-gil, Park Sung-woong	
19	April 13, 2017	Girl's Day	Tak Jae-hoon & Eric Nam last episode as a MC
Season 2
20	May 18, 2017	Seo Jang-hoon, Son Dam-bi; Seo Ji-hye, Shin So-yul #1	Kim Hee-chul & Yura joined the regular MC
21	May 25, 2017	Seo Ji-hye, Shin So-yul #2; Sechs Kies #1	
22	June 1, 2017	Sechs Kies #2	
23	June 8, 2017	Lee Moon-sik, Hong Seok-cheon	
24	June 15, 2017	Kim Ok-vin, Kim Hyun-sook	
25	June 22, 2017	Jang Hee-jin, Chae Jung-an	Yura is absent
26	June 29, 2017	Jung Kyung-ho, Go Kyu-pil	
27	July 6, 2017	Kim Gyu-ri, Kim Joo-won	
28	July 13, 2017	Joon Park, Son Ho-young	
29	July 20, 2017	Jung Yong-hwa (CNBLUE), Yoon Park	Kim Jun-hyun last episode as a MC and Kim Root as a Employees
30	August 3, 2017	Yeon Jung-hoon, Lee Won-jong	Broadcast time change Yoo Se-yoon joined the regular MC and J Model as a Employees
31	August 10, 2017	Roy Kim, Im Soo-hyang	Yoo Se-yoon is absent
32	August 17, 2017	Lee Soo-geun, Kim Jong-min	
33	August 24, 2017	Jang Seo-hee, Kim Hyun-jung	
34	August 31, 2017	Kim Sook, Kang Ye-won	
35	September 7, 2017	Seo Jang-hoon, Baek Ji-young	
36	September 14, 2017	Jeong Yu-mi, Yoo In-young	
37	September 21, 2017	Kim Heung-gook, Jung Chan-woo	
38	September 28, 2017	Jo Sung-ha, Oh Hyun-kyung	
39	October 3, 2017	Jung So-min, Lee Mi-do	Chuseok Special
40	October 12, 2017	Choi Si-won (Super Junior), Gong Myung	
41	October 19, 2017	Namkoong Min, Lee Si-eon	
42	October 26, 2017	Lee Tae-min (Shinee), Henry Lau (Super Junior-M)	
43	November 2, 2017	Kim Minkyung, Moon Se-yoon, Yu Minsang, Kim Jun-hyun	Kim Hee-chul is absent
44	November 9, 2017	Super Junior (Eunhyuk, Shindong)	Special Guest: Lee Donghae (Super Junior)
45	November 16, 2017	Lee Seung-hwan, Joo Jin-woo	
46	November 23, 2017	Ahn Jae-wook, Lee Gunmyung	
47	November 30, 2017	Park Jin-young, Park So-hyun	
48	December 7, 2017	Zion.T, CL	Special Guest: Kim Saeng-min
49	December 14, 2017	Kim Saeng-min, Park Na-rae	
50	December 21, 2017	Min Jin-woong, Choi Hee-seo	
51	December 28, 2017	Ock Joo-hyun, Min Woo Hyuk	Substitute for Kim Hee-chul: Tony An; Kim Hee-chul is absent Yura & Yoo Se-yoon last episode as a MC

=== 2018 ===
List of episodes in 2018 (episode 52–103)

Ep. #	Air Date	Guest(s)	Remarks
52	January 4, 2018	Uhm Jung-hwa, Kim Eana	Kim Jun-hyun's return as MC; Jang Do-yeon joined the regular MC
53	January 11, 2018	Kwak Do-won, Park Eun-hye, An Mi-na	
54	January 18, 2018	Jang Yoon-ju, Lee Ha-na	
55	January 25, 2018	Kim Sang-kyung, Choi Gwi-hwa	
56	February 1, 2018	Cho Jae-hyun, Jeon So-min, Go Kyung-pyo	
57	February 8, 2018	Park Hae-soo, Park Ho-san	
58	February 15, 2018	BoA, Son Hyun-joo, Ko Chang-seok #1	
59	February 22, 2018	BoA, Son Hyun-joo, Ko Chang-seok #2; Im Chang-jung, Jung Sang-hoon #1	
60	March 1, 2018	Im Chang-jung, Jung Sang-hoon #2; Jo Jung-suk, Kim Jae-wook #1	Kim Hee-chul is absent #1
61	March 8, 2018	Jo Jung-suk, Kim Jae-wook, #2; Na Kyung-won, Park Young-sun	Substitute for Kim Hee-chul: Oh Man-seok #2; Kim Hee-chul is absent #2
62	March 15, 2018	Changmin (TVXQ), Xiumin (EXO), Mark (NCT), Jang Eui-soo	
63	March 22, 2018	Kim Young-chul, Hong Jin-young	Special Guest: Jin Hae-Sung
64	March 29, 2018	Lee Yu-bi, Lee Chae-young, Defconn	
65	April 5, 2018	Lee Sung-min, Lee El	
66	April 12, 2018	Jeon Hye-bin, Park Kyung-hye	
67	April 19, 2018	Kim Hee-won, Jang Hyeok-jin, EXID (Hani, Seo Hye-lin)	
68	April 26, 2018	Ji Hyun-woo, Jo Eun-ji	Special Guest: Oh Man-seok
69	May 3, 2018	Park Hae-mi, Kim Hoyoung, Kim Ji-woo	
70	May 10, 2018	Nam Gyu-ri, Lee Chun-hee, Lee Kyu-han	Substitute for Kim Hee-chul: Hwang Chi-yeul; Kim Hee-chul is absent
71	May 17, 2018	Tae Jin-ah, Kangnam, Jo Jung-min	
72	May 24, 2018	Kim Yeon-woo, K.Will, Jungyup, Lena Park	Spring Picnic Special 1 Jang Do-yeon last episode as a MC and J Model as a Employees
73	May 31, 2018	Kwon Sang-woo, Sung Dong-il	Spring Picnic Special 2 Special MC: Goo Hara; Special Guest: Jeong Jun-ha
74	June 7, 2018	Dynamic Duo, Son Yeo-eun	Change interior Han Jin joined the regular MC and Jin Hae-Sung as a Employees
75	June 14, 2018	Lee Hyun-yi, Lee Hye-jung, Kim Su-mi	
76	June 21, 2018	Jin Seo-yeon, Oh Na-ra, Shinee (Minho, Key)	
77	June 28, 2018	So-yeon Jang, Shin Jung-geun, Gil Hae-yeon	Special Guest: Yoon Park
78	July 5, 2018	Apink (Park Cho-rong, Jung Eun-ji), Mamamoo (Wheein, Hwasa)	
79	July 12, 2018	Ha Hyun-woo (Guckkasten), Yoon Do-hyun (YB), Lee Hong-gi (F.T. Island), Soyou	Substitute for Jin Hae-Sung: Ji-yong Moon; Jin Hae-Sung is absent
80	July 19, 2018	Lee Hye-young, Oh Yeon-soo	Substitute for Kim Jun-hyun: Hong Seok-cheon; Kim Jun-hyun is absent
81	July 26, 2018	Lee Hye-young, Oh Yeon-soo	Substitute for Kim Jun-hyun: Hong Seok-cheon; Kim Jun-hyun is absent
82	August 2, 2018	Nicole Jung, Narsha (Brown Eyed Girls), Choi Jung-won, Seol In-ah	
83	August 9, 2018	Song Eun-i, Hyolyn, Ahn Young-mi	
84	August 16, 2018	Jo Hyun-jae, Han Eun-jung, Hwang Bo-ra, Hwang Chan-sung (2PM)	
85	August 23, 2018	Oh Sang-jin, Kim So-young, Kim Min-gi, Hong Yoon Hwa	
86	August 30, 2018	Hong Ji-min, Jeong Ae-Yeon, So Yi-hyun	
87	September 6, 2018	Kangta, Cha Ji-Yeon, Choi Yeo-jin, Sandeul (B1A4)	
88	September 13, 2018	Lee Soon-jae, Shin Goo, Son Sook, Park Jung-soo	
89	September 20, 2018	RPR, iKON (Ju-ne, B.I)	Special Guest: Jinhwan (iKON)
90	September 27, 2018	Song Seung-heon, Krystal Jung (f(x)), Lee Si-eon, Tae Won-seok	
91	October 4, 2018	Park Mi-sun, Yang Hee-eun, Lee Seong-Mi	
92	October 11, 2018	Choi Moo-sung, Kim Hye-eun, Yoon Joo-man	
93	October 18, 2018	Kim In-kwon, Son Dam-bi, Kim Sung-chul	
94	October 25, 2018	Kim Eui-sung, Jung Man-sik, Lee Sun-bin	
95	November 1, 2018	Jeon Soo-kyung, Lee Jeongeun, Lee Joon-hyuk, Jo Han-cheol	
96	November 8, 2018	Oh Man-seok, Kim Dong-wan (Shinhwa), Yoo Yeon-seok, Lee Kyu-hyung	
97	November 15, 2018	Oh Man-seok, Kim Dong-wan (Shinhwa), Yoo Yeon-seok, Lee Kyu-hyung	
98	November 22, 2018	Hong Hyeonhui, Heo Min, Lee Su-ji	Special Guest: Jung In-wook
99	November 29, 2018	Shin Hyun-joon, Jung Joon-ho	Special Guests: Han Suk-joon, Kim Taejin
100	December 6, 2018	Lee Jae-ryong, Bae Jong-ok, Song Kyunga, Moon Se-yoon	
101	December 13, 2018	Im Ha-ryong, Kim Jun-ho, Park Sung-kwang	
102	December 20, 2018	Winner (Kim Jin-woo, Kang Seung-yoon), Oh Young-joo, Kim Jang-mi	Special Guest: Yang Jae-woong
103	December 27, 2018	Hong Jin-kyung, Nam Chang-hie, Kim In-seok, Yoon Sung-ho	

=== 2019 ===
List of episodes in 2019 (episode 104–118)

Ep. #	Air Date	Guest(s)	Remarks
104	January 3, 2019	Jong-jin Kim, Kim Bo-sung, Dong Hyun Kim	
105	January 10, 2019	Jang Dong-min, Shin A-young, Song Jae-rim, Yoon So-hee	
106	January 17, 2019	Shin Sung-woo, Ki Tae-young, Yang Dong-geun	
107	January 24, 2019	Kim Hyun-sook, Go Se-won, Yun Seo-hyeon, Lee Kyu-han	
108	January 31, 2019	Yonja Kim, Han Hye-jin, Park Hyun-bin	Special Guest: Park Seong-yeon
109	February 7, 2019	Lee Won-jong, Park Sang-min, Song Sae-byeok, Jo Han-sun	
110	February 14, 2019	Kim Young-ok, Kim Soo-mi, Park Jun-geum	
111	February 21, 2019	Park Hoon, Lee Si-won, Han Bo-reum, Chanyeol (EXO)	
112	February 28, 2019	Jang Hyun-sung, Song Young-gyu, Song Chang-eui	Special Guest: Ji Il-joo
113	March 7, 2019	Oh Hyun-kyung, Jeong Bo-seok, Yoon Yoo-sun	
114	March 14, 2019	Mamamoo	Special Guest: Jang Daehyeon
115	March 21, 2019	Shin Ji, Ayumi, Hwang Kwanghee (ZE:A)	Special Guest: Yook Hye-seung
116	March 28, 2019	Seo Hyun-cheol, Lee Pil-mo, On Joo-wan	
117	April 4, 2019	Gummy, Kim Yuna, Block B (P.O, U-Kwon)	
118	April 11, 2019	Cha Hwa-yeon, Uee	
