= One Dollar Lawyer =

2022 South Korean television series

- Promotional poster
- Hangul: 천원짜리 변호사
- Hanja: 千元짜리 辯護士
- Lit.: One Thousand Won Lawyer
- RR: Cheonwonjjari byeonhosa
- MR: Ch'ŏnwŏntchari pyŏnhosa
- Genre: Legal drama; Comedy
- Created by: Studio S (planning)
- Written by: Choi Soo-jin; Choi Chang-hwan
- Directed by: Kim Jae-hyun; Shin Jung-hoon
- Starring: Namkoong Min; Kim Ji-eun; Choi Dae-hoon; Lee Deok-hwa; Park Jin-woo
- Music by: Kim Seung-yul
- Country of origin: South Korea
- Original language: Korean
- No. of episodes: 12

Production
- Executive producer: Kim Kyung-sun
- Producers: Seo Kyun; Kim Jeol-ho
- Camera setup: Single Camera
- Running time: 70 minutes
- Production company: Studio S

Original release
- Network: SBS TV
- Release: September 23 – November 11, 2022

One Dollar Lawyer (Korean: 천원짜리 변호사) is a 2022 South Korean television series starring Namkoong Min, Kim Ji-eun, Choi Dae-hoon, Lee Deok-hwa, and Park Jin-woo. Its screenplay, written by Choi Su-jin and Choi Chang-hwan, won the Grand Prize at 2015 SBS Screenplay Contest. It aired from September 23 to November 11, 2022, on SBS TV's Fridays and Saturdays at 22:00 (KST) time slot for 12 episodes. It is also available for streaming on Disney+ in selected regions.

== Synopsis ==
Chun Ji-hoon (Namkoong Min) is a former prosecutor in the Supreme Prosecutors' Office of the Republic of Korea who was trying to find a culprit which led to his girlfriend's murder. He has since been a lawyer with extraordinary skills but only charges 1000 won as his attorney's fee.

== Cast ==
=== Main ===
- Namkoong Min as Chun Ji-hoon, a legal hero with strong cost-effectiveness that can be met with a one thousand won bill.
- Kim Ji-eun as Baek Ma-ri, the last presenter of the Judicial Research and Training Institute.
- Choi Dae-hoon as Seo Min-hyuk, a royal prosecutor in the legal world who wants what he likes.
- Lee Deok-hwa as Baek Hyun-moo, an attorney who founded a large law firm, grandfather of Baek Ma-ri.
- Park Jin-woo as Sa Mu-jang, officer manager of a law firm and close friend of Chun Ji-hoon.

=== Supporting ===
==== People around Chun Ji-hoon ====
- Gong Min-jeung as Na Ye-jin, a prosecutor with high lifestyle.
- Kim Ja-young as Jo Eul-rye, the owner of the building that Chun Ji-hoon is renting.

==== Baek Law Firm ====
- Ha Sung-kwang as Seo Young-joon, a lawyer from Baek Hyun-moo's law firm.
- Jo Yeon-hee as Oh Min-ah, Baek Ma-ri's mother.
- Lee Chung-ah as Lee Joo-young, a lawyer who excels in a large law firm full of justice.

==== Others ====
- Kim Cheol-yoon as Lee Myung-ho, Chun Ji-hoon's client who is guilty of 4 criminal thefts.
- Park Sung-joon as Kim Min-jae, Ji-hoon's client.
- Hwang Jung-min as Lee Young-ok, the wife of Sa Ma-jang's office manager.
- Kwon Hyuk-sung as Chun Ji-hoon's assistant, during his time as a prosecutor.

=== Extended ===
- Lee So-young as Lee Myung-ho's wife.
- Kim Hyung-mook as Chun Young-bae, he is the managing director of Cha Myung Group.
- Han Dong-hee as Kim Soo-yeon, she is a 26-year-old emergency medicine physician and sister of Kim Min-jae.
- Um Hyo-sup as Kim Chun-gil, famous painter, 58 years old, currently missing from a lawsuit against netizens. Everyone believed that Kim Min-jae killed and buried him in Yongho Mountain.
- Park Seon-ah as Yoo Hee-joo, directed of Youngwan Gallery is 54 years old. She was the victim of the Pung Jin Dong murder case on the day of the incident.
- Yoon Na-moo as Choi Ki-tae, chairman of JQ Group, 3rd Generation Chaebol.
- Nam Myeong-ryeol as Kim Yun-seop, he is a former member of the Central Investigation Department of the Office of the Attorney General and the Attorney General, Chun Ji-hoon's Father.
- Jeon Jin-oh as Jo Woo-seok, the killer who claims to kill Lee Joo-young.
- Hyun Bong-sik as Hwang Geum-sik, used car dealer.
- Kim Min-sang as CEO of a used car dealer.
- Kwon Hyuk-beom as Cha Min-cheol, Chun Ji-hoon's new client and the real criminal who killed Lee Joo-young.
- Joo Seok-tae as Choi Ki-seok, chairman of JQ Group.

=== Special appearances ===
- Lee Je-hoon as Top Star Lee Je-hoon
- Jung Moon-sung as Shin Joong-hoon

== Production ==
The series was planned and produced by the drama department of SBS known as Studio S. On August 18, 2022, photos of script reading were released by the production.

In September 20, the press conference was canceled as actor Namkoong Min tested positive for COVID-19 on the same day of the press conference.

Namkoong Min and Kim Ji-eun have previously worked in The Veil. The two also have previously worked with Park Jin-woo in The Veil.

On October 21, 2022, a special episode was aired as the announcer Jang Sung-kyu takes on the role of MC. The series was also downgraded the episodes from 14 episodes to 12 instead.

Filming for the drama ended on November 3, 2022.

== Original soundtrack ==
=== Part 1 ===
Released on September 24, 2022
No.	Title	Lyrics	Music	Artist	Length
1.	"Get in Line" (줄서)	J.SEASON; BC3000; Kim Hyun-jun	J.SEASON; BC3000; Kim Hyun-jun	DinDin	3:10
2.	"Get in Line" (줄서; Inst.)		J.SEASON; BC3000; Kim Hyun-jun		3:10
Total length:					6:20

=== Part 2 ===
Released on October 1, 2022
No.	Title	Lyrics	Music	Artist	Length
1.	"Solomon" (솔로몬)	Koonta	Koonta; J.SEASON; BC3000	Koonta	3:20
2.	"Solomon" (솔로몬; Inst.)		Koonta; J.SEASON; BC3000		3:20
Total length:					6:40

=== Part 3 ===
Released on October 8, 2022
No.	Title	Lyrics	Music	Artist	Length
1.	"Day and Day" (또 하루는)	Lee Su-yeon	KOOW	Kang Heo Dalim	3:59
2.	"Day and Day" (또 하루는; Inst.)		KOOW		3:59
Total length:					7:58

=== Part 4 ===
Released on October 14, 2022
No.	Title	Lyrics	Music	Artist	Length
1.	"1000won Lawyer" (천원짜리 변호사)	Kim Seong-yul	Kim Seong-yul	Kim Kyung-ho	2:10
2.	"1000won Lawyer" (천원짜리 변호사; Inst.)		Kim Seong-yul		2:10
Total length:					4:20

=== Part 5 ===
Released on October 22, 2022
No.	Title	Lyrics	Music	Artist	Length
1.	"Wadadada" (와다다다)	Tiger JK	Tiger JK; J.SEASON; BC3000; Kim Hyun-jun	Tiger JK	2:42
2.	"Wadadada" (와다다다; Inst.)		Tiger JK; J.SEASON; BC3000; Kim Hyun-jun		2:42
Total length:					5:25

== Viewership ==
One Dollar Lawyer : South Korea viewers per episode (millions)

Season	Episode number												Average
Season	1	2	3	4	5	6	7	8	9	10	11	12	Average
1	1.505	1.602	2.279	2.288	2.805	2.502	2.626	2.785	2.933	2.711	2.729	2.860	2.469

Source: Audience measurement performed nationwide by Nielsen Korea.

Ep.	Original broadcast date	Average audience share		
Ep.	Original broadcast date	Nielsen Korea		TNmS
Ep.	Original broadcast date	Nationwide	Seoul	Nationwide
1	September 23, 2022	8.2% (4th)	8.8% (3rd)	6.9% (9th)
2	September 24, 2022	8.5% (2nd)	8.8% (2nd)	7.8% (3rd)
3	September 30, 2022	12.9% (3rd)	13.5% (2nd)	N/A
4	October 1, 2022	12.0% (2nd)	12.6% (2nd)	9.5% (2nd)
5	October 7, 2022	14.9% (2nd)	15.1% (1st)	12.0% (3rd)
6	October 8, 2022	13.4% (2nd)	13.6% (2nd)	11.3% (2nd)
7	October 14, 2022	14.5% (1st)	14.6% (1st)	11.4% (3rd)
8	October 15, 2022	15.0% (2nd)	15.6% (2nd)	11.3% (2nd)
9	October 22, 2022	14.6% (2nd)	15.1% (2nd)	11.0% (2nd)
10	October 29, 2022	13.7% (2nd)	14.1% (2nd)	10.7% (2nd)
11	November 5, 2022	13.6% (2nd)	14.4% (2nd)	10.0% (2nd)
12	November 11, 2022	15.2% (1st)	15.8% (1st)	N/A
Average		13.0%	13.5%	— (Note: Due to some ratings not recorded, the exact average rating is unknown.)
In the table above, the blue numbers represent the lowest ratings and the red numbers represent the highest ratings.; N/A denotes ratings that were not released.

== Awards and nominations ==
Name of the award ceremony, year presented, category, nominee of the award, and the result of the nomination
Award ceremony	Year	Category	Nominee / Work	Result	Ref.
SBS Drama Awards	2022	Grand Prize (Daesang)	Namkoong Min	Nominated	
SBS Drama Awards	2022	Director's Award	Namkoong Min	Won	
SBS Drama Awards	2022	Top Excellence Award, Actor in a Miniseries Romance/Comedy Drama	Namkoong Min	Nominated	
SBS Drama Awards	2022	Excellence Award, Actor in a Miniseries Romance/Comedy Drama	Choi Dae-hoon	Nominated	
SBS Drama Awards	2022	Excellence Award, Actress in a Miniseries Romance/Comedy Drama	Kim Ji-eun	Won	
SBS Drama Awards	2022	Best Performance	Lee Chung-ah	Won	
SBS Drama Awards	2022	Best Supporting Actor in a Miniseries Romance/Comedy Drama	Park Jin-woo	Won	
SBS Drama Awards	2022	Best Supporting Actress in a Miniseries Romance/Comedy Drama	Gong Min-jung	Won	
