= Jo Yeon-hee =

South Korean actress (born 1977)

- Born: Cho Seon-joo; October 2, 1977 (age 49); Jeonju, South Korea
- Other name: Jo Seon-ju
- Education: Dongguk University (Department of Theater and Film)
- Occupation: Actress
- Years active: 1997–present
- Agent: Relationship Entertainment
- Known for: One Dollar Lawyer; Mr. Queen; One the Woman
- Spouse: Han Dong-hwa (m. 2018)

Jo Yeon-hee is a South Korean actress. She is known for her roles in dramas such as One Dollar Lawyer, Mr. Queen, One the Woman and Black Dog: Being A Teacher. She also appeared in movies The Houseguest and My Mother, Someone Behind You, Veteran and Miracle: Letters to the President.

== Filmography ==
=== Television series ===
Year	Title	Role	Ref.
1998	Soonpoong Clinic	Mi-young	
1999	Happy Together	Joo Hee-ju	
1999	Tomato	Ms. Song	
2004	Sweet 18	Hyuk-jun's college junior	
2006	High Kick!	Yoga instructor	
2007	Surgeon Bong Dal-hee	Seon-ju	
2009	My Too Perfect Sons	Child guardian	
2015	The Missing	Shin Ji-sub's wife	
2016	Squad 38	Baek Sung-il's wife	
2016	Secrets of Women	Nurse Kim	
2017	Bad Guys 2	Sung Ji-soo	
2019	Black Dog: Being A Teacher	Kim Yi-boon	
2020	Mr. Queen	Queen Dowager Jo	
2021	One the Woman	Heo Jae-hee	
2022	One Dollar Lawyer	Oh Min-ah	
2022	Blind	Jo In-suk	
2023	My Demon	Kim Se-ra	
2024	Wonderful World	Mok Ryeon	
2025	The Winning Try	Kim Soo-hyun	

=== Film ===
Year	Title		Role
Year	English	Korean	Role
2007	Swindler in My Mom's House	사랑방 손님과 어머니	Worker at a wedding shop
2007	Someone Behind You	두 사람이다	Kim Jee-sun
2015	Veteran	베테랑	Contract worker
2016	Curtain Call	커튼콜	Cheo Min-ki
2016	The Wailing	곡성	Bar hostess
2021	Miracle: Letters to the President	기적	Villager

== Awards and nominations ==
Name of the award ceremony, year presented, category, nominee of the award, and the result of the nomination
Award ceremony	Year	Category	Result	Ref.
3rd Korean Drama Awards	2010	Rookie of the Year Award	Won	
