= Again My Life =

2022 South Korean television series

- Promotional poster
- Hangul: 어게인 마이 라이프
- RR: Eogein mai raipeu
- MR: Ŏgein mai raip'ŭ
- Genre: Fantasy; Action
- Created by: Studio S (production plan); Viu (production investment)
- Based on: Again My Life by Lee Hae-nal
- Written by: J; Kim Yul
- Directed by: Han Chul-soo; Kim Yong-min
- Starring: Lee Joon-gi; Lee Geung-young; Kim Ji-eun; Jung Sang-hoon
- Music by: Kim Jong-chun (Philstring)
- Country of origin: South Korea
- Original language: Korean
- No. of episodes: 16

Production
- Executive producers: Lee Kwang-sun; Hong Chul-min (CP)
- Producers: Ahn Ji-hyun; Shin Sang-yoon; Kim Hyun-woo
- Production companies: Samhwa Networks; Kross Pictures
- Budget: ₩5.6 billion

Original release
- Network: SBS TV
- Release: April 8 – May 28, 2022

Again My Life (Korean: 어게인 마이 라이프) is a 2022 South Korean television series starring Lee Joon-gi, Lee Geung-young, Kim Ji-eun and Jung Sang-hoon. It is based on a web novel of the same title published on KakaoPage, which was also released as a webtoon. It aired on SBS TV from April 8 to May 28, 2022, every Friday and Saturday at 22:00 (KST). It is also available for streaming on Viu in selected regions.

== Synopsis ==
A young prosecutor, who gets killed while trying to take down a powerful politician, is given a chance to start a new life for justice.

== Cast ==
=== Main ===
- Lee Joon-gi as Kim Hee-woo

A resilient and determined prosecutor.

- Lee Geung-young as Cho Tae-sub

A corrupt politician who runs his own crime cartel.

- Kim Ji-eun as Kim Hee-ah

The youngest daughter of the chairman of conglomerate Cheonha Group. She is an intelligent and kind-hearted student, who later fell for Hee-woo after befriending him.

- Jung Sang-hoon as Lee Min-soo

Hee-woo's law school senior and friend. He is a former medical student who first transferred to the arts, then music and finally, to law school.

=== Supporting ===
==== People at the Prosecutors' Office ====
- Choi Kwang-il as Kim Seok-hoon

A corrupt prosecutor who is set to become the attorney general, and serves under Tae-sub. He is Han-mi's biological father but treats her coldly and disdainfully.

- Hong Bi-ra as Kim Kyu-ri

Hee-woo's friend from law school who later becomes his ally against Tae-sub.

- Kim Hyung-mook as Jang Il-hyun

An ambitious but greedy prosecutor who is Hee-woo's law school senior.

- Na In-gyu as Oh Min-guk

An investigator.

- Kim Chul-gi as Jeon Seok-gyu

A chief prosecutor who is demoted for his investigation of the corrupted higher-ups; he later became Hee-woo's ally.

- Kim Young-jo as Ji Seong-ho

A prosecutor who is Seok-gyu's junior and later becomes one of Hee-woo's trusted allies.

- Kim Jin-woo as Choi Kang-jin

A prosecutor who is an unscrupulous and corrupt character behind his clean and upright image.

- Lee Kyung-min as Goo Seung-hyuk

A hot-blooded and passionate prosecutor who is Hee-woo's partner from the training institute, and Kyu-ri's junior.

==== People around Hee-woo ====
- Kim Jae-kyung as Kim Han-mi

A former delinquent and friend of Hee-woo, who eventually becomes a reporter and assists Hee-woo in his fight against corrupt officials. She is Seok-hoon's illegitimate child but is treated coldly by him.

- Park Chul-min as Kim Chan-sung

Hee-woo's father, who died in an unsolved car accident fifteen years ago in the original timeline.

- Kim Hee-jeong as Lee Mi-ok

Hee-woo's mother, who died in an unsolved car accident fifteen years ago in the original timeline.

- Ji Chan as Park Sang-man

A high school student who later became Hee-woo's ally. In the original timeline, Hee-woo helps re-open the case of Sang-man's father, who was wrongfully sent to jail for murder.

- Joo Woo as Kang Sung-jae

A martial artist.

- Lee Jae-woo as Kang Min-seok

An upright and righteous lawyer who is the brother of Hee-woo's high school teacher.

- Choi Min as Lee Yeon-seok

Hee-woo's strong assistant.

- Lee Soon-jae as Woo Yong-soo

A rich businessman who mentors Hee-woo regarding real estate investments.

- Yoo Dong-geun as Hwang Jin-yong

An upright and incorruptible congressman who is Tae-sub's political enemy.

==== People around Tae-sub ====
- Cha Joo-young as Han Ji-hyun

Tae-sub's secretary. She is actually a Grim Reaper who, at Hee-woo's death, helps resurrect him and send him back to fifteen years in his past for a second chance to bring Tae-sub to justice once and for all.

- Jeon Kook-hwan as Kim Gun-young

Hee-ah's father who is the chairman of Cheonha Group.

- Kim Young-hoon as Kim Jin-woo

Tae-sub's lackey who is loyal to him and is likewise cold-hearted and corrupt.

- Hyun Woo-sung as Dr. K

A hired assassin who helps Tae-sub to kill any people who get into his way. He was revealed to be Ji-hyun's brother but he has no memory of her as a result of a fire orchestrated by Tae-sub.

- Hyun Bong-sik as Park Dae-ho

A banker who assists Tae-sub in managing his corruption funds.

==== Others ====
- Jeon Seung-bin as Kim Yong-jun

Gun-young's eldest son and Hee-ah's older brother.

- Moon Jeong-gi as Kim Seong-jun

Gun-young's youngest son and Hee-ah's younger brother.

- Cha Ji-hyeok as Park Jin-hyuk

Hee-ah's loyal bodyguard. His real name is Park Jong-hyuk and was a former special agent who continues to use his alias Park Jin-hyuk while working under Hee-ah.

=== Extended ===
- Kim Do-kyung as Moon Sung-hwan

Hee-woo's friend who is an app developer.

- Han Ki-chan as Kim Young-il

Seok-hoon's son.

- Joo Sae-byeok as Do Ah-jin

A croupier.

- Park Na-eun as Sung Jin-mi

Il-hyun's girlfriend who is a famous musician and the chairman of an arts foundation.

- Heo Hyun-do as Lee Joo-suk

A medical student who was wrongfully accused of murdering his pregnant girlfriend.

- Lee Yeon-doo as Jung Se-yeon

A lobbyist.

- Lee Do-gyeom as Park Seung-wan
- Han Dam-hee

=== Special appearances ===
- Bae Jong-ok as Chun Ho-ryung

Chairman of Jiwang Group who plans to build her business and political empire.

- Lee Kyu-han as Lawyer Cha

A violent and corrupt lawyer who was Chun's ally.

== Episodes ==
| No. | Title | Original release date |
|---|---|---|
| 1 | "Episode 1" | April 8, 2022 |
Kim Hee-woo is a prosecutor who is passionate towards justice and righteousness. He is a former MMA fighter who enrolled into Hankuk University Law School after re-taking the college entrance exam for the third time, and graduated. Against the orders of his superiors, he investigates the corruption crimes committed by politician Cho Tae-sub, who is a ruthless, corrupt and cold-blooded man beneath his kind-hearted and respectable image. Hee-woo is unfortunately outsmarted by Tae-sub, who not only silenced the witnesses but also sent his trusted assassin "Dr. K" to kill Hee-woo. Shortly after Hee-woo died, his soul meets a female Grim Reaper, who offers Hee-woo a second chance to relive his life, on the condition that he must bring Tae-sub to justice and give him the punishment he deserves in his lifetime; she added that they will eventually meet again in Hee-woo's second life. After accepting the request, Hee-woo finds himself back to fifteen years ago in 2007, when he is a high school graduate and part-timer who is re-taking his college entrance exam for the first time. He also reunites with his parents Kim Chan-sung and Lee Mi-ok, who both are still alive at the time before their deaths.
| 2 | "Episode 2" | April 9, 2022 |
Hee-woo manages to avert the death of his parents from an unsolved drunk-driving car accident which occurred fifteen years ago. This time however, the driver dies due to Hee-woo's intervention. The driver's identity turns out to be Cho Hyun-seok, Tae-sub's son and a future congressman. Hee-woo realises that the reason behind the unsolved accident was due to Tae-sub using his power to cover up his son's accident, thus feeling more hatred towards Tae-sub. Hee-woo also make use of his knowledge of the past to save his Hagwon classmates Kim Han-mi and Kim Kyu-ri from their respective unfortunate fates, earning their gratitude and trust. Hee-woo's change of personality brings surprise and incredulity to his parents and acquaintances. With his own efforts and Kyu-ri's help, Hee-woo manages to pass the college entrance exam and enter the Hankuk University Law School three years earlier than he originally did, much to the delight and pride of his parents. At the college, Hee-woo befriends both Lee Min-soo, a law faculty freshman who transferred from the arts, and Kim Hee-ah, a kind-hearted and righteous freshman of the computer engineering faculty. Hee-woo finds Hee-ah familiar but cannot recall if they ever met before in his first life.
| 3 | "Episode 3" | April 15, 2022 |
Hee-woo receives word that Kyu-ri, who is absent since the start of semester, is planning to drop out because of her father's bankruptcy and his failing health. Desperate to help Kyu-ri, and to accumulate his fortune, Hee-woo invests in real estate. During his first auction visit, Hee-woo first met Woo Yong-soo, a rich businessman, and after several attempts, Hee-woo becomes Yong-soo's disciple, which helped him to solve Kyu-ri's problems and enable her to return to school. Meanwhile, Hee-woo tutors Han-mi in re-taking her college entrance exam, and on one night, he accidentally found out from a drunken Han-mi that she was the illegitimate child of the current deputy chief prosecutor Kim Seok-hoon, a loyalist of Tae-sub's faction, leading to him feeling sympathetic towards Han-mi. Meanwhile, as he becomes a star student at law school, Hee-woo was invited by his corrupt seniors Jang Il-hyun and Choi Kang-jin to join the secret law club, where it consist of only the gifted students and affluent students, and has connections to those who dealt with the law and politics, including Tae-sub. His membership allows him to overhear Tae-sub's plan to make Yong-soo bankrupt and he informs Yong-soo on time, thus thwarting Tae-sub's plan.
| 4 | "Episode 4" | April 16, 2022 |
When Tae-sub returns as an alumni to give a speech at Hee-woo's law school, Hee-woo was overwhelmed with shock to see Tae-sub's secretary Han Ji-hyun, who has an exact resemblance to the Grim Reaper he met after his death. After the end of Tae-sub's speech, Hee-woo comes forward and expresses his gratitude to Ji-hyun, and states that he will keep his promise, which made Ji-hyun confused over his words. After a drinks session, Hee-woo spots a man secretly following Hee-ah and fights him, but Hee-ah stops them and states that the "stalker" is actually her personal bodyguard Park Jin-hyuk. Hee-woo finally recalls that Hee-ah is the daughter of the chairman of Cheonha Group, a conglomerate which Tae-sub will take full control of in the future. Remembering this and Hee-ah's dislike of Tae-sub, Hee-woo becomes resolved to gain Hee-ah's trust in order to prevent Tae-sub's schemes. Hee-woo was introduced by Min-soo to Moon Sung-hwan, Min-soo's ex-classmate from medical school. As Sung-hwan expresses his plan to develop a messaging app, Hee-woo remembers from the past that Sung-hwan would become disgraced by Cheonha Telecommunications (led by Tae-sub's lackey and corporate spy Kim Chan-il), and later, he is able to prevent Sung-hwan's fate.
| 5 | "Episode 5" | April 22, 2022 |
Park Sang-man, a final-year high school student, was heartbroken to see his father being arrested for the brutal murder of his long-time friend Hong In-pyo despite his innocence. Hee-woo, who knew the identity of the real killer, decides to help Sang-man, and through his investigations, Hee-woo provides the evidence to his senior Jang Il-hyun, who arrests the real killer Lee Sun-young (In-pyo's unfaithful wife) and her boyfriend and acquits Sang-man's father. Sang-man thus became grateful and he befriends Hee-woo. On the day of Hee-woo's military enlistment, he and Hee-ah, who is set to study abroad, meet up and both of them part ways after promising to see each other again. Seven years later, Hee-woo becomes a prosecutor and he requests to be assigned to the Kimsan branch, where he met Jeon Seok-gyu, a righteous prosecutor who was demoted for his investigation of the corrupt higher-ups. During his first days of work, Hee-woo investigates an illegal gambling den operated by the Yuchae Gang and he enlists the help of Sang-man and his new colleagues to infiltrate the gambling den and arrest the whole gang, including their skilled fighter Lee Yeon-seok. This made Seok-gyu angered at Hee-woo taking matters in his hands.
| 6 | "Episode 6" | April 23, 2022 |
After Seok-gyu calmed down and told Hee-woo to be mindful of his safety in the future, Hee-woo interrogated the Yuchae gang members and their leader Moon Gu-joon, who all denied their crimes despite the overwhelming evidence. When the three Kimsan officials, who receive bribes from the gang, went to confront Seok-gyu and angrily demands Hee-woo to drop the case, Hee-woo shows them a news report, which cover the Yuchae gang's crimes and he frightens the officials by purposely mentioning that there is a name list of those involved in bribery. After a drinks session, Seok-gyu finally trusts Hee-woo, who proposes a plan to let Seok-hoon to approve the involvement of Seoul prosecutors in investigating the Yuchae Gang's offences, and Hee-woo fabricates to Seok-hoon that he and Seok-gyu will work under him once Seok-hoon finish the investigations. Seok-hoon agreed to Hee-woo's plan, and Hee-woo enlists the help of Kyu-ri, Min-soo, his training institute partner Gu Seung-hyuk and other colleagues to organize an undercover operation to capture the remaining suspects. All the while when Hee-woo was investigating the Yuchae gang, he found time to reunite with Hee-ah, who returned to South Korea after completing her studies not long ago.
| 7 | "Episode 7" | April 29, 2022 |
The operation was a success, and Hee-woo manages to obtain Gu-joon's confession and crucial evidence of the Kimsan officials' corruption. However, of all the three, one of them (an ally of Tae-sub) was left out of the list on Seok-hoon's orders. During interrogation, Hee-woo helps Yeon-seok, who dropped out of high school to pay off Yeon-seok's mother's undischarged medical fees. This made Yeon-seok grateful to him and they became friends. Eventually, Seok-hoon fulfills his promise to Hee-woo, and he went back to Seoul with Seok-gyu, and another prosecutor Ji Seong-ho. Meanwhile, Hee-ah told her father she did not wish to inherit his position as CEO of Cheonha Group as she did not want to become rivals with her siblings. After his return, Hee-woo detects that his office is wiretapped by Seok-hoon, and informs Seok-gyu and Seong-ho to be careful. On Seok-hoon's arrangement, Hee-woo finally meets Tae-sub, who admires his talent. Later, in order to cover up the corruption case of businessman and CEO of Mirae Motors Jeon Il-bo, Il-hyun interrogates Lee Ju-seok, a medical student who was falsely accused of killing his pregnant girlfriend. Seeing that Il-hyun wanted to frame an innocent man, Hee-woo plans to expose Il-hyun's immoral acts.
| 8 | "Episode 8" | April 30, 2022 |
Hee-woo personally interrogates Ju-seok and decides to help him to prove his innocence. Hee-woo obtains evidence proving Ju-seok's innocence, and he persuades Min-seok to defend Ju-seok. Hee-woo find out that in the neighbourhood where the murder took place, a psychopathic sexual offender Kang Deok-goo resides in it. Deducing that Deok-goo is the killer and knowing that Deok-goo would be caught for the murders of 20 women three years from now, Hee-woo asks Kyu-ri and Seung-hyuk to help tail Deok-goo and they confront him at a field where he just disposed of the corpse of his latest victim. With Yeon-seok's help, the pair arrested Deok-goo, who confessed to killing Ju-seok's girlfriend and three other women, which allowed Ju-seok to be acquitted in the midst of his first trial. Il-hyun was greatly disgraced for both this case and his failure to cover up Il-bo's crime. Meanwhile, Seok-gyu uncovers evidence of corruption committed by Il-hyun's girlfriend Sung Jin-mi and her art foundation and Il-hyun asks Seok-gyu to drop the case by using Seok-hoon's name to threaten Seok-gyu. Since the office itself was wiretapped, Seok-hoon was angered at Il-hyun's actions and granted Seok-gyu an approval for open investigations and allows Hee-woo arrest Il-hyun.
| 9 | "Episode 9" | May 6, 2022 |
Hee-woo carried out Seok-hoon's orders to arrest Il-hyun. In his interrogation, Il-hyun reveals to Hee-woo that Kang-jin actually engages in sex tapes and corruption, which made Kang-jin alarmed as he happens to hear the live recording of the interrogation. Kang-jin confronts Il-hyun, and still boiling with rage over Hee-woo capturing him, Il-hyun tells Kang-jin to capture Hee-woo. At the same time, Kyu-ri and Seung-hyuk met Kang-jin's girlfriend Cho Yoon-ah, an actress who was forced into drug consumption and prostitution by Kang-jin and his father Choi Soo-hyuk (director of Yoon-ah's entertainment agency). After a drinks session, Hee-woo and Min-soo rescues a girl Hwang Hye-jin from being killed, and she turns out to be the daughter of opposition politician and assemblyman Hwang Jin-yong, a righteous yet powerless political enemy of Tae-sub. Hee-woo meets up with Jin-yong and gains his trust; he passes to Jin-yong the list of public figures who engaged in corruption. At Hee-ah's side, her father's health was failing and she faces a hard choice of fulfilling her father's wishes to inherit Cheonha Group, and she becomes more wary of Tae-sub, who is plotting to gain influence over Cheonha by manipulating her eldest brother Yong-jun as the next-in-line CEO.
| 10 | "Episode 10" | May 7, 2022 |
At the National Assembly, Jin-yong exposes the namelist of the public figures who evaded mandatory military service and received sexual bribery, which causes a huge public outcry against the government. Kang-jin becomes increasingly fearful that his corruption may be exposed as the prosecution begins to investigate his father's company. Kang-jin also tries to seek protection from Tae-sub like the officials who were involved in the scandal. Tae-sub later discards the people he find worthless while shielding his key allies. Kang-jin was similarly spared from the risk of prosecution due to Tae-sub's intervention. Despite the setbacks, Hee-woo remains unfazed and becomes more resolved to take down Tae-sub. Hee-woo becomes in charge of Il-hyun's trial, he successfully sought a conviction for Il-hyun, who was consequently sentenced to seven years' imprisonment. At Hee-ah's home, there are conflicts arising within her family, including her two brothers Yong-jun and Seong-jun arguing. Hee-ah, who became part of Cheonha's management team, later goes on a date with Hee-woo, and Hee-ah gladly left with a teddy bear gifted by Hee-woo. Subsequently, after arguing with his siblings, Yong-jun meets up with Tae-sub, who seeks to use Yong-jun as a puppet to take full control of Cheonha Group.
| 11 | "Episode 11" | May 13, 2022 |
Tae-sub approaches Hee-ah's ailing father Kim Gun-young at the hospital and tries to make the latter approve Yong-jun as his successor, but Gun-young still insisted on making Hee-ah as his true successor. In retaliation, Tae-sub uses his influence to get Gun-young's youngest son Seong-jun arrested. Afterwards, Gun-young confronts Tae-sub, threatening to expose his corruption. Hence, Tae-sub sent out Dr. K and his adviser Kim Jin-woo, who both plotted with the hospital staff to cause Gun-young's death. At Gun-young's funeral, Hee-woo offers his condolences to Hee-ah and promises to help her, and Hee-woo implores Hee-ah to protect Cheonha while he will take down Tae-sub. Upon Gun-young's death, Tae-sub begins to carry out his plans to control Cheonha. Hee-woo plans to take down Seok-hoon, and Tae-sub's fund manager Park Dae-ho (owner of Bando Bank). Hee-woo purposely mentioned investigating the Bando Bank (where Tae-sub kept his secret funds) to Seok-hoon, who refuses to approve it at first, but Seok-hoon eventually relents due to his jealousy towards Tae-sub's newfound favour of his rival Yoon Jong-gi and fear of losing his candidacy for attorney general. Seeing that Seok-hoon's ties with Tae-sub began to deteriorate, Hee-woo approaches Tae-sub and expresses his intention to take down Seok-hoon.
| 12 | "Episode 12" | May 14, 2022 |
Tae-sub, who feels impressed at Hee-woo's audacity, accepts Hee-woo's proposal and help him. Hee-woo asked for Tae-sub's secretary Ji-hyun to accompany him when he visited Il-hyun in prison, where he convinces Il-hyun to testify against Seok-hoon. Hee-woo recorded the confession and forwarded a copy to Kyu-ri, who investigates with Seung-hyuk and Min-soo. Meanwhile, Tae-sub asked Seok-hoon to bring Hee-woo with him in their next meeting, and he became more impressed with Hee-woo's potential. Hee-ah, who took a more active role in Cheonha Group, discovers evidence of the corruption behind JQ Constructions, the company of Seok-hoon's legitimate son Kim Young-il, and the plot of Dae-ho (and Tae-sub) to acquire the stocks of Cheonha Group, and shared it with Hee-woo, who also distributed the evidence to his allies. Later, Kyu-ri and Seung-hyuk arrests Young-il, enraging Seok-hoon who perceives it as a move from Jong-gi. Seung-hyuk was lured into an abandoned site where Dr. K attacks him and tries to force him to promise to stop investigating JQ Constructions (as it was linked to Bando Bank and Tae-sub). Seung-hyuk refuses, and just when Dr. K was about to murder Seung-hyuk, a masked Hee-woo arrives on time to confront Dr. K.
| 13 | "Episode 13" | May 20, 2022 |
Hee-woo manages to hold off his own during the fight until Dr. K escapes. Hee-woo convinces Kyu-ri and Seung-hyuk to drop the JQ case as he will recapture Young-il. Hee-woo meets up with Tae-sub, stating he has asked for the case to be dropped but stating he will track down Seung-hyuk's "unidentified" attacker. Despite liking Hee-woo, Tae-sub becomes cautious of the latter's intelligence and deduction. Hee-woo and Jin-yong devises a plan to take down both corrupt opposition politician Kim Jung-taek and Seok-hoon. Sang-man, who is investing in JQ Constructions (to acquire Cheonha stocks), he finds out the biggest investor was a rich businessman named Park Jong-hyuk, and Hee-woo finds out it was Hee-ah's bodyguard posing as the investor. Hee-ah told Hee-woo that she earlier planned to use Jin-hyuk's real name to invest in JQ to disable Tae-sub's plan. Later, during Seok-hoon's attorney general hearing, he faces the shocking news of his son re-arrested for corruption. With Tae-sub's orders, Seok-hoon was forced to approve his son's arrest, and Jung-taek is also caught. Min-soo, who offers to drink with Hee-woo, states he will be working under Tae-sub and against Hee-woo but before that, he will help Hee-woo to take down Seok-hoon first.
| 14 | "Episode 14" | May 21, 2022 |
Hee-woo successfully arrests Seok-hoon, after the revelation of the corruption committed by Seok-hoon and his family, as well as Han-mi's relationship with Seok-hoon being made public. Seok-hoon decides to admit to all charges after Hee-woo reminded him of the pain Seok-hoon caused to Han-mi throughout her life. As such, Jong-gi became the next attorney general. Tae-sub decides to research Hee-woo's weakness since Hee-woo already knew his. Tae-sub meets up with Hee-ah, threatening her that there will be investigations launched against Cheonha if the successor is not selected, but Hee-ah remains unfazed. Hee-ah plans to have Cheonha acquire JQ Constructions, and Sang-man discussed with the higher-ups of JQ on the acquisition. Hee-woo manages to ask the financial supervisory service director to impose a penalty on Bando Bank to not allow them able to withdraw more money to acquire JQ, thus foiling the plan of Dae-ho, whom Hee-woo selects as his next target. Meanwhile, Seok-gyu was approached by Tae-sub to become the next chief prosecutor, on one condition that he should arrest Jin-yong. Despite rejecting it at first, Seok-gyu reluctantly gave in but he asks that he should be guaranteed the prosecutorial rights of decision. Hee-woo becomes shocked at Seok-gyu's decision.
| 15 | "Episode 15" | May 27, 2022 |
Hee-woo captures Dae-ho's henchman, whom he investigated having made illegal loans and kidnapped a missing man. Seok-gyu arrives to escort the man into custody, and it is revealed he is still loyal to Hee-woo as he wanted to use the post to help him catch Dae-ho. As Dae-ho's crimes were revealed publicly, Tae-sub send Dr. K and Jin-woo to kill Dae-ho. Hee-woo saves Dae-ho before the pair's arrival and took him into custody. Tae-sub sends Jung Se-yeon, an illegal arms dealer to seduce Hee-woo but Hee-woo sees through the plan and asks her to work for him instead. Also, Sang-man became CEO of JQ after successfully acquiring it, and Tae-sub wants to meet him. Hee-woo went in Sang-man's place and declares he will bring Tae-sub to justice. Having realised Hee-woo cares deeply for Sang-man, Tae-sub sent his henchmen to threaten Sang-man into betraying Hee-woo, but Sang-man refuses and he was pushed off a building. As Sang-man is in a coma, Tae-sub uses his influence to isolate Hee-woo by relocating his allies to other prosecutorial branches. Min-soo, who receives Tae-sub's order to frame Hee-woo as a corrupt prosecutor in exchange for a bright political future, approaches Hee-woo in his office.
| 16 | "Episode 16" | May 28, 2022 |
Hee-woo spreads evidence of Jin-woo's crimes to the news and Jin-woo commits suicide. After Hee-woo resigns and joins Jin-yong's political party, Hee-woo asks Min-soo (still loyal to Hee-woo) to spread rumours that he is a school bully while he will announce his engagement to Hee-ah and counter the rumours. Hee-woo met up with Ji-hyun, finally telling her that his promise to her was to expose Tae-sub's true colours. Ji-hyun, who was aware of Tae-sub's viciousness and long since wanted to expose him, decides to trust Hee-woo and work with him. During the candidacy debate on live television, Hee-woo exposes Tae-sub's crimes, while Ji-hyun also exposes Tae-sub in another simultaneous live interview. Tae-sub escapes while Dr. K pursues Ji-hyun. Hee-woo, Yeon-seok and Hee-woo's MMA trainer Kang Sung-jae manage to subdue Dr. K, who was arrested for the murders he helped Tae-sub to commit; Ji-hyun also decides to surrender herself. Tae-sub, now disgraced, finally realises his defeat and he committed suicide. After some time, conglomerate Jiwang Group began to recruit Tae-sub's former allies (who were eventually released from prison) as its chairman craves to build her political power bloc in South Korea. Hee-woo decides to continue fighting corruption as he watches afar.

== Production ==
=== Casting ===
On November 5, 2021, it was announced that actor Lee Kyu-han decided to leave the series for personal reasons. Later on November 10, it was confirmed that Jung Sang-hoon would replace Lee Kyu-han.

=== Filming ===
On December 31, 2021, it was reported that on December 25, one of the supporting actors tested positive for COVID-19. Filming was halted on that day, and all cast members and production staff were immediately tested for the contagion. As there were no additional confirmed cases, Again My Life resumed filming the next day.

On March 4, 2022, Kim Ji-eun's agency confirmed that the actress was diagnosed with COVID-19 on February 27. She was an asymptomatic case, and was scheduled to be released from self-quarantine on March 6.

On April 18, 2022, it was confirmed that actor Lee Joon-gi had contracted COVID-19, and filming was suspended. Filming resumed on April 25 after his recovery.

== Original soundtrack ==
=== Part 1 ===
Released on April 9, 2022
| No. | Title | Lyrics | Music | Artist | Length |
|---|---|---|---|---|---|
| 1. | "What the Ggang" (무슨 깡으로) | Kim Jong-cheon; Kim Ye-il; Kissxs | Kim Jong-cheon; Kim Ye-il | Yoon Do-hyun | 3:00 |
| 2. | "What the Ggang" (무슨 깡으로; Inst.) | | Kim Jong-cheon; Kim Ye-il | | 3:00 |
| Total length: | | | | | 6:00 |

=== Part 2 ===
Released on April 16, 2022
| No. | Title | Lyrics | Music | Artist | Length |
|---|---|---|---|---|---|
| 1. | "Bring It On" | Kinzium; Park Da-eun | Kinzium; Park Da-eun | Son Seung-yeon | 3:17 |
| 2. | "Bring It On" (Inst.) | | Kinzium; Park Da-eun | | 3:17 |
| Total length: | | | | | 6:34 |

=== Part 3 ===
Released on April 23, 2022
| No. | Title | Lyrics | Music | Artist | Length |
|---|---|---|---|---|---|
| 1. | "Burn" | The Rose | The Rose | Park Do-joon | 2:45 |
| 2. | "Burn" (Inst.) | | The Rose | | 2:45 |
| Total length: | | | | | 5:30 |

=== Part 4 ===
Released on April 30, 2022
| No. | Title | Lyrics | Music | Artist | Length |
|---|---|---|---|---|---|
| 1. | "Till the End" | Kim Beom-ju; Kim Si-hyuk | Kim Beom-ju; Kim Si-hyuk | U Sung-eun | 4:00 |
| 2. | "Till the End" (Inst.) | | Kim Beom-ju; Kim Si-hyuk | | 4:00 |
| Total length: | | | | | 8:00 |

=== Part 5 ===
Released on May 7, 2022
| No. | Title | Lyrics | Music | Artist | Length |
|---|---|---|---|---|---|
| 1. | "Alone" | Brick | Brick; Ban Estin; Young Sick | GB9 | 3:24 |
| 2. | "Alone" (Inst.) | | Brick; Ban Estin; Young Sick | | 3:24 |
| Total length: | | | | | 6:48 |

=== Part 6 ===
Released on May 14, 2022
| No. | Title | Lyrics | Music | Artist | Length |
|---|---|---|---|---|---|
| 1. | "Shadow" (그림자) | Brick; Hanhae | Brick; Ban Estin; Young Sick | Hanhae & Kissxs | 3:01 |
| 2. | "Shadow" (그림자; Inst.) | | Brick; Ban Estin; Young Sick | | 3:01 |
| Total length: | | | | | 6:02 |

=== Part 7 ===
Released on May 21, 2022
| No. | Title | Lyrics | Music | Artist | Length |
|---|---|---|---|---|---|
| 1. | "Tragedy" | Kim Seong-yoon; Clef Crew | Kim Seong-yoon; Warming; Clef Crew | Sondia | 4:30 |
| 2. | "Tragedy" (Inst.) | | Kim Seong-yoon; Warming; Clef Crew | | 4:30 |
| Total length: | | | | | 9:00 |

=== Part 8 ===
Released on May 28, 2022
| No. | Title | Lyrics | Music | Artist | Length |
|---|---|---|---|---|---|
| 1. | "Killing Me" | The Rose | The Rose; Honey Noise | Ha Dong Qn | 3:10 |
| 2. | "Killing Me" (Inst.) | | The Rose; Honey Noise | | 3:10 |
| Total length: | | | | | 6:20 |

== Viewership ==
Again My Life : South Korea viewers per episode (millions)

| Season | Episode number | | | | | | | | | | | | | | | | Average |
| Season | 1 | 2 | 3 | 4 | 5 | 6 | 7 | 8 | 9 | 10 | 11 | 12 | 13 | 14 | 15 | 16 | Average |
|---|---|---|---|---|---|---|---|---|---|---|---|---|---|---|---|---|---|
| 1 | 1.004 | 1.143 | 1.496 | 1.367 | 1.807 | 1.691 | 1.779 | 1.634 | 1.848 | 1.823 | 1.913 | 1.921 | 1.991 | 1.861 | 2.214 | 2.031 | 1.720 |

Source: Audience measurement performed nationwide by Nielsen Korea.

Average TV viewership ratings
| Ep. | Original broadcast date | Average audience share | | |
| Ep. | Original broadcast date | Nielsen Korea | | TNmS |
| Ep. | Original broadcast date | Nationwide | Seoul | Nationwide |
|---|---|---|---|---|
| 1 | April 8, 2022 | 5.8% (10th) | 6.0% (9th) | N/A |
| 2 | April 9, 2022 | 6.4% (6th) | 6.8% (4th) | N/A |
| 3 | April 15, 2022 | 8.1% (5th) | 8.5% (4th) | 6.3% (9th) |
| 4 | April 16, 2022 | 7.0% (4th) | 7.0% (4th) | 6.4% (4th) |
| 5 | April 22, 2022 | 9.7% (4th) | 10.0% (3rd) | 7.8% (5th) |
| 6 | April 23, 2022 | 8.5% (4th) | 8.4% (3rd) | 7.7% (3rd) |
| 7 | April 29, 2022 | 9.6% (5th) | 9.6% (3rd) | 8.1% (6th) |
| 8 | April 30, 2022 | 8.6% (3rd) | 8.8% (3rd) | 7.5% (3rd) |
| 9 | May 6, 2022 | 10.1% (3rd) | 10.1% (3rd) | 8.4% (5th) |
| 10 | May 7, 2022 | 9.6% (2nd) | 9.3% (2nd) | 9.4% (2nd) |
| 11 | May 13, 2022 | 10.7% (2nd) | 10.8% (2nd) | 7.5% (3rd) |
| 12 | May 14, 2022 | 9.5% (2nd) | 10.0% (2nd) | 8.6% (2nd) |
| 13 | May 20, 2022 | 11.0% (3rd) | 11.1% (3rd) | 9.0% (4th) |
| 14 | May 21, 2022 | 9.9% (2nd) | 10.2% (2nd) | N/A |
| 15 | May 27, 2022 | 12.0% (2nd) | 12.0% (2nd) | 9.3% (4th) |
| 16 | May 28, 2022 | 10.5% (2nd) | 10.2% (2nd) | 9.4% (2nd) |
| Average | | 9.2% | 9.3% | 8.1% (Note: This average ratings is calculated based on the published ratings, the exact average ratings is unknown due to multiple ratings not published.) |
In the table above, the blue numbers represent the lowest published ratings and the red numbers represent the highest published ratings.; N/A denotes ratings that were not released.

== Awards and nominations ==
Name of the award ceremony, year presented, category, nominee of the award, and the result of the nomination
| Award ceremony | Year | Category | Nominee / work | Result | Ref. |
|---|---|---|---|---|---|
| SBS Drama Awards | 2022 | Grand Prize (Daesang) | Lee Joon-gi | Nominated | |
| SBS Drama Awards | 2022 | Top Excellence Award, Actor in a Miniseries Fantasy Drama | Lee Joon-gi | Won | |
| SBS Drama Awards | 2022 | Excellence Award, Actress in a Miniseries Genre/Fantasy Drama | Kim Ji-eun | Nominated | |
| SBS Drama Awards | 2022 | Best Supporting Actor in a Miniseries Genre/Fantasy Drama | Choi Kwang-il | Nominated | |
| SBS Drama Awards | 2022 | Best Supporting Actress in a Miniseries Genre/Fantasy Drama | Kim Jae-kyung | Won | |
| SBS Drama Awards | 2022 | Best Supporting Actress in a Miniseries Genre/Fantasy Drama | Cha Joo-young | Nominated | |
