= Kim Ji-eun =

South Korean actress (born 1993)

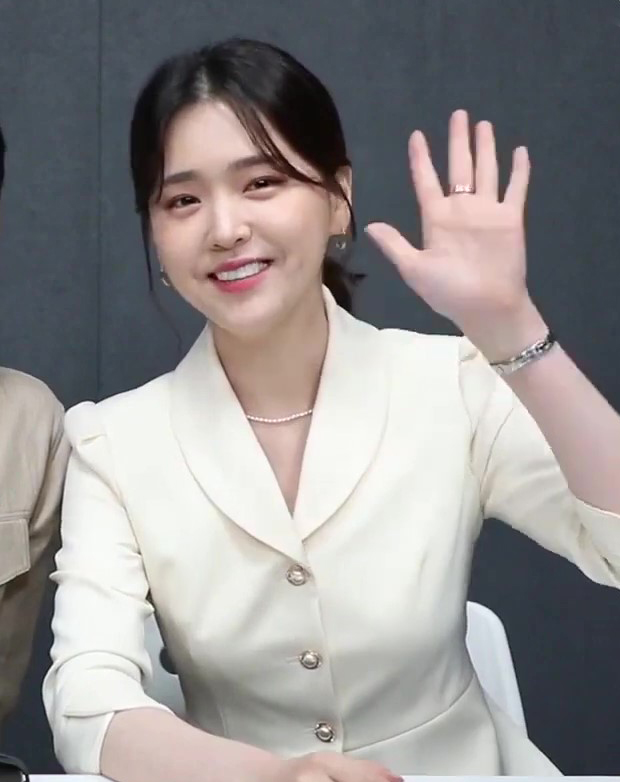
- Kim in April 2022
- Born: October 9, 1993 (age 32); Incheon, South Korea
- Education: Cheongju University
- Occupation: Actress
- Years active: 2016–present
- Agent: Namoo Actors
- Height: 166 cm (5 ft 5 in)

Korean name
- Hangul: 김지은
- Hanja: 金智恩
- RR: Gim Jieun
- MR: Kim Chiŭn

Kim Ji-eun (Korean: 김지은; born October 9, 1993) is a South Korean actress. She first became recognized through the 2021 television series The Veil.

== Early life ==
Kim Ji-eun was born in Incheon, South Korea on October 9, 1993. Before she started acting, she enrolled in Department of Theater course at Cheongju University.

== Career ==
=== 2016: Beginnings ===
Kim officially began to work in the entertainment industry as a commercial model for Bacchus-F in 2016. In order to attract the attention of actors management agencies, Kim participated in some music videos filming, worked as crew member, and did independent auditions.

=== 2019–present: Mainstream debut and rising popularity ===
Kim's first casting after she signed to her first agency HB Entertainment, was a 2019 film Long Live the King. In the same year, she played her first major role in OCN's crime suspense series Hell Is Other People.

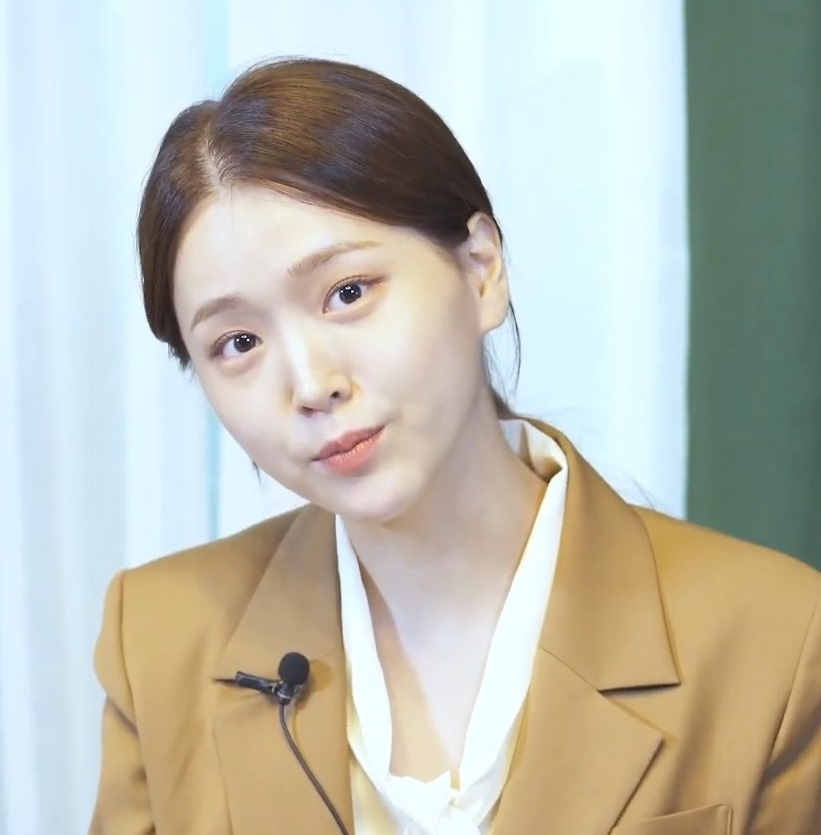
Kim in September 2021

In 2021, Kim gained recognition with her role as a NIS agent who joined the bureau due to a personal agenda in MBC's espionage thriller The Veil.

Shortly after The Veil, Kim acted as the female lead for the first time in the 2022 SBS action fantasy Again My Life, as the only daughter of a conglomerate who got embroiled in the battle of succession. In the same year, she portrayed a legal trainee coming from a prestigious family of law practitioners in another series by SBS, the legal comedy One Dollar Lawyer.

Kim reunited with the director of Again My Life in 2023 ENA's mystery-thriller Longing for You as a violent crime prosecutor. She then focused on hosting and variety shows for a while, having appeared on Inkigayo, the 2023 SBS Entertainment Awards (in which she also won an award), Neighborhood Cool House, Nineteen to Twenty. Kim ranked at 13th place in the annual Forbes Korea Power Celebrity 40 in 2023, the second highest ranking for actresses in the list after Park Eun-bin.

In 2024, Kim came back to acting with three series: workplace fantasy thriller web series Branding in Seongsu as the company's youngest marketing team leader, tvN's slice of life romance Love Next Door as a passionate paramedic, and Channel A's historical romance Check-in Hanyang as a cross-dressing girl working as an intern at the biggest guest house in the Kingdom.

In November 2024, Kim signed with the new agency Namoo Actors.

== Filmography ==
=== Film ===
| Year | Title | Role | Ref. |
|---|---|---|---|
| 2015 | Tattoo | Girlfriend | |
| 2018 | The Drug King | Choi Jin-pil's wife | |
| 2019 | Long Live the King | Joon | |

=== Television series ===
| Year | Title | Role | Notes | Ref. |
|---|---|---|---|---|
| 2018 | Nice Witch | Wang Ji-yeong | | |
| 2018 | Lovely Horribly | Lee Soo-jeong | | |
| 2018 | Children of Nobody | Min-joo | | |
| 2019 | Doctor Prisoner | Oh Min-jeong | Cameo (Episode 10, 12) | |
| 2019 | Hell Is Other People | Min Ji-eun | | |
| 2021 | The Veil | Yoo Je-yi | | |
| 2022 | Again My Life | Kim Hee-ah | | |
| 2022 | One Dollar Lawyer | Baek Ma-ri | | |
| 2023 | Longing for You | Go Young-joo | | |
| 2024 | Love Next Door | Jeong Mo-eum | | |
| 2024–2025 | Check-in Hanyang | Hong Deok-soo | | |
| 2025 | Dynamite Kiss | Baek Ma-ri | Cameo (Episode 9) | |

=== Television shows ===
| Year | Title | Role | Notes | Ref. |
|---|---|---|---|---|
| 2023 | Inkigayo | Special MC | with Monsta X's Hyungwon | |
| 2023 | Neighborhood Cool House | Co-host | with Kim Seong-joo and Oh Sang-jin | |

=== Web series ===
| Year | Title | Role | Ref. |
|---|---|---|---|
| 2017 | The Best Moment To Quit Your Job | Hyun-yi | |
| 2019 | I Have Three Boyfriends | Ra-hee | |
| 2024 | Branding in Seongsu | Kang Na-eon | |

=== Web shows ===
| Year | Title | Role | Notes | Ref. |
|---|---|---|---|---|
| 2023 | Nineteen to Twenty | Co-host | with Kyuhyun and Lee Su-hyun | |

=== Music video appearances ===
| Year | Song title | Artist | Ref. |
|---|---|---|---|
| 2016 | "Sugarfree Girl" (무설탕소녀) | Coin Classic | |
| 2016 | "So-So" (쏘쏘) | Baek A-yeon | |
| 2016 | "Promise (I'll Be)" | 2PM | |
| 2017 | "Lovesick" (사랑앓이) | F.T. Island (feat. Kim Na-young) | |
| 2017 | "What Can I Do" (좋은걸 뭐 어떡해) | Day6 | |
| 2017 | "I Loved You" | Day6 | |
| 2017 | "When you love someone" (그렇더라고요) | Day6 | |
| 2017 | "Hibernation" (겨울잠) | Yesung | |
| 2017 | "Ghood Morning" (오늘도) | Junoflo | |
| 2018 | "Premonition" (느낌) | Paul Kim | |
| 2018 | "Sudden Shower" (소나기) | Yong Jun-hyung (feat. 10cm) | |
| 2021 | "Unthinkable" (말이 안 돼) | F.T. Island | |

=== Hosting ===
| Year | Title | Notes | Ref. |
|---|---|---|---|
| 2023 | 2023 SBS Entertainment Awards | with Lee Sang-min and Lee Hyun-yi | |

== Accolades ==
=== Awards and nominations ===
Name of the award ceremony, year presented, category, nominee of the award, and the result of the nomination
| Award ceremony | Year | Category | Nominee / Work | Result | Ref. |
|---|---|---|---|---|---|
| Asia Model Awards | 2021 | New Star Awards | The Veil | Won | |
| Korea Drama Awards | 2023 | Excellence Award, Actress | Longing for You | Won | |
| MBC Drama Awards | 2021 | Best New Actress | The Veil | Won | |
| SBS Drama Awards | 2022 | Excellence Award, Actress in a Miniseries Romance/Comedy Drama | One Dollar Lawyer | Won | |
| SBS Drama Awards | 2022 | Excellence Award, Actress in a Miniseries Genre/Fantasy Drama | Again My Life | Nominated | |
| SBS Entertainment Awards | 2023 | Rookie Award | Inkigayo, Neighborhood Cool House | Won | |
| Seoul International Drama Awards | 2020 | Best Actress in Hallyu drama | I Have Three Boyfriends | Nominated | |

=== Listicles ===
Name of publisher, year listed, name of listicle, and placement
| Publisher | Year | Listicle | Placement | Ref. |
|---|---|---|---|---|
| Forbes | 2023 | Korea Power Celebrity | 13th | |
