= The Undateables (South Korean TV series) =

2018 South Korean television series

- Promotional poster
- Hangul: 훈남정음
- Lit.: Hoon-nam and Jung-eum
- RR: HunnamJeongeum
- MR: HunnamChŏngŭm
- Genre: Romance comedy
- Written by: Lee Jae-yoon
- Directed by: Kim Yoo-jin
- Starring: Namkoong Min; Hwang Jung-eum
- Country of origin: South Korea
- Original language: Korean
- No. of episodes: 32

Production
- Executive producers: Kim Jung-hee; Yoo Byung-sul
- Cinematography: Bae Hong-soo; Lee Moo-jin; Moon Ji-seob
- Editors: Park Sung-hee; Oh Jin-ah; Kim Min-ji
- Camera setup: Single-camera
- Running time: 35 minutes
- Production companies: Mong-jak-so Co., Ltd. 51K

Original release
- Network: SBS TV
- Release: May 23 – July 19, 2018

The Undateables (Korean: 훈남정음; RR: Hunnamjeongeum) is a 2018 South Korean television series starring Namkoong Min and Hwang Jung-eum. It aired on SBS from May 23 to July 19, 2018 on Wednesdays and Thursdays at 22:00 (KST) for 32 episodes.

== Synopsis ==
It is a romantic comedy about Kang Hoon-nam who knows everything there is to know about love and Yoo Jung-eum whose biggest dream is to be loved and get married. The two of them get off on the wrong foot, first five years ago at the airport when Hoon-nam witnesses Jung-eum pursuing her then-boyfriend at the airport, and then in the present when they share the same client Oh Doo-ri and are initially misled into thinking the other is competition (although their employers are in fact in different industries). Coincidentally, two of Hoon-nam's friends get hooked up with two of Jung-eum's friends; Yook Ryong and Coach Yang, then followed by Lee Su-ji with Choi Jun-soo.

However Su-ji is longtime friends with Hoon-nam from Australia, while Jun-soo has been the best friend and mentor to Jung-eum for 30 years while also renting at her father's place for the last few years. When Su-ji returns from Australia to Korea, then Hoon-nam has to leave his home for her, and ends up living with Jung-eum and Jun-soo much to the latter's chagrin since Jun-soo harbors a secret crush on Jung-eum..

After things initially don't work out, Hoon-nam and Jung-eum coincidentally cross paths again as both try to sign up Mr. Kim as a client. Mr. Kim has been dating their mutual client Doo-ri. Hoon-nam then signs up with Jung-eum's agency as a client. Su-ji pressures Jung-eum to manipulate the match so she is paired up with Hoon-nam, as she wants to marry him although his heart is not for Su-ji despite their other compatibilities.

== Cast ==
=== Main ===
- Namkoong Min as Kang Hoon-nam

The director of a toy gallery, and a relationship expert who doesn't believe in love.

- Hwang Jung-eum as Yoo Jung-eum

A diving athlete-turned "relationship helper" who dreams of love and marriage, but has given them up in the face of reality.

- Choi Tae-joon as Choi Jun-soo

A clinic doctor who is Jung-eum's best friend.

- Oh Yoon-ah as Coach Yang Sun-hee

Coach of the National Diving Team.

- Jo Dal-hwan as Charlie

A magazine editor.

- Jung Moon-sung as Yook Ryong

Hoon-nam's cousin.

=== Supporting ===
- Nam Kyung-eub as Kang Jung-do

Hoon-nam's father. A politician.

- Shim Hye-jin as Ko Eun-nim

Hoon-nam's stepmother.

- Lee Moon-sik as Yoo Seung-ryul

Jung-eum's father. A positive and optimistic man who serves as a motivation to his daughter.

- Lee Joo-yeon as Lee Su-ji / Lee Susie

Daughter of the President of Korea Swimming Association, who came to Korea from Australia to search for Hoon-nam.

- Myung Ji-yun
- Baek Ji-won as Bong Sun-hwa

Jung-eum's manager at the matchmaking company.

- Seo Dong-won
- Seo Eun-woo
- Jin Ye-sol
- Kang Hui as Model

=== Special appearance ===
- Jung Yong-joo as Oh Doo-ri

Jung-eum's potential client.

- Ji Il-joo
- Kim Kwang-kyu as Kim So-wool
- Nash Ang as a Co-seller

== Production ==
- The first script reading was held on April 2, 2018 at SBS Ilsan Production Center in Tanhyun, South Korea.
- Filming began in early April.
- A press conference was held on June 7, 2018 at SBS Ilsan Production Center in Tanhyun, South Korea.

== Original soundtrack ==
The Undateables OST

Soundtrack album by Various Artists
- Released: 2018
- Genre: Soundtrack
- Languages: Korean; English
- Labels: 935 Entertainment; OGAM Entertainment

=== Part 1 ===
Released on May 23, 2018
No.	Title	Lyrics	Music	Artists	Length
1.	"Only U"	Nick; Sammy	Nick; Sammy	Nick & Sammy	3:46
Total length:					3:46

=== Part 2 ===
Released on May 30, 2018
No.	Title	Lyrics	Music	Artists	Length
1.	"Your Name Is..." (너의 이름을...)	Ha Geun-young; Kim Kyeong-beom	Ha Geun-young; Kim Kyeong-beom; Kim Ji-hwan	Yeonjung (Cosmic Girls)	4:06
2.	"Your Name Is... (Inst.)" (너의 이름을... (Inst.))		Ha Geun-young; Kim Kyeong-beom; Kim Ji-hwan		4:06
Total length:					8:12

=== Part 3 ===
Released on June 6, 2018
No.	Title	Lyrics	Music	Artists	Length
1.	"Need My Heart To Pound" (두근이 필요해)	Park Jeong-wook; Kim Ha-rang; Kim Joon-il	Park Jeong-wook; Kim Ha-rang; Kim Joon-il	Alice (Hello Venus)	3:15
2.	"Need My Heart To Pound (Inst.)" (두근이 필요해 (Inst.))		Park Jeong-wook; Kim Ha-rang; Kim Joon-il		3:15
Total length:					6:30

=== Part 4 ===
Released on June 13, 2018
No.	Title	Lyrics	Music	Artists	Length
1.	"If Not You" (너 아니면)	Good Choice; KamDongis	Seo Jae-ha; Kim Young-sung; KamDongis	Huh Gak	4:15
2.	"If Not You (Inst.)" (너 아니면 (Inst.))		Seo Jae-ha; Kim Young-sung; KamDongis		4:15
Total length:					8:30

=== Part 5 ===
Released on June 20, 2018
No.	Title	Lyrics	Music	Artists	Length
1.	"I Might Have Loved You First" (먼저 사랑할지 몰라)	Good Choice; Red Socks	Red Socks	Son Seung-yeon	3:16
2.	"I Might Have Loved You First (Inst.)" (먼저 사랑할지 몰라 (Inst.))		Red Socks		3:16
Total length:					6:32

=== Part 6 ===
Released on June 27, 2018
No.	Title	Lyrics	Music	Artists	Length
1.	"I Can Go Back" (돌아가도 돼)	POPKID; Kim Seung-joon	POPKID; Kim Seung-joon	Bumkey	3:40
2.	"I Can Go Back (Inst.)" (돌아가도 돼 (Inst.))		POPKID; Kim Seung-joon		3:40
Total length:					7:20

=== Part 7 ===
Released on July 11, 2018
No.	Title	Lyrics	Music	Artists	Length
1.	"Slowly"	Ha Geun-young; Kim Kyeong-beom	Ha Geun-young; Kim Kyeong-beom; Kim Ji-hwan	Soobin (Cosmic Girls)	3:11
2.	"Slowly (Inst.)"		Ha Geun-young; Kim Kyeong-beom; Kim Ji-hwan		3:11
Total length:					6:22

== Ratings ==
- In the table below, the blue numbers represent the lowest ratings and the red numbers represent the highest ratings.
- NR denotes that the drama did not rank in the top 20 daily programs on that date.
- TNmS stop publishing their report from June 2018.

Ep.	Original broadcast date	Average audience share			
Ep.	Original broadcast date	TNmS		AGB Nielsen	
Ep.	Original broadcast date	Nationwide	Seoul	Nationwide	Seoul
1	May 23, 2018	6.1% (NR)	6.9%	5.3% (NR)	6.1% (15th)
2	May 23, 2018	5.4% (NR)	6.3%	5.2% (NR)	6.1% (15th)
3	May 24, 2018	6.9% (17th)	7.2%	4.9% (NR)	5.3% (16th)
4	May 24, 2018	6.0% (NR)	6.3%	5.0% (19th)	5.3% (16th)
5	May 30, 2018	3.9% (NR)	4.0%	3.7% (NR)	3.8% (NR)
6	May 30, 2018	5.0% (NR)	5.2%	4.5% (NR)	4.7% (NR)
7	May 31, 2018	5.3% (NR)	5.5%	3.9% (NR)	4.1% (NR)
8	May 31, 2018	5.4% (NR)	5.6%	4.1% (NR)	4.3% (NR)
9	June 6, 2018	3.6%	3.8%	3.2% (NR)	3.4% (NR)
10	June 6, 2018	4.3%	4.5%	3.9% (NR)	4.1% (NR)
11	June 7, 2018	5.7%	5.9%	4.1% (NR)	4.3% (NR)
12	June 7, 2018	4.8%	5.0%	4.4% (NR)	4.6% (NR)
13	June 14, 2018 (Note: No episodes were aired on June 13 due to election day news coverage.)	5.6%	5.8%	3.5% (NR)	3.7% (NR)
14	June 14, 2018	4.5%	4.6%	3.6% (NR)	3.8% (NR)
15	June 20, 2018	4.0%	4.8%	3.3% (NR)	4.2% (NR)
16	June 20, 2018	4.6%	5.4%	4.4% (NR)	5.1% (NR)
17	June 21, 2018	4.7%	5.8%	4.5% (NR)	5.6% (16th)
18	June 21, 2018	4.4%	5.6%	4.5% (NR)	5.7% (14th)
19	June 28, 2018 (Note: No episodes were aired on June 27 due to coverage of the 2018 FIFA World Cup Group F match between South Korea and Germany, and aired the next day. The episodes were pushed earlier to 21:30 that day due to coverage of the FIFA World Cup 2018 Group H match between Japan and Poland.)	3.5%	4.4%	3.1% (NR)	3.9% (NR)
20	June 28, 2018	4.8%	5.6%	4.4% (NR)	5.2% (NR)
21	July 4, 2018	2.7%	3.3%'	2.4% (NR)	3.0% (NR)
22	July 4, 2018	3.4%	4.2%	3.0% (NR)	3.8% (NR)
23	July 5, 2018	3.1%	3.9%	2.8% (NR)	3.6% (NR)
24	July 5, 2018	3.2%	4.1%	2.8% (NR)	3.7% (NR)
25	July 11, 2018	3.2%	3.7%	2.8% (NR)	3.3% (NR)
26	July 11, 2018	3.3%	4.0%	2.9% (NR)	3.5% (NR)
27	July 12, 2018	3.2%	3.8%	2.8% (NR)	3.6% (NR)
28	July 12, 2018	3.5%	4.2%	3.1% (NR)	3.9% (NR)
29	July 18, 2018	2.3%	2.9%	2.1% (NR)	2.4% (NR)
30	July 18, 2018	2.4%	3.0%	2.1% (NR)	2.5% (NR)
31	July 19, 2018	3.0%	3.7%	2.6% (NR)	3.3% (NR)
32	July 19, 2018	3.2%	4.1%	2.8% (NR)	3.7% (NR)
Average		3.6%	4.3%	3.1%	3.9%

== Awards and nominations ==
Year	Award	Category	Nominee	Result	Ref.
2018	SBS Drama Awards	Top Excellence Award, Actress in a Wednesday-Thursday Drama	Hwang Jung-eum	Nominated	
