= 14th Korea Drama Awards =

2023 edition of award ceremony

- Official poster
- Awarded by: Korea Drama Festival Organizing Committee; Ministry of Culture, Sports and Tourism; Gyeongnam Province; Jinju City
- Date: October 14, 2023
- Site: Gyeongnam Culture and Arts Center, Grand Performance Hall, Jinju, South Gyeongsang Province, South Korea
- Hosted by: Gong Seo-young; Park Chan-min
- Official website: Korea Drama Awards

Highlights
- Best Drama Serial: The Glory
- Grand Prize (Daesang): Lee Sung-min
- Lifetime achievement: Kil Yong-woo

Television coverage
- Network: Seokyeong Broadcasting; Korea Drama Festival YouTube channel

The 14th Korea Drama Awards is an awards ceremony for excellence in television in South Korea. It was held on October 14, 2023, as an event of Korea Drama Festival at Gyeongnam Culture and Arts Center, Grand Performance Hall, Jinju. It was hosted by Gong Seo-young and Park Chan-min.

In the award ceremony the group Rocket Punch and pop singer Go Hyun-joo gave congratulatory performances. The grand prize was awarded to Lee Sung-min for Shadow Detective 2 and The Glory won the best drama award.

== Nominations and winners ==
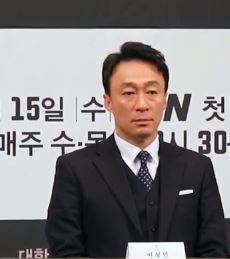
Grand Prize (Daesang) winner Lee Sung-min

The nominations were announced on October 11, 2023, for the dramas of all genres airing domestically from October 2022 to September 2023.

| Grand Prize (Daesang) | Best Drama |
|---|---|
| Lee Sung-min – Shadow Detective 2; Kim Hye-soo – Under the Queen's Umbrella; Song Hye-kyo – The Glory; Han Suk-kyu – Dr. Romantic 3 | The Glory |
| Best Director | Achievement Award |
| Ahn Gil-ho – The Glory | Kil Yong-woo |
| Top Excellence Award, Actor | Top Excellence Award, Actress |
| Oh Jung-se – Revenant | Kim Sun-a – Queen of Masks |
| Excellence Award, Actor | Excellence Award, Actress |
| Kim Sung-kyun – D.P. 2; Lee Sang-yi – Bloodhounds | Kim Ji-eun – Longing for You |
| Best Supporting Actor | Best Supporting Actress |
| Ahn Se-ha – King the Land | So Joo-yeon – Dr. Romantic 3 |
| Best New Actor | Best New Actress |
| Park Ji-hoon – Weak Hero Class 1 | Lee Yeon – Delightfully Deceitful |
| Global Star Award | KDF Award |
| Bae Hyun-sung – Miraculous Brothers | Jung Hee-tae – Reborn Rich |
| Hot Star Award Male | Hot Star Award Female |
| Ko Kyu-pil – Heartbeat | Jung Yoo-min – Celebrity |
