= Namkoong Min =

South Korean actor (born 1978)

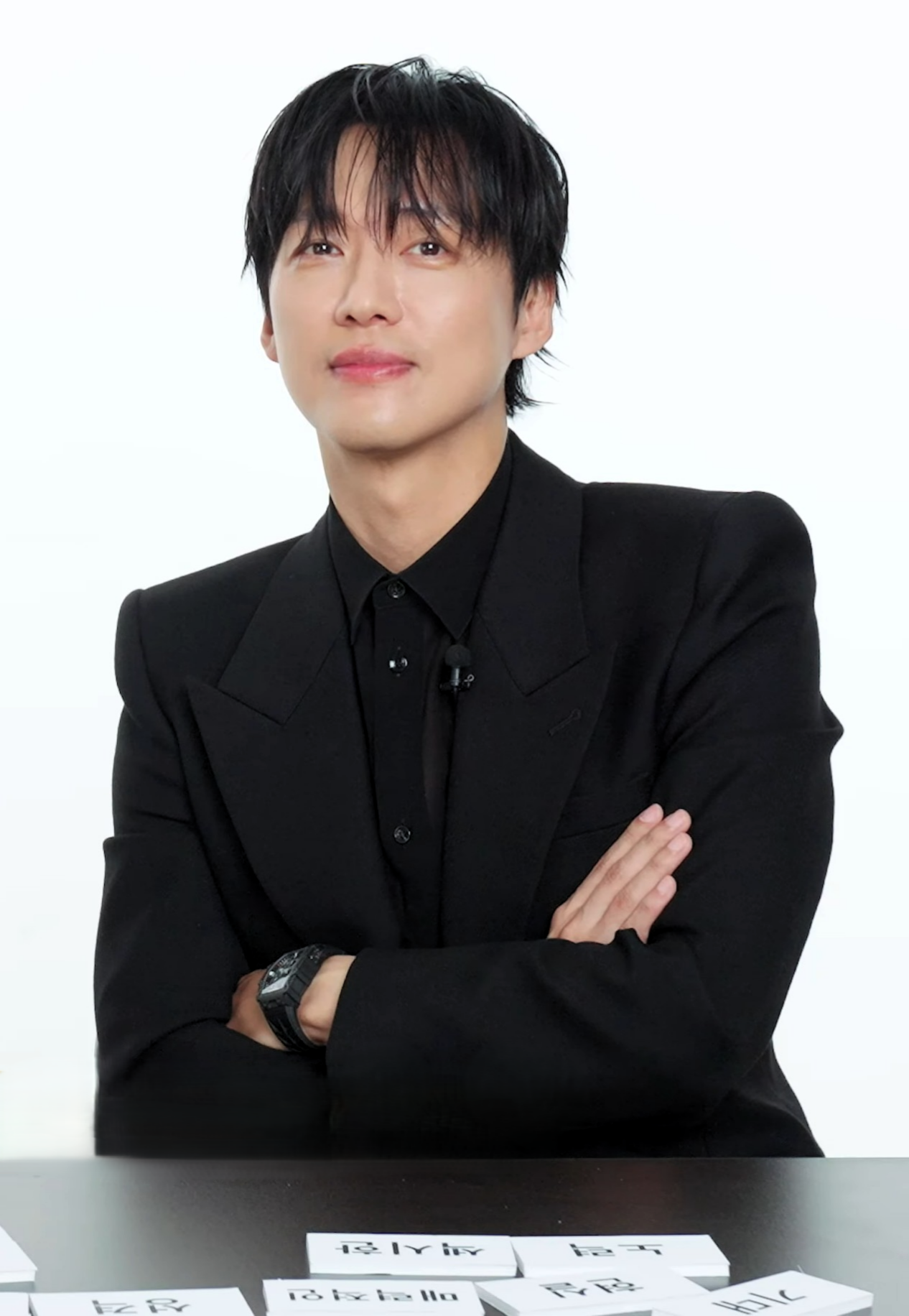
- Namkoong in 2025
- Born: March 12, 1978 (age 48); Seoul, South Korea
- Education: Chung-Ang University (BSE in Mechanical Engineering)
- Occupations: Actor; director; screenwriter
- Years active: 1999–present
- Agent: 935 Entertainment
- Height: 177 cm (5 ft 10 in)
- Spouse: Jin Ah-reum (m. 2022)
- Children: 1
- Awards: Full list

Korean name
- Hangul: 남궁민
- Hanja: 南宮珉
- RR: Namgung Min
- MR: Namgung Min
- Website: 935ent.com

Namkoong Min (Korean: 남궁민, born March 12, 1978) is a South Korean actor, director, and screenwriter. He first gained recognition with neo-noir film A Dirty Carnival (2006), and has since given notable performances in Remember (2015–2016), Beautiful Gong Shim (2016), Good Manager (2017), Hot Stove League (2019–2020), and My Dearest (2023).

He won the Grand Prize (Daesang) (Note: A Daesang (Korean: 대상), which translates to "Grand Prize", is the highest honor given out at South Korean award ceremonies.) at the 2020 SBS Drama Awards for Hot Stove League; the drama also gained Namkoong his third Best Actor nomination at the Baeksang Arts Awards. The next year, he received the Grand Prize at the 2021 MBC Drama Awards for The Veil. In 2023, he again received the Grand Prize at the 2023 MBC Drama Awards for My Dearest.

== Early life ==
Namkoong was born on March 12, 1978, in Seoul. He has a brother, Namkoong Yoon. His father, Namkoong Hwon, was a principal of Sinneung Middle School (2005–2009). Namkoong was educated at Daeseong High School in Eunpyeong-gu, Seoul, and Ilsan Seongsa Elementary School. He graduated from the Chung-Ang University with a bachelor's degree in Mechanical Engineering. After his graduation on August 31, 2006, he worked as a Social Service Agent for 18 months at Korea Army Training Center in Nonsan.

== Career ==
Namkoong Min debuted as an actor in the film Bungee Jumping of Their Own as the protagonist's best friend, and subsequently appeared in the movie Bad Guy as the female lead's boyfriend. In 2002, Namkoong featured in the sitcom Dae Bak Family and attracted attention with his performance. Since then, he appeared in the television series and single-act dramas such as Rose Fence, Pearl Necklace, Mould Flower and After Love. Namkoong also became known as "little Bae Yong-joon" due to his resemblance with the actor. In 2004, Namkoong starred in the KBS daily drama My Lovely Family, which garnered over 30% in ratings and led to increased recognition for the actor.

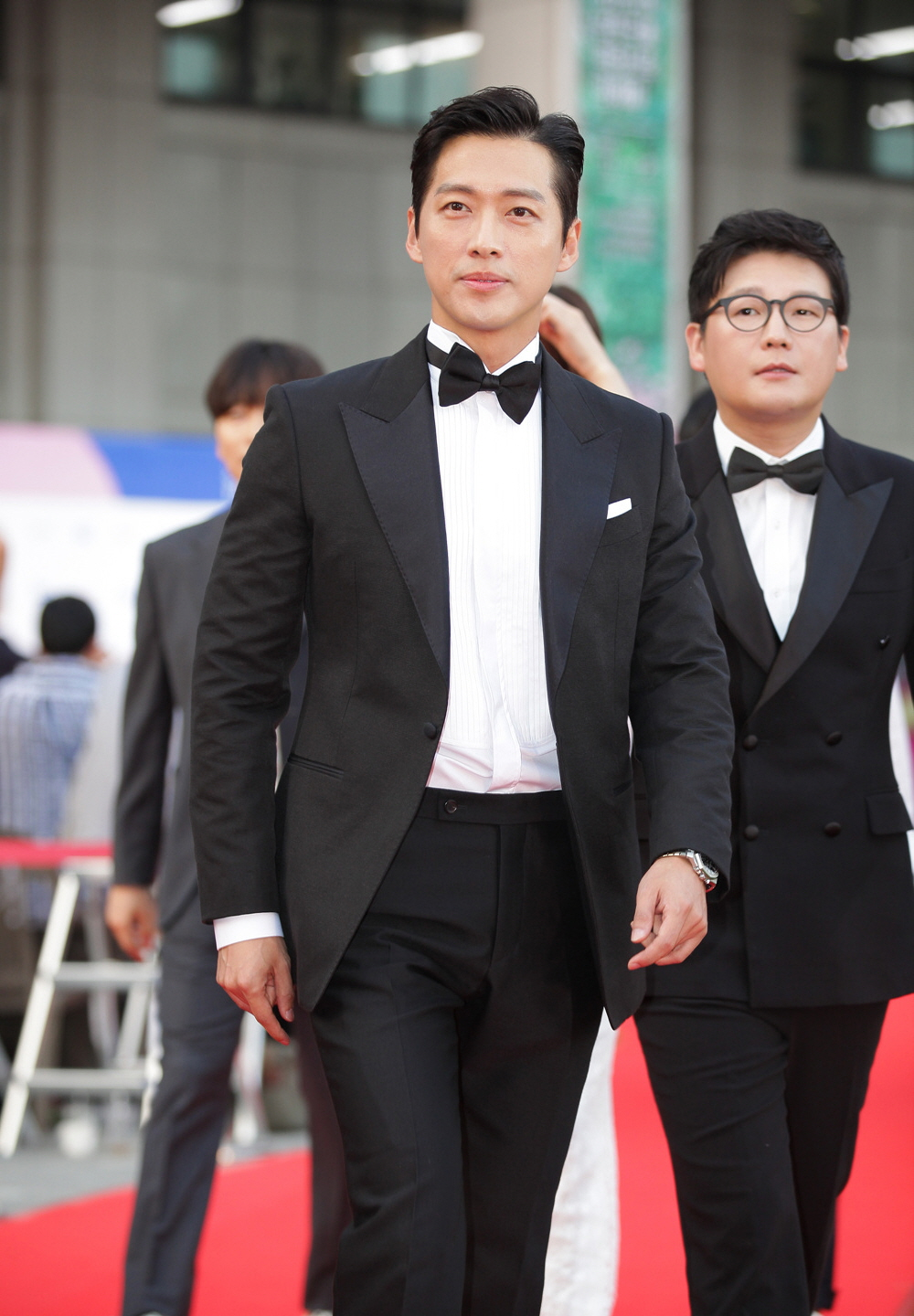
Namkoong in 2017

Namkoong subsequently received acclaim with neo-noir film A Dirty Carnival (2006), and drew widespread notice for his performance in melodrama Listen to My Heart (2011). Namkoong subsequently returned with a changed mindset and new-found determination. His efforts paid off when he achieved recognition for his villainous role as a serial killer in A Girl Who Sees Smells (2015), and he won the Best Villain Award at the annual 2016 DramaFever Awards. Since then, he has received praise for his performances in legal thriller Remember: War of the Son (2015–2016) and romantic comedy Beautiful Gong Shim (2016).

Namkoong's breakout role was in the hit comedy drama Good Manager (2017), where he played the central protagonist. Namkoong was praised for his "perfect amalgamation of character creation and acting" which contributed to the success of the drama. He then starred in SBS's legal thriller Distorted (2017), playing a trashy tabloid reporter with no work ethics.

In 2018, Namkoong starred alongside Listen to My Heart co-star Hwang Jung-eum in the romantic comedy series The Undateables.

In 2019, Namkoong starred in the medical prison drama Doctor Prisoner.

From 2019 to 2020, Namkoong starred in the sports television series Hot Stove League. The television series received positive reviews for its high quality script and attained high ratings. He played the role of the new leader of the last-place team, the Dreams. Hot Stove League won 56th Baeksang Arts Awards 2020 for best drama. Through that drama, he also received his first daesang/grand prize in his career from 2020 SBS Drama Awards.

In September 2021, Namkoong decided to renew his contract with 935 Entertainment. This is the third contract renewal.

== Personal life ==
Namkoong has been in a relationship with model Jin Ah-reum since late 2015, who he met while filming movie Light My Fire as a director and actress. They married in a private ceremony on October 7, 2022, at Hotel Shilla in Seoul. The ceremony was attended by the couple's closest family and friends, including actors Jung Moon-sung as host, and TVXQ performed the congratulatory song. Min's wife announced on June 18, 2026, that she is expecting the couples first child. On July 26, 2026, the couple welcomed a son.

== Other activities ==
=== Endorsements ===
On February 6, 2023, Namkoong introduced as the new model of WELLMADE, a fashion editing shop.

== Filmography ==
=== Film ===
| Year | Title | Role | Notes | Ref. |
|---|---|---|---|---|
| 2001 | Bungee Jumping of Their Own | Kim Sung-chul | | |
| 2002 | Bad Guy | Hyun-soo | | |
| 2006 | A Dirty Carnival | Min-ho | | |
| 2007 | Beautiful Sunday | Min-woo | | |
| 2015 | Hot Service: A Cruel Hairdresser (화끈한 써비스: 어느 잔인한 미용사의 | —N/a | credited as production staff | |
| 2015 | Light My Fire (라이트 마이 파이어) | —N/a | short film; credited as director/screenwriter | |
| 2016 | Moonlit Motive (夜色撩人) | Chowbei | Chinese film | |
| 2017 | Part-Time Spy | Min-seok | | |

=== Television series ===
| Year | Title | Role | Notes | Ref. |
|---|---|---|---|---|
| 2002 | Dae Bak Family | Namkoong Min | | |
| 2003 | Rose Fence | Han Dong-hyun | | |
| 2003 | Drama City – "To William" | Yoon Joon-ho | | |
| 2003 | Wedding Story – My Love My Oppa | Sung-soo | | |
| 2003 | Pearl Necklace | Hwang Joon-ho | | |
| 2003 | HDTV Literature – "Mould Flower" | Ki-hoon | | |
| 2004 | Drama City – "After Love" | Eun-jae | | |
| 2004 | My Lovely Family | Ahn Jin-gook | | |
| 2005 | My Rosy Life | Dr. Ji Bak-sa | | |
| 2006 | One Fine Day | Kang Dong-ha | | |
| 2009 | Iris | | Cameo | |
| 2010 | Becoming a Billionaire | Chu Woon-seok | | |
| 2011 | Listen to My Heart | Jang Joon-ha / Bong Ma-roo | | |
| 2012 | KBS Drama Special – "Still Picture" | Kim Hyun-soo | | |
| 2012 | Cheongdam-dong Alice | So In-chan | Guest (Episodes 1–3) | |
| 2013 | Hur Jun, The Original Story | Yoo Do-ji | | |
| 2013 | Unemployed Romance | Kim Jong-dae | | |
| 2014 | I Need Romance 3 | Kang Tae-yoon | | |
| 2014 | 12 Years Promise | Yoo Joon-soo | | |
| 2014 | My Secret Hotel | Jo Sung-gyeom | | |
| 2015 | A Girl Who Sees Smells | Kwon Jae-hee | | |
| 2015–2016 | Remember | Nam Gyu-man | | |
| 2016 | Beautiful Gong Shim | Ahn Dan-tae / Seok Joon-pyo | | |
| 2016 | The Doctors | Nam Ba-ram | Guest (Episodes 13–15) | |
| 2017 | Good Manager | Kim Sung-ryong | | |
| 2017 | Man to Man | | Cameo | |
| 2017 | Distorted | Han Moo-young | | |
| 2017 | KBS Drama Special – "You Are Closer Than I Think" | | Cameo | |
| 2018 | The Undateables | Kang Hoon-nam | | |
| 2019 | Doctor Prisoner | Na Yi-jae | | |
| 2019–2020 | Hot Stove League | Baek Seung-soo | | |
| 2020–2021 | Awaken | Do Jung-woo | | |
| 2021 | The Veil | Han Ji-hyuk | | |
| 2022 | One Dollar Lawyer | Chun Ji-hoon | | |
| 2023 | Taxi Driver 2 | Chun Ji-hoon | Cameo (episode 9) | |
| 2023 | My Dearest | Lee Jang-hyun | | |
| 2025 | Our Movie | Lee Je-ha | | |
| 2025 | Dynamite Kiss | Chun Ji-hoon | Cameo (episode 9), as his character from One Dollar Lawyer | |
| 2026 | The Husband | Kang Tae-ju | | |

=== Television shows ===
| Year | Title | Role | Notes | Ref. |
|---|---|---|---|---|
| 2004–2005 | Music Bank | Host | with So Yi-hyun | |
| 2014 | We Got Married Season 4 | Cast member | with Hong Jin-young | |
| 2016 | Saturday Night Live Korea | Host | Episode 142 | |
| 2016–2017 | Singing Battle | Host | (Pilot, Episode 1–21) | |
| 2020 | I-Land | Storyteller | | |

=== Hosting ===
| Year | Title | Notes | Ref. |
|---|---|---|---|
| 2017 | 2017 KBS Drama Awards | with Lee Yoo-ri, Park Soo-hong | |

=== Music video appearances ===
| Year | Song title | Artist |
|---|---|---|
| 2002 | "백설공주를 사랑한 난장이" | Cool |
| 2002 | "작년, 오늘" | Cool |
| 2006 | "The Thing That I Forget You" (너를 잊는 일) | Lee Jung Bong |
| 2014 | "Cheer Up" (산다는 건) | Hong Jin-young |
| 2016 | "Sketch" | Hyomin |

== Accolades ==
=== Awards and nominations ===
Name of the award ceremony, year presented, category, nominee of the award, and the result of the nomination
| Award ceremony | Year | Category | Nominee / Work | Result | Ref. |
|---|---|---|---|---|---|
| APAN Star Awards | 2016 | Excellence Award, Actor in a Miniseries | Remember: War of the Son | Won | |
| APAN Star Awards | 2021 | Top Excellent Actor in a Miniseries | Hot Stove League | Nominated | |
| APAN Star Awards | 2021 | Popular Star Award, Actor | Hot Stove League | Nominated | |
| APAN Star Awards | 2022 | Top Excellence Award, Actor in a Miniseries | The Veil | Nominated | |
| Asia Artist Awards | 2016 | Best Celebrity Award, Actor | Remember: War of the Son | Won | |
| Asia Artist Awards | 2017 | Best Artist Award, Actor | Good Manager | Won | |
| Baeksang Arts Awards | 2016 | Best Actor – Television | Remember: War of the Son | Nominated | |
| Baeksang Arts Awards | 2017 | Best Actor – Television | Good Manager | Nominated | |
| Baeksang Arts Awards | 2020 | Best Actor – Television | Hot Stove League | Nominated | |
| Baeksang Arts Awards | 2024 | Best Actor – Television | My Dearest | Won | |
| Grimae Awards | 2020 | Best Actor | Hot Stove League | Won | |
| Grimae Awards | 2023 | Best Actor | My Dearest | Won | |
| KBS Drama Awards | 2003 | Best Actor in a One-Act/Special Drama | To William | Won | |
| KBS Drama Awards | 2003 | Best New Actor | Pearl Necklace | Nominated | |
| KBS Drama Awards | 2005 | Popularity Award | My Rosy Life | Won | |
| KBS Drama Awards | 2012 | Best Actor in a One-Act/Special Drama | Still Picture | Nominated | |
| KBS Drama Awards | 2017 | Top Excellence Award, Actor | Good Manager | Won | |
| KBS Drama Awards | 2017 | Excellence Award, Actor in a Mid-length Drama | Good Manager | Nominated | |
| KBS Drama Awards | 2017 | Best Couple Award | Namkoong Min with Lee Jun-ho; Good Manager | Won | |
| KBS Drama Awards | 2019 | Top Excellence Award, Actor | Doctor Prisoner | Nominated | |
| KBS Drama Awards | 2019 | Excellence Award, Actor in a Miniseries | Doctor Prisoner | Nominated | |
| KBS Entertainment Awards | 2016 | Best Entertainer Award — Variety Show Category | Singing Battle | Won | |
| Kinolights Awards | 2022 | Actor of the Year (Domestic) | One Dollar Lawyer | 3rd | |
| KMTV Music Star Contest | 1999 | VJ Grand Prize | NamKoong Min | Won | |
| Korean Broadcasting Awards | 2017 | Best Actor | Good Manager | Won | |
| Korea Drama Awards | 2017 | Top Excellence Award, Actor | Good Manager | Nominated | |
| Korea PD Awards | 2021 | Best Actor | Hot Stove League | Won | |
| MBC Drama Awards | 2011 | Excellence Award, Actor in a Miniseries | Listen to My Heart | Nominated | |
| MBC Drama Awards | 2013 | Excellence Award, Actor in a Serial Drama | Hur Jun, the Original Story | Nominated | |
| MBC Drama Awards | 2021 | Grand Prize (Daesang) | The Veil | Won | |
| MBC Drama Awards | 2021 | Top Excellence Award, Actor in a Miniseries | The Veil | Nominated | |
| MBC Drama Awards | 2023 | Grand Prize (Daesang) | My Dearest | Won | |
| MBC Drama Awards | 2023 | Best Couple Award with Ahn Eun-jin | My Dearest | Won | |
| MBC Entertainment Awards | 2014 | New Star of the Year | We Got Married | Won | |
| SBS Drama Awards | 2015 | Special Award, Actor in a Miniseries | A Girl Who Sees Smells | Won | |
| SBS Drama Awards | 2016 | Top Excellence Award, Actor in a Romantic Comedy Drama | Beautiful Gong Shim | Won | |
| SBS Drama Awards | 2016 | Top 10 Stars | Remember: War of the Son, Beautiful Gong Shim | Won | |
| SBS Drama Awards | 2016 | Best Couple Awards | Namkoong Min with Bang Min-ah; Beautiful Gong Shim | Nominated | |
| SBS Drama Awards | 2017 | Top Excellence Award, Actor in a Monday–Tuesday Drama | Distorted | Won | |
| SBS Drama Awards | 2020 | Grand Prize (Daesang) | Hot Stove League | Won | |
| SBS Drama Awards | 2020 | Top Excellence Award, Actor in a Miniseries Action Drama | Hot Stove League | Nominated | |
| SBS Drama Awards | 2022 | Grand Prize (Daesang) | One Dollar Lawyer | Nominated | |
| SBS Drama Awards | 2022 | Top Excellence Award, Actor in a Miniseries Romance/Comedy Drama | One Dollar Lawyer | Nominated | |
| SBS Drama Awards | 2022 | Director's Award | One Dollar Lawyer | Won | |
| The Seoul Awards | 2017 | Best Actor | Good Manager | Nominated | |

=== State honors ===
Name of country, year given, and name of honor
| Country | Organization | Year | Honor or Award | Ref. |
|---|---|---|---|---|
| South Korea | Korean Popular Culture and Arts Awards (Note: Honors are given at the Korean Popular Culture and Arts Awards, arranged by the Korea Creative Content Agency and hosted by the Ministry of Culture, Sports and Tourism. They are awarded to those who have contributed to the arts and South Korea's pop culture.) | 2017 | Minister of Culture, Sports and Tourism Commendation | |
| South Korea | Korean Popular Culture and Arts Awards | 2023 | Prime Minister's Commendation | |

=== Listicles ===
Name of publisher, year listed, name of listicle, and placement
| Publisher | Year | Listicle | Placement | Ref. |
|---|---|---|---|---|
| Forbes | 2024 | Korea Power Celebrity 40 | 28th | |
| Gallup Korea | 2023 | Television Actor of the Year | 1st | |
| Gallup Korea | 2024 | Best Television Couple of the Past Decade (Note: With Ahn Eun-jin for My Dearest (2023)) | 9th | |
