= Longing for You (TV series) =

2023 South Korean television series

- Promotional poster
- Hangul: 오랫동안 당신을 기다렸습니다
- Lit.: I Have Waited a Long Time for You
- RR: Oraetdongan dangsineul gidaryeotseumnida
- MR: Oraettongan tangsinŭl kidaryŏssŭmnida
- Genre: Mystery; Thriller
- Written by: Kwon Min-soo
- Directed by: Han Chul-soo; Kim Yong-min
- Starring: Na In-woo; Kim Ji-eun; Kwon Yul; Bae Jong-ok; Lee Kyu-han; Jung Sang-hoon
- Music by: Kim Jang-woo; Park Hyun-kyung
- Country of origin: South Korea
- Original language: Korean
- No. of episodes: 14

Production
- Executive producer: Kim Min-seol (CP)
- Producers: Han Ah-reum; Yoon Chang-woo; Ahn Je-hyun; Shin Sang-yoon
- Running time: 60–70 minutes
- Production company: Samhwa Networks
- Budget: ₩14.6 billion

Original release
- Network: ENA
- Release: July 26 – September 7, 2023

Longing for You (Korean: 오랫동안 당신을 기다렸습니다) is a 2023 South Korean television series starring Na In-woo, Kim Ji-eun, Kwon Yul, Bae Jong-ok, Lee Kyu-han, and Jung Sang-hoon. It aired on ENA from July 26 to September 7, 2023, every Wednesday and Thursday at 21:00 (KST). It is also available for streaming on Viki in selected regions.

== Synopsis ==
The series follows the story of a detective in the countryside who strives to get revenge on behalf of his younger brother.

== Cast and characters ==
=== Main ===
- Na In-woo as Oh Jin-seong / Oh Jin-sang: a detective at Woojin Police Station who gets transferred to the special investigation team for a serial murder case.
- Kim Ji-eun as Go Young-joo: a prosecutor who traps criminals by any means and methods.
- Kwon Yul as Cha Young-woon: an elite prosecutor who is Young-joo's colleague at the Central District Prosecutors' Office.
- Bae Jong-ok as Yoo Jeong-suk: Young-woon's mother who is a hospital director and a thoracic surgeon.
- Lee Kyu-han as Park Ki-young: Young-woon's friend who is a reporter at the prosecutors' office.
- Jung Sang-hoon as Bae Min-gyu: a dentist who is the son of an influential member of the National Assembly.

=== Supporting ===
==== Jin-seong's family ====
- Ren as Oh Jin-woo: Jin-seong's younger brother.
- Jang Hye-jin as Hong Young-hee: Jin-seong and Jin-woo's mother.

==== Young-joo's family ====
- Kim Hee-jung as Pi Jang-mi: Young-joo's mother.

==== Jinjin Group ====
- Choi Kwang-il as Cha Jin-cheol: Young-woon's father who is the owner of Jinjin Group.
- Kim Cheol-ki as Jung Woo-no: a secretary at Jinjin Group.

==== Murder case special investigation team ====
- Jung Ga-hee as Yang Hee-joo: a junior prosecutor at the Central District Prosecutors' Office.
- Na In-kyu as Yook Jung-tae: a detective at Seocho Police Station.

==== Other ====
- Kim Hyung-mook as Dr. Chu Young-chun: an internal medicine doctor.
- Ahn Si-ha as Kim Mi-ro / Ma-ri

=== Extended ===
- Kim Young-hoon as Lee Sang-geun: chief prosecutor of the Central District Prosecutors' Office.
- Song Seung-ha as Lee Eun-byul: an actress.
- Kim Jong-gu as Bae Tae-wook: Min-gyu's father.
- Park Hyun-sook as Baek Mi-ja
- Choi Beom-ho as Attorney Yoon

=== Special appearance ===
- Kim Jin-woo as a profiler

== Production ==
Filming was scheduled to begin in the second half of 2022.

In March 2023, production company Samhwa Networks announced that it had signed a supply contract with KT Studio Genie for the production of the series worth 14.572 billion won.

== Viewership ==
Longing for You : South Korea viewers per episode (thousands)

Season	Episode number														Average
Season	1	2	3	4	5	6	7	8	9	10	11	12	13	14	Average
1	306	389	464	419	486	583	546	562	546	495	757	659	731	779	552

Source: Audience measurement performed nationwide by Nielsen Korea.

Average TV viewership ratings
Ep.	Original broadcast date	Average audience share (Nielsen Korea)	
Ep.	Original broadcast date	Nationwide	Seoul
1	July 26, 2023	1.405% (3rd)	1.350% (4th)
2	July 27, 2023	1.827% (3rd)	1.818% (3rd)
3	August 2, 2023	2.032% (3rd)	2.142% (3rd)
4	August 3, 2023	2.054% (3rd)	2.164% (3rd)
5	August 9, 2023	2.412% (3rd)	2.602% (3rd)
6	August 10, 2023	2.663% (2nd)	2.750% (3rd)
7	August 16, 2023	2.621% (3rd)	3.069% (3rd)
8	August 17, 2023	2.548% (1st)	2.471% (2nd)
9	August 23, 2023	2.778% (3rd)	2.903% (3rd)
10	August 24, 2023	2.550% (1st)	2.736% (1st)
11	August 30, 2023	3.597% (2nd)	3.587% (3rd)
12	August 31, 2023	2.978% (1st)	2.907% (1st)
13	September 6, 2023	3.598% (3rd)	3.581% (3rd)
14	September 7, 2023	4.114% (1st)	4.691% (1st)
Average		2.656%	2.769%
In the table above, the blue numbers represent the lowest ratings and the red numbers represent the highest ratings.; This series aired on a cable channel/pay TV which normally has a relatively smaller audience compared to free-to-air TV/public broadcasters (KBS, SBS, MBC and EBS).

== Awards and nominations ==
Name of the award ceremony, year presented, category, nominee of the award, and the result of the nomination
Award ceremony	Year	Category	Nominee	Result	Ref.
Korea Drama Awards	2023	Excellence Award, Actress	Kim Ji-eun	Won	
