= Lee Kyu-han =

South Korean actor (born 1980)

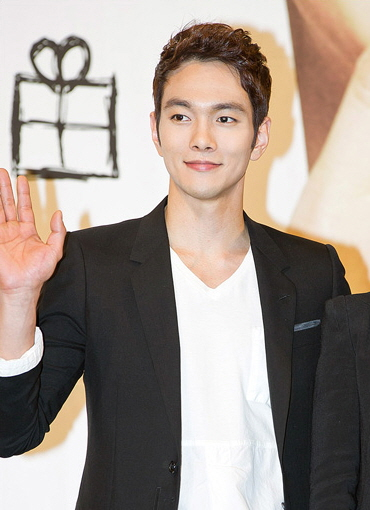
- Born: August 4, 1980 (age 46); Wando, Wando County, South Jeolla Province, South Korea
- Education: Kookmin University
- Occupation: Actor
- Years active: 1998–present
- Agent: Billions

Korean name
- Hangul: 이규한
- Hanja: 李奎翰
- RR: I Gyuhan
- MR: I Kyuhan

Lee Kyu-han (Korean: 이규한; born August 4, 1980) is a South Korean actor. He made his acting debut in 1998, but first drew viewers' attention in 2005 as the heroine's ex-boyfriend in romantic comedy My Lovely Sam Soon, later going on to more high-profile supporting roles in Que Sera, Sera (2007), Smile, You (2009), and More Charming by the Day (2010). Lee has since played leading roles in the television dramas The Wedding Scheme (2012), The Birth of a Family (2012), and Only Love (2014). Appearances on variety-reality shows such as the second season of Real Men in 2015 further boosted his popularity. And he was further known for his role as Baek Seok in a 2015–2016 drama series I Have a Lover.

== Filmography ==
=== Film ===
Year	Title	Role
2006	The Other Side of the Sun	Soo-hyeon
2007	Mapado 2: Back to the Island	Jeon Gi-young
2011	White: The Melody of the Curse	Choi Spoon
2013	Blood and Ties	Kim Jae-kyung
2018	Deja Vu	Seo Woo-Jin

=== Television series ===
Year	Title	Role
1998	Love and Success	Kim Myung-soo
1999	Youth	Soo-hyeon
1999	March	Kyu-han
1999	KAIST	Computer Science graduate student
2000	Some Like It Hot	Kang Cheol-ho
2005	My Lovely Sam Soon	Min Hyun-woo
2005	Love Needs a Miracle	Jin Jung-pyo
2007	Que Sera Sera	Shin Joon-hyuk
2009	Soul	Seo Joon-hee
2009	Smile, You	Lee Han-se
2010	More Charming by the Day	Lee Kyu-han
2010	KBS Drama Special: "Snail Dormitory"	Bang Joon-seong
2011	Listen to My Heart	Lee Seung-chul
2011	If Tomorrow Comes	Lee Il-bong
2012	The Wedding Scheme	Lee Kang-jae
2012	The Birth of a Family	Kang Yoon-jae
2014	Only Love	Choi Jae-min
2015	The Big Dipper	
2015	I Have a Lover	Baek Seok
2017	Introverted Boss	Reporter Woo
2018	The Rich Son	Nam Tae-il
2018	Drama Stage: "The Dramatization Has Already Begun"	
2019	The Crowned Clown	Joo Ho-geol
2019	Graceful Family	Mo Wan-Soo
2021	She Would Never Know	Lee Jae-woon
2022	Again My Life	Lawyer Cha (Cameo, episode 16)
2022	Becoming Witch	Jo Doo-chang; Cameo
2022	May I Help You?	Vincent
2023	Battle for Happiness	Kang Do-joon
2023	Longing for You	Park Ki-young
2024	The Judge from Hell	Jung Tae-gyu

=== Television show ===
Year	Title	Notes/Ref.
2009	Introduce the Star's Friend	
2011	Diet Survival BIGsTORY	Host
2013	Law of the Jungle in Savanna	Cast member
2015	Real Men	Cast member
2016	Battle Trip	Contestant with Kim Ki-bang, Episode 27-30
2017	Scene Stealer	Cast member
2017	Thinking About My Bias	Cast member
2019	Shall We Chicken?	Cast member
2019	Seoul Mate 3	Cast member
2021	Are You Hungry for Delivery? Just Order It!	Cast member
2023	Rossily in Secret Ulsan	The second version of the fortified version of Rossily in Secret Island.

=== Music video appearances ===
Year	Song title	Artist
2004	"Addiction"	Kim Jong-kook
2005	"Right Here"	Flower
2009	"Because I Couldn't Be Like a Man"	Someday

=== Hosting ===
Year	Title	Notes	Ref.
2023	28th Chunsa International Film Festival	with Song Ji-woo and comedian Lee Byung-jin	

== Awards and nominations ==
Name of the award ceremony, year presented, category, recipient of the award and the result of the nomination
Award ceremony	Year	Category	Recipient	Result	Ref.
MBC Drama Awards	2018	Excellence Award, Actor in a Serial Drama	The Rich Son	Won	
MBC Drama Awards	2022	Best Supporting Actor	May I Help You?	Nominated	
MBC Entertainment Awards	2010	Excellence Award, Actor in a Sitcom or Comedy	More Charming by the Day	Won	
SBS Drama Awards	2005	New Star Award	Love Needs a Miracle	Won	
