= Jung Sang-hoon =

South Korean actor

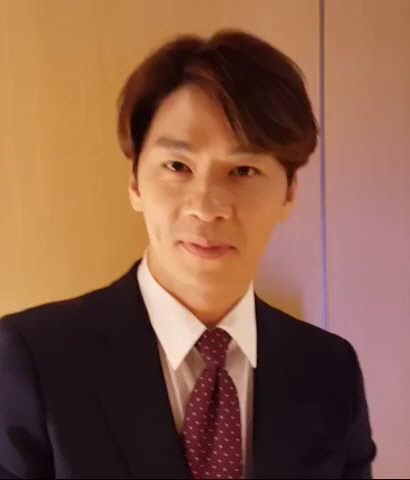
- Jung in 2018
- Born: September 9, 1976 (age 50); Seoul, South Korea
- Occupation: Actor
- Years active: 1998–present

Korean name
- Hangul: 정상훈
- Hanja: 鄭尙勳
- RR: Jeong Sanghun
- MR: Chŏng Sanghun

Jung Sang-hoon (born September 9, 1976) is a South Korean actor. He is known for being a cast member on the TV show Saturday Night Live Korea.

== Filmography ==
=== Film ===
Year	Title	Role	Notes
2001	Volcano High	Golbangi	
2003	Please Teach Me English	Young-joo's brother	
2004	Mokpo The Harbour		
2007	Evil Twin	Village Man Choi	
2011	Sunday Punch	In-sik	
2016	The Last Princess	Bok-dong	
2016	Roman Holiday	Doo-man	
2018	Heung-boo: The Revolutionist	Kim Sat-gat	
2018	Gate	Min-wook	
2022	Decibel	Oh Dae-oh	
2023	The Little Mermaid	Sebastian	Korean dubbed

=== Television series ===
Year	Title	Role	Notes/Ref.
2005	Green Rose	Kim Dong-wook	
2006	Hwang Jin-yi	Sang-soo	
2007	Blue Fish		
2015	Love on a Rooftop	Sung-nam	Cameo
2015	High-End Crush	Jong-hyeon	Korean-Chinese production web drama
2016	Lucky Romance	Han Ryang-ha	
2016	Don't Dare to Dream	Choi Dong-Gi	
2017	The Lady in Dignity	Ahn Jae-suk	
2018	My Contracted Husband, Mr. Oh	Eric Jo	
2018	The Miracle We Met	Drama PD	Cameo
2018	Big Forest	Jung Sang-hoon	
2019	Legal High	Yoo Sang-goo	
2019	Love Affairs in the Afternoon	Ji Chang Gook	
2020	Team Bulldog: Off-Duty Investigation	Lee Ban Seok	
2020	It's Okay to Not Be Okay	Motel Receptionist	Cameo
2020	Birthcare Center	Shaman	Cameo
2020	Cheat on Me If You Can	Son Jin-ho	
2022	Again My Life	Lee Min-soo	
2022	Becoming Witch	Lee Nak-goo	
2023	Longing for You	Bae Min-gyu	
2023	Twinkling Watermelon	Master	

=== Web series ===
Year	Title	Role	Ref.
TBA	People of the Blue House	Senior secretary	

=== Variety shows ===
Year	Title	Notes/Ref.
2013–present	Saturday Night Live Korea	Cast member
2015	Youth Over Flowers	Iceland segment
2015	King of Mask Singer	Contestant
2017	Island Trio	
2023	Green Father	Cast Member

== Theater ==
Year	English title	Korean title	Role	Ref.
2022	Come Back	돌아온다		
2022	The History Boys	히스토리 보이즈	Hector	

== Awards and nominations ==
Year	Award	Category	Nominated work	Result
2016	tvN10 Awards	Made in tvN, Actor in Variety	SNL Korea	Nominated
2016	tvN10 Awards	PD's Choice Award, Variety	SNL Korea	Won
2016	24th SBS Drama Awards	Special Award, Actor in a Romantic-Comedy Drama	Don't Dare to Dream	Nominated
2017	1st The Seoul Awards	Best Supporting Actor (Television)	The Lady in Dignity	Won
2018	54th Baeksang Arts Awards	Best Supporting Actor (Television)	The Lady in Dignity	Nominated
2018	11th Korea Drama Awards	Popular Character Award – Male	My Contracted Husband, Mr. Oh	Won
2018	MBC Drama Awards	Excellence Award, Actor in a Weekend Drama	My Contracted Husband, Mr. Oh	Won
