= Jung Moon-sung =

South Korean actor

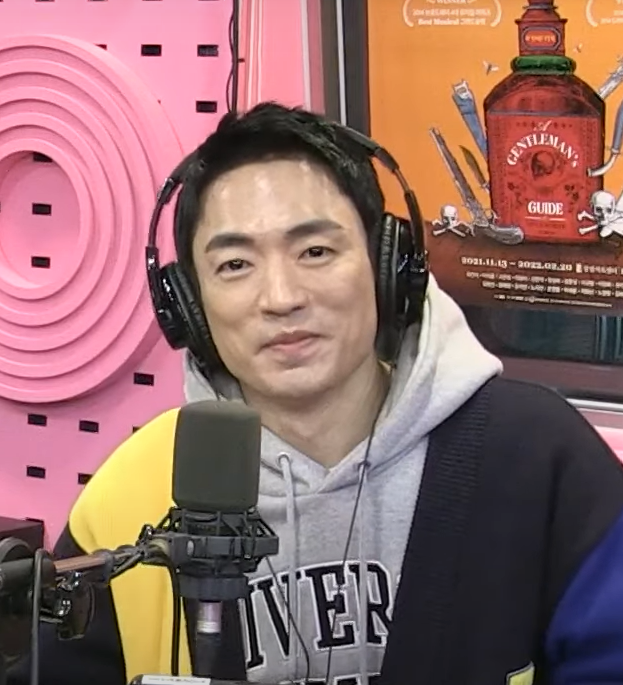
- Jung in Dec 2021
- Born: January 13, 1981 (age 45); South Korea
- Occupation: Actor
- Years active: 2007–present
- Agent: Blossom Entertainment
- Known for: Hospital Playlist; Miracle: Letters to the President; The Veil

Korean name
- Hangul: 정문성
- Hanja: 丁文晟
- RR: Jeong Munseong
- MR: Chŏng Munsŏng
- Website: Jung Moon-sung at Blossom Entertainment

Jung Moon-sung (Korean: 정문성; born January 13, 1981) is a South Korean actor. He has appeared in numerous television series, including Hospital Playlist (2020–2021), Miracle: Letters to the President (2021) and The Veil (2021). On stage, Jung has also participated in various productions, including the musical Maybe Happy Ending (2016).

== Career ==
Jung Moon-sung was born on January 13, 1981. Initially, he pursued music due to his passion for singing. However, he later enrolled in Soonchunhyang University where he studied theatre and film. It was during this time that he discovered his interest in acting. He took a year off from college to prepare for his debut as a singer, but he had to enlist in the military.

While serving in the military, Jung contemplated his career options and wondered if he could combine his love for singing and acting. He recalls thinking, "Is there a way for me to sing and act at the same time after my discharge from the military?" Fortunately, soon after his discharge, he had the opportunity to audition for the musical Subway Line 1. He passed the audition even before graduating from university. This musical marked the beginning of his career as a musical actor.

== Filmography ==
=== Film ===
Year	Title	Role	Notes	Ref.
2005	Gloomy Boy			
2011	The Unjust	iron brother-in-law friend 3		
2013	South Bound	Gong An (Public Security 2)	Support Role	
2021	The Cursed: Dead Man's Prey	Jeong Seong-jun	Main Role	
2021	Miracle: Letters to the President	Kim Yong-hwan	Support Role	
2022	Project Wolf Hunting	Kyu-tae	Support Role	

=== Television series ===
Year	Title	Role	Notes	Ref.
2011	The Musical	Musical performer	Cameo (Episode 9)	
2012	Phantom	Uhm Jae-hee		
2013	Your Lady	Kim Tae-seong		
2013	Heartless City	Oh Gi-chul		
2013	The Suspicious Housekeeper	Detective Lee Tae-shik		
2014	Secret Door	Byeon Jong-in		
2015	Six Flying Dragons	Han Goo-young		
2016	A Beautiful Mind	Hwang Jung-hwan		
2016–2017	The Legend of the Blue Sea	Heo Il-joong (young)		
2017	Good Manager	Han Dong-hoon		
2017–2018	Prison Playbook	Yoo Jeong-min	cameo	
2018	About Time	Yoon Do-San		
2018	Life	Jo Nam-Hyeong		
2018	The Undateables	Yook Ryong		
2018	Big Forest	Department Head Daniel Jegal		
2018	The Hymn of Death	Jo Myung Hee		
2019	Haechi	Lee Tan		
2020	The Cursed	Jung Sung-Joon		
2020	Birthcare Center	Doctor	Cameo (episode 1)	
2020–2021	Hospital Playlist	Do Jae-hak	Season 1–2	
2021	The Veil	Chang Chun-Woo		
2021	Moebius: The Veil	Chang Chun-Woo		
2022	The Good Detective	Woo Tae-ho	Season 2	
2022	One Dollar Lawyer	Shin Joong-hoon	Cameo (episode 12)	
2023	Divorce Attorney Shin	Jo Jeong-sik		
2024	The Auditors	Hwang Se-woong		
2025	Resident Playbook	Do Jae-hak	Special appearance (Ep. 4, 11)	
2026	The Scarecrow	Lee Ki-hwan		

=== Web series ===
Year	Title	Role	Notes	Ref.
2022	Stock Struck	Kang San		
2023	The Glory	prisoner	Cameo (Part 2, Episode 8)	

== Stage ==
=== Musical ===
Musical play performance
Year	Title		Role	Theater	Date	Ref.
Year	English	Korean	Role	Theater	Date	Ref.
2006	Charlie Brown	찰리 브라운	shrouder			
2007	Subway Line 1	지하철 1호선	Glasses; washboard; riot squad; male college students; drunken people	Hakjeon Blue Theater Small Theater	May 3 - October 28	
2007	Oh! While You are Sleeping	오! 당신이 잠든 사이	Peter	Musical Shout Theater	July 25 - October 26, 2008	
2008	Laundry	빨래	Nashim	The Eggs and Nuclear Small Theater	August 29 - December 31	
2009	Gochujang Tteokbokki	고추장 떡볶이	White tiger	Hakjeon Blue Theater Small Theater	January 9 - March 1	
2009	Laundry	빨래	Nashim	Doosan Art Center Yeongang Hall	April 28 - June 14	
2009	Laundry	빨래	Solongo	Hakjeon Blue Theater Small Theater	July 24 - June 27, 2010	
2010	Finding Kim Jong-wook	김종욱 찾기	Multi man	JTN Art Hall 1		
2011	Laundry	빨래	Solongo	Hakjeon Blue Theater Small Theater	March 3 - September 4	
2011	Laundry	빨래	Solongo	Daegu Cultural Arts Theater CT	April 12 - June 19	
2011	Laundry	빨래	Solongo	Suwon Gyeonggi Arts Center Small Theater	July 9 - July 10	
2011	Prince Puzzle	왕세자 실종사건	Ha Nae-gwan	Gyeonghuigung Palace Sungjeongjeon	September 1 - September 21	
2012	Laundry	빨래	Solongo	Hakjeon Blue Theater Small Theater	September 7 - March 30, 2012	
2012	Laundry	빨래	Solongo	Hakjeon Blue Theater Small Theater	October 12 - November 11	
2013	Triangle	트라이앵글	Doyeon	Sangmyung Art Hall 1	Aug 31–Nov 10	
2013–2014	Laundry	빨래	Solongo	Art One Theater 2	October 11, 2013 to March 2, 2014	
2014	Hymn of Death	사의 찬미	Kim Woo-jin	Yes24 Stage 1		
2014	Goddess is watching	여신님이 보고 계셔	Han Young-beom	Doosan Art Center Yonkang Hall		
2014	Hi! UFO	안녕! 유에프오	Park Sanghyun	CJ Azit		
2015	Hymn of Death	사의 찬미	Kim Woo-jin	Yes24 Stage 1	June 6 to September 6	
2016	Hedwig: New Makeup	헤드윅: 뉴 메이크업	Hedwig	Hongik University Daehangno Arts Center Grand Theater	March 1 to May 29	
2016	Hedwig: New Makeup	헤드윅: 뉴 메이크업	Hedwig	Suwon Gyeonggi Arts Center Grand Theater		
2016	Finding Kim Jong-wook	김종욱 찾기	Youngsook, grandfather	Petitzel Theater		
2016–2017	Gutenberg	구텐베르크	Doug	Yes 24 Stage 3	September 17 to December 7	
2016–2017	Maybe Happy Ending	어쩌면 해피엔딩	Oliver	Yes 24 Stage 2	December 20 to March 5	
2017	Gutenberg	구텐베르크	Doug	Hoengseong Culture and Arts Center		
2017	Hymn of Death	사의 찬미	Kim Woo-jin	Yes 24 Stage 1	July 28 to August 27	
2017	Hedwig	헤드윅	Hedwig	Hongik University Daehangno Arts Center Grand Theater	August 18 to November 5	
2017	Gutenberg	구텐베르크	Doug	Swan Hall, Andong Culture and Arts Center		
2017	Gutenberg	구텐베르크	Doug	Jeonju Sori Culture Center Yeonji Hall		
2017	Maybe Happy Ending	어쩌면 해피엔딩	Oliver	Yes 24 Stage 1	Nov 13–Feb 10	
2017	Gutenberg	구텐베르크	Doug	Guri Art Hall Cosmos Grand Theater		
2018	Hedwig	헤드윅	Hedwig	Seongnam Arts Center Opera House	January 6 – 7, 2018	
2018	Hedwig	헤드윅	Hedwig	Daegu Opera House	January 13 – 14, 2018	
2018	Hedwig	헤드윅	Hedwig	Daejeon Arts Center Art Hall	January 27 – 28, 2018	
2018	Hedwig	헤드윅	Hedwig	National Taipei University Sports Center		
2018	Subway Line 1	지하철 1호선	Glasses; washboard; riot squad; male college students; drunken people	Hakjeon Blue Theater Small Theater	May 3 - October 28	
2019	Hymn of Death	사의 찬미	Kim Woo-jin	Yes24 Stage 1		
2019	Hedwig	헤드윅	Hedwig	Hongik University Daehakro Art Center Grand Theater	August 16 – November 3, 2019	
2019	Hedwig	헤드윅	Hedwig	Daegu Keimyung Art Center		
2019	Hedwig	헤드윅	Hedwig	Icheon Art Hall Grand Theater	November 22 – November 23, 2019	
2019	Hedwig	헤드윅	Hedwig	Busan Centum City Sohyang Theater Shinhan Card Hall	December 21 – December 29, 2019	
2020	Hedwig	헤드윅	Hedwig	Uijeongbu Arts Center Grand Theater	January 19	
2020	Maybe Happy Ending	어쩌면 해피엔딩	Oliver	Yes 24 Stage 1	June 30 - September 13	
2021–2022	A Gentleman's Guide to Love and Murder	젠틀맨스 가이드: 사랑과 살인편	D'Ysquith	Kwanglim Art Center BBCH Hall	November 13 - February 20, 2022	
2022	A Gentleman's Guide to Love and Murder	젠틀맨스 가이드: 사랑과 살인편	D'Ysquith	Icheon Art Hall Grand Hall	February 27	
2022	A Gentleman's Guide to Love and Murder	젠틀맨스 가이드: 사랑과 살인편	D'Ysquith	Busan Dream Theater	March 18 - March 20	
2022	Hymn of Death	사의 찬미	Kim Woo-jin	Daehangno TOM 1	July 27 - October 9	

=== Theater ===
Theater play performances
Year	Title		Role	Venue	Date	Ref.
Year	English	Korean	Role	Venue	Date	Ref.
2012	Model Students	모범생들	Kim Myung-jun	Art One Theater 3	February 3 - July 22	
2012–2013	Bad Magnet	나쁜자석	Fraser	Art One Theater 1	November 7 - January 27, 2013	
2013	True West	트루웨스트	Austin	Daehangno SM Theatee	Feb 21 to May 5	
2013	Bad Magnet	나쁜자석	Fraser	Art One Theater 1	December 6 - March 2, 2014	
2015	My Pounding Life	두근두근 내 인생	Han A-reum	Uniplex 2	March 13 - May 25	
2015	Speaking in Tongues	스피킹 인 텅스	Pete, Neil, John	Yes 24 Stage 3	May 1–July 19	
2016	True West Returns	트루웨스트 리턴즈	Lee	Yegreen Theater	June 24 to August 28, 2016	
2016	Hello Summer	안녕, 여름	Tae-min	Uniplex 2	September 6 - October 30	
2017	Sleuth	슬루스	Milo Tyndall	Yes24 Stage 2	June 2 - July 23	
2017–2018	Kiss of the Spider Woman	거미여인의 키스	Valentin	Art One Theater 2	December 5, 2017, to February 25, 2018	
2023	Shakespeare in Love	셰익스피어 인 러브	William Shakespeare	Seoul Arts Center CJ Towol Theater	January 28 - March 26	

== Discography ==
=== Cast recording ===
Year	Song title	Album	Notes
2017	"Fireflies and Jeju Island" (반딧불, 그리고 제주도)	Maybe Happy Ending cast recording	with Jeon Mi-do
2017	"You Can Just Remember That" (그것만은 기억해도 돼)	Maybe Happy Ending cast recording	with Jeon Mi-do
2017	"Thank You For Knocking on My Door" (내 문을 두드려줘서 고마웠어")	Maybe Happy Ending cast recording	with Jeon Mi-do

== Awards and nominations ==
Award ceremony	Year	Category	Nominee / Work	Result	Ref.
MBC Drama Awards	2021	Excellence Award, Actor in a Short Drama	Moebius: The Veil	Won	
SBS Drama Awards	2019	Best Character Award - Actor	Haechi	Won	
Blue Dragon Series Awards	2026	Best Supporting Actor	The Scarecrow	Nominated	
