= The Veil (South Korean TV series) =

- Promotional poster
- Hangul: 검은 태양
- Hanja: 검은 太陽
- Lit.: Black Sun
- RR: Geomeun taeyang
- MR: Kŏmŭn t'aeyang
- Genre: Spy; Action; Thriller
- Created by: Hong Seok-woo (MBC)
- Written by: Park Seok-ho
- Directed by: Kim Sung-yong
- Creative director: Kim Ji-ha
- Starring: Namkoong Min; Park Ha-sun; Kim Ji-eun
- Composer: Kim Jang-woo
- Country of origin: South Korea
- Original language: Korean
- No. of episodes: 12

Production
- Executive producers: Kim Myung (CP); Yoo Hong-ku; Kelly SH; Song Eun-do
- Producer: Kim Je-bok (MBC)
- Running time: 60 minutes
- Production companies: MBC; 3Mana Creative; Ateod Co. Ltd.
- Budget: ₩15 billion (US$13.7 million)

Original release
- Network: MBC TV
- Release: September 17 – October 23, 2021

The Veil (Korean: 검은 태양) is a 2021 South Korean television series starring Namkoong Min, Park Ha-sun, and Kim Ji-eun. Its screenplay, written by Park Seok-ho, won the 2018 MBC Drama Screenplay Contest. It aired on MBC TV from September 17 to October 23, 2021, every Friday and Saturday at 22:00 (KST).

A two-part spin-off of the series titled Moebius: The Veil, which was focused on the backstories of Park Ha-sun, Jung Moon-sung and Jang Young-nam's characters, aired on October 29–30, 2021.

== Synopsis ==
It is about a top field agent in the National Intelligence Service (NIS). After going missing a year ago, he returns to the organization to find an internal traitor who dropped him into the abyss.

== Cast ==
=== Main ===
- Namkoong Min as Han Ji-hyuk, the best field agent in the NIS who is admired by his colleagues for his shrewd and perfect performance.
- Park Ha-sun as Seo Soo-yeon, Ji-hyuk's co-worker at the NIS and the head of Criminal Information Integration Center.
- Kim Ji-eun as Yoo Je-yi, Ji-hyuk's partner who graduated early from KAIST, and is a promising field agent.

=== Supporting ===
==== Foreign Intelligence Bureau ====
- Jang Young-nam as Do Jin-sook
- Kim Jong-tae as Kang Pil-ho

==== Criminal Information Integration Center ====
- Kim Do-hyun as Ha Dong-gyun
- Park Jin-woo as Cha Min-chul
- Kwon So-hyun as Goo Hyo-eun

==== Domestic Intelligence Bureau ====
- Lee Geung-young as Lee In-hwan
- Kim Min-sang as Jung Yong-tae

==== Others ====
- Kim Byung-ki as Bang Young-chan
- Yu Oh-seong as Baek Mo-sa
- Woo Ji-hyun as Wie Goo-pyung
- Hyun Bong-sik as Cheon Myung-gi
- Jung Ji-yoon as Kim Yeo-jin
- Hwang Hee as Oh Kyung-seok
- Jo Bok-rae as Kim Dong-wook
- Ok Ja-yeon as Lin Wei

=== Extended ===
- Jung Moon-sung as Jang Chun-woo
- Kim Eun-woo as Pyo Jae-gyu
- Joo Jong-hyuk as Chang-gyu
- Ahn Ji-ho as Choi Sang-gyun

=== Special appearance ===
- Park Ji-yeon as Jung Eun-hee

== Production ==
The series received a 15 billion won investment from MBC and Wavve for its production. It is labelled as "MBC's 60th anniversary special project".

It was reported that filming started in April 2021 and continued filming for six months until October 21.

== Viewership ==
The Veil : South Korea viewers per episode (millions)

Season	Episode number											
Season	1	2	3	4	5	6	7	8	9	10	11	12
1	1.239	1.579	1.814	1.562	1.753	1.594	1.534	1.350	1.468	1.440	1.297	1.590

Source: Audience measurement performed nationwide by Nielsen Korea.

Ep.	Original broadcast date	Average audience share		
Ep.	Original broadcast date	Nielsen Korea		TNmS
Ep.	Original broadcast date	Nationwide	Seoul	Nationwide
1	September 17, 2021	7.2% (9th)	8.2% (6th)	5.4% (14th)
2	September 18, 2021	8.0% (4th)	8.5% (4th)	7.9% (2nd)
3	September 24, 2021	9.8% (5th)	10.1% (5th)	8.4% (6th)
4	September 25, 2021	8.3% (4th)	8.6% (3rd)	7.5% (4th)
5	October 1, 2021	9.4% (5th)	9.8% (5th)	8.6% (6th)
6	October 2, 2021	8.6% (4th)	9.2% (3rd)	8.3%
7	October 8, 2021	8.4% (6th)	8.7% (5th)	7.1%
8	October 9, 2021	7.8% (4th)	8.6% (3rd)	7.6%
9	October 15, 2021	8.3% (6th)	8.4% (4th)	6.3%
10	October 16, 2021	7.6% (5th)	7.7% (4th)	6.7%
11	October 22, 2021	7.4% (7th)	7.5% (8th)	6.7%
12	October 23, 2021	8.8% (3rd)	9.2% (3rd)	7.6% (3rd)
Average		8.30%	8.71%	7.34%
Special	September 18, 2021	4.3% (17th)	4.2% (18th)	4.6% (15th)
In the table above, the blue numbers represent the lowest ratings and the red numbers represent the highest ratings.

== Awards and nominations ==
Name of the award ceremony, year presented, category, nominee of the award, and the result of the nomination
Award ceremony	Year	Category	Nominee	Result	Ref.
APAN Star Awards	2022	Top Excellence Award, Actor in a Miniseries	Namkoong Min	Nominated	
MBC Drama Awards	2021	Grand Prize (Daesang)	Namkoong Min	Won	
MBC Drama Awards	2021	Top Excellence Award, Actor in a Miniseries	Namkoong Min	Nominated	
MBC Drama Awards	2021	Top Excellence Award, Actress in a Miniseries	Park Ha-sun	Nominated	
MBC Drama Awards	2021	Excellence Award, Actor in a Miniseries	Kim Jong-tae	Nominated	
MBC Drama Awards	2021	Excellence Award, Actress in a Miniseries	Jang Young-nam	Won	
MBC Drama Awards	2021	Best Supporting Actor	Kim Do-hyun	Nominated	
MBC Drama Awards	2021	Best Supporting Actress	Kwon So-hyun	Nominated	
MBC Drama Awards	2021	Best New Actress	Kim Ji-eun	Won	
