= 2021 MBC Drama Awards =

40th edition of award ceremony

- Official logo
- Date: December 30, 2021
- Site: MBC Media Center Public Hall, Sangam-dong, Mapo-gu, Seoul
- Hosted by: Kim Sung-joo
- Official website: 2021 MBC Drama Awards

Highlights
- Best Drama Serial: The Red Sleeve
- Grand Prize (Daesang): Namkoong Min - The Veil

Television coverage
- Network: MBC
- Viewership: Ratings: 7%; Viewership: 1.33 million people

The 2021 MBC Drama Awards, presented by Munhwa Broadcasting Corporation (MBC). Kim Sung-joo hosted the award ceremony second year in succession. It was aired on December 30, 2021, at 21:00 (KST). Namgoong Min won the Grand Prize for The Veil.

== Winners and nominees ==
Winners denoted in bold

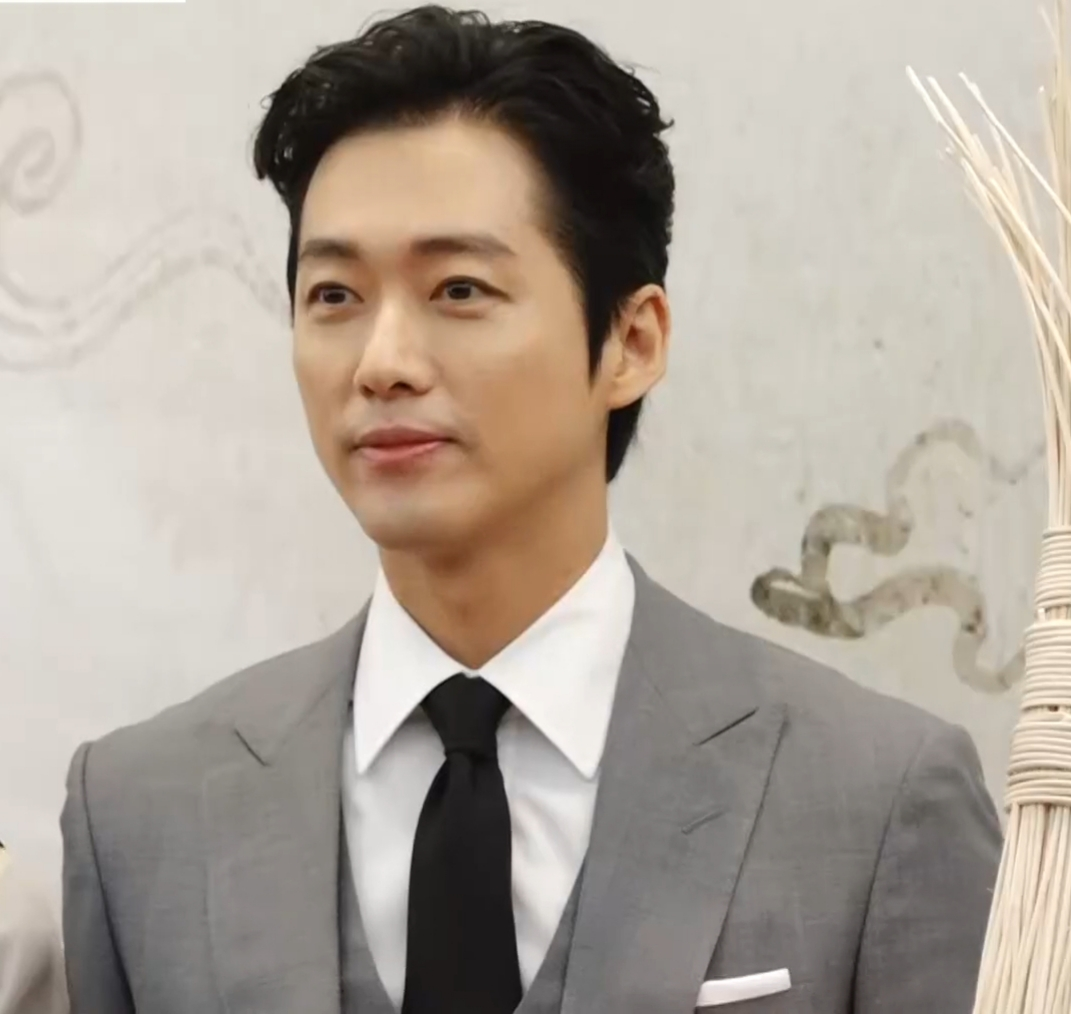
Namkoong Min, winner of Grand Prize (Daesang).

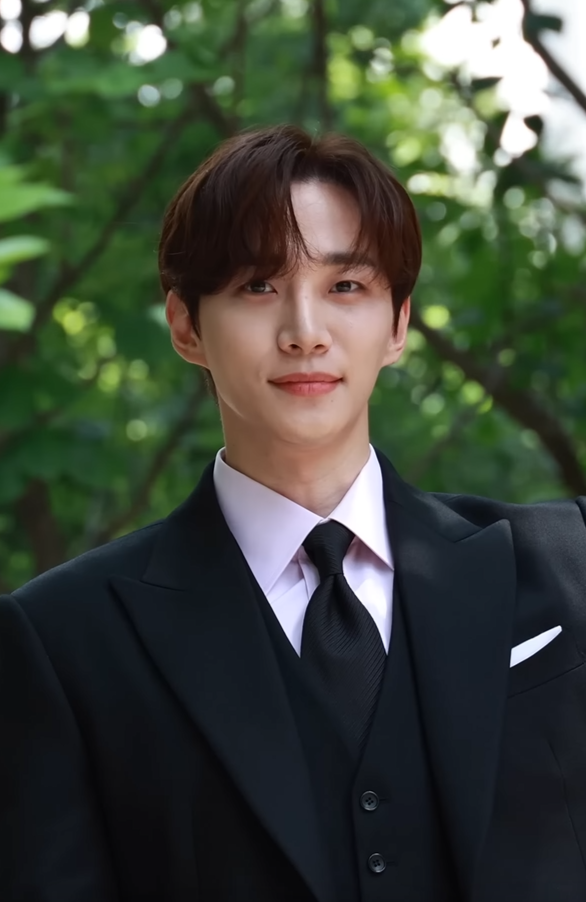
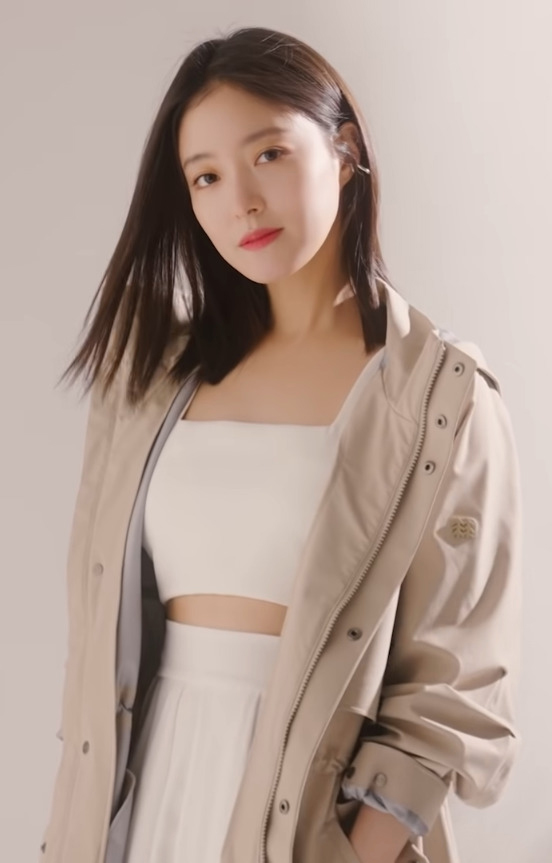
Lee Jun-ho (left), and Lee Se-young (right), winners of Top Excellence Award, Actor and Actresses in a Miniseries.

| Grand Prize (Daesang) | Drama of the Year |
|---|---|
| **Namgoong Min - The Veil** | **The Red Sleeve** |
| Top Excellence Award, Actor in a Miniseries | Top Excellence Award, Actress in a Miniseries |
| **Lee Jun-ho - The Red Sleeve**; Jung Jae-young - On the Verge of Insanity; Lee Deok-hwa - The Red Sleeve; Namgoong Min - The Veil | **Lee Se-young - The Red Sleeve**; Moon So-ri - On the Verge of Insanity; Nana - Oh My Ladylord; Park Ha-sun - The Veil |
| Top Excellence Award, Actor in a Daily Drama | Top Excellence Award, Actress in a Daily Drama |
| **Cha Seo-won - The Second Husband**; Jae Hee and Kwon Hyuk - A Good Supper | **Uhm Hyun-kyung - The Second Husband**; Jung Woo-yeon - A Good Supper |
| Excellence Award, Actor in a Miniseries | Excellence Award, Actress in a Miniseries |
| **Lee Sang-yeob - On the Verge of Insanity**; Kang Hoon - The Red Sleeve; Kang Min-hyuk - Oh My Ladylord; Kim Jong-tae - The Veil | **Jang Young-nam - The Veil**; Kim Ga-eun - On the Verge of Insanity; Kim Ho-jung - Oh My Ladylord; Park Ji-young - The Red Sleeve |
| Excellence Award, Actor in a Short Drama | Excellence Award, Actress in a Short Drama |
| **Jung Moon-sung - Moebius: The Veil**; Ahn Woo-yeon and Kwon Hwa-woon - Check Out the Event; Kim Do-hoon - Here's My Plan | **Kim Hwan-hee - Here's My Plan**; Bang Min-ah - Check Out the Event; Kim Bo-ra and Park Jin-hee - Love Scene Number |
| Best Supporting Actor | Best Supporting Actress |
| **Kim Do-hyun – The Veil**; Kim Nam-hee – On the Verge of Insanity; Song Yoo-taek – Oh My Ladylord; Oh Dae-hwan – The Red Sleeve | **Jang Hye-jin – The Red Sleeve**; Cha Chung-hwa – On the Verge of Insanity; Kwon So-hyun – The Veil; Lee Hwi-hyang – Oh My Ladylord |
| Best Couple Award | Best Writer Award |
| **Lee Jun-ho & Lee Se-young – The Red Sleeve**; Park Ha-sun & Jung Moon-sung – Moebius: The Veil; Lee Min-ki & Nana – Oh My Ladylord; Jung Jae-young & Moon So-ri – On the Verge of Insanity | **Jung Hae-ri - The Red Sleeve** |
| Best New Actor | Best New Actress |
| **Kang Hoon - The Red Sleeve**; Kim Do-hoon - Here's My Plan; Jang Eui-soo – Oh My Ladylord; Im Hyun-soo – On the Verge of Insanity | **Kim Ji-eun - The Veil**; Ahn Sol-bin – Oh My Ladylord; Ha Yu-ri - The Red Sleeve; Cheon Hee-joo – On the Verge of Insanity |
Lifetime Achievement Award
**Lee Deok-hwa - The Red Sleeve**

== Presenters ==
| Order | Presenter | Award | Ref. |
|---|---|---|---|
| 1 | Ahn Bo-hyun and Kim Hye-jun | Rookie of the Year Award | |
| 2 | Lee Jun-ho | Achievement Award | |

== Performances ==
| Order | Artist | Act performed | Ref. |
|---|---|---|---|
| 1 | Dance team Lachica | | |

== See also ==
- 2021 KBS Drama Awards
- 2021 SBS Drama Awards
- 7th APAN Star Awards
