= Blossom (Laboum EP) =

EP by Laboum
- Released: November 3, 2021
- Genre: K-pop
- Length: 17:13
- Language: Korean
- Label: Interpark Music Plus

Laboum chronology
Two of Us (2019)	Blossom (2021)

Singles from Blossom
- 1. "Kiss Kiss" Released: November 3, 2021

Blossom is the third extended play (EP) by South Korean girl group Laboum. It was released on November 3, 2021, by Interpark Music Plus. The EP marks the group's first release as a four-member group, after Yujeong's departure in September 2021, and their first release under their new label and their first Korean EP in nearly four years, following the release of Miss This Kiss (2017). The EP consists of four tracks, including the lead track "Kiss Kiss".

== Background ==
On September 8, Yujeong posted a handwritten letter on Instagram, announcing that she was going to leave the group after her contract expired. She also announced that Soyeon, ZN, Solbin and Haein have renewed their contracts, and that Laboum would continue as a quartet. In addition, it was announced that the remaining members has departed from their current agency and signed with Interpark Music Plus, a subsidiary of Interpark. On October 6, it was announced that Laboum would be making their comeback as a four-member group in early November. ZN will be using the name Jinyea for future activities moving forward. It was later announced that Laboum will be releasing their third EP Blossom on November 3. On October 19, Interpark Music Plus released Soyeon's solo promotional poster. The following day, Jinyea's solo promotion poster was released. On October 21, Haein's solo promotional poster was released. The following day, Solbin's solo promotional poster was released. On October 23, The group's promotional poster was released. The following day, Interpark Music Plus unveiled the track listing to the EP on their official social media accounts, revealing "Kiss Kiss" as the title track.

== Release ==
The EP was released on November 3 through many Korean online music services, including Melon. For the global market, the album was made available on iTunes. It was also released in physical format.

== Music video ==
On October 26, a first teaser for the music video of "Kiss Kiss" was released. On October 31, a second teaser for the music video of "Kiss Kiss" was released. On November 3, the official music video of "Kiss Kiss" was released.

== Track listing ==
Credits adapted from track listing and Melon.

Blossom track listing
No.	Title	Lyrics	Music	Arrangement	Length
1.	"Kiss Kiss"	Soyeon; Maxx Song; Red Hair Anne; ChaPpiPpi	Maxx Song; dr.ahn; Secret Weapon & Park Man-soon	SWIN LEE	3:09
2.	"How I Wish" (얼마나 좋을까)	Soyeon	Soyeon; Jung Sung-min (Psycho Tension)	Psycho Tension (Jung Sung-min, Mollo, DOO)	3:48
3.	"Repeat" (똑같잖아)	Solbin; AVIN; SLAY	Solbin; SWIN LEE; AVIN; SLAY	AVIN; SLAY; CHASE	3:25
4.	"Love on You"	Soyeon; Maxx Song	Soyeon; Maxx Song; Kim Young-shin	Kim Young-shin	3:40
5.	"Kiss Kiss" (Instrumental)		Maxx Song; dr.ahn; Secret Weapon & Park Man-soon	SWIN LEE	3:09
Total length:					17:13

== Charts ==
Chart performance for Blossom
Chart (2021)	Peak position
South Korean Albums (Gaon)	18

== Release history ==
Release history and formats for Blossom
Region	Date	Format	Label
Various	November 3, 2021	Digital download	Interpark Music Plus
South Korea	November 3, 2021	CD, music download	Interpark Music Plus
