= Miss This Kiss =

- Digital cover

EP by Laboum
- Released: April 17, 2017
- Recorded: 2017
- Studios: NH Studio; Iconic Studio
- Genres: K-pop; pop; dance-pop; big band
- Length: 17:20
- Language: Korean
- Labels: Global H; Interpark

Laboum chronology
Love Sign (2016)	Miss This Kiss (2017)	Between Us (2018)

Singles from Miss This Kiss
- 1. "Hwi Hwi" Released: April 17, 2017

Miss This Kiss (stylized in all caps) is the second extended play by South Korean girl group Laboum. It was released on April 17, 2017, by Global H Media and distributed by Interpark. After a successful crowdfunding campaign, the EP debuted at number one on the Gaon Album Chart. The lead single "Hwi Hwi" also earned the group their first ever music show trophy since their debut on April 28, 2017, on Music Bank.

It consists of six tracks, comprising genres including dance-pop and big band. The track "Be the Light" was co-written by the group member Yujeong. It received positive reviews from critics, many of whom praising the EP for its fun and fresh concept.

== Background and release ==
On March 15, 2017, Laboum's agency confirmed that the group was preparing to release an album in April. A crowdfunding campaign for the extended play was launched via Makestar on March 23. The campaign was considered successful, having reached its initial goal five minutes after its release, as well as exceeding its initial goal by 700% in the span of four days. The previous year, Laboum launched a Makestar campaign for their single album Fresh Adventure, which was also a success, reaching its initial goal in four hours. Promotional photos for Miss This Kiss were released from April 10 to April 12, which were described as reminiscent of Girls' Generation. Laboum released a video teaser on April 13, followed by the EP's track listing and a highlight medley on April 14. Miss This Kiss was officially released on April 17, 2017.

== Promotion ==
On the day of the EP's release, Laboum held a showcase for Miss This Kiss at Ilji Art Hall in Seoul. After performing tracks from the EP, the members split into units: Haein, Yulhee, and ZN (the "dance" unit) performed "Sorry" by Ciara, followed by Solbin, Soyeon, and Yujeong (the "vocals" unit) performing "One Call Away" by Charlie Puth. Later in the concert, Laboum sent a message of gratitude to a fan who had promoted the EP by wearing a tiger mask in the street.

A day after the EP's release, the group had their comeback stage on The Show. They continued promoting "Hwi Hwi" on other music shows in the following weeks. The album track "Be the Light" also received promotion on music shows. Laboum continued to promote the EP at music festivals and other events in the Seoul metropolitan area. On April 20, they performed the EP's tracks at a concert for Hello Mr. K, a concert series aimed towards foreigners living in South Korea.

== Composition ==
Yujeong (pictured) and Swin Lee wrote "Be the Light".

Miss This Kiss comprises six tracks. The EP's lead single "Hwi Hwi" is an upbeat dance-pop song that prominently features the sound of a whistle. Lyrically, it focuses on a kiss with a lover. In the EP's liner notes, the original title of the track is listed as "Wicked". The song's music video features the members performing choreography in colourful outfits. The following track, "Story Travel", is inspired by big band music; its lyrics describe the members embarking on a journey as if they were literary or film protagonists. "Be the Light" was partially written and composed by the group member Yujeong, and conveys the desire for someone to always be a bright light in her life. On SBS Radio's Cultwo Show, Yujeong stated that the song was dedicated to the fans of Laboum, also revealing that the group members helped create the song's choreography. "Difference Between Heaven and Earth" portrays a boyfriend who was once sweet but ends up changing, with the group member ZN credited for rap production. The final track of the EP is the instrumental version of "Hwi Hwi".

== Reception ==
Miss This Kiss was a commercial success, debuting atop the weekly South Korean Gaon Album Chart. On the monthly edition of the same chart, it debuted and peaked at number eight. The EP's lead single "Hwi Hwi" earned the group their first music show trophy on the April 28 episode of Music Bank. The commercial success of the EP drew suspicion from listeners, as it sold approximately thirty times as many copies as Laboum's previous release. The music show trophy that "Hwi Hwi" received was also called into question, as the album sales component of the runner-up IU's score was shown as zero. Laboum's agency clarified that the heightened sales were due to an endorsement deal, and it was later revealed that IU's album score of zero was because the sales-tracking period ended before her album's release. Additionally, the agency threatened to take legal action against those spreading rumours about the group.

Miss This Kiss received generally positive reviews. Funcurve writer Jazmine gave a positive review of the EP, calling it a "funky pool of fun for listeners". She reviewed most of the EP's tracks positively, though she refers to "Be the Light" as a "safe track that doesn't stand out too much" and criticized "Difference Between Heaven and Earth" for its lack of cohesion. Choi Sang-uk, writing for RNX News, praised the EP for its presentation of Laboum's fresh and lively image, further commending "Hwi Hwi" for its "highly addictive" choreography.

== Track listing ==
Miss This Kiss track listing
No.	Title	Lyrics	Music	Arrangement	Length
1.	"Intro"		Kamen Rider	Kamen Rider	1:11
2.	"Hwi Hwi"	Kamen Rider	Kamen Rider, Andreas Ohrn, Chris Wahle	Andreas Ohrn, Chris Wahle	3:14
3.	"Story Travel"	Mafly1, Moon Seol-ri	Damon Sharpe, Traci Hale, Sidnie Tipton	Damon Sharpe	2:59
4.	"Be the Light" (빛이 되어줘)	Yujeong, Swin Lee	Swin Lee, Yujeong	Swin Lee	3:28
5.	"Difference Between Heaven and Earth" (천지차이)	Hathor	D+I	D+I	2:56
6.	"Hwi hwi" (instrumental)		Kamen Rider, Andreas Ohrn, Chris Wahle	Andreas Ohrn, Chris Wahle	3:15
Total length:					17:20

== Personnel ==
- Laboum – vocals
  - Yujeong – composition, lyrics
  - ZN – rap production
- Kamen Rider – arrangement, composition, lyrics
- UncleJoe – mixing
- Jeon Bu-yeon – mixing assistance
- Kwon Nam-u – mastering
- Andreas Ohm – arrangement, composition
- Chris Wahle – arrangement, composition
- Choi-hun – bass guitar
- Yeong – guitar
- Kim So-ri – chorus harmonies
- Kim Yun-gyeong – recording
- Damon Sharpe – arrangement, composition
- Traci Hale – arrangement
- Sidnie Tipton – arrangement
- Mafly1 – lyrics
- Moon Seol-ri – lyrics
- So-yeon – chorus harmonies
- Maxx Song – recording
- Nancy Lawrence – mixing
- Swin Lee – arrangement, composition, keyboard, lyrics, recording
- Lee Tae-yun – bass guitar
- Lee Sang-yeon – guitar
- Kim Heon-cheol – mixing
- D+I – arrangement, composition, sound design, vocal direction, vocal production, drums, piano, synthesizer, guitar, recording, mixing
- Hathor – lyrics
- Lee Bu-reom – vocal production, backing vocals

== Charts ==
=== Weekly charts ===
Chart (2017)	Peak position
South Korea (Gaon Album Chart)	1

=== Monthly charts ===
Chart (2017)	Peak position
South Korea (Gaon Album Chart)	8

== Release history ==
Region	Date	Format	Label
South Korea	April 17, 2017	CD, digital download	NH Media
Worldwide	April 17, 2017	Digital download	NH Media
