= Han Gi-chan =

South Korean actor (born 1998)

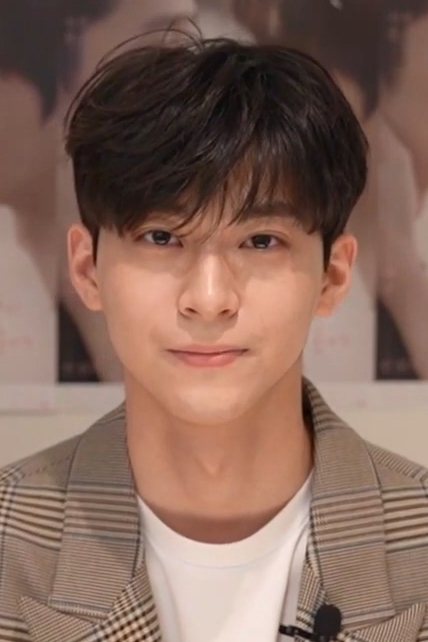
- Han in June 2020
- Born: September 6, 1998 (age 28); Seoul, South Korea
- Occupation: Actor
- Years active: 2018–present
- Agent: Fantagio

Korean name
- Hangul: 한기찬
- RR: Han Gichan
- MR: Han Kich'an

Han Gi-chan (Korean: 한기찬; born September 6, 1998) is a South Korean actor under Fantagio. He is best known for starring in the BL drama Where Your Eyes Linger (2020) and film The Wedding Banquet (2025).

== Early life ==
Han was born on September 6, 1998, in Seoul, South Korea. At his mother's insistence, he learned English by watching American children's TV shows, including Sesame Street and The Magic School Bus.

== Filmography ==
=== Film ===
Year	Title	Role	Notes	Ref.
2023	Our Song	Cheong-myeong	Main role	
2025	The Wedding Banquet	Min	Main role	
2025	The Haunted Police Station	Himself		

=== Television series ===
Year	Title	Role	Notes	Ref.
2018	Come and Hug Me	Boy on the beach	Minor role	
2019	Produce X 101	Himself	Contestant	
2021	Find Me If You Can	Yoo Go-gyeol		
2022	Again My Life	Kim Young-il	Cameo	
2022	Island	Himself	Guest role	
2023	Pandora: Beneath the Paradise	young Jang Do-jin		
2023	Boys' Voice	Himself	Contestant	
2024	Dare to Love Me	Kim Hong-hak	Supporting role	

=== Web series ===
Year	Title	Role	Notes	Ref.
2020	Where Your Eyes Linger	Han Tae-joo	Main role	
2021	Your Playlist	Cha Won-young	Main role	
2022	Ocean Likes Me	Han Ba-da	Main role	
2026	Physical Love Camp	Seo Jongwoo	Main role	
