= Kim Ho-jung =

South Korean actress (born 1968)

- Born: March 10, 1968 (age 58); Seoul, South Korea
- Occupation: Actress
- Agent: Just Entertainment

Korean name
- Hangul: 김호정
- RR: Gim Hojeong
- MR: Kim Hojŏng

Kim Ho-jung (Korean: 김호정; born March 10, 1968) is a South Korean actress. Kim's portrayal as an ailing wife in Im Kwon-taek's film Revivre (2015), who is dying of cancer, won her the Best Supporting Actress at the 51st Baeksang Arts Awards.

== Filmography ==
=== Film ===
Year	Title	Role	Notes/Ref.
2000	Barking Dogs Never Bite	Bae Eun-sil	
2000	Scent of Love		
2001	Nabi	Anna Kim	
2002	A Letter from Hiroshima		Short film
2004	Woman Is the Future of Man	Park Bo-young	Cameo, voice
2004	Springtime	Yeon-hee	
2006	Family Matters	Min-kyung	
2006	The Peter Pan Formula	Yoo In-hee	
2006	The Catch Man	Foreign woman	
2007	The Happy Life	Sun-mi	
2009	Where is Ronny...	Mi-seon	
2014	5 Minutes Serenade	Woman	Short film
2015	Revivre	Mr. Oh's wife	
2015	Madonna	Pimp	
2016	Will You Be There?	Hye-won	
2017	Fabricated City	Kwon Yoo's mom	
2018	Wretches	Ye-ri's mother	
2018	High Society	Heo Yoon-joo	
2018	Youngju	Hyang-sook	
2018	Memento Mori	Yoon-hee	
2019	The Beast	Madame Oh	
2019	A French Woman	Lee Mi-ra	
2020	Light for the Youth	Lee Se-yeon	
2022	Hommage		Special appearance
2024	The Mother and the Bear	Sara	
TBA	Taste of Horror – Four-Legged Beast		Short film

=== Television series ===
Year	Title	Role
2004	Tropical Nights in December	
2015	Heard It Through the Grapevine	Uhm So-jeong
2018	Evergreen	
2018	Mistress	Na Yoon-jung
2018	Partners for Justice	Oh Hwa-soo
2019	Arthdal Chronicles	Cho-seol
2019	Legal High	Professor Song
2020	Search	Yong Hee-ra
2021	Oh My Ladylord	Yoon Jung-hwa
2021	Reflection of You	Lee Jung-eun
2022	Doctor Lawyer	Jo Jung-hyun

== Awards and nominations ==
Year	Award	Category	Nominated work	Result
2000	1st Busan Film Critics Awards	Best Supporting Actress	Barking Dogs Never Bite	Won
2001	54th Locarno International Film Festival	Best Actress	Nabi	Won
2001	22nd Blue Dragon Film Awards	Best New Actress	Nabi	Nominated
2006	5th Korean Film Awards	Best Supporting Actress	The Peter Pan Formula	Nominated
2015	24th Buil Film Awards	Best Supporting Actress	Revivre	Nominated
2015	51st Baeksang Arts Awards	Best Supporting Actress	Revivre	Won
2015	35th Korean Association of Film Critics Awards	Best Actress	Revivre	Nominated
2015	16th Women in Film Korea Awards	Best Actress	Revivre	Won
2016	21st Chunsa Film Art Awards	Best Supporting Actress	Revivre	Nominated
2021	8th Wildflower Film Awards	Best Actress	A French Woman	Won
2021	2021 MBC Drama Awards	Excellence Award, Actress in a Miniseries	Oh My Ladylord	Nominated
