= Jeong So-yeon =

South Korean singer (born 1994)

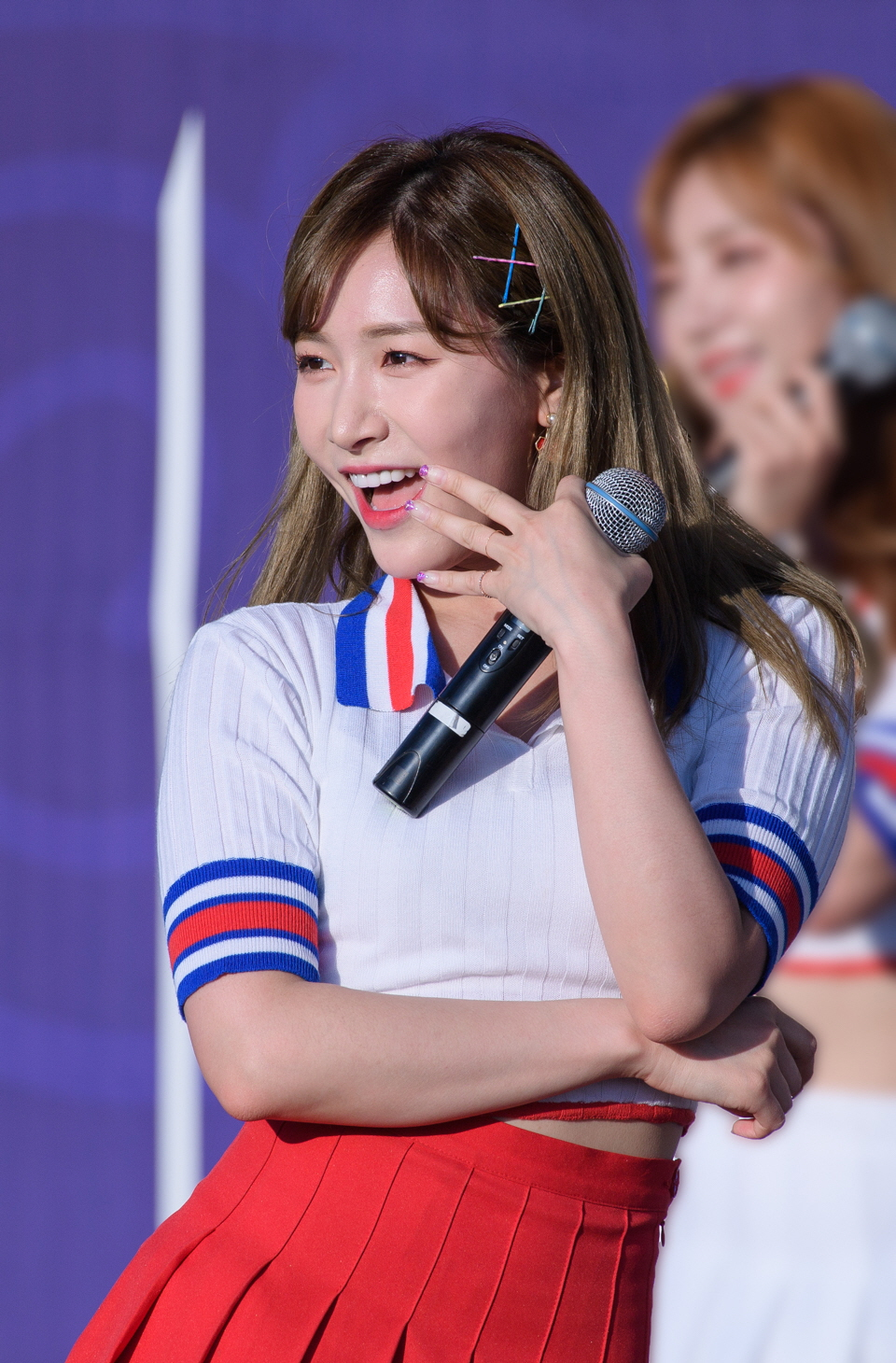
- Jeong in June 2017
- Born: May 4, 1994 (age 31); Gwangju, South Korea
- Occupation: Singer
- Musical career
- Genres: K-pop
- Instrument: Vocals
- Years active: 2014–present
- Labels: Interpark Music Plus; Global H
- Member of: Laboum; WSG Wannabe

Korean name
- Hangul: 정소연
- RR: Jeong Soyeon
- MR: Chŏng Soyŏn

Jeong So-yeon (Korean: 정소연; born May 4, 1994), known mononymously as Soyeon, is a South Korean singer. She debuted in 2014 as the vocalist of the South Korean girl group Laboum. In 2022, she became a member of the project supergroup WSG Wannabe.

== Early life and education ==
Jeong So-yeon was born in Gwangju on May 4, 1994. She attended Gwangju Cultural Middle School. In 2011, Jeong was a contestant on the South Korean television talent show series Superstar K 3, where she appeared with her school friend and fellow K-pop idol Bae Suzy.

== Music career ==
Jeong made her debut in August 2014 as the vocalist of the South Korean girl group Laboum. Aside from her group activities, she has participated in a number of soundtracks for South Korean television series since early in her career. She is an active songwriter and has composed songs for both Laboum and other artists, including the title track of Laboum's 2018 single album Between Us.

In 2016, Jeong was a cast member and contestant on the South Korean television singing competition Girl Spirit.

Following the resurgence of Laboum on South Korean music charts after they were featured on the reality/variety television show Hangout with Yoo, Jeong has auditioned on the show to become a member of the project supergroup WSG Wannabe. She successfully passed the audition and became a member of the Gaya-G sub-unit, which went on to claim a first place all-kill on South Korean music charts.

== Discography ==
=== Singles ===
Title	Year	Peak chart positions	Album
Title	Year	KOR Gaon	Album
Collaborations
"Thank you" (DJ Hanmin, Flawless, and DizzySunn)	2017	—	Non-album singles
"XOXO" (with Parc Jae-jung)	2018	—	Non-album singles
"The Prayer" (with Kim Yu-jeong)	2021	—	Non-album singles
"—" denotes releases that did not chart or were not released in that region.

=== Soundtrack appearances ===
Title	Year	Peak chart positions	Album
Title	Year	KOR Gaon	Album
"Love is cold"	2015	—	Sweet Home, Sweet Honey OST Part.4
"Cosmic Girl"	2017	—	Jugglers OST Part 1
"I Feel Love"	2017	—	Hospital Ship OST Part 4
"Don't Disappear" (사라지지 마) (with Kim Yu-jeong)	2018	—	Come and Hug Me OST Part 2
"Is It Love" (사랑일까) (with DinDin)	2019	—	My Strange Hero OST Part 6
"Let's Make Love" (사랑하자) (with Lee Jun-young)	2020	—	Good Casting OST Part 3
"Think of You" (당신생각)	2021	—	Youth of May OST Part 4
"You & I" (그대와) (with Choi Young-jae)	2021	—	My Roommate Is a Gumiho OST Part 7
"Come to Me, Always Your Smile" (다가와 늘 네 미소가)	2021	—	The All-Round Wife OST Part 1
"Starlight"	2022	—	If You Wish Upon Me OST Part 2
"—" denotes releases that did not chart or were not released in that region.

=== Composition credits ===
All song credits are adapted from the Korea Music Copyright Association's database, unless otherwise noted.

List of songs, showing year released, artist name, name of the album, and songwriting credits
Title	Year	Artist	Album	Lyricist	Composer
"Between Us" (체온)	2018	Laboum	Between Us	Yes	Yes
"XOXO"	2018	Jeong So-yeon, Parc Jae-jung	Non-album single	Yes	Yes
"Two of Us"	2019	Laboum	Two of Us	Yes	Yes
"Firework" (불꽃놀이)	2019	Laboum	Two of Us	Yes	No
"Satellite"	2019	Laboum	Two of Us	Yes	No
"Cheese" (치즈)	2020	Laboum	Non-album single	Yes	Yes
"Love On You" (새끼손가락)	2021	Laboum	Blossom	Yes	Yes
"How I Wish" (얼마나좋을까)	2021	Laboum	Blossom	Yes	Yes
"Kiss Kiss" (얼마나좋을까)	2021	Laboum	Blossom	Yes	No
"Closer"	2021	La Lima (라리마)	Imitation OST	Yes	No
"Diamond"	2021	Sparkling (스파클링)	Imitation OST	Yes	No

== Videography ==
=== Music videos ===
Title	Year	Director(s)	Ref.
"Thank You"	2016	Creative Khan (김광호 감독)	
"XOXO"	2018	Unknown	

== Filmography ==
=== Television shows ===
Year	Title	Role	Ref.
2011	Superstar K 3	Contestant	
2016	Girl Spirit	Contestant	
2019	King of Mask Singer	Contestant	
2022	Hangout with Yoo	Cast member	

== Awards and nominations ==
Name of the award ceremony, year presented, category, nominee of the award, and the result of the nomination
Award ceremony	Year	Category	Nominee / Work	Result	Ref.
Korea Culture and Entertainment Awards	2022	K-POP Singer Award	Jeong So-yeon	Won	
MBC Entertainment Awards	2022	Special Award - Variety Category (Note: with Gaya-G Lee Bo-ram, Soyeon, Hynn and Jung Ji-so)	Hangout with Yoo	Won	
