= Where Your Eyes Linger =

2020 South Korean web series

- Promotional poster
- Hangul: 너의 시선이 머무는 곳에
- RR: Neoui siseoni meomuneun gose
- MR: Nŏŭi sisŏni mŏmunŭn kose
- Genre: Boys' Love; Drama; Romance
- Written by: Hwang Da-seul; Shin Yoo
- Directed by: Hwang Da-seul
- Starring: Han Gi-chan; Jang Eui-soo; Choi Kyu-ri; Jeon Jae-young
- Opening theme: You by The Man Blk
- Country of origin: South Korea
- Original language: Korean
- No. of episodes: 8 (list of episodes)

Production
- Producer: Park Jong-sung
- Camera setup: Single camera
- Running time: 10–16 minutes
- Production companies: W-STORY; Energedic Company

Original release
- Release: May 22 – June 12, 2020

Where Your Eyes Linger (Korean: 너의 시선이 머무는 곳에) is a 2020 South Korean web series starring Han Gi-chan, Jang Eui-soo, Choi Kyu-ri, and Jeon Jae-young. It is an original drama of W-STORY, and is available for streaming on its platform from May 22 to June 12, 2020, with two episodes every Friday at 12:00 (KST) for 8 episodes. It is also available for streaming on Viki in over 200 countries.

The series has been dubbed as the first BL drama in Korea by the Bucheon International Fantastic Film Festival and various media outlets. It is also included in KTEN's best BL dramas of 2020 list.

The director's cut was released online through the streaming platforms Netflix, Wavve, TVING and Naver TV on July 16, 2020. The theatrical version of the series was screened on the 24th edition of Bucheon International Fantastic Film Festival and at the 80th Venice International Film Festival.

== Synopsis ==
Han Tae-joo, the heir of TB Group, is under the protection of Kang-gook who has been his best friend for fifteen years. The two share a master-servant relationship, with Kang-gook acting as Han Tae-joo's bodyguard. As they grow up, Kang-gook slowly realizes that he likes Han Tae-joo as more than friends, but realises that he has to keep it to himself. He cannot take his eyes off of Han Tae-joo, but neither can he get as close to him as he wants. Han Tae-joo, on the other hand, is a player who has had several girlfriends in the past, and who is confident and assertive. He knows all of Kang Gook's weaknesses, and enjoys pressing his buttons. The two friends share an unnaturally close friendship, often blurring the lines between friends and something more. Kang Gook often looks at Han Tae-joo with lingering looks of longing, and they share many charged moments of unresolved sexual tension. This state of affairs changes when Choi Hye-mi, a new female student, joins their high school and shows interest in Kang-gook. Han Tae-joo is forced to confront his feelings for Kang Gook. Throughout the story, Kang Gook tries to keep Han Tae-joo at arm's length. This leads to several occasions where Han Tae-joo, who is having none of it, pushes Kang Gook's boundaries.

== Cast ==
=== Main ===
- Han Gi-chan as Han Tae-joo
- Jang Eui-soo as Kang-gook
- Choi Kyu-ri as Choi Hye-mi
- Jeon Jae-young as Kim Pil-hyun

=== Supporting ===
- Jung Seo-in as Hye-mi's mother
- Cheon Seung-ho as Pil-hyun's friend

== Original soundtrack ==
The soundtrack for the series was released by Music&New on June 5, 2020.

Where Your Eyes Linger (Original Television Soundtrack)
No.	Title	Lyrics	Music	Artist	Length
1.	"YOU"	RUNY	RUNY, IVeR	THE MAN BLK	3:11
2.	"Light"	RUNY	RUNY, IVeR	KEUM JO	3:33
3.	"Looking At You" (널보면)	Jung Se-in	RUNY, Flum3n	RUNY	4:10
4.	"See U"	Kim Bo-young, Lee Gyeo-la	Kim Bo-young	Heo Jung	3:27
5.	"YOU" (Inst.)		RUNY, IVeR		3:11
6.	"Light" (Inst.)		RUNY, IVeR		3:33
7.	"Looking At You" (Inst.)		RUNY, Flum3n		4:10
8.	"See U" (Inst.)		Kim Bo-young		3:27
Total length:					28:42

== Episodes ==
No.	English title	Korean title	Directed by	Original release date
1	"Bad Habit"	안좋은 버릇	Hwang Da-seul	May 22, 2020
2	"A Relationship of Equals"	동등한 관계	Hwang Da-seul	May 22, 2020
3	"The Moment I Want to Run Away"	도망치고 싶은 순간	Hwang Da-seul	May 29, 2020
4	"The Shadow Became a Person"	그림자에게 생긴 자아	Hwang Da-seul	May 29, 2020
5	"Yet Another Kind of Gaze"	또 다른 시선	Hwang Da-seul	June 5, 2020
6	"15 Years of Friendship Come to an End"	15 년 우정의 마침표	Hwang Da-seul	June 5, 2020
7	"Reconciliation"	화해	Hwang Da-seul	June 12, 2020
8	"Because I Like You"	내가 널 좋아하니까	Hwang Da-seul	June 12, 2020

== International release ==
- In Japan, the series was released weekly on Rakuten TV.
- In Taiwan, the series was released weekly on Line TV.
- In Thailand and the Philippines, the series was released weekly on Tencent Video.
