= Oh My Ladylord =

2021 South korean television series

- Promotional poster
- Hangul: 오! 주인님
- Hanja: 오! 主人님
- Lit.: Oh! Master
- RR: O! Juinnim
- MR: O! Chuinnim
- Genre: Romantic comedy; Drama; Fantasy
- Created by: MBC Drama
- Written by: Jo Ji-kook
- Directed by: Oh Da-young
- Starring: Lee Min-ki; Nana; Kang Min Hyuk
- Country of origin: South Korea
- Original language: Korean
- No. of episodes: 16

Production
- Executive producer: Kim Seung-mo (MBC)
- Producer: Mina Kim
- Running time: 80 minutes
- Production company: Number Three Pictures

Original release
- Network: MBC
- Release: March 24 – May 13, 2021

Oh My Ladylord (Korean: 오! 주인님) is a 2021 South Korean television drama starring Lee Min-ki and Nana. Directed by Oh Da-young, the series tells a story of romance between a man who 'does not' love and a woman who 'can't' love. It aired on terrestrial television channel MBC from March 24 to May 13, 2021, on Wednesdays and Thursdays at 21.30 (KST) for 16 episodes. It is available on iQIYI as "Oh! Master" with subtitles in multiple languages globally.

Oh My Ladylord's average rating of 1.6% is the second lowest ever recorded for a Korean drama airing on a prime time slot on a free-to-air television network, with KBS2 drama Love All Play setting the new record low of 1.4% a year later in 2022. The first half of the twelfth episode of Oh My Ladylord drew a 0.9% rating, tying with the penultimate episode of Love All Play to become the second-lowest single-episode rating ever (KBS2 drama Welcome saw a lower figure of 0.8% in 2020). Additionally, Oh My Ladylord was the first full-length prime time drama on free TV to never have rated above 3%. Media observers have cited Oh My Ladylord as an example of the downfall of MBC, which used to be regarded as the "Drama Kingdom" in the 1990s.

== Synopsis ==
In one corner we have a drama screenwriter and in the other, a rom-com actress. While the writer chooses not to date, the actress cannot seem to date. The story unfolds as they find themselves sharing the same living quarters.

== Cast ==
=== Main ===
- Lee Min-ki as Han Bi-soo
  - A thriller drama screenwriter who can't date. He had a traumatic event at the age of 18 that affects him to this day.
- Nana as Oh Joo-in
  - A popular rom-com actress who is not good with her own romantic relationships. Her one and only goal all along is to provide for her family and to return to the home she grew up in.
- Kang Min-hyuk as Yu Jin
  - Close friend of Joo-in since high school. He has been a successful artist abroad and returned to Korea in order to confess his love to Joo-in.

=== Supporting ===
- Lee Hwi-hyang as Kang Hae-jin, Han Bi-soo's mother
- Sunwoo Jae-duk as Han Min-joon, Han Bi-soo's father
- Kim Ho-jung as Yoon Jung-hwa, Oh Joo-in's mother
- Bae Hae-sun as Jung Sang-eun
- Lee Jung-gil
- Woo Hee-jin as Kim Yi-na
- Park Joo-hee as Oh Hee-jung
- Kim Chang-wan as Kim Chang-gyu, owner of Just Records
- Cha Min-ji as Choi In-young
- Jang Eui-su as Park Geon-ho

=== Special appearances ===
- Kim Woo-jin as staff
- Ahn Sol-bin as Kim Ji-yeon

== Production ==
In 2021, Oh Da-young replaced Hyeon Sol-ip as director, after the latter was fired from the production. Oh Da-young's past credits as assistant director include Let's Eat 2, Woman with a Suitcase, The Guardians, Bad Papa, and The Golden Garden.

== Viewership ==
Average TV viewership ratings
Ep.	Part	Original broadcast date	Average audience share (Nielsen Korea)
Ep.	Part	Original broadcast date	Nationwide
1	1	March 24, 2021	2.1%
1	2	March 24, 2021	2.6%
2	1	March 25, 2021	1.8%
2	2	March 25, 2021	2.2%
3	1	March 31, 2021	1.8%
3	2	March 31, 2021	2.0%
4	1	April 1, 2021	2.0%
4	2	April 1, 2021	1.8%
5	1	April 8, 2021	1.3%
5	2	April 8, 2021	1.6%
6	1	April 8, 2021	1.9%
6	2	April 8, 2021	1.5%
7	1	April 14, 2021	1.5%
7	2	April 14, 2021	1.7%
8	1	April 15, 2021	1.3%
8	2	April 15, 2021	1.4%
9	1	April 21, 2021	1.3%
9	2	April 21, 2021	1.5%
10	1	April 22, 2021	1.6%
10	2	April 22, 2021	1.2%
11	1	April 28, 2021	1.5%
11	2	April 28, 2021	1.6%
12	1	April 29, 2021	0.9%
12	2	April 29, 2021	1.1%
13	1	May 5, 2021	1.5%
13	2	May 5, 2021	1.6%
14	1	May 6, 2021	1.6%
14	2	May 6, 2021	1.5%
15	1	May 12, 2021	1.4%
15	2	May 12, 2021	1.2%
16	1	May 13, 2021	1.7%
16	2	May 13, 2021	1.6%
Average			1.6%

- In this table, the blue numbers represent the lowest ratings and the red numbers represent the highest ratings.
- N/A denotes that the rating is not known.
- Did not air on April 7 due to election broadcasts and therefore aired two episodes in a row on April 8.

== Awards and nominations ==
Year	Award	Category	Recipient	Result
2021	40th MBC Drama Awards	Top Excellence Award, Actress in a Miniseries	Nana	Nominated
2021	40th MBC Drama Awards	Excellence Award, Actor in a Miniseries	Kang Min-hyuk	Nominated
2021	40th MBC Drama Awards	Excellence Award, Actress in a Miniseries	Kim Ho-jung	Nominated
2021	40th MBC Drama Awards	Best Supporting Actor	Song Yoo-taek	Nominated
2021	40th MBC Drama Awards	Best Supporting Actress	Lee Hwi-hyang	Nominated
2021	40th MBC Drama Awards	Best Couple	Lee Min-ki & Nana	Nominated
2021	40th MBC Drama Awards	Best New Actor	Jang Eui-soo	Nominated
2021	40th MBC Drama Awards	Best New Actress	Ahn Sol-bin	Nominated
