= Revivre =

- Film poster
- Directed by: Im Kwon-taek
- Written by: Song Yoon-hee
- Based on: Cremation by Kim Hoon
- Produced by: Shim Jae-myung
- Starring: Ahn Sung-ki; Kim Gyu-ri; Kim Ho-jung
- Cinematography: Kim Hyung-koo
- Edited by: Park Sun-duck; Steve M. Choi
- Music by: Kim Soo-chul
- Production company: Myung Films
- Distributed by: Little Big Pictures
- Release dates: September 3, 2014 (Venice); April 9, 2015 (South Korea)
- Running time: 93 minutes
- Country: South Korea
- Language: Korean
- Box office: US$958,934

Revivre (Korean: 화장; RR: Hwajang; lit. 'Cremation; Cosmetics') is a 2014 South Korean drama film directed by Im Kwon-taek and starring Ahn Sung-ki. It premiered in the Out of Competition section of the 71st Venice International Film Festival in 2014, and was released in South Korean theaters on April 9, 2015.

The film is based on Kim Hoon's short story "Cremation" (also translated as "From Powder to Powder"), which won the Yi Sang Literary Award in 2004.

== Plot ==
Mr. Oh is in his mid-fifties and is a successful marketing executive (sangmoo or managing director) at a major cosmetics company. He struggles to juggle corporate life and preparing for a new ad campaign, while tirelessly caring for his ailing wife, whose health has steadily and painfully deteriorated in the last four years due to brain cancer. During this difficult time, Oh also becomes aware of his growing feelings for Choo Eun-joo, the much younger, alluring new addition to his marketing team. When his wife finally succumbs to her disease, Oh becomes conflicted over his profound grief and newfound passion.

== Cast ==
- Ahn Sung-ki as Mr. Oh
- Kim Gyu-ri as Choo Eun-joo
- Kim Ho-jung as Oh's wife
- Jeon Hye-jin as Oh Mi-young, his daughter
- Yeon Woo-jin as Kim Min-soo, Mi-young's husband
- Shin Young-jin as Oh's sister-in-law
- Kim Gi-cheon as Buddhist devotee Lee
- Kim Byeong-choon as Department head Jo
- Kim Young-hoon as Section chief Jung
- Kim Hyun-ah as Section chief Park
- Park Jeong-sik as Deputy Kim
- Seo Young-joo as So-young
- Yoo Yeon as Marketing team secretary
- Han Eu-ddeum as Advertising model candidate
- Min Kyeong-jin as Dr. Choi, urology specialist
- Cha Chung-hwa as Dr. Choi, urology nurse
- Joo Hyun as Chairman (cameo)
- Ahn Suk-hwan as Director Ahn (cameo)
- Ye Ji-won as Dance master (cameo)
- Bae Han-seong as Executive director Song (cameo)

== Awards and nominations ==
Year	Award	Category	Recipient	Result
2015	51st Paeksang Arts Awards	Best Film	Revivre	Won
2015	51st Paeksang Arts Awards	Best Director	Im Kwon-taek	Nominated
2015	51st Paeksang Arts Awards	Best Actor	Ahn Sung-ki	Nominated
2015	51st Paeksang Arts Awards	Best Supporting Actress	Kim Ho-jung	Won
2015	10th APN Awards	Recipient	Ahn Sung-ki	Won
2015	24th Buil Film Awards	Best Director	Im Kwon-taek	Nominated
2015	24th Buil Film Awards	Best Actor	Ahn Sung-ki	Nominated
2015	24th Buil Film Awards	Best Supporting Actress	Kim Ho-jung	Nominated
2015	24th Buil Film Awards	Best Cinematography	Kim Hyung-koo	Nominated
2015	35th Korean Association of Film Critics Awards	Top 10 Films of the Year	Revivre	Won
