= Kim Nam-hee =

South Korean actor

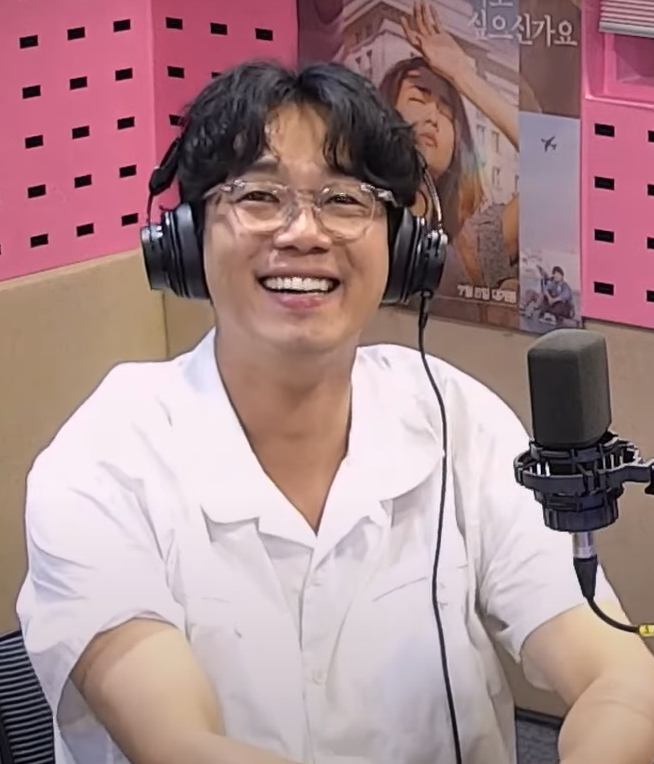
- Kim in June 2023
- Born: Kim Nam-hee; 25 May 1986 (age 40); South Korea
- Education: Seokyeong University – BA in Theater and Film
- Occupation: Actor
- Years active: 2009–present
- Agent: C-JeS entertainment
- Spouse: Unknown (m. 2018)

Korean name
- Hangul: 김남희
- Hanja: 金南希
- RR: Gim Namhui
- MR: Kim Namhŭi

Kim Nam-hee is a South Korean actor. He is known for his roles in dramas Mr. Sunshine, Spring Turns to Spring, and Sweet Home.

== Career ==
He started acting in short and independent film since 2009. However his professional debut as actor was a minor role in feature film No Breathing in 2013. Kim has an extensive background in theater, having performed in several plays such as 'Maids', 'Custody Claim' (2015), 'Brother's Night' (2016), 'Wake Up Hamlet', 'The Sky at the Amusement Park is Always', and 'In the Middle of the Sea' in the previous year. This solid stage experience has enabled him to firmly establish himself in any role.

In 2017, Kim played the role of a stalker in the drama Band of Sisters and left a strong impression on viewers. He also gained recognition for his short but impactful acting in director Lee Eung-bok's Guardian: The Lonely and Great God, where he played a doctor trying to save lives without realizing his own fate. His breakthrough role came in Mr. Sunshine, where he played Takashi Mori, a Japanese character speaking Korean and English with incredible precision. He got the role through audition. Through his role he won Best Supporting Actor from Korean Cultural Award.

Since then, in 2019 he has appeared in Spring Turns to Spring and Search: WWW.

He has also gained attention for his performances in commercials, including one for a construction company where he played a newlywed, and one for a hamburger brand where he portrayed a quiet, caring father whose child is sleeping.

Kim accepted role in film Where Would You Like to Go without reading the script.

== Personal life ==
He got married on September 29, 2018, to his long-term girlfriend whom he has dated for 10 years since his college days. Senior actor Lee Deok-hwa officiated the wedding.

== Filmography ==
=== Film ===
| Year | Title | Role | Notes | Ref. |
|---|---|---|---|---|
| 2009 | How are you these days | Friend | Short Film | |
| 2009 | To her | Jun-won | Short Film | |
| 2010 | Hello, Guyang Shingoong | Nam-hee | Short Film | |
| 2010 | fourth confession | man kicked three times | Short Film | |
| 2011 | Moonlight Sonata | Mr. Hyun | | |
| 2011 | Autumn of that year | Sang-min | Short Film | |
| 2011 | Sunny summer is back | Fan | Short Film | |
| 2012 | Ordeal | Nam-hee | Independent Film | |
| 2013 | No Breathing | Won's friend 2 | | |
| 2013 | Youth Prayer | Kwon-yun | | |
| 2014 | Animal | Tae-pyeong | | |
| 2014 | The Stone | Sectarianism | | |
| 2014 | None is okay | Su-ho | Short Film | |
| 2014 | My wife | Jun-hyeok | Short Film | |
| 2016 | The Great Actor | Devil's Blood Directing Team 2 | | |
| 2018 | The Witness | Kim Dae-ri | | |
| 2023 | Where Would You Like to Go? | Do-gyeong | | |
| 2023 | Work To Do | Nam-hee | | |
| 2026 | The Eyes | Seo-jin | | |
| TBA | Canvas of Blood | | | |

=== Television series ===
| Year | Title | Role | Notes | Ref. |
|---|---|---|---|---|
| 2012 | Dream of Three Men, Father | Shim Nam-hui | | |
| 2015 | The Missing | Jailer | Cameo | |
| 2016 | Guardian: The Lonely and Great God | Choi Young-jae / Overworked doctor in ER | Cameo (Episode 3) | |
| 2017 | Band of Sisters | Choi Young-hoon / Choi Ji-hoon | | |
| 2017 | Tunnel | Yoon-hui | Bit Part (Episode 7) | |
| 2018 | Mr. Sunshine | Colonel Takeshi Mori | | |
| 2019 | Spring Turns to Spring | Heo Bom-il | | |
| 2019 | Search: WWW | Pyo Joon-soo | | |
| 2020 | Find Me in Your Memory | Drama Director | Cameo (Episode 11) | |
| 2021 | On the Verge of Insanity | Shin Han-soo | | |
| 2021 | You Are My Spring | Kim Nam-hee | Cameo (Episode 9–10) | |
| 2021 | High Class | Ahn Ji-young | | |
| 2022 | Twenty-Five Twenty-One | Mobile store salesperson | Cameo (Episode 16) | |
| 2022 | O'PENing – Don't Announce Your Husband's Death | Yoon Jae-young | one act-drama; season 5 | |
| 2022 | The Law Cafe | Park Woo-jin | | |
| 2022 | Reborn Rich | Jin Seong-joon | | |
| 2023 | Family: The Unbreakable Bond | Cho Tae-gu | | |
| 2024 | Bitter Sweet Hell | Jae-jin | | |
| 2024 | Chicken Nugget | Kim Hwan-dong | | |
| 2026 | A Love Other Than Yours | Lee Young-do | | |

=== Web series ===
| Year | Title | Role | Notes | Ref. |
|---|---|---|---|---|
| 2020 | Sweet Home | Jung Jae-heon / Jayhun | Season 1 | |
| 2021 | Mad for Each Other | Seon Ho | | |
| 2022 | Glitch | Ma Hyung-woo | | |
| 2024 | Begins ≠ Youth | Song Jun-ho | | |

=== Television shows ===
| Year | Title | Role | Ref. |
|---|---|---|---|
| 2023 | Very Private Southeast Asia | Cast Member | |

=== Hosting ===
| Year | Title | Notes | Ref. |
|---|---|---|---|
| 2023 | Opening ceremony 20th EBS International Documentary Film Festival | EIDF2023 | |

== Theater ==
| Year | Title | | Role | Ref. |
| Year | English | Korean | Role | Ref. |
|---|---|---|---|---|
| 2015 | Maids | 하녀들 | | |
| 2015 | Custody claim case | 부양권청구 소송사건 | | |
| 2016 | Brother's night | 형제의 밤 | Su-dong | |
| 2016 | Wake Up Hamlet | Wake Up 햄릿 | Hamlet | |
| 2016 | The sky at the amusement park is always blue | 놀이공원의 하늘은 언제나 푸르다 | | |
| 2016,2019 | The sky at the amusement park is always blue | 놀이공원의 하늘은 언제나 푸르다 | | |
| 2020 | In the middle of the sea | 바다 한가운데서 | | |

== Awards and nominations ==
Name of the award ceremony, year presented, category, nominee of the award, and the result of the nomination
| Award ceremony | Year | Category | Nominee / Work | Result | Ref. |
|---|---|---|---|---|---|
| Asia Model Awards | 2025 | Rising Star Award – Actor | Kim Nam-hee | Won | |
| Korea Cultural Entertainment Awards | 2018 | Best Supporting Actor | Mr. Sunshine | Won | |
| MBC Drama Awards | 2021 | Best Supporting Actor | On the Verge of Insanity | Nominated | |
| MBC Drama Awards | 2025 | Best Supporting Actor | Moon River | Won | |
