= Cha Chung-hwa =

South Korean actress (born 1980)

- 차청화
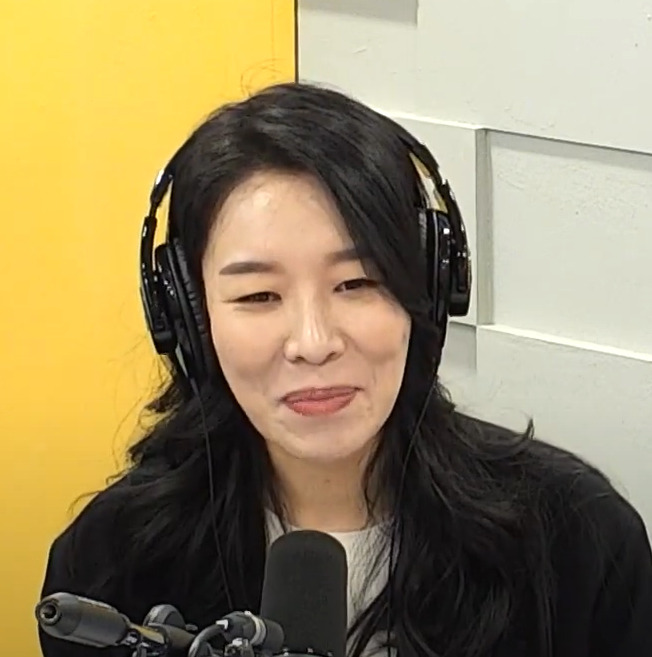
- Cha in April 2021
- Born: 28 April 1980 (age 46); Suwon, South Korea
- Other name: Cha Cheong-hwa
- Education: Sangmyung University – Department of Theatre
- Occupations: Television actress; musical actress
- Years active: 2005–present
- Agent: Management Seesun
- Spouse: Unknown (m. 2023)
- Children: 1

Korean name
- Hangul: 차청화
- Hanja: 車清華
- RR: Cha Cheonghwa
- MR: Ch'a Ch'ŏnghwa

Cha Chung-hwa (Korean: 차청화; born on 28 April 1980) is a South Korean character actress active in theater, film, and television. She was nominated for a Baeksang Arts Award for her role as court lady Choi in the tvN historical drama Mr. Queen (2020–21). She is also known for her roles in the television series Crash Landing on You (2019), Hometown Cha-Cha-Cha (2021), and Dr. Park's Clinic (2022), as well as films such as As One (2012), Train to Busan (2016), and Pawn (2020).

After graduating from the Department of Theatre at Sangmyung University, Cha debuted onstage in 2005. She developed her acting skills through appearances in popular Daehak-ro productions like Lunatic, Sheer Madness, and Suspicious Heungsinso. She continued to work in various roles, including supporting and multiple roles, in plays such as Late Night Restaurant, Midnight Serenade, and Heavy Metal Girls.

== Early years and education ==
Born and raised in Gwangmyeong, Gyeonggi Province, was a model student throughout her primary and secondary education. She served as class president during her elementary, middle, and high school years, and attended a top-ranked high school in Gwangmyeong.

While she initially aspired to enter politics and become president, her interests shifted during high school toward television, film, and music. Inspired by singer Park Jin-young, Cha developed a future goal to become an "all-around entertainer." Although her parents encouraged her to study accounting to ensure a stable career, she remained committed to the performing arts. She subsequently applied to and enrolled in the Department of Theatre at Sangmyung University.

== Career ==
=== 2006–2016: Early career and theater roles ===
In 2006, at the age of 25, Cha debuted as a musical actress in Daehak-ro, performing multiple roles in the musical Backstreet Story. Following her university graduation, she held various positions in other industries, including a role as a shopping mall buyer and an internship at an advertising and public relations firm. She later returned to acting after determining these career paths were not suitable for her.

Cha began her film career in 2010 with a minor role in Harmony, starring Kim Yun-jin, and she gradually expanded her filmography by working in both films and musicals. In January 2011, she was selected for the role of Kwon Young-hwa in the Korean encore performance of the play Shear Madness following a competitive audition process. Her selection was influenced by her performances in previous musicals such as March of Youth and Runatic.

In 2012, Cha appeared in a minor role in the film As One (2012). She also played one of the "Ochazuke sisters" in the musical adaptation of the Japanese manga Shin'ya Shokudō (深夜食堂; lit. "Midnight Diner"), directed by Kim Dong-yeon. The series had already been adapted into a Japanese drama called Midnight Diner in 2009. In 2014, she reprised this role. Cha also performed multiple characters in a revival of the musical Oh! While You Were Sleeping, directed by Jang Yu-jeong.

In 2015, Cha was cast as Park Jung-ja in the musical Midnight Serenade. She first became interested in the production while filming the 2009 film Harmony, after observing a senior colleague preparing for an audition. Following a recommendation from a fellow performer, Cha successfully auditioned for the 2015 revival of the musical. In 2015, Cha made her television debut with a supporting role in the MBC drama Shopping King Louie. This role marked her transition into mainstream broadcasting and was followed by a series of increasingly prominent television appearances.

In 2016, Cha appeared in the play Heavy Metal Girls as Jung-min, a dedicated researcher facing a sudden layoff after sixteen years of employment. Her performance was noted for its sincerity and its realistic portrayal of the character's professional struggles.

=== Breakthrough ===
In 2019, Cha was cast in a supporting role in the tvN miniseries Crash Landing on You, starring Hyun Bin and Son Ye-jin. She portrayed Yang Ok-geum, a former North Korean announcer and hairdresser responsible for public announcements within a corporate housing complex. Her character was noted for her distinct aesthetic, characterized by elaborate makeup and costumes. Cha's performance, particularly her onscreen rapport with co-star Kim Sun-young (who played Na Wol-suk), was highlighted as a notable aspect of the series' ensemble.

In 2020, Cha was cast as Court Lady Choi in the tvN historical fantasy drama Mr. Queen, acting opposite Shin Hye-sun. Her performance garnered significant public attention, with the actress frequently appearing in real-time search trends during the series' broadcast. For her portrayal, Cha received critical acclaim and earned a nomination for Best Supporting Actress at the Baeksang Arts Awards. The visibility of this role led to increased appearances on various variety and talk programs.

Following the success of Mr. Queen, Cha appeared in several projects throughout 2021. She made a guest appearance in the JTBC thriller Beyond Evil as Lee Geum-hwa, a character involved in the central investigation. In the KBS2 series At a Distance, Spring Is Green, she portrayed Professor Song. Cha also starred in the office drama On the Verge of Insanity, acting alongside Jung Jae-young and Moon So-ri. She played Shin Jong-ah, a former finance team head who returns to the Changin Business Department as a contract manager. In July 2021, Cha joined the cast of the rebooted variety program Saturday Night Live Korea.

In August 2021, Cha was cast in a supporting role in the tvN drama Hometown Cha-Cha-Cha, appearing alongside Shin Min-a and Kim Seon-ho. She portrayed Cho Nam-seok, a Chinese restaurant owner and a prominent source of village rumors. Her chemistry with Shin and Lee Bong-ryun received widespread praise. In September 2021, she secured the role of nurse Choi Mi-yeong in the TVING original series Dr. Park's Clinic, which subsequently premiered in January 2022.

On January 19, 2022, Cha signed an exclusive contract with YNK Entertainment. she was cast in the SBS legal drama Why Her as professor of family medicine. This was followed by a guest appearance in the June 2022 series Cleaning Up, where she portrayed the sister-in-law of Su-ja (played by Kim Jae-hwa).

In 2023, Cha joined the MBC drama Kokdu: Season of Deity as Gaksin, the god of rumor. She also held a role in the SBS series My Demon, portraying a divine entity appearing as a homeless woman. In April 2025, Cha signed an exclusive contract with Management Seesun.

== Personal life ==
On October 11, 2023, Cha’s agency announced her upcoming marriage to a businessman, which took place in Seoul on October 27, 2023. The private ceremony was attended by family and close associates. On January 24, 2024, Cha announced her first pregnancy; she subsequently gave birth to a daughter later that year.

== Filmography ==
=== Films ===
Key
†	Denotes films that have not yet been released

List of film appearances
Year	Title	Role	Ref.
2010	Harmony	Harmony Choir, chase woman	
2010	Try to Remember	Ork girl / Single Bodhisattva	
2012	As One	Korea cheering team	
2012	Almost Che	Dong-sook	
2012	Confession of Murder	Jang Jin-gak	
2013	How to Use Guys with Secret Tips	Bo-na's friend 2	
2013	Steal My Heart	Human rights organization representative	
2014	Revivre	Dr. Choi, urology nurse	
2016	Don't Forget Me	Wedding Staff	
2016	The Map Against the World	Jeong Ho-jib madang anag	
2016	Train to Busan	Middle aged woman (zombie)	
2020	Pawn	Byeong-dal's wife	
2022	Birth	Kim A-gi	
2023	Brave Citizen	Lee Jae-kyeong	

=== Television series ===
Key
†	Denotes television productions that have not yet been released

List of television series appearances
Year	Title	Role	Note	Ref.
2016	Shopping King Louie	Kwon Mi-young		
2017	Black	Clara		
2017	Black Knight: The Man Who Guards Me	Team Leader		
2018	The Ghost Detective	Han Sang-seop's wife		
2019	Hotel del Luna	Water demon / Detective Lee	Cameo	
2019	The Fiery Priest	Ahn Dul-ja		
2019–2020	Crash Landing on You	Yang Ok-geum		
2020	Itaewon Class	Bureau Chief's wife	Cameo (Ep.3)	
2020	Eccentric! Chef Moon	Pi Gon-sook		
2020–2021	Mr. Queen	Choi Sanggung	Queen Cheorin's devoted lady-in-waiting	
2021	Beyond Evil	Lee Geum-hwa		
2021	At a Distance, Spring Is Green	Professor Song		
2021	Hospital Playlist	Yeon-woo's mom	Season 2; Cameo (Ep.1)	
2021	On the Verge of Insanity	Kim Jung-ah		
2021	Hometown Cha-Cha-Cha	Jo Nam-sook		
2022	Dr. Park's Clinic	Choi Mi-yeong		
2022	Why Her	Chae Joon-hee		
2022	Cleaning Up	Dongseo	Cameo (Ep. 3)	
2023	Kokdu: Season of Deity	Gaksin		
2023	See You in My 19th Life	Kim Ae-kyung		
2023	Song of the Bandits	Kim Seon-bok		
2023–2024	My Demon	a homeless gambler / god	Cameo	
2025	The Haunted Palace	Yeong-geum		
2025	Spring of Youth	Kim Ja-young		
2026–2027	Nine to Six †	Lee Jung-eun		

=== Television shows ===
Year	Title	Role	Ref.
2020	Happy Together	"My Acting Class" Special	
2021	Saturday Night Live Korea	Cast member	
2021	On & Off	Cast member	
2007	Actors' Association	Cast member	

== Stage ==
=== Musical ===
List of Musical Play(s)
Year	Title		Role	Theater	Date	Ref.
Year	English	Korean	Role	Theater	Date	Ref.
2005–2006	Backstreet Story	뒷골목 스토리		Egg Nucleus Small Theater	Dec 23 – Jan 22	
2008	Medical Lunatic	메디컬 루나틱	Ko Dok-hae	Sejong Center for the Performing Arts M Theater	July 8 – Aug 29	
2008	March of Youth	젊음의 행진	Wolsuk	KEPCO Art Center	Nov 7 – Dec 31	
2011–2012	Medical Lunatic	메디컬 루나틱	Ko Dok-hae	Sungkyunkwan University 600th Anniversary Hall New Millennium Hall	Apr 15 – Feb 22	
2012–2013	Midnight Diner	심야식당	Ochazuke Sisters — Salted Mentaiko	Dongsung Art Center Dongsung Hall	Dec 11 – Feb 17	
2013	2013 Seoul Musical Festival Closing Gala Show	2013 서울뮤지컬페스티벌 폐막갈라쇼	Herself	Chungmu Art Center Grand Theater	Aug 12	
2013–2014	Oh! While You Were Sleeping	오! 당신이 잠든 사이	Multiroles	Daehangno Arts Center	Sep 6 – Mar 16	
2014–2015	Midnight Diner	심야식당	Ochazuke Sisters — Salted Mentaiko	Daehangno Musical Center Middle Theater	Nov 16 – Jan 18	
2015	Midnight Serenade	한밤의 세레나데	Park Jung-ja	Art One Theater Hall 2	Mar 20 – May 21	
2015	Bachelor Vegetable Shop	총각네 야채가게	Multi-roles Woman	KEPCO Art Center	Nov 13 – Dec 31	
2016	2016 Global Musical Live Showcase	2016 글로컬 뮤지컬 라이브 쇼케이스	Herself	Lee Ha-rang Arts Theater	Jan 30 – Feb 03	
2016	Heavy Metal Girls	헤비메탈 걸스	Min-jeong	Plus Theater (Culturspace NU)	Mar 15 – Jun 15	
2016	Bachelor Vegetable Shop	총각네 야채가게	Multi-roles Woman	Suwon SK Atrium Grand Performance Hall	Jul 23	
2016	Bachelor Vegetable Shop	총각네 야채가게	Multi-roles Woman	Art One Theater Hall 2	Nov 19 – Dec 31	
2019	Lee Seon-dong Clean Center	이선동 클린센터	The grandmother	Daehakro SH Art Hall	Oct 4 – Nov 10	

=== Theater ===
List of Theater Play(s)
Year	Title		Role	Theater	Date	Ref.
Year	English	Korean	Role	Theater	Date	Ref.
2010–2011	Sheer Madness	쉬어매드니스	Kwon Young-hwa	Sangmyung Art Hall 1	Feb 2 – Jan 9	
2012	Suspicious Heusingno	수상한 흥신소	Multi roles including Oh Deok-hee	Samyung Art Hall 1	Jan 10 – Aug 19	
2012	Youth Band	청춘밴드 블루스프링	Lee In-hee	Suwon Youth Culture Center Onnuri Art Hall	Jul 12 – Jul 15	
2012	Youth Band	청춘밴드 블루스프링	Lee In-hee	Small Theater Wilderness (Former Daehangno Arts Theater 3)	Jul 20 – Aug 12	
2012	Youth Band	청춘밴드 블루스프링	Lee In-hee	Gangdong Art Center Small Theater Dream	Aug 15 – Sep 02	
2013	Knife Handle	칼잡이	multi	Sejong Center for the Performing Arts M Theater	Apr 12–28	
2013	Knife Handle	칼잡이	multi	Guro Art Valley Arts Theater	Jun 20–22	
2013	Suspicious Heusingno	수상한 흥신소	Multi roles including Oh Deok-hee	H Theater	May 31 – Nov 03	
2013–2015	Secret Diary	시크릿 다이어리	Park Dong-soon	H Theater	Nov 21 – Feb 01	
2016	Come See Me	배우 날 보러와요	Mrs. Nam	Yes24 Stage2	Sep 21 – Dec 11	
2017	Come See Me	배우 날 보러와요	Mrs. Nam	Icheon Art Hall Small Performance Hall	Feb 17–18	

== Awards and nominations ==
Name of the award ceremony, year presented, category, nominee of the award, and the result of the nomination
Award ceremony	Year	Category	Nominee / Work	Result	Ref.
Baeksang Arts Awards	2021	Best Supporting Actress – Television	Mr. Queen	Nominated	
MBC Drama Awards	2021	Best Supporting Actress	On the Verge of Insanity	Nominated	
MBC Drama Awards	2023	Best Supporting Actress	Kokdu: Season of Deity	Won	
SBS Drama Awards	2025	Excellence Award, Actress in a Miniseries Humanity/Fantasy Drama	The Haunted Palace	Won	
