= Laboum =

South Korean girl group

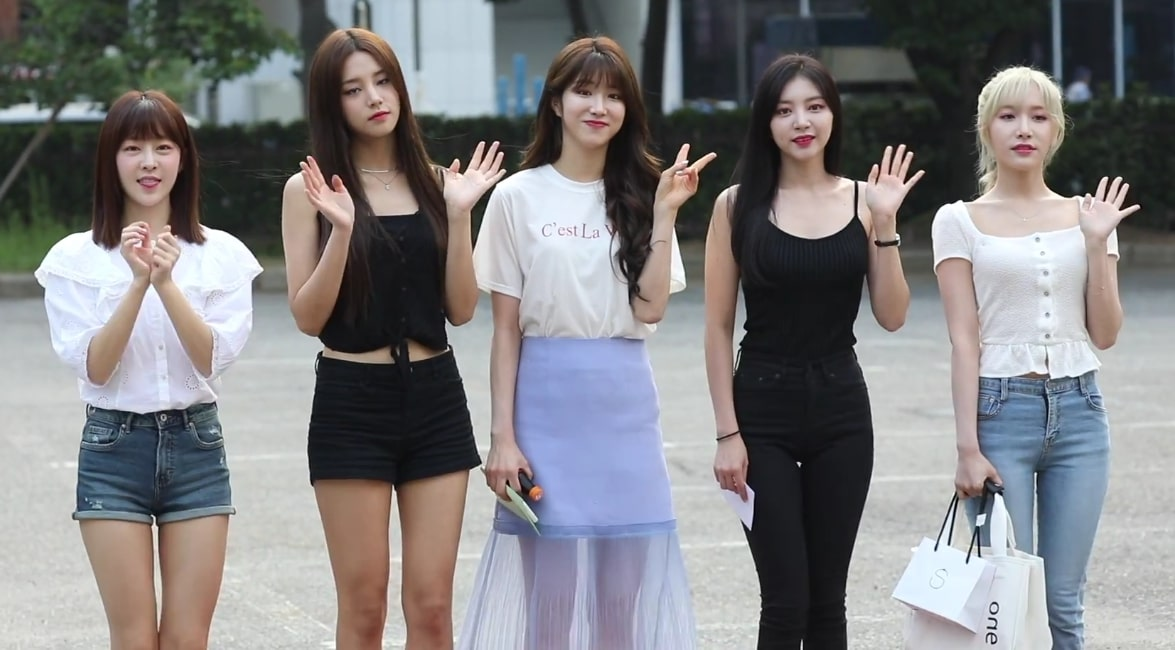
- Laboum in July 2018; L-R: Yujeong (former), Solbin, Jinyea, Haein, Soyeon

Background information
- Origin: Seoul, South Korea
- Genre: K-pop
- Years active: 2014–2022 (Note: Indefinite hiatus)
- Labels: Global H; Interpark Music Plus; Nippon Columbia
- Members: Yujeong; Soyeon; Jinyea; Haein; Solbin
- Past members: Yulhee
- Website: laboum.net

Laboum (Korean: 라붐; stylized in all caps) is a South Korean girl group currently under Interpark Music Plus, the group consists of: Soyeon, Jinyea, Haein and Solbin, original members, Yulhee left in 2017 followed by leader Yujeong in 2021. They debuted in 2014 under NH Media and Nega Network's joint venture Global H. Their name is taken from the French term meaning "The Party".

== History ==
=== 2014: Debut with Petit Macaron ===
In August 2014, NH Media and Nega Network announced the upcoming debut girl group Laboum, who had been training for four years. The group was touted as a sister group to NH Media's U-KISS and Nega Network's Brown Eyed Girls.

Laboum released their debut single album Petit Macaron on August 28, 2014, following the release of their music video for title track "Pit-A-Pat" the day before. The song was written by Seo Ji-eum, known for hits such as f(x)'s "Electric Shock" and TaeTiSeo's "Twinkle", and composed by Jung Jae-yeob.

On October 24, Laboum announced that they would come back with Petit Macaron DATA PACK, a Petit Macaron re-release with extra digital contents, and a reworking of the track "What About You?". On October 31, the group held a comeback performance on Music Bank and released the song's music video, which featured a clockwork doll theme. Petit Macaron DATA PACK was released on November 3.

=== 2015: Sugar Sugar and Aalow Aalow ===
In late February 2015, ZN was cast to star opposite U-KISS' Kevin in the two "Milky Love" episodes of the omnibus web drama About Love. Both episodes were released on March 2 on Naver TV Cast.

On March 16, Laboum announced they would come back with a more mature yet refreshing concept in "Sugar Sugar", which would feature a slumber party theme. Their second single album "Sugar Sugar" was released on August 14. Yujeong was a guest on a May episode of the popular radio program Kiss the Radio, hosted by Super Junior.

In June, Solbin was cast in the variety series Her Secret Weapon. The show focused on lesser-known girl group members and ranked them based on their performance in certain tasks that highlight the qualities female idols need to generate loyal fans. Out of ten contestants, Solbin tied with Berry Good's Taeha for sixth place.

On November 26, 2015, Laboum uploaded a music video teaser for the comeback single "Aalow Aalow" to the group's official YouTube channel. The video was released on December 1 and featured an elegant, yet funky retro style. On December 4, Laboum held a comeback stage for "Aalow Aalow" on Music Bank. The single album was officially released on December 6.

=== 2016–2017: Fresh Adventure, Love Sign, Miss This Kiss and Yulhee's departure ===
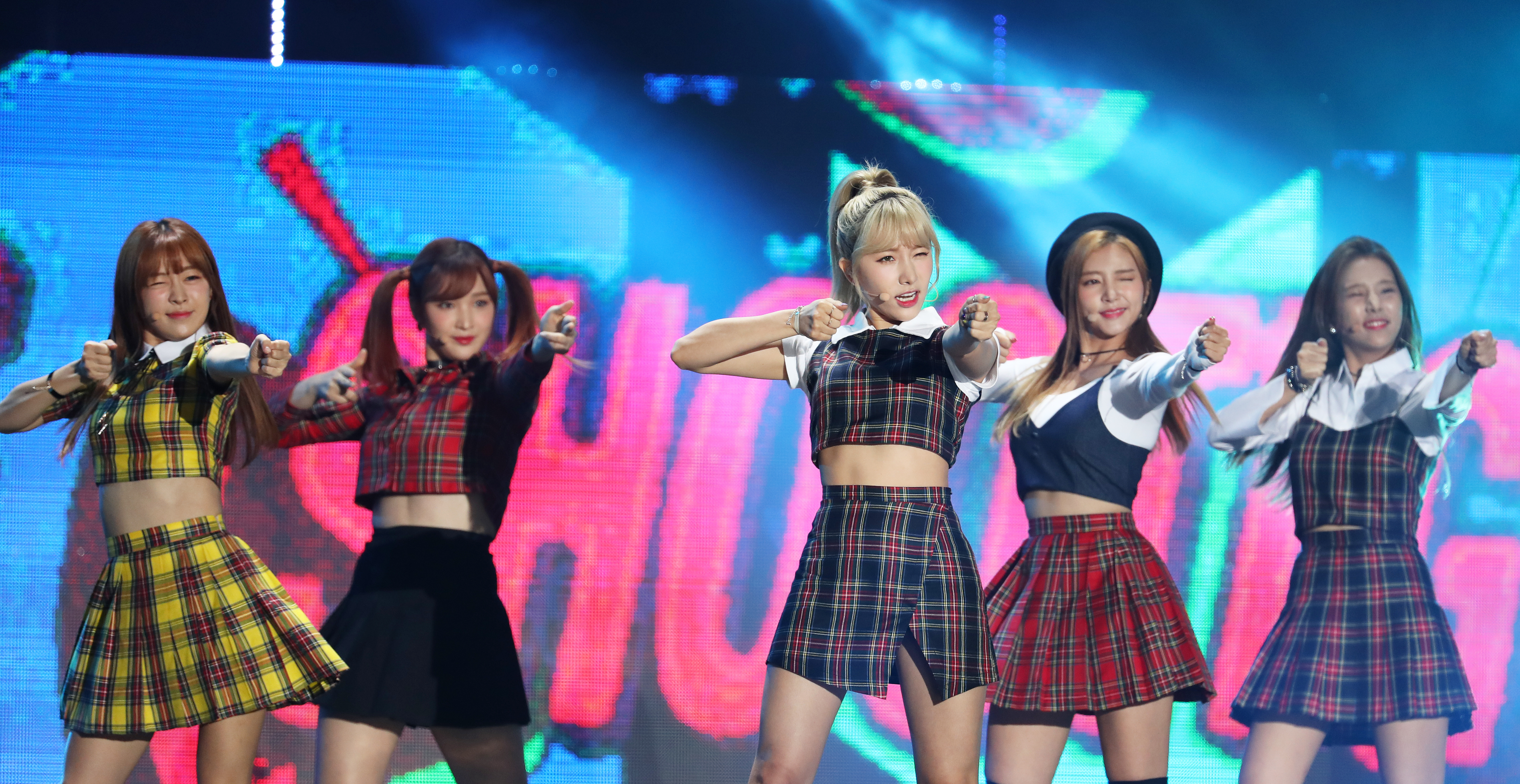
The group performing Shooting Love in 2016

On February 15, 2016, Laboum launched a campaign to fund their upcoming music video on the crowdfunding platform Makestar. Among other rewards, the group offered an "Honorary Producer" title in the music video credits to those who donated over a certain amount. The campaign reached its goal of $8,261 in just four hours.

The makestar campaign ultimately raised $27,832 – 336.9% of its original goal. Laboum released the music video for "Journey to Atlantis" and its accompanying fourth single album Fresh Adventure on April 6, 2016.

On August 23, 2016, Laboum's first mini album Love Sign was released. The album consists of six tracks, including the lead single "Shooting Love".

On December 2, 2016, Laboum released their winter digital single Winter Story.

On April 17, 2017, their second mini album Miss This Kiss was released with the lead track "Hwi Hwi". They took home their first music show win on Music Bank on April 28, 2017, with "Hwi Hwi". The album was crowdfunded on the platform Makestar; the campaign raised $75,751.58 – 849.93% over its original goal.

On July 25, 2017, Laboum released their summer digital single Laboum Summer Special with lead single "Only U".

ZN, Yujeong, and Haein appeared on KBS Idol Rebooting Project The Unit, which first aired on October 28, 2017.

On November 3, 2017, NH Media confirmed the departure of Yulhee from the group and terminated her contract.

=== 2018–2019: The Unit, Between Us, Japanese debut, I'm Yours, and Two of Us ===
On February 10, 2018, the finale for The Unit was held live at COEX Stadium, with ZN ranked #8. ZN promoted briefly as a member of the show's winning girl group, UNI.T. She was unable to take part in the group's second and final album, "Begin with the End" due to Laboum's conflicting schedules.

On July 9, a teaser image for the group's single album, Between Us was released. The following day, it was revealed that the single was produced by member Soyeon, and that all five members would participate in promotional activities.

The group released its debut Japanese single "Hwi Hwi" on November 7, 2018, under Nippon Columbia. The single reached No. 9 on the Oricon charts.

Laboum's sixth single album was released on December 5, 2018, with the lead single "Turn It On".

Laboum released their first studio album Two of Us with the title track "Firework" on September 19, 2019. The comeback was also backed by Makestar, achieving 529% of its original goal, and earning $43,283.28 from participants.

On December 21, Laboum came out with a rearranged version of their song 'Fresh Adventure' as 'Fresh Adventure Winter ++' for Christmas. This was the group's third digital single.

=== 2020–present: "Smile Pop Pop", sudden success with "Journey to Atlantis", Yujeong's departure, Blossom and group hiatus ===
Member Yujeong shared a teaser image on August 25, 2020, in an Instagram story that revealed a collaborative music video between Laboum and Chinese children's franchise BabyBus, for a song titled 'Smile Pop Pop'. On the same day, the song was released digitally.

On September 1, 2020, Laboum's company Global H Media confirmed that Laboum is scheduled to make a comeback with a mini-album in October 2020, but the comeback never materialized.

Two days after the announcement, on September 3, 2020, the music video for "Smile Pop Pop" got released through the 'SUPER SOUND Bugs' YouTube channel.

On December 24, 2020, Laboum released their fourth digital single "Cheese".

In March 2021, the 2016 song "Journey to Atlantis" was heavily featured in Hangout with Yoo, a Korean variety show program, causing the song to reappear on Korean music charts and steadily rose in position on several real-time charts. In response, the group resumed promotional activities for the song in June 2021. Following the success of "Journey to Atlantis", "Aalow Aalow" also peaked #163, six years after releasing.

On September 8, Yujeong posted a handwritten letter on Instagram, announcing that she was going to leave the group after her contract expired. She also announced that Soyeon, ZN, Solbin and Haein have renewed their contracts, and that Laboum would continue as a quartet. In addition, it was announced that the remaining members has departed from their current agency and signed with Interpark Music Plus, a subsidiary of Interpark.

On October 6, it was announced that Laboum would be making their comeback as a four-member group in early November. ZN will be using the name Jinyea for future activities moving forward. It was later announced that Laboum will be releasing their third EP Blossom on November 3.

On December 17, Laboum released the winter digital single "White Love", featuring Layone.

On March 10, 2022, it was confirmed that Laboum would release a new album in April 2022, though it never materialized.

In May 2022, Interpark Music Plus announced that Laboum would be attending the NO WAR Peace Concert', to be held on May 17, to inform the horrors of the Ukrainian war and to awaken the preciousness of peace. giving hope to many people suffering from war.

On August 11, 2022, it was speculated by news outlets that LABOUM would be disbanding at the end of August due to the recent acquisition of Interpark by Yanolja, as they had no intentions to continue managing the group. Later on the same day, a representative from Interpark Music Plus clarified that the group's disbandment has not been confirmed.

On September 23, Joynews24 reported that LABOUM would go on an indefinite hiatus to focus on individual activities. Even though the members are looking for new agencies, they are reportedly interested in conducting group activities as LABOUM alongside their individual activities.

According to Sports Khan, Haein signed a contract to be represented by the agency R&D Company.

On February 27, 2023, Jinyea signed an exclusive contract with Blade Entertainment.

On July 24, 2026, it was announced that Haein has signed a contract with Lean Branding.

== Members ==
=== Current ===
- Yujeong (유정)
- Soyeon (소연)
- Jinyea (진예)
- Haein (해인)
- Solbin (솔빈)

=== Former ===
- Yulhee (율희)

== Discography ==
=== Studio albums ===
Title	Album details	Peak chart positions		Sales
Title	Album details	KOR	JPN	Sales
Love Pop Wow	Released: April 24, 2019 (JPN); Re-released (Love Pop Wow!! (Type-B)): November 27, 2019 (JPN); Label: Nippon Columbia; Formats: CD, digital download; Track listing (Type-A): 1. Love Is The Magic; 2. BowWow!!; 3. My Name Is...; 4. Between Us (Japanese Ver.); 5. Breathing; 6. Sugar Pop; 7. Shooting Love (Japanese Ver.); 8. Killer Killer Tune (Album Ver.); 9. Hwi Hwi Japanese Ver.; 10. Tell Me Love Me; 11. Fresh Adventure (Japanese Ver.); 12. Harukaze; (Type-B): 1. Love Me; 2. I Can't My Boy	—	58	JPN: 2,051
Two of Us	Released: September 19, 2019 (KOR); Label: Global H Media, NHN Bugs; Formats: CD, digital download; Track listing: 1. Intro; 2. Firework (불꽃놀이); 3. You're The Light (잡아줄게); 4. Satellite; 5. Stay There (이별 앞에서) (Yujeong solo); 6. Two of Us (Soyeon solo); 7. Actually, This is a Secret (사실 이 얘기는 비밀인데) (ZN solo); 8. Hush (Haein solo); 9. Diary (일기) (Solbin solo); 10. Firework (불꽃놀이) (Inst.)	27	—	KOR: 2,044

=== Extended plays ===
Title	Album details	Peak chart positions	Sales
Title	Album details	KOR	Sales
Love Sign	Released: August 23, 2016; Label: Global H Media, LOEN Entertainment; Formats: CD, digital download; Track listing: 1. "Shooting Star" (Intro); 2. "Shooting Love" (푱푱); 3. "Ding Dong" (딩동); 4. "Oops!" (달콤하게); 5. "Like U Love U" (두근두근) (Soyeon with Yun of Lunafly); 6. "Shooting Love" (푱푱) (Inst.)	13	KOR: 3,333
Miss This Kiss	Released: April 17, 2017; Label: Global H Media, Interpark, Windmill Entertainment; Formats: CD, digital download	1	KOR: 31,472
Blossom	Released: November 3, 2021; Label: Interpark Music Plus; Formats: CD, digital download	18	KOR: 6,292

=== Single albums ===
Title	Album details	Peak chart positions	Sales
Title	Album details	KOR	Sales
Petit Macaron	Released: August 28, 2014; Label: Global H Media, CJ E&M; Formats: CD, digital download; Track listing: 1. Pit-A-Pat (두근두근); 2. La li:Lalala (주문을 풀어); 3. What About You (어떡할래); 4. Pit-A-Pat (두근두근) (Inst.); 5. La li:Lalala (주문을 풀어) (Inst.); 6. What About You (어떡할래) (Inst.)	15	KOR: 2,376
Petit Macaron	Repackaged (Petit Macaron: Data Pack): November 3, 2014; Label: Global H Media, CJ E&M; Formats: CD, digital download; Track listing: 1. What About You (어떡할래); 2. Winter Party; 3. What About You (어떡할래) (Inst.); 4. Winter Party (Inst.)	25	KOR: 2,376
Sugar Sugar	Released: March 27, 2015; Label: Global H Media, CJ E&M; Formats: CD, digital download; Track listing: 1. Sugar Sugar; 2. R U Kiddin' Me (장난햅); 3. Fantasy; 4. Sugar Sugar (Inst.); 5. R U Kiddin' Me (장난햅) (Inst.); 6. Fantasy (Inst.)	17	KOR: 1,916
Aalow Aalow	Released: December 6, 2015; Label: Global H Media, CJ E&M; Formats: CD, digital download; Track listing: 1. Intro; 2. Aalow Aalow (아로아로); 3. Tasty; 4. Aalow Aalow (아로아로) (Inst.); 5. Tasty (Inst.)	26	KOR: 1,582
Fresh Adventure	Released: April 6, 2016; Label: Global H Media, Interpark, Windmill Entertainment; Formats: CD, digital download; Track listing: 1. Intro; 2. Journey to Atlantis (상상더하기); 3. 3 Strike Out; 4. Caterpillar; 5. Journey to Atlantis (상상더하기) (Inst.)	9	KOR: 2,622
Between Us	Released: July 27, 2018; Label: Global H Media, NHN Bugs; Formats: CD, digital download; Track listing: 1. Between Us (체온); 2. Love Game; 3. Between Us (체온) (Inst.)	17	KOR: 4,980
I'm Yours	Released: December 5, 2018; Label: Global H Media, NHN Bugs; Formats: CD, digital download; Track listing: 1. Turn It On (불을 켜); 2. Heal Song (흐르는 이 노래가 멈추고 나면); 3. Between Us (체온) (Original ver.)	22	KOR: 2,886

=== Singles ===
Title	Year	Peak chart positions			Sales (DL)	Album
Title	Year	KOR	KOR Hot	JPN	Sales (DL)	Album
"Pit-A-Pat" (두근두근)	2014	195	—N/a	—N/a	KOR: 5,801	Petit Macaron
"What About You" (어떡할래)	2014	148	—N/a	—N/a	KOR: 10,723	Petit Macaron
"Sugar Sugar"	2015	271	—N/a	—N/a	KOR: 10,768	Sugar Sugar
"Aalow Aalow" (아로아로)	2015	163	—N/a	—N/a	KOR: 16,715	Aalow Aalow
"Journey to Atlantis" (상상더하기)	2016	10	12	—N/a	KOR: 32,491	Fresh Adventure
"Shooting Love" (푱푱)	2016	128	—N/a	—N/a	KOR: 31,420	Love Sign
"Winter Story" (겨울동화)	2016	—	—N/a	—N/a	—N/a	Non-album single
"Hwi Hwi" (휘휘) (Note: On November 7, 2018 "Hwi Hwi (Japanese ver.)" was released as Laboum's debut Japanese single.)	2017	— (Note: "Hwi Hwi" did not enter the Gaon Digital Chart, but appeared at number 99 on the component Download Chart.)	97	16	KOR: 18,137; JPN: 6,040 (Phy.)	Miss This Kiss
"Only U" (두바둡)	2017	—	—	—N/a	—N/a	Non-album single
"Between Us" (체온)	2018	— (Note: "Between Us" did not enter the Gaon Digital Chart, but appeared at number 82 on the component BGM Chart.)	—	—N/a	—N/a	Between Us
"Turn It On" (불을 켜)	2018	— (Note: "Turn It On" did not enter the Gaon Digital Chart, but appeared at number 81 on the component BGM Chart.)	—	—N/a	—N/a	I'm Yours
"Love Me"	2019	—	—	—N/a	—N/a	Love Pop Wow!!
"Firework" (불꽃놀이)	2019	—	—	—N/a	—N/a	Two of Us
"Winter++" (상상더하기)	2019	—	—	—N/a	—N/a	Non-album singles
"Cheese" (치즈)	2020	—	—	—N/a	—N/a	Non-album singles
"Kiss Kiss"	2021	— (Note: "Kiss Kiss" did not enter the Gaon Digital Chart, but appeared at number 32 on the component Download Chart.)	—	—N/a	—N/a	Blossom
"White Love" (스키장에서) (featuring Layone)	2021	— (Note: "White Love" did not enter the Gaon Digital Chart, but appeared at number 96 on the component Download Chart.)	86	—N/a	—N/a	Non-album single
"—" denotes a recording that did not chart or was not released in that territory.

=== Soundtrack appearances ===
Title	Year	Album
"Don't Look Back" (돌이키지 마)	2017	Immortal Songs: Singing the Legend (Lee Eun-ha)
"Oh My" (봄을 만나)	2019	Spring Turns to Spring OST Part.4

=== Collaborations ===
Title	Year	Album	Other Artist(s)
"Side by Side"	2019	Korea - ASEAN Summit `Growing With Art` Project	Sandeul, Killagramz, Cinta Laura Kiehl, Indigo, Darren Espanto, Wyne Lay, Alvin Chong, Vu Cat Tuong, OLABlack, Kelly Pan, Meas Sok Sophea
"Sangnoksu 2020" (부르는 상록수2020)	2020	Non-album singles	Bizzy, Kang San-ae, Johan Kim, Kim Feel, Na Yoon Kwon, Joy, Muzie, Young, JeA, Sandeul, Kyuhyun, Ryeowook, Yesung, Ali, Ailee, YooA, Oh Yeon Joon, Yoon Do-hyun, Solji, Lee Eun-mi, Tiger JK, TXT, Ha Dong-kyun, Hong Jin-young
"Smile POP POP" (스마일팝팝)	2020	Non-album singles	BABYBUS

== Videography ==
=== Music videos ===
Year	Song	Director(s)
Korean
2014	"Pit-A-Pat"	Yong Seong
2014	"What About You?"	Kim Beom-chul
2015	"Sugar Sugar"	No Jang-sik
2015	"Aalow Aalow"	INSP, SUIKO
2016	"Journey to Atlantis"	Hong Won-ki
2016	"Shooting Love"	Yoo Sung-kyun
2016	"Winter Story"	Yoo Sung-kyun
2017	"Hwi Hwi"	Yoo Sung-kyun
2017	"Dobadob (Only U)"	Yoo Sung-kyun
2018	"Between Us"	Yoo Sung-kyun
2018	"Turn It On"	Lee Hyun-jong
2019	"Firework"	—N/a
2019	"상상더하기 WINTER ++"	—N/a
2020	"Smile POP POP"	—N/a
2021	"Kiss Kiss"	—N/a
Japanese
2018	"Hwi Hwi"	Yoo Sung-kyun

== Ambassadorship ==
- Public Relations Ambassador Gangnam-gu (2021)

== Filmography ==
=== Television series ===
Year	Title	Network	Note
2016	The Sound of Your Heart	Naver TV Cast	Episode 6, as themselves, the new neighbours at No.205
2020	Backstreet Rookie	SBS	Solbin as Jung Eun-byul

=== Variety shows ===
Year	Title	Network	Note
2016	Laboum TV	Naver V App	
2017	Battle K Food(K-Rush)	KBS World TV	Yujeong and Soyeon

==== Reality show ====
Year	Title	Network
2016	Laboum project	MBC Music

== Awards and nominations ==
Name of the award ceremony, year presented, category, nominee of the award, and the result of the nomination
Award ceremony	Year	Category	Nominee / work	Result	Ref.
Asia Artist Awards	2016	Popularity Award – Singer	Laboum	Nominated	
Asia Artist Awards	2017	Popularity Award – Singer	Laboum	Nominated	
Asia Artist Awards	2018	Popularity Award – Singer	Laboum	Nominated	
Asia Model Awards	2021	Rising Star	Laboum	Won	
Korea Culture and Entertainment Awards	2018	K-Pop Star Award	Laboum	Won	
Korea Culture and Entertainment Awards	2021	K-Pop Star Award	Laboum	Won	
Korea Performing Arts Awards	2021	Best Girl Group	Laboum	Won	
Seoul Music Awards	2015	Bonsang Award	Laboum	Nominated	
Seoul Music Awards	2015	New Artist Award	Laboum	Nominated	
Seoul Music Awards	2015	Popularity Award	Laboum	Nominated	
Seoul Music Awards	2015	Hallyu Special Award	Laboum	Nominated	
