= Kim Ga-eun =

South Korean actress (born 1989)

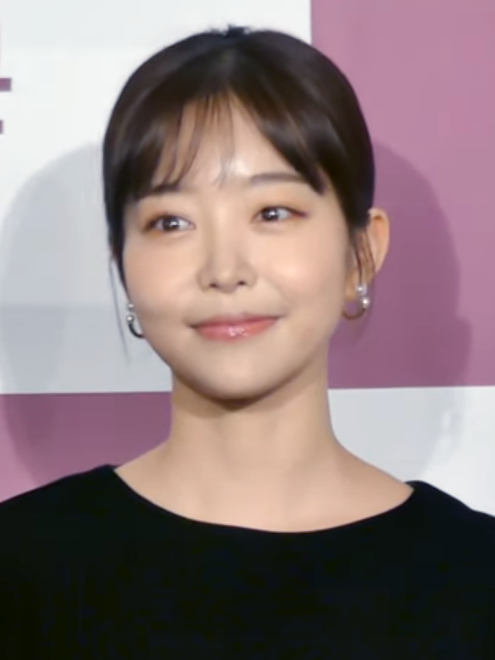
- Kim in February 2019
- Born: January 8, 1989 (age 37); Seoul, South Korea
- Education: Kookmin University - Theater and Film Studies
- Occupation: Actress
- Years active: 2009–present
- Agent: Popeye Entertainment
- Spouse: Yoon Sun-woo (m. 2025)

Korean name
- Hangul: 김가은
- Hanja: 金佳恩
- RR: Gim Gaeun
- MR: Kim Kaŭn

Kim Ga-eun (Korean: 김가은; born January 8, 1989) is a South Korean actress.

== Personal life ==
On July 1, 2025, it was reported that Kim would marry actor Yoon Sun-woo after 10 years of dating. The couple married on October 26, 2025, in Seoul. On October 25, 2026, Kim shared on her official social media account that she is expecting her first child.

== Filmography ==
=== Television series ===
Year	Title	Role	Ref.
2009	Style	Wang Mi-hye	
2010	Daring Women		
2010	Giant		
2010	You Don't Know Women		
2010	Dr. Champ	Pi Jung-ah	
2011	Scent of a Woman	Travel agent	
2011	Brain	Lee Ha-young	
2011	What's Up	Kim Ga-young	
2011	Kimchi Family	High school student single mother (cameo)	
2012	My Lover, Madame Butterfly	Kim Sal-goo	
2013	Jang Ok-jung, Living by Love	Hyang-yi	
2013	I Can Hear Your Voice	Go Sung-bin	
2014	Inspiring Generation	So-so	
2014	Gap-dong	High school student (cameo)	
2014	Gunman in Joseon	Im Je-mi	
2014	Vampire Flower	Seo-young	
2014	Single-minded Dandelion	Min Deul-re	
2015	I Order You	Park Song-ah	
2015	Songgot: The Piercer	Moon So-jin	
2016	The Royal Gambler	Gye Sul-im	
2017	Reunited Worlds	Sung Young-in	
2017	Because This Is My First Life	Yang Ho-rang	
2018	I Picked Up a Celebrity on the Street	Lee Yeon-seo	
2019	The Light in Your Eyes	Oh Hyun-joo	
2019	The Wind Blows	Son Ye-rim	
2021	On the Verge of Insanity	Seo Na-ri	
2022	Under the Queen's Umbrella	Royal Consort So-yong Tae	
2023	King the Land	Kang Da-eul	
2025	The Potato Lab	Lee Ong-ju	

=== Web series ===
Year	Title	Role	Ref.
2018	YG Future Strategy Office	Herself	
2022	Kiss Sixth Sense	Ban Ho-woo	

=== Film ===
Year	Title	Role	Notes	Ref.
2012	New Employee		Short film	
2021	My Big Mama's Crazy Ride	Choi Eun-seo		

== Awards and nominations ==
Year	Award	Category	Nominated work	Result
2013	6th Korea Drama Awards	Best New Actress	I Can Hear Your Voice	Nominated
2014	7th Korea Drama Awards	Best New Actress	I Can Hear Your Voice	Nominated
2014	KBS Drama Awards	Excellence Award, Actress in a Daily Drama	Single-minded Dandelion	Nominated
2014	KBS Drama Awards	Best New Actress	Single-minded Dandelion, Gunman in Joseon	Nominated
2021	MBC Drama Awards	Excellence Award, Actress in a Miniseries	On the Verge of Insanity	Nominated
