= On the Verge of Insanity =

2021 South Korean television series

- Promotional poster
- Hangul: 미치지 않고서야
- Lit.: No One but a Madman
- RR: Michiji ankoseoya
- MR: Mich'iji ank'osŏya
- Genre: Comedy; Workplace
- Created by: Kim Ho-jun
- Written by: Jung Do-yoon
- Directed by: Choi Jung-in
- Starring: Jung Jae-young; Moon So-ri; Lee Sang-yeob; Kim Ga-eun
- Composer: Park Se-joon
- Country of origin: South Korea
- Original language: Korean
- No. of episodes: 16

Production
- Producers: Kim Jong-sik; Kim Chang-mi
- Running time: 70 minutes
- Production company: IWill Media

Original release
- Network: MBC TV
- Release: June 23 – August 26, 2021

On the Verge of Insanity (Korean: 미치지 않고서야) is a 2021 South Korean television series starring Jung Jae-young, Moon So-ri, Lee Sang-yeob and Kim Ga-eun. It aired on MBC TV from June 23 to August 26, 2021 for 16 episodes.

== Synopsis ==
It follows the story of middle-aged office workers struggling to survive in a turbulent workplace.

== Cast ==
=== Main ===
- Jung Jae-young as Choi Ban-seok, a developer in the home appliance division of Hanmyung Electronics. Although he is a veteran engineer, he ends up joining the HR team after a series of ups and downs.
- Moon So-ri as Dang Ja-young, the workaholic head of HR team who is respected by her juniors for her outstanding leadership and is trusted by her superiors for her mental agility.
- Lee Sang-yeob as Han Se-kwon, the development team leader who is related to the company group's owner.
- Kim Ga-eun as Seo Na-ri, the deputy of the planning team.

=== Supporting ===
==== People in research building ====
- Kim Nam-hee as Shin Han-soo
- Ahn Nae-sang as Noh Byung-guk
- Park Sung-geun as Gong Jung-pil
- Park Won-sang as Peng Su-gon
- Dong Hyun-bae as Ki Jung-hyun
- Baek Min-hyun as Ahn Jun-soo
- Kim Joong-ki as Go Jung-sik
- Oh Yong as Pyun Dong-il

==== People in office building ====
- Cha Chung-hwa as Kim Jung-ah
- Im Hyun-soo as So Sang-wook
- Cheon Hee-joo as Gye Bo-ram
- Kim Jin-ho as Bae Jung-tak
- Lim Il-gyu as Oh Jae-il

==== People in headquarters ====
- Jo Bok-rae as Han Seung-gi
- Kang Ju-sang as Noh Jae-yeol
- Kang Yeon-woo as Park Hoon-jung

=== Extended ===
- Jung Sung-hoon as Yoon Gi-joon
- Kim Yoon-seo as Jung Sung-eun
- Kim Ye-eun as Oh Hye-yeon
- Jung Yeo-jun as Gil Chang-hwan
- Yoo Jung-rae as Eo Hae-mi
- Kim Seon-ah as Kim Seul-ah
- Oh Yu-na as Heo Ga-young

== Production ==
The first script reading of the cast was held at Changwon International Hotel. The series is set in South Gyeongsang Province and cast a large number of locals from that area in minor roles.
