= Jang Eui-soo =

South Korean actor and model

- 장의수
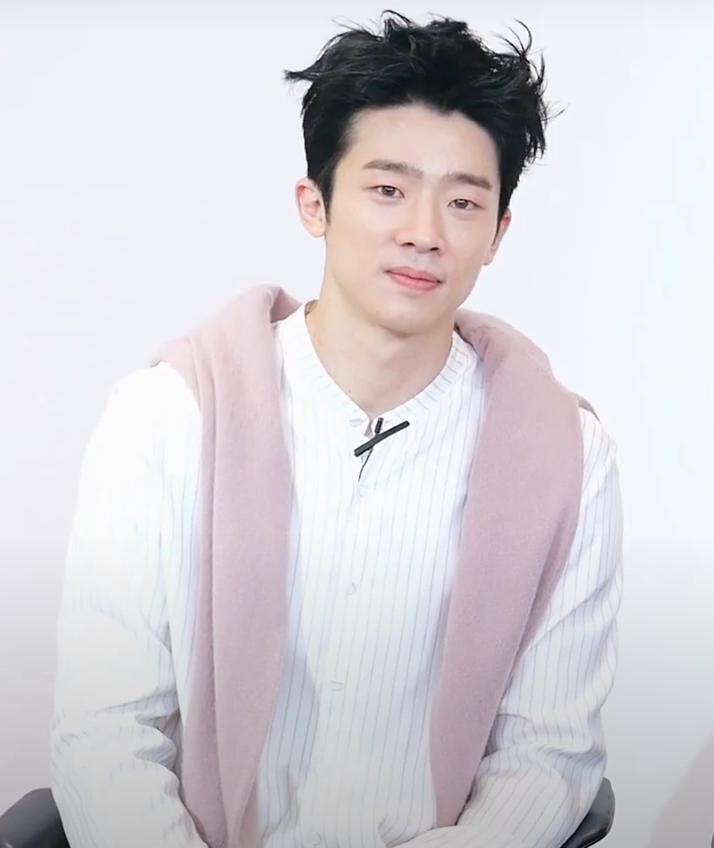
- Jang in September 2020
- Born: January 22, 1990 (age 36); Seoul, South Korea
- Education: Kyungmoon College
- Occupations: Model; actor
- Years active: 2008–present
- Agent: Elrise Entertainment
- Height: 1.86 m (6 ft 1 in)

Korean name
- Hangul: 장의수
- Hanja: 張懿洙
- RR: Jang Uisu
- MR: Chang Ŭisu

Jang Eui-soo (Korean: 장의수, born January 22, 1990) is a South Korean model and actor. He gained widespread popularity after starring in the BL drama Where Your Eyes Linger (2020).

== Early life and education ==
Jang Eui-soo was born on January 22, 1990, in Seoul, South Korea. He studied in Department of Model Acting at Kyungmoon College.

== Career ==
Jang began his career as a model in 2008. He has attracted attention by working on various runways that had been walked on. Since then, he has made his face known to the public through various advertisements and music videos. Then he was discovered by the agent and signed with Elrise Entertainment (이엘 라이즈).

Jang made his acting debut in 2012, appearing in the drama series A Gentleman's Dignity. He followed up with his movie bow, in the 2015 film Northern Limit Line. He then starred in the film The Beauty Inside where he played one of Woo Jin's transformations. He was modeled for the Seoul Fashion Week (서울 패션 위크) in 2015, as well as for the SS14 Seoul Fashion Week. He has also participated in photo shoots for BNT International in March, 2015.

In 2018, he played supporting role as a martial arts fighter in hit dramas Bad Papa. In 2019, he starred in the fantasy rom-com drama He Is Psychometric where he played a young investigator. In the same year, he played his first leading role in the romance drama Jal Pa Gin Love.

== Discography ==
=== Singles ===
==== As lead artist ====
Year	Song title	Album
2021	"안녕 나야" (Hello Baby)	My Sweet Dear OST Part 2

== Filmography ==
=== Television series ===
Year	Title	Role	Notes	Ref.
2012	A Gentleman's Dignity			
2018	Dokgo Rewind			
2018	Bad Papa	Sang Cheol		
2019	He Is Psychometric	Lee Seung-yong		
2019	Jal Pa Gin Love	Shi Ran-ho	Main role	
2020	Memorist	Park Sung-beom		
2020	Where Your Eyes Linger	Kang-gook	Main role	
2020	Kiss Goblin	Exorcist		
2020	Mr. Heart	University track team member		
2020	Tell Me You've Changed	Seok-jin	Main role	
2021	Oh My LadyLord	Park Gun-ho	Support role	
2021	Scripting Your Destiny	Kim Cheol-su	Episode 8, Episode 9	
2021	Nobleman Ryu's Wedding	Kim Tae-hyung		
2021	Next Door Witch J	Lee Tae-kyung		
2021	My Sweet Dear	Choi Jung-woo	Main role	
2023	Bad Memory Eraser	Nam Jin		

=== Film ===
Year	Title	Role	Notes	Ref.
2015	Northern Limit Line	Kim Myeon-soo		
2015	The Beauty Inside	Woo-jin #106	Minor role	
2020	Some Relationship			
2020	Dragon Inn Part 1: The City of Sadness	Seung-jin		
2021	The Dragon Inn Part 2: The Night of The Gods	Seung-jin		
