= Ahn Sol-bin =

South Korean singer and actress (born 1997)

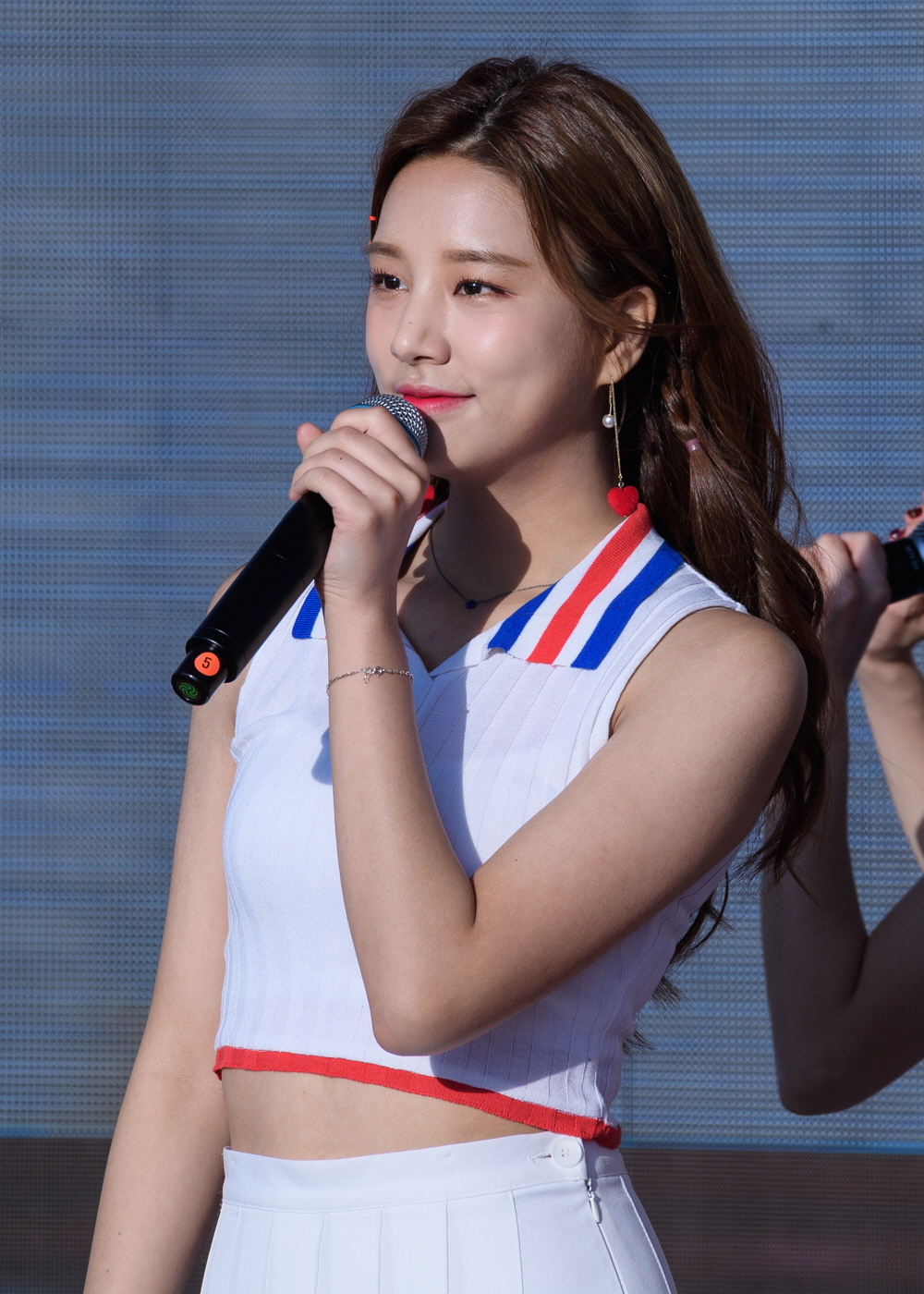
- Ahn in June 2017
- Born: August 19, 1997 (age 29); Seongnam, South Korea
- Education: Seoul Institute of the Arts
- Occupations: Singer; actress
- Musical career
- Genre: K-pop
- Instrument: Vocals
- Years active: 2014–present
- Labels: Global H; Interpark Music Plus
- Member of: Laboum

Korean name
- Hangul: 안솔빈
- Hanja: 安率濱
- RR: An Solbin
- MR: An Solbin

Ahn Sol-bin (Korean: 안솔빈; born August 19, 1997), known mononymously as Solbin, is a South Korean singer and actress. She was a member of the girl group Laboum.

== Filmography ==
=== Film ===
Year	Title	Role	Notes	Ref.
2016	Duel: Final Round	Jung-ran's colleague		
2018	Bling Bling Sounds	Lee Soo-ah		
2019	The Mistake of Survivorship Bias	Sung Ji-na		
2021	Only I Can See	Min Jung		

=== Television series ===
Year	Title	Role	Notes	Ref.
2016	The Sound of Your Heart	Herself		
2016	Solomon's Perjury	Lee Yoo-jin		
2017	Reunited Worlds	Nam Soon-ji		
2017	Meloholic	Kim Min-jung		
2018	Nice Witch	Bong Chun-ji		
2020	Touch	Song Ha-won	Cameo (Episode 2–3)	
2020	Itaewon Class	Sae Ro Yi's classmate	Cameo (Episode 1)	
2020	Backstreet Rookie	Jung Eun-byul		
2021	Oh My Ladylord	Kim Ji-yeon	Cameo (Episode 1–2)	
2021	Idol: The Coup	Hyun-ji		

=== Web series ===
Year	Title	Role	Notes	Ref.
2016	A Special Meal of the Weirdo, Nara	Na-ra		
2017	All the Love in the World 2	Min-yeong	Season 2	
2019	Soul Plate	Soopia		
2022	Brain, Your Choice of Romance	R	Season 2	

=== Television shows ===
Year	Title	Role	Notes	Ref.
2016–2018	Music Bank	Host	With Kang Min-hyuk (July 1, 2016 – November 4, 2016); With Lee Seo-won (November 11, 2016 – May 11, 2018)	
2022	Army Three	Host	with Jo Se-ho and Kwak Yoon-gy	

=== Web shows ===
Year	Title	Role	Notes	Ref.
2021–2022	Saturday Night Live Korea	Cast member	Season 2	

== Awards and nominations ==
Name of the award ceremony, year presented, category, nominee of the award, and the result of the nomination
Award ceremony	Year	Category	Nominee / Work	Result	Ref.
MBC Drama Awards	2021	Best New Actress	Oh My Ladylord	Nominated	
