= List of songs recorded by Lucy =

Here is a complete list of songs by the South Korean band Lucy.

== 0-9 ==
| Song | Artist(s) | Writer(s) | | | Album/Single | Language | Year | Ref. |
| Song | Artist(s) | Lyrics | Composition | Arrangement | Album/Single | Language | Year | Ref. |
|---|---|---|---|---|---|---|---|---|
| "10sec" | Lucy | Jo Won-sang | | Jo Won-sang; Choi Young-hoon | Childhood | Korean | 2022 | |

== A ==
| Song | Artist(s) | Writer(s) | | | Album/Single | Language | Year | Ref. |
| Song | Artist(s) | Lyrics | Composition | Arrangement | Album/Single | Language | Year | Ref. |
|---|---|---|---|---|---|---|---|---|
| "A New Chapter" (시작하는 너에게) | Lucy | Kim Ho-gyeong | 1601 | | Sorry Not Sorry OST Part 1 | Korean | 2024 | |
| "A Suspicious Medicine Chest" | Park Se-jun; Choi Sang-yeop | —N/a | Park Se-jun; Choi Sang-yeop | | Do Do Sol Sol La La Sol OST | —N/a | 2020 | |
| "A-YO" | Lucy | Zeenan; Lee Jeong-won | Zeenan; Lee Jeong-won +1; Dong6 | Zeenan; Lee Jeong-won | Undercover High School OST Part.4 | Korean | 2025 | |
| "Again!" (다시!) | Lucy | Jo Won-sang | Jo Won-sang; EUGENE; O.YEON; Choi Young-hoon | Jo Won-sang; EUGENE; O.YEON; Choi Young-hoon; Lee Jae-ho | Again! | Korean | 2026 | |
| "All Ages" (전체관람가) | Lucy | Jo Won-sang | Jo Won-sang; EUGENE; O.YEON; Choi Young-hoon | | Childish | Korean | 2026 | |
| "Ant, Go Run" | Lucy | Heo Sung-jin; Han Bam | Heo Sung-jin; Han Bam; D.Ori | Heo Sung-jin; D.Ori | Stock Struck OST Part.2 | Korean | 2022 | |
| "Anybody There" (누구 없소) | Kevin Oh; Kang Kyeong-yoon; Shin Gwang-il; Park Chan-young | Yoon Myeong-un | | Kevin Oh; Kang Kyeong-yoon; Shin Gwang-il; Park Chan-young | JTBC Superband Episode 6 | Korean | 2019 | |
| "As We Walk" (걷다보면) | Choi Sang-yeop | Choi Sang-yeop; Park Se-jun | | Choi Sang-yeop | My Strange Hero OST Part.8 | Korean | 2019 | |
| "Austin" | Choi Sang-yeop | —N/a | Choi sang-yeop | | Heroes Next Door OST SPECIAL | —N/a | 2025 | |

== B ==
| Song | Artist(s) | Writer(s) | | | Album/Single | Language | Year | Ref. |
| Song | Artist(s) | Lyrics | Composition | Arrangement | Album/Single | Language | Year | Ref. |
|---|---|---|---|---|---|---|---|---|
| "Baby, Baby" (애기애기해) | Choi Sang-yeop; Jo Eun-ae | Woo Ji-hun; Park Se-jun | | Woo ji-hun | My First First Love OST Part.1 | Korean | 2019 | |
| "blah-blah-blah" (구구절절) | Lucy | Shin Gwang-il | | Kang Butter | Childish | Korean | 2026 | |
| "bleu" | Lucy | Choi Sang-yeop | | | WAJANGCHANG | Korean | 2025 | |
| "bleu" | Lucy | Choi Sang-yeop | | | Childish | Korean | 2026 | |
| "Blue Voyage" | Lucy | XISO; SENJI | SSo; XISO; SENJI | Jo Won-sang; O.YEON; Choi Young-hoon | Trip:Tape #03 | Korean | 2022 | |
| "Boogie Man" | Lucy | Jo Won-sang | Jo Won-sang; EUGENE; Choi Young-hoon | Jo Won-sang; EUGENE; Choi Young-hoon; DINT | Boogie Man | Korean | 2023 | |
| "Brain, Your Choice of Romance" (뇌 맘대로 로맨스) | Choi Sang-yeop; Jo Eun-ae | Woo Ji-hun; Park Se-jun | | Woo Ji-hun | Brain, Your Choice of Romance OST | Korean | 2018 | |
| "Buddy" | Lucy | Jo Won-sang; Choi Sang-yeop; Isaac Hong | Jo Won-sang; O.YEON; Choi Young-hoon | Jo Won-sang; O.YEON; Choi Young-hoon; Park Ji-hwan | Gatcha! | Korean | 2021 | |
| "Burn It" (남김없이) | Lucy | Shin Gwang-il | Shin Gwang-il; Add Blessed | | FROM. | Korean | 2024 | |
| "Burnout Syndrome" | Park Se-jun; Choi Sang-yeop | —N/a | Park Se-jun; Choi Sang-yeop | | Do Do Sol Sol La La Sol OST | —N/a | 2020 | |

== C ==
| Song | Artist(s) | Writer(s) | | | Album/Single | Language | Year | Ref. |
| Song | Artist(s) | Lyrics | Composition | Arrangement | Album/Single | Language | Year | Ref. |
|---|---|---|---|---|---|---|---|---|
| "can i" | Choi Sang-yeop | | | | can i | Korean | 2019 | |
| "Chameleon" (카멜레온) | Lucy | Jo Won-sang | Jo Won-sang dohun EUGENE; O.YEON; Choi Young-hoon; Lee Jae-ho | Jo Won-sang dohun EUGENE; O.YEON; Choi Young-hoon | Childish | Korean | 2026 | |
| "Cheer Up" (잘하고있어) | Choi Sang-yeop | Park Se-jun; Woo Ji-hun | | Woo Ji-hun | Welcome to Waikiki OST Part.3 | Korean | 2018 | |
| "Colorless" (무색(無色)) | Lucy | Choi Sang-yeop | | | Childhood | Korean | 2022 | |
| "Comfort to You Who Miss the Past" (과거를 그리워하는 당신에게 위로를) | Choi Sang-yeop | | | | YEOP x 2 | Korean | 2017 | |
| "Complex" (못난이) | Lucy | Jo Won-sang | Jo Won-sang; O.YEON; Choi Young-hoon; EUGENE | | FROM. | Korean | 2024 | |
| "Crazy Weather" (날씨가 미쳤어) | Lucy | 20 Years of Age | | Lee Seung-ju | Crazy Weather (Our Pie X LUCY) | Korean | 2024 | |
| "Cry Bird" (Note: Recorded during JTBC Superband era, before Choi Sang-yeop joined Lucy.) | Lucy | Tennyson | | Lee Ju-hyuk; Shin Gwang-il; Shin Ye-chan; Jo Won-sang | JTBC Superband Episode 12 | Korean | 2019 | |

== D ==
| Song | Artist(s) | Writer(s) | | | Album/Single | Language | Year | Ref. |
| Song | Artist(s) | Lyrics | Composition | Arrangement | Album/Single | Language | Year | Ref. |
|---|---|---|---|---|---|---|---|---|
| "Days of Our Past" (지난 날) | Shin Ye-chan; Lim Keun-joo; Nam Keun-hyung; Kim Woo-tak | Yoo Jae-ha | | Shin Ye-chan; Lim Keun-joo; Nam Keun-hyung; Kim Woo-tak | JTBC Superband Episode 7 | Korean | 2019 | |
| "Daylight" | Lucy | Park Tae-jin | Kim Hyun-ah; Park Tae-jin | Park Tae-jin | Parole Examiner Lee OST Part 1 | Korean | 2024 | |
| "DIAMOND" (눈이 부신다) | Lucy | Jeon Jun-gyu; Zeenan | Jeon Jun-gyu; Zeenan; Upvote Entertainment | Jeon Jun-gyu; Zeenan | Gaus Electronics OST Part 1 | Korean | 2022 | |
| "Doggaebi Dance" (도깨비춤) | Lucy | Jo Won-sang | Jo Won-sang; EUGENE; O.EYON; Choi Young-hoon | | FROM. | Korean | 2024 | |
| "Domino (Feat.D-Hack (디핵))" | Lucy | Jo Won-sang; D-Hack; Eunsong | | Jo Won-sang; Eunsong; Seo Ye-eun | Childhood | Korean | 2022 | |
| "Don't forget our night" (이 밤을 잊지 말아요) | Lucy | Shin Gwang-il | Shin Gwang-il; Ahn so hyun | | Childhood | Korean | 2022 | |
| "Don't look at me like that" (너무 그렇게 보지 마) | Jo Won-sang | | Jo Won-sang; O.YEON | Jo Won-sang; O.YEON; Shin Ye-chan | MUMMOO : DOGGY LOG | Korean | 2020 | |
| "Dream" (꿈) | Lucy | Shin Ye-chan | | Shin Ye-chan; Choi Sang-yeop | BLUE | Korean | 2021 | |

== E ==
| Song | Artist(s) | Writer(s) | | | Album/Single | Language | Year | Ref. |
| Song | Artist(s) | Lyrics | Composition | Arrangement | Album/Single | Language | Year | Ref. |
|---|---|---|---|---|---|---|---|---|
| "Echoes of You" (메아리) | Lucy | Red Socks; INAN | | | IDOL I OST Part.1 | 2025 | Korean | |
| "Eclipse" (해가뜨는밤) | Lucy | Choi Sang-yeop | | | BLUE | 2021 | Korean | |
| EIO | Lucy | Jo Won-sang dohun | Jo Won-sang; EUGENE; Choi Young-hoon; O.YEON dohun Lee Jae-ho | | Sunflower | 2025 | Korean | |
| EIO (Childish ver.) | Lucy | Jo Won-sang dohun | Jo Won-sang; EUGENE; Choi Young-hoon; O.YEON dohun Lee Jae-ho | | Childish | 2026 | Korean | |
| "Ending" | Lucy | Jo Won-sang; Eunsong | Jo Won-sang; O.YEON; Choi Young-hoon | | Childhood | 2022 | Korean | |
| "Enough" (충분히) | Lucy | Shin Gwang-il | | Jo Won-sang; O.YEON | PANORAMA | 2020 | Korean | |
| "Expression of Love (Our Secret Diary X LUCY)" (애정표현 (말하고 싶은 비밀 X LUCY)) | Lucy | Lee Sang-myeong | Go Sung-jin; Kim Woo-di | Jung Su-min | Expression of Love (Our Secret Diary X LUCY) | 2023 | Korean | |

== F ==
| Song | Artist(s) | Writer(s) | | | Album/Single | Language | Year | Ref. |
| Song | Artist(s) | Lyrics | Composition | Arrangement | Album/Single | Language | Year | Ref. |
|---|---|---|---|---|---|---|---|---|
| "Fake Blessings" | Choi Sang-yeop | Shin Seung-min | | | MapleStory M OST : Archon | Korean | 2024 | |
| "Falling Flower" (낙화) | Lucy | Jo Won-sang | Jo Won-sang; O.YEON; Choi Young-hoon | | FROM. | Korean | 2024 | |
| "Farther and Farther" | Lucy | Jo Won-sang; Choi Sang-yeop | Jo Won-sang; O.YEON; Shin Ye-chan | Jo Won-sang; O.YEON; Park Ji-hwan | Snooze | Korean | 2020 | |
| "Feel so good" | Lucy | Sim Kyu-tae; Jay Lee | | | Feel so good (Gongzza X LUCY) | Korean | 2022 | |
| "Fill it up" (채워) | Lucy | Jo Won-sang; Hwang Min-jae | Jo Won-sang; O.YEON; Choi Young-hoon | | INSERT COIN | Korean | 2023 | |
| "Firework" (불꽃놀이) | Lucy; Baek A | Jeong Gu-hyeon | | | Dear X Who Doesn't Love Me OST Part 4 | Korean | 2022 | |
| "First Love" (첫사랑) | Choi Sang-yeop | Woo Ji-hun; Park Se-jun | | Woo Ji-hun | My First First Love OST Part.1 | Korean | 2019 | |
| "First Love" (첫사랑) | Lucy | Jeon Hae-sung | | Lee Ki-hwan; CONA; Moon | First Love | Korean | 2025 | |
| "Flare" | Lucy | Jo Won-sang; Lee Ju-hyuk; Shin Gwang-il; Shin Ye-chan | | | JTBC Superband Episode 14 | Korean | 2019 | |
| "Flare" | Lucy | Jo Won-sang; Lee Ju-hyuk; Shin Gwang-il; Shin Ye-chan | | Jo Won-sang; Lee Ju-hyuk; Shin Gwang-il; Shin Ye-chan; O.YEON | PANORAMA | Korean | 2020 | |
| "Flowering" (개화) | Lucy | Jo Won-sang; Choi Sang-yeop | Jo Won-sang; O.YEON | Jo Won-sang; Shin Ye-chan; Choi Sang-yeop; Shin Gwang-il; O.YEON | DEAR. | Korean | 2020 | |
| "Fly High" (날아올라) | Lucy | Kim Su-bin; Blue Mangtto; Yoon Kyung-won; Lee Ju-heon | Kim Chang-rak; Jo Se-hee; Blue Mangtto; ATONE | Jo Se-hee; ATONE; JUNG.D; HYUNO | Moonshine OST Part.4 | Korean | 2022 | |
| "Foul" (파울)) | Lucy | Jo Won-sang | Jo Won-sang; Choi Young-hoon | Jo Won-sang; Choi Young-hoon; O.YEON | Childhood | Korean | 2022 | |

== G ==
| Song | Artist(s) | Writer(s) | | | Album/Single | Language | Year | Ref. |
| Song | Artist(s) | Lyrics | Composition | Arrangement | Album/Single | Language | Year | Ref. |
|---|---|---|---|---|---|---|---|---|
| "Give Me The Stars" (별을 내어줘) | Choi Sang-yeop | | | | Give Me The Stars | Korean | 2019 | |
| "GO" | Lucy | Jung Do-young; Jung Se-young; Mohan | | | High School Return of a Gangster OST Part.1 | Korean | 2024 | |
| "Grey" | Lucy | Moon Seong-nam | | | Bad Memory Eraser X LUCY | Korean | 2024 | |

== H ==
| Song | Artist(s) | Writer(s) | | | Album/Single | Language | Year | Ref. |
| Song | Artist(s) | Lyrics | Composition | Arrangement | Album/Single | Language | Year | Ref. |
|---|---|---|---|---|---|---|---|---|
| "HALLEY" | Lucy | Taibian | Taibian; Dr.Ba$$(1) | | Spirit Fingers OST Part.1 | Korean | 2025 | |
| "Hard to say I'm Sorry" | Zairo; Ji-sang; Shin Gwang-il; Lee Yong-hun | Peter Cetera; David Foster | | Zairo; Ji-sang; Shin Gwang-il; Lee Yong-hun | JTBC Superband Episode 3, 4 | English | 2019 | |
| "Haze" (아지랑이) | Lucy | Jo Won-sang; Eunsong | Jo Won-sang; O.YEON; Choi Young-hoon; Eunsong | Jo Won-sang; O.YEON; Choi Young-hoon; T-lack | Fever | Korean | 2023 | |
| "Hero" (히어로) | Lucy | Jo Won-sang; Choi Sang-yeop; Shin Ye-chan | Jo Won-sang; O.YEON | Jo Won-sang; Choi Sang-yeop; Shin Ye-chan; Shin Gwang-il; O.YEON | INSIDE | Korean | 2021 | |
| "Hey!" | Lucy | Kim Bum-ju; Kim Si-hyuk | | | Flex X Cop OST Part.1 | Korean | 2024 | |
| "HIGHLIGHT" | Lucy | YNR | Pe2ny; BBD; YNR | Pe2ny; BBD; XENO VIBE | GARBAGE TIME | Korean | 2025 | |
| "Hippo" (하마) | Lucy | Jo Won-sang | Jo Won-sang; EUGENE; O.YEON; Choi Young-hoon | | WAJANGCHANG | Korean | 2025 | |
| "Hippo (Childish ver.)" (하마 (Childish ver.)) | Lucy | Jo Won-sang | Jo Won-sang; EUGENE; O.YEON; Choi Young-hoon | | Childish | Korean | 2026 | |
| "Hold Back The River" | Lee Ju-hyuk; Shin Gwang-il; Shin Ye-chan | James Bay; Iain Archer | | Lee Ju-hyuk; Shin Gwang-il; Shin Ye-chan | JTBC Superband Episode 9 | English | 2026 | |
| "Hold My Hand" (내 손을 잡아) | Choi Sang-yeop | Choi Sang-yeop; Park Se-jun | | Choi Sang-yeop | Last Minute Romance OST | Korean | 2017 | |
| "Hometown" | Choi Sang-yeop | —N/a | Choi Sang-yeop | | Brewing Love OST | —N/a | 2024 | |
| "Hot" (뜨거) | Lucy | Jo Won-sang; Eunsong | Jo Won-sang; O.YEON; Choi Young-hoon; Eunsong | Jo Won-sang; O.YEON; Choi Young-hoon; T-lack | Fever | Korean | 2023 | |
| "Hug" (놓지 않을게) | Lucy | Shin Gwang-il | | | BLUE | Korean | 2021 | |

== I ==
| Song | Artist(s) | Writer(s) | | | Album/Single | Language | Year | Ref. |
| Song | Artist(s) | Lyrics | Composition | Arrangement | Album/Single | Language | Year | Ref. |
|---|---|---|---|---|---|---|---|---|
| "I don't wanna heart you" (서툴러서) | Lucy | Jo Won-sang | Jo Won-sang; O.YEON | | Zombie Detective OST Part.2 | Korean | 2020 | |
| "I Got U" | Lucy | Jo Won-sang; Choi Sang-yeop; Isaac Hong | Jo Won-sang; O.YEON; Choi Young-hoon | Jo Won-sang; Shin Ye-chan; Choi Sang-yeop; Shin Gwang-il; O.YEON; Choi Young-hoon; Park Ji-hwan | Gatcha! | Korean | 2021 | |
| "I Want to Fall in Love" (사랑에 빠지고 싶다) | Ken; Choi Sang-yeop | Choi Eun-ha | Yoon Il-sang | Melodesign | Duet Song Festival Episode 5 | Korean | 2016 | |
| "I Wonder (feat. Shin Ye-chan of LUCY)" (알고 싶은데 (feat. 신예찬 of LUCY)) | Kim Su-young; Shin Ye-chan | Kim Su-young | | Chaz; Kim Su-young | Antiguo Trunk | Korean | 2025 | |
| "I'll Dive Into You" (너에게 가고 있어) | Lucy | Kim Ki-tae; Kim Su-bin; Ahn Ji-su | Kim Su-bin; Jo Se-hee | | I'll Dive Into You (Villain with a Crush X LUCY) | Korean | 2025 | |
| "I'll Find You" (찾았다) | Lucy | Kim Ho-gyung | 1601 | | Snap and Spark OST Part.1 | Korean | 2023 | |
| "I'm Not This Kind of Person" (이런 사람 아닌데) | Choi Sang-yeop | | | Woo Ji-hun | I'm Not This Kind of Person | Korean | 2019 | |
| "In A Rush (Feat. Wonstein)" (다급해져 (Feat. 원슈타인)) | Lucy | Jo Won-sang dohun Wonstein | Jo Won-sang; O.YEON; Choi Young-hoon dohun EUGENE; Wonstein | Jo Won-sang; O.YEON; Choi Young-hoon dohun EUGENE | Sunflower | Korean | 2025 | |
| "In A Rush (Feat. Wonstein) (Childish ver.)" (다급해져 (Feat. 원슈타인) (Childish ver.)) | Lucy | Jo Won-sang dohun Wonstein | Jo Won-sang; O.YEON; Choi Young-hoon dohun EUGENE; Wonstein | Jo Won-sang; O.YEON; Choi Young-hoon dohun EUGENE | Childish | Korean | 2026 | |
| "In the dim light (Eng ver.)" | Choi Sang-yeop | Song I-na< | ONEO | | Pink Lie OST Part 2 | English | 2022 | |
| "In the Rain" (빗속에서) | Ken; Choi Sang-yeop | Lee Young-hun | | Melodesign | Duet Song Festival Episode 4 | Korean | 2016 | |
| "Into The Day" (동이 틀 때) | Lucy | Jo Won-sang; Eunsong | Jo Won-sang; O.YEON; Choi Young-hoon | | Into The Day | Korean | 2024 | |
| "Into your time" (너의 시간속으로) | Choi Sang-yeop | Park Se-jun; Woo Ji-hun | | Woo Ji-hun | Closer OST | Korean | 2017 | |
| "INTRO" | Lucy | —N/a | Jo Won-sang; O.YEON | Jo Won-sang; Shin Ye-chan; Choi Sang-yeop; Shin Gwang-il; O.YEON | DEAR. | Korean | 2020 | |
| "Irrelevant Answer" (동문서답) | Lucy | Jo Won-sang; Choi Sang-yeop | Jo Won-sang; O.YEON; Choi Young-hoon; Park Ji-hwan | Jo Won-sang; Shin Ye-chan; Choi Sang-yeop; Shin Gwang-il; O.YEON; Choi Young-hoon; Park Ji-hwan | Irrelevant Answer | Korean | 2021 | |

== J ==
| Song | Artist(s) | Writer(s) | | | Album/Single | Language | Year | Ref. |
| Song | Artist(s) | Lyrics | Composition | Arrangement | Album/Single | Language | Year | Ref. |
|---|---|---|---|---|---|---|---|---|
| "Jogging" (조깅) | Lucy | Jo Won-sang; Choi Sang-yeop; Shin Ye-chan; Shin Gwang-il | Jo Won-sang | Jo Won-sang; O.YEON; Park Ji-hwan | PANORAMA | Korean | 2020 | |
| "Just As I Am" (내 모습 이대로) | Choi Sang-yeop | | | | YEOP x 2 | Korean | 2017 | |

== K ==
| Song | Artist(s) | Writer(s) | | | Album/Single | Language | Year | Ref. |
| Song | Artist(s) | Lyrics | Composition | Arrangement | Album/Single | Language | Year | Ref. |
|---|---|---|---|---|---|---|---|---|
| "Knowhow" | Lucy | Jo Won-sang; Eunsong | Jo Won-sang; Choi Young-hoon; BYMORE | Jo Won-sang; Choi Young-hoon; BYMORE; Park Ji-hwan | Childhood | Korean | 2022 | |

== L ==
| Song | Artist(s) | Writer(s) | | | Album/Single | Language | Year | Ref. |
| Song | Artist(s) | Lyrics | Composition | Arrangement | Album/Single | Language | Year | Ref. |
|---|---|---|---|---|---|---|---|---|
| "Light UP" | Lucy | Nam Hye-seung; Janet Suhh | Nam Hye-seung; Jeon Jong-hyuk; Heo Seok; Lee Jae-woo | | Lord of Heroes OST Part 3 | Korean | 2022 | |
| "Like" (좋아) | Jo Eun-ae; Choi Sang-yeop | Woo Ji-hun; Park Se-jun | | Woo Ji-hun | Rebel Detectives 2 OST | Korean | 2018 | |
| "Lisianthus" (사랑한 영원) | Lucy | Shin Ye-chan | Shin Ye-chan; O.YEON | O.YEON; Shin Ye-chan; Park Ji-hwan | Sunflower | Korean | 2025 | |
| "Lisianthus" (사랑한 영원) | Lucy | Shin Ye-chan | Shin Ye-chan; O.YEON | O.YEON; Shin Ye-chan; Park Ji-hwan | Childish | Korean | 2026 | |
| "Little Star" (작은별) | Lucy | Nmore; Jozu; Jeon Jennie | | Nmore; Kim Seung-jun | Bad Prosecutor OST Part 2 | Korean | 2022 | |
| "Love is Here" | Lucy | Kim Yong; Oh Dong-jun | | | Romance by Romance OST Part 1 | Korean | 2023 | |
| "LOVE ME LOVE YOU" | Lucy; Lee Su-hyun | Kim Eana | Jo Won-sang | Jo Won-sang; Jung Hyun-woo; O.YEON | LOVE ME LOVE YOU | Korean | 2021 | |

== M ==
| Song | Artist(s) | Writer(s) | | | Album/Single | Language | Year | Ref. |
| Song | Artist(s) | Lyrics | Composition | Arrangement | Album/Single | Language | Year | Ref. |
|---|---|---|---|---|---|---|---|---|
| "Magic" | Lucy | Shin Gwang-il | Shin Gwang-il; Add Blessed | | Fever | Korean | 2023 | |
| "Missing Call (Feat. SURAN (수란)" | Lucy | Jo Won-sang; Choi Sang-yeop | Jo Won-sang | Jo Won-sang; O.YEON; Park Ji-hwan | PANORAMA | Korean | 2020 | |
| "Mother And Mackerel" (어머니와 고등어) | Lucy | Kim Chang-wan | | Oh Seung-eun | Monthly The Stage | Korean | 2023 | |
| "MP3" | Lucy | Jo Won-sang; Eunsong | Jo Won-sang; Eunsong; Seo Ye-eun | Jo Won-sang; O.YEON; Choi Young-hoon | Childhood | Korean | 2022 | |
| "My Face Is Burning" (화끈화끈해) | Choi Sang-yeop | Han Jun; Park Se-jun | Park Se-jun; Woo Ji-hun | | Beautiful Gong Shim OST Part.3 | Korean | 2016 | |
| "My warm loneliness" (내 쓸쓸함은 차갑지 않아요) | Lucy | Shin Ye-chan | | Choi Sang-yeop; Choi Young-hoon; Shin Ye-chan | Childhood | Korean | 2022 | |

== N ==
| Song | Artist(s) | Writer(s) | | | Album/Single | Language | Year | Ref. |
| Song | Artist(s) | Lyrics | Composition | Arrangement | Album/Single | Language | Year | Ref. |
|---|---|---|---|---|---|---|---|---|
| "Never Ending Story" | Ken; Choi Sang-yeop | Kim Tae-won | | Melodesign | Duet Song Festival Episode 3 | Korean | 2016 | |
| "Never in vain" | Lucy | Jo Won-sang; Isaac Hong; Hwang Min-jae; Shin Seo-hyun | Jo Won-sang; Add Blessed | | INSERT COIN | Korean | 2023 | |
| "Nice to meet you" (잘 부탁드립니다) | Choi Sang-yeop | Ex; Expression | | Jang Ji-won; Choi Il-ho | Into My Playlist Part.01 | Korean | 2023 | |

== O ==
| Song | Artist(s) | Writer(s) | | | Album/Single | Language | Year | Ref. |
| Song | Artist(s) | Lyrics | Composition | Arrangement | Album/Single | Language | Year | Ref. |
|---|---|---|---|---|---|---|---|---|
| "Oh-eh" | Daybreak; Lucy | Jo Won-sang | Lee Won-seok | Jo Won-sang; O.YEON; Choi Young-hoon | Daybreak X LUCY : Part.2 | Korean | 2022 | |
| "Old Song" (오래된 노래) | Ken; Youngjae; Hui; Choi Sang-yeop | Egg1; Egg2; Egg3 | | Lee Do-hyeong; Pyeon Jun-won; Jung Su-wan | Old Song | Korean | 2025 | |
| "One by One" | Lucy | Jo Won-sang; Choi Sang-yeop; Isaac Hong | Jo Won-sang; O.YEON; Choi Young-hoon | Jo Won-sang; O.YEON; Choi Young-hoon; Park Ji-hwan | Gatcha! | Korean | 2021 | |
| "Opening" | Lucy | Jo Won-sang; Eunsong | Jo Won-sang; O.YEON; Choi Young-hoon | | Childhood | Korean | 2022 | |
| "Over The Christmas" | Lucy | Jo Won-sang | Jo Won-sang; O.YEON; Choi Young-hoon | Jo Won-sang; O.YEON; Choi Young-hoon; EUGENE | Boogie Man | Korean | 2023 | |
| "OUTRO" (뒤 돌아보면) | Lucy | —N/a | Jo Won-sang; O.YEON | | INSIDE | Korean | 2021 | |
| "Outsider" (뚝딱) | Lucy | Jo Won-sang | Jo Won-sang; EUGENE; O.YEON; Choi Young-hoon dohun | | WAJANGCHANG | Korean | 2025 | |
| "Outsider (Childish ver.)" (뚝딱 (Childish ver.)) | Lucy | Jo Won-sang | Jo Won-sang; EUGENE; O.YEON; Choi Young-hoon dohun | | Childish | Korean | 2026 | |

== P ==
| Song | Artist(s) | Writer(s) | | | Album/Single | Language | Year | Ref. |
| Song | Artist(s) | Lyrics | Composition | Arrangement | Album/Single | Language | Year | Ref. |
|---|---|---|---|---|---|---|---|---|
| "Pathetic Love" (내가 더) | Lucy | Jo Won-sang | Jo Won-sabf; EUGENE; O.YEON; Choi Young-hoon | | WAJANGCHANG | Korean | 2025 | |
| "Pathetic Love (Childish ver.)" (내가 더 (Childish ver.)) | Lucy | Jo Won-sang | Jo Won-sabf; EUGENE; O.YEON; Choi Young-hoon | | Childish | Korean | 2026 | |
| "Play" (놀이) | Lucy | Jo Won-sang; Eunsong | Jo Won-sang | Jo Won-sang; O.YEON; Choi Young-hoon | Childhood | Korean | 2022 | |
| "Police Class" | Lucy | Nam Hye-seung; Park Jin-ho | Nam Hye-seung; Park Jin-ho; Heo Seok | Heo Seok; Jeon Jong-hyuk; Lee Jae-woo | Rookie Cops OST Part.2 | Korean | 2022 | |
| "Proch Light (Feat. Skyelar (남제현))" | Lucy | Jo Won-sang; Skyelar | Jo Won-sang; DINT; EUGENE; Choi Young-hoon; Lee Jae-ho | Jo Won-sang; EUGENE; Choi Young-hoon; Lee Jae-ho | Childish | Korean | 2026 | |
| "Prequel" (이미 다 알고 있었지만) | Lucy | Jo Won-sang; Eunsong | Jo Won-sang; Eunsong; Seo Ye-eun | Jo Won-sang; O.YEON; Choi Young-hoon; BYMORE | Childhood | Korean | 2022 | |

== R ==
| Song | Artist(s) | Writer(s) | | | Album/Single | Language | Year | Ref. |
| Song | Artist(s) | Lyrics | Composition | Arrangement | Album/Single | Language | Year | Ref. |
|---|---|---|---|---|---|---|---|---|
| "Ready, Get Set, Go!" | Lucy | Peppertones | | Jo Won-sang; O.YEON; Choi Young-hoon | Twenty Plenty | Korean | 2024 | |
| "Rolling Rolling" (떼굴떼굴) | Lucy | Jo Won-sang | Jo Won-sang; Choi Young-hoon; O.YEON | Jo Won-sang; Choi Young-hoon; O.YEON; Park Ji-hwan | BLUE | Korean | 2021 | |
| "Run Away" (항상 엔진을 켜둘께) | Lucy | Kim Min-gyu; Kim Dong-young | Kim Min-gyu | Choi Sang-yeop | Run Away | Korean | 2022 | |
| "Run To You" | Lucy | Choi Gap-won; Good Choice | Park Bo-jeong; Kim Seung-min; Kim Si-won; Hwang Chan-hee | Kim Seung-min; Kim Si-won | Run To You (Run On OST Part.1) | Korean | 2020 | |

== S ==
| Song | Artist(s) | Writer(s) | | | Album/Single | Language | Year | Ref. |
| Song | Artist(s) | Lyrics | Composition | Arrangement | Album/Single | Language | Year | Ref. |
|---|---|---|---|---|---|---|---|---|
| "Saudade" (아마 괜찮을 너에게) | Lucy | Jo Won-sang | Jo Won-sang; EUGENE; O.YEON; Choi Young-hoon | | Again! | Korean | 2026 | |
| "Sequel" (결국 아무것도 알 수 없었지만) | Lucy | Jo Won-sang; Seo Jeong-ah | Jo Won-sang; Choi Young-hoon; O.YEON | Jo Won-sang; Choi Young-hoon; O.YEON; Park Ji-hwan | BLUE | Korean | 2021 | |
| "She's Smiling" (그녀가 웃잖아) | Lucy | Jo Eun-hee | Hwang Se-jun | Han Bam | She's Smiling | Korean | 2024 | |
| "Shine A Light" | Lucy | Chealee | Dvii; SNNJ | Ryo Ito; SNNJ | My Dearest Nemesis OST Part.2 | Korean | 2025 | |
| "Snooze" (선잠) | Lucy | Jo Won-sang; Lee Ju-hyuk; Shin Gwang-il; Shin Ye-chan | | | JTBC Superband Episode 13 | Korean | 2019 | |
| "Snooze" (선잠) | Lucy | Jo Won-sang; Lee Ju-hyuk; Shin Gwang-il; Shin Ye-chan | | Jo Won-sang; Lee Ju-hyuk; Shin Gwang-il; Shin Ye-chan; O.YEON; Park Ji-hwan | Snooze | Korean | 2020 | |
| "So Nice (GMF2022 Ver.) Feat. LUCY, Hoseung(SURL), Yudabin(YdBB), Yoon Min(Touched), Jang Gyeong-min(Lacuna), ARO" (So Nice (GMF2022 Ver.) Feat. LUCY, 설호승(SURL), 유다빈(유다빈밴드), 윤민(터치드), 장경민(Lacuna), 정아로) | Grand Mint Band (GMB) | Lee Won-seok | Kim Jang-won; Kim Seon-il | Kwon Hyeok-ho; Jeong Dong-hwan | So Nice (GMF2022 Ver.) | Korean | 2022 | |
| "So Nice (GMF Theme Song)" | Lucy | Lee Won-seok | Kim Jang-won; Kim Seon-il | Choi Sang-yeop | So Nice (GMF Theme Song) | Korean | 2024 | |
| "So What" (내버려) | Lucy | Jo Won-sang; Eunsong | Jo Won-sang; O.YEON; Choi Young-hoon | Jo Won-sang; O.YEON; Choi Young-hoon; T-lack | Fever | Korean | 2023 | |
| "Some" (썸썸) | Choi Sang-yeop; Jo Eun-ae | Woo Ji-hun | | | Brain, Your Choice of Romance Season 2 OST | Korean | 2022 | |
| "Some Day in the 21century" (21세기의 어떤 날) | Lucy | Shin Jae-pyeong | | Jo Won-sang; Choi Young-hoon; O.YEON | Some Day in the 21century | Korean | 2022 | |
| "Spring Again" (또 다시 봄) | Choi Sang-yeop | | | | Spring Again | Korean | 2018 | |
| "Sprout" (발아) | Lucy | Jo Won-sang | Jo Won-sang; EUGENE; O.YEON dohun Choi Young-hoon; DINT | | Childish | Korean | 2026 | |
| "Starlight" | Lucy | Jang Jae-in | PERCENT | | We Are All Trying Here OST Part.2 | Korean | 2026 | |
| "Stay" | Lucy | Jay Lee | | | A Love Other Than Yours OST Part.2 | Korean | 2026 | |
| "STILL AT THE PARTY (Feat. Shin Ye-chan (신예찬) of LUCY)" | Q the trumpet Shin Ye-chan | Q the trumpet | Q the trumpet Go Seo-won | Q the trumpet Go Seo-won; O.YEON | WHEN I LOVE♥ | English | 2025 | |
| "Still Fighting" | Lucy | Lee Ki-hwan; Moon | | Lee Ki-hwan; CONA; Moon | Miraculous Brothers OST Part.5 | Korean | 2023 | |
| "Still in you (Kor ver.)" | Shin Gwang-il; Haram | Lee Ki-hwan; Lee Do-hyeong | Lee Ki-hwan; MORE; Lee Do-hyeong | Lim Jun-sik; Lee Do-hyeong | Pink Lie OST Part 2 | Korean | 2022 | |
| "Still in you (Eng ver.)" | Shin Gwang-il; Haram | Lee Ki-hwan; Hong Seol-young; Lee Do-hyeong | Lee Ki-hwan; MORE; Lee Do-hyeong | Lim Jun-sik; Lee Do-hyeong | Pink Lie OST Part 2 | English | 2022 | |
| "Stove" (난로) | Lucy | Jo Won-sang; Choi Sang-yeop; Shin Ye-chan; Shin Gwang-il | Jo Won-sang; O.YEON | Jo Won-sang; Choi Sang-yeop; Shin Ye-chan; Shin Gwang-il; O.YEON; Park Ji-hwan | INSIDE | Korean | 2021 | |
| "Straight Line" | Lucy | Jo Won-sang; Choi Sang-yeop; Benji | Jo Won-sang | Jo Won-sang; O.YEON; Park Ji-hwan | PANORAMA | Korean | 2020 | |
| "Swim" | Lee Ju-hyuk; Shin Gwang-il; Shin Ye-chan; Jo Won-sang | Herrington Harry; Hall Chris; Jack Wilson; Shiner Natassja; Sam Morris | Hall Chris; Jack Wilson; Shiner Natassja; Sam Morris | Lee Ju-hyuk; Shin Gwang-il; Shin Ye-chan; Jo Won-sang | JTBC Superband Episode 11 | English | 2019 | |
| "Swing" (그네) | Choi Sang-yeop | | | | YEOP x 2 | Korean | 2017 | |

== T ==
| Song | Artist(s) | Writer(s) | | | Album/Single | Language | Year | Ref. |
| Song | Artist(s) | Lyrics | Composition | Arrangement | Album/Single | Language | Year | Ref. |
|---|---|---|---|---|---|---|---|---|
| "That's My Only World" (그것만이 내 세상) | Ken; Choi Sang-yeop | Choi Sung-won | | Jisang | Duet Song Festival Episode 6 | Korean | 2016 | |
| "The Answer" (쉬운 답) | Daybreak; Lucy | Lee Won-seok | Jo Won-sang; Yoon Jong-shin; Lee Won-seok | Daybreak; Hong Jun | Daybreak X LUCY : Part.1 | Korean | 2022 | |
| "The knight who can't die and the silk cradle" (못 죽는 기사와 비단 요람) | Lucy | Jo Won-sang | Jo Won-sang; O.YEON; Choi Young-hoon | Jo Won-sang; O.YEON; Choi Young-hoon; T-lack | The knight who can't die and the silk cradle | Korean | 2024 | |
| "The Man in Shinsadong" (신사동 그 사람) | Lucy | Jung Eun-yi | Nam Gook-in | Lucy | Immortal Songs | Korean | 2021 | |
| "Those Days" (그날들) | Choi Sang-yeop | Kim Chang-gi | | Choi Il-ho; Kim Jae-hyun | Immortal Songs | Korean | 2026 | |
| "Tied Up" (바쁘거든) | Lucy | Jo Won-sang | Jo Won-sang; BYMORE; Choi Young-hoon | | INSERT COIN | Korean | 2023 | |
| "Too Late to Say I Love You (Feat. Jo Won-sang(LUCY))" (사랑한다고 하긴 너무 늦었나봐요 (Feat. 조원상(LUCY))) | JUNE; Jo Won-sang | JUNE | JUNE heejae jvn | | Seasons of Love 0.2 | Korean | 2025 | |
| "Two Faced" | Lucy | Holy Holy; Big Gyu; Sam | Holy Holy; Big Gyu | Holy Holy | Your Throne X LUCY | Korean | 2026 | |

== U ==
| Song | Artist(s) | Writer(s) | | | Album/Single | Language | Year | Ref. |
| Song | Artist(s) | Lyrics | Composition | Arrangement | Album/Single | Language | Year | Ref. |
|---|---|---|---|---|---|---|---|---|
| "Unbelievable" (아니 근데 진짜) | Lucy | Jo Won-sang | Jo Won-sang; O.YEON; Choi Young-hoon | | INSERT COIN | Korean | 2023 | |
| "Unplugged" | Choi Sang-yeop | | | | YEOP x 2 | Korean | 2017 | |
| "Until I Fall Asleep" (잠들때까지) | Choi Sang-yeop | | | | YEOP x 2 | Korean | 2017 | |
| "Until the Day Dream Comes True" (꿈이 이뤄질 날까지) | Choi Sang-yeop | Han Jun; Park Se-jun | Lee Yu-jin; Park Se-jun | Lee Yu-jin | My First First Love OST Part.1 | Korean | 2019 | |

== V ==
| Song | Artist(s) | Writer(s) | | | Album/Single | Language | Year | Ref. |
| Song | Artist(s) | Lyrics | Composition | Arrangement | Album/Single | Language | Year | Ref. |
|---|---|---|---|---|---|---|---|---|
| "Villain" (빌런) | Lucy | Jo Won-sang | Jo Won-sang; Choi Young-hoon; O.YEON; EUGENE | | FROM. | Korean | 2024 | |
| "Virtual Insanity" | Jo Won-sang; Lee Kang-ho; Ha Hyun-sang; Jung Sul | Katz Simon; Smith Toby; Jay Kay; Buchanan Wallis; Stuart Zender | | Jo Won-sang; Lee Kang-ho; Ha Hyun-sang; Jung Sul | JTBC Superband Episode 6 | English | 2019 | |
| "Viva La Vida" | Ha Hyun-sang; Hong Jin-ho; Shin Ye-chan | Guy Berryman; Chris Martin; Jonny Buckland; Will Champion | | Ha Hyun-sang; Hong Jin-ho; Shin Ye-chan | JTBC Superband Episode 3, 4 | English | 2019 | |

== W ==
| Song | Artist(s) | Writer(s) | | | Album/Single | Language | Year | Ref. |
| Song | Artist(s) | Lyrics | Composition | Arrangement | Album/Single | Language | Year | Ref. |
|---|---|---|---|---|---|---|---|---|
| "Wakey Wakey" (잠깨) | Lucy | Jo Won-sang | Jo Won-sang; EUGENE; O.YEON; Choi Young-hoon | | WAJANGCHANG | Korean | 2025 | |
| "Wakey Wakey (Childish ver.)" (잠깨 (Childish ver.)) | Lucy | Jo Won-sang | Jo Won-sang; EUGENE; O.YEON; Choi Young-hoon | | Childish | Korean | 2026 | |
| "Walter" | Choi Sang-yeop | | | | Brain, Your Choice of Romance Season 2 OST | Korean | 2022 | |
| "Wanted" (원하고 원했던) | Choi Sang-yeop | Woo Ji-hun; Park Se-jun | | Woo Ji-hun | My First First Love OST Part.1 | Korean | 2019 | |
| "Watermelon" (수박깨러가) | Lucy | Jo Won-sang; Choi Sang-yeop | Jo Won-sang | Jo Won-sang; O.YEON; Park Ji-hwan | PANORAMA | Korean | 2020 | |
| "We will fly away (Feat. Song Eun-hye (송은혜))" | Lucy | Shin Gwang-il; Shin Ye-chan | Shin Gwang-il; Add Blessed | Shin Gwang-il; Add Blessed; Shin Ye-chan | Childhood | Korean | 2022 | |
| "When Tomorrow Comes (Rock Ver.) (내일이 찾아오면 (Rock Ver.)) | Choi Sang-yeop | —N/a | Oh Seok-jun | Han Bam | Seoul Busters OST Part. 1 | Korean | 2024 | |
| "Where's Your Love" (사랑은 어쩌고) | Lucy | Jo Won-sang dohun | Jo Won-sang dohun EUGENE; O.YEON; Choi Young-hoon; DINT | Jo Won-sang dohun EUGENE; O.YEON; Choi Young-hoon | Sunflower | Korean | 2025 | |
| "Where's Your Love (Childish ver.)" (사랑은 어쩌고 (Childish ver.)) | Lucy | Jo Won-sang dohun | Jo Won-sang dohun EUGENE; O.YEON; Choi Young-hoon; DINT | Jo Won-sang dohun EUGENE; O.YEON; Choi Young-hoon | Childish | Korean | 2026 | |
| "Why don't you feel" | Choi Sang-yeop | Kim Ye-eun | ONEO | | Pink Lie OST Part 2 | Korean | 2022 | |
| "Why you hate..." (미워하지 않아도 될 수많은 이유) | Lucy | Jo Won-sang | Jo Won-sang dohun EUGENE; O.YEON; Choi Young-hoon | | WAJANGCHANG | Korean | 2025 | |
| "Why you hate... (Childish ver.)" (미워하지 않아도 될 수많은 이유 (Childish ver.)) | Lucy | Jo Won-sang | Jo Won-sang dohun EUGENE; O.YEON; Choi Young-hoon | | Childish | Korean | 2026 | |
| "With me (Electrifying Confession X LUCY)" (같이 가자 (전력고백 X LUCY)) | Lucy | CaptainPlanet; Han Kyeong-su | | | With me (Electrifying Confession X LUCY) | Korean | 2025 | |
| "Wonder" (봄인지 여름인지) | Lucy | Shin Gwang-il; Shin Ye-chan; Choi Sang-yeop; Lee Jae-jun | Shin Gwang-il; Add Blessed; Subbie | Shin Gwang-il; Add Blessed | Gatcha! | Korean | 2021 | |

== Y ==
| Song | Artist(s) | Writer(s) | | | Album/Single | Language | Year | Ref. |
| Song | Artist(s) | Lyrics | Composition | Arrangement | Album/Single | Language | Year | Ref. |
|---|---|---|---|---|---|---|---|---|
| "You & Me" (넌 혹시, 난 괜히) | Lucy | Jo Won-sang; Eunsong | | Jo Won-sang; Eunsong; BYMORE; Choi Young-hoon | Childhood | Korean | 2022 | |
| "You are my light" (나는 너야) | Lucy | Choi Sang-yeop; Jo Won-sang; Shin Gwang-il; Shin Ye-chan | | Choi Sang-yeop | Childhood | Korean | 2022 | |
| "You're right" (맞네) | Lucy | Jo Won-sang; Kang Ye-jun | Jo Won-sang; Choi Young-hoon | Jo Won-sang; Choi Young-hoon; Park Ji-hwan | BLUE | Korean | 2021 | |
| "Your call" | Choi Sang-yeop | —N/a | Choi Sang-yeop | | IDOL I OST | 2026 | | |
