= Lucy (South Korean band) =

South Korean band

- LUCY in 2026

Background information
- Origin: South Korea
- Genres: Rock, synth-pop, ambient
- Years active: 2019–present
- Label: Mystic Story
- Members: Shin Ye-chan; Choi Sang-yeop; Jo Won-sang; Shin Gwang-il
- Past members: Lee Ju Hyuk
- Website: www.mystic89.net/artist/lucy

Lucy (Korean: 루시; stylized in all caps) is a South Korean band formed through JTBC's television talent show Superband in 2019. The band finished in second place in the competition. After the competition, Lee Joo-hyuk was replaced by Choi Sang-yeop. Lucy joined Mystic Entertainment. They debuted on May 8, 2020, with their single album, Dear..

== Name ==
The group's name originates from the dog that resided where Wonsang's studio was during Superband. However, Gwang-il also explained that Lucy also comes from the Latin "lux" meaning light.

== Members ==
=== Current members ===
- Shin Ye-chan (신예찬) – violin, leader (2019-present)
- Choi Sang-yeop (최상엽) – vocals, guitars (2019-present)
- Jo Won-sang (조원상) – bass (2019-present)
- Shin Gwang-il (신광일) – vocals, drums (2019-present)

=== Former members ===
- Lee Ju-hyuk (이주혁) – vocals (2019)

== Discography ==
=== Studio albums ===
Title	Album details	Peak chart positions		Sales
Title	Album details	KOR	JPN	Sales
Childhood	Released: August 17, 2022; Label: Mystic Story; Formats: CD, digital download	6	—	KOR: 38,647
Childish	Released: April 29, 2026; Label: Mystic Story; Formats: CD, digital download	16	30	KOR: 32,068; JPN: 991

=== Extended plays ===
Title	EP details	Peak chart positions	Sales
Title	EP details	KOR	Sales
Panorama	Released: August 26, 2020; Label: Mystic Story; Formats: CD, digital download	30	KOR: 2,480
Blue	Released: December 7, 2021; Label: Mystic Story; Formats: CD, digital download	8	KOR: 27,291
Insert Coin	Released: February 23, 2023; Label: Mystic Story; Formats: CD, digital download	10	KOR: 40,700
Fever (열)	Released: August 17, 2023; Label: Mystic Story; Formats: CD, digital download	13	KOR: 49,950
From.	Released: August 16, 2024; Label: Mystic Story; Formats: CD, digital download	5	KOR: 50,000
Wajangchang (와장창)	Released: April 23, 2025; Label: Mystic Story; Formats: CD, digital download	7	KOR: 59,994
Sunflower (선)	Released: October 30, 2025; Label: Mystic Story; Formats: CD, digital download	10	KOR: 60,000

=== Single albums ===
Title	Album details	Peak chart positions	Sales
Title	Album details	KOR	Sales
Dear.	Released: May 8, 2020; Label: Mystic Story; Formats: Promo CD, digital download	—	—N/a
Snooze	Released: November 12, 2020; Label: Mystic Story; Formats: CD, digital download	33	KOR: 3,172
Inside	Released: February 16, 2021; Label: Mystic Story; Formats: CD, digital download	30	KOR: 3,965
Gatcha!	Released: June 16, 2021; Label: Mystic Story; Formats: CD, digital download	17	KOR: 16,855
Boogie Man	Released: December 5, 2023; Label: Mystic Story; Formats: CD, digital download	9	KOR: 20,000
The Knight Who Can't Die and the Silk Cradle	Released: March 20, 2024; Label: Mystic Story; Formats: digital download	—	—N/a

=== Singles ===
Title	Year	Peak chart positions	Album
Title	Year	KOR	Album
"Flowering" (개화)	2020	70	Dear.
"Jogging" (조깅)	2020	—	Panorama
"Snooze" (선잠)	2020	—	Snooze
"Hero" (히어로)	2021	— (Note: "Hero" did not enter the Gaon Digital Chart, but it peaked at number 69 on the component Gaon Download Chart.)	Inside
"I Got U"	2021	— (Note: "I Got U" did not enter the Gaon Digital Chart, but it peaked at number 97 on the component Gaon Download Chart.)	Gatcha!
"Irrelevant Answer" (동문서답)	2021	— (Note: "Irrelevant Answer" did not enter the Gaon Digital Chart, but it peaked at number 104 on the component Gaon Download Chart.)	Non-album single
"Rolling Rolling" (떼굴떼굴)	2021	— (Note: "Rolling Rolling" did not enter the Gaon Digital Chart, but it peaked at number 106 on the component Gaon Download Chart.)	Blue
"Play" (놀이)	2022	—	Childhood
"Unbelievable" (아니근데진짜)	2023	—	Insert Coin
"Haze" (아지랑이)	2023	—	Fever
"Boogie Man"	2023	—	Boogie Man
"The Knight Who Can't Die and the Silk Cradle" (못 죽는 기사와 비단 요람)	2024	— (Note: "The Knight Who Can't Stand and the Silk Cradle" did not enter the Circle Digital Chart, but it peaked at number 53 on the component Circle Download Chart.)	The Knight Who Can't Die and the Silk Cradle
"Villain" (빌런)	2024	—	From.
"She's Smiling"	2024	—	Non-album single
"Into The Day"	2025	—	Non-album single
"Wakey Wakey" (잠깨)	2025	—	Wajangchang
"Hippo" (하마)	2025	—	Wajangchang
"First Love"	2025	—	Non-album single
"What About Love" (사랑은 어쩌고)	2025	—	선
"전체관람가" (All Ages)	2026	—	Childish
"—" denotes releases that did not chart or were not released in that region.

=== Remake ===
Title	Year	Album
"Run Away" (항상 엔진을 켜둘께)	2022	Non-album single
"Someday in the 21st Century" (21세기의 어떤 날 - 페퍼톤스 (Peppertones))	2022	Panorama
"Snooze" (선잠)	2022	Snooze

=== OSTs ===
Title	Year	Album
"I Don't Wanna Heart You" (서툴러서)	2020	Zombie Detective OST Part.2
"Run to You"	2020	Run On OST Part.1
"Fly High" (날아올라)	2022	Moonshine OST Part.4
"Police Class"	2022	Rookie Cops OST Part.2
"Light Up!"	2022	Lord of Heroes OST Part.1
"Firework"	2022	Dear X Who Doesn't Love Me OST Part 4
"Ant, Go Run"	2022	Stock Struck OST Part.2
"Diamond" (눈이 부신다)	2022	Gaus Electronics OST Part.1
"Little Star" (작은 별)	2022	Bad Prosecutor OST Part.2
"Love is Here"	2023	Romance by Romance OST Part 1
"Still Fighting"	2023	Miraculous Brothers OST Part.5
"I'll Find You" (찾았다)	2023	Snap and Spark OST Part.1
"Expression of Love" (애정표현)	2023	Our Secret Diary OST
"Hey!"	2024	Flex X Cop OST Part.1
"GO!"	2024	High School Return of a Gangster OST Part. 1
"Grey"	2024	Grey (나쁜 기억 지우개 X LUCY) [Soundtrack]
"Daylight"	2024	Parole Examiner Lee, Pt.1 (Original Soundtrack)
"A New Chapter"	2024	Sorry Not Sorry OST Part 1
"Shine a Light"	2025	My Dearest Nemesis OST Part.2
"A-YO"	2025	Undercover High School OST Part.4 (Soundtrack)
"HIGHLIGHT (Garbage Time)"	2025	HIGHLIGHT (Garbage Time)
"I'll Dive Into You"	2025	I'll Dive Into You (Villain With a Crush X LUCY) (Original Webtoon Soundtrack)
"With Me (Electrifying Confession X LUCY)"	2025	With Me (Electrifying Confession X LUCY)
"HALLEY"	2025	Spirit Fingers OST Part.1
"Echoes of You"	2025	IDOL I (Original Soundtrack)
"Two Faced"	2026	Your Throne X LUCY
"Starlight"	2026	We Are All Trying Here OST Part.2
"Stay"	2026	A love other than yours OST Part. 2

=== Miscellaneous ===
Title	Year	Description
"So Nice (GMF Theme Song)"	2024	Theme song released for the Grand Mint Festival

== Filmography ==
=== Television shows ===
Year	Channel	Show title	Notes
2019	JTBC	Superband	2nd place

== Tours ==
1st World Tour "written by FLOWER" (2024)
Date	City	Country	Venue
March 30, 2024	Seoul	Korea	Olympic Handball Gymnasium
March 31, 2024	Seoul	Korea	Olympic Handball Gymnasium
April 6, 2024	Macao	China	H853 Entertainment Place
April 26, 2024	Taipei	Taiwan	Zepp New Taipei
May 6, 2024	Tokyo	Japan	Shibuya Duo Music Exchange
May 23, 2024	Toronto	Canada	Lee's Palace
May 24, 2024	Montreal	Canada	Symposia Theater
May 26, 2024	Boston	United States	Sonia
May 27, 2024	New York City	United States	Queen's Theater
May 28, 2024	Philadelphia	United States	Temple Performing Arts
May 30, 2024	Pittsburgh	United States	Thunderbird Music Cafe
May 31, 2024	Cleveland	United States	Ariel La Salle Theater
June 1, 2024	Detroit	United States	Garden Theater
June 3, 2024	Chicago	United States	Anthenaeum Center Theater
June 5, 2024	Kansas City	United States	Gem Theater
June 6, 2024	Oklahoma City	United States	89th Street
June 8, 2024	Austin	United States	Come and Take It Live
June 9, 2024	Dallas	United States	Coppell Arts Center
June 11, 2024	Phoenix	United States	Mesa Arts Center
June 12, 2024	Las Vegas	United States	Fremont Country Club
June 13, 2024	Los Angeles	United States	Catch One
June 15, 2024	San Jose	United States	Montgomery Theater
June 17, 2024	Portland	United States	Star Theater
June 18, 2024	Seattle	United States	El Corazon
June 20, 2024	Vancouver	Canada	Rio Theater
August 24, 2024*	Seoul	Korea	Olympic Handball Gymnasium
August 25, 2024*	Seoul	Korea	Olympic Handball Gymnasium

== Awards and nominations ==
Name of the award ceremony, year presented, award category, nominee(s) and the result of the award
Award ceremony	Year	Category	Nominee/work	Result	Ref.
Hanteo Music Awards	2025	Special Award – Band	Lucy	Won	
Hanteo Music Awards	2025	Best Artist Pick	Lucy	Nominated	

== See also ==
- List of songs recorded by Lucy
