= Rookie Cops =

2022 South Korean television series

- Promotional poster
- Also known as: Rookies
- Hangul: 너와 나의 경찰수업
- Hanja: 너와 나의 警察授業
- Lit.: You and My Police Class
- RR: Neowa naui gyeongchalsueop
- MR: Nŏwa naŭi kyŏngch'alsuŏp
- Genre: Coming of age; Drama; Procedural; Romance
- Created by: Studio&NEW
- Written by: Lee Ha-na
- Directed by: Kim Byung-soo
- Starring: Kang Daniel; Chae Soo-bin; Lee Shin-young; Park Yoo-na
- Opening theme: "In The Dreams" by Kim Kyung-hee and Janet Suhh
- Country of origin: South Korea
- Original language: Korean
- No. of episodes: 16

Production
- Running time: 54–64 minutes
- Production companies: Studio&NEW; The Walt Disney Company (Korea)

Original release
- Network: Disney+
- Release: January 26 – March 16, 2022

Rookie Cops (Korean: 너와 나의 경찰수업) is a South Korean television series that aired between from January 26 and March 16, 2022, and consisted of 16 episodes. The series was written by Lee Ha-na, directed by Kim Byung-soo and starring Kang Daniel, Chae Soo-bin, Lee Shin-young, and Park Yoo-na. Rookie Cops revolves around police academy students enrolled at the elite Korean National Police University. It released two episodes every Wednesday at 17:00 (KST) on Disney+ via Star in select regions as the OTT's first Korean Star Originals drama.

== Synopsis ==
Rookie Cops follows the stories of freshmen recruits at the elite Korean National Police University (KNPU), which is said to be one of the most conservative and exclusive campuses in Korea. Wi Seung-hyun (Kang Daniel) is an honors freshman who wants to take after his father. Everything is going according to plan until he encounters Go Eun-kang (Chae Soo-bin). The youth investigation drama depicts the students' dreams, love, challenges, and ambitions.

== Cast ==
=== Main ===
- Kang Daniel as Wi Seung-hyun, a passionate youth who cannot stand seeing injustice, he aims to follow in the footsteps of his father who is the head of the Gyeonggi Dongbu Police Agency. He places first on the college entrance exam on his second attempt.
- Chae Soo-bin as Go Eun-kang, is active and courageous, she is a troublemaking freshman who enters the police force to chase after an unrequited love and manages to enter the police university after being rejected at first.
  - Oh Ah-rin as young Go Eun-kang.
- Lee Shin-young as Kim Tak, a freshman from the junior national judo team who embodies the spirit and passion of youth, is accustomed to being alone but Wi Seung-hyun becomes his one true friend.
  - Choi Yoon-woo as young Kim Tak.
- Park Yoo-na as Gi Han-na, a freshman who is self-reliant and a realist with a unique prideful charm, does not miss on ranking first place in the department. Her individualistic tendency creates tension with other students who value group life.

=== Supporting ===
==== Students ====
- Park Sung-joon as Yoo Dae-il, a "pure macho" freshman, he considers himself a successful police drama fan because he decided to become an officer after watching Signal, and passes the entrance exam after three tries.
- Min Do-hee as Woo Ju-young, a freshman from a science high school who dreams of becoming a forensics investigator.
- Kim Woo-seok as Seo Bum-ju, a sincere and upright freshman who sometimes has excessive thoughts and worries that reveal a timid side; he is meticulous with planning and has unexpected dance skills.
- Cheon Young-min as Shin A-ri, an ulzzang freshman who is interested in fashion and appearance; has a gloomy image, but in actuality has a soft personality and gradually grows closer to her classmates.
- Park Yeon-woo as Jang Ju-chan, a fourth-year student, president of the student council, and Go Eun-kang's first love.
- Chung Su-bin as Baek Sun-yu, head of the female student dormitory is also active in school activities, such as training and student council.
- Kim Seung-ho as Pyo Hyun-seok, the head of public relations at the police academy, is friendly and buys food for the juniors but has a dark secret.
- Lee Joon-woo as Um Hyuk, a strict principled upperclassman and the head of the police academy's education team in charge of training new students.
- Seo Bum-june as Choi In-sik.

==== Faculty ====
- Kim Sang-ho as Cha Yoo-gon, a witty police science professor who as a police officer had run wild in the past without fear of the world before an incident changed his outlook on life.
- Seo Yi-sook as Kim Soon-young, the university dean.
- Choi Woo-ri as Bang Hee-sun, the charismatic criminal psychology professor.
- Kang Ae-shim as dormitory janitor.

==== Family ====
- Son Chang-min as Wi Gi-yong, Wi Seung-hyun's respected father who is a high ranked police officer.
- Ji Soo-won as Oh Sook-ja, Wi Seung-hyun's mother with an extraordinary affection for her son.
- Lee Moon-sik as Go Yang-chul, Go Eun-kang's warmhearted and humorous father.
- Jung Young-joo as Lee Hee-sook, Go Eun-kang's blunt but affectionate mother and owner of a chicken restaurant.
- Son So-mang as Go Mi-kang, Go Eun-kang's older sister and an art graduate student with a pure and honest charm.
- Sa Kang as Gi Han-na's mother.
- Lee Moon-soo as Yoo Dae-il's grandfather.

==== Others ====
- Kim Yool-ho as Chu Man-seok, a heinous character who commits evil acts.
- Hyun Woo-sung as Kang Nam-gi, a passionate detective struggling to find the truth of the case.
- Park Ji-hoon as one of the bullies at the billiard hall.
- Lee Woo-je as one of the bullies at the billiard hall.
- Ahn Do Kyu as Hong Yoon-ki, the part-time employee being bullied at the billiard hall.
- Kim Kwon as Jo Han-sol, Asia's young leader and CEO of creative start-up investments.
- Jung Yeo-Jun as Shin Eui-seok, the chief secretary who follows the dire personal life of Korean-American CEO Jo Han-sol.
- Choi Jae-hyun as Min-yong, Wi Seung-hyun's friend.
- Park Sang-hoon as Lee Se-hyun, the fraudster who was a victim of a bigger scheme.
- Lee Se-mi as Min Hae-ji, the flustered woman at the nightclub.

=== Special appearances ===
- Kwak Si-yang as Kim Hyun-soo, a fourth-year student at KNPU and Kim Tak's older brother.
- Shin Ye-eun as Jang So-yeon, a freshman who dropped out in the middle of the orientation program.
- Go Youn-jung as the profile picture for Yoo Dae-il's blind date.
- Park Sang-nam as Go Eun-kang's blind date.

== Episodes ==
No.	Title	Directed by	Written by	Original release date
1	"Episode 1"	Kim Byung-soo	Lee Ha-na	January 26, 2022
10 years ago, Kim Hyun-soo (Kwak Si-yang) was beaten and stabbed multiple times and eventually died after getting hit by a dump truck. In 2017, present-time, Wi Seung-hyun (Kang Daniel) conflicts with a senior in charge of training new students at the Korean National Police University (KNPU) after seeing fellow freshman Jang So-yeon (Shin Ye-eun) being forcefully disciplined. Not being able to withstand the rigorous training, Jang So-yeon drops out of KNPU in the middle of the orientation program. Following her departure, Wi Seung-hyun and Go Eun-kang (Chae Soo-bin) meet again at KNPU as the latter fills in the recently vacated position after a less-than-ideal first encounter between the two.
2	"Episode 2"	Kim Byung-soo	Lee Ha-na	January 26, 2022
Go Eun-kang is accused of secretly filming extra training after a USB flash drive falls out of her jacket pocket and is confiscated by senior trainer, Um Hyuk (Lee Joon-woo). She is forced to leave her dorm room and stay in the detention room while awaiting potential expulsion from KNPU. In an effort to clear her name and avoid expulsion, Go Eun-kang enlists the help of Wi Seung-hyun to find the real culprit behind the hidden camera.
3	"Episode 3"	Kim Byung-soo	Lee Ha-na	February 2, 2022
The real culprit behind the hidden camera is revealed to be Gi Han-na (Park Yoo-na), Go Eun-kang's roommate. To avoid expulsion at the Student Disciplinary Committee meeting, Gi Han-na threatens to reveal the punishment methods enforced at KNPU to the public if she is no longer a student there. She receives three months probation instead of being expelled because university dean Kim Soon-young (Seo Yi-sook) wants to avoid public backlash. The episode ends with the abolition of the Cheongram Education following an all-inclusive freshmen protest led by Wi Seung-hyun and a ceremony to commemorate the freshmen transferring from the orientation program to becoming official students at KNPU.
4	"Episode 4"	Kim Byung-soo	Lee Ha-na	February 2, 2022
After discovering Jang Ju-chan (Park Yeon-woo) already has a girlfriend, Go Eun-kang considers dropping out of KNPU. She later changes her mind following an incident where she and Wi Seung-hyun stop a purse thief with their combined efforts. In a flashback, Gi Han-na is being bullied by her high school classmates when she eventually fights back and stabs one of the perpetrators with a twig. She's brought into the West Gangneung Police Station where police detective Kang Nam-gi (Hyun Woo-sung) persuades the perpetrators' mother not to press charges against Gi Han-na. Trusting him after this incident, she later abides by his request to set up a hidden camera during training at KNPU.
5	"Episode 5"	Kim Byung-soo	Lee Ha-na	February 9, 2022
Go Eun-kang vows to completely move on from her first love and agrees to go on a group blind date with Shin A-ri (Cheon Young-min) and Woo Ju-young (Min Do-hee). After deciding to stop by a billiard hall while dining out, Wi Seung-hyun and Kim Tak (Lee Shin-young) fight a group of bullies harassing a part-time employee working at the cash register. Kim Tak takes it too far and Wi Seung-hyun has to stop him. A senior, Pyo Hyun-suk (Kim Seung-ho), from KNPU tells them that he will take care of the situation for them. Later on, Wi Seung-hyun sees that same senior cheating during an exam. He tells Pyo Hyun-suk to turn himself in but is shown a video of Kim Tak repeatedly punching one of the bullies at the billiard hall as a threat to keep him quiet.
6	"Episode 6"	Kim Byung-soo	Lee Ha-na	February 9, 2022
Following an anonymous tip, later revealed to be given by Gi Han-na, Um Hyuk confronts Pyo Hyun-suk about cheating during an exam. Pyo Hyun-suk assumes that the tip was given by Wi Seung-hyun despite his attempt to blackmail him and orders the bullies to upload the video he took of Wi Seung-hyun and Kim Tak at the billiard hall with a fabricated story on the KNPU web portal as retaliation. When the part-time employee that was present during the fight is brought in for questioning, he corroborates the fabricated story. In an effort to clear his and Kim Tak's names, Wi Seung-hyun enlists the help of Go Eun-kang to find the part-time employee and convince him to tell the truth. The part-time employee is adamant on not telling the truth to protect himself and his younger brother but changes his mind after reading Wi Seung-hyun's note.
7	"Episode 7"	Kim Byung-soo	Lee Ha-na	February 16, 2022
In preparation of Cheongram Sports Day, practices are held among students based on assigned teams. Go Eun-kang wants Wi Seung-hyun to be her training partner but is disappointed when she finds out that he is already training with Gi Han-na. Seeing this, Kim Tak offers to train Gi Han-na on behalf of Wi Seung-hyun so that the latter can instead practice with Go Eun-kang. Seung-hyun father gave a speech to the school and Seung-hyun challenged his father about the talk; Dae-il and Bum-ju overheard a few senior talking about how Seung-hyun challenged his father so openly.
8	"Episode 8"	Kim Byung-soo	Lee Ha-na	February 16, 2022
After discovering Jang Ju-chan and his girlfriend recently broke up, Go Eun-kang tries to comfort him by offering to go out for drinks together. Wi Seung-hyun crashes their night out under the pretense of a coincidence and later mishears what he assumes is Go Eun-kang confessing her feelings to Jang Ju-chan. During Cheongram Sports Day, Go Eun-kang aggravates a previous injury and can't finish the running component in the triathlon she's participating in. Gi Han-na helps her all the way to the finish line. Towards the end of Cheongram Sports Day, Wi Seung-hyun pulls Go Eun-kang aside to talk and they both confess to having feelings for each other and share a kiss in a telephone booth.
9	"Episode 9"	Kim Byung-soo	Lee Ha-na	February 23, 2022
Wi Seung-hyun and Go Eun-kang start a secret relationship after their first kiss because KNPU does not allow students to date each other. During a weekend trip going back home, Wi Seung-hyun gets drunk while on a night out with seniors from KNPU celebrating a birthday. He misses plans he made with Go Eun-kang due to this and instead buys her dinner and personally delivers it. Go Eun-kang finds a drunk Wi Seung-hyun outside her house and carries him inside where he spends the night in her room. The following day, he's helping her practice her driving when they coincidentally run into Woo Ju-young, Yoo Dae-il (Park Sung-joon), and Seo Bum-ju (Kim Woo-seok) who are trying to catch a fraudster.
10	"Episode 10"	Kim Byung-soo	Lee Ha-na	February 23, 2022
After catching the fraudster who sold Woo Ju-young an empty package, the five KNPU students find out that he is also a victim to a bigger scheme. As summer vacation begins, freshmen get ready for field training at police substations. Wi Seung-hyun, Kim Tak, and Go Eun-kang are assigned to the same "Cheongju" division where the latter finds out that the fraudster Lee Se-hyun (Park Sang-hoon) is missing. With the help of the security cameras in his neighborhood, Go Eun-kang discovers that Lee Se-hyun was kidnapped. Wi Seung-hyun, Kim Tak, and Go Eun-kang work together to stop the bigger scheme and rescue Lee Se-hyun. The three are later awarded a Certificate of Commendation for their actions.
11	"Episode 11"	Kim Byung-soo	Lee Ha-na	March 2, 2022
In a private room of a nightclub, Min Hae-ji attempts to blackmail Jo Han-sol (Kim Kwon) with secretly recorded footage. Her attempt fails and she runs out of the room while he's distracted because she fears that he will not voluntarily let her leave. While at the same nightclub, Wi Seung-hyun drops his phone when he runs into a flustered woman and is in possession of her phone as a result of the mix up. He later exchanges the phones through Jo Han-sol's secretary who claims that he came to get the phone on behalf of the woman because she is too drunk to do it herself. Later on, Wi Seung-hyun and Go Eun-kang find out that the flustered woman from the nightclub has gone missing.
12	"Episode 12"	Kim Byung-soo	Lee Ha-na	March 2, 2022
During a group trip to Gangneung, Wi Seung-hyun and Go Eun-kang meet at dawn while everyone else is asleep. They watch the sunrise together and stumble upon a woman's body at the end of a breakwater while walking along the quiet beach. The dead body turns out to be the flustered woman from the nightclub, Min Hae-ji, that ran into Wi Seung-hyun. Meanwhile, Jo Han-sol puts more pressure on his secretary Shin Eui-seok (Jung Yeo-Jun) to find the other copy of the footage Min Hae-ji recorded in secret and kept as insurance in case her blackmail attempt didn't work. With the help of Wi Seung-hyun and Kim Tak, Go Eun-kang finds this hidden footage as her sister Go Mi-kang (Son So-mang) was coincidentally friends with Min Hae-ji. She gives it to Wi Seung-hyun with plans that he hands it over to police detective Kang Nam-gi.
13	"Episode 13"	Kim Byung-soo	Lee Ha-na	March 9, 2022
Thinking back to a picture Shin A-ri posted with Jo Han-sol, Go Eun-kang makes the connection that one of the men captured in the hidden footage was Jo Han-sol and advises Wi Seung-hyun to instead hand the evidence over to his father Wi Gi-yong (Son Chang-min). Following her advice, Wi Seung-hyun lets police detective Kang Nam-gi know of the change in plans. He receives a phone call from an enraged Kang Nam-gi who asks to meet with him where he lets Wi Seung-hyun know the truth about his father in relation to the case of Kim Hyun-soo.
14	"Episode 14"	Kim Byung-soo	Lee Ha-na	March 9, 2022
After being told the truth about his brother's death by Jo Han-sol, Kim Tak confronts both Wi Seung-hyun and his father. Misunderstanding Wi Seung-hyun's involvement in the case, Kim Tak ends their friendship and switches dorm rooms to avoid the former at KNPU. He eventually withdraws from the university because he feels disillusioned with the police and returns home to his grandmother in Gimhae. Wi Seung-hyun and Go Eun-kang take a trip to Kim Tak's hometown in an attempt to convince him to come back. Meanwhile, Yoo Dae-il starts working as a chauffeur after overhearing that Gi Han-na is in need of money.
15	"Episode 15"	Kim Byung-soo	Lee Ha-na	March 16, 2022
the group later found out that Yoo Dae-il have passed away with no solid evidence to why he crashed to the river. Gi Han-na later found out that her drive that Yoo Dae-il shared has a new video where he wanted to share the photo they took on a date together. The rest saw the footage and told professor Cha Yoo-gon about the reason why Dae-il passed away. As Cha Yoo-gon investigated, he realised that the people who committed the crime have already altered the police reports leaving the inaction of professor Cha Yoo-gon to make the gang leak the video that Dae-il took to pressure the police to deal with the aftermath of the leaked video. Go Eun-kang plans to meet Jo Han-sol privately to the gang and Wi Seung-hyun actively protested but Eun-kang assured Wi Seung-hyun that she can protect herself.= to get a recorded confession from Jo Han-sol.
16	"Episode 16"	Kim Byung-soo	Lee Ha-na	March 16, 2022
As they start their plan, Eun-kang is kidnapped by the kidnapper and the gang starts to track where Eun-kang is headed. then the group placed tracking device on Eun-kang. As Jo Han-sol realised that Eun-kang were tapping him as Eun-kang berated him to coerce him to spill every crime that he has committed. After a brief fight, Wi Seung-hyun beat Jo Han-sol and was hand cuffed by Seung-hyun by cuffs given by his father. Han-sol lawyer asked his boss to be quiet in the interrogation but Han-na slipped a recorder in the pocket of the suit before breaking free to try to hit Han-na but Eun-kang stopped him by punching him and giving him a bloodied nose before being apprehended to the police vehicle. The gang then proceed to be treated to fried chicken and beer from Eun-kang parents as the gang reminisces on how Dae-il would have cheered them on. As they toasted their beer, they thanked each other for having each other back. In an epilogue, Han-na told Eun-kang and Seung-hyun that she wants to be a double agent while using the money to eventually save her mother from the debt that she was in. Fast forward 2 years later, Kim Tak and Han-na have become the member of the police academy team and is instructing the trainees to their basic drill. As the president of the student council, Wi Seung-hyun congratulated the trainee for passing their entrance into the Korean National Police University, he introduced the members of the student council not before Shin A-ri chastised her freshman junior for mistakes while being the head of promotion of the school not before being scolded by Ju-young for making the same mistake when she was a freshman in KNPU. In their graduation, Wi Seung-hyun got a President's Award while Gil Han-na was awarded the Prime Minister's Award.

== Production ==
=== Development ===
On December 22, 2020, Studio&NEW disclosed that it would use invested funds and secure secondary copyrights to produce upcoming works, including Rookie Cops. It was first reported on February 1, 2021, that Rookie Cops is an original series that would air on Disney+. On April 30, 2021, the NEW and The Walt Disney Company Korea's five-year content partnership was formalized with Rookie Cops being named as one of the two immediate works part of that deal.

=== Casting ===
On February 1 and March 9, 2021, Kang Daniel and Chae Soo-bin were reported to be reviewing the offers, respectively. Their lead roles were not officially confirmed until their appearances at the Disney+ APAC Content Showcase on October 14. In May, there was news of Min Do-hee, Lee Shin-young, Kim Woo-seok, and Shin Ye-eun being cast. The following month, Kim Sang-ho and Park Yoo-na confirmed their casting followed by Sa Kang in July. Kwak Si-yang's special appearance was confirmed in October while the major cast lineup was revealed in November.

=== Filming ===
It was reported on May 26, 2021, that filming began in early May following a script reading and concluded in November. On January 25, 2022, footage from the official table read was published.

== Release ==
In addition to South Korea, other Disney+ Star markets with Rookie Cops scheduled for January 26, 2022 included Singapore, Taiwan, Hong Kong, Japan, Australia, and New Zealand. The series aired on the same date for Malaysia, Indonesia, and Thailand via Disney+ Hotstar. Two episodes were released on the premiere date.

== Original soundtrack ==
The special single "Hush Hush (Korean Ver.)" was originally released on September 15, 2021 in the studio album Imaginary as a collaboration between Japanese musician Miyavi and Kang Daniel. The Korean version of the single was released specifically for this series soundtrack on March 9, 2022. The soundtrack was released in its entirety on March 16, 2022.

Rookie Cops (Original Television Soundtrack)

Soundtrack album by Various artists
- Released: March 16, 2022
- Genre: Soundtrack
- Languages: Korean; English
- Label: Music&New

=== Part 1 ===
Released on January 26, 2022
No.	Title	Lyrics	Music	Artist	Length
1.	"Because of You"	Chancellor; Purple; Knave	Chancellor; Purple; Knave	Chancellor	3:32
2.	"Because of You" (Inst.)		Chancellor; Purple; Knave		3:32
Total length:					7:04

=== Part 2 ===
Released on February 2, 2022
No.	Title	Lyrics	Music	Artist	Length
1.	"Police Class"	Nam Hye-seung; Park Jin-ho	Nam Hye-seung; Jeon Jong-hyuk; Huh Seok; Lee Jae-woo	Lucy	3:31
2.	"Police Class" (Inst.)		Nam Hye-seung; Jeon Jong-hyuk; Huh Seok; Lee Jae-woo		3:31
Total length:					7:02

=== Part 3 ===
Released on February 16, 2022
No.	Title	Lyrics	Music	Artist	Length
1.	"My Sunlight"	B-Rock; J-Lin; +1	B-Rock; J-Lin; +1	Ha Hyun-sang	3:06
2.	"My Sunlight" (Inst.)		B-Rock; J-Lin; +1		3:06
Total length:					6:12

=== Part 4 ===
Released on February 23, 2022
No.	Title	Lyrics	Music	Artist	Length
1.	"Time"	AVGS; JYMON	AVGS; JYMON; Nody Cika	Kwon Eun-bi	3:19
2.	"Time" (Inst.)		AVGS; JYMON; Nody Cika		3:19
Total length:					6:38

=== Part 5 ===
Released on March 2, 2022
No.	Title	Lyrics	Music	Artist	Length
1.	"What A Wonderful Day"	Lee Sang-in	Lee Sang-in	Dvwn	3:43
2.	"What A Wonderful Day" (Inst.)		Lee Sang-in		3:43
Total length:					7:26

=== Special ===
Released on March 9, 2022
No.	Title	Lyrics	Music	Artist	Length
1.	"Hush Hush (Korean Ver.)"	Miyavi; Kang Daniel; Lenard Skolnik; Sean Bowe; Chancellor	Miyavi; Lenard Skolnik; Jeff Miyahara; Yung Spielburg	Kang Daniel feat. Miyavi	3:01
2.	"Hush Hush" (Inst.)		Miyavi; Lenard Skolnik; Jeff Miyahara; Yung Spielburg		2:59
Total length:					6:00

== Reception ==
=== Critical reception ===
Prior to its release, Rookie Cops garnered attention for being K-pop idol Kang Daniel's acting debut. It was included in an article titled "A summary of the most talked about TV programs and issues in 2021" by Allure Korea. It was also included in YTN's ranking of the top five most anticipated OTT works for the first half of 2022 and the "30 Upcoming Korean Dramas to Put on Your Watch List in 2022" ranking by Tatler Asia.

Following its release, Rookie Cops repeatedly ranked first among the "Top 10 TV Shows on Disney+" in South Korea. It also occasionally ranked first on this same list in Taiwan while ranking in the top three of this list in Hong Kong, Singapore, and Japan. New Zealand news media website Stuff recommended Rookie Cops as the only Korean drama listed among five different series to watch on Disney+. The series was named by Variety as a contributing factor that helped Disney+ join the top five streamers in Korea. Despite initially airing in select regions, it also ranked seventh in the "Top 10 Most Watched K-Dramas Worldwide on Disney+ in 2022". In an article collecting Rolling Stone India's favorite Korean drama OSTs of 2022, "Because of You" was included in the list of ten with the writer stating that "the singer [Chancellor] enhances the delicate rendition of this lyrical composition, which is excellent in its own right".

=== Accolades ===
Name of the award ceremony, year presented, category, nominee of the award, and the result of the nomination
Award	Year	Category	Nominee	Result	Ref.
APAN Star Awards	2022	Best Original Soundtrack	"Hush Hush (Korean Ver.)"	Nominated	
Asia Artist Awards	2022	Potential Award – Actor	Kang Daniel	Won	
Asia Artist Awards	2022	Rookie of the Year – Actor	Kang Daniel	Won	
Blue Dragon Series Awards	2022	Best New Actor	Kang Daniel	Nominated	
Blue Dragon Series Awards	2022	Popularity Award	Kang Daniel	Won	
Korea First Brand Awards (Note: Established in 2004, the Korea First Brand Awards is an annual awards ceremony hosted by the Korea Consumer Brand Committee and organized by the Korea Consumer Forum.)	2023	Male Idol Actor	Kang Daniel	Won	
Seoul International Drama Awards	2022	Outstanding K-Pop Idol	Kang Daniel	Won	
