= Lee Joon-woo =

South Korean actor

- Born: Lee Joon-woo; 23 June 1992 (age 34); Busan, South Korea
- Other names: Lee Jun-wu, Lee Jun-u
- Occupations: Actor; model
- Years active: 2013–present
- Agent(s): Walnut & U Entertainment
- Known for: School 2017; Dokgo Rewind; Sweet Home

Lee Joon-woo is a South Korean actor and model. He is best known for his roles in dramas such as School 2017, Dokgo Rewind, Sweet Home, and Rookie Cops.

== Early life ==
He was born in Busan on June 23, 1992. He went to Seoul at the age of 18 and his parents transferred to Seoul. He attended high school and college to study acting. After he graduated from college, he majored in acting and signed with Walnut & U Entertainment.

== Career ==
He made his debut as an actor in 2013. The same year, he appeared in drama The Heirs. In 2017, he appeared in the drama School 2017. The next year, he appeared in the drama Dokgo Rewind. In 2020, he appeared in the drama Sweet Home as Ryu Jae-hwan.

== Filmography ==
=== Television series ===
Year	Title	Role	Ref.
2013	The Heirs	Student	
2017	School 2017	Go Hak-jung	
2018	Dokgo Rewind	Kim Dae-gi	
2020	Sweet Home	Ryu Jae-hwan / Jay	
2022	Rookie Cops	Uhm Hyuk	
2023	Sweet Home Season 2	Ryu Jae-hwan / Jay	
