= Kang Da-hyun =

South Korean actress (born 1992)

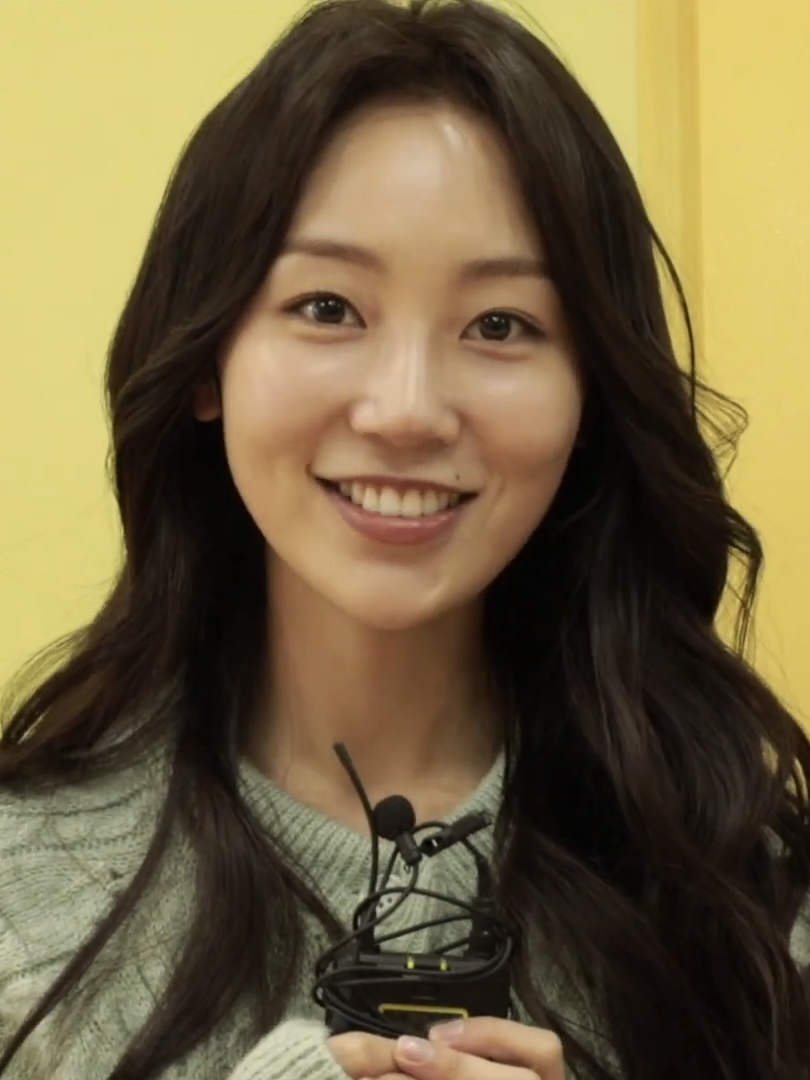
- Kang in February 2021
- Born: Kang Min-kyung; 6 September 1992 (age 34); South Korea
- Other names: Kang Da-hyeon, Gang Da-hyeon
- Education: Dankook University (Faculty of Performing Imagery)
- Occupations: Actress; model
- Years active: 2017–present
- Agent: IOK Company

Korean name
- Hangul: 강다현
- RR: Gang Dahyeon
- MR: Kang Tahyŏn

Kang Da-hyun (Korean: 강다현; born 6 September 1992) is a South Korean actress. She is known for her roles in dramas such as Dokgo Rewind, My Healing Love and Tale of Fairy. She also appeared in movies Along with the Gods: The Two Worlds, Puzzle and Roman Holiday.

== Early life and education ==
She was born on September 6, 1992, in South Korea. She attended Dankook University, she studied Imagery.

== Career ==
She joined Redline Entertainment in 2017 after she graduated. She made her debut as an actress in 2017, she appeared in drama Hospital Ship as Kwak Ji-eun. After that she appeared in several television dramas such as Dokgo Rewind, Tale of Fairy and My Healing Love. She also appeared in a number of movies Along with the Gods: The Two Worlds, Puzzle and Roman Holiday.

== Filmography ==
=== Film ===
Year	Title	Role	Ref.
2017	Roman Holiday	High school student	
2018	Along with the Gods: The Two Worlds	Ji-yeon	
2018	Puzzle	Convenience store part-time worker	
2020	God of Fight: Sirasoni	Min-kyung	

=== Television series ===
Year	Title	Role	Ref.
2017	Hospital Ship	Kwak Ji-eun	
2018	Sweet and Salty Office	Song Mi-so	
2018	My Healing Love	Choi Yi-soo	
2018	Tale of Fairy	Prof. Jung's student	
2020	Mr. Queen	Hang Sim-hyang	
2021	A Good Supper	Da-jung	
2022	Fanletter, Please!	Koo Hye-ri	
2023	Apple of My Eye	Lee Ye-joo	
2024	Face Me	Park Chae-gyeong	

=== Web series ===
Year	Title	Role	Notes	Ref.
2018	Love After School 2	Kim Jane		
2018	Dokgo Rewind	Shin Soo-jung		
2021	The Witch's Diner	Ga-young	Cameo	
2022	Stock Struck	Shim Soo-jin		
