= Roman Holiday (2017 film) =

- Theatrical poster
- Hangul: 로마의 휴일
- RR: Romaui hyuil
- MR: Romaŭi hyuil
- Directed by: Lee Duk-hee
- Written by: Kim Dong-wook; Cho Chang-yeol
- Produced by: Na Hyun-jun; Lee Jin-sung; Park Gi-tae
- Starring: Im Chang-jung; Gong Hyung-jin; Jung Sang-hoon
- Production company: The Pictures With A View
- Distributed by: Megabox Plus M
- Release date: August 30, 2017 (South Korea)
- Country: South Korea
- Language: Korean

Roman Holiday (Korean: 로마의 휴일) is a 2017 South Korean comedy-drama film directed by Lee Duk-hee.

== Cast ==
- Im Chang-jung as In-han
- Gong Hyung-jin as Gi-joo
- Jung Sang-hoon as Doo-man
- Kang Shin-il as Chief Ahn
- Kang Da-hyun as High school student
- Ha Do-kwon as Detective Lee
- Han So-young
- Yuk Jin-soo
- Bang Jun-ho as Tae-jeon
- Park Woo-joon as Commando 4
- Ko Dong-wook as Jeon-bong
