= Dokgo Rewind =

South Korean series

- Genre: Action; School Life
- Based on: Dokgo Rewind by; Meen (author); Baek Seung-hoon (illustrator)
- Directed by: Choi Eun-jong
- Starring: Oh Se-hun; Jo Byeong-kyu; Ahn Bo-hyun; Kang Mi-na
- Opening theme: "1vs30" by Shin Jung-woo
- Ending theme: "New Dream" by Taeil, Jaehyun (NCT U)
- Country of origin: South Korea
- Original language: Korean
- No. of episodes: 20

Production
- Running time: 10 minutes
- Production company: Samhwa Networks

Original release
- Network: Kakao Page; oksusu; Viki (international)
- Release: September 7, 2018

Dokgo Rewind (Korean: 독고 리와인드) is a 2018 South Korean action web-series based on popular webtoon of the same name by Meen and Baek Seung-hoon. The series serves as a prequel to the webtoon. It stars Oh Se-hun, Jo Byeong-kyu, Ahn Bo-hyun, and Kang Mi-na. The web-series deals with bullying, violence and corruption within the high schools among the delinquent circle and how three boys from different lives come together to fight school violence. A production of Samhwa Networks, it was released online via Kakao Page and oksusu on September 7, 2018, and is also available on Viki.

== Plot ==
Kang Hyuk, a middle-school student took down 30 high-school students single-handedly and got the name 'Dokgo'. 2 years later, he is a dropout and hangs out with his two friends: Choi Jae-Wook (Shin Won-ho) and Goo Bon-hwan (Lee Bum-kyu) who are also dropouts. One day, Hyuk and his friends save Kim Kyu-soon who was getting bullied at the alley, Kyu-soon befriends them asks them to help him protect his sister, Kim Hyun-sun. He tells about the Ki Cheon High and Dang Young High school alliances, a group of delinquents who bullies students and takes money from them to support their circles. Cho Kang-hoon is the leader of Ki Cheon High and Kim Sung-kyu is the leader of Dang Young High.

Kim Jong-il, a Ki Cheon High student who does not want to be the part of the circle hence he wants to leave and live his life normally. He was sent with other students to bring Kim Kyu-soon on orders from Kim Young-ha, second-in-command of Ki Cheon High. He showed impressive fighting skills with a pen and after that, he left the circle and promised Kang-hoon never to fight.

Pyo Tae-jin, a wrestler from Dang Young High's wrestling team, meets Hyuk and his friends in the same alley and befriends them. He has impressive wrestling skills and prepares for the upcoming tournament. A girl named Cho Ho-rim likes him and after confessing him they started dating each other. After getting discharged from the hospital, Kyu-soon, and Hyun-sun were taken to Sung-kyu where Sung-kyu beats him mercilessly. While Jong-il fights with the Dang Young High students by breaking the promise whereas Hyuk and his friends come to save Kyu-soon and Hyun-sun.

Later that night, Kyu-soon dies because of his injuries. Jong-il got suspended from school and befriends Hyuk and Tae-jin. After knowing that the school does not want to take any action on Kyu-soon's death, Hyuk and Jong-il vow to take down both Dang Young and Ki Cheon High. They meet Lee Dong-jae who provides them information regarding both the schools. Hyuk and Jong-il decide to take on the students one by one.

Sung-kyu decides to dissolve the wrestling team as he wants to take revenge on Pyo Tae-jin. After the tournament, he lures Ho-rim and assaults her, Pyo Tae-jin beats him mercilessly where Hyuk interrupts him. Hyun-sun says Sung-kyu to ask her and Kyu-soon forgiveness for all the wrongdoings hence putting an end to Dang Young High circle and the alliance as well. Whereas Jong-il loses to Myung Jin-hwan in a fight.

Two weeks later, Pyo Tae-jin got suspended from Dang Young High, Hyun-sun went to States to live with her parents. Hyuk and Jong-il fight with each other as a part of practice following Jong-il losing to Jin-hwan whereas Tae-jin gets beaten up by Kang-hoon. Then Tae-jin shows up and asks Hyuk and Jong-il if he could join them and take down Ki Cheon High. Hyuk took down Kang-hoon revealing he is 'Dokgo', which means "A poisonous drum. Anyone who hears its sound dies". While Jong-il took on Jin-hwan hence ending the delinquent circle of Ki Cheon High. The same night Hyuk got a phone call, where he gets to know his older twin brother, Kang Hu was beaten to an inch of his life. Months later Hu dies and Hyuk vows to take revenge for Hu's death.

== Cast ==
=== Main ===
- Oh Se-hun as Kang Hyuk/Dokgo, and Kang Hu, Hyuk's older twin brother. Dokgo is the code name given to the notorious Kang Hyuk, a loner who hangs out with Jae-wook and Bon-hwan. He has learned to adapt to the harsh environment of society.
- Jo Byeong-kyu as Kim Jong-il. A bullied high schooler who utilizes pens as a stun weapon
- Ahn Bo-hyun as Pyo Tae-jin. A wrestler. He leads a hard life due to Cho-Horim, but later develops a relationship with her.
- Kang Mina as Kim Hyun-sun, Kim Kyu-soon's sister. She is kind but is quiet and frequently bullied. However, she feels comfort when being around Kang-hyuk. She moves back to the States following Kyu-soon's death.

=== Recurring ===
- Shin Won-ho as Choi Jae-wook, Hyuk's friend.
- Lee Bum-kyu as Koo Bon-hwan, Hyuk's friend.
- Kim Chae-eun as Cho Ho-rim, a senior at the high school who has a crush on Tae-jin
- Nam Tae-boo as Lee Dong-jae
- Kim Hee-jin as Cho Kang-hoon, leader of Ki Cheon High.
- Cha Ji-hyuk as Myung Jin-hwan
- Kang Bong-sung as Kim Young-ha, second-in-command
- Kang Seong-hwa as Noh Jung-rae, friend of Jong-il.
- Lee Joon-woo as Kim Dae-ki.
- Lee Je-yeon as Kim Sung-kyu, leader of Dang Young High.
- Kang Da-hyun as Shin Soo-jung
- Ha Kyung as Joo Sung-ik
- Park Sung-joon as Lee Ki-joo
- Han Seo-jun as Jun Bu-sup

== Original soundtrack ==
Dokgo Rewind (Original Television Soundtrack)

Soundtrack album by Various artists
- Released: September 7, 2018
- Genre: K-Pop, Dance, Rap/Hip hop, Funk/Blues, Soundtrack
- Language: Korean, English
- Label: Music&New

Titles and credits taken from iTunes and MelOn.

No.	Title	Lyrics	Music	Artist	Length
1.	"New Dream"	Chansline	Chansline, Choi Seung-min	Taeil, Jaehyun (NCT U)	3:14
2.	"Dirty World"	Jowonu	ZigZag Note, Del.Mo	Jowonu	3:41
3.	"Monster (Who Am I)"	MAKTUB, 이라온, XenomiX	MAKTUB, 이라온	MAKTUB featuring 이라온, XenomiX	3:18
4.	"Open the eyes of your heart"	Jamie Stonez, Choi Eu-jong	Yi So-yeon, Shin Jung-woo	Jamie Stonez, Jeong Hye-bin	3:58
5.	"1vs30"		Shin Jung-woo		2:24
6.	"A Solitary Fight"		Shin Jung-woo		2:41
7.	"ECLIPSE"		Shin Jung-woo		2:34
8.	"Giddiness"		Han Do-hwan		1:41
9.	"Amazing Match"		Lee Do-hyung		3:33
10.	"Racking"		Han Do-hwan		1:47
11.	"Battle Time"		Lee Do-hyung		2:55
12.	"Jongil's THEME"		Shin Jung-woo		2:46
13.	"Bus Stop"		Yi So-yeon		1:52
14.	"Friendship"		Lee Do-hyung		2:41
15.	"Waiting for TaeJin"		Yi So-yeon		1:58
16.	"Let me introduce my friends"		Yi So-yeon		1:27
17.	"Dream of Happiness"		Shin Jung-woo		2:26
18.	"I don't date older women, but…"		Yi So-yeon		2:25
19.	"Get into Trouble"		Han Do-hwan		1:46
20.	"Just My Job"		Lee Do-hyung		2:03
21.	"Swoop Down"		Lee Do-hyung		4:18
22.	"Combat Readiness"		Han Do-hwan		1:37
23.	"Twisted Step"		Lee Do-hyung		2:16
24.	"Inflame"		Han Do-hwan		1:36
25.	"DOKGO"		Shin Jung-woo		10:02
26.	"The Last Fight"		Shin Jung-woo		5:21

== Reception ==
The website Soompi praised the series for being a drama that "delivers much excitement and adrenaline with cool fight scenes". The same website reported that the series had reached 4 millions views as of October 2018.
