= Korean National Police University =

Police academy in South Korea

- 경찰대학
- Motto: 조국, 정의, 명예 祖國,正義,名譽
- Motto in English: Patriotism, Justice, and Honor
- Type: National
- Established: 1979
- President: Lee Eun Jeong
- Students: 480
- Location: Asan, Chungcheongnam-do, South Korea; 36.749029°N 126.956592°E
- Mascots: Magpie, Zelkova tree
- Website: www.police.ac.kr

Korean name
- Hangul: 경찰대학
- Hanja: 警察大學
- RR: Gyeongchal daehak
- MR: Kyŏngch'al taehak

Korean National Police University (KNPU; Korean: 경찰대학) is a national university in Asan, South Korea, founded in 1979. It is a member of Interpol.

== History ==
- December 28, 1979: official announcement of the Korean National Police University establishment law.
- October 28, 1981: groundbreaking ceremony for the Korean National Police University building. October 28 is celebrated as the anniversary of the founding.
- January 22, 1983: moved to its present campus in Yongin-City, Gyeonggi-Province.
- January 21, 1984: established Training Institute of Executive Officers for Criminal Investigation.
- August 2, 1984: completion of campus construction.
- April 9, 1985: first commencement ceremony.
- October 27, 1986: established Training Institute of Executive Officers for Anti-Communism.
- October 20, 1988: established Research Institute of Public Security Affairs.
- March 1, 1989: admission of five female students in its ninth year.
- February, 12, 2020: joined Interpol.

== Campus ==
=== Symbols ===
The logo of the academy was created on November 23, 2005, which was the 60th anniversary of the police foundation. The eagle is the Korean eagle "cham suri", symbolic of the police stretching its wings over the "mugunghwa" (nation and its citizens) while flying up towards the sky.

- A laurel tree, which represents the campus, was inserted to indicate a sanctuary of education, with the date of its foundation "1979".
- The symbolic gate was built on September 29, 2005, to celebrate the 25th anniversary of its founding, it was created in the traditional style of architecture.
- The main gate was completed on September 2, 1983. The pillars symbolize the care of the people. The octagonal shape of the pillars represent responsibility to protect all directions of our nation, the beam between the pillars represent the democratic police forces as the nation's main beam, the keyhole is the school opening the door of truth, and the two wings represent strong patriotism and honor to guard the nation against insecurity and fear.
- Symbol tower: The tower was designed by professor Kookkyung Cho at Seoul National University, School of Art, and unveiled on April 8, 1985. The rising shape represents the Police University's symbol of the eagle, meaning patriotism, justice, and honor. The body in the center represents the patriotism, the two wings of justice and honor, and the formation changes with distance. The tower measures 1,984 cm to represent the year it was completed, and the central separation line aligns with the summit of the Buphwa Mountain in the background.
- The Justice Tower was created to commemorate the first graduates in 1985.
- The police memorial tower was built on August 14, 2001, to honor 12 fallen police officers. The tower was designed by architect Han Chan-Jo. It is symbolically three meters in width, three meters in length, and four meters in height, and includes the names of the fallen police officers.
- The statue of the late Gyu-Sik Choi, Inspector General, was founded on January 21, 1983, on the hill near the student's Living Hall.
- School bird: magpie
- School tree: Zelkova

== Academics ==
=== Freshman orientation (Cheongram Training) ===
Before enrolling in the school, the National Police University provides freshmen with a two-week orientation program to help them understand the organization of the university and the police. Freshmen are given insights on the police and the police university by participating in introductory programs such as the university curriculum, campus life, and lectures titled 'History of the Police and the Police University' and 'Future-oriented Ways as a Police Officer.'

Badges are attached to the uniforms of the freshmen students, which means the end of the orientation week.

Cheongram Training has been drastically changed as part of the reform of KNPU. It was composed to eliminate the remnants of the military culture and develop one's skills as a democratic citizen. The period was also reduced from two weeks to one week. These changes represent the recent direction of KNPU reform.

=== Curriculum - Regular Semesters ===
==== Major subjects ====
Four majors of police law, criminal investigation, police administration, and 30 credits need to be taken for each course. Major courses may be taken from the junior years, and deals with police law, police administration, and police science related to practice.

==== Major base subjects ====
The major base subjects is a previous phase designed for the study of majored subjects, which have academic curricula to lay a basis for law, public administration, and police science. Students attend the class from their 1st graded to 4th graded 1st semester. A total of 85 academic credits should be completed. The department of law regulates the completion of law (43 credits) and public administration (12 credits) and the department of public administration regulates 35-credit law and 20-credit public administration. The two departments regulate the completion of the police science (30 credits).

==== Liberal arts ====
The subjects for liberal arts regulates the completion of 25 academic credits by the whole students (15 mandatory and 10 optional). The subjects consist of general liberal arts subjects necessary for university graduates to learn, and foreign language classes.

Foreign language classes are classified into English and the second foreign language.

=== Summer/winter semesters ===
Summer/winter semesters are offered in spring, summer and winter semesters. In summer for four weeks before summer vacation, English, computer, swimming, shooting, driving and police station field training are offered. In winter, the same training is offered as for summer except for swimming and driving. As for the 4th grade students, the enlistment training is conducted in cooperation with the Ministry of Defence at the winter semester for male students; and during the same period, female students take executive works at the Police Office or provide social service activities.

==== Foreign Language Education ====
Foreign language education is composed of learning English and a second foreign language, and is concentrated in the summer and winter seasonal semester of 1st year, total class time of which is 90 hours in 3 weeks. Subjects covered are TOEIC, TEPS and 2nd foreign language special lectures. This supplements regular semester curriculum which focuses on comprehension and grammar.

==== Police Field Duty training ====
Practical training at police stations covers Anti-crime (I), Investigation (II), Detective (III) and Traffic (IV) areas. This training starts from the winter semester of the 2nd year, and during this training period, students acquire field experiences. The training also helps the students acquire the experience needed for the entry level administrative staff. Besides this training for which two credits are given, there are field trip programs to crime-related institutions such as the headquarters of police and courts and correctional institutes.

==== Practical subjects ====
Practical subjects are non-credit subjects and computer, swimming, driving and shooting are in this category.

== Dress code ==
=== Uniforms ===
- Winter formal uniforms

The grades of students are distinguished by shoulder straps. Students wear a formal hat and can wear black leather gloves.

- Spring and fall formal uniforms

The grades of students are distinguished by shoulder straps. There difference between spring and fall uniforms and winter uniforms is only in the thickness.

- Summer formal uniforms

Summer uniforms consist of an ivory shirt and black pants. The grades of students are distinguished by shoulder straps. Students wear a formal hat. The shoulder straps of summer uniforms are different from those of winter formal uniforms and spring and fall formal uniforms. .

- Ceremony suit

Students wear the ceremony suit for graduate ceremony or entrance ceremony. It consists of white pants, deep ultramarine jacket and white shoes. In case of girls, there is a white skirt and a pair of white long boots. As a general rule students should wear white gloves and a ceremony hat. The grades of students are distinguished by shoulder straps. This uniform will be abolished from 2020 as part of the KNPU reform.

- Executive suit

The executive suit is the uniform worn for lectures, consisting of a long sleeved shirt, black pants and black shoes. The grades of students are distinguished by shoulder straps.

- Training wear

At training time students put on winter wear. The uniform has a training cap and military shoes. In summer students roll up the shirt sleeves and remove chest blocking fabric.

== Scholarship and welfare system ==
=== Perks and courses after graduation ===
==== Perks ====
- Appointment as an inspector after graduation
- Total exemption of school expenses and supplement of national expenditure for uniforms and teaching materials
- Supplement of a monthly graded allowance
- Providing an opportunity of overseas training to banner students

==== Courses after graduation ====
First, the graduates carry out rotation work for two years: for six months in police station, for one year in investigation department, for a six months in a police box.

They must be in the police for six years after graduation from KNPU otherwise, they must pay for school expenses.

Promotion is by exam or inspection promotion. The exam and inspection promotion are coexistent to a superintendent promotion, but the inspection only is done from a police superintendent.

=== Entering a postgraduate school ===
Students who wish to enter a postgraduate school can be supported by a scholarship from the university.

It is a scholarship association of KNPU and Samsung electronic company that support a scholarship to students entering a postgraduate school. The scholarship association with Samsung has supported a registration fee and an entrance fee to ten students since 2000.

After graduating from postgraduate school, students will have to go through the same procedure as the students that don't enter a postgraduate school.

Some graduates study their field of interest by entering a postgraduate school while serving in the police.

=== Students' studying abroad ===
Every year, some students among the junior class study abroad. In 1984, students visited the police organizations of West Germany, France, Spain to compare police system between countries. From 1986 to 1991, students studied Japan's police organization, and on People's Public Security University in China. About 22 people including students and a professor attend a workshop abroad and conduct research about the police system of that country.

=== Academic exchanges ===
==== Exchanges with domestic universities ====
The Korea National Police University has promoted academic exchanges with other universities in Korea to promote research. KNPU had an academic exchange with Seoul university in 2004 that included a mutual exchange with professors and students, a mutual authorization of grade, an interchange of scientific information and materials, an association meeting. Similarly an academic exchange was made with Hankuk University in 2006

==== International academic exchange ====
The KNPU have focused on a short training abroad for the third grade students until 2004. As a result, the students studied abroad at the police institutions of West Germany, France, Spain in 1984 and of Japan from 1986 to 1991, of America from 1992 to 1997, Chinese People's Armed Police Force Academy from 1998. Furthermore, about 20 students have studied in Japan, America, and Australia.

KNPU has signed an agreement with several universities abroad for an undergraduate exchange programme. The first Korean exchange students started studying in Turkey in 2010.

== See also ==
- List of national universities in South Korea
- List of universities and colleges in South Korea
- Education in Korea
